= 2014 Minnesota United FC season =

Minnesota United FC
2014 season
- Owner: Bill McGuire
- Head Coach: Manny Lagos
- NASL: Spring: First; Fall: Second; Overall: First; Soccer Bowl: Semi-finals
- U.S. Open Cup: Fourth Round
- Top goalscorer: Christian Ramirez
- Highest home attendance: League: 7,287 (July 17 v. Carolina); All: 9,064 (July 19 v. Swansea City)
- Lowest home attendance: 4,913 (May 3 v. Indy)
- Average home league attendance: 6,133
Home colors	Away colors

The 2014 season was Minnesota United FC's fifth season of existence and their fourth consecutive season playing in the North American Soccer League, the second division of the American soccer pyramid.

== Roster ==
As of match played November 8, 2014

No.	Name	Nationality	Position	Date of birth (age)	Signed from	Signed in	Contract ends	Apps.	Goals
Goalkeepers
1	Mitch Hildebrandt	(United States)	GK	12 November 1988 (aged 25)	Oakland Golden Grizzlies	2012		16	0
24	Andrew Fontein	(United States)	GK	3 March 1990 (aged 24)	Tampa Bay Rowdies	2014		0	0
30	Matt Van Oekel	(United States)	GK	20 September 1986 (aged 28)	Minnesota Thunder	2010		80	0
Defenders
2	Justin Davis	(United States)	DF	6 May 1988 (aged 26)	New Mexico Lobos	2011			
3	Cristiano	(Brazil)	DF	25 May 1986 (aged 28)	Miami	2011			
5	Tiago	(Brazil)	DF	19 May 1981 (aged 33)	(Australia) Sydney	2014		26	0
14	Brian Kallman	(United States)	DF	23 April 1984 (aged 30)	Minnesota Thunder	2010			
16	Tyler Polak	(United States)	DF	13 May 1992 (aged 22)	New England Revolution	2014		3	0
27	Brent Kallman	(United States)	DF	4 October 1990 (aged 24)	Des Moines Menace	2013		6	0
Midfielders
0	Floyd Franks	(United States)	MF	5 April 1984 (aged 30)	Carolina RailHawks	2013			
4	Aaron Pitchkolan	(United States)	MF	14 March 1983 (aged 31)	San Antonio Scorpions	2013			
6	Mozzi Gyorio	(United States)	MF	1 August 1989 (aged 25)	(England) Fleetwood Town	2014		1	0
8	Michael Reed	(United States)	MF	28 October 1987 (aged 27)	PSC Soccer Academy	2012			
10	Miguel Ibarra	(United States)	MF	15 March 1990 (aged 24)	UC Irvine Anteaters	2010		86	15
12	Jamie Watson	(United States)	MF	10 April 1986 (aged 28)	Orlando City	2014		27	2
13	Kentaro Takada	(Japan)	MF	13 April 1983 (aged 31)	Rochester Thunder	2010			
17	Omar Daley	(Jamaica)	MF	25 April 1981 (aged 33)	(Scotland) Motherwell	2013		26	3
22	Kevin Venegas	(United States)	MF	29 July 1989 (aged 25)	Fullerton Titans	2010			
23	Greg Jordan	(United States)	MF	5 April 1990 (aged 24)	Philadelphia Union	2014		25	1
77	Juliano Vicentini	(Brazil)	MF	26 August 1981 (aged 33)	(Brazil) Audax	2014		26	1
Forwards
7	Simone Bracalello	(Italy)	FW	21 October 1985 (aged 29)		2010			
9	Pablo Campos	(Brazil)	FW	29 January 1983 (aged 31)	San Antonio Scorpions	2013		26	13
11	Pedro Ferreira-Mendes	(Brazil)	FW	13 May 1990 (aged 24)	Indy Eleven	2014		1	0
11	Daniel Mendes	(Brazil)	FW	18 January 1981 (aged 33)	Loan from (Sweden) Kalmar	2014		26	9
19	Rafael Burgos	(El Salvador)	FW	3 June 1988 (aged 26)	Loan from (Austria) SV Ried	2014		8	0
20	Mackenzie Pridham	(Canada)	FW	13 August 1990 (aged 24)	Cal Poly Mustangs	2014		2	0
21	Christian Ramirez	(United States)	FW	4 April 1991 (aged 23)	Charlotte Eagles	2014		30	21
Players who left during the season
11	Richard Garcia	(Australia)	MF	4 September 1981 (aged 33)	(Australia) Sydney	2014		2	0

=== Staff ===
- (United States) Nick Rogers – President
- (United States) Manny Lagos – Technical Director and Head Coach
- (England) Carl Craig – Assistant Coach
- (England) Paul O'Connor – Goalkeeping Coach
- (United States) Donny Mark – Reserve Team Coach
- (Scotland) Craig Mallace – Director of Camps & Youth Development
- (United States) Dr. Corey Wulf – Team Doctor
- (United States) Dr. Brad Moser – Team Doctor
- (United States) Yoshiyuki Ono – Team Trainer

== Transfers ==
Note: Flags indicate national team as has been defined under FIFA eligibility rules. Players may hold more than one non-FIFA nationality.

In:

Out:

No.	Pos.	Nation	Player
6	MF	CAN	Mozzi Gyorio (from (England) Fleetwood Town)
11	FW	USA	Christian Ramirez (from (United States) Charlotte Eagles)
5	DF	BRA	Tiago Calvano (from (Australia) Sydney FC)
77	MF	BRA	Juliano Vicentini (from (Brazil) Audax São Paulo Esporte Clube)
12	FW	USA	Jamie Watson (from (United States) Orlando City SC)
23	MF	USA	Greg Jordan (from (United States) Philadelphia Union)
16	DF	USA	Tyler Polak (from (United States) New England Revolution)
18	DF	BRA	Daniel Mendes (loan from (Sweden) Kalmar FF)
11	MF	AUS	Richard Garcia (from (Australia) Sydney FC)
20	FW	CAN	Mackenzie Pridham (new signing, trialist)
24	GK	USA	Andrew Fontein ( (United States) Tampa Bay Rowdies)

No.	Pos.	Nation	Player
6	DF	USA	Kevin Friedland (Retired)
10	MF	USA	Mike Ambersley (to (United States) Indy Eleven)
5	DF	BIH	Edi Buro (Released)
15	MF	TTO	Sean de Silva (to (Trinidad and Tobago) Central FC)
11	FW	USA	Maxwell Griffin (Released)
19	DF	BRA	Luis Heitor-Piffer (Released)
32	MF	ARG	Lucas Rodríguez (Released)
33	GK	USA	Daryl Sattler (Released)
20	DF	USA	Connor Tobin (to (United States) Carolina RailHawks)
21	FW	USA	Travis Wall (Released)
28	MF	BIH	Siniša Ubiparipović (back to (Canada) Montreal Impact)
16	MF	SCO	Calum Mallace (back to (Canada) Montreal Impact)
91	MF	BRA	Geison Moura (to (Singapore) Hougang United)

== Friendlies ==
February 25, 2014 Preseason 1	Cal State Fullerton (United States)	1–1	(United States) Minnesota United	Fullerton, California
10:00 PST	Stevens 83'	Report	Campos 4' (pen.)	Stadium: Titan Stadium

February 26, 2014 Preseason 2	Los Angeles Galaxy Reserves (United States)	2–1	(United States) Minnesota United	Carson, California
11:00 PST	McBean 15'; Courtois 52'	Report	Ibarra 59'	Stadium: StubHub Center

March 1, 2014 Preseason 3	Los Angeles Galaxy (United States)	3–1	(United States) Minnesota United	Carson, California
19:00 PST		Report		Stadium: StubHub Center

March 10, 2014 Preseason 4	Matlock Town F.C. (England)	0–3	(United States) Minnesota United	Matlock, Derbyshire, England
19:45 GMT		Report	Ramirez 42'; Dias 67'; Polak 83'	Stadium: Autoworld Arena

March 13, 2014 Preseason 5	Pro Player Academy (England)	0–8	(United States) Minnesota United	Stone, Staffordshire, England
13:00 GMT		Report	Tiago 9'; Campos 25'; Pitchkolan 54'; Bracalello 72'; Franks 73'; Polak; Pittman	Stadium: Wellbeing Park

March 17, 2014 Preseason 6	Derby County F.C. (England)	2–0	(United States) Minnesota United	Derby, Derbyshire, England
	Bamford 80'; Thomas 90'			Stadium: Pride Park Stadium

March 23, 2014 Preseason 7	Minnesota United (United States)	2–2	(United States) Creighton Bluejays	Faribault, Minnesota, USA
				Stadium: Shattuck-Saint Mary's

April 5, 2014 Preseason 8	Minnesota United (United States)	6–0	(United States) Omaha Mavericks	Faribault, Minnesota, USA
	Watson (?); Ramirez (?); Pridham (?); Ibarra (?); Polak (?)	Report		Stadium: Shattuck-Saint Mary's

July 4, 2014 Midseason 1	Minnesota United (United States)	1–1 (4–3 p)	Mexico U-21	Blaine, Minnesota, USA
19:30 CDT	Ramirez 1'; Tiago (yellow card) 36'; Franks (red card) 75'; Vicentini (red card) 75'	Report	Solorio (yellow card) 31'; Espericueta 34'; Sifuentes (red card) 75'	Stadium: National Sports Center; Attendance: 8,059

July 19, 2014 Midseason 2	Minnesota United (United States)	2–0	(Wales) Swansea City	Blaine, Minnesota, USA
19:00 CDT	Davis 7'; Jordan 44'	Report	Richards (yellow card) 43'; Flores (yellow card) 55'; Bartley (yellow card) 72'	Stadium: National Sports Center; Attendance: 9,064

== Competitions ==
=== NASL Spring Championship ===
Pos	Team	Pld	W	D	L	GF	GA	GD	Pts	Qualification
1	Minnesota United (S)	9	6	2	1	16	9	+7	20	Playoffs
2	New York Cosmos	9	6	1	2	14	3	+11	19	
3	San Antonio Scorpions	9	5	2	2	13	9	+4	17	
4	Carolina RailHawks	9	4	2	3	11	15	−4	14	
5	Fort Lauderdale Strikers	9	4	1	4	18	18	0	13	
6	Ottawa Fury	9	3	1	5	14	13	+1	10	
7	Tampa Bay Rowdies	9	2	4	3	11	16	−5	10	
8	Atlanta Silverbacks	9	3	1	5	12	20	−8	10	
9	FC Edmonton	9	2	2	5	11	11	0	8	
10	Indy Eleven	9	0	4	5	14	20	−6	4	

Source: NASL Standings
(S) Spring season champion

==== Results summary ====
Overall								Home						Away					
Pld	W	D	L	GF	GA	GD	Pts	W	D	L	GF	GA	GD	W	D	L	GF	GA	GD
9	6	2	1	16	9	+7	20	3	1	0	7	3	+4	3	1	1	9	6	+3

Last updated: June 8, 2014.
Source: Match reports

==== Results by round ====
Round	1	2	3	4	5	6	7	8	9
Ground	A	A	H	H	A	H	H	A	A
Result	W	W	W	W	L	W	D	W	D
Position	2	2	1	1	2	1	1	1	1

Updated to match(es) played on June 8, 2014. Source: Match reports
A = Away; H = Home; W = Win; D = Draw; L = Loss

==== Matches ====
Win Loss Draw

April 12, 2014 Matchday 1	San Antonio Scorpions	0–2	Minnesota United	San Antonio, Texas, USA
19:30 CDT	Cann (yellow card) 13'; James (red card) 25'; Barrera (yellow card) 32'; Touray (yellow card) 63'; Menjivar (yellow card) 74'	Report	Ramirez 17'; Tiago (yellow card) 25'; Dias (yellow card) 26'; Venegas 73'; Watson (yellow card) 90'	Stadium: Toyota Field; Attendance: 7,381; Referee: Matthew Foerster

April 19, 2014 Matchday 2	Ottawa Fury FC	1–2	Minnesota United	Ottawa, Ontario, Canada
15:00 EDT	Dantas 50'; Davies (yellow card) 83'; Elias (yellow card) 90'	Report	Pitchkolan (yellow card) 21'; Ibarra 36'; Dias (yellow card) 72'; Ramirez 90'	Stadium: Keith Harris Stadium; Attendance: 3,457; Referee: D. Barrie

April 26, 2014 Matchday 3	Minnesota United	1–0	FC Edmonton	Blaine, Minnesota, USA
19:00 CDT	Tiago (yellow card) 4'; Bracalello 70' (pen.)	Report	Nonni (yellow card) 18'; Moses (yellow card) 20'; Aleksic (yellow card) 88'	Stadium: National Sports Center; Attendance: 5,287; Referee: Younes Marrakchi

May 3, 2014 Matchday 4	Minnesota United	3–2	Indy Eleven	Blaine, Minnesota, USA
19:00 CDT	Ramirez 23'; Mendes 25', (yellow card) 37'; Dias (yellow card) 44'; Pitchkolan 45'	Report	Ring (yellow card) 31'; Bracalello 42' (o.g.); Frías (yellow card) 48'; Ferreira-Mendes (yellow card) 85'; Kléberson 90' (pen.)	Stadium: National Sports Center; Attendance: 4,913; Referee: Daniel Radford

May 12, 2014 Matchday 5	New York Cosmos	1–0	Minnesota United	Hempstead, New York, USA
19:30 EDT	Senna (yellow card) 42', (goal) 61'; Diosa (yellow card) 71'	Report	Vicentini (yellow card) 22'; Tiago (yellow card) 39'; Davis (yellow card) 63'	Stadium: Shuart Stadium; Attendance: 3,091; Referee: Robert Sibiga

May 19, 2014 Matchday 6	Minnesota United	3–1	Fort Lauderdale Strikers	Blaine, Minnesota, USA
19:00 CDT	Bracalello 12' (pen.); Ramirez 58'; Kallman (yellow card) 65'; Ibarra 70'; Mendes (yellow card) 90'; Davis (yellow card) 90'	Report	Núñez 50', (yellow card) 71'; Salazar (yellow card) 71'; King (yellow card) 75'	Stadium: National Sports Center; Attendance: 5,325; Referee: Fotis Bazakos

May 24, 2014 Matchday 7	Minnesota United	0–0	Carolina RailHawks	Blaine, Minnesota, USA
19:00 CDT	Jordan (yellow card) 39'; Vicentini (yellow card) 78'; Dias (red card) 86'; Daley (red card) 90'; Ibarra (yellow card) 90'	Report	Schilawski (yellow card) 26'	Stadium: National Sports Center; Attendance: 6,784; Referee: Sorin Stoica

May 31, 2014 Matchday 8	Atlanta Silverbacks	1–2	Minnesota United	Atlanta, Georgia, USA
19:45 EDT	Chavez (yellow card) 54'; Poku 85'	Report	Davis (yellow card) 36'; Jordan 52'; Ramirez 74'	Stadium: Atlanta Silverbacks Park; Attendance: 5,000; Referee: Andres Pfefferkorn

June 7, 2014 Matchday 9	Tampa Bay Rowdies	3–3	Minnesota United	St. Petersburg, Florida, USA
19:30 EDT	Wagner 33'; Wallace (yellow card) 43'; Mkosana 45'; Sanfilippo 74'	Report	Ramirez (yellow card) 9'; Davis 12'; Mendes 57'; Ibarra 61'	Stadium: Al Lang Stadium; Attendance: 4,132; Referee: Allen Chapman

=== NASL Fall Championship ===
Pos	Team	Pld	W	D	L	GF	GA	GD	Pts	Qualification
1	San Antonio Scorpions (F)	18	11	2	5	30	15	+15	35	Playoffs
2	Minnesota United	18	10	5	3	31	19	+12	35	
3	FC Edmonton	18	8	5	5	23	18	+5	29	
4	Fort Lauderdale Strikers	18	7	6	5	20	21	−1	27	
5	Carolina RailHawks	18	7	3	8	27	28	−1	24	
6	New York Cosmos	18	5	8	5	23	24	−1	23	
7	Indy Eleven	18	6	5	7	21	26	−5	23	
8	Tampa Bay Rowdies	18	5	5	8	25	34	−9	20	
9	Ottawa Fury	18	4	5	9	20	25	−5	17	
10	Atlanta Silverbacks	18	3	4	11	20	30	−10	13	

Source: NASL Standings
(F) Fall season champion

==== Results summary ====
Overall								Home						Away					
Pld	W	D	L	GF	GA	GD	Pts	W	D	L	GF	GA	GD	W	D	L	GF	GA	GD
18	10	5	3	31	19	+12	35	6	2	1	15	7	+8	4	3	2	16	12	+4

Last updated: November 2, 2014.
Source: Match reports

==== Results by round ====
Round	1	2	3	4	5	6	7	8	9	10	11	12	13	14	15	16	17	18
Ground	A	H	A	H	H	H	A	A	H	H	A	A	H	A	A	H	H	A
Result	W	W	D	W	W	W	D	L	D	W	W	W	W	L	W	D	L	D
Position	1	1	2	2	2	1	2	2	2	2	1	1	1	1	1	1	1	2

Updated to match(es) played on November 2, 2014. Source: Match reports
A = Away; H = Home; W = Win; D = Draw; L = Loss

==== Matches ====
Win Loss Draw

July 12, 2014 Matchday 1	Fort Lauderdale Strikers	0–3	Minnesota United	Fort Lauderdale, Florida, USA
19:30 EDT	Anderson (yellow card) 36'; Gordon (yellow card) 81'	Report	Mendes 23'; Pitchkolan (yellow card) 36'; Ramirez 59'; Ibarra 78'	Stadium: Lockhart Stadium; Attendance: 3,092; Referee: Andres Pfefferkorn

July 17, 2014 Matchday 2	Minnesota United	1–0	Carolina RailHawks	Blaine, Minnesota, USA
19:00 CDT	Mendes 26'; Davis (red card) 81'; Tiago (yellow card) 85'	Report	Low (red card) 82'	Stadium: National Sports Center; Attendance: 7,287; Referee: Younes Marrakchi

July 26, 2014 Matchday 3	Atlanta Silverbacks	1–1	Minnesota United	Atlanta, Georgia, USA
19:30 EDT	Gavin (yellow card) 55'; Sandoval (yellow card) 74'; Chavez 90' (pen.)	Report	Pitchkolan (yellow card) 39'; Ramirez 47'; Mendes (yellow card) 90'	Stadium: Atlanta Silverbacks Park; Attendance: 4,810; Referee: Chris Penso

August 2, 2014 Matchday 4	Minnesota United	2–1	Ottawa Fury FC	Minneapolis, Minnesota, USA
16:30 CDT	Ramirez 4', 60' (pen.); Daley (yellow card) 29'; Tiago (yellow card) 90'	Report	Eustaquio (yellow card) 46'; Ubiparipović 50'; Beckie (yellow card) 57'	Stadium: TCF Bank Stadium; Attendance: 34,047; Referee: Tyler Ploeger
Note: Game was played directly after the International Champions Cup match between Olympiacos and Manchester City.

August 9, 2014 Matchday 5	Minnesota United	3–2	FC Edmonton	Blaine, Minnesota, USA
19:00 CDT	Ramirez 15' (pen.); Mendes 48', 59'; Tiago (yellow card) 71'; Hildebrandt (red card) 78'	Report	Laing 4'; Moses (yellow card) 45'; Edward (yellow card) 61'; Hlavaty 81' (pen.)	Stadium: National Sports Center; Attendance: 5,112; Referee: Mathieu Bourdeau

August 16, 2014 Matchday 6	Minnesota United	5–1	Indy Eleven	Blaine, Minnesota, USA
19:00 CDT	Pitchkolan 25'; Ramirez 37', 58'; Mendes 45'; Tiago (yellow card) 52'; Watson 53'	Report	Hyland (yellow card) 64'; Kléberson 71'	Stadium: National Sports Center; Attendance: 5,420; Referee: Nima Saghafi

August 23, 2014 Matchday 7	New York Cosmos	1–1	Minnesota United	Hempstead, New York, USA
19:00 EDT	Maurer (red card) 6'; Dimitrov (yellow card) 45'; Ayoze (yellow card) 52'; Stokkelien 74'	Report	Ramirez 8' (pen.); Franks (yellow card) 30'; Mendes (yellow card) 37'; Vicentini (yellow card) 78'	Stadium: Shuart Stadium; Attendance: 3,928; Referee: Mark Allatin

August 31, 2014 Matchday 8	FC Edmonton	2–1	Minnesota United	Edmonton, Alberta, Canada
16:00 EDT	Burt 65'; Laing 71'	Report	Mendes 80'; Venegas (yellow card) 82'	Stadium: Clarke Stadium; Attendance: 2,796; Referee: Alain Ruch

September 6, 2014 Matchday 9	Minnesota United	1–1	Tampa Bay Rowdies	Blaine, Minnesota, USA
19:00 CDT	Ramirez 14' (pen.)	Report	Hristov 70'	Stadium: National Sports Center; Attendance: 7,024; Referee: Marcos DeOliveira

September 13, 2014 Matchday 10	Minnesota United	2–1	Fort Lauderdale Strikers	Blaine, Minnesota, USA
19:00 CDT	Ramirez 38'; Ibarra 54'; Reed (yellow card) 80'	Report	Pecka 31'; Antonijevic (yellow card) 30'; Anderson (yellow card) 40'; Nurse (yellow card) 74'; Guillaume (yellow card) 79'	Stadium: National Sports Center; Attendance: 6,202; Referee: Christopher Penso

September 20, 2014 Matchday 11	San Antonio Scorpions	0–2	Minnesota United	San Antonio, Texas, USA
20:30 EDT	Elizondo (yellow card) 50'; DeRoux (yellow card) 90'	Report	Venegas (yellow card) 21'; Ibarra 22', 72'; Mendes (yellow card) 88'	Stadium: Toyota Field; Attendance: 8,313; Referee: Younes Marrakchi

September 28, 2014 Matchday 12	Ottawa Fury FC	2–3	Minnesota United	Ottawa, Ontario, Canada
15:00 EDT	Heinemann 16' (pen.); Ryan 55'; Trafford (yellow card) 56'	Report	Tiago (yellow card) 16'; Ibarra 20'; Mendes 23'; Ramirez 88'; Daley (yellow card) 90'; Reed (yellow card) 90'	Stadium: TD Place Stadium; Attendance: 5,094; Referee: Chris Grabas

October 4, 2014 Matchday 13	Minnesota United	1–0	Atlanta Silverbacks	Blaine, Minnesota, USA
19:00 CDT	Pitchkolan (yellow card) 43'; Ramirez 58'	Report	Gavin (yellow card) 30'; Espinoza (yellow card) 49' (yellow-red card) 62'; Rivera (yellow card) 90'	Stadium: National Sports Center; Attendance: 5,744; Referee: Fotis Bazakos

October 11, 2014 Matchday 14	Indy Eleven	2–0	Minnesota United	Indianapolis, Indiana, USA
19:30 EDT	Pineda 8'; Rugg (yellow card) 35'; Jhulliam 46'; Frías (yellow card) 54'; Peña (yellow card) 63'	Report	Vicentini (yellow card) 45'; Dias (yellow card) 45'	Stadium: Michael Carroll Stadium; Attendance: 10,285; Referee: Sorin Stoica

October 15, 2014 Matchday 15	Tampa Bay Rowdies	2–3	Minnesota United	St. Petersburg, Florida, USA
19:30 EDT	Hristov 28'; Russell (yellow card) 48'; Townsend 90'	Report	Ramirez 44', 58'; Vicentini 66'	Stadium: Al Lang Stadium; Attendance: 2,565; Referee: Rubiel Vazquez

October 18, 2014 Matchday 16	Minnesota United	0–0	New York Cosmos	Blaine, Minnesota, USA
19:00 CDT	Jordan (yellow card) 36'; Davis (yellow card) 41'; Pitchkolan (yellow card) 65'; Tiago (yellow card) 90'	Report	Szetela (yellow card) 35'; Johnson (yellow card) 48'; Mendes (red card) 85'	Stadium: National Sports Center; Attendance: 5,817; Referee: Younes Marrakchi

October 25, 2014 Matchday 17	Minnesota United	0–1	San Antonio Scorpions	Blaine, Minnesota, USA
19:00 CDT	Tiago (yellow card) 24'; Van Oekel (yellow card) 62'	Report	James (yellow card) 58'; Elizondo 61'; Castillo (yellow card) 88'	Stadium: National Sports Center; Attendance: 6,454; Referee: Juan Guzmán Jr

November 1, 2014 Matchday 18	Carolina RailHawks	2–2	Minnesota United	Cary, North Carolina, USA
19:30 EDT	Novo 22'; Osaki (yellow card) 35'; Scott (yellow card) 61'; Albadawi 74'; Tobin 86' (o.g.), (yellow card) 90'	Report	Ramirez 52'; Dias (yellow card) 64'; Vicentini (yellow card) 83'	Stadium: WakeMed Soccer Park; Attendance: 6,460; Referee: Robert Sibiga

=== NASL Playoffs ===
Pos	Team	Pld	W	D	L	GF	GA	GD	Pts	Qualification
1	Minnesota United (X)	27	16	7	4	47	28	+19	55	Championship qualifiers
2	San Antonio Scorpions (C)	27	16	4	7	43	24	+19	52	Championship qualifiers
3	New York Cosmos	27	11	9	7	37	27	+10	42	Championship qualifiers
4	Fort Lauderdale Strikers	27	11	7	9	38	39	−1	40	Championship qualifiers
5	Carolina RailHawks	27	11	5	11	38	43	−5	38	
6	FC Edmonton	27	10	7	10	34	29	+5	37	
7	Tampa Bay Rowdies	27	7	9	11	36	50	−14	30	
8	Ottawa Fury	27	7	6	14	34	38	−4	27	
9	Indy Eleven	27	6	9	12	35	46	−11	27	
10	Atlanta Silverbacks	27	6	5	16	32	50	−18	23	

(C) Champions; (X) North American Supporters' Trophy winner

==== Semi-finals ====
November 8, 2014	Minnesota United	1–1 (a.e.t.) (4–5 p)	Fort Lauderdale Strikers	Blaine, Minnesota, USA
18:00 CDT	Ibarra 34'; Mendes (yellow card) 50'	Report	Kronsteiner (red card) 71'; Anderson (yellow card) 83'; Nuñez (yellow card) 87', (goal) 90+1'; Marcelin (yellow card) 105'; Brito (yellow card) 118'	Stadium: National Sports Center; Attendance: 6,113; Referee: Fotis Bazakos
	Penalties
	Venegas (penalty missed); Tiago (penalty scored); Ibarra (penalty scored); Vicentini (penalty scored); Campos (penalty scored); Pitchkolan (penalty missed)		(penalty scored) Hassan; (penalty scored) Anderson; (penalty scored) Picault; (penalty scored) Núñez; (penalty missed) Brito; (penalty scored) Pecka

=== US Open Cup ===
May 28, 2014 Third round	Des Moines Menace	0–1	Minnesota United	West Des Moines, Iowa
19:30 CDT		Report; Report 2	Polak (yellow card) 48'; Ramirez 86'	Stadium: Valley Stadium; Attendance: 2,196; Referee: Nima Saghafi

June 18, 2014 Fourth round	Sporting Kansas City	2–0	Minnesota United	Kansas City, Kansas
19:30 CDT	Saad 76'; Dwyer (yellow card) 82'; Martinez 87'	Report; Report 2	Jordan (yellow card) 29'; Dias (red card) 50'	Stadium: Sporting Park; Attendance: 15,307; Referee: Tyler Ploeger

== Squad statistics ==
As of match played November 8, 2014

=== Appearances and goals ===
No.	Pos	Nat	Player	Total		NASL Spring Season		NASL Fall Season		Playoffs		U.S. Open Cup	
No.	Pos	Nat	Player	Apps	Goals	Apps	Goals	Apps	Goals	Apps	Goals	Apps	Goals
0	MF	(United States) USA	Floyd Franks	13	0	2+2	0	7	0	0	0	1+1	0
1	GK	(United States) USA	Mitch Hildebrandt	11	0	2+1	0	6	0	0	0	2	0
2	DF	(United States) USA	Justin Davis	27	0	9	0	16	0	1	0	1	0
3	DF	(Brazil) BRA	Cristiano	28	0	7+1	0	17	0	1	0	2	0
4	MF	(United States) USA	Aaron Pitchkolan	29	2	9	1	17	1	1	0	1+1	0
5	DF	(Brazil) BRA	Tiago	26	0	8	0	16	0	1	0	1	0
6	MF	(Canada) CAN	Mozzi Gyorio	1	0	0	0	0	0	0	0	1	0
7	FW	(Italy) ITA	Simone Bracalello	13	2	5+3	2	0+5	0	0	0	0	0
8	MF	(United States) USA	Michael Reed	10	0	0+1	0	3+5	0	0	0	1	0
9	FW	(Brazil) BRA	Pablo Campos	3	0	0	0	0+2	0	0+1	0	0	0
10	MF	(United States) USA	Miguel Ibarra	28	9	8+1	3	16+1	5	1	1	1	0
12	MF	(United States) USA	Jamie Watson	19	1	4+2	0	5+5	1	0+1	0	1+1	0
13	MF	(Japan) JPN	Kentaro Takada	1	0	0	0	0	0	0	0	1	0
14	DF	(United States) USA	Brian Kallman	10	0	5	0	2+3	0	0	0	0	0
15	FW	(Brazil) BRA	Pedro Ferreira-Mendes	1	0	0	0	0+1	0	0	0	0	0
16	DF	(United States) USA	Tyler Polak	3	0	0+1	0	0+1	0	0	0	1	0
17	MF	(Jamaica) JAM	Omar Daley	20	0	3+2	0	5+7	0	0+1	0	1+1	0
18	FW	(Brazil) BRA	Daniel Mendes	26	9	6+1	2	16+1	7	1	0	1	0
19	FW	(El Salvador) ESA	Rafael Burgos	8	0	0	0	1+7	0	0	0	0	0
20	FW	(Canada) CAN	Mackenzie Pridham	2	0	0+1	0	0	0	0	0	1	0
21	FW	(United States) USA	Christian Ramirez	30	21	9	5	18	15	1	0	1+1	1
22	MF	(United States) USA	Kevin Venegas	23	1	4	1	17	0	1	0	1	0
23	MF	(United States) USA	Greg Jordan	25	1	2+6	1	9+5	0	1	0	1+1	0
27	DF	(United States) USA	Brent Kallman	4	0	1	0	2	0	0	0	1	0
30	GK	(United States) USA	Matt Van Oekel	21	0	7	0	12+1	0	1	0	0	0
77	MF	(Brazil) BRA	Juliano Vicentini	26	1	8	0	13+3	1	1	0	1	0
Players who left Minnesota United during the season:
11	MF	(Australia) AUS	Richard Garcia	2	0	0+2	0	0	0	0	0	0	0

=== Goal scorers ===
Place	Position	Nation	Number	Name	NASL Spring Season	NASL Fall Season	Playoffs	U.S. Open Cup	Total
1	FW	(United States)	21	Christian Ramirez	5	15	0	1	21
2	MF	(United States)	10	Miguel Ibarra	3	5	1	0	9
2	FW	(Brazil)	18	Daniel Mendes	2	7	0	0	9
4	FW	(Italy)	7	Simone Bracalello	2	0	0	0	2
4	MF	(United States)	4	Aaron Pitchkolan	1	1	0	0	2
6	MF	(United States)	22	Kevin Venegas	1	0	0	0	1
6	MF	(United States)	23	Greg Jordan	1	0	0	0	1
6	DF	(United States)	2	Justin Davis	1	0	0	0	1
6	MF	(United States)	12	Jamie Watson	0	1	0	0	1
6	MF	(Brazil)	77	Juliano Vicentini	0	1	0	0	1
6				Own goal	0	1	0	0	1
TOTALS					16	31	1	1	49

=== Disciplinary record ===
Number	Nation	Position	Name	NASL Spring Season		NASL Fall Season		Playoffs		U.S. Open Cup		Total	
Number	Nation	Position	Name	Yellow card	Red card	Yellow card	Red card	Yellow card	Red card	Yellow card	Red card	Yellow card	Red card
0	(United States)	MF	Floyd Franks	0	0	1	0	0	0	0	0	1	0
1	(United States)	GK	Mitch Hildebrandt	0	0	0	1	0	0	0	0	0	1
2	(United States)	DF	Justin Davis	3	0	1	1	0	0	0	0	4	1
3	(Brazil)	DF	Cristiano	3	1	2	0	0	0	0	1	5	2
4	(United States)	MF	Aaron Pitchkolan	1	0	4	0	0	0	0	0	5	0
5	(Brazil)	DF	Tiago	3	0	7	0	0	0	0	0	10	0
8	(United States)	MF	Michael Reed	0	0	2	0	0	0	0	0	2	0
10	(United States)	MF	Miguel Ibarra	1	0	0	0	0	0	0	0	1	0
12	(United States)	MF	Jamie Watson	1	0	0	0	0	0	0	0	1	0
14	(United States)	DF	Brian Kallman	1	0	0	0	0	0	0	0	1	0
16	(United States)	FW	Nate Polak	0	0	0	0	0	0	1	0	1	0
17	(Jamaica)	MF	Omar Daley	0	1	2	0	0	0	0	0	2	1
18	(Brazil)	FW	Daniel Mendes	2	0	3	0	1	0	0	0	6	0
21	(United States)	FW	Christian Ramirez	1	0	0	0	0	0	0	0	1	0
22	(United States)	MF	Kevin Venegas	0	0	2	0	0	0	0	0	2	0
23	(United States)	MF	Greg Jordan	1	0	1	0	0	0	1	0	3	0
30	(United States)	GK	Matt Van Oekel	0	0	1	0	0	0	0	0	1	0
77	(Brazil)	MF	Juliano Vicentini	2	0	3	0	0	0	0	0	5	0
			TOTALS	20	2	40	2	1	0	2	1	63	5

== See also ==
- Minnesota United FC
- 2014 North American Soccer League season
- 2014 in American soccer
