= 2015 Minnesota United FC season =

Minnesota United FC
2015 season
- Owner: Bill McGuire
- Head coach: Manny Lagos
- NASL: Spring: 4th Fall: 2nd Overall: 3rd Soccer Bowl: Semi-Finals
- U.S. Open Cup: Third Round
- Top goalscorer: League: Christian Ramirez (13); All: Christian Ramirez (13)
- Highest home attendance: 9,418 (September 19 vs. New York, Franchise record)
- Lowest home attendance: 5,890 (October 31 vs. San Antonio)
- Average home league attendance: 8,767
Home colors	Away colors

The 2015 season will be Minnesota United FC's sixth season of existence and their fifth consecutive season playing in the North American Soccer League, the second division of the American soccer pyramid.

== Club ==
As of match played November 8, 2015

No.	Name	Nationality	Position	Date of birth (age)	Signed from	Signed in	Contract ends	Apps.	Goals
Goalkeepers
1	Mitch Hildebrandt	(United States)	GK	12 November 1988 (aged 26)	Oakland Golden Grizzlies	2012		24	0
24	Andrew Fontein	(United States)	GK	3 March 1990 (aged 25)	Tampa Bay Rowdies	2014		0	0
33	Sammy Ndjock	(Cameroon)	GK	25 February 1990 (aged 25)	(Turkey) Antalyaspor	2015		24	0
Defenders
2	Justin Davis	(United States)	DF	6 May 1988 (aged 27)	New Mexico Lobos	2011			
3	Cristiano	(Brazil)	DF	25 May 1986 (aged 29)	Miami	2011			
5	Tiago	(Brazil)	DF	19 May 1981 (aged 34)	(Australia) Sydney	2014		55	1
6	Brent Kallman	(United States)	DF	4 October 1990 (aged 25)	Des Moines Menace	2013		15	1
14	Brian Kallman	(United States)	DF	23 April 1984 (aged 31)	Minnesota Thunder	2010			
16	Tyler Polak	(United States)	DF	13 May 1992 (aged 23)	New England Revolution	2014		5	0
Midfielders
4	Aaron Pitchkolan	(United States)	MF	14 March 1983 (aged 32)	San Antonio Scorpions	2013			
7	Kevin Venegas	(United States)	MF	29 July 1989 (aged 26)	Fullerton Titans	2010			
8	Ibson	(Brazil)	MF	7 November 1983 (aged 32)	(Italy) Bologna	2015		27	6
11	Kalif Alhassan	(Ghana)	MF	15 October 1990 (aged 25)	Portland Timbers	2015		28	4
13	Jamie Watson	(United States)	MF	10 April 1986 (aged 29)	Orlando City	2014		31	3
17	Yago	(Brazil)	MF	28 April 1994 (aged 21)	Loan from (Brazil) Vasco da Gama	2015		11	0
19	Alejandro Vela	(Mexico)	MF	28 March 1984 (aged 31)	(Mexico) Cruz Azul	2015		9	0
20	Andrei Gotsmanov	(Belarus)	MF	6 May 1986 (aged 29)		2015		51	3
23	Greg Jordan	(United States)	MF	5 April 1990 (aged 24)	Philadelphia Union	2014		50	1
77	Juliano Vicentini	(Brazil)	MF	26 August 1981 (aged 33)	(Brazil) Audax	2014		49	3
Forwards
9	Pablo Campos	(Brazil)	FW	29 January 1983 (aged 32)	San Antonio Scorpions	2013		56	20
18	Daniel Mendes	(Brazil)	FW	18 January 1981 (aged 34)	(Sweden) Kalmar	2015		53	15
21	Christian Ramirez	(United States)	FW	4 April 1991 (aged 24)	Charlotte Eagles	2014		62	34
29	J. C. Banks	(United States)	FW	24 August 1989 (aged 26)	Rochester Rhinos	2015		20	3
99	Geison Moura	(Brazil)	FW	16 July 1986 (aged 29)	(Singapore) Hougang United	2015			
Players who left during the season
10	Miguel Ibarra	(United States)	MF	15 March 1990 (aged 25)	UC Irvine Anteaters	2010		96	18
22	Jonny Steele	(Northern Ireland)	MF	7 February 1986 (aged 29)	(Australia) Newcastle Jets	2015		6	0

== Transfers ==
=== Transfers in ===
Entry date	Position	No.	Player	From club	Fee	Ref.
December 11, 2014	FW	29	(United States) J. C. Banks	(United States) Rochester Rhinos	Undisclosed	
January 8, 2015	MF	22	(Northern Ireland) Jonny Steele	(Australia) Newcastle Jets FC	Free	
February 22, 2015	FW	11	(Ghana) Kalif Alhassan	(United States) Portland Timbers	Free	
February 23, 2015	MF	8	(Brazil) Ibson	(Italy) Bologna	Free	
March 9, 2015	GK	33	(Cameroon) Sammy N'Djock	(Turkey) Antalyaspor	Free	
April 1, 2015	FW	99	(Brazil) Geison Moura	(Singapore) Hougang United FC	Free	
August 12, 2015	MF	20	(Belarus) Andrei Gotsmanov	Free Agent	Free	
September 11, 2015	MF	19	(Mexico) Alejandro Vela	Free Agent	Free	

=== Transfers out ===
Exit date	Position	No.	Player	To club	Fee	Ref.
December 4, 2014	MF	0	(United States) Floyd Franks	n/a	Released	
December 4, 2014	MF	6	(Canada) Mozzi Gyorio	(United States) Austin Aztex	Released	
December 4, 2014	FW	7	(Italy) Simone Bracalello	(United States) Carolina RailHawks	Released	
December 4, 2014	MF	8	(United States) Michael Reed	(United States) Atlanta Silverbacks	Released	
December 4, 2014	MF	13	(Japan) Kentaro Takada	(United States) Saint Louis FC	Released	
December 4, 2014	FW	15	(Brazil) Pedro Ferreira-Mendes	(United States) Atlanta Silverbacks	Released	
December 4, 2014	FW	17	(Jamaica) Omar Daley	(United States) Oklahoma City Energy	Released	
December 4, 2014	MF	19	(El Salvador) Rafael Burgos	(Austria) SV Ried	End of Loan	
December 4, 2014	FW	20	(Canada) Mackenzie Pridham	(Canada) Whitecaps FC 2	Released	
December 4, 2014	FW	25	(United States) Nate Polak	(United States) Louisville City FC	Released	
December 4, 2014	GK	30	(United States) Matt Van Oekel	(Canada) FC Edmonton	Released	
July 1, 2015	MF	10	(United States) Miguel Ibarra	(Mexico) Club León	Undisclosed (seven figures)	
July 1, 2015	MF	22	(Northern Ireland) Jonny Steele	n/a	Released	

=== Loans in ===
Start date	End date	Position	No.	Player	From club	Ref.
July 14, 2015	End of Season	MF	17	(Brazil) Yago Silva	(Brazil) Vasco	

=== Management ===
- (United States) Nick Rogers – President
- (United States) Manny Lagos – Technical Director and Head Coach
- (England) Carl Craig – Assistant Coach
- (United States) Donny Mark – Assistant Coach
- (England) Paul O'Connor – Goalkeeping Coach
- (United States) Peter Rivard – Reserves Team Coach
- (Scotland) Craig Mallace – Director of Camps & Youth Development
- (United States) Dr. Corey Wulf – Team Doctor
- (United States) Dr. Brad Moser – Team Doctor
- (United States) Yoshiyuki Ono – Team Athletic Trainer
- (United States) David Bloomquist – Team Athletic Trainer

== Friendlies ==
February 19, 2015 Preseason 1	Seattle Sounders FC	1–1	Minnesota United FC	Tucson, Arizona
12:30 CST	Cooper 45'	Report	Ibarra 50'; Pitchkolan (yellow card) 55'; Hildebrandt (yellow card) 55'	Stadium: Kino Veterans Memorial Stadium
Note: 60-minute scrimmage.

February 25, 2015 Preseason 2	Indy Eleven	0–1	Minnesota United FC	Casa Grande, Arizona
12:00 CST			Alhassan 29'	Stadium: Grande Sports World
Note: 70-minute scrimmage.

February 27, 2015 Preseason 3	Sporting Kansas City	1–0	Minnesota United FC	Tucson, Arizona
11:30 CST	Añor 8'		Tiago (yellow card) 23'	Stadium: Kino Veterans Memorial Stadium

March 16, 2015 Preseason 4	Volta Redonda (Brazil)	2–3	(United States) Minnesota United FC	Pinheiral, Brazil
1:30 CST	Pedro 18'; Eduardo 73'		Banks 55'; Watson 67' (pen.); Mendes 80'	Stadium: CT João Havelange

March 18, 2015 Preseason 5	Botafogo (Brazil)	2–0	(United States) Minnesota United FC	Rio de Janeiro, Brazil
3:15 CST	Pimpão 84'; Sassá 86'			Stadium: Estádio Olímpico João Havelange

March 21, 2015 Preseason 6	Barra Mansa (Brazil)	3–3	(United States) Minnesota United FC	Pinheiral, Brazil
CST	15'; 25'; 52'		Campos 14'; Watson 47', 65' (pen.)	Stadium: CT João Havelange

March 23, 2015 Preseason 7	Vasco da Gama (Brazil)	0–1	(United States) Minnesota United FC	Rio de Janeiro, Brazil
CST			Mendes 51'	Stadium: Estádio São Januário

April 3, 2015 Preseason 8	Minnesota United FC	1–1	University of Nebraska Omaha	Woodbury, Minnesota
9:00 CST	Ramirez 65'		E. Alihodzic 3'	Stadium: Bielenberg Sports Complex

April 7, 2015 Preseason 9	Orlando City SC	2–3	Minnesota United FC	Sanford, Florida
12:00 CST	Róchez 12'; Donovan 29'	Report	Ibarra 19'; Watson 68'; Campos 76' (pen.)	Stadium: Lake Sylvan Park

July 18, 2015 Midseason	Minnesota United FC (United States)	1–1	(Mexico) Club León	Blaine, Minnesota
7:00 CDT	Dias (yellow card) 50'; Kallman (yellow card) 57'; Moura (yellow card) 67'; Yago (yellow card) 90'; Campos 83'	Report	Rocha 39'; Burdisso (yellow card) 73'; Montes (yellow card) 90'	Stadium: National Sports Center; Attendance: 9.388
Note: Miguel Ibarra will play one half for each team.

== Competitions ==
=== NASL Spring Championship ===
Pos	Team	Pld	W	D	L	GF	GA	GD	Pts	Qualification
1	New York Cosmos (S)	10	5	5	0	18	9	+9	20	Playoffs
2	Tampa Bay Rowdies	10	5	4	1	15	9	+6	19	
3	Carolina RailHawks	10	3	5	2	15	10	+5	14	
4	Minnesota United	10	3	5	2	15	13	+2	14	
5	Indy Eleven	10	3	4	3	13	12	+1	13	
6	Jacksonville Armada	10	3	3	4	15	18	−3	12	
7	San Antonio Scorpions	10	3	3	4	11	15	−4	12	
8	Fort Lauderdale Strikers	10	3	2	5	12	13	−1	11	
9	Ottawa Fury	10	2	5	3	5	8	−3	11	
10	FC Edmonton	10	2	3	5	16	22	−6	9	
11	Atlanta Silverbacks	10	1	5	4	7	13	−6	8	

Source: NASL
Rules for classification: 1) points; 2) total goal differential; 3) total goals scored; 4) head-to-head record; 5) away goal differential; 6) away goals scored
(S) Spring season champion

==== Results summary ====
Overall								Home						Away					
Pld	W	D	L	GF	GA	GD	Pts	W	D	L	GF	GA	GD	W	D	L	GF	GA	GD
10	3	5	2	15	13	+2	14	2	2	1	9	8	+1	1	3	1	6	5	+1

Last updated: July 15, 2015.
Source: Match reports

==== Results by round ====
Round	1	2	3	4	5	6	7	8	9	10
Stadium	A	A	H	A	H	A	H	H	A	H
Result	D	L	D	D	W	W	W	D	D	L
Position	8	10	10	10	8	4	2	3	4	4

Updated to match(es) played on June 15, 2015. Source: Match reports
A = Away; H = Home; W = Win; D = Draw; L = Loss

==== Matches ====
Win Loss Draw

April 11, 2015 Match 1	Tampa Bay Rowdies	0–0	Minnesota United FC	St. Petersburg, Florida
6:30 p.m. CDT	Hernández (yellow card) 21'; King (yellow card) 37'; Mkandawire (yellow card) 63'; Chavez (yellow card) 90'	Report	Venegas (yellow card) 12'; Campos (yellow card) 89'	Stadium: Al Lang Stadium; Attendance: 7,010; Referee: Kevin Terry Jr.

April 18, 2015 Match 2	Ottawa Fury FC	1–0	Minnesota United FC	Ottawa, Ontario
3:00 p.m. CDT	Falvey (yellow card) 24'; Heinemann 68'; Wiedeman (yellow card) 79'	Report	Ndjock (yellow card) 21'	Stadium: TD Place Stadium; Attendance: 5,093; Referee: Justin Tasev

April 25, 2015 Match 3	Minnesota United FC	2–2	San Antonio Scorpions	Blaine, Minnesota
7:00 p.m. CDT	Ramirez (yellow card) 25', (goal) 59' (pen.); Campos 34'; Ibarra (yellow card) 55'	Report	Tsiskaridze 8', (yellow card) 31'; Attakora (yellow card) 61'; Castillo 90+1' (pen.)	Stadium: National Sports Center; Attendance: 9,233; Referee: Alejandro Mariscal

May 3, 2015 Match 4 Flyover Cup	FC Edmonton	2–2	Minnesota United FC	Edmonton, Alberta
2:00 p.m. CDT	Raudales (yellow card) 41'; Nyassi (yellow card) 47'; Laing 51'; Watson (yellow card) 56'; Ameobi 71'; Fordyce (red card) 84'	Report	Ibarra 2'; Watson (yellow card) 80', (goal) 85' (pen.); Campos (yellow card) 86'	Stadium: Clarke Stadium; Attendance: 2,896; Referee: Justin Tasev

May 9, 2015 Match 5	Minnesota United FC	1–0	Atlanta Silverbacks	Blaine, Minnesota
7:00 p.m. CDT	Campos 43'; Pitchkolan (yellow card) 56'	Report	Okafor (yellow card) 76'; Oppong (yellow card) 87'	Stadium: National Sports Center; Attendance: 9,058; Referee: Baboucarr Jallow

May 16, 2015 Match 6	Indy Eleven	1–3	Minnesota United FC	Indianapolis, Indiana
6:30 p.m. CDT	Peña 49'	Report	Alhassan 22'; Campos (yellow card) 35'; Davis 63'; Vicentini 63'	Stadium: Carroll Stadium; Attendance: 10,524; Referee: David Gantar

May 23, 2015 Match 7	Minnesota United FC	3–2	Jacksonville Armada	Blaine, Minnesota
7:00 p.m. CDT	Dias (yellow card) 1'; Campos 53' (pen.), (yellow card) 79'; Calvano 59', (yellow card) 82'; Ibarra 76'	Report	Nicklaw (yellow card) 13'; Scaglia (yellow card) 34'; Trejo (yellow card) 69'; Milien 71'; Johnson 83'	Stadium: National Sports Center; Attendance: 9,012; Referee: Daniel Fitzgerald

May 30, 2015 Match 8	Minnesota United FC	1–1	New York Cosmos	Blaine, Minnesota
7:00 p.m. CDT	Campos 9'; Vicentini (yellow card) 30'; Davis (yellow card) 44'; Ibson (yellow card) 79'	Report	Moffat (yellow card) 22'; Raúl 90'	Stadium: National Sports Center; Attendance: 9,317; Referee: Daniel Radford

June 6, 2015 Match 9	Carolina RailHawks	1–1	Minnesota United FC	Cary, North Carolina
6:30 p.m. CDT	Novo 80', (red card) 86'	Report	Banks 48'	Stadium: WakeMed Soccer Park; Attendance: 4,863; Referee: Mark Kadlecik

June 13, 2015 Match 10	Minnesota United FC	2–3	Fort Lauderdale Strikers	Blaine, Minnesota
7:00 p.m. CDT	Ibarra 18' (pen.); Mendes (yellow card) 26'; Pitchkolan 38'	Report	Pinho 3', 80', (yellow card) 67'; Angulo 78', (red card) 84'	Stadium: National Sports Center; Attendance: 9,342; Referee: Nima Saghafi

=== NASL Fall Championship ===
Pos	Team	Pld	W	D	L	GF	GA	GD	Pts	Qualification
1	Ottawa Fury (F)	20	13	6	1	37	15	+22	45	Playoffs
2	Minnesota United	20	11	6	3	39	26	+13	39	
3	New York Cosmos	20	10	6	4	31	21	+10	36	
4	Fort Lauderdale Strikers	20	8	6	6	37	27	+10	30	
5	FC Edmonton	20	7	5	8	25	24	+1	26	
6	Atlanta Silverbacks	20	6	7	7	24	27	−3	25	
7	Carolina RailHawks	20	6	3	11	29	39	−10	21	
8	Tampa Bay Rowdies	20	5	5	10	18	28	−10	20	
9	Indy Eleven	20	5	5	10	23	36	−13	20	
10	San Antonio Scorpions	20	4	7	9	30	37	−7	19	
11	Jacksonville Armada	20	5	4	11	18	31	−13	19	

Source: NASL
Rules for classification: 1) points; 2) total goal differential; 3) total goals scored; 4) head-to-head record; 5) away goal differential; 6) away goals scored
(F) Fall season champion

==== Results summary ====
Overall								Home						Away					
Pld	W	D	L	GF	GA	GD	Pts	W	D	L	GF	GA	GD	W	D	L	GF	GA	GD
20	11	6	3	39	26	+13	39	6	4	0	16	6	+10	5	2	3	23	20	+3

Last updated: October 31, 2015.
Source: Match reports

==== Results by round ====
Round	1	2	3	4	5	6	7	8	9	10	11	12	13	14	15	16	17	18	19	20
Stadium	A	H	H	A	A	A	H	A	A	H	A	H	A	H	A	H	H	A	H	H
Result	L	D	W	W	D	L	D	W	W	W	D	W	W	D	W	W	W	L	W	D
Position	9	10	2	3	3	3	4	4	2	3	2	2	2	2	2	2	2	2	2	2

Updated to match(es) played on October 31, 2015. Source: Match reports
A = Away; H = Home; W = Win; D = Draw; L = Loss

==== Matches ====
Win Loss Draw

July 4, 2015 Match 1	Carolina RailHawks	3–1	Minnesota United FC	Cary, North Carolina
4:00 p.m. CDT	Bracalello 15'; Shipalane 17'; Low (yellow card) 28'; Thompson (yellow card) 41' (yellow-red card) 60'; Da Luz 57'	Report	Mendes 26'; Venegas (yellow card) 27'; Vicentini (yellow card) 57'; Dias (yellow card) 89'	Stadium: WakeMed Soccer Park; Attendance: 3,075; Referee: Robert Sibiga

July 11, 2015 Match 2	Minnesota United FC	1–1	Ottawa Fury	Blaine, Minnesota
7:00 p.m. CDT	Ibson (yellow card) 15'; Ramirez 32'; Pitchkolan (yellow card) 80'; Calvano (yellow card) 88'	Report	Richter (yellow card) 11'; Eustaquio (yellow card) 31'; Heinemann 75' (pen.)	Stadium: National Sports Center; Attendance: 9,030; Referee: Nima Saghafi

July 15, 2015 Match 3	Minnesota United FC	4–0	Jacksonville Armada	Blaine, Minnesota
7:00 p.m. CDT	Vicentini 13'; Bre. Kallman (yellow card) 16'; Mendes 50'; Ramirez 60'; Ibson 75'; Banks (yellow card) 78'; Pitchkolan (yellow card) 81'	Report	Keita (yellow card) 20' (red card) 45+'; Ortiz (yellow card) 90+'	Stadium: National Sports Center; Attendance: 9,412; Referee: Tyler Ploeger

July 25, 2015 Match 4	San Antonio Scorpions	3–4	Minnesota United FC	San Antonio, Texas
7:30 p.m. CDT	Cann 16'; Castillo 33' (pen.), 86' (pen.), (yellow card) 77'; Chávez (yellow card) 44'; Rusin (yellow card) 89'; Hassli (yellow card) 90' (yellow-red card) 90'	Report	Ramirez 11'; Calvano (yellow card) 15'; Davis 22', (yellow card) 85'; Ibson 37'; Alhassan 48'	Stadium: Toyota Field; Attendance: 7,087; Referee: Daniel Fitzgerald

July 31, 2015 Match 5	Jacksonville Armada	3–3	Minnesota United FC	Jacksonville, Florida
6:00 p.m. CDT	Johnson 5', (yellow card) 37'; Barrett 23'; Nicklaw (yellow card) 41' (yellow-red card) 83'; Keita 72'; Castrillón (yellow card) 79'; Scaglia (yellow card) 86'	Report	Ramirez 21'; Calvano (yellow card) 50'; Alhassan (yellow card) 64'; Davis 78'; Ibson 84'	Stadium: Baseball Grounds of Jacksonville; Attendance: 6,847; Referee: Marcos De Oliveira; Man of the Match: Christian Ramirez

August 5, 2015 Match 6	New York Cosmos	2–1	Minnesota United FC	Hempstead, New York
6:00 p.m. CDT	Restrepo 13'; Freeman 76'; Fernandes (yellow card) 78'; Szetela (yellow card) 88'; Maurer (yellow card) 90'	Report	Ramirez 8'; Campos (yellow card) 51'; Ibson (yellow card) 87'	Stadium: James M. Shuart Stadium; Referee: Mark Kadlecik; Man of the Match: Christian Ramirez

August 8, 2015 Match 7 Flyover Cup	Minnesota United FC	1–1	FC Edmonton	Blaine, Minnesota
7:00 p.m. CDT	Alhassan (yellow card) 40'; Ramirez 47' (pen.); Davis (yellow card) 70'; Vicentini (yellow card) 88'	Report	Raudales (yellow card) 34'; Laing (yellow card) 58'; Ameobi 71' de Freitas (yellow card) 82'	Stadium: National Sports Center; Attendance: 9,077; Referee: Daniel Radford; Man of the Match: Yago Silva

August 15, 2015 Match 8	Ottawa Fury	1–2	Minnesota United FC	Ottawa, Ontario
6:00 p.m. CDT	Minatel (yellow card) 19'; Wiedeman 73'	Report	Calvano (yellow card) 11'; Ramirez 17'; Silva (yellow card) 40'; Vicentini (yellow card) 62'; Mendes 90', (yellow card) 90'	Stadium: TD Place Stadium; Attendance: 6,899; Referee: Lyes Arfa; Man of the Match: Daniel Mendes

August 22, 2015 Match 9	Tampa Bay Rowdies	1–3	Minnesota United FC	St. Petersburg, Florida
6:30 p.m. CDT	Guerra 28'; Sweat (yellow card) 51'; Menjivar (yellow card) 90'	Report	Ibson 36'; Davis 65'; Vicentini (yellow card) 90'; Mendes 90'	Stadium: Al Lang Stadium; Attendance: 5,059; Referee: Rubiel Vazquez; Man of the Match: Justin Davis

September 2, 2015 Match 10	Minnesota United FC	1–0	Indy Eleven	Blaine, Minnesota
7:00 p.m. CDT	Moura (yellow card) 24'; Pitchkolan (yellow card) 66'; Davis 77'	Report	Richards (yellow card) 17'	Stadium: National Sports Center; Attendance: 7,137; Referee: Fotis Bazakos; Man of the Match: Sammy N'Djock

September 6, 2015 Match 11; Flyover Cup	FC Edmonton	1–1	Minnesota United FC	Edmonton, Alberta
4:00 p.m. CDT	Nonni (yellow card) 13' (yellow-red card) 25'; Raudales (yellow card) 17'; Fordyce 90'	Report	Alhassan 11'	Stadium: Clarke Stadium; Attendance: 3,156; Referee: Yusri Rudolf; Man of the Match: Kalif Alhassan

September 12, 2015 Match 12	Minnesota United FC	3–1	Carolina RailHawks	Blaine, Minnesota
7:00 p.m. CDT	Calvano (yellow card) 23'; Mendes (yellow card) 67'; Scott 72' (o.g.); Campos 76', (yellow card) 77'; Venegas 81'	Report	Danso 4'; Engel (yellow card) 45' da Luz (yellow card) 71'	Stadium: National Sports Center; Attendance: 8,222; Referee: Alejandro Mariscal; Man of the Match: Kevin Venegas

September 15, 2015 Match 13	Atlanta Silverbacks	1–2	Minnesota United FC	Atlanta
7:00 p.m. CDT	McKenzie (red card) 4'; Mendes 9'	Report	Gotsmanov (yellow card) 7'; Ramirez 28'; Vicentini (yellow card) 60' (yellow-red card) 90'; J. C. Banks 83'; Vela (yellow card) 89'	Stadium: Atlanta Silverbacks Park; Attendance: 2,302; Referee: Nima Saghafi; Man of the Match: Christian Ramirez

September 19, 2015 Match 14	Minnesota United FC	0–0	New York Cosmos	Blaine, Minnesota
7:00 p.m. CDT	Ibson (yellow card) 45+'; Davis (yellow card) 56'; Calvano (yellow card) 90'	Report	Bover (yellow card) 74'; Guenzatti (yellow card) 90+'	Stadium: National Sports Center; Attendance: 9,418; Referee: Daniel Fitzgerald; Man of the Match: Sammy N'Djock

September 26, 2015 Match 15	Fort Lauderdale Strikers	2–5	Minnesota United FC	Fort Lauderdale, Florida
6:00 p.m. CDT	Angulo 7', 88'; Chin (yellow card) 52'; Ramírez (yellow card) 54'; Borrajo (yellow card) 70'	Report	Ramirez 12'; Alhassan 27'; Calvano (yellow card) 42'; Mendes 44'; Ibson 61', 87'	Stadium: Lockhart Stadium; Attendance: 2,903; Referee: Mathieu Bourdeau; Man of the Match: Ibson

October 3, 2015 Match 16	Minnesota United FC	1–0	Tampa Bay Rowdies	Blaine, Minnesota
7:00 p.m. CDT	Vela (yellow card) 35'; Ramirez 44'; Jordan (yellow card) 74'; Davis (yellow card) 86'	Report	Sweat (yellow card) 31' (yellow-red card) 41'	Stadium: National Sports Center; Attendance: 8,932; Referee: Younes Marrakchi; Man of the Match: Christian Ramirez

October 10, 2015 Match 17	Minnesota United FC	2–1	Fort Lauderdale Strikers	Blaine, Minnesota
7:00 p.m. CDT	Campos 6'; Mendes 27'; Calvano (yellow card) 63'; Davis (yellow card) 90+'	Report	PC 78'; Sanfilippo (yellow card) 85'	Stadium: National Sports Center; Attendance: 9,207; Referee: David Gantar; Man of the Match: Greg Jordan

October 17, 2015 Match 18	Indy Eleven	3-1	Minnesota United FC	Indianapolis, Indiana
6:00 p.m. CDT	Mares 39'; Brown 65'; Ring 83', (yellow card) 89'	Report	Venegas (yellow card) 81'; Kallman 85', (yellow card) 89'; Pitchkolan (yellow card) 89'	Stadium: Michael Carroll Stadium; Attendance: 9,085; Referee: Jose Carlos Rivero; Man of the Match: Greg Jordan

October 24, 2015 Match 19	Minnesota United FC	1–0	Atlanta Silverbacks	Blaine, Minnesota
7:00 p.m. CDT	Ramirez 9' (pen.)	Report	McKenzie (yellow card) 9'; Mensing (yellow card) 33'	Stadium: National Sports Center; Attendance: 9,212; Referee: Alex Chilowicz; Man of the Match: Brent Kallman

October 31, 2015 Match 20	Minnesota United FC	2–2	San Antonio Scorpions	Blaine, Minnesota
7:00 p.m. CDT	Campos 70' (pen.); Venegas 90'	Report	Gentile 54'; Castillo 85' (pen.)	Stadium: National Sports Center; Attendance: 5,890; Referee: Robert Sibiga; Man of the Match: Kevin Venegas

=== NASL Playoffs ===
Pos	Team	Pld	W	D	L	GF	GA	GD	Pts	Qualification
1	New York Cosmos (C, X)	30	15	11	4	49	30	+19	56	Championship qualifiers (Note: As spring season champions)
2	Ottawa Fury	30	15	11	4	42	23	+19	56	Championship qualifiers (Note: As fall season champions)
3	Minnesota United	30	14	11	5	54	39	+15	53	Championship qualifiers (Note: As next best teams in overall standings)
4	Fort Lauderdale Strikers	30	11	8	11	49	40	+9	41	Championship qualifiers
5	Tampa Bay Rowdies	30	10	9	11	33	37	−4	39	
6	Carolina RailHawks	30	9	8	13	44	49	−5	35	
7	FC Edmonton	30	9	8	13	41	46	−5	35	
8	Atlanta Silverbacks	30	7	12	11	31	40	−9	33	
9	Indy Eleven	30	8	9	13	36	48	−12	33	
10	San Antonio Scorpions	30	7	10	13	41	52	−11	31	
11	Jacksonville Armada	30	8	7	15	33	49	−16	31	

Source: NASL
Rules for classification: 1) points; 2) total goal differential; 3) total goals scored; 4) head-to-head record; 5) away goal differential; 6) away goals scored
(C) Champions; (X) Regular season champion

==== Semi-finals ====
November 8, 2015	Ottawa Fury FC (2)	2–1 (a.e.t.)	Minnesota United FC (3)	Ottawa, Ontario
2:00 p.m. CST	Heinemann (yellow card) 9' (goal) 47', 108'; Trafford (yellow card) 104'	Report	Calvano (yellow card) 2'; Ramirez 7' (pen.); Ibson (yellow card) 45'; Mendes (yellow card) 45'; Vicentini (yellow card) 100'; Jordan (yellow card) 120'	Stadium: TD Place Stadium; Attendance: 9,346; Referee: Mathieu Bourdeau

=== U.S. Open Cup ===
May 27, 2015 Third round	Saint Louis FC (Missouri)	1–1 (a.e.t.) (3–1 p)	Minnesota United FC	Fenton, Missouri
7:00 p.m. CDT	Gaul 80' (pen.); Renken (yellow card) 90'; Lynch (yellow card) 94'; Gaul (red card) 114'	Report	Kallman (yellow card) 20'; Banks 53'; Ibson (yellow card) 114'; Polak (yellow card) 118'	Stadium: World Wide Technology Soccer Park; Attendance: 2,579; Referee: Jon Freemon
	Penalties
	Barklage (penalty scored); Doody (penalty scored); Gasecki (penalty scored)		Mendes (penalty missed); Ibson (penalty missed); Ibarra (penalty scored); Ramirez (penalty missed)

== Squad statistics ==
As of match played November 8, 2015

=== Appearances and goals ===
No.	Pos	Nat	Player	Total		NASL Spring Season		NASL Fall Season		Playoffs		U.S. Open Cup	
No.	Pos	Nat	Player	Apps	Goals	Apps	Goals	Apps	Goals	Apps	Goals	Apps	Goals
1	GK	(United States) USA	Mitch Hildebrandt	8	0	2	0	5	0	0	0	1	0
2	DF	(United States) USA	Justin Davis	30	5	10	1	19	4	1	0	0	0
3	DF	(Brazil) BRA	Cristiano	12	0	10	0	2	0	0	0	0	0
4	MF	(United States) USA	Aaron Pitchkolan	31	1	9+1	1	18+1	0	1	0	1	0
5	DF	(Brazil) BRA	Tiago	29	1	10	1	18	0	1	0	0	0
6	DF	(United States) USA	Brent Kallman	9	1	0	0	8	1	0	0	1	0
7	MF	(United States) USA	Kevin Venegas	29	2	9	0	19	2	1	0	0	0
8	MF	(Brazil) BRA	Ibson	27	6	5	0	20	6	1	0	0+1	0
9	FW	(Brazil) BRA	Pablo Campos	30	7	8+2	4	4+14	3	0+1	0	0+1	0
11	MF	(Ghana) GHA	Kalif Alhassan	28	4	3+4	1	19+1	3	1	0	0	0
13	MF	(United States) USA	Jamie Watson	4	1	2+2	1	0	0	0	0	0	0
14	DF	(United States) USA	Brian Kallman	5	0	1+1	0	1+1	0	0	0	1	0
16	DF	(United States) USA	Tyler Polak	2	0	0	0	1	0	0	0	1	0
17	MF	(Brazil) BRA	Yago	11	0	0	0	6+5	0	0	0	0	0
18	FW	(Brazil) BRA	Daniel Mendes	27	6	5	0	14+6	6	1	0	0+1	0
19	MF	(Mexico) MEX	Alejandro Vela	9	0	0	0	0+8	0	0+1	0	0	0
20	MF	(Belarus) BLR	Andrei Gotsmanov	6	0	0	0	1+5	0	0	0	0	0
21	FW	(United States) USA	Christian Ramirez	32	13	4+6	1	19+1	11	1	1	1	0
23	MF	(United States) USA	Greg Jordan	25	0	2+5	0	14+2	0	1	0	1	0
29	FW	(United States) USA	J. C. Banks	20	3	2+4	1	2+10	1	0+1	0	1	1
33	GK	(Cameroon) CMR	Sammy Ndjock	24	0	8	0	15	0	1	0	0	0
77	MF	(Brazil) BRA	Juliano Vicentini	23	2	7	1	14+1	1	1	0	0	0
99	FW	(Brazil) BRA	Geison Moura	8	0	0+2	0	1+4	0	0	0	1	0
Players who left Minnesota United during the season:
10	MF	(United States) USA	Miguel Ibarra	10	3	9	3	0	0	0	0	1	0
22	MF	(Northern Ireland) NIR	Jonny Steele	6	0	4+1	0	0	0	0	0	1	0

=== Goal scorers ===
As of match played October 31, 2015

Place	Position	Nation	Number	Name	NASL Spring Season	NASL Fall Season	Playoffs	U.S. Open Cup	Total
1	FW	(United States)	21	Christian Ramirez	1	11	1	0	13
2	FW	(Brazil)	9	Pablo Campos	4	3	0	0	7
3	MF	(Brazil)	8	Ibson	0	6	0	0	6
3	FW	(Brazil)	18	Daniel Mendes	0	6	0	0	6
5	DF	(United States)	2	Justin Davis	1	4	0	0	5
6	MF	(Ghana)	11	Kalif Alhassan	1	3	0	0	4
7	MF	(United States)	10	Miguel Ibarra	3	0	0	0	3
7	FW	(United States)	29	J. C. Banks	1	1	0	1	3
9	MF	(United States)	7	Kevin Venegas	0	2	0	0	2
9	MF	(Brazil)	77	Juliano Vicentini	1	1	0	0	2
11	MF	(United States)	4	Aaron Pitchkolan	1	0	0	0	1
11	DF	(Brazil)	5	Tiago	1	0	0	0	1
11	MF	(United States)	13	Jamie Watson	1	0	0	0	1
11	DF	(United States)	6	Brent Kallman	0	1	0	0	1
11				Own goal	0	1	0	0	1
TOTALS					15	39	1	1	56

=== Disciplinary record ===
As of match played October 31, 2015

No.	Pos.	Player	NASL Spring Season		NASL Fall Season		NASL Playoffs		U.S. Open Cup		Total	
No.	Pos.	Player	Yellow card	Red card	Yellow card	Red card	Yellow card	Red card	Yellow card	Red card	Yellow card	Red card
2	DF	(United States) Justin Davis	1	0	4	0	0	0	0	0	5	0
3	DF	(Brazil) Cristiano Dias	1	0	1	0	0	0	0	0	2	0
4	MF	(United States) Aaron Pitchkolan	1	0	4	0	0	0	0	0	5	0
5	DF	(Brazil) Tiago Calvano	1	0	8	0	1	0	0	0	10	0
6	DF	(United States) Brent Kallman	0	0	2	0	0	0	1	0	3	0
7	DF	(United States) Kevin Venegas	1	0	2	0	0	0	0	0	3	0
8	MF	(Brazil) Ibson	1	0	4	0	1	0	1	0	7	0
9	FW	(Brazil) Pablo Campos	4	0	2	0	0	0	0	0	6	0
10	MF	(United States) Miguel Ibarra	1	0	0	0	0	0	0	0	1	0
11	MF	(Ghana) Kalif Alhassan	0	0	2	0	0	0	0	0	2	0
13	MF	(United States) Jamie Watson	1	0	0	0	0	0	0	0	1	0
16	DF	(United States) Tyler Polak	0	0	0	0	0	0	1	0	1	0
17	DF	(Brazil) Yago Silva	0	0	1	0	0	0	0	0	1	0
18	FW	(Brazil) Daniel Mendes	1	0	2	0	1	0	0	0	4	0
19	MF	(Mexico) Alejandro Vela	0	0	2	0	0	0	0	0	2	0
20	MF	(Belarus) Andrei Gotsmanov	0	0	1	0	0	0	0	0	1	0
21	FW	(United States) Christian Ramirez	1	0	0	0	0	0	0	0	1	0
23	MF	(United States) Greg Jordan	0	0	1	0	1	0	0	0	2	0
29	FW	(United States) J. C. Banks	0	0	1	0	0	0	0	0	1	0
33	GK	(Cameroon) Sammy N'Djock	1	0	0	0	0	0	0	0	1	0
77	MF	(Brazil) Juliano Vicentini	1	0	5	1	1	0	0	0	7	1
99	FW	(Brazil) Geison Moura	0	0	1	0	0	0	0	0	1	0

== See also ==
- Minnesota United FC
- 2015 North American Soccer League season
- 2015 in American soccer
