= 2016 Minnesota United FC season =

Minnesota United FC
2016 season
- Owner: Bill McGuire
- President: Nick Rogers
- Head coach: Carl Craig
- Stadium: National Sports Center; Target Field (One match)
- NASL: Spring: 4th Fall: 8th Overall: 5th Soccer Bowl: DNQ
- U.S. Open Cup: Fourth Round
- Top goalscorer: League: Christian Ramirez (18); All: Christian Ramirez (19)
- Highest home attendance: League: 9,460 (July 16 vs. Indy); All: 18,505 (June 25 vs. Club León at Target Field)
- Lowest home attendance: League: 6,101 (August 3 vs. Puerto Rico); All: 6,101 (August 3 vs. Puerto Rico)
- Average home league attendance: League: 8,573; All: 9,036
Home colors	Away colors

The 2016 season was Minnesota United FC's seventh season of existence and their sixth consecutive and final season playing in the North American Soccer League, the second division of the American soccer pyramid. In 2017, Minnesota United FC joined MLS as an expansion team along with Atlanta United FC.

== Club ==
As of match played June 1, 2016

No.	Name	Nationality	Position	Date of birth (age)	Signed from	Signed in	Contract ends	Apps.	Goals
Goalkeepers
1	Aaron Perez	(United States)	GK	28 August 1986 (age 40)	Orange County Blues	2016		0	0
12	Steward Ceus	(Haiti)	GK	26 March 1987 (age 39)	Atlanta Silverbacks	2016		0	0
24	Kristian Nicht	(Germany)	GK	3 April 1982 (age 44)	Indy Eleven	2016		0	0
33	Sammy Ndjock	(Cameroon)	GK	25 February 1990 (age 36)	(Turkey) Antalyaspor	2015		33	0
Defenders
2	Justin Davis	(United States)	DF	6 May 1988 (age 38)	New Mexico Lobos	2011			
3	Jeb Brovsky	(United States)	DF	3 December 1988 (age 37)	New York City	2016		8	0
5	Tiago	(Brazil)	DF	19 May 1981 (age 45)	(Australia) Sydney	2014		61	1
6	Brent Kallman	(United States)	DF	4 October 1990 (age 35)	Des Moines Menace	2013		22	1
31	Damion Lowe	(Jamaica)	DF	5 May 1993 (age 33)	Loan from Seattle Sounders FC	2016		8	0
37	Chris Klute	(United States)	DF	5 March 1990 (age 36)	Portland Timbers	2016			
Midfielder
4	Aaron Pitchkolan	(United States)	MF	14 March 1983 (age 43)	San Antonio Scorpions	2013			
7	Ibson	(Brazil)	MF	7 November 1983 (age 42)	(Italy) Bologna	2015		31	6
13	Jamie Watson	(United States)	MF	10 April 1986 (aged 29)	Orlando City	2014		32	3
14	Jack Blake	(Scotland)	MF	22 September 1994 (age 31)	(England) Nottingham Forest	2016		1	1
17	Lance Laing	(Jamaica)	MF	28 February 1988 (age 38)	Edmonton	2016		7	0
22	Kevin Venegas	(United States)	MF	29 July 1989 (age 37)	Fullerton Titans	2010			
23	Greg Jordan	(United States)	MF	5 April 1990 (age 36)	Philadelphia Union	2014		51	1
77	Juliano Vicentini	(Brazil)	MF	26 August 1981 (age 45)	(Brazil) Audax	2014		55	3
Forwards
8	Danny Cruz	(United States)	FW	3 January 1990 (age 36)	Philadelphia Union	2016		8	0
9	Bernardo Añor	(Venezuela)	FW	24 May 1988 (age 38)	Loan from Sporting Kansas City	2016		6	0
10	Ben Speas	(United States)	FW	17 January 1991 (age 35)	Columbus Crew	2016		6	3
11	Stefano Pinho	(Brazil)	FW	12 January 1991 (age 35)	(Brazil) Fluminense	2016		8	0
15	Ismaila Jome	(The Gambia)	FW	4 November 1994 (age 31)	UC Santa Barbara	2016		0	0
18	Daniel Mendes	(Brazil)	FW	18 January 1981 (age 45)	(Sweden) Kalmar	2015		56	15
21	Christian Ramirez	(United States)	FW	4 April 1991 (age 35)	Charlotte Eagles	2014		71	38
29	J. C. Banks	(United States)	FW	24 August 1989 (age 37)	Rochester Rhinos	2015		26	3

== Transfers ==
=== Transfers in ===
Entry date	Position	No.	Player	From club	Fee	Ref.
December 4, 2015	FW	11	(Brazil) Stefano Pinho	(Brazil) Fluminense FC	Undisclosed	
December 15, 2015	MF	17	(Jamaica) Lance Laing	(Canada) FC Edmonton	Undisclosed	
February 5, 2016	GK	24	(Germany) Kristian Nicht	(United States) Indy Eleven	Free	
February 8, 2016	FW	8	(United States) Danny Cruz	(United States) Philadelphia Union	Free	
February 12, 2016	FW	10	(United States) Ben Speas	(United States) Columbus Crew	Free	
March 4, 2016	FW	15	(The Gambia) Ismaila Jome	(United States) UC Santa Barbara	Free	
March 28, 2016	DF	3	(United States) Jeb Brovsky	(United States) New York City FC	Free	
May 4, 2016	GK	12	(Haiti) Steward Ceus	(United States) Atlanta Silverbacks	Free	
May 26, 2016	MF	14	(Scotland) Jack Blake	(England) Nottingham Forest	Free	

=== Transfers out ===
Exit date	Position	No.	Player	To club	Fee	Ref.
December 7, 2015	GK	1	(United States) Mitch Hildebrandt	(United States) FC Cincinnati	Contract Expired	
December 7, 2015	DF	16	(United States) Tyler Polak	(United States) FC Cincinnati	Contract Expired	
December 17, 2015	FW	11	(Ghana) Kalif Alhassan	(United States) Tampa Bay Rowdies	Option Declined	
December 17, 2015	MF	17	(Brazil) Yago Silva	(Brazil) Vasco	End of Loan	
December 17, 2015	MF	19	(Mexico) Alejandro Vela	(Mexico) Club Necaxa	Option Declined	
December 17, 2015	MF	99	(Brazil) Geison Moura	(United States) Fort Lauderdale Strikers	Contract Expired	
January 30, 2016	DF	14	(United States) Brian Kallman	n/a	Retired	
February 1, 2016	DF	3	(Brazil) Cristiano Dias	Puerto Rico FC	Released	
February 1, 2016	FW	9	(Brazil) Pablo Campos	(United States) Miami FC	Released	
February 1, 2016	GK	24	(United States) Andrew Fontein	Free Agent	Released	
April 12, 2016	MF	20	(Belarus) Andrei Gotsmanov	Free Agent	Released	

=== Loans in ===
Start date	End date	Position	No.	Player	From club	Ref.
February 17, 2016	End of Season	FW	9	(Venezuela) Bernardo Añor	(United States) Sporting Kansas City	
March 4, 2016	End of Season	DF	31	(Jamaica) Damion Lowe	(United States) Seattle Sounders FC	
September 7, 2016	End of Season	DF	37	(United States) Chris Klute	(United States) Portland Timbers	

=== Management ===
- (United States) Nick Rogers – President
- (United States) Manny Lagos – Sporting Director
- (England) Carl Craig – Head Coach
- (United States) Ian Fuller – Assistant Coach
- (England) Paul O'Connor – Goalkeeping Coach
- (United States) Peter Rivard – Reserves Team Coach
- (Scotland) Craig Mallace – Director of Camps & Youth Development
- (United States) Dr. Corey Wulf – Team Doctor
- (United States) Dr. Brad Moser – Team Doctor
- (United States) Yoshiyuki Ono – Team Athletic Trainer
- (United States) David Bloomquist – Team Athletic Trainer

== Friendlies ==
Win Loss Draw

=== Simple Invitational ===
Pos	Team	GP	W	L	D	GF	GA	GD	Pts
1	(United States) Chicago Fire	3	3	0	0	9	2	+7	9
2	(Canada) Vancouver Whitecaps FC	3	2	1	0	7	4	+3	6
3	(United States) Portland Timbers	3	1	2	0	4	4	0	3
4	(United States) Minnesota United FC	3	0	3	0	1	11	-10	0

February 21, 2016 SI1	Portland Timbers	4–0	Minnesota United	Portland, Oregon
7:00 p.m. CST	Adi 11' (pen.); Melano 36'; Nagbe 56'; Valeri 63' (pen.); Taylor (yellow card) 81'	Report	Calvano (red card) 45'; Venegas (red card) 62'; Walls (yellow card) 76'	Stadium: Providence Park; Attendance: 13,431

February 24, 2016 SI2	Minnesota United	0–4	Chicago Fire	Portland, Oregon
7:00 p.m. CST	Lowe (yellow card) 75'	Report	Calistri 24', 35'; Polster (yellow card) 42'; Doody (yellow card) 55'; Bryce 62'; Álvarez 88' (pen.)	Stadium: Providence Park

February 27, 2016 SI3	Vancouver Whitecaps FC	3–1	Minnesota United	Portland, Oregon
4:30 p.m. CST	Morales 15', 41' (pen.), (yellow card) 87'; Rivero 31'; Froese (yellow card) 43' (yellow-red card) 62'	Report	Venegas (red card) 48'; Lowe 79'	Stadium: Providence Park

=== Pre-season ===
March 5, 2016 Friendly	Minnesota United	2–0	University of Nebraska Omaha	Minneapolis
1:00 p.m. CST	Ramirez; Pitchkolan	Summary		Stadium: Parade Field

March 9, 2016 Friendly	C.F. Pachuca Reserves (Mexico)	1–2	(United States) Minnesota United	Pachuca, Hidalgo, Mexico
11:00 a.m. CST	16'	Report	Ramirez 31'; Laing 76'

March 12, 2016 Friendly	Mexico U20 National Team	2–2	(United States) Minnesota United	Pachuca, Hidalgo, Mexico
11:00 a.m. CST	10'; 13'	Report	Lowe (red card) 9'; Ramirez 30'; Álvarez 76'	Stadium: Estadio Hidalgo

March 16, 2016 Friendly	Cruz Azul (Mexico)	1–1	(United States) Minnesota United	Mexico City, Mexico
1:00 p.m. CDT	34'	Report	Lowe 48'

=== Mid-season ===
June 25, 2016 Friendly	Minnesota United (United States)	2–4	(Mexico) Club León	Minneapolis
7:00 p.m. CDT	Ramirez 63'; Banks 69'	Report	Cano 25'; Kallman 49' (o.g.); Boselli (yellow card) 69'; Cuevas 75', 84'	Stadium: Target Field; Attendance: 18,505

July 20, 2016 Friendly	Minnesota United (United States)	0–4	(England) A.F.C. Bournemouth	Blaine, Minnesota
7:00 p.m. CDT	Brovsky (yellow card) 72'; Lowe (red card) 79'	Report	Wilson 24', 39'; Ndjock 26' (o.g.); Gradel (red card) 79'; Grabban 86'	Stadium: National Sports Center; Attendance: 8,333

== Competitions ==
=== Overview ===
Competition	Record							
Competition	G	W	D	L	GF	GA	GD	Win %
NASL Spring Season	10	5	1	4	16	12	+4	50.00
NASL Fall Season	22	6	7	9	25	25	+0	27.27
U.S. Open Cup	2	1	0	1	3	2	+1	50.00
Total	34	12	8	14	44	39	+5	35.29

Updated to match played November 4, 2016
Source: Competitions

=== NASL Spring Championship ===
Pos	Team	Pld	W	D	L	GF	GA	GD	Pts	Qualification
1	Indy Eleven (S)	10	4	6	0	15	8	+7	18	Playoffs
2	New York Cosmos	10	6	0	4	15	8	+7	18	
3	FC Edmonton	10	5	2	3	9	7	+2	17	
4	Minnesota United	10	5	1	4	16	12	+4	16	
5	Tampa Bay Rowdies	10	4	4	2	11	9	+2	16	
6	Fort Lauderdale Strikers	10	4	3	3	12	12	0	15	
7	Carolina RailHawks	10	4	2	4	11	13	−2	14	
8	Rayo OKC	10	3	3	4	11	12	−1	12	
9	Ottawa Fury	10	2	3	5	9	14	−5	9	
10	Jacksonville Armada	10	1	4	5	5	11	−6	7	
11	Miami FC	10	1	4	5	7	15	−8	7	

Source: NASL
Rules for classification: 1) points; 2) total goal differential; 3) total goals scored; 4) head-to-head record; 5) away goal differential; 6) away goals scored
(S) Spring season champion

==== Results summary ====
Overall								Home						Away					
Pld	W	D	L	GF	GA	GD	Pts	W	D	L	GF	GA	GD	W	D	L	GF	GA	GD
10	5	1	4	16	12	+4	16	4	0	1	9	3	+6	1	1	3	7	9	−2

Source: Match reports

==== Results by round ====
Round	1	2	3	4	5	6	7	8	9	10
Stadium	A	A	H	H	A	H	A	H	A	H
Result	L	W	W	W	D	W	L	L	L	W
Position	11	3	2	2	3	1	1	4	7	4

Source: Match reports
A = Away; H = Home; W = Win; D = Draw; L = Loss

==== Matches ====
Win Loss Draw

April 2, 2016 Match 1	Carolina RailHawks	2–1	Minnesota United	Cary, North Carolina
12:00 p.m. CST	Shipalane 13' da Luz 26'; Beckie (yellow card) 40'; Mensing (red card) 88'	Report	Ramirez 3'; Calvano (yellow card) 54'; Banks (yellow card) 83'	Stadium: WakeMed Soccer Park; Attendance: 4,159; Referee: Matthieu Bourdeau

April 10, 2016 Match 2 Flyover Cup	FC Edmonton	0–2	Minnesota United	Edmonton, Alberta
3:00 p.m. CST	Roberts (yellow card) 47'	Report	Speas 16', 55'; Vicentini (yellow card) 32'	Stadium: Clarke Stadium; Attendance: 2,731; Referee: David Barrie

April 16, 2016 Match 3	Minnesota United	3–0	Fort Lauderdale Strikers	Blaine, Minnesota
7:00 p.m. CST	Lowe 40'; Ramirez 45+'; Cruz (yellow card) 48'; Brovsky (yellow card) 66'; Zapata 69' (o.g.)	Report	Moura (red card) 22'; Fernandes (yellow card) 40'	Stadium: National Sports Center; Attendance: 9,050; Referee: Caleb Mendez

April 23, 2016 Match 4	Minnesota United	1–0	New York Cosmos	Blaine, Minnesota
7:00 p.m. CST	Lowe (yellow card) 25' (red card) 53'; Añor (yellow card) 66'; Davis (yellow card) 81'; Ramirez 90', (yellow card) 90+'; Calvano (yellow card) 90+'	Report	Kranjčar (yellow card) 28'; Freeman (yellow card) 90+'	Stadium: National Sports Center; Attendance: 9,078; Referee: Chris Penso

May 8, 2016 Match 5	Ottawa Fury	2–2	Minnesota United	Ottawa, Ontario
1:00 p.m. CST	Brovsky 60' (o.g.); Obasi (yellow card) 74' de Jong 90+1'	Report	Ramirez 13'; Speas 75'; Ndjock (yellow card) 87'; Kallman (yellow card) 90'; Brovsky (yellow card) 90+3'	Stadium: TD Place Stadium; Attendance: 4,317; Referee: Pierre-Luc Lauziere

May 14, 2016 Match 6	Minnesota United	2–0	Jacksonville Armada	Blaine, Minnesota
7:00 p.m. CST	Venegas 16'; Pinho 28'	Report	Perea (yellow card) 74'; Eloundou (yellow card) 82'; Johnson (yellow card) 86'	Stadium: National Sports Center; Attendance: 8,861; Referee: Geoff Gamble

May 21, 2016 Match 7	Indy Eleven	4–2	Minnesota United	Indianapolis, Indiana
6:30 p.m. CST	Zayed 16'; Gordon 49'; Falvey (yellow card) 56'; Braun 75'; Busch (yellow card) 76'; Paterson 90+7'	Report	Cruz (yellow card) 7'; Pinho 54'; Lowe 69'; Davis (yellow card) 90+3' (yellow-red card) 90+6'	Stadium: Michael Carroll Stadium; Attendance: 9,076; Referee: Mathieu Bourdeau

May 28, 2016 Match 8	Minnesota United	0–2	Tampa Bay Rowdies	Blaine, Minnesota
7:00 p.m. CST	Watson (yellow card) 11'; Ibson (yellow card) 59'	Report	Collins (yellow card) 33'; Cole 42'; Avila 47'; Guerra (yellow card) 83'; Mwanga (yellow card) 90+4'	Stadium: National Sports Center; Attendance: 7,915; Referee: Luis Guardia

June 4, 2016 Match 9	Rayo OKC	1–0	Minnesota United	Yukon, Oklahoma
8:00 p.m. CST	Pecka (yellow card) 50'; Gibson 70'	Report	Añor (yellow card) 56'	Stadium: Miller Stadium; Attendance: 4,118; Referee: Rosendo Mendoza

June 11, 2016 Match 10	Minnesota United	2–1	Miami FC	Blaine, Minnesota
7:00 p.m. CST	Ibson (yellow card) 40', (goal) 90+4'; Ramirez 46'; Pinho 52'	Report	Ryan (yellow card) 55'; Martínez (yellow card) 66'; Chavez 66'	Stadium: National Sports Center; Attendance: 9,102; Referee: Alejandro Mariscal

=== NASL Fall Championship ===
Pos	Team	Pld	W	D	L	GF	GA	GD	Pts	Qualification
1	New York Cosmos (F)	22	14	5	3	44	21	+23	47	Playoffs
2	Indy Eleven	22	11	4	7	36	25	+11	37	
3	FC Edmonton	22	10	6	6	16	14	+2	36	
4	Rayo OKC	22	9	8	5	28	21	+7	35	
5	Miami FC	22	9	6	7	31	27	+4	33	
6	Fort Lauderdale Strikers	22	7	5	10	19	28	−9	26	
7	Carolina RailHawks	22	7	5	10	25	35	−10	26	
8	Minnesota United	22	6	7	9	25	25	0	25	
9	Puerto Rico	22	5	9	8	19	31	−12	24	
10	Tampa Bay Rowdies	22	5	8	9	29	32	−3	23	
11	Jacksonville Armada	22	5	8	9	25	35	−10	23	
12	Ottawa Fury	22	5	7	10	23	26	−3	22	

Source: NASL
Rules for classification: 1) points; 2) total goal differential; 3) total goals scored; 4) head-to-head record; 5) away goal differential; 6) away goals scored
(F) Fall season champion

==== Results summary ====
Overall								Home						Away					
Pld	W	D	L	GF	GA	GD	Pts	W	D	L	GF	GA	GD	W	D	L	GF	GA	GD
22	6	7	9	25	25	0	25	6	1	4	19	13	+6	0	6	5	6	12	−6

Source: Match reports

==== Results by round ====
Round	1	2	3	4	5	6	7	8	9	10	11	12	13	14	15	16	17	18	19	20	21	22
Stadium	H	A	H	H	A	H	H	A	H	A	A	A	H	A	H	A	H	A	A	H	A	H
Result	W	L	W	W	D	D	L	L	W	D	D	D	W	L	L	L	L	D	D	W	L	L
Position	1	4	5	3	3	5	6	6	4	4	5	4	4	4	5	6	6	7	7	6	7	8

Source: Match reports
A = Away; H = Home; W = Win; D = Draw; L = Loss

==== Matches ====
Win Loss Draw

July 2, 2016 Match 1	Minnesota United	5–1	Carolina RailHawks	Blaine, Minnesota
7:00 p.m. CST	Ramirez 20', 24', 75'; Pinho 45+1'; Calvano 47'; Brovsky (yellow card) 58' (yellow-red card) 67'; Davis (yellow card) 79'	Report	Beckie (yellow card) 26'; Watson (yellow card) 78', (goal) 90'	Stadium: National Sports Center; Attendance: 7,909; Referee: Younes Marrakchi

July 9, 2016 Match 2	Indy Eleven	1–0	Minnesota United	Indianapolis, Indiana
6:30 p.m. CST	Braun (yellow card) 75'; Mares 78'; Janicki (yellow card) 89'; Palmer (red card) 90+6'	Report	Pitchkolan (yellow card) 29'	Stadium: Michael Carroll Stadium; Attendance: 6,132; Referee: Alex Chilowicz

July 16, 2016 Match 3	Minnesota United	2–0	Indy Eleven	Blaine, Minnesota
7:00 p.m. CST	Ramirez 3' (pen.), 6'; Davis (yellow card) 71'	Report	Zayed (yellow card) 32'	Stadium: National Sports Center; Attendance: 9,460; Referee: Baboucarr Jallow

July 23, 2016 Match 4	Minnesota United	3–1	Fort Lauderdale Strikers	Blaine, Minnesota
7:00 p.m. CST	Lowe (yellow card) 12'; Banks 14'; Ramirez 23'; Jome 70'; Calvano (yellow card) 72'	Report	Fernandes (yellow card) 43' (yellow card) 75' (yellow-red card); Paulo Jr. 54'	Stadium: National Sports Center; Attendance: 8,379; Referee: Mark Kadlecik

July 30, 2016 Match 5	Rayo OKC	2–2	Minnesota United	Yukon, Oklahoma
8:00 p.m. CST	Sandoval 60'; Boateng (yellow card) 61'; Hernandez (yellow card) 83'; Danso 90+3'	Report	Davis 71'; Jome (yellow card) 93'; Ramirez 90+2'	Stadium: Miller Stadium; Attendance: 3,512; Referee: Alex Chilowicz

August 3, 2016 Match 6	Minnesota United	1–1	Puerto Rico FC	Blaine, Minnesota
7:00 p.m. CST	Ibson (yellow card) 27'; Kafari 46' (o.g.)	Report	Ramos 5'; Rudy (yellow card) 8'; Dawson (yellow card) 88'; Rivera (yellow card) 90+4'	Stadium: National Sports Center; Attendance: 6,101; Referee: Guido Gonzales Jr.

August 6, 2016 Match 7	Minnesota United	0–4	Miami FC	Blaine, Minnesota
7:00 p.m. CST	Blake (yellow card) 19'; Brovsky (yellow card) 60'; Kallman (yellow card) 86'	Report	Steele 9', (yellow card) 62'; Martínez 21'; Poku 26'; Farfán (yellow card) 49'; Dennis 87'	Stadium: National Sports Center; Attendance: 9,040; Referee: Mathieu Bourdeau

August 14, 2016 Match 8 Flyover Cup	FC Edmonton	1–0	Minnesota United	Edmonton, Alberta
3:00 p.m. CST	Ledgerwood (yellow card) 38'; Ameobi 46'	Report	Ibson (yellow card) 37'; Calvano (yellow card) 74'; Brovsky (yellow card) 90+3'	Stadium: Clarke Stadium; Attendance: 2,249; Referee: Juan Marquez

August 17, 2016 Match 9	Minnesota United	2–0	Tampa Bay Rowdies	Blaine, Minnesota
7:00 p.m. CST	Speas 18'; Lowe (yellow card) 21'; Ramirez 62'; Blake (red card) 82'; Ndjock (yellow card) 87'	Report	Guerra (yellow card) 14'; PC (yellow card) 63'; Cole (yellow card) 80'	Stadium: National Sports Center; Attendance: 8,207; Referee: Rosendo Mendoza

August 20, 2016 Match 10	Jacksonville Armada	0–0	Minnesota United	Jacksonville, Florida
6:00 p.m. CST	Bahner (yellow card) 82'	Report	Ibson (yellow card) 43' (red card) 77'; Watson (yellow card) 43'	Stadium: Baseball Grounds of Jacksonville; Attendance: 2,516; Referee: Jaime Herrera

August 27, 2016 Match 11	Miami FC	1–1	Minnesota United	Miami
7:00 p.m. CST	Martínez (yellow card) 47'; Poku 51'; Borrajo (yellow card) 86'	Report	Laing (yellow card) 38', (goal) 58'	Stadium: FIU Stadium; Attendance: 9,739; Referee: Luis Guardia

August 31, 2016 Match 12	Fort Lauderdale Strikers	0–0	Minnesota United	Fort Lauderdale, Florida
6:30 p.m. CST	Attakora (yellow card) 15'; Gonzalez (yellow card) 69'	Report	Laing (yellow card) 62'	Stadium: Lockhart Stadium; Attendance: 455; Referee: Nima Saghafi

September 3, 2016 Match 13	Minnesota United	1–0	Rayo OKC	Blaine, Minnesota
7:00 p.m. CST	Ramirez 44'; Lowe (yellow card) 76'; Pitchkolan (yellow card) 90+4'	Report	Ibeagha (yellow card) 20'; Yuma (yellow card) 78'; Michel (red card) 88'	Stadium: National Sports Center; Attendance: 8,601; Referee: Daniel Radford

September 10, 2016 Match 14	New York Cosmos	1–0	Minnesota United	Hempstead, New York
6:00 p.m. CST	Rovérsio (yellow card) 30'; Diosa 32'; Mkosana (yellow card) 80'; Flores (yellow card) 90+3'	Report	Lowe (yellow card) 39'	Stadium: James M Shuart Stadium; Attendance: 3,318; Referee: Alejandro Mariscal

September 17, 2016 Match 15	Minnesota United	2–3	Ottawa Fury	Blaine, Minnesota
7:00 p.m. CST	Calvano (yellow card) 9'; Watson 30'; Ramirez 44' (pen.); Brovsky (yellow card) 52'; Venegas (yellow card) 90+1'	Report	Gentile 35'; Williams 84'; Mwanga 88'	Stadium: National Sports Center; Attendance: 9,388; Referee: David Gantar

September 24, 2016 Match 16	Ottawa Fury	3–1	Minnesota United	Ottawa, Ontario
6:00 p.m. CST	Edward (yellow card) 45+2'; Gentile 56'; Williams 82'; Rozeboom 86'	Report	Watson 20', (yellow card) 57'; Speas (yellow card) 51'	Stadium: TD Place Stadium; Attendance: 6,274; Referee: Yusri Rudolf

October 1, 2016 Match 17	Minnesota United	0–1	Jacksonville Armada	Blaine, Minnesota
7:00 p.m. CST	Pitchkolan (yellow card) 85'	Report	Barrow (yellow card) 48'; Eloundou (yellow card) 56'; Bahner 88'	Stadium: National Sports Center; Attendance: 9,402; Referee: Fotis Bazakos

October 5, 2016 Match 18	Tampa Bay Rowdies	2–2	Minnesota United	St. Petersburg, Florida
6:30 p.m. CST	Hristov 31', (yellow card) 55'; Savage (yellow card) 73', (goal) 90+3'	Report	Ramirez 17'; Banks 51'; Klute (yellow card) 82'; Davis (yellow card) 88'	Stadium: Al Lang Stadium; Attendance: 4,804; Referee: Rubiel Vazquez

October 8, 2016 Match 19	Puerto Rico FC	0–0	Minnesota United	Bayamón, Puerto Rico
6:30 p.m. CST		Report	Lowe (yellow card) 73'; Cruz (yellow card) 82'	Stadium: Juan Ramón Loubriel Stadium; Attendance: 4,347; Referee: Adrian Skeete

October 15, 2016 Match 20; Flyover Cup	Minnesota United	3–1	FC Edmonton	Blaine, Minnesota
7:00 p.m. CST	Ramirez 23', 53'; Ibson (yellow card) 84'; Pinho 84'	Report	Watson 16'; Diakité (yellow card) 51'; Fordyce (yellow card) 58'	Stadium: National Sports Center; Attendance: 8.059; Referee: Alejandro Mariscal

October 22, 2016 Match 21	Carolina RailHawks	1–0	Minnesota United	Cary, North Carolina
6:30 p.m. CST	Fondy 51'; Albadawi (yellow card) 59'; Moses (yellow card) 77'	Report	Pitchkolan (yellow card) 67'	Stadium: WakeMed Soccer Park; Attendance: 8.086; Referee: Marcos De Oliveira

October 29, 2016 Match 22	Minnesota United	0–1	New York Cosmos	Blaine, Minnesota
7:00 p.m. CST	Cruz (yellow card) 38'; Lowe (yellow card) 61'; Davis (yellow card) 71'	Report	Mulligan (yellow card) 45'; Calvillo 49'; Orozco (yellow card) 62'; Diosa (yellow card) 90+3'	Stadium: National Sports Center; Attendance: 8,609; Referee: Allen Chapman

=== NASL Playoffs ===
Pos	Team	Pld	W	D	L	GF	GA	GD	Pts	Qualification
1	New York Cosmos (C, X)	32	20	5	7	59	29	+30	65	Championship qualifiers
2	Indy Eleven	32	15	10	7	51	33	+18	55	Championship qualifiers
3	FC Edmonton	32	15	8	9	25	21	+4	53	Championship qualifiers
4	Rayo OKC	32	12	11	9	39	33	+6	47	Championship qualifiers
5	Minnesota United	32	11	8	13	41	37	+4	41	
6	Fort Lauderdale Strikers	32	11	8	13	31	40	−9	41	
7	Miami FC	32	10	10	12	38	42	−4	40	
8	Carolina RailHawks	32	11	7	14	36	48	−12	40	
9	Tampa Bay Rowdies	32	9	12	11	40	41	−1	39	
10	Ottawa Fury	32	7	10	15	32	40	−8	31	
11	Jacksonville Armada	32	6	12	14	30	46	−16	30	
12	Puerto Rico FC	22	5	9	8	19	31	−12	24	

Source: NASL
Rules for classification: 1) points; 2) total goal differential; 3) total goals scored; 4) head-to-head record; 5) away goal differential; 6) away goals scored
(C) Champions; (X) Regular season champion

=== U.S. Open Cup ===
Win Loss

June 1, 2016 Third round	Saint Louis FC (Missouri)	0–2	Minnesota United FC	St. Louis, Missouri
7:00 PM CDT	Cochran (yellow card) 45+1'	Report	Lowe (yellow card) 56'; Venegas 69'; Blake 90+3'	Stadium: World Wide Technology Soccer Park

June 15, 2016 Fourth round	Minnesota United FC	1–2 (a.e.t.)	Sporting Kansas City	Blaine, Minnesota
7:00 PM CDT	Ndjock (yellow card) 55'; Lowe (yellow card) 56'; Vicentini (yellow card) 57'; Cruz (yellow card) 68'; Speas (yellow card) 72'; Ramirez 81' (pen.); Kallman (yellow card) 117'; Davis (yellow card) 120+2'	Report	Opara (yellow card) 51'; Espinoza (yellow card) 55'; Feilhaber 65'; Abdul-Salaam (yellow card) 69'; Olum (yellow card) 75'; Rubio 109'	Stadium: National Sports Center; Attendance: 7,689; Referee: Nima Saghafi

== Squad statistics ==
=== Appearances ===
Numbers in parentheses denote appearances as substitute.
Players with no appearances not included in the list.

As of match played October 30, 2016

No.	Pos.	Player	NASL Spring Season	NASL Fall Season	U.S. Open Cup	Total
No.	Pos.	Player	Apps	Apps	Apps	Apps
2	DF	(United States) Justin Davis	9	22	2	33
3	DF	(United States) Jeb Brovsky	8	18	1	27
4	MF	(United States) Aaron Pitchkolan	0 (3)	13 (3)	1	14 (6)
5	DF	(Brazil) Tiago Calvano	4 (1)	9 (1)	1	13 (2)
6	DF	(United States) Brent Kallman	9	20 (1)	1	30 (1)
7	MF	(Brazil) Ibson	3 (2)	14 (4)	1 (1)	18 (7)
8	FW	(United States) Danny Cruz	9	12 (1)	3 (1)	24 (2)
9	FW	(Venezuela) Bernardo Añor	4 (3)	0 (2)	0	4 (5)
10	FW	(United States) Ben Speas	7 (1)	10 (8)	0 (1)	17 (10)
11	FW	(Brazil) Stefano Pinho	5 (4)	8 (8)	2	15 (12)
12	GK	(Haiti) Steward Ceus	0	4	0	4
13	MF	(United States) Jamie Watson	1	9 (3)	0	10 (3)
14	MF	(Scotland) Jack Blake	2	5 (4)	1	8 (4)
15	FW	(The Gambia) Ismaila Jome	0	5 (4)	0	5 (4)
17	MF	(Jamaica) Lance Laing	5 (3)	7 (4)	0	12 (7)
18	FW	(Brazil) Daniel Mendes	0 (3)	0 (2)	1	1 (5)
21	FW	(United States) Christian Ramirez	9 (1)	21	2	32 (1)
22	DF	(United States) Kevin Venegas	10	11 (2)	2	23 (2)
23	MF	(United States) Greg Jordan	1	0	0	1
29	FW	(United States) J. C. Banks	0 (5)	13 (7)	1 (1)	14 (13)
31	DF	(Jamaica) Damion Lowe	8 (1)	17 (1)	2	27 (2)
33	GK	(Cameroon) Sammy Ndjock	10	18	2	30
37	DF	(United States) Chris Klute	0	0 (2)	0	0 (2)
77	MF	(Brazil) Juliano Vicentini	6 (2)	4 (4)	1	11 (6)

=== Goalscorers ===
Includes all competitive matches.

As of match played October 30, 2016

Rank	Pos.	No.	Player	NASL Spring Season	NASL Fall Season	U.S. Open Cup	Total
1	FW	21	(United States) Christian Ramirez	5	13	1	19
2	MF	11	(Brazil) Stefano Pinho	3	2	0	5
3	FW	10	(United States) Ben Speas	3	1	0	4
4	MF	13	(United States) Jamie Watson	0	2	0	2
4	MF	22	(United States) Kevin Venegas	1	0	1	2
4	FW	29	(United States) J. C. Banks	0	2	0	2
4	MF	31	(Jamaica) Damion Lowe	2	0	0	2
8	DF	2	(United States) Justin Davis	0	1	0	1
8	DF	5	(Brazil) Tiago Calvano	0	1	0	1
8	MF	7	(Brazil) Ibson	1	0	0	1
8	MF	14	(Scotland) Jack Blake	0	0	1	1
8	FW	15	(The Gambia) Ismaila Jome	0	1	0	1
8	MF	17	(Jamaica) Lance Laing	0	1	0	1
#	Own Goal			1	1	0	2
TOTALS				16	25	3	44

=== Disciplinary record ===
As of match played October 30, 2016

No.	Pos.	Player	NASL Spring Season		NASL Fall Season		U.S. Open Cup		Total	
No.	Pos.	Player	Booked	Sent off (straight red)	Booked	Sent off (straight red)	Booked	Sent off (straight red)	Booked	Sent off (straight red)
31	DF	(Jamaica) Damion Lowe	1	1	6	0	2	0	9	1
2	DF	(United States) Justin Davis	2	1	4	0	1	0	7	1
3	DF	(United States) Jeb Brovsky	2	0	5	1	0	0	7	1
7	MF	(Brazil) Ibson	2	0	4	1	0	0	6	1
5	DF	(Brazil) Tiago Calvano	2	0	3	1	0	0	5	1
8	FW	(United States) Danny Cruz	2	0	2	0	1	0	5	0
4	MF	(United States) Aaron Pitchkolan	0	0	4	0	0	0	4	0
6	DF	(United States) Brent Kallman	1	0	1	0	1	0	3	0
13	MF	(United States) Jamie Watson	1	0	2	0	0	0	3	0
33	GK	(Cameroon) Sammy Ndjock	1	0	1	0	1	0	3	0
9	FW	(Venezuela) Bernardo Añor	2	0	0	0	0	0	2	0
10	FW	(United States) Ben Speas	0	0	1	0	1	0	2	0
17	MF	(Jamaica) Lance Laing	0	0	2	0	0	0	2	0
77	MF	(Brazil) Juliano Vicentini	1	0	0	0	1	0	2	0
14	MF	(Scotland) Jack Blake	0	0	1	1	0	0	1	1
15	FW	(The Gambia) Ismaila Jome	0	0	1	0	0	0	1	0
21	FW	(United States) Christian Ramirez	1	0	0	0	0	0	1	0
22	DF	(United States) Kevin Venegas	0	0	1	0	0	0	1	0
29	FW	(United States) J. C. Banks	1	0	0	0	0	0	1	0
37	DF	(United States) Chris Klute	0	0	1	0	0	0	1	0

== See also ==
- Minnesota United FC
- 2016 North American Soccer League season
- 2016 in American soccer
