= 2018 Charlotte Independence season =

Charlotte Independence
2018 season
- President: Jim McPhilliamy
- Head coach: Mike Jeffries
- Stadium: Sportsplex at Matthews
- U.S. Open Cup: Second round
- Highest home attendance: 3,312 (June 26 vs. Charleston)
- Lowest home attendance: 982 (August 8 vs. Bethlehem)
- Average home league attendance: 1,756
Home colors	Away colors

The 2018 Charlotte Independence season was the club's fourth season of existence, and their fourth in the United Soccer League, the second tier of American soccer.

== Background ==
The Independence finished the 2017 season with a record of 13–9–10, finished 5th in the Eastern Conference, and 11th overall. In the 2017 USL Playoffs, Charlotte were bested in the first round by the Rochester Rhinos. Elsewhere, the Independence reached the third round of the 2017 U.S. Open Cup, losing 1–4 to NASL outfit, North Carolina FC.

== Club ==
=== Roster ===
No.	Position	Nation	Player
1	GK	USA	Brandon Miller
3	DF	USA	Bilal Duckett
4	MF	USA	Jake Areman
6	MF	USA	Greg Jordan
7	MF	FRA	Yann Ekra
8	DF	SUI	Kay Voser
9	FW	LBY	Éamon Zayed
10	MF	COL	Jorge Herrera
11	MF	ZAM	Mutaya Mwape
12	GK	USA	Kainoa Likewise
13	MF	TRI	Kevan George
14	DF	KOR	Lee Jung-soo
15	DF	CMR	Calvin Doum
16	DF	CMR	Bertrand Owundi (on loan from Minnesota United FC)
17	FW	TRI	Cordell Cato
18	GK	USA	Ben Beaury
20	MF	MEX	Ricardo Perez
22	DF	LBR	Joel Johnson
23	MF	URU	Alex Martínez
25	DF	UGA	Henry Kalungi
27	MF	JAM	Je-Vaughn Watson
29	FW	USA	Caleb Calvert
31	DF	USA	Sam Vines
33	DF	USA	Donnie Smith

Signed to first team contract with MLS affiliate Colorado Rapids.

== Competitions ==
=== Friendlies ===
All times in regular season on Eastern Daylight Time (UTC-04:00)

Win Draw Loss Upcoming fixture

February 14 Preseason	Atlanta United FC	–	Charlotte Independence	Marietta, Georgia
EST (UTC–5)				Stadium: Children's Healthcare of Atlanta Training Ground
Note: Closed door; match not publicized.

February 17 Preseason	Charlotte Independence	5–3	Columbus Crew SC	Charleston, South Carolina
EST (UTC–5)	Duckett; Martínez (pen.); Trialist; Steedman; Trialist
Note: Closed door

February 25 Preseason	Charlotte Independence	0–1	North Carolina FC	Matthews, North Carolina
13:00 EST (UTC–5)			Miller	Stadium: Sportsplex at Matthews

March 3 Preseason	Atlanta United 2	2–4	Charlotte Independence	Marietta, Georgia
EST (UTC–5)			Trialist; Herrera (o.g.); Doum	Stadium: Children's Healthcare of Atlanta Training Ground

March 10 Preseason	Charlotte Independence	2–1	Old Dominion Monarchs	Matthews, North Carolina
EST (UTC–5)			Kronschwitz	Stadium: Sportsplex at Matthews

September 5 Midseason	Charlotte Independence (United States)	0–3	(Mexico) Santos Laguna	Matthews, North Carolina
19:30 EST (UTC–5)		Report	Martínez 60'; Rivas; Cetré	Stadium: Sportsplex at Matthews

=== USL Regular season ===
==== Standings ====
Pos	Team	Pld	W	D	L	GF	GA	GD	Pts
9	North Carolina FC	34	13	8	13	60	50	+10	47
10	Ottawa Fury	34	13	6	15	31	43	−12	45
11	Charlotte Independence	34	10	12	12	44	57	−13	42
12	Tampa Bay Rowdies	34	11	8	15	44	44	0	41
13	Penn FC	34	9	10	15	38	47	−9	37

Source: 2018 USL standings
Rules for classification: 1) total wins; 2) total goal differential; 3) total goals scored; 4) points earned against top four Conference finishers; 5) disciplinary points; 6) coin toss or drawing of lots

==== Results summary ====
Overall								Home						Away					
Pld	W	D	L	GF	GA	GD	Pts	W	D	L	GF	GA	GD	W	D	L	GF	GA	GD
30	9	10	11	37	49	−12	37	7	6	3	23	19	+4	2	4	8	14	30	−16

Last updated: 25 September 2018.
Source: Matches

Round	1	2	3	4	5	6	7	8	9	10	11	12	13	14	15	16	17	18	19	20	21	22	23	24	25	26	27	28	29	30	31	32	33	34
Stadium	H	H	H	A	H	H	A	H	A	A	A	A	A	H	A	H	A	A	H	A	A	H	H	A	H	A	H	H	A	H	H	A	A	H
Result	W	W	D	L	L	D	L	W	W	W	W	L	D	D	D	D	L	L	W	L	L	D	L	D	L	L	W	W	D	D	D	D	W	L

Updated to match(es) played on 14 October 2018. Source: Matches
A = Away; H = Home; W = Win; D = Draw; L = Loss; P = Postponed

==== Matches ====
All times in regular season on Eastern Daylight Time (UTC-04:00)

Win Draw Loss Upcoming fixture

March 17 1	Charlotte Independence	4–1	Ottawa Fury FC	Matthews, North Carolina
19:00 EST (UTC–5)	Cato 41', 58'; George (yellow card) 45'; Herrera (yellow card) 67', (goal) 80' (pen.); Porter 83' (o.g.)	Report	Sito 64'; Oliveira (yellow card) 90+3'	Stadium: Sportsplex at Matthews; Attendance: 1,438; Referee: Jonathan Bilinski

March 24 2	Charlotte Independence	2–0	Toronto FC II	Matthews, North Carolina
7:00 PM EDT	Herrera 18'; Calvert 42'; Johnson (yellow card) 70'	Report	Spencer (yellow card) 22'	Stadium: Sportsplex at Matthews; Attendance: 1,026; Referee: Javier Santos

March 31 3	Charlotte Independence	2–2	Atlanta United 2	Matthews, North Carolina
7:00 PM EDT	Martínez (yellow card) 32'; Herrera 37', 85'; George (yellow card) 61'	Report	Jung-soo 28' (o.g.); Kunga 82'	Stadium: Sportsplex at Matthews; Attendance: 1,375; Referee: Daniel Gutierrez

April 7 4	Nashville SC	2–0	Charlotte Independence	Nashville, Tennessee
8:30PM EDT	Winn 24'; Mensah 90+1'	Report	Duckett (yellow card) 12'; Johnson (yellow card) 89'	Stadium: First Tennessee Park; Attendance: 7,487; Referee: Elvis Osmanovic

April 14 5	Charlotte Independence	0–2	North Carolina FC	Matthews, North Carolina
7:00 PM EDT	Martínez (yellow card) 7'; Smith (yellow card) 85'	Report	Ríos 50'; Doue (yellow card) 59'; Fortune (yellow card) 61'; Lomis 86'	Stadium: Sportsplex at Matthews; Attendance: 2,264; Referee: Matthew Franz

April 28 6	Charlotte Independence	0–0	Indy Eleven	Matthews, North Carolina
7:00 PM EDT				Stadium: Sportsplex at Matthews

May 5 7	Charleston Battery	2–0	Charlotte Independence	Charleston, South Carolina
7:00 EDT				Stadium: MUSC Health Stadium

May 12 8	Charlotte Independence	4–1	FC Cincinnati	Matthews, North Carolina
7:30 EDT	Cato 38'; Ekra 45+2'; Voser 57'; Zayed 87'	Report	König 52'	Stadium: Sportsplex at Matthews; Attendance: 2,314; Referee: Kevin Broadley

May 19 9	Charlotte Independence	2–1	Toronto FC II	Matthews, North Carolina
7:30 EDT				Stadium: Sportsplex at Matthews; Attendance: 987
Note: Originally scheduled to be played at BMO Field in Toronto, Ontario.

May 26 10	Richmond Kickers	1–3	Charlotte Independence	Richmond, Virginia
7:00 EDT				Stadium: City Stadium

June 2 11	Ottawa Fury FC	0–1	Charlotte Independence	Ottawa, Ontario
7:00 EDT	Reid (yellow card) 55'; Edward (yellow card) 90'	Report	Ekra 83'	Stadium: TD Place Stadium; Attendance: 5,693; Referee: Carol Anne Chenard

June 9 12	New York Red Bulls II	4–2	Charlotte Independence	Montclair, New Jersey
7:00 EDT				Stadium: MSU Soccer Park

May 26 13	Atlanta United 2	1–1	Charlotte Independence	Richmond, Virginia
7:00 EDT				Stadium: City Stadium

June 16 14	Charlotte Independence	1–1	Charleston Battery	Matthews, North Carolina
7:30 EDT	Mwape 79'	Report	25' Higashi	Stadium: Matthews Sportsplex; Attendance: 3,312; Referee: Rubiel Vazquez

June 23 15	Richmond Kickers	1–1	Charlotte Independence	Richmond, Virginia
7:00 PM EDT	Shriver 6'	Report	Cato 20'; George (yellow card) 63'	Stadium: City Stadium; Attendance: 5,364; Referee: Javier Santos Escobar
Note: Leigh Cowlishaw's final match as manager.

June 27 16	Charlotte Independence	2–2	Tampa Bay Rowdies	Matthews, North Carolina
7:30 EDT (UTC−4)	Herrera 57' (Cato); Cato 64' (Herrera); Johnson (yellow card) 86' (yellow-red card) 89'; Smith (red card) 90+2'	Report	Gorskie (yellow card) 44'; Mkandawire 66'; Lachowecki (yellow card) 78'; Oduro 90'	Stadium: Sportsplex at Matthews; Attendance: 1,399; Referee: Marcos de Oliveira

June 30 17	Bethlehem Steel FC	4–1	Charlotte Independence	Bethlehem, Pennsylvania
5:00 PM EDT	Nanco 10'; Moar 46'; Skundrich 72'; Herbers 80'; Mbaizo (yellow card) 90+2'	Report	(yellow card) 11' Kalungi; (yellow card) 69' Watson; (yellow card) 83' Areman; 90+3' Herrera	Stadium: Goodman Stadium; Attendance: 2,346; Referee: Matthew Franz

July 7 18	Indy Eleven	2–1	Charlotte Independence	Indianapolis, Indiana
7:00 PM EDT	Speas 62'; Mitchell 70'	Report	Duckett (yellow card) 49' (yellow-red card) 77'; Herrera 50', (yellow card) 55'; Areman (yellow card) 90+2'; Martínez (yellow card) 90+3'	Stadium: Lucas Oil Stadium; Attendance: 9,858; Referee: Lukasz Szpala

July 11 19	Charlotte Independence	1–0	Nashville SC	Matthews, North Carolina
7:30PM EDT	Johnson (yellow card) 15'; George 42'; Calvert (red card) 90+4'	Report	(yellow card) 46' Akinyode; (yellow card) 74'Winn; (yellow card) 90+5' Pickens; (yellow card) 90+5' Woodberry	Stadium: Sportsplex at Matthews; Attendance: 1,247; Referee: Kevin Broadley

July 18 20	FC Cincinnati	2–0	Charlotte Independence	Cincinnati, Ohio
7:30 EDT	Keinan 7'; Lasso 20'; Ledesma (yellow card) 67'; Welshman (yellow card) 87'	Report	Duckett (yellow card) 28'; Zayed (yellow card) 65'; Voser (yellow card) 87'	Stadium: Nippert Stadium; Attendance: 25,251; Referee: Jon Freemon

July 21 21	Louisville City FC	4–1	Charlotte Independence	Louisville, Kentucky
7:30PM	McCabe 21'; Ilić 72' (pen.); Lancaster 81'; Davis IV 87'	Report	George (yellow card) 71'; Herrera 90'	Stadium: Louisville Slugger Field; Attendance: 8,006; Referee: Lorant Varga

July 28 22	Charlotte Independence	1–1	Penn FC	Matthews, North Carolina
7:30 EDT	Areman (yellow card) 47'; Herrera 56'; Zayed 64'; Duckett (yellow card) 90+1'	Report	(yellow card) 62' Metzger; 72' Dennis; (yellow card) 90+5' Rezende	Stadium: Matthews Sportsplex; Attendance: 2,159; Referee: Jonathan Bilinski

August 8 23	Charlotte Independence	0–3	Bethlehem Steel FC	Matthews, North Carolina
7:30 EDT	George (yellow card) 35'	Report	7' Chambers; (yellow card) 65' Real; 74' Holness; 89' (yellow card) 90' Skundrich	Stadium: Matthews Sportsplex; Attendance: 982; Referee: Amin Hadzic

August 18 24	Pittsburgh Riverhounds SC	0–0	Charlotte Independence	Pittsburgh, Pennsylvania
7:00 EDT		Report	Jordan (yellow card) 10', (yellow card) 58' (red card)	Stadium: Highmark Stadium; Attendance: 2,765; Referee: Elvis Osmanovic

August 22 25	Charlotte Independence	0–3	Louisville City	Matthews, North Carolina
7:30 PM EDT	Mwape (yellow card) 90'	Report	Lancaster 13' (pen.), 29', (yellow card) 42'; Spencer 65'	Stadium: Matthews Sportsplex; Attendance: 2,189; Referee: Rubiel Vazquez

August 25 26	North Carolina FC	6–2	Charlotte Independence	Cary, North Carolina
19:00 EDT	Steinberger 26', 51' (yellow card) 52'; Fernandes (yellow card) 36'; Miller (yellow card) 36' (goal) 49' da Luz 69'; Ríos 72', 78'	Report	George 24' (yellow card) 32'; Owundi (yellow card) 72'; Areman 85'	Stadium: Sahlen's Stadium at WakeMed Soccer Park; Attendance: 4,195; Referee: Daniel Gutierrez

September 1 27	Charlotte Independence	1–0	Nashville SC	Matthews, North Carolina
6:30PM CDT	Watson 25'; George (yellow card) 53', (yellow card) 86' (red card); Jung-soo (yellow card) 81'	Report	Winn (yellow card) 45'; Moloto (yellow card) 53'; Woodberry (yellow card) 67'	Stadium: Sportsplex at Matthews

September 8 28	Charlotte Independence	2–1	Richmond Kickers	Matthews, North Carolina
19:00 EDT	Zayed 5'; Areman 58'	Report	Gonzalez 72'; Nascimento (yellow card) 83'	Stadium: Sportsplex at Matthews; Attendance: 1,175; Referee: Greg Dopka

September 19 29	Charleston Battery	1–1	Charlotte Independence	Charleston, South Carolina
7:00 P.M.	Rittmeyer 9'; Woodbine (yellow card) 80'; Mansaray (yellow card) 90+1'	Report	Herrera 69' (pen.); Martínez (yellow card) 89'	Stadium: MUSC Health Stadium; Referee: Joseph Dickerson

September 22 30	Charlotte Independence	1–1	New York Red Bulls II	Matthews, North Carolina
7:00 PM	Jordan 15'; Johnson (yellow card) 33'	Report	Aguinaga (yellow card) 54'; Cásseres (yellow card) 62'; Abang 70'; Ndam (yellow card) 90+2'	Stadium: Sportsplex at Matthews; Attendance: 1,608; Referee: Eric Tattersall

September 29 31	Charlotte Independence	2–2	Pittsburgh Riverhounds SC	Matthews, North Carolina
7:00 PM EDT	Herrera 19'; Johnson (yellow card) 46'; Watson (yellow card) 77'; Zayed 86'; Duckett (yellow card) 90+2'	Report	Parkes 4', (yellow card) 44'; Zemanski (yellow card) 90+3', (goal) 90+4'	Stadium: Sportsplex at Matthews; Attendance: 1,878; Referee: Mark Allatin

October 3 32	Penn FC	2–2	Charlotte Independence	Harrisburg, Pennsylvania
6:30 PM EDT	Venter 36'; Mkosana 44'; Calvano (yellow card) 74'; Baffoe (yellow card) 90'	Report	Zayed 17', 28'; Johnson (yellow card) 87'; Kiffe (yellow card) 90'	Stadium: FNB Field; Attendance: 2,013; Referee: Guido Gonzales, Jr.

October 6 33	Tampa Bay Rowdies	1–2	Charlotte Independence	St. Petersburg, Florida
19:30 EDT (UTC−4)	Gorskie (yellow card) 75'; Taylor 80' (Guenzatti); Vega (red card) 90+7'	Report	Voser 26' (Zayed), (yellow card) 84'; Gebhard 32' (Cato); Miller (yellow card) 82'	Stadium: Al Lang Stadium; Attendance: 7,709; Referee: Luis Guardia

October 13 34	Charlotte Independence	1–3	North Carolina FC	Matthews, North Carolina
19:00 EDT	Herrera 6', (yellow card) 7'	Report	Ríos 5', 87'; Smith (yellow card) 30'; Igbekoyi (yellow card) 73'; Miller 90+3'	Stadium: Sportsplex at Matthews; Attendance: 1,486; Referee: RefereeRamy Touchan

=== U.S. Open Cup ===
May 16 Second round	Charlotte Independence (North Carolina)	1–3	(New Jersey) Ocean City Nor'easters	Matthews, North Carolina
7:30 EDT	Herrera 58'; Martínez (yellow card) 84'	Report	Gurrieri 4', 6'; Ndah (yellow card) 23'; Mompremier 44', (yellow card) 67'	Stadium: Sportsplex at Matthews; Attendance: 300; Referee: Eric Usher
