= Greg Jordan =

American soccer player

Personal information
- Full name: Gregory Jordan
- Date of birth: April 5, 1990 (age 36)
- Place of birth: Naperville, Illinois, United States
- Height: 6 ft 0 in (1.83 m)
- Position: Midfielder

Youth career
- 2008–2011: Creighton Bluejays

Senior career*
Years	Team	Apps	(Gls)
2012–2013	Philadelphia Union	0	(0)
2012	→ Harrisburg City Islanders (loan)	8	(0)
2013	→ Harrisburg City Islanders (loan)	10	(0)
2014–2016	Minnesota United	48	(1)
2017	San Francisco Deltas	21	(0)
2018	Charlotte Independence	16	(1)
- * Club domestic league appearances and goals as of 09:43, 15 October 2018 (UTC)

Gregory Jordan (born April 5, 1990, in Naperville, Illinois) is an American former soccer player.

== Career ==
=== College ===
Jordan played college soccer at Creighton University between 2008 and 2011. During his time at Creighton, Jordan was named NSCAA All-American Second Team in 2011 as a senior, as well as the All-Missouri Valley Conference First Team as both a junior and senior.

=== Professional ===
Jordan was drafted in the second round (32nd overall) of the 2012 MLS SuperDraft by Philadelphia Union.

Jordan was loaned to USL Pro club Harrisburg City Islanders in June 2012.

The Union declined to renew Jordan's contract at the end of their 2013 season. He joined Minnesota United FC of the North American Soccer League ahead of the 2014 season.

Jordan joined the San Francisco Deltas ahead of the 2017 season. The San Francisco Deltas went on to win the 2017 NASL Championship where Jordan played all 90 minutes of the 2–0 win against the New York Cosmos.

Jordan signed with USL side Charlotte Independence for the 2018 season on February 28, 2018. Jordan left Charlotte at the end of their 2018 season.

Jordan is currently a girls soccer coach with the Gretna Elite Academy soccer club in Gretna, NE (a suburb of Omaha). Jordan coached the 2008G ECNL team which has won back-to-back Nebraska State Cup Championships (2021, 2022).

== Career statistics ==
=== Club ===
As of October 13, 2018

Club	Season	League			Cup		Continental		Other		Total	
Club	Season	League	Apps	Goals	Apps	Goals	Apps	Goals	Apps	Goals	Apps	Goals
Philadelphia Union	2012	Major League Soccer	0	0	0	0	0	0	0	0	0	0
Philadelphia Union	2013	Major League Soccer	0	0	0	0	0	0	0	0	0	0
Philadelphia Union	Totals		0	0	0	0	0	0	0	0	0	0
Harrisburg City Islanders (loan)	2012	USL Pro	8	0	0	0	0	0	1	0	9	0
Harrisburg City Islanders (loan)	2013	USL Pro	10	0	0	0	0	0	1	0	11	0
Harrisburg City Islanders (loan)	Totals		18	0	0	0	0	0	2	0	20	0
Minnesota United	2014	North American Soccer League	23	0	0	0	0	0	1	0	23	0
Minnesota United	2015	North American Soccer League	24	0	1	0	0	0	1	0	25	0
Minnesota United	2016	North American Soccer League	1	0	0	0	0	0	0	0	1	0
Minnesota United	Totals		49	0	1	0	0	0	2	0	49	0
San Francisco Deltas	2017	North American Soccer League	21	0	1	0	0	0	0	0	21	0
San Francisco Deltas	Totals		21	0	1	0	0	0	0	0	21	0
Charlotte Independence	2018	United Soccer League	16	1	0	0	0	0	0	0	16	1
Charlotte Independence	Totals		16	1	0	0	0	0	0	0	16	1
Career totals			104	1	2	0	0	0	4	0	104	1
