= Juliano Vicentini =

Brazilian footballer

Personal information
- Full name: Juliano Elizeu Vicentini
- Date of birth: 26 August 1981 (age 45)
- Place of birth: São José do Rio Preto, Brazil
- Height: 1.79 m (5 ft 10 1/2 in)
- Position: Midfielder

Senior career*
Years	Team	Apps	(Gls)
1998–2002	Palmeiras	21	(2)
2001	→ Coritiba (loan)	24	(3)
2003	Náutico	?	(?)
2004	Flamengo	17	(1)
2005	Juventude	26	(3)
2006	Guarani	?	(?)
2006–2007	Lecce	35	(1)
2007–2008	Pisa	20	(2)
2008	Marítimo	2	(0)
2009	Joinville	0	(0)
2009–2010	Novara	23	(0)
2012	América	3	(0)
2013	Audax	4	(0)
2014–2016	Minnesota United	62	(3)
- * Club domestic league appearances and goals as of 15 October 2016

Juliano Elizeu Vicentini (born 26 August 1981) is a Brazilian footballer.

Juliano Vicentini also played 88 matches at Campeonato Brasileiro Série A.

== Career ==
Vicentini started his career at Palmeiras of São Paulo. He signed a 1-year contract with Juventude in January 2005.

In 2006 season he left for Guarani. On 31 August 2006, he signed for Lecce of Serie B. In the next season, he left for Pisa. He then left for Marítimo of Portuguese Liga. After just played 2 league matches, he signed a 3-month contract with Joinville for Campeonato Catarinense 2009.

In August 2009, he left for Novara.
