= Brian Kallman =

American retired soccer player (born 1984)

Brian Kallman.
Personal information
- Full name: Brian Kallman
- Date of birth: April 23, 1984 (age 42)
- Place of birth: Omaha, Nebraska, United States
- Height: 5 ft 11 in (1.80 m)
- Position: Defender

College career
Years	Team	Apps	(Gls)
2002–2004	Jacksonville Dolphins		
2005	Creighton Bluejays		

Senior career*
Years	Team	Apps	(Gls)
2006–2009	Minnesota Thunder	48	(15)
2010–2015	Minnesota United FC	72	(2)
2016–2017	Minneapolis City SC		

Managerial career
- 2019–: Saint Thomas Cadets
- * Club domestic league appearances and goals as of July 16, 2020

Brian Kallman (born April 23, 1984) is an American retired soccer player who played for Minnesota United FC in the North American Soccer League. He announced his retirement from professional soccer in January 2016.

== Career ==
=== Youth and collegiate ===
Kallman attended and lettered three years at Woodbury Senior High School and played three years of college soccer at Jacksonville University, before transferring to Creighton University for his senior season. He was his team's captain at Jacksonville, while at Creighton he was named to the Diadora Challenge All Tournament Team and Portland Invitational All Tournament Team. In Kallman's one campaign at Creighton he started 17 of the 23 matches he played in, helping to anchor a stingy Bluejay defense. The 2005 Bluejay squad posted 10 shutouts and ranked 23rd in the NCAA with a 0.80 goals against average and finished 15-5-3 while advancing to the NCAA Tournament quarterfinals.

=== Professional ===
Kallman turned professional in 2006 when he signed with the Minnesota Thunder of the USL First Division. He played for the Minnesota Thunder in 2006, 2008, and 2009. He made 50 appearances for the Thunder. He has since gone on to play over 50 games and score one goal during his four years with the Thunder. On February 25, 2010, the NSC Minnesota Stars of the USSF Division 2 signed him. He re-signed with the club, which now plays in the North American Soccer League, on March 22, 2011.

He played for the Minnesota Stars in 2010, 2011, and 2012. Kallman made 74 appearances for the Stars, scoring one goal and notching five assists. In 2011, Kallman split some starts with several other veteran defenders for Minnesota before winning the starting role and helping the team to make their playoff push. He played every minute in the playoffs where Minnesota Stars FC won the club's first NASL Soccer Bowl Championship. In 2012, Kallman was a key part of the Minnesota defense during its second straight trip to the NASL Soccer Bowl. He played nearly 2,600 minutes for Minnesota in 32 starts. The Stars ended up losing in a shoot-out in the second leg of the 2012 Soccer Bowl.

In 2013, a new owner re-branded the team as Minnesota United FC. Kallman played for Minnesota United in 2013, 2014, and 2015, appearing in 29 games and scoring one goal. Kallman is the only player to play three years for three different professional teams in Minnesota. He played in 153 games, including league games and the U.S. Open Cup.

== Personal ==
The son of Rich and Laura Kallman, Brian is the oldest of six children. All of his siblings played varsity soccer at Woodbury High School. Kallman's brother Brent played at Creighton University before turning professional for Minnesota United FC. His sister, Kassey, plays professionally as well, and has represented the US national team at the youth level.
