= Daniel Mendes (footballer, born 1981) =

Brazilian footballer

Personal information
- Full name: Daniel Freire Mendes
- Date of birth: January 18, 1981 (age 45)
- Place of birth: São Paulo, Brazil
- Height: 1.75 m (5 ft 9 in)
- Positions: Striker; winger

Youth career
- 1990–1994: Palmeiras
- 1995: Corinthians
- 1996–1997: Clube Atlético Juventus
- 1998: Botafogo de Futebol e Regatas

Senior career*
| Years | Team | Apps | (Gls) |
| 1999–2003 | Botafogo FR | | (5) |
| 2003 | Kalmar FF | 26 | (14) |
| 2004 | Esporte Clube Bahia | 5 | (0) |
| 2004 | Ulsan Hyundai | 8 | (1) |
| 2005 | Atlético Nacional | | |
| 2006 | Degerfors IF | 16 | (10) |
| 2006–2008 | AIK | 54 | (11) |
| 2009–2014 | Kalmar FF | 103 | (24) |
| 2013 | → GAIS (loan) | 15 | (7) |
| 2014-2016 | Minnesota United | 36 | (15) |
| 2017 | Florida Tropics (indoor) | 7 | (0) |
| 2017 | The Villages | 2 | (2) |
- * Club domestic league appearances and goals as of March 4, 2018

Daniel Freire Mendes, (Portuguese pronunciation: [ˈmẽdʒis], born 18 January 1981 in São Paulo) is a retired Brazilian football player who started his career in Brazil back in 1999 with only 18 years of age, moved in 2014 to U.S to play for Minnesota United FC, after a long career in the Allsvenskan, the Swedish top league.

== Career ==
He has previously played for Kalmar FF, AIK and Degerfors IF.

Mendes scored Allsvenskan's fastest goal in history after only 6 seconds. In 2006, Mendes scored most goals per minute played for AIK. All of his goals were scored as a substitute, earning him a reputation as the squad's "super sub".

In 2014, Mendes left Sweden to go on loan with Minnesota United FC in the NASL. His stay was made permanent on October 9. Mendes remained with Minnesota until their move to Major League Soccer following the 2016 NASL season.

Mendes joined the Major Arena Soccer League's Florida Tropics SC midway through their first season in early 2017.

After the arena season ended, Mendes stayed in Florida, signing with The Villages SC of the fourth-division Premier Development League.

In December 2017, Mendes agreed to a new deal with the Tropics and returned to the team's lineup.
