= Aaron Pitchkolan =

American soccer player and coach

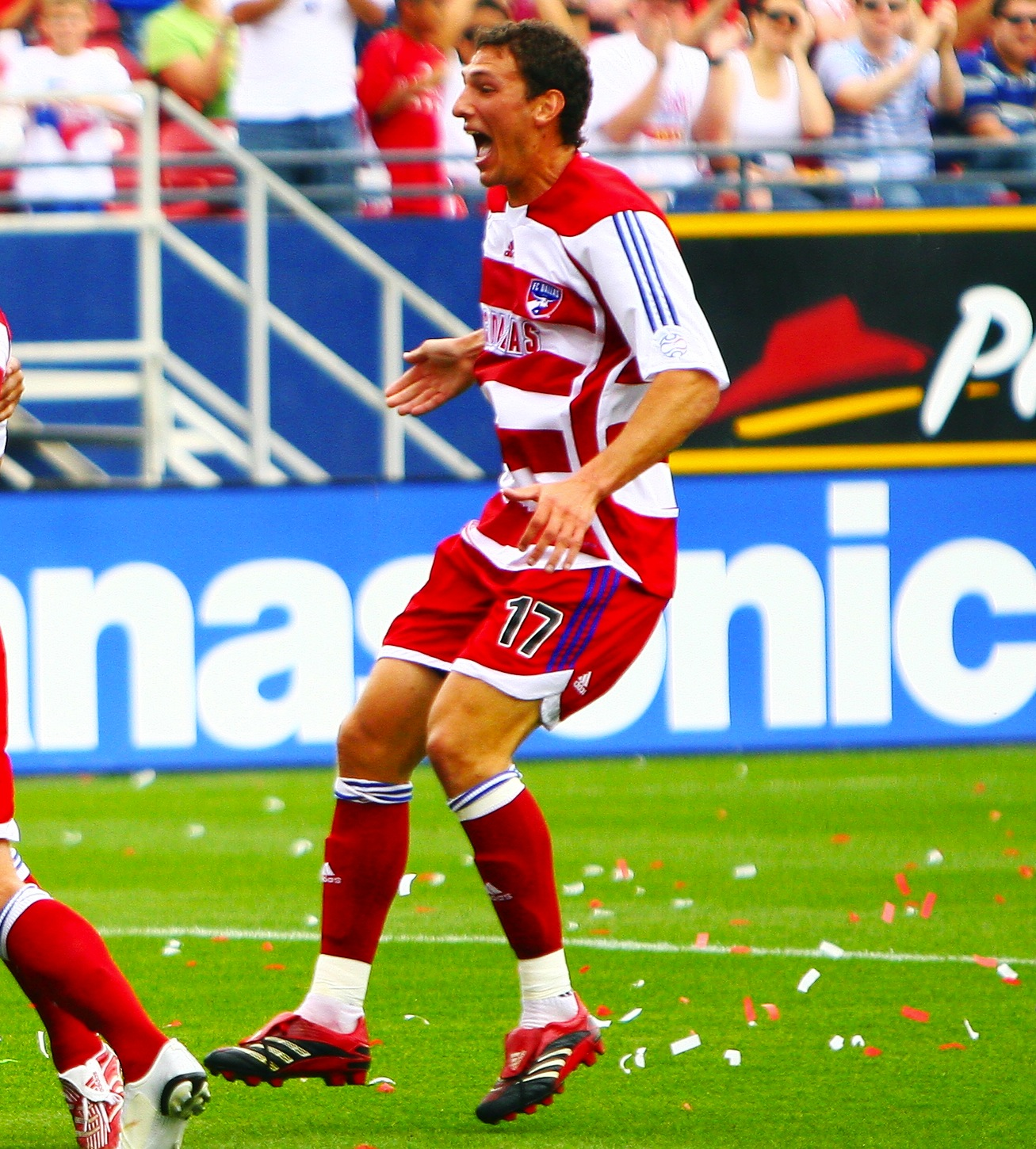

Personal information
- Full name: Aaron Pitchkolan
- Date of birth: March 14, 1983 (age 43)
- Place of birth: Aurora, Colorado, U.S.
- Height: 6 ft 2 in (1.88 m)
- Positions: Defender; midfielder

College career
Years	Team	Apps	(Gls)
2001	Tampa Spartans		
2002–2004	West Virginia Mountaineers		

Senior career*
Years	Team	Apps	(Gls)
2004	Boulder Rapids Reserve	19	(2)
2005–2009	FC Dallas	68	(5)
2009	San Jose Earthquakes	9	(0)
2010	Rochester Rhinos	25	(3)
2011	Puerto Rico Islanders	27	(3)
2012	San Antonio Scorpions	23	(2)
2013–2016	Minnesota United	95	(5)
2017	Jacksonville Armada	31	(0)

Managerial career
- 2018: Jacksonville Armada (assistant)
- 2019: Jacksonville Armada U-23
- * Club domestic league appearances and goals as of 11:22, 30 October 2017 (UTC)

Aaron Pitchkolan (born March 14, 1983) is an American retired soccer player and coach.

== Career ==
=== College ===
Pitchkolan played high school soccer at Regis Jesuit High School in Aurora. He also featured for club sides Real Colorado and Cherry Creek Lightning and his local Olympic Development team. He began his college career at University of Tampa where he played in 19 games as a freshman and helped the team win the NCAA Division II championship. Pitchkolan transferred to West Virginia University where he played in 54 games scoring 11 goals over three seasons. In the college offseason, Pitchkolan played in the USL Premier Development League for Boulder Rapids Reserve.

=== Professional ===
Pitchkolan was bypassed in the 2005 MLS SuperDraft and had to wait until the second round of the Supplemental Draft to be selected. Pitchkolan appeared in his first MLS game on May 15, 2005, as a substitute for Carey Talley in a game against the Colorado Rapids. His first goal came a game later on May 22, 2005, in a 5–2 win against Chivas USA. In all, Pitchkolan played in 20 games scoring 3 goals in his first MLS season. In 2006, Pitchkolan featured in only 10 games, all as a substitute, and playing a total of 94 minutes for the first team. A highlight of his season was his stoppage time winner against the Kansas City Wizards on April 23, 2006, in a match that ended 3–2. In 2007, Pitchkolan made the transition to center back, a position he occasionally played in college. He made 16 appearances, 11 as starts, but did not score any goals. In 2008, he played 21 games, starting in nine and scored one goal. He was used as cover for Dallas' veteran defender, Duilio Davino. Aaron was one of three players to be active for all 30 regular season games along with Kenny Cooper and Dominic Oduro. Pitch was left unprotected for the 2008 MLS Expansion Draft, but he was not selected.

On April 28, 2009, FC Dallas traded Pitchkolan to the San Jose Earthquakes for a conditional pick in the 2011 MLS SuperDraft, but was later put on waivers on March 4, 2010.

He subsequently signed for the Rochester Rhinos of the USSF Division 2 Professional League in April 2010. On February 25, 2011, it was announced that the Puerto Rico Islanders had acquired his rights from the Rhinos.

In January 2013, Pitchkolan was signed by Minnesota United FC. With a header to feed Lucas Rodriguez, Pitchkolan recorded the club's first assist on April 20 against FC Edmonton. The next week, he scored his first goal with Minnesota, a game-winner in a 3–2 victory at Atlanta. Pitchkolan scored two goals and contributed one assist in 2013, playing 1,665 minutes with 20 appearances for Minnesota. He was named to the NASL Best XI in 2013 for playing a key role on the defense and was selected to the NASL Team of The Week three times throughout the year.

== Honors ==
=== Rochester Rhinos ===
- USSF D-2 Pro League Regular Season Champions (1): 2010

=== Individual ===
- USSF D-2 Pro League Best XI (1): 2010
