= Brent Kallman =

American soccer player (born 1990)

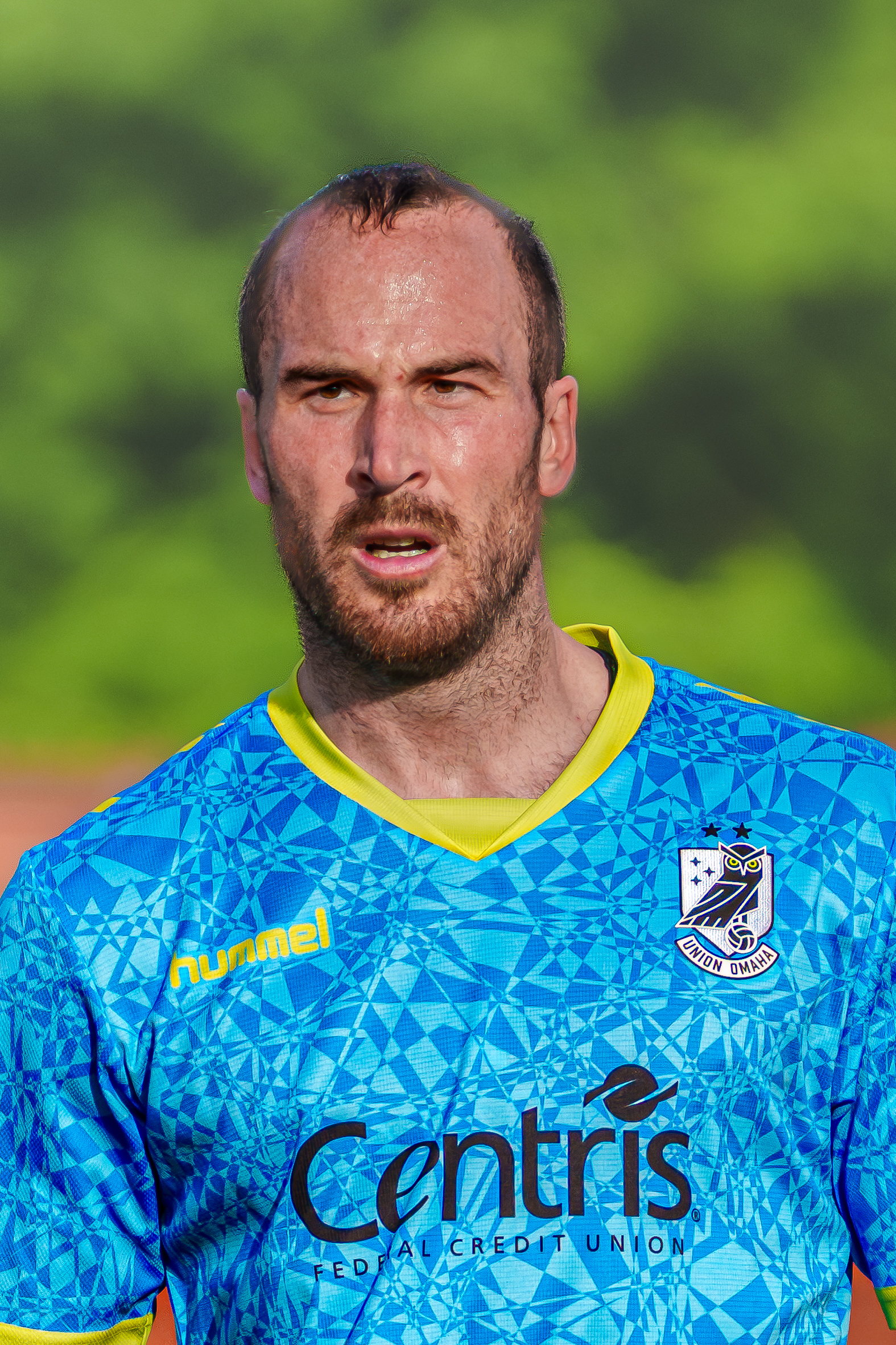
- Kallman with Union Omaha in 2026

Personal information
- Date of birth: October 4, 1990 (age 36)
- Place of birth: Omaha, Nebraska, United States
- Height: 6 ft 2 in (1.88 m)
- Position: Defender

Team information
- Current team: Union Omaha
- Number: 14

College career
Years	Team	Apps	(Gls)
2009–2012	Creighton Bluejays	78	(3)

Senior career*
Years	Team	Apps	(Gls)
2012	Des Moines Menace	6	(2)
2013–2016	Minnesota United	40	(1)
2017–2023	Minnesota United	114	(6)
2020	→ El Paso Locomotive (loan)	5	(1)
2024	Nashville SC	13	(0)
2025–	Union Omaha	49	(1)
- * Club domestic league appearances and goals as of November 2, 2026

Brent Kallman (born October 4, 1990) is an American professional soccer player who currently plays for USL League One club Union Omaha. Kallman formerly played for Minnesota United when the team competed in the North American Soccer League and MLS.

== Career ==
Kallman graduated from Woodbury High School in Woodbury, Minnesota. He was a multi-sport athlete, earning four letters in soccer, three in tennis, two in basketball and one in football. Kalian attended Minnesota Thunder Academy junior soccer development program.

=== College ===
Kallman attended Creighton University and played four seasons from 2009 to 2012, helping the program make back to back college cup appearances in 2011–12.

=== Professional ===
He signed his first professional contract with Minnesota United FC in May 2013. He played for Minnesota United, splitting time between the reserves and full team until the 2016 season when he became a mainstay of the back line. In January 2017, Kallman was signed to United as they transitioned to MLS.

On August 15, 2020, Kallman moved on loan to USL Championship side El Paso Locomotive.

Kallman signed with Major League Soccer club Nashville SC on February 13, 2024. He was released by Nashville following their 2024 season.

On February 14, 2025, Kallman signed with USL League One side Union Omaha.

On 18 April 2026, Kallman scored his first goal for The Owls in a 2–1 loss against the Richmond Kickers.

== Personal life ==
His siblings Brian and Kassey are also professional soccer players.

In addition to professional soccer, Kallman is an accomplished poker player, having earned $193,192 in tournament poker. His best live cash is $62,110 on November 23, 2018, at the $3,500 WPT Seminole Rock N Roll Poker Open Main Event.
