= Andrew Fontein =

American soccer player

Personal information
- Date of birth: March 3, 1990 (age 36)
- Place of birth: Las Vegas Valley, United States
- Height: 1.86 m (6 ft 1 in)
- Position: Goalkeeper

Youth career
- 2004–2007: Sierra Vista Mountain Lions
- 2004–2007: Las Vegas Premier

College career
Years	Team	Apps	(Gls)
2008–2011	UC Irvine Anteaters	63	(0)

Senior career*
Years	Team	Apps	(Gls)
2012–2013	Tampa Bay Rowdies	4	(0)
2014–2015	Minnesota United	0	(0)
- * Club domestic league appearances and goals as of February 8, 2016

Andrew Fontein (born March 3, 1990, in Las Vegas, Nevada) is an American soccer player who last played as a goalkeeper for Minnesota United.

== Career ==
Fontein signed with the Tampa Bay Rowdies of the North American Soccer League on March 23, 2012, after trialing with the club after leaving his college UC Irvine where he played as the #1 keeper for four seasons. Fontein however did not make his debut for the Rowdies till the 2013 season in which he started for the team in their first game of the season against the Carolina Railhawks on April 6, 2013, in which he managed to keep the clean-sheet as Tampa Bay drew the match 0–0.

== Career statistics ==
=== Club ===
Statistics accurate as of April 7, 2013

Club	Season	League		US Open Cup		Other		CONCACAF		Total	
Club	Season	Apps	Goals	Apps	Goals	Apps	Goals	Apps	Goals	Apps	Goals
Tampa Bay Rowdies	2013	1	0	0	0	0	0	—	—	1	0
Career total		1	0	0	0	0	0	0	0	1	0
