= Tiago Calvano =

Brazilian footballer

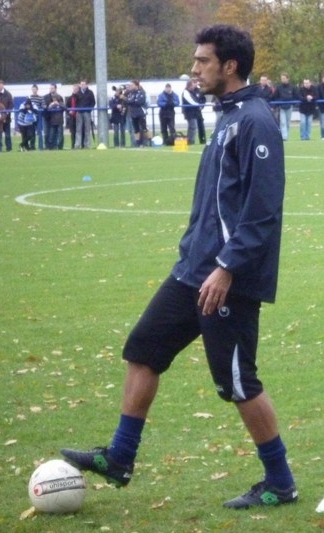

Personal information
- Full name: Tiago Coelho Branco Calvano
- Date of birth: 19 May 1981 (age 45)
- Place of birth: Rio de Janeiro, Brazil
- Height: 1.88 m (6 ft 2 in)
- Position: Centre back

Youth career
- Botafogo

Senior career*
Years	Team	Apps	(Gls)
2001–2002	Botafogo	13	(1)
2002–2003	Perugia	0	(0)
2003	Sambenedettese	0	(0)
2004–2005	FC Barcelona B	27	(1)
2005–2008	Young Boys	86	(5)
2008–2010	MSV Duisburg	30	(0)
2010–2011	Fortuna Düsseldorf	8	(0)
2010–2011	Fortuna Düsseldorf II	1	(0)
2011–2013	Newcastle Jets	28	(1)
2013–2014	Sydney FC	12	(0)
2014–2016	Minnesota United FC	71	(2)
2017–2018	Penn FC	41	(1)
- * Club domestic league appearances and goals as of 13:49, 15 October 2018 (UTC)

Tiago Coelho Branco Calvano (born 19 May 1981), sometimes known as just Tiago, is a former Brazilian footballer.

== Career ==
Calvano is a defender with Italian citizenship who made 13 Campeonato Brasileiro Série A appearances for Botafogo before moving to Europe.

=== Newcastle Jets ===
In May 2011, it was announced that he signed a two-year contract with Newcastle Jets FC, joining them for the 2011–12 and 2012–13 A-League seasons. Calvano impressed during his first season with the Jets. Despite giving away three penalties he was very solid in the back which persuaded incoming coach Gary Van Egmond to keep him in the starting eleven. He scored his first goal for Newcastle in a round five match against Perth Glory in the 2012-13 A-League season. Tiago was released by the Newcastle Jets on 17 January 2013, due to lack of game time and a rumoured falling out of favour with head coach Van Egmond.

=== Sydney FC ===
On 17 January 2013, Tiago signed with Sydney FC as an injury replacement for Pascal Bosschaart. Coming straight into the starting eleven after signing for Sydney, he made his debut in Sydney's 7–1 demolition of Wellington Phoenix at Allianz Stadium. Sydney made his position permanent, signing a one-year deal with the club for the 2013–14 A-League season.

=== Minnesota United ===
Towards the end of his contract, Tiago and Sydney FC agreed to a mutual termination of his contract to allow him to take up an offer of a contract in the United States for NASL side Minnesota United FC.

=== Harrisburg City Islanders ===
Tiago signed with USL side Harrisburg City Islanders on 23 March 2017.
