= 2016 Ottawa Fury FC season =

Ottawa Fury FC
2016 season
- President: John Pugh
- Head Coach: Paul Dalglish
- Stadium: TD Place Stadium
- NASL: Spr.: 9th Fall: 12th Com.: 10th
- Soccer Bowl: Did not qualify
- Canadian Championship: Semi-finals
- Top goalscorer: League: Carl Haworth (7); All: Carl Haworth (8)
- Highest home attendance: League: 7,847 (11 June v. OKC); All: 9,057 (1 June v. Vancouver)
- Lowest home attendance: League: 4,317 (7 May v. Minnesota); All: 3,946 (18 May v. Edmonton)
- Average home league attendance: League: 5,482; All: 5,596
Home colours	Away colours

The 2016 Ottawa Fury FC season was the club's third season at the professional level, and its last in the North American Soccer League before its subsequent move to the United Soccer League.

== Off-season ==
=== Staff ===
On 20 November 2015, Paul Dalglish was announced as the club's new head coach, replacing Marc Dos Santos who had moved on to a head coaching position with Swope Park Rangers and an assistant coaching position with Sporting Kansas City. On 2 December 2015, the Fury announced that assistant coach Martin Nash and goalkeeping coach Bruce Grobbelaar had been re-signed for the 2016 season. A week later it was announced that technical director Philip Dos Santos had left the club for other opportunities and that former Chelsea academy coach Darko Buser had been promoted to the position.

=== Roster moves ===
On 17 November 2015, the club announced it had re-signed 2015 NASL Golden Glove winner Romuald Peiser to a two-year contract. On 14 December, the club announced it had officially released Drew Beckie, Andrew Wiedeman, Tom Heinemann, Uğur Albayrak, Oliver, Nicki Paterson and Aly Hassan, and had picked up contract options for Rafael Alves, Carl Haworth, Marcel DeBellis, Paulo Jr. and had re-signed Brandon Poltronieri. The following day, management announced the transfers of Richie Ryan, Siniša Ubiparipović and Ryan Richter. On 16 December, it was announced that Canada national team captain Julian de Guzman and Canadian youth international Mauro Eustáquio had re-signed with the club.

On 18 December 2015, the Fury announced their first three new signings of the off-season; Jamaican centre forward Dennis Chin, and two of manager Paul Dalglish's former players from the Austin Aztex, American midfielder Lance Rozeboom and Brazilian defender Fernando Timbó.

On 12 January 2016, the club announced the signing of Northern Irish midfielder Jonny Steele. The same day it was announced that Brazilians Paulo Jr. and Rafael Alves had been re-signed through 2017. The following day, it was announced that Canadian international Kyle Porter had been signed by the club. On 14 January, the club announced the signing of Rich Balchan and recent USL champion Onua Obasi The following day, Ottawa announced the signing of English midfielder James Bailey. In the same press release, it was announced that Irish centre-back Colin Falvey had been purchased by Indy Eleven for an undisclosed fee.

On 18 January, the Fury announced the pre-signing of Argentine midfielder Gerardo Bruna from Football League Two's Accrington Stanley for the end of the 2015–16 English football season. On 2 February, the club announced the signing of two Canadian players, midfielder Mozzi Gyorio and goalkeeper Andrew MacRae. On 4 February, Miami FC purchased defender Mason Trafford from the club through a clause in the player's contract which required the Fury to transfer him if a certain minimum fee was offered. On 11 February, the Fury announced the signing of American centre-back Kyle Venter from the USL's Tulsa Roughnecks.

== Season review ==
=== February ===
Pre-season training camp began on Monday, 15 February with indoor training at the Branchaud-Brière Complex in Gatineau. At the start of training camp, it was revealed that Accrington Stanley had released Gerardo Bruna, allowing him to join the Fury in time for pre-season and avoid an overly long playing season.

The Fury played their first pre-season match against the academy team on the 19th, an informal game consisting of two 36-minute halves with different lineups. Supplementing the first-team lineup was American trialist forward Miles Byass, as well as four academy players: Jeff Addai, Dario Conte, Emad Houache and Ndzemdzela "Zoom" Langwa. The primary focus of the match was fitness, and despite multiple good scoring opportunities for the first team, the game ultimately finished in a scoreless draw.

A week later, the club played its first pre-season match against another club, travelling to Toronto to play reserve side Toronto FC II. Ottawa scored first in the match off a penalty drawn by Paulo Jr. in the 30th minute, with new arrival Gerardo Bruna converting the spot kick. At the half, Dalglish substituted all outfield players. In the 60th minute, keeper Romuald Peiser was substituted in favour of Andrew MacRae. The Fury lost their lead in the 85th minute as Sal Bernal drew TFC level. In the final minutes of the match, centre forward Dennis Chin sealed the win with a spectacular diving header off a cross by trialist Miles Byass. In addition to Byass, the Fury fielded Academy fullback Zoom Langwa in place of Onua Obasi who had not yet arrived at camp. Goalkeeper Marcel DeBellis was also rested for the match due to a knock. The club then travelled to Casa Grande, Arizona for outdoor training and two friendlies the following week.

=== March ===
In the afternoon of 2 March, prior to a friendly against Indy Eleven, the club announced the acquisition of Brazilian forward Pablo Dyego on a season-long loan from Fluminense and of Canadian international Marcel de Jong on a permanent deal. Both new signings appeared as substitutes in the second half of the match. The first half began quietly and ultimately ended 0–0 with each team having one scoring chance. At the half, Ottawa changed all its players but Rafael Alves. In the 63rd minute, the game broke open as the recently signed Pablo Dyego supplied a cross to compatriot Paulo Jr. who scored the match's opening goal. Three minutes later, Dyego added his own with a volley which caught Indy keeper Keith Cardona off his line to make it 2–0. In the 74th minute Paulo Jr. was fouled in the box, resulting in a penalty which was converted for the second match in a row by Gerardo Bruna. This scoreline would hold, but not before Pablo Dyego was forced off due to a knock after colliding with the opposing keeper. Academy player Zoom Langwa again made a start in place of Onua Obasi and Jeff Addai also appeared later in the match as a substitute for Alves.

The Fury concluded their trip to Arizona with a dominating 4–0 win over Real Salt Lake's locally based academy team. Paulo Jr. again opened the scoring for Ottawa off a pass from Fernando Timbó in the first half. This scoreline held until halftime, when all of the Fury players other than Carl Haworth were substituted. Early in the second half, Dennis Chin added to the lead after finishing a cross from Mozzi Gyorio. Chin then set up a goal by Carl Haworth, his first of the pre-season. Haworth then returned the favour, feeding Chin for the match's fourth and final goal. Striker Pablo Dyego did not appear in the match, possibly the result of the injury he sustained towards the end of the previous friendly against Indy Eleven. Academy players Jeff Addai and Zoom Langwa again appeared for the first team.

On 10 March, the Fury played a friendly against USL neighbours Rochester Rhinos. The match consisted of four 30-minute quarters, totaling 120 minutes. In the second quarter, Paulo Jr. converted a penalty to give Ottawa a 1–0 lead. Shortly afterwards, Rochester scored to bring the teams level going into half-time. At the break, Ottawa substituted all its players save Lance Rozeboom. The third quarter went poorly for the Fury as the Rhinos added another two goals to go up 3–1. Goalkeeper Andrew MacRae then made a save on a penalty to keep the deficit at two. In the fourth quarter Mozzi Gyorio clawed one back for Ottawa off a pass by fellow Canadian Carl Haworth. Academy player Jeff Addai then supplied a cross to Gerardo Bruna, who finished late in the game to seal a draw.

One week after the Rhinos friendly, the club issued a press release stating that Pablo Dyego and Kyle Venter had suffered knee injuries that were expected to sideline the players for six to eight months each (expected to return September–November).

The club finished its pre-season slate with a 3–1 win over FC Montreal on 19 March. James Bailey scored his first goal of pre-season inside the opening 5 minutes to give the Fury the lead, however recent Fury loanee Jérémy Gagnon-Laparé clawed one back for Montreal in the 29th minute to finish the half 1–1. Carl Haworth then proceeded to secure the win for Ottawa with a brace in the 57th and 87th minutes.

On 25 March, the Fury announced the signing of Israeli winger Idan Vered. The following day, it was revealed that Brandon Poltronieri had left the club.

=== April ===
Ottawa opened its league season with a match in New York City against the Cosmos in a rematch of last season's Soccer Bowl. Despite strong spells of possession, the Fury had multiple defensive errors punished by the defending champions, who came away 3–0 winners.

On 7 April the club announced it had signed Uruguayan midfielder Bryan Olivera on loan from Fluminense for the season.

== Squad ==
As of to match played 29 October 2016

No.	Name	Nationality	Position	Date of birth (age)	Signed from	Signed in	Apps.	Goals
Goalkeepers
1	Romuald Peiser	(France)	GK	3 August 1979 (aged 37)	(Portugal) Académica	2014	79	0
12	Andrew MacRae	(Canada)	GK	24 August 1990 (aged 26)	Unattached	2016	0	0
24	Marcel DeBellis	(Canada)	GK	17 April 1991 (aged 25)	(Italy) Ascoli	2014	7	0
Defenders
2	Rich Balchan	(United States)	RB/CB	18 January 1989 (aged 27)	(United States) Tampa Bay Rowdies	2016	4	0
3	Eddie Edward	(Canada)	RB	20 September 1988 (aged 28)	Edmonton	2016	19	0
5	Kyle Venter	(United States)	CB	13 March 1991 (aged 25)	(United States) Tulsa Roughnecks	2016	0	0
13	Adam Malekos	(Canada)	DF	27 June 1997 (aged 19)	Academy	2016	0	0
14	Onua Obasi	(England)	LB/CM	24 September 1988 (aged 28)	(United States) Rochester Rhinos	2016	19	0
18	Mallan Roberts	(Canada)	CB	6 June 1992 (aged 24)	loan from Edmonton	2016	22	1
19	Kyle Porter	(Canada)	RB/FW	19 January 1990 (aged 26)	(United States) Atlanta Silverbacks	2016	18	0
33	Rafael Alves	(Brazil)	CB	18 January 1985 (aged 31)	(United States) Fort Lauderdale Strikers	2015	68	4
77	Fernando Timbó	(Brazil)	CB/LB	29 May 1990 (aged 26)	(United States) Austin Aztex	2016	23	2
Midfielders
4	Dario Conte	(Canada)	CM	2 November 1997 (aged 18)	Academy	2016	1	0
6	Julian de Guzman	(Canada)	CM	25 March 1981 (aged 35)	(Greece) Skoda Xanthi	2015	29	0
7	Ryan Williams	(England)	CM	8 April 1991 (aged 25)	(Scotland) Inverness CT	2016	18	4
8	James Bailey	(England)	CM/RB	18 September 1988 (aged 28)	(India) Pune City	2016	33	0
9	Bryan Olivera	(Uruguay)	CM/RW	11 March 1994 (aged 22)	loan from (Brazil) Fluminense	2016	22	0
11	Mozzi Gyorio	(Canada)	CM	1 August 1989 (aged 27)	(United States) Austin Aztex	2016	4	0
20	Mauro Eustáquio	(Canada)	CM	10 February 1993 (aged 23)	(Portugal) Sporting Pombal	2014	49	2
22	Jamar Dixon	(Canada)	CM/LW	5 June 1989 (aged 27)	(Finland) FF Jaro	2016	12	0
25	Lance Rozeboom	(United States)	CM/CB	31 May 1989 (aged 27)	(United States) Austin Aztex	2016	35	1
51	Maxim Tissot	(Canada)	MF/LB	13 April 1992 (aged 24)	Montreal Impact	2016	19	2
Forwards
10	Gerardo Bruna	(Argentina)	FW/CM	29 January 1991 (aged 25)	(England) Accrington Stanley	2016	6	0
16	Thomas Stewart	(Northern Ireland)	FW	12 November 1986 (aged 29)	(United States) Sacramento Republic	2016	17	3
17	Carl Haworth	(Canada)	FW	9 July 1989 (aged 27)	Ottawa Fury (PDL)	2014	85	12
92	Giuseppe Gentile	(United States)	FW	10 October 1992 (aged 24)	(United States) Fort Lauderdale Strikers	2016	16	4
99	Danny Mwanga	(Democratic Republic of the Congo)	FW	17 July 1991 (aged 25)	loan from (United States) Tampa Bay Rowdies	2016	8	1

== Transfers ==
=== In ===
Date	Position	Nationality	Name	From	Fee
18 December 2015	FW	(Jamaica)	Dennis Chin	(United States) Arizona United	Free
18 December 2015	MF	(United States)	Lance Rozeboom	(United States) Austin Aztex	Free
18 December 2015	DF	(Brazil)	Fernando Timbó	(United States) Austin Aztex	Free
12 January 2016	MF	(Northern Ireland)	Jonny Steele	Unattached	Free
13 January 2016	DF	(Canada)	Kyle Porter	(United States) Atlanta Silverbacks	Free
14 January 2016	DF	(England)	Onua Obasi	(United States) Rochester Rhinos	Free
14 January 2016	DF	(United States)	Rich Balchan	(United States) Tampa Bay Rowdies	Free
15 January 2016	MF	(England)	James Bailey	(India) Pune City	Free
2 February 2016	MF	(Canada)	Mozzi Gyorio	(United States) Austin Aztex	Free
2 February 2016	GK	(Canada)	Andrew MacRae	Unattached	Free
11 February 2016	DF	(United States)	Kyle Venter	(United States) Tulsa Roughnecks	Free
15 February 2016	FW	(Argentina)	Gerardo Bruna	(England) Accrington Stanley	Free
2 March 2016	FW	(Brazil)	Pablo Dyego	(Brazil) Fluminense	Loan
2 March 2016	MF	(Canada)	Marcel de Jong	(United States) Sporting Kansas City	Free
25 March 2016	FW	(Israel)	Idan Vered	(Serbia) Red Star Belgrade	Free
7 April 2016	MF	(Uruguay)	Bryan Olivera	(Brazil) Fluminense	Loan
4 June 2016	DF	(Canada)	Mallan Roberts	Edmonton	Loan
10 June 2016	MF	(Canada)	Dario Conte	Academy	Trainee
10 June 2016	DF	(Canada)	Adam Malekos	Academy	Trainee
28 June 2016	DF	(Canada)	Eddie Edward	Edmonton	Free
8 July 2016	FW	(United States)	Giuseppe Gentile	(United States) Fort Lauderdale Strikers	Swap
12 July 2016	FW	(Northern Ireland)	Thomas Stewart	(United States) Sacramento Republic	Undisclosed
15 July 2016	MF	(Canada)	Maxim Tissot	Montreal Impact	Free
19 July 2016	MF	(England)	Ryan Williams	(Scotland) Inverness CT	Free
20 July 2016	MF	(Canada)	Jamar Dixon	(Finland) FF Jaro	Undisclosed
3 August 2016	FW	(Democratic Republic of the Congo)	Danny Mwanga	(United States) Tampa Bay Rowdies	Loan

=== Out ===
Date	Position	Nationality	Name	To	Fee
7 December 2015	FW	(United States)	Andrew Wiedeman	(United States) Cincinnati	Free
14 December 2015	MF	(Canada)	Jérémy Gagnon-Laparé	Montreal Impact	End of loan
14 December 2015	FW	(United States)	Tom Heinemann	(United States) Tampa Bay Rowdies	Free
15 December 2015	MF	(Republic of Ireland)	Richie Ryan	(United States) Jacksonville Armada	Undisclosed
15 December 2015	MF	(Bosnia and Herzegovina)	Siniša Ubiparipović	(United States) Indy Eleven	Undisclosed
17 December 2015	DF	(Canada)	Drew Beckie	(United States) Carolina RailHawks	Free
22 December 2015	DF	(United States)	Ryan Richter	(United States) Bethlehem Steel	Undisclosed
15 January 2016	DF	(Republic of Ireland)	Colin Falvey	(United States) Indy Eleven	Undisclosed
26 January 2016	MF	(Scotland)	Nicki Paterson	(United States) Indy Eleven	Free
31 January 2016	FW	(Turkey)	Uğur Albayrak	(Germany) Viktoria Aschaffenburg	Free
4 February 2016	DF	(Canada)	Mason Trafford	(United States) Miami	Undisclosed
11 February 2016	FW	(United States)	Aly Hassan	(United States) Carolina RailHawks	Free
10 March 2016	FW	(Brazil)	Oliver	Puerto Rico	Free
26 March 2016	DF	(Costa Rica)	Brandon Poltronieri	(United States) Arizona United	Free
22 June 2016	FW	(Israel)	Idan Vered	(Israel) Beitar Jerusalem	Free
7 July 2016	FW	(Brazil)	Pablo Dyego	(Brazil) Fluminense	Loan end
8 July 2016	FW	(Brazil)	Paulo Jr.	(United States) Fort Lauderdale Strikers	Swap
11 July 2016	MF	(Canada)	Marcel de Jong	Vancouver Whitecaps	Free
14 July 2016	MF	(Northern Ireland)	Jonny Steele	(United States) Miami	Undisclosed
26 August 2016	FW	(Jamaica)	Dennis Chin	(Israel) Ironi Nesher	Undisclosed

=== Trial ===
Date From	Date To	Position	Nationality	Name	Last club	Signed?
15 February 2016	2 March 2016	FW	(United States)	Miles Byass	Unattached	No

== Friendlies ==
=== Pre-season ===
19 February 2016	Ottawa Fury	0 – 0	Ottawa Fury Academy	Gatineau, QC
10:45 EDT UTC−5		Report		Stadium: Branchaud-Brière Complex
Note: Match was played in two 36-minute halves.

26 February 2016	Toronto II	1 – 2	Ottawa Fury	Toronto
15:00 EDT UTC−5	Bernal 85'	Report	Bruna 30' (pen.); Chin 90'	Stadium: Kia Training Grounds

2 March 2016	Indy Eleven	0 – 3	Ottawa Fury	Casa Grande, AZ
18:00 EDT UTC−5		Report	Paulo Jr. 63'; Dyego 66'; Bruna 74' (pen.)	Stadium: Grande Sports World

6 March 2016	RSL-Arizona Academy	0 – 4	Ottawa Fury	Casa Grande, AZ
13:00 EDT UTC−5		Report	Paulo Jr. 12'; Chin 59', 87'; Haworth 76'	Stadium: Grande Sports World

10 March 2016	Rochester Rhinos	3 – 3	Ottawa Fury	Victor, NY
15:00 EDT UTC−5	Volesky (2nd quarter); Duba (3rd quarter), (3rd quarter)	Report	Paulo Jr. (2nd quarter); Gyorio (4th quarter); Bruna (4th quarter)	Stadium: Pinnacle Athletic Facility
Note: Match was played in four 30-minute quarters.

19 March 2016	FC Montreal	1 – 3	Ottawa Fury	Montreal
14:00 EDT UTC−5	Gagnon-Laparé 29'	Report	Bailey 3'; Haworth 57', 87'	Stadium: Olympic Stadium

=== Friendly statistics ===
Rnk	Pos	Nat	Name	Goals	Assists
1	FW	(Canada)	Carl Haworth	3	2
1	FW	(Jamaica)	Dennis Chin	3	1
1	FW	(Argentina)	Gerardo Bruna	3	0
1	FW	(Brazil)	Paulo Jr.	3	0
5	FW	(Brazil)	Pablo Dyego	1	1
5	MF	(Canada)	Mozzi Gyorio	1	1
5	MF	(England)	James Bailey	1	0
8	DF	(Canada)	Jeff Addai^{1}	0	1
8	FW	(United States)	Miles Byass^{2}	0	1
8	DF	(Brazil)	Fernando Timbó	0	1
Total				15	8

^{1} Academy player.

^{2} Trialist.

== Competitions ==
=== NASL Spring Season ===
==== Standings ====
Pos	Team	Pld	W	D	L	GF	GA	GD	Pts	Qualification
1	Indy Eleven (S)	10	4	6	0	15	8	+7	18	Playoffs
2	New York Cosmos	10	6	0	4	15	8	+7	18	
3	FC Edmonton	10	5	2	3	9	7	+2	17	
4	Minnesota United	10	5	1	4	16	12	+4	16	
5	Tampa Bay Rowdies	10	4	4	2	11	9	+2	16	
6	Fort Lauderdale Strikers	10	4	3	3	12	12	0	15	
7	Carolina RailHawks	10	4	2	4	11	13	−2	14	
8	Rayo OKC	10	3	3	4	11	12	−1	12	
9	Ottawa Fury	10	2	3	5	9	14	−5	9	
10	Jacksonville Armada	10	1	4	5	5	11	−6	7	
11	Miami FC	10	1	4	5	7	15	−8	7	

Source: NASL
Rules for classification: 1) points; 2) total goal differential; 3) total goals scored; 4) head-to-head record; 5) away goal differential; 6) away goals scored
(S) Spring season champion

==== Results summary ====
Overall								Home						Away					
Pld	W	D	L	GF	GA	GD	Pts	W	D	L	GF	GA	GD	W	D	L	GF	GA	GD
10	2	3	5	9	14	−5	9	2	2	1	7	5	+2	0	1	4	2	9	−7

Last updated: June 11, 2016.
Source: Match reports

==== Results by round ====
Round	1	2	3	4	5	6	7	8	9	10
Ground	A	A	A	A	H	H	H	H	A	H
Result	L	D	L	L	W	D	W	L	L	D
Position	11	10	11	11	9	9	9	9	9	9

Updated to match(es) played on June 11, 2016. Source: Match reports
A = Away; H = Home; W = Win; D = Draw; L = Loss

==== Match reports ====
3 April 2016 1	New York Cosmos	3 – 0	Ottawa Fury	Hempstead, NY
18:00 EDT UTC−4	Arango 36', 38'; Bover (yellow card) 57'; Guenzatti (yellow card) 60'; Arrieta (yellow card) 70'; Moffat 71'	Report		Stadium: James M. Shuart Stadium; Attendance: 5,094; Referee: Mark Kadlecik

9 April 2016 2	Indy Eleven	1 – 1	Ottawa Fury	Indianapolis
19:30 EDT UTC−4	Mares (yellow card) 55'; Paterson (yellow card) 66'; Vuković 89'	Report	Steele (yellow card) 18'; Vered 56'; Bruna (yellow card) 83'; Chin (yellow card) 84'	Stadium: Michael A. Carroll Stadium; Attendance: 9,104; Referee: Hilario Grajeda

16 April 2016 3	Carolina RailHawks	1 – 0	Ottawa Fury	Cary, NC
19:30 EDT UTC−4	Shipalane 47'; Pérez (yellow card) 50'	Report	de Jong (yellow card) 36'	Stadium: WakeMed Soccer Park; Attendance: 4,208; Referee: Kevin Terry Jr.

24 April 2016 4	Edmonton	2 – 0	Ottawa Fury	Edmonton
16:00 EDT UTC−4	Watson 46'; Keegan 69'; Raudales (yellow card) 76'	Report	Bailey (yellow card) 56'; Timbó (yellow card) 67'	Stadium: Clarke Stadium; Attendance: 1,500; Referee: Yusri Rudolf

30 April 2016 5	Ottawa Fury	2 – 0	Miami	Ottawa
14:00 EDT UTC−4	Timbó 25'; Rozeboom (yellow card) 57'; Vered (yellow card) 65'; Chin 90+4'	Report	van Kanten (yellow card) 24'; Richards (yellow card) 73'	Stadium: TD Place Stadium; Attendance: 7,023; Referee: David Barrie

7 May 2016 6	Ottawa Fury	2 – 2	Minnesota United	Ottawa
14:00 EDT UTC−4	Brovsky 60' (o.g.); Obasi (yellow card) 74' de Jong 90+1'	Report	Ramirez 13'; Speas 75'; Ndjock (yellow card) 87'; Kallman (yellow card) 90'; Brovsky (yellow card) 90+3'	Stadium: TD Place Stadium; Attendance: 4,317; Referee: Pierre-Luc Lauzière

22 May 2016 7	Ottawa Fury	1 – 0	Jacksonville Armada	Ottawa
14:00 EDT UTC−4	Alves (yellow card) 53'; Obasi (yellow card) 59' de Jong 88'	Report	Keita (yellow card) 90+1'	Stadium: TD Place Stadium; Attendance: 5,550; Referee: Yusri Rudolf

27 May 2016 8	Ottawa Fury	1 – 2	Fort Lauderdale Strikers	Ottawa
19:30 EDT UTC−4	Bailey (yellow card) 12'; Steele (yellow card) 66'; Olivera (yellow card) 76'; Haworth 80' (pen.)	Report	Maicon Santos 8'; Núñez (yellow card) 40'; Gonzalez (yellow card) 63'; Gentile 65'; Fernandes (yellow card) 67'	Stadium: TD Place Stadium; Attendance: 5,034; Referee: Alain Ruch

4 June 2016 9	Tampa Bay Rowdies	2 – 1	Ottawa Fury	St. Petersburg, FL
19:30 EDT UTC−4	Hristov 20', 52', (yellow card) 60'; Alhassan (yellow card) 22'	Report	Haworth 49'; Alves (yellow card) 73'; Steele (yellow card) 82'	Stadium: Al Lang Stadium; Attendance: 6,078; Referee: Jaime Herrera

11 June 2016 10	Ottawa Fury	1 – 1	Rayo OKC	Ottawa
19:00 EDT UTC−4	Haworth 59'; Steele (yellow card) 88'	Report	Svantesson 2'; Danso (yellow card) 83'	Stadium: TD Place Stadium; Attendance: 7,847; Referee: Justin Tasev

=== NASL Fall season ===
==== Standings ====
Pos	Team	Pld	W	D	L	GF	GA	GD	Pts	Qualification
1	New York Cosmos (F)	22	14	5	3	44	21	+23	47	Playoffs
2	Indy Eleven	22	11	4	7	36	25	+11	37	
3	FC Edmonton	22	10	6	6	16	14	+2	36	
4	Rayo OKC	22	9	8	5	28	21	+7	35	
5	Miami FC	22	9	6	7	31	27	+4	33	
6	Fort Lauderdale Strikers	22	7	5	10	19	28	−9	26	
7	Carolina RailHawks	22	7	5	10	25	35	−10	26	
8	Minnesota United	22	6	7	9	25	25	0	25	
9	Puerto Rico	22	5	9	8	19	31	−12	24	
10	Tampa Bay Rowdies	22	5	8	9	29	32	−3	23	
11	Jacksonville Armada	22	5	8	9	25	35	−10	23	
12	Ottawa Fury	22	5	7	10	23	26	−3	22	

Source: NASL
Rules for classification: 1) points; 2) total goal differential; 3) total goals scored; 4) head-to-head record; 5) away goal differential; 6) away goals scored
(F) Fall season champion

==== Results summary ====
Overall								Home						Away					
Pld	W	D	L	GF	GA	GD	Pts	W	D	L	GF	GA	GD	W	D	L	GF	GA	GD
22	5	7	10	23	26	−3	22	3	4	4	13	11	+2	2	3	6	10	15	−5

Last updated: October 29, 2016.
Source: Match reports

==== Results by round ====
Round	1	2	3	4	5	6	7	8	9	10	11	12	13	14	15	16	17	18	19	20	21	22
Ground	A	H	A	A	H	H	A	H	A	H	H	H	A	A	A	H	A	H	H	A	A	H
Result	L	L	L	W	W	W	L	L	L	D	D	D	D	D	W	W	L	L	D	L	D	L
Position	11	12	12	11	7	6	7	7	10	9	8	7	8	8	7	5	6	5	8	10	10	12

Updated to match(es) played on October 29, 2016. Source: Match reports
A = Away; H = Home; W = Win; D = Draw; L = Loss

==== Match reports ====
2 July 2016 1	New York Cosmos	2 – 1	Ottawa Fury	Hempstead, NY
19:00 EDT UTC−4	Moffat 9' (pen.); Mkosana 45+1'; Ochieng (yellow card) 78'; Guenzatti (yellow card) 90+3'	Report	Peiser (red card) 4'; Bailey (yellow card) 33' de Guzman (yellow card) 36'; Haworth (yellow card) 65'; Paulo Jr. 90+1'	Stadium: James M. Shuart Stadium; Attendance: 3,518; Referee: Geoff Gamble

10 July 2016 2	Ottawa Fury	0 – 1	Rayo OKC	Ottawa
14:00 EDT UTC−4	Steele (yellow card) 18'; Timbó (yellow card) 90+1'	Report	DeBellis 8' (o.g.); Pecka (yellow card) 22'; Boateng (yellow card) 49'	Stadium: TD Place Stadium; Attendance: 6,308; Referee: Pierre-Luc Lauzière

17 July 2016 3	Edmonton	1 – 0	Ottawa Fury	Edmonton
16:00 EDT UTC−4	Diakité (yellow card) 54' (yellow-red card) 60'; Ledgerwood 82'	Report		Stadium: Clarke Stadium; Attendance: 2,861; Referee: David Barrie

23 July 2016 4	Jacksonville Armada	0 – 2	Ottawa Fury	Jacksonville
19:00 EDT UTC−4		Report	Stewart 37'; Haworth 60'; Eustáquio (yellow card) 86'	Stadium: Community First Park; Attendance: 3,411; Referee: Rubiel Vazquez

27 July 2016 5	Ottawa Fury	2 – 0	Carolina RailHawks	Ottawa
19:00 EDT UTC−4	Haworth 8'; Beckie 49' (o.g.); Bailey (yellow card) 68'	Report	Mensing (yellow card) 27'; Daly (yellow card) 83'	Stadium: TD Place Stadium; Attendance: 4,547; Referee: Kevin Terry Jr.

30 July 2016 6	Ottawa Fury	2 – 0	Tampa Bay Rowdies	Ottawa
19:00 EDT UTC−4	Roberts 2', (yellow card) 16'; Mkandawire 36' (o.g.); Tissot (yellow card) 64'	Report	Hristov (yellow card) 37'; King (yellow card) 70'	Stadium: TD Place Stadium; Attendance: 5,225; Referee: Juan Marquez

6 August 2016 7	Indy Eleven	1 – 0	Ottawa Fury	Indianapolis
19:30 EDT UTC−4	Falvey (yellow card) 36'; Youla (yellow card) 57'; Smart (yellow card) 85', (goal) 90+2'	Report	Bailey (yellow card) 36'	Stadium: Michael A. Carroll Stadium; Attendance: 7,760; Referee: Guido Gonzales Jr.

13 August 2016 8	Ottawa Fury	1 – 2	Jacksonville Armada	Ottawa
17:00 EDT UTC−4	Haworth 26'; Bailey (yellow card) 49'	Report	Keita 28', 87'	Stadium: TD Place Stadium; Attendance: 5,786; Referee: David Barrie

20 August 2016 9	Fort Lauderdale Strikers	3 – 1	Ottawa Fury	Lauderhill, FL
19:00 EDT UTC−4	Amauri 17', 77'; Alves 83' (o.g.)	Report	Haworth 28'; Alves (yellow card) 87'; Bailey (yellow card) 90+2'	Stadium: Central Broward Stadium; Referee: Marcos de Olivera

24 August 2016 10	Ottawa Fury	0 – 0	Miami	Ottawa
19:00 EDT UTC−4	Olivera (yellow card) 90'	Report		Stadium: TD Place Stadium; Attendance: 4,852; Referee: Pierre-Luc Lauzière

28 August 2016 11	Ottawa Fury	1 – 1	Indy Eleven	Ottawa
14:00 EDT UTC−4	Gentile (yellow card) 34'; Olivera (yellow card) 40'; Stewart 59'; Alves (yellow card) 77'	Report	Smart (yellow card) 54'; Ring 54'	Stadium: TD Place Stadium; Attendance: 6,139; Referee: Alain Ruch

2 September 2016 12	Ottawa Fury	2 – 2	Edmonton	Ottawa
19:00 EDT UTC−4	Stewart 2'; Eustáquio (yellow card) 23'; Tissot 36'; Timbó (yellow card) 54'; Alves (yellow card) 83'; Gentile (yellow card) 90'	Report	Di Biase (yellow card) 18'; Fordyce 42', 62'; Nicklaw (yellow card) 60'	Stadium: TD Place Stadium; Attendance: 4,956; Referee: Juan Márquez

7 September 2016 13	Puerto Rico	0 – 0	Ottawa Fury	Bayamón, PR
19:30 EDT UTC−4	Rudy (yellow card) 57'; Ramos (yellow card) 66'	Report	Bailey (yellow card) 37'; Timbó (yellow card) 51'; Roberts (yellow card) 90+4'	Stadium: Juan Ramón Loubriel Stadium; Attendance: 1,233; Referee: Javier Santos

10 September 2016 14	Carolina RailHawks	0 – 0	Ottawa Fury	Cary, NC
19:30 EDT UTC−4	Moses (yellow card) 52'	Report	Gentile (yellow card) 40'; Eustáquio (yellow card) 90+2'; Olivera (yellow card) 90+4' (red card) 90+5'	Stadium: WakeMed Soccer Park; Attendance: 4,094; Referee: Baboucarr Jallow

17 September 2016 15	Minnesota United	2 – 3	Ottawa Fury	Blaine, MN
20:00 EDT UTC−4	Calvano (yellow card) 9'; Watson 30'; Ramirez 44' (pen.); Brovsky (yellow card) 52'; Venegas (yellow card) 90+1'	Report	Gentile 35'; Williams 84'; Mwanga 88'	Stadium: National Sports Center; Attendance: 9,388; Referee: David Gantar

24 September 2016 16	Ottawa Fury	3 – 1	Minnesota United	Ottawa
19:00 EDT UTC−4	Edward (yellow card) 45+2'; Gentile 56'; Williams 82'; Rozeboom 86'	Report	Watson 20', (yellow card) 57'; Speas (yellow card) 51'	Stadium: TD Place Stadium; Attendance: 6,274; Referee: Yusri Rudolf

28 September 2016 17	Miami	2 – 1	Ottawa Fury	Miami
20:00 EDT UTC−4	Lahoud 35'; Farfán (yellow card) 62'; Rennella (yellow card) 69', (goal) 90+5'	Report	Gentile 44'; Dixon (yellow card) 66'	Stadium: FIU Stadium; Attendance: 3,116; Referee: Nima Saghafi

2 October 2016 18	Ottawa Fury	1 – 2	Puerto Rico	Ottawa
14:00 EDT UTC−4	Williams 15'	Report	Culbertson 27', (yellow card) 78'; Dawson (red card) 71'; Rivera 77'; Spangenberg (yellow card) 88'	Stadium: TD Place Stadium; Attendance: 4,556; Referee: Robert Schaap

9 October 2016 19	Ottawa Fury	1 – 1	New York Cosmos	Ottawa
14:00 EDT UTC−4	Williams 54'; Haworth (yellow card) 57'; Eustáquio (yellow card) 77'	Report	Moffat (yellow card) 56'; Arango 79'; Arrieta (yellow card) 83'	Stadium: TD Place Stadium; Attendance: 4,400; Referee: Silviu Petrescu

16 October 2016 20	Rayo OKC	3 – 1	Ottawa Fury	Yukon, OK
19:00 EDT UTC−4	Menjivar (yellow card) 26' van Schaik (yellow card) 32'; Michel 36', 84'; Forbes 61'; Boateng (yellow card) 72'	Report	Gentile 28'; Obasi (yellow card) 46'; Haworth (yellow card) 90+3'	Stadium: Miller Stadium; Attendance: 987; Referee: Rosendo Mendoza

22 October 2016 21	Tampa Bay Rowdies	1 – 1	Ottawa Fury	St. Petersburg, FL
19:30 EDT UTC−4	King (red card) 25'; Pickens (yellow card) 45+11'; Hristov 48', (yellow card) 90+3' (yellow-red card) 90+5'	Report	Tissot 27'; Obasi (yellow card) 43'; Edward (yellow card) 45+3' (yellow-red card) 89'; Alves (yellow card) 70'	Stadium: Al Lang Stadium; Attendance: 7,641; Referee: Mark Kadlecik

29 October 2016 22	Ottawa Fury	0 – 1	Fort Lauderdale Strikers	Ottawa
14:00 EDT UTC−4	Alves (yellow card) 36'	Report	Moura (yellow card) 42'; Pineda (yellow card) 48'; Amauri 66'; Bruno (yellow card) 90+4'	Stadium: TD Place Stadium; Attendance: 4,903; Referee: Mathieu Bourdeau

=== NASL Combined Season ===
==== Standings ====
Pos	Team	Pld	W	D	L	GF	GA	GD	Pts	Qualification
1	New York Cosmos (C, X)	32	20	5	7	59	29	+30	65	Championship qualifiers
2	Indy Eleven	32	15	10	7	51	33	+18	55	Championship qualifiers
3	FC Edmonton	32	15	8	9	25	21	+4	53	Championship qualifiers
4	Rayo OKC	32	12	11	9	39	33	+6	47	Championship qualifiers
5	Minnesota United	32	11	8	13	41	37	+4	41	
6	Fort Lauderdale Strikers	32	11	8	13	31	40	−9	41	
7	Miami FC	32	10	10	12	38	42	−4	40	
8	Carolina RailHawks	32	11	7	14	36	48	−12	40	
9	Tampa Bay Rowdies	32	9	12	11	40	41	−1	39	
10	Ottawa Fury	32	7	10	15	32	40	−8	31	
11	Jacksonville Armada	32	6	12	14	30	46	−16	30	
12	Puerto Rico FC	22	5	9	8	19	31	−12	24	

Source: NASL
Rules for classification: 1) points; 2) total goal differential; 3) total goals scored; 4) head-to-head record; 5) away goal differential; 6) away goals scored
(C) Champions; (X) Regular season champion

==== Results summary ====
Overall								Home						Away					
Pld	W	D	L	GF	GA	GD	Pts	W	D	L	GF	GA	GD	W	D	L	GF	GA	GD
32	7	10	15	32	40	−8	31	5	6	5	20	16	+4	2	4	10	12	24	−12

Last updated: October 29, 2016.
Source: Match reports

==== Results by round ====
Round	1	2	3	4	5	6	7	8	9	10	11	12	13	14	15	16	17	18	19	20	21	22	23	24	25	26	27	28	29	30	31	32
Ground	A	A	A	A	H	H	H	H	A	H	A	H	A	A	H	H	A	H	A	H	H	H	A	A	A	H	A	H	H	A	A	H
Result	L	D	L	L	W	D	W	L	L	D	L	L	L	W	W	W	L	L	L	D	D	D	D	D	W	W	L	L	D	L	D	L
Position	12	10	11	11	9	9	9	9	9	9	9	10	11	9	9	9	10	9	10	10	10	10	10	10	10	10	10	10	10	10	10	10

Updated to match(es) played on October 29, 2016. Source: Match reports
A = Away; H = Home; W = Win; D = Draw; L = Loss

=== Canadian Championship ===
==== Preliminary round ====
11 May 2016 1	Edmonton	0 – 3	Ottawa Fury	Edmonton
21:00 EDT UTC−4	Ledgerwood (yellow card) 60'; Fordyce (yellow card) 75'	Report	Timbó 13'; Bailey (yellow card) 31'; Haworth 69'; Vered 74'; Olivera (yellow card) 86'	Stadium: Clarke Stadium; Attendance: 3,000; Referee: Alain Ruch

18 May 2016 2	Ottawa Fury	0 – 2 (3 – 2 agg.)	Edmonton	Ottawa
19:30 EDT UTC−4	Steele (yellow card) 54'; Bailey (yellow card) 55'; Timbó (yellow card) 90+1'	Report	Diakité (yellow card) 16'; Corea 26'; Watson (yellow card) 38'; Eckersley 45'	Stadium: TD Place Stadium; Attendance: 3,946; Referee: Mathieu Bourdeau

==== Semi-finals ====
1 June 2016 1	Ottawa Fury	2 – 0	Vancouver Whitecaps	Ottawa
19:30 EDT UTC−4	Steele 3'; Obasi (yellow card) 16'; Paulo Jr. 41'; Haworth (yellow card) 63'; Eustáquio (yellow card) 90'	Report		Stadium: TD Place Stadium; Attendance: 9,057; Referee: Yusri Rudolf

8 June 2016 2	Vancouver Whitecaps	3 – 0 (3 – 2 agg.)	Ottawa Fury	Vancouver
22:00 EDT UTC−4	Morales 3' (pen.); Mezquida 20'; Rivero 52'; Parker (yellow card) 67'	Report	Alves (yellow card) 2' de Guzman (yellow card) 73'	Stadium: BC Place; Attendance: 17,863; Referee: Geoff Gamble

== Squad statistics ==
As of match played 29 October 2016

=== Appearances and goals ===
No.	Pos	Nat	Player	Total		NASL		Canadian Championship	
No.	Pos	Nat	Player	Apps	Goals	Apps	Goals	Apps	Goals
1	GK	(France) FRA	Romuald Peiser	31	0	29	0	2	0
2	DF	(United States) USA	Rich Balchan	4	0	3	0	1	0
3	DF	(Canada) CAN	Eddie Edward	19	0	18+1	0	0	0
4	MF	(Canada) CAN	Dario Conte	1	0	0+1	0	0	0
6	MF	(Canada) CAN	Julian de Guzman	12	0	10+1	0	0+1	0
7	MF	(England) ENG	Ryan Williams	18	4	14+4	4	0	0
8	MF	(England) ENG	James Bailey	33	0	25+4	0	4	0
9	MF	(Uruguay) URU	Bryan Olivera	22	0	10+9	0	1+2	0
10	FW	(Argentina) ARG	Gerardo Bruna	6	0	3+3	0	0	0
11	MF	(Canada) CAN	Mozzi Gyorio	4	0	1+1	0	1+1	0
14	DF	(England) ENG	Onua Obasi	19	0	11+4	0	4	0
16	FW	(Northern Ireland) NIR	Thomas Stewart	17	3	10+7	3	0	0
17	FW	(Canada) CAN	Carl Haworth	31	8	24+3	7	4	1
18	DF	(Canada) CAN	Mallan Roberts	22	1	17+5	1	0	0
19	DF	(Canada) CAN	Kyle Porter	18	0	11+4	0	1+2	0
20	MF	(Canada) CAN	Mauro Eustáquio	18	0	8+9	0	0+1	0
22	MF	(Canada) CAN	Jamar Dixon	12	0	10+2	0	0	0
24	GK	(Canada) CAN	Marcel DeBellis	6	0	3+1	0	2	0
25	MF	(United States) USA	Lance Rozeboom	35	1	30+1	1	4	0
33	DF	(Brazil) BRA	Rafael Alves	35	0	30+1	0	4	0
51	MF	(Canada) CAN	Maxim Tissot	19	2	19	2	0	0
77	DF	(Brazil) BRA	Fernando Timbó	23	2	18+1	1	4	1
92	FW	(United States) USA	Giuseppe Gentile	16	4	9+7	4	0	0
99	FW	(Democratic Republic of the Congo) COD	Danny Mwanga	8	1	2+6	1	0	0
Players who appeared for Ottawa but left during the season:
7	FW	(Brazil) BRA	Paulo Jr.	14	2	9+1	1	3+1	1
15	FW	(Jamaica) JAM	Dennis Chin	17	1	6+9	1	1+1	0
22	MF	(Northern Ireland) NIR	Jonny Steele	16	1	11+1	0	4	1
23	FW	(Israel) ISR	Idan Vered	13	2	7+3	1	1+2	1
30	MF	(Canada) CAN	Marcel de Jong	9	2	5+1	2	3	0

=== Goal scorers ===
Rnk	Pos	No.	Nat	Name	NASL	Canadian Championship	Total
1	FW	17	(Canada)	Carl Haworth	7	1	8
2	MF	7	(England)	Ryan Williams	4	0	4
2	FW	92	(United States)	Giuseppe Gentile	4	0	4
4	FW	16	(Northern Ireland)	Thomas Stewart	3	0	3
5	MF	30	(Canada)	Marcel de Jong	2	0	2
5	MF	51	(Canada)	Maxim Tissot	2	0	2
5	FW	7	(Brazil)	Paulo Jr.	1	1	2
5	FW	23	(Israel)	Idan Vered	1	1	2
5	DF	77	(Brazil)	Fernando Timbó	1	1	2
10	FW	15	(Jamaica)	Dennis Chin	1	0	1
10	DF	18	(Canada)	Mallan Roberts	1	0	1
10	MF	25	(United States)	Lance Rozeboom	1	0	1
10	FW	99	(Democratic Republic of the Congo)	Danny Mwanga	1	0	1
10	MF	22	(Northern Ireland)	Jonny Steele	0	1	1
Own goal					3	0	3
Total					32	5	37

=== Disciplinary ===
Number	Nation	Position	Name	NASL		Canadian Championship		Total	
Number	Nation	Position	Name	Yellow card	Red card	Yellow card	Red card	Yellow card	Red card
1	(France)	GK	Romuald Peiser	0	1	0	0	0	1
3	(Canada)	DF	Eddie Edward	2	1	0	0	2	1
6	(Canada)	MF	Julian de Guzman	1	0	1	0	2	0
8	(England)	MF	James Bailey	8	0	2	0	10	0
9	(Uruguay)	MF	Bryan Olivera	4	1	1	0	5	1
10	(Argentina)	FW	Gerardo Bruna	1	0	0	0	1	0
14	(England)	DF	Onua Obasi	4	0	1	0	5	0
15	(Jamaica)	FW	Dennis Chin	1	0	0	0	1	0
17	(Canada)	FW	Carl Haworth	3	0	1	0	4	0
18	(Canada)	DF	Mallan Roberts	2	0	0	0	2	0
20	(Canada)	MF	Mauro Eustáquio	4	0	1	0	5	0
22	(Canada)	MF	Jamar Dixon	1	0	0	0	1	0
22	(Northern Ireland)	MF	Jonny Steele	5	0	1	0	6	0
23	(Israel)	FW	Idan Vered	1	0	0	0	1	0
25	(United States)	MF	Lance Rozeboom	1	0	0	0	1	0
30	(Canada)	MF	Marcel de Jong	1	0	0	0	1	0
33	(Brazil)	DF	Rafael Alves	7	0	1	0	8	0
51	(Canada)	MF	Maxim Tissot	1	0	0	0	1	0
77	(Brazil)	DF	Fernando Timbó	4	0	1	0	5	0
92	(United States)	FW	Giuseppe Gentile	3	0	0	0	3	0
			TOTALS	54	3	10	0	64	3

== Awards ==
=== Player ===
No.	Player	Award	Month	Source
1	(France) Romuald Peiser	NASL Play of the Week (Week 22)	September	
