= Soccer Bowl 2015 =

Soccer match

- Event: Soccer Bowl
New York Cosmos	Ottawa Fury
(United States)	(Canada)
3	2
- Date: November 15, 2015
- Venue: Shuart Stadium, Hempstead, New York
- Man of the Match: Gastón Cellerino (NYC)
- Referee: Alan Kelly
- Attendance: 10,166 (NASL Playoff Record)
- Weather: Clear skies 55 °F (13 °C)

The NASL Championship Final 2015 was the North American Soccer League's postseason championship match of the 2015 season which determined the NASL Champion.

== Background ==
The New York Cosmos became the first club to earn a place in the Soccer Bowl Championship after securing the 2015 Spring Championship with a 3–3 draw at home against Jacksonville on June 13. The Fall Championship would be clinched by the Ottawa Fury on October 21 with a comeback 3–1 away win, also against the Armada. This would be Fury's first championship as a professional club and would make them the first Canadian club to appear in the Soccer Bowl playoffs since 2011. The final two playoff spots would be taken by Minnesota United and the Fort Lauderdale Strikers.

The race for the North American Supporters' Trophy would quickly boil down to three clubs: the Cosmos, the Fury and Minnesota United. These clubs pulled away from the rest of the league during the Fall season, and would repeatedly switch positions as the season came to a close. Ultimately it came down to the last matchday, as New York took advantage of a 1–1 Ottawa away draw against the Atlanta Silverbacks to win the league by an incredibly close margin. The Cosmos defeated the Tampa Bay Rowdies 2–0, giving them and the Fury an identical record of 15–11–4, as well as an identical goal differential of +19. The Cosmos would secure the league title on goals for, of which they had 49 compared to Ottawa's 42. This also secured New York the top seed in the championship, matching Ottawa up against Minnesota in the other semi-final while the Cosmos played the Strikers, who would finish the season twelve points behind the Loons.

The Strikers, along with many other clubs including Tampa Bay, Atlanta and Edmonton would remain in close competition for the last playoff spot towards the end of the season. On the final matchday, only Fort Lauderdale and Tampa were left in contention, with the Rowdies leading the race by a single point. Tampa lost their final match 2–0 to in New York on October 31 and following day the Strikers capitalized on the opportunity, defeating the Armada 1–0 in Jacksonville.

== Path to the final ==
=== Semi-final #1 ===
The Strikers and Cosmos met three times during the 2015 season, all in the NASL. The first two matches were won by New York by scores of 1–0 and 2–0 respectively. The last match played between the clubs was a 3–3 draw on August 6. New York had never lost a match against the Strikers in the NASL's modern era going into the semi-final, with a total of six wins and two draws against the Florida club.

Strikers winger PC scored the first goal of the match off a counterattack which stemmed from an error by Cosmos defender Hunter Freeman in the 16th minute. In the 37th minute however a Marcos Senna free kick was saved but not cleared by Fort Lauderdale keeper David Meves and Cosmos forward Gastón Cellerino tapped home the rebound at close range to tie the match before half time. In the 61st minute Cosmos midfielder Danny Szetela sent a ball through for Raúl, who found himself all alone just inside the 18-yard box and finished easily to secure what would end up being the game winner for the Cosmos.

November 7, 2015
14:00 EST (UTC−5)

New York Cosmos (United States)	2–1	(United States) Fort Lauderdale Strikers
Cellerino 37', (yellow card) 74'; Senna (yellow card) 58'; Raúl 61'; Szetela (yellow card) 72'	Report; Report	PC 16'; Thomas (yellow card) 33'

MCU Park, Brooklyn
Attendance: 5,061
Referee: Sorin Stoica

=== Semi-final #2 ===
The Fury and the Loons met three times during the NASL season, with each club winning a match by a goal (1–0 for Ottawa on April 18 and 2–1 for United on August 15) and the other match resulting in a 1–1 draw (July 11). The semi-final was greatly anticipated for being the matchup between the league's best offence (Minnesota; 54 goals for, 1.80 GFA) and its best defense (Ottawa; 23 goals against, 0.77 GAA).

The match got off to a very lively start, with Fury forward Tom Heinemann taking a close-range header off a Ryan Richter cross, demanding a brilliant save from Minnesota 'keeper Sammy Ndjock in the 4th minute. Three minutes later, Minnesota forward Christian Ramirez earned a penalty off a challenge by Colin Falvey just inside the Fury box. Goalkeeper Romuald Peiser guessed correctly, but Ramirez found the top right corner of the net to open the scoring in the 7th minute. Ottawa pushed back as the half wore on, earning the majority of scoring opportunities but the score remained 1–0 United at the end of the half. The Fury broke through shortly after the restart as Heinemann found space just inside the Minnesota box and fired a low shot which Ndjock was able to get a hand to, but could not keep out. Ottawa again had most of the scoring chances in the second half, including a shot by Andrew Wiedeman which went off the left-hand post and out in the 62nd minute. The Loons also had an excellent scoring chance in the 80th minute as Christian Ramirez nearly converted a cross from Justin Davis and was stopped only by Ottawa defender Mason Trafford. The score would remain level at the end of 90 minutes and the match would have to be decided in extra time. After the start of the second half of extra time, Heinemann would again find the back of the net in the 108th minute after receiving a long ball forward by Fury midfielder Siniša Ubiparipović. In the final twelve minutes Minnesota pressed for the equaliser, demanding multiple saves from Peiser but were unable to send the match to penalties.

November 8, 2015
15:00 EST (UTC−5)

Ottawa Fury (Canada)	2–1 (a.e.t.)	(United States) Minnesota United
Heinemann (yellow card) 9', (goal) 57', 108'; Trafford (yellow card) 104'	Report; Report	Tiago (yellow card) 2'; Ramirez 7' (pen.); Ibson (yellow card) 45'; Mendes (yellow card) 45+'; Vicentini (yellow card) 100'; Jordan (yellow card) 120+'

TD Place Stadium, Ottawa
Attendance: 9,346
Referee: Mathieu Bordeau

== Match ==
=== Summary ===
The Cosmos and the Fury met three times during the 2015 NASL season. The first match was won 1–0 by New York at MCU Park in Brooklyn on May 2, the second was a scoreless draw at Lansdowne Park in Ottawa on August 26 and the final match was a shock 4–1 win for the Fury at Shuart Stadium on Long Island on September 22.

=== Details ===
November 15, 2015
17:00 EST (UTC−5)

New York Cosmos (United States)	3–2	(Canada) Ottawa Fury
Cellerino 8', 72', 85'	Report; Report; Report	Heinemann 70', 90+2'

Shuart Stadium, Hempstead, New York
Attendance: 10,166
Referee: Alan Kelly

New York Cosmos	Ottawa Fury

2015 NASL Champions: New York Cosmos

New York Cosmos:
GK	1	(United States) Jimmy Maurer	(yellow card) 41'
DF	2	(United States) Hunter Freeman
DF	4	(United States) Carlos Mendes (c)
DF	6	(Brazil) Rovérsio
DF	17	(Spain) Ayoze
MF	13	(Uruguay) Sebastián Guenzatti	(yellow card) 60'	(substituted off) 90+3'
MF	14	(United States) Danny Szetela
MF	19	(Spain) Marcos Senna
MF	20	(Colombia) Wálter Restrepo
FW	7	(Spain) Raúl
FW	8	(Argentina) Gastón Cellerino	(yellow card) 7'	(substituted off) 88'
Substitutes:
GK	12	(United States) Kyle Zobeck
DF	3	(United States) Hunter Gorskie
DF	5	(Paraguay) Samuel Cáceres
MF	11	(El Salvador) Andrés Flores
MF	15	(Spain) Ruben Bover
MF	22	(Brazil) Leo Fernandes		(substituted on) 90+3'
FW	77	(Zimbabwe) Lucky Mkosana		(substituted on) 88'
Manager: (Venezuela) Giovanni Savarese

Ottawa Fury:
GK	1	(France) Romuald Peiser
DF	2	(United States) Ryan Richter
DF	3	(Canada) Mason Trafford	(red card) 68'
DF	32	(Republic of Ireland) Colin Falvey	(yellow card) 76'
DF	33	(Brazil) Rafael Alves
MF	6	(Republic of Ireland) Richie Ryan (c)	(yellow card) 76'
MF	10	(Bosnia and Herzegovina) Siniša Ubiparipović		(substituted off) 72'
MF	20	(Canada) Mauro Eustáquio		(substituted off) 77'
FW	7	(Brazil) Paulo Jr.
FW	9	(United States) Tom Heinemann
FW	23	(United States) Andrew Wiedeman		(substituted off) 72'
Substitutes:
GK	24	(Canada) Marcel DeBellis
DF	4	(Canada) Drew Beckie
MF	5	(Canada) Jérémy Gagnon-Laparé		(substituted on) 72'
FW	11	(Brazil) Oliver		(substituted on) 72'
FW	14	(United States) Aly Hassan
FW	17	(Canada) Carl Haworth
FW	77	(Turkey) Uğur Albayrak		(substituted on) 77'
Manager: (Canada) Marc Dos Santos

Man of the Match: Gastón Cellerino (New York Cosmos)

MATCH OFFICIALS

- Assistant referees:
  - Oscar Mitchell-Carvalho
  - Kyle Atkins
- Fourth official: Mark Kadlecik

=== Statistics ===
Overall	New York	Ottawa
Goals scored	3	2
Total shots	15	8
Shots on target	4	4
Ball possession	50%	50%
Corner kicks	10	5
Fouls committed	16	10
Offsides	2	1
Saves	1	1
Yellow cards	3	2
Red cards	0	1

== See also ==
- 2015 in American soccer
- 2015 in Canadian soccer
- 2015 North American Soccer League season
