= Mauro Eustáquio =

Portuguese-born Canadian soccer player

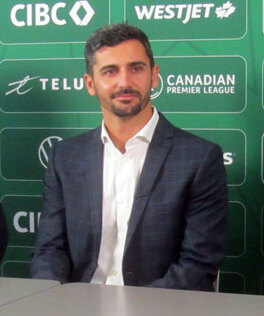
- Eustáquio in 2024

Personal information
- Full name: Mauro Antunes Eustáquio
- Date of birth: 10 February 1993 (age 33)
- Place of birth: Nazaré, Portugal
- Height: 1.83 m (6 ft 0 in)
- Position: Midfielder

Youth career
- Leamington MS
- 2004–2010: Nazarenos
- 2010–2012: União Leiria

Senior career*
Years	Team	Apps	(Gls)
2012–2013	Sporting Pombal	23	(0)
2013–2014	Nazarenos	13	(3)
2014–2016	Ottawa Fury	45	(2)
2015	→ Ottawa Fury Academy (loan)	1	(0)
2017	FC Edmonton	18	(1)
2018	Penn FC	6	(0)
2019	Cavalry FC	10	(0)
2020–2021	Caldas	13	(1)
Total		129	(7)

International career
2012–2013	Canada U20	2	(1)
2015	Canada U23	4	(0)

Managerial career
- 2022–2024: York United (assistant)
- 2024: York United (interim)
- 2025–2026: Inter Toronto FC (Note: York United re-branded as Inter Toronto FC ahead of the 2026 season)
- * Club domestic league appearances and goals

Mauro Antunes Eustáquio (born 10 February 1993) is a Canadian soccer coach and former professional player who played as a midfielder. Born in Portugal, he represented Canada at youth level.

== Early life ==
Eustáquio was born in Nazaré, Leiria District, and moved to Leamington, Ontario when he was 13 months old. He began playing youth soccer with Leamington Minor Soccer. He returned to Portugal at the age of 11, and spent time in the youth academies of Grupo Desportivo Os Nazarenos and U.D. Leiria.

Eustáquio started his senior career in 2012, with fourth division club Sporting Clube de Pombal.

== Playing career ==
=== Ottawa Fury ===
On 20 December 2013, Eustáquio signed with North American Soccer League club Ottawa Fury FC. He made his debut on 2 August 2014 as a replacement starter for injured captain Richie Ryan in a 2–1 away loss against Minnesota United FC, and finished the season with eight appearances.

Eustáquio featured significantly the following campaign, playing 23 times across all competitions including twice in the team's run in the Soccer Bowl. He scored his first goal for them on 8 August 2015 in a 4–1 win over the Indy Eleven on 8 August 2015, earning a place on the league's Team of the Week; he added a second on 18 October, helping the hosts defeat the San Antonio Scorpions 1–0, and later in the year he agreed to a contract extension.

Eustáquio nearly went on loan to FC Edmonton during the 2016 season in exchange for Mallan Roberts, however the move fell through. In December, the Fury announced that the former would not return to the club as it was due to move to the United Soccer League.

=== FC Edmonton ===
On 14 February 2017, Eustáquio joined FC Edmonton. On 24 November, after the club ceased operations, he left.

=== Penn FC ===
In February 2018, Eustáquio signed with Penn FC of the USL. In June, he suffered a knee injury that would sideline him for the rest of the season.

=== Cavalry FC ===
On 20 March 2019, Eustáquio moved to the Canadian Premier League after agreeing to a contract at Cavalry FC. He played ten league matches for the side in the inaugural campaign of the competition.

=== Caldas ===
Eustáquio joined Caldas S.C. of the Portuguese third tier on 21 July 2020. He announced his retirement on 7 April 2021 at the age of 28.

== Coaching career ==
Immediately after his retirement, Eustáquio joined the staff of Calgary Foothills FC as development phase boys manager. In February 2022, he was named assistant at Canadian top-flight club York United FC.

Eustáquio was appointed interim head coach of York United on 21 May 2024 following the firing of Martin Nash, remaining in the role until Benjamín Mora's arrival in June; subsequently, he returned to his job as an assistant. In September, he was invited to join the Canada national team as assistant for a pair of friendlies.

In November 2024, York United announced Eustáquio as their new head coach for the 2025 season, becoming the youngest ever at the helm of a first division side in North America as well as the first former player in the league to earn such a position. Prior to the following campaign, the team was renamed Inter Toronto FC, and he left at its closure.

== Personal life ==
Eustáquio's younger brother, Stephen, is also a soccer player. A midfielder as well, he represented Portugal at under-21 level and the Canadian senior team.

Their mother, Esmeralda, died from brain cancer in April 2023, while their father Armando died of a heart attack one year later.

== Career statistics ==
Club	League	Season	League		Playoffs		National Cup		Total	
Club	League	Season	Apps	Goals	Apps	Goals	Apps	Goals	Apps	Goals
Ottawa Fury	NASL	2014	8	0	0	0	—	—	8	0
Ottawa Fury	NASL	2015	20	2	2	0	1	0	23	2
Ottawa Fury	NASL	2016	17	0	0	0	1	0	18	0
Ottawa Fury	Total		45	2	2	0	2	0	49	2
Ottawa Fury Academy	PLSQ	2015	1	0	—		—		1	0
FC Edmonton	NASL	2017	18	1	0	0	0	0	18	1
Penn FC	USL	2018	7	0	0	0	0	0	7	0
Cavalry FC	Canadian Premier League	2019	10	0	0	0	5	0	15	0
Caldas	Campeonato de Portugal	2020–21	13	1	0	0	1	0	14	1
Career total			94	4	2	0	8	0	104	4

== Honours ==
Ottawa Fury

- North American Soccer League: 2015 Fall Championship
