= Ottawa Fury =

Ottawa Fury may refer to:

- Ottawa Fury FC (2014–2019), a defunct professional soccer team in the NASL and USL Championship
- Ottawa Fury SC (2005–2013), a defunct soccer team in the USL Premier Development League
- Ottawa Fury (women) (2000–2014), a defunct women's soccer team in the USL W-League
- Ottawa Fury FC Academy, a defunct soccer academy and men's semi-professional team in the PLSQ
