= Dario Conte =

Canadian soccer midfielder

Personal information
- Full name: Dario Conte
- Date of birth: November 2, 1997 (age 29)
- Place of birth: Montreal, Quebec, Canada
- Height: 1.73 m (5 ft 8 in)
- Position: Midfielder

Youth career
- 2002: Étoiles de L'Est
- 2003–2014: Ottawa South United
- 2015: Vancouver Whitecaps FC
- 2015–2016: Ottawa Fury

College career
Years	Team	Apps	(Gls)
2017–2019	Carleton	39	(9)

Senior career*
Years	Team	Apps	(Gls)
2015–2016	Ottawa Fury FC Academy	18	(5)
2016	Ottawa Fury	1	(0)
2017–2018	Ottawa South United	9	(4)
2019	Reading United	3	(0)
2020	Ottawa South United	6	(0)
- * Club domestic league appearances and goals as of October 5, 2019

Dario Conte (born November 2, 1997) is a Canadian soccer midfielder.

== Playing career ==
=== Youth ===
Conte began playing soccer at the age of four with AS Laval before moving to Ottawa the following year. In Ottawa, he played for Ottawa South United until the age of 17. He went on trial for several clubs, including Crewe Alexandra, Peterborough United and Blackpool before finally joining the Vancouver Whitecaps U18 Academy after a successful trial in February 2015. He was then released by the Whitecaps at the end of the season and returned to Ottawa to join Ottawa Fury Academy.

=== Ottawa Fury ===
On 11 June 2016, Conte made his senior debut for the Fury in a 1–1 draw versus Rayo OKC, coming on as a substitute for captain Julian de Guzman.

=== OSU Force ===
In 2017, Conte joined the senior team of his youth club, Ottawa South United, in League1 Ontario. That season, he made three appearances and scored one goal. The following season Conte rejoined OSU, scoring three goals in six appearances.

=== Reading United ===
In summer 2019, Conte played for American USL League Two side Reading United AC and made three appearances that season.

=== Ottawa South United ===
In 2020, he returned to Ottawa South United, playing for them in the Première Ligue de soccer du Québec.

== International career ==
Conte was one of six Ottawa Fury Academy players called to a Canadian U20 identification camp in Laval in September 2015.

== Career statistics ==
As of September 19, 2020

Club statistics
Club	Season	League			Playoffs		Domestic Cup		League Cup		Total	
Club	Season	Division	Apps	Goals	Apps	Goals	Apps	Goals	Apps	Goals	Apps	Goals
Ottawa Fury FC Academy	2015	Première Ligue de soccer du Québec	9	3	—		—		1	0	10	3
Ottawa Fury FC Academy	2016	Première Ligue de soccer du Québec	9	2	—		—		2	0	11	2
Ottawa Fury FC	2016	North American Soccer League	1	0	—		0	0	—		1	0
Ottawa South United	2017	League1 Ontario	3	1	—		—		?	?	3	1
Ottawa South United	2018	League1 Ontario	6	3	—		—		0	0	6	3
Reading United AC	2019	USL League Two	3	0	0	0	0	0	—		3	0
Ottawa South United	2020	Première Ligue de soccer du Québec	6	0	—		—		—		6	0
Career total			37	9	0	0	0	0	3	0	40	9
