= Marcel DeBellis =

Canadian soccer player

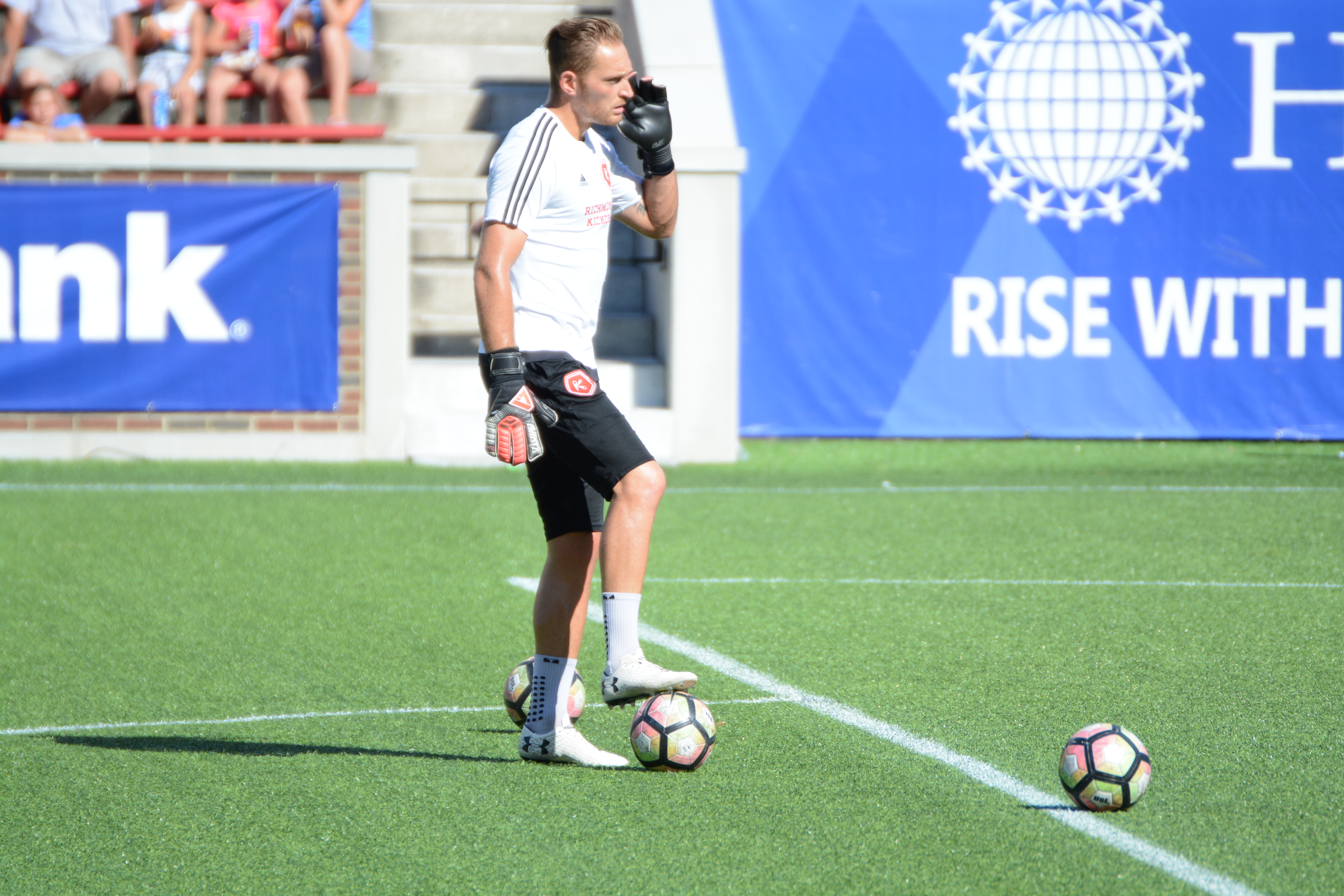
- DeBellis training with the Richmond Kickers in 2017

Personal information
- Full name: Marcel DeBellis
- Date of birth: April 17, 1991 (age 35)
- Place of birth: Oakville, Ontario, Canada
- Height: 1.91 m (6 ft 3 in)
- Position: Goalkeeper

Youth career
- Erin Mills
- 2008–2010: Benfica

Senior career*
Years	Team	Apps	(Gls)
2010–2011	Trento		
2011–2012	Vicenza		
2012–2013	Bellaria	0	(0)
2013	Ascoli	0	(0)
2014–2016	Ottawa Fury	5	(0)
2015	→ Ottawa Fury Academy (loan)	1	(0)
2017	Richmond Kickers	2	(0)
Total		7	(0)
- * Club domestic league appearances and goals

Marcel DeBellis (born 17 April 1991) is a Canadian former professional soccer player who played as a goalkeeper. He is currently the Category Manager of Beler Holdings Inc (BHI).

== Professional ==
=== Ottawa Fury ===
DeBellis was the first goalkeeper signing for the Ottawa Fury in January 2014. After spending the majority of his first two years in Ottawa as a backup to Romuald Peiser, he made his professional debut in October 2015 against the Atlanta Silverbacks. In July 2016, DeBellis made his first start of the 2016 NASL season against Rayo OKC after Peiser picked up a red card in the previous week's game against the New York Cosmos. In December 2016, the Fury announced that de Bellis would not return to the team as the club moved to USL in 2017. He played a match for their academy team in the third-tier Première Ligue de soccer du Québec.

=== Richmond Kickers ===
DeBellis signed with the Richmond Kickers of the United Soccer League for the 2017 season.

== Career statistics ==
As of match played October 14, 2017

Club	League	Season	League		Playoffs		Domestic Cup		Total	
Club	League	Season	Apps	Goals	Apps	Goals	Apps	Goals	Apps	Goals
Ottawa Fury	NASL	2014	0	0	0	0	0	0	0	0
Ottawa Fury	NASL	2015	1	0	0	0	0	0	1	0
Ottawa Fury	NASL	2016	4	0	0	0	2	0	6	0
Ottawa Fury	Total		5	0	0	0	2	0	7	0
Ottawa Fury Academy	PLSQ	2015	1	0	-		-		1	0
Richmond Kickers	USL	2017	2	0	0	0	1	0	3	0
Career total			8	0	0	0	3	0	11	0
