= Jeff Addai =

Canadian soccer player (born 1993)

Personal information
- Full name: Jeffrey Kwabena Addai
- Date of birth: May 11, 1993 (age 33)
- Place of birth: Ottawa, Ontario, Canada
- Height: 1.78 m (5 ft 10 in)
- Position: Midfielder

Youth career
- 2005–2011: Ottawa South United

College career
Years	Team	Apps	(Gls)
2011–2012	Spring Arbor Cougars		
2013–2014	South Carolina Gamecocks	19	(1)

Senior career*
Years	Team	Apps	(Gls)
2013	Michigan Bucks	6	(0)
2014	K-W United	11	(1)
2015	Ottawa Fury Academy	10	(1)
2016–2017	VfR Mannheim	17	(0)
2018	1º de Dezembro	0	(0)
2019	Tulsa Roughnecks	23	(0)
2020	VPS	11	(1)
2021–2022	PEPO	41	(3)
2023–	Marisca Mersch	1	(0)
- * Club domestic league appearances and goals as of November 16, 2023

Jeffrey Kwabena Addai (born May 11, 1993) is a former Canadian professional soccer player who played as a midfielder for Luxembourgish club Marisca Mersch.

== Career ==
=== Tulsa Roughnecks ===
After playing for both Ottawa Fury and VfR Mannheim, Addai would sign with USL Championship club Tulsa Roughnecks for the 2019 season. Addai was subsequently named vice captain of the club for the 2019 season.

=== VPS ===
After one year with Tulsa, Addai signed with Finnish Ykkönen club Vaasan Palloseura on a three-year contract.

=== Marisca Mersch ===
In 2023, Addai joined Luxembourg National Division club Marisca Mersch.

== Personal life ==
After retiring from playing, he started as the CEO of One Pro Sports Management, a sports agency he co-founded with his brother Godwin Addai.
