= Andrew MacRae (soccer) =

Canadian soccer player

Personal information
- Full name: Andrew MacRae
- Date of birth: August 24, 1990 (age 36)
- Place of birth: Coldbrook, Nova Scotia, Canada
- Height: 1.85 m (6 ft 1 in)
- Position: Goalkeeper

Youth career
- Valley United

College career
Years	Team	Apps	(Gls)
2014	Acadia Axemen	13	(0)

Senior career*
Years	Team	Apps	(Gls)
2016	Ottawa Fury Academy	6	(0)
2016–2017	Ottawa Fury	0	(0)
2018	Larne	4	(0)
2019–2020	FC Tulsa	1	(0)
- * Club domestic league appearances and goals as of October 6, 2020

Andrew MacRae (born August 24, 1990) is a Canadian professional soccer player who plays as a goalkeeper.

== Playing career ==
=== Ottawa Fury ===
After spending several months training with the club in 2015, MacRae signed his first professional contract with North American Soccer League side Ottawa Fury on February 2, 2016. In two seasons with Ottawa he failed to make an appearance and left the club at the end of 2017.

=== Larne ===
In spring 2018, MacRae joined Northern Irish Championship side Larne as a mid-season signing and made his debut on April 7, 2018 against PSNI. He made a further three appearances for Larne that season, starting in the club's final games of the season in late April, and conceded three goals in four league appearances overall.

=== FC Tulsa ===
On January 31, 2019 MacRae signed with USL Championship side Tulsa Roughnecks. On March 23, 2019 he made his professional debut as a substitute against the Tacoma Defiance.
