= Mozzi Gyorio =

Canadian soccer player (born 1989)

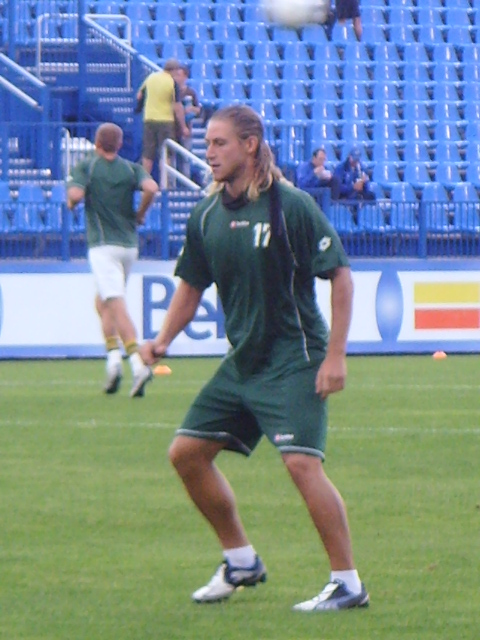
- Gyorio with FC Tampa Bay in 2011

Personal information
- Full name: Mozesh Gyorio
- Date of birth: August 1, 1989 (age 37)
- Place of birth: Bačka Topola, SFR Yugoslavia
- Height: 1.83 m (6 ft 0 in)
- Position: Midfielder

Youth career
- Sherwood Parkdale Rangers
- Stratford Foxes
- 2007: NEC Nijmegen
- 2008–2009: Houston Dynamo

College career
Years	Team	Apps	(Gls)
2007–2008	San Jacinto		

Senior career*
Years	Team	Apps	(Gls)
2007	Avondale Islanders		
2010–2011	FC Tampa Bay	43	(4)
2013	Fleetwood Town	1	(0)
2014–2015	Minnesota United	0	(0)
2015–2016	Austin Aztex	18	(0)
2016	Ottawa Fury	2	(0)
2017	Villa Musone	34	(4)
2017	Pistunina		

International career
2008–2009	Canada U20	4	(0)
- * Club domestic league appearances and goals as of 3 February 2018

Mozesh "Mozzi" Gyorio (Hungarian: Mózes Gyorío; born August 1, 1989) is a Canadian soccer player.

== Early life ==
His parents were born in Gunaroš in today's Vojvodina, Serbia. His family moved from Yugoslavia to Hungary when he was two years old. Two years later, the family moved to Canada. He speaks English, Hungarian, French, Serbian and Croatian.

== Career ==
=== Youth and college ===
Gyorio moved to Canada with his parents when he was a small child, settling in Stratford, Prince Edward Island. He attended Charlottetown Rural High School, played for Sherwood Parkdale Rangers FC and Stratford Foxes FC, and spent time with the youth academy of the famed Dutch club NEC Nijmegen in 2007. He later returned to North America to continue his education.

He subsequently played two years of college soccer at San Jacinto College, where he received honors such as being a NJCAA All-American honorable mention, selected to the NJCAA all-region team and NSCAA all-region 2nd team, and named the college's offensive MVP in his senior year. He also had a stint with Major League Soccer side Houston Dynamo's academy and participated in the Dallas Cup in 2009.

During his college years, Gyorio also played for the Canadian amateur side Avondale Islanders in the Nova Scotia Soccer League.

=== Professional ===
Gyorio signed his first professional contract in 2010 when he was recruited by FC Tampa Bay Rowdies in the USSF Division 2 Professional League. He made his professional debut on May 1, 2010, coming on as a substitute for Takuya Yamada in a game against Miami FC. He scored his first professional goals on October 1, 2010, contributing to a 6–3 victory over Crystal Palace Baltimore. On November 30, 2010, Tampa Bay announced its decision to exercise the contract option on Gyorio for the 2011 season.

Tampa Bay announced on December 27, 2011, that it would decline the 2012 contract option on Gyorio. In February 2012, he joined the MLS side Sporting Kansas City as a trialist in their pre-season training camp for the 2012 Major League Soccer season.

On January 1, 2013 Gyorio signed a 6-month deal with English League Two side Fleetwood Town. He made his European debut on February 12 against Oxford United at Kassam Stadium, coming on as a substitute for David Ball. On May 7, 2013, it was announced that Fleetwood would not be offering the midfielder a new contract, and he would therefore be released.

On February 2, 2016, Gyorio made his return to Canada by signing with Ottawa Fury FC. However, in December 2016, the Fury announced that Gyorio would not be returning to the team as the club moved to USL in 2017.

In September 2017, Gyorio signed with Italian Eccellenza club U.S.D. Pistunina, an amateur team in the city Messina, Sicil. However, due to delays in international transfer papers and personal family reasons, he played only a few games with the team before leaving to return to Canada in the middle of November.

== International career ==
Gyorio represented Canada at the 2009 Francophone Games in Lebanon and was a member of the Canadian national U-20 pool.
