= Bryan Olivera =

Uruguayan footballer (born 1994)

Personal information
- Full name: Bryan Olivera Calvo
- Date of birth: 11 March 1994 (age 32)
- Place of birth: Fort Lauderdale, United States
- Height: 1.70 m (5 ft 7 in)
- Position: Midfielder

Team information
- Current team: Fénix

Youth career
- Danubio
- –2012: Deportivo Maldonado
- 2012–2013: Genoa
- 2013–2014: Defensor Sporting

Senior career*
| Years | Team | Apps | (Gls) |
| 2014–2017 | Fluminense | 0 | (0) |
| 2015 | → LA Galaxy II (loan) | 10 | (2) |
| 2016 | → Ottawa Fury (loan) | 19 | (0) |
| 2018 | Fénix | 20 | (2) |
| 2019 | Liverpool Montevideo | 23 | (2) |
| 2020–2021 | Fénix | 3 | (0) |
| 2021–2022 | Querétaro | 15 | (1) |
| 2022 | → Peñarol (loan) | 5 | (0) |
| 2022 | → Danubio (loan) | 9 | (2) |
| 2023–2024 | Plaza Colonia | 26 | (1) |
| 2024 | Volos | 4 | (0) |
| 2025- | Fénix | 8 | (1) |
- * Club domestic league appearances and goals as of August 7 2026

Bryan Olivera Calvo (born 11 March 1994) is a Uruguayan professional footballer who plays as a midfielder for uruguayan club Fénix.

== Career ==
=== Fluminense ===
==== Loan to LA Galaxy II ====
Olivera signed on loan with LA Galaxy II from Fluminense on 10 August 2015.

==== Loan to Ottawa Fury ====
On 7 April 2016, it was announced that the Ottawa Fury had acquired Olivera on loan from Fluminense.

=== Fénix ===
In 2018, Olivera returned to Uruguay, signing with Uruguayan Primera División side Fénix. That season he made 20 appearances, scoring two goals.

=== Liverpool ===
On 2 January 2019, Olivera signed for Montevideo club Liverpool.

== Career statistics ==
As of 7 November 2019.

| Club | Season | League | | | Cup | | Continental | | Other | | Total | |
| Club | Season | Division | Apps | Goals | Apps | Goals | Apps | Goals | Apps | Goals | Apps | Goals |
|---|---|---|---|---|---|---|---|---|---|---|---|---|
| Fluminense | 2014 | Série A | 0 | 0 | – | | – | | – | | 0 | 0 |
| Fluminense | 2016 | Série A | 0 | 0 | – | | – | | 0 | 0 | 0 | 0 |
| Fluminense | 2017 | Série A | 0 | 0 | – | | – | | – | | 0 | 0 |
| LA Galaxy II (loan) | 2015 | USL | 10 | 2 | – | | – | | – | | 10 | 2 |
| Ottawa Fury (loan) | 2016 | NASL | 19 | 0 | 3 | 0 | – | | – | | 22 | 0 |
| Fénix | 2018 | Primera División | 20 | 2 | – | | – | | – | | 20 | 2 |
| Liverpool Montevideo | 2019 | Primera División | 20 | 2 | – | | 2 (Note: Appearance(s) in Copa Sudamericana.) | 0 | – | | 22 | 2 |
| Career total | | | 69 | 6 | 3 | 0 | 2 | 0 | 0 | 0 | 74 | 6 |

== Personal life ==
Olivera is the son of former professional footballer Washington Olivera.
