= Fernando Timbó =

Brazilian footballer (born 1990)

Personal information
- Full name: Fernando de Moraes Sanfelice
- Date of birth: 29 May 1990 (age 36)
- Place of birth: Timbó, Brazil
- Height: 1.85 m (6 ft 1 in)
- Position: Defender

Youth career
- 2005–2010: Coritiba

Senior career*
Years	Team	Apps	(Gls)
2011–2014	Coritiba	0	(0)
2012	→ J. Malucelli (loan)	5	(1)
2015	Austin Aztex	23	(2)
2016	Ottawa Fury	19	(1)
2017	Orlando City B	19	(3)
2018	Paysandu	20	(2)
2019–2020	Paraná	10	(1)
2020	Londrina	0	(0)
2020–2021	Vilafranquense	9	(0)
2022	Independente Futebol São Joseense	4	(0)
- * Club domestic league appearances and goals as of 1 January 2023

Fernando de Moraes Sanfelice (born 29 May 1990), known as Fernando Timbó, is a Brazilian footballer who plays as a centre-back and left-back. Have played in youth and senior career for Coritiba Foot Ball Club, Reb Bull Brazil, Austin Aztex, Ottawa Fury, Orlando City, Paysandu, Paraná Clube, Londrina and Vilafranquense.

His nickname “Timbó” comes from his hometown in Brazil.
