= 2015 North American Soccer League season =

North American Soccer League
- Season: 2015
- Champions: New York Cosmos
- Spring Champions: New York Cosmos
- Fall Champions: Ottawa Fury
- Matches: 165
- Goals: 453 (2.75 per match)
- Top goalscorer: BRA Stefano Pinho (16)
- Biggest home win: 6 goals: FTL 7–1 IND (Aug 29)
- Biggest away win: 4 goals: JAX 0–4 CAR (May 30)
- Highest scoring: 8 goals: FTL 7–1 IND (Aug 29)
- Longest winning run: 5 games: Ottawa Fury (Jul 19 – Aug 8)
- Longest unbeaten run: 12 games: Ottawa Fury (May 9 – Aug 8); Ottawa Fury (Aug 26 – Oct 31)
- Longest winless run: 8 games: Atlanta Silverbacks (Apr 25 – Jul 4); Jacksonville Armada (May 16 – Jul 15)
- Longest losing run: 4 games: Atlanta Silverbacks (May 24 – Jul 4); Carolina RailHawks (Aug 12 – 30); FC Edmonton (Oct 4 – 17)
- Highest attendance: 16,167; JAX 3–1 FCE (Apr 4)
- Lowest attendance: 1,112; FCE 4–0 SAS (Jul 5)
- Total attendance: 975,558
- Average attendance: 5,912

The 2015 North American Soccer League season was the 48th season of Division II soccer in the United States and the fifth season of the North American Soccer League. It was contested by eleven teams including two from Canada. Jacksonville Armada FC made their NASL debut this season. The defending Soccer Bowl champions were the San Antonio Scorpions, while Minnesota United FC were the defending North American Supporters' Trophy winners. A split season format was used for the 2015 season.

== Teams, stadiums, and personnel ==
=== Stadiums and locations ===
Locations of NASL clubs

=== Personnel and sponsorship ===
| Team | Head coach | Captain | Kit producer | Shirt sponsor |
|---|---|---|---|---|
| Atlanta Silverbacks | (England) Gary Smith | (England) Simon Mensing | Reto Sports | |
| Carolina RailHawks | (Northern Ireland) Colin Clarke | (United States) Connor Tobin | Adidas | Blue Cross Blue Shield of NC |
| FC Edmonton | (Canada) Colin Miller | (Northern Ireland) Albert Watson | Adidas | The Fath Group |
| Fort Lauderdale Strikers | (Austria) Günter Kronsteiner | (Honduras) Iván Guerrero | Nike | Azul Airlines |
| Indy Eleven | (United States) Tim Regan (interim) | (Germany) Kristian Nicht | Diadora | Honda |
| Jacksonville Armada FC | (United States) Eric Dade (interim) | (Argentina) Marcos Flores | Nike | Winn-Dixie |
| Minnesota United FC | (United States) Manny Lagos | (United States) Aaron Pitchkolan | Inaria | Atomic Data / Mall of America |
| New York Cosmos | (Venezuela) Giovanni Savarese | (United States) Carlos Mendes | Nike | Emirates |
| Ottawa Fury FC | (Canada) Marc Dos Santos | (Republic of Ireland) Richie Ryan | Admiral | The Heart and Crown |
| San Antonio Scorpions | (Canada) Alen Marcina | (Canada) Adrian Cann | Nike | Toyota |
| Tampa Bay Rowdies | (Scotland) Stuart Campbell | (Brazil) Marcelo Saragosa | Nike | Hard Rock |

=== Managerial changes ===
| Team | Outgoing manager | Manner of departure | Date of vacancy | Position in table | Incoming manager | Date of appointment |
|---|---|---|---|---|---|---|
| Atlanta Silverbacks | (Uruguay) Alejandro Pombo | End of interim period | November 2, 2014 | Pre-Season | (England) Gary Smith | December 23, 2014 |
| Fort Lauderdale Strikers | (Austria) Günter Kronsteiner | Not Returning | December 5, 2014 | Pre-Season | (Argentina) Marcelo Neveleff | January 19, 2015 |
| Jacksonville Armada | Expansion team | | | | (Argentina) José Luis Villarreal | June 14, 2014 |
| Tampa Bay Rowdies | (England) Ricky Hill | Fired | November 18, 2014 | Pre-Season | (Netherlands) Thomas Rongen | December 3, 2014 |
| Jacksonville Armada | (Argentina) José Luis Villarreal | Resigned | May 22, 2015 | 6th | (Argentina) Guillermo Ángel Hoyos | June 14, 2015 |
| Indy Eleven | (United States) Juergen Sommer | Fired | June 2, 2015 | 11th | (United States) Tim Regan (interim) | June 2, 2015 |
| Fort Lauderdale Strikers | (Argentina) Marcelo Neveleff | Resigned | June 7, 2015 | 10th | (Honduras) Iván Guerrero (interim) | June 7, 2015 |
| Fort Lauderdale Strikers | (Honduras) Iván Guerrero (interim) | End of interim period | June 30, 2015 | 8th | (Austria) Günter Kronsteiner | June 30, 2015 |
| Tampa Bay Rowdies | (Netherlands) Thomas Rongen | Fired | August 21, 2015 | 10th | (Scotland) Stuart Campbell | August 26, 2015 |
| Jacksonville Armada | (Argentina) Guillermo Ángel Hoyos | Fired | September 21, 2015 | 11th | (United States) Eric Dade (interim) | September 21, 2015 |

== Spring season ==
The Spring season began on April 4 and ended on June 13. The schedule featured a single round robin format with each team playing every other team in the league a single time. Each team hosted 5 home games and played 5 road games. The winner of the Spring season earned one of four berths in the playoffs, known as The Championship.

=== Standings ===
| Pos | Team | Pld | W | D | L | GF | GA | GD | Pts | Qualification |
|---|---|---|---|---|---|---|---|---|---|---|
| 1 | New York Cosmos (S) | 10 | 5 | 5 | 0 | 18 | 9 | +9 | 20 | Playoffs |
| 2 | Tampa Bay Rowdies | 10 | 5 | 4 | 1 | 15 | 9 | +6 | 19 | |
| 3 | Carolina RailHawks | 10 | 3 | 5 | 2 | 15 | 10 | +5 | 14 | |
| 4 | Minnesota United | 10 | 3 | 5 | 2 | 15 | 13 | +2 | 14 | |
| 5 | Indy Eleven | 10 | 3 | 4 | 3 | 13 | 12 | +1 | 13 | |
| 6 | Jacksonville Armada | 10 | 3 | 3 | 4 | 15 | 18 | −3 | 12 | |
| 7 | San Antonio Scorpions | 10 | 3 | 3 | 4 | 11 | 15 | −4 | 12 | |
| 8 | Fort Lauderdale Strikers | 10 | 3 | 2 | 5 | 12 | 13 | −1 | 11 | |
| 9 | Ottawa Fury | 10 | 2 | 5 | 3 | 5 | 8 | −3 | 11 | |
| 10 | FC Edmonton | 10 | 2 | 3 | 5 | 16 | 22 | −6 | 9 | |
| 11 | Atlanta Silverbacks | 10 | 1 | 5 | 4 | 7 | 13 | −6 | 8 | |

Source: NASL
Rules for classification: 1) points; 2) total goal differential; 3) total goals scored; 4) head-to-head record; 5) away goal differential; 6) away goals scored
(S) Spring season champion

=== Results ===
| Home \ Away | ATL | CAR | FCE | FTL | IND | JAX | MNU | NYC | OTT | SAS | TBR |
|---|---|---|---|---|---|---|---|---|---|---|---|
| Atlanta Silverbacks | | | | | 1–1 | 1–1 | | 0–0 | 1–1 | 0–1 | |
| Carolina RailHawks | 1–2 | | | | | | 1–1 | 2–2 | 3–1 | | 1–1 |
| Edmonton | 4–2 | 1–1 | | 3–2 | | | 2–2 | | | 2–3 | |
| Fort Lauderdale Strikers | 0–0 | 0–1 | | | 1–2 | 2–1 | | 0–1 | | | |
| Indy Eleven | | 1–1 | 3–0 | | | | 1–3 | 1–1 | | | 2–2 |
| Jacksonville Armada | | 0–4 | 3–1 | | 1–0 | | | | 0–0 | 2–1 | |
| Minnesota United | 1–0 | | | 2–3 | | 3–2 | | 1–1 | | 2–2 | |
| New York Cosmos | | | 4–2 | | | 3–3 | | | 1–0 | 3–0 | 2–0 |
| Ottawa Fury | | | 0–0 | 1–3 | 1–0 | | 1–0 | | | | 0–0 |
| San Antonio Scorpions | | 1–0 | | 1–1 | 1–2 | | | | 0–0 | | 1–3 |
| Tampa Bay Rowdies | 3–0 | | 2–1 | 1–0 | | 3–2 | 0–0 | | | | |

Legend: Blue = home team win; Yellow = draw; Red = away team win.

== Fall season ==
The Fall season began on July 4 and ended on November 1. The schedule featured each team playing every other team in the league once at home and once away. The winner of the Fall season earned one of four berths in The Championship.

=== Standings ===
| Pos | Team | Pld | W | D | L | GF | GA | GD | Pts | Qualification |
|---|---|---|---|---|---|---|---|---|---|---|
| 1 | Ottawa Fury (F) | 20 | 13 | 6 | 1 | 37 | 15 | +22 | 45 | Playoffs |
| 2 | Minnesota United | 20 | 11 | 6 | 3 | 39 | 26 | +13 | 39 | |
| 3 | New York Cosmos | 20 | 10 | 6 | 4 | 31 | 21 | +10 | 36 | |
| 4 | Fort Lauderdale Strikers | 20 | 8 | 6 | 6 | 37 | 27 | +10 | 30 | |
| 5 | FC Edmonton | 20 | 7 | 5 | 8 | 25 | 24 | +1 | 26 | |
| 6 | Atlanta Silverbacks | 20 | 6 | 7 | 7 | 24 | 27 | −3 | 25 | |
| 7 | Carolina RailHawks | 20 | 6 | 3 | 11 | 29 | 39 | −10 | 21 | |
| 8 | Tampa Bay Rowdies | 20 | 5 | 5 | 10 | 18 | 28 | −10 | 20 | |
| 9 | Indy Eleven | 20 | 5 | 5 | 10 | 23 | 36 | −13 | 20 | |
| 10 | San Antonio Scorpions | 20 | 4 | 7 | 9 | 30 | 37 | −7 | 19 | |
| 11 | Jacksonville Armada | 20 | 5 | 4 | 11 | 18 | 31 | −13 | 19 | |

Source: NASL
Rules for classification: 1) points; 2) total goal differential; 3) total goals scored; 4) head-to-head record; 5) away goal differential; 6) away goals scored
(F) Fall season champion

=== Results ===
| Home \ Away | ATL | CAR | FCE | FTL | IND | JAX | MNU | NYC | OTT | SAS | TBR |
|---|---|---|---|---|---|---|---|---|---|---|---|
| Atlanta Silverbacks | | 2–1 | 1–0 | 2–1 | 1–1 | 1–0 | 1–2 | 0–3 | 1–1 | 3–3 | 0–0 |
| Carolina RailHawks | 2–0 | | 2–1 | 1–1 | 3–1 | 3–0 | 3–1 | 1–3 | 1–3 | 3–2 | 1–1 |
| Edmonton | 1–3 | 3–0 | | 0–2 | 2–0 | 1–1 | 1–1 | 2–1 | 0–1 | 4–0 | 1–0 |
| Fort Lauderdale Strikers | 2–2 | 4–0 | 1–1 | | 7–1 | 2–0 | 2–5 | 3–3 | 0–2 | 0–0 | 2–1 |
| Indy Eleven | 0–1 | 2–1 | 0–2 | 2–1 | | 3–0 | 3–1 | 1–1 | 1–4 | 1–2 | 2–0 |
| Jacksonville Armada | 1–0 | 3–0 | 3–2 | 0–1 | 1–1 | | 3–3 | 1–0 | 1–3 | 0–0 | 2–0 |
| Minnesota United | 1–0 | 3–1 | 1–1 | 2–1 | 1–0 | 4–0 | | 0–0 | 1–1 | 2–2 | 1–0 |
| New York Cosmos | 1–1 | 3–2 | 3–0 | 2–0 | 1–1 | 1–0 | 2–1 | | 1–4 | 2–1 | 2–0 |
| Ottawa Fury | 2–1 | 2–1 | 2–0 | 0–0 | 4–2 | 2–0 | 1–2 | 0–0 | | 1–0 | 2–2 |
| San Antonio Scorpions | 3–3 | 3–3 | 2–2 | 2–4 | 2–0 | 1–0 | 3–4 | 1–2 | 0–1 | | 3–0 |
| Tampa Bay Rowdies | 2–1 | 1–0 | 0–1 | 1–3 | 1–1 | 3–2 | 1–3 | 2–0 | 1–1 | 2–0 | |

Legend: Blue = home team win; Yellow = draw; Red = away team win.

== Playoffs ==

The Championship, culminating with Soccer Bowl 2015, was contested by the winners of the spring and fall seasons hosting the next best two teams in the full year regular season table. The half-season champions earned the No. 1 and No. 2 seeds, with the higher seed going to the team with the better full-season record. The two next-best teams earned the No. 3 and No. 4 seeds. The semi-finals had the No. 1 seed hosting the No. 4 seed and the No. 2 seed hosting the No. 3 seed. The winners met in the Soccer Bowl 2015 hosted by the team with the higher seed.

=== Combined standings ===
| Pos | Team | Pld | W | D | L | GF | GA | GD | Pts | Qualification |
|---|---|---|---|---|---|---|---|---|---|---|
| 1 | New York Cosmos (C, X) | 30 | 15 | 11 | 4 | 49 | 30 | +19 | 56 | Championship qualifiers (Note: As spring season champions) |
| 2 | Ottawa Fury | 30 | 15 | 11 | 4 | 42 | 23 | +19 | 56 | Championship qualifiers (Note: As fall season champions) |
| 3 | Minnesota United | 30 | 14 | 11 | 5 | 54 | 39 | +15 | 53 | Championship qualifiers (Note: As next best teams in overall standings) |
| 4 | Fort Lauderdale Strikers | 30 | 11 | 8 | 11 | 49 | 40 | +9 | 41 | Championship qualifiers |
| 5 | Tampa Bay Rowdies | 30 | 10 | 9 | 11 | 33 | 37 | −4 | 39 | |
| 6 | Carolina RailHawks | 30 | 9 | 8 | 13 | 44 | 49 | −5 | 35 | |
| 7 | FC Edmonton | 30 | 9 | 8 | 13 | 41 | 46 | −5 | 35 | |
| 8 | Atlanta Silverbacks | 30 | 7 | 12 | 11 | 31 | 40 | −9 | 33 | |
| 9 | Indy Eleven | 30 | 8 | 9 | 13 | 36 | 48 | −12 | 33 | |
| 10 | San Antonio Scorpions | 30 | 7 | 10 | 13 | 41 | 52 | −11 | 31 | |
| 11 | Jacksonville Armada | 30 | 8 | 7 | 15 | 33 | 49 | −16 | 31 | |

Source: NASL
Rules for classification: 1) points; 2) total goal differential; 3) total goals scored; 4) head-to-head record; 5) away goal differential; 6) away goals scored
(C) Champions; (X) Regular season champion

=== The Championship ===
==== Participants ====
- New York Cosmos (Spring season champion)
- Ottawa Fury (Fall season champion)
- Minnesota United
- Fort Lauderdale Strikers

==== Bracket ====
Semifinals
1 | New York Cosmos | 2
4 | Fort Lauderdale Strikers | 1
2 | Ottawa Fury (a.e.t.) | 2
3 | Minnesota United | 1

Soccer Bowl
1 | New York Cosmos | 3
2 | Ottawa Fury | 2

==== Semifinals ====
November 7, 2015
2:00 pm EST

| New York Cosmos | 2–1 | Fort Lauderdale Strikers |
|---|---|---|
| Cellerino 37' (yellow card) 74'; Senna (yellow card) 58'; Raúl 61'; Szetela (yellow card) 71' | Report; Report | PC 16'; Thomas (yellow card) 33' |

MCU Park, Brooklyn, New York
Attendance: 5,061
Referee: Sorin Stoica

November 8, 2015
3:00 pm EST

| Ottawa Fury | 2–1 (a.e.t.) | Minnesota United |
|---|---|---|
| Heinemann (yellow card) 9' (goal) 47', 108'; Trafford (yellow card) 104' | Report; Report | Calvano (yellow card) 2'; Ramirez 7' (pen.); Ibson (yellow card) 45'; Mendes (yellow card) 45+'; Vicentini (yellow card) 100'; Jordan (yellow card) 120+' |

TD Place Stadium, Ottawa, Ontario
Attendance: 9,346
Referee: Mathieu Bourdeau (CAN)

==== Soccer Bowl 2015 ====
November 15, 2015
5:00 pm EST

| New York Cosmos | 3–2 | Ottawa Fury |
|---|---|---|
| Cellerino (yellow card) 7' (goal) 8', 72', 85'; Maurer (yellow card) 41'; Guenzatti (yellow card) 60' | Report; Report; Report | Trafford (red card) 68'; Heinemann 70', 90+2'; Falvey (yellow card) 76'; Ryan (yellow card) 76' |

Shuart Stadium, Hempstead, New York
Attendance: 10,166
Referee: Alan Kelly

== Attendance ==
| Club | GP | Total | High | Low | Average | Change |
|---|---|---|---|---|---|---|
| Indy Eleven | 15 | 147,139 | 10,524 | 8,500 | 9,809 | -6.3% |
| Minnesota United | 15 | 131,499 | 9,418 | 5,890 | 8,767 | 9.9% |
| Jacksonville Armada | 15 | 118,905 | 16,164 | 5,652 | 7,927 | N/A |
| San Antonio Scorpions | 15 | 101,043 | 8,053 | 4,105 | 6,736 | -0.3% |
| Tampa Bay Rowdies | 15 | 84,739 | 7,010 | 4,219 | 5,649 | 24.2% |
| Ottawa Fury | 15 | 77,464 | 6,899 | 3,023 | 5,164 | 24.5% |
| New York Cosmos | 15 | 75,927 | 12,550 | 3,326 | 5,062 | 7.6% |
| Carolina RailHawks | 15 | 68,080 | 7,217 | 3,055 | 4,539 | -0.1% |
| Fort Lauderdale Strikers | 15 | 67,067 | 11,691 | 1,278 | 4,471 | 9.9% |
| Atlanta Silverbacks | 15 | 60,366 | 5,511 | 2,302 | 4,024 | -0.7% |
| FC Edmonton | 15 | 43,329 | 4,240 | 1,112 | 2,889 | -14.6% |
| Total | 165 | 975,558 | 16,164 | 1,112 | 5,912 | 7.5% |

Source: NASL

== Statistical leaders ==
=== Top scorers ===
| Rank | Player | Club | Goals |
|---|---|---|---|
| 1 | (Brazil) Stefano Pinho | Fort Lauderdale Strikers | 16 |
| 2 | (United States) Christian Ramirez | Minnesota United | 12 |
| 3 | (Spain) Nacho Novo | Carolina RailHawks | 11 |
| 4 | (Jamaica) Omar Cummings | San Antonio Scorpions | 10 |
| 5 | (Colombia) Rafael Castillo | San Antonio Scorpions | 8 |
| 5 | (Brazil) Leo Fernandes | New York Cosmos | 8 |
| 5 | (Northern Ireland) Daryl Fordyce | Edmonton | 8 |
| 5 | (Brazil) Marlon Freitas | Fort Lauderdale Strikers | 8 |
| 5 | (United States) Tom Heinemann | Ottawa Fury | 8 |
| 5 | (Jamaica) Lance Laing | Edmonton | 8 |
| 5 | (Spain) Raúl | New York Cosmos | 8 |

=== Top assists ===
| Rank | Player | Club | Assists |
|---|---|---|---|
| 1 | (Bulgaria) Georgi Hristov | Tampa Bay Rowdies | 9 |
| 1 | (South Africa) Tiyi Shipalane | Carolina RailHawks | 9 |
| 3 | (Turks and Caicos Islands) Billy Forbes | San Antonio Scorpions | 8 |
| 4 | (United States) Jaime Chavez | Atlanta Silverbacks | 7 |
| 4 | (Jamaica) Lance Laing | Edmonton | 7 |
| 4 | (Brazil) Stefano Pinho | Fort Lauderdale Strikers | 7 |
| 4 | (Bosnia and Herzegovina) Siniša Ubiparipović | Ottawa Fury | 7 |
| 8 | (Ghana) Khalif Alhassan | Minnesota United | 6 |
| 8 | (El Salvador) Junior Burgos | Atlanta Silverbacks | 6 |
| 8 | (United States) Christian Ramirez | Minnesota United | 6 |
| 8 | (United States) Kevin Venegas | Minnesota United | 6 |

=== Clean sheets ===
| Rank | Player | Club | Clean Sheets |
|---|---|---|---|
| 1 | (France) Romuald Peiser | Ottawa Fury | 14 |
| 2 | (United States) Jimmy Maurer | New York Cosmos | 12 |
| 3 | (Cameroon) Sammy Ndjock | Minnesota United | 7 |
| 3 | (United States) Matt Pickens | Tampa Bay Rowdies | 7 |
| 5 | (United States) Matt Van Oekel | Edmonton | 6 |
| 6 | (Haiti) Steward Ceus | Atlanta Silverbacks | 5 |
| 7 | (Portugal) Daniel Fernandes | San Antonio Scorpions | 4 |
| 7 | (Japan) Akira Fitzgerald | Carolina RailHawks | 4 |
| 7 | (Mexico) Miguel Gallardo | Jacksonville Armada | 4 |
| 7 | (United States) David Meves | Fort Lauderdale Strikers | 4 |

Source: NASL

=== Hat-tricks ===
| Player | For | Against | Result | Date |
|---|---|---|---|---|
| (Brazil) Stefano Pinho | Fort Lauderdale Strikers | Indy Eleven | 7–1 | August 29, 2015 |
| (Brazil) Stefano Pinho | Fort Lauderdale Strikers | San Antonio Scorpions | 4–2 | October 3, 2015 |

== Awards ==
=== Monthly awards ===
| Month | NASL Player of the Month | | | |
| Month | Player | Club | Stats | Ref |
|---|---|---|---|---|
| April | (United States) Jimmy Maurer | New York Cosmos | 12SV, 1GA | |
| May | (Spain) Raúl | New York Cosmos | 3G | |
| June | (France) Romuald Peiser | Ottawa Fury | 9SV, 0GA | |
| July | (United States) Christian Ramirez | Minnesota United | 4G, 2A | |
| August | (Brazil) Stefano Pinho | Fort Lauderdale Strikers | 6G, 1A | |
| September | (France) Romuald Peiser | Ottawa Fury | 11SV, 2GA | |
| October | (Brazil) Stefano Pinho | Fort Lauderdale Strikers | 4G, 3A | |

=== Weekly awards ===
| Week | NASL Player of the Week | | NASL Play of the Week | |
| Week | Player | Club | Player | Club |
|---|---|---|---|---|
| Week 1 | (Serbia) Stefan Antonijevic | Tampa Bay Rowdies | (United States) Jemal Johnson | Jacksonville Armada |
| Week 2 | (Brazil) PC | Fort Lauderdale Strikers | (Brazil) PC | Fort Lauderdale Strikers |
| Week 3 | (The Gambia) Sainey Nyassi | FC Edmonton | (Honduras) Sergio Peña | Indy Eleven |
| Week 4 | (Brazil) Maicon Santos | Tampa Bay Rowdies | (Georgia (country)) Zourab Tsiskaridze | San Antonio Scorpions |
| Week 5 | (Guinea) Alhassane Keita | Jacksonville Armada | (Jamaica) Omar Cummings | San Antonio Scorpions |
| Week 6 | (United States) Carlos Mendes | New York Cosmos | (Argentina) Bochy Hoyos | Jacksonville Armada |
| Week 7 | (Turks and Caicos Islands) Billy Forbes | San Antonio Scorpions | (El Salvador) Andrés Flores | New York Cosmos |
| Week 8 | (Spain) Raúl | New York Cosmos | (Scotland) Nicki Paterson | Ottawa Fury |
| Week 9 | (United States) Kyle Hyland | Indy Eleven | (British Virgin Islands) Lionel Brown | Fort Lauderdale Strikers |
| Week 10 | (United States) Victor Pineda | Indy Eleven | (United States) Brian Shriver | Tampa Bay Rowdies |
| Week 11 | (Haiti) Pascal Millien | Jacksonville Armada | (United States) Hagop Chirishian | New York Cosmos |
| Week 12 | (Jamaica) Lance Laing | FC Edmonton | (Poland) Wojciech Wojcik | Indy Eleven |
| Week 13 | (Jamaica) Omar Cummings | San Antonio Scorpions | (Poland) Wojciech Wojcik | Indy Eleven |
| Week 14 | (Spain) Nacho Novo | Carolina RailHawks | (United States) Jaime Chavez | Atlanta Silverbacks |
| Week 15 | (Canada) Carl Haworth | Ottawa Fury | (United States) Dylan Mares | Indy Eleven |
| Week 16 | (Brazil) Rafael Alves | Ottawa Fury | (Brazil) Pedro Mendes | Atlanta Silverbacks |
| Week 17 | (Brazil) Pedro Mendes | Atlanta Silverbacks | (El Salvador) Junior Burgos | Atlanta Silverbacks |
| Week 18 | (Colombia) Jaime Castrillón | Jacksonville Armada | (Brazil) Stefano Pinho | Fort Lauderdale Strikers |
| Week 19 | (Brazil) Stefano Pinho | Fort Lauderdale Strikers | (United States) Justin Davis | Minnesota United |
| Week 20 | (Brazil) Stefano Pinho | Fort Lauderdale Strikers | (Brazil) Stefano Pinho | Fort Lauderdale Strikers |
| Week 21 | (United States) Zach Steinberger | Indy Eleven | (Guatemala) Marvin Ceballos | Indy Eleven |
| Week 22 | (Colombia) Rafael Castillo | San Antonio Scorpions | (Brazil) Pablo Campos | Minnesota United |
| Week 23 | (Bosnia and Herzegovina) Siniša Ubiparipović | Ottawa Fury | (Brazil) Pedro Mendes | Atlanta Silverbacks |
| Week 24 | (United States) Tom Heinemann | Ottawa Fury | (Ghana) Kalif Alhassan | Minnesota United |
| Week 25 | (Brazil) Stefano Pinho | Fort Lauderdale Strikers | (United States) Kris Tyrpak | San Antonio Scorpions |
| Week 26 | (Brazil) Pablo Campos | Minnesota United | (United States) Giuseppe Gentile | San Antonio Scorpions |
| Week 27 | (Brazil) Stefano Pinho | Fort Lauderdale Strikers | (United States) Brad Ring | Indy Eleven |
| Week 28 | (El Salvador) Richard Menjivar | Tampa Bay Rowdies | (Haiti) Mechack Jérôme | Jacksonville Armada |
| Week 29 | (Spain) Raúl | New York Cosmos | (El Salvador) Junior Burgos | Atlanta Silverbacks |

=== League awards ===
- Golden Ball (MVP): (Brazil) Stefano Pinho (Fort Lauderdale Strikers)
- Golden Boot: (Brazil) Stefano Pinho (Fort Lauderdale Strikers)
- Golden Glove: (France) Romuald Peiser (Ottawa Fury)
- Coach of the Year: (Canada) Marc Dos Santos (Ottawa Fury)
- Goal of the Year: (El Salvador) Junior Burgos (Atlanta Silverbacks)
- Young (U24) Player of the Year: (Brazil) Leo Fernandes (New York Cosmos)
- Humanitarian of the Year: (Canada) Drew Beckie (Ottawa Fury)
- Fair Play Award: Ottawa Fury

NASL Best XI
| Position | Player | Team |
|---|---|---|
| Goalkeeper | (France) Romuald Peiser | Ottawa Fury |
| Defense | (Brazil) Rafael Alves | Ottawa Fury |
| Defense | (United States) Justin Davis | Minnesota United |
| Defense | (United States) Carlos Mendes | New York Cosmos |
| Defense | (United States) Kevin Venegas | Minnesota United |
| Midfield | (Republic of Ireland) Richie Ryan | Ottawa Fury |
| Midfield | (Jamaica) Lance Laing | FC Edmonton |
| Midfield | (Brazil) Ibson | Minnesota United |
| Midfield | (Haiti) James Marcelin | Fort Lauderdale Strikers |
| Forward | (Brazil) Stefano Pinho | Fort Lauderdale Strikers |
| Forward | (United States) Christian Ramirez | Minnesota United |
