= Miles Byass =

American soccer player (born 1991)

Personal information
- Full name: Miles Patrick-Anthony Byass
- Date of birth: December 13, 1991 (age 34)
- Place of birth: Loma Linda, California, U.S.
- Height: 1.86 m (6 ft 1 in)
- Position: Forward

Team information
- Current team: Foro SC
- Number: 15

Youth career
- –2009: Los Gauchos SC
- 2009–2010: Arsenal Soccer Academy
- 2010: LA Galaxy

College career
Years	Team	Apps	(Gls)
2010–2011	San Diego State Aztecs	33	(10)

Senior career*
Years	Team	Apps	(Gls)
2012	Orange County Blue Star		
2013	Seattle Sounders U-23		
2014	FF Jaro	3	(1)
2014	MYPA	1	(1)
2014	JIPPO	22	(7)
2019	Fort Worth Vaqueros	15	(5)
2019–2022	Foro SC	63	(59)

International career
2009–2010	United States U-18	12	(2)
- * Club domestic league appearances and goals

Miles Patrick-Anthony Byass (born December 13, 1991) is an American retired professional soccer player.

== Club career ==
=== Youth and amateur ===
While in high school, Byass played for Arsenal Soccer Academy in Temecula, California. He was recruited by the LA Galaxy Academy program in early 2010, but quit after being told he would not be allowed to play high school soccer simultaneously. While a senior in high school Byass trained in Germany with two Bundesliga clubs.

Byass played two years of college soccer for San Diego State University and was an All-Pac-10 Conference team honorable mention.

Byass played in the USL PDL for two years, first with Orange County Blue Star in 2012 and then with Seattle Sounders FC U-23 the following year.

=== Finland ===
In early 2014, Byass signed with Finnish club FF Jaro. He made three cup appearances, scoring one goal before joining MYPA. Byass made only one cup appearance for MYPA scoring in this match, before finding stability with Ykkönen club JIPPO. He made 22 appearances for the club in 2014, scoring seven goals.

=== Free agency ===
In February 2016, Byass went on trial with Canadian NASL club Ottawa Fury.

== International career ==
While with Arsenal Soccer Academy in 2009, Byass was called up to the U.S. under-18 team for the 2009 Milk Cup. also appearing in the 2009 Australian Youth Olympics (Stats) and the 2009 Lisbon International Cup
