= Uğur Albayrak =

German footballer

Personal information
- Date of birth: 8 June 1988 (age 38)
- Place of birth: Frankfurt, West Germany
- Height: 1.81 m (5 ft 11 in)
- Position: Striker

Team information
- Current team: Türkgücü Frankfurt
- Number: 9

Youth career
- Kickers Offenbach

Senior career*
Years	Team	Apps	(Gls)
2007–2008	Kickers Offenbach II	13	(8)
2008–2010	Kickers Offenbach	32	(3)
2010–2011	Kayserispor	0	(0)
2011	FSV Frankfurt II	8	(1)
2011	FSV Frankfurt	3	(0)
2011–2012	Eintracht Frankfurt II	23	(12)
2012–2013	SV Darmstadt 98	6	(0)
2013–2014	Eintracht Frankfurt II	44	(15)
2014–2015	Eintracht Trier 05	16	(2)
2015–2016	Ottawa Fury	6	(0)
2016	Viktoria Aschaffenburg	11	(4)
2016–2017	Wacker 90 Nordhausen	17	(1)
2017–2018	Keçiörengücü	17	(4)
2018–2019	Hanauer SC	19	(8)
2019–2020	Türk SV Bad Nauheim	17	(6)
2020–	Türkgücü Frankfurt	3	(2)
- * Club domestic league appearances and goals as of 15 February 2021

Uğur Albayrak (born 8 June 1988) is a German footballer who plays for Turkish club TSKV Türkgücü Frankfurt 1983.
