= Rafael Alves (footballer, born 1985) =

Brazilian footballer

Personal information
- Full name: Rafael Alves de Magalhães Aguiar
- Date of birth: 18 January 1985 (age 41)
- Place of birth: Praia Grande, Brazil
- Height: 1.91 m (6 ft 3 in)
- Position: Defender

Team information
- Current team: Florida Tropics SC
- Number: 33

Youth career
- 1998–2001: Portuguesa

Senior career*
| Years | Team | Apps | (Gls) |
| 2004 | União São João | | |
| 2005 | São Caetano | | |
| 2006 | Oeste | | |
| 2006–2008 | Goiás | | |
| 2007–2008 | → Ituano (loan) | | |
| 2008–2009 | Horizonte | | |
| 2009–2011 | Ituano | | |
| 2011–2012 | Boa | | |
| 2012–2013 | Ocala Stampede | | |
| 2013–2015 | Fort Lauderdale Strikers | 38 | (1) |
| 2015–2016 | Ottawa Fury | 61 | (4) |
| 2017 | Juventude | 2 | (0) |
| 2017– | Florida Tropics (indoor) | 67 | (14) |

International career
| 2017– | Brazil arena/minifootball | | |
- * Club domestic league appearances and goals as of 18 January 2023

Rafael Alves de Magalhães Aguiar (born 18 January 1985) is a Brazilian professional footballer who plays as a defender for Florida Tropics SC of the Major Arena Soccer League.

== Career ==
Born in Praia Grande, Alves started his career in Brazil, playing for Ituano, Boa Esporte, and Goias before moving to the United States to play for the Ocala Stampede of the USL PDL. He then signed for the Fort Lauderdale Strikers of the North American Soccer League before the 2013 spring season. He then made his professional debut for the club on 3 August 2013 against the New York Cosmos in which he started as Fort Lauderdale lost 2–1.

After leaving Canada, Alves joined Brazil's Esporte Clube Juventude but only appeared in 2 matches for the club. Unsatisfied with his opportunities, Alves signed with the Major Arena Soccer League's Florida Tropics SC.

In July 2020, Alves signed a new three-year contract to stay with the Tropics. Alves again renewed his contract with the Tropics on 25 August 2022, signing a two-year deal.

== Career statistics ==
As of 9 April 2016

| Club | Season | League | | | Playoffs | | Cup | | Continental Cup | | Total | |
| Club | Season | Division | Apps | Goals | Apps | Goals | Apps | Goals | Apps | Goals | Apps | Goals |
|---|---|---|---|---|---|---|---|---|---|---|---|---|
| Fort Lauderdale Strikers | 2013 | NASL | 14 | 0 | — | — | 0 | 0 | — | — | 14 | 0 |
| Fort Lauderdale Strikers | 2014 | NASL | 21 | 1 | 2 | 0 | 1 | 0 | — | — | 24 | 1 |
| Ottawa Fury | 2015 | NASL | 30 | 4 | 2 | 0 | 1 | 0 | — | — | 33 | 4 |
| Ottawa Fury | 2016 | NASL | 2 | 0 | 0 | 0 | 0 | 0 | — | — | 2 | 0 |
| Career total | | | 67 | 5 | 4 | 0 | 2 | 0 | 0 | 0 | 73 | 5 |

== Honors ==
Ottawa Fury

- NASL Fall Championship 2015
