= Romuald Peiser =

French footballer (born 1979)

Personal information
- Full name: Romuald Désiré Peiser
- Date of birth: 3 August 1979 (age 47)
- Place of birth: Phalsbourg, France
- Height: 1.87 m (6 ft 1 1/2 in)
- Position: Goalkeeper

Team information
- Current team: Atlético Ottawa

Youth career
- 1993–1995: AS Poissy
- 1995–1997: Paris Saint-Germain

Senior career*
Years	Team	Apps	(Gls)
1997–1998	Paris Saint-Germain B	2	(0)
1998–2001	Bayer Leverkusen II	71	(0)
2001–2002	Uerdingen	6	(0)
2002–2003	Vaduz	11	(0)
2003–2004	Rapid Bucharest	26	(0)
2004–2006	Troyes	16	(0)
2006–2008	Gueugnon	67	(0)
2008–2010	Naval	54	(0)
2010–2014	Académica	58	(0)
2014–2016	Ottawa Fury	73	(0)
2017	San Francisco Deltas	33	(0)
2018	Penn FC	26	(0)
Total		443	(0)

Managerial career
- 2019–2021: Sacramento Republic (assistant)
- 2021–2024: CF Montréal (goalkeeping)
- 2025–: Atlético Ottawa (goalkeeping)
- * Club domestic league appearances and goals

Romuald Désiré Peiser (born 3 August 1979) is a French former professional footballer who played as a goalkeeper. He serves as goalkeeping coach of Canadian club Atlético Ottawa.

== Football career ==
Peiser was born in Phalsbourg, Moselle. After unsuccessfully emerging through Paris Saint-Germain FC's youth system – only appeared for the reserves – he played in Germany with Bayer Leverkusen II and KFC Uerdingen, both in the lower leagues; subsequently, he spent one season in the Swiss Challenge League with FC Vaduz.

Peiser made his top flight debut in the 2003–04 campaign, only missing four Liga I games as FC Rapid București finished in third position. He returned to his country for the following four years, spending two apiece with Troyes AC and FC Gueugnon and being part of the former team's Ligue 1 roster in 2005–06 (no league appearances).

In 2008, aged 29, Peiser moved countries again, going on to start for both Portuguese sides he represented, Associação Naval 1º de Maio and Académica de Coimbra, both in the Primeira Liga. His first match in the competition took place on 4 October 2008 while at the service of the former, in a 1–1 home draw to C.F. Os Belenenses.

On 9 July 2014, Peiser signed with his first non-European club, joining Ottawa Fury FC of the North American Soccer League. In July of the following year, he broke a record in the competition – in both the original and modern-day incarnation – for the longest shutout record.

In December 2016, 37-year-old Peiser moved to fellow league team San Francisco Deltas. He won the Soccer Bowl in his first season, keeping a clean sheet in the decisive match against New York Cosmos (2–0 at the Kezar Stadium).

In March 2018, Peiser signed with United Soccer League side Penn FC. After retiring later in that year, he worked as goalkeeper coach at Sacramento Republic FC.

On 4 June 2021, he was hired to be the new goalkeeper coach for CF Montréal. Peiser left Montréal in December 2024.

On 15 January 2025, Peiser returned to Ottawa as goalkeeping coach of Canadian Premier League side Atlético Ottawa.

== Honours ==
=== Club ===
Académica

- Taça de Portugal: 2011–12

Ottawa Fury

- North American Soccer League: Fall Championship 2015

San Francisco Deltas

- Soccer Bowl: 2017

=== Individual ===
- NASL Golden Glove: 2015
