= Sammy Ndjock =

Cameroonian footballer

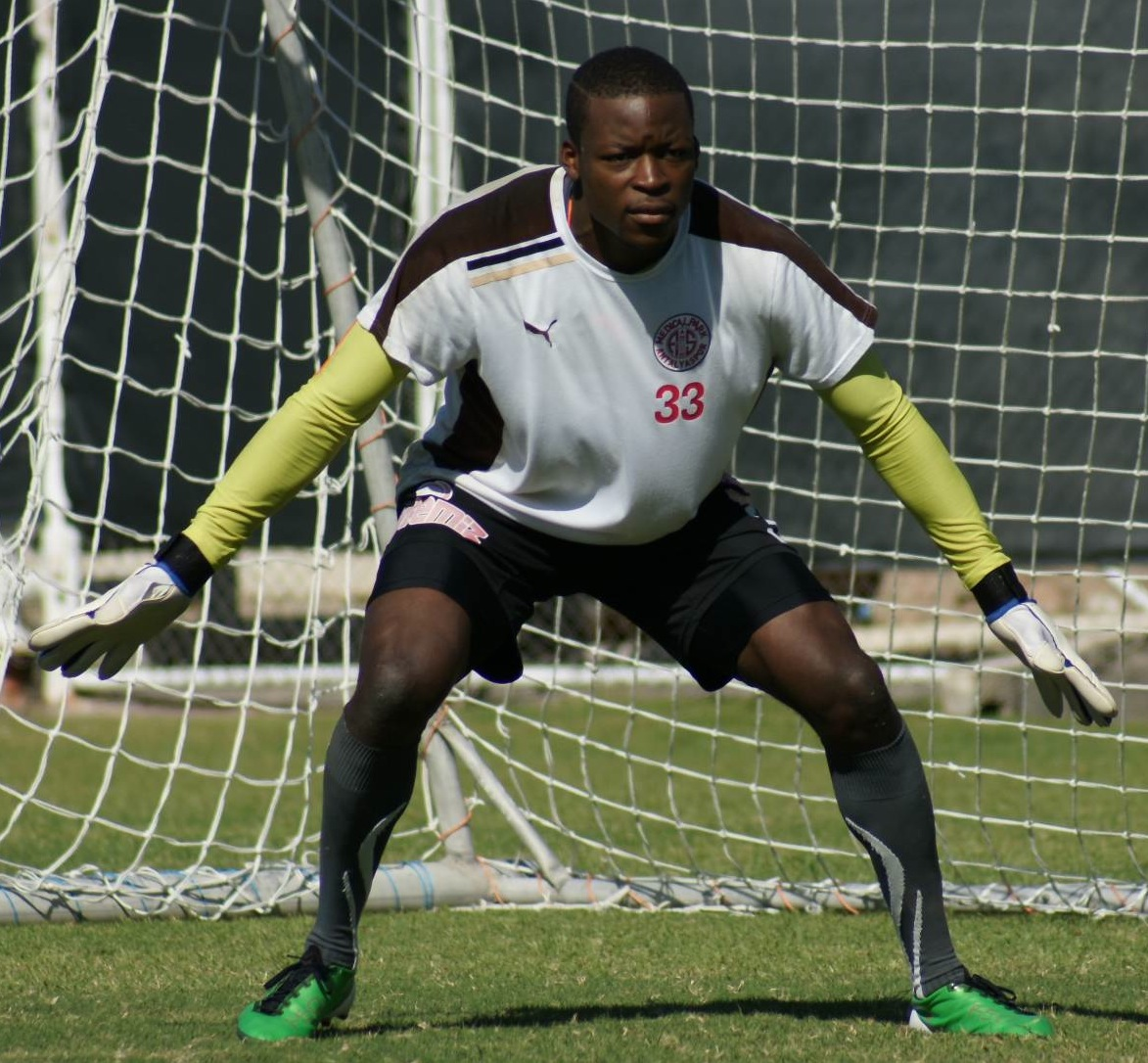
- Ndjock in 2012

Personal information
- Date of birth: February 25, 1990 (age 36)
- Place of birth: Yaoundé, Cameroon
- Height: 1.90 m (6 ft 3 in)
- Position: Goalkeeper

Team information
- Current team: FC LeKI
- Number: 33

Youth career
- 2005–2009: Lille

Senior career*
| Years | Team | Apps | (Gls) |
| 2005–2010 | Lille II | 25 | (0) |
| 2010–2014 | Antalyaspor | 30 | (0) |
| 2013–2014 | → Fethiyespor (loan) | 30 | (0) |
| 2015–2016 | Minnesota United | 52 | (0) |
| 2018–2020 | MP | 35 | (0) |
| 2020 | RoPS | 4 | (0) |
| 2021–2023 | Atlantis | 37 | (0) |
| 2023–2025 | Leki-futis | | |
| 2025– | FC LeKi | | |

International career^{‡}
| 2013–2014 | Cameroon | 3 | (0) |
- * Club domestic league appearances and goals as of 21 February 2023 ‡ National team caps and goals as of 31 May 2015

Sammy Ndjock (born 25 February 1990) is a Cameroonian professional footballer who plays as a goalkeeper for Kolmonen club FC LeKI.

== Club career ==
Born in Yaoundé, Ndjock graduated from Lille's youth categories, and made his senior debuts with the club's B-side in the 2006–07 campaign, in Championnat de France amateur. He joined Turkish Süper Lig side Antalyaspor in August 2010, and made his professional debut late in the month, starting in a 0–0 home draw against Trabzonspor. He played 7 games in his debut season, and repeated the same amount in his second.in his third, he made 15 games.

In August 2013, Ndjock moved to Fethiyespor, and played in TFF First League, in a season-long loan deal. He was an undisputed starter during the campaign, also playing the full 90 minutes in a 2-1 Turkish Cup success against country giants Fenerbahçe.

Ndjock signed with Minnesota United on 9 March 2015.

Ndjock joined Mikkelin Palloilijat in January 2018 and played for the club until the summer. After living in Cameroon, he moved back to Finland and signed for the same club again on 24 November 2018.

Ndjock and Palloilijat mutually cancelled the contract in 2020 and he signed with RoPS playing in Veikkausliiga.

In July 2023 his contract with Atlantis FC was terminated after conceding three suspicious goals against Grankulla IFK.

== International career ==
Ndjock made his Cameroon senior international debut on 2 June 2013 in a 0–0 friendly draw with Ukraine, playing the full match. He was part of Cameroon’s squad for the 2014 FIFA World Cup, initially selected in the provisional 28-man squad and later in the final list.

He earned 3 international caps for Cameroon.
