= Ottawa Fury FC Academy =

Semi-professional soccer club

- Full name: Ottawa Fury FC Academy
- League: Première Ligue de soccer du Québec
- 2016: PLSQ, 7th

Ottawa Fury FC Academy was the youth academy and development system of Canadian soccer club Ottawa Fury FC. In 2015 and 2016, they played in the Première Ligue de soccer du Québec.

== History ==
Original logo

The Fury Academy was launched in 2006, under the umbrella of the original Ottawa Fury. At its peak, the Ottawa Fury FC Academy had more than 20 teams of various age levels, among both genders, with the aim of developing players for both its professional squad and women's team. The Academy works with community clubs in the Ottawa area to identify high-potential players, in addition to holding open tryouts. During their early years, they faced some unexpected pushback from other local minor soccer groups competing for youth players.

In 2015, they decided to field two teams in the Quebec-based Première Ligue de soccer du Québec, a Division III league, with their Senior team playing in the man division, while their Junior team played in the Reserve Division. Phil Dos Santos, brother of first-team coach Marc Dos Santos served as the head coach of the Senior Academy team. Fury FC citing the proximity of other teams as making the PLSQ a logical choice, as opposed to joining the Ontario-based League1 Ontario. They were the first club located outside of Quebec to join the league (Ottawa South United would later follow them in 2020). Their home games were based out of Carleton University and TD Place Stadium.

In 2016, the club decided to shut down its academy program and entered into an affiliation with Major League Soccer club Montreal Impact. The move to disband the academy was criticized as hurting the Fury's identity as a soccer club.

== Seasons ==
Season	League	Teams	Record	Rank	League Cup	Ref
2015	Première Ligue de soccer du Québec	7	6–0–12	5th	Quarter-finals	
2016	Première Ligue de soccer du Québec	7	4–2–12	7th	Quarter-finals	
