= Ottawa Fury FC =

Canadian professional soccer club based in Ottawa

Ottawa Fury
- Full name: Ottawa Fury Football Club
- Founded: June 20, 2011; 15 years ago
- Dissolved: November 8, 2019; 7 years ago
- Stadium: TD Place Stadium, Ottawa
- Capacity: 24,000
- Owner: Ottawa Sports and Entertainment Group
- President: John Pugh
- General manager: Julian de Guzman
- League: NASL (2014–2016); USLC (2017–2019)
- Website: ottawafuryfc.com
Home colours	Away colours

Ottawa Fury Football Club was a Canadian professional soccer club based in Ottawa, Ontario. The club competed in the North American Soccer League and USL Championship and played its home games at TD Place Stadium.

The Ottawa Fury FC were dissolved as a soccer club on November 8, 2019 and their USL franchise rights were sold to Miami FC on December 11, 2019. An unrelated club, Atlético Ottawa, were formed in 2020 to enter the Canadian Premier League representing the city, with home games again at TD Place Stadium.

== History ==
=== Formative years ===
On June 20, 2011, the North American Soccer League announced that Ottawa had been awarded an expansion franchise. The team would join the league in 2014 once developments at Lansdowne Park were completed. In February 2013, the club ran a campaign to select a name and received over 4,000 submissions. Club president John Pugh announced that Ottawa Fury FC was chosen as the name.

On May 23, 2013, the club named Marc Dos Santos as the first head coach. Two days later, the official crest was revealed at an event open to season ticket holders and supporters groups. In the final months leading up to the 2014 season, the club also named Martin Nash as assistant coach, David Bellemare as goalkeeping coach and Philip Dos Santos as technical director.

=== North American Soccer League (2014–2016) ===
With Lansdowne Park not ready for the 2014 spring season, the club agreed a short-term deal to play at Keith Harris Stadium. After going unbeaten in five pre-season friendlies, Ottawa Fury lost 2–0 at the Fort Lauderdale Strikers in their first competitive match on April 12, 2014. The club finished the spring season in sixth with three wins from nine games. Ottawa Fury moved into Lansdowne Park ahead of the fall season, and lost 1–0 to the New York Cosmos in their first match at the new stadium on July 20. After failing to record a win in their first six matches of the 2014 fall season, the club finished in eighth place.

Ottawa Fury added Chelsea academy coach Darko Buser to the club's management team for the 2015 season, and after another unbeaten pre-season in 2015, ended the 2015 spring season in ninth place. The club saw great improvement for the 2015 fall season, and were crowned champions with 45 points from 20 games and sitting six points clear of Minnesota United. Ottawa beat Minnesota in extra time with a 2–1 victory in the Soccer Bowl semi-final, but lost 3–2 to the New York Cosmos in the final a week later.

In November 2015, Marc Dos Santos stepped down as head coach to join Sporting Kansas City as assistant coach having announced his intentions to the club two months earlier. On November 20, the club named Paul Dalglish as his replacement. The following month, Philip Dos Santos left his position as technical director and was replaced by Buser. A third consecutive unbeaten pre-season campaign followed, but the club could only manage a ninth-place finish in the 2016 spring season with nine points from a possible 30. Ottawa Fury finished the 2016 fall season bottom of the table amidst rumours the club would leave the North American Soccer League.

=== USL Championship (2017–2019) ===
On October 25, 2016, the club announced that they would join the United Soccer League for the 2017 season. At the time of the announcement, it had been reported that the Fury were losing up to $2 million per year while operating in the North American Soccer League.

In December 2016, the Montreal Impact announced an affiliation agreement with Ottawa Fury after disbanding their reserve side FC Montreal. The club remained eligible for the Canadian Championship.

On August 14, 2017, Dalglish left his role at Ottawa Fury. Club president John Pugh announced that Dalglish had informed him of his intention to leave the club for personal reasons, and two days later the club and Dalglish decided to mutually part ways. Former player and current assistant coach Julian de Guzman took over as interim head coach for the remainder of the season. The Fury ended their first United Soccer League campaign in 10th place, missing out on the Conference Playoffs by six points.

On December 21, 2017, the club announced that Nikola Popović would take over as their new head coach. De Guzman remained with the club as general manager.

On September 5, 2018, Mark Goudie, president and CEO of Ottawa Sports and Entertainment Group, officially dispelled rumours about the club joining the Canadian Premier League (CPL) for the league's first season in 2019, citing the stability of the USL as their reason to remain there. Goudie, however, stated that the club supports the CPL's mission of expanding soccer in Canada, and did not rule out joining it in the future. On December 12, 2018, the Canadian Soccer Association (CSA) received a letter from CONCACAF, stating that the Ottawa Fury's sanctioning to play in the 2019 USL Championship season would be revoked, despite the club receiving approval from both the CSA and the United States Soccer Federation (USSF). On December 13, 2018, CONCACAF released a statement saying that they "never received a formal request from any party to consider sanctioning the participation of the Ottawa Fury in the 2019 season of the USL, despite public announcements by Ottawa Fury that it would be doing so". CONCACAF additionally stated that the launch of the CPL precludes the "exceptional circumstances" provision which allowed Canadian clubs to participate in USSF-sanctioned leagues. On December 19, 2018, OSEG filed for arbitration with the Court of Arbitration for Sport in an attempt to reinstate the Fury's sanctioning in the USL. Two days later, the club revealed that it would be allowed to continue to play in the USL for the 2019 season.

In the 2019 season, the Fury reached the play-offs for the first time since joining the USL. Their play-off run, however, only lasted one game as they were knocked out in the play-in round by the Charleston Battery, who advanced on penalties. One week later, on October 30, the Fury announced they would not be renewing the contract of head coach Nikola Popović.

On November 8, 2019 the Fury announced that they had not been sanctioned to play in the USL Championship for the 2020 season and would be suspending operations. The team had received sanctioning from Canada Soccer, but not from the USSF and CONCACAF. On December 11, the Fury announced the sale of its franchise rights to the ownership group of Miami FC, with Miami set to participate in the 2020 USL Championship season.

== Stadium ==
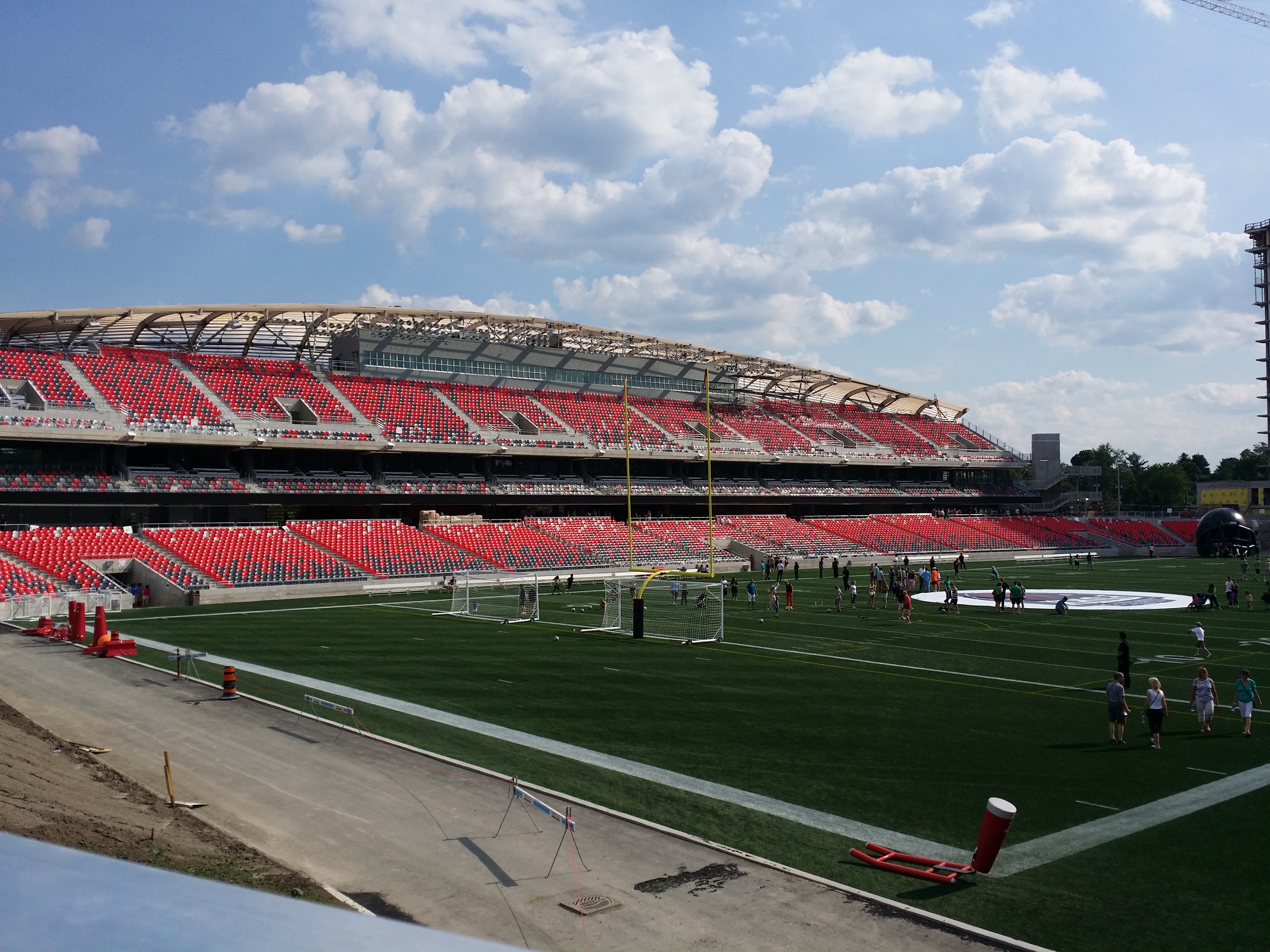
TD Place Stadium in 2014

- Keith Harris Stadium; Ottawa, Ontario (2014)
- TD Place Stadium; Ottawa, Ontario (2014–2019)

In order to join the North American Soccer League, Ottawa Fury planned to compete at Lansdowne Park for the 2014 season. After delays in the stadium developments, the club reached an agreement with Carleton University to play five games at Keith Harris Stadium on the university campus until construction was completed. In July 2014, the Fury moved into their new stadium in time for the 2014 fall season. The stadium is also known as TD Place Stadium due to sponsorship reasons. The club share the stadium with the Ottawa Redblacks, a Canadian Football League team, and the two teams played their opening games on the same weekend.

The stadium was one of six chosen to host matches for the 2015 FIFA Women's World Cup, and hosted a total of nine matches from the group stages to the quarter-finals.

== Crest and colours ==
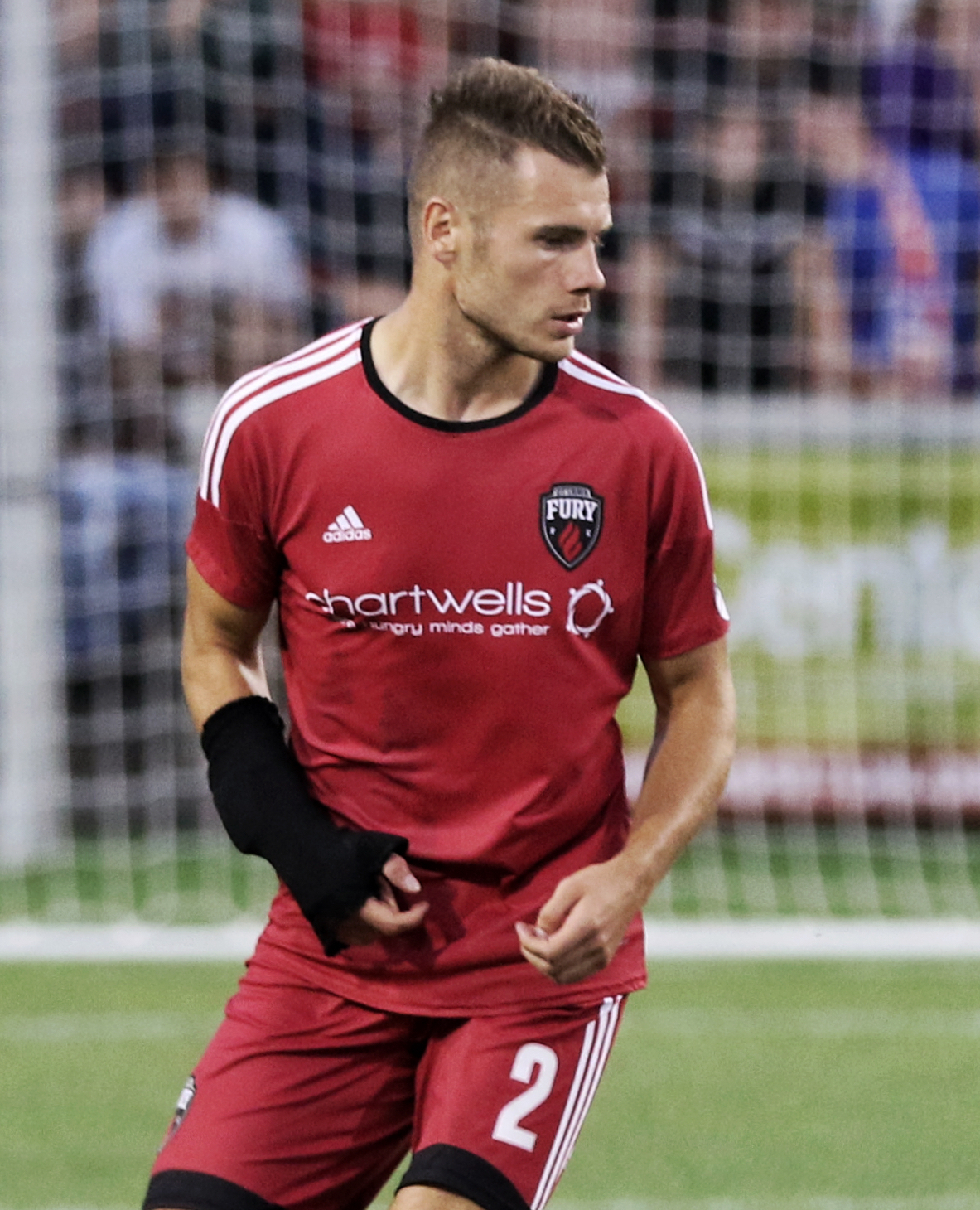
Jonathan Barden in Ottawa Fury colours in 2017

On May 25, 2013, the club's official crest was revealed at an event open to season ticket holders and supporters groups. The crest was a traditional soccer shield design that included the club's name and a flame used as a symbol of the club. The official club colours are red, black and white.

In late 2013, over 1,500 supporters took part in a campaign to help pick one of three designs to become the club's first kits. They were unveiled ahead of the inaugural North American Soccer League season in March 2014. Both the primary and secondary kit featured the traditional colours of Ottawa sport.

== Club culture ==
=== Supporters ===
The Bytown Boys Supporters Club was formed in April 2011 in response to news of an expansion Canadian Soccer League franchise being awarded to Ottawa. Originally known as the Capital City Supporters Group, the club showed support for Capital City until they announced they would no longer compete in the league in March 2012. The following month, it was announced that the group had reached an agreement with the Ottawa Fury, a Premier Development League club who would become a North American Soccer League expansion team in the near future. In 2013, the Bytown Boys also showed support for the Ottawa Fury Women in the USL W-League. The group continued to support Ottawa Fury as they joined the North American Soccer League in 2014, and the United Soccer League three years later.

In August 2013, the Stony Monday Riot was formed in preparation for the club's inaugural season in the North American Soccer League. The group try to bring together supporters of all backgrounds to experience full participation in every match. As well as Ottawa Fury, the Stony Monday Riot show support for soccer at all levels in the National Capital Region.

=== Mascot ===
Sparky, Ottawa Fury's mascot, is based on the flame symbol introduced in the club's original crest design. Big Joe, the mascot of the Ottawa Redblacks, and Riley, the mascot of the Ottawa 67's, have also made appearances at the club with all three teams part of the Ottawa Sports and Entertainment Group.

=== Rivalries ===
During their time in the North American Soccer League, Ottawa Fury's main rivalry was with FC Edmonton, the only other Canadian team competing in the league when they joined in 2014. The meetings between the two sides were named "The Battle of Canada" and occurred in both the league and the Canadian Championship. The two teams met every year in the preliminary round over two legs, with the first ever meeting ending in a goalless draw on April 23, 2014. A week later, the Fury suffered a 3–1 defeat to FC Edmonton with Vini Dantas scoring Ottawa's only goal. On May 31, Ottawa Fury beat FC Edmonton 1–0 in the first league meeting between the two sides with Tom Heinemann scoring a last minute goal.

== Players and staff ==
=== Staff ===
As of October 30, 2019

Executive staff
President	John Pugh
General manager	Julian de Guzman
Assistant general manager	Carrie McKay
Coaching staff
Head coach	Nikola Popović
Assistant coach	Victor Oppong
Goalkeeping coach	Carlos Lima
Head physician	Lindsay Bradley
Head athletic therapist	Adrian Huynh
Assistant athletic therapist	Michael Garcia
Equipment manager	Nic Mossop

=== Head coaches ===
As of October 31, 2019

Coach	From	To	Record				
Coach	From	To	G	W	D	L	Win %
(Canada) Marc Dos Santos	May 23, 2013	November 20, 2015	63	23	18	22	36.51
(Scotland) Paul Dalglish	November 20, 2015	August 15, 2017	60	19	16	25	31.67
(Canada) Julian de Guzman (interim)	August 15, 2017	December 21, 2017	12	1	8	3	8.33
(Serbia) Nikola Popović	December 21, 2017	October 31, 2019	81	30	17	34	37.04

Record includes league, playoff, and Canadian Championship games.

== Broadcasting ==
During the club's inaugural season in the North American Soccer League, all home matches were televised on Rogers TV Ottawa. Home and away matches were broadcast on the radio in English on TSN 1200, and select home matches were broadcast in French on 94,5 Unique FM.

All matches were broadcast on Rogers TV for the 2017 season, and the USL Match Centre provided coverage for all league matches. Radio broadcasts included every game in English, and all home games in French. The following season, it was announced that every home game would be streamed online on Fury TV and all league matches would remain available on the USL Match Centre. All home matches were broadcast on radio in both English and French.

== Honours ==
=== North American Soccer League ===
- Fall Championship
  - Champions: 2015
- Soccer Bowl
  - Runners-up: 2015
- North American Supporters' Trophy
  - Runners-up: 2015
- Fair Play Award
  - Winners: 2015

== Record ==
=== Year-by-year ===
Year	Div.	League	GP	W	D	L	GF	GA	Pts	Pos	Playoffs	Canadian Championship	League Attendance	Top Scorer		Ref
Year	Div.	League	GP	W	D	L	GF	GA	Pts	Pos	Playoffs	Canadian Championship	League Attendance	Name	Gls	Ref
2014	2	NASL	27	7	6	14	34	38	27	8th	did not qualify	Preliminary Round	4,492	(Brazil) Oliver	7	
2015	2	NASL	30	15	11	4	42	23	56	2nd	Runners-up	Preliminary Round	5,164	(United States) Tom Heinemann	8	
2016	2	NASL	32	7	10	15	32	40	31	10th	did not qualify	Semi-finals	5,482	(Canada) Carl Haworth	7	
2017	2	USL	32	8	14	10	42	41	38	10th	did not qualify	Semi-finals	5,365	(Cape Verde) Steevan Dos Santos	10	
2018	2	USL	34	13	6	15	31	43	45	10th	did not qualify	Semi-finals	4,752	(Cape Verde) Steevan Dos Santos (Panama) Tony Taylor	5	
2019	2	USLC	34	14	10	10	50	43	52	8th	Play-in round	Semi-finals	4,555	(Germany) Wal Fall (Canada) Carl Haworth	10	

Note: Only league goals counted for top scorer

=== Top goalscorers ===
As of October 23, 2019

#	Pos.	Name	Nation	Career	League	PO	CC	Total
1	Forward	Carl Haworth	Canada	2014–19	26	0	2	28
2	Forward	Tom Heinemann	United States	2014–15	14	4	0	18
3	Forward	Steevan Dos Santos	Cape Verde	2017–18	15	–	2	17
4	Forward	Oliver	Brazil	2014–15	9	0	1	10
4	Forward	Kévin Oliveira	Cape Verde	2018–19	10	0	0	10
4	Midfielder	Wal Fall	Germany	2019	10	0	0	10
7	Midfielder	Siniša Ubiparipović	Bosnia and Herzegovina	2014–15	9	0	0	9
7	Midfielder	Ryan Williams	England	2016–17	7	–	2	9
7	Forward	Christiano François	Haiti	2019	8	0	1	9
10	Forward	Sito Seoane	United States	2017–18	6	–	2	8
10	Forward	Mour Samb	Senegal	2019	7	1	0	8

=== Most appearances ===
As of October 24, 2019

#	Pos.	Name	Nation	Career	League	PO	CC	Total
1	Forward	Carl Haworth	Canada	2014–19	159	2	14	174
2	Midfielder	Jamar Dixon	Canada	2016–19	87	0	10	97
3	Defender	Onua Obasi	England	2016–19	82	1	13	96
4	Defender	Eddie Edward	Canada	2016–18	71	–	8	79
4	Goalkeeper	Romuald Peiser	France	2014–16	73	2	4	79
6	Goalkeeper	Callum Irving	Canada	2017–19	65	1	8	74
7	Forward	Kévin Oliveira	Cape Verde	2018–19	64	1	8	73
8	Defender	Rafael Alves	Brazil	2015–16	61	2	5	68
8	Midfielder	Chris Mannella	Canada	2018–19	59	1	8	68
10	Defender	Thomas Meilleur-Giguère	Canada	2017–19	57	1	8	66

=== Individual awards ===
==== North American Soccer League ====
Season	Award	Name	Position
2015	June Player of the Month	(France) Romuald Peiser	Goalkeeper
2015	September Player of the Month	(France) Romuald Peiser	Goalkeeper
2015	Best XI	(France) Romuald Peiser	Goalkeeper
2015	Best XI	(Brazil) Rafael Alves	Defender
2015	Best XI	(Republic of Ireland) Richie Ryan	Midfielder
2015	Golden Glove	(France) Romuald Peiser	Goalkeeper
2015	Humanitarian of the Year	(Canada) Drew Beckie	Defender
2015	Coach of the Year	(Canada) Marc Dos Santos	Coach
