= List of Love Is Blind: UK participants =

The following is a list of individuals who have appeared on the Netflix reality series Love Is Blind: UK.

== Participants ==
Season	Name	Age	Occupation	Hometown	Result
1
1	Jasmine Chamberlain	29	Mental Health Nurse	London, England	Married
1	Bobby Johnson	33	Luxury Shopping Guide	Staffordshire, England	Married
1	Nicole Stevens	29	Head of Brand and Marketing	Surrey, England	Split after the Reunion
1	Benaiah Grunewald Brydie	33	Structural Landscaper	Preston, England	Split after the Reunion
1	Sabrina Egerton	35	Director of Marketing and Communications	Belfast, Northern Ireland	Split after the Wedding
1	Steven Smith	37	Gym Owner	London, England	Split after the Wedding
1	Demi Brown	30	Safeguarding and Attendance Manager	London, England	Split at the altar
1	Ollie Sutherland	33	Software Sales	London, England	Split at the altar
1	Catherine Richards	29	Dental Nurse	Jersey, Channel Islands	Split at the altar
1	Freddie Powell	32	Funeral Director	Bolton, England	Split at the altar
1	Maria Benkhermaz	30	Makeup Artist	Southampton, England	Split at the altar
1	Tom Stroud	38	PR and Advertising Consultant	London, England	Split at the altar
1	Sam Klein	31	Product Design Manager	London, England	Briefly engaged to Nicole; split before the wedding
1	Olivia Lavelle	28	Creative Project Director	London, England	Briefly engaged off-camera, split before the wedding
1	Conor Griffin	31	Health Food Business Owner	Dublin, Republic of Ireland	Briefly engaged off-camera, split before the wedding
1	Aaron Murrell	33	Chicken Restaurateur	Milton Keynes, England	Not engaged
1	Charlie Mawson	34	Gym General Manager	Hertfordshire, England	Not engaged
1	Ella Liliana	27	Social Worker	Derbyshire, England	Not engaged
1	Elle	27	Graphic Designer	London, England	Not engaged
1	Jake Singleton-Hill	32	Civil Engineer	Leicestershire, England	Not engaged
1	Joanes	31	Resident Service Manager	Luton, England	Not engaged
1	Jordan Baker	32	Fashion Tech Founder	Surrey, England	Not engaged
1	Lisa Hendrie	34	Baby Photographer	Edinburgh, Scotland	Not engaged
1	Natasha Waters	32	Careers Coordinator	Cheshire, England	Not engaged
1	Priyanka "Priya" Grewal	37	Procurement Manager	Berkshire, England	Not engaged
1	Ria Prosser	34	Commercial Contracts Manager	London, England	Not engaged
1	Richie	30	Sports Turf Maintenance Director	Gloucestershire, England	Not engaged
1	Ryan Williams	31	Techno DJ and Cellist	Edinburgh, Scotland	Not engaged
1	Sharlotte Ritchie	35	Global Communications Director	London, England	Not engaged
1	Shirley Bekker	27	Junior Doctor	London, England	Not engaged
2
2	Kieran Holmes-Darby	28	Gaming Entrepreneur	London, England	Married
2	Megan Jupp	28	Dance and Fitness Instructor	London, England	Married
2	Ashleigh Berry	30	Cabin Crew Manager	Surrey, England	Split after the wedding
2	Billy Jervis	35	Army Physical Trainer	Bangor, Northern Ireland	Split after the wedding
2	Kal Pasha	32	Gym Owner	Wigan, England	Split after the wedding
2	Sarover Aujla	29	Medical Company Owner	Buckinghamshire, England	Split after the wedding
2	Bardha Krasniqi	32	Sales and Marketing Director	London, England	Split at the altar
2	Jed Chouman	31	Configuration Manager	Essex, England	Split at the altar
2	Katisha Atkinson	31	Nanny and Makeup Artist	Dumfries, Scotland	Split before the wedding
2	Javen Palmer	28	Health Coach	Kent, England	Split before the wedding
2	Aanu	29	Singer	Essex, England	Not engaged
2	Amy Jane	33	Primary School Teacher	Brecon, Wales	Not engaged
2	Charlie Antony	28	Electrical Engineer	Essex, England	Not engaged
2	Chris O'Byrne	33	Project Manager	Sussex, England	Not engaged
2	Christine Hogan	35	Human Resources Operations Lead	Athlacca, Republic of Ireland	Not engaged
2	Danielle Kelly	33	Estate Agent	Portsmouth, England	Not engaged
2	Demola Mann	31	Financial Analyst	Essex, England	Not engaged
2	Holly Kingdon	30	Private Chef	London, England	Not engaged
2	Jack Rogers	33	App Creator and Founder	London, England	Not engaged
2	James Clark	36	Real Estate Manager	Skegness, England	Not engaged
2	Jordan	29	Lift Engineer	Bristol, England	Not engaged
2	Laurie Marie	37	Interior Stylist	London, England	Not engaged
2	Loll Sturgess	31	Sales Account Manager	Bedfordshire, England	Not engaged
2	Patrick Justus	33	Human Design Coach	London, England	Not engaged
2	Ross B	32	Builder	Dunstable, England	Not engaged
2	Ross Millington	30	Barber Shop Owner	Cheshire, England	Not engaged
2	Sophie Willett	28	Senior Commercial Manager	Manchester, England	Not engaged
2	Tara Mason	33	Café Owner	Wicklow, Republic of Ireland	Not engaged
2	Tom Jackson	35	Retired Pub Landlord	London, England	Not engaged
2	Yolanda	26	Specialist Occupational Therapist	Hampshire, England	Not engaged
3
3	Name	Age	Occupation	Hometown	Relationship Status
3	Sophie Tregaskiss	27	Operations Team Leader	Greater Manchester, England	Married
3	Taylor Burgen	31	Head of Sales	Hertfordshire, England	Married
3	Ciara Murphy	29	Pilates Instructor	London, England	Married
3	Ajay Cheema	33	Fitness Coach	London, England	Married
3	Faye Domaille	28	Executive Assistant	London, England	Married
3	Jack Bradshaw	30	Chef	Cornwall, England	Married
3	Francesca Emmanuel	29	HR Associate	London, England	Married
3	Joseph Subuola	33	Senior Project Manager	London, England	Married
3	Cuba Riggs	29	Yoga and Fitness Instructor	London, England	Split before the wedding
3	Ryan Roberts	33	Public Speaker and Entrepreneur	Manchester, England	Split before the wedding
3	Yasmin Toseafa	32	Physician Associate	London, England	Split before the wedding
3	Jordan Taylor	29	Teacher	Birmingham, England	Split before the wedding
3	Alex Begyinah	33	Business Management Manager	Birmingham, England	Not engaged
3	Blue Braithwaite	32	Plasterer	London, England	Not engaged
3	Chevanique T	29	Sexual Health Nurse	Birmingham, England	Not engaged
3	George Morgan	32	Bank Relationship Manager and Wine Bar Owner	Derby, England	Not engaged
3	Hannah Connolly	27	Chartered Accountant	Leeds, England	Not engaged
3	Jacob	32	Business Owner	Colchester, England	Not engaged
3	Jonathan Harrold	32	Tech Recruiter	Hertfordshire, England	Not engaged
3	Katie Linsky	30	Project Manager	Doncaster, England	Not engaged
3	Komel Waqar	34	Senior Finance Officer	Glasgow, Scotland	Not engaged
3	Luke Watson	29	Planning Officer	Doncaster, England	Not engaged
3	Lydia James	31	Senior Product Manager	Cardiff, Wales	Not engaged
3	Met Emir	35	Technology Recruiter	London	Not engaged
3	Mike Mitchell	31	Teaching Assistant	Preston, England	Not engaged
3	Monum	29	Audiologist	Bury, England	Not engaged
3	Nieve Ewing	27	Car Salesperson	Perth, Scotland	Not engaged
3	Sammy Harper	31	Wellbeing Coach and Entrepreneur	Manchester, England	Not engaged
3	Si Bucknell	36	Motorsport Technician	Gloucestershire, England	Not engaged
Zelania Ann-Marie	29	Marketing Manager	London, England		Not engaged

== Post Filming ==
Season	Couples	Married	Still Together?	Status
1
1	Bobby and Jasmine	Yes	Yes	Bobby and Jasmine got married. In the reunion filmed one year later, it was revealed that Bobby had moved to London and they were still together. In June 2025, they announced that they were pregnant with a boy.
1	Benaiah and Nicole	Yes	Yes	The couple became engaged after the pods and met the rest of the couples in Corfu. Despite the false start Benaiah and Nicole got married. At the reunion it was revealed they were still together and living with each other. In October 2026, Nicole announced that they had separated.
1	Steven and Sabrina	Yes	No	Steven and Sabrina got married. In the reunion filmed one year later, it was revealed that Steven and Sabrina were no longer together. Their issues had been compounded by a long-distance relationship.
1	Freddie and Catherine	No	No	They did not get married. Catherine said yes, but Freddie felt the time was not right for them. After she left, he told her family that he still wanted her in his life. She, however, said it would take a lot for her to "bounce back".
1	Ollie and Demi	No	No	After a lack of contact before the wedding, Demi chose not to marry Ollie at the altar. Ollie asked her why, and she stated it was an "I do not, for now", rather than a firm no. At the reunion it was revealed they had not pursued the relationship.
1	Tom and Maria	No	No	Split on wedding day. Tom said no, stating that they had some differences, which he hadn't had enough time to work through. Maria would have said yes. At the reunion it was revealed that their differences had not been resolved.
1	Sam and Nicole	No	No	They got engaged but did not go to Corfu with the rest of the couples. They both separately confessed to not feeling the connection in the real world and thus ended their engagement.
2
2	Kieran and Megan	Yes	Yes	Kieran and Megan got married. At the reunion, filmed one year later, it was revealed that they were still together and living with each other.
2	Billy and Ashleigh	Yes	No	Billy and Ashleigh got married. At the reunion, it was revealed that they had gotten divorced in January 2025 due to personal differences and a lack of compatibility.
2	Kal and Sarover	Yes	No	Kal and Sarover got married. At the reunion, it was revealed that they had separated in January 2025. Kal made the decision as he felt they were incompatible, the spark was gone, and they had grown into different people. The breakup came as a shock to Sarover.
2	Jed and Bardha	No	No	They did not get married, as Bardha said no at the altar. She did, however, reassure Jed that she still wanted to be in a relationship and this was not a firm rejection, but rather a “when we’re ready”. At the reunion, it was revealed that they had briefly dated after the wedding, but ultimately broke up.
2	Javen and Katisha	No	No	They split up shortly after the mixer. Javen allegedly spent the after-party with Aanu, Yolanda, and Sophie. He never mentioned this to Katisha, who instead heard it from Megan, and promptly ended the engagement.
3
3	Taylor and Sophie	Yes	Yes	Taylor and Sophie got married in 2025. At the reunion, they revealed that they were still together and had moved together in Hertfordshire.
3	Ajay and Ciara	Yes	Yes	Ajay and Ciara got married in 2025. At the reunion, they revealed that they were still together and in the process of planning their "big, fat Indian wedding".
3	Jack and Faye	Yes	Yes	Jack and Faye got married in 2025. At the reunion, they revealed they were still together.
3	Joseph and Francesca	Yes	Yes	Joseph and Francesca got married in 2025. At the reunion, they revealed that they were still together and were planning to have a traditional Nigerian wedding as well.
3	Ryan and Cuba	No	No	They split up shortly after Ryan returned to the experiment as he was uncertain about his feelings.
Jordan and Yasmin	No	No	They split up shortly after the mixer as Jordan did not feel he would fall in love with Yasmin by the time of the wedding. At the reunion, they revealed they had since become best-friends.	
