= 2015 Ottawa Fury FC season =

Ottawa Fury FC
2015 season
- President: John Pugh
- Head Coach: Marc Dos Santos
- Stadium: TD Place Stadium
- NASL: Spring: 9th Fall: Winners Combined: 2nd
- Soccer Bowl: Runners-up
- Canadian Championship: Preliminary Round
- Top goalscorer: League: Tom Heinemann (8); All: Tom Heinemann (12)
- Highest home attendance: 9,346 (8 November v. Minnesota United)
- Lowest home attendance: 2,402 (22 April v. Edmonton)
- Average home league attendance: 5,164
Home colours	Away colours

The 2015 Ottawa Fury FC season was the club's second season at the professional level in the North American Soccer League.

== Club ==
=== Staff ===
Marc Dos Santos and other staff members would retain their positions from the previous season. Shortly after the conclusion of the 2014 season, the club announced the addition of longtime Chelsea academy coach Darko Buser to the club's management team.

=== Roster changes ===
On November 26, 2014, the club announced it would release four players; defenders Ramón Soria and Kenny Caceros, as well as forwards Pierre-Rudolph Mayard and Vini Dantas. On March 13, 2015 the club announced it and defender Omar Jarun had mutually parted ways.

== Squad ==
As of match played 15 November 2015

No.	Name	Nationality	Position	Date of birth (age)	Signed from	Signed in	Apps.	Goals
Goalkeepers
1	Romuald Peiser (vc)	(France)	GK	3 August 1979 (aged 36)	(Portugal) Académica	2014	48	0
12	Waleed Cassis	(Canada)	GK	3 March 1992 (aged 23)	(United States) Buffalo	2015	0	0
24	Marcel DeBellis	(Canada)	GK	17 April 1991 (aged 24)	(Italy) Ascoli	2014	1	0
Defenders
2	Ryan Richter	(United States)	DF	12 April 1989 (aged 26)	Toronto	2015	49	0
3	Mason Trafford	(Canada)	DF	21 August 1986 (aged 29)	(China) Guizhou Zhicheng	2014	57	1
4	Drew Beckie	(Canada)	DF	30 September 1990 (aged 25)	(United States) Columbus Crew	2014	37	0
32	Colin Falvey	(Republic of Ireland)	CB	20 June 1985 (aged 30)	(United States) Charleston Battery	2015	34	0
33	Rafael Alves	(Brazil)	DF	18 January 1985 (aged 30)	(United States) Fort Lauderdale Strikers	2015	33	4
Midfielders
5	Jérémy Gagnon-Laparé	(Canada)	MF	9 March 1995 (aged 20)	Loan from Montreal Impact	2015	3	0
6	Richie Ryan (c)	(Republic of Ireland)	CM	6 January 1985 (aged 30)	(Republic of Ireland) Shamrock Rovers	2013	45	4
8	Nicki Paterson	(Scotland)	CM	19 January 1985 (aged 30)	(United States) Charleston Battery	2013	26	4
10	Siniša Ubiparipović	(Bosnia and Herzegovina)	CM	25 August 1983 (aged 32)	Montreal Impact	2014	53	9
18	Brandon Poltronieri	(Costa Rica)	MF	18 January 1986 (aged 29)	(United States) Atlanta Silverbacks	2015	17	1
19	Emad Houache	(Canada)	MF	4 September 1994 (aged 21)	Academy	2015	0	0
20	Mauro Eustáquio	(Canada)	CM	18 February 1993 (aged 22)	(Portugal) Sporting Pombal	2013	31	2
25	Julian de Guzman	(Canada)	CM	25 March 1981 (aged 34)	(Greece) Skoda Xanthi	2015	17	0
26	Jonathan Vallée	(Canada)	MF	22 April 1995 (aged 20)	Academy	2015	0	0
28	Jeff Addai	(Canada)	MF	11 May 1993 (aged 22)	Academy	2015	0	0
Forwards
7	Paulo Jr.	(Brazil)	W	23 January 1989 (aged 26)	(Brazil) Náutico	2015	31	4
9	Tom Heinemann	(United States)	CF	23 March 1987 (aged 28)	Vancouver Whitecaps	2014	49	18
11	Oliver Minatel	(Brazil)	FW	29 August 1992 (aged 23)	(Brazil) Velo Clube	2013	49	10
14	Aly Hassan	(United States)	CF	15 May 1989 (aged 26)	(United States) Fort Lauderdale Strikers	2015	12	3
16	Mohamed Dagnogo	(Canada)	FW	8 May 1995 (aged 20)	Academy	2015	0	0
17	Carl Haworth	(Canada)	FW	9 July 1989 (aged 26)	Ottawa Fury (PDL)	2013	54	4
23	Andrew Wiedeman	(United States)	FW	22 August 1989 (aged 26)	Toronto	2015	29	5
77	Uğur Albayrak	(Turkey)	FW	8 June 1988 (aged 27)	(Germany) Eintracht Trier	2015	6	0

== Transfers ==
=== In ===
Date	Position	Nationality	Name	From	Fee
18 December 2014	FW	(Brazil)	Paulo Jr.	(Brazil) Náutico	Free
14 January 2015	DF	(United States)	Mike Randolph	(United States) Atlanta Silverbacks	Free
22 January 2015	DF	(Brazil)	Rafael Alves	(United States) Fort Lauderdale Strikers	Free
26 January 2015	FW	(United States)	Andrew Wiedeman	Toronto	Free
28 January 2015	DF	(United States)	Ryan Richter	Toronto	Free
4 February 2015	DF	(Republic of Ireland)	Colin Falvey	(United States) Charleston Battery	Free
6 February 2015	MF	(Canada)	Patryk Misik	(Poland) Śląsk Wrocław	Free
11 February 2015	MF	(Costa Rica)	Brandon Poltronieri	(United States) Atlanta Silverbacks	Free
28 March 2015	MF	(Canada)	Julian de Guzman	Unattached	Free
12 May 2015	GK	(Canada)	Waleed Cassis	(United States) Buffalo	Free
26 June 2015	FW	(United States)	Aly Hassan	(United States) Fort Lauderdale Strikers	Undisclosed
4 August 2015	FW	(Turkey)	Uğur Albayrak	(Germany) Eintracht Trier	Free
6 October 2015	MF	(Canada)	Jérémy Gagnon-Laparé	Montreal Impact	Loan
6 October 2015	MF	(Canada)	Jeff Addai	Academy	
6 October 2015	MF	(Canada)	Emad Houache	Academy	
6 October 2015	MF	(Canada)	Jonathan Vallée	Academy	

=== Out ===
Date	Position	Nationality	Name	To	Fee
1 December 2014	GK	(Canada)	Chad Bush	Unattached	
1 December 2014	MF	(United States)	Tony Donatelli	Unattached	
1 December 2014	DF	(Canada)	Kenny Caceros	Unattached	
1 December 2014	DF	(United States)	Ryan Richter	Toronto	End of Loan
1 December 2014	FW	(Canada)	Pierre-Rudolph Mayard	L'Assomption	Free
23 February 2015	DF	(Spain)	Ramón Soria	(Slovenia) Celje	Free
25 February 2015	GK	(United States)	Devala Gorrick	(United States) Colorado Springs	Free
1 March 2015	DF	(Jamaica)	O'Brian Woodbine	(United States) Charleston Battery	Free
13 March 2015	DF	(Palestine)	Omar Jarun	(India) Bharat	Free
16 March 2015	FW	(Brazil)	Vini Dantas	(United States) Pittsburgh Riverhounds	Free
23 June 2015	MF	(Canada)	Patryk Misik	(Poland) Raków Częstochowa	Free
3 July 2015	DF	(United States)	Mike Randolph	Unattached	
19 August 2015	MF	(Canada)	Philippe Davies	Retired	

=== Trial ===
Date From	Date To	Position	Nationality	Name	Last club	Signed?
March 2015	12 May 2015	GK	(Canada)	Waleed Cassis	(United States) Buffalo	Yes

== Pre-season ==
6 March 2015 Friendly	Toronto II	2 – 3	Ottawa Fury	Toronto, Ontario
	Hamilton	Report	Paulo Jr. Misik; Foschini	Stadium: Kia Training Centre

13 March 2015 Friendly	Ottawa Fury	1 – 1	Rochester Rhinos	Gatineau, Québec
10:45 EST (UTC−5)	Haworth 75'	Report	Lanteri 21'	Stadium: Branchaud-Brière Complex

20 March 2015 Friendly	Montreal	0 – 1	Ottawa Fury	Montréal, Québec
		Report	Wiedeman 1'	Stadium: Olympic Stadium

28 March 2015 Friendly	Syracuse University	0 – 1	Ottawa Fury	Syracuse, New York
		Report	Haworth 55'	Stadium: Syracuse University Soccer Stadium

31 March 2015 Friendly	Wake Forest University	1 – 2	Ottawa Fury	Winston-Salem, North Carolina
	Partain 83'	Report	Trafford 18'; Heinemann 53'	Stadium: W. Dennie Spry Soccer Stadium

== Competitions ==
=== Overview ===
Competition	Starting round	Final position	Record							
Competition	Starting round	Final position	Pld	W	D	L	GF	GA	GD	Win %
North American Soccer League	Matchday 1	2nd	30	15	11	4	42	23	+19	50.00
NASL Playoffs	Semi-finals	Runner-up	2	1	0	1	4	4	+0	50.00
Canadian Championship	Preliminary round	Preliminary round	2	0	0	2	2	6	−4	0.00
Total			34	16	11	7	48	33	+15	47.06

Source: Competitions

=== NASL Spring Season ===
==== Standings ====
Pos	Team	Pld	W	D	L	GF	GA	GD	Pts	Qualification
1	New York Cosmos (S)	10	5	5	0	18	9	+9	20	Playoffs
2	Tampa Bay Rowdies	10	5	4	1	15	9	+6	19	
3	Carolina RailHawks	10	3	5	2	15	10	+5	14	
4	Minnesota United	10	3	5	2	15	13	+2	14	
5	Indy Eleven	10	3	4	3	13	12	+1	13	
6	Jacksonville Armada	10	3	3	4	15	18	−3	12	
7	San Antonio Scorpions	10	3	3	4	11	15	−4	12	
8	Fort Lauderdale Strikers	10	3	2	5	12	13	−1	11	
9	Ottawa Fury	10	2	5	3	5	8	−3	11	
10	FC Edmonton	10	2	3	5	16	22	−6	9	
11	Atlanta Silverbacks	10	1	5	4	7	13	−6	8	

Source: NASL
Rules for classification: 1) points; 2) total goal differential; 3) total goals scored; 4) head-to-head record; 5) away goal differential; 6) away goals scored
(S) Spring season champion

==== Results summary ====
Overall								Home						Away					
Pld	W	D	L	GF	GA	GD	Pts	W	D	L	GF	GA	GD	W	D	L	GF	GA	GD
10	2	5	3	5	8	−3	11	2	2	1	3	3	0	0	3	2	2	5	−3

Last updated: July 7, 2015.
Source: Match reports

==== Results by round ====
Round	1	2	3	4	5	6	7	8	9	10
Ground	A	A	H	H	A	H	H	H	A	A
Result	L	D	W	L	L	D	W	D	D	D
Position	9	9	6	8	9	10	7	7	8	9

Updated to match(es) played on August 11, 2015. Source: Match reports
A = Away; H = Home; W = Win; D = Draw; L = Loss

==== Match reports ====
4 April 2015 1	Carolina RailHawks	3 – 1	Ottawa Fury	Cary, North Carolina
13:00 EDT UTC−4	Shipalane 11'; Novo 29' (pen.); Albadawi (yellow card) 34'; Wagner (yellow card) 45'; Osaki (yellow card) 90'; Bracalello 90'	Report	Alves (yellow card) 15'; Beckie (yellow card) 16'; Richter (yellow card) 34'; Poltronieri 84'; Peiser (yellow card) 90' de Guzman (red card) 90'	Stadium: WakeMed Soccer Park; Attendance: 5,190; Referee: Robert Sibiga

11 April 2015 2	Atlanta Silverbacks	1 – 1	Ottawa Fury	Atlanta, Georgia
19:30 EDT UTC−4	Miller (yellow card) 33'; Porter 57'	Report	Poltronieri (yellow card) 29'; Paterson 34'; Beckie (yellow card) 89'	Stadium: Atlanta Silverbacks Park; Attendance: 3,841; Referee: Tyler Ploeger

18 April 2015 3	Ottawa Fury	1 – 0	Minnesota United	Ottawa, Ontario
15:00 EDT UTC−4	Falvey (yellow card) 24'; Heinemann 68'; Wiedeman (yellow card) 79'	Report	Ndjock (yellow card) 21'	Stadium: TD Place Stadium; Attendance: 5,093; Referee: Justin Tasev

25 April 2015 4	Ottawa Fury	1 – 3	Fort Lauderdale Strikers	Ottawa, Ontario
15:00 EDT UTC−4	Haworth (yellow card) 76'; Alves 78'	Report	Angulo 41', 90'; Freitas 64'; PC (yellow card) 69'	Stadium: TD Place Stadium; Attendance: 3,023; Referee: Yusri Rudolf

2 May 2015 5	New York Cosmos	1 – 0	Ottawa Fury	Brooklyn, New York
19:00 EDT UTC−4	Mkosana 14'; Blanco (yellow card) 87'; Pérez (yellow card) 87'	Report	Beckie (yellow card) 47'; Peiser (yellow card) 86'	Stadium: MCU Park; Attendance: 5,279; Referee: Baboucarr Jallow

9 May 2015 6	Ottawa Fury	0 – 0	Tampa Bay Rowdies	Ottawa, Ontario
15:00 EDT UTC−4	Falvey (yellow card) 49'	Report	King (yellow card) 56'	Stadium: TD Place Stadium; Attendance: 3,461; Referee: David Barrie

23 May 2015 7	Ottawa Fury	1 – 0	Indy Eleven	Ottawa, Ontario
15:00 EDT UTC−4	Beckie (yellow card) 22'; Poltronieri (yellow card) 37'; Paterson 88'; Ryan (yellow card) 90'	Report	Mares (yellow card) 45'	Stadium: TD Place Stadium; Attendance: 5,245; Referee: Mathieu Bourdeau

29 May 2015 8	Ottawa Fury	0 – 0	Edmonton	Ottawa, Ontario
19:00 EDT UTC−4	Trafford (yellow card) 84'	Report		Stadium: TD Place Stadium; Attendance: 5,064; Referee: Robert Schaap

7 June 2015 9	Jacksonville Armada	0 – 0	Ottawa Fury	Jacksonville, Florida
16:00 EDT UTC−4	Bahner (yellow card) 72'; Hrustic (yellow card) 83'	Report	Paulo Jr. (yellow card) 24'; Wiedeman (yellow card) 90'	Stadium: Community First Park; Attendance: 7,583; Referee: Mark Geiger

13 June 2015 10	San Antonio Scorpions	0 – 0	Ottawa Fury	San Antonio, Texas
20:30 EDT UTC−4	Nane (yellow card) 41'; Cann (yellow card) 45'	Report	Ubiparipović (yellow card) 77'	Stadium: Toyota Field; Attendance: 6,709; Referee: Mark Kadlecik

=== NASL Fall season ===
==== Standings ====
Pos	Team	Pld	W	D	L	GF	GA	GD	Pts	Qualification
1	Ottawa Fury (F)	20	13	6	1	37	15	+22	45	Playoffs
2	Minnesota United	20	11	6	3	39	26	+13	39	
3	New York Cosmos	20	10	6	4	31	21	+10	36	
4	Fort Lauderdale Strikers	20	8	6	6	37	27	+10	30	
5	FC Edmonton	20	7	5	8	25	24	+1	26	
6	Atlanta Silverbacks	20	6	7	7	24	27	−3	25	
7	Carolina RailHawks	20	6	3	11	29	39	−10	21	
8	Tampa Bay Rowdies	20	5	5	10	18	28	−10	20	
9	Indy Eleven	20	5	5	10	23	36	−13	20	
10	San Antonio Scorpions	20	4	7	9	30	37	−7	19	
11	Jacksonville Armada	20	5	4	11	18	31	−13	19	

Source: NASL
Rules for classification: 1) points; 2) total goal differential; 3) total goals scored; 4) head-to-head record; 5) away goal differential; 6) away goals scored
(F) Fall season champion

==== Results summary ====
Overall								Home						Away					
Pld	W	D	L	GF	GA	GD	Pts	W	D	L	GF	GA	GD	W	D	L	GF	GA	GD
20	13	6	1	37	15	+22	45	6	3	1	16	8	+8	7	3	0	21	7	+14

Last updated: October 31, 2015.
Source: Match reports

==== Results by round ====
Round	1	2	3	4	5	6	7	8	9	10	11	12	13	14	15	16	17	18	19	20
Ground	H	A	H	H	H	A	A	H	H	H	A	H	A	A	A	H	A	H	A	A
Result	W	D	W	W	W	W	W	L	D	D	W	D	W	W	W	W	D	W	W	D
Position	3	2	2	1	1	1	1	1	1	1	1	1	1	1	1	1	1	1	1	1

Updated to match(es) played on October 31, 2015. Source: Match reports
A = Away; H = Home; W = Win; D = Draw; L = Loss

==== Match reports ====
5 July 2015 1	Ottawa Fury	2 – 0	Jacksonville Armada	Ottawa, Ontario
15:00 EDT UTC−4	Trafford 13'; Ryan (yellow card) 76'; Heinemann 86'	Report	Trejo (yellow card) 20'; Keita (yellow card) 41'	Stadium: TD Place Stadium; Attendance: 6,150; Referee: Pierre-Luc Lauziere

11 July 2015 2	Minnesota United	1 – 1	Ottawa Fury	Blaine, Minnesota
20:00 EDT UTC−4	Ibson (yellow card) 15'; Ramirez 32'; Pitchkolan (yellow card) 81'; Calvano (yellow card) 89'	Report	Richter (yellow card) 10'; Eustaquio (yellow card) 31'; Heinemann 75' (pen.)	Stadium: NSC Stadium; Attendance: 9,030; Referee: Nima Saghafi

19 July 2015 3	Ottawa Fury	4 – 2	Indy Eleven	Ottawa, Ontario
15:00 EDT UTC−4	Alves 13'; Ryan 35', 65'; Heinemann 56'; Eustaquio (yellow card) 74'	Report	Smart (yellow card) 13', (goal) 33'; Hyland (yellow card) 16'; Miller (yellow card) 34' (yellow-red card) 89'; McKinney 90'	Stadium: TD Place Stadium; Attendance: 4,372; Referee: Yusri Rudolf

22 July 2015 4	Ottawa Fury	2 – 1	Atlanta Silverbacks	Ottawa, Ontario
19:00 EDT UTC−4	Haworth (yellow card) 43', (goal) 56'; Ryan 73' (pen.)	Report	Kimura (yellow card) 4'; Mravec (yellow card) 29'; Burgos 62' (pen.); Mensing (yellow card) 73'	Stadium: TD Place Stadium; Attendance: 3,459; Referee: Francis Latulippe

26 July 2015 5	Ottawa Fury	2 – 1	Carolina RailHawks	Ottawa, Ontario
15:00 EDT UTC−4	Hassan 20'; Haworth 90'	Report	Hlavaty (yellow card) 30'; Thompson (yellow card) 56' (yellow-red card) 56'; Novo 81'	Stadium: TD Place Stadium; Attendance: 5,175; Referee: Geoff Gamble

2 August 2015 6	Edmonton	0 – 1	Ottawa Fury	Fort McMurray, Alberta
16:00 EDT UTC−4	Watson (yellow card) 15'; Edward (yellow card) 53'	Report	Ubiparipović (yellow card) 2'; Alves 90'	Stadium: SMS Equipment Stadium; Attendance: 1,626; Referee: Robert Schaap

8 August 2015 7	Indy Eleven	1 – 4	Ottawa Fury	Indianapolis, Indiana
19:30 EDT UTC−4	Brown (yellow card) 22'; Lacroix 60'; Ceballos (yellow card) 73'	Report	Ubiparipović 9'; Trafford (yellow card) 17'; Alves (yellow card) 22'; Ryan (yellow card) 38'; Wiedeman 54', 64'; Eustaquio 62'; Richter (yellow card) 82'	Stadium: Michael A. Carroll Stadium; Attendance: 9,866; Referee: Tyler Ploeger

15 August 2015 8	Ottawa Fury	1 – 2	Minnesota United	Ottawa, Ontario
19:00 EDT UTC−4	Oliver (yellow card) 19'; Wiedeman 73'	Report	Tiago (yellow card) 11'; Ramirez 17'; Silva (yellow card) 40'; Vicentini (yellow card) 62'; Mendes (yellow card) 90', (goal) 90'	Stadium: TD Place Stadium; Attendance: 6,899; Referee: Lyes Arfa

26 August 2015 9	Ottawa Fury	0 – 0	New York Cosmos	Ottawa, Ontario
19:00 EDT UTC−4	Trafford (yellow card) 67'	Report	Moffat (yellow card) 55'; Freeman (yellow card) 90'	Stadium: TD Place Stadium; Attendance: 6,042; Referee: Chris Grabas

29 August 2015 10	Ottawa Fury	2 – 2	Tampa Bay Rowdies	Ottawa, Ontario
19:00 EDT UTC−4	Paulo Jr. 18'; Oliver 31'; Eustaquio (yellow card) 82'; Peiser (yellow card) 87'; Hassan (yellow card) 90'	Report	Mkandawire 33'; Espinal 87'	Stadium: TD Place Stadium; Attendance: 6,081; Referee: Marie-Soleil Beaudoin

5 September 2015 11	San Antonio Scorpions	0 – 1	Ottawa Fury	San Antonio, Texas
20:30 EDT UTC−4	Tsiskaridze (yellow card) 22' (yellow-red card) 38'; Attakora (yellow card) 55'; Castillo (yellow card) 85'	Report	Alves (yellow card) 45'; Oliver 50'	Stadium: Toyota Field; Attendance: 6,473; Referee: Nima Saghafi

12 September 2015 12	Ottawa Fury	0 – 0	Fort Lauderdale Strikers	Ottawa, Ontario
15:00 EDT UTC−4	Eustaquio (yellow card) 83'	Report	Chin (yellow card) 7'	Stadium: TD Place Stadium; Attendance: 6,327; Referee: Mathieu Bourdeau

19 September 2015 13	Fort Lauderdale Strikers	0 – 2	Ottawa Fury	Fort Lauderdale, Florida
19:30 EDT UTC−4	PC (yellow card) 64' (yellow-red card) 72'; Gabriel (yellow card) 66'	Report	Hassan 52'; Ubiparipović 81'	Stadium: Lockhart Stadium; Attendance: 3,773; Referee: Alex Chilcowicz

22 September 2015 14	New York Cosmos	1 – 4	Ottawa Fury	Hempstead, New York
19:30 EDT UTC−4	Senna (yellow card) 30'; Cellerino (yellow card) 42'; Flores 47'; Mendes (yellow card) 83'	Report	Paulo Jr. 31', 56'; Mendes 77' (o.g.); Heinemann 78'	Stadium: James M. Shuart Stadium; Attendance: 3,438; Referee: Tyler Ploeger

26 September 2015 15	Carolina RailHawks	1 – 3	Ottawa Fury	Cary, North Carolina
19:30 EDT UTC−4	Novo 51' (pen.), (yellow card) 52' (yellow-red card) 90'; Tobin (yellow card) 83'	Report	Heinemann 19', 33'; Paulo Jr. 45'; Peiser (yellow card) 70'	Stadium: WakeMed Soccer Park; Attendance: 3,374; Referee: Daniel Fitzgerald

4 October 2015 16	Ottawa Fury	2 – 0	Edmonton	Ottawa, Ontario
15:00 EDT UTC−4	Ubiparipović 23', 72', (yellow card) 80'; Richter (yellow card) 79'	Report		Stadium: TD Place Stadium; Attendance: 6,050; Referee: David Barrie

10 October 2015 17	Tampa Bay Rowdies	1 – 1	Ottawa Fury	St. Petersburg, Florida
19:30 EDT UTC−4	Guerra (yellow card) 17'; Adu (yellow card) 21'; King (yellow card) 65' (yellow-red card) 77'; Chavez (yellow card) 84'; Shriver 88'	Report	Heinemann 42'	Stadium: Al Lang Stadium; Attendance: 5,242; Referee: Daniel Redford

18 October 2015 18	Ottawa Fury	1 – 0	San Antonio Scorpions	Ottawa, Ontario
15:00 EDT UTC−4	Eustaquio 68'; Alves (yellow card) 90'; Peiser (yellow card) 90'	Report	Tyrpak (yellow card) 88'; Hassli (red card) 90'	Stadium: TD Place Stadium; Attendance: 5,023; Referee: Yusri Rudolph

21 October 2015 19	Jacksonville Armada	1 – 3	Ottawa Fury	Jacksonville, Florida
19:30 EDT UTC−4	Jérôme 37'	Report	Alves 59'; Ubiparipović 62'; Eustaquio (yellow card) 89'; Wiedeman 90'	Stadium: Community First Park; Attendance: 5,868; Referee: Marcos DeOliveira

31 October 2015 20	Atlanta Silverbacks	1 – 1	Ottawa Fury	Atlanta, Georgia
19:30 EDT UTC−4	Burgos 4'; Reed (yellow card) 42'	Report	Hassan 65'; Oliver (yellow card) 81'; Beckie (yellow card) 87'	Stadium: Atlanta Silverbacks Park; Attendance: 2,511; Referee: Edvin Jurisevic

=== NASL Combined Season ===
==== Standings ====
Pos	Team	Pld	W	D	L	GF	GA	GD	Pts	Qualification
1	New York Cosmos (C, X)	30	15	11	4	49	30	+19	56	Championship qualifiers (Note: As spring season champions)
2	Ottawa Fury	30	15	11	4	42	23	+19	56	Championship qualifiers (Note: As fall season champions)
3	Minnesota United	30	14	11	5	54	39	+15	53	Championship qualifiers (Note: As next best teams in overall standings)
4	Fort Lauderdale Strikers	30	11	8	11	49	40	+9	41	Championship qualifiers
5	Tampa Bay Rowdies	30	10	9	11	33	37	−4	39	
6	Carolina RailHawks	30	9	8	13	44	49	−5	35	
7	FC Edmonton	30	9	8	13	41	46	−5	35	
8	Atlanta Silverbacks	30	7	12	11	31	40	−9	33	
9	Indy Eleven	30	8	9	13	36	48	−12	33	
10	San Antonio Scorpions	30	7	10	13	41	52	−11	31	
11	Jacksonville Armada	30	8	7	15	33	49	−16	31	

Source: NASL
Rules for classification: 1) points; 2) total goal differential; 3) total goals scored; 4) head-to-head record; 5) away goal differential; 6) away goals scored
(C) Champions; (X) Regular season champion

==== Results summary ====
Overall								Home						Away					
Pld	W	D	L	GF	GA	GD	Pts	W	D	L	GF	GA	GD	W	D	L	GF	GA	GD
30	15	11	4	42	23	+19	56	8	5	2	19	11	+8	7	6	2	23	12	+11

Last updated: October 31, 2015.
Source: Match reports

==== Results by round ====
Round	1	2	3	4	5	6	7	8	9	10	11	12	13	14	15	16	17	18	19	20	21	22	23	24	25	26	27	28	29	30
Ground	A	A	H	H	A	H	H	H	A	A	H	A	H	H	H	A	A	H	H	H	A	A	A	A	A	H	A	H	A	A
Result	L	D	W	L	L	D	W	D	D	D	W	D	W	W	W	W	W	L	D	D	W	D	W	W	W	W	D	W	W	D
Position	9	9	6	8	9	10	7	7	8	9	6	6	5	4	1	1	1	2	2	2	2	3	3	2	1	1	2	1	1	2

Updated to match(es) played on October 31, 2015. Source: Match reports
A = Away; H = Home; W = Win; D = Draw; L = Loss

=== Soccer Bowl ===
8 November 2015 Semi-finals	Ottawa Fury	2 – 1 (a.e.t.)	Minnesota United	Ottawa, Ontario
15:00 EST UTC−5	Heinemann (yellow card) 9', (goal) 57', 108'; Trafford (yellow card) 104'	Report	Tiago (yellow card) 2'; Ramirez 7' (pen.); Ibson (yellow card) 45'; Mendes (yellow card) 45+'; Vicentini (yellow card) 100'; Jordan (yellow card) 120+'	Stadium: TD Place Stadium; Attendance: 9,346; Referee: Mathieu Bordeau

15 November 2015 Final	New York Cosmos	3 – 2	Ottawa Fury	Hempstead, New York
15:00 EST UTC−5	Cellerino (yellow card) 7', (goal) 8', 72', 85'; Maurer (yellow card) 41'; Guenzatti (yellow card) 60'	Report	Trafford (red card) 68'; Heinemann 70', 90+3'; Falvey (yellow card) 76'; Ryan (yellow card) 76'	Stadium: Shuart Stadium; Attendance: 10,166; Referee: Alan Kelly

=== Canadian Championship ===
22 April 2015 Preliminary Round	Ottawa Fury	1 – 3	Edmonton	Ottawa, Ontario
19:30 EST UTC−5	Oliver 2'; Alves (yellow card) 28'	Report	Jones (yellow card) 76'; Fordyce 83'; Laing 88'; Ameobi 90'	Stadium: TD Place Stadium; Attendance: 2,402; Referee: Geoff Gamble

29 April 2015 Preliminary Round	Edmonton	3 – 1 (6 – 2 agg.)	Ottawa Fury	Edmonton, Alberta
22:00 EST UTC−5	Ameobi 8'; Nyassi 14'; Watson (yellow card) 59'; Fordyce 81' (pen.)	Report	Wiedeman 33'; Beckie (yellow card) 66'	Stadium: Clarke Stadium; Attendance: 1,858; Referee: Fischer Drew

== Squad statistics ==
As of match played 15 November 2015

=== Appearances and goals ===
No.	Pos	Nat	Player	Total		NASL		Soccer Bowl		Canadian Championship	
No.	Pos	Nat	Player	Apps	Goals	Apps	Goals	Apps	Goals	Apps	Goals
1	GK	(France) FRA	Romuald Peiser	33	0	29	0	2	0	2	0
2	DF	(United States) USA	Ryan Richter	34	0	30	0	2	0	2	0
3	DF	(Canada) CAN	Mason Trafford	28	1	25	1	2	0	1	0
4	DF	(Canada) CAN	Drew Beckie	16	0	15	0	0	0	1	0
5	MF	(Canada) CAN	Jérémy Gagnon-Laparé	3	0	2	0	1	0	0	0
6	MF	(Ireland) EIR	Richie Ryan	20	3	18	3	2	0	0	0
7	FW	(Brazil) BRA	Paulo Jr.	31	4	27	4	2	0	2	0
8	MF	(Scotland) SCO	Nicki Paterson	11	2	9	2	0	0	2	0
9	FW	(United States) USA	Tom Heinemann	31	12	27	8	2	4	2	0
10	MF	(Bosnia and Herzegovina) BIH	Siniša Ubiparipović	28	5	24	5	2	0	2	0
11	FW	(Brazil) BRA	Oliver	25	3	22	2	2	0	1	1
14	FW	(United States) USA	Aly Hassan	12	3	12	3	0	0	0	0
17	FW	(Canada) CAN	Carl Haworth	28	2	25	2	1	0	2	0
18	MF	(Costa Rica) CRC	Brandon Poltronieri	17	1	15	1	0	0	2	0
20	MF	(Canada) CAN	Mauro Eustáquio	23	2	20	2	2	0	1	0
23	FW	(United States) USA	Andrew Wiedeman	29	5	25	4	2	0	2	1
24	GK	(Canada) CAN	Marcel DeBellis	1	0	1	0	0	0	0	0
25	MF	(Canada) CAN	Julian de Guzman	17	0	15	0	1	0	1	0
32	DF	(Republic of Ireland) IRL	Colin Falvey	34	0	30	0	2	0	2	0
33	DF	(Brazil) BRA	Rafael Alves	33	4	30	4	2	0	1	0
77	FW	(Turkey) TUR	Uğur Albayrak	6	0	5	0	1	0	0	0
Players who appeared for Ottawa but left during the season:
15	MF	(Canada) CAN	Philippe Davies	5	0	5	0	0	0	0	0
27	MF	(Canada) CAN	Patryk Misik	7	0	5	0	0	0	2	0
29	DF	(United States) USA	Mike Randolph	3	0	3	0	0	0	0	0

=== Goal scorers ===
Rnk	Pos	No.	Nat	Name	NASL	Soccer Bowl	Canadian Championship	Total
1	FW	9	(United States)	Tom Heinemann	8	4	0	12
2	MF	10	(Bosnia and Herzegovina)	Siniša Ubiparipović	5	0	0	5
2	FW	23	(United States)	Andrew Wiedeman	4	0	1	5
4	FW	7	(Brazil)	Paulo Jr.	4	0	0	4
4	DF	33	(Brazil)	Rafael Alves	4	0	0	4
6	MF	6	(Republic of Ireland)	Richie Ryan	3	0	0	3
6	FW	14	(United States)	Aly Hassan	3	0	0	3
6	FW	11	(Brazil)	Oliver	2	0	1	3
9	MF	8	(Scotland)	Nicki Paterson	2	0	0	2
9	FW	17	(Canada)	Carl Haworth	2	0	0	2
9	MF	20	(Canada)	Mauro Eustáquio	2	0	0	2
12	DF	3	(Canada)	Mason Trafford	1	0	0	1
12	MF	18	(Costa Rica)	Brandon Poltronieri	1	0	0	1
Own goal					1	0	0	1
Total					42	4	2	48

=== Disciplinary ===
Number	Nation	Position	Name	NASL		Soccer Bowl		Canadian Championship		Total	
Number	Nation	Position	Name	Yellow card	Red card	Yellow card	Red card	Yellow card	Red card	Yellow card	Red card
1	(France)	GK	Romuald Peiser	5	0	0	0	0	0	5	0
2	(United States)	DF	Ryan Richter	4	0	0	0	0	0	4	0
3	(Canada)	DF	Mason Trafford	3	0	1	1	0	0	4	1
4	(Canada)	DF	Drew Beckie	5	0	0	0	1	0	6	0
6	(Republic of Ireland)	MF	Richie Ryan	3	0	1	0	0	0	4	0
7	(Brazil)	FW	Paulo Jr.	1	0	0	0	0	0	1	0
9	(United States)	FW	Tom Heinemann	0	0	1	0	0	0	1	0
10	(Bosnia and Herzegovina)	MF	Siniša Ubiparipović	3	0	0	0	0	0	3	0
11	(Brazil)	FW	Oliver	2	0	0	0	0	0	2	0
14	(United States)	FW	Aly Hassan	1	0	0	0	0	0	1	0
17	(Canada)	FW	Carl Haworth	2	0	0	0	0	0	2	0
18	(Costa Rica)	MF	Brandon Poltronieri	2	0	0	0	0	0	2	0
20	(Canada)	MF	Mauro Eustáquio	5	0	0	0	0	0	5	0
23	(United States)	FW	Andrew Wiedeman	2	0	0	0	0	0	2	0
25	(Canada)	MF	Julian de Guzman	0	1	0	0	0	0	0	1
32	(Republic of Ireland)	DF	Colin Falvey	2	0	1	0	0	0	3	0
33	(Brazil)	DF	Rafael Alves	4	0	0	0	1	0	5	0
			TOTALS	44	1	4	1	2	0	50	2

== Awards ==
=== Player ===
No.	Player	Award	Month	Source
8	(Scotland) Nicki Paterson	NASL Play of the Week (Week 8)	May	
1	(France) Romuald Peiser	NASL Player of the Month	June	
17	(Canada) Carl Haworth	NASL Player of the Week (Week 15)	July	
33	(Brazil) Rafael Alves	NASL Player of the Week (Week 16)	August	
10	(Bosnia and Herzegovina) Siniša Ubiparipović	NASL Player of the Week (Week 23)	September	
9	(United States) Tom Heinemann	NASL Player of the Week (Week 24)	September	
1	(France) Romuald Peiser	NASL Player of the Month	September	
1	(France) Romuald Peiser	NASL Golden Glove	November	
4	(Canada) Drew Beckie	NASL Humanitarian of the Year	November	
1	(France) Romuald Peiser	NASL Best XI	November	
33	(Brazil) Rafael Alves	NASL Best XI	November	
6	(Republic of Ireland) Richie Ryan	NASL Best XI	November	
4	(Canada) Drew Beckie	Ottawa Fury Community Award	November	
9	(United States) Tom Heinemann	Ottawa Fury Top Scorer Award	November	
3	(Canada) Mason Trafford	Ottawa Fury Supporters' Player of the Year	November	
–	(Republic of Ireland) (Brazil) Falvey/Alves (Note: The Fury's central defensive pair of Colin Falvey and Rafael Alves, known among supporters and staff as "Falves", were jointly given the club's Newcomer of the Year award.)	Ottawa Fury Newcomer of the Year Award	November	
1	(France) Romuald Peiser	Ottawa Fury Player of the Year	November	

=== Club/Staff ===
Recipient	Award	Month	Source
Club	NASL Fair Play Award	November	
(Canada) Marc Dos Santos	NASL Coach of the Year	November	
