= List of Love Is Blind: UK episodes =

The following is a list of episodes from Love Is Blind: UK, a British dating reality television programme produced by CPL Productions that first aired on Netflix in August 2024.

== Series overview ==
Season	Episodes	Originally released	
Season	Episodes	First released	Last released
1	12	August 7, 2024	August 26, 2024
2	14	August 13, 2025	August 31, 2025
3	11	August 19, 2026	August 30, 2026

== Episodes ==
=== Season 1 (2024) ===
Love Is Blind: UK series 1 episodes
No. overall	No. in season	Title	Original release date
Week 1
1	1	"The Pods Are Open"	7 August 2024
2	2	"Two’s A Couple, Three’s A Love Triangle"	7 August 2024
3	3	"He’s Here for Fame"	7 August 2024
4	4	"We Had Sex… Twice!"	7 August 2024
Week 2
5	5	"I Made a Mistake"	14 August 2024
6	6	"Once a Cheat, Always a Cheat"	14 August 2024
7	7	"Is She Good Enough for You?"	14 August 2024
8	8	"Guess Who's Back"	14 August 2024
9	9	"He Wants a Prenup"	14 August 2024
Week 3: The Altar
10	10	"See You at the Altar"	21 August 2024
11	11	"We're Not Ready"	21 August 2024
Special
12	12	"The Reunion"	26 August 2024

=== Season 2 (2025) ===
Love Is Blind: UK series 2 episodes
No. overall	No. in season	Title	Original release date
Week 1
13	1	"Eat, Sleep, Date, Repeat"	13 August 2025
14	2	"This Is How Triangles Ares Formed"	13 August 2025
15	3	"Trust My Spleen"	13 August 2025
16	4	"She Changed Her Mind Overnight"	13 August 2025
Week 2
17	5	"I Don't Want To Be a Villain"	20 August 2025
18	6	"Good Guys Finish Last"	20 August 2025
19	7	"You're Trying to Get Me in Trouble"	20 August 2025
20	8	"Walking Away"	20 August 2025
Week 3
21	9	"Don't Let Anyone Dim Your Sparkle"	27 August 2025
22	10	"A Risk Worth Taking?"	27 August 2025
Special
23	11	"The Reunion"	31 August 2025
After The Altar
24	12	"You're Still Married!"	12 July 2026
25	13	"I'm Here To Cause Some Chaos"	12 July 2026
26	14	"Falling In Love With You More and More"	12 July 2026

=== Season 3 (2026) ===
Love Is Blind: UK series 2 episodes
No. overall	No. in season	Title	Original release date
Week 1
27	1	"Gotta Stop Telling These Girls I Love Them!"	19 August 2026
28	2	"You Can't Even Remember Her Name!"	19 August 2026
29	3	"Is This Too Good to be True?"	19 August 2026
30	4	"Wow, Wow, Wow, Wow, Wow!"	19 August 2026
31	5	"I'm Anything But Boring"	19 August 2026
32	6	"If You Need To Walk Away, Walk Away"	19 August 2026
33	7	"No-one Is Butthurt"	19 August 2026
34	8	"I Look Like a Clown"	19 August 2026
