= Football at the 2013 Jeux de la Francophonie =

Tournament details
- Host country: France
- City: Nice
- Dates: 6–15 September
- Teams: 14 (from 4 confederations)

Final positions
- Champions: Congo (2nd title)
- Runners-up: Morocco
- Third place: Senegal
- Fourth place: Ivory Coast

Tournament statistics
- Matches played: 22
- Goals scored: 56 (2.55 per match)
- Top scorer: (Ivory Coast) Roger Claver Assale (6 goals)
- All statistics correct as of 15 September 2013.

The football competition at the 2013 Francophone Games is a tournament open to under 20 age group national teams.

== Participants ==
- Burkina Faso
- Ivory Coast
- Cameroon
- Canada
- Cape Verde (invitee) – withdrew
- Chad – withdrew
- Congo
- DR Congo
- France
- Gabon
- Haiti
- Lebanon (invitee)
- Morocco
- Niger
- Rwanda
- Senegal

== Matches ==
=== Group stage ===
==== Group A ====
| Team | Pld | W | D | L | GF | GA | GD | Pts |
|---|---|---|---|---|---|---|---|---|
| Ivory Coast | 2 | 2 | 0 | 0 | 6 | 1 | +5 | 6 |
| DR Congo | 2 | 1 | 0 | 1 | 6 | 3 | +3 | 3 |
| Niger | 2 | 0 | 0 | 2 | 1 | 9 | −8 | 0 |

7 September 2013
13:00

| DR Congo | 5–1 | Niger |
|---|---|---|
| Manzia 4', 18'; Oumarou 21' (o.g.); Mubele 33'; Walongwa 89' | | Diori Moumouni 43' |

9 September 2013
15:00

| Ivory Coast | 2–1 | DR Congo |
|---|---|---|
| Kouassi 75'; Assale 82' | | Pembele Mukanisa 78' |

11 September 2013
15:00

| Niger | 0–4 | Ivory Coast |
|---|---|---|
| | | Assale 21', 31', 85', 87' |

==== Group B ====
| Team | Pld | W | D | L | GF | GA | GD | Pts |
|---|---|---|---|---|---|---|---|---|
| Senegal | 3 | 2 | 1 | 0 | 8 | 1 | +7 | 7 |
| Gabon | 3 | 2 | 1 | 0 | 8 | 2 | +6 | 7 |
| Haiti | 3 | 1 | 0 | 2 | 2 | 6 | −4 | 3 |
| Lebanon | 3 | 0 | 0 | 3 | 1 | 10 | −9 | 0 |

7 September 2013
15:30

| Gabon | 1–1 | Senegal |
|---|---|---|
| Aboue Angue 5' | | Mendy 80' |

7 September 2013
15:30

| Haiti | 2–0 | Lebanon |
|---|---|---|
| Chery 37'; Pompe 45' |

9 September 2013
18:00

| Senegal | 4–0 | Lebanon |
|---|---|---|
| N'Diaye 32', 81'; N'Doye 44'; Mbodji 45+1' |

9 September 2013
18:00

| Gabon | 3–0 | Haiti |
|---|---|---|
| Ondo Biyoghe 32'; Aboue Angue 35'; Nzong Betoughe 76' |

11 September 2013
18:00

| Lebanon | 1–4 | Gabon |
|---|---|---|
| Al Dine 82' | | Nani Nono 26'; Mvele Ebale 50'; Ness Younga 54'; Ondo Biyoghe 61' |

11 September 2013
18:00

| Senegal | 3–0 | Haiti |
|---|---|---|
| Drame 32'; N'Doye 37'; N'Diaye 82' |

==== Group C ====
| Team | Pld | W | D | L | GF | GA | GD | Pts |
|---|---|---|---|---|---|---|---|---|
| Morocco | 2 | 1 | 0 | 1 | 2 | 1 | +1 | 3 |
| Cameroon | 2 | 1 | 0 | 1 | 1 | 1 | 0 | 3 |
| Burkina Faso | 2 | 1 | 0 | 1 | 1 | 2 | −1 | 3 |

6 September 2013
15:00

| Cameroon | 1–0 | Morocco |
|---|---|---|
| Eloundou Etoundi 48' |

8 September 2013
18:00

| Cameroon | 0–1 | Burkina Faso |
|---|---|---|
| | | Sido 35' |

10 September 2013
15:00

| Morocco | 2–0 | Burkina Faso |
|---|---|---|
| El Hassouni 42'; El Ouadi 85' |

==== Group D ====
| Team | Pld | W | D | L | GF | GA | GD | Pts |
|---|---|---|---|---|---|---|---|---|
| Congo | 3 | 2 | 1 | 0 | 7 | 2 | +5 | 7 |
| France | 3 | 1 | 1 | 1 | 4 | 4 | 0 | 4 |
| Canada | 3 | 1 | 0 | 2 | 3 | 7 | −4 | 3 |
| Rwanda | 3 | 0 | 2 | 1 | 1 | 2 | −1 | 2 |

6 September 2013
18:00

| France | 4–1 | Canada |
|---|---|---|
| Nangis 70'; Dutournier 75', 87'; Krzeminski 89' (o.g.) | | Misik 55' |

8 September 2013
18:00

| Rwanda | 0–1 | Canada |
|---|---|---|
| | | Osorio 40' |

8 September 2013
15:00

| Congo | 3–0 | France |
|---|---|---|
| Obassi Ngatsongo 15'; Bidimbou 28'; Biassadila Mouanga 58' |

10 September 2013
18:00

| France | 0–0 | Rwanda |

10 September 2013
18:00

| Canada | 1–3 | Congo |
|---|---|---|
| Misik 26' | | Biassadila Mouanga 6'; Obassi Ngatsongo 62'; Eustaquio 71' (o.g.) |

11 September 2013
15:00

| Congo | 1–1 | Rwanda |
|---|---|---|
| Biassadila Mouanga 67' | | Kabanda 54' |

=== Knockout stage ===
==== Semifinals ====
13 September 2013
17:00

| Ivory Coast | 1–1 | Morocco |
|---|---|---|
| Assale 36' | | Ati Allah 29' |
Penalties
| | 8–9 |

13 September 2013
20:00

| Senegal | 0–0 | Congo |
Penalties
| | 2–3 |

==== Third place playoff ====
15 September 2013
14:00

| Senegal | 0–0 | Ivory Coast |
Penalties
| | 11–10 |

==== Final ====
15 September 2013
16:30

| Morocco | 1–2 | Congo |
|---|---|---|
| Ati Allah 31' | | Obassi Ngatsongo 76', 83' |

== Squads ==
=== Burkina Faso ===
| No. | Pos. | Player | Date of birth (age) | Club |
|---|---|---|---|---|
| 1 | | Lassané Nikiéma | 16 December 1993 (aged 19) | |
| 2 | | Alpha Kaba | 16 September 1994 (aged 18) | |
| 3 | | Y. Alassane Sango | 7 January 1993 (aged 20) | |
| 4 | | A. Aziz Kaboré | 28 January 1994 (aged 19) | |
| 5 | | C. Oumar Bangré | 2 November 1993 (aged 19) | |
| 6 | | B.C.A. Rachid Coulibaly | 28 February 1993 (aged 20) | |
| 7 | | Faïçal Ouédraogo | 31 December 1995 (aged 17) | |
| 8 | | S. Abdel Sanou | 10 May 1994 (aged 19) | |
| 9 | | Fatao Bande' | 9 February 1993 (aged 20) | |
| 10 | | Fadil Sido | 13 April 1993 (aged 20) | |
| 11 | | R. Eric Traoré | 12 December 1994 (aged 18) | |
| 12 | | Romaric Pitroipa | 31 December 1994 (aged 18) | |
| 14 | | Halipha Sedego | 22 August 1993 (aged 20) | |
| 15 | | Ousmane Yabre Derra | 13 May 1993 (aged 20) | |
| 16 | | Séni D.J. Ouédraogo | 8 June 1995 (aged 18) | |
| 17 | | Arba D. Dicko | 7 January 1994 (aged 19) | |
| 18 | | Abraham Koné | 14 April 1994 (aged 19) | |
| 19 | | Zaniou Sana | 31 December 1994 (aged 18) | |
| 20 | | Ibrahim Ili | 10 November 1994 (aged 18) | |

=== Canada ===
| No. | Pos. | Player | Date of birth (age) | Club |
|---|---|---|---|---|
| 1 | | Maxime Crépeau | 11 May 1994 (aged 19) | (Canadian Soccer Association) Montreal Impact |
| 2 | | Jonathan Dollery | 7 September 1993 (aged 19) | (Norwegian Football Federation) Flekkerøy |
| 3 | | Allan Zébié | 29 May 1993 (aged 20) | (Canadian Soccer Association) FC Edmonton |
| 4 | | Dominique Morin | 3 January 1993 (aged 20) | (Canadian Soccer Association) Montreal Impact Academy |
| 5 | | Daniel Stanese | 21 January 1994 (aged 19) | (German Football Association) FC Augsburg II |
| 6 | | Mauro Eustaquio | 10 February 1993 (aged 20) | (Canadian Soccer Association) Ottawa Fury |
| 7 | | Alessandro Riggi | 30 November 1993 (aged 19) | (Canadian Soccer Association) Montreal Impact |
| 8 | | Bryce Alderson | 5 February 1994 (aged 19) | (German Football Association) Fortuna Düsseldorf II |
| 9 | | Caleb Clarke | 23 June 1993 (aged 20) | (Canadian Soccer Association) Vancouver Whitecaps FC |
| 10 | | Zakaria Messoudi | 30 October 1993 (aged 19) | (Canadian Soccer Association) FC Montreal |
| 11 | | Ben Fisk | 2 April 1993 (aged 20) | (Royal Spanish Football Federation) Deportivo II |
| 12 | | Patrick Majcher | 8 September 1993 (aged 19) | |
| 13 | | Anthony Osorio | 13 April 1994 (aged 19) | (Canadian Soccer Association) Toronto FC II |
| 14 | | Patryk Misik | 13 November 1994 (aged 18) | (Canadian Soccer Association) Ottawa Fury |
| 15 | | Yassin Essa | 2 August 1994 (aged 19) | |
| 16 | | Stefan Vukovic | 18 March 1993 (aged 20) | (Canadian Soccer Association) Toronto FC II |
| 17 | | Michael Krzeminski | 10 May 1993 (aged 20) | |
| 18 | | Ricky Gomes | 19 July 1993 (aged 20) | (Royal Spanish Football Federation) Deportivo II |
| 19 | | Tyler Pasher | 27 April 1994 (aged 19) | (United States Soccer Federation) Pittsburgh Riverhounds |
| 20 | | Jerome Smith | 16 September 1994 (aged 18) | |

=== Republic of the Congo ===
| No. | Pos. | Player | Date of birth (age) | Club |
|---|---|---|---|---|
| 1 | GK | James Ekoko | | |
| 2 | DF | Didier Cissé Bassoumba | | |
| 3 | DF | Chylpérick Pandza Mobie | | |
| 4 | MF | Charlin Dhesmand Bouetoutelamio | | |
| 5 | DF | Garcia Frisca Nkouka | | |
| 6 | DF | Andi Christian Tsiba Ngampika | | |
| 7 | MF | Junior A. Loussoukou Ngouala | | |
| 9 | FW | Bersyl Obassi Ngatsongo | | |
| 10 | MF | Justalain Moïse Kounkou | | |
| 11 | DF | Romaric Presley Etou-Thomaso | | |
| 12 | FW | Kader Georges Bidimbou | | |
| 13 | MF | Gloire Dorian Fivaz Mayanith | | |
| 14 | FW | Arci St Thibaut Biassadila Mouanga | | |
| 16 | GK | Pavelh Ndzila | | |
| 18 | FW | Percy Akoli | | |

=== Ivory Coast ===
| No. | Pos. | Player | Date of birth (age) | Club |
|---|---|---|---|---|
| 1 | | Cheick Mohamed Kone | 3 October 1993 (aged 19) | |
| 2 | | Jacob Ezechiel Depode | 25 December 1993 (aged 19) | |
| 3 | | Serge Wilfried Kanon | 6 July 1993 (aged 20) | |
| 4 | | Eric Bailly | 12 April 1994 (aged 19) | |
| 5 | | Konan Henri Joel Kouadio | 20 October 1993 (aged 19) | |
| 6 | | Davis Donald Kodia | 21 November 1993 (aged 19) | |
| 7 | | Jean Evrard Kouassi | 25 September 1994 (aged 18) | |
| 8 | | Bekanty Victorien Angban | 29 September 1996 (aged 16) | |
| 9 | | Kouame Kouadio | 13 January 1997 (aged 16) | |
| 10 | | Chomana Coulibaly | 1 March 1994 (aged 19) | |
| 11 | | Roger Claver Assale | 13 November 1993 (aged 19) | |
| 12 | | Mounet Pascal Seka | 12 February 1994 (aged 19) | |
| 13 | | Yao Serge N'Guessan | 31 July 1994 (aged 19) | |
| 14 | | Francky Desire Djedje | | |
| 15 | | Drissa Diarrassouba | 15 November 1994 (aged 18) | |
| 16 | | Adama Ouattara | 28 March 1995 (aged 18) | |
| 17 | | Christian Alex Angbandji | 12 November 1993 (aged 19) | |
| 18 | | Abdoul Aziz Siahoune | 10 April 1994 (aged 19) | |
| 19 | | Koffi Constant Kouame | 28 September 1995 (aged 17) | |
| 20 | | Ousmane Adama Ouattara | 22 December 1993 (aged 19) | |

=== Cameroon ===
| No. | Pos. | Player | Date of birth (age) | Club |
|---|---|---|---|---|
| 1 | | Kerrido Haschou | 2 June 1994 (aged 19) | |
| 2 | | Serge Alain Ane | 10 September 1994 (aged 18) | |
| 3 | | Charles Bertrand Eloundou Etoundi | 4 December 1994 (aged 18) | |
| 4 | | Charlie Took Essome | 25 May 1993 (aged 20) | |
| 5 | | Patrick Ngoula | 1 January 1993 (aged 20) | |
| 6 | | Franck Kouamejo Nankep | 20 October 1993 (aged 19) | |
| 7 | | Joseph Bah Yanki | 27 November 1993 (aged 19) | |
| 8 | | Marcel Kepdep Wamba | 5 September 1993 (aged 20) | |
| 9 | | Joseph Yanick Mbone | 16 April 1993 (aged 20) | |
| 10 | | Patrick Anaba Metogo | 20 May 1994 (aged 19) | |
| 11 | | Landry Nguene | 30 December 1993 (aged 19) | |
| 12 | | Rostand Moukap | 18 May 1993 (aged 20) | |
| 13 | | Jacques Ghislain Onana Ndzomo | 23 August 1993 (aged 20) | |
| 14 | | Etienne Wala Zock | 23 March 1994 (aged 19) | |
| 15 | | Robert Ndip Tambe | 22 February 1994 (aged 19) | |
| 16 | | Alassa Mounchili Nfombam | 17 April 1993 (aged 20) | |
| 17 | | Alain Roland Nandjou Ngalle | 2 September 1994 (aged 19) | |
| 18 | | Hugues Douglas Djika | 8 March 1993 (aged 20) | |
| 19 | | Fred Nyamat Nkot | 30 January 1994 (aged 19) | |
| 20 | | Ousseini Nji Mfifen Mounpain | 20 January 1994 (aged 19) | |

=== Democratic Republic of the Congo ===
| No. | Pos. | Player | Date of birth (age) | Club |
|---|---|---|---|---|
| 1 | | Lohrim Diafuka | 4 March 1993 (aged 20) | (French Football Federation) OC Vannes B |
| 2 | | Vivien Mayele Luzitu | 2 July 1995 (aged 18) | |
| 4 | | Anthony Walongwa | 15 October 1993 (aged 19) | (French Football Federation) FC Nantes II |
| 5 | | Christian Luyindama | 8 January 1994 (aged 19) | (Congolese Association Football Federation) DCMP |
| 6 | | Riguene Pembele Mukanisa | 3 February 1994 (aged 19) | |
| 7 | | Budge Manzia | 24 September 1994 (aged 18) | (Congolese Association Football Federation) Sharks XI FC |
| 8 | | Bukasa Bukasa Bakangila | 24 December 1994 (aged 18) | |
| 10 | | Héritier Luvumbu | 23 July 1994 (aged 19) | (Congolese Association Football Federation) SC Rojolu |
| 11 | | Firmin Mubele | 17 April 1994 (aged 19) | (Congolese Association Football Federation) AC Rangers |
| 12 | | Yannick Bangala | 12 April 1994 (aged 19) | (Congolese Association Football Federation) FC Les Stars |
| 14 | | Mabila Theo Ilunga | 21 January 1993 (aged 20) | (Congolese Association Football Federation) CS Don Bosco |
| 15 | | Eddy Ngoy Emomo | 13 October 1993 (aged 19) | (Tunisian Football Federation) US Monastir |
| 17 | | Mambu Menko Mambu | 28 November 1995 (aged 17) | |
| 18 | | Grâce Luemba Katshimuka | 12 February 1994 (aged 19) | (French Football Federation) FC Tours B |
| 19 | | Chikito Lema Mabidi | 11 June 1993 (aged 20) | (Congolese Association Football Federation) Sharks XI FC |
| 20 | | Thierry Kasereka | 26 April 1994 (aged 19) | (Congolese Association Football Federation) AS Vita Club |
| 23 | | Cédric Bakala Landu | 4 March 1993 (aged 20) | |

=== France ===
| No. | Pos. | Player | Date of birth (age) | Club |
|---|---|---|---|---|
| 1 | | Quentin Beunardeau | | |
| 2 | | Jordan Ikoko | | |
| 3 | | Raphaël Calvet | | |
| 4 | | Antoine Conte | | |
| 5 | | Lucas Rougeaux | | |
| 6 | | Anthony de Freitas | | |
| 7 | | Abdoulaye Toure | | |
| 8 | | Corentin Tolisso | | |
| 9 | | Romain Davigny | | |
| 10 | | Lenny Nangis | | |
| 11 | | Hadi Sacko | | |
| 12 | | Rhys Evagnignon | | |
| 13 | | Damien Dussaut | | |
| 14 | | Valentin Lavigne | | |
| 15 | | Pierre Bourdin | | |
| 16 | | Julien Fabri | | |
| 17 | | Julien Leghait | | |
| 18 | | Gaëtan Laborde | | |
| 19 | | Sylvio Ouassiero | | |
| 20 | | Charly Dutournier | | |

=== Gabon ===
| No. | Pos. | Player | Date of birth (age) | Club |
|---|---|---|---|---|
| 1 | | Ghislain Gnassa Chongo | | |
| 2 | | Yann Gnassa Mangonda | | |
| 3 | | Jeff Biloungou Nguebe | | |
| 4 | | Frank Engongah | | |
| 5 | | Hans Nguema Sambat | | |
| 6 | | Thecy Eboulou Yanga | | |
| 7 | | Léandre Degter Sombela Boundama | | |
| 8 | | Francis Ndjeme | | |
| 9 | | Yoann Nani Nono | | |
| 10 | | Knox Ness Younga | | |
| 11 | | Davy Mayoungou | | |
| 12 | | Giresse Koumba Koumba | | |
| 13 | | Mathieu Akame Ekang | | |
| 14 | | Cédric Ondo Biyoghe | | |
| 15 | | Maice Nguele | | |
| 16 | | Florent Ngouandzela | | |
| 17 | | Serge Kevyn Aboue Angue | | |
| 18 | | Regis Nzong Betoughe | | |
| 19 | | Rych Mvele Ebale | | |

=== Haiti ===
| No. | Pos. | Player | Date of birth (age) | Club |
|---|---|---|---|---|
| 1 | | Luis Valendi Odelus | | |
| 2 | | Samuel Mardochee Pompe | | |
| 3 | | Jean Isamel Voltaire | | |
| 4 | | Wilberne Augusmat | | |
| 5 | | Givemilord Ylozier | | |
| 6 | | Renald Metellus | | |
| 7 | | Jean Dany Maurice | | |
| 8 | | Stivens Jean Claude | | |
| 9 | | Johnley Chery | | |
| 10 | | Esso Faudelyn Amicy | | |
| 11 | | Dukens Nazon | | |
| 12 | | Ronald Elusma | | |
| 13 | | Paulson Pierre | | |
| 14 | | Luckner Junior Horat | | |
| 15 | | Alexandre Charles | | |
| 16 | | Alexander Nelien | | |
| 17 | | James Jean Francois | | |
| 18 | | Spencer Desir | | |
| 19 | | Shelove Compere | | |
| 20 | | Jude Saint Louis | | |

=== Lebanon ===
| No. | Pos. | Player | Date of birth (age) | Club |
|---|---|---|---|---|
| 1 | | Ali Sabeh | | |
| 2 | | Jared Sarwat Chouman | | |
| 3 | | Shadi Skaf | | |
| 4 | | Mohamad Askar | | |
| 5 | | Hussein Eldor | | |
| 7 | | Mohamad Maksoud | | |
| 8 | | Karim Taj Eddine | | |
| 9 | | Mahdi Fahs | | |
| 10 | | Moustafa Kanso | | |
| 11 | | Jaafar Issa | | |
| 13 | | Hassan El Haj | | |
| 15 | | Ail Ismail Ismail | | |
| 16 | | Bilal Najdi | | |
| 17 | | Ali Hamdar | | |
| 18 | | Ahmad Diab | | |
| 19 | | Mostafa Kamal Al Dine | | |
| 22 | | Danny El-Hage | | |
| 23 | | Hatem Eid | | |
| 25 | | Abdallah Aich | | |

=== Morocco ===
| No. | Pos. | Player | Date of birth (age) | Club |
|---|---|---|---|---|
| 1 | | Badreddine Benachour | 8 September 1994 (aged 18) | |
| 2 | | Mohamed Chibi | 21 January 1993 (aged 20) | |
| 3 | | Mohamed Saidi | 11 October 1994 (aged 18) | |
| 4 | | Anas El Asbahi | 15 October 1993 (aged 19) | |
| 5 | | Ayman El Hassouni | 22 February 1995 (aged 18) | |
| 6 | | Mohammed El Jaaouani | 23 August 1994 (aged 19) | |
| 8 | | El Mehdi Moufaddal | 27 March 1994 (aged 19) | |
| 10 | | Abdelkbir El Ouadi | 20 February 1993 (aged 20) | |
| 11 | | Youssef Essaiydy | 16 August 1994 (aged 19) | |
| 12 | | Mohamed Baayou | 11 January 1993 (aged 20) | |
| 13 | | Soufiane Bahja | 24 July 1993 (aged 20) | |
| 15 | | Reda Hajhouj | 2 July 1994 (aged 19) | |
| 16 | | Ayoub Qasmi | 19 September 1993 (aged 19) | |
| 17 | | Omar Ati Allah | 28 May 1993 (aged 20) | |
| 18 | | Walid El Karti | 23 July 1994 (aged 19) | |
| 20 | | Hamza Moussadak | 9 April 1994 (aged 19) | |
| 23 | | Adnane El Ouardy | 28 February 1994 (aged 19) | |

=== Niger ===
| No. | Pos. | Player | Date of birth (age) | Club |
|---|---|---|---|---|
| 1 | | Abass Mohamed | 7 October 1993 (aged 19) | |
| 2 | | Chaibou Issa | 1 July 1994 (aged 19) | |
| 3 | | Inoussa Ismael | 9 May 1994 (aged 19) | |
| 4 | | Mohamed Amadou Djibo W | 19 May 1994 (aged 19) | |
| 5 | | Hamidou Konate B | 30 June 1993 (aged 20) | |
| 6 | | Mohamed Nouraini Garba-Issaka | 31 December 1995 (aged 17) | |
| 7 | | Djibrila Diori Moumouni | 1 January 1993 (aged 20) | |
| 8 | | Youssouf Oumarou Alio | 16 February 1993 (aged 20) | |
| 9 | | Yacouba Ardali Abdou | 31 August 1994 (aged 19) | |
| 10 | | Moutari Amadou | 19 January 1994 (aged 19) | |
| 11 | | Ousmane Zeidine Ahmeye | 9 June 1994 (aged 19) | |
| 12 | | Hassane Amadou | 31 January 1993 (aged 20) | |
| 13 | | Massaoudou Nouhou | 2 May 1994 (aged 19) | |
| 14 | | Adamou Benjamin Ibrahim | 1 January 1994 (aged 19) | |
| 15 | | Boureima Abdoulaye Katkore | 26 March 1993 (aged 20) | |
| 16 | | Tunde Michel | 15 September 1995 (aged 17) | |
| 17 | | Haladou Mahamadou | 24 December 1993 (aged 19) | |
| 18 | | Dialiga Noaga Boubacar | 20 January 1994 (aged 19) | |
| 19 | | Dermane Fechal Sani | 14 January 1993 (aged 20) | |
| 20 | | Moctar Yacouba | 18 July 1994 (aged 19) | |

=== Rwanda ===
| No. | Pos. | Player | Date of birth (age) | Club |
|---|---|---|---|---|
| 1 | GK | Steven Ntalibi | 22 November 1994 (aged 18) | |
| 2 | DF | Michel Rusheshangoga | 25 August 1994 (aged 19) | |
| 3 | DF | Célestin Ndayishimiye | 11 October 1995 (aged 17) | |
| 4 | DF | Patrick Umwungeri | 12 July 1994 (aged 19) | |
| 5 | DF | Pacifique Shema | | |
| 6 | MF | Robert Ndatimana | 11 September 1995 (aged 17) | |
| 7 | MF | Hamidu Ndayisaba | 23 December 1994 (aged 18) | |
| 8 | DF | Emery Bayisenge | 2 November 1994 (aged 18) | |
| 9 | FW | Bonfils Kabanda | 18 September 1994 (aged 18) | |
| 10 | MF | Andrew Buteera | 3 October 1994 (aged 18) | |
| 11 | FW | Patrick Sibomana | 15 October 1995 (aged 17) | |
| 12 | FW | Justin Mico | 21 December 1994 (aged 18) | |
| 13 | DF | Héritier Turatsinze | 30 October 1994 (aged 18) | |
| 14 | FW | Janvier Benedata | 12 August 1995 (aged 18) | |
| 15 | FW | Barnabe Mubumbyi | 2 December 1994 (aged 18) | |
| 16 | DF | Jean Marie Rusingizandekwe | 1 July 1994 (aged 19) | |
| 17 | FW | Maxime Sekamana | 23 December 1995 (aged 17) | |
| 18 | GK | Olivier Kwizera | 30 July 1995 (aged 18) | |
| 19 | MF | Yanick Mukunzi | 2 October 1995 (aged 17) | |
| 20 | MF | Djihad Bizimama | | |
| | | Abdul Rwatubyaye | | |

=== Senegal ===
| No. | Pos. | Player | Date of birth (age) | Club |
|---|---|---|---|---|
| 1 | | Seydou Sy | | |
| 2 | | Ousseynou Thioune | | |
| 3 | | Ibrahima Mbaye | | |
| 5 | | Cheika Wade | | |
| 6 | | Sidy Sarr | | |
| 7 | | Pape Soma Diouf | | |
| 8 | | Dominique Mendy | | |
| 9 | | Badara Badji | | |
| 10 | | Serigne Fallou Niang | | |
| 11 | | Pape Babacar Ndoye | | |
| 12 | | Pape Diéne Faye | | |
| 13 | | Mamadou Mbodj | | |
| 14 | | Jacques Tendeng | | |
| 15 | | Ibrahima Drame | | |
| 16 | | Pape Seydou Ndiaye | | |
| 17 | | Roger Gomis | | |
| 18 | | Talla Ndiaye | | |
| 20 | | Amadou Doudou Soumare | | |
| 21 | | Mbaye Thilor Seck | | |
| 22 | | Moussa Wagué | | |
