= Bilal Najdi =

Lebanese footballer (born 1993)

Personal information
- Full name: Bilal Mahmoud Najdi
- Date of birth: 26 November 1993 (age 32)
- Place of birth: Tyre, Lebanon
- Position: Midfielder

Team information
- Current team: Rissala Toura
- Number: 2

Youth career
- Salam Sour

Senior career*
Years	Team	Apps	(Gls)
2012–2015	Tadamon Sour	30	(2)
2015–2016	Chabab Ghazieh	18	(0)
2016–	Ansar	34	(0)
2019–2020	→ Akhaa Ahli Aley (loan)	0	(0)
2022–2024	Nejmeh	18	(0)
2024–2025	Tadamon Sour	29	(1)
2026–	Rissala Toura	13	(0)

International career
2013	Lebanon U20		
2018	Lebanon	2	(0)
- * Club domestic league appearances and goals as of 22 July 2026

Bilal Mahmoud Najdi (Arabic: بلال محمود نجدي; born 26 November 1993) is a Lebanese footballer who plays as a midfielder for Lebanese Second Division club Rissala Toura.

== Club career ==
A youth product of Salam Sour, Najdi played for Tadamon Sour, before moving to Chabab Ghazieh in August 2015 on a one-season contract.

In August 2016, Najdi joined Ansar from Chabab Ghazieh. He moved to Akhaa Ahli Aley on a one-season loan in August 2019. Najdi signed for Nejmeh ahead of the 2022–23 Lebanese Premier League. After two years at Nejmeh, Najdi returned to Tadamon Sour in July 2024.

== International career ==
Najdi was called up to the Lebanon national under-20 team squad that participated in the 2013 Jeux de la Francophonie. He played for the senior team in two friendly games in 2018, against Oman and Kuwait.

== Honours ==
Ansar

- Lebanese Premier League: 2020–21
- Lebanese FA Cup: 2016–17, 2020–21
- Lebanese Super Cup: 2021

Nejmeh

- Lebanese Premier League: 2023–24
- Lebanese FA Cup: 2022–23
- Lebanese Super Cup: 2023
