= Abdallah Aich =

Lebanese footballer (born 1995)

- Aich with Lebanon in 2019

Personal information
- Full name: Abdallah Mohamad Fadel Aich
- Date of birth: 5 October 1995 (age 31)
- Place of birth: Tripoli, Lebanon
- Height: 1.73 m (5 ft 8 in)
- Position: Left-back

Team information
- Current team: Tripoli
- Number: 12

Youth career
- Mawadda Tripoli
- 2012–2015: Nejmeh

Senior career*
Years	Team	Apps	(Gls)
2012–2015	Nejmeh	1	(0)
2015–2016	Eintracht Nordhorn	25	(4)
2016–2017	Nejmeh	0	(0)
2016–2017	→ Ijtimaii (loan)	9	(1)
2017–2019	Tripoli	33	(0)
2019–2022	Nejmeh	24	(0)
2022–2024	Ansar	35	(0)
2024–2025	Bourj	5	(0)
2025–	Tripoli	9	(0)

International career^{‡}
2013	Lebanon U20		
2019–2021	Lebanon	2	(0)
- * Club domestic league appearances and goals as of 16:48, 11 March 2025 (UTC) ‡ National team caps and goals as of 16:01, 29 March 2021 (UTC)

Abdallah Mohamad Fadel Aich (Arabic: عبد الله محمد فاضل عيش, Lebanese Arabic pronunciation: [ʕabˈdɑlˤlˤɑ ʕajʃ]; born 5 October 1995) is a Lebanese footballer who plays as a left-back for Lebanese Premier League club Tripoli.

== Club career ==
Aich started his career at Mawadda Tripoli, before joining Nejmeh's youth team. He made his Lebanese Premier League debut on 6 May 2013, in a 2–1 loss against Safa. In 2015, Aich moved to Eintracht Nordhorn in Germany, where he made 25 appearances and scoring four goals.

He returned to Nejmeh in 2016 and was subsequently loaned to Ijtimaii for one season. After returning from his loan spell, he moved to Tripoli in 2017. In June 2019, while still a Tripoli player, Aich confirmed that he had held talks with Nejmeh and received interest from other domestic clubs, although he said that his main priority was joining a team that would help him develop as a player. He subsequently signed for Nejmeh in July 2019, returning to the club after two seasons with Tripoli. He made 33 appearances for Tripoli during his first spell at the club.

In July 2022, Aich joined cross-city rivals Ansar on a free transfer, after leaving Nejmeh. He later played for Bourj, before returning to Tripoli in 2025. On 19 August 2026, Tripoli announced that Aich had extended his contract with the club for another year.

== International career ==
Aich was called up by Lebanon U20 for the 2013 Jeux de la Francophonie, held in Nice, France.

He made his senior debut for Lebanon on 10 October 2019, playing the full 90 minutes in a 2–1 home win against Turkmenistan in the 2022 FIFA World Cup qualifiers. He made his second appearance for the national team on 29 March 2021, starting in a 1–1 friendly draw against Kuwait in Dubai.

== Career statistics ==
=== International ===
As of match played 29 March 2021

Appearances and goals by national team and year
National team	Year	Apps	Goals
Lebanon	2019	1	0
Lebanon	2020	0	0
Lebanon	2021	1	0
Total		2	0

== Honours ==
Nejmeh

- Lebanese FA Cup: 2021–22; runner-up: 2020–21
- Lebanese Elite Cup: 2021
- Lebanese Super Cup runner-up: 2021

Ansar

- Lebanese FA Cup: 2023–24
