= Jed Chouman =

Association football player (born 1993)

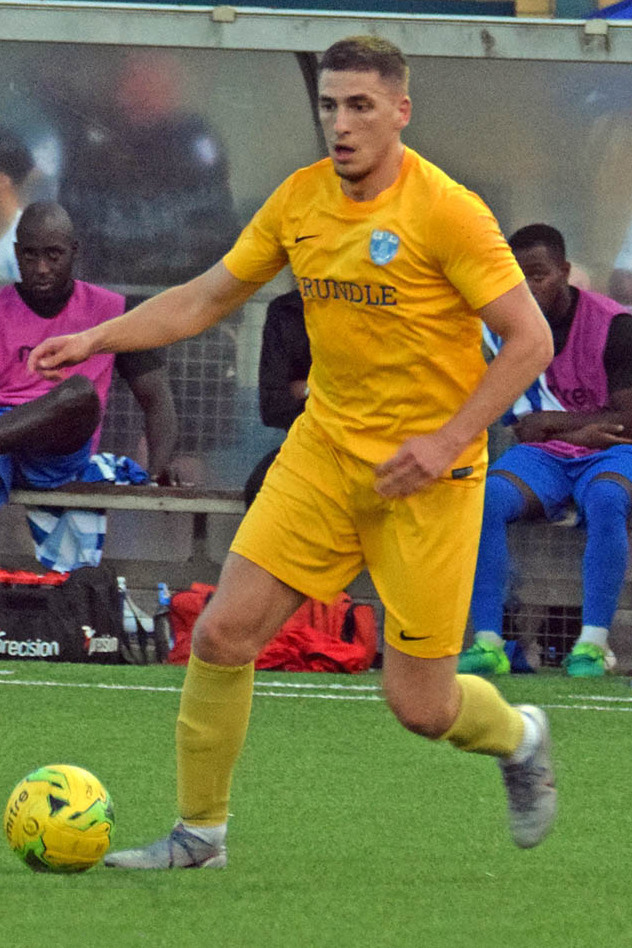
- Chouman with Barking in 2019

Personal information
- Full name: Jared Sarwat Yehia Chouman
- Date of birth: 19 March 1993 (age 33)
- Place of birth: Newham, England
- Positions: Defender; midfielder

Senior career*
Years	Team	Apps	(Gls)
2013–2015	Safa	18	(0)
2015–2019	Hornchurch	102	(2)
2019–2020	Barking	3	(0)
Total		123	(2)

International career
2013	Lebanon U20		
2012	Lebanon U22	2	(0)
2015	Lebanon U23	2	(0)
2014	Lebanon	3	(0)
- * Club domestic league appearances and goals

Jared Sarwat Yehia "Jed" Chouman (Arabic: جارد ثروت يحيى شومان; born 19 March 1993) is a former footballer who played as a defender or midfielder. Born in England, he played for the Lebanon national team.

== Club career ==
=== Safa ===
Chouman played in the Lebanese Premier League for Safa between 2013 and 2015. He first represented Safa at the 2013 AFC Cup, playing three games as a substitute in the group stage. In the 2013–14 season, he played eight league games, as well as one game in the 2014 AFC Cup as a starter, scoring a goal against Tajik club Ravshan Kulob on 23 April 2014 in an 8–0 win.

In the 2014–15 season, Chouman played 10 league games. He helped Safa win the Lebanese Super Cup in 2013, and finish second in the Lebanese Elite Cup in 2014.

=== England ===
Between 2015 and 2018, Chouman played for Hornchurch in the Isthmian League Division One North. He played 23 games in 2017–18, before being ruled out with injury for one year. On 16 July 2019, Chouman joined Isthmian League South Central Division side Barking, where he played four game in all competitions in 2019–20.

== International career ==
Chouman played for the Lebanon national under-20 team at the 2013 Jeux de la Francophonie. In 2015 he played for the under-23s in the 2016 AFC U-23 Championship qualification.

Chouman was first called up to the Lebanon national team in October 2014, as part of a mixed squad of senior and Olympic players for friendly matches against Qatar and Saudi Arabia. He played in three friendly games in 2014, against Qatar, Saudi Arabia, and the United Arab Emirates.

== Personal life ==
Born in Newham, England, Chouman is of Lebanese descent. As of 2025, he worked as a configuration manager in Essex, England. Chouman participated in season 2 of the British reality TV show Love Is Blind: UK.

== Honours ==
Safa

- Lebanese Super Cup: 2013
- Lebanese Elite Cup runner-up: 2014

Hornchurch

- Isthmian League North Division: 2017–18

== See also ==
- List of Lebanon international footballers born outside Lebanon
