= 2015 Fort Lauderdale Strikers season =

Fort Lauderdale Strikers
2015 season
- Owner: (Brazil) Paulo Cesso (Brazil) Rafael Bertani (Brazil) Ricardo Geromel (Brazil) Ronaldo
- Head coach: (Austria) Günter Kronsteiner
- Stadium: Lockhart Stadium; Fort Lauderdale, Florida
- NASL: Spring: Eighth Fall: Fourth Combined: Fourth
- Soccer Bowl: Semi-finalist
- U.S. Open Cup: Third round
- Top goalscorer: League: Stefano Pinho (5); All: Stefano Pinho (8)
- Highest home attendance: 11,691 (Club Record) (Apr. 4 vs. New York)
- Lowest home attendance: 3,283 (July 18 vs. Atlanta)
- Average home league attendance: League: 5,653; All: 5,800
Home colors	Away colors

The 2015 Fort Lauderdale Strikers season was the team's fifth season in the North American Soccer League (NASL).

== Players and staff ==
=== Roster ===
As of June 30, 2015

No.	Position	Nation	Player
3	DF	USA	Karsten Smith
5	MF	BRA	Marlon Freitas (on loan from Fluminense)
6	MF	BRA	PC
7	DF	USA	Frankie Sanfilippo
8	MF	GHA	Evans Frimpong
11	MF	ESP	Dani Sánchez
12	DF	HON	Iván Guerrero
14	DF	USA	Jordan Graye
16	DF	ITA	Josh Travagli
17	MF	USA	Shawn Chin
19	FW	COL	José Angulo
20	MF	USA	Christian Blandon
21	MF	HON	Walter Ramírez
22	GK	USA	Lionel Brown
23	MF	USA	Manny Gonzalez
24	GK	USA	David Meves
25	DF	USA	Daniel Navarro
27	DF	GER	Fabian Kling
29	FW	BRA	Stefano Pinho (on loan from Fluminense)
38	GK	USA	Joe Nasco
42	MF	HAI	James Marcelin
90	FW	BRA	Bruno Nunes

=== Staff ===
- (Brazil) Ricardo Geromel – Managing Partner
- (Brazil) Amaury Nunes – General Manager
- (Austria) Günter Kronsteiner – Head Coach
- (Germany) Raoul Voss – Assistant Coach
- (Honduras) Iván Guerrero – Player/Assistant Coach
- (Brazil) Gustavo Alencar – Assistant Coach

== Competitions ==
Win Tie Loss

=== Friendlies ===
February 18, 2015 Scrimmage	Fort Lauderdale Strikers (United States)	2–7	(Sweden) BK Häcken	Fort Lauderdale, Florida
				Stadium: Lockhart Stadium

February 28, 2015 Preseason	Jacksonville Armada FC	1–0	Fort Lauderdale Strikers	Jacksonville, Florida
7:30 p.m. EDT	Scaglia (yellow card) 16'; Nicklaw 44'	Report		Stadium: Community First Park; Attendance: 5,232

March 1, 2015 Preseason	Fort Lauderdale Strikers	2–0	Palm Beach Atlantic Sailfish	Fort Lauderdale, Florida
4:00 p.m. EDT	Gonzalez 7'; Marcelin 16'	Report		Stadium: Lockhart Stadium

March 6, 2015 Preseason	Fort Lauderdale Strikers	0–1	Floridians FC	Fort Lauderdale, Florida
3:30 p.m. EDT		Report	4'	Stadium: Lockhart Stadium
Note: 70 minute scrimmage. Trialist squad.

March 6, 2015 Preseason	Fort Lauderdale Strikers	3–0	FIU Panthers	Fort Lauderdale, Florida
5:30 p.m. EDT	Hassan 5', 25' (pen.); Sánchez 62'	Report	(yellow card) 20'; (red card) 85'	Stadium: Lockhart Stadium

March 14, 2015 Preseason	Fort Lauderdale Strikers	2–0	Florida Gulf Coast Eagles	Fort Lauderdale, Florida
1:00 p.m. EDT	Stefano 7'; Hassan 50'	Report		Stadium: Lockhart Stadium

March 21, 2015 Preseason	Fort Lauderdale Strikers	5–0	Jacksonville Armada FC	Fort Lauderdale, Florida
7:30 p.m. EDT	Stefano 17', 43'; Frimpong 46'; Ramírez 71'; Angulo 89'	Report		Stadium: Lockhart Stadium

March 28, 2015 Preseason	Fort Lauderdale Strikers	0–0	Floridians FC	Pembroke Pines, Florida
7:00 p.m. EDT		Report		Stadium: Broward College South Campus

April 12, 2015 Preseason	Fort Lauderdale Strikers	2–1	Miami United F.C.	Fort Lauderdale, Florida
a.m. EDT	Goal		Hurtado 88'	Stadium: Lockhart Stadium

June 20, 2015 Midseason Friendly	Ponte Preta (Brazil)	4–0	(United States) Fort Lauderdale Strikers	Campinas, Brazil
5:30 p.m. EDT	Cajá 23'; Leandrinho 58'; Vitor Xavier 63'; Adrianinho 87'			Stadium: Estádio Moisés Lucarelli

July 1, 2015 Challenge Cup	Fort Lauderdale Strikers (United States)	0–3	(Argentina) Boca Juniors	Fort Lauderdale, Florida
8:00 p.m. EDT	Sanfilippo (yellow card) 30'; Ramírez (yellow card) 45+2'; Stefano (yellow card) 60'	Report	Calleri 3'; Rolín (yellow card) 6', (goal) 55'; Pérez (yellow card) 62'; Pavón 77'	Stadium: Lockhart Stadium; Attendance: 6,827

August 2015 Midseason Friendly	Nova Southeastern Sharks	v	Fort Lauderdale Strikers	Fort Lauderdale, Florida
TBD p.m. EDT				Stadium: NSU Soccer Complex

=== NASL Spring season ===
==== Standings ====
Pos	Team	Pld	W	D	L	GF	GA	GD	Pts	Qualification
1	New York Cosmos (S)	10	5	5	0	18	9	+9	20	Playoffs
2	Tampa Bay Rowdies	10	5	4	1	15	9	+6	19	
3	Carolina RailHawks	10	3	5	2	15	10	+5	14	
4	Minnesota United	10	3	5	2	15	13	+2	14	
5	Indy Eleven	10	3	4	3	13	12	+1	13	
6	Jacksonville Armada	10	3	3	4	15	18	−3	12	
7	San Antonio Scorpions	10	3	3	4	11	15	−4	12	
8	Fort Lauderdale Strikers	10	3	2	5	12	13	−1	11	
9	Ottawa Fury	10	2	5	3	5	8	−3	11	
10	FC Edmonton	10	2	3	5	16	22	−6	9	
11	Atlanta Silverbacks	10	1	5	4	7	13	−6	8	

Source: NASL
Rules for classification: 1) points; 2) total goal differential; 3) total goals scored; 4) head-to-head record; 5) away goal differential; 6) away goals scored
(S) Spring season champion

==== Results summary ====
Overall								Home						Away					
Pld	W	D	L	GF	GA	GD	Pts	W	D	L	GF	GA	GD	W	D	L	GF	GA	GD
10	3	2	5	12	13	−1	11	1	1	3	3	5	−2	2	1	2	9	8	+1

Last updated: June 22, 2015.
Source: Match reports

==== Results by round ====
Round	1	2	3	4	5	6	7	8	9	10
Stadium	H	H	A	A	H	A	H	A	H	A
Result	L	W	L	W	D	L	L	D	L	W
Position	7	5	9	3	3	7	9	8	10	8

Updated to match(es) played on June 22, 2015. Source: Match reports
A = Away; H = Home; W = Win; D = Draw; L = Loss

==== Match reports ====
April 4, 2015 Match 1	Fort Lauderdale Strikers	0–1	New York Cosmos	Fort Lauderdale, Florida
7:30 p.m. EDT	PC (yellow card) 42'; Stefano (yellow card) 45'	Report	Ayoze (yellow card) 52'; Fernandes 58'	Stadium: Lockhart Stadium; Attendance: 11,691 (Club Record)

April 11, 2015 Match 2 Coastal Cup	Fort Lauderdale Strikers	2–1	Jacksonville Armada FC	Fort Lauderdale, Florida
7:30 p.m. EDT	Sanfilippo (yellow card) 7'; Moura 45' (pen.); Freitas (yellow card) 64'; PC 65'; Stefano (yellow card) 90' (red card) 90+1'	Report	Trejo (yellow card) 45+1' (yellow-red card) 90+1'; Hoyos 49'; Scaglia (yellow card) 90+3'	Stadium: Lockhart Stadium; Attendance: 4,883

April 19, 2015 Match 3	FC Edmonton	3–2	Fort Lauderdale Strikers	Edmonton, Alberta
4:00 p.m. EDT	Jones 7', (yellow card) 86'; Moses (yellow card) 42'; Nyassi 75'; Ameobi 80'; Laing (yellow card) 90'	Report	Sánchez 20'; Moura (yellow card) 49', (goal) 62'	Stadium: Clarke Stadium; Attendance: 2,351

April 25, 2015 Match 4	Ottawa Fury FC	1–3	Fort Lauderdale Strikers	Ottawa, Ontario
3:00 p.m. EDT	Alves 78'; Haworth (yellow card) 78'	Report	Angulo 41', 90'; Freitas 64'; PC (yellow card) 69'	Stadium: TD Place Stadium; Attendance: 3,023

May 2, 2015 Match 5	Fort Lauderdale Strikers	0–0	Atlanta Silverbacks	Fort Lauderdale, Florida
7:30 p.m. EDT		Report	Mensing (yellow card) 85'	Stadium: Lockhart Stadium; Attendance: 5,295

May 16, 2015 Match 6 Coastal Cup	Tampa Bay Rowdies	1–0	Fort Lauderdale Strikers	St. Petersburg, Florida
7:30 p.m. EDT	Hernández 55'	Report	Hassan (yellow card) 85'	Stadium: Al Lang Stadium; Attendance: 6,851

May 23, 2015 Match 7	Fort Lauderdale Strikers	0–1	Carolina RailHawks	Fort Lauderdale, Florida
7:30 p.m. EDT	PC (yellow card) 59'; Adeleye (yellow card) 67'	Report	Shipalane 44'; Anderson (yellow card) 54'; Fitzgerald (yellow card) 62'; Novo (yellow card) 70'	Stadium: Lockhart Stadium; Attendance: 4,801; Referee: Marcos de Oliveira

May 30, 2015 Match 8	San Antonio Scorpions	1–1	Fort Lauderdale Strikers	San Antonio, Texas
8:30 p.m. EDT	Nane 21'; DeRoux (yellow card) 62' (yellow-red card) 86'	NASL Report; FTL Report	Stefano 43'	Stadium: Toyota Field; Attendance: 6,396; Referee: Tyler J. Ploeger

June 6, 2015 Match 9	Fort Lauderdale Strikers	1–2	Indy Eleven	Fort Lauderdale, Florida
7:30 p.m. EDT	Stefano 23'; Sánchez (yellow card) 36'; Marcelin (yellow card) 46'; Moura (yellow card) 82'; Angulo (yellow card) 82'	NASL Report; FTL Report	Pineda 44', 90+4'	Stadium: Lockhart Stadium; Attendance: 5,803; Referee: Daniel Fitzgerald

June 13, 2015 Match 10	Minnesota United FC	2–3	Fort Lauderdale Strikers	Blaine, Minnesota
EDT	Ibarra 18' (pen.); Mendes (yellow card) 26'; Pitchkolan 38'	NASL Report; FTL Report	Stefano 3', 81', (yellow card) 67'; Angulo 79', (red card) 84'	Stadium: National Sports Center; Attendance: 9,342; Referee: Nima Saghafi

=== NASL Fall season ===
==== Standings ====
Pos	Team	Pld	W	D	L	GF	GA	GD	Pts	Qualification
1	Ottawa Fury (F)	20	13	6	1	37	15	+22	45	Playoffs
2	Minnesota United	20	11	6	3	39	26	+13	39	
3	New York Cosmos	20	10	6	4	31	21	+10	36	
4	Fort Lauderdale Strikers	20	8	6	6	37	27	+10	30	
5	FC Edmonton	20	7	5	8	25	24	+1	26	
6	Atlanta Silverbacks	20	6	7	7	24	27	−3	25	
7	Carolina RailHawks	20	6	3	11	29	39	−10	21	
8	Tampa Bay Rowdies	20	5	5	10	18	28	−10	20	
9	Indy Eleven	20	5	5	10	23	36	−13	20	
10	San Antonio Scorpions	20	4	7	9	30	37	−7	19	
11	Jacksonville Armada	20	5	4	11	18	31	−13	19	

Source: NASL
Rules for classification: 1) points; 2) total goal differential; 3) total goals scored; 4) head-to-head record; 5) away goal differential; 6) away goals scored
(F) Fall season champion

==== Results summary ====
Overall								Home						Away					
Pld	W	D	L	GF	GA	GD	Pts	W	D	L	GF	GA	GD	W	D	L	GF	GA	GD
20	8	6	6	37	27	+10	30	4	4	2	23	15	+8	4	2	4	14	12	+2

Last updated: October 31, 2015.
Source: Match reports

==== Results by round ====
Round	1	2	3	4	5	6	7	8	9	10	11	12	13	14	15	16	17	18	19	20
Stadium	A	H	H	A	A	A	H	H	A	H	A	H	H	H	A	A	H	H	A	A
Result	D	D	D	W	L	L	D	W	W	W	D	W	L	L	W	L	W	D	L	W
Position	5	9	8	6	8	8	7	6	6	5	4	4	5	5	4	4	4	4	4	4

Updated to match(es) played on November 1, 2015. Source: Match reports
A = Away; H = Home; W = Win; D = Draw; L = Loss

==== Match reports ====
July 8, 2015 Match 1	Carolina RailHawks	1–1	Fort Lauderdale Strikers	Cary, North Carolina
7:30 p.m. EDT	Hlavaty 53'	FTL Report; NASL Report	Stefano 77'	Stadium: WakeMed Soccer Park; Attendance: 3,055; Referee: Younes Marrakchi

July 11, 2015 Match 2	Fort Lauderdale Strikers	1–1	FC Edmonton	Fort Lauderdale, Florida
7:30 p.m. EDT	Ramírez (yellow card) 16', (goal) 68' (pen.)	FTL Report; NASL Report	Nonni (yellow card) 32'; Ford 86' (o.g.); Raudales (yellow card) 90+5'	Stadium: Lockhart Stadium; Attendance: 3,816; Referee: Daniel Fitzgerald

July 18, 2015 Match 3	Fort Lauderdale Strikers	2–2	Atlanta Silverbacks	Fort Lauderdale, Florida
7:30 p.m. EDT	PC (yellow card) 52'; Freitas 55', (yellow card) 55'; Ramírez 90' (pen.)	FTL Report; NASL Report	Chavez 64'; Ferreira-Mendes 76'	Stadium: Lockhart Stadium; Attendance: 3,283; Referee: Bernhard Hosu

July 25, 2015 Match 4 Coastal Cup	Tampa Bay Rowdies	1–3	Fort Lauderdale Strikers	St. Petersburg, Florida
7:30 p.m. EDT	Nuñez (yellow card) 50'; Maicon Santos 90+1'; Agbossoumonde (yellow card) 90+3'	Summary	PC 16'; Smith (yellow card) 25'; Marcelin (yellow card) 29'; Bruno Nunes 79'; Stefano Pinho 90+3'	Stadium: Al Lang Stadium; Attendance: 4,494; Referee: (United States) Matthew Kreitzer

August 2, 2015 Match 5	New York Cosmos	2–0	Fort Lauderdale Strikers	Hempstead, New York
5:00 p.m. EDT	Freeman 27', (yellow card) 39'; Fernandes 43'	Report	Kling (yellow card) 74'	Stadium: Shuart Stadium; Attendance: 4,503; Referee: Robert Sibiga

August 5, 2015 Match 6	Atlanta Silverbacks	2–1	Fort Lauderdale Strikers	Atlanta
7:30 p.m. EDT	Ferreira-Mendes 41', 66'; Hughes (yellow card) 85'	Report	Ramírez 49'; Pinho (red card) 84'; Marcelin (red card) 90'	Stadium: Atlanta Silverbacks Park; Attendance: 3,071; Referee: Baboucarr Jallow

August 8, 2015 Match 7	Fort Lauderdale Strikers	3–3	New York Cosmos	Fort Lauderdale, Florida
7:30 p.m. EDT	Gabriel 23'; Ramírez 48', 59', (yellow card) 59'	Report	Fernandes 62'; Moffat 66'; Raúl (yellow card) 87'; Guenzatti 90'; Gorskie (yellow card) 90'	Stadium: Lockhart Stadium; Attendance: 5,667; Referee: Marco De Oliveira

August 15, 2015 Match 8 Coastal Cup	Fort Lauderdale Strikers	2–1	Tampa Bay Rowdies	Fort Lauderdale, Florida
7:30 p.m. EDT	Stefano 4'; Gabriel (yellow card) 18'; Thomas (yellow card) 30'; Marcelin 43'	Report	Maicon Santos 19'; Mkandawire (yellow card) 41'; Saragoza (yellow card) 71'	Stadium: Lockhart Stadium; Attendance: 5,145; Referee: Alejandro Mariscal

August 23, 2015 Match 9	FC Edmonton	0–2	Fort Lauderdale Strikers	Edmonton, Alberta
4:00 p.m. EDT		Summary	Stefano Pinho 58' (pen.) 86'	Stadium: Clarke Stadium; Attendance: 3,110; Referee: (Canada) Pierre Lauziere

August 29, 2015 Match 10	Fort Lauderdale Strikers	7–1	Indy Eleven	Fort Lauderdale, Florida
7:30 p.m. EDT	Stéfano 2' 77' 81'; PC 7' 85'; Thomas (yellow card) 10'; Marlon Freitas 20' 67'	Summary	Richards 16'; Pineda (yellow card) 18'; Franco (red card) 50'	Stadium: Lockhart Stadium; Attendance: 3,819; Referee: (United States) Daniel Radford

September 12, 2015 Match 11	Ottawa Fury FC	0–0	Fort Lauderdale Strikers	Ottawa, Ontario
3:00 p.m. EDT	Eustáquio (yellow card) 83'	Summary	Chin (yellow card) 7'	Stadium: TD Place Stadium; Attendance: 6,327; Referee: (United States) Yusri Rudolf

September 16, 2015 Match 12; Coastal Cup	Fort Lauderdale Strikers	2–0	Jacksonville Armada FC	Fort Lauderdale, Florida
7:30 p.m. EDT	Marlon Freitas 17'; Sánchez (yellow card) 88'; Marcelin 90'	Summary	Nicklaw (yellow card) 28'; Rodríguez (yellow card) 39'; Ortiz (yellow card) 56'	Stadium: Lockhart Stadium; Attendance: 1,278; Referee: (United States) Daniel Radford

September 19, 2015 Match 13	Fort Lauderdale Strikers	0–2	Ottawa Fury FC	Fort Lauderdale, Florida
7:30 p.m. EDT	Gabriel (yellow card) 66'; PC (red card) 72'	Summary	Hassan 52'; Ubiparipović 81'	Stadium: Lockhart Stadium; Attendance: 3,773; Referee: (United States) Alex Chilowicz

September 26, 2015 Match 14	Fort Lauderdale Strikers	2–5	Minnesota United FC	Fort Lauderdale, Florida
7:30 p.m. EDT	Angulo 7' 88'; Chin (yellow card) 52'; Borrajo (yellow card) 70'	Summary	Ramirez 12'; Alhassan 27'; Daniel Mendes 44'; Ibson 61' 86'	Stadium: Lockhart Stadium; Attendance: 2,903; Referee: (Canada) Mathieu Bourdeau

October 3, 2015 Match 15	San Antonio Scorpions	2–4	Fort Lauderdale Strikers	San Antonio, Texas
8:30 p.m. EDT	Cann (yellow card) 50'; Tyrpak 56'; Hassli (yellow card) 63'; DeRoux 79'	Summary	Stéfano 10' 40' 86'; Marlon Freitas 15'; Borrajo (yellow card) 37'; Bruno Nunes (yellow card) 90'	Stadium: Toyota Field; Attendance: 7,832; Referee: (United States) Alejandro Mariscal

October 10, 2015 Match 16	Minnesota United FC	2–1	Fort Lauderdale Strikers	Blaine, Minnesota
7:00 p.m. EDT	Campos 6'; Daniel Mendes 27'; Tiago Calvano (yellow card) 63'; Davis (yellow card) 90'	Summary	PC 78'; Sanfilippo (yellow card) 85'	Stadium: National Sports Center; Attendance: 9,207; Referee: (Canada) David Gantar

October 17, 2015 Match 17	Fort Lauderdale Strikers	4–0	Carolina RailHawks	Fort Lauderdale, Florida
7:30 p.m. EDT	Sanfilippo 23'; Borrajo 30'; Marlon Freitas 48'; Stéfano 56'	Summary		Stadium: Lockhart Stadium; Attendance: 2,998; Referee: (United States) Younes Marrakchi

October 21, 2015 Match 18	Fort Lauderdale Strikers	0–0	San Antonio Scorpions	Fort Lauderdale, Florida
7:30 p.m. EDT		Summary	Chávez (yellow card) 78'	Stadium: Lockhart Stadium; Attendance: 2,632; Referee: (United States) Juan Marquez

October 24, 2015 Match 19	Indy Eleven	2–1	Fort Lauderdale Strikers	Indianapolis, Indiana
7:30 p.m. EDT	Smart 19' (yellow card) 29'; Steinberger (yellow card) 34'; Brown 43'; Nicht (yellow card) 90'	Summary	Angulo 59'; Thomas (yellow card) 90'	Stadium: Carroll Stadium; Attendance: 9,213; Referee: (Canada) Mathieu Bourdeau

November 1, 2015 Match 20; Coastal Cup	Jacksonville Armada FC	0–1	Fort Lauderdale Strikers	Jacksonville, Florida
4:00 p.m. EDT		Summary	Borrajo (yellow card) 67'; Marlon Freitas 87' (yellow card) 88'; Guerrero (yellow card) 90'	Stadium: Community First Park; Attendance: 9,083; Referee: (United States) Nima Saghafi

=== U.S. Open Cup ===
The Strikers will compete in the 2015 edition of the Open Cup.

May 27, 2015 Third Round	Charleston Battery (South Carolina)	3–2	(Florida) Fort Lauderdale Strikers	Charleston, South Carolina
EDT	Garbanzo 30', (yellow card) 42'; Kelly (yellow card) 55', (goal) 80'; Prince 77'	Report	Bruno 6'; Meves (yellow card) 23'; Gonzalez (yellow card) 33'; Sánchez 40', (yellow card) 90+'; Kling (yellow card) 68' (yellow-red card) 90+'	Stadium: Blackbaud Stadium; Attendance: 1,551
