= Love Is Blind: UK =

British dating reality TV show

- Genre: Reality
- Created by: Chris Coelen
- Presented by: Matt Willis; Emma Willis
- Starring: Love Is Blind: UK participants
- Country of origin: United Kingdom
- Original language: English
- No. of seasons: 3
- No. of episodes: 37 (list of episodes)

Production
- Executive producers: Nazleen Karim; Murray Boland; Dermot Caulfield; Danielle Lux; Nick Walker; Cat Spooner
- Running time: 41–72 minutes
- Production company: CPL Productions

Original release
- Network: Netflix
- Release: 7 August 2024 – present

Related
- Love Is Blind

Love is Blind: UK is a British reality television programme on Netflix produced by CPL Productions and hosted by Matt Willis and Emma Willis. It is a spin-off of the American show of the same name created by Chris Coelen. As a social experiment, it allows single men and women to blindly date, fall in love and get engaged. In 2025, Love is Blind: UK was nominated for a BAFTA for its first season.

It originally premiered on 7 August 2024, as a three-week event. On 21 August 2024, it was announced that Love is Blind: UK had been renewed for a second season.

== Format ==
The show follows an equal number of men and women seeking a romantic connection. Over the first 10 days, participants date one another in specially designed "pods" — private rooms divided by a blue-tinted translucent screen that allows them to communicate without seeing each other. The process begins with speed dating sessions, following which individuals can choose to spend longer periods with those they feel most compatible with. Marriage proposals can be made at any time, and once they are accepted, the couple is allowed to meet in person for the first time.

The engaged couples then travel to a resort for a week-long retreat, where they go on dates to deepen their relationship, have the chance to be physically intimate, and meet other couples participating in the experiment. Following the retreat, couples move into an apartment complex in London for the remaining three weeks. During this time, they meet family and friends, navigate finances, daily habits, leisure activities and living arrangements as they prepare for their weddings. At the altar, each participant can choose to say "I do" and legally marry their partner or split up forever, ultimately answering the question as to whether love is truly blind.

Season 1 also featured a reunion special shot approximately a year after filming and released soon after the final episode.

== Production ==
=== Filming locations ===
Both seasons were shot in different countries across Europe and presumably lasted 38 days up until the weddings. The ten days in the pods were shot in Strängnäs, Sweden, reusing the set from Love Is Blind: Sweden.

Filming for the first season then moved to the Angsana Corfu Resort & Spa in Corfu, Greece, where the engaged couples enjoyed a week-long retreat. The couples that made it through the retreat then moved in together to the serviced apartments at STAY in Camden, London, where they spent the rest of the time filming up until the weddings. The weddings took place at Wynyard Hall in Stockton-on-Tees in County Durham, England.

By comparison, the engaged couples from the second season stayed at the Cap St George Hotel and Resort in Peyia, Cyprus for their week-long post-pod retreat. They then moved to Ducie Street Warehouse in Manchester, where they lived together in the run-up to getting married. The weddings took place at Coos’ Cathedral in Aboyne Castle in Aberdeenshire, Scotland.

In both seasons, the bridal gowns used in the wedding episodes were supplied by the London boutique Evelie.

=== Initial release and subsequent orders ===
The first four episodes of the first season were released on August 7, 2024, the next five on August 14, and the final two on August 21. On August 26, Netflix released the reunion special. As of August 2025, the show has been renewed through Season 3.

=== Unaired engagements and breakups ===
There were reportedly four engagements in season 1 that were not featured on the show; however, Netflix has only officially acknowledged one of them. Conversely, Nicole Stevens and Sam Klein also ended their engagement off-camera.

== Episodes ==
| Season | Episodes | Originally released | |
| Season | Episodes | First released | Last released |
|---|---|---|---|
| 1 | 12 | August 7, 2024 | August 26, 2024 |
| 2 | 14 | August 13, 2025 | August 31, 2025 |
| 3 | 11 | August 19, 2026 | August 30, 2026 |

== Critical response ==
The review aggregator Metacritic, which uses a weighted average, assigned a score of 53 out of 100 based on 4 critic reviews. IMDb reports an average rating of 6.9/10 based on 1.1K reviews, with individual episode ratings fluctuating between 6.5 and 7.4. The website also ranks the show as #2,030 on its popularity list.

Elle Muir of The Independent writes that it is "a clone of its US predecessor, only more dull." In a similar vein, Carol Midgley of The Times has compared it to "an awful blind date with no humour." Giving it two stars, Elle Hunt of The Guardian called out the show for its hypocrisy, stating that while "it aims to counter a superficial modern dating culture, it is certainly present in the pods." Even though India Block of The Standard remarked that it was a "bingeable" show, she critiqued it for falling short of its premise.

== Accolades ==
| Year | Award | Category | Nominee(s) | Result |
|---|---|---|---|---|
| 2025 | BAFTA | Reality TV | Love Is Blind: UK season 1 | Nominated |

== See also ==
- Sexy Beasts, a dating programme on Netflix with a similar premise of disguising contestants' looks with prosthetics and make-up.
- Married at First Sight, a dating programme on Peacock where participants marry strangers for a period of eight to ten weeks before they must choose to divorce or stay married.
- Perfect Match, a dating programme where former dating reality television contestants pair up and compete in challenges as they aim to become the most compatible match.
