= Patryk Misik =

Canadian soccer player

Personal information
- Full name: Patryk Krzysztof Misik
- Date of birth: November 13, 1994 (age 32)
- Place of birth: Brantford, Ontario, Canada
- Height: 1.75 m (5 ft 9 in)
- Position: Midfielder

Youth career
- Brantford Inter-City
- Toronto Lynx
- 2010: Brantford Galaxy
- 2011–2013: Śląsk Wrocław

Senior career*
Years	Team	Apps	(Gls)
2013–2014	Śląsk Wrocław II	31	(3)
2015	Ottawa Fury	5	(0)
2015	Ottawa Fury FC Academy	1	(1)
2015–2016	Raków Częstochowa	4	(0)
2016–2017	Órdenes	27	(2)
2018	Napier City Rovers	18	(6)
2018	Eastern Suburbs	1	(0)
2019–2020	Napier City Rovers		

International career
2012–2013	Canada U20	5	(2)
2017	Canada U23	2	(0)
- * Club domestic league appearances and goals

Patryk Krzysztof Misik (born November 13, 1994) is a Canadian former professional soccer player who played as a midfielder.

== Club career ==
=== Youth ===
Misik came up through the Toronto youth scene, spending time with the Toronto Lynx and Brantford Galaxy, before moving to Poland to play with Śląsk Wrocław.

=== Ottawa Fury ===
After spending the majority of his time with Śląsk Wrocław's reserve team, Misik returned to Canada and signed with NASL club Ottawa Fury FC on February 6, 2015. He made his debut for Ottawa in their season opener against the Carolina RailHawks on April 4. On June 23, 2015 the club announced it would not extend Misik's contract beyond the Spring season.

=== Raków Częstochowa ===
Four days after being released by Ottawa Misik signed with Polish club Raków Częstochowa in the II liga.

=== Órdenes ===
In August 2016, Misik signed with Spanish club SD Órdenes in the Tercera División. At the end of the 2016–17 season, Órdenes was relegated to the fifth division and Misik left the club after his contract expired.

=== Napier City Rovers ===
Misik subsequently signed with New Zealand side Napier City Rovers in the Central Premier League ahead of their 2018 season. He scored a brace in his debut on 1 April in a 7–3 win over Waterside Karori.

=== Eastern Suburbs ===
Ahead of the 2018–19 season, Misik signed with New Zealand Football Championship side Eastern Suburbs AFC. He made one appearance for Eastern Suburbs at the start of that season before departing the club.

=== Second spell at Napier City ===
Misik returned to Napier City Rovers ahead of the 2019 season. On May 11, Misik scored a goal in Napier City's 4–2 win over Palmerston North Marist in the first round of the Chatham Cup.

== International career ==
Misik is eligible to represent Canada by birth, as well as Poland due to his Polish-born parents.

In 2012, Misik accepted his first Canadian youth national team call-up for a Canada U-20 camp in November 2012. He then went on to represent Canada at the 2013 Jeux de la Francophonie. In 2017, he participated in his first Canada U-23 camp at the 2017 Aspire U-23 tournament in Qatar.

== Honours ==
Ottawa Fury

- North American Soccer League Fall season: 2015

Napier City Rovers

- Central Premier League: 2018
- Chatham Cup: 2019
