= Aly Hassan =

American professional soccer player

Personal information
- Full name: Aly Alberto Hassan
- Date of birth: May 15, 1989 (age 37)
- Place of birth: Weston, Florida, U.S.
- Height: 1.88 m (6 ft 2 in)
- Position: Forward

College career
Years	Team	Apps	(Gls)
2007–2010	Nova Southeastern Sharks	70	(36)

Senior career*
Years	Team	Apps	(Gls)
2009	Central Florida Kraze	7	(13)
2011	Central Florida Kraze	8	(16)
2012–2015	Fort Lauderdale Strikers	50	(17)
2013	→ Club Aurora (loan)	8	(3)
2015	Ottawa Fury	12	(3)
2016	Carolina RailHawks	8	(1)
2016	→ Charlotte Independence (loan)	7	(2)
2017	San Antonio FC	8	(3)
2018	Miami FC 2	2	(1)
2019	New York Cosmos	15	(11)
2021	Boca Raton FC	4	(4)

International career
2008	United States U20	2	(0)
- * Club domestic league appearances and goals as of September 24, 2020

Aly Alberto Hassan (born May 15, 1989) is an American former professional soccer player who is currently the general manager for Fort Lauderdale United.

== Career ==
On March 19, 2012, the Strikers announced that Hassan had signed professional terms with the Fort Lauderdale Strikers following a successful preseason trial.

Hassan made his professional debut with the Strikers against FC Edmonton on April 7, 2012, in the first game of the 2012 NASL season. Hassan was sent off 40 minutes into the match, following a questionable tackle on Edmonton's Fabrice Lassonde.

In his next home match, Hassan scored a hat-trick, his first professional goals, to lift the Strikers to a 3–2 victory against the Puerto Rico Islanders. Hassan recorded his second hat-trick of the season less than a month later, scoring three times against Fresno Fuego in the U.S. Open Cup Second Round match on May 22.

On January 9, 2013, the Strikers announced that Hassan will go on loan to Club Aurora.

On June 26, 2015, Hassan was transferred to Ottawa Fury after the conclusion of the Strikers' Spring season.

Hassan was named Fort Lauderdale United's first-ever general manager on May 13, 2025. In this role he oversees the soccer operations for the club's USL Super League, USL League One, USL League Two, and USL W League sides, in addition to their youth teams.

== Honors ==
Ottawa Fury

- NASL Fall Championship 2015

New York Cosmos B

- NPSL North Atlantic Conference Champion
- NPSL Northeast Region Champion
