= Marlon Freitas =

Brazilian association footballer

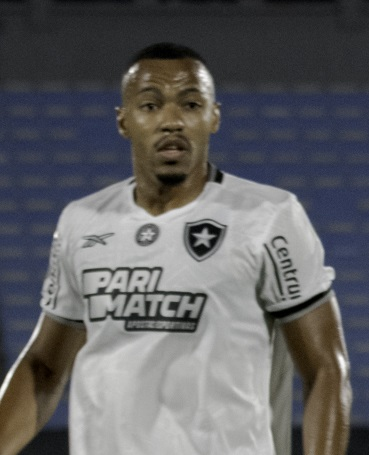
- Marlon Freitas in 2024

Personal information
- Full name: Marlon Rodrigues de Freitas
- Date of birth: 27 March 1995 (age 31)
- Place of birth: Magé, Brazil
- Height: 1.85 m (6 ft 1 in)
- Position: Midfielder

Team information
- Current team: Palmeiras
- Number: 27

Youth career
- 2013–2015: Fluminense

Senior career*
Years	Team	Apps	(Gls)
2015–2019	Fluminense	19	(1)
2015	→ Fort Lauderdale Strikers (loan)	31	(8)
2017	→ ŠTK Šamorín (loan)	16	(3)
2018	→ Criciúma (loan)	24	(1)
2019	→ Botafogo-SP (loan)	48	(3)
2020–2022	Atlético Goianiense	101	(12)
2023–2025	Botafogo	132	(4)
2026–	Palmeiras	21	(2)
- * Club domestic league appearances and goals as of 7 April 2026 ‡ National team caps and goals as of 13:06, 9 December 2022 (UTC)

Marlon Rodrigues de Freitas (born 27 March 1995), known as Marlon Freitas, is a Brazilian professional footballer who plays as a midfielder for Palmeiras.

== Club career ==
=== Fluminense ===
Marlon was born in Magé, Rio de Janeiro, and joined Fluminense's youth setup in 2013. On 17 March 2015, he moved to Fort Lauderdale Strikers on a season-long loan deal.

Marlon made his senior debut on 4 April 2015, starting in a 0–1 home loss against New York Cosmos. He scored his first goal late in the month, netting his team's second in a 3–1 away success over Ottawa Fury. He returned to Fluminense in December 2015, after scoring eight goals in 31 appearances.

Upon returning, Marlon featured as an unused substitute for Flu during the 2016 season, before joining affiliate club ŠTK Šamorín on loan on 4 January 2017. He returned to his parent club in July, and made his first team – and Série A – debut on 9 July, starting in a 1–1 away draw against Bahia.

Marlon scored his first goal for Fluminense on 26 July 2017, netting the winner in a 2–1 Copa Sudamericana away success over Universidad Católica del Ecuador. Despite featuring more regularly for the side in the remainder of the 2017 season, he lost space in the 2018 campaign, and was subsequently loaned to Série B side Criciúma on 30 May 2018.

On 2 January 2019, Botafogo-SP announced the signing of Marlon on loan for the season. An immediate starter, he only missed one match in the 2019 Série B due to suspension.

=== Atlético Goianiense ===
Ahead of the 2020 season, Marlon signed a permanent contract with Atlético Goianiense, newly promoted to the top tier. On 22 October of that year, after becoming an undisputed starter, he renewed his contract until the end of 2022.

=== Botafogo ===
He signed a contract with Botafogo in 2023. In his debut season, he was defined by Botafogo’s late-season collapse, which resulted in the loss of the Brasileirão title. The midfielder was targeted by fans' criticism, but he turned things around during the historic 2024 campaign, leading the team to both the Brasileirão and Libertadores titles as captain.

In the 2025 season, Marlon Freitas made the second-highest number of appearances for Botafogo, featuring in 58 matches—56 of which were as an undisputed starter. He trailed only behind Vitinho in this regard.

== Career statistics ==
As of 15 December 2024

Club	Season	League			State League		Cup		Continental		Other		Total	
Club	Season	Division	Apps	Goals	Apps	Goals	Apps	Goals	Apps	Goals	Apps	Goals	Apps	Goals
Fort Lauderdale Strikers	2015	NASL	31	8	—		0	0	—		—		31	8
ŠTK Šamorín	2016–17	2. Liga	16	3	—		—		—		—		16	3
Fluminense	2017	Série A	16	0	—		—		3 (Note: Appearance(s) in Copa Sudamericana)	1	1 (Note: Appearance(s) in Primeira Liga)	0	20	1
Fluminense	2018	Série A	0	0	3	1	3	0	—		—		6	1
Fluminense	Subtotal		16	0	3	1	3	0	3	1	1	0	26	2
Criciúma	2018	Série B	24	1	—		—		—		—		24	1
Botafogo-SP	2019	Série B	37	3	11	0	—		—		—		48	3
Atlético Goianiense	2020	Série A	31	0	13	1	6	1	—		—		50	2
Atlético Goianiense	2021	Série A	26	3	7	0	4	0	6	0	—		43	3
Atlético Goianiense	2022	Série A	36	4	15	4	8	1	11	1	—		70	10
Atlético Goianiense	Subtotal		93	7	35	5	18	2	17	1	—		163	15
Botafogo	2023	Série A	36	2	12	0	1	0	9	1	—		58	3
Botafogo	2024	Série A	32	0	13	2	3	0	16	0	—		64	2
Botafogo	Subtotal		68	2	25	2	4	0	25	1	—		122	5
Career total			223	22	58	6	24	2	45	3	1	0	351	33

== Honours ==
Fluminense

- Primeira Liga: 2016

Atlético Goianiense

- Campeonato Goiano: 2020, 2022

Botafogo

- Taça Rio: 2023, 2024
- Copa Libertadores: 2024
- Campeonato Brasileiro Série A: 2024

Palmeiras

- Campeonato Paulista: 2026

Individual

- Campeonato Brasileiro Série A Team of the Year: 2024
- Bola de Prata: 2024
- Copa Libertadores Team of the Tournament: 2024
- South American Team of the Year: 2024
- Campeonato Paulista Team of the Year: 2026
