= Bersyl Obassi =

Congolese footballer (born 1996)

Personal information
- Full name: Bersyl Obassi Ngatsongo
- Date of birth: 29 March 1996 (age 30)
- Place of birth: Congo
- Position: Midfielder

Senior career*
Years	Team	Apps	(Gls)
2013	ACNFF		
2014	Diables Noirs		
2014–2015	Chabab Atlas Khénifra	2	(0)
2015–2016	Étoile du Congo		
2017–2021	AS Otohô		
2018–2019	→ Stade Tunisien (loan)	8	(0)
2021–2022	Rapide Oued Zem	9	(1)
2022	Bourj	9	(2)

International career^{‡}
2013–	Congo	10	(0)
- * Club domestic league appearances and goals as of 00:00, 24 July 2022 (UTC) ‡ National team caps and goals as of 00:17, 10 February 2022 (UTC)

Bersyl Obassi (born 29 March 1996) is a Congolese professional footballer who plays as a midfielder for the Congo national team.

== Club career ==
In February 2022, he joined Bourj in the Lebanese Premier League, ahead of the second leg of the 2021–22 season.

== International career ==
In January 2014, coach Claude Leroy, invited him to be a part of the Congo squad for the 2014 African Nations Championship. The team was eliminated in the group stages after losing to Ghana, drawing with Libya and defeating Ethiopia.
