= Love Is Blind: UK season 1 =

Love Is Blind: UK
- Season 1
- Presented by: Matt Willis; Emma Willis
- No. of episodes: 12

Release
- Original network: Netflix
- Original release: 7 August – 26 August 2024

Season chronology
- Next → Season 2

The first season of Love Is Blind: UK premiered on Netflix from 7 August 2024 to 21 August 2024, as a three-week event. A reunion episode was released on 26 August 2024. This season followed a group singles from the England, Northern Ireland, Scotland, the Republic of Ireland and the Channel Islands.

== Season summary ==
Couples	Married	Still together	Relationship notes
Bobby and Jasmine	Yes	Yes	Bobby and Jasmine got married in 2023. In the reunion filmed one year later, it was revealed that Bobby had moved to London and they were still together. In June 2025, they announced that they were pregnant with a boy.
Benaiah and Nicole	Yes	No	The couple became engaged after the pods and met the rest of the couples in Corfu. Benaiah and Nicole got married in 2023. At the reunion it was revealed they were still together and living with each other. In October 2026, Nicole announced that they had separated.
Steven and Sabrina	Yes	No	Steven and Sabrina got married in 2023. In the reunion filmed one year later, it was revealed that Steven and Sabrina were no longer together. Their issues had been compounded by a long-distance relationship.
Freddie and Catherine	No	No	They did not get married. Catherine said yes, but Freddie felt the time was not right for them. After she left, he told her family that he still wanted her in his life. She, however, said it would take a lot for her to "bounce back".
Ollie and Demi	No	No	After a lack of contact before the wedding, Demi chose not to marry Ollie at the altar. Ollie asked her why, and she stated it was an "I do not, for now", rather than a firm no.
Tom and Maria	No	No	Split on wedding day. Tom said no, stating that they had some differences, which he hadn't had enough time to work through. Maria would have said yes. At the reunion it was revealed that their differences had not been resolved.
Sam and Nicole	No	No	They got engaged but did not go to Corfu with the rest of the couples. They both separately confessed to not feeling the connection in the real world and thus ended their engagement.

== Participants ==
Participants from the first series were revealed on 24 July 2024.

Name	Age	Occupation	Hometown	Relationship Status
Sabrina Egerton	35	Director of Marketing and Communications	Belfast, Northern Ireland	Married, split after the wedding
Steven Smith	37	Gym Owner	London, England	Married, split after the wedding
Jasmine Chamberlain	29	Mental Health Nurse	London, England	Married
Bobby Johnson	33	Luxury Shopping Guide	Staffordshire, England	Married
Nicole Stevens	29	Head of Brand and Marketing	Surrey, England	Married, split after the wedding
Benaiah Grunewald Brydie	33	Structural Landscaper	Preston, England	Married, split after the wedding
Demi Brown	30	Safeguarding and Attendance Manager	London, England	Split at the wedding
Ollie Sutherland	33	Software Sales	London, England	Split at the wedding
Catherine Richards	29	Dental Nurse	Jersey, Channel Islands	Split at the wedding
Freddie Powell	32	Funeral Director	Salford, England	Split at the wedding
Maria Benkhermaz	30	Makeup Artist	Southampton, England	Split at the wedding
Tom Stroud	38	PR and Advertising Consultant	London, England	Split at the wedding
Sam Klein	31	Product Design Manager	London, England	Briefly engaged to Nicole; split before the wedding
Conor Griffin	31	Health Food Business Owner	Dublin, Republic of Ireland	Briefly engaged off-camera, split before the wedding
Olivia Lavelle	28	Creative Project Director	London, England	Briefly engaged off-camera, split before the wedding
Aaron Murrell	33	Chicken Restaurateur	Milton Keynes, England	Not engaged
Charlie Mawson	34	Gym General Manager	Hertfordshire, England	Not engaged
Ella Liliana	27	Social Worker	Derbyshire, England	Not engaged
Elle	27	Graphic Designer	London, England	Not engaged
Jake Singleton-Hill	32	Civil Engineer	Leicestershire, England	Not engaged
Joanes	31	Resident Service Manager	Luton, England	Not engaged
Jordan Baker	32	Fashion Tech Founder	Surrey, England	Not engaged
Lisa Hendrie	34	Baby Photographer	Edinburgh, Scotland	Not engaged
Natasha Waters	32	Careers Coordinator	Cheshire, England	Not engaged
Priyanka "Priya" Grewal	37	Procurement Manager	Berkshire, England	Not engaged
Ria Prosser	34	Commercial Contracts Manager	London, England	Not engaged
Richie	30	Sports Turf Maintenance Director	Gloucestershire, England	Not engaged
Ryan Williams	31	Techno DJ and Cellist	Edinburgh, Scotland	Not engaged
Sharlotte Ritchie	35	Global Communications Director	London, England	Not engaged
Shirley Bekker	27	Junior Doctor	London, England	Not engaged

=== Future appearances ===
In 2025, Ollie Sutherland and Freddie Powell competed on season 3 of Perfect Match.

== Episodes ==
Love Is Blind: UK series 1 episodes
No. overall	No. in season	Title	Original release date
Week 1
1	1	"The Pods Are Open"	7 August 2024
2	2	"Two’s A Couple, Three’s A Love Triangle"	7 August 2024
3	3	"He’s Here for Fame"	7 August 2024
4	4	"We Had Sex… Twice!"	7 August 2024
Week 2
5	5	"I Made a Mistake"	14 August 2024
6	6	"Once a Cheat, Always a Cheat"	14 August 2024
7	7	"Is She Good Enough for You?"	14 August 2024
8	8	"Guess Who's Back"	14 August 2024
9	9	"He Wants a Prenup"	14 August 2024
Week 3: The Altar
10	10	"See You at the Altar"	21 August 2024
11	11	"We're Not Ready"	21 August 2024
Special
12	12	"The Reunion"	26 August 2024

== Unaired engagements ==
According to contestant Shirley Bekker, a total of eleven couples got engaged during season 1, with only 4 participants remaining single after filming in the pods concluded. In addition to the seven couples shown on the series, Netflix has also acknowledged that Olivia Lavelle and Conor Griffin got engaged on the show. Reportedly, three other undisclosed matches exist; however, this has never been officially confirmed.

After getting engaged in the pods, Lavelle and Griffin took a multi-week long trip to Greece together off-camera. Upon returning home, the couple faced a number of "challenges to the relationship" due to its long-distance nature before ultimately deciding "it would be better to remain as friends."

== Production ==
Filming for this season took place across multiple countries within Europe, in August and September 2023 and lasted presumably between 35 and 40 days until the weddings. The ten days in the pods were shot in Stockholm, Sweden, reusing the set from Love Is Blind: Sweden. The post-pod honeymoons for the six engaged couples were then filmed at the Angsana Corfu Resort & Spa in Corfu, Greece. After the retreat, the couples moved in together in serviced apartments at STAY in Camden, London where they spent the rest of the time filming up until the weddings. The weddings took place at Wynyard Hall in Stockton-on-Tees in County Durham in England.
