= Love Is Blind: UK season 3 =

Love Is Blind: UK
- Season 3
- Presented by: Matt Willis; Emma Willis
- No. of episodes: 11

Release
- Original network: Netflix
- Original release: 19 August – 30 August 2026

Season chronology
- ← Previous; Season 2

The third season of Love Is Blind: UK aired on Netflix from 19 August 2026 to 27 August 2026, as a two-week event. The reunion episode was released on 30 August 2026. It follows a group of thirty singles from England, Wales, and Scotland.

== Season summary ==
Couples	Married	Still together	Relationship notes
Taylor and Sophie	Yes	Yes	Taylor and Sophie got married in 2025. At the reunion, they revealed that they were still together and had moved together in Hertfordshire.
Ajay and Ciara	Yes	Yes	Ajay and Ciara got married in 2025. At the reunion, they revealed that they were still together and in the process of planning their "big, fat Indian wedding".
Jack and Faye	Yes	Yes	Jack and Faye got married in 2025. At the reunion, they revealed they were still together.
Joseph and Francesca	Yes	Yes	Joseph and Francesca got married in 2025. At the reunion, they revealed that they were still together and were planning to have a traditional Nigerian wedding as well.
Ryan and Cuba	No	No	They split up shortly after Ryan returned to the experiment as he was uncertain about his feelings.
Jordan and Yasmin	No	No	They split up shortly after the mixer as Jordan did not feel he would fall in love with Yasmin by the time of the wedding. At the reunion, they revealed they had since become best-friends.

== Participants ==
The participants for this season were revealed on 5 August 2026.

Name	Age	Occupation	Hometown	Relationship Status
Sophie Tregaskiss	27	Operations Team Leader	Greater Manchester, England	Married
Taylor Burgen	31	Head of Sales	Hertfordshire, England	Married
Ciara Murphy	29	Pilates Instructor	London, England	Married
Ajay Cheema	33	Fitness Coach	London, England	Married
Faye Domaille	28	Executive Assistant	London, England	Married
Jack Bradshaw	30	Chef	Cornwall, England	Married
Francesca Emmanuel	29	HR Associate	London, England	Married
Joseph Subuola	33	Senior Project Manager	London, England	Married
Cuba Riggs	29	Yoga and Fitness Instructor	London, England	Split before the wedding
Ryan Roberts	33	Public Speaker and Entrepreneur	Manchester, England	Split before the wedding
Yasmin Toseafa	32	Physician Associate	London, England	Split before the wedding
Jordan Taylor	29	Teacher	Birmingham, England	Split before the wedding
Alex Begyinah	33	Business Management Manager	Birmingham, England	Not engaged
Blue Braithwaite	32	Plasterer	London, England	Not engaged
Chevanique T	29	Sexual Health Nurse	Birmingham, England	Not engaged
George Morgan	32	Bank Relationship Manager and Wine Bar Owner	Derby, England	Not engaged
Hannah Connolly	27	Chartered Accountant	Leeds, England	Not engaged
Jacob	32	Business Owner	Colchester, England	Not engaged
Jonathan Harrold	32	Tech Recruiter	Hertfordshire, England	Not engaged
Katie Linsky	30	Project Manager	Doncaster, England	Not engaged
Komel Waqar	34	Senior Finance Officer	Glasgow, Scotland	Not engaged
Luke Watson	29	Planning Officer	Doncaster, England	Not engaged
Lydia James	31	Senior Product Manager	Cardiff, Wales	Not engaged
Met Emir	35	Technology Recruiter	London	Not engaged
Mike Mitchell	31	Teaching Assistant	Preston, England	Not engaged
Monum	29	Audiologist	Bury, England	Not engaged
Nieve Ewing	27	Car Salesperson	Perth, Scotland	Not engaged
Sammy Harper	31	Wellbeing Coach and Entrepreneur	Manchester, England	Not engaged
Si Bucknell	36	Motorsport Technician	Gloucestershire, England	Not engaged
Zelania Ann-Marie	29	Marketing Manager	London, England	Not engaged

== Episodes ==
Love Is Blind: UK series 2 episodes
No. overall	No. in season	Title	Original release date
Week 1
27	1	"Gotta Stop Telling These Girls I Love Them!"	19 August 2026
28	2	"You Can't Even Remember Her Name!"	19 August 2026
29	3	"Is This Too Good to be True?"	19 August 2026
30	4	"Wow, Wow, Wow, Wow, Wow!"	19 August 2026
31	5	"I'm Anything But Boring"	19 August 2026
32	6	"If You Need To Walk Away, Walk Away"	19 August 2026
33	7	"No-one Is Butthurt"	19 August 2026
34	8	"I Look Like a Clown"	19 August 2026
Week 2
35	9	"Are You Ready for the Real World?"	26 August 2026
36	10	"Do I Have Your Blessing?"	26 August 2026
Special
37	11	"The Reunion"	30 August 2026

== Unaired engagements ==
There were eight unaired engagements during this season. Chevanique and an unnamed male participant were the only two individuals to leave the pods still single. On 27 August 2025, Sammy Harper and Jon Harold revealed that they are the only unaired couple who is still together and engaged, with the other seven having only lasted two days.

== Production ==
Filming for this season took place across multiple countries within Europe. The ten days in the pods were shot in Stockholm, reusing the set from Swedish edition of the show for a third year running. The post-pod honeymoons for the six engaged couples were then filmed at the 7Pines Resort by Hyatt in Ibiza, Spain.

After the retreat, the couples moved in together in serviced apartments in London where they spent the rest of the time filming up until the weddings. The weddings took place at Ragley Hall in Warwickshire, England.
