= Love Is Blind: UK season 2 =

Love Is Blind: UK
- Season 2
- Presented by: Matt Willis; Emma Willis
- No. of episodes: 14

Release
- Original network: Netflix
- Original release: 13 August – 31 August 2025

Season chronology
- ← Previous; Season 1 Next → Season 3

The second season of Love Is Blind: UK premiered on Netflix from 13 August 2025 to 27 August 2025, as a three-week event. A reunion episode was released on 31 August 2025. It follows a group of thirty singles from England, Wales, Northern Ireland, Scotland and the Republic of Ireland.

== Season summary ==
Couples	Married	Still together	Relationship notes
Kieran and Megan	Yes	Yes	Kieran and Megan got married in 2024. At the reunion, filmed one year later, it was revealed that they were still together and living with each other.
Billy and Ashleigh	Yes	No	Billy and Ashleigh got married in 2024. At the reunion, it was revealed that they had gotten divorced in January 2025 due to personal differences and a lack of compatibility.
Kal and Sarover	Yes	No	Kal and Sarover got married in 2024. At the reunion, it was revealed that they had separated in January 2025. Kal made the decision as he felt they were incompatible, the spark was gone, and they had grown into different people. The breakup came as a shock to Sarover.
Jed and Bardha	No	No	They did not get married, as Bardha said no at the altar. She did, however, reassure Jed that she still wanted to be in a relationship and this was not a firm rejection, but rather a “when we’re ready”. At the reunion, it was revealed that they had briefly dated after the wedding, but ultimately broke up.
Javen and Katisha	No	No	They split up shortly after the mixer. Javen allegedly spent the after-party with Aanu, Yolanda, and Sophie. He never mentioned this to Katisha, who instead heard it from Megan, and promptly ended the engagement.

== Participants ==
The participants for this season were revealed on 30th July 2025.

Name	Age	Occupation	Hometown	Relationship Status
Megan Jupp	28	Dance and Fitness Instructor	London, England	Married
Kieran Holmes-Darby	28	Gaming Entrepreneur	London, England	Married
Ashleigh Berry	30	Cabin Crew Manager	Surrey, England	Split after the wedding
Billy Jervis	35	Army Physical Trainer	Bangor, Northern Ireland	Split after the wedding
Sarover Aujla	29	Medical Company Owner	Buckinghamshire, England	Split after the wedding
Kal Pasha	32	Gym Owner	Wigan, England	Split after the wedding
Bardha Krasniqi	32	Sales and Marketing Director	London, England	Split at the wedding
Jed Chouman	31	Configuration Manager	Essex, England	Split at the wedding
Katisha Atkinson	31	Nanny and Makeup Artist	Dumfries, Scotland	Split before the wedding
Javen Palmer	28	Health Coach	Kent, England	Split before the wedding
Amy Jane	33	Primary School Teacher	Brecon, Wales	Briefly engaged off-camera, split before the wedding
Ross B	32	Builder	Dunstable, England	Briefly engaged off-camera, split before the wedding
Aanu	29	Singer	Essex, England	Not engaged
Charlie Antony	28	Electrical Engineer	Essex, England	Not engaged
Chris O'Byrne	33	Project Manager	Sussex, England	Not engaged
Christine Hogan	35	Human Resources Operations Lead	Athlacca, Republic of Ireland	Not engaged
Danielle Kelly	33	Estate Agent	Portsmouth, England	Not engaged
Demola Ayilara	31	Financial Analyst	Essex, England	Not engaged
Holly	30	Private Chef	London, England	Not engaged
Jack Rogers	33	App Creator and Founder	London, England	Not engaged
James Clark	36	Real Estate Manager	Skegness, England	Not engaged
Jordan	29	Lift Engineer	Bristol, England	Not engaged
Laurie Marie	37	Interior Stylist	London, England	Not engaged
Loll Sturgess	31	Sales Account Manager	Bedfordshire, England	Not engaged
Patrick Justus	33	Human Design Coach	London, England	Not engaged
Ross Millington	30	Barber Shop Owner	Cheshire, England	Not engaged
Sophie Willett	28	Senior Commercial Manager	Manchester, England	Not engaged
Tara Mason	33	Café Owner	Wicklow, Republic of Ireland	Not engaged
Tom Jackson	35	Retired Pub Landlord	London, England	Not engaged
Yolanda	26	Specialist Occupational Therapist	Hampshire, England	Not engaged

=== Future appearances ===
In 2026, Sophie Willett appeared on season four of Perfect Match.

== Episodes ==
Love Is Blind: UK series 2 episodes
No. overall	No. in season	Title	Original release date
Week 1
13	1	"Eat, Sleep, Date, Repeat"	13 August 2025
14	2	"This Is How Triangles Ares Formed"	13 August 2025
15	3	"Trust My Spleen"	13 August 2025
16	4	"She Changed Her Mind Overnight"	13 August 2025
Week 2
17	5	"I Don't Want To Be a Villain"	20 August 2025
18	6	"Good Guys Finish Last"	20 August 2025
19	7	"You're Trying to Get Me in Trouble"	20 August 2025
20	8	"Walking Away"	20 August 2025
Week 3
21	9	"Don't Let Anyone Dim Your Sparkle"	27 August 2025
22	10	"A Risk Worth Taking?"	27 August 2025
Special
23	11	"The Reunion"	31 August 2025
After The Altar
24	12	"You're Still Married!"	12 July 2026
25	13	"I'm Here To Cause Some Chaos"	12 July 2026
26	14	"Falling In Love With You More and More"	12 July 2026

== Unaired engagements ==
Amy Jane and Ross M got engaged during the show, but the scene was left out of the final cut and never shown to viewers. They broke up after their first night out together due to having different values. Shortly after, Jane briefly dated James Clark, who she had also formed a serious connection with in the pods.

== Production ==
Filming for this season took place across multiple countries within Europe, in October 2024 and lasted presumably between 35 and 40 days until the weddings. The ten days in the pods were shot in Stockholm, Sweden, reusing the set from Love Is Blind: Sweden. The post-pod honeymoons for the five engaged couples were then filmed at the Cap St George Hotel and Resort in Peyia, Cyprus.

After the retreat, the couples moved in together in serviced apartments at Ducie Street Warehouse in Manchester where they spent the rest of the time filming up until the weddings. The weddings took place at Coos’ Cathedral in Aboyne Castle in Aberdeenshire, Scotland.
