= 2017 Ottawa Fury FC season =

Ottawa Fury FC
2017 season
- President: John Pugh
- Head Coach: Paul Dalglish (until 15 August); Julian de Guzman (from 15 August)
- Stadium: TD Place Stadium
- USL: 10th, East
- USL Cup: Did not qualify
- Canadian Championship: Semi-finals
- Top goalscorer: League: Steevan Dos Santos (10); All: Steevan Dos Santos (12)
- Highest home attendance: 7,780 (6/24 v. NY)
- Lowest home attendance: 2,567 (5/3 v. EDM, CC)
- Average home league attendance: 5,365
- Biggest win: League/All: OTT 4–0 CIN (10/8)
- Biggest defeat: League: ORL 3–0 OTT (8/16); All: TOR 4–0 OTT (5/31, CC)
Home colours	Away colours

The 2017 Ottawa Fury FC season was the club's 4th season at the professional level and its first in the United Soccer League.

== Squad ==
As of 14 October 2017

No.	Name	Nationality	Position	Date of birth (age)	Signed from	Signed in	Apps.	Goals
Goalkeepers
1	Callum Irving	(Canada)	GK	16 March 1993 (aged 24)	(United States) Rio Grande Valley Toros	2017	36	0
23	Andrew MacRae	(Canada)	GK	24 August 1990 (aged 27)	Unattached	2016	0	0
70	David Paulmin	(Canada) (France)	GK	24 January 1996 (aged 21)	FC Montreal	2017	0	0
Defenders
3	Eddie Edward	(Canada)	RB/CB	20 September 1988 (aged 29)	FC Edmonton	2016	46	2
4	Ramon Martin Del Campo	(Mexico) (United States)	CB/FB	5 July 1993 (aged 24)	Puerto Rico FC	2017	28	2
5	Kyle Venter	(United States)	CB	13 March 1991 (aged 26)	(United States) Tulsa Roughnecks	2016	17	0
6	Shane McEleney	(Republic of Ireland) (Northern Ireland)	CB	31 January 1991 (aged 26)	(Republic of Ireland) St Patrick's Athletic	2017	25	0
12	Andrae Campbell	(Jamaica) (United States)	LB	14 March 1989 (aged 28)	(United States) Orange County Blues	2017	30	0
14	Onua Obasi	(England) (United States)	LB/CB	24 September 1988 (aged 29)	(United States) Rochester Rhinos	2016	44	2
26	Thomas Meilleur-Giguère	(Canada)	CB	13 November 1997 (aged 19)	FC Montreal	2017	4	0
59	Aron Mkungilwa	(Canada) (Democratic Republic of the Congo)	LB	3 May 1996 (aged 21)	FC Montreal	2017	4	0
Midfielders
2	Jonathan Barden	(England)	CM/RB	9 November 1992 (aged 24)	(Iceland) ÍBV	2017	29	1
7	Ryan Williams	(England)	CM/LW	8 April 1991 (aged 26)	(Scotland) Inverness CT	2016	38	9
10	Gerardo Bruna	(Argentina) (Spain)	CM/FW	29 January 1991 (aged 26)	(England) Accrington Stanley	2016	33	1
22	Jamar Dixon	(Canada) (Jamaica)	CM/RB	5 June 1989 (aged 28)	(Finland) FF Jaro	2016	44	2
24	Jimmy-Shammar Sanon	(Haiti) (Canada)	MF	24 January 1997 (aged 20)	FC Montreal	2017	13	1
25	Lance Rozeboom (c)	(United States)	CM/CB	31 May 1989 (aged 28)	(United States) Austin Aztex	2016	60	2
28	Sergio Manesio	(England) (Angola)	CM/CB	1 July 1994 (aged 23)	Unattached	2017	21	0
Forwards
8	Steevan Dos Santos	(Cape Verde)	CF	17 December 1989 (aged 27)	(United States) Rochester Rhinos	2017	29	12
9	Carl Haworth	(Canada) (England)	FW	9 July 1989 (aged 28)	Ottawa Fury (PDL)	2014	106	14
11	Sito Seoane	(United States) (Spain)	FW	16 March 1989 (aged 28)	(Iceland) Fylkir	2017	32	7
15	Nick DePuy	(United States)	CF	14 November 1994 (aged 22)	loan from Montreal Impact	2017	8	2
17	Azake Luboyera	(Uganda)	FW	6 April 1998 (aged 19)	Unattached	2017	6	1
18	Tucker Hume	(United States)	CF	22 August 1993 (aged 24)	(United States) Portland Timbers U23s	2017	26	3
30	Adonijah Reid	(Canada) (Jamaica)	FW	13 August 1999 (aged 18)	loan from (United States) FC Dallas	2017	12	1

== Transfers ==
=== In ===
Date	Position	Nationality	Name	From	Fee
10 November 2016	DF	(Jamaica)	Andrae Campbell	(United States) Orange County Blues	Free
10 November 2016	FW	(United States)	Sito Seoane	(Iceland) Fylkir	Free
17 November 2016	FW	(Cape Verde)	Steevan Dos Santos	(United States) Rochester Rhinos	Free
5 December 2016	DF	(Republic of Ireland)	Shane McEleney	(Republic of Ireland) St Patrick's Athletic	Free
6 December 2016	GK	(Canada)	Callum Irving	(United States) Rio Grande Valley Toros	Free
10 January 2017	DF	(Mexico)	Ramon Martin Del Campo	Puerto Rico FC	Free
12 January 2017	MF	(England)	Jonathan Barden	(Iceland) ÍBV	Free
25 January 2017	MF	(England)	Sergio Manesio	Unattached	Free
1 February 2017	FW	(United States)	Tucker Hume	(United States) Portland Timbers U23s	Free
9 February 2017	GK	(Canada)	David Paulmin	FC Montreal	Free
17 February 2017	DF	(Canada)	Thomas Meilleur-Giguère	FC Montreal	Free
17 February 2017	DF	(Canada)	Aron Mkungilwa	FC Montreal	Free
23 March 2017	MF	(Haiti)	Jimmy-Shammar Sanon	FC Montreal	Free
3 May 2017	FW	(Belize)	Michael Salazar	Montreal Impact	Loan
12 May 2017	FW	(United States)	Nick DePuy	Montreal Impact	Loan
7 July 2017	FW	(Canada)	Adonijah Reid	(United States) FC Dallas	Loan
20 July 2017	FW	(Uganda)	Azake Luboyera	Unattached	Free
15 August 2017	DF	(Canada)	Wandrille Lefèvre	Montreal Impact	Loan

=== Out ===
Date	Position	Nationality	Name	To	Fee
1 December 2016	FW	(Democratic Republic of the Congo)	Danny Mwanga	(United States) Tampa Bay Rowdies	Loan end
1 December 2016	MF	(Uruguay)	Bryan Olivera	(Brazil) Fluminense	Loan end
1 December 2016	DF	(Canada)	Mallan Roberts	FC Edmonton	Loan end
1 December 2016	DF	(Brazil)	Fernando Timbó	(United States) Orlando City B	Free
12 December 2016	GK	(France)	Romuald Peiser	(United States) San Francisco Deltas	Free
13 December 2016	MF	(Canada)	Mozzi Gyorio	Unattached	Free
16 December 2016	GK	(Canada)	Marcel DeBellis	(United States) Richmond Kickers	Free
31 January 2017	FW	(United States)	Giuseppe Gentile	Puerto Rico FC	Free
3 February 2017	MF	(England)	James Bailey	(England) Carlisle United	Free
14 February 2017	MF	(Canada)	Mauro Eustáquio	FC Edmonton	Free
16 February 2017	DF	(Brazil)	Rafael Alves	(Brazil) Juventude	Free
17 February 2017	FW	(Northern Ireland)	Thomas Stewart	(Republic of Ireland) Dundalk	Free
24 February 2017	DF	(Canada)	Maxim Tissot	(United States) D.C. United	Free
8 March 2017	DF	(United States)	Rich Balchan	(United States) Pittsburgh Riverhounds	Free
15 March 2017	DF	(Canada)	Kyle Porter	(United States) Tampa Bay Rowdies	Free

== Friendlies ==
=== Pre-season ===
17 February 2017	Ottawa Fury	7 – 0	Ottawa Internationals	Ottawa
20:30 EST (UTC−5)	Seoane (pen.); Hume x4 Bruna x2	Report		Stadium: University of Ottawa

21 February 2017	Saint Louis FC	1 – 2	Ottawa Fury	Bradenton, Florida
18:00 EST (UTC−5)	Kidd 70'	Report	Obasi (red card) 28'; Seoane 51'; Williams 73'	Stadium: IMG Academy

23 February 2017	Oklahoma City Energy	1 – 2	Ottawa Fury	Bradenton, Florida
18:00 EST (UTC−5)	Barril (yellow card) 20'; Rasmussen 36'; Covarrubias (yellow card) 47'; Andrews (yellow card) 49'	Report	Campbell (yellow card) 22'; Rozeboom (red card) 28'; Bruna 34', 67' (pen.); Hume (yellow card) 80'	Stadium: IMG Academy

25 February 2017	FC Cincinnati	1 – 1	Ottawa Fury	Bradenton, Florida
16:00 EST (UTC−5)	Dominguez (yellow card) 12' (yellow-red card) 47'; Walker (yellow card) 15'; Fall 45'; Hildebrandt (yellow card) 66'; Quinn (yellow card) 85'	Report	Williams (yellow card) 26'; Haworth 68'	Stadium: IMG Academy

3 March 2017	Toronto FC II	2 – 1	Ottawa Fury	Toronto
15:00 EST (UTC−5)	James 19', 43'; (yellow card) 62'	Report	Dos Santos 11' (pen.); Irving (yellow card) 81'	Stadium: KIA Field

10 March 2017	Ottawa Fury	0 – 3	Rochester Rhinos	Ottawa
9:30 EST (UTC−5)	Del Campo (yellow card) 45'	Report	Defregger 76' (pen.), 81'; Brown 87'	Stadium: University of Ottawa

17 March 2017	Ottawa Fury	4 – 2	League1 Ontario All-Stars	Ottawa
16:15 EST (UTC−5)	Seoane 15', 61'; Williams 34' (pen.); Mkungilwa (yellow card) 35'; Meilleur-Giguère (yellow card) 75'; Dos Santos 86'	Report	Triantafillou 67'; Frano (yellow card) 69'; Ryane 83'	Stadium: University of Ottawa

24 March 2017	Montreal Impact	0 – 2	Ottawa Fury	Montreal
14:00 EST (UTC−5)			Seoane; Dos Santos

=== Mid-season ===
12 July 2017	Ottawa Fury	0 – 1	Montreal Impact	Ottawa
19:00 EST (UTC−5)		Report	Mallace 3'	Stadium: TD Place Stadium; Attendance: 6,601; Referee: Carol-Anne Chénard

=== Friendly statistics ===
Rnk	Pos	Nat	Name	Goals	Assists
1	FW	(United States)	Sito Seoane	5	0
2	MF	(Argentina)	Gerardo Bruna	4	3
2	FW	(United States)	Tucker Hume	4	3
4	FW	(Cape Verde)	Steevan Dos Santos	3	0
5	MF	(England)	Ryan Williams	2	2
6	FW	(Canada)	Carl Haworth	1	0
7	MF	(England)	Jonathan Barden	0	1
Total				19	9

== Competitions ==
=== United Soccer League ===
==== Standings ====
Pos	Team	Pld	W	D	L	GF	GA	GD	Pts	Qualification
1	Louisville City FC (C)	32	18	8	6	58	31	+27	62	Conference Playoffs
2	Charleston Battery	32	15	9	8	53	33	+20	54	Conference Playoffs
3	Tampa Bay Rowdies	32	14	11	7	50	35	+15	53	Conference Playoffs
4	Rochester Rhinos	32	14	11	7	36	28	+8	53	Conference Playoffs
5	Charlotte Independence	32	13	9	10	52	40	+12	48	Conference Playoffs
6	FC Cincinnati	32	12	10	10	46	48	−2	46	Conference Playoffs
7	New York Red Bulls II	32	13	5	14	57	60	−3	44	Conference Playoffs
8	Bethlehem Steel FC	32	12	8	12	46	45	+1	44	Conference Playoffs
9	Orlando City B	32	10	12	10	37	36	+1	42	
10	Ottawa Fury	32	8	14	10	42	41	+1	38	
11	Harrisburg City Islanders	32	10	7	15	28	47	−19	37	
12	Saint Louis FC	32	9	9	14	35	48	−13	36	
13	Pittsburgh Riverhounds	32	8	12	12	33	42	−9	36	
14	Richmond Kickers	32	8	8	16	24	36	−12	32	
15	Toronto FC II	32	6	7	19	27	54	−27	25	

Source: 2017 USL standings
Rules for classification: 1) total wins; 2) total goal differential; 3) total goals scored; 4) points earned against top four Conference finishers; 5) disciplinary points; 6) coin toss or drawing of lots
(C) Champions

==== Results summary ====
Overall								Home						Away					
Pld	W	D	L	GF	GA	GD	Pts	W	D	L	GF	GA	GD	W	D	L	GF	GA	GD
32	8	14	10	42	41	+1	38	6	8	2	26	16	+10	2	6	8	16	25	−9

Last updated: October 14, 2017.
Source: Match reports

==== Results by round ====
Round	1	2	3	4	5	6	7	8	9	10	11	12	13	14	15	16	17	18	19	20	21	22	23	24	25	26	27	28	29	30	31	32
Ground	A	A	A	H	A	H	H	A	H	A	H	A	H	H	A	A	H	H	H	H	A	A	A	H	H	A	A	H	A	H	H	A
Result	L	L	W	D	D	D	L	W	W	D	W	L	W	D	L	L	D	W	L	W	L	D	L	D	D	D	D	D	L	D	W	D
Position	12	15	13	14	14	12	14	10	6	11	6	9	6	5	8	10	11	9	10	10	10	10	12	12	12	12	12	12	13	13	11	10

Updated to match(es) played on October 14, 2017. Source: Match reports
A = Away; H = Home; W = Win; D = Draw; L = Loss

==== Match reports ====
1 April 2017 1	Saint Louis FC	3 – 2	Ottawa Fury	Fenton, MO
20:30 EDT (UTC-04:00)	Volesky 5'; Bjurman 9'; Alvarez (yellow card) 80'; Manesio 88' (o.g.)	Report	Edward 11'; Obasi 83'; Del Campo (yellow card) 85'; Campbell (yellow card) 90'; McEleney (red card) 90+5'	Stadium: World Wide Technology Soccer Park; Attendance: 5,566; Referee: Dule Djurasevic

8 April 2017 2	Tampa Bay Rowdies	1 – 0	Ottawa Fury	St. Petersburg, FL
19:30 EDT (UTC-04:00)	Hristov 47'; King (yellow card) 51'	Report	Campbell (yellow card) 50'; Obasi (yellow card) 83'	Stadium: Al Lang Stadium; Attendance: 5,310; Referee: Matthew Miscannon

15 April 2017 3	Richmond Kickers	0 – 1	Ottawa Fury	Richmond
17:00 EDT (UTC-04:00)	Roberts (yellow card) 54'; Tissot (yellow card) 81'	Report	McEleney (yellow card) 34'; Barden (yellow card) 59'; Campbell (yellow card) 68'; Dos Santos 79'	Stadium: City Stadium; Attendance: 4,974; Referee: Kevin Broadley

22 April 2017 4	Ottawa Fury	0 – 0	Toronto FC II	Ottawa
14:00 EDT (UTC-04:00)	Campbell (red card) 84'	Report	Uccello (yellow card) 18'; McCrary (yellow card) 74'; Aubrey (yellow card) 84'	Stadium: TD Place Stadium; Attendance: 6,502; Referee: Pierre-Luc Lauzière

29 April 2017 5	Charleston Battery	2 – 2	Ottawa Fury	Charleston
19:00 EDT (UTC-04:00)	Ro. Williams 41', 84', (yellow card) 73'	Report	Ry. Williams 22'; Del Campo 56'	Stadium: MUSC Health Stadium; Attendance: 6,563; Referee: Christopher Spivey

6 May 2017 6	Ottawa Fury	0 – 0	Tampa Bay Rowdies	Ottawa
14:00 EDT (UTC-04:00)	Salazar (yellow card) 63'	Report	Hristov (yellow card) 18'; Chavez (yellow card) 29'; King (yellow card) 33'	Stadium: TD Place Stadium; Attendance: 3,840; Referee: Yusri Rudolf

13 May 2017 7	Ottawa Fury	0 – 1	Pittsburgh Riverhounds	Ottawa
14:00 EDT (UTC-04:00)	Rozeboom (yellow card) 88'; Manesio (yellow card) 90'	Report	Washington (yellow card) 39'; Hertzog 52'	Stadium: TD Place Stadium; Attendance: 3,024; Referee: Carol Anne Chénard

20 May 2017 8	New York Red Bulls II	3 – 4	Ottawa Fury	Montclair, NJ
16:00 EDT (UTC-04:00)	Flemmings 20', (yellow card) 68'; Allen 56' (pen.); Mines 69'; Abidor (yellow card) 89'	Report	Hume 14'; Edward (yellow card) 18'; Manesio (yellow card) 36'; Seoane 51'; McEleney (yellow card) 66'; Salazar 87'; Williams 90' (pen.)	Stadium: MSU Soccer Park; Attendance: 592; Referee: Elvis Osmanovic

27 May 2017 9	Ottawa Fury	5 – 3	Richmond Kickers	Ottawa
14:00 EDT (UTC-04:00)	Seoane 9', 38'; Rozeboom 69'; Hume 73'; Sanon 90'	Report	Gonzalez (yellow card) 9'; Kamara 34', 49', 59'; Durkin (yellow card) 56'; Jane (yellow card) 84'	Stadium: TD Place Stadium; Attendance: 4,294; Referee: Carol Anne Chénard

4 June 2017 10	Bethlehem Steel FC	1 – 1	Ottawa Fury	Bethlehem
17:00 EDT (UTC-04:00)	Jones (yellow card) 4'; Conneh 28'; Tribbett (yellow card) 87'	Report	Obasi (yellow card) 2'; Barden (yellow card) 34'; Salazar 70'	Stadium: Goodman Stadium; Attendance: 2,988; Referee: Mark Kadlecik

10 June 2017 11	Ottawa Fury	1 – 0	Harrisburg City Islanders	Ottawa
19:00 EDT (UTC-04:00)	Obasi (yellow card) 32'; Seoane 55'	Report	Nishanian (yellow card) 34'; Mohamed (yellow card) 74'; McLaws (yellow card) 78'	Stadium: TD Place Stadium; Attendance: 4,770; Referee: Marie-Soleil Beaudoin

17 June 2017 12	Rochester Rhinos	1 – 0	Ottawa Fury	Rochester
18:05 EDT (UTC-04:00)	Felix 19', (yellow card) 28'; Farrell (yellow card) 78'; Tergou (yellow card) 90+4'	Report		Stadium: Capelli Sport Stadium; Attendance: 2,548; Referee: Lorant Varga

20 June 2017 13	Ottawa Fury	1 – 0	Orlando City B	Ottawa
11:00 EDT (UTC-04:00)	Dos Santos 43'	Report	Ellis-Hayden (yellow card) 17'; Schweitzer (yellow card) 25'; Carroll (yellow card) 90+2'	Stadium: TD Place Stadium; Attendance: 7,551; Referee: David Barrie

24 June 2017 14	Ottawa Fury	2 – 2	New York Red Bulls II	Ottawa
14:00 EDT (UTC-04:00)	Williams 10'; Dixon 90+4'	Report	Lewis 61'; Allen 62'	Stadium: TD Place Stadium; Attendance: 7,780; Referee: Alain Ruch

1 July 2017 15	Louisville City FC	2 – 1	Ottawa Fury	Louisville
19:30 EDT (UTC-04:00)	Ownby 14'; Ilić (yellow card) 31'; DelPiccolo (yellow card) 53'; Spencer 71'	Report	Dixon (yellow card) 39'; Barden (yellow card) 56'; Campbell (yellow card) 59'; Dos Santos 87', (yellow card) 90+4'	Stadium: Louisville Slugger Field; Attendance: 7,814; Referee: Henrik Karlsson

8 July 2017 16	Toronto FC II	1 – 0	Ottawa Fury	Vaughan, ON
19:30 EDT (UTC-04:00)	D. Campbell (yellow card) 36'; Uccello 73'; Andrews (yellow card) 90+2'	Report	Dixon (yellow card) 57'; A. Campbell (yellow card) 61' (yellow-red card) 90+5'	Stadium: Ontario Soccer Centre; Attendance: 1,007; Referee: David Barrie

15 July 2017 17	Ottawa Fury	1 – 1	Rochester Rhinos	Ottawa
14:00 EDT (UTC-04:00)	Barden (yellow card) 33'; Bruna (yellow card) 72'; Hume 89'	Report	Graf 15'; Garzi (yellow card) 39'	Stadium: TD Place Stadium; Attendance: 5,525; Referee: Chris Grabas

29 July 2017 18	Ottawa Fury	2 – 0	Toronto FC II	Ottawa
19:00 EDT (UTC-04:00)	Luboyera 24'; Seoane 75'	Report	Osorio (yellow card) 9'	Stadium: TD Place Stadium; Attendance: 6,763; Referee: Pierre-Luc Lauzière

5 August 2017 19	Ottawa Fury	1 – 2	Bethlehem Steel FC	Ottawa
19:00 EDT (UTC-04:00)	Trusty 7' (o.g.); Bruna (yellow card) 36'; Irving (yellow card) 52'; McEleney (yellow card) 84'	Report	Real (yellow card) 42'; Nanco 66'; Fontana (yellow card) 68'; Moar 81'; Trusty (yellow card) 90+6'	Stadium: TD Place Stadium; Attendance: 4,630; Referee: David Barrie

12 August 2017 20	Ottawa Fury	3 – 1	Charlotte Independence	Ottawa
19:00 EDT (UTC-04:00)	Rozeboom (yellow card) 5'; Edward 37'; Bruna 52'; Reid 87'	Report	Johnson (yellow card) 36'; Siaj (yellow card) 61'; Spies 75'	Stadium: TD Place Stadium; Attendance: 4,360; Referee: Carol Anne Chénard

16 August 2017 21	Orlando City B	3 – 0	Ottawa Fury	Orlando
19:00 EDT (UTC-04:00)	Hines 34'; Timbó (yellow card) 53'; Barry 60', 71'; Ellis-Hayden (yellow card) 80'	Report	Dos Santos (yellow card) 75'	Stadium: Orlando City Stadium; Referee: Henrik Karlsson

19 August 2017 22	Tampa Bay Rowdies	1 – 1	Ottawa Fury	St. Petersburg, FL
19:30 EDT (UTC-04:00)	Hristov 11'; Paterson (yellow card) 19'; Nanchoff (yellow card) 49'; Restrepo (yellow card) 90+3'	Report	Dos Santos 3'; Manesio (yellow card) 72'; Lefèvre (yellow card) 90+1'	Stadium: Al Lang Stadium; Attendance: 6,710; Referee: Jonathan Weiner

23 August 2017 23	FC Cincinnati	3 – 1	Ottawa Fury	Cincinnati
19:30 EDT (UTC-04:00)	König 34'; McLaughlin 42'; Polak (yellow card) 52' de Wit 57'	Report	Manesio (yellow card) 24'; Dos Santos (yellow card) 48', (goal) 63'; Barden (yellow card) 50'	Stadium: Nippert Stadium; Attendance: 20,058; Referee: Eric Tattersall

27 August 2017 24	Ottawa Fury	2 – 2	New York Red Bulls II	Ottawa
15:00 EDT (UTC-04:00)	Dos Santos 21'; Campbell (yellow card) 55'; Manesio (yellow card) 65'; Del Campo 90+4'	Report	Valot 32'; Scarlett (yellow card) 67'; Tinari 79'	Stadium: TD Place Stadium; Attendance: 6,694; Referee: Juan Márquez

3 September 2017 25	Ottawa Fury	2 – 2	Saint Louis FC	Ottawa
14:00 EDT (UTC-04:00)	Dos Santos (yellow card) 28', (goal) 88' (pen.); Del Campo (yellow card) 33'; Barden 38'	Report	Volesky (yellow card) 61'; Rudolph 65'; Petosevic 78'	Stadium: TD Place Stadium; Attendance: 4,059; Referee: Yusri Rudolf

9 September 2017 26	Rochester Rhinos	1 – 1	Ottawa Fury	Rochester
18:00 EDT (UTC-04:00)	François 19'	Report	McEleney (yellow card) 37'; Bruna (yellow card) 63' (yellow-red card) 88'; Dos Santos 71' (pen.)	Stadium: Capelli Sport Stadium; Attendance: 2,345; Referee: Calin Radosav

16 September 2017 27	Charlotte Independence	1 – 1	Ottawa Fury	Charlotte
19:00 EDT (UTC-04:00)	Smith (yellow card) 45'; Estrada (yellow card) 65'; Hilton 89'	Report	Dixon 11', (yellow card) 42'; Del Campo (yellow card) 36'; Dos Santos (yellow card) 38'; Edward (yellow card) 49'; Hume (yellow card) 68'	Stadium: Ramblewood Soccer Complex; Attendance: 1,830; Referee: Mark Kadlecik

24 September 2017 28	Ottawa Fury	1 – 1	Louisville City FC	Ottawa
14:00 EDT (UTC-04:00)	DePuy 68'; Bruna (yellow card) 82'	Report	Davis IV 56'	Stadium: TD Place Stadium; Attendance: 6,015; Referee: Pierre-Luc Lauzière

27 September 2017 29	Harrisburg City Islanders	1 – 0	Ottawa Fury	Harrisburg
18:00 EDT (UTC-04:00)	Benbow (red card) 40'; Mensah 46'; McLaws (yellow card) 51'; Wilson (yellow card) 56'; Grosh (yellow card) 90+1'	Report	Campbell (yellow card) 85'	Stadium: FNB Field; Attendance: 1,806; Referee: Calin Radosav

1 October 2017 30	Ottawa Fury	1 – 1	Charleston Battery	Ottawa
14:00 EDT (UTC-04:00)	Dos Santos 16'; Dixon (yellow card) 35'; DePuy (yellow card) 46'	Report	Hackshaw (yellow card) 28'; Lasso (yellow card) 40' (yellow-red card) 59'; Cordovés 85'	Stadium: TD Place Stadium; Attendance: 4,587; Referee: Chris Grabas

8 October 2017 31	Ottawa Fury	4 – 0	FC Cincinnati	Ottawa
14:00 EDT (UTC-04:00)	Obasi 4'; Haworth 13', 20'; Reid (yellow card) 24'; Dos Santos 47'; Venter (red card) 69'; Campbell (yellow card) 89'	Report	Fall (yellow card) 39'; Greig (yellow card) 70'	Stadium: TD Place Stadium; Attendance: 5,445; Referee: Yusri Rudolf

14 October 2017 32	Pittsburgh Riverhounds	1 – 1	Ottawa Fury	Pittsburgh
19:30 EDT (UTC-04:00)	Hertzog (yellow card) 19', (goal) 77' (pen.); Agbossoumonde (yellow card) 34'	Report	DePuy 9'	Stadium: Highmark Stadium; Attendance: 3,540; Referee: Matthew Rodman

=== Canadian Championship ===
==== Preliminary round ====
3 May 2017 1	Ottawa Fury	1 – 0	Edmonton	Ottawa
19:30 EST (UTC-05:00)	Edward (yellow card) 19'; Dos Santos (yellow card) 70'; Williams 89'	Report	Sansara (yellow card) 19'; Shiels (yellow card) 37'	Stadium: TD Place Stadium; Attendance: 2,567; Referee: Juan Márques

10 May 2017 2	Edmonton	2 – 3 (2 – 4 agg.)	Ottawa Fury	Edmonton
19:00 EST (UTC-05:00)	Keegan 30'; Zebie (yellow card) 52'; Nyassi 61'; Diakité (yellow card) 62' (red card) 67'; Ameobi (yellow card) 74'	Report	Seoane 1'; Dos Santos 37' (pen.), 90+4'; McEleney (yellow card) 87'	Stadium: Clarke Stadium; Attendance: 2,591; Referee: David Barrie

==== Semi-finals ====
23 May 2017 1	Ottawa Fury	2 – 1	Toronto FC	Ottawa
19:00 EST (UTC-05:00)	Williams 57' (pen.); Seoane 72', (yellow card) 78'	Report	Cheyrou 35'; Taintor (yellow card) 56'; Edwards (yellow card) 86' (yellow-red card) 90+2'	Stadium: TD Place Stadium; Attendance: 7,611; Referee: Pierre-Luc Lauzière

31 May 2017 2	Toronto FC	4 – 0 (5 – 2 agg.)	Ottawa Fury	Toronto
19:00 EST (UTC-05:00)	Edward 41' (o.g.); Endoh 42'; Delgado 80'; Giovinco 85'	Report		Stadium: BMO Field; Attendance: 15,175; Referee: Geoff Gamble

== Squad statistics ==
As of match played 14 October 2017

=== Appearances and goals ===
No.	Pos	Nat	Player	Total		USL		Canadian Championship	
No.	Pos	Nat	Player	Apps	Goals	Apps	Goals	Apps	Goals
1	GK	(Canada) CAN	Callum Irving	36	0	32	0	4	0
2	MF	(England) ENG	Jonathan Barden	29	1	20+7	1	0+2	0
3	DF	(Canada) CAN	Eddie Edward	27	2	21+2	2	4	0
4	DF	(Mexico) MEX	Ramon Martin Del Campo	28	2	23+1	2	4	0
5	DF	(United States) USA	Kyle Venter	17	0	15+2	0	0	0
6	DF	(Republic of Ireland) IRL	Shane McEleney	25	0	21	0	4	0
7	MF	(England) ENG	Ryan Williams	20	5	10+6	3	4	2
8	FW	(Cape Verde) CPV	Steevan Dos Santos	29	12	24+3	10	2	2
9	FW	(Canada) CAN	Carl Haworth	21	2	16+5	2	0	0
10	MF	(Argentina) ARG	Gerardo Bruna	27	1	23+3	1	0+1	0
11	FW	(United States) USA	Sito Seoane	32	7	17+11	5	4	2
12	DF	(Jamaica) JAM	Andrae Campbell	30	0	26	0	4	0
14	DF	(England) ENG	Onua Obasi	25	2	18+3	2	4	0
15	FW	(United States) USA	Nick DePuy	8	2	7+1	2	0	0
17	FW	(Uganda) UGA	Azake Luboyera	6	1	4+2	1	0	0
18	FW	(United States) USA	Tucker Hume	26	3	12+11	3	2+1	0
22	MF	(Canada) CAN	Jamar Dixon	32	2	21+7	2	4	0
24	MF	(Haiti) HAI	Jimmy-Shammar Sanon	13	1	1+8	1	0+4	0
25	MF	(United States) USA	Lance Rozeboom	25	1	19+2	1	4	0
26	DF	(Canada) CAN	Thomas Meilleur-Giguère	4	0	0+4	0	0	0
28	MF	(England) ENG	Sergio Manesio	21	0	9+8	0	0+4	0
30	DF	(Canada) CAN	Adonijah Reid	12	1	5+7	1	0	0
59	MF	(Canada) CAN	Aron Mkungilwa	4	0	3+1	0	0	0
Players who appeared for Ottawa but left during the season:
55	DF	(Canada) CAN	Wandrille Lefèvre	2	0	2	0	0	0
77	FW	(Belize) BLZ	Michael Salazar	4	2	4	2	0	0

=== Goal scorers ===
Rnk	Pos	No.	Nat	Name	USL	Canadian Championship	Total
1	FW	8	(Cape Verde)	Steevan Dos Santos	10	2	12
2	FW	11	(United States)	Sito Seoane	5	2	7
3	MF	7	(England)	Ryan Williams	3	2	5
4	FW	18	(United States)	Tucker Hume	3	0	3
5	DF	3	(Canada)	Eddie Edward	2	0	2
5	DF	4	(Mexico)	Ramon M. Del Campo	2	0	2
5	FW	9	(Canada)	Carl Haworth	2	0	2
5	DF	14	(England)	Onua Obasi	2	0	2
5	FW	15	(United States)	Nick DePuy	2	0	2
5	MF	22	(Canada)	Jamar Dixon	2	0	2
5	FW	77	(Belize)	Michael Salazar	2	0	2
12	MF	2	(England)	Jonathan Barden	1	0	1
12	MF	10	(Argentina)	Gerardo Bruna	1	0	1
12	FW	17	(Uganda)	Azake Luboyera	1	0	1
12	MF	24	(Haiti)	Jimmy-Shammar Sanon	1	0	1
12	MF	25	(United States)	Lance Rozeboom	1	0	1
12	FW	30	(Canada)	Adonijah Reid	1	0	1
Own goal					1	0	1
Total					42	6	48

=== Clean sheets ===
Rnk	No.	Player	USL	Canadian Championship	Total
1	1	(Canada) Callum Irving	7	1	8
Total			7	1	8

=== Disciplinary ===
Number	Nation	Position	Name	USL		Canadian Championship		Total	
Number	Nation	Position	Name	Yellow card	Red card	Yellow card	Red card	Yellow card	Red card
1	(Canada)	GK	Callum Irving	1	0	0	0	1	0
2	(England)	MF	Jonathan Barden	5	0	0	0	5	0
3	(Canada)	DF	Eddie Edward	2	0	1	0	3	0
4	(Mexico)	DF	Ramon Martin Del Campo	3	0	0	0	3	0
5	(United States)	DF	Kyle Venter	0	1	0	0	0	1
6	(Republic of Ireland)	DF	Shane McEleney	4	1	1	0	5	1
8	(Cape Verde)	FW	Steevan Dos Santos	5	0	1	0	6	0
10	(Argentina)	MF	Gerardo Bruna	4	1	0	0	4	1
11	(United States)	FW	Sito Seoane	0	0	1	0	1	0
12	(Jamaica)	DF	Andrae Campbell	8	2	0	0	8	2
14	(England)	DF	Onua Obasi	3	0	0	0	3	0
15	(United States)	FW	Nick DePuy	1	0	0	0	1	0
18	(United States)	FW	Tucker Hume	1	0	0	0	1	0
22	(Canada)	MF	Jamar Dixon	4	0	0	0	4	0
25	(United States)	MF	Lance Rozeboom	2	0	0	0	2	0
28	(England)	MF	Sergio Manesio	5	0	0	0	5	0
30	(Canada)	FW	Adonijah Reid	1	0	0	0	1	0
55	(Canada)	DF	Wandrille Lefèvre	1	0	0	0	1	0
77	(Belize)	FW	Michael Salazar	1	0	0	0	1	0
			TOTALS	51	5	4	0	55	5

== Awards ==
=== Player ===
No.	Player	Award	Month	Source
1	(Canada) Callum Irving	USL Save of the Week (Week 23)	August	
2	(England) Jonathan Barden	USL Goal of the Week (Week 24)	September	
23	(Canada) Andrew MacRae	Ottawa Fury Community Award	November	
1	(Canada) Callum Irving	Ottawa Fury Fans' Player of the Year	November	
8	(Cape Verde) Steevan Dos Santos	Ottawa Fury Top Scorer	November	
1	(Canada) Callum Irving	Ottawa Fury Newcomers of the Year	November	
28	(England) Sergio Manesio	Ottawa Fury Newcomers of the Year	November	
22	(Canada) Jamar Dixon	Ottawa Fury Player of the Year	November	
