= 2018 Ottawa Fury FC season =

Ottawa Fury FC
2018 season
- President: John Pugh
- Head Coach: Nikola Popovic
- Stadium: TD Place Stadium
- USL: 10th, East
- Canadian Championship: Semifinals
- Top goalscorer: League: Three players (4); All: Tony Taylor (5)
- Highest home attendance: 8,084 (2 May v. New York Red Bulls II)
- Lowest home attendance: 2,781 (25 May v. Bethlehem Steel)
- Average home league attendance: 4,618
Home colours	Away colours

The 2018 Ottawa Fury FC season was the club's 5th season at the professional level and its 2nd in the United Soccer League.

== Squad ==
As of 21 September 2018

No.	Name	Nationality	Position	Date of birth (age)	Signed from	Signed in	Apps.	Goals
Goalkeepers
1	Callum Irving	(Canada)	GK	16 March 1993 (age 33)	(United States) Rio Grande Valley Toros	2017	38	0
12	David Monsalve	(Canada) (Colombia)	GK	21 December 1988 (age 37)	Vaughan Azzurri	2018	0	0
16	Maxime Crépeau	(Canada)	GK	11 April 1994 (age 32)	loan from Montreal Impact	2018	27	0
Defenders
3	Eddie Edward	(Canada)	RB/CB	20 September 1988 (age 38)	FC Edmonton	2016	71	2
4	Nana Attakora	(Canada) (Ghana)	RB/CB	27 March 1989 (age 37)	(United States) San Francisco Deltas	2018	17	2
7	Onua Obasi	(England) (United States)	LB/CB	24 September 1988 (age 38)	(United States) Rochester Rhinos	2016	66	2
13	Monti Mohsen	(Canada) (Iraq)	LB	13 June 2000 (age 26)	Ottawa Internationals	2018	1	0
20	David Edgar	(Canada) (England)	CB	19 May 1987 (age 39)	(United States) Nashville SC	2018	1	0
23	Daniel Kinumbe	(Canada)	FB	15 March 1999 (age 27)	Montreal Impact	2018	3	0
26	Thomas Meilleur-Giguère	(Canada)	CB	13 November 1997 (age 28)	loan from Montreal Impact	2018	27	0
31	Clément Bayiha	(Canada) (Cameroon)	FB	8 March 1999 (age 27)	Montreal Impact	2018	0	0
Midfielders
2	Jérémy Gagnon-Laparé	(Canada)	CM/LB	9 March 1995 (age 31)	(France) Vitré	2018	4	0
5	Chris Mannella	(Canada)	CM	7 June 1994 (age 32)	Vaughan Azzurri	2018	25	0
6	Sergio Manesio	(Angola) (England)	CM/CB	1 July 1994 (age 32)	Unattached	2017	33	0
15	Maxim Tissot	(Canada)	LB/LW	13 April 1992 (age 34)	(United States) San Francisco Deltas	2018	23	2
22	Jamar Dixon	(Canada) (Jamaica)	CM/RB	5 June 1989 (age 37)	(Finland) FF Jaro	2016	73	2
80	Cristian Portilla	(Spain)	CM/AM	28 August 1988 (age 38)	(United States) San Francisco Deltas	2018	21	1
88	Kévin Oliveira	(Cape Verde)	CM	8 June 1996 (age 30)	(United States) Sporting Kansas City	2018	29	4
Forwards
8	Steevan Dos Santos	(Cape Verde)	CF	17 December 1989 (age 36)	(United States) Rochester Rhinos	2017	51	16
9	Carl Haworth	(Canada) (England)	FW	9 July 1989 (age 37)	Ottawa Fury (PDL)	2014	129	17
11	Daniel Haber	(Canada)	FW	20 May 1992 (age 34)	(United States) FC Cincinnati	2018	7	0
14	Gabriel Wiethaeuper-Balbinotti	(Canada) (Brazil)	FW	12 April 1998 (age 28)	Montreal Impact	2018	2	0
17	Azake Luboyera	(Uganda)	FW	6 April 1998 (age 28)	Unattached	2017	10	1
24	Jimmy-Shammar Sanon	(Haiti) (Canada)	LW	24 January 1997 (age 29)	FC Montreal	2017	26	1
30	Adonijah Reid	(Canada) (Jamaica)	FW	13 August 1999 (age 27)	loan from (United States) FC Dallas	2018	37	4
99	Tony Taylor	(Panama) (United States)	FW	13 July 1989 (age 37)	(United States) Jacksonville Armada	2018	28	5

== Transfers ==
=== In ===
Date	Position	Nationality	Name	From	Fee
10 January 2018	DF	(Canada)	Nana Attakora	(United States) San Francisco Deltas	Free
10 January 2018	DF	(Canada)	Maxim Tissot	(United States) San Francisco Deltas	Free
18 January 2018	MF	(Cape Verde)	Kévin Oliveira	(United States) Sporting Kansas City	Free
21 January 2018	GK	(Canada)	Maxime Crépeau	Montreal Impact	Loan
23 January 2018	DF	(Republic of Ireland)	Colin Falvey	(United States) Indy Eleven	Free
8 February 2018	DF	(Canada)	Kyle Porter	(United States) Tampa Bay Rowdies	Free
8 February 2018	MF	(Spain)	Cristian Portilla	(United States) San Francisco Deltas	Free
12 February 2018	GK	(Canada)	David Monsalve	Vaughan Azzurri	Free
26 February 2018	FW	(Panama)	Tony Taylor	(United States) Jacksonville Armada	Free
28 February 2018	DF	(Canada)	Thomas Meilleur-Giguère	Montreal Impact	Loan
28 February 2018	FW	(Belize)	Michael Salazar	Montreal Impact	Loan
28 February 2018	FW	(Canada)	Gabriel Wiethaeuper-Balbinotti	Montreal Impact	Free
9 March 2018	FW	(Canada)	Adonijah Reid	(United States) FC Dallas	Loan
16 March 2018	MF	(Canada)	Chris Mannella	Vaughan Azzurri	Free
16 March 2018	DF	(Canada)	Monti Mohsen	Ottawa Internationals	Free
20 March 2018	MF	(Canada)	Shamit Shome	Montreal Impact	Loan
25 April 2018	DF	(Canada)	Doneil Henry	Vancouver Whitecaps FC	Loan
9 July 2018	FW	(Canada)	Daniel Haber	(United States) FC Cincinnati	Free
24 July 2018	DF	(Canada)	Clément Bayiha	Montreal Impact	Free
6 August 2018	DF	(Canada)	Daniel Kinumbe	Montreal Impact	Free
8 August 2018	DF	(Canada)	David Edgar	(United States) Nashville SC	Free

=== Out ===
Date	Position	Nationality	Name	To	Fee
13 November 2017	DF	(Jamaica)	Andrae Campbell	Unattached	Free
13 November 2017	DF	(Canada)	Aron Mkungilwa	Unattached	Free
13 November 2017	DF	(Canada)	Thomas Meilleur-Giguère	Montreal Impact	Free
14 December 2017	FW	(United States)	Tucker Hume	(United States) Nashville SC	Free
18 December 2017	MF	(England)	Jonathan Barden	(United States) Saint Louis FC	Free
6 January 2018	DF	(Republic of Ireland)	Shane McEleney	(Northern Ireland) Larne	Free
8 January 2018	MF	(United States)	Lance Rozeboom	(United States) Tampa Bay Rowdies	Free
24 January 2018	DF	(Mexico)	Ramon Martin Del Campo	(United States) Fresno FC	Free
3 February 2018	MF	(England)	Ryan Williams	(Brazil) Paysandu	Free
27 February 2018	DF	(United States)	Kyle Venter	(United States) Penn FC	Free
1 April 2018	GK	(Canada)	David Paulmin	(Norway) Kvik Halden	Free
7 April 2018	GK	(Canada)	Andrew MacRae	(Northern Ireland) Larne	Free
15 May 2018	FW	(United States)	Sito Seoane	(Iceland) Grindavík	Free
29 May 2018	DF	(Canada)	Doneil Henry	Vancouver Whitecaps FC	Loan end
13 July 2018	DF	(Canada)	Kyle Porter	(United States) Tampa Bay Rowdies	Free
24 July 2018	DF	(Canada)	Clément Bayiha	Montreal Impact	Loan
9 August 2018	MF	(Argentina)	Gerardo Bruna	Unattached	Free
28 August 2018	DF	(Republic of Ireland)	Colin Falvey	Unattached	Free

=== Trial ===
Date From	Date To	Position	Nationality	Name	Last club	Signed?
29 January 2018	2 February 2018	GK	(Canada)	Quillan Roberts	Woodbridge Strikers	No
29 January 2018	8 February 2018	DF	(Canada)	Kyle Porter	(United States) Tampa Bay Rowdies	Yes
29 January 2018	8 February 2018	MF	(Spain)	Cristian Portilla	(United States) San Francisco Deltas	Yes
29 January 2018	12 February 2018	GK	(Canada)	David Monsalve	Vaughan Azzurri	Yes
29 January 2018	16 March 2018	MF	(Canada)	Chris Mannella	Vaughan Azzurri	Yes
29 January 2018	16 March 2018	DF	(Canada)	Monti Mohsen	Ottawa Internationals	Yes
29 January 2018	Unknown	MF	(Canada)	A. J. Gray	(United States) Phoenix Rising	No
29 January 2018	Unknown	MF	(Canada)	Nevello Yoseke	(Sweden) Oskarshamn	No
29 January 2018	Unknown	MF	(Canada)	Hansly Felix-Malonga	(United States) D.C. United U-23	No
29 January 2018	Unknown		(Canada)	Jadon Vilfort	Gloucester Celtic	No
29 January 2018	Unknown	FW	(Canada)	Marcello Tantalo	Unattached	No
29 January 2018	Unknown	MF	(Serbia)	Dragomir Vukobratović	(Poland) Górnik Łęczna	No

== Friendlies ==
=== Pre-season ===
10 February 2018	Ottawa Fury	–	Gloucester Celtic	Ottawa, ON
				Attendance: Closed-door
Note: Match result not made public.

16 February 2018	Ottawa Fury	–	Ottawa Internationals	Ottawa, ON
				Attendance: Closed-door
Note: Match result not made public.

23 February 2018	Nashville SC	1–1	Ottawa Fury	Bradenton, FL
15:00 EST (UTC–5)	Winn 2' (pen.)	Report	Haworth 4'	Stadium: IMG Academy

27 February 2018	Carleton University	–	Ottawa Fury	Ottawa, ON
		Report		Stadium: MNP Park; Attendance: Closed-door
Note: Match result not made public.

4 March 2018	Toronto FC II	0–1	Ottawa Fury	Toronto, ON
16:30 EST (UTC–5)		Report	Haworth 75'	Stadium: BMO Field

9 March 2018	League1 Ontario All-Stars	1–6	Ottawa Fury	Vaughan, ON
12:45 EST (UTC–5)	Watson 4'	Report	Haworth 10', 15'; Sito 33'; Dos Santos 45+'; Reid 47'; Salazar 77'	Stadium: Ontario Soccer Centre

=== Mid-season ===
7 September 2018 Cap City Cup	Ottawa Fury	–	Montreal Impact	Ottawa, ON
19:00 EST (UTC–5)				Stadium: TD Place Stadium

=== Friendly statistics ===
Rnk	Pos	Nat	Name	Goals	Assists
1	FW	(Canada)	Carl Haworth	4	1
2	FW	(Cape Verde)	Steevan Dos Santos	1	2
3	FW	(United States)	Sito Seoane	1	1
4	FW	(Canada)	Adonijah Reid	1	0
4	FW	(Belize)	Michael Salazar	1	0
6	MF	(Angola)	Sergio Manesio	0	1
Total				8	5

== Competitions ==
=== United Soccer League ===
==== Standings ====
Pos	Team	Pld	W	D	L	GF	GA	GD	Pts	Qualification
8	Nashville SC	34	12	13	9	42	31	+11	49	Conference Playoffs
9	North Carolina FC	34	13	8	13	60	50	+10	47	
10	Ottawa Fury	34	13	6	15	31	43	−12	45	
11	Charlotte Independence	34	10	12	12	44	57	−13	42	
12	Tampa Bay Rowdies	34	11	8	15	44	44	0	41	

Source: 2018 USL standings
Rules for classification: 1) total wins; 2) total goal differential; 3) total goals scored; 4) points earned against top four Conference finishers; 5) disciplinary points; 6) coin toss or drawing of lots

==== Results summary ====
Overall								Home						Away					
Pld	W	D	L	GF	GA	GD	Pts	W	D	L	GF	GA	GD	W	D	L	GF	GA	GD
27	10	5	12	24	33	−9	35	7	3	5	15	12	+3	3	2	7	9	21	−12

Last updated: 18 August 2018.
Source: Match reports

==== Results by round ====
Round	1	2	3	4	5	6	7	8	9	10	11	12	13	14	15	16	17	18	19	20	21	22	23	24	25	26	27	28	29	30	31	32	33	34
Ground	A	A	A	H	H	H	A	H	A	H	H	H	A	A	A	A	H	H	H	H	H	A	A	H	H	A	H	A	A	A	A	A	H	H
Result	L	L	L	D	L	D	W	W	D	W	W	L	L	W	L	W	L	W	W	L	W	D	L	W	D	L	L	L	W	W	L	W	D	L
Position	16	16	16	16	16	16	15	14	14	11	10	11	12	12	13	12	12	10	8	9	8	7	9	7	8	8	9	9	8	7	8	7	7	10

Updated to match(es) played on October 13, 2018. Source: Match reports
A = Away; H = Home; W = Win; D = Draw; L = Loss

==== Match reports ====
17 March 2018 1	Charlotte Independence	4–1	Ottawa Fury	Matthews, NC
19:00 EST (UTC–5)	Cato 41', 58'; George (yellow card) 45'; Herrera (yellow card) 67', (goal) 80' (pen.); Porter 83' (o.g.)	Report	Sito 64'; Oliveira (yellow card) 90+3'	Stadium: Sportsplex at Matthews; Attendance: 1,438; Referee: Jonathan Bilinski

7 April 2018 2	Tampa Bay Rowdies	5–0	Ottawa Fury	St. Petersburg, FL
19:30 EST (UTC–5)	Hristov 61'; Mannella 71' (o.g.); Fernandes 79'; Schäfer (yellow card) 81'; Cole 87'; Portillos 90+5'	Report	Dixon (yellow card) 11'; Obasi (red card) 90+1'; Mannella (yellow card) 90+3'	Stadium: Al Lang Stadium; Attendance: 5,059; Referee: Luis Guardia

14 April 2018 3	Pittsburgh Riverhounds	1–0	Ottawa Fury	Pittsburgh, PA
19:00 EST (UTC–5)	Zemanski (yellow card) 75'; Adewole 85'; Pratzner (yellow card) 90+2'	Report	Bruna (yellow card) 57'; Portilla (yellow card) 75'; Edward (yellow card) 90+4'	Stadium: Highmark Stadium; Attendance: 1,823; Referee: Lorant Varga

21 April 2018 4	Ottawa Fury	1–1	North Carolina FC	Ottawa, ON
14:00 EST (UTC–5)	Bruna (yellow card) 70'; Portilla 86'	Report	Ríos 35'	Stadium: TD Place Stadium; Attendance: 6,137; Referee: Pierre-Luc Lauzière

28 April 2018 5	Ottawa Fury	0–3	FC Cincinnati	Ottawa, ON
14:00 EST (UTC–5)	Reid (yellow card) 63'	Report	Lasso (yellow card) 50'; Ledesma (yellow card) 56', (goal) 77'; Smith (yellow card) 57'; Walker 68'; Bone 69'	Stadium: TD Place Stadium; Attendance: 2,785; Referee: Carol-Anne Chénard

2 May 2018 6	Ottawa Fury	0–0	New York Red Bulls II	Ottawa, ON
10:30 EST (UTC–5)	Reid (yellow card) 24'; Edward (yellow card) 54'; Mannella (red card) 66'; Haworth (yellow card) 90+1'	Report	Mines (yellow card) 83'	Stadium: TD Place Stadium; Attendance: 8,084; Referee: Matt Souare

7 May 2018 7	Penn FC	0–1	Ottawa Fury	Harrisburg, PA
18:30 EST (UTC–5)	Calvano (yellow card) 61'; Franco (yellow card) 80'	Report	Edward (yellow card) 83'; Falvey 87'	Stadium: FNB Field; Referee: Matthew Franz

12 May 2018 8	Ottawa Fury	2–0	Atlanta United 2	Ottawa, ON
14:00 EST (UTC–5)	Dos Santos 26'; Haworth 35'; Dixon (yellow card) 63'; Taylor (yellow card) 82'	Report	Cochran (yellow card) 10'; Edwards (yellow card) 34'; Shannon (yellow card) 53'	Stadium: TD Place Stadium; Attendance: 4,296; Referee: Yusri Rudolf

19 May 2018 9	Charleston Battery	0–0	Ottawa Fury	Charleston, SC
19:00 EST (UTC–5)	Higashi (yellow card) 45+1'; Thomas (yellow card) 48'; Rittmeyer (yellow card) 67'; Mueller (yellow card) 73'	Report	Edward (yellow card) 28'; Oliveira (yellow card) 34'	Stadium: MUSC Health Stadium; Attendance: 2,597; Referee: Kevin Broadley

25 May 2018 10	Ottawa Fury	1–0	Bethlehem Steel	Ottawa, ON
19:00 EST (UTC–5)	Oliveira 1'; Attakora (yellow card) 30'	Report	Moar (yellow card) 43'	Stadium: TD Place Stadium; Attendance: 2,781; Referee: Pierre-Luc Lauzière

30 May 2018 11	Ottawa Fury	3–0	Toronto FC II	Ottawa, ON
19:00 EST (UTC–5)	Dos Santos 16' (pen.), 79'; Attakora 48'	Report	Romeo (yellow card) 59'; Boskovic (yellow card) 80'	Stadium: TD Place Stadium; Attendance: 3,219; Referee: David Barrie

2 June 2018 12	Ottawa Fury	0–1	Charlotte Independence	Ottawa, ON
19:00 EST (UTC–5)	Reid (yellow card) 55'; Edward (yellow card) 90'	Report	Ekra 83'	Stadium: TD Place Stadium; Attendance: 5,693; Referee: Carol Anne Chenard

13 June 2018 13	North Carolina FC	4–2	Ottawa Fury	Cary, NC
19:00 EST (UTC–5)	Tobin 3', (yellow card) 46'; Ríos 30'; Lomis 43'; Miller 57'; Smith (yellow card) 69'; Bekker (yellow card) 87'	Report	Oliveira 45+2'; Attakora (yellow card) 53'; D. Taylor 74' (o.g.); Obasi (yellow card) 79'	Stadium: Sahlen's Stadium at WakeMed Soccer Park; Attendance: 3,452; Referee: Guido Gonzalez Jr.

24 June 2018 14	New York Red Bulls II	0–3	Ottawa Fury	Montclair, NJ
17:00 EST (UTC–5)		Report	Reid 3', 57', 64'; Edward (yellow card) 41'; Taylor (yellow card) 62'; Mannella (yellow card) 90+4'	Stadium: MSU Soccer Park; Attendance: 818; Referee: Bardhyl Pashaj

30 June 2018 15	FC Cincinnati	2–0	Ottawa Fury	Cincinnati, OH
19:30 EST (UTC–5)	König 16'; Smith (yellow card) 86'; Albadawi 90+2'	Report	Oliveira (yellow card) 71'	Stadium: Nippert Stadium; Attendance: 27,107; Referee: Daniel Gutierrez

4 July 2018 16	Indy Eleven	0–1	Ottawa Fury	Indianapolis, IN
19:00 EST (UTC–5)	Guerra (yellow card) 26'	Report	Haworth (yellow card) 9'; Reid (yellow card) 20'; Mitchell 28' (o.g.); Edward (yellow card) 69'; Obasi (yellow card) 79'	Stadium: Lucas Oil Stadium; Attendance: 11,025; Referee: Kevin Broadley

8 July 2018 17	Ottawa Fury	0–1	Pittsburgh Riverhounds	Ottawa, ON
13:00 EST (UTC–5)		Report	Roberts 22'	Stadium: TD Place Stadium; Attendance: 4,826; Referee: Yusri Rudolf

14 July 2018 18	Ottawa Fury	2–1	Penn FC	Ottawa, ON
14:00 EST (UTC–5)	Oliveira (yellow card) 64'; Taylor 72', (yellow card) 87'; Dos Santos 81'	Report	Tribbett (yellow card) 40', (goal) 56'	Stadium: TD Place Stadium; Attendance: 5,315; Referee: David Barrie

21 July 2018 19	Ottawa Fury	2–0	Nashville SC	Ottawa, ON
	Taylor 90+1'; Oliveira 90+6'	Report	LaGrassa (yellow card) 57'; Woodberry (yellow card) 64' (yellow-red card) 90+4'	Stadium: TD Place Stadium; Attendance: 4,264; Referee: Juan Marquez

28 July 2018 20	Ottawa Fury	0–3	Louisville City	Ottawa, ON
	Obasi (yellow card) 58'; Taylor (yellow card) 83'	Report	DelPiccolo 13'; Craig 47'; Williams 57'; Souahy (red card) 77'; Ranjitsingh (yellow card) 79'	Stadium: TD Place Stadium; Attendance: 4,096; Referee: Fabrizio Stasolla

3 August 2018 21	Ottawa Fury	2–0	Tampa Bay Rowdies	Ottawa, ON
19:00 EDT (UTC−4)	Taylor 1'; Reid (yellow card) 45+1'; Attakora 53'	Report	Gorskie (yellow card) 79'; Diakité (yellow card) 83'	Stadium: TD Place Stadium; Attendance: 4,226; Referee: David Barrie

16 June / 7 August 2018 22	Atlanta United 2	1–1	Ottawa Fury	Lawrenceville, GA / Kennesaw, GA
19:00 / 18:00 EST (UTC–5)	Edward 3' (o.g.)	Report	Oliveira 10'	Stadium: Coolray Field / Fifth Third Bank Stadium; Attendance: 3,596; Referee: Eric Tattersall / Aleksandar Zhelyaskov
Note: Match began on 16 June at Coolray Field and was abandoned in the 44th minute with the score tied 1–1 due to lightning. The match was resumed in the 44th minute and with the same score on 7 August at Fifth Third Bank Stadium.

10 August 2018 23	Nashville SC	2–0	Ottawa Fury	Nashville, TN
	LaGrassa 31', (yellow card) 65'; Allen 59' (pen.)	Report		Stadium: First Tennessee Park; Attendance: 8,694; Referee: Elvis Osmanovic

15 August 2018 24	Ottawa Fury	2–0	Richmond Kickers	Ottawa, ON
19:00 EST (UTC–5)	Haworth 8'; Portilla (yellow card) 41'; Taylor 84'	Report		Stadium: TD Place Stadium; Attendance: 3,535; Referee: Matt Souare

18 August 2018 25	Ottawa Fury	0–0	Indy Eleven	Ottawa, ON
14:00 EDT (UTC–5)		Report	Ayoze (yellow card) 85'	Stadium: TD Place Stadium; Attendance: 5,393; Referee: Yusri Rudolf

22 August 2018 26	Bethlehem Steel	2–0	Ottawa Fury	Bethlehem, PA
5:00 PM	Moar 16', 32' (pen.), (yellow card) 72'; Skundrich (yellow card) 41'; Yaro (yellow card) 84'; Aubrey (yellow card) 90+2'	Report	Meilleur-Giguere (yellow card) 31'; Taylor (yellow card) 49'; Portilla (yellow card) 58'; Haworth (yellow card) 88'	Stadium: Goodman Stadium; Attendance: 2,066; Referee: Jon Freemon

25 August 2018 27	Ottawa Fury	0–2	Penn FC	Ottawa, ON
8:00 PM	Attakora (yellow card) 76'	Report	Bond (yellow card) 20'; Paulo 45'; Dennis (yellow card) 72', (goal) 80'	Stadium: TD Place Stadium; Attendance: 5,270; Referee: Pierre-Luc Lauziere

31 August 2018 28	New York Red Bulls II	1–0	Ottawa Fury	Montclair, NJ
7:00 PM EDT	Stroud 9'	Report	Portilla (yellow card) 52'; Edward (red card) 54'	Stadium: MSU Soccer Park; Referee: Daniel Gutierrez

6 September 2018 29	Toronto FC II	3–4	Ottawa Fury	Toronto, ON
	Hernandez (yellow card) 39'; Endoh 47'; Bakero 47'; Srbely (yellow card) 56'; Hamilton (pen.), 74'; Hagglund (yellow card) 83'	Report	Taylor 4'; Portilla 37'; Meilleur-Giguère 69'; Reid 78'; Monsalve (yellow card) 90+4'	Stadium: Lamport Stadium; Attendance: 207; Referee: David Barrie

15 September 2018 30	Richmond Kickers	0–2	Ottawa Fury	Richmond, VA
19:00 EDT	Roberts (yellow card) 83'	Report	Roberts 10' (o.g.); Haworth 38'	Stadium: City Stadium; Attendance: 2,369; Referee: Thomas Snyder

22 September 2018 31	Louisville City	4–0	Ottawa Fury	Louisville, KY
7:30PM	Davis IV (yellow card) 39', (goal) 45+1'; Lancaster 45+4', 83'; Souahy 78'	Report	Attakora (red card) 39'; Oliveira (red card) 58'	Stadium: Louisville Slugger Field; Attendance: 7,729; Referee: Matt Franz

26 September 2018 32	Toronto FC II	0–1	Ottawa Fury	Toronto, ON
5:00 P.M.	Campbell (yellow card) 16'; Mohammed (yellow card) 55'	Report	Mannella (yellow card) 16'; Taylor (yellow card) 19'; Reid (yellow card) 31'; Dos Santos 32' (pen.); Sanon (yellow card) 90+3'	Stadium: Lamport Stadium; Attendance: 107; Referee: Yusri Rudolf
Note: Match originally scheduled for March 31, but was postponed due to poor pitch conditions.

30 September 2018 33	Ottawa Fury	0–0	Bethlehem Steel	Ottawa, ON
	Edward (yellow card) 75'	Report	Mbaizo (yellow card) 4'; Moar (yellow card) 39'; Ofeimu (yellow card) 59'	Stadium: TD Place Stadium; Attendance: 5,470; Referee: Fabrizio Stasolla

13 October 2018 34	Ottawa Fury	0–2	Charleston Battery	Ottawa, ON
1:00 P.M.		Report	Wild 14'; Svantesson 60', (yellow card) 84'	Stadium: TD Place Stadium; Attendance: 5,385; Referee: Yusri Rudolf

=== Canadian Championship ===
==== Second qualifying round ====
20 June 2018 1	Blainville	0–1	Ottawa Fury	Laval, QC
19:30 (UTC-05:00)	Moulinas (yellow card) 76'	Report	Taylor 1'; Dixon (yellow card) 40'	Stadium: Stade Desjardins; Attendance: 1,800; Referee: Alain Ruch

27 June 2018 2	Ottawa Fury	1–0 (2–0 agg.)	Blainville	Ottawa, ON
19:30 (UTC-05:00)	Haworth 21'; Obasi (yellow card) 62'	Report	Mayard (yellow card) 85'	Stadium: TD Place Stadium; Attendance: 3,915; Referee: Juan Marquez

==== Semi-finals ====
18 July 2018 1	Ottawa Fury	0–1	Toronto FC	Ottawa, ON
19:30 (UTC-05:00)	Obasi (yellow card) 22'	Report	Osorio 5'; Johnson (yellow card) 15'; Fraser (yellow card) 48'	Stadium: TD Place Stadium; Attendance: 6,057; Referee: Silviu Petrescu

25 July 2018 2	Toronto FC	3–0 (4–0 agg.)	Ottawa Fury	Toronto, ON
19:30 (UTC-05:00)	Akinola 36'; Hamilton 76'; Osorio 84'	Report	Taylor (yellow card) 32'; Oliveira (yellow card) 78'	Stadium: BMO Field; Attendance: 18,795; Referee: Pierre-Luc Lauzière

== Squad statistics ==
As of match played 18 August 2018

=== Appearances and goals ===
No.	Pos	Nat	Player	Total		USL		Canadian Championship	
No.	Pos	Nat	Player	Apps	Goals	Apps	Goals	Apps	Goals
1	GK	(Canada) CAN	Callum Irving	2	0	2	0	0	0
2	MF	(Canada) CAN	Jérémy Gagnon-Laparé	3	0	1+1	0	1	0
3	DF	(Canada) CAN	Eddie Edward	25	0	21	0	4	0
4	DF	(Canada) CAN	Nana Attakora	17	2	13	2	4	0
5	MF	(Canada) CAN	Chris Mannella	25	0	15+6	0	3+1	0
6	MF	(Angola) ANG	Sergio Manesio	12	0	5+6	0	0+1	0
7	DF	(England) ENG	Onua Obasi	22	0	19	0	3	0
8	FW	(Cape Verde) CPV	Steevan Dos Santos	22	4	16+4	4	2	0
9	FW	(Canada) CAN	Carl Haworth	23	3	17+4	2	2	1
11	FW	(Canada) CAN	Daniel Haber	9	0	3+4	0	1+1	0
13	DF	(Canada) CAN	Monti Mohsen	1	0	1	0	0	0
14	FW	(Canada) CAN	Gabriel Wiethaeuper-Balbinotti	2	0	0+2	0	0	0
15	MF	(Canada) CAN	Maxim Tissot	4	0	0+2	0	0+2	0
16	GK	(Canada) CAN	Maxime Crépeau	27	0	23	0	4	0
17	FW	(Uganda) UGA	Azake Luboyera	4	0	0+2	0	0+2	0
20	DF	(Canada) CAN	David Edgar	1	0	1	0	0	0
22	MF	(Canada) CAN	Jamar Dixon	29	0	22+3	0	4	0
23	DF	(Canada) CAN	Daniel Kinumbe	3	0	2+1	0	0	0
24	FW	(Haiti) HAI	Jimmy-Shammar Sanon	13	0	0+11	0	0+2	0
26	DF	(Canada) CAN	Thomas Meilleur-Giguère	23	0	18+1	0	4	0
30	FW	(Canada) CAN	Adonijah Reid	25	3	17+4	3	3+1	0
32	DF	(Republic of Ireland) IRL	Colin Falvey	12	1	12	1	0	0
80	MF	(Spain) ESP	Cristian Portilla	21	1	14+5	1	1+1	0
88	MF	(Cape Verde) CPV	Kévin Oliveira	29	4	24+1	4	4	0
99	FW	(Panama) PAN	Tony Taylor	28	5	17+7	4	4	1
Players who appeared for Ottawa but left during the season:
10	MF	(Argentina) ARG	Gerardo Bruna	5	0	5	0	0	0
11	FW	(United States) USA	Sito Seoane	3	1	0+3	1	0	0
37	FW	(Belize) BLZ	Michael Salazar	4	0	3+1	0	0	0
90	DF	(Canada) CAN	Kyle Porter	3	0	2+1	0	0	0
93	DF	(Canada) CAN	Doneil Henry	3	0	3	0	0	0

=== Goal scorers ===
Rnk	Pos	No.	Nat	Player	USL	Canadian Championship	Total
1	FW	99	(Panama)	Tony Taylor	4	1	5
2	FW	8	(Cape Verde)	Steevan Dos Santos	4	0	4
2	MF	88	(Cape Verde)	Kévin Oliveira	4	0	4
4	FW	30	(Canada)	Adonijah Reid	3	0	3
4	FW	9	(Canada)	Carl Haworth	2	1	3
6	DF	4	(Canada)	Nana Attakora	2	0	2
7	FW	11	(United States)	Sito Seoane	1	0	1
7	DF	32	(Republic of Ireland)	Colin Falvey	1	0	1
7	MF	80	(Spain)	Cristian Portilla	1	0	1
Own goal					2	0	2
Total					23	2	25

=== Clean sheets ===
Rnk	No.	Player	USL	Canadian Championship	Total
1	16	(Canada) Maxime Crépeau	12	2	14
Total			12	2	14

=== Disciplinary ===
Number	Nation	Position	Name	USL		Canadian Championship		Total	
Number	Nation	Position	Name	Yellow card	Red card	Yellow card	Red card	Yellow card	Red card
3	(Canada)	DF	Eddie Edward	7	0	0	0	7	0
4	(Canada)	DF	Nana Attakora	2	0	0	0	2	0
5	(Canada)	MF	Chris Mannella	2	1	0	0	2	1
7	(England)	DF	Onua Obasi	3	1	2	0	5	1
9	(Canada)	FW	Carl Haworth	2	0	0	0	2	0
10	(Argentina)	MF	Gerardo Bruna	2	0	0	0	2	0
22	(Canada)	MF	Jamar Dixon	2	0	1	0	3	0
30	(Canada)	FW	Adonijah Reid	5	0	0	0	5	0
80	(Spain)	MF	Cristian Portilla	2	0	0	0	2	0
88	(Cape Verde)	MF	Kévin Oliveira	4	0	1	0	5	0
99	(Panama)	FW	Tony Taylor	4	0	1	0	5	0
			Totals	35	2	5	0	40	2
