= Jason Watson =

Jason Watson may refer to:

- Jason Watson (footballer) (born 1991), Jamaican footballer
- Jason Watson (jockey) (born 2000), English jockey
