= Carl Haworth =

Canadian soccer player (born 1989)

Personal information
- Date of birth: July 9, 1989 (age 37)
- Place of birth: Southport, England
- Height: 1.75 m (5 ft 9 in)
- Positions: Forward; right-back

Youth career
- 1993–2008: Barrie SC

College career
Years	Team	Apps	(Gls)
2008–2011	Niagara Purple Eagles	73	(35)

Senior career*
Years	Team	Apps	(Gls)
2009–2012	Forest City London	44	(23)
2012	Montreal Impact	0	(0)
2013	Ottawa Fury (PDL)	12	(12)
2014–2019	Ottawa Fury	159	(26)
2020–2021	Indy Eleven	15	(1)
2022–2023	Atlético Ottawa	40	(3)
Total		270	(65)

International career^{‡}
2012	Canada U23	3	(0)
2016	Canada	1	(0)
- * Club domestic league appearances and goals ‡ National team caps and goals as of November 11, 2016

Carl Haworth (born July 9, 1989) is a professional soccer player who played as a forward and right-back. Born in England, he played for the Canada national team.

== Club career ==
=== Early career ===
Haworth began playing soccer at the age of four with Barrie SC, where he would play all of his youth soccer.

Haworth spent his entire collegiate career at Niagara University where he made a total of 73 appearances for the Purple Eagles and tallied 35 goals and 21 assists. He was also named MAAC Rookie of the Year in 2008, and was on the MAAC All-Academic team in 2009, 2010 and 2011 as well as First team All-MAAC in 2010 and 2011.

=== Forest City London ===
During his time in college, Haworth also played for Forest City London in the USL Premier Development League. On January 17, 2012, Haworth was drafted in the fourth round of the 2012 MLS Supplemental Draft (58th overall) by Montreal Impact. Despite making appearances during preseason as well as two reserve league appearances, he never signed a contract with the club. After an unsuccessful trial with the Impact, Haworth rejoined Forest City London for the remainder of the 2012 season. He tallied five goals in seven appearances for FC London and led them to their first PDL title.

=== Ottawa Fury ===
Haworth would trial unsuccessfully with Harrisburg City Islanders near the end of the 2012 season. In 2013, Haworth joined Ottawa Fury for their final season in the PDL. He made 12 appearances and led the team with 12 goals and 12 assists. He was also named to the PDL All-Eastern Conference team.

On November 19, 2013, Haworth signed his first professional contract as he joined Ottawa Fury FC for their inaugural season in the NASL. He made his professional debut on April 12, 2014, in a 2–0 defeat to Fort Lauderdale Strikers.

After leading the team in scoring with 8 goals, Haworth was named the Fury's top player in the 2016 season. In November 2016, it was announced that Haworth would stay with the club as they moved to the United Soccer League for the 2017 season. Despite being injured for the first half of the 2017 season, he would appear playing in his 100th game for the club in September 2017. In November 2017, the Fury announced Haworth would remain with the club for the 2018 season. In November 2018, The Fury announced Haworth would return for a sixth season in 2019. After six seasons with the Fury, the club would cease operations for the 2020 season, making Haworth a free agent. He would be the only player to play for the club for its entire existence.

=== Indy Eleven ===
In December 2019, Haworth joined Indy Eleven ahead of the 2020 season. In November 2020, the club would confirm that Haworth would return for the 2021 season, his second with the club. In December 2021, the club announced that Haworth's contract had expired, ending his time with the club after two seasons.

=== Atlético Ottawa ===
In February 2022, Haworth returned to Canada and signed with Canadian Premier League side Atlético Ottawa. Ottawa won the regular season that year.

== International career ==
Haworth was a member of the Canadian under-23 national team for their Olympic Qualifying Tournament in 2012. He made three appearances for the U23s.

Haworth received his first call-up to the Canadian senior team on November 4, 2016, for a friendly against South Korea.

== Style of play ==
Haworth can play as a central forward or as a winger, a position he played regularly for the Fury under Marc Dos Santos, but has also appeared as a right-back. Anticipating a more central role after the arrival of Paul Dalglish, Haworth commented, "Growing up I always played centrally, it's something that comes naturally. For the wingers to be tucked in more and playing closer to goal, it definitely benefits me. I can make those runs in behind and have a little less of a defensive role, so I can save that energy for going forward".

== Personal life ==
Haworth was born in Southport, Merseyside to an English mother and a Welsh father. At the age of one, he and his family moved to Barrie, Ontario.

== Career statistics ==
As of match played October 7, 2023

Appearances and goals by club, season and competition
Club	Season	League			Playoffs		Domestic Cup		Total	
Club	Season	Division	Apps	Goals	Apps	Goals	Apps	Goals	Apps	Goals
FC London	2009	Premier Development League	14	1	1	0	—		15	1
FC London	2010	Premier Development League	14	8	1	0	—		15	8
FC London	2011	Premier Development League	13	11	1	0	—		14	11
FC London	2012	Premier Development League	3	3	4	2	—		7	5
FC London	Total		44	23	7	2	0	0	51	25
Ottawa Fury	2013	Premier Development League	12	12	0	0	—		12	12
Ottawa Fury	2014	NASL	24	2	0	0	2	0	26	2
Ottawa Fury	2015	NASL	25	2	1	0	2	0	28	2
Ottawa Fury	2016	NASL	27	7	0	0	4	1	31	8
Ottawa Fury	2017	USL	21	2	0	0	0	0	21	2
Ottawa Fury	2018	USL	30	3	0	0	2	1	32	4
Ottawa Fury	2019	USL Championship	32	10	1	0	4	0	37	10
Ottawa Fury	Total		159	26	2	0	14	2	175	28
Indy Eleven	2020	USL Championship	11	1	0	0	0	0	11	1
Indy Eleven	2021	USL Championship	4	0	0	0	0	0	4	0
Indy Eleven	Total		15	1	0	0	0	0	15	1
Atlético Ottawa	2022	Canadian Premier League	23	0	3	0	1	0	27	0
Atlético Ottawa	2023	Canadian Premier League	17	3	—		0	0	17	3
Atlético Ottawa	Total		40	3	3	0	1	0	44	3
Career total			270	65	12	2	15	2	295	69

== Honours ==
Forest City London

- USL PDL Champions: 2012

Atlético Ottawa

- Canadian Premier League
  - Regular Season: 2022
