= Thomas Meilleur-Giguère =

Canadian soccer player (born 1997)

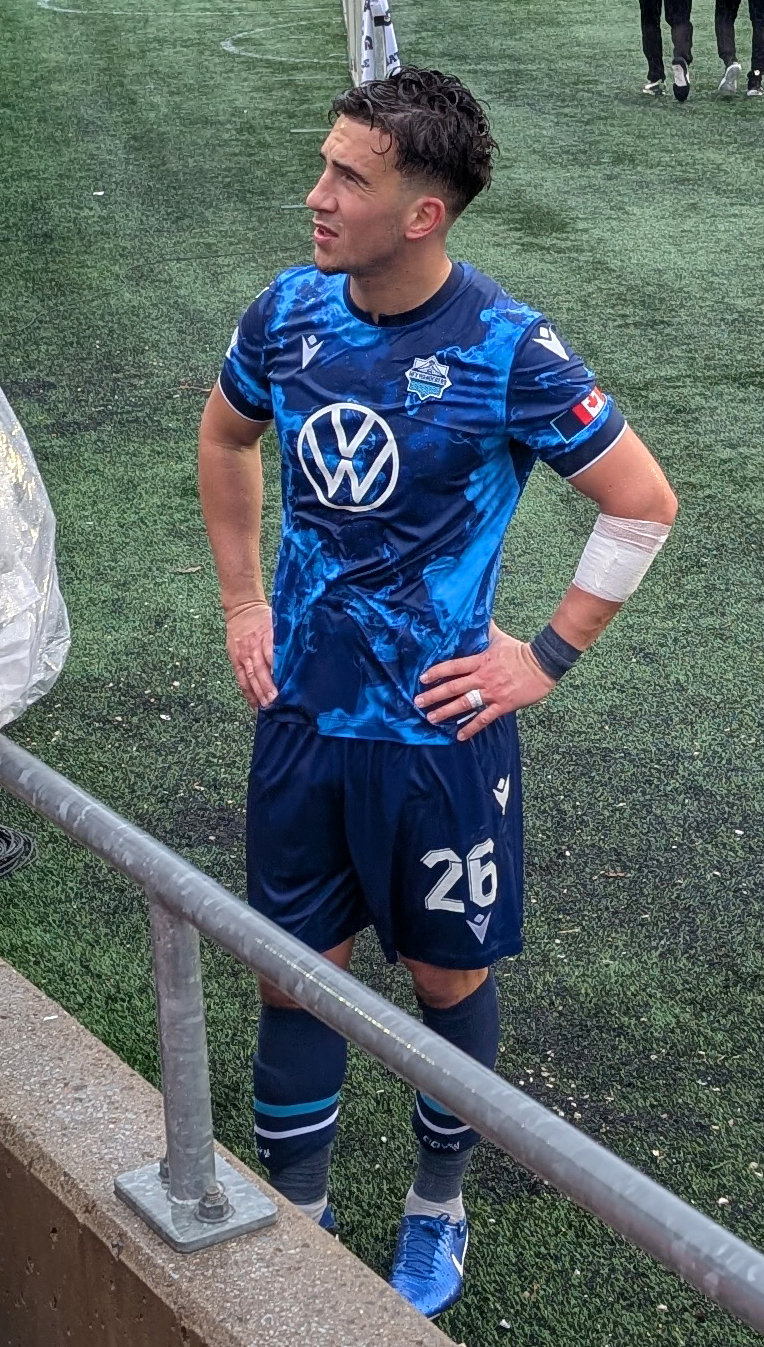
- Meilleur-Giguère with HFX Wanderers FC

Personal information
- Date of birth: November 13, 1997 (age 29)
- Place of birth: Repentigny, Quebec, Canada
- Height: 1.85 m (6 ft 1 in)
- Position: Centre-back

Team information
- Current team: HFX Wanderers
- Number: 26

Youth career
- L'Assomption
- 2013–2016: Montreal Impact

Senior career*
Years	Team	Apps	(Gls)
2016	FC Montreal	21	(2)
2017	Ottawa Fury	4	(0)
2018–2019	Montreal Impact	0	(0)
2018–2019	→ Ottawa Fury (loan)	57	(2)
2020–2024	Pacific FC	98	(7)
2025–	HFX Wanderers	28	(4)

International career^{‡}
2016–2017	Canada U20	12	(0)
- * Club domestic league appearances and goals as of October 27, 2025 ‡ National team caps and goals as of July 24, 2017

Thomas Meilleur-Giguère (born November 13, 1997), also known as TMG, is a Canadian professional soccer player who plays as a centre-back for HFX Wanderers.

== Club career ==
=== FC Montreal ===
Meilleur-Giguère was a member of the Montreal Impact Academy U18 side which finished the 2014/15 U.S. Soccer Development Academy in first place in the overall standings. In February 2016, he was one of four teammates who had a training stint with Bologna F.C. 1909 of Serie A. FC Montreal signed Meilleur-Giguère for their 2016 season in the USL and made his professional debut for the club on March 28 in a 2–0 defeat to Toronto FC II. He scored two goals in 21 matches for FC Montreal.

=== Ottawa Fury ===
In February 2017 Meilleur-Giguère signed with the Ottawa Fury, the Montreal Impact's new affiliate club. He played four matches for the club during the 2017 season. Meilleur-Giguère signed a first-team contract with Montreal Impact on November 13, 2017. However, on February 28, 2018 he was loaned back to the Ottawa Fury. On February 1, 2019, the Fury announced that Meilleur-Giguère would return on loan from the Impact for the 2019 season. Meilleur-Giguère would have his option for the 2020 season declined by the Impact, bringing an end to his time with the club after two seasons.

=== Pacific FC ===
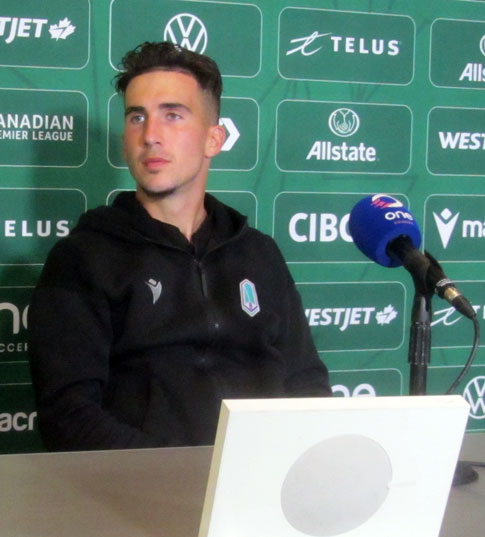
Meilleur-Giguère as a member of Pacific FC in 2024

On January 21, 2020, Meilleur-Giguère signed with Canadian Premier League side Pacific FC. He made his debut on August 15 against the HFX Wanderers. In January 2022, Pacific announced they had re-signed Meilleur-Giguère to a multi-year contract.

=== HFX Wanderers ===
On December 4, 2024, Meilleur-Giguère signed a two-year contract with HFX Wanderers.

== International career ==
Meilleur-Giguère was called to numerous Canadian U-18 in 2014 and 2015. On March 17, 2016, he was called up to the Canada U20 squad in their two games against England. In August 2016, he was called up to the U-20 team for a pair of friendlies against Costa Rica Meilleur-Giguère was nominated for Canada's U-20 player of the year in 2016. In February 2017, Meilleur-Giguère was named to Canada's roster for the 2017 CONCACAF U-20 Championship Meilleur-Giguère was named to the Canadian U-23 provisional roster for the 2020 CONCACAF Men's Olympic Qualifying Championship on February 26, 2020. He was named to the final squad ahead of the rescheduled tournament in March 2021, but eventually pulled out due to an injury suffered in training.

== Career statistics ==
As of games played on October 27, 2025

Appearances and goals by club, season and competition
Club	Season	League			Playoffs		Domestic cup (Note: Appearances in the Canadian Championship)		Continental		Total	
Club	Season	Division	Apps	Goals	Apps	Goals	Apps	Goals	Apps	Goals	Apps	Goals
FC Montreal	2016	USL	21	2	—		—		—		21	2
Ottawa Fury	2017	USL	4	0	—		0	0	—		4	0
Ottawa Fury (loan)	2018	USL	27	1	—		4	0	—		31	1
Ottawa Fury (loan)	2019	USL Championship	30	1	1	0	4	0	—		35	1
Ottawa Fury (loan)	Total		61	2	1	0	8	0	0	0	70	2
Pacific FC	2020	Canadian Premier League	10	0	—		—		—		10	0
Pacific FC	2021	Canadian Premier League	8	0	2	0	2	0	—		12	0
Pacific FC	2022	Canadian Premier League	27	0	2	1	1	0	4	0	34	1
Pacific FC	2023	Canadian Premier League	26	4	3	0	2	0	—		31	4
Pacific FC	2024	Canadian Premier League	27	3	1	0	5	0	—		33	3
Pacific FC	Total		98	7	8	1	10	0	4	0	120	8
HFX Wanderers FC	2025	Canadian Premier League	28	4	1	0	1	1	—		30	5
Career total			208	15	10	1	19	1	4	0	241	17

== Honours ==
Pacific FC

- Canadian Premier League: 2021
