= Gerardo Bruna =

Argentine professional footballer

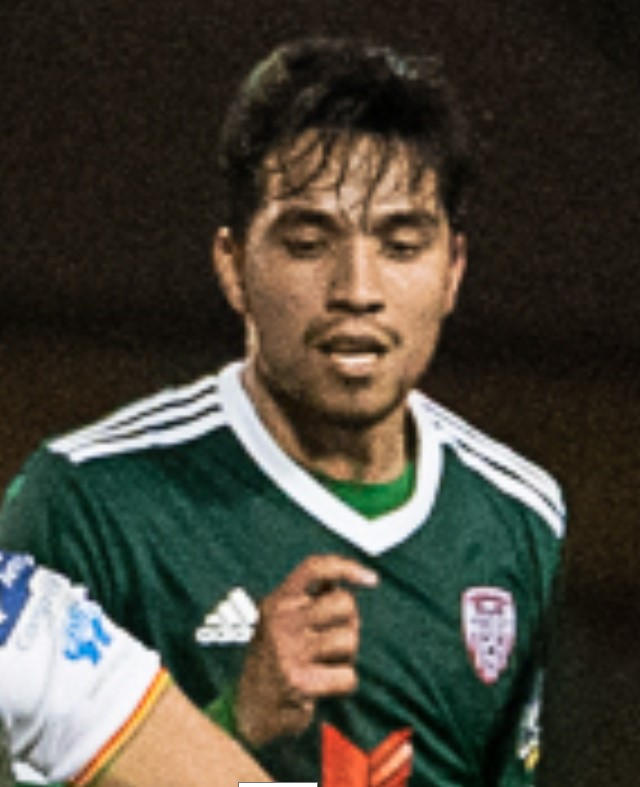
- Bruna playing for Derry City in 2019

Personal information
- Full name: Gerardo Alfredo Bruna Blanco
- Date of birth: 29 January 1991 (age 35)
- Place of birth: Mendoza, Argentina
- Height: 1.80 m (5 ft 11 in)
- Position: Midfielder

Youth career
- 2002–2007: Real Madrid
- 2007–2008: Liverpool

Senior career*
Years	Team	Apps	(Gls)
2008–2011	Liverpool	0	(0)
2011–2013	Blackpool	2	(0)
2013–2014	Huesca	17	(1)
2014	Tranmere Rovers	0	(0)
2014	Whitehawk	5	(1)
2015–2016	Accrington Stanley	9	(0)
2016–2018	Ottawa Fury	37	(1)
2016	→ Ottawa Fury Academy	3	(0)
2019–2020	Derry City	33	(1)
2021	Shelbourne	0	(0)
2022–2023	Dungannon Swifts	20	(1)

International career^{‡}
2008	Spain U17	1	(1)
2009	Argentina U20	1	(0)
- * Club domestic league appearances and goals as of 9th June 2023 ‡ National team caps and goals as of 26th February 2012

Gerardo Alfredo Bruna Blanco (born 29 January 1991) is an Argentine professional footballer who plays as a midfielder.

He was on the books of Real Madrid and Liverpool as a teenager but never made a senior appearance for either club. He has spent most of his career in the lower leagues of England and Spain, moving frequently.

Born in Argentina and raised in Spain, Bruna first represented Spain at a youth international level, before switching to represent his native Argentina.

== Club career ==
=== Youth career ===
Bruna spent five years in the youth set-up at Real Madrid from 2002 to 2007.

In the summer of 2007 Bruna moved to England to sign for Liverpool, having been offered and turned down a professional contract by Real Madrid.

"My father agreed with me that moving here would be a great opportunity. I already knew about Liverpool from the Champions League, the final we won and the final we lost. These games, as well as the Chelsea semi-finals, made a big impression on me." A left-footer with a talent for set pieces, he learnt his trade with the reserves, helping them to win the Premier Reserve League in 2007–08.

=== Blackpool ===
Bruna joined Championship side Blackpool on a two-year deal, with an option for a further 12 months, on 17 July 2011. He made his competitive debut as a substitute in the League Cup defeat to Sheffield Wednesday on 11 August 2011. He made his Football League debut in a 2–1 defeat at home to Nottingham Forest on 22 October, coming on as a late substitute.

With four total appearances to his name, Bruna was released by Blackpool on 9 May 2013.

=== Huesca ===
On 20 September 2013 Bruna joined SD Huesca, freshly relegated to Segunda División B. He played 17 games for the Aragonese club, scoring one goal.

=== Tranmere Rovers ===
Bruna played in a number of pre-season friendlies for League Two club Tranmere Rovers in the summer of 2014, before picking up an injury. He was then offered a one-month contract by the club. He made his only appearance for the club as a substitute in a league cup match but was not offered a long-term contract.

=== Whitehawk ===
Bruna signed a one-month contract with Whitehawk, who then played in England's 6th tier, with the option to extend by the club depending on performances. The signing of Bruna was described as a "massive coup" as Bruna had previously played for clubs such as Real Madrid and Liverpool. Bruna scored his first goal for Whitehawk in a 5–1 victory over Chelmsford City.

=== Accrington Stanley ===
In January 2015, Bruna joined League Two club Accrington Stanley. He scored his first goal for the club in a 2–1 loss to Bury in the Football League Trophy on 1 September 2015. On 18 January 2016, Bruna signed a pre-contract with Canadian club Ottawa Fury which would have him depart at the end of the season.

=== Ottawa Fury ===
On 15 February 2016, Bruna was offered contracts with both Accrington and Ottawa; he decided to join Ottawa, for an undisclosed fee .

=== Derry City ===
On 5 February 2019, Bruna signed with League of Ireland Premier Division side Derry City. On 4 December 2020, Bruna announced his departure from the club after two seasons.

=== Shelbourne ===
In February 2021, Bruna signed for Shelbourne ahead of their first season back in the League of Ireland First Division having been relegated 3 months previously. He suffered an Anterior cruciate ligament injury before the season started, which kept him out of action for the entire season meaning he never played a competitive game for the club.

=== Dungannon Swifts ===
In September 2022, he signed for NIFL Premiership club Dungannon Swifts.

== International career ==
Bruna has represented both Argentina and Spain at youth level. In May 2008 he was a member of the Spain under-17 squad European Under-17 Football Championship in Turkey. He made one appearance in the group stages as a second-half substitute in a 3–3 draw with France at the Mardan Sports Complex, Aksu, Antalya. Bruna represented the Argentina national under-20 football team at the 2009 Toulon tournament.

== Personal life ==
His wife is from Liverpool.

== Career statistics ==
As of 14 September 2022

Club statistics
Club	Season	League			National Cup		League Cup		Continental		Other		Total	
Club	Season	Division	Apps	Goals	Apps	Goals	Apps	Goals	Apps	Goals	Apps	Goals	Apps	Goals
Blackpool	2011–12	Championship	1	0	1	0	1	0	—		—		3	0
Blackpool	2012–13	Championship	1	0	0	0	0	0	—		—		1	0
Blackpool	Total		2	0	1	0	1	0	0	0	—		4	0
Huesca	2013–14	Segunda División B	17	1	0	0	—		—		—		17	1
Tranmere Rovers	2014–15	League Two	0	0	—		1	0	—		—		1	0
Whitehawk	2014–15	Conference South	5	1	—		—		—		1 (Note: Appearance in FA Trophy)	0	6	1
Accrington Stanley	2014–15	League Two	6	0	—		—		—		—		6	0
Accrington Stanley	2015–16	League Two	3	0	0	0	1	0	—		1 (Note: Appearance in Football League Trophy)	1	5	1
Accrington Stanley	Total		9	0	0	0	1	0	0	0	1	1	11	1
Ottawa Fury Academy	2016	PLSQ	3	0	—		0	0	—		—		3	0
Ottawa Fury	2016	NASL	6	0	0	0	—		—		—		6	0
Ottawa Fury	2017	United Soccer League	26	1	1	0	—		—		—		27	1
Ottawa Fury	2018	United Soccer League	5	0	0	0	—		—		—		5	0
Ottawa Fury	Total		37	1	1	0	—		—		—		38	1
Derry City	2019	League of Ireland Premier Division	26	1	0	0	3	1	—		—		29	2
Derry City	2020	League of Ireland Premier Division	7	0	1	0	—		1 (Note: Appearance in UEFA Europa League)	0	—		9	0
Derry City	Total		33	1	1	0	3	1	1	0	—		38	2
Shelbourne	2021	League of Ireland First Division	0	0	0	0	—		—		—		0	0
Dungannon Swifts	2022–23	NIFL Premiership	0	0	0	0	0	0	—		—		0	0
Career total			106	4	2	0	6	1	1	0	2	1	109	6
