= Jamar Dixon =

Canadian professional soccer player

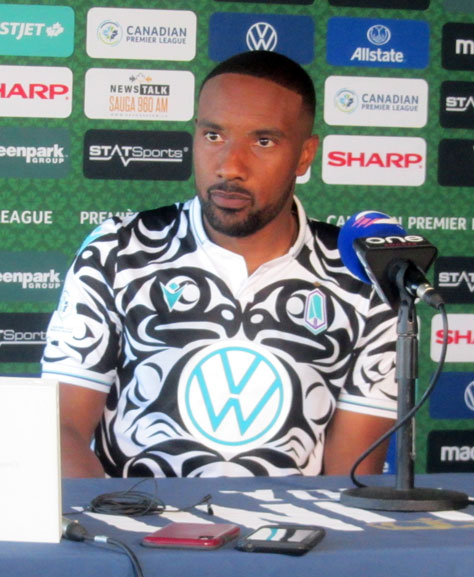
- Dixon in 2022

Personal information
- Date of birth: June 5, 1989 (age 37)
- Place of birth: Ottawa,Ontario, Canada
- Height: 1.78 m (5 ft 10 in)
- Position: Midfielder

Youth career
- Ottawa Gloucester SC

College career
Years	Team	Apps	(Gls)
2008–2011	St. Francis Xavier X-Men	53	(17)

Senior career*
Years	Team	Apps	(Gls)
2009–2011	Victoria Highlanders	33	(5)
2013	BW 90 IF	25	(3)
2014	TP-47	5	(1)
2014	Jippo	4	(0)
2015–2016	FF Jaro	40	(4)
2016–2019	Ottawa Fury	87	(2)
2020–2022	Pacific FC	54	(2)
Total		248	(17)

International career
2016	Canada	3	(0)
- * Club domestic league appearances and goals

Jamar Dixon (born June 5, 1989) is a retired Canadian professional soccer player. He currently serves as Manager of Football and Player Development for Canadian Premier League club Pacific FC.

== Club career ==
=== Sweden ===
Dixon began his professional career in Sweden, joining BW 90 IF in Sweden's fourth tier. He scored a goal in his first match with the club.

=== Finland ===
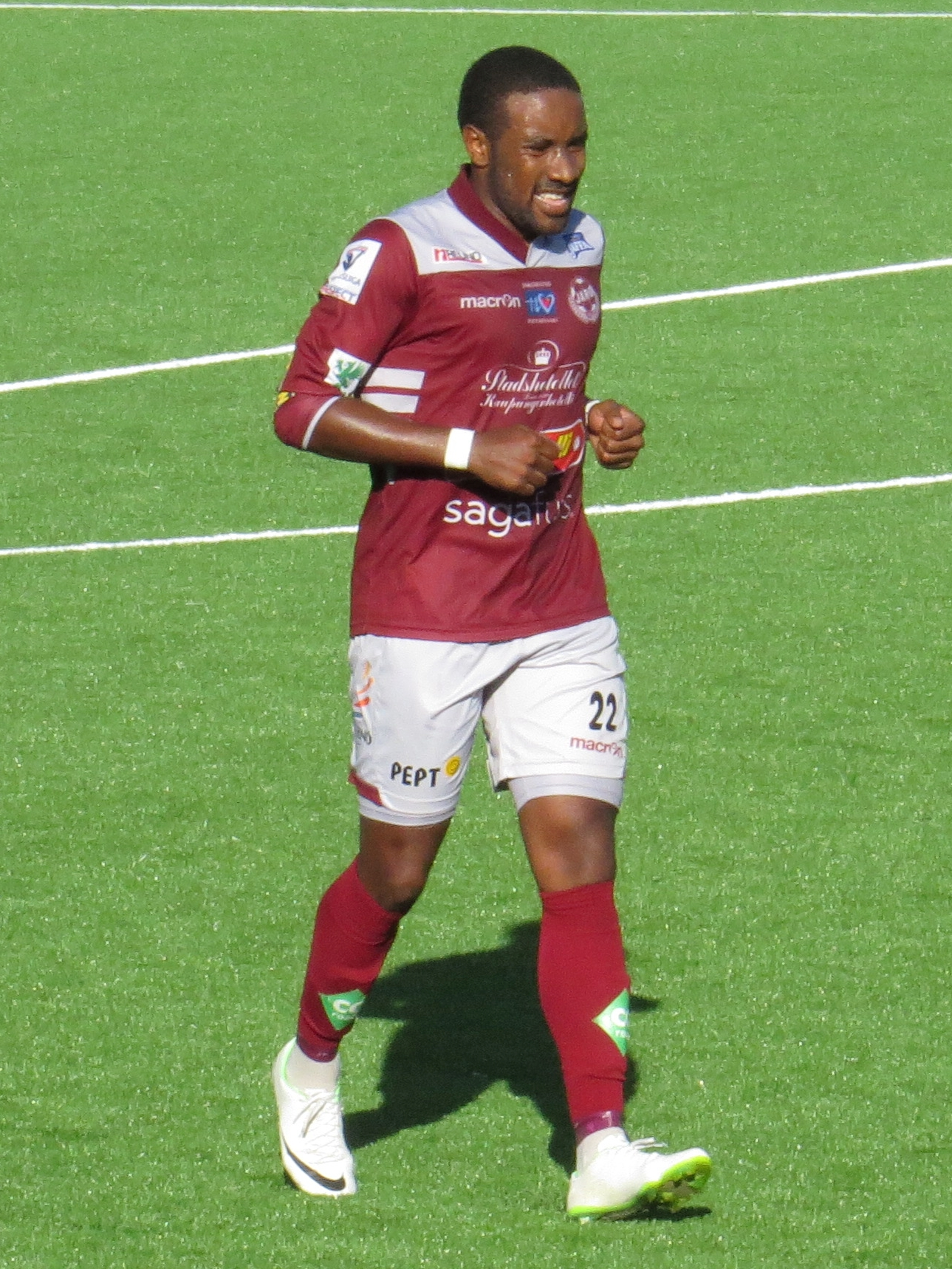
Dixon with FF Jaro in 2015

Dixon left Sweden and joined Finnish side TP-47 in early 2014. He would later make the jump to fellow Finnish team Jippo on September 1, 2014.

Dixon signed with top flight outfit FF Jaro after a successful trial on January 26, 2015. He made his debut on February 7 in the Finnish Cup. Dixon made his league debut for Jaro against IFK Mariehamn on April 12 in a 1–1 draw. Dixon scored his first Veikkausliiga goal on May 17 in a 3–2 loss against HIFK Fotboll. Jaro would finish the 2015 Veikkausliiga season at the bottom of the table, and were relegated to the Ykkönen for the 2016 season.

=== Ottawa Fury ===
On July 20, 2016, FF Jaro announced that Jamar Dixon had signed with the Ottawa Fury of the North American Soccer League. Dixon made his debut on July 27, 2016 against the Carolina Railhawks. In November 2016, the Fury announced that they had re-signed Dixon, and that he would stay with the club as it moved to the United Soccer League for the 2017 season. In June 2017, Dixon would score his first goal for the club in a 2–2 draw with New York Red Bulls II. Dixon would be named the Fury's team MVP of the year for the 2017 season, and would re-sign with the club following the 2017 season. After the 2018 season, the Fury would announce that Dixon would return to the Fury for the 2019 season. After four seasons with the Fury, the club would cease operations for the 2020 season, making Dixon a free agent.

=== Pacific FC ===
On January 21, 2020, Dixon signed with Canadian Premier League side Pacific FC. He made his debut as a substitute on August 15 against the HFX Wanderers. Prior to the 2021 season, Dixon was named Pacific FC captain due to the retirement of former captain Marcel de Jong. In January 2022, he signed a new one-year contract with Pacific. In September 2022 Pacific announced that at the conclusion of the season Dixon would be retiring. Upon his retirement, Pacific announced Dixon would be joining the club's front office as their Manager of Football and Player Development.

== International career ==
Dixon made his debut for the Canadian national team in a friendly against the United States on February 5, 2016. In August 2016, Dixon was called up for Canada's final fourth round qualifiers for the 2018 FIFA World Cup against Honduras and El Salvador.

== Personal life ==
Dixon was born in Ottawa to a Jamaican father and a Barbadian mother. He is a cousin of former professional basketball player Ryan Bell. His nephew, Elijah Roche, is also a professional soccer player.

== Honours ==
Pacific FC

- Canadian Premier League: 2021

== Career statistics ==
=== Club ===
As of March 9, 2024

Club	League	Season	League		Playoffs		Domestic Cup		Total	
Club	League	Season	Apps	Goals	Apps	Goals	Apps	Goals	Apps	Goals
TP-47	Kakkonen	2014	5	1	0	0	0	0	5	1
Jippo	Kakkonen	2014	4	0	0	0	0	0	4	0
FF Jaro	Veikkausliiga	2015	27	3	0	0	4	0	31	3
FF Jaro	Ykkönen	2016	13	1	0	0	0	0	13	1
FF Jaro	Total		40	4	0	0	4	0	44	4
Ottawa Fury	NASL	2016	12	0	0	0	0	0	12	0
Ottawa Fury	USL	2017	28	2	0	0	4	0	32	2
Ottawa Fury	USL	2018	30	0	0	0	4	0	34	0
Ottawa Fury	USL	2019	17	0	0	0	2	0	19	0
Ottawa Fury	Total		87	2	0	0	10	0	97	2
Pacific FC	CPL	2020	9	1	0	0	0	0	9	1
Pacific FC	CPL	2021	24	1	2	0	3	0	29	1
Pacific FC	CPL	2022	21	0	2	0	1	0	24	0
Pacific FC	Total		54	2	4	0	4	0	62	2
Career Total			190	9	4	0	18	0	212	9

=== International ===
As of February 18, 2018

Canada national team
2016	3	0
Total	3	0
