= Callum Irving =

Canadian soccer player (born 1993)

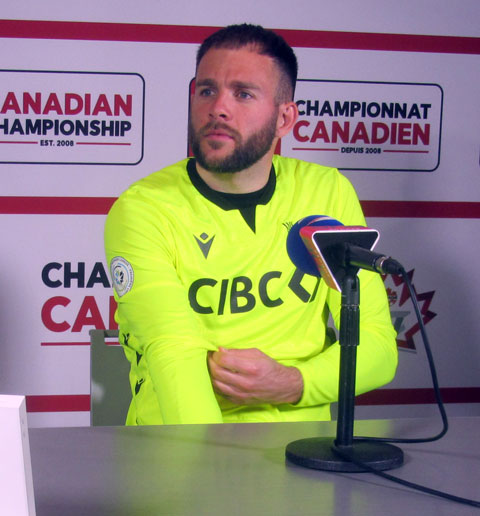
- Irving in 2023

Personal information
- Full name: Callum Ernest John Irving
- Date of birth: March 16, 1993 (age 33)
- Place of birth: Vancouver, British Columbia, Canada
- Height: 1.86 m (6 ft 1 in)
- Position: Goalkeeper

Team information
- Current team: Vancouver FC
- Number: 1

Youth career
- 1997–2007: Marpole SC
- 2007–2009: Vancouver Selects
- 2007–2012: Vancouver Whitecaps FC

College career
Years	Team	Apps	(Gls)
2012–2015	Kentucky Wildcats	58	(0)

Senior career*
Years	Team	Apps	(Gls)
2010–2011	Whitecaps Residency	11	(0)
2016	Rio Grande Valley Toros	14	(0)
2016	→ Houston Dynamo (loan)	0	(0)
2017–2019	Ottawa Fury	65	(0)
2020–2022	Pacific FC	57	(0)
2023–2026	Vancouver FC	107	(0)

International career^{‡}
2011	Canada U18	1	(0)
2012	Canada U20	2	(0)
2017	Canada	1	(0)
- * Club domestic league appearances and goals as of 19:15, 12 November 2026 (UTC) ‡ National team caps and goals as of 19:15, 12 November 2026 (UTC)

Callum Ernest John Irving (born March 16, 1993) is a Canadian former professional soccer player who played as a goalkeeper.

He began his career playing for local clubs in Vancouver before joining the Whitecaps FC Academy in 2007. After attending the University of Kentucky, he went undrafted in the 2016 MLS SuperDraft and subsequently joined Rio Grande Valley FC Toros. After a short-term loan spell at Houston Dynamo, Irving joined Ottawa Fury in December 2016.

Irving has won a single cap with the Canada national team.

== Club career ==
=== Youth and college ===
Irving began playing soccer at the age of four and spent 10 years with Marpole SC. He also played for the Vancouver Selects for two seasons, and represented the British Columbia provincial team at U16 level.

In 2007, he joined the Whitecaps FC Academy and appeared for Premier Development League side Vancouver Whitecaps FC U-23 in 2010 and 2011.

Irving played four years of college soccer at the University of Kentucky between 2012 and 2015. In his 2014 season, Irving was named NSCAA Third Team All-America, NSCAA First Team All-Southeast Region, Conference USA Player of the Year, Defensive MVP, Golden Glove and First Team All-Conference USA.

In his 2015 season, Irving was named NSCAA First Team All-America, NSCAA First Team All-Southeast Region and Conference USA Player of the Year, Conference USA Defensive MVP, Golden Glove, First Team All-Conference USA and set a Kentucky Wildcats record with 27 shut-outs.

=== Rio Grande Valley Toros ===
On January 13, 2016, Irving signed a contract with Major League Soccer ahead of the 2016 MLS SuperDraft, where he was expected to go early on in the draft. However, Irving wasn't selected by any MLS team over the four rounds. He signed with United Soccer League side Rio Grande Valley FC Toros on March 26.

On May 29, Irving made his debut in a 1–1 draw against Saint Louis FC. He went on to make 14 appearances in his inaugural season, conceding nine goals and keeping eight shutouts.

==== Houston Dynamo (loan) ====
On September 16, 2016, Irving was signed on a short-term loan by the Houston Dynamo, an affiliate club of Rio Grande Valley Toros. Injuries to Tyler Deric and Calle Brown meant Irving was called in to act as backup to Joe Willis. On September 17, he was named as an unused substitute in a bloodless 1–0 affair against Real Salt Lake.

=== Ottawa Fury ===
On December 6, 2016, Irving joined Ottawa Fury ahead of their first season in the United Soccer League. He made his debut in a 3–2 defeat to Saint Louis FC on April 1, 2017, and went on to play in every minute of Ottawa's 2017 campaign, including all four Canadian Championship games. In doing so, he set a franchise record for consecutive starts. He was named Newcomer of the Year and Supporters Player of the Year at the end of the season after recording eight shutouts during the season.

In November 2017, Irving re-signed with Ottawa for the 2018 season. On April 14, 2018, his streak of consecutive starts came to an end after 38 games when he was named as an unused substitute in a 1–0 defeat to the Pittsburgh Riverhounds. Despite reports that Irving would not return after the 2018 season, it was later reported that he had re-signed for the 2019 season. After three seasons with the Fury, the club would cease operations for the 2020 season, making Irving a free agent.

=== Pacific FC ===
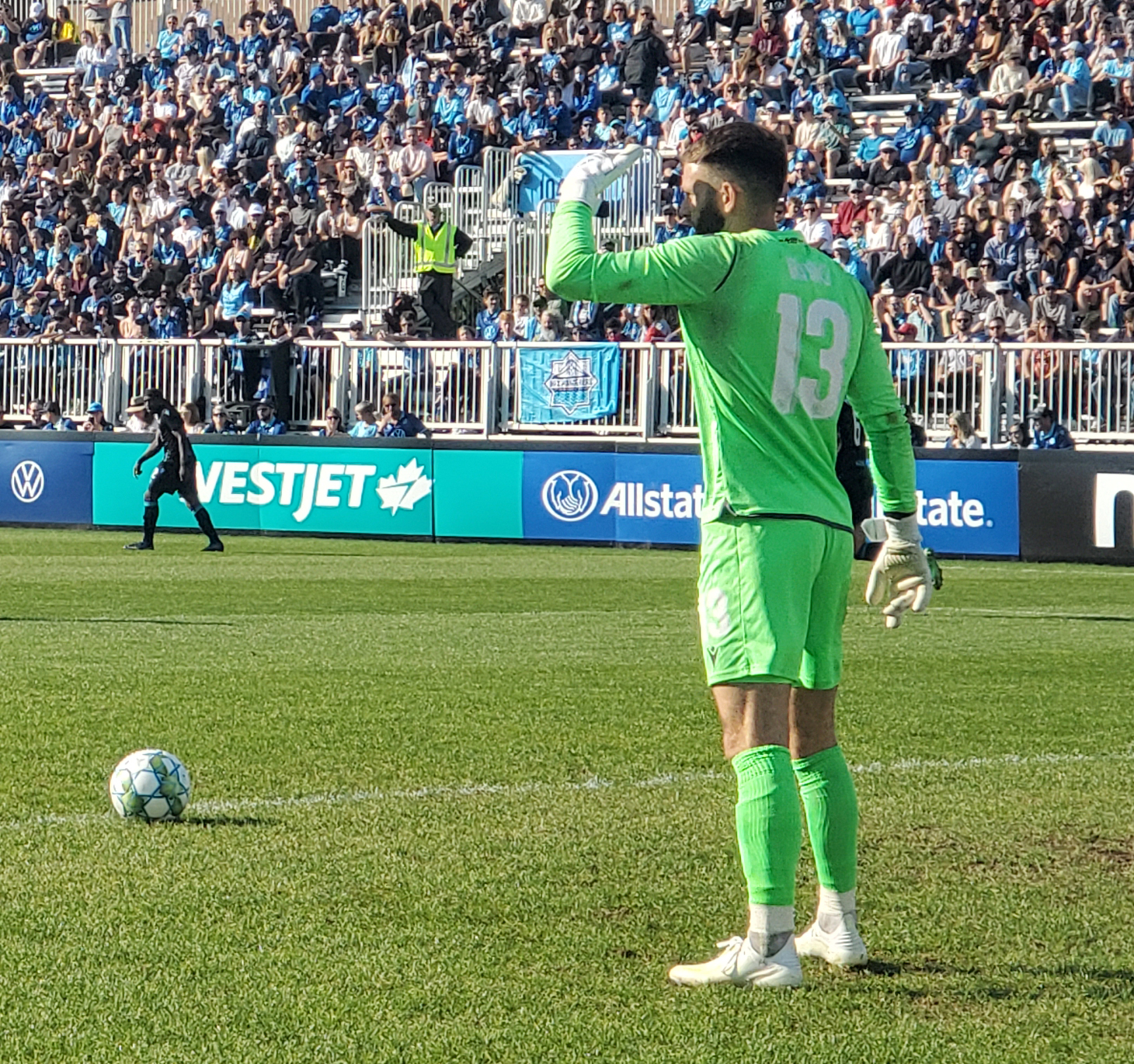
Irving in 2021 playing for Pacific FC

On February 19, 2020, Irving signed with Canadian Premier League side Pacific FC. He made his debut for Pacific on August 25, saving a penalty while keeping a clean sheet in a 2–0 victory over Valour FC. After backstopping Pacific to the 2021 CPL Championship, the club announced Irving would be returning to the team for the 2022 season. In December 2022, Pacific announced Irving was departing the club.

=== Vancouver FC ===
In December 2022, Irving was announced as Vancouver FC's first ever signing. He made his debut in their inaugural match against Pacific FC on April 15, 2023. After playing every minute of the 2024 season and serving as team captain, Irving signed an extension for the 2025 season, with an option for 2026.

On November 12, 2026, Irving announced his retirement from professional soccer.

== International career ==
Irving has been called for multiple camps with the Canadian U20 national team. In January 2016, Irving earned his first call up to the Canada national team for a friendly against the United States. He was an unused substitute as Canada suffered a 1–0 defeat. On January 22, 2017, he made his senior international debut in 4–2 win over Bermuda.

== Personal life ==
Born and raised in Vancouver, British Columbia, Irving attended David Lloyd George Elementary School, Sir Wilfrid Laurier Elementary School and Sir Winston Churchill Secondary School.

== Career statistics ==
As of match played November 5, 2026

Club	League	Season	League		Playoffs		Domestic Cup		Continental		Total	
Club	League	Season	Apps	Goals	Apps	Goals	Apps	Goals	Apps	Goals	Apps	Goals
Rio Grande Valley FC Toros	USL	2016	14	0	0	0	—		—		14	0
Houston Dynamo (loan)	MLS	2016	0	0	—		0	0	—		0	0
Ottawa Fury	USL	2017	32	0	—		4	0	—		36	0
Ottawa Fury	USL	2018	2	0	—		0	0	—		2	0
Ottawa Fury	USL Championship	2019	31	0	1	0	4	0	—		36	0
Ottawa Fury	Total		65	0	1	0	8	0	0	0	74	0
Pacific FC	Canadian Premier League	2020	6	0	—		0	0	—		6	0
Pacific FC	Canadian Premier League	2021	25	0	2	0	3	0	—		30	0
Pacific FC	Canadian Premier League	2022	26	0	2	0	1	0	4	0	33	0
Pacific FC	Total		57	0	4	0	4	0	4	0	69	0
Vancouver FC	Canadian Premier League	2023	27	0	—		1	0	—		28	0
Vancouver FC	Canadian Premier League	2024	28	0	—		1	0	—		29	0
Vancouver FC	Canadian Premier League	2025	28	0	—		6	0	—		34	0
Vancouver FC	Canadian Premier League	2026	24	0	0	0	3	0	2	0	29	0
Vancouver FC	Total		107	0	0	0	11	0	2	0	120	0
Career total			244	0	5	0	23	0	6	0	277	0

== Honours ==
Pacific FC

- Canadian Premier League: 2021
