= Sergio Manesio =

Angolan footballer

Personal information
- Date of birth: 1 July 1994 (age 32)
- Place of birth: Cabinda, Angola
- Positions: Midfielder; centre-back

Team information
- Current team: FC Romania

Youth career
- 2004–2009: Tottenham Hotspur
- 2009–2012: West Bromwich Albion

College career
Years	Team	Apps	(Gls)
2013–2016	Cleveland State	69	(16)

Senior career*
Years	Team	Apps	(Gls)
2015	AFC Cleveland		
2017–2018	Ottawa Fury	31	(0)
2019	Hampton & Richmond	1	(0)
2019	Hendon	13	(0)
2019	Braintree Town	6	(0)
2019–2020	Hendon	14	(0)
2021–	FC Romania	6	(0)
- * Club domestic league appearances and goals as of 21:31, 3 March 2020 (UTC)

Sergio Manesio (born 1 July 1994) is a professional footballer who plays as a defensive midfielder or centre-back for FC Romania.

== Career ==
Manesio was born in Angola before moving to London, England at the age of six where he played for Tottenham and West Bromwich Albion. He attended Cleveland State University between 2013 and 2016 and played college soccer for the Cleveland State Vikings.

=== Ottawa Fury ===
In January 2017, Manesio signed with Ottawa Fury FC in the USL. Manesio was named as one of the Fury's two Newcomers of the Year at the end of the season.

In November 2017, Manesio re-signed with Ottawa for the 2018 season.

=== Return to England ===
Returning to England in 2019, Manesio joined Hampton & Richmond and a few days later, Hendon, on a dual registration. After impressing during pre-season in the summer 2019, he joined Braintree Town. On 30 September 2019 Braintree confirmed, that he had returned to Hendon. Manesio joined FC Romania for the 2020–21 season.
