= Jimmy-Shammar Sanon =

Haitian footballer (born 1997)

Personal information
- Date of birth: 24 January 1997 (age 29)
- Place of birth: Laval, Quebec, Canada
- Height: 1.78 m (5 ft 10 in)
- Position: Winger

Youth career
- Étoiles de L'Est
- CS Monteuil
- 2012–2016: Montreal Impact

Senior career*
Years	Team	Apps	(Gls)
2016	FC Montreal	4	(1)
2017–2018	Ottawa Fury	25	(1)

International career^{‡}
2014	Canada U18	4	(0)
2016–2017	Haiti U20	6	(2)
2017	Canada U20	2	(0)
2017–2018	Haiti	5	(0)
- * Club domestic league appearances and goals as of 23 October 2018 ‡ National team caps and goals as of 21 October 2017

Jimmy-Shammar Sanon (born 24 January 1997) is a Haitian footballer.

== Club career ==
=== FC Montreal ===
Sanon signed his first professional contract for Montreal Impact reserve team FC Montreal on 4 July 2017. He made his debut against Louisville City on July 5, 2016.

=== Ottawa Fury ===
On 23 March 2017 Sanon was signed by Montreal Impact affiliate Ottawa Fury.

In November 2017, Sanon re-signed with Ottawa for the 2018 season.

== International ==
In December 2013, Sanon was called up by Canada for an U16 camp. He subsequently participated in an U18 camp in April 2014 and played for the Canadian U18s at the 2014 Tournoi de Limoges in October of the same year.

In October 2016, he was called up by Haiti for their U-20 team to compete in the 2017 CONCACAF U-20 Championship qualifying tournament.

Sanon made his debut for the senior Haiti national football team in a 3-3 2017 Kirin Challenge Cup tie with Japan on 10 October 2017. In May 2019, he was named to Haiti's 40-man provisional squad for the 2019 CONCACAF Gold Cup.

== Honours ==
=== Individual ===
- USL Goal of the Year: 2016
