= Sito Seoane =

American soccer forward (born 1989)

Personal information
- Full name: José Enrique Seoane Vergara
- Date of birth: March 16, 1989 (age 37)
- Place of birth: Miami, Florida, United States
- Height: 5 ft 9 in (1.75 m)
- Position: Forward

Team information
- Current team: Betanzos

Youth career
- Montañeros
- Maravillas
- Eiris
- Laracha

College career
Years	Team	Apps	(Gls)
2013–2014	San Jacinto	37	(46)
2014–2015	Southern New Hampshire	10	(10)

Senior career*
Years	Team	Apps	(Gls)
2013–2014	Austin Aztex	30	(13)
2015	ÍBV	11	(6)
2016	Fylkir	20	(2)
2017–2018	Ottawa Fury	31	(6)
2018	Grindavík	18	(4)
2019–2020	Chattanooga Red Wolves	28	(7)
2020–2022	ÍBV	55	(18)
2023	Bergantiños	11	(0)
2024–	Betanzos	6	(1)
- * Club domestic league appearances and goals as of 12:28, 28 March 2024 (UTC)

José Enrique "Sito" Seoane Vergara (born March 16, 1989) is an American soccer forward who plays for Betanzos.

== Playing career ==
After playing at San Jacinto College for two years and with USL PDL side Austin Aztex, Seoane played a single season at Southern New Hampshire University. He then played in Iceland with ÍBV and Fylkir in 2015 and 2016, before signing with United Soccer League side Ottawa Fury on October 10, 2016.

On May 9, 2018, Seoane announced his departure from the Ottawa Fury on Twitter after making three appearances and scoring one goal in the 2018 season. Six days later, May 15, 2018, Seoane announced he had signed for Grindavík.

On December 19, 2018, Seoane signed with USL League One side Chattanooga Red Wolves ahead of their inaugural 2019 season.
