= David Paulmin =

Canadian soccer goalkeeper (born 1996)

Personal information
- Date of birth: January 24, 1996 (age 30)
- Place of birth: Sainte-Thérèse, Quebec, Canada
- Height: 1.89 m (6 ft 2 in)
- Position: Goalkeeper

Youth career
- 2012–2015: Montreal Impact

Senior career*
Years	Team	Apps	(Gls)
2015–2016	FC Montreal	17	(0)
2017	Ottawa Fury	0	(0)
2018–2020	Kvik Halden	58	(0)
2021	Egersunds	0	(0)
2021–2022	Stjørdals-Blink	17	(0)
- * Club domestic league appearances and goals as of 17 October 2024

David Paulmin (born January 24, 1996) is a Canadian soccer goalkeeper who plays for Norwegian club Stjørdals-Blink.

== Club career ==
=== FC Montreal ===
After spending four years with the Montreal Impact Academy, Paulmin joined USL club FC Montreal for their inaugural season. He made his professional debut on April 11, 2015 in a 3–0 defeat to the Rochester Rhinos. FC Montreal would cease operations after the 2016 USL season.

=== Ottawa Fury ===
After 2 years with FC Montreal, Paulmin signed with Ottawa Fury of the USL prior to the 2017 season. After failing to make an appearance in the 2017 season, Paulmin was released.

=== Kvik Halden ===
On 1 April 2018, Paulmin signed with Norwegian 3. divisjon club Kvik Halden FK and appeared in the team's final pre-season friendly the following day against KFUM Oslo, a 3–3 draw. He made his competitive debut for the club on 18 April in the first round of the 2018 Norwegian Football Cup, a 4–0 loss to 2. divisjon club Fredrikstad. Paulmin would help Kvik Halden achieve promotion to the 2. divisjon in 2018, starting 22 league games during the season. In 2019, Paulmin would start 28 league games, as Kvik Halden would lose out on a second consecutive promotion to the 1. divisjon to Åsane.

=== Egersunds IK ===
After three seasons with Kvik Halden, Paulmin would move to fellow 2. Divisjon club Egersunds, signing a two-year contract for the 2021 and 2022 seasons.

=== Stjørdals-Blink ===
In September 2021, Paulmin would sign with OBOS-ligaen club Stjørdals-Blink for the remainder of the 2021 season.

== Career statistics ==
=== Club ===
As of September 11, 2022

Club	League	Season	League		Cup		Playoffs		Total	
Club	League	Season	Apps	Goals	Apps	Goals	Apps	Goals	Apps	Goals
FC Montreal	USL	2015	9	0	—		0	0	9	0
FC Montreal	USL	2016	8	0	—		0	0	8	0
FC Montreal	Total		17	0	0	0	0	0	17	0
Ottawa Fury	USL	2017	0	0	0	0	0	0	0	0
Kvik Halden FK	3. divisjon	2018	22	0	1	0	0	0	23	0
Kvik Halden FK	2. divisjon	2019	26	0	2	0	2	0	30	0
Kvik Halden FK	2. divisjon	2020	10	0	0	0	0	0	10	0
Kvik Halden FK	Total		58	0	3	0	2	0	63	0
Stjørdals-Blink	OBOS-ligaen	2021	5	0	0	0	0	0	5	0
Stjørdals-Blink	OBOS-ligaen	2022	12	0	0	0	0	0	12	0
Stjørdals-Blink	Total		17	0	0	0	0	0	17	0
Career total			94	0	3	0	2	0	99	0

== International career ==
Paulmin holds both Canadian and French nationalities.
