= Andrae Campbell =

Jamaican footballer (born 1989)

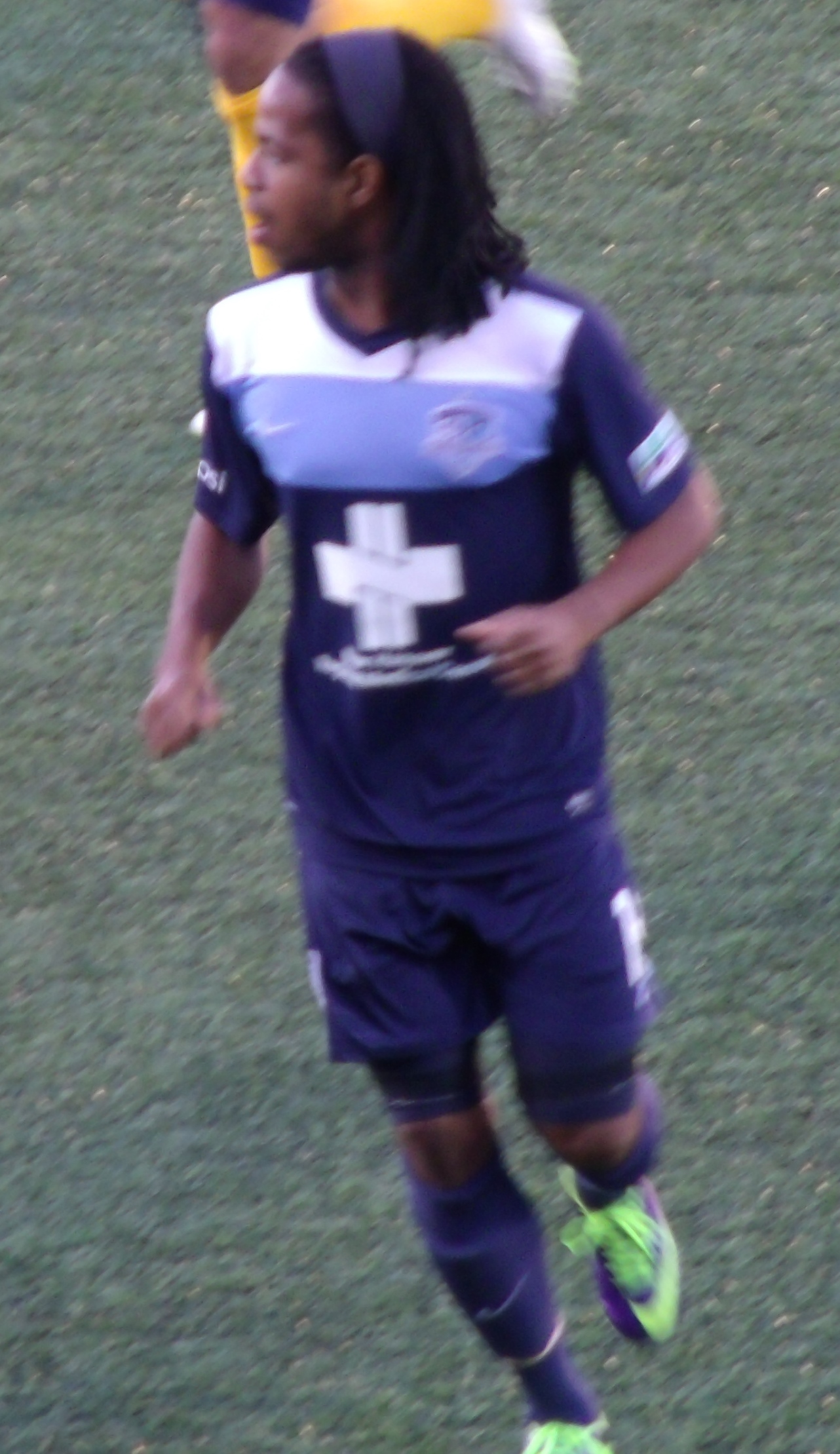
- Campbell with the Wilmington Hammerheads in 2014

Personal information
- Date of birth: 14 March 1989 (age 37)
- Place of birth: Portmore, Jamaica
- Position: Left-back

Senior career*
Years	Team	Apps	(Gls)
2006–2011	Portmore United		
2011–2012	Waterhouse		
2012–2013	Notodden FK	9	(0)
2014–2015	Wilmington Hammerheads	42	(1)
2016	Orange County Blues	18	(0)
2017	Ottawa Fury	26	(0)
2018–2019	Ontario Fury (indoor)	6	(1)

International career^{‡}
- Jamaica U20
2011	Jamaica U23		
2009–	Jamaica	7	(0)
- * Club domestic league appearances and goals as of 25 November 2019 ‡ National team caps and goals as of 18 September 2014

Andrae Campbell (born 14 March 1989) is a Jamaican international footballer who plays as a defender. When he plays outdoors, Campbell primarily plays as a left-back.

== Career ==
Campbell has played club football for Portmore United and Waterhouse.

In 2012, Campbell signed with Notodden FK in Norway. On 28 March 2014 left Norway to sign with American USL Professional League side Wilmington Hammerheads FC. Campbell is one of three Jamaican, alongside Jason Watson and Ashani Fairclough who signed during the 2014 winter transfer window.

In November 2016, Campbell signed with the Ottawa Fury for the 2017 season. He left the club in November 2017

== International career ==
Campbell represented Jamaica at the U20 level in 2009. In August 2011, he was a member of the under-23 national team competing in Olympic qualifying. He made his senior international debut for Jamaica in 2008.
