= Jason Watson (footballer) =

Jamaican footballer (born 1991)

Personal information
- Date of birth: 2 March 1991 (age 35)
- Place of birth: Jamaica
- Height: 1.82 m (5 ft 11 1/2 in)
- Position: Midfielder

Youth career
- 2009–2011: Waterhouse

Senior career*
Years	Team	Apps	(Gls)
2011–2014	Waterhouse		
2012	→ Jersey Express (loan)	14	(0)
2013	→ KPV (loan)	15	(2)
2014	Wilmington Hammerheads	2	(0)

International career^{‡}
2011	Jamaica U20	2	(0)
2011	Jamaica U23	1	(0)
- * Club domestic league appearances and goals as of 18 September 2014 ‡ National team caps and goals as of 27 July 2014

Jason Watson (born 2 March 1991) is a Jamaican footballer who most recently played for Wilmington Hammerheads, as a midfielder.

== Career ==
Watson played with Waterhouse F.C. between 2011 and 2014, including two loan spells with USL PDL club Jersey Express in 2012 and Finnish club KPV Kokkola in 2013. Watson signed with USL Pro club Wilmington Hammerheads on 26 March 2014.
