= Kyle Venter =

American professional soccer player (born 1991)

Personal information
- Date of birth: March 13, 1991 (age 35)
- Place of birth: Aurora, Colorado, United States
- Height: 1.91 m (6 ft 3 in)
- Position: Defender

College career
Years	Team	Apps	(Gls)
2009–2013	New Mexico Lobos	86	(8)

Senior career*
Years	Team	Apps	(Gls)
2012	Real Colorado Foxes	11	(0)
2014	LA Galaxy	0	(0)
2014	→ LA Galaxy II (loan)	9	(1)
2015	Tulsa Roughnecks	24	(3)
2016–2017	Ottawa Fury	17	(0)
2018	Penn FC	25	(2)
2019	FC Tucson	23	(4)
2020	Richmond Kickers	15	(0)
Total		124	(10)

Managerial career
- 2019–2021: Arizona Wildcats (assistant)
- 2021–: Florida Gators (assistant)
- * Club domestic league appearances and goals

Kyle Venter (born March 13, 1991) is an American retired professional soccer player. Venter is currently an assistant coach for the Florida Gators women's soccer team.

== Career ==
=== Early career ===
Venter played college soccer at the University of New Mexico between 2009 and 2013. During his time at college Venter also played for USL PDL club Real Colorado Foxes during their 2012 season.

=== LA Galaxy ===
Venter was selected by LA Galaxy in the second round of the 2014 MLS SuperDraft (23rd overall). After signing with the club, Venter was loaned to LA Galaxy II and featured in their win over Orange County Blues FC on March 22, 2014.

=== Tulsa Roughnecks ===
Venter signed with USL club Tulsa Roughnecks in March 2015.

=== Ottawa Fury ===
On February 11, 2016, Venter signed with Canadian club Ottawa Fury FC.

=== Penn FC ===
Venter played with Penn FC in 2018.

=== FC Tucson ===
Venter was contracted to FC Tucson in February 2019.

=== Richmond Kickers ===
On January 15, 2020, Venter joined USL League One side Richmond Kickers.

== Coaching ==
Venter spent two seasons working under Tony Amato as an assistant for the Arizona Wildcats before following Amato to the University of Florida.

== Honors ==
- MLS Cup: 2014
