= Aron Mkungilwa =

Canadian soccer player (born 1996)

Personal information
- Date of birth: May 3, 1996 (age 30)
- Place of birth: South Kivu, Zaire
- Height: 1.63 m (5 ft 4 in)
- Position: Left-back

Youth career
- Laser SC
- 2012–2015: Montreal Impact

Senior career*
Years	Team	Apps	(Gls)
2015–2016	FC Montreal	28	(2)
2017	Ottawa Fury	4	(0)

International career^{‡}
2013	Canada U17	1	(0)
- * Club domestic league appearances and goals as of February 23, 2018 ‡ National team caps and goals as of August 26, 2015

Aron Mkungilwa (born May 3, 1996) is a Canadian soccer player who played as a defender.

== Club career ==
=== Youth career ===
Mkungilwa joined the Montreal Impact Academy in 2012 and initially played with their junior team in the U.S. Soccer Development Academy. He would also appear with the senior academy team in the Canadian Soccer League's first division. He helped the senior team produce a nine-game undefeated streak and secure a playoff berth by finishing second in the division. Montreal reached the championship final match and was defeated by Toronto Croatia.

In 2013, he resumed playing with the academy team in the United States-based U.S. Soccer Development Academy.

=== FC Montreal ===
After spending four years with the Montreal Impact Academy, Mkungilwa signed a professional contract with USL affiliate club FC Montreal for the last half of the 2015 season. He made his professional debut on August 5, 2015 in a 4–0 victory over Louisville City FC. In his debut season, he played in 4 matches. He was re-signed by the club the following season. He recorded his first goal for Montreal on July 16, 2016, against Rochester New York. In his second season with Montreal, he appeared in 24 matches and contributed 2 goals. After two seasons of operation, the parent club disbanded FC Montreal.

Mkungilwa was invited to a preseason training camp held by Montreal's senior team in January 2017.

=== Ottawa Fury ===
After 2 seasons with Montreal, Mkungilwa signed the Impact's new affiliate club, Ottawa Fury FC, in February 2017. He made his debut for Ottawa on April 17, 2017, against Charleston Battery. His second appearance for Ottawa occurred on May 6, 2017, against the Tampa Bay Rowdies. He would play in a friendly match against his former parent club the Montreal Impact on July 12, 2017. In total, he played in 4 matches.

== International career ==
Mkungilwa was selected to represent the Canadian U17 national team in the 2012 AGS Cup tournament. In late 2012, he was invited to the U17 national team training camp.

In 2013, Mkungilwa made one appearance for the Canadian U17 national team in the 2013 CONCACAF U-17 Championship. He was named to the squad for the 2013 FIFA U-17 World Cup. However, on October 17, he was ruled out after suffering an injury during pre-tournament camp.
