= Azake Luboyera =

Ugandan footballer (born 1998)

Personal information
- Date of birth: 6 April 1998 (age 28)
- Place of birth: Luweero, Uganda
- Height: 1.70 m (5 ft 7 in)
- Position: Forward

Youth career
- 2012: Hans Production Academy
- 2012–2014: Aspire Academy
- 2015–2016: Ottawa Fury

Senior career*
Years	Team	Apps	(Gls)
2016	Ottawa Fury Academy	13	(3)
2017–2018	Ottawa Fury	12	(1)

International career^{‡}
2016–	Uganda U20	2	(2)
- * Club domestic league appearances and goals as of 23 October 2018 ‡ National team caps and goals as of 20 July 2017

Azake Luboyera (born 6 April 1998) is a Ugandan footballer who plays as a forward.

== Playing career ==
=== Youth ===
Beginning his career at Hans Production Academy in Uganda, Luboyera later joined Aspire Academy in Qatar in 2012. After leaving Aspire in 2014, Luboyera joined the Ottawa Fury youth system in 2015.

=== Ottawa Fury ===
On 20 July 2017 Luboyera signed his first professional contract with the Ottawa Fury. He made his professional debut for Ottawa nine days later, scoring the opening goal in a 2–0 win over Toronto FC II.

== International career ==
Luboyera made two appearances for the Uganda under-20 national team in the 2017 Africa U-20 Cup of Nations qualifiers against Rwanda, scoring a brace in the second match.
