= Onua Obasi =

English footballer

Personal information
- Full name: Onua Thomas Obasi
- Date of birth: 24 September 1988 (age 38)
- Place of birth: Birmingham, England
- Position: Defender

Youth career
- 2010: Leigh Genesis
- 2010–2011: Cefn Druids

College career
Years	Team	Apps	(Gls)
2011–2012	Central Connecticut Blue Devils	37	(4)

Senior career*
Years	Team	Apps	(Gls)
2012	Western Mass Pioneers	1	(0)
2012–2013	CFC Azul	14	(1)
2014–2016	Baltimore Blast (indoor)	37	(18)
2014–2015	Rochester Rhinos	44	(1)
2016–2019	Ottawa Fury	95	(2)
2019–2022	Utica City (indoor)	22	(3)
2022	Ontario Fury (indoor)	5	(0)
2022–2023	Baltimore Blast (indoor)	12	(0)
2023–2024	Harrisburg Heat (indoor)	13	(2)

Managerial career
- 2023: Newtown Pride
- 2024–: Empire Strykers
- * Club domestic league appearances and goals

Onua Thomas Obasi (born 24 September 1988) is an English footballer and coach who is the head coach for the Empire Strykers in the Major Arena Soccer League. He is a versatile player who plays left back, centre back and defensive midfielder.

== Career ==
=== College and amateur ===
Obasi also played soccer for University of Liverpool from 2008–2011 before transferring to Central Connecticut State University. During his college years in England in 2010–2011, he played in the development leagues for Leigh Genesis in England and Cefn Druids in Wales. He was also part of the successful Bootle FC team that won the North West Counties 1st Division in 2008/09 (4 apps 1 Goal). He went on to make 36 appearances for Bootle in the 2009/10 season before moving to Leigh Genesis.

Obasi played two years of college soccer at Central Connecticut State University between 2011 and 2012. In 2011, Obasi started all 19 games for the Central Connecticut State University Blue Devils where he scored three goals and two assists. Obasi earned First-Team North Atlantic Region and Northeast Conference first team in both 2011 and 2012 He was selected to the New England College All-Star game. He also received All-American First Team honours in 2012.

While at college, Obasi also appeared for USL PDL clubs Western Mass Pioneers and Connecticut FC Azul in 2012 and again with CFC Azul after college in 2013.

=== Professional ===
Obasi signed his first professional deal with USL Pro club Rochester Rhinos on 30 January 2014. In the 2014 season, he played 24 games and scored 1 goal (against the Charlotte Eagles on 16 August 2014 in a 3–1 loss. On 14 May 2014, he also scored an over time game-winning goal against his former team, Western Mass Pioneers in the US Open Cup in a 2–1 win.

In the 2015 season, he played 20 games and had 4 assists. He started all 3 playoff games including the 2–1 victory in the USL Championship against Los Angeles Galaxy II. After the 2015 season, Obasi trialed with the Philadelphia Union in Major League Soccer.

Obasi played indoor soccer for the Baltimore Blast of the Major Arena Soccer League in the 2014–2015 season - playing 19 games, scoring 9 goals and 10 assists. He was named to the league's All-Rookie team.

Obasi returned to Baltimore for the 2015–2016 season, featuring in 18 of the Blast's 19 regular season games and all 6 of their playoff games. Obasi scored the opening goal in the championship final in which Baltimore beat Sonora 14–13; this was Baltimore's 8th indoor championship. Obasi received a 2015–16 MASL Honorable Mention alongside teammate Tony Donatelli.

In January 2016, Obasi signed with the Ottawa Fury.

Obasi returned to the Baltimore Blast on 25 August 2022.

=== International ===
Obasi began playing futsal in 2008 and it led to him being discovered for the England national futsall team. He was the leading goal scorer and was voted tournament MVP in the World University Futsal Championships while representing Great Britain. During the year he had 19 appearances and 4 goals.

=== Coaching ===
Obasi coached the Newtown Pride team that won the inaugural edition of The Soccer Tournament in 2023. In November 2024, Obasi was hired to coach the Empire Strykers of the Major Arena Soccer League.

== Honors ==
- United Soccer League
- USL Championship
  - Winner : 2015
- USL Regular Season
  - Winner: 2015
- USL Eastern Conference (Playoffs)
  - Winner: 2015
- USL Eastern Conference (Regular Season)
  - Winner: 2015
- Major Arena Soccer League
  - All Rookie Team: 2014-2015
- Major Arena Soccer League
  - Winner: 2015-2016
