= Shane McEleney =

Irish professional footballer (born 1991)

Personal information
- Date of birth: 31 January 1991 (age 35)
- Place of birth: Derry, Northern Ireland
- Position: Centre back

Team information
- Current team: Ballymena United
- Number: 24

Youth career
- Derry City

Senior career*
| Years | Team | Apps | (Gls) |
| 2009–2015 | Derry City | 183 | (4) |
| 2015–2016 | St Patrick's Athletic | 25 | (0) |
| 2017 | Ottawa Fury | 30 | (0) |
| 2018–2020 | Larne | 41 | (0) |
| 2020–2021 | Finn Harps | 45 | (0) |
| 2022–2024 | Derry City | 85 | (0) |
| 2025–2026 | Glentoran | 22 | (0) |
| 2026 | Ballymena United | 5 | (0) |

International career^{‡}
| 2010 | Republic of Ireland U19 | 5 | (0) |
| 2011 | Republic of Ireland U21 | 1 | (0) |

Managerial career
- 2026–: Finn Harps (interim assistant manager)
- * Club domestic league appearances and goals as of 29 July 2026 ‡ National team caps and goals as of 11 November 2016

Shane McEleney (born 31 January 1991) is an Irish former professional footballer who played as a centre back and a coach, currently interim assistant manager of League of Ireland First Division club Finn Harps.

== Playing career ==
=== Derry City ===
McEleney signed his first professional contract under manager Stephen Kenny in 2010. He won 3 trophies with his home town club alongside his brother Patrick McEleney.

=== Ottawa Fury ===
In December 2016, McEleney signed with Ottawa Fury FC in the United Soccer League.

=== Larne ===
McEleney joined Larne in January 2018 and helped the club to the 2018/19 Championship title, playing on the right of a back three.

=== Finn Harps ===
On 10 January 2020, McEleney made a return to the League of Ireland, signing for Finn Harps.

== Coaching career ==
On 29 July 2026, McEleney was named as interim assistant manager of League of Ireland First Division club Finn Harps until the end of the season, working under his brother Patrick who was appointed interim manager.

== Honours ==
Derry City

- League of Ireland First Division (1): 2010
- League of Ireland Cup (1): 2011
- FAI Cup (2): 2012, 2022
- President of Ireland's Cup: 2023

St Patrick's Athletic

- League of Ireland Cup (2): 2015, 2016

Larne

- NIFL Championship (1): 2018–19
