= Ramón Martín del Campo =

Mexican footballer (born 1993)

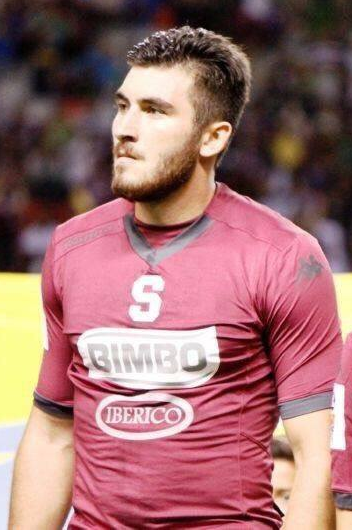
- Martin del Campo with Saprissa

Personal information
- Full name: Ramón Martín del Campo
- Date of birth: 5 July 1993 (age 33)
- Place of birth: Hermosillo, Mexico
- Height: 1.90 m (6 ft 3 in)
- Position: Defender

Youth career
- 2009–2011: FC San Diego

College career
| Years | Team | Apps | (Gls) |
| 2011–2014 | UC Davis | 70 | (3) |

Senior career*
| Years | Team | Apps | (Gls) |
| 2014 | San Jose Earthquakes U23 | 14 | (0) |
| 2015–2016 | Saprissa | 0 | (0) |
| 2016 | → Puerto Rico FC (loan) | 16 | (0) |
| 2017 | Ottawa Fury | 24 | (2) |
| 2018–2019 | Fresno FC | 53 | (2) |
| 2020 | Las Vegas Lights | 7 | (2) |
| 2020 | Oklahoma City Energy | 4 | (0) |
| 2021 | Miami FC | 3 | (0) |
- * Club domestic league appearances and goals as of 22 May 2021

Ramón Martín del Campo (born 5 July 1993) is a Mexican former professional footballer.

== Career ==
=== Early career ===
Prior to college, Martin del Campo started his soccer career playing for F.C. San Diego while also playing on the Bonita Vista High School varsity soccer team, which he helped lead to the CIF San Diego Section Division II Championship.

From 2011 to 2014, he went on to play four seasons of college soccer at the University of California, Davis. His strong performance was rewarded with a call to the United States National U23 Team (one of 19 players in the nation) for a week-long camp in the Bahamas in early August 2014. In the summer of 2014, he joined the San Jose Earthquakes' U23 Premier Development League squad, helping lead his side to a 7–4–3 record and a third-place finish in the Western Conference in its inaugural season. His performance that year led him to be one of three finalists for the PDL's Young Player of the Year Award.

=== Professional ===
Ramon Martin del Campo signed his first professional contract MLS prior to the 2015 MLS SuperDraft. He, however, went undrafted and his contract was subsequently voided. He later went on trial with LA Galaxy but was released in pre-season without a contract.

=== Deportivo Saprissa ===
In June 2015, he signed a two-year contract with Deportivo Saprissa after a recommendation by former MLS and Saprissa player Daniel Torres.

=== Puerto Rico FC ===
On May 12, 2016, Puerto Rico FC announced that Martin del Campo will join the club for this upcoming season on loan from Deportivo Saprissa.

=== Ottawa Fury ===
On January 10, 2017, Martin del Campo signed with United Soccer League side Ottawa Fury.

=== Fresno FC ===
On January 24, 2018, Martin del Campo signed with United Soccer League side Fresno FC for the 2018 season.

=== Las Vegas Lights ===
Following Fresno FC folding at the end of the 2019 season, del Campo signed with USL Championship side Las Vegas Lights FC on December 9, 2019, ahead of their 2020 season.

=== OKC Energy ===
On September 16, 2020, del Campo moved USL Championship side OKC Energy.

=== Miami FC ===
On January 7, 2021, USL Championship side Miami FC announced it had signed del Campo.

After playing every minute of Miami's first three matches, del Campo announced his retirement from professional soccer on May 22, 2021.
