= David Barrie =

Canadian soccer referee

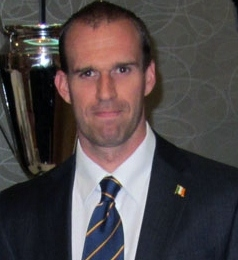
- Barrie in 2011
- Born: December 12, 1980 (age 45); Brampton, Ontario, Canada
- Height: 1.83 m (6 ft 0 in)

Domestic
Years	League	Role
2006–2012	CSL	Referee
2011–2017	NASL	Referee
2019–2023	CPL	Referee
2017-	MLS	VAR

David Barrie (born December 12, 1980) is a Canadian professional soccer referee, and is a member of the Professional Referee Organization. He officiates in Major League Soccer, USL Championship, and USL League One in the United States and in the Canadian Premier League in Canada.

== Career ==
Barrie began officiating at the youth level with the Bedfordshire FA, while he was in Luton, England with his family. In 2006, he was licensed by the Ontario Soccer Association, and began referring matches in the Canadian Soccer League (CSL) in 2009. In 2010, he was selected for the Canadian Soccer Association National List of Match Officials. In 2011, he was named the CSL Referee Year, and received the award once more the following year. In 2014, he officiated the CIS Championship final.

He made his North American Soccer League match official debut on May 1, 2011, in a match with FC Edmonton against Montreal Impact. In 2014, he began officiating matches in the Canadian Championship, and in the USL Championship in 2017. In 2017, he became involved in Major League Soccer as a fourth official. In 2019, he was assigned matches in the Canadian Premier League as a match official.

Barrie began working as a VAR in MLS in 2017. He worked his first MLS playoff match as a VAR in 2024 when the New York Red Bulls played the Columbus Crew. He was the VAR for the MLS All Star Game in 2026.
