= 2017 Puerto Rico FC season =

Puerto Rico FC
2017 season
- Owner: Carmelo Anthony
- President: Thomas Payne
- Head coach: Adrian Whitbread (until May 18); Marco Vélez (after May 18, interim)
- Stadium: Juan Ramón Loubriel Stadium
- NASL: Spring: 1-6-9 (8th); Fall: Combined:
- Top goalscorer: League: Conor Doyle (5); All: Conor Doyle (5)
- Highest home attendance: 5,692 (March 25 vs. New York Cosmos)
- Lowest home attendance: 2,345 (May 6 vs. Miami FC)
- Average home league attendance: 3,427
Home colors	Away colors	Third colors

The 2017 Puerto Rico FC season was the club's second season and first full season of existence. The club played in the North American Soccer League, the second tier of the American soccer pyramid.

== Season review ==
On January 23, the team announced the return of five regulars from the 2016 starting XI as well as a young prospect. Returning players were Trevor Spangenberg, Rudy Dawson, Cristiano Dias, Ramón Soria, Kyle Culbertson, and young goalkeeper Austin Pack.

On January 24, the team again announced the resigning of Michael Kafari, Tyler Rudy, Brian Bement, and Sidney Rivera for another run. The team also stated Bljedi Bardic will not return to the team as he has decided to stay in New York and take advantage of other career opportunities.

On January 26, CONCACAF announced PRFC will host group D in the 2017 CFU Club Championship at Juan Ramón Loubriel Stadium starting March 14. The club also announced the resigning of the three Puerto Rican footballers on the team for another season; Hector Ramos, Jorge Rivera, Joseph Marrero.

On January 30, the team announced two new signings for the 2017 season: Conor Doyle who last played for Colorado Rapids before being loaned to Colorado Springs Switchbacks in 2016, and Yuma who last played for Rayo OKC in 2016.

On February 10, the club announced the preparation for the 2017 NASL Season, as well as the Caribbean Club Championship, Puerto Rico FC will take part in the 7th Annual Bayamón City Cup which begins February 10 at the Bayamón Soccer Complex.

On March 2, the team announced 2 new additions to the team in defender Jake Stovall and goalkeeper Billy Thompson prior to the start of the CFU games.

On April 28, 4 weeks into the NASL spring season. Puerto Rico FC announced the signing of defender Phanuel Kavita, who spent the 2016 season with Real Salt Lake of Major League Soccer.

On July 15, Puerto Rico ended the Spring season in eighth place with nine points. Finishing out with a 1-6-9 record.

On July 25, the team announced a new signing of Spanish veteran attacking midfielder Mario, prior to the start of the Fall season.

On October 1, PRFC took to the field for the first time since the devastation on Hurricane Maria against the Cosmos in MCU Park.

== Roster ==
As of match played 22 August 2017

No.	Name	Nationality	Position	Date of birth (age)	Signed from	Signed in	Contract ends	Apps.	Goals
Goalkeepers
1	Austin Pack	(United States)	GK	25 February 1994 (age 32)	Unattached	2016		6	0
13	Billy Thompson	(United States)	GK	22 October 1990 (age 36)	Colorado Springs Switchbacks	2017		0	0
18	Trevor Spangenberg	(United States)	GK	21 April 1991 (age 35)	New England Revolution	2016		24	0
Defenders
2	Cristiano	(Brazil)	DF	25 May 1986 (age 40)	Minnesota United FC	2016		35	2
3	Kyle Culbertson	(United States)	DF	16 November 1992 (age 33)	Unattached	2016		29	1
4	Rudy Dawson	(Costa Rica)	DF	8 May 1988 (age 38)	(Costa Rica) Uruguay	2016		33	1
5	Ramón Soria	(Spain)	DF	9 March 1989 (age 37)	(Slovenia) Celje	2016		38	1
15	Jacob Stovall	(United States)	DF	10 January 1994 (age 32)	Seattle Sounders FC	2017		1	0
22	Seth Moses	(United States)	DF	2 August 1993 (age 33)	(South Korea) Anyang	2017		6	0
27	Phanuel Kavita	(Democratic Republic of the Congo)	DF	9 March 1993 (age 33)	Real Salt Lake	2017		10	0
Midfielders
6	Jordi Quintillà	(Spain)	MF	25 October 1993 (age 33)	Sporting Kansas City	2017		14	1
7	Mario	(Spain)	MF	25 March 1985 (age 41)	(Greece) PGS Kissamikos F.C	2017		1	0
10	Joseph Marrero	(Puerto Rico)	MF	9 April 1993 (age 33)	(Puerto Rico) Criollos de Caguas	2016		24	1
14	Brian Bement	(United States)	MF	7 February 1993 (age 33)	(United States) Loyola University	2016		14	1
17	Jairo Puerto	(Honduras)	MF	28 December 1988 (age 37)	Honduras Progreso	2017		11	3
19	Jorge Rivera	(Puerto Rico)	MF	24 March 1996 (age 30)	(Puerto Rico) Guayama	2016		12	0
20	Walter Ramírez	(Honduras)	MF	7 November 1983 (age 43)	Tampa Bay Rowdies	2017		16	1
21	Michael Kafari	(Ghana)	MF	8 August 1989 (age 37)	Unattached	2016		28	0
24	Yuma	(Spain)	MF	8 October 1985 (age 41)	Rayo OKC	2017		14	0
29	Tyler Rudy	(United States)	MF	29 September 1993 (age 33)	New England Revolution	2016	2017 - Retired	25	2
Forwards
8	Conor Doyle	(United States)	FW	13 October 1991 (age 35)	Colorado Rapids	2017		20	4
9	Héctor Ramos	(Puerto Rico)	FW	4 May 1990 (age 36)	(El Salvador) Águila	2016		33	12
11	Giuseppe Gentile	(United States)	FW	18 October 1992 (age 34)	(Canada) Ottawa Fury	2017		15	2
12	Emery Welshman	(Guyana)	FW	9 November 1991 (age 34)	Real Salt Lake	2017		10	2
16	Mike Ramos	(Puerto Rico)	FW	29 January 1991 (age 35)	Kitsap Pumas	2017		5	1
23	Sidney Rivera	(United States)	FW	15 November 1993 (age 32)	Orlando City SC	2016		27	4

== Transfers ==
=== In ===
Date	Position	Nationality	Name	From	Fee	Ref.
January 30	FW	(United States)	Conor Doyle	Colorado Rapids	Undisclosed	
January 30	MF	(Spain)	Yuma	Rayo OKC	Undisclosed	
January 31	FW	(United States)	Giuseppe Gentile	Ottawa Fury	Undisclosed	
February 3	MF	(Honduras)	Walter Ramírez	Tampa Bay Rowdies	Undisclosed	
February 9	MF	(Spain)	Jordi Quintillà	Sporting Kansas City	Undisclosed	
February 15	DF	(United States)	Seth Moses	(South Korea) FC Anyang	Undisclosed	
February 24	FW	(Honduras)	Jairo Puerto	Honduras Progreso	Undisclosed	
March 2	DF	(United States)	Jake Stovall	Seattle Sounders	Undisclosed	
March 2	GK	(United States)	Billy Thompson	Colorado Springs Switchbacks FC	Undisclosed	
March 7	FW	(Puerto Rico)	Mike Ramos	Kitsap Pumas	Undisclosed	
April 1	FW	(Guyana)	Emery Welshman	Real Salt Lake	Undisclosed	
April 28	DF	(Democratic Republic of the Congo)	Phanuel Kavita	Real Salt Lake	Undisclosed	
July 25	MF	(Spain)	Mario	(Greece) PGS Kissamikos F.C	Undisclosed	

=== Out ===
Date	Position	Nationality	Name	To	Fee	Ref.
21 November 2016	MF	(United States)	Connor Agnew		Undisclosed	
21 November 2016	MF	(Ghana)	Evans Frimpong		Undisclosed	
21 November 2016	FW	(Mexico)	David Eduardo López		Undisclosed	
21 November 2016	GK	(United States)	David Meves		Undisclosed	
21 November 2016	FW	(Brazil)	Pedro		Undisclosed	
21 November 2016	MF	(Guyana)	Chris Nurse	(England) Sutton United F.C.	Undisclosed	
23 December 2016	MF	(Brazil)	Oliver	Richmond Kickers	Undisclosed	
10 January 2017	DF	(United States)	Ramon Martin Del Campo	Ottawa Fury	Undisclosed	
24 January 2017	FW	(Montenegro)	Bljedi Bardic	New York Cosmos B	Undisclosed	

=== On loan ===
Note: Flags indicate national team as defined under FIFA eligibility rules; some limited exceptions apply. Players may hold more than one non-FIFA nationality.

No. / Pos. / Nation / Player; 13 / GK / USA / Billy Thompson (at (Puerto Rico) Bayamon FC for the season)	No. / Pos. / Nation / Player

== Preseason ==
Win Draw Loss Upcoming fixture

=== 2017 Bayamón Cup ===
February 10, 2017 Group stage	Puerto Rico	7–0	Leal Arecibo FC	Bayamón
	H.Ramos; Doyle; Gentile; S. Rivera; Bement	Report		Stadium: Bayamón Soccer Complex

February 19, 2017 Group stage	Puerto Rico	4–0	Metropolitan FA	Bayamón
	Gentile; H.Ramos; S. Rivera; Bement	Report		Stadium: Bayamón Soccer Complex

February 24, 2017 Group stage	CD Barbosa	0–4	Puerto Rico	Bayamón
			Culbertson; Marrero; Welshman; H.Ramos	Stadium: Bayamón Soccer Complex

March 3, 2017 Group Stage	Fraigcomar	0–8	Puerto Rico	Bayamón
			Quintillà; Doyle; H.Ramos; Marrero; Bement; Kafari	Stadium: Bayamón Soccer Complex

March 8, 2017 Semifinals	Puerto Rico	9–0	Universidad del Turabo	Bayamón
	H.Ramos; Rivera; Bement; Gentile			Stadium: Bayamón Soccer Complex 2

March 11, 2017 Finals	Bayamon	1–1	Puerto Rico	Bayamón
	Goal		Rivera 15'	Stadium: Bayamón Soccer Complex

=== Friendlies ===
February 28, 2017 Friendly	Puerto Rico	Cancelled	(Puerto Rico) Criollos FC	Bayamón

== Competitions ==
=== CFU Club Championship ===
==== Group stage ====
Pos	Team	Pld	W	D	L	GF	GA	GD	Pts	Qualification
1	(Jamaica) Portmore United (A)	3	3	0	0	9	1	+8	9	Final round
2	Puerto Rico FC (H, E)	3	2	0	1	5	1	+4	6	
3	(Suriname) Transvaal (E)	3	1	0	2	5	7	−2	3	
4	(Cayman Islands) Scholars International (E)	3	0	0	3	0	10	−10	0	

Source: CFU
(A) Advance to a further round; (E) Eliminated; (H) Hosts

March 14, 2017 1	Puerto Rico	1–0	(Suriname) Transvaal	Bayamón, Puerto Rico
	H.Ramos 28' (pen.); Culbertson (yellow card) 36'; Kafari (yellow card) 44'; Rudy (yellow card) 73'	Report	F.Felix (yellow card) 23'; C.Doorson (yellow card) 26'; E.Tjon A Loi (yellow card) 89'	Stadium: Juan Ramón Loubriel Stadium

March 16, 2017 2	Puerto Rico	0–1	(Jamaica) Portmore United	Bayamón, Puerto Rico
	Yuma (yellow card) 41'; Culbertson (yellow card) 48'; Quintillà (yellow card) 81'	Report	Stewart (yellow card) 9'; K.Manning (yellow card) 81'; Morris 88'	Stadium: Juan Ramón Loubriel Stadium

March 18, 2017 3	Puerto Rico	4–0	(Cayman Islands) Scholars International	Bayamón, Puerto Rico
	M.Ramos 13'; Rivera 34'; Bement 50'; Cristiano 55'	Report	J.Escobar (yellow card) 81'	Stadium: Juan Ramón Loubriel Stadium

=== NASL Spring season ===
==== Standings ====
Pos	Team	Pld	W	D	L	GF	GA	GD	Pts	Qualification
1	Miami FC (S)	16	11	3	2	33	11	+22	36	Playoffs
2	San Francisco Deltas	16	7	5	4	17	20	−3	26	
3	New York Cosmos	16	6	6	4	22	21	+1	24	
4	Jacksonville Armada	16	6	6	4	17	16	+1	24	
5	North Carolina FC	16	6	3	7	21	22	−1	21	
6	Indy Eleven	16	4	8	4	21	22	−1	20	
7	FC Edmonton	16	4	1	11	11	21	−10	13	
8	Puerto Rico FC	16	1	6	9	19	28	−9	9	

Source: NASL
Rules for classification: 1) points; 2) total goal differential; 3) total goals scored; 4) head-to-head record; 5) away goal differential; 6) away goals scored
(S) Spring season champion

==== Results summary ====
Overall								Home						Away					
Pld	W	D	L	GF	GA	GD	Pts	W	D	L	GF	GA	GD	W	D	L	GF	GA	GD
16	1	6	9	19	28	−9	9	1	3	4	7	9	−2	0	3	5	12	19	−7

Last updated: 21 July 2017.
Source: NASL

==== Results by round ====
Round	1	2	3	4	5	6	7	8	9	10	11	12	13	14	15	16
Stadium	H	A	H	A	H	H	A	H	A	H	H	A	A	A	H	A
Result	D	D	D	L	L	L	L	L	D	W	L	L	L	D	D	L
Position	5	4	6	7	7	8	8	8	8	6	7	8	8	8	8	8

Updated to match(es) played on 21 July 2017. Source: NASL
A = Away; H = Home; W = Win; D = Draw; L = Loss

==== Matches ====
25 March 2017 1	Puerto Rico	0–0	New York Cosmos	Bayamón
19:30 AST		Report		Stadium: Juan Ramón Loubriel Stadium; Attendance: 5,692; Referee: Kevin Morrison

1 April 2017 2	Indy Eleven	3–3	Puerto Rico	Indianapolis
15:00 AST	Braun 5', 75'; Speas 10'; Thompson (yellow card) 44'; Busch (yellow card) 55'	Report	Doyle 24'; H.Ramos 45+1'; Ramírez 56' (pen.)	Stadium: Michael A. Carroll Stadium; Attendance: 9,064; Referee: Luis Guardia

8 April 2017 3	Puerto Rico	1–1	Indy Eleven	Bayamón
19:30 AST	H.Ramos 19'	Report	Zayed 45+3' (yellow card) 49'	Stadium: Juan Ramón Loubriel Stadium; Attendance: 3,933; Referee: Javier Santos

22 April 2017 4	Edmonton	2–1	Puerto Rico	Edmonton
21:00 AST	Corea 61'; Shiels 70'	Report	Doyle (yellow card) 57'; Cristiano (yellow card) 62'; Quintillà 90+3'	Stadium: Clarke Stadium; Attendance: 3,582; Referee: Yursi Rudolf

29 April 2017 5	Puerto Rico	0–1	North Carolina	Bayamón
19:30 AST	Kafari (yellow card) 65'	Report	Miller 28'; Albadawi (yellow card) 47'	Stadium: Juan Ramón Loubriel Stadium; Attendance: 2,846; Referee: William Anderson

6 May 2017 6	Puerto Rico	1–2	Miami	Bayamón
19:30 AST	Welshman 24'; Gentile (yellow card) 50'	Report	Rennella 82'; Chavez 90+4'	Stadium: Juan Ramón Loubriel Stadium; Attendance: 2,345; Referee: Jeffrey Solis

14 May 2017 7	New York Cosmos	4–3	Puerto Rico	Miami
19:00 AST	Richter (yellow card) 24' (goal) 50'; Flores 42'; Guerra 45+2'; Restrepo 58'; Márquez (yellow card) 80'	Report	Gentile 15'; Welshman 16'; Yuma (red card) 35'; Cristiano 64' (pen.); Kavita (yellow card) 80'	Stadium: Riccardo Silva Stadium; Attendance: 5,735; Referee: Ramy Touchan

20 May 2017 8	Puerto Rico	1–2	North Carolina	Bayamón
19:30 AST	Dawson 27'; Soria (yellow card) 55'	Report	Moses (yellow card) 51'; Fondy 73'; Miller (yellow card) 89'; Schuler 90+1'	Stadium: Juan Ramón Loubriel Stadium; Attendance: 2,367; Referee: Danion Parchment

27 May 2017 9	Miami	1–1	Puerto Rico	Miami
19:30 AST	Kcira (yellow card) 35'; Rennella 51'	Report	Dawson (yellow card) 57'; Soria 65'; Pack (yellow card) 90+2'	Stadium: Riccardo Silva Stadium; Attendance: 6,115; Referee: Rubiel Vazquez

3 June 2017 10	Puerto Rico	3–0	Edmonton	Bayamón
19:30 AST	Gentile 25' (yellow card) 26'; H.Ramos 28'; Doyle (yellow card) 38'; Puerto 52'	Report	Sansara (yellow card) 32'; Smith (yellow card) 55'; Diakité (yellow card) 61'; Khattab (yellow card) 87'; Watson (yellow card) 90+1'	Stadium: Juan Ramón Loubriel Stadium; Attendance: 3,078; Referee: Javier Santos

10 June 2017 11	Puerto Rico	1–3	San Francisco Deltas	Bayamón
19:30 AST	Welshman (yellow card) 62'; Puerto 65'	http://www.nasl.com/match-center/1435/prfc-vs-sfd NASL	Teijsse 17' (yellow card) 49'; Jackson (yellow card) 24'; Bekker 31', 69'; Reiner (yellow card) 38'	Stadium: Juan Ramón Loubriel Stadium; Attendance: 4,679; Referee: Sandy Vasquez

16 June 2017 12	New York Cosmos	4–2	Puerto Rico	Brooklyn
19:30 AST	Ayoze 13'; Márquez (yellow card) 60'; Ledesma 69'; Restrepo 74'; Vranjicán 90+4'	Report	Soria (yellow card) 12'; Puerto 17'; Doyle 24' (yellow card) 26'; Gentile (yellow card) 39'; Quintillà (yellow card) 43'; Dawson (red card) 81'; Culbertson (yellow card) 90+1'	Stadium: MCU Park; Attendance: 4,927; Referee: David Gantar

2 July 2017 13	San Francisco Deltas	2–0	Puerto Rico	San Francisco
20:30 AST	Heinemann 24', 67'; Burke (yellow card) 32'; Portilla (yellow card) 47'; Gibson (yellow card) 73'	Report	Cristiano (yellow card) 82'; Ramírez (yellow card) 90+3'; Rivera (yellow card) 90+4'	Stadium: Kezar Stadium; Attendance: 1,915; Referee: Joe Dickerson

8 July 2017 14	Puerto Rico	0–0	Jacksonville Armada	Bayamón
19:30 AST		Report		Stadium: Juan Ramón Loubriel Stadium; Attendance: 2,876; Referee: William Anderson

12 July 2017 15	Jacksonville Armada	1–1	Puerto Rico	Jacksonville
8:00 EST	Ryden (yellow card) 78'; Gebhard 90+2'	Report	Beckie 39' (o.g.); Gentile (yellow card) 42'; Quintillà (yellow card) 75'	Stadium: Hodges Stadium; Attendance: 2,153; Referee: Bardhyl Pashaj

15 July 2017 16	North Carolina	2-1	Puerto Rico	Cary
	Laing 17'; Miller (yellow card) 71'; J.Carranza (yellow card) 83'; Fondy 90+2' (pen.)	Report	Welshman (yellow card) 31'; Cristiano (yellow card) 65'; Kavita 84'; Spangenberg (yellow card) 90+2'	Stadium: WakeMed Soccer Park; Attendance: 4.227; Referee: Nima Saghafi

=== NASL Fall season ===
==== Standings ====
Pos	Team	Pld	W	D	L	GF	GA	GD	Pts	Qualification
1	Miami FC (F)	16	10	3	3	28	17	+11	33	Playoffs
2	San Francisco Deltas	16	7	7	2	24	15	+9	28	
3	North Carolina FC	16	5	9	2	25	15	+10	24	
4	New York Cosmos	16	4	9	3	34	30	+4	21	
5	Jacksonville Armada	16	4	7	5	21	22	−1	19	
6	Puerto Rico FC	16	4	4	8	13	23	−10	16	
7	FC Edmonton	16	3	5	8	14	21	−7	14	
8	Indy Eleven	16	3	4	9	18	34	−16	13	

Source: NASL
Rules for classification: 1) points; 2) total goal differential; 3) total goals scored; 4) head-to-head record; 5) away goal differential; 6) away goals scored
(F) Fall season champion

==== Results summary ====
Overall								Home						Away					
Pld	W	D	L	GF	GA	GD	Pts	W	D	L	GF	GA	GD	W	D	L	GF	GA	GD
6	2	3	1	5	5	0	9	1	1	1	1	2	−1	1	2	0	4	3	+1

Source: NASL

==== Results by round ====
Round	1	2	3	4	5	6	7	8	9	10	11	12	13	14	15	16
Stadium	A	H	H	A	A	H	A	H	A	H	A	H	H	A	H	A
Result	D	W	D	W	D	L	L	D	-							
Position	5	3	3	1	1	2	2	4	-							

Source: NASL
A = Away; H = Home; W = Win; D = Draw; L = Loss

==== Matches ====
July 29, 2017 17	North Carolina FC	1–1	Puerto Rico	Cary
7:30 ET	Fondy 90+1'	Report	Quintillà 13'	Stadium: WakeMed Soccer Park; Attendance: 4,166; Referee: Timothy Ford

August 5, 2017 18	Puerto Rico	1–0	Jacksonville Armada	Bayamón
7:30 PM	Doyle 43'	Report		Stadium: Juan Ramón Loubriel Stadium; Attendance: Javier Santos; Referee: 3,382

August 12, 2017 19	Puerto Rico	0–0	San Francisco Deltas	Bayamón
7:30 PM		Report		Stadium: Juan Ramón Loubriel Stadium; Attendance: 3,069; Referee: Daneion Parchment

August 16, 2017 20	Jacksonville Armada	1–2	Puerto Rico	Jacksonville
6:30 PM	Taylor 62'	Report	Doyle 54'; Gentile 75'	Stadium: Hodges Stadium; Attendance: 780; Referee: Farhad Dadkho

August 20, 2017 21	FC Edmonton	1–1	Puerto Rico	Edmonton
4:00 PM	Fisk 45'	Report	Doyle 54'	Stadium: Clarke Stadium; Attendance: 3,414; Referee: Carol Anne Chenard

26 August 2017 22	Puerto Rico	0–2	Miami FC	Bayamón
19:30 EDT		Report	Michel (yellow card) 30'; Chavez 34'; Martínez 90+3'	Stadium: Juan Ramón Loubriel Stadium; Attendance: 3,144; Referee: Kimbett Ward

September 2, 2017 23	Miami FC	1–0	Puerto Rico	Miami
19:30 EDT	Chavez (yellow card) 43', (goal) 74'; Martínez (yellow card) 59'	Report	Yuma (yellow card) 35'; Gentile (yellow card) 56'; Rivera (yellow card) 69'	Stadium: Riccardo Silva Stadium; Attendance: 4,211; Referee: Rubiel Vazquez

September 9, 2017 24	Puerto Rico	v	New York Cosmos	Bayamón
7:30 PM				Stadium: Juan Ramón Loubriel Stadium

September 16, 2017 25	North Carolina FC	0–0	Puerto Rico	Cary
TBD		Report		Stadium: WakeMed Soccer Park; Attendance: 5,072; Referee: Juan Guzman Jr.

September 20, 2017 26	Puerto Rico	v	FC Edmonton	Bayamón
7:30 PM				Stadium: Juan Ramón Loubriel Stadium

September 23, 2017 27	Indy Eleven	v	Puerto Rico	Indianapolis
7:30 PM				Stadium: Michael A. Carroll Stadium

October 1, 2017 28	New York Cosmos	1–0	Puerto Rico	Brooklyn, New York
17:00 EDT UTC−4	Mendes (yellow card) 13'; Mulligan (yellow card) 58'; Márquez 73'; Ayoze (yellow card) 80'; Jakovic (yellow card) 82'; Maurer (yellow card) 90+2'	Report	Puerto (yellow card) 49'; Martínez (yellow card) 54'; Gentile (yellow card) 77'; Ramírez (red card) 90+4'	Stadium: MCU Park; Attendance: 3,733; Referee: Henrik Karlsson
Note: Match was originally scheduled to be played at Juan Ramón Loubriel Stadium in Bayamón but was moved due to destruction caused by Hurricane Maria.

October 4, 2017 29	Indy Eleven	2–1	Puerto Rico	Indianapolis
17:00 EDT UTC−4	Zayed 37', 62'	Report	Gentile 88' (pen.)	Stadium: Michael A. Carroll Stadium; Attendance: 8,272; Referee: Jon Freemon

October 7, 2017 30	Puerto Rico	0–1	North Carolina FC	Cary
7:30 PM		Report	Miller 23'	Stadium: WakeMed Soccer Park; Referee: Bardhyl Pashaj
Note: Match was originally scheduled to be played at Juan Ramón Loubriel Stadium in Bayamón but was moved due to destruction caused by Hurricane Maria.

October 14, 2017 31	San Francisco Deltas	3–0	Puerto Rico	San Francisco
7:00 PM	Burke 7', 45'; Dyego 47'	Report		Stadium: Kezar Stadium; Attendance: 2,402; Referee: Juan Guzman, Jr

October 18, 2017 32	Puerto Rico	1–4	New York Cosmos	Lauderhill, Florida
19:30 EDT UTC−4	Kafari (yellow card) 74'; Rivera 89'	Report	Ayoze 35', 84' (pen.); Starikov 41'; Bardic 74'	Stadium: Central Broward Regional Park; Referee: Luis Guardia
Note: Match was originally scheduled to be played at Juan Ramón Loubriel Stadium in Bayamón but was moved due to destruction caused by Hurricane Maria.

October 21, 2017 33	Puerto Rico	2–1	Indy Eleven	Indianapolis
7:30 PM	S. Rivera 5'; Welshman 43'	Report	Goldsmith 82'	Stadium: Michael A. Carroll Stadium; Attendance: 3,421; Referee: Rosendo Mendoza
Note: Match was originally scheduled to be played at Juan Ramón Loubriel Stadium in Bayamón but was moved due to destruction caused by Hurricane Maria.

October 25, 2017 34	Puerto Rico	2–0	FC Edmonton	Kissimmee, Florida
7:30 PM	Quintillà 6'; Ramos 16'	Report		Stadium: Austin-Tindall Regional Park; Referee: Geoff Gamble
Note: Match was originally scheduled to be played at Juan Ramón Loubriel Stadium in Bayamón but was moved due to destruction caused by Hurricane Maria.

October 28, 2017 35	New York Cosmos	5–2	Puerto Rico	Brooklyn, New York
7:00 PM	Ledesma 51', 56', 67'; Mendes 75'; Mkosana 90+5'	Report	Welshman 48', 84'; Soria (yellow card) 89'	Stadium: MCU Park; Attendance: 5,929; Referee: Malik Badawi

== Squad statistics ==
As of match played August 31, 2017

=== Appearances and goals ===
No.	Pos	Nat	Player	Total		NASL Spring Season		NASL Fall Season		CFU Club Championship	
No.	Pos	Nat	Player	Apps	Goals	Apps	Goals	Apps	Goals	Apps	Goals
1	GK	(United States) USA	Austin Pack	6	0	5	0	0	0	1	0
2	DF	(Brazil) BRA	Cristiano	18	2	12+1	1	0+2	0	2+1	1
3	DF	(United States) USA	Kyle Culbertson	16	0	9+4	0	0+1	0	2	0
4	DF	(Costa Rica) CRC	Rudy Dawson	15	1	11	1	2	0	2	0
5	DF	(Spain) ESP	Ramón Soria	23	1	14+2	1	4+1	0	2	0
6	MF	(Spain) ESP	Jordi Quintillà	21	2	11+1	1	6	1	2+1	0
7	MF	(Spain) ESP	Mario	2	0	0	0	1+1	0	0	0
8	FW	(United States) USA	Conor Doyle	23	5	14+1	2	6	3	2	0
9	FW	(Puerto Rico) PUR	Héctor Ramos	18	4	7+4	3	5	0	2	1
10	MF	(Puerto Rico) PUR	Joseph Marrero	9	0	1+4	0	0+1	0	0+3	0
11	FW	(United States) USA	Giuseppe Gentile	22	3	10+3	2	7	1	2	0
12	MF	(Guyana) GUY	Emery Welshman	15	2	6+4	2	2+3	0	0	0
14	MF	(United States) USA	Brian Bement	2	1	0	0	1	0	1	1
15	DF	(United States) USA	Jacob Stovall	1	0	0	0	0	0	1	0
16	FW	(Puerto Rico) PUR	Mike Ramos	5	1	2+2	0	0	0	1	1
17	MF	(Honduras) HON	Jairo Puerto	18	3	8+3	3	7	0	0	0
18	GK	(United States) USA	Trevor Spangenberg	20	0	11	0	7	0	2	0
19	MF	(Puerto Rico) PUR	Jorge Rivera	8	0	1+1	0	1+5	0	0	0
20	MF	(Honduras) HON	Walter Ramírez	23	1	10+4	1	7	0	2	0
21	MF	(Ghana) GHA	Michael Kafari	15	0	10+2	0	+1	0	2	0
22	DF	(United States) USA	Seth Moses	12	0	3+2	0	6	0	1	0
23	FW	(United States) USA	Sidney Rivera	16	1	3+8	0	+3	0	1+1	1
24	MF	(Spain) ESP	Yuma	20	0	10	0	7	0	3	0
27	DF	(Democratic Republic of the Congo) COD	Phanuel Kavita	17	1	8+2	1	7	0	0	0
29	MF	(United States) USA	Tyler Rudy^{RET}	4	0	2	0	0	0	2	0
Players who left Puerto Rico during the season:

=== Top scorers ===
Place	Position	Nation	Number	Name	NASL Spring Season	NASL Fall Season	CFU Club Championship	Total
1	FW	(United States)	8	Conor Doyle	2	3	0	5
2	FW	(Puerto Rico)	9	Héctor Ramos	3	0	1	4
3	FW	(United States)	11	Giuseppe Gentile	2	1	0	3
3	MF	(Honduras)	17	Jairo Puerto	3	0	0	3
4	MF	(Spain)	6	Jordi Quintillà	1	1	0	2
4	MF	(Guyana)	12	Emery Welshman	2	0	0	2
4	DF	(Brazil)	2	Cristiano	1	0	1	2
7	MF	(Honduras)	20	Walter Ramírez	1	0	0	1
7	DF	(Costa Rica)	4	Rudy Dawson	1	0	0	1
7	DF	(Spain)	5	Ramón Soria	1	0	0	1
7	FW	(Puerto Rico)	16	Mike Ramos	0	0	1	1
7	FW	(United States)	23	Sidney Rivera	0	0	1	1
7	MF	(United States)	14	Brian Bement	0	0	1	1
7				Own goal	1	0	0	1
TOTALS					22	0	5	27

=== Disciplinary record ===
- Needs to be updated.

Number	Nation	Position	Name	NASL Spring season		NASL Fall season		CFU Club Championship		Total	
Number	Nation	Position	Name	Yellow card	Red card	Yellow card	Red card	Yellow card	Red card	Yellow card	Red card
1	(United States)	GK	Austin Pack	1	0	0	0	0	0	1	0
2	(Brazil)	DF	Cristiano	2	0	0	0	0	0	2	0
3	(United States)	DF	Kyle Culbertson	1	0	0	0	2	0	3	0
4	(Costa Rica)	DF	Rudy Dawson	1	1	0	0	0	0	1	1
5	(Spain)	DF	Ramón Soria	2	0	0	0	0	0	2	0
6	(Spain)	MF	Jordi Quintillà	2	0	0	0	1	0	3	0
8	(United States)	FW	Conor Doyle	3	0	0	0	0	0	3	0
11	(United States)	FW	Giuseppe Gentile	4	0	0	0	0	0	4	0
12	(Guyana)	FW	Emery Welshman	1	0	0	0	0	0	1	0
20	(Honduras)	MF	Walter Ramírez	1	0	0	0	0	0	1	0
21	(Ghana)	MF	Michael Kafari	1	0	0	0	1	0	2	0
23	(United States)	FW	Sidney Rivera	1	0	0	0	0	0	1	0
24	(Spain)	MF	Yuma	0	1	0	0	1	0	1	1
27	(Democratic Republic of the Congo)	DF	Phanuel Kavita	1	0	0	0	0	0	1	0
29	(United States)	MF	Tyler Rudy	0	0	0	0	1	0	1	0
			TOTALS	21	2	0	0	6	0	27	2
