= List of North American Soccer League transfers 2016 =

This is a list of soccer transfers for the 2016 North American Soccer League season.

This list includes all transfers made after clubs played their last match of the 2015 NASL season and before they played their last match of the 2016 NASL season.

== Transfers ==
All clubs without a flag are members of the North American Soccer League.

Date	Name	Moving from	Moving to	Fee
November 26, 2015	(United States) Jake Keegan	(Republic of Ireland) Galway United	FC Edmonton	Free
December 3, 2015	(Brazil) Stefano Pinho	(Brazil) Fluminense	Minnesota United FC	Free
December 7, 2015	(United States) Mitch Hildebrandt	Minnesota United FC	(United States) FC Cincinnati	Free
December 7, 2015	(United States) Steven Miller	(United States) Tulsa Roughnecks	Carolina RailHawks	Undisclosed
December 7, 2015	(United States) Tyler Polak	Minnesota United FC	(United States) FC Cincinnati	Free
December 7, 2015	(United States) Andrew Wiedeman	Ottawa Fury	(United States) FC Cincinnati	Free
December 8, 2015	(Trinidad and Tobago) Kareem Moses	FC Edmonton	Carolina RailHawks	Free
December 10, 2015	(Honduras) Wilson Palacios	Unattached	Miami FC	Free
December 10, 2015	(Jamaica) Dane Richards	(United States) New York Red Bulls	Miami FC	Free
December 14, 2015	(United States) Tom Heinemann	Ottawa Fury	Tampa Bay Rowdies	Free
December 15, 2015	(Venezuela) Robert Hernández	Tampa Bay Rowdies	(Venezuela) Caracas	Free
December 15, 2015	(Jamaica) Lance Laing	FC Edmonton	Minnesota United FC	Free
December 15, 2015	(Republic of Ireland) Richie Ryan	Ottawa Fury	Jacksonville Armada	Undisclosed
December 15, 2015	(United States) Brad Rusin	San Antonio Scorpions	Miami FC	Free
December 15, 2015	(United States) Blake Smith	(Switzerland) Yverdon Sport	Miami FC	Free
December 15, 2015	(Bosnia and Herzegovina) Siniša Ubiparipović	Ottawa Fury	Indy Eleven	Undisclosed
December 16, 2015	(United States) Alex Dixon	(United States) Rochester Rhinos	Jacksonville Armada	Free
December 16, 2015	(United States) Kris Tyrpak	San Antonio Scorpions	(United States) Swope Park Rangers	Free
December 17, 2015	(Ghana) Khalif Alhassan	Minnesota United FC	Tampa Bay Rowdies	Free
December 17, 2015	(Canada) Drew Beckie	Ottawa Fury	Carolina RailHawks	Free
December 17, 2015	(United States) Beto Navarro	(United States) Orange County Blues	Jacksonville Armada	Free
December 17, 2015	(Mexico) Alejandro Vela	Minnesota United FC	(Mexico) Necaxa	Free
December 18, 2015	(Wales) Danny Barrow	(England) Truro City	Jacksonville Armada	Free
December 18, 2015	(Jamaica) Dennis Chin	(United States) Arizona United	Ottawa Fury	Free
December 18, 2015	(United States) Lance Rozeboom	(United States) Austin Aztex	Ottawa Fury	Free
December 18, 2015	(Brazil) Fernando Timbó	(United States) Austin Aztex	Ottawa Fury	Free
December 21, 2015	(Argentina) Darío Cvitanich	Unattached	Miami FC	Free
December 21, 2015	(Finland) Pekka Lagerblom	(Finland) Lahti	Jacksonville Armada	Free
December 21, 2015	(United States) Frank Sanfilippo	Fort Lauderdale Strikers	Tampa Bay Rowdies	Free
December 22, 2015	(United States) Ryan Richter	Ottawa Fury	(United States) Bethlehem Steel	Undisclosed
December 22, 2015	(United States) Tyler Ruthven	(United States) Arizona United	Jacksonville Armada	Free
December 23, 2015	(United States) Neil Shaffer	(United States) Harrisburg City Islanders	Indy Eleven	Free
December 23, 2015	(Spain) David Sierra	Jacksonville Armada	Miami FC	Free
December 23, 2015	(Libya) Éamon Zayed	(Malaysia) Sabah	Indy Eleven	Free
December 24, 2015	(Honduras) Walter Ramírez	Fort Lauderdale Strikers	Tampa Bay Rowdies	Free
December 26, 2015	(Colombia) Jaime Castrillón	Jacksonville Armada	(Colombia) Atlético Bucaramanga	Free
December 28, 2015	(United States) Bryan Burke	(United States) Louisville City	Jacksonville Armada	Free
December 28, 2015	(Brazil) Geison Moura	Minnesota United FC	Fort Lauderdale Strikers	Free
December 28, 2015	(Democratic Republic of the Congo) Danny Mwanga	(United States) Orlando City SC	Tampa Bay Rowdies	Free
December 28, 2015	(United States) Victor Pineda	Indy Eleven	Fort Lauderdale Strikers	Free
December 28, 2015	(Peru) Aurelio Saco Vértiz	(Peru) Cienciano	Fort Lauderdale Strikers	Free
December 28, 2015	(Colombia) Luis Zapata	Unattached	Fort Lauderdale Strikers	Free
December 29, 2015	(United States) Gale Agbossoumonde	Tampa Bay Rowdies	Fort Lauderdale Strikers	Free
December 29, 2015	(Canada) Nana Attakora	San Antonio Scorpions	Fort Lauderdale Strikers	Free
December 29, 2015	(United States) Giuseppe Gentile	(Switzerland) Chiasso	Fort Lauderdale Strikers	Free
December 29, 2015	(Brazil) Maicon Santos	Tampa Bay Rowdies	Fort Lauderdale Strikers	Free
December 30, 2015	(United States) Neil Hlavaty	Carolina RailHawks	Fort Lauderdale Strikers	Swap
December 30, 2015	(Haiti) James Marcelin	Fort Lauderdale Strikers	Carolina RailHawks	Swap
December 31, 2015	(Brazil) Bruno Cardoso	(Brazil) Palmeiras	Fort Lauderdale Strikers	Free
December 31, 2015	(United States) Diego Restrepo	(Venezuela) Metropolitanos	Fort Lauderdale Strikers	Free
December 31, 2015	(Argentina) Matias Reynares	(Uruguay) Defensor Sporting	Fort Lauderdale Strikers	Free
January 3, 2016	(Brazil) Adrianinho	(Brazil) Ponte Preta	Fort Lauderdale Strikers	Free
January 4, 2016	(Brazil) Kléberson	Indy Eleven	Fort Lauderdale Strikers	Free
January 4, 2016	(United States) Brian Shriver	Tampa Bay Rowdies	Carolina RailHawks	Free
January 5, 2016	(Togo) Alex Harlley	Atlanta Silverbacks	(United States) Pittsburgh Riverhounds	Free
January 5, 2016	(Argentina) Mario Daniel Vega	(Cyprus) Anorthosis Famagusta	Miami FC	Free
January 6, 2016	(England) Paul Black	Atlanta Silverbacks	Carolina RailHawks	Free
January 6, 2016	(United States) Zak Boggs	Tampa Bay Rowdies	(United States) Pittsburgh Riverhounds	Free
January 6, 2016	(Guatemala) Marvin Ceballos	Indy Eleven	Carolina RailHawks	Free
January 6, 2016	(United States) Corey Hertzog	Tampa Bay Rowdies	(United States) Pittsburgh Riverhounds	Free
January 6, 2016	(United States) Billy Schuler	(Canada) Vancouver Whitecaps 2	Carolina RailHawks	Free
January 7, 2016	(United States) Rhett Bernstein	(Norway) Mjøndalen	Miami FC	Free
January 7, 2016	(United States) Hunter Gilstrap	Carolina RailHawks	(United States) Pittsburgh Riverhounds	Free
January 7, 2016	(United States) Karsten Smith	Fort Lauderdale Strikers	(United States) Pittsburgh Riverhounds	Free
January 8, 2016	(United States) Jonathan Borrajo	Fort Lauderdale Strikers	Miami FC	Free
January 8, 2016	(United States) Michael Nanchoff	(United States) Portland Timbers	Tampa Bay Rowdies	Free
January 12, 2016	(Costa Rica) César Elizondo	San Antonio Scorpions	(Costa Rica) Pérez Zeledón	Free
January 12, 2016	(Sierra Leone) Michael Lahoud	(United States) Philadelphia Union	New York Cosmos	Loan
January 12, 2016	(Canada) Nikolas Ledgerwood	(Germany) Energie Cottbus	FC Edmonton	Free
January 12, 2016	(Jamaica) Lovel Palmer	(United States) Chicago Fire	Indy Eleven	Free
January 12, 2016	(Colombia) Wálter Restrepo	New York Cosmos	(United States) Philadelphia Union	Undisclosed
January 12, 2016	(Northern Ireland) Jonny Steele	Unattached	Ottawa Fury	Free
January 13, 2016	(Canada) Kyle Porter	Atlanta Silverbacks	Ottawa Fury	Free
January 13, 2016	(Honduras) Junior Sandoval	(Colombia) Jaguares de Córdoba	Jacksonville Armada	Free
January 14, 2016	(Costa Rica) Jairo Arrieta	(United States) D.C. United	New York Cosmos	Free
January 14, 2016	(United States) Rich Balchan	Tampa Bay Rowdies	Ottawa Fury	Free
January 14, 2016	(Argentina) Gastón Cellerino	New York Cosmos	(Bolivia) Bolívar	Free
January 14, 2016	(England) Onua Thomas Obasi	(United States) Rochester Rhinos	Ottawa Fury	Free
January 15, 2016	(England) James Bailey	(India) Pune City	Ottawa Fury	Free
January 15, 2016	(United States) Eric Calvillo	(United States) Real So Cal	New York Cosmos	Free
January 15, 2016	(Republic of Ireland) Colin Falvey	Ottawa Fury	Indy Eleven	Undisclosed
January 15, 2016	(United States) Rauwshan McKenzie	Atlanta Silverbacks	Rayo OKC	Free
January 15, 2016	(Brazil) Pecka	(United States) Real Salt Lake	Rayo OKC	Free
January 15, 2016	(Colombia) Sebastián Velásquez	(United States) New York City	Rayo OKC	Free
January 15, 2016	(England) Matt Watson	(United States) Chicago Fire	Carolina RailHawks	Free
January 19, 2016	(United States) Justin Braun	(United States) Sacramento Republic	Indy Eleven	Undisclosed
January 19, 2016	(Montenegro) Nemanja Vuković	(United States) Sacramento Republic	Indy Eleven	Undisclosed
January 20, 2016	(Brazil) Thiago De Freitas	FC Edmonton	(Portugal) Oriental	Free
January 20, 2016	(Canada) Nathan Ingham	(Canada) K-W United	FC Edmonton	Free
January 20, 2016	(Brazil) Matuzalém	(Italy) Hellas Verona	Miami FC	Free
January 20, 2016	(Brazil) Gustavo Salgueiro	(Brazil) Murici	FC Edmonton	Free
January 21, 2016	(Jamaica) Omar Cummings	San Antonio Scorpions	(United States) FC Cincinnati	Free
January 21, 2016	(United States) Aaron Dennis	(United States) Arizona United	Miami FC	Free
January 21, 2016	(United States) Baggio Kcira	(Austria) Wiener Neustadt	Miami FC	Free
January 21, 2016	(Japan) Kosuke Kimura	Atlanta Silverbacks	Rayo OKC	Free
January 21, 2016	(Brazil) Michel	(United States) Dallas	Rayo OKC	Free
January 22, 2016	(United States) Jon Busch	(United States) Chicago Fire	Indy Eleven	Free
January 22, 2016	(England) Simon Mensing	Atlanta Silverbacks	Carolina RailHawks	Free
January 25, 2016	(Ghana) Derek Boateng	(Spain) Eibar	Rayo OKC	Free
January 25, 2016	(United States) Chris Christian	Atlanta Silverbacks	(United States) Sacramento Republic	Free
January 25, 2016	(United States) Luís Felipe Fernandes	(Brazil) Cruzeiro	Fort Lauderdale Strikers	Free
January 26, 2016	(United States) Tyler Gibson	San Antonio Scorpions	Rayo OKC	Free
January 26, 2016	(Scotland) Nicki Paterson	Ottawa Fury	Indy Eleven	Free
January 26, 2016	(United States) Caleb Patterson-Sewell	(Portugal) Gil Vicente	Rayo OKC	Free
January 27, 2016	(Trinidad and Tobago) Julius James	San Antonio Scorpions	Fort Lauderdale Strikers	Free
January 28, 2016	(Venezuela) Juan Arango	(Mexico) Tijuana	New York Cosmos	Free
January 28, 2016	(England) Adam Eckersley	(Scotland) Hibernian	FC Edmonton	Free
January 28, 2016	(Turks and Caicos Islands) Billy Forbes	San Antonio Scorpions	Rayo OKC	Free
January 28, 2016	(United States) Kyle Hyland	Indy Eleven	(United States) Oklahoma City Energy	Free
January 29, 2016	(Cuba) Jorge Luis Corrales	(United States) Fortuna	Miami FC	Free
January 29, 2016	(Venezuela) Yohandry Orozco	(Saudi Arabia) Al-Ittihad	New York Cosmos	Free
January 30, 2016	(Argentina) Marcos Flores	Jacksonville Armada	(Chile) Curicó Unido	Free
January 30, 2016	(United States) Josue Soto	San Antonio Scorpions	(Finland) Jaro	Free
January 31, 2016	(Germany) Uğur Albayrak	Ottawa Fury	(Germany) Viktoria Aschaffenburg	Free
February 1, 2016	(Venezuela) Roberto Alterio	Unattached	Miami FC	Free
February 1, 2016	(Ghana) Evans Frimpong	Fort Lauderdale Strikers	(United States) Oklahoma City Energy	Free
February 1, 2016	(Austria) Michael Langer	(Norway) Vålerenga	Tampa Bay Rowdies	Free
February 1, 2016	(United States) Calvin Rezende	(United States) Michigan Bucks	Miami FC	Free
February 1, 2016	(United States) Conner Rezende	(United States) Michigan Bucks	Miami FC	Free
February 2, 2016	(El Salvador) Junior Burgos	Atlanta Silverbacks	(United States) Atlanta United	Free
February 2, 2016	(El Salvador) Junior Burgos	(United States) Atlanta United	Tampa Bay Rowdies	Loan
February 2, 2016	(Portugal) Daniel Fernandes	(Netherlands) Twente	Rayo OKC	Free
February 2, 2016	(Canada) Mozzi Gyorio	(United States) Austin Aztex	Ottawa Fury	Free
February 2, 2016	(Canada) Andrew MacRae	Unattached	Ottawa Fury	Free
February 2, 2016	(Democratic Republic of the Congo) Ferrety Sousa	Atlanta Silverbacks	(United States) Wilmington Hammerheads	Free
February 3, 2016	(Brazil) Dalton	(Peru) Universitario	Fort Lauderdale Strikers	Free
February 3, 2016	(Spain) Juanan	(Spain) Leganés	Rayo OKC	Free
February 3, 2016	(United States) Hugo Rhoads	(United States) Portland Timbers U23s	Rayo OKC	Free
February 3, 2016	(United States) Ian Svantesson	(United States) Orlando City U-23	Rayo OKC	Free
February 4, 2016	(United States) Matt Cardone	San Antonio Scorpions	(United States) San Antonio	Free
February 4, 2016	(Colombia) Rafael Castillo	San Antonio Scorpions	(United States) San Antonio	Free
February 4, 2016	(Honduras) Marvin Chávez	San Antonio Scorpions	Rayo OKC	Free
February 4, 2016	(United States) Matt Fondy	(United States) Louisville City	Jacksonville Armada	Undisclosed
February 4, 2016	(Canada) Mason Trafford	Ottawa Fury	Miami FC	Undisclosed
February 5, 2016	(Germany) Kristian Nicht	Indy Eleven	Minnesota United FC	Free
February 5, 2016	(Georgia (country)) Zourab Tsiskaridze	San Antonio Scorpions	(Czech Republic) Teplice	Free
February 5, 2016	(United States) Sergio van Kanten	(United States) Miami Dade	Miami FC	Free
February 8, 2016	(Brazil) Matheus Carvalho	(Brazil) Fluminense	Fort Lauderdale Strikers	Free
February 8, 2016	(United States) Danny Cruz	(United States) Philadelphia Union	Minnesota United FC	Free
February 8, 2016	(Senegal) Papé Diakité	(Belgium) Royal Antwerp	FC Edmonton	Free
February 8, 2016	(United States) Jeremy Hall	(United States) New England Revolution	Tampa Bay Rowdies	Free
February 9, 2016	(Brazil) Adaílton	(United States) Chicago Fire	Miami FC	Free
February 10, 2016	(Spain) Gorka Larrea	Unattached	Indy Eleven	Free
February 10, 2016	(Cameroon) Joseph Nane	San Antonio Scorpions	(Kazakhstan) Okzhetpes	Free
February 10, 2016	(Honduras) Erick Norales	Indy Eleven	Rayo OKC	Free
February 10, 2016	(Honduras) Milton Palacios	San Antonio Scorpions	(United States) San Antonio	Free
February 10, 2016	(United States) Jarad van Schaik	(United States) Charleston Battery	Rayo OKC	Free
February 11, 2016	(United States) Aly Hassan	Ottawa Fury	Carolina RailHawks	Free
February 11, 2016	(United States) Kyle Venter	(United States) Tulsa Roughnecks	Ottawa Fury	Free
February 12, 2016	(Jamaica) Stephen DeRoux	San Antonio Scorpions	Indy Eleven	Free
February 12, 2016	(United States) Sean Lewis	(Australia) Olympia Warriors	Jacksonville Armada	Free
February 12, 2016	(Netherlands) Patrick Otte	Unattached	Jacksonville Armada	Free
February 12, 2016	(United States) Ben Speas	(United States) Columbus Crew	Minnesota United FC	Free
February 15, 2016	(Argentina) Gerardo Bruna	(England) Accrington Stanley	Ottawa Fury	Free
February 15, 2016	(Canada) Jamie Dell	Carolina RailHawks	(United States) FC Cincinnati	Free
February 16, 2016	(Haiti) Jean Alexandre	(Malaysia) Negeri Sembilan	Fort Lauderdale Strikers	Free
February 16, 2016	(Brazil) Pedro Ferreira-Mendes	Atlanta Silverbacks	Puerto Rico	Free
February 16, 2016	(Puerto Rico) Jackie Marrero	(Finland) Kultsu	Puerto Rico	Free
February 16, 2016	(Kenya) David Ochieng	(Saudi Arabia) Al-Taawoun	New York Cosmos	Free
February 17, 2016	(Venezuela) Bernardo Añor	(United States) Sporting Kansas City	Minnesota United FC	Loan
February 17, 2016	(Canada) Hanson Boakai	FC Edmonton	(Croatia) Dugopolje	Undisclosed
February 17, 2016	(United States) Michael Reed	Atlanta Silverbacks	(United States) San Antonio	Free
February 18, 2016	(United States) Shawn Chin	Fort Lauderdale Strikers	(United States) San Antonio	Free
February 19, 2016	(Brazil) Pablo Campos	Minnesota United FC	Miami FC	Free
February 19, 2016	(Bolivia) Yasmani Duk	(Bolivia) Sport Boys Warnes	New York Cosmos	Loan
February 22, 2016	(United States) Aaron Perez	(United States) Orange County Blues	Minnesota United FC	Free
February 23, 2016	(Jamaica) Dino Williams	(Jamaica) Montego Bay United	Indy Eleven	Loan
February 24, 2016	(United States) Robbie Findley	(Canada) Toronto	Rayo OKC	Free
February 25, 2016	(El Salvador) Richard Menjivar	Tampa Bay Rowdies	Rayo OKC	Free
February 25, 2016	(Germany) Jason Plumhoff	(United States) Harrisburg City Islanders	FC Edmonton	Free
February 25, 2016	(Canada) John Smits	FC Edmonton	(United States) Wilmington Hammerheads	Free
February 26, 2016	(United States) Eric Avila	(Mexico) Santos Laguna	Tampa Bay Rowdies	Free
February 26, 2016	(United States) Gabriel Farfán	(Mexico) Chiapas	New York Cosmos	Loan
February 26, 2016	(Brazil) Paulo Ferreira-Mendes	Atlanta Silverbacks	Puerto Rico	Free
February 26, 2016	(Puerto Rico) Jorge Rivera	(Puerto Rico) Guayama	Puerto Rico	Free
February 29, 2016	(United States) Lionel Brown	Fort Lauderdale Strikers	Miami FC	Free
March 1, 2016	(United States) Joe Franco	(United States) LA Galaxy II	Miami FC	Free
March 2, 2016	(Brazil) Pablo Dyego	(Brazil) Fluminense	Ottawa Fury	Loan
March 2, 2016	(Canada) Marcel de Jong	(United States) Sporting Kansas City	Ottawa Fury	Free
March 2, 2016	(United States) Jimmy Ockford	(United States) Seattle Sounders	New York Cosmos	Loan
March 4, 2016	(El Salvador) Tomás Granitto	FC Edmonton	(United States) Swope Park Rangers	Free
March 4, 2016	(The Gambia) Ismaila Jome	Unattached	Minnesota United FC	Free
March 4, 2016	(United States) Jimmy Mulligan	New York Cosmos	(United States) Swope Park Rangers	Loan
March 4, 2016	(Guyana) Chris Nurse	Carolina RailHawks	Puerto Rico	Free
March 4, 2016	(Spain) Ramón Soria	(Slovenia) Celje	Puerto Rico	Free
March 8, 2016	(Jamaica) Damion Lowe	(United States) Seattle Sounders	Minnesota United FC	Loan
March 10, 2016	(Cameroon) Charles Eloundou	(United States) Colorado Rapids	Jacksonville Armada	Free
March 10, 2016	(United States) David Meves	Fort Lauderdale Strikers	Puerto Rico	Free
March 10, 2016	(Brazil) Oliver	Ottawa Fury	Puerto Rico	Free
March 10, 2016	(Greece) Georgios Samaras	(England) West Bromwich Albion	Rayo OKC	Free
March 11, 2016	(Scotland) Neill Collins	(England) Sheffield United	Tampa Bay Rowdies	Free
March 11, 2016	(United States) Jeff Michaud	Tampa Bay Rowdies	(United States) Wilmington Hammerheads	Loan
March 12, 2016	(Cuba) Ariel Martínez	(United States) Charleston Battery	Miami FC	Free
March 14, 2016	(Spain) John Neeskens	New York Cosmos	(United States) LA Galaxy II	Free
March 16, 2016	(United States) Garry Lewis	Unattached	Jacksonville Armada	Free
March 18, 2016	(Croatia) Niko Kranjčar	(Ukraine) Dynamo Kyiv	New York Cosmos	Free
March 21, 2016	(Slovakia) Michal Mravec	Atlanta Silverbacks	(Finland) RoPS	Free
March 24, 2016	(The Gambia) Futty Danso	Carolina RailHawks	Rayo OKC	Free
March 24, 2016	(United States) Josh Hughes	Atlanta Silverbacks	(United States) Harrisburg City Islanders	Free
March 24, 2016	(Jamaica) Ryan Johnson	(South Korea) Seoul E-Land	Rayo OKC	Free
March 24, 2016	(Finland) Verneri Välimaa	Tampa Bay Rowdies	(United States) Orange County Blues	Loan
March 24, 2016	(Spain) Yuma	(Spain) Puerta Bonita	Rayo OKC	Free
March 25, 2016	(Jamaica) Akeil Barrett	Jacksonville Armada	(Sweden) Piteå	Undisclosed
March 25, 2016	(United States) C. J. Cochran	Atlanta Silverbacks	(United States) Oklahoma City Energy	Free
March 25, 2016	(Israel) Idan Vered	(Serbia) Red Star Belgrade	Ottawa Fury	Free
March 26, 2016	(Costa Rica) Brandon Poltronieri	Ottawa Fury	(United States) Arizona United	Free
March 28, 2016	(United States) Jeb Brovsky	(United States) New York City	Minnesota United FC	Free
March 29, 2016	(Colombia) Jair Reinoso	(China) Harbin Yiteng	Indy Eleven	Free
March 30, 2016	(Brazil) Cristiano	Minnesota United FC	Puerto Rico	Free
March 30, 2016	(United States) Tyler Rudy	(United States) New England Revolution	Puerto Rico	Free
March 31, 2016	(United States) Brian Bement	Unattached	Puerto Rico	Free
April 1, 2016	(France) Hugo Leroux	(United States) Miami City	Miami FC	Free
April 1, 2016	(United States) Jonathon Orlando	Unattached	Carolina RailHawks	Free
April 2, 2016	(Barbados) Keasel Broome	New York Cosmos	(United States) Harrisburg City Islanders	Free
April 4, 2016	(Wales) Eliot Richards	(England) Cheltenham Town	Tampa Bay Rowdies	Free
April 6, 2016	(United States) Sidney Rivera	(United States) Orlando City	Puerto Rico	Free
April 6, 2016	(United States) Trevor Spangenberg	(United States) New England Revolution	Puerto Rico	Free
April 7, 2016	(Uruguay) Bryan Olivera	(Brazil) Fluminense	Ottawa Fury	Loan
April 8, 2016	(United States) Conor Agnew	Unattached	Puerto Rico	Free
April 8, 2016	(United States) Austin Pack	Unattached	Puerto Rico	Free
April 10, 2016	(Trinidad and Tobago) Kevan George	(United States) Columbus Crew	Jacksonville Armada	Free
April 14, 2016	(Colombia) Camilo Botero	Unattached	Puerto Rico	Free
April 14, 2016	(Jamaica) Omar Gordon	(Jamaica) Montego Bay United	Indy Eleven	Loan
April 15, 2016	(United States) Haji Wright	New York Cosmos	(Germany) Schalke 04	Free
April 19, 2016	(Honduras) Ramón Núñez	(Honduras) Real España	Fort Lauderdale Strikers	Free
April 21, 2016	(United States) Bryan Arguez	(United States) Miami City	Miami FC	Free
April 27, 2016	(United States) Macklin Robinson	Unattached	Carolina RailHawks	Free
April 29, 2016	(Guatemala) Moises Hernandez	(United States) Dallas	Rayo OKC	Loan
May 4, 2016	(Haiti) Steward Ceus	Atlanta Silverbacks	Minnesota United FC	Free
May 4, 2016	(England) Joe Cole	(England) Coventry City	Tampa Bay Rowdies	Free
May 10, 2016	(Costa Rica) Rudy Dawson	(Costa Rica) Uruguay	Puerto Rico	Free
May 13, 2016	(Republic of Ireland) Richie Ryan	Jacksonville Armada	Miami FC	$750,000
May 16, 2016	(Mexico) Ramon Martin Del Campo	(Costa Rica) Saprissa	Puerto Rico	Loan
May 20, 2016	(United States) Kyle Culberson	Unattached	Puerto Rico	Free
May 24, 2016	(Sierra Leone) Michael Lahoud	(United States) Philadelphia Union	Miami FC	$300,000
May 26, 2016	(Scotland) Jack Blake	(England) Nottingham Forest	Minnesota United FC	Free
May 27, 2016	(Montenegro) Bljedi Bardic	(United States) Clarkstown Eagles	Puerto Rico	Free
June 4, 2016	(Canada) Mallan Roberts	FC Edmonton	Ottawa Fury	Loan
June 8, 2016	(Mexico) Gerardo Torrado	(Mexico) Cruz Azul	Indy Eleven	Free
June 10, 2016	(United States) Anthony Wallace	Unattached	Jacksonville Armada	Free
June 11, 2016	(Guinea) Souleymane Youla	(Hungary) Budapest Honvéd	Indy Eleven	Free
June 20, 2016	(Sweden) Alexander Andersson	(Sweden) Degerfors	Jacksonville Armada	Free
June 20, 2016	(Sweden) Nicklas Maripuu	(Sweden) Sirius	Jacksonville Armada	Free
June 21, 2016	(Israel) Idan Vered	Ottawa Fury	(Israel) Beitar Jerusalem	Free
June 23, 2016	(Croatia) Niko Kranjčar	New York Cosmos	(Scotland) Rangers	Free
June 24, 2016	(Canada) Karl Ouimette	(United States) New York Red Bulls	Jacksonville Armada	Loan
June 27, 2016	(United States) Bryan Arguez	Miami FC	Fort Lauderdale Strikers	Free
June 27, 2016	(United States) Matt Fondy	Jacksonville Armada	Carolina RailHawks	Undisclosed
June 28, 2016	(Canada) Eddie Edward	FC Edmonton	Ottawa Fury	Free
June 29, 2016	(United States) Adrian Ables	Unattached	Rayo OKC	Free
June 29, 2016	(United States) Bryan Byers	Unattached	Rayo OKC	Free
June 29, 2016	(Ghana) Kwadwo Poku	(United States) New York City	Miami FC	$750,000
June 29, 2016	(United States) Zach Steinberger	(United States) Houston Dynamo	Jacksonville Armada	Loan
June 30, 2016	(United States) Steven Miller	Carolina RailHawks	(United States) Tulsa Roughnecks	Loan
July 1, 2016	(United States) Gabriel Farfán	(Mexico) Chiapas	Miami FC	Undisclosed
July 1, 2016	(Puerto Rico) Héctor Ramos	(El Salvador) Águila	Puerto Rico	Free
July 6, 2016	(Guam) Shawn Nicklaw	Jacksonville Armada	FC Edmonton	Swap
July 6, 2016	(Germany) Jason Plumhoff	FC Edmonton	Jacksonville Armada	Swap
July 8, 2016	(United States) Giuseppe Gentile	Fort Lauderdale Strikers	Ottawa Fury	Swap
July 8, 2016	(Brazil) Paulo Jr.	Ottawa Fury	Fort Lauderdale Strikers	Swap
July 12, 2016	(Mexico) Omar Bravo	(Mexico) Guadalajara	Carolina RailHawks	$150,000
July 12, 2016	(United States) Sebastien Ibeagha	(United States) Houston Dynamo	Rayo OKC	Loan
July 12, 2016	(Northern Ireland) Thomas Stewart	(United States) Sacramento Republic	Ottawa Fury	Undisclosed
July 13, 2016	(United States) Devon Sandoval	(United States) Real Salt Lake	Rayo OKC	Loan
July 14, 2016	(Cuba) Jorge Luis Corrales	Miami FC	Fort Lauderdale Strikers	Free
July 14, 2016	(Northern Ireland) Jonny Steele	Ottawa Fury	Miami FC	Undisclosed
July 15, 2016	(Canada) Maxim Tissot	(Canada) Montreal Impact	Ottawa Fury	Free
July 17, 2016	(United States) Karsten Smith	(United States) Pittsburgh Riverhounds	FC Edmonton	Free
July 18, 2016	(Denmark) Martin Vingaard	(Denmark) Nordsjælland	Tampa Bay Rowdies	Free
July 19, 2016	(Colombia) Carlos Preciado	(Qatar) Al-Sailiya	Tampa Bay Rowdies	Free
July 19, 2016	(England) Ryan Williams	(Scotland) Inverness CT	Ottawa Fury	Free
July 20, 2016	(Canada) Jamar Dixon	(Finland) Jaro	Ottawa Fury	Undisclosed
July 21, 2016	(United States) Michael Daly	(United States) Bethlehem Steel	Carolina RailHawks	Loan
July 26, 2016	(United States) James Moberg	(United States) Real Monarchs	Carolina RailHawks	Loan
July 29, 2016	(Portugal) Pedro Galvão	(Portugal) Gil Vicente	FC Edmonton	Free
August 2, 2016	(United States) Sebastian Evers	Jacksonville Armada	Miami FC	Free
August 4, 2016	(United States) Aly Hassan	Carolina RailHawks	(United States) Charlotte Independence	Loan
August 4, 2016	(Italy) Vincenzo Rennella	(Spain) Real Betis	Miami FC	Free
August 5, 2016	(Canada) Nathan Ingham	FC Edmonton	(Canada) Toronto II	Loan
August 9, 2016	(Italy) Amauri	(Italy) Torino	Fort Lauderdale Strikers	Free
August 26, 2016	(Jamaica) Dennis Chin	Ottawa Fury	(Israel) Ironi Nesher	Undisclosed
September 2, 2016	(United States) Hunter Freeman	New York Cosmos	Miami FC	Undisclosed
September 7, 2016	(United States) Diego Restrepo	Fort Lauderdale Strikers	Tampa Bay Rowdies	Undisclosed
September 20, 2016	(United States) Ryan Richter	(United States) Bethlehem Steel	New York Cosmos	Undisclosed
