= 2016 Puerto Rico FC season =

Puerto Rico FC
2016 season
- Owner: Carmelo Anthony
- President: Thomas Payne
- Head coach: Adrian Whitbread
- Stadium: Juan Ramón Loubriel Stadium
- NASL: Spring: Did not enter Fall:5-9-8 (9th); Combined: 5-9-8 (12th)
- Soccer Bowl: Did not qualify
- Copa Luis Villarejo: Champions
- Top goalscorer: League: Héctor Ramos (8); All: Héctor Ramos (8)
- Highest home attendance: League: 6,474 (July 2 vs. Indy Eleven)
- Lowest home attendance: League: 1,233 (Sept 7 vs. Ottawa Fury)
- Average home league attendance: League: 3,801
Home colors	Away colors

The 2016 Puerto Rico FC season was the club's first season of existence. The club played in North American Soccer League, the second tier of the American soccer pyramid, enter only in the Fall season in which they finished 9th.

After winning the Copa Luis Villarejo on November 20; Puerto Rico FC qualified for the 2017 CFU Club Championship with matches taking place in the coming-up 2017 season.

== Season review ==
=== Commitment to the Community ===
As part of their commitment to the community in May 2016, Puerto Rico FC had their first three clinics of the season in Dorado, Farjardo and Hatillo with the participation of over a hundred boys and girls. During these clinics the Puerto Rico FC players turned into coaches, teaching the children about ball control, proper goalkeeping and teamwork. After the different workshops the children faced off against the players in a friendly match. The field of Quintas de Dorado was the site of the first clinic with youth clubs Eleven FC and Toa Baja SC. Next, Puerto Rico FC visited the Tomás Donés Sports Complex and the boys and girls of Cariduros FC. To round up the first leg of clinics the players took a trip to the city of Hatillo where they trained with Hatillo SC and Leal Arecibo in the Francisco Deida Sports Complex.

=== Clásico de Fútbol ===
As part of the Puerto Rican Day Parade weekend celebration, Puerto Rico FC will travel to New York City to meet the Puerto Rico national team in a friendly match. This match is part of PRFC's ongoing preseason and build up to their inaugural match at the Juan Ramón Loubriel Stadium next July 2 in Bayamón, Puerto Rico.

== Roster ==
As of match played October 29, 2016

No.	Name	Nationality	Position	Date of birth (age)	Signed from	Signed in	Contract ends	Apps.	Goals
Goalkeepers
1	Austin Pack	(United States)	GK	25 February 1994 (age 32)	Unattached	2016	2017	0	0
18	Trevor Spangenberg	(United States)	GK	21 April 1991 (age 35)	New England Revolution	2016	2017	12	0
24	David Meves	(United States)	GK	20 July 1990 (age 36)	Fort Lauderdale Strikers	2016	2017	10	0
Defenders
2	Cristiano	(Brazil)	DF	25 May 1986 (age 40)	Minnesota United	2016	2017	21	0
3	Camilo Botero	(Colombia)	DF	23 March 1991 (age 35)	Unattached	2016	2017	6	0
4	Rudy Dawson	(Costa Rica)	DF	8 May 1988 (age 38)	(Costa Rica) Uruguay	2016	2017	20	0
5	Ramón Soria	(Spain)	DF	9 March 1989 (age 37)	(Slovenia) Celje	2016	2017	21	0
12	Ramon Martin Del Campo	(United States)	DF	9 March 1989 (age 37)	loan from (Costa Rica) Deportivo Saprissa	2016	2017	16	0
13	Kyle Culbertson	(United States)	DF	16 November 1992 (age 33)	Unattached	2016	2017	15	1
Midfielders
6	Connor Agnew	(United States)	MF		Unattached	2016	2017	6	0
8	Chris Nurse	(Guyana)	MF	7 May 1984 (age 42)	Carolina RailHawks	2016	2017	14	0
10	Joseph Marrero	(Puerto Rico)	MF	9 April 1993 (age 33)	(Puerto Rico) Criollos de Caguas	2016	2017	16	1
11	Paulo	(Brazil)	MF	13 May 1990 (age 36)	Atlanta Silverbacks	2016	2017	21	1
21	Michael Kafari	(Ghana)	MF	8 August 1989 (age 37)		2016	2017	15	0
22	Evans Frimpong	(Ghana)	MF	30 October 1991 (age 34)	Oklahoma City Energy	2016	2017	3	0
29	Tyler Rudy	(United States)	MF	29 September 1993 (age 32)	New England Revolution	2016	2017	21	2
Forwards
9	Pedro	(Brazil)	FW	13 May 1990 (age 36)	Atlanta Silverbacks	2016	2017	12	0
14	Brian Bement	(United States)	FW	7 February 1993 (age 33)	(United States) Loyola University	2016	2017	13	0
16	David Eduardo López	(Mexico)	FW	6 July 1992 (age 34)	(El Salvador) Isidro Metapán	2016	2017	5	0
17	Oliver	(Brazil)	FW	29 August 1992 (age 34)	(Canada) Ottawa Fury	2016	2017	9	1
19	Jorge Rivera	(Puerto Rico)	FW	24 March 1996 (age 30)	(Puerto Rico) Guayama	2016	2017	9	0
20	Héctor Ramos	(Puerto Rico)	FW	4 May 1990 (age 36)	(El Salvador) Águila	2016	2017	19	8
23	Sidney Rivera	(United States)	FW	15 November 1993 (age 32)	Orlando City SC	2016	2017	16	3
26	Bljedi Bardic	(Montenegro)	FW	10 January 1992 (age 34)	(United States) Clarkstown Eagles	2016	2017	3	1

== Transfers ==
=== In ===
Date	Position	Nationality	Name	From	Fee	Ref.
16 February 2016	FW	(Brazil)	Pedro	Atlanta Silverbacks	Undisclosed	
16 February 2016	MF	(Puerto Rico)	Joseph Marrero	Criollos de Caguas	Undisclosed	
26 February 2016	MF	(Brazil)	Paulo	Atlanta Silverbacks	Undisclosed	
26 February 2016	FW	(Puerto Rico)	Jorge Rivera	Guayama	Undisclosed	
4 March 2016	DF	(Spain)	Ramón Soria	Celje	Undisclosed	
4 March 2016	MF	(Guyana)	Chris Nurse	Carolina RailHawks	Undisclosed	
10 March 2016	FW	(Brazil)	Oliver	Ottawa Fury	Undisclosed	
10 March 2016	GK	(United States)	David Meves	Fort Lauderdale Strikers	Undisclosed	
30 March 2016	DF	(Brazil)	Cristiano	Minnesota United	Undisclosed	
30 March 2016	MF	(United States)	Tyler Rudy	New England Revolution	Undisclosed	
31 March 2016	FW	(United States)	Brian Bement	Loyola University	Undisclosed	
8 April 2016	GK	(United States)	Trevor Spangenberg	New England Revolution	Undisclosed	
8 April 2016	FW	(United States)	Sidney Rivera	Orlando City	Undisclosed	
8 April 2016	GK	(United States)	Austin Pack		Free	
8 April 2016	MF	(United States)	Connor Agnew		Free	
14 April 2016	DF	(Colombia)	Camilo Botero		Free	
10 May 2016	DF	(Costa Rica)	Rudy Dawson	Uruguay	Undisclosed	
18 May 2016	DF	(United States)	Kyle Culbertson		Free	
27 May 2016	FW	(Montenegro)	Bljedi Bardic	Clarkstown SC Eagles	Undisclosed	
29 June 2016	FW	(Puerto Rico)	Héctor Ramos	Águila	Undisclosed	
16 July 2016	MF	(Ghana)	Evans Frimpong	Oklahoma City Energy	Undisclosed	
23 July 2016	MF	(Ghana)	Michael Kafari		Free	
	FW	(Mexico)	David Eduardo López	Isidro Metapán	Undisclosed	

=== Out ===
Date	Position	Nationality	Name	To	Fee	Ref.

=== Loans in ===
Date from	Position	Nationality	Name	From	Date to	Ref.
12 May 2016	DF	(United States)	Ramon Martin Del Campo	Deportivo Saprissa	End of Fall Season	

== Friendlies ==
Win Loss Draw

=== Pre-season ===
March 15, 2016 Scrimmage	Puerto Rico FC	4–2	(United States) Chivas Florida Football Academy	Bradenton, Florida
EST		Summary		Stadium: IMG Academy; Attendance: Closed-door

May 17, 2016 Scrimmage	Puerto Rico FC	4–1	Puerto Rico	San Juan, Puerto Rico
EST

May 18, 2016 Scrimmage	Puerto Rico FC	2–1	(Puerto Rico) Bayamón F.C. U-20	San Juan, Puerto Rico
EST

May 24, 2016 Friendly	Puerto Rico FC	1–0	(Puerto Rico) Caguas F.C.	Caguas, Puerto Rico
8PM EST	Dawson			Stadium: Villa de Rey; Attendance: Open-door

Friendly	Puerto Rico FC	3–3	Costa Rica	Bradenton, Florida
				Stadium: IMG Academy; Attendance: Closed-door

June 2, 2016 Friendly	Puerto Rico FC	1–0	United States	Bradenton, Florida
	Bement			Stadium: IMG Academy; Attendance: Closed-door

June 11, 2016 Clásico de Fútbol	Puerto Rico FC	1–0	Puerto Rico	Queens, New York
7:30PM EST	Marrero 12'	Report	De La Rosa (yellow card) 60'	Stadium: Belson Stadium

== Competitions ==
=== NASL Fall season ===
==== Standings ====
Pos	Team	Pld	W	D	L	GF	GA	GD	Pts	Qualification
1	New York Cosmos (F)	22	14	5	3	44	21	+23	47	Playoffs
2	Indy Eleven	22	11	4	7	36	25	+11	37	
3	FC Edmonton	22	10	6	6	16	14	+2	36	
4	Rayo OKC	22	9	8	5	28	21	+7	35	
5	Miami FC	22	9	6	7	31	27	+4	33	
6	Fort Lauderdale Strikers	22	7	5	10	19	28	−9	26	
7	Carolina RailHawks	22	7	5	10	25	35	−10	26	
8	Minnesota United	22	6	7	9	25	25	0	25	
9	Puerto Rico	22	5	9	8	19	31	−12	24	
10	Tampa Bay Rowdies	22	5	8	9	29	32	−3	23	
11	Jacksonville Armada	22	5	8	9	25	35	−10	23	
12	Ottawa Fury	22	5	7	10	23	26	−3	22	

Source: NASL
Rules for classification: 1) points; 2) total goal differential; 3) total goals scored; 4) head-to-head record; 5) away goal differential; 6) away goals scored
(F) Fall season champion

==== Results summary ====
Overall								Home						Away					
Pld	W	D	L	GF	GA	GD	Pts	W	D	L	GF	GA	GD	W	D	L	GF	GA	GD
22	5	9	8	19	31	−12	24	3	5	3	10	12	−2	2	4	5	9	19	−10

Last updated: 22 November 2016.
Source: Match reports

==== Results by round ====
Round	1	2	3	4	5	6	7	8	9	10	11	12	13	14	15	16	17	18	19	20	21	22
Stadium	H	A	A	A	H	A	A	H	A	H	A	H	H	H	H	A	H	A	H	A	A	H
Result	D	L	D	L	W	L	D	L	D	L	D	L	D	D	D	W	W	W	D	L	L	W
Position	8	9	8	10	9	10	9	10	12	12	12	12	12	12	12	11	11	9	10	11	11	9

Updated to match(es) played on 22 November 2016. Source: Match reports
A = Away; H = Home; W = Win; D = Draw; L = Loss

==== Matches ====
July 2, 2016 1	Puerto Rico	1–1	Indy Eleven	Bayamón
19:30 EDT	Dawson (yellow card) 12'; Del Campo (yellow card) 45'; Culbertson (yellow card) 58'; Ramos 74'	Summary	Paterson (yellow card) 58'; Youla 90'	Stadium: Juan Ramón Loubriel Stadium; Attendance: 6,474; Referee: Valdin Legister

July 9, 2016 2	Jacksonville Armada	2–1	Puerto Rico	Jacksonville
19:00 EDT	Johnson 9' (yellow card) 40'; Dixon 27'; Jérôme (yellow card) 78'	Summary	Nurse (yellow card) 70'; Ramos 78'	Stadium: Community First Park; Attendance: 5,134; Referee: Kevin Terry

July 13, 2016 3	Rayo OKC	2–2	Puerto Rico	Yukon
21:00 EDT	Forbes (yellow card) 32'; Pecka (yellow card) 45+'; Velasquez 83'; Michel 90' (pen.)	Summary	Ramos 34'; Rudy 55', (yellow card) 59'; Pedro (yellow card) 57'; Del Campo (yellow card) 74'	Stadium: Miller Stadium; Attendance: 3,531; Referee: Daniel Radford

July 16, 2016 4	Tampa Bay Rowdies	3–0	Puerto Rico	St. Petersburg
19:30 EDT	Cole 10'; Avila 15'; Nanchoff (yellow card) 63'; King (yellow card) 77'; Heinemann 90'	Summary	Dawson (yellow card) 33'; S. Rivera (yellow card) 76'	Stadium: Al Lang Stadium; Attendance: 5,873; Referee: Rubiel Vazquez

July 23, 2016 5	Puerto Rico	1–0	Rayo OKC	Bayamón
19:30 EDT	Ramos 53'; Paulo (yellow card) 66'; Culbertson (yellow card) 90+1'	Summary	Hernández (yellow card) 72'; Forbes (yellow card) 90+1'	Stadium: Juan Ramón Loubriel Stadium; Attendance: 4,907; Referee: Kimbell Ward

July 30, 2016 6	New York Cosmos	3–0	Puerto Rico	Hempstead
19:00 EDT	Cristiano 16' (o.g.); Arango 84'; Mkosana 90+2'	Summary	J. Rivera (yellow card) 22'; Kafari (yellow card) 82'	Stadium: Shuart Stadium; Attendance: 3,391; Referee: Edvin Jurisevic

August 3, 2016 7	Minnesota United	1–1	Puerto Rico	Blaine
20:00 EDT	Kafari 46' (o.g.); Ibson (yellow card) 27'	Summary	Ramos 5'; Rudy (yellow card) 59'; Kafari (yellow card) 66'; Dawson (yellow card) 88'; S. Rivera (yellow card) 90+4'	Stadium: National Sports Center; Attendance: 6,101; Referee: Guido Gonzales Jr.

August 6, 2016 8	Puerto Rico	0–1	Edmonton	Bayamón
19:30 EDT	Del Campo (yellow card) 5'	Summary	Eckersley (yellow card) 22'; Nicklaw (yellow card) 28'; Ameobi 74'	Stadium: Juan Ramón Loubriel Stadium; Attendance: 3,307; Referee: William Anderson

August 13, 2016 9	Carolina RailHawks	2–2	Puerto Rico	Cary
19:30 EDT	Bravo 40', (yellow card) 90+2'; Fondy 89'	Summary	Paulo 52'; Ramos 67'	Stadium: WakeMed Soccer Park; Attendance: 6,056; Referee: Alex Chilowicz

August 20, 2016 10	Puerto Rico	1–2	New York Cosmos	Bayamón
19:30 EDT	Nurse (yellow card) 23'; Ramos 28'; Ramos (yellow card) 60'; Paulo (yellow card) 87'	Summary	Arrieta 62'; Guenzatti 90+1'; Guenzatti (yellow card) 90+2'	Stadium: Juan Ramón Loubriel Stadium; Attendance: 4,208; Referee: Kimbell Ward

August 28, 2016 11	Edmonton	0–0	Puerto Rico	Edmonton
18:00 EDT	Eckersley (yellow card) 31'; Nyassi (red card) 86'; Nicklaw (yellow card) 90+3'	Summary	Nurse (yellow card) 42'; Soria (yellow card) 88'	Stadium: Clarke Stadium; Attendance: 2,007; Referee: Yusri Rudolf

September 3, 2016 12	Puerto Rico	0–3	Miami	Bayamón
19:30 EDT		Summary	Steele 15'; Cvitanich 54'; Poku 88'	Stadium: Juan Ramón Loubriel Stadium; Attendance: 2,556; Referee: Sandy Vasquez

September 7, 2016 13	Puerto Rico	0–0	Ottawa Fury	Bayamón
19:30 EDT	Rudy (yellow card) 57'; Marrero (yellow card) 66'	Summary	Bailey (yellow card) 37'; Timbó (yellow card) 51'; Roberts (yellow card) 90+4'	Stadium: Juan Ramón Loubriel Stadium; Attendance: 1,233; Referee: Javier Santos

September 10, 2016 14	Puerto Rico	0–0	Tampa Bay Rowdies	Bayamón
19:30 EDT		Summary	Mkandawire (yellow card) 31'	Stadium: Juan Ramón Loubriel Stadium; Attendance: 3,975; Referee: Sandy Vasquez

September 17, 2016 15	Puerto Rico	3–3	Jacksonville Armada	Bayamón
19:30 EDT	Marrero 3'; Oliver 32'; Soria (yellow card) 59'; Rivera 84'	Summary	Eloundou 29'; Bahner (yellow card) 34'; Jérôme 57'; Keita 83'	Stadium: Juan Ramón Loubriel Stadium; Attendance: 3,243; Referee: Kevin Morrison

September 23, 2016 16	Miami	0–1	Puerto Rico	Miami
20:00 EDT	Smith (yellow card) 20'	Summary	Soria (yellow card) 21'; Nurse (yellow card) 38'; Campos 79' (o.g.); Oliver (yellow card) 84'; Ramos (yellow card) 90+5'	Stadium: FIU Stadium; Attendance: 10,012; Referee: Geoff Gamble

September 28, 2016 17	Puerto Rico	2–1	Fort Lauderdale Strikers	Bayamón
19:30 EDT	Rudy 41'; Cristiano (yellow card) 44'; Marrero (yellow card) 45+1'; Bardic 67'	Summary	Amauri 2'; Pineda (yellow card) 40'; Agbossoumonde (yellow card) 90+2'	Stadium: Juan Ramón Loubriel Stadium; Attendance: 1,424; Referee: Rodphin Harris

October 2, 2016 18	Ottawa Fury	1–2	Puerto Rico	Ottawa
19:00 EDT	Williams 15'	Summary	Culbertson 27' (yellow card) 78'; Dawson (red card) 71'; Rivera 77'; Spangenberg (yellow card) 88'	Stadium: TD Place Stadium; Attendance: 4,556; Referee: Robert Schaap

October 8, 2016 19	Puerto Rico	0–0	Minnesota United	Bayamón
19:30 EDT		Summary	Lowe (yellow card) 73'; Cruz (yellow card) 82'	Stadium: Juan Ramón Loubriel Stadium; Attendance: 4,347; Referee: Adrian Skeete

October 15, 2016 20	Fort Lauderdale Strikers	2–0	Puerto Rico	Lauderhill
19:00 EDT	Sandoval (yellow card) 71'; Moura 78'; Angulo 85'	Summary	Kafari (yellow card) 23'; Cristiano (yellow card) 58'; Rudy (yellow card) 90+2'	Stadium: Central Broward Regional Park; Attendance: 1,065; Referee: Caleb Mendez

October 22, 2016 21	Indy Eleven	3–0	Puerto Rico	Indianapolis
19:30 EDT	Braun 36'; Zayed 45'; Mares 45+3'	Summary	Oliver (yellow card) 14' (yellow-red card) 38'	Stadium: Michael Carroll Stadium; Attendance: 8,916; Referee: Rosendo Mendoza

October 29, 2016 22	Puerto Rico	2–1	Carolina RailHawks	Bayamón
19:30 EDT	Rivera 6'; Ramos 42'	Summary	Moses 32'; Bravo (yellow card) 76'; Watson (yellow card) 90+3'	Stadium: Juan Ramón Loubriel Stadium; Attendance: 6,137; Referee: Valdrin Legister

=== Copa Luis Villarejo ===
==== Quarterfinals ====
November 4, 2016 First leg	Puerto Rico (Bayamón, Puerto Rico)	2–0	Guayama	Bayamón
19:30 EDT	Ramos 54'; S. Rivera 56'	Report		Stadium: Juan Ramón Loubriel Stadium

November 6, 2016 Second leg	Guayama	0–4 (0–6 agg.)	(Bayamón, Puerto Rico) Puerto Rico	Guayama
19:00 EDT		Report	J. Rivera 23'; Bement 38', 43'; Oliver 74'	Stadium: Cancha de Balompié de Guayama

==== Semifinals ====
November 10, 2016 First leg	Bayamón (Bayamón, Puerto Rico)	0–3	(Bayamón, Puerto Rico) Puerto Rico	Bayamón
19:30 EDT				Stadium: Bayamón Soccer Complex

November 16, 2016 Second leg	Puerto Rico (Bayamón, Puerto Rico)	1–0 (4–0 agg.)	(Bayamón, Puerto Rico) Bayamón	Bayamón
19:00 EDT	Cristiano 44' (pen.)			Stadium: Juan Ramón Loubriel Stadium

==== Final ====
November 20, 2016	Puerto Rico (Bayamón, Puerto Rico)	4–1	Criollos Caguas	Bayamón
19:00 EDT	Ramos; Ramos; Ramos; J. Rivera 88'		63'	Stadium: Juan Ramón Loubriel Stadium

== Squad statistics ==
As of match played October 29, 2016

=== Appearances and goals ===
No.	Pos	Nat	Player	Total		NASL Fall Season	
No.	Pos	Nat	Player	Apps	Goals	Apps	Goals
2	DF	(Brazil) BRA	Cristiano	21	0	21	0
3	DF	(Colombia) COL	Camilo Botero	6	0	2+4	0
4	DF	(Costa Rica) CRC	Rudy Dawson	20	0	19+1	0
5	DF	(Spain) ESP	Ramón Soria	21	0	21	0
6	MF	(United States) USA	Conor Agnew	6	0	1+5	0
8	MF	(Guyana) GUY	Chris Nurse	14	0	12+2	0
9	MF	(Brazil) BRA	Pedro	12	0	6+6	0
10	MF	(Puerto Rico) PUR	Joseph Marrero	16	1	9+7	1
11	MF	(Brazil) BRA	Paulo	21	1	17+4	1
12	DF	(United States) USA	Ramon Martin Del Campo	16	0	16	0
13	DF	(United States) USA	Kyle Culbertson	15	1	12+3	1
14	FW	(United States) USA	Brian Bement	13	0	5+8	0
16	FW	(Mexico) MEX	David Eduardo López	5	0	1+4	0
17	FW	(Brazil) BRA	Oliver	9	1	9	1
18	GK	(United States) USA	Trevor Spangenberg	12	0	12	0
19	MF	(Puerto Rico) PUR	Jorge Rivera	9	0	4+5	0
20	FW	(Puerto Rico) PUR	Héctor Ramos	19	8	19	8
21	MF	(Ghana) GHA	Michael Kafari	15	0	15	0
22	MF	(Ghana) GHA	Evans Frimpong	3	0	1+2	0
23	FW	(United States) USA	Sidney Rivera	16	3	9+7	3
24	GK	(United States) USA	David Meves	10	0	10	0
26	FW	(Montenegro) MNE	Bljedi Bardic	3	1	1+2	1
29	MF	(United States) USA	Tyler Rudy	21	2	20+1	2
Players who appeared for Puerto Rico who left the club during the season:

=== Goal scorers ===
Place	Position	Nation	Number	Name	NASL Fall Season	Total
1	FW	(Puerto Rico)	20	Héctor Ramos	8	8
2	FW	(United States)	23	Sidney Rivera	3	3
3	MF	(United States)	29	Tyler Rudy	2	2
4	MF	(Brazil)	11	Paulo	1	1
4	MF	(Puerto Rico)	10	Joseph Marrero	1	1
4	DF	(United States)	13	Kyle Culbertson	1	1
4	FW	(Brazil)	17	Oliver	1	1
4	FW	(Montenegro)	26	Bljedi Bardic	1	1
4				Own goal	1	1
TOTALS					19	19

=== Disciplinary record ===
Number	Nation	Position	Name	NASL Fall Season		Total	
Number	Nation	Position	Name	Booked	Sent off (straight red)	Booked	Sent off (straight red)
2	(Brazil)	DF	Cristiano	2	0	2	0
4	(Costa Rica)	DF	Rudy Dawson	3	1	3	1
5	(Spain)	DF	Ramón Soria	3	0	3	0
8	(Guyana)	MF	Chris Nurse	4	0	4	0
9	(Brazil)	MF	Pedro	1	0	1	0
10	(Puerto Rico)	MF	Joseph Marrero	2	0	2	0
11	(Brazil)	MF	Paulo	2	0	2	0
12	(United States)	DF	Ramón Del Campo	3	0	3	0
13	(United States)	DF	Kyle Culbertson	3	0	3	0
17	(Brazil)	FW	Oliver	3	1	3	1
18	(United States)	GK	Trevor Spangenberg	1	0	1	0
19	(Puerto Rico)	FW	Jorge Rivera	1	0	1	0
20	(Puerto Rico)	FW	Héctor Ramos	2	0	2	0
21	(Ghana)	MF	Michael Kafari	3	0	3	0
23	(United States)	FW	Sidney Rivera	2	0	2	0
29	(United States)	MF	Tyler Rudy	4	0	4	0
			TOTALS	39	2	39	2
