= Clásico de Fútbol =

- Teams: Puerto Rico FC; Puerto Rico national football team
- First meeting: June 11, 2016
- Latest meeting: June 11, 2016

Statistics
- Total meetings: 1
- Most wins: 1 (Puerto Rico FC)
- Largest victory: 1-0
- Longest win streak: 1

The Clásico de Fútbol is a series of games between Puerto Rico FC (NASL) and the Puerto Rico national football team with both teams are based in Puerto Rico. The term "Clásico" is commonly used to refer to other rivalries in Spanish-speaking countries, most prominently, the Spanish Clásico between Barcelona and Real Madrid, or the Argentine Superclásico between Boca Juniors and River Plate.

== History ==
=== Founding 2016 - Present ===
As part of the Puerto Rican Day Parade weekend celebration, Puerto Rico FC will travel to New York City to meet the Puerto Rico National Team in a friendly match. This match is part of PRFC’s ongoing preseason and build up to their inaugural match at the Juan Ramón Loubriel Stadium next July 2 in Bayamón, PR.

The Puerto Rico National Team has been in a hot streak with a record of 3-1 in their last four official matches. Last week they won both of their matches in the CFU Caribbean Cup in dramatic fashion. They defeated Granada in their own house by coming back from a 3-0 deficit and winning in penalty kicks. Then, they hosted Antigua and Barbuda, a match won by the Puerto Rican side with a goal from Héctor “Pito” Ramos at the 114th minute. PRFC’S own Joseph “Jackie” Marrero and Jorge Rivera will play for the Puerto Rican side as they did in the Caribbean Cup.

The festivities began with Carmelo greeting both teams and posing for pictures just before kick-off. The starting XI for PRFC were: Trevor Spangenberg; Kyle Culbertson, Rudy Dawson, Cristiano Dias (c), Ramón Martin del Campo; Tyler Rudy, Ramón Soria; Joseph Marrero, Oliver Minatel; Héctor Ramos and Sidney Rivera.

Puerto Rico FC looked great controlling the ball for the majority of the game against a hungry Puerto Rico National Team. Despite the physical style of the National Team, Puerto Rico FC broke through for a goal in the 12th minute by Joseph “Jackie” Marrero, who played the first half for the club and then switched at halftime to the National Team. Jorge Rivera did the opposite by starting the game for the National Team and then entered the second half for PRFC. This was also the first time Héctor “Pito” Ramos wore PRFC’s colors.

“This game was about getting in touch with the Puerto Rican culture that is here. That is very important to us. It’s another step in the right direction for our preseason and our fitness. We’re very happy that we got another 90 minutes under our belt.”, said Adrian Whitbread after the game to Empire of Soccer.

Despite a late push by the National Team, PRFC held on to the lead and won the first ever Clásico de Fútbol 1-0.

== Clásico de Fútbol All-time game results ==
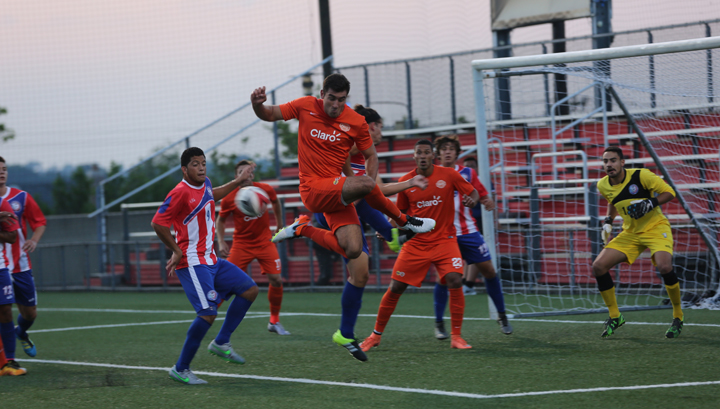
PRFC player

PRFC Win PRNT Win Draw

#	Date	Venue	Score	Competition	Attendance	Series	Ref.
1.	June 11, 2016	Belson Stadium - Queens, New York	1–0	NASL Pre-Season Open-Door Friendly		PRFC 1–0	

PRFC wins	Draws	PRNT wins
1	0	0

== Top goalscorers ==
Position	Name	Team	Goals
1	(Puerto Rico) Joseph Marrero	Puerto Rico FC - 1 Puerto Rico NT. - 0	1
