= Jairo Puerto =

Honduran footballer (born 1988)

Personal information
- Full name: Jairo Daniel Puerto Herrera
- Date of birth: December 28, 1988 (age 37)
- Place of birth: Santa Ana, Francisco Morazán, Honduras
- Height: 1.70 m (5 ft 7 in)
- Position: Winger

Senior career*
Years	Team	Apps	(Gls)
2009–2012	Real España	60	(5)
2013	Olimpia	10	(1)
2014–2016	Marathón	97	(10)
2017	Honduras Progreso	5	(0)
2017–2018	Puerto Rico FC	22	(3)
2018–2019	Real España	29	(2)
2019–2020	Vida	19	(0)
2021	Honduras Progreso	15	(0)

International career
2015–2017	Honduras	6	(1)
- * Club domestic league appearances and goals

Jairo Daniel Puerto Herrera (born December 28, 1988) is a Honduran football player who currently plays as a forward.

== Club career ==
In early 2017, Puerto joined Liga Nacional de Fútbol side Honduras Progresso, but was only there long enough to play 5 games before joining Puerto Rico's Puerto Rico FC of the NASL, where he signed a two-year contract. He made his debut on 26 March 2017 against the New York Cosmos.

== International career ==
Puerto was first called up to the Honduras senior side in 2015, for a friendly game against Cuba.

National team	Year	Apps	Goals
Honduras	2015	1	0
Honduras	2016	0	0
Honduras	2017	5	1
Total		6	1

=== International goals ===
Scores and results list Honduras' goal tally first.

No	Date	Venue	Opponent	Score	Result	Competition
1.	27 May 2017	RFK Stadium, Washington, D.C., United States	El Salvador	1–0	2–2	Friendly
