= Billy Thompson (soccer, born 1990) =

American soccer player

Personal information
- Full name: William Aaron Thompson
- Date of birth: October 22, 1990 (age 36)
- Place of birth: Orange, California, United States
- Height: 1.98 m (6 ft 6 in)
- Position: Goalkeeper

Youth career
- LA Galaxy

College career
Years	Team	Apps	(Gls)
2009–2013	Loyola Marymount Lions		

Senior career*
Years	Team	Apps	(Gls)
2010	Des Moines Menace	3	(0)
2012	Pali Blues	2	(0)
2013–2014	FC Tucson	14	(0)
2015	Orange County Blues	2	(0)
2016	Colorado Springs Switchbacks	3	(0)
2017	Puerto Rico FC	0	(0)
2017	→ Bayamon FC (loan)	0	(0)
- * Club domestic league appearances and goals as of October 1, 2016

William Aaron Thompson (born October 22, 1990) is an American soccer player who most recently played for Puerto Rico FC in the North American Soccer League.

== Career ==
=== Youth and college ===
Thompson played five years of college soccer at Loyola Marymount University including a red-shirted year in 2009.

While at college. Thompson appeared for USL PDL sides Des Moines Menace, Pali Blues and FC Tucson. After graduating, Thompson also spent 2014 with FC Tucson, where he won 2014 PDL Goalkeeper of the Year.

=== Professional ===
Thompson signed with United Soccer League club Orange County Blues on March 20, 2015.

=== Colorado Springs Switchbacks ===
Thompson moved to Colorado Springs Switchbacks on January 28, 2016. Thompson made his debut for the Colorado Springs Switchbacks in a 2-1 friendly victory over Air Force Academy Soccer team.

=== Puerto Rico FC ===
On March 2, 2017, Thompson signed with North American Soccer League side Puerto Rico FC. He was released at the end of the 2017 season.
