= Hiroki Kobayashi (footballer, born 1992) =

Japanese footballer

Personal information
- Date of birth: December 26, 1992 (age 33)
- Place of birth: Okazaki, Aichi, Japan
- Height: 1.83 m (6 ft 0 in)
- Position: Forward

Team information
- Current team: Kitsap Pumas
- Number: 17

Youth career
- 2008–2011: Everton FC Westchester

College career
Years	Team	Apps	(Gls)
2011–2014	Harvard Crimson	61	(7)

Senior career*
Years	Team	Apps	(Gls)
2015–	Kitsap Pumas	4	(0)
2015	→ Seattle Sounders FC 2 (loan)	1	(0)
- * Club domestic league appearances and goals as of August 9, 2015

Hiroki Kobayashi (born December 29, 1992) is a Japanese footballer who currently plays for Kitsap Pumas in the Premier Development League.

== Career ==
=== College ===
Kobayashi spent his entire college career at Harvard University. He made a total of 61 appearances for the Crimson and tallied seven goals and four assists.

=== Professional ===
On March 14, 2015, Kobayashi joined PDL club Kitsap Pumas for the 2015. He made his debut for the club on June 14 in a 1–0 victory over Puget Sound Gunners FC. On June 25, Kobayashi, along with Nick Hamer and Mike Ramos, was loaned to USL club Seattle Sounders FC 2. He made his professional debut that same night in a 1–0 victory over Real Monarchs SLC.
