= Mike Ramos (footballer) =

Puerto Rican international footballer (born 1991)

Personal information
- Full name: Michael Anthony Ramos
- Date of birth: January 29, 1991 (age 35)
- Place of birth: Spokane, Washington, United States
- Height: 1.85 m (6 ft 1 in)
- Positions: Midfielder; forward

Team information
- Current team: Tacoma Stars
- Number: 25

Youth career
- 2005–2008: River City Seely

College career
Years	Team	Apps	(Gls)
2009–2010	Walla Walla Warriors		
2011	Seattle Redhawks	15	(2)
2014	Whitworth Pirates	20	(15)

Senior career*
Years	Team	Apps	(Gls)
2014	Spokane Shadow		(11)
2015–2016	Kitsap Pumas	11	(3)
2015	→ Seattle Sounders FC 2 (loan)	1	(0)
2016–2017	Tacoma Stars (indoor)	19	(14)
2017	Puerto Rico FC	11	(0)
2018–2019	Spokane Shadow	11	(6)
2018–	Tacoma Stars (indoor)	130	(112)

International career^{‡}
2016–2018	Puerto Rico	8	(1)
2016–	United States arena		
- * Club domestic league appearances and goals as of 5 February 2025 ‡ National team caps and goals as of 5 February 2025

Michael Anthony Ramos (born January 29, 1991) is a Puerto Rican international footballer who currently plays for the Tacoma Stars in the Major Arena Soccer League.

== Career ==
=== College ===
Ramos began his career at Walla Walla Community College before transferring to Seattle University where he made 17 appearances for the Redhawks and tallied two goals and five assists in 2011. After the 2011 season, he stepped away from the game for a couple years for personal reasons. In 2014, Ramos decided to reenroll in school and attend Whitworth University. In his only season with the Pirates, he made 21 appearances and led the team with 12 goals and 10 assists.

=== Professional ===
On January 20, 2015, Ramos was drafted in the third round (50th overall) of the 2015 MLS SuperDraft by Toronto FC. Despite an impressive preseason, he was unable to sign with the club after contract negotiations fell through.

On May 9, Ramos joined PDL side Kitsap Pumas. He made his debut a week later in a 2–0 victory over Lane United FC. On June 25, Ramos, along with Nick Hamer and Hiroki Kobayashi, was loaned to USL club Seattle Sounders FC 2. He made his professional debut that same night in a 1–0 victory over Real Monarchs.

On March 7, 2017, Ramos was announced as a new player for Puerto Rico Football Club that currently plays in the North American Soccer League.

=== International ===
Ramos made his debut with the Puerto Rico National football team in September 2016 on three Friendly games against Dominican Republic and India. The following month he played on the Caribbean Cup and scored his first goal against Curaçao in a match where Puerto Rico lost and failed to reach the CONCACAF Gold Cup.

=== International goals ===
Scores and results list Puerto Rico's goal tally first.

No	Date	Venue	Opponent	Score	Result	Competition
1.	11 October 2016	Juan Ramón Loubriel Stadium, Bayamón, Puerto Rico	Curaçao	2–0	2–4	2017 Caribbean Cup qualification
