= Puerto Rico MLS-USL Challenge =

The Puerto Rico USL-MLS Challenge was a preseason invitational football tournament featuring the host club Puerto Rico Islanders, two clubs from Major League Soccer and a USL First Division club. The tournament was played in Juan Ramón Loubriel Stadium in Bayamon, Puerto Rico. The first edition featured the MLS clubs: Los Angeles Galaxy and F.C. Dallas, and USL clubs: Puerto Rico Islanders and Rochester Rhinos. Los Angeles Galaxy won the tournament after 2-1 win over the Puerto Rico Islanders. The tournament was again celebrated in 2009 featuring only a match between MLS club D.C. United and the Puerto Rico Islanders. D.C. United won the tournament after a 2-1 win.

== 2007 ==
- Winners -LA Galaxy

== 2009 ==
| Match | Date | Location | Winners | Score | Runners up |
|---|---|---|---|---|---|
| 5 | February 21, 2009 | Bayamón, Puerto Rico | D.C. United | 2–1 | Puerto Rico Islanders |
