= Pedro Mendes (footballer, born May 1990) =

Brazilian footballer

Personal information
- Full name: Pedro Ferreira-Mendes
- Date of birth: May 13, 1990 (age 36)
- Place of birth: Goiânia, Brazil
- Height: 1.83 m (6 ft 0 in)
- Position: Forward

Youth career
- 2009: Foothill College

Senior career*
Years	Team	Apps	(Gls)
2010–2011	DV8 Defenders	66	(16)
2012	Rhode Island Reds	2	(3)
2012	Cal FC		
2012–2013	Atlanta Silverbacks	33	(12)
2014	Indy Eleven	12	(0)
2014	Minnesota United FC	1	(0)
2015	Atlanta Silverbacks	19	(7)
2016	Puerto Rico FC	12	(0)
- * Club domestic league appearances and goals as of 22 November 2016

Pedro Ferreira-Mendes (born May 13, 1990) is a Brazilian footballer who most recently played for Puerto Rico FC of the North American Soccer League. He has previously played for the Atlanta Silverbacks, Indy Eleven, and Minnesota United FC in the NASL.

== Career ==
=== Club ===
In December 2013, Mendes signed for North American Soccer League side Indy Eleven. On August 15, 2014, Ferreira-Mendes moved from Indy Eleven to fellow NASL side Minnesota United FC. On July 8, 2015, Mendes signed, along with his twin brother Paulo, with the Atlanta Silverbacks.

Mendes was released by Puerto Rico FC at the end of their 2016 season.

== Career statistics ==
=== Club ===
As of match played 8 October 2016

Appearances and goals by club, season and competition
Club	Season	League			National Cup		Other		Total	
Club	Season	Division	Apps	Goals	Apps	Goals	Apps	Goals	Apps	Goals
Cal FC	2012	USASA			2	1	–		2	1
Atlanta Silverbacks	2012	NASL	8	4	0	0	-		8	4
Atlanta Silverbacks	2013	NASL	25	8	1	0	-		26	8
Atlanta Silverbacks	Total		33	12	1	0	-	-	34	12
Indy Eleven	2014	NASL	12	0	2	0	-		14	0
Minnesota United	2014	NASL	1	0	0	0	-		1	0
Atlanta Silverbacks	2015	NASL	19	7	0	0	-		19	7
Puerto Rico FC	2016	NASL	12	0	0	0	-		12	7
Career total			77	19	5	1	-	-	82	20
