= Michael Kafari =

Ghanaian footballer (born 1991)

Personal information
- Date of birth: October 30, 1991 (age 34)
- Place of birth: Accra, Ghana
- Height: 1.86 m (6 ft 1 in)
- Position: Defensive midfielder

College career
| Years | Team | Apps | (Gls) |
| 2010–2013 | New Mexico Lobos | 82 | (3) |

Senior career*
| Years | Team | Apps | (Gls) |
| 2012 | Austin Aztex | 2 | (0) |
| 2014 | Charleston Battery | 0 | (0) |
| 2014 | Sporting Kansas City | 0 | (0) |
| 2016–2017 | Puerto Rico FC | 32 | (0) |
| 2018–2019 | Motala | | |
| 2019 | ASC San Diego | 3 | (0) |
| 2019 | New York Cosmos | 6 | (0) |
| 2020 | Detroit City | 8 | (1) |
| 2021 | New Amsterdam | 7 | (0) |
| 2021 | Chicago House | 14 | (0) |
| 2022 | AC Syracuse Pulse | 19 | (0) |
- * Club domestic league appearances and goals as of 9 November 2023

Michael Kafari (born October 30, 1991) is a Ghanaian footballer who plays as a defensive midfielder.

== Career ==
=== College and amateur ===
Kafari played college soccer at the University of New Mexico between 2010 and 2013.

While at college, Kafari appeared for Premier Development League side Austin Aztex in 2012.

=== Professional ===
Vancouver Whitecaps FC selected Kafari in the third round (No. 51 overall) of the 2014 MLS SuperDraft. However, he wasn't signed by the club, instead joining USL Pro side Charleston Battery.

Kafari left Charleston without making a league appearance, but was later signed by Major League Soccer side Sporting Kansas City.

After two years away from the professional game, Kafari signed with North American Soccer League side Puerto Rico FC in July 2016. He was released at the end of the 2017 season.

On 22 April 2018, Kafari joined Swedish fourth-tier club Motala.

On 27 August 2019, he joined New York Cosmos.

In April 2021, Kafari joined National Independent Soccer Association side New Amsterdam FC ahead of the spring 2021 season. He went on to play in all three of New Amsterdam's matches during the NISA Legends Cup and appeared in seven of the team's eight regular season games.
