= Evans Frimpong =

American soccer player

Personal information
- Full name: Evans Frimpong
- Date of birth: August 8, 1989 (age 37)
- Place of birth: Accra, Ghana
- Height: 1.77 m (5 ft 10 in)
- Position: Winger

Youth career
- –2008: Liberty Babies FC

College career
Years	Team	Apps	(Gls)
2008–2009	Texas–Brownsville Scorpions		
2010–2011	Delaware Fightin' Blue Hens		

Senior career*
Years	Team	Apps	(Gls)
2009–2011	Reading United	24	(5)
2012–2014	Tampa Bay Rowdies	56	(9)
2015	Fort Lauderdale Strikers	12	(0)
2016	Oklahoma City Energy	6	(0)
2016	Puerto Rico FC	3	(0)
2016–2017	Al-Najma	12	(3)
2017	Jarota Jarocin	6	(0)
2019–2020	Detroit City	5	(0)
2021–2022	Tropics SC		
2021–2022	Florida Tropics (indoor)	0	(0)

Managerial career
- 2022: Tropics SC
- 2023–: Swan City SC (assistant)
- * Club domestic league appearances and goals

Evans Frimpong (born August 8, 1989) is a Ghanaian former professional footballer who is currently an assistant coach with USL League Two club Swan City SC.

== Career ==
=== Youth ===
Frimpong began his youth career playing for Liberty Babies FC alongside Kwadwo Asamoah of Juventus FC, Rabiu Mohammed, Abdul Aziz Tetteh of Lech Poznań and Daniel Agyei. He captained the team at the 2008 Gothia Cup in Sweden where they were runners up, losing to IF Elfsborg in the final. Frimpong also made the shortlist for Ghana's 2007 national U-17 football team .

=== College and amateur ===
Frimpong played college soccer at UTB between 2008 and 2009 before transferring to the University of Delaware, where he played between 2010 and 2011.

Among the honors Frimpong received in 2011 were second team National Soccer Coaches Association of America All-American, first team NSCAA All-South Atlantic Region, Hermann Trophy (National Player of the Year) final 15 semifinalist, CAA Player of the Year and ECAC All-East first team. He ranked among the CAA leaders in scoring, tallying 29 points on 12 goals and five assists in 2011. Overall, he tallied 15 goals during his two-year college career with the Blue Hens.

=== Professional ===
Chicago Fire selected Frimpong in the first round (No. 9 overall) of the 2012 MLS Supplemental Draft. However, after a brief stint with the club, he was traded to San Jose Earthquakes where he completed his pre-season.

Frimpong joined North American Soccer League club Tampa Bay Rowdies on May 2, 2012, and played a major role in their successful quest to hoist the Soccer Bowl trophy that same year. He signed a two-year contract to stay with the club until the end of the 2014 season. Frimpong finished his 2013 campaign with six goals and in the 2014 season, he scored three goals including a double against New York Cosmos in a performance which earned him a spot on the North American Soccer League team of the week. In 2015, Frimpong joined the Rowdies' archrivals Fort Lauderdale Strikers and helped them to the NASL playoffs with brilliant performances in key games, most notably against his former team, the Tampa Bay Rowdies, where he delivered the game winning assist to lead the strikers to capture the 2015 Coastal Cup. After a season with the Strikers, he went to Vendsyssel FF in Denmark for trials but later signed with Oklahoma City Energy FC on February 1 for the 2016 season. Frimpong is a versatile player and a clinical finisher when playing in the forward position. His best attributes are speed, aggression, technical dribbling ability and near perfect ball control.

Frimpong was released by Puerto Rico at the end of the 2016 fall season.

Frimpong was signed to Al-najma in 2016 and scored 3 goals in 12 matches for the side, playing an instrumental role in keeping them from relegation that season.

On October 19, 2017, Frimpong signed for Polish club Jarota Jarocin.

In 2019, Frimpong joined the newly-professional Detroit City FC of the National Independent Soccer Association.
