= David Meves =

American soccer player

Personal information
- Full name: David Meves
- Date of birth: 20 July 1990 (age 36)
- Place of birth: Arlington Heights, Illinois, United States
- Height: 6 ft 1 in (1.85 m)
- Position: Goalkeeper

College career
Years	Team	Apps	(Gls)
2009–2012	Akron Zips		

Senior career*
Years	Team	Apps	(Gls)
2010–2012	Chicago Fire Premier	24	(0)
2013	Portland Timbers U23s	13	(0)
2014	Des Moines Menace	6	(0)
2014–2015	Fort Lauderdale Strikers	5	(0)
2016	Puerto Rico FC	10	(0)
- * Club domestic league appearances and goals as of November 22, 2016

David Meves (born July 20, 1990) is an American professional soccer player who plays as a goalkeeper, most recently for Puerto Rico FC of the North American Soccer League.

== Career ==
=== College and Youth ===
Meves played four years of college soccer at the University of Akron between 2009 and 2012.

While at college, Meves also appeared for USL PDL club Chicago Fire Premier from 2010 to 2012.

=== Professional ===
On January 22, 2013, Meves was selected 3rd overall in the 2013 MLS Supplemental Draft by Portland Timbers. Meves wasn't signed by Portland and spent time with Portland Timbers U23s in 2013.

Meves played with USL PDL club Des Moines Menace in 2014, before signing with North American Soccer League club Fort Lauderdale Strikers on July 10, 2014. Meves earned the starting job for the Strikers in 2015 before being sidelined by a broken jaw.

Meves joined NASL expansion team Puerto Rico FC on March 10, 2016.

Meves was released by Puerto Rico at the end of their 2016 season.
