= Trevor Spangenberg =

American professional soccer player (born 1991)

Personal information
- Full name: Trevor Matthew Spangenberg
- Date of birth: April 21, 1991 (age 35)
- Place of birth: Mesa, Arizona, United States
- Height: 6 ft 2 in (1.88 m)
- Position: Goalkeeper

College career
Years	Team	Apps	(Gls)
2009–2013	Missouri State Bears	38	(0)

Senior career*
Years	Team	Apps	(Gls)
2010	Laredo Heat	2	(0)
2012–2013	Springfield Demize	20	(0)
2014	Chivas USA	1	(0)
2015	New England Revolution	0	(0)
2015	→ Richmond Kickers (loan)	2	(0)
2016–2017	Puerto Rico FC	33	(0)
2018	Richmond Kickers	15	(0)
2019–2025	Birmingham Legion	33	(0)
- * Club domestic league appearances and goals as of October 25, 2025

Trevor Matthew Spangenberg (born April 21, 1991) is an American professional soccer player who plays as a goalkeeper.

== Career ==
=== Early career ===
Spangenberg played five years of college soccer at Missouri State University between 2009 and 2013, including a red-shirted year in 2009. While at college, Spangenberg appeared for USL PDL club Laredo Heat in 2010 and Springfield Demize in 2012 and 2013.

=== Chivas USA ===
On March 9, 2014, Spangenberg signed with Major League Soccer club Chivas USA.

=== New England Revolution ===
Following the dissolution of Chivas USA, Spangenberg signed with the New England Revolution ahead of the 2015 season. He was then sent on loan to the Richmond Kickers, a USL team who is partners with MLS club D.C. United. Spangenberg was released by New England at the end of their 2015 season.

=== Puerto Rico FC ===
Spangenberg became the second goalkeeper signed by NASL expansion club Puerto Rico FC on April 6, 2016.

After 10 matches in the 2016 fall season Trevor Spangenberg was given the chance to start at goalie against the league leaders FC Edmonton on the road. He and the team was able to keep the game scoreless. After a spectacular performance against Miami FC the job was his to keep. The 25-year-old keeper had a goals allowed average of 1.2 and five shut outs in 12 starts.

On January 23, 2017, Puerto Rico FC announced the return of five regulars from the 2016 starting XI. Spangenberg performances towards the end of the season led to his option being picked up by the club. He was released at the end of the 2017 season.

=== Richmond Kickers ===
On February 28, 2018, Spangenberg signed with USL side Richmond Kickers for the 2018 season.

== Career statistics ==
As of May 22, 2019

Club	Season	League			Playoffs (Note: Appearance in the PDL Playoffs)		Cup (Note: Includes the Copa Luis Villarejo and U.S. Open Cup)		Continental (Note: All appearances in the Caribbean Club Championship)		Total	
Club	Season	Division	Apps	Goals	Apps	Goals	Apps	Goals	Apps	Goals	Apps	Goals
Laredo Heat	2010	PDL	2	0	1	0	–		–		3	0
Springfield Demize	2012	PDL	9	0	–		–		–		9	0
Springfield Demize	2013	PDL	11	0	–		–		–		11	0
Springfield Demize	Total		20	0	0	0	0	0	0	0	20	0
Chivas USA	2014	MLS	1	0	–		0	0	–		1	0
New England Revolution	2015	MLS	0	0	0	0	0	0	–		0	0
Richmond Kickers (loan)	2015	USL	2	0	0	0	0	0	–		2	0
Puerto Rico FC	2016	NASL	12	0	–		5	0	–		17	0
Puerto Rico FC	2017	NASL	21	0	–		–		2	0	23	0
Puerto Rico FC	Total		33	0	0	0	5	0	2	0	40	0
Richmond Kickers	2018	USL	15	0	–		3	0	–		18	0
Birmingham Legion	2019	USL Championship	5	0	0	0	1	0	–		6	0
Career total			78	0	1	0	9	0	2	0	90	0
