= Rudy Dawson =

Costa Rican football player (born 1988)

Personal information
- Full name: Rudy Anthony Dawson Forbes
- Date of birth: 8 May 1988 (age 38)
- Place of birth: Limón, Costa Rica
- Height: 1.88 m (6 ft 2 in)
- Position: Defender

Senior career*
| Years | Team | Apps | (Gls) |
| 2008–2010 | Alajuelense | | |
| 2012–2016 | C.S. Uruguay | 137 | (3) |
| 2016–2017 | Puerto Rico FC | 35 | (1) |
| 2018–2020 | San Carlos | 65 | (1) |
| 2021– | Sporting San Jose | 5 | (0) |

International career
- Costa Rica U17
- Costa Rica U20
- * Club domestic league appearances and goals as of 31 January 2021

Rudy Anthony Dawson Forbes (born May 8, 1988) is a Costa Rican professional soccer player for Sporting San Jose.

== Career ==
=== Club ===
==== Puerto Rico FC ====
In May 2016, Dawson signed with NASL side Puerto Rico FC. He was released at the end of the 2017 season.

== Career statistics ==
As of match played 29 October 2016

Appearances and goals by club, season and competition
| Club | Season | League | | | National Cup | | Other | | Total | |
| Club | Season | Division | Apps | Goals | Apps | Goals | Apps | Goals | Apps | Goals |
|---|---|---|---|---|---|---|---|---|---|---|
| Uruguay | 2012–13 | Costa Rican Primera División | 36 | 2 | – | | – | | 3 | 0 |
| Uruguay | 2013–14 | Costa Rican Primera División | 37 | 1 | – | | – | | 3 | 0 |
| Uruguay | 2014–15 | Costa Rican Primera División | 38 | 0 | – | | – | | 3 | 0 |
| Uruguay | 2015–16 | Costa Rican Primera División | 26 | 0 | – | | – | | 3 | 0 |
| Uruguay | Total | | 137 | 3 | - | - | - | - | 137 | 0 |
| Puerto Rico FC | 2016 | NASL | 20 | 0 | – | | – | | 20 | 0 |
