= Joseph Marrero =

Puerto Rican association football player

Personal information
- Full name: Joseph Yamil Marrero García
- Date of birth: April 9, 1993 (age 33)
- Place of birth: San Juan, Puerto Rico
- Height: 1.70 m (5 ft 7 in)
- Position: Attacking midfielder

Team information
- Current team: Metropolitan FA
- Number: 10

Senior career*
Years	Team	Apps	(Gls)
2011	Conquistadores de Guaynabo		
2012	Puerto Rico Islanders	2	(0)
2013	Academia Quintana		
2013–2014	Kultsu	21	(6)
2015	Criollos de Caguas		
2016–2017	Puerto Rico FC	25	(1)
2018	Academia Quintana San Juan		
2018–2019	Las Piedras		
2019–2026	Academia Quintana San Juan		
2026–	Metropolitan FA		

International career^{‡}
2011–2019	Puerto Rico	27	(4)
- * Club domestic league appearances and goals as of 07:36, 4 July 2021 (UTC) ‡ National team caps and goals as of 07:36, 4 July 2021 (UTC)

Joseph Yamil "Jackie" Marrero García (born April 9, 1993) is a Puerto Rican footballer who plays for Metropolitan FA as a midfielder.

== Career ==
Marrero has played professional football for Conquistadores de Guaynabo, Puerto Rico Islanders, Puerto Rico FC, Academia Quintana and Kultsu. He signed for Metropolitan FA in 2026.

He made his senior international debut for Puerto Rico in 2011, and has appeared in FIFA World Cup qualifying matches.

=== International goals ===
As of February 3, 2017

No	Date	Venue	Opponent	Score	Result	Competition
1.	November 14, 2011	Mayagüez Athletics Stadium, Mayagüez, Puerto Rico	Saint Lucia	3–0	3–0	2014 FIFA World Cup qualification
2.	September 7, 2012	Stade Sylvio Cator, Haiti	Bermuda	1–0	2–1	
3.	September 4, 2014	Juan Ramón Loubriel Stadium, Bayamón, Puerto Rico	Curaçao	1–0	2–2	
4.	September 4, 2014	Juan Ramón Loubriel Stadium, Bayamón, Puerto Rico	Curaçao	2–0	2–2	
