= Kyle Culbertson =

American soccer player

Personal information
- Full name: Kyle Culbertson
- Date of birth: November 3, 1992 (age 33)
- Place of birth: Columbus, Ohio, United States
- Height: 5 ft 11 in (1.80 m)
- Position: Defender

Youth career
- 2009–2011: Columbus Crew

College career
Years	Team	Apps	(Gls)
2011	Akron Zips	0	(0)
2012	Columbia Lions	13	(0)
2013–2015	Ohio State Buckeyes	42	(10)

Senior career*
Years	Team	Apps	(Gls)
2011	Cincinnati Kings	10	(0)
2012	Mississippi Brilla	16	(0)
2015	Charlotte Eagles	11	(2)
2016–2017	Puerto Rico FC	36	(1)
2018	Saint Louis FC	26	(0)
2019	Birmingham Legion	29	(1)
- * Club domestic league appearances and goals as of July 13, 2020

Kyle Culbertson (born November 3, 1992) is an American soccer player who last played as a defender for USL Championship club Birmingham Legion.

== Career ==
Culbertson played college soccer at Akron University, Columbia University and Ohio State University. While playing college soccer, Culbertson also appeared in the USL PDL for Cincinnati Kings, Mississippi Brilla and Charlotte Eagles.

=== Puerto Rico FC ===
After making his way down to Florida, Puerto Rico FC officials described him as "a versatile left-footed player who was highly impressive in the Puerto Rico open try out". Culbertson joined Puerto Rico FC of the North American Soccer League for the club's first season on May 18, 2016. He was released at the end of the 2017 season.

=== Saint Louis FC ===
On December 20, 2017, it was announced that Culbertson would join United Soccer League side Saint Louis FC ahead of their 2018 season.

=== Birmingham Legion ===
On March 7, 2019, Culbertson joined USL side Birmingham Legion ahead of their inaugural season.

=== Family ===
Kyle's parents are David and Sue Culbertson. He is also married to a woman named Morgan with a daughter named Ellie.
