= Bljedi Bardic =

Montenegrin association football player (born 1992)

Personal information
- Full name: Bljedi Bardic
- Date of birth: January 10, 1992 (age 34)
- Place of birth: Bar, SFR Yugoslavia
- Height: 1.85 m (6 ft 1 in)
- Position: Forward

Youth career
- 2008–2010: OFK Bar U17
- 2010–2011: KF Vllaznia U18

Senior career*
Years	Team	Apps	(Gls)
2011–2012	OFK Bar	20	(7)
2013–2016	Clarkstown SC Eagles	64	(84)
2016	Puerto Rico FC	3	(1)
2017–2019	New York Cosmos B	32	(24)
2017	New York Cosmos	10	(2)
2020	New York Cosmos	6	(2)
2021	New Amsterdam	6	(0)
- * Club domestic league appearances and goals as of January 26, 2024

Bljedi Bardic (Albanian: Bledi Bardhi, born 10 January 1992) is a Montenegrin football player who last played for New Amsterdam FC in the National Independent Soccer Association.

Born in Bar, Montenegro, where Bardic played youth football for OFK Bar where he was leading goalscorer. After spending 2 years at OFK Bar youth team, Bardic moved in Shkodër, Albania where he played for KF Vllaznia Shkodër for 1 year. Bardic moved back in Bar and signed his professional contract with Senior Team OFK Bar

== Career ==
=== Professional ===
On 6 September 2011, Bardic signed his first contract with OFK Bar. He played 20 games and scored 7 goals. Bardic continued his career in the United States of America where he signed for Clarkstown SC Eagles of the National Premier Soccer League. With 86 goals, he is the team's all-time leading goal scorer.

On May 27, 2016, Bardic signed for Puerto Rico FC. In his second appearance Bardic scored the winning goal against the Fort Lauderdale Strikers and he was named man of the match.

On January 15, 2021, after four years in the New York Cosmos organization, Bardic signed for New Amsterdam FC of the National Independent Soccer Association.
