= Cristiano Dias =

Brazilian footballer (born 1986)

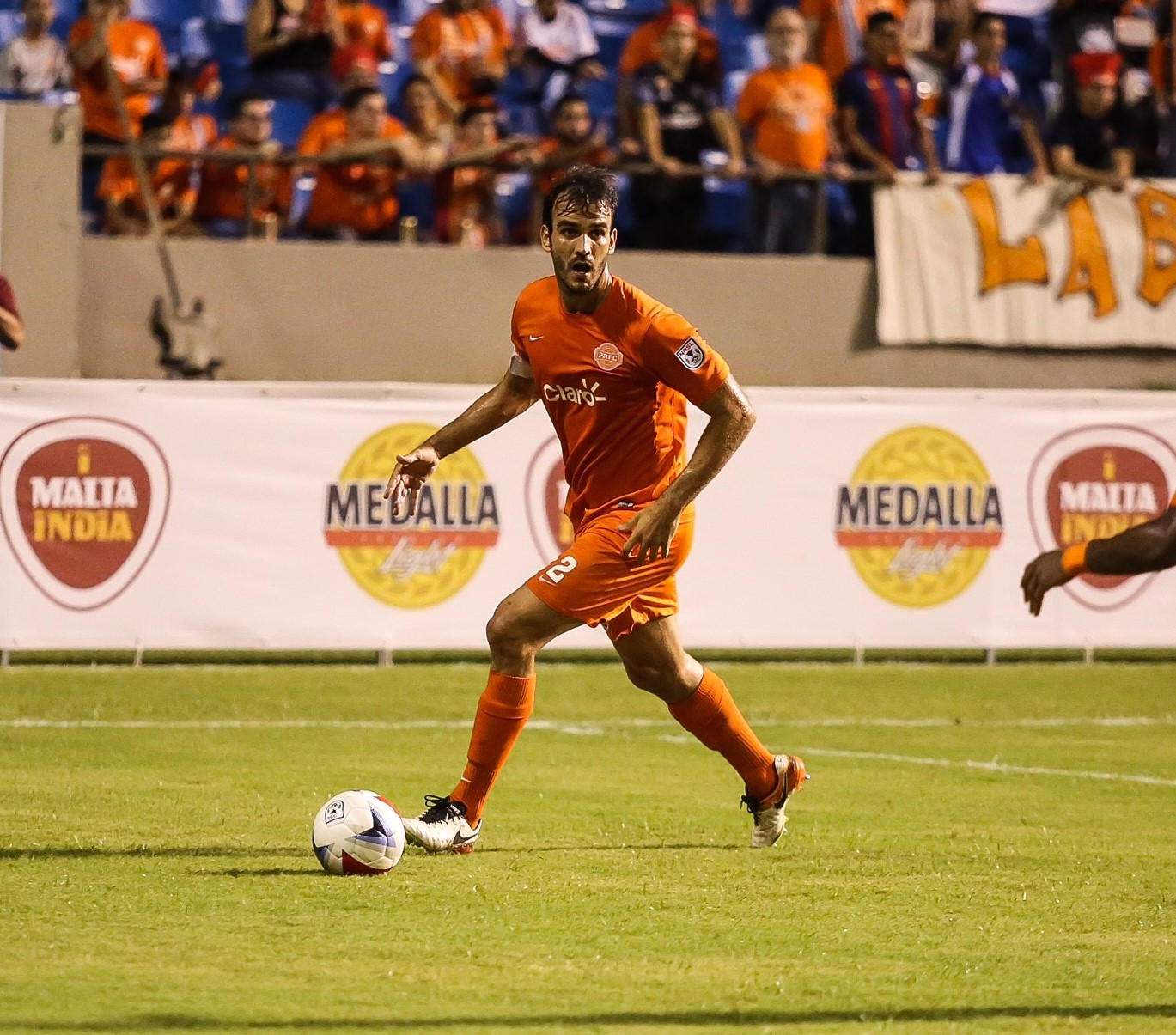

Personal information
- Full name: Cristiano Fagundes Dias
- Date of birth: May 25, 1986 (age 40)
- Place of birth: Machado, Brazil
- Height: 6 ft 2 in (1.88 m)
- Position: Defender

Senior career*
Years	Team	Apps	(Gls)
- São Carlos
- São Bento
- Osasco
- Desportivo Brasil
2007–2010	Miami	79	(1)
2011–2015	Minnesota United	98	(3)
2011–2013	Missouri Comets (indoor)	44	(8)
2016–2017	Puerto Rico FC	39	(3)
- * Club domestic league appearances and goals as of 13:40, 30 October 2017 (UTC)

Cristiano Fagundes Dias (born May 25, 1986), sometimes known as just Cristiano, is a Brazilian footballer who most recently played for Puerto Rico FC in the North American Soccer League.

== Career ==
=== Brazil ===
Cristiano Dias began his playing career in his native Brazil, and has played for several lower-division Brazilian clubs, including São Carlos, São Bento, Osasco, and Desportivo Brasil

=== United States ===
Cristiano Dias signed with Miami FC prior to its inaugural season in the USL First Division in 2007, having previously played for the team's original head coach Chiquinho de Assis, and became a mainstay of the team's defensive line. He played for Miami during four seasons.

On March 22, 2011, Cristiano Dias signed with NSC Minnesota Stars of the North American Soccer League. and also won the NASL championship in the same year being one of the most important player in the Minnesota defensive line.

After nearly 100 appearances with Minnesota United, Cristiano Dias signed with NASL expansion side Puerto Rico FC on March 30, 2016.

== Honours ==
2011 North American Soccer League season Champion with Minnesota United FC

2012 North American Soccer League season Runner Up with Minnesota United FC

2014 North American Soccer League season Spring Season Champion with Minnesota United FC

2016 Copa Luis Villarejo Champion with Puerto Rico FC
