= Tyler Rudy =

American soccer player

Personal information
- Date of birth: September 29, 1993 (age 33)
- Place of birth: Olney, Maryland, United States
- Height: 5 ft 10 in (1.78 m)
- Position: Midfielder

Youth career
- 2009–2011: D.C. United

College career
Years	Team	Apps	(Gls)
2011–2014	Georgetown Hoyas	88	(7)

Senior career*
Years	Team	Apps	(Gls)
2014	Pittsburgh Riverhounds U23	6	(0)
2015	New England Revolution	1	(0)
2015	→ Rochester Rhinos (loan)	14	(0)
2016–2017	Puerto Rico FC	23	(2)
2018	Christos FC	4	(2)
Total		48	(4)
- * Club domestic league appearances and goals as of 10 May 2018

Tyler Rudy (born September 29, 1993) is an American former professional soccer player who played for the New England Revolution and Puerto Rico FC.

== Career ==
=== College and amateur ===
Rudy played four years of college soccer at Georgetown University between 2011 and 2014.

He had seven goals and 12 assists in 88 appearances for the Hoyas while helping them reach the College Cup Final in 2012. Rudy served as a captain for Georgetown as a senior in 2014, earning Second Team All-BIG EAST honors while also being named a BIG EAST All-Academic selection. While still in college, Rudy played for the Pittsburgh Riverhounds U23 of the Premier Development League for the 2014 season. He appeared in six matches for the club, tallying one assist.

=== Professional ===
Rudy signed with MLS side New England Revolution on February 28, 2015. He was loaned to New England's United Soccer League affiliate Rochester Rhinos on April 3, 2015. He appeared in 14 games for the Rochester Rhinos, as they went on to win the 2015 United Soccer League Championship.

On March 30, 2016, Rudy signed with NASL expansion side Puerto Rico FC. He announced his retirement from the game on June 30, 2017.
