= Juan Ramón Loubriel Stadium =

Stadium in Bayamón, Puerto Rico

- JRL; La Islandera
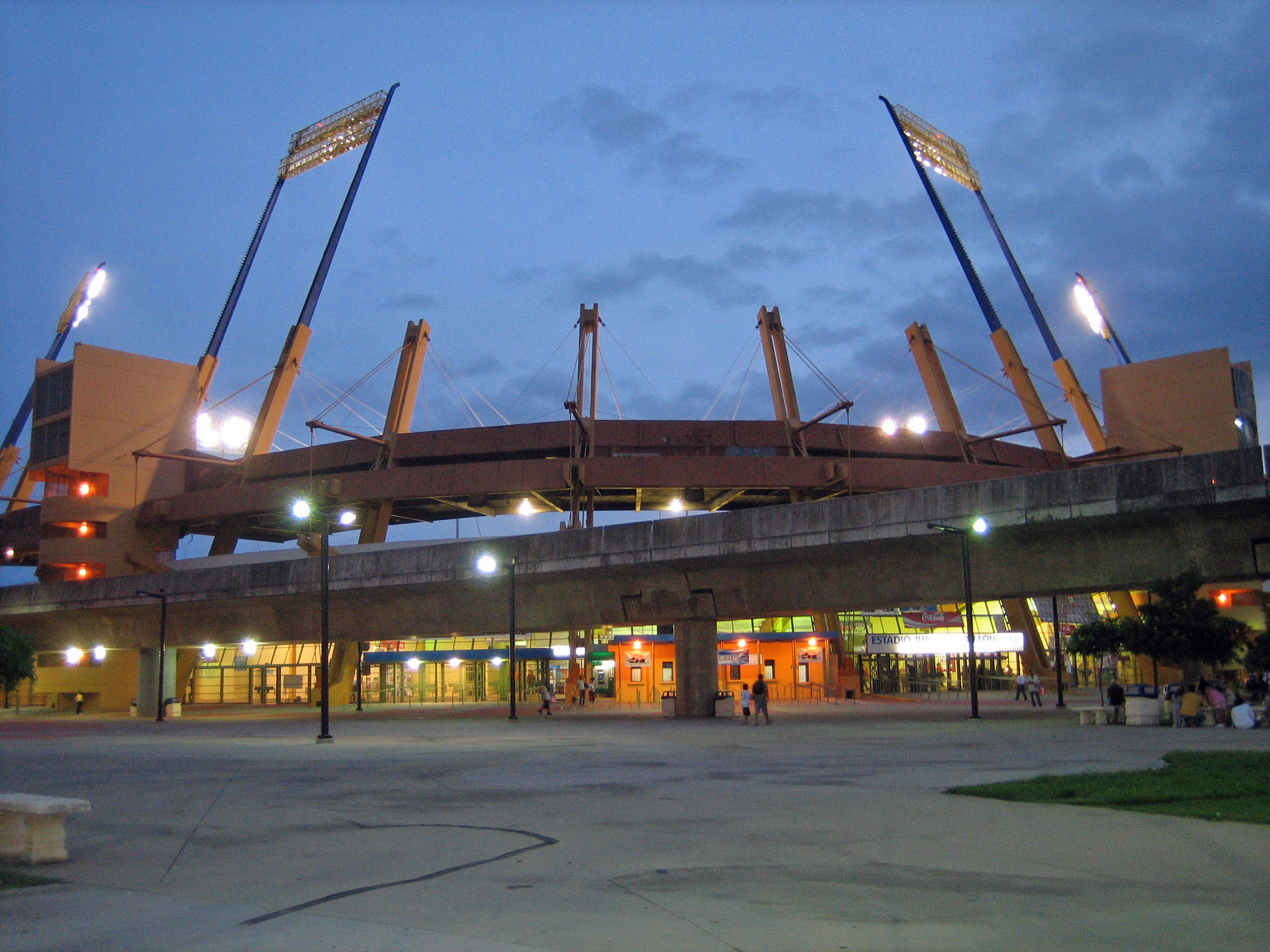
- Front view of the stadium
- Interactive map of Juan Ramón Loubriel Stadium
- Full name: Estadio Juan Ramón Loubriel
- Address: Route 2, intersection with Route 5
- Location: Cerro Gordo, Bayamón, Puerto Rico
- Coordinates: 18.393425°N 66.15085°W
- Owner: Municipio de Bayamón
- Operator: Municipio de Bayamón
- Capacity: 24,000
- Surface: Grass
- Record attendance: 24,000 – Inter Miami FC vs. Independiente del Valle (February 27, 2026)
- Field size: 105 × 68 m

Construction
- Groundbreaking: 1972
- Built: 1973
- Opened: 1974
- Renovated: 2003, 2012
- Cost: Unknown
- Architect: Thomas Marvel

Tenants
- Puerto Rico men's national football team Puerto Rico women's national football team Vaqueros de Bayamón (PRBL) (1974–2003); Cangrejeros de Santurce (PRBL) (late 80s); Puerto Rico Islanders (NASL) (2004–2012); Puerto Rico FC (NASL) (2016–2017); Bayamón FC (2019–); Puerto Rico Bowl (2026–)

Juan Ramón Loubriel Stadium (Spanish: Estadio Juan Ramón Loubriel) is a soccer-specific stadium located in Bayamón, Puerto Rico. It is best known as the former home of the Puerto Rico Islanders of the North American Soccer League and current home of the Bayamón FC of the Liga Puerto Rico. The stadium can seat up to 12,500 people. It can be publicly accessed by the metro station known as "Deportivo Station."

== History ==
Built in 1973 as a baseball stadium with a capacity of 12,500, it was home to the Vaqueros de Bayamón until 2003 when the team became defunct.

=== La Meca of Puerto Rican Football ===
In 2003 with the Vaqueros folding, the stadium seemed doomed to be relegated to a youth stadium or to demolition, but late that same year the stadium became home of the Puerto Rico Islanders. Its "L" shaped stands were not suited for the sport and it originally had an awkward feel to it since the stand behind the goal angles away from the pitch.

Another name that has been used for the stadium is "La Islandera" since it was the home of the Islanders.

It was home to Bayamon FC, a professional football team in the Puerto Rico Soccer League now playing in the Bayamon Soccer Complex, and Sevilla Bayamon FC, now called Sevilla-FC Juncos; they moved to Juncos.

It has also played host to the CFU Club Championship Group C in 2006, where the Islanders played but lost to Trinidad and Tobago, W Connection 0-1 and the Puerto Rico MLS-USL Challenge in 2007, and two 2010 World Cup qualifying matches against the Dominican Republic and Honduras.

==== Renovation in 2012 ====
The renovations to the stadium have been made to upgrade a stadium created for baseball to be soccer-specific. The stadium will also have new dressing rooms and bathrooms and the replacement of some seating. There will also be some temporary bleachers until the addition for new seating is completed later. Lighting has also been adjusted to be more uniform across the field.

The remodeling of the stadium will be done in several stages, with a total cost of $7 million.

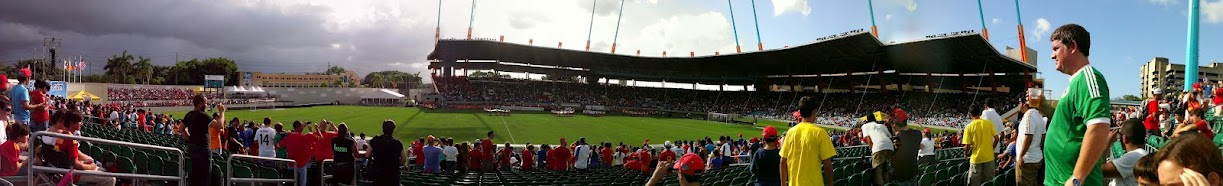
A view of the stadium in 2012 after the first phase of renovation.

=== 2015–2017 ===
In 2015, it was announced home to Puerto Rico FC of the North American Soccer League. The team played in the 2016 North American Soccer League season of Fall season.

On September 22, 2017, the stadium was severely damaged by Hurricane Maria, which led to cancellations of the games and forced Puerto Rico FC to play the next same matches in neutral venues.

=== 2018–present ===
The first match played after Hurricane Maria was a friendly match between Puerto Rico women's national football team and Argentina on September 2, 2018.

On November 19, 2019, it was announced that Bayamón FC will be using the stadium for its home matches of the Liga Puerto Rico.

On February 26, 2026, the stadium hosted a preseason friendly match-up between Inter Miami CF vs. Independiente del Valle which drew a record sold out attendance of 24,000 fans and saw Inter Miami win 2-1 off two goals by Lionel Messi

On May 8, 2026, it was announced that the stadium would be hosting its first American football game when the National Collegiate Athletic Association debuts the Puerto Rico Bowl. The game will be the first NCAA Division I FBS College Football Bowl game held in the Caribbean. The inaugural game is scheduled for December 22, 2026 and will be broadcast live on ESPN.

== Events ==
The first boxing bout between Alfredo Escalera and Alexis Argüello dubbed The Bloody Battle of Bayamon, took place at the stadium on January 28, 1978.

On July 16, 1988, wrestler Bruiser Brody was fatally stabbed in the shower by fellow wrestler Jose Huertas Gonzalez.

On September 26, 1992 the heavy metal band Iron Maiden played on their Fear of the Dark Tour. This was the first time Iron Maiden visited Puerto Rico.

The popstar Madonna performed a sold out concert at the stadium on October 26, 1993 during The Girlie Show World Tour before 38,000 fans.

American pop-singer Michael Jackson planned to perform there in November 1993 as part of his Dangerous World Tour, but the concert was cancelled due to Jackson’s illness

The rock band Aerosmith performed there on January 28, 1994 during their Get a Grip Tour.
