= Puerto Rico FC =

Association football club based in Puerto Rico

- Full name: Puerto Rico Football Club
- Nicknames: La Tropa Naranja ("The Orange Troop"); Naranjas ("Oranges")
- Short name: PRFC
- Founded: June 9, 2015; 11 years ago
- Dissolved: 2017
- Stadium: Juan Ramón Loubriel Stadium; Bayamón, Puerto Rico
- Capacity: 22,000
- Owner: Carmelo Anthony
- President: Vacant
- Head coach: Vacant
- League: North American Soccer League
- 2017: Spring: 8th Fall: 6th Combined: 8th Playoffs: Did not qualify
- Website: www.puertoricofc.com
Home colors	Away colors	Third colors

Puerto Rico FC was a professional soccer club based in Bayamón, Puerto Rico. Founded in 2015, the team played in the North American Soccer League (NASL), the second tier of the American soccer pyramid. The team debuted in the 2016 fall season. The team played its home games at the Juan Ramón Loubriel Stadium until the stadium was severely damaged by Hurricane Maria in September 2017. The team last played during the 2017 NASL season.

== History ==
In June 2015, National Basketball Association (NBA) star Carmelo Anthony announced that he would be bringing soccer back to Puerto Rico with a new North American Soccer League expansion franchise. The announcement took place in Bayamon, Puerto Rico; the future home base of Puerto Rico FC, scheduled to begin its first season at Juan Ramon Loubriel Stadium in the 2016 fall season.

=== 2016 season ===
On August 14, 2015, Adrian Whitbread was announced as the club's inaugural coach, with Thomas Payne being appointed as president on November 10, 2015.

==== North American Soccer League season ====
Puerto Rico FC made their home debut on July 2, 2016, at Juan Ramón Loubriel Stadium, drawing 1–1 to Indy Eleven, in front of a crowd of 6,474. Hector Ramos scored the team's first ever league goal in the 74th minute. Their first victory came against Rayo OKC on July 23, 2016, winning 1–0. They won four of their last seven games to move up from 12th place to 9th, and ended their Fall season with 24 points finishing with a 5–9–8 record.

Puerto Rican international player; Hector Ramos led the team in scoring with 8 goals.

=== 2017 season ===
On January 26, CONCACAF announced PRFC would host group D in the 2017 CFU Club Championship at Juan Ramón Loubriel Stadium starting March 14.

==== CFU Club Championship ====
Their first match in the tournament came against S.V. Transvaal of Suriname; whom they beat 1–0, thanks to Hector Ramos hitting the penalty shot in the 28th minute. The second match up came against Portmore United of Jamaica. They lost 1–0 late in the 88th minute. Shortly before the start of third match, Puerto Rico was eliminated from the tournament due to Portmore United finishing the group stage with three wins from games. PRFC played well defeating Scholars International SC of the Cayman Islands 4–0; with goals coming from debuted Mike Ramos, Sidney Rivera, Brian Bement, Cristiano Dias.

Puerto Rico finished the tournament 2–0–1.

==== North American Soccer League season ====
On May 19, 2017, Puerto Rico FC announced that Adrian Whitbread had been relieved of coaching duties and Neil Sillett as technical director; Marco Velez was named as interim Head Coach.

Tom Payne decided to leave the club at the end of November 2017, rather than renew his contract.

=== Cancellation of 2018 season and hiatus ===
On February 27, 2018, the NASL announced that it had cancelled its upcoming 2018 season, with hopes to return for a 2019 season. While some other NASL clubs decided to join other leagues, Puerto Rico FC has not played since.

Head coach Marco Velez took a job with the Puerto Rico national football team before moving on to coach the Puerto Rico national under-17 football team.

== Crest and colors ==
The team's colors were orange and white.

=== Kit evolution ===
Home and away kits.

- Home

2016–2017

- Away

2016	2017

=== Sponsorship ===
The official kit provider for the club in their first season was Nike.

Season	Kit manufacturer	Shirt sponsor
2016–2017	Nike	Front: Claro; Back: Samsung; Secondary:

== Stadium ==
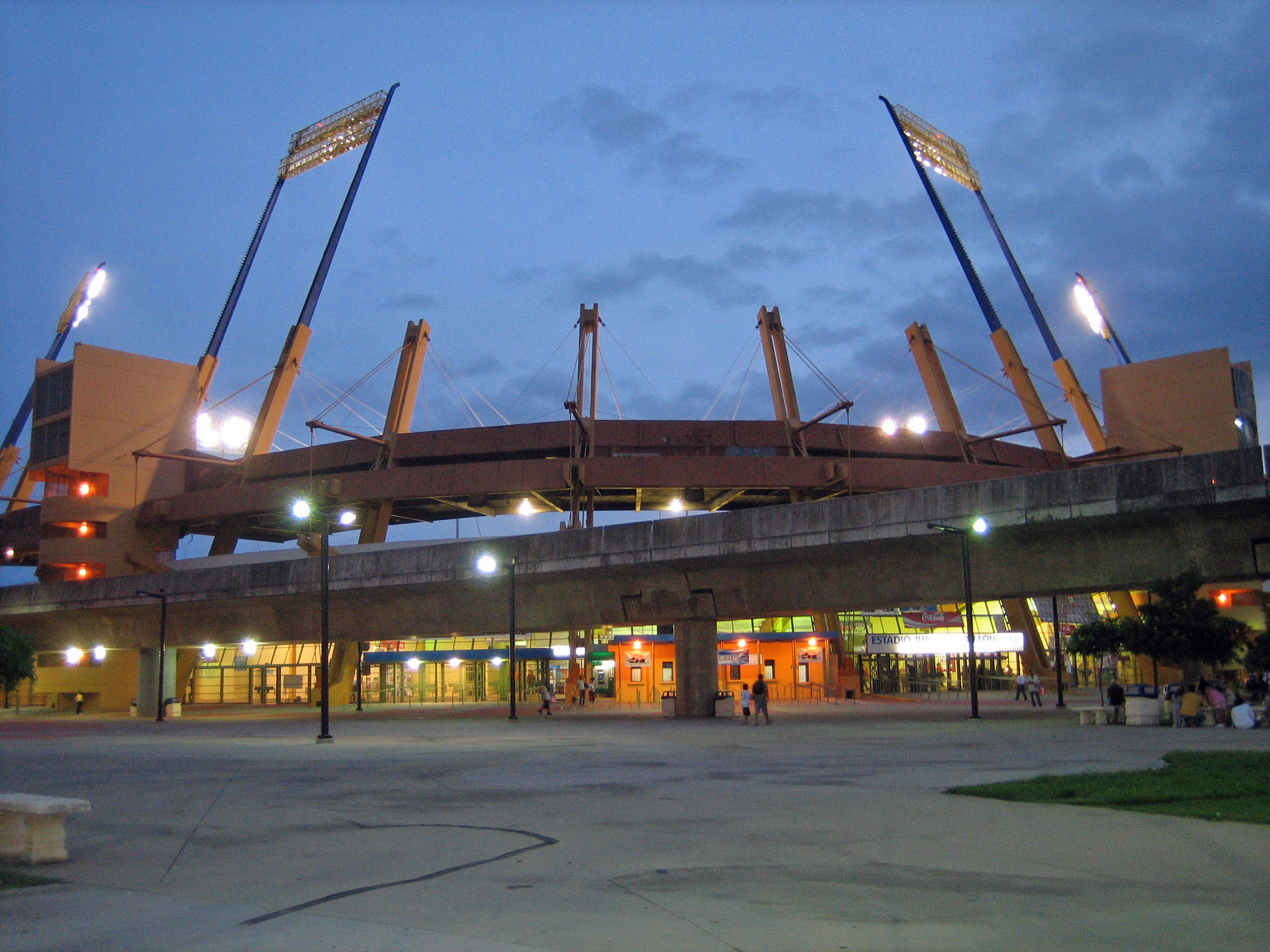
Juan Ramón Loubriel Stadium

Puerto Rico FC played their home matches at the renovated Juan Ramón Loubriel Stadium located in Bayamón. 10 miles from the capital city of San Juan, The "JRL", as it is now known, was originally a baseball stadium scheduled for demolition, and in 2003, it was converted into a football stadium for the Islanders. Until it was damaged by Hurricane Maria, the 22,000-seat stadium also served as the home to all levels of the Puerto Rico national football team as well as the Bayamon' affiliate team in the Puerto Rico Soccer League, Bayamón FC.

== Club culture ==
=== Supporters ===
Puerto Rico FC had two supporters' groups: La Barra Naranja and the US mainland–based group La Legión Extranjera. Puerto Rico FC supporters' groups were founded during the times of the Puerto Rico Islanders.

=== Rivalries ===
The club's main rivalry was the New York Cosmos, when the club announced a PR/NY Derby for the first game of the 2017 season. The Oranges currently have a record of zero wins, four losses, and one tie against their New York rivals.

== Broadcasting ==
On June 29, 2016, Puerto Rico FC signed an exclusive deal with local television channel WAPA TV. Puerto Rico FC home and away matches were televised on WAPA 2 Deportes.

== Players and staff ==
=== Current roster ===
Following the announcement by the NASL that there would be no 2018 season, the players were advised by Puerto Rico FC to look for playing opportunities beyond Puerto Rico.

=== Technical staff ===
Position	Staff
Head coach	Vacant
Assistant coach / Goalkeeping coach	Vacant
Director of community relations	Vacant
Athletic trainer	Vacant
Equipment Manager	Vacant

Last updated: May 18, 2017
Source: Puerto Rico FC

Executive staff

Position	Staff
Owner	(United States) Carmelo Anthony
President	Vacant
Technical director	Vacant

Last updated: May 18, 2017
Source: Puerto Rico FC

== Honors ==
=== Domestic ===
- Copa Luis Villarejo
  - Winners: 2016
- Bayamon City Cup
  - Winners: 2017

== Records ==
=== Year-by-year ===
Season	NASL									Overall	Playoffs	CFU Club Championship	Top goalscorer		Managers	Kit manufacturer	Shirt sponsor	Avg. attendance
Season	Div.	Pos.	Pl.	W	D	L	GS	GA	P	Overall	Playoffs	CFU Club Championship	Name	League	Managers	Kit manufacturer	Shirt sponsor	Avg. attendance
2016	Spring	did not enter								**12th**	did not qualify	N/A	(Puerto Rico) Héctor Ramos	8	(England) Adrian Whitbread	Nike	Claro	3,801
2016	Fall	**9th**	22	5	9	8	19	31	**24**	**12th**	did not qualify	N/A	(Puerto Rico) Héctor Ramos	8	(England) Adrian Whitbread	Nike	Claro	3,801
2017	Spring	**8th**	16	1	6	9	19	28	**9**	**8th**	did not qualify	1R	(United States) Conor Doyle (Guyana) Emery Welshman	5	(England) Adrian Whitbread (fired) (Puerto Rico) Marco Vélez	Nike	Claro	3,401
2017	Fall	**6th**	16	4	4	8	13	23	**13**	**8th**	did not qualify	1R	(United States) Conor Doyle (Guyana) Emery Welshman	5	(England) Adrian Whitbread (fired) (Puerto Rico) Marco Vélez	Nike	Claro	3,401

=== Top goalscorers ===
As of match played February 15, 2017

	Name	Years	NASL	Copa Luis Villarejo	CFU Club Championship	Total
1	(Puerto Rico) Héctor Ramos	2016–2017	18 (40)	4 (2)	**0** (0)	**12** (19)
2	(Puerto Rico) Sidney Rivera	2016–2017	3 (16)	1 (1)	**1** (1)	**4** (16)
3	(United States) Tyler Rudy	2016–2017	2 (21)	0 (3)	**0** (0)	**2** (21)
4	(Brazil) Paulo	2016	1 (21)	0 (2)	**0** (0)	**1** (21)
4	(Puerto Rico) Joseph Marrero	2016–2017	1 (16)	1 (2)	**0** (0)	**2** (16)
4	(United States) Kyle Culbertson	2016–2017	1 (15)	1 (2)	**0** (0)	**2** (15)
4	(Brazil) Oliver	2016	1 (9)	2 (2)	**0** (0)	**3** (9)
4	(Montenegro) Bljedi Bardic	2016	1 (3)	0 (0)	**0** (0)	**1** (3)
4	(Puerto Rico) Jorge Rivera	2016–2017	0 (0)	2 (1)	**0** (0)	**2** (0)
4	(United States) Brian Bement	2016–2017	0 (0)	2 (0)	**1** (1)	**2** (0)
4	(Brazil) Cristiano	2016–2017	0 (0)	1 (2)	**1** (1)	**1** (0)

=== Captains ===
- Only captains in competitive matches are included.
- Players marked in **bold** are still playing in the team.

Captain	Nationality	Years
Cristiano	Brazil	2016–2017
Yuma	Spain	2017

=== Managerial record ===
Information correct as of match played August 31, 2017. Only competitive matches are counted.

Name	Nat.	From	To	P	W	D	L	GS	GA	%W	Honours	Notes
Adrian Whitbread	England	August 14, 2015	May 18, 2017	29	5	12	12	28	44	17.24		
Marco Vélez Interim	Puerto Rico	May 18, 2017	August 2, 2017	9	1	3	5	10	13	11.11		
Marco Vélez	Puerto Rico	August 2, 2017		6	2	3	1	5	5	33.33		

- Notes:

P – Total of played matches W – Won matches D – Drawn matches L – Lost matches GS – Goal scored GA – Goals against
%W – Percentage of matches won

Nationality is indicated by the corresponding FIFA country code(s).
