= 2015 Indy Eleven season =

Indy Eleven
2015 season
- Owner: Ersal Ozdemir
- Head coach: Juergen Sommer (until June 2, 2015); Tim Regan (interim) (from June 2, 2015)
- Stadium: Michael Carroll Stadium
- NASL: Spring: 3rd Fall: Combined:
- Top goalscorer: League: Sergio Peña (2); Dylan Mares (2); Brian Brown (2); All: Dylan Mares (6)
- Highest home attendance: 10,524 (Sellout) (Apr. 11 vs. New York) (Apr. 26 vs. Carolina) (May 17 vs. Minnesota)
- Lowest home attendance: League: 9,629 (July 11 vs. Carolina); All: 6,450 (June 28 vs. Monarcas Morelia)
- Average home league attendance: League: 10,272; All: 9,402
Home colors	Away colors	Third colors

The 2015 Indy Eleven season was the club's second season of existence. The club played in North American Soccer League, the second tier of the American soccer pyramid.

== Roster ==
As of Match played October 30, 2015.

No.	Name	Nationality	Position	Date of birth (age)	Signed from	Signed in	Contract ends	Apps.	Goals
Goalkeepers
1	Keith Cardona	(United States)	GK	7 November 1992 (aged 22)	(Austria) Liefering	2015	10	0	0
24	Kristian Nicht	(Germany)	GK	3 April 1982 (aged 33)	Rochester Rhinos	2014		50	0
35	Jon Dawson	(United States)	GK			2014		0	0
Defenders
2	Judson McKinney	(United States)	DF	4 August 1988 (aged 27)		2015		2	1
3	Jaime Frías	(United States)	DF	18 February 1993 (aged 22)	Loan from (Mexico) Guadalajara	2014	2015	37	2
5	Erick Norales	(Honduras)	DF	11 February 1985 (aged 30)	(Honduras) Marathón	2014		49	5
12	Greg Janicki	(United States)	DF	9 July 1984 (aged 31)	San Antonio Scorpions	2015		21	0
16	Cory Miller	(United States)	DF	22 July 1988 (aged 27)	Los Angeles Blues	2014		29	0
18	Kyle Hyland	(United States)	DF	1 March 1991 (aged 24)	Columbus Crew	2014		37	1
21	Marco Franco	(United States)	DF	6 October 1991 (aged 24)	Chicago Fire	2015		34	0
Midfielders
4	Brad Ring	(United States)	MF	7 April 1987 (aged 28)	Portland Timbers	2014		33	2
6	Dylan Mares	(United States)	MF	11 February 1992 (aged 23)	Real Salt Lake	2014		48	6
8	Kléberson	(Brazil)	MF	19 June 1979 (aged 36)	(Brazil) Bahia	2014		21	8
10	Marvin Ceballos	(Guatemala)	MF	22 April 1992 (aged 23)	(Guatemala) Comunicaciones	2015		12	2
15	Daniel Keller	(United States)	MF	7 February 1992 (aged 23)	Chicago Fire U-23	2015		17	0
17	Dragan Stojkov	(North Macedonia)	MF	23 February 1988 (aged 27)	LA Galaxy II	2015		21	0
20	Sergio Peña	(Honduras)	MF	9 May 1987 (aged 28)	Loan from (Honduras) Real Sociedad	2015	2015	27	2
21	Dane Richards	(Jamaica)	MF	14 December 1983 (aged 31)	Loan from New York Red Bulls	2015	2015	15	3
22	Zach Steinberger	(United States)	MF	10 May 1992 (aged 23)	Loan from Zach Steinberger	2015	2015	12	2
27	Victor Pineda	(United States)	MF	15 March 1993 (aged 22)	Chicago Fire	2015		38	5
29	Daniel Cuevas	(United States)	MF	23 July 1993 (aged 22)	Loan from (Mexico) Santos Laguna	2015	2015	1	0
Forwards
7	Don Smart	(Jamaica)	FW	2 December 1987 (aged 27)	RVA	2014		54	6
9	Brian Brown	(Jamaica)	FW	24 December 1992 (aged 22)	Loan from (Jamaica) Harbour View	2015	2015	25	5
14	Duke Lacroix	(United States)	FW	14 October 1993 (aged 22)	Penn Quakers	2015		19	2
19	Wojciech Wojcik	(Poland)	FW	31 May 1992 (aged 23)	(Finland) Ilves	2015		22	2
99	Charlie Rugg	(United States)	FW	2 October 1990 (aged 25)	Loan from LA Galaxy	2015	2015	25	1
Left Indy Eleven
25	Osman Melgares	(Honduras)	MF	27 November 1986 (aged 28)	Loan from (Honduras) Real Sociedad	2015	2015	7	0

=== Staff ===
- (United States) Jeff Belskus – President
- (England) Tom Dunmore – Vice President of Marketing & Operations
- (United States) Tim Regan – Interim Head Coach & Director of Soccer Operations
- (Brazil) Kleberson – Assistant Coach
- (United States) Gary Yohe – Goalkeeper Coach

== Transfers ==
=== Winter ===
Note: Flags indicate national team as has been defined under FIFA eligibility rules. Players may hold more than one non-FIFA nationality.

In: Note: Flags indicate national team as defined under FIFA eligibility rules; some limited exceptions apply. Players may hold more than one non-FIFA nationality.

No.	Pos.	Nation	Player
1	GK	USA	Keith Cardona (from (Austria) FC Liefering)
2	DF	USA	Judson McKinney (loan extended from (United States) Milwaukee Wave)
3	DF	USA	Jaime Frías (loan extended from (Mexico) Guadalajara)
9	FW	JAM	Brian Brown (loan from (Jamaica) Harbour View)
12	DF	USA	Greg Janicki (from (United States) San Antonio Scorpions)
17	MF	MKD	Dragan Stojkov (from (United States) LA Galaxy II)
19	FW	POL	Wojciech Wojcik (from (Finland) Ilves-Kissat)
20	MF	HON	Sergio Peña (from (Honduras) Real Sociedad, previously on loan)
23	DF	USA	Marco Franco (from (United States) Chicago Fire, previously on loan)
24	GK	GER	Kristian Nicht (loan return from (Canada) Montreal Impact)
25	MF	HON	Osman Melgares (loan from (Honduras) Real Sociedad)
27	MF	USA	Victor Pineda (from (United States) Chicago Fire, previously on loan)
99	FW	USA	Charlie Rugg (loan from (United States) LA Galaxy)

Out: Note: Flags indicate national team as defined under FIFA eligibility rules; some limited exceptions apply. Players may hold more than one non-FIFA nationality.

No.	Pos.	Nation	Player
1	GK	USA	Nathan Sprenkel
2	DF	USA	Andrew Stone
6	DF	USA	Chris Estridge (to (United States) Charlotte Independence)
12	MF	USA	A. J. Corrado
13	MF	ENG	Corby Moore (to (England) Forest Green Rovers)
14	FW	JAM	Jermaine Johnson
15	FW	USA	Mike Ambersley (to (United States) Saint Louis)
17	FW	USA	Ben Spencer (loan return to (Norway) Molde)
19	MF	USA	Blake Smith (loan return to (Canada) Montreal Impact)
23	DF	USA	Fejiro Okiomah (to (United States) Pittsburgh Riverhounds)
24	GK	GER	Kristian Nicht (loan to (Canada) Montreal Impact)
88	FW	BRA	Jhulliam (to (Brazil) Resende)
99	FW	USA	Charlie Rugg (loan return to (United States) LA Galaxy)

=== Summer ===
Note: Flags indicate national team as has been defined under FIFA eligibility rules. Players may hold more than one non-FIFA nationality.

In: Note: Flags indicate national team as defined under FIFA eligibility rules; some limited exceptions apply. Players may hold more than one non-FIFA nationality.

No.	Pos.	Nation	Player
10	MF	GUA	Marvin Ceballos (from (Guatemala) Comunicaciones)
21	MF	JAM	Dane Richards (loan from (United States) New York Red Bulls)
22	MF	USA	Zach Steinberger (loan from (United States) Houston Dynamo)
29	MF	USA	Daniel Cuevas (from (Mexico) Santos Laguna)

Out: Note: Flags indicate national team as defined under FIFA eligibility rules; some limited exceptions apply. Players may hold more than one non-FIFA nationality.

No.	Pos.	Nation	Player
25	MF	HON	Osman Melgares (loan return to (Honduras) Real Sociedad)

== Friendlies ==
February 26, 2015 Scrimmage	Indy Eleven	0–1	Minnesota United FC	Casa Grande, Arizona
EDT		Report	Alhassan 32'	Stadium: Grande Sports World Field #7
Note: 70 minute scrimmage.

February 27, 2015 Scrimmage	Real Salt Lake Arizona U-18	0–2	Indy Eleven	Casa Grande, Arizona
EDT		Report	B. Wyatt (trialist) 55'; Wojcik 65'	Stadium: Grande Sports World

March 6, 2015 Match 1	Indiana Hoosiers	2–1	Indy Eleven	Bloomington, Indiana
EDT	Thompson 38'; Creviston 64'	Report	Mares 49'	Stadium: John Mellencamp Pavilion
Note: 9 vs. 9, three 30 minute periods.

March 11, 2015 Match 2	Saint Louis FC	0–2	Indy Eleven	Fenton, Missouri
EDT		Report	Lacroix 76'; Mares 83'	Stadium: St. Louis Soccer Park

March 15, 2015 Match 3	Indy Eleven	1–1	Dayton Flyers	Indianapolis
EDT	Mares 7'	Report	70' (pen.)	Stadium: Carroll Stadium

March 21, 2015 Match 4	Indy Eleven	1–2	Louisville City FC	Indianapolis
EDT	Peña (yellow card) 34'; Franco (yellow card) 43'; Janicki 57'; Wojcik (yellow card) 66'	Report	Guzman (yellow card) 21'; Adams (yellow card) 36'; West (yellow card) 42'; McCabe 53'; Fondy 64'	Stadium: Carroll Stadium

March 28, 2015 Match 5	Indy Eleven	5–0	Bradley Braves	Indianapolis
EDT	Wojcik 12'; Stojkov 60'; Mares 79'; Ring 86'; 90' (o.g.)	Report		Stadium: Carroll Stadium

June 28, 2015 International Friendly	Indy Eleven (United States)	0–0	(Mexico) Monarcas Morelia	Indianapolis, Indiana
13:30 EDT	Miller (yellow card) 82'		Huiqui (yellow card) 23'; Zamorano (yellow card) 76'; Pérez (yellow card) 87'	Stadium: Carroll Stadium; Attendance: 6,450

== Competitions ==
Win Tie Loss

=== NASL Spring season ===
==== Standings ====
Pos	Team	Pld	W	D	L	GF	GA	GD	Pts	Qualification
1	New York Cosmos (S)	10	5	5	0	18	9	+9	20	Playoffs
2	Tampa Bay Rowdies	10	5	4	1	15	9	+6	19	
3	Carolina RailHawks	10	3	5	2	15	10	+5	14	
4	Minnesota United	10	3	5	2	15	13	+2	14	
5	Indy Eleven	10	3	4	3	13	12	+1	13	
6	Jacksonville Armada	10	3	3	4	15	18	−3	12	
7	San Antonio Scorpions	10	3	3	4	11	15	−4	12	
8	Fort Lauderdale Strikers	10	3	2	5	12	13	−1	11	
9	Ottawa Fury	10	2	5	3	5	8	−3	11	
10	FC Edmonton	10	2	3	5	16	22	−6	9	
11	Atlanta Silverbacks	10	1	5	4	7	13	−6	8	

Source: NASL
Rules for classification: 1) points; 2) total goal differential; 3) total goals scored; 4) head-to-head record; 5) away goal differential; 6) away goals scored
(S) Spring season champion

==== Results summary ====
Overall								Home						Away					
Pld	W	D	L	GF	GA	GD	Pts	W	D	L	GF	GA	GD	W	D	L	GF	GA	GD
10	3	4	3	13	12	+1	13	1	3	1	8	7	+1	2	1	2	5	5	0

Last updated: 14 June 2015.
Source: Match reports

==== Results by round ====
Round	1	2	3	4	5	6	7	8	9	10
Stadium	A	H	A	H	A	H	A	H	A	H
Result	D	D	W	D	L	L	L	D	W	W
Position	6	6	3	5	7	8	11	11	7	5

Updated to match(es) played on 14 June 2015. Source: Match reports
A = Away; H = Home; W = Win; D = Draw; L = Loss

==== Matches ====
Win Loss Draw

April 4, 2015 Match 1	Atlanta Silverbacks	1–1	Indy Eleven	Atlanta
19:30 EDT	Bangura 47'	Summary	Franco (yellow card) 14'; Smart (yellow card) 82', (goal) 90' (pen.)	Stadium: Atlanta Silverbacks Park; Attendance: 4,711; Referee: Mark Geiger

April 11, 2015 Match 2	Indy Eleven	1–1	New York Cosmos	Indianapolis
20:30 EDT	Brown 12'; Stojkov (yellow card) 48'; Melgares (yellow card) 56'	Report	Raúl 65'	Stadium: Carroll Stadium; Attendance: 10,524 (Sellout); Referee: Sorin Stoica

April 19, 2015 Match 3	San Antonio Scorpions	1–2	Indy Eleven	San Antonio
21:30 EDT	Cummings 52'	Report	Mares (yellow card) 24'; Norales 63'; Ring (yellow card) 82'; Peña 89'	Stadium: Toyota Field; Attendance: 5,305; Referee: Mathieu Boudreau

April 26, 2015 Match 4	Indy Eleven	1–1	Carolina RailHawks	Indianapolis
EDT	Scott 7' (o.g.)	Report	Wagner 84'	Stadium: Carroll Stadium; Attendance: 10,524 (Sellout)

May 10, 2015 Match 5	Jacksonville Armada	1–0	Indy Eleven	Jacksonville
EDT	Ortiz (yellow card) 42'; Hoyos 49'; Toby (yellow card) 90'	Report	Peña (yellow card) 25'; Janicki (yellow card) 74'; Franco (yellow card) 82'	Stadium: Baseball Grounds of Jacksonville; Attendance: 8,318

May 17, 2015 Match 6	Indy Eleven	1–3	Minnesota United	Indianapolis
EDT	Peña 49'	Report	Alhassan 22'; Campos (yellow card) 35'; Davis 63'; Vicentini 63'	Stadium: Carroll Stadium; Attendance: 10,524 (Sellout)

May 23, 2015 Match 7	Ottawa Fury FC	1–0	Indy Eleven	Ottawa, Ontario
EDT	Beckie (yellow card) 22'; Poltronieri (yellow card) 37'; Paterson 88'; Ryan (yellow card) 90+'	Report	Mares (yellow card) 45'	Stadium: TD Place Stadium; Attendance: 5,245; Referee: Mathieu Bordeau

May 31, 2015 Match 8	Indy Eleven	2–2	Tampa Bay Rowdies	Indianapolis
EDT	Mares 21'; Brown (yellow card) 59'; Miller (yellow card) 74'; Hyland 90+'		Balchan 40'; Antonijevic (yellow card) 43' (red card) 89'; Santos 68'; Hernández (yellow card) 72'; Santos (red card) 74'; Menjivar (yellow card) 88'; Hristov (red card) 90+'	Stadium: Carroll Stadium; Attendance: 10,226; Referee: Baboucarr Jallow

June 6, 2015 Match 9	Fort Lauderdale Strikers	1–2	Indy Eleven	Fort Lauderdale
EDT	Stefano 23'; Sánchez (yellow card) 36'; Marcelin (yellow card) 46'; Moura (yellow card) 82'		Pineda 44', 90+', (yellow card) 90+'	Stadium: Lockhart Stadium; Attendance: 5,083; Referee: Daniel Fitzgerald

June 13, 2015 Match 10	Indy Eleven	3–0	FC Edmonton	Indianapolis
19:30 EDT	Brown 39'; Mares 44' (pen.); Lacroix 82'; Miller (yellow card) 83'		Raudales (red card) 67'; Jonke (yellow card) 90'	Stadium: Carroll Stadium; Attendance: 10,202; Referee: Christopher Penso

=== NASL Fall season ===
==== Standings ====
Pos	Team	Pld	W	D	L	GF	GA	GD	Pts	Qualification
1	Ottawa Fury (F)	20	13	6	1	37	15	+22	45	Playoffs
2	Minnesota United	20	11	6	3	39	26	+13	39	
3	New York Cosmos	20	10	6	4	31	21	+10	36	
4	Fort Lauderdale Strikers	20	8	6	6	37	27	+10	30	
5	FC Edmonton	20	7	5	8	25	24	+1	26	
6	Atlanta Silverbacks	20	6	7	7	24	27	−3	25	
7	Carolina RailHawks	20	6	3	11	29	39	−10	21	
8	Tampa Bay Rowdies	20	5	5	10	18	28	−10	20	
9	Indy Eleven	20	5	5	10	23	36	−13	20	
10	San Antonio Scorpions	20	4	7	9	30	37	−7	19	
11	Jacksonville Armada	20	5	4	11	18	31	−13	19	

Source: NASL
Rules for classification: 1) points; 2) total goal differential; 3) total goals scored; 4) head-to-head record; 5) away goal differential; 6) away goals scored
(F) Fall season champion

==== Results summary ====
Overall								Home						Away					
Pld	W	D	L	GF	GA	GD	Pts	W	D	L	GF	GA	GD	W	D	L	GF	GA	GD
20	5	5	10	21	36	−15	20	5	1	4	13	13	0	0	4	6	8	23	−15

Last updated: 30 October 2015.
Source: Match reports

==== Results by round ====
Round	1	2	3	4	5	6	7	8	9	10	11	12	13	14	15	16	17	18	19	20
Stadium	A	H	A	H	H	A	H	H	A	A	A	H	A	H	A	A	H	H	H	A
Result	D	W	L	D	L	L	L	W	D	L	L	W	L	L	D	D	L	W	W	L
Position	5	4	6	7	8	8	10	9	8	9	9	7	9	10	10	10	11	11	8	9

Updated to match(es) played on 30 October 2015. Source: Match reports
A = Away; H = Home; W = Win; D = Draw; L = Loss

==== Matches ====
July 5, 2015 Match 1	New York Cosmos	1–1	Indy Eleven	Hempstead
19:00 EDT	Guenzatti (yellow card) 67'; Szetela (yellow card) 72'; Restrepo 78'	Report	Wojcik 26'; Stojkov (yellow card) 77'; Ring (yellow card) 85'; Miller (yellow card) 90'	Stadium: Shuart Stadium; Attendance: 3,647; Referee: Mathieu Bordeau

July 11, 2015 Match 2	Indy Eleven	2–1	Carolina RailHawks	Indianapolis
19:30 EDT	Wojcik 54', (yellow card) 55'; Norales 56'; Lacroix (yellow card) 67'; Keller (yellow card) 85'	Report	Thompson (yellow card) 40' da Luz 42'	Stadium: Carroll Stadium; Attendance: 9,629; Referee: Tyler Ploeger

July 19, 2015 Match 3	Ottawa Fury FC	4–2	Indy Eleven	Ottawa
15:00 EDT	Alves 13'; Ryan 35', 65'; Heinemann 56'; Eustaquio (yellow card) 74'	Report	Smart (yellow card) 15' (goal) 33'; Hyland (yellow card) 16'; Miller (yellow card) 34' (yellow-red card) 89'; McKinney 90'	Stadium: TD Place Stadium; Attendance: 4,372; Referee: Yusri Rudolf

July 25, 2015 Match 4	Indy Eleven	1–1	New York Cosmos	Indianapolis
19:30 EDT	Stojkov (yellow card) 34'; Mares 45+2'; Norales (red card) 66'	Report	Ayoze (yellow card) 36'; Diosa (yellow card) 45'; Restrepo 45+1'; Mendes (yellow card) 52'; Guenzatti (red card) 65'; Szetela (yellow card) 90'	Stadium: Carroll Stadium; Attendance: 10,206; Referee: Jaime Herrera Garduno

August 1, 2015 Match 5	Indy Eleven	0–1	Atlanta Silverbacks	Indianapolis
19:30 EDT		Report	Pedro Ferreira-Mendes 15' (yellow card) 74'; Porter (yellow card) 28'; Paulo Ferreira-Mendes (yellow card) 88'	Stadium: Carroll Stadium; Attendance: 9,632; Referee: Fotis Bazakos

August 5, 2015 Match 6	FC Edmonton	2–0	Indy Eleven	Edmonton
21:00 EDT	Watson 16'; Ameobi 70'; Laing (yellow card) 80'; Smith (yellow card) 83'	Report		Stadium: Clarke Stadium; Attendance: 3,120; Referee: David Barrie

August 8, 2015 Match 7	Indy Eleven	1–4	Ottawa Fury FC	Indianapolis
19:30 EDT	Brown (yellow card) 22'; Lacroix 60'; Ceballos (yellow card) 73'	Report	Ubiparipović 9'; Trafford (yellow card) 17'; Alves (yellow card) 22'; Ryan (yellow card) 38'; Wiedeman 54', 64'; Eustaquio 62'; Richter (yellow card) 82'	Stadium: Carroll Stadium; Attendance: 9,866; Referee: Tyler Ploeger

August 19, 2015 Match 8	Indy Eleven	2–0	Tampa Bay Rowdies	Indianapolis
19:30 EDT	Steinberger (yellow card) 42'; Richards 60'; Norales 70'	Report	Chavez (yellow card) 31'; Mkandawire (yellow card) 69'	Stadium: Carroll Stadium; Attendance: 8,500; Referee: Robert Sibiga

August 22, 2015 Match 9	Atlanta Silverbacks	1–1	Indy Eleven	Atlanta
19:30 EDT	Mensing (yellow card) 70' (yellow-red card) 77'; Janicki 76' (o.g.); Burgos (yellow card) 82'	Report	Richards 6'; Franco (yellow card) 45'; Norales (red card) 50'; Smart (yellow card) 90'	Stadium: Atlanta Silverbacks Park; Attendance: 4,021; Referee: Daniel Fitzgerald

August 29, 2015 Match 10	Fort Lauderdale Strikers	7–1	Indy Eleven	Fort Lauderdale
19:30 EDT	Pinho 2', 77', 81'; Victor 7', 85'; Thomas (yellow card) 10'; Freitas 20', 67'	Report	Richards 16'; Pineda (yellow card) 18'; Franco (red card) 50'	Stadium: Lockhart Stadium; Attendance: 3,819; Referee: Daniel Radford

September 2, 2015 Match 11	Minnesota United FC	1–0	Indy Eleven	Blaine
20:00 EDT	Moura (yellow card) 24'; Pitchkolan (yellow card) 68'; Davis 77'	Report	Richards (yellow card) 17'	Stadium: National Sports Center; Attendance: 7,137; Referee: Fotis Bazakos

September 5, 2015 Match 12	Indy Eleven	3–0	Jacksonville Armada FC	Indianapolis
19:30 EDT	Steinberger 9', 73'; Keller (yellow card) 38'; Ceballos 90' (yellow card) 90'	Report	Barrett (yellow card) 81'	Stadium: Carroll Stadium

September 12, 2015 Match 13	San Antonio Scorpions	2–0	Indy Eleven	San Antonio
20:30 EDT	Castillo 45' (pen.), 72'; Cummings (yellow card) 57'; Attakora (yellow card) 78'; Elizondo (red card) 90'	Report	Richards (yellow card) 17'	Stadium: Toyota Field; Attendance: 6,500; Referee: Jaime Herrera Garduno

September 19, 2015 Match 14	Indy Eleven	0–2	FC Edmonton	Indianapolis
19:30 EDT	Ring (yellow card) 72'	Report	Roberts (yellow card) 45'; Corea (yellow card) 47'; Fordyce 55'; Nyassi 85'	Stadium: Carroll Stadium; Attendance: 9,840; Referee: Alejandro Mariscal

September 30, 2015 Match 15	Tampa Bay Rowdies	1–1	Indy Eleven	St. Petersburg
19:30 EDT	Guerra (yellow card) 14'; Menjivar (yellow card) 41'; Tan 63'; Mkandawire (yellow card) 88'	Report	Frías 67'	Stadium: Al Lang Stadium; Attendance: 4,691; Referee: Baboucarr Jallow

October 3, 2015 Match 16	Jacksonville Armada FC	1–1	Indy Eleven	Jacksonville
19:30 EDT	Castrillón 29'; Scaglia (yellow card) 33'; Jérôme (red card) 63'; Hrustic (yellow card) 79'; Johnson (yellow card) 88'	Report	Brown 83'	Stadium: Community First Park; Attendance: 6,734; Referee: Juan Guzmán

October 10, 2015 Match 17	Indy Eleven	1–2	San Antonio Scorpions	Indianapolis
19:30 EDT	Peña (yellow card) 56'; Mares 69'; Miller (yellow card) 72'	Report	Gentile 19'; Cann (yellow card) 25'; Tyrpak 79'; Fernandes (yellow card) 90'	Stadium: Carroll Stadium; Attendance: 10,090; Referee: Hilario Grajeda

October 17, 2015 Match 18	Indy Eleven	3–1	Minnesota United FC	Indianapolis
19:30 EDT	Mares 39'; Brown 55'; Ring 82' (yellow card) 89'	Report	Venegas (yellow card) 81'; Bre.Kallman 85' (yellow card) 90'; Pitchkolan (yellow card) 90'	Stadium: Carroll Stadium; Attendance: 9,085; Referee: Jose Rivero

October 24, 2015 Match 19	Indy Eleven	2–1	Fort Lauderdale Strikers	Indianapolis
19:30 EDT	Smart 20' (yellow card) 29'; Steinberger (yellow card) 34'; Brown 43'; Nicht (yellow card) 90'	Report	Angulo 59'; Thomas (yellow card) 90+4'	Stadium: Carroll Stadium; Attendance: 9,213; Referee: Mathieu Boudreau

October 30, 2015 Match 20	Carolina RailHawks	3–1	Indy Eleven	Cary
19:30 EDT	Novo 9'; Shipalane 16'; Osaki (yellow card) 64'; Pérez 86'	Report	Ceballos 24'; Peña (yellow card) 33'; Mares (yellow card) 90'	Stadium: WakeMed Soccer Park; Attendance: 6,272; Referee: Matthew Kreitzer

=== U.S. Open Cup ===
The Eleven will compete in the 2015 edition of the Open Cup.

May 27, 2015 Third Round	Indy Eleven	0–2 (a.e.t.)	Louisville City	Indianapolis, Indiana
20:00 EDT	Janicki (yellow card) 57'; Wojcik (yellow card) 83'	Report	King (yellow card) 17'; Polak 115'; Rivera 120' (yellow card) 12'	Stadium: Carroll Stadium; Attendance: 7,134

== Squad statistics ==
As of Match played 30 October 2015

=== Appearances and goals ===
No.	Pos	Nat	Player	Total		NASL Spring Season		NASL Fall Season		U.S. Open Cup	
No.	Pos	Nat	Player	Apps	Goals	Apps	Goals	Apps	Goals	Apps	Goals
1	GK	(United States) USA	Keith Cardona	10	0	2	0	8	0	0	0
2	DF	(United States) USA	Judson McKinney	2	1	0	0	1+1	1	0	0
3	DF	(United States) USA	Jaime Frías	12	1	5	0	7	1	0	0
4	MF	(United States) USA	Brad Ring	21	1	7+2	0	9+3	1	0	0
5	DF	(Honduras) HON	Erick Norales	26	3	9	1	16	2	1	0
6	MF	(United States) USA	Dylan Mares	22	5	9+1	2	8+3	3	0+1	0
7	FW	(Jamaica) JAM	Don Smart	26	3	1+8	1	10+6	2	1	0
8	MF	(Brazil) BRA	José Kléberson	1	0	0	0	0+1	0	0	0
9	FW	(Jamaica) JAM	Brian Brown	25	5	7+3	2	8+6	3	1	0
10	MF	(Guatemala) GUA	Marvin Ceballos	12	2	0	0	6+6	2	0	0
12	DF	(United States) USA	Greg Janicki	21	0	7	0	9+4	0	1	0
14	FW	(United States) USA	Duke Lacroix	19	2	0+2	1	7+9	1	0+1	0
15	DF	(United States) USA	Daniel Keller	17	0	1+1	0	10+4	0	1	0
16	DF	(United States) USA	Cory Miller	20	0	4	0	15+1	0	0	0
17	MF	(North Macedonia) MKD	Dragan Stojkov	21	0	6+1	0	12+2	0	0	0
18	DF	(United States) USA	Kyle Hyland	19	1	5+1	1	12	0	1	0
19	FW	(Poland) POL	Wojciech Wojcik	22	2	5+4	0	8+4	2	1	0
20	MF	(Honduras) HON	Sergio Peña	12	2	5+2	2	5	0	0	0
21	MF	(Jamaica) JAM	Dane Richards	15	3	0	0	12+3	3	0	0
22	MF	(United States) USA	Zach Steinberger	12	2	0	0	11+1	2	0	0
23	DF	(United States) USA	Marco Franco	28	0	10	0	17	0	1	0
24	GK	(Germany) GER	Kristian Nicht	21	0	8	0	12	0	1	0
27	MF	(United States) USA	Victor Pineda	21	2	6+1	2	11+2	0	1	0
29	MF	(United States) USA	Daniel Cuevas	1	0	0	0	1	0	0	0
99	FW	(United States) USA	Charlie Rugg	20	0	9+1	0	4+5	0	0+1	0
Players who left Indy Eleven during the season:
25	MF	(Honduras) HON	Osman Melgares	7	0	4+2	0	0	0	1	0

=== Goal scorers ===
Place	Position	Nation	Number	Name	NASL Spring Season	NASL Fall Season	U.S. Open Cup	Total
1	MF	(United States)	6	Dylan Mares	2	3	0	5
1	FW	(Jamaica)	9	Brian Brown	3	2	0	5
3	DF	(Honduras)	5	Erick Norales	1	2	0	3
3	FW	(Jamaica)	7	Don Smart	1	2	0	3
3	FW	(Jamaica)	21	Dane Richards	0	3	0	3
6	MF	(Honduras)	20	Sergio Peña	2	0	0	2
6	MF	(United States)	27	Victor Pineda	2	0	0	2
6	FW	(Poland)	19	Wojciech Wojcik	0	2	0	2
6	MF	(United States)	22	Zach Steinberger	0	2	0	2
6	MF	(Guatemala)	10	Marvin Ceballos	0	2	0	2
6	FW	(United States)	14	Duke Lacroix	1	1	0	2
11	DF	(United States)	18	Kyle Hyland	1	0	0	1
11	DF	(United States)	3	Jaime Frías	0	1	0	1
11	DF	(United States)	2	Judson McKinney	0	1	0	1
11	MF	(United States)	4	Brad Ring	0	1	0	1
11				Own goal	1	0	0	1
TOTALS					13	23	0	36

=== Disciplinary record ===
Number	Nation	Position	Name	NASL Spring Season		NASL Fall Season		U.S. Open Cup		Total	
Number	Nation	Position	Name	Yellow card	Red card	Yellow card	Red card	Yellow card	Red card	Yellow card	Red card
4	(United States)	MF	Brad Ring	1	0	3	0	0	0	4	0
5	(Honduras)	DF	Erick Norales	0	0	0	2	0	0	0	2
6	(United States)	MF	Dylan Mares	2	0	1	0	0	0	3	0
7	(Jamaica)	FW	Don Smart	1	0	3	0	0	0	4	0
9	(Jamaica)	FW	Brian Brown	1	0	1	0	0	0	2	0
10	(Guatemala)	MF	Marvin Ceballos	0	0	2	0	0	0	2	0
12	(United States)	DF	Greg Janicki	1	0	0	0	1	0	2	0
14	(United States)	FW	Duke Lacroix	0	0	1	0	0	0	1	0
15	(United States)	DF	Daniel Keller	0	0	2	0	0	0	2	0
16	(United States)	DF	Cory Miller	2	0	4	1	0	0	6	1
17	(North Macedonia)	MF	Dragan Stojkov	1	0	2	0	0	0	3	0
18	(United States)	DF	Kyle Hyland	0	0	1	0	0	0	1	0
19	(Poland)	FW	Wojciech Wojcik	0	0	1	0	1	0	2	0
20	(Honduras)	MF	Sergio Peña	1	0	2	0	0	0	3	0
21	(Jamaica)	MF	Dane Richards	0	0	2	0	0	0	2	0
22	(United States)	MF	Zach Steinberger	0	0	2	0	0	0	2	0
23	(United States)	DF	Marco Franco	2	0	1	1	0	0	3	1
24	(Germany)	GK	Kristian Nicht	0	0	1	0	0	0	1	0
27	(United States)	MF	Victor Pineda	1	0	1	0	0	0	2	0
Players who left Indy Eleven during the season:
25	(Honduras)	MF	Osman Melgares	1	0	0	0	0	0	1	0
			TOTALS	14	0	30	4	2	0	46	4
