= 2014 Indy Eleven season =

Indy Eleven
2014 season
- Owner: Ersal Ozdemir
- Head Coach: Juergen Sommer
- NASL: Spring: 10th Fall: 7th Combined: 9th
- U.S. Open Cup: Fourth Round vs Columbus Crew
- Top goalscorer: League: Kléberson (8); All: Kléberson (8)
- Highest home attendance: 11,048 (April 12 v. Carolina)
- Lowest home attendance: League: 10,285 (3 times); All: 9,181 (May 28 v. Dayton)
- Average home league attendance: League: 10,478; All: 10,293
Home colors	Away colors	Third colors

The 2014 Indy Eleven season was the club's inaugural season of existence. The club played in North American Soccer League, the second tier of the American soccer pyramid.

== Background ==
On January 16, 2013, NASL announced that an Indianapolis expansion team owned by Ersal Ozdemir, CEO of Keystone Group LLC, would join the league in 2014. Ozdemir named Peter Wilt as the team's first President and General Manager, this after the veteran American soccer executive had served in a consulting role to explore the viability of professional soccer in Indianapolis in the three months leading up to the January 2013 announcement.

Indy Pro Soccer's vision is to create a team that is representative of Indiana and creates strong emotional connections with its fans. Those connections will be made with Indiana's youth and adult soccer community and the active young adult urban and ethnic populations. The makeup of the team will reflect the community, so that it can live up to its slogan of "The World's Game, Indiana's Team". The club has secured over 6,000 season ticket deposits for its inaugural 2014 campaign as of October 2013.

The name and club colors were officially revealed to the public on April 25, 2013, during a ceremony held at Indianapolis' iconic Soldiers and Sailors Monument. Indy Eleven named former Indiana University standout, U.S. international and English Premier League and Major League Soccer veteran Juergen Sommer as its first Head Coach/Director of Soccer Operations on June 11, 2013.

On October 1, 2013, the team announced German goalkeeper, Kristian Nicht, as their first signing.

== Roster ==
As of Match played November 1, 2014.

No.	Name	Nationality	Position	Date of birth (age)	Signed from	Signed in	Contract ends	Apps.	Goals
Goalkeepers
1	Nathan Sprenkel	(United States)	GK	18 April 1990 (aged 24)		2014		0	0
24	Kristian Nicht	(Germany)	GK	3 April 1982 (aged 32)	Rochester Rhinos	2014		29	0
35	Jon Dawson	(United States)	GK			2014		0	0
Defenders
2	Andrew Stone	(United States)	DF	18 November 1990 (aged 23)	Milwaukee Panthers	2014		7	0
3	Jaime Frías	(United States)	DF	18 February 1993 (aged 21)	Loan from (Mexico) Guadalajara	2014	2014	25	1
5	Erick Norales	(Honduras)	DF	11 February 1985 (aged 29)	(Honduras) Marathón	2014		23	2
6	Chris Estridge	(United States)	DF	21 September 1989 (aged 25)	Rochester Rhinos	2014		11	1
16	Cory Miller	(United States)	DF	22 July 1988 (aged 26)	Los Angeles Blues	2014		9	0
18	Kyle Hyland	(United States)	DF	1 March 1991 (aged 23)	Columbus Crew	2014		18	0
21	Marco Franco	(United States)	DF	6 October 1991 (aged 23)	Loan from Chicago Fire	2014	2014	6	0
23	Fejiro Okiomah	(United States)	DF	10 November 1990 (aged 23)	Charlotte Eagles	2014		16	0
Midfielders
4	Brad Ring	(United States)	MF	7 April 1987 (aged 27)	Portland Timbers	2014		13	1
8	Kléberson	(Brazil)	MF	19 June 1979 (aged 35)	(Brazil) Bahia	2014		20	8
12	A. J. Corrado	(United States)	MF	8 January 1992 (aged 22)	San Jose Earthquakes	2014		16	0
13	Corby Moore	(England)	MF	21 November 1993 (aged 20)	(England) Southampton	2014		14	0
19	Blake Smith	(United States)	MF	17 January 1991 (aged 23)	Loan from Montreal Impact	2014	2014	21	6
20	Sergio Peña	(Honduras)	MF	9 May 1987 (aged 27)	Loan from (Honduras) Real Sociedad	2014	2014	15	0
22	Dylan Mares	(United States)	MF	11 February 1992 (aged 22)	Real Salt Lake	2014		26	1
27	Victor Pineda	(United States)	MF	15 March 1993 (aged 21)	Loan from Chicago Fire	2014	2014	17	3
Forwards
7	Don Smart	(Jamaica)	FW	2 December 1987 (aged 26)	RVA	2014		28	3
14	Jermaine Johnson	(Jamaica)	FW	25 June 1980 (aged 34)	(England) Sheffield Wednesday	2014		10	2
15	Mike Ambersley	(United States)	FW	14 February 1983 (aged 31)	Minnesota United	2014		28	7
17	Ben Spencer	(United States)	FW	28 March 1995 (aged 19)	Loan from (Norway) Molde	2014	2014	13	2
88	Jhulliam	(Brazil)	FW	4 April 1988 (aged 26)	(Moldova) Sheriff Tiraspol	2014		8	3
99	Charlie Rugg	(United States)	FW	2 October 1990 (aged 24)	Loan from LA Galaxy	2014	2014	5	1
Left Indy Eleven
9	Pedro Ferreira-Mendes	(Brazil)	FW	13 May 1990 (aged 24)	Atlanta Silverbacks	2014		14	0
21	Walter Ramírez	(Honduras)	MF	7 November 1983 (aged 30)	San Antonio Scorpions	2014		8	0
26	Baba Omosegbon	(United States)	DF			2014		1	0

== Friendlies ==
February 5, 2014 Preseason	Indy Eleven	2–3	Vancouver Whitecaps FC	Casa Grande, Arizona
3:00 p.m. MT	Mendes 29'; Smart 71'	Report	Fisk 26'; Hurtado (yellow card) 70'; Salgado 77', 81'	Stadium: Grande Sports World; Referee: Ricardo Salazar

February 7, 2014 Preseason	Indy Eleven	1–3	Sporting Kansas City	Tucson, Arizona
4:00 p.m. MT	Trialist "Elkhart" 1'; Trialist "Cass" (yellow card) 56'	Report	Bieler 9'; Sapong 11'; Zizzo 46'; Schmetz (yellow card) 75'	Stadium: Kino Sports Complex

February 12, 2014 Preseason	Indy Eleven	0–1	Portland Timbers	Tucson, Arizona
6:00 p.m. MT		Report	Zemanski 75'	Stadium: Kino Sports Complex

February 26, 2014 Preseason	Indy Eleven	2–4	Sporting Kansas City	Lake Buena Vista, Florida
11:00 a.m. EST	Mendes (yellow card) 15', (goal) 24' 38'	Report	Bieler 22' (pen.) 49' 68' (pen.); Lopez 72'	Stadium: ESPN Wide World of Sports Complex

March 15, 2014 Preseason	Indy Eleven	2–0	Tourbeau Soccer Academy (NAIA All-Stars)	Westfield, Indiana
7:00 p.m. EST	Mendes 11', 88'; Ramírez (yellow card) 90+'	Report	Viera (yellow card) 31'; Jiminez (red card); Cruz (yellow card) 52'	Stadium: Westfield High School

March 22, 2014 Preseason	Louisville Cardinals	2–2	Indy Eleven	Louisville, Kentucky
7:00 p.m. EST	Moore 54'; DeGraffenreidt (yellow card) 71'; Vitalis 78'	Report	Ramírez (yellow card) 64'; Ring (yellow card) 71'; Smart 72'; Omosegbon (yellow card) 74'; Frías Jr. (yellow card) 84'; Spencer 89'	Stadium: Cardinal Park

April 1, 2014 Preseason	Indy Eleven	1–3	Chicago Fire SC	West Lafayette, Indiana
7:30 p.m. EST				Stadium: Boilermaker Soccer Complex

April 4, 2014 Preseason	Indy Eleven	3–1	Indiana Hoosiers	Indianapolis, Indiana
7:30 p.m. EST		Report		Stadium: Carroll Stadium

== Competitions ==
=== NASL Spring season ===
==== Standings ====
Pos	Team	Pld	W	D	L	GF	GA	GD	Pts	Qualification
1	Minnesota United (S)	9	6	2	1	16	9	+7	20	Playoffs
2	New York Cosmos	9	6	1	2	14	3	+11	19	
3	San Antonio Scorpions	9	5	2	2	13	9	+4	17	
4	Carolina RailHawks	9	4	2	3	11	15	−4	14	
5	Fort Lauderdale Strikers	9	4	1	4	18	18	0	13	
6	Ottawa Fury	9	3	1	5	14	13	+1	10	
7	Tampa Bay Rowdies	9	2	4	3	11	16	−5	10	
8	Atlanta Silverbacks	9	3	1	5	12	20	−8	10	
9	FC Edmonton	9	2	2	5	11	11	0	8	
10	Indy Eleven	9	0	4	5	14	20	−6	4	

Source: NASL Standings
(S) Spring season champion

==== Results summary ====
Overall								Home						Away					
Pld	W	D	L	GF	GA	GD	Pts	W	D	L	GF	GA	GD	W	D	L	GF	GA	GD
9	0	4	5	14	20	−6	4	0	2	3	6	10	−4	0	2	2	8	10	−2

Last updated: June 23, 2014.
Source: Match reports

==== Results by round ====
Round	1	2	3	4	5	6	7	8	9
Ground	H	H	A	A	H	H	A	H	A
Result	D	D	L	L	L	L	D	L	D
Position	4	6	8	9	10	10	10	10	10

Updated to match(es) played on June 23, 2014. Source: Match reports
A = Away; H = Home; W = Win; D = Draw; L = Loss

==== Match reports ====
April 12, 2014 Match 1	Indy Eleven	1–1	Carolina Railhawks	Indianapolis, Indiana
7:30 p.m. EDT	Ambersley 43'	Report	Scott (yellow card) 6'; Schilawski 50'; Burt (yellow card) 61'	Stadium: Carroll Stadium; Attendance: 11,048; Referee: Chris Penso

April 19, 2014 Match 2	Indy Eleven	1–1	Tampa Bay Rowdies	Indianapolis, Indiana
7:30 p.m. EDT	Norales 81'	Report	Shriver 48'; Hristov (yellow card) 61'; Wagner (yellow card) 61'; Mkosana (yellow card) 61'	Stadium: Michael A. Carroll Stadium; Attendance: 10,412; Referee: Robert Sibiga

April 26, 2014 Match 3	Fort Lauderdale Strikers	3–2	Indy Eleven	Fort Lauderdale, Florida
7:30 p.m. EDT	Núñez 7'; Pecka (yellow card) 64'; Picault 69'; Ebbers 73'	Report	Ferreira-Mendes (yellow card) 21'; Kléberson 26' (pen.) (yellow card) 42'; Hyland (yellow card) 78'; Norales 90+4' (yellow card) 90'	Stadium: Lockhart Stadium; Attendance: 3,515; Referee: Daniel Fitzgerald

May 3, 2014 Match 4	Minnesota United FC	3–2	Indy Eleven	Blaine, Minnesota, USA
19:00 CDT	Ramirez 23'; Mendes 25', (yellow card) 37'; Dias (yellow card) 44'; Pitchkolan 45'	Report	Ring (yellow card) 31'; Bracalello 42' (o.g.); Frías (yellow card) 48'; Ferreira-Mendes (yellow card) 85'; Kléberson 90' (pen.)	Stadium: National Sports Center; Attendance: 4,913; Referee: Daniel Radford

May 10, 2014 Match 5	Indy Eleven	1–2	FC Edmonton	Indianapolis, Indiana
7:30 p.m. EDT	Ring (yellow card) 12'; Ambersley 29' (yellow card) 61'; Hyland (yellow card) 81'; Norales (yellow card) 84'	Summary	Banner (yellow card) 10'; Fordyce 24'; Moses 26'; Hlavaty (yellow card) 57'; Laing (yellow card) 57'; Edward (yellow card) 84'	Stadium: Carroll Stadium; Attendance: 10,285; Referee: Sorin Stoica

May 17, 2014 Match 6	Indy Eleven	2–4	Ottawa Fury FC	Indianapolis, Indiana
7:30 p.m. EDT	Ambersley 20' (pen.); Norales (yellow card) 25'; Spencer 44' (yellow card) 45'; Ring (yellow card) 90'	Summary	Donatelli 16', 42'; Jarun 40'; Minatel 68'	Stadium: Carroll Stadium; Attendance: 10,285; Referee: Mark Kadlecik

May 24, 2014 Match 7	New York Cosmos	1–1	Indy Eleven	Hempstead, New York
7:30 p.m. EDT	Guenzatti 4'; Paulo (yellow card) 61'	Report	Norales (yellow card) 50'; Moore (yellow card) 70'; Ring 76'	Stadium: James M. Shuart Stadium; Attendance: 3,581; Referee: Jose Rivero

May 31, 2014 Match 8	Indy Eleven	1–2	San Antonio Scorpions	Indianapolis, Indiana
7:30 p.m. EDT	Corrado (yellow card) 7'; Ring (yellow card) 43'; Smith 74'; Norales (yellow card) 80'	Summary	Forbes 52' (yellow card) 23'; Menjivar (yellow card) 63'; Restrepo 90+4'	Stadium: Carroll Stadium; Attendance: 10,285; Referee: Chris Penso

June 7, 2014 Match 9	Atlanta Silverbacks	3–3	Indy Eleven	Atlanta
7:30 p.m. EDT	Chavez 12' (pen.), 45+2' (pen.); Cruz 15', (yellow card) 57'; Garcia (yellow card) 45'; Roushandel (yellow card) 88'; Reiss (yellow card) 90'	Report	Ambersley 13', 58' (pen.); Smith (yellow card) 45+1'; Estridge (yellow card) 62'; Okiomah (red card) 65'; Kleberson 88' (pen.)	Stadium: Atlanta Silverbacks Park; Attendance: 5,000; Referee: Alan Kelly

=== NASL Fall season ===
==== Standings ====
Pos	Team	Pld	W	D	L	GF	GA	GD	Pts	Qualification
1	San Antonio Scorpions (F)	18	11	2	5	30	15	+15	35	Playoffs
2	Minnesota United	18	10	5	3	31	19	+12	35	
3	FC Edmonton	18	8	5	5	23	18	+5	29	
4	Fort Lauderdale Strikers	18	7	6	5	20	21	−1	27	
5	Carolina RailHawks	18	7	3	8	27	28	−1	24	
6	New York Cosmos	18	5	8	5	23	24	−1	23	
7	Indy Eleven	18	6	5	7	21	26	−5	23	
8	Tampa Bay Rowdies	18	5	5	8	25	34	−9	20	
9	Ottawa Fury	18	4	5	9	20	25	−5	17	
10	Atlanta Silverbacks	18	3	4	11	20	30	−10	13	

Source: NASL Standings
(F) Fall season champion

==== Results summary ====
Overall								Home						Away					
Pld	W	D	L	GF	GA	GD	Pts	W	D	L	GF	GA	GD	W	D	L	GF	GA	GD
18	6	5	7	21	26	−5	23	2	3	4	10	12	−2	4	2	3	11	14	−3

Last updated: November 3, 2014.
Source: Match reports

==== Results by round ====
Round	1	2	3	4	5	6	7	8	9	10	11	12	13	14	15	16	17	18
Ground	A	H	A	H	H	A	A	H	H	A	H	A	H	A	H	H	A	A
Result	W	L	W	L	D	L	L	L	D	W	D	L	L	D	W	W	W	D
Position	3	4	3	5	6	7	8	9	9	8	8	9	9	9	9	7	7	7

Updated to match(es) played on November 3, 2014. Source: Match reports
A = Away; H = Home; W = Win; D = Draw; L = Loss

==== Match reports ====
July 12, 2014 Match 1	Carolina RailHawks	1–2	Indy Eleven	Cary, North Carolina
19:30 EDT	Martínez 24'; King (red card) 57'; Albadawi (yellow card) 62'; Low (yellow card) 85'	Summary	Estridge (yellow card) 10'; Spencer 65'; Smart 87'	Stadium: WakeMed Soccer Park; Attendance: 3,080; Referee: Chris Penso

July 19, 2014 Match 2	Indy Eleven	1–2	Tampa Bay Rowdies	Indianapolis, Indiana
19:30 EDT	Kléberson 38'	Report; Report	Townsend 43'; Hristov (yellow card) 45', (goal) 89'	Stadium: Michael A. Carroll Stadium; Attendance: 10,555; Referee: Hilario Grajedo

July 27, 2014 Match 3	FC Edmonton	0–1	Indy Eleven	Edmonton, Alberta
16:00 EDT		Summary	Kléberson 90+3'	Stadium: Clarke Stadium; Attendance: 3,152; Referee: Chris Grabas

August 2, 2014 Match 4	Indy Eleven	2–4	Atlanta Silverbacks	Indianapolis, Indiana
19:30 EDT	Kléberson 43' (pen.), 55' (pen.); Peña (red card) 65'	Summary	Burgos 5'; Cruz 21'; Chavez 46'; Sandoval 83'	Stadium: Carroll Stadium; Attendance: 10,285; Referee: Robert Sibiga

August 6, 2014 Match 5	Indy Eleven	0–0	Fort Lauderdale Strikers	Indianapolis, Indiana
19:30 EDT	Johnson (yellow card) 45+1' (red card) 58'	Summary		Stadium: Carroll Stadium; Attendance: 10,285; Referee: Mark Allatin

August 9, 2014 Match 6	San Antonio Scorpions	2–0	Indy Eleven	San Antonio, Texas
20:30 EDT	Zahorski 28'; James 38' (red card) 57'	Summary		Stadium: Toyota Field; Attendance: 7,847; Referee: Armando Villarreal

August 16, 2014 Match 7	Minnesota United FC	5–1	Indy Eleven	Blaine, Minnesota
20:00 EDT	Pitchkolan 25'; Ramirez 37', 58'; Mendes 45+2'; Watson 53'	Summary	Kléberson 71'	Stadium: National Sports Center; Attendance: 5,420; Referee: Nima Saghafi

August 23, 2014 Match 8	Indy Eleven	1–2	Ottawa Fury FC	Indianapolis, Indiana
19:30 EDT	Smart 84'	Summary	Heinemann 70' (pen.); Ubiparipović 86'	Stadium: Carroll Stadium; Attendance: 10,285; Referee: Chris Penso

August 30, 2014 Match 9	Indy Eleven	2–2	New York Cosmos	Indianapolis, Indiana
19:30 EDT	Ambersley 61'; Johnson 90'	Report	Diosa 6'; Stokkelien 42'	Stadium: Carroll Stadium; Attendance: 10,659; Referee: Sorin Stoica

September 6, 2014 Match 10	Atlanta Silverbacks	1–2	Indy Eleven	Atlanta
19:30 EDT	Gavin 45'	Summary	Johnson 15'; Smith 37'	Stadium: Atlanta Silverbacks Park; Attendance: 5,000; Referee: Robert Sibiga

September 13, 2014 Match 11	Indy Eleven	1–1	FC Edmonton	Edmonton, Alberta
19:30 EDT	Pineda 16'	Summary	Hlavaty 25'	Stadium: Clarke Stadium; Attendance: 10,567; Referee: Marcos de Oliveira

September 20, 2014 Match 12	Fort Lauderdale Strikers	2–1	Indy Eleven	Fort Lauderdale, Florida
19:30 EDT	Picault 1'; Núñez 55'	Summary	Frías 39'	Stadium: Lockhart Stadium; Attendance: 3,112; Referee: Marcos de Oliveira

September 27, 2014 Match 13	Indy Eleven	0–1	Carolina RailHawks	Indianapolis, Indiana
19:30 EDT		Summary	Albadawi 53'	Stadium: Carroll Stadium; Attendance: 10,285; Referee: Tyler Ploeger

October 4, 2014 Match 14	New York Cosmos	0–0	Indy Eleven	Hempstead, New York
20:00 EDT		Summary		Stadium: James M. Shuart Stadium; Attendance: 6,225; Referee: Jorge Gonzalez

October 11, 2014 Match 15	Indy Eleven	2–0	Minnesota United FC	Indianapolis, Indiana
19:30 EDT	Pineda 8'; Jhulliam 46'	Summary		Stadium: Carroll Stadium; Attendance: 10,285; Referee: Sorin Stoica

October 18, 2014 Match 16	Indy Eleven	1–0	San Antonio Scorpions	Indianapolis, Indiana
19:30 EDT	Rugg 56'	Summary		Stadium: Carroll Stadium; Attendance: 10,982; Referee: Alex Chilowicz

October 25, 2014 Match 17	Ottawa Fury FC	1–2	Indy Eleven	Ottawa, Ontario
14:00 EDT	Oliver (yellow card) 73' (goal) 90+1'; Ryan (red card) 90+3'	Summary	Jhulliam 29'; Pineda 89' (yellow card) 90+3'; Peña (red card) 90+3'	Stadium: TD Place Stadium; Attendance: 4,172; Referee: David Barrie

November 1, 2014 Match 18	Tampa Bay Rowdies	2–2	Indy Eleven	St. Petersburg, Florida
18:30 EDT	Frimpong 17'; Walker 89'	Summary	Miller (yellow card) 12'; Smart 47'; Jhulliam 88'	Stadium: Al Lang Stadium; Attendance: 6,377; Referee: Matthew Miscannon

=== U.S. Open Cup ===
As a member of the NASL, the Eleven enter the Open Cup in the 3rd Round. Indy's win over Dayton was the team's first ever non-friendly match victory.

==== Match reports ====
May 28, 2014 Third Round	Indy Eleven	5–2	Dayton Dutch Lions	Indianapolis, Indiana
7:30 p.m. EDT	Corrado (yellow card) 19'; Smith 26', 30', 88'; Ambersley 43'; Mares 46'; Hyland (yellow card) 66'; Moore (yellow card) 82'	Report	Walker (yellow card) 25', (goal) 76'; Schoenfeld 66' (pen.); DeLass (yellow card) 85'	Stadium: Carroll Stadium; Attendance: 9,181; Referee: Dimitar Chavdarov

June 17, 2014 Fourth Round	Columbus Crew	2–1 (a.e.t.)	Indy Eleven	Akron, Ohio
7:30 p.m. EDT	Añor 4'; Bedell (red card) 34'; Paladini (red card) 110'; Clark (yellow card) 112'; Arrieta 114' (pen.)	Report	Corrado (yellow card) 45+1'; Smith 62'; Estridge (yellow card) 78'; Moore (yellow card) 105'	Stadium: FirstEnergy Stadium; Attendance: 1,913; Referee: Dimitar Chavdarov

== Squad statistics ==
As of Match played November 1, 2014

=== Appearances and goals ===
No.	Pos	Nat	Player	Total		NASL Spring Season		NASL Fall Season		U.S. Open Cup	
No.	Pos	Nat	Player	Apps	Goals	Apps	Goals	Apps	Goals	Apps	Goals
2	DF	(United States) USA	Andrew Stone	7	0	2	0	5	0	0	0
3	DF	(United States) USA	Jaime Frías	25	1	7	0	17+1	1	0	0
4	MF	(United States) USA	Brad Ring	13	1	9	1	1+2	0	1	0
5	DF	(Honduras) HON	Erick Norales	23	2	8	2	13	0	2	0
6	DF	(United States) USA	Chris Estridge	11	1	3+1	1	3+3	0	1	0
7	FW	(Jamaica) JAM	Don Smart	28	3	1+8	0	8+9	3	1+1	0
8	MF	(Brazil) BRA	Kléberson	20	8	4+2	3	13+1	5	0	0
12	MF	(United States) USA	A. J. Corrado	16	0	7	0	5+2	0	2	0
13	MF	(England) ENG	Corby Moore	14	0	5+3	0	0+4	0	2	0
14	FW	(Jamaica) JAM	Jermaine Johnson	10	2	0	0	7+3	2	0	0
15	FW	(United States) USA	Mike Ambersley	28	7	9	5	15+2	1	2	1
16	DF	(United States) USA	Cory Miller	9	0	0	0	9	0	0	0
17	FW	(United States) USA	Ben Spencer	13	2	4+3	1	2+2	1	1+1	0
18	DF	(United States) USA	Kyle Hyland	18	0	9	0	8	0	1	0
19	MF	(United States) USA	Blake Smith	21	6	4	1	14+1	1	2	4
20	MF	(Honduras) HON	Sergio Peña	15	0	0	0	13+2	0	0	0
21	DF	(United States) USA	Marco Franco	6	0	0	0	6	0	0	0
22	MF	(United States) USA	Dylan Mares	26	1	4+3	0	7+10	0	1+1	1
23	DF	(United States) USA	Fejiro Okiomah	16	0	5	0	8+1	0	2	0
24	GK	(Germany) GER	Kristian Nicht	29	0	9	0	18	0	2	0
27	MF	(United States) USA	Victor Pineda	17	3	0	0	16	3	1	0
88	MF	(Brazil) BRA	Jhulliam	8	3	0	0	4+4	3	0	0
99	FW	(United States) USA	Charlie Rugg	5	1	0	0	5	1	0	0
Players who left Indy Eleven during the season:
9	FW	(Brazil) BRA	Pedro Ferreira-Mendes	14	0	4+5	0	0+3	0	1+1	0
21	MF	(Honduras) HON	Walter Ramírez	8	0	5+2	0	0	0	0+1	0
26	DF	(United States) USA	Baba Omosegbon	1	0	0	0	0	0	0+1	0

=== Goal scorers ===
Place	Position	Nation	Number	Name	NASL Spring Season	NASL Fall Season	U.S. Open Cup	Total
1	MF	(Brazil)	8	Kléberson	3	5	0	8
2	FW	(United States)	15	Mike Ambersley	5	1	1	7
3	FW	(United States)	19	Blake Smith	1	1	4	6
4	FW	(Jamaica)	7	Don Smart	0	3	0	3
4	MF	(United States)	27	Victor Pineda	0	3	0	3
4	MF	(Brazil)	88	Jhulliam	0	3	0	3
7	DF	(Honduras)	5	Erick Norales	2	0	0	2
7	FW	(United States)	17	Ben Spencer	1	1	0	2
7	FW	(Jamaica)	14	Jermaine Johnson	0	2	0	2
10	MF	(United States)	4	Brad Ring	1	0	0	1
10	DF	(United States)	3	Jaime Frías	0	1	0	1
10	FW	(United States)	99	Charlie Rugg	0	1	0	1
10				Own goal	1	0	0	1
10	MF	(United States)	22	Dylan Mares	0	0	1	1
TOTALS					14	21	6	41

=== Disciplinary record ===
Number	Nation	Position	Name	NASL Spring Season		NASL Fall Season		U.S. Open Cup		Total	
Number	Nation	Position	Name	Yellow card	Red card	Yellow card	Red card	Yellow card	Red card	Yellow card	Red card
3	(United States)	DF	Jaime Frías	1	0	4	0	0	0	5	0
4	(United States)	MF	Brad Ring	4	0	0	0	0	0	4	0
5	(Honduras)	DF	Erick Norales	5	0	1	0	1	0	7	0
6	(United States)	DF	Chris Estridge	1	0	2	0	1	0	4	0
7	(Jamaica)	FW	Don Smart	0	0	3	0	0	0	3	0
8	(Brazil)	MF	Kléberson	1	0	2	0	0	0	3	0
12	(United States)	MF	A. J. Corrado	1	0	0	0	2	0	3	0
13	(England)	MF	Corby Moore	1	0	1	0	2	0	4	0
14	(Jamaica)	FW	Jermaine Johnson	0	0	1	1	0	0	1	1
15	(United States)	FW	Mike Ambersley	1	0	1	0	0	0	2	0
16	(United States)	DF	Cory Miller	0	0	1	0	0	0	1	0
17	(United States)	FW	Ben Spencer	1	0	1	0	0	0	2	0
18	(United States)	DF	Kyle Hyland	2	0	2	0	1	0	5	0
19	(United States)	FW	Blake Smith	1	0	0	0	0	0	1	0
20	(Honduras)	MF	Sergio Peña	0	0	2	2	0	0	2	2
22	(United States)	MF	Dylan Mares	0	0	2	0	0	0	2	0
23	(United States)	DF	Fejiro Okiomah	0	1	1	0	0	0	1	1
27	(United States)	MF	Victor Pineda	0	0	3	0	0	0	3	0
99	(United States)	FW	Charlie Rugg	0	0	1	0	0	0	1	0
Players who left Indy Eleven during the season:
9	(Brazil)	FW	Pedro Ferreira-Mendes	2	0	0	0	1	0	3	0
			TOTALS	24	1	26	3	8	0	58	4

== Transfers ==
=== In ===
No.	Pos.	Player	Transferred from	Fee/notes	Date	Source
24	GK	(Germany) Kristian Nicht	(United States) Rochester Rhinos	Free agent	October 1, 2013	
26	DF	(United States) Baba Omosegbon		Free agent	November 11, 2013	
1	GK	(United States) Nathan Sprenkel		Free agent	November 11, 2013	
5	DF	(Honduras) Erick Norales	(Honduras) CD Vida	Free agent	November 26, 2013	
9	FW	(Brazil) Pedro Mendes	(United States) Atlanta Silverbacks	Free agent	December 11, 2013	
18	DF	(United States) Kyle Hyland	(United States) Columbus Crew	Free agent	December 11, 2013	
7	MF	(Jamaica) Don Smart	(United States) RVA FC	Free agent	December 11, 2013	
16	DF	(United States) Chris Wey		Free agent	December 11, 2013	
4	MF	(United States) Brad Ring	(United States) Portland Timbers	Free agent	January 22, 2014	
15	FW	(United States) Mike Ambersley	(United States) Minnesota United	Free agent	January 22, 2014	
21	MF	(Honduras) Walter Ramirez	(United States) San Antonio Scorpions	Free agent	January 30, 2014	
35	GK	(United States) Jon Dawson	(United States) Jersey Express	Free agent	February 25, 2014	
6	DF	(United States) Chris Estridge	(United States) Rochester Rhinos	Free agent	February 25, 2014	
2	DF	(United States) Andrew Stone		Free agent	February 25, 2014	
13	MF	(England) Corby Moore	(England) Southampton FC	Free agent	March 12, 2014	
17	FW	(United States) Ben Spencer	(Norway) Molde FK	Season-long loan	March 12, 2014	
8	MF	(Brazil) Kleberson	(Brazil) Bahia	Free agent	April 2, 2014	
3	DF	(Mexico) Jaime Frías	(Mexico) C.D. Guadalajara	Loan	April 8, 2014	
12	MF	(United States) A. J. Corrado		Free agent	April 8, 2014	
22	MF	(United States) Dylan Mares		Free agent	April 11, 2014	
23	DF	(United States) Fejiro Okiomah	(United States) Charlotte Eagles	Free agent	April 11, 2014	
20	MF	(Honduras) Sergio Peña	(Honduras) Real Sociedad	Loan	July 15, 2014	
27	MF	(United States) Victor Pineda	(United States) Chicago Fire	Loan	June 13, 2014	
14	FW	(Jamaica) Jermaine Johnson	(England) Sheffield Wednesday	Free	July 30, 2014	
88	FW	(Brazil) Jhulliam	(Moldova) Sheriff Tiraspol	Free	August 26, 2014	
16	DF	(United States) Cory Miller		Free agent	August 28, 2014	
21	DF	(United States) Marco Franco	(United States) Chicago Fire	Loan	September 12, 2014	
99	FW	(United States) Charlie Rugg	(United States) LA Galaxy	Loan	October 1, 2014	

=== Out ===
No.	Pos.	Player	Transferred to	Fee/notes	Date	Source
16	DF	(United States) Chris Wey		Released	July 8, 2014	
20	MF	(Colombia) Kevin Rozo		Released	July 8, 2014	
21	MF	(Honduras) Walter Ramírez		Released	July 8, 2014	
26	DF	(United States) Baba Omosegbon		Released	July 8, 2014	
9	FW	(Brazil) Pedro Mendes	(United States) Minnesota United FC		August 15, 2014	
