= 2012 Real Salt Lake season =

American soccer team season

Real Salt Lake
2012 season
- Owner: SCP Worldwide
- Coach: Jason Kreis
- Stadium: Rio Tinto Stadium
- MLS: Conference: 2nd Overall: 5th
- MLS Cup: Conference Semifinals
- U.S. Open Cup: Third round
- CONCACAF Champions League: Group stage
- Desert Diamond Cup: Third place
- Rocky Mountain Cup: Winners
- Highest home attendance: 20,415 v C.D. Chivas USA (March 24, 2012)
- Lowest home attendance: 16,444 v Portland Timbers (July 7, 2012)
- Average home league attendance: 18,897
- Biggest win: CHV 0-4 RSL (9/29)
- Biggest defeat: SJ 5-0 RSL (7/14)
Home colors	Away colors

The 2012 Real Salt Lake season was the team's eighth year of existence. The team's first game was on March 10 at the Home Depot Center against the Los Angeles Galaxy, which they won 3-1.

== Competitions ==
=== Desert Diamond Cup ===
==== Standings ====
Pos	Team	Pld	W	L	D	GF	GA	GD	Pts
1	New England Revolution	3	3	0	0	7	3	+4	9
2	LA Galaxy	3	1	2	0	5	5	0	3
3	New York Red Bulls	3	1	2	0	2	4	−2	3
4	Real Salt Lake	3	1	2	0	2	4	−2	3

==== Results ====
February 22, 2012 Group 1	Real Salt Lake	1–0	New York Red Bulls	Tucson, Arizona
20:00 MST	Paulo Jr. 75'	Report	Alvarez (yellow card) 33'	Stadium: Kino Stadium; Attendance: 5,547

February 25, 2012 Group 2	LA Galaxy	2–0	Real Salt Lake	Tucson, Arizona
18:00 MST				Stadium: Kino Stadium

February 29, 2012 Group 3	Real Salt Lake	1–2	New England Revolution	Tucson, Arizona
18:00 MST				Stadium: Kino Stadium

March 3, 2012 Third place match	New York Red Bulls	0–1	Real Salt Lake	Tucson, Arizona
TBD MST				Stadium: Kino Stadium

=== Major League Soccer ===
==== League standings ====
Western Conference

Pos	Team	Pld	W	L	T	GF	GA	GD	Pts	Qualification
1	San Jose Earthquakes	34	19	6	9	72	43	+29	66	Qualification for the conference semifinals
2	Real Salt Lake	34	17	11	6	46	35	+11	57	Qualification for the conference semifinals
3	Seattle Sounders FC	34	15	8	11	51	33	+18	56	Qualification for the conference semifinals
4	LA Galaxy	34	16	12	6	59	47	+12	54	Qualification for the knockout round
5	Vancouver Whitecaps FC	34	11	13	10	35	41	−6	43	Qualification for the knockout round
6	FC Dallas	34	9	13	12	42	47	−5	39	
7	Colorado Rapids	34	11	19	4	44	50	−6	37	
8	Portland Timbers	34	8	16	10	34	56	−22	34	
9	Chivas USA	34	7	18	9	24	58	−34	30	

Source: MLS

Overall

Pos	Team	Pld	W	L	T	GF	GA	GD	Pts	
1	San Jose Earthquakes (S)	34	19	6	9	72	43	+29	66	Qualification for the CONCACAF Champions League
2	Sporting Kansas City (U)	34	18	7	9	42	27	+15	63	Qualification for the CONCACAF Champions League
3	D.C. United	34	17	10	7	53	43	+10	58	
4	New York Red Bulls	34	16	9	9	57	46	+11	57	
5	Real Salt Lake	34	17	11	6	46	35	+11	57	
6	Chicago Fire	34	17	11	6	46	41	+5	57	
7	Seattle Sounders FC	34	15	8	11	51	33	+18	56	
8	LA Galaxy (C)	34	16	12	6	59	47	+12	54	Qualification for the CONCACAF Champions League
9	Houston Dynamo	34	14	9	11	48	41	+7	53	Qualification for the CONCACAF Champions League
10	Columbus Crew	34	15	12	7	44	44	0	52	
11	Vancouver Whitecaps FC	34	11	13	10	35	41	−6	43	
12	Montreal Impact	34	12	16	6	45	51	−6	42	Qualification for the CONCACAF Champions League
13	FC Dallas	34	9	13	12	42	47	−5	39	
14	Colorado Rapids	34	11	19	4	44	50	−6	37	
15	Philadelphia Union	34	10	18	6	37	45	−8	36	
16	New England Revolution	34	9	17	8	39	44	−5	35	
17	Portland Timbers	34	8	16	10	34	56	−22	34	
18	Chivas USA	34	7	18	9	24	58	−34	30	
19	Toronto FC (V)	34	5	21	8	36	62	−26	23	

Source: MLS
Rules for classification: 1) points; 2) head-to-head record; 3) goal difference; 4) number of goals scored
(C) MLS Cup champions; (S) Supporters' Shield winners; (U) U.S. Open Cup winners; (V) Canadian Championship winners

==== Results summary ====
Overall								Home						Away					
Pld	Pts	W	L	T	GF	GA	GD	W	L	T	GF	GA	GD	W	L	T	GF	GA	GD
34	57	17	11	6	46	35	+11	11	4	2	27	15	+12	6	7	4	19	20	−1

Last updated: October 27, 2012
Source: 2012 Major League Soccer season
Pld = Matches played; Pts = Points; W = Matches won; T = Matches tied; L = Matches lost; GF = Goals for; GA = Goals against; GD = Goal difference

==== Regular season ====
March 10, 2012 1	LA Galaxy	1–3	Real Salt Lake	Carson, CA
19:30 PDT	Buddle 71'	Report	Beckerman (yellow card) 36'; Franklin 73' (o.g.); Morales 80' (yellow card) 80'; Espíndola 85'	Stadium: The Home Depot Center; Attendance: 27,000; Referee: Kevin Stott

March 17, 2012 2	Real Salt Lake	2–0	New York Red Bulls	Sandy, UT
20:00 MDT	Gil (yellow card) 22'; Espindola 39'; Gil 58'	Report	Richards (yellow card) 10'; Cooper (yellow card) 72'; Holgersson (yellow card) 83'	Stadium: Rio Tinto Stadium; Attendance: 16,738; Referee: Hilario Grajeda

March 24, 2012 3	Real Salt Lake	0–1	C.D. Chivas USA	Sandy, UT
19:00 MDT	Schuler (yellow card) 12'	Report	Minda (yellow card) 46'; Vagenas (yellow card) 55'; Townsend 72'; Townsend (yellow card) 86'; Kennedy (yellow card) 90+3'	Stadium: Rio Tinto Stadium; Attendance: 20,415; Referee: Mark Kadlecik

March 31, 2012 4	Portland Timbers	2–3	Real Salt Lake	Portland, OR
19:00 PDT	Brunner (yellow card) 38'; Nagbe 48'; Nagbe 65'; Marcelin (yellow card) 85'	Report	Saborio 39' (pen.); Steele 89'; Beckerman (yellow card) 90+2'; Beckerman 90+3'	Stadium: Jeld-Wen Field; Attendance: 20,438; Referee: Jorge Gonzalez

April 4, 2012 5	Real Salt Lake	1–0	Montreal Impact	Sandy, UT
19:00 MDT	Paulo Jr. 13' (pen.)	Report	Felipe (yellow card) 80'	Stadium: Rio Tinto Stadium; Attendance: 20,191; Referee: Ricardo Salazar

April 7, 2012 6	Real Salt Lake	2–0	Colorado Rapids	Sandy, UT
19:00 MDT	Sabório 20'; Espínola 57'; Olave (yellow card) 74'; Beckerman (yellow card) 74'; Gil (yellow card) 81'	Report	Pickens (yellow card) 58'; Moor (yellow card) 81'	Stadium: Rio Tinto Stadium; Attendance: 16,870; Referee: Jair Marrufo

April 14, 2012 7	Sporting Kansas City	1–0	Real Salt Lake	Kansas City, KS
19:30 CDT	Collin 63'; Nagamura (yellow card) 76'		Johnson (yellow card) 51'; Steele (yellow card) 78'	Stadium: Livestrong Sporting Park; Attendance: 19,422; Referee: Kevin Stott

April 21, 2012 8	San Jose Earthquakes	3–1	Real Salt Lake	Santa Clara, CA
19:30 PDT	Moreno (yellow card) 22'; Dawkins (yellow card) 44'; Stephenson 45+2'; Lenhart (yellow card) 68'; Dawkins 90+2'; Wondolowski 90+3'		Espindola (red card) 29'; Beckerman (yellow card) 42'; Morales (yellow card) 47'; Beckerman 53'; Saborio (yellow card) 60'; Olave (red card) 69'	Stadium: Buck Shaw Stadium; Attendance: 10,202; Referee: Elias Bazakos

April 25, 2012 9	FC Dallas	1–1	Real Salt Lake	Frisco, TX
19:30 CDT	Shea 45+1' (pen.)		Johnson (yellow card) 27'; Bonfigli 72'	Stadium: FC Dallas Stadium; Attendance: 10,069; Referee: Geoff Gamble

April 28, 2012 10	Real Salt Lake	3–2	Toronto FC	Sandy, UT
19:00 MDT	Beckerman 7'; Olave (yellow card) 17'; Wingert (yellow card) 27'; Eckersley 57' (o.g.); Morales (yellow card) 61'; Steele 90+3'		Avila 48'; Henry 77'; Henry (yellow card) 78'; Frings (yellow card) 80'	Stadium: Rio Tinto Stadium; Attendance: 17,629; Referee: Silviu Petrescu

May 5, 2012 11	Real Salt Lake	2–1	New England Revolution	Sandy, UT
19:00 MDT	Saborio 33'; Olave (yellow card) 36'; Saborio 55'; Johnson (red card) 59'; Saborio (yellow card) 90+5'		Brettschneider 22'; Tierney (yellow card) 57'; Cárdenas (red card) 81'	Stadium: Rio Tinto Stadium; Attendance: 18,219; Referee: David Gantar

May 9, 2012 12	Chicago Fire	0–0	Real Salt Lake	Bridgeview, IL
19:30 CDT			Beckerman (yellow card) 71'	Stadium: Toyota Park; Attendance: 13,544; Referee: Jair Marrufo

May 12, 2012 13	Seattle Sounders FC	0–1	Real Salt Lake	Seattle, WA
19:00 PDT	Johnson (yellow card) 53'		Espindola 51'; Saborio (yellow card) 70'	Stadium: CenturyLink Field; Attendance: 39,312; Referee: Mark Geiger

May 26, 2012 14	Real Salt Lake	3–2	FC Dallas	Sandy, UT
19:00 MDT	Alvarez (yellow card) 37'; Saborio 59'; Saborio 76'; Borchers 90+3'; Espindola (yellow card) 90+6'		Hedges 75'; Perez 85'	Stadium: Rio Tinto Stadium; Attendance: 19,341; Referee: Abiodun Okulaja

June 16, 2012 15	C.D. Chivas USA	0–3	Real Salt Lake	Carson, CA
19:30 PDT	Minda (yellow card) 73'		Wingert (yellow card) 38'; Espindola 41'; Espindola 54'; Saborio (yellow card) 71'; Johnson 90+4'	Stadium: Home Depot Center; Attendance: 13,816; Referee: Yader Reyes

June 20, 2012 16	Real Salt Lake	2–3	Los Angeles Galaxy	Sandy, UT
19:00 MDT	Beckerman 9'; Saborio 24'; Steele (yellow card) 53'; Morales (yellow card) 66'; Espindola (yellow card) 80'		Donovan 29'; Magee 50'; DeLaGarza (yellow card) 53'; Donovan 68'	Stadium: Rio Tinto Stadium; Attendance: 20,382; Referee: Kevin Stott

June 23, 2012 17	Real Salt Lake	1–2	San Jose Earthquakes	Sandy, UT
19:00 MDT	Beckerman (yellow card) 46'; Morales 79'; Espindola (yellow card) 90'		Stephenson (yellow card) 41'; Gordon 75'; Wondolowski 84'	Stadium: Rio Tinto Stadium; Attendance: 18,050; Referee: Jair Marrufo

June 30, 2012 18	Columbus Crew	2–0	Real Salt Lake	Columbus, OH
20:00 EDT	Tchani 16'; Vukovic (yellow card) 38'; Gaven 44'; George (yellow card) 82'		Espindola (yellow card) 57'; Steele (yellow card) 65'	Stadium: Crew Stadium; Attendance: 19,674; Referee: Jorge Gonzalez

July 4, 2012 19	Real Salt Lake	0–0	Seattle Sounders FC	Sandy, UT
20:00 MDT	Saborio (yellow card) 41'; Wingert (yellow card) 56'; Espindola (yellow card) 86'		Hurtado (yellow card) 41'; Gonzalez (yellow card) 46'	Stadium: Rio Tinto Stadium; Attendance: 20,363; Referee: Hilario Grajeda

July 7, 2012 20	Real Salt Lake	3–0	Portland Timbers	Sandy, UT
19:00 MDT	Saborio 60'; Saborio 62'; Johnson (yellow card) 65'; Saborio 75' (pen.)		Horst (yellow card) 66'; Chara (yellow card) 66'; Palmer (yellow card) 67'; Smith (yellow card) 68'; Chara (red card) 74'; Danso (yellow card) 80'	Stadium: Rio Tinto Stadium; Attendance: 16,444; Referee: Mark Geiger

July 14, 2012 21	San Jose Earthquakes	5–0	Real Salt Lake	Santa Clara, CA
19:30 PDT	Wondolowski 19', 73', 80'; Chávez (yellow card) 26'; Morrow (yellow card) 60'; Gordon 63'; Dawkins 79'	Report	Watson-Siriboe (yellow card) 16'; Olave (yellow card) 44'; Beckerman (red card) 58'; Espíndola (yellow card) 59'; Mansally (yellow card) 62'; Steele (yellow card) 69'	Stadium: Buck Shaw Stadium; Attendance: 10,744; Referee: Allen Chapman

July 21, 2012 22	Real Salt Lake	2–0	Colorado Rapids	Sandy, UT
20:00 MDT	Saborio 32'; Steele (yellow card) 82'; Johnson 90'		Nane (yellow card) 45'	Stadium: Rio Tinto Stadium; Attendance: 19,492; Referee: Silviu Petrescu

July 27, 2012 23	Real Salt Lake	2–1	Vancouver Whitecaps FC	Sandy, UT
19:00 MDT	Saborio 34', 58'		DeMerit (yellow card) 33'; Mattocks 52' (yellow card) 86'; Cannon (red card) 76'	Stadium: Rio Tinto Stadium; Attendance: 18,702; Referee: Kevin Stott

August 4, 2012 24	Colorado Rapids	1–0	Real Salt Lake	Commerce City, CO
19:00 MDT	Nane 38'			Stadium: Dick's Sporting Goods Park; Attendance: 15,218; Referee: Jorge Gonzalez

August 11, 2012 25	Vancouver Whitecaps FC	2 - 1	Real Salt Lake	Vancouver, BC
16:00 PDT	Rochat (yellow card) 41'; Koffie (yellow card) 49'; Camilo Sanvezzo 58'; Richards 64'; Davidson (yellow card) 83'	Summary	Beltran (yellow card) 37'; Borchers 90+2'	Stadium: BC Place; Attendance: 20,083; Referee: Paul Ward

August 18, 2012 26	Real Salt Lake	1 - 2	FC Dallas	Sandy, UT
19:00 MDT	Beltran (yellow card) 14'; Watson-Siriboe (yellow card) 20'; Espinolda (yellow card) 25'; Saborio 76'	Report	Hedges (yellow card) 54'; Castillo 61'; Ferreira 94'	Stadium: Rio Tinto Stadium; Attendance: 20,281; Referee: Juan Guzman

August 24, 2012 27	Philadelphia Union	0 - 0	Real Salt Lake	Chester, PA
19:30 EDT	M. Farfan (yellow card) 59'	Report	Wingert (yellow card) 58'	Stadium: PPL Park; Attendance: 18,441; Referee: Jai Marrufo

September 1, 2012 28	Real Salt Lake	1 - 0	D.C. United	Sandy, UT
19:00 MDT	Morales (yellow card) 25'; Johnson 49'; Wingert (yellow card) 71'; Watson-Siriboe (yellow card) 82'	Report	Saragosa (yellow card) 60'; Dudar (yellow card) 78'; Korb (yellow card) 87'	Stadium: Rio Tinto Stadium; Attendance: 20,334; Referee: Silviu Petrescu

September 6, 2012 29	Houston Dynamo	1 - 0	Real Salt Lake	Houston, TX
19:30 CDT	Clark (yellow card) 64'; Carr (yellow card) 64'; Clark 94'	Report	Steele (yellow card) 84'	Stadium: BBVA Compass Stadium; Attendance: 18,452; Referee: Ismail Elfath

September 22, 2012 30	Real Salt Lake	2 - 1	Portland Timbers	Sandy, UT
18:00 MDT	Espindola 14'; Morales 36'; Olave (yellow card) 81'	Report	Dike 61'	Stadium: Rio Tinto Stadium; Attendance: 20,524; Referee: Kevin Stott

September 29, 2012 31	C.D. Chivas USA	0 - 4	Real Salt Lake	Carson, CA
19:30 PDT	Bolaños (yellow card) 15'; Minda (yellow card) 21'	Report	Saborío 8', 11', 65'; Wingert (yellow card) 20'; Paulo 81'	Stadium: Home Depot Center; Attendance: 11,450; Referee: Juan Guzman

October 6, 2012 32	LA Galaxy	1 - 2	Real Salt Lake	Carson, CA
18:00 PDT	Keane 17'; Gaul (yellow card) 64'	Report	Espindola 25', 28'; Beltran (yellow card) 71'	Stadium: Home Depot Center; Attendance: 27,000; Referee: Baldomero Toledo

October 17, 2012 33	Seattle Sounders FC	0 - 0	Real Salt Lake	Seattle, WA
20:00 PDT	Scott (yellow card) 10'; Scott (red card) 30'; Tiffert (yellow card) 67'	Report	Beltran (yellow card) 46'; Schuler (yellow card) 51'	Stadium: CenturyLink Field; Attendance: 38,356; Referee: Ricardo Salazar

October 27, 2012 34	Real Salt Lake	0 - 0	Vancouver Whitecaps FC	Sandy, UT
19:00 MDT	Wingert (yellow card) 36'; Johnson (yellow card) 82'	Report	DeMerit (yellow card) 47'	Stadium: Rio Tinto Stadium; Attendance: 20,507; Referee: Baldomero Toledo

==== Playoffs ====
November 2, 2012 Conference; Semi-finals	Seattle Sounders FC	0–0	Real Salt Lake	Seattle, Washington
19:00 PDT	Parke (yellow card) 45+2'; Evans (yellow card) 54'	Report	Beckerman (yellow card) 53'; Morales (yellow card) 56'	Stadium: CenturyLink Field; Attendance: 34,941; Referee: Hilario Grajeda

November 8, 2012 Conference; Semi-finals	Real Salt Lake	0 - 1	Seattle Sounders FC	Sandy, UT
19:30 MST		Report	Alonso (yellow card) 51'; Martinez 81'	Stadium: Rio Tinto Stadium; Attendance: 19,657; Referee: Chris Penso

Seattle Sounders won on 1 - 0 aggregate

=== U.S. Open Cup ===
May 29, 2012 Third Round	Real Salt Lake	1–3	Minnesota Stars	Sandy, UT
19:00 MDT	Gil 29'; Velásquez (yellow card) 83'; Olave (yellow card) 85'		Venegas 3'; Hlavaty 45' (pen.); Bracalello 58'	Stadium: Rio Tinto Stadium; Attendance: 17,212; Referee: Tyler Ploeger

=== CONCACAF Champions League ===
July 31, 2012 Group stage	Herediano	1–0	Real Salt Lake	Heredia, Costa Rica
	Aguilar 14'		Saborio (yellow card) 7'; Beckerman (yellow card) 43'; Borchers (red card) 58'	Stadium: Estadio Eladio Rosabal Cordero; Referee: Francisco Chacon

August 21, 2012 Group stage	Real Salt Lake	2–0	Tauro	Sandy, UT
22:00	Saborío 48'; Beckerman 58'	Report		Stadium: Rio Tinto Stadium; Attendance: 20,430; Referee: Oscar Reyna (Guatemala)

September 18, 2012 Group stage	Tauro	0–1	Real Salt Lake	Panama City, Panama
20:00		Report	Saborío 90+4' (pen.)	Stadium: Estadio Rommel Fernández; Attendance: 674; Referee: Mauricio Morales (Mexico)

October 23, 2012 Group stage	Real Salt Lake	0–0	Herediano	Sandy, UT
22:00		Report		Stadium: Rio Tinto Stadium; Attendance: 20,436; Referee: Elmer Bonilla (El Salvador)

== Roster & Transfers ==
=== Roster ===
Roster on September 27, 2012.

No.	Position	Nation	Player
1	GK	MEX	Lalo Fernández (HGP)
2	DF	USA	Tony Beltran
3	DF	USA	Kwame Watson-Siriboe
4	DF	COL	Jámison Olave
5	MF	USA	Kyle Beckerman (C)
6	DF	USA	Nat Borchers
7	FW	ARG	Fabián Espíndola
8	MF	CAN	Will Johnson
11	MF	ARG	Javier Morales (DP)
12	MF	ARG	Emiliano Bonfigli
13	FW	USA	Justin Braun
14	MF	CUB	Yordany Álvarez
15	FW	CRC	Álvaro Saborío (DP)
16	MF	USA	Nico Muñiz (HGP)
17	DF	USA	Chris Wingert
18	GK	USA	Nick Rimando
19	MF	URU	Enzo Martínez (GA)
20	MF	USA	Ned Grabavoy
21	MF	USA	Luis Gil (GA)
22	MF	NIR	Jonny Steele
23	FW	BRA	Paulo Jr.
24	GK	USA	Kyle Reynish
25	MF	POR	David Viana
26	MF	COL	Sebastián Velásquez
28	DF	USA	Chris Schuler
29	DF	GAM	Abdoulie Mansally
53	DF	JPN	Terukazu Tanaka

=== In ===
No.	Pos.	Player	Transferred from	Fee/notes	Date	Ref.
14	MF	(Cuba) Yordany Álvarez	(United States) Orlando City	Undisclosed	January 26, 2012	
23	FW	(Brazil) Paulo Jr.	(United States) Fort Lauderdale Strikers	Free	February 9, 2012	
22	MF	(Northern Ireland) Jonny Steele	Unattached	Free	March 1, 2012	
53	DF	(Japan) Terukazu Tanaka	Unattached	Free	March 1, 2012	
25	DF	(United States) Chris Estridge	(Canada) Vancouver Whitecaps FC	Trade	April 12, 2012	
29	DF	(The Gambia) Abdoulie Mansally	Unattached	Free	June 20, 2012	
3	DF	(United States) Kwame Watson-Siriboe	(United States) Chicago Fire	Trade	June 27, 2012	
13	FW	(United States) Justin Braun	(Canada) Montreal Impact	Trade	July 11, 2012	
25	MF	(Portugal) David Viana	(Spain) Atlético Madrid	Free	September 14, 2012	

=== MLS Drafts ===
Pos.	Player	Acquired From	Fee/notes	Date	Ref.
MF	(Uruguay) Enzo Martínez	(United States) UNC Tar Heels	SuperDraft, 1st Round, Pick 17	January 12, 2012	
MF	(Brazil) Diogo de Almeida	(United States) Southern Methodist Mustangs	SuperDraft, 2nd Round, Pick 24	January 12, 2012	
MF	(Colombia) Sebastián Velásquez	(United States) Spartanburg Methodist College Pioneers	SuperDraft, 2nd Round, Pick 36	January 12, 2012	
MF	(Australia) Andy Rose	(United States) UCLA Bruins	Supplemental Draft, 1st Round, Pick 4	January 17, 2012	
MF	(Argentina) Emiliano Bonfigli	(Ecuador) Manta FC	Supplemental Draft, 1st Round, Pick 17	January 17, 2012	
FW	(Luxembourg) Oliver Kupe	(United States) Northwestern Wildcats	Supplemental Draft, 2nd Round, Pick 36	January 17, 2012	
MF	(Peru) Benjamín Ubierna	(Peru) Universidad San Martín de Porres	Supplemental Draft, 3rd Round, Pick 55	January 17, 2012	

=== Out ===
No.	Pos.	Player	Transferred to	Fee/notes	Date	Ref.
26	MF	(United States) Collen Warner	(Canada) Montreal Impact	Expansion Draft	November 23, 2011	
3	DF	(United States) Robbie Russell	(United States) DC United	Trade	November 29, 2011	
12	MF	(Haiti) Jean Alexandre	(United States) San Jose Earthquakes	Trade	December 1, 2011	
10	MF	(Guatemala) Arturo Álvarez	(United States) Chivas USA	Re-Entry Draft	December 5, 2011	
27	FW	(United States) Cody Arnoux	N/A (Waived)	Waived	June 28, 2012	
25	FW	(United States) Chris Estridge	N/A (Waived)	Waived	June 28, 2012	

=== Loan out ===
No.	Pos.	Player	Loaned to	Start	End	Ref.
23	FW	(Brazil) Paulo Jr.	(United States) Fort Lauderdale Strikers	July 17, 2012	December 3, 2012	

== Miscellany ==
=== Allocation ranking ===
Real Salt Lake is in the #17 position in the MLS Allocation Ranking. The allocation ranking is the mechanism used to determine which MLS club has first priority to acquire a U.S. National Team player who signs with MLS after playing abroad, or a former MLS player who returns to the league after having gone to a club abroad for a transfer fee. A ranking can be traded, provided that part of the compensation received in return is another club's ranking.

=== International roster spots ===
Real Salt Lake has 6 MLS International Roster Slots for use in the 2012 season. Each club in Major League Soccer is allocated 8 international roster spots and Real Salt Lake has traded away two spots permanently, one to Chivas USA in 2004 and the other to Colorado Rapids in 2005.

=== Future draft pick trades ===
Future picks acquired: *2013 MLS SuperDraft Round 3 pick from D.C. United; *Unspecified year conditional draft pick from Seattle Sounders FC.
Future picks traded: *2013 MLS SuperDraft conditional pick to Vancouver Whitecaps FC; *2014 MLS SuperDraft round 4 pick to Chicago Fire; *2014 MLS SuperDraft conditional pick to Montreal Impact.
