= Don Smart =

Jamaican footballer (born 1987)

Personal information
- Full name: Don Smart
- Date of birth: 2 December 1987 (age 38)
- Place of birth: Kingston, Jamaica
- Positions: Winger; attacking midfielder; forward

Senior career*
Years	Team	Apps	(Gls)
2011	F.C. New York	12	(0)
2012	Fredericksburg Hotspur	6	(7)
2013	RVA FC	7	(9)
2014–2017	Indy Eleven	95	(10)
2018	Miami FC 2	14	(3)
2018	Fresno FC	4	(0)
2019–2020	Forward Madison	43	(9)
2021–2022	Greenville Triumph	49	(4)
2023	Lexington SC	23	(6)
- * Club domestic league appearances and goals as of 16 October 2023

Don Smart (born 2 December 1987) is a Jamaican footballer who currently plays as a midfielder. He is also capable of playing as a striker or outside back.

== Career ==
In 2011, Smart joined the USL PRO side F.C. New York and made 12 appearances during the 2011 season. He then moved on to the USL Premier Development League side Fredericksburg Hotspur in 2012, scoring seven goals in just six appearances. IN 2013, he moved to the Virginia-based NPSL club RVA Football Club to play for the team during their inaugural season. During his time with the team, RVA FC won the NPSL Championship. Smart made seven appearances in the campaign, tallying nine goals.

Smart then joined Indy Eleven for their inaugural season in 2014. The Jamaican can line up on either wide side of the Indy Eleven midfield, but can also be comfortably deployed as a striker or outside back. He made his debut for the club in Indy Eleven's inaugural match against the Carolina Railhawks. He scored his first goal for the club in a 2–1 against Carolina on 12 July 2014. He would finish the 2014 season with three goals and three assists over 1,032 minutes. The 2015 season would yield similar returns as Smart finished with three goals and three assists over the course of 1,220 minutes.

Smart spent the 2018 season with National Premier Soccer League club Miami FC 2, registering a team-high seven assists during the course of the season.

In August 2018, Smart moved to Fresno FC, arriving alongside Mark Pais. He made his league debut for the club on 9 September 2018, coming on as a 46th-minute substitute for Cory Brown in a 1–0 away defeat to Swope Park Rangers.

In October 2018, Smart was unveiled as the first ever signing for USL League One expansion side Forward Madison FC. He played all ninety minutes of Madison's first league fixture, a 1–0 away defeat to Chattanooga Red Wolves.

On 15 December 2020, it was announced Smart was moving to USL League One side Greenville Triumph ahead of their 2021 season.

Smart joined League One expansion side Lexington SC on 26 January 2023.

== Career statistics ==
=== Club ===
As of match played 29 October 2017

Appearances and goals by club, season and competition
Club	Season	League			National Cup		Other		Total	
Club	Season	Division	Apps	Goals	Apps	Goals	Apps	Goals	Apps	Goals
F.C. New York	2011	NPSL	12	0	1	0	–		13	0
Indy Eleven	2014	NASL	27	3	2	0	-		29	3
Indy Eleven	2015	NASL	25	3	1	0	-		26	3
Indy Eleven	2016	NASL	22	2	1	0	2	0	25	2
Indy Eleven	2017	NASL	21	2	0	0	-		21	2
Indy Eleven	Total		95	10	4	0	2	0	101	10
Career total			107	10	5	0	2	0	114	10
