= Sergio Peña (Honduran footballer) =

Honduran footballer (born 1987)

Personal information
- Full name: Sergio Salvador Peña Zelaya
- Date of birth: 9 May 1987 (age 39)
- Place of birth: Tocoa, Colón, Honduras
- Height: 1.86 m (6 ft 1 in)
- Position: Midfielder

Team information
- Current team: Vida

Youth career
- 2007–2009: Real Sociedad

Senior career*
Years	Team	Apps	(Gls)
2009–2013	Real Sociedad	57	(5)
2014	→ Indy Eleven (loan)	15	(0)
2015	Indy Eleven	12	(2)
2016–2018	Real Sociedad	74	(3)
2018–2021	Motagua	70	(5)
2021-	Vida	15	(1)

International career^{‡}
2017	Honduras	4	(0)
- * Club domestic league appearances and goals as of 1 November 2021 ‡ National team caps and goals as of 1 November 2021

Sergio Salvador Peña Zelaya (born 9 May 1987) is a Honduran footballer who actually play for C.D.S. Vida in the Honduran Liga Nacional.

== Career ==
In July 2014, Peña joined Indy Eleven on loan for the remainder of the 2014 NASL season. Peña re-signed for Indy Eleven in February 2015.

== Career statistics ==
As of match played 30 October 2015

Appearances and goals by club, season and competition
Club	Season	League			National Cup		Continental		Total	
Club	Season	Division	Apps	Goals	Apps	Goals	Apps	Goals	Apps	Goals
Indy Eleven (loan)	2014	NASL	15	0	0	0	–		15	0
Indy Eleven	2015	NASL	12	2	0	0	–		12	2
Career total			27	2	0	0	-	-	27	2
