= Kyle Hyland =

American soccer player (born 1991)

Personal information
- Full name: Kyle Hyland
- Date of birth: March 1, 1991 (age 35)
- Place of birth: Bay Village, Ohio, United States
- Height: 1.70 m (5 ft 7 in)
- Position: Defender

College career
Years	Team	Apps	(Gls)
2009–2012	IUPUI Jaguars		

Senior career*
Years	Team	Apps	(Gls)
2013	Columbus Crew	0	(0)
2014–2015	Indy Eleven	35	(1)
2016–2020	Oklahoma City Energy	105	(6)
- * Club domestic league appearances and goals as of October 6, 2020

Kyle Hyland (born March 1, 1991) is an American former professional soccer player.

== Career ==
=== College ===
Hyland played at IUPUI in Indianapolis from 2009 to 2012. In his freshman year, Hyland was selected as the team's freshman captain. In his freshman season he appeared in all of the team's 19 games, 16 of which were starts. Hyland made 3 attempts at the net but was unsuccessful. In his sophomore year (2010) he appeared in 17 matches, all of which were starts. Hyland also scored one goal and one assist. In his junior year (2011) of college he started all 18 matches the team participated in that season. Hyland made one goal and lead the team with 4 assists. He played 1,611 minutes in his junior year which set a new team record for most minutes played in a single season. Hyland also lead the team in shot attempts. In his senior year (2012) of college he racked up eight goals including 2 games with multiple goals and made 3 game winning goals his senior year.

=== Columbus Crew ===
The Columbus Crew of MLS picked Hyland up in the MLS 2013 preseason and was placed with the crew reserves. He managed 11 appearances with the crew reserves, 9 of which were starts for the crew reserves. Hyland also received 1 red card in the 2013 season. Hyland was the first player in IUPUI history to graduate and immediately sign a Soccer Club contract without going through the MLS SuperDraft.

=== Indy Eleven ===
Hyland spent 2014–2015 with Indy Eleven of the North American Soccer League.

=== OKC Energy FC ===
Hyland moved to OKC Energy FC for the 2016 season.

== Career statistics ==
As of October 13, 2018

Club	Season	League			Playoffs		Cup		Continental		Total	
Club	Season	Division	Apps	Goals	Apps	Goals	Apps	Goals	Apps	Goals	Apps	Goals
Columbus Crew	2013	MLS	0	0	–		0	0	–		0	0
Indy Eleven	2014	NASL	17	0	–		1	0	–		18	0
Indy Eleven	2015	NASL	18	1	–		1	0	–		19	1
Indy Eleven	Total		35	1	0	0	2	0	0	0	37	1
OKC Energy	2016	USL	22	2	1	0	2	1	–		25	3
OKC Energy	2017	USL	30	2	3	0	3	0	–		36	2
OKC Energy	2018	USL	24	0	–		1	0	–		25	0
OKC Energy	Total		76	4	4	0	6	1	0	0	86	5
Career total			111	5	4	0	8	1	0	0	123	6
