= Jhulliam =

Brazilian footballer

Personal information
- Full name: Jhulliam Bonfim Santos Pires
- Date of birth: 4 April 1988 (age 38)
- Place of birth: Vera Cruz, Bahia, Brazil
- Height: 1.82 m (6 ft 0 in)
- Position: Forward

Team information
- Current team: Pouso Alegre FC

Senior career*
Years	Team	Apps	(Gls)
2006–2011	Galícia	22	(18)
2009	→ São Cristóvão (loan)		
2009	→ Poções (loan)	15	(0)
2010	→ Bahia (loan)	3	(0)
2010	→ Madre de Deus (loan)	12	(4)
2011	→ Juazeiro (loan)	3	(0)
2012–2013	Coruripe		
2013	Chã Grande	17	(8)
2013	→ Alagoano (loan)		
2013–2014	Sheriff Tiraspol	16	(12)
2014	Indy Eleven	8	(3)
2015	Resende	15	(7)
2015	Al-Hilal Omdurman		
2016	Sampaio Corrêa	3	(0)
2016–2018	Resende	45	(16)
2017	→ ASA (loan)	15	(2)
2018	→ Volta Redonda (loan)	11	(1)
2019	Uberlândia	13	(12)
2019	Jacuipense	9	(1)
2020	Portuguesa-RJ	5	(2)
2020	Uberlândia	6	(1)
2020	Villa Nova	2	(0)
2020–	Pouso Alegre FC	9	(2)
- * Club domestic league appearances and goals as of 14:32, 25 December 2020 (UTC)

Jhulliam Bonfim Santos Pires (born 4 April 1988), or simply Jhulliam, is a Brazilian professional footballer who plays for Pouso Alegre FC.

== Career ==
Jhulliam was born Vera Cruz, Bahia. He signed for Moldovan National Division side FC Sheriff Tiraspol. On 26 August 2014, Jhulliam signed for North American Soccer League side Indy Eleven, with the club declining to renew his contract upon completion of the 2014 season.

== Honours ==
Sheriff Tiraspol

- Moldovan National Division: 2013–14
- Moldovan Super Cup: 2014;
