= Judson McKinney =

American soccer player (born 1988)

Personal information
- Full name: Judson McKinney
- Date of birth: August 4, 1988 (age 38)
- Place of birth: Cuyahoga Falls, Ohio, United States
- Height: 1.85 m (6 ft 1 in)
- Positions: Defender; midfielder

College career
Years	Team	Apps	(Gls)
2006–2009	Cincinnati Bearcats		

Senior career*
Years	Team	Apps	(Gls)
2008	Cleveland Internationals	10	(0)
2010	Dayton Dutch Lions	7	(0)
2011	Akron Summit Assault	8	(0)
2011–2012	Ohio Vortex (indoor)	9	(4)
2012–2012	Charlotte Eagles	10	(0)
2012–2013	Chicago Soul FC (indoor)	2	(0)
2013–2014	Milwaukee Wave (indoor)	24	(3)
2015	Indy Eleven	2	(1)
- * Club domestic league appearances and goals as of December 6, 2015

Judson McKinney (born August 4, 1988) is an American soccer player from Cuyahoga Falls, Ohio.

== High school ==
McKinney was a 4-year Varsity Letter winner during his high school years at Cuyahoga Valley Christian Academy. In 2004, he helped his team to win the state championship while earning all-district and all-county honors.

== College ==
Judson attended the University of Cincinnati in Ohio where he majored in engineering. He began playing for the Bearcats in 2006 when he started all 19 matches as a defender. He earned his first career assist and was also named the team's Top Newcomer. During his next season McKinney was moved to central midfield and earned 2 assists while logging over 1,700 minutes of playing time and starting 20 matches.

== Professional career ==
After four seasons at the University of Cincinnati, McKinney joined USL Premier Development League club Dayton Dutch Lions for the 2010 where he made seven appearances.

A couple years later, McKinney signed his first professional contract with USL Pro club Charlotte Eagles and made his debut on April 7, 2012, in a 2–0 loss to Orlando City.

On October 17, 2012, it was announced that McKinney had signed with the now defunct Chicago Soul FC of the MISL. He earned two caps before suffering a season-ending injury against the Baltimore Blast. In the 1st quarter of McKinney's 2nd match for Chicago Soul FC he collided with the boards and broke the humerus bone in his left arm. During his 2 caps he managed 3 shots on goal.

After being sidelined for the 2012–2013 season by the injury and surgery to his left arm McKinney signed on with the Milwaukee Wave. It was announced on Monday, October 4, 2013, that McKinney had been signed to a 2-year contract with the Wave.

In March 2015, McKinney signed for NASL side Indy Eleven.
