= Jeff Belskus =

American autoracing executive

Jeffrey "Jeff" Belskus is a sports executive and the former president and chief executive officer of Hulman & Company. At the time, Hulman & Company was also the owner of the Indianapolis Motor Speedway Corporation, of which Belskus also served as the president and CEO. Belskus was appointed to his position at the Hulman & Company on October 1, 2011, after serving in his leadership role at Indianapolis Motor Speedway for over 2 years. He remained in that role until Mark Miles was named CEO of Hulman & Company on December 17, 2012, and J. Douglas Boles was named president of the Indianapolis Motor Speedway on July 9, 2013.

Prior to being named president and CEO at the Indianapolis Motor Speedway, Belskus served as EVP and chief financial officer for Hulman & Company of Terre Haute, Indiana and its subsidiaries, including Indianapolis Motor Speedway and the IndyCar Series since 1994.

He was president of the soccer club Indy Eleven from 2016 to the end of 2018.

== Early career ==
Belskus graduated with honors from Indiana State University (ISU) in 1981. During this period at the ISU, he pledged the fraternity Sigma Alpha Epsilon. He earned a bachelor's degree in accounting and in 1985, he earned his CPA credential for the state of Indiana. He joined Indianapolis Motor Speedway two years later.

== Executive leadership ==
Indianapolis Motor Speedway is host annually to the world-renowned Indianapolis 500, which celebrated its 100th anniversary in 2011. Additionally, Belskus manages the involvement by IMS as it hosts the NASCAR Sprint Cup Series' Brickyard 400 and the Red Bull USGP motorcycle race, which are both held annually at the facility. Collectively, these 3 events generate an economic impact for Indiana's economy of approximately $725 million every year.

Belskus took over as interim CEO of Indycar on October 28, 2012, after the ouster of Randy Bernard.
