= Chris Estridge =

American soccer player (born 1989)

Personal information
- Full name: Christopher Estridge
- Date of birth: September 21, 1989 (age 37)
- Place of birth: Brownsburg, Indiana, United States
- Height: 5 ft 11 in (1.80 m)
- Position: Defender

Youth career
- 2008–2009: Wake Forest Demon Deacons
- 2010–2011: Indiana Hoosiers

Senior career*
Years	Team	Apps	(Gls)
2009–2010	Carolina Dynamo	12	(4)
2011	Chicago Fire Premier	14	(7)
2012	Real Salt Lake	0	(0)
2012–2013	Rochester Rhinos	7	(0)
2014	Indy Eleven	11	(0)
2015	Carolina RailHawks	0	(0)
2015	Charlotte Independence	0	(0)
- * Club domestic league appearances and goals

Christopher Estridge (born September 21, 1989) is an American former professional soccer player who played as a defender.

== Career ==
=== College and amateur ===
Estridge was born in Brownsburg, Indiana. He started his college soccer career at Wake Forest University in 2008, before moving to Indiana University in 2010. Estridge was named NSCAA All-American First Team and All-Big Ten Conference First Team in 2011.

Estridge played for USL Premier Development League club Chicago Fire Premier in 2011.

=== Professional ===
Vancouver Whitecaps FC selected Estridge in the second round (No. 21 overall) of the 2012 MLS SuperDraft. However, he was cut by the club on February 17, 2012, during their pre-season and was later traded to Real Salt Lake in exchange for a conditional 2013 MLS Supplemental Draft pick on April 11, 2012.

Estridge was released by Salt Lake on June 28, 2012. He was later signed by USL Professional Division club Rochester Rhinos.

Estridge moved to USL club Charlotte Independence on March 25, 2015.

== Career statistics ==
Club performance			League		Cup		League Cup		Continental		Total	
Season	Club	League	Apps	Goals	Apps	Goals	Apps	Goals	Apps	Goals	Apps	Goals
USA			League		Open Cup		League Cup		North America		Total	
2012	Real Salt Lake	Major League Soccer	0	0	0	0	0	0	0	0	0	0
2012-13	Rochester Rhinos	USL Pro	12	4	0	0	0	0	0	0	12	4
2014	Indy Eleven	North American Soccer League	2	0	0	0	0	0	0	0	2	0
career total			14	4	0	0	0	0	0	0	14	4

all Statistics as of April 21, 2014
