= Andrew Stone (soccer) =

American soccer player

Personal information
- Date of birth: November 18, 1990 (age 35)
- Place of birth: Green Bay, Wisconsin, United States
- Height: 6 ft 2 in (1.88 m)
- Position: Defender

Youth career
- 2009–2011: Green Bay Phoenix
- 2013: Milwaukee Panthers

Senior career*
Years	Team	Apps	(Gls)
2014	Indy Eleven	7	(0)
- * Club domestic league appearances and goals as of April 4, 2014

Andrew Stone (born November 18, 1990) is an American soccer player.

== Career ==
=== High school ===
Stone was born in Green Bay, Wisconsin. He attended high school at Green Bay Preble High School where he played soccer as a student athlete under head coach Chris Becker. Stone also played high school club soccer (public league soccer) for green bay lightning under head coach Aldo Santaga.

=== College ===
Andrew stone played at the University of Wisconsin-Green Bay (2009–2011). His Freshman year (2009) he appeared in all 20 regular season matches, 6 of which were starts. On September 11 Stone scored his first goal of his collegiate career. It was his only goal of the season. Stone missed the first 6 games of his sophomore season (2010) due to an emergency appendectomy. He Returned to start 13 matches that season. He also scored one goal on the season. Stone started 18 games his Junior year (2011) and scored one goal on the season. Due to NCAA transfer rules Stone was required to red shirt the 2012 season. Stone transferred to the University of Wisconsin–Milwaukee for his senior season (2013). He appeared in 19 matches that season. All of which were starts. He also scored 3 goals on the season. Stone was named the 2013 Horizon League Tournament most valuable player.

=== Indy Eleven ===
Stone made his professional debut on May 17, 2014, in a 4–2 defeat to Ottawa Fury FC.

== Career statistics ==
=== Club ===
As of May 31, 2014

Club performance			League		Cup		League Cup		Continental		Total	
Season	Club	League	Apps	Goals	Apps	Goals	Apps	Goals	Apps	Goals	Apps	Goals
US0			League		Open Cup		League Cup		North America		Total	
2014	Indy Eleven	North American Soccer League	2	0	0	0	0	0	0	0	2	0
Career total			2	0	0	0	0	0	0	0	2	0
