= Blake Smith =

American soccer player (born 1991)

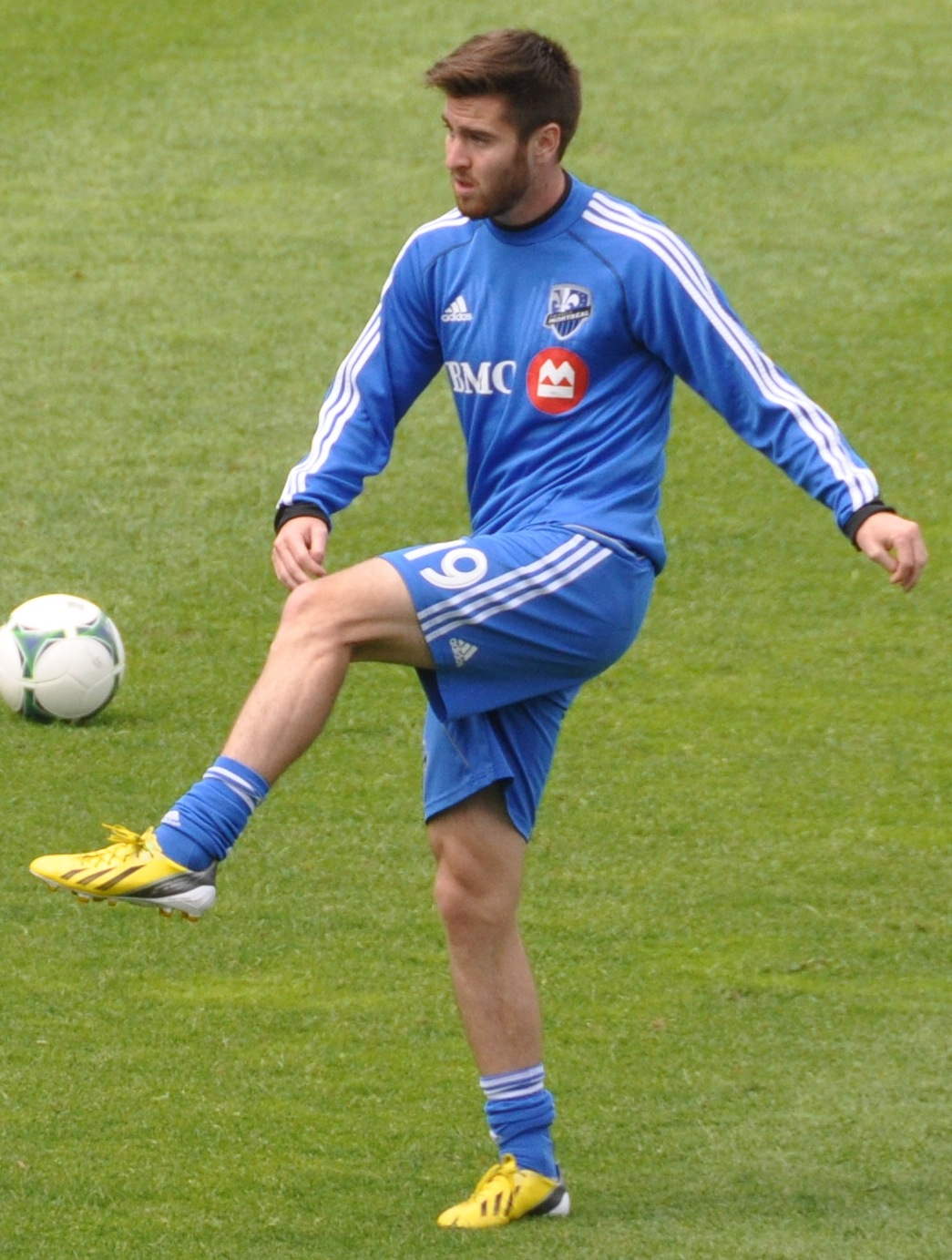
- Smith with the Montreal Impact in 2013

Personal information
- Full name: Blake Smith
- Date of birth: January 17, 1991 (age 35)
- Place of birth: Boerne, Texas, United States
- Height: 5 ft 10 in (1.78 m)
- Positions: Winger; left-back

College career
| Years | Team | Apps | (Gls) |
| 2009–2012 | New Mexico Lobos | 68 | (13) |

Senior career*
| Years | Team | Apps | (Gls) |
| 2012 | Austin Aztex | 2 | (0) |
| 2013–2015 | Montreal Impact | 25 | (2) |
| 2014 | → Indy Eleven (loan) | 19 | (6) |
| 2015 | Yverdon-Sport | 14 | (4) |
| 2016–2017 | Miami FC | 55 | (1) |
| 2018–2019 | FC Cincinnati | 30 | (1) |
| 2019 | → Pacific FC (loan) | 24 | (0) |
| 2020 | San Antonio FC | 16 | (2) |
| Total | | 185 | (16) |
- * Club domestic league appearances and goals as of October 6, 2020

Blake Smith (born January 17, 1991) is an American former professional soccer player.

== Professional career ==
=== Montreal Impact ===
On January 17, 2013, Smith was selected 8th overall in the 2013 MLS SuperDraft by the Montreal Impact. On February 25, 2013, the Impact officially signed Smith. He made his professional debut on March 30, 2013, against Sporting Kansas City, coming on as a sub in the 79th minute for Marco Di Vaio. On May 13, the Impact loaned Smith to NASL club Indy Eleven.

Smith was waived by Montreal on May 7, 2015. Smith played the remainder of 2015 with Swiss club Yverdon Sport FC before being signed on December 15, 2015, by NASL expansion club Miami FC.

=== FC Cincinnati ===
On February 5, 2018, Smith signed with United Soccer League side FC Cincinnati.

After Cincinnati moved to Major League Soccer the following season, Smith re-signed with the club on December 10, 2018. After appearing on the bench for FC Cincinnati in their MLS league debut, he was placed on waivers by the club on March 7, 2019.

==== Loan to Pacific FC ====
On April 8, 2019, Smith was loaned to Canadian Premier League side Pacific FC. Smith was part of Pacific FC in their first-ever season, as well as the first season in league history. Smith contributed with five assists, tied with five other players for the most in the league.

=== San Antonio FC ===
On December 23, 2019, Smith joined San Antonio FC, returning to his hometown as a native of nearby Boerne, Texas.

At the end of the season, Smith announced his retirement from playing professional soccer.

== Career statistics ==
As of October 19, 2019

| Club | Season | League | League | | National Cup | | Continental | | Playoffs | | Total | |
| Club | Season | League | Apps | Goals | Apps | Goals | Apps | Goals | Apps | Goals | Apps | Goals |
|---|---|---|---|---|---|---|---|---|---|---|---|---|
| Montreal Impact | 2013 | MLS | 16 | 2 | 2 | 0 | 3 | 0 | 0 | 0 | 21 | 2 |
| Montreal Impact | 2014 | MLS | 3 | 0 | 1 | 0 | – | | – | | 4 | 0 |
| Montreal Impact | 2015 | MLS | 0 | 0 | – | | – | | – | | 0 | 0 |
| Montreal Impact | Total | | 19 | 2 | 3 | 0 | 3 | 0 | 0 | 0 | 25 | 2 |
| Indy Eleven (loan) | 2014 | NASL | 19 | 2 | 2 | 4 | – | | – | | 21 | 6 |
| Miami FC | 2016 | NASL | 30 | 0 | 1 | 0 | – | | – | | 31 | 0 |
| Miami FC | 2017 | NASL | 25 | 1 | 4 | 0 | – | | 1 | 0 | 30 | 1 |
| Miami FC | Total | | 55 | 1 | 5 | 0 | 0 | 0 | 1 | 0 | 61 | 1 |
| FC Cincinnati | 2018 | USL | 30 | 1 | 3 | 0 | – | | 2 | 0 | 35 | 1 |
| FC Cincinnati | 2019 | MLS | 0 | 0 | 0 | 0 | – | | – | | 0 | 0 |
| FC Cincinnati | Total | | 30 | 1 | 3 | 0 | 0 | 0 | 2 | 0 | 35 | 1 |
| Pacific FC (loan) | 2019 | CPL | 24 | 0 | 2 | 0 | – | | – | | 26 | 0 |
| Career total | | | 147 | 6 | 15 | 4 | 3 | 0 | 3 | 0 | 168 | 10 |

== Honors ==
Montreal Impact

- Canadian Championship (2): 2013, 2014
- CONCACAF Champions League runner-up (1): 2014-15
