= Nathan Sprenkel =

American soccer player (born 1990)

Personal information
- Full name: Nathaniel Sprenkel
- Date of birth: April 18, 1990 (age 36)
- Place of birth: Zionsville, Indiana, United States
- Height: 6 ft 0 in (1.83 m)
- Position: Goalkeeper

Youth career
- 2008: Duquesne Dukes
- 2009–2011: DePauw Tigers

Senior career*
Years	Team	Apps	(Gls)
2012	Antigua Barracuda FC	1	(0)
2014	Indy Eleven	0	(0)
- * Club domestic league appearances and goals as of April 3, 2014

Nathaniel Sprenkel (born April 18, 1990) is an American soccer player.

== Career ==
=== College ===
Sprenkel played his first year in 2008 at Duquesne University in Pittsburgh, but returned to Indiana to play at DePauw University from 2009 to 2011. While with the DePauw Tigers, Sprenkel helped the squad capture the North Coast Athletic Conference tournament title. He was also named a NSCAA Second-Team All-American, and the NCAC's Defensive Player of the Year. He graduated from DePauw in 2012 with a major in Psychology and minor in Education.

=== USL PRO ===
Sprenkel signed with USL PRO side Antigua Barracuda FC and made his professional debut in a 1–0 loss against the Orange County Blues. Later in 2012 he signed a two-year contract with Chicago Soul between 2012 and 2013 before returning to in Greenscastle, Indiana to become an assistant coach for DePauw's soccer team.

=== Indy Eleven ===
The Zionsville native signed with his home team, the Indy Eleven, on November 11, 2013.

== Career statistics ==
=== Club ===
As of April 1, 2014

Club performance			League		Cup		League Cup		Continental		Total	
Season	Club	League	Apps	Goals	Apps	Goals	Apps	Goals	Apps	Goals	Apps	Goals
US			League		Open Cup		League Cup		North America		Total	
2012	Antigua Barracuda FC	USL PRO	1	0	0	0	0	0	0	0	1	0
2012-13	Chicago Soul FC	Major Indoor Soccer League	0	0	0	0	0	0	0	0	0	0
2014	Indy Eleven	North American Soccer League	0	0	0	0	0	0	0	0	0	0
Career total			1	0	0	0	0	0	0	0	1	0
