= Emiliano Bonfigli =

Argentine footballer

Personal information
- Full name: Emiliano Nicolas Bonfigli
- Date of birth: April 15, 1988 (age 38)
- Place of birth: Bahía Blanca, Argentina
- Height: 1.78 m (5 ft 10 in)
- Position: Forward

Team information
- Current team: Deportes Valdivia
- Number: 9

Youth career
- 2007–2009: Rácing Club

Senior career*
Years	Team	Apps	(Gls)
2010–2011	Almagro	39	(16)
2011	Manta	18	(1)
2012	Real Salt Lake	10	(1)
2013	San Telmo	16	(4)
2013–2014	Almagro	33	(12)
2014–2015	CA Atlanta	44	(22)
2016–2017	Zacatepec	37	(7)
2017	Tampico Madero	10	(1)
2018	Deportivo Cuenca	38	(6)
2019	Olimpia	4	(1)
2019–2020	Fénix	23	(4)
2021–	Deportes Valdivia	1	(1)
- * Club domestic league appearances and goals as of 21:24, 1 June 2021 (UTC)

Emiliano Bonfigli (born February 23, 1989) is an Argentine footballer who currently plays for Deportes Valdivia in the Segunda División Profesional de Chile.

== Career ==
=== Club ===
Bonfigli began his youth career with Tiro Federal de Bahía Blanca and in 2007 joined Rácing Club. In 2010, he joined Club Almagro in Primera B Metropolitana and was one of the league's top scorers with 16 goals. As a result of his play with Almagro he received interest from other South American clubs and in 2011 signed with top Ecuadorean club Manta FC. He is most known by Zerkaa's FIFA Ultimate Team series known as Bigbon. Bonfigli appeared in 18 league games for Manta scoring one goal.

During January 2012, Bonfigli participated in the 2012 MLS SuperDraft in hopes of getting selected by a club in Major League Soccer. On January 17, 2012, he was selected by Real Salt Lake in the 2012 MLS Supplemental Draft. Bonfigli was released by Salt Lake on December 3, 2012.
