= Corby Moore =

English footballer (born 1993)

Personal information
- Full name: Corby James Moore
- Date of birth: 21 November 1993 (age 32)
- Place of birth: Southampton, England
- Height: 1.70 m (5 ft 7 in)
- Position: Midfielder

Team information
- Current team: Dorchester Town

Youth career
- 2001–2011: Southampton

Senior career*
Years	Team	Apps	(Gls)
2011–2014	Southampton	0	(0)
2014	Indy Eleven	12	(0)
2015–2016	Forest Green Rovers	1	(0)
2015	→ Poole Town (loan)	5	(1)
2015	→ Frome Town (loan)	3	(0)
2016	Bishop's Stortford	20	(2)
2016	Chelmsford City	4	(0)
2016	Frome Town	5	(1)
2016–2023	Poole Town	215	(12)
2023–	Dorchester Town	0	(0)
- * Club domestic league appearances and goals as of 13:23, 12 September 2023 (UTC)

Corby James Moore (born 21 November 1993) is an English footballer who plays as a midfielder for Dorchester Town.

== Career ==
=== Southampton ===
After spending the entirety of his youth career at the Southampton Academy, Moore decided to sign a long term youth contract with Southampton in November 2011 and was named to Southampton's developmental squad. Moore made a singular appearance for Southampton, playing the final six minutes in a 4–1 win over Stevenage in League Cup second round tie in August 2012.

=== Indy Eleven ===
Moore joined Indy Eleven, signing a two-year deal on 11 March 2014.

=== Forest Green Rovers ===
On 4 January 2015, it was confirmed that Moore had returned to England to sign for Conference National side Forest Green Rovers. He made his debut for the club as a substitute in a 5–3 home win over Southport on 28 February 2015. On 4 May 2015, it was confirmed that he had been offered a new six-month contract for the 2015–16 season by Forest Green. On 10 June 2015, it was confirmed that Moore had signed a new six-month deal to stay at The New Lawn.

In September 2015, he joined Southern Premier Division side Poole Town on a one-month loan. He returned to Forest Green and was then immediately sent out on loan again to Poole Town's league rivals, Frome Town. On 31 December 2015, he was released at the end of his six-month contract by Forest Green.

=== Bishop's Stortford ===
In January 2016, Moore signed for National League South club Bishop's Stortford.

=== Chelmsford City ===
In July 2016, Moore signed for Chelmsford City, following former manager Rod Stringer to the club. With opportunities hard to come across, Moore only managed to play four games and on 30 September 2016, Rod Stringer announced he was released from the club.

=== Poole Town ===
Following Moore's release from Chelmsford, he re-joined former side Poole Town under Tom Killick.

=== Dorchester Town ===
On 11 September 2023, Moore was one of three Poole Town players to sign for Dorchester Town.

== Career statistics ==
As of match played 2 September 2023

Appearances and goals by club, season and competition
Club	Season	League			National Cup		League Cup		Other		Total	
Club	Season	Division	Apps	Goals	Apps	Goals	Apps	Goals	Apps	Goals	Apps	Goals
Southampton	2012–13	Premier League	0	0	0	0	1	0	0	0	1	0
Indy Eleven	2014	NASL	12	0	2	0	0	0	0	0	14	0
Forest Green Rovers	2014–15	National League	1	0	0	0	—		0	0	1	0
Forest Green Rovers	2015–16	National League	0	0	0	0	—		1 (Note: Appearance in the Gloucestershire Senior Cup)	0	1	0
Forest Green Rovers	Total		1	0	0	0	0	0	1	0	2	0
Poole Town (loan)	2015–16	SFL - Premier Division	5	1	2	0	—		1 (Note: Appearances in the Southern League Cup)	0	8	1
Frome Town (loan)	2015–16	SFL - Premier Division	3	0	—		—		3 (Note: Two appearances and a goal in the FA Trophy; one appearance in the Somerset Premier Cup)	1	6	1
Bishops Stortford	2015–16	National League South	20	2	—		—		3 (Note: Two appearances in the Hertfordshire Senior Cup and one in the Hertfordshire Charity Cup)	0	23	2
Chelmsford City	2016–17	National League South	4	0	1	0	—		0	0	5	0
Frome Town	2016–17	SFL - Premier Division	5	1	—		—		1	0	6	1
Poole Town	2016–17	National League South	22	0	—		—		1 (Note: Appearance in the Dorset Senior Cup)	0	23	0
Poole Town	2017–18	National League South	40	0	2	0	—		0	0	42	0
Poole Town	2018–19	SFL Premier Division South	39	4	5	1	—		6 (Note: Four appearances in FA Trophy and two appearances in Southern League Premier Division South play-offs)	0	50	5
Poole Town	2019–20	SFL Premier Division South	27	2	5	1	—		0	0	32	3
Poole Town	2020–21	SFL Premier Division South	7	2	0	0	—		2 (Note: Appearance(s) in EFL Trophy)	0	9	2
Poole Town	2021–22	SFL Premier Division South	37	2	3	0	—		0	0	40	2
Poole Town	2022–23	SFL Premier Division South	39	1	1	0	—		1	0	41	1
Poole Town	2023–24	SFL Premier Division South	4	1	1	0	—		0	0	5	1
Poole Town	Total		215	12	17	2	0	0	10	0	242	14
Career total			275	16	22	2	1	0	19	1	317	19
