= Kristian Nicht =

German footballer

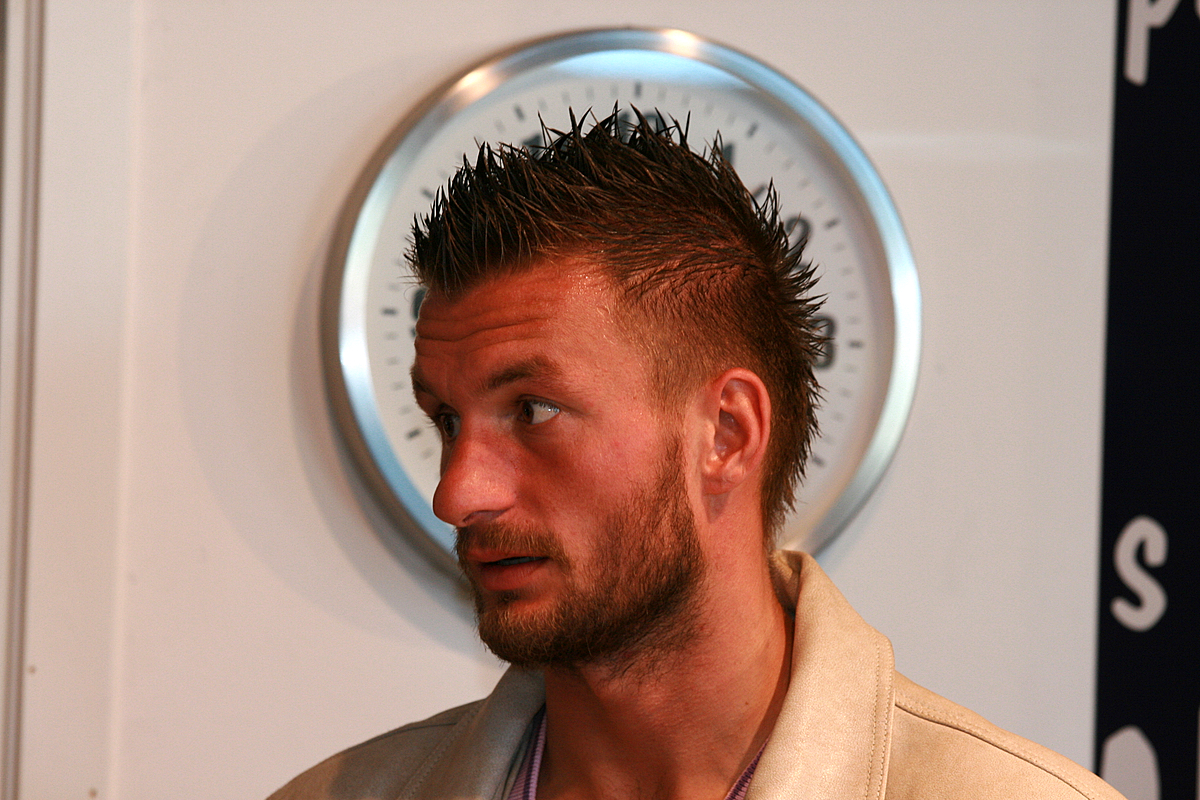
- Nicht in 2008

Personal information
- Date of birth: 3 April 1982 (age 44)
- Place of birth: Jena, East Germany
- Height: 1.96 m (6 ft 5 in)
- Position: Goalkeeper

Youth career
- 1988–2002: Carl Zeiss Jena

Senior career*
Years	Team	Apps	(Gls)
2002–2003	Stuttgart Kickers	30	(0)
2003–2004	1. FC Nürnberg	0	(0)
2004–2007	Alemannia Aachen	60	(0)
2008–2009	Viking	20	(0)
2009–2011	Karlsruher SC	14	(0)
2012–2013	Rochester Rhinos	46	(0)
2014–2015	Indy Eleven	31	(0)
2015	→ Montreal Impact (loan)	0	(0)
2015	Montreal Impact	0	(0)
2015	Indy Eleven	16	(0)
2016	Minnesota United FC	0	(0)
- * Club domestic league appearances and goals as of 09:53, 18 November 2015 (EST)

Kristian Nicht (born 3 April 1982) is a German former professional footballer who played as a goalkeeper.

== Career ==
=== Europe ===
He came through the academy system of his hometown club FC Carl Zeiss Jena. He had an unsuccessful trial with Scottish side Livingston in 2001. Nicht joined Stuttgarter Kickers of the Regionalliga Süd, Germany's then third-tier, for the 2002–03 campaign. Nicht notched six clean sheets in 30 appearances as the team's first-choice 'keeper, matches that included his first professional shutout vs. Jahn Regensburg (3 August 2002, 0–0 D) and a notable 4–2 win against Bayern Munich II, the reserve squad of the famed Bavarian club on 17 August 2002. At FC Carl Zeiss Jena, he developed a close relationship with Germany national team goalkeeper Robert Enke.

Nicht signed with 1. FC Nürnberg for the 2003–04 season and earn the starting role for the club's reserves side that competed in the Oberliga Bayern, Bavaria's regional league. A year to the day after registering his first career shutout with Stuttgarter Kickers, Nicht marked his Nürnberg debut in the same fashion, blanking Jahn Regensburg II in a 0–0 stalemate, the first of his 26 appearances during the campaign.

Following an unsuccessful trial with Scottish side Dunfermline in 2004, Nicht began a three-and-a-year stint with Alemannia Aachen from 2004 to 2007, during which he helped the squad achieve promotion out of the 2. Bundesliga and into Germany's top-flight. After starting his stint with Alemannia Aachen's reserve squad, three straight wins in the spring saw him promoted to the first team, for which he started the season's final five contests (including three wins). The 2005–06 campaign saw Nicht installed as the starter from day one, and he went on to play every minute of the team's first 31 contests that season, which he finished with 11 shutouts and a 1.10 goals against average. Nicht's fourth shutout in five games in a 1–0 away win at Eintracht Braunschweig on 7 April 2006, secured the team's promotion to the Bundesliga with five games remaining.

In the 2006–07 season, Nicht started half of the 34 matches in Aachen's return to top division after a 36-year absence and also led the squad to wins in the first and second round of the DFB-Pokal. Nicht reasserted himself in the starting lineup late in the season but not could not prevent club from relegation back to the 2. Bundesliga. Nicht recorded three shutouts in five appearances before leaving club in winter, but not before making a noteworthy send-off appearance in a 0–0 draw at TuS Koblenz on 14 December, in which he manned the goal from the 40th minute onward, replacing the red-carded starting keeper and immediately saving a penalty.

January 2008 saw Nicht transfer to Norwegian side Viking FK, for whom he plied his trade for a season-and-a-half through July 2009. He recorded a debut shutout to help his new team to a 1–0 defeat of Strømsgodset, the first of his 18 appearances (17 starts), which he compiled six shutouts and a 1.19 GAA. Viking's successful 2008 earned the club entry to the qualification round of the UEFA Cup (now Europa League) in which Nicht started and played every minute of the two-leg tie against Finnish side FC Honka. Nicht held FC Honka scoreless in away fixture to seize upper hand but surrendered two goals in 2–1 defeat in return leg at home that saw Viking exit the tournament.

Nicht returned to his homeland to suit up with Karlsruher SC of the 2. Bundesliga for the 2009–10 Regionaliga Süd season. He made five appearances for their reserve squad in Regionaliga Süd play that ensuing season, showing merit through three shutout performances and a 0.83 GAA. Nicht served as the second-string keeper for first-team until final two fixtures of the season, during which he allowed just one goal across his 180 minutes of action. The 2010–11 season saw Nicht start the season as the first-choice goalkeeper and made 12 appearances, all starts.

=== North America ===
On 6 March 2012, the Rochester Rhinos announced they had signed Nicht for the 2012 USL Pro season. To begin his first season with the club, Nicht recorded a North American record to start a season with six consecutive shutouts. He continued this strong form throughout the season recording a league leading eleven total shutouts, ranked second in USL PRO with a 0.909 goals against average and 12 wins, and fourth in the league in total saves. His play earned him the 2012 USL PRO Goalkeeper of the Year award. Additionally, he was named to the first all pro team of the USL.

On 1 October 2013, Indy Eleven of the North American Soccer League, the second tier of the United States soccer league system, announced that Nicht had been signed as the club's first-ever player.

In February 2015, Nicht joined Montreal Impact on a short-term loan, as cover for the Impact's Champions League games. On 27 April 2015, the Montreal Impact acquired Nicht by way of transfer. The move was made since the Impact were in desperate need of a goalie for the 2nd leg of the 2014–15 CONCACAF Champions League finals after losing Evan Bush to a suspension and having Eric Kronberg already cup tied with Sporting Kansas City. He made his debut on 29 April 2015, on the 2nd leg of 2014–15 CONCACAF Champions League Final, against Club América. He was released by the club just five days later on 4 May 2015. On 12 May 2015, he signed a contract to re-join Indy Eleven.

Nicht signed with Minnesota United FC on 5 February 2016.

== Personal life ==
In November 2015, Nicht received his U.S. green card.

== Honours ==
=== Individual ===
- USL Pro Goalkeeper of the Year: 2012
- USL Pro All League First Team: 2012
- USL Pro Shutout Leader (11): 2012
- USL Pro Player of the Week (6): 15 May 2012
