= Charlie Rugg =

American soccer player (born 1990)

Personal information
- Full name: Charles Nosike Rugg
- Date of birth: October 2, 1990 (age 36)
- Place of birth: Roslindale, Massachusetts, United States
- Height: 6 ft 0 in (1.83 m)
- Position: Forward

College career
Years	Team	Apps	(Gls)
2009–2012	Boston College Eagles	76	(28)

Senior career*
Years	Team	Apps	(Gls)
2011	GPS Portland Phoenix	10	(4)
2012	Worcester Hydra	5	(2)
2013–2015	LA Galaxy	4	(1)
2014	→ LA Galaxy II (loan)	25	(8)
2014	→ Indy Eleven (loan)	5	(1)
2015	→ Indy Eleven (loan)	19	(0)
2016	Eintracht Trier	12	(5)
2016–2017	Pirmasens	32	(4)

Managerial career
- 2020–2024: Boston College Eagles (player development)
- * Club domestic league appearances and goals as of May 29, 2017

Charles Nosike Rugg (born October 2, 1990) is an American former professional soccer player who played as a forward.

== Career ==
=== Professional ===
Los Angeles Galaxy selected Rugg in the first round (No. 19 overall) of the 2013 MLS SuperDraft. Rugg made his debut for Galaxy on April 27, 2013, against Real Salt Lake and also scored his first professional goal in the 13th minute.

On March 22, 2014, Rugg was sent down to the LA Galaxy II, the reserve side of the Galaxy, and played in the sides first USL Pro match against the Orange County Blues. He started the match and scored the first goal in Galaxy II history in the 40th minute.

Rugg was loaned to Indy Eleven for the rest of the NASL season on October 1, 2014. He made his debut on October 4, 2014, against the New York Cosmos and scored his first goal against San Antonio Scorpions on October 18, 2014. His game-winning goal against San Antonio Scorpions earned him Play of the Week honors. Over the course of his loan, he started and played 90 minutes in all five games he was available for, with the team getting three wins and two draws in those matches.

On March 18, 2015, Rugg rejoined Indy Eleven on a season-long loan.

Rugg's MLS contract was not renewed by the LA Galaxy following the 2015 season

He signed with Eintracht Trier in February 2016 and scored twice in his debut against FC Homburg.
