= Jaime Frías =

American-born Mexican footballer (born 1993)

Personal information
- Full name: Jaime Jr. Frías Flores
- Date of birth: 18 February 1993 (age 33)
- Place of birth: Los Angeles, California, United States
- Height: 1.82 m (6 ft 0 in)
- Position: Centre back

Youth career
- 2008–2013: Guadalajara

Senior career*
Years	Team	Apps	(Gls)
2013	Guadalajara C	1	(0)
2013	Chivas Rayadas	2	(0)
2013–2016	Guadalajara	0	(0)
2013	→ Chivas USA (loan)	4	(0)
2014–2015	→ Indy Eleven (loan)	37	(2)
2016	Guadalajara Premier	11	(0)
2016–2017	Pioneros de Cancún	24	(3)
2018–2019	Atlético San Luis	0	(0)
2019–2020	Alacranes de Durango	22	(0)
2020–2022	Furia Roja	0	(0)
- * Club domestic league appearances and goals as of 24 January 2020

Jaime Jr. Frías Flores (born 8 February 1993) is an American-born Mexican footballer who is currently plays as a defender in Alacranes de Durango, on loan from Atlético San Luis.

== Career ==
After several years playing for Guadalajara's youth and reserve teams, Frías joined Chivas USA on loan on July 18, 2013.

After spending the entire 2014 preseason training with Indy Eleven, Frias joined the Indianapolis-based NASL side for a season-long loan on April 8, 2014. After a successful season in Indy Eleven, he returned to Guadalajara to compete for a chance to play for the first team by playing in the club's third division side, Guadalajara Premier.
