= A. J. Corrado =

American soccer player (born 1992)

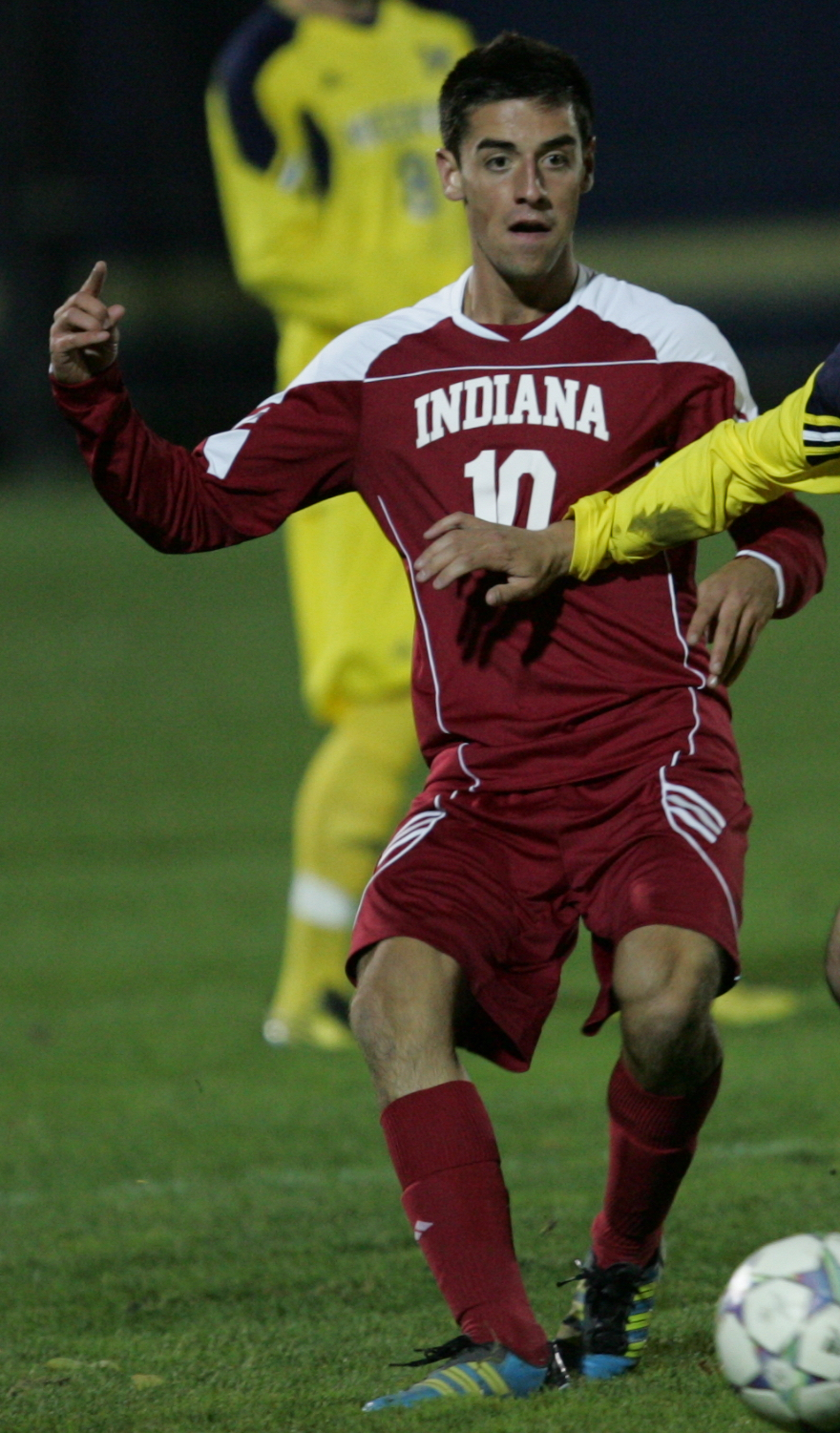

Personal information
- Full name: Andrew Jordan Corrado
- Date of birth: January 8, 1992 (age 34)
- Place of birth: Zionsville, Indiana, U.S.
- Height: 1.77 m (5 ft 10 in)
- Position: Midfielder

Youth career
- 2010: SMU Mustangs
- 2011–2013: Indiana Hoosiers

Senior career*
| Years | Team | Apps | (Gls) |
| 2014 | Indy Eleven | 14 | (0) |
- * Club domestic league appearances and goals as of November 23, 2014

Andrew Jordan "A. J." Corrado (born January 8, 1992) is an American former professional soccer player who played as a midfielder.

== Career ==
=== Early career ===
In high school, Corrado was named the 2010 Indiana High School Gatorade Player of the Year as well as an ESPN Rise First Team All-American after notching 24 goals and 25 assists as his team won the IHSAA State Championship in his senior season.

Corrado started his college soccer in 2010 at Southern Methodist University before transferring to Indiana University in 2011. While at Indiana University, he helped lead the Hoosiers to the 2012 NCAA National Championship with a team-leading 12 assists. That same year Corrado was chosen as a First Team All-Big Ten selection. His Senior year he was named a Capital One Academic All-American and a Senior CLASS Award finalist.

=== Professional ===
On January 16, 2014, it was announced that Corrado had been drafted by San Jose Earthquakes of Major League Soccer in the third-round (47th overall) of the 2014 MLS SuperDraft. However, Corrado didn't earn a contract with San Jose.

On April 8, 2014, Corrado signed with NASL club Indy Eleven.
