= Cory Miller =

American soccer player (born 1988)

Personal information
- Full name: Cory Miller
- Date of birth: July 22, 1988 (age 38)
- Place of birth: Chicago, Illinois, U.S.
- Height: 6 ft 2 in (1.88 m)
- Position: Defender

College career
| Years | Team | Apps | (Gls) |
| 2006–2009 | Olivet Nazarene Tigers | | |

Senior career*
| Years | Team | Apps | (Gls) |
| 2009 | Atlanta Blackhawks | 1 | (0) |
| 2010 | DFW Tornados | 8 | (0) |
| 2011 | Carolina RailHawks | 10 | (0) |
| 2012–2013 | Los Angeles Blues | 42 | (1) |
| 2014–2017 | Indy Eleven | 54 | (1) |
| 2018 | Detroit City FC | 0 | (0) |
- * Club domestic league appearances and goals as of 30 October 2017

Cory Miller (born July 22, 1988) is an American soccer player.

== Career ==
=== College and amateur ===
Miller was an all-conference centerback at Olivet Nazarene University in Bourbonnais, Illinois from 2006 to 2009. During his senior season in 2009, he led ONU to the Chicagoland Collegiate Athletic Conference championship and the NAIA national tournament – both program firsts. He was a two-time NAIA Scholar-Athlete and CCAC All-First Team and CCAC All-Academic Team in 2009.

During his college years he also played with the Atlanta Blackhawks and the DFW Tornados in the USL Premier Development League.

=== Professional ===
Miller was invited to try out with the Portland Timbers prior to their inaugural season in Major League Soccer in 2011, but was not offered a contract by the team.

Miller signed his first professional contract in 2011 when he joined Carolina RailHawks of the North American Soccer League. He made his professional debut on April 9 in a game against Puerto Rico Islanders. On August 28, 2014, Miller was signed by Indy Eleven of the North American Soccer League.

For the 2018 season he was on the roster at Detroit City FC.
