= Marco Franco =

American soccer player

Personal information
- Date of birth: 6 October 1991 (age 35)
- Place of birth: Chino Hills, California, United States
- Height: 1.80 m (5 ft 11 in)
- Position: Defender

Youth career
- 2010–2013: UC Irvine Anteaters

Senior career*
Years	Team	Apps	(Gls)
2012	Orange County Blue Star	10	(0)
2013	OC Blues Strikers FC	5	(0)
2014	Chicago Fire	0	(0)
2014	→ Orange County Blues (loan)	4	(0)
2014	→ Indy Eleven (loan)	6	(0)
2015–2017	Indy Eleven	82	(0)
2018	Penn FC	26	(0)
2019–2020	Miami FC	27	(0)
- * Club domestic league appearances and goals as of October 4, 2020

Marco Franco (born October 6, 1991) is an American soccer player who plays as a defender.

== Career ==
=== Youth and college ===
Franco played four years of college soccer at UC Irvine between 2010 and 2013. While at college, Franco also appeared for USL PDL club's Orange County Blue Star and OC Blues Strikers FC in 2012 and 2013 respectively.

=== Professional ===
On January 16, 2014, Franco was selected 13th overall in the 2014 MLS SuperDraft by Chicago Fire.

Franco was loaned to USL Pro club Orange County Blues on August 8, 2014.

In September 2014, Franco joined NASL side Indy Eleven on loan.
