= Victor Pineda (soccer) =

American soccer player

Personal information
- Full name: Victor Pineda
- Date of birth: March 15, 1993 (age 33)
- Place of birth: Bolingbrook, Illinois, United States
- Height: 5 ft 11 in (1.80 m)
- Position: Midfielder

Youth career
- 2008–2009: IMG Soccer Academy
- 2009–2010: Chicago Fire

Senior career*
Years	Team	Apps	(Gls)
2010–2014	Chicago Fire	4	(0)
2014	→ Indy Eleven (loan)	17	(3)
2015	Indy Eleven	20	(2)
2016	Fort Lauderdale Strikers	20	(0)
2017	Orange County SC	28	(2)

International career^{‡}
2008–2009	United States U17	2	(0)
2010–2011	United States U18	10	(2)
2012–2013	United States U20	10	(3)
2014	United States U23	1	(0)
- * Club domestic league appearances and goals as of October 20, 2017 ‡ National team caps and goals as of August 16, 2014

Victor Pineda (born March 15, 1993) is an American former professional soccer player who played as a midfielder.

== Career ==
=== Professional ===
The first homegrown player in Chicago Fire history, Pineda signed with the first team in August 2010. That year the midfielder lead the Chicago Fire U-16 Academy with eight goals and helped his team win the U.S. Soccer Federation Development Academy National Championship (in which he scored the first penalty kick of the penalty kick shootout). He was subsequently called up to the United States U-18 national team and scored twice during the international tournaments. On February 17, 2012, Pineda was selected to the national U-20 team as one of the two team leaders.

Pineda made his MLS debut on March 23, 2014, in a match against New York Red Bulls.

On June 13, 2014, Pineda moved to NASL team Indy Eleven on loan. He signed with Indy for the 2015 season after he was released by Chicago.

In December 2015, Pineda signed with Fort Lauderdale Strikers.

=== Personal ===
His brother, Mauricio, signed with the Fire in early 2020 after playing several years of college soccer.
