= 2018 Indy Eleven season =

Indy Eleven
2018 season
- Owner: Ersal Ozdemir
- Head coach: Martin Rennie
- United Soccer League: Eastern Conference: 7th
- USL Playoffs: Conference Quarterfinals (knocked out by Louisville City)
- U.S. Open Cup: Second round (knocked out by Mississippi Brilla)
- Top goalscorer: League: Jack McInerney (10); All: Jack McInerney (10)
- Highest home attendance: 17,535 (March 31 vs. Cincinnati)
- Lowest home attendance: 8,070 (May 30 vs. Charleston)
- Average home league attendance: 10,163
Home colors	Away colors

The 2018 Indy Eleven season was the club's fifth season of existence, and their first season in the United Soccer League following their move from the North American Soccer League on January 10. Indy also competed in the U.S. Open Cup. The season covered the period from October 30, 2017, to the beginning of the 2019 USL season.

2018 marked a number of firsts for the club: the first year that home matches were played in Lucas Oil Stadium, located in downtown Indianapolis, as well as the first year of Martin Rennie's managerial tenure. Although Rennie was victorious in his first game in charge of the club, Indy were defeated in their first-ever match at their new home stadium. The season average of 10,163 fans per home match was the second-largest average attendance in Indy Eleven history, behind only the club's inaugural season.

The Eleven qualified for the USL playoffs in their first season in the league, finishing with 49 points and earning the 7th seed in the Eastern Conference. However, they were eliminated in the conference quarterfinals by Louisville City, who went on to win USL Cup for the second consecutive season. In the U.S. Open Cup, Indy was eliminated in the second round by fourth-tier Mississippi Brilla, marking the second consecutive season that the club was knocked out by a Premier Development League opponent.

== Roster ==
As of match played October 20, 2018

No.	Name	Nationality	Position(s)	Date of birth (age)	Signed in	Previous club	Apps.	Goals
Goalkeepers
0	Ben Lundgaard	(United States)	GK	September 25, 1995 (age 30)	2018	(United States) Columbus Crew SC (loan)	0	0
1	Owain Fôn Williams	(Wales)	GK	March 17, 1987 (age 39)	2018	(Scotland) Inverness Caledonian Thistle (loan)	36	0
25	Jordan Farr	(United States)	GK	October 5, 1994 (age 31)	2018	(United States) Corban Warriors	0	0
Defenders
3	Tyler Pasher	(Canada)	DF	April 27, 1994 (age 32)	2018	(United States) Sporting Kansas City	10	1
5	Reiner Ferreira	(Brazil)	DF	November 17, 1985 (age 40)	2018	(United States) San Francisco Deltas	17	1
7	Ayoze	(Spain)	DF	November 22, 1985 (age 40)	2018	(United States) New York Cosmos	30	4
19	Carlyle Mitchell	(Trinidad and Tobago)	DF	August 8, 1987 (age 39)	2018	(Trinidad and Tobago) Central	32	2
20	Karl Ouimette	(Canada)	DF	June 18, 1992 (age 34)	2018	(United States) San Francisco Deltas	33	3
21	Brad Rusin	(United States)	DF	September 5, 1986 (age 40)	2018	(United States) Miami FC	12	0
22	Kevin Venegas	(United States)	DF	July 29, 1989 (age 37)	2018	(United States) Minnesota United FC	22	1
Midfielders
2	Dylan Mares	(United States)	MF	February 11, 1992 (age 34)	2018	(United States) Miami FC 2	92	13
4	Brad Ring	(United States)	MF	April 7, 1987 (age 39)	2014	(United States) Portland Timbers	115	4
6	Nico Matern	(Germany)	MF	November 27, 1992 (age 33)	2018	(United States) Indiana Wesleyan Wildcats	28	0
8	Matt Watson	(England)	MF	January 1, 1985 (age 41)	2018	(United States) Phoenix Rising	31	1
10	Ben Speas	(United States)	MF	January 17, 1991 (age 35)	2017	(United States) Minnesota United	52	7
12	Amass Amankona	(Ghana)	MF	August 2, 1995 (age 31)	2018	(United States) Dayton Dutch Lions	1	0
16	Juan Guerra	(Venezuela)	MF	February 16, 1987 (age 39)	2018	(United States) New York Cosmos	26	1
18	Seth Moses	(United States)	MF	August 2, 1993 (age 33)	2018	Puerto Rico FC	22	0
23	Zach Steinberger	(United States)	MF	May 10, 1992 (age 34)	2018	(United States) Jacksonville Armada	30	3
27	Nathan Lewis	(Trinidad and Tobago)	MF	July 20, 1990 (age 36)	2018	(Trinidad and Tobago) Central	11	0
	Diego Campos	(Costa Rica)	MF	October 1, 1995 (age 30)	2018	(United States) Chicago Fire (loan)	0	0
Forwards
9	Eugene Starikov	(United States)	FW	November 17, 1988 (age 37)	2018	(United States) New York Cosmos	19	6
14	Soony Saad	(Lebanon)	FW	August 17, 1992 (age 34)	2018	(United States) Sporting Kansas City	30	5
17	Justin Braun	(United States)	FW	March 31, 1987 (age 39)	2016	(United States) Sacramento Republic	64	19
28	Elliot Collier	(New Zealand)	FW	February 22, 1995 (age 31)	2018	(United States) Chicago Fire (loan)	11	1
99	Jack McInerney	(United States)	FW	August 5, 1992 (age 34)	2018	(United States) LA Galaxy	32	10

=== Staff ===
- (Scotland) Martin Rennie – Head Coach
- (Canada) Phillip Dos Santos – Assistant Coach
- (United States) David Dixon – Assistant Coach
- (England) Andy Swift – Goalkeeper Coach

== Preseason ==
Indy Eleven played a seven-match preseason schedule ahead of the season, featuring four matches against fellow professional clubs, two games against collegiate teams, and one game against an independent club. Although five of the seven matches were officially home matches for Indy, none of them were played at Lucas Oil Stadium; instead, they were played at different sites around the Indianapolis metropolitan area.

February 22 Friendly	Indy Eleven	1–2	FC Cincinnati	Westfield, IN
1:30 PM EST	Ring (yellow card) 37'; (yellow card) 54'; Saad 65' (pen.)	Report	Ledesma 50' (pen.); Haber 67'; König (yellow card) 72'	Stadium: Grand Park Events Center
Note: Match played with three periods of 30 minutes each

February 28 Friendly	Indy Eleven	2–0	Swope Park Rangers	Westfield, IN
1:30 PM EST	Starikov 5' (pen.), 44'; Reiner (yellow card) 89'	Report		Stadium: Grand Park Events Center

March 3 Friendly	Indy Eleven	3–1	Notre Dame Fighting Irish	Indianapolis, IN
2:30 PM EST	Dumas 7' (o.g.); Trialist 60'; Venegas (yellow card) 81'; McInerney 90' (pen.)	Report	39'; (yellow card) 56'; (yellow card) 86'	Stadium: Bud and Jackie Sellick Bowl

March 10 Friendly	Bridges FC	0–0	Indy Eleven	Chicago, IL
2:00 PM EST		Report

March 11 Friendly	Chicago Fire	0–2	Indy Eleven	Bridgeview, IL
12:00 PM EDT		Report	Saad 11'; Starikov 18'	Stadium: Toyota Park

March 17 Friendly	Indy Eleven	0–0	Jacksonville Armada	Indianapolis, IN
11:00 AM EDT	Watson (yellow card) 67'	Report	(yellow card) 63'; Yuma (yellow card) 71'	Stadium: Key Stadium

March 17 Friendly	Indy Eleven	7–0	Indiana Wesleyan Wildcats	Indianapolis, IN
1:30 PM EDT	Ring; Braun; Lewis; Trialist; Guerra	Report		Stadium: Key Stadium

== Competitions ==
=== USL ===
==== Standings ====
Pos	Team	Pld	W	D	L	GF	GA	GD	Pts	Qualification
5	New York Red Bulls II	34	13	13	8	71	59	+12	52	Conference Playoffs
6	Bethlehem Steel FC	34	14	8	12	56	41	+15	50	Conference Playoffs
7	Indy Eleven	34	13	10	11	45	42	+3	49	Conference Playoffs
8	Nashville SC	34	12	13	9	42	31	+11	49	Conference Playoffs
9	North Carolina FC	34	13	8	13	60	50	+10	47	

Source: 2018 USL standings
Rules for classification: 1) total wins; 2) total goal differential; 3) total goals scored; 4) points earned against top four Conference finishers; 5) disciplinary points; 6) coin toss or drawing of lots

==== Results summary ====
Overall								Home						Away					
Pld	W	D	L	GF	GA	GD	Pts	W	D	L	GF	GA	GD	W	D	L	GF	GA	GD
34	13	10	11	45	42	+3	49	8	5	4	29	21	+8	5	5	7	16	21	−5

Source: USL standings

==== Results by round ====
Round	1	2	3	4	5	6	7	8	9	10	11	12	13	14	15	16	17	18	19	20	21	22	23	24	25	26	27	28	29	30	31	32	33	34
Stadium	A	H	A	H	A	H	H	A	H	A	H	H	A	A	H	H	H	A	A	A	A	H	A	H	A	H	H	H	A	A	H	A	H	A
Result	W	L	W	W	D	L	W	D	L	L	D	W	W	W	D	L	W	L	L	W	D	W	D	W	D	D	D	W	L	L	W	L	D	L

Source: Indy schedule
A = Away; H = Home; W = Win; D = Draw; L = Loss

==== Match results ====
In August 2017, the USL announced that the 2018 season would span 34 games, the longest regular season the league had ever run. The expansion was spurred by the addition of six new clubs for the 2018 season: alongside Indy, the league also welcomed in Atlanta United 2, Fresno FC, Las Vegas Lights, Nashville SC, and North Carolina FC.

On January 12, 2018, the league announced home openers for every club. Indy began the season on the road, facing off against Richmond Kickers on March 24. The Eleven opened their home slate a week later, welcoming FC Cincinnati to Lucas Oil Stadium for the first match at the stadium in club history.

The schedule for the remainder of the 2018 season was released by the club on February 6. Indy played three times against four different clubs: FC Cincinnati, Louisville City, Pittsburgh Riverhounds SC, and Bethlehem Steel FC. They faced every other Eastern Conference team twice.

March 24 1	Richmond Kickers	0–1	Indy Eleven	Richmond, VA
5:00 PM EDT	Sekyere (yellow card) 88', (red card) 90+5'	Report	McInerney 41'; Matern (yellow card) 60'; Steinberger (yellow card) 68'; Reiner (yellow card) 90+6'	Stadium: City Stadium; Attendance: 4,756; Referee: Matthew Franz

March 31 2	Indy Eleven	0–1	FC Cincinnati	Indianapolis, IN
7:00 PM EDT	Reiner (yellow card) 41'; McInerney (yellow card) 45+4'	Report	Welshman 26'; Keinan (yellow card) 54'; Lasso (yellow card) 74'	Stadium: Lucas Oil Stadium; Attendance: 17,535; Referee: Malik Badawi

April 7 3	North Carolina FC	0–1	Indy Eleven	Cary, NC
7:00 PM EDT	Kandziora (yellow card) 36'; Smith (yellow card) 54'; Bekker (yellow card) 77'; Guillen (red card) 90+4'	Report	Pasher 15'; Mitchell (yellow card) 37'; Fôn Williams (yellow card) 70'; Ouimette (red card) 90+4'	Stadium: WakeMed Soccer Park; Attendance: 3,169; Referee: Kevin Broadley

April 14 4	Indy Eleven	2–1	Nashville SC	Indianapolis, IN
12:00 PM EDT	Saad 15', 34'; Ayoze (yellow card) 70'	Report	Akinyode (yellow card) 26'; Doyle (yellow card) 37'; Mensah 45'	Stadium: Lucas Oil Stadium; Attendance: 10,188; Referee: Rosendo Mendoza

April 28 5	Charlotte Independence	0–0	Indy Eleven	Charlotte, NC
7:00 PM EDT	George (yellow card) 15'; Cato (yellow card) 83'	Report	Ayoze (yellow card) 32'; McInerney (yellow card) 72'	Stadium: Sportsplex at Matthews; Attendance: 1,702; Referee: Guido Gonzalez Jr.

May 2 6	Indy Eleven	2–3	FC Cincinnati	Indianapolis, IN
7:00 PM EDT	McInerney 24'; Ayoze 30' (pen.), (yellow card) 88'	Report	Walker 7' (pen.), (yellow card) 75'; McLaughlin 41'; Bone 54'; Lasso (yellow card) 60'; Welshman (yellow card) 72'	Stadium: Lucas Oil Stadium; Attendance: 8,079; Referee: Marcos de Oliveira

May 5 7	Indy Eleven	1–0	Louisville City	Indianapolis, IN
12:00 PM EDT	McInerney (yellow card) 67'; Ayoze 78' (pen.), (yellow card) 79'; Braun (yellow card) 90+2'; Fôn Williams (yellow card) 90+7'	Report	DelPiccolo (yellow card) 36'; Craig (yellow card) 77'; Ownby (yellow card) 90+2'	Stadium: Lucas Oil Stadium; Attendance: 9,008; Referee: Jon Freemon

May 11 8	Pittsburgh Riverhounds SC	0–0	Indy Eleven	Pittsburgh, PA
7:00 PM EDT		Report	Ring (yellow card) 77'	Stadium: Highmark Stadium; Attendance: 3,123; Referee: Eric Tattersall

May 19 9	Indy Eleven	1–2	Bethlehem Steel FC	Indianapolis, IN
8:00 PM EDT	Mitchell (yellow card) 41'; Steinberger 71'	Report	Aubrey (yellow card) 16'; Moar 60'; Chiluya 75'; Jones (yellow card) 84'	Stadium: Lucas Oil Stadium; Attendance: 9,384; Referee: Elvis Osmanovic

May 26 10	New York Red Bulls II	4–1	Indy Eleven	Harrison, NJ
1:00 PM EDT	White 57'; Rivas 60' (pen.); Lade (yellow card) 73'; Moreno (yellow card) 75', (goal) 83'; Barlow 90+3'	Report	Saad 21'; Ring (yellow card) 30'; Rusin (yellow card) 59'; McInerney (yellow card) 65'; Matern (yellow card) 71' (yellow-red card) 73'	Stadium: Red Bull Arena; Attendance: 498; Referee: Mark Allatin

May 30 11	Indy Eleven	3–3	Charleston Battery	Indianapolis, IN
7:00 PM EDT	Ring (yellow card) 25'; Saad 43'; Mitchell (yellow card) 67'; McInerney (yellow card) 78'; Ayoze 86' (pen.), 90+3'	Report	van Schaik (yellow card) 19'; Anunga (yellow card) 43', (goal) 90+4'; Woodbine 62'; Guerra 80'; Candela (yellow card) 80'; Thomas (yellow card) 85'	Stadium: Lucas Oil Stadium; Attendance: 8,070; Referee: Luis Guardia

June 9 12	Indy Eleven	2–0	Atlanta United 2	Indianapolis, IN
7:00 PM EDT	Watson 30'; Mitchell 55'; Guerra (yellow card) 78'	Report		Stadium: Lucas Oil Stadium; Attendance: 10,034; Referee: Michael Radchuk

June 16 13	Toronto FC II	1–3	Indy Eleven	Rochester, NY
7:00 PM EDT	Akinola 28'; Boskovic (yellow card) 73'; Miño (yellow card) 76'	Report	Venegas 23'; Braun 45', 49'	Stadium: Marina Auto Stadium; Attendance: 1,242; Referee: Sergii Demianchuk

June 26 14	Nashville SC	0–2	Indy Eleven	Nashville, TN
8:30 PM EDT		Report	Ouimette 16'; Braun 35'; Ayoze (yellow card) 90'	Stadium: First Tennessee Park; Attendance: 8,482; Referee: Ismir Pekmic

June 30 15	Indy Eleven	1–1	Penn FC	Indianapolis, IN
7:00 PM EDT	Watson (yellow card) 41'; Ouimette (yellow card) 50' (yellow-red card) 76'; McInerney 80'; Rusin (yellow card) 90'	Report	Mkosana 51' (pen.); Metzger (yellow card) 71'	Stadium: Lucas Oil Stadium; Attendance: 10,222; Referee: Greg Dopka

July 4 16	Indy Eleven	0–1	Ottawa Fury FC	Indianapolis, IN
7:00 PM EDT	Guerra (yellow card) 26'	Report	Haworth (yellow card) 9'; Reid (yellow card) 20'; Mitchell 28' (o.g.); Edward (yellow card) 69'; Obasi (yellow card) 79'	Stadium: Lucas Oil Stadium; Attendance: 11,025; Referee: Kevin Broadley

July 7 17	Indy Eleven	2–1	Charlotte Independence	Indianapolis, IN
7:00 PM EDT	Speas 62'; Mitchell 70'	Report	Duckett (yellow card) 49' (yellow-red card) 77'; Herrera 50', (yellow card) 55'; Areman (yellow card) 90+2'; Martínez (yellow card) 90+3'	Stadium: Lucas Oil Stadium; Attendance: 9,858; Referee: Lukasz Szpala

July 11 18	Charleston Battery	2–1	Indy Eleven	Charleston, SC
7:00 PM EDT	Wild 22', 84'	Report	Starikov 58'	Stadium: MUSC Health Stadium; Attendance: 2,094; Referee: Marcos de Oliveira

July 21 19	Tampa Bay Rowdies	3–1	Indy Eleven	St. Petersburg, FL
7:30 PM EDT	Bonomo 12', (yellow card) 54'; Hristov 19', (yellow card) 29'; Cole (yellow card) 62'; Flemmings 89'	Report	Starikov 20'; Venegas (yellow card) 39'; Matern (yellow card) 49'; Ring (yellow card) 90+2'	Stadium: Al Lang Stadium; Attendance: 5,378; Referee: Matthew Miscannon

July 26 20	Bethlehem Steel FC	0–1	Indy Eleven	Bethlehem, PA
11:00 AM EDT		Report	Guerra (yellow card) 8'; Reiner (yellow card) 43'; Starikov (yellow card) 72'; McInerney 86'	Stadium: Goodman Stadium; Attendance: 2,150; Referee: Nickrod Fateh

August 5 21	Louisville City	2–2	Indy Eleven	Louisville, KY
5:00 PM EDT	Ilić 17'; Jimenez (yellow card) 44'; Davis 59'; Ownby (yellow card) 90+2'	Report	McInerney 16', 21'; Ouimette (yellow card) 40'; Starikov (yellow card) 74'	Stadium: Louisville Slugger Field; Attendance: 8,437; Referee: Elvis Osmanovic

August 15 22	Indy Eleven	3–2	North Carolina FC	Indianapolis, IN
7:00 PM EDT	Starikov 7'; Speas 31'; Mitchell (yellow card) 45'; Guerra 90'	Report	Bekker 45+1'; Lomis 77'	Stadium: Lucas Oil Stadium; Attendance: 9,023; Referee: Rubiel Vazquez

August 18 23	Ottawa Fury FC	0–0	Indy Eleven	Ottawa, ON
2:00 PM EDT		Report	Ayoze (yellow card) 85'	Stadium: TD Place Stadium; Attendance: 5,393; Referee: Yusri Rudolf

August 22 24	Indy Eleven	3–2	Toronto FC II	Indianapolis, IN
7:00 PM EDT	Speas 18'; McInerney 24'; Mares 58'; Watson (yellow card) 88'	Report	Endoh 29'; Hamilton 34'	Stadium: Lucas Oil Stadium; Attendance: 8,209; Referee: Thomas Snyder

August 25 25	Atlanta United 2	1–1	Indy Eleven	Lawrenceville, GA
7:00 PM EDT	Kissiedou (yellow card) 29'; Gaither 90+6'	Report	Moses (yellow card) 45+1'; Ouimette 53'; Ring (yellow card) 69'	Stadium: Coolray Field; Attendance: 3,008; Referee: Greg Dopka

August 29 26	Indy Eleven	2–2	Pittsburgh Riverhounds SC	Indianapolis, IN
7:00 PM EDT	McInerney 4', 90+4', (yellow card) 90+5'	Report	Greenspan 45+2'; François 59'; Lee (red card) 86'	Stadium: Lucas Oil Stadium; Attendance: 8,077; Referee: Malik Badawi

September 1 27	Indy Eleven	1–1	Richmond Kickers	Indianapolis, IN
7:00 PM EDT	Mares 14'; Reiner (yellow card) 81'	Report	Gonzalez 5', (yellow card) 69'; Williams (yellow card) 82'; Agyemang (yellow card) 90+3'	Stadium: Lucas Oil Stadium; Attendance: 11,344; Referee: Victor Rivas

September 5 28	Indy Eleven	3–0	New York Red Bulls II	Indianapolis, IN
7:00 PM EDT	Starikov 2', 21'; Matern (yellow card) 5'; Mitchell (yellow card) 38'; Reiner 43'; Watson (yellow card) 62'	Report	Abang (yellow card) 53'	Stadium: Lucas Oil Stadium; Attendance: 8,703; Referee: Jon Freemon

September 12 29	Penn FC	1–0	Indy Eleven	Harrisburg, PA
6:30 PM EDT	Tiago (yellow card) 22'; Paulo Jr. 57'; Dennis (yellow card) 72'	Report	McInerney (yellow card) 40'; Rusin (yellow card) 87'	Stadium: FNB Field; Attendance: 1,200; Referee: Ismir Pekmic

September 22 30	Pittsburgh Riverhounds SC	3–2	Indy Eleven	Pittsburgh, PA
7:00 PM EDT	Zemanski 49'; Brett 51'; Forbes 90' (pen.)	Report	McInerney 81'; Greenspan 90+2' (o.g.); Venegas (yellow card) 90+4'	Stadium: Highmark Stadium; Attendance: 2,454; Referee: Kevin Broadley

September 26 31	Indy Eleven	2–0	Tampa Bay Rowdies	Indianapolis, IN
7:00 PM EDT	Ouimette 37'; Fôn Williams (yellow card) 74'; Collier 75'	Report		Stadium: Lucas Oil Stadium; Attendance: 9,123; Referee: Daniel Radford

September 29 32	FC Cincinnati	3–0	Indy Eleven	Cincinnati, OH
7:30 PM EDT	König (yellow card) 31', (goal) 65'; Adi 34'; Mitchell 74' (o.g.)	Report	Matern (yellow card) 31'	Stadium: Nippert Stadium; Attendance: 31,478; Referee: Tim Ford

October 6 33	Indy Eleven	1–1	Bethlehem Steel FC	Indianapolis, IN
7:00 PM EDT	Moses (yellow card) 58'; Starikov 61'	Report	Faris 39'; Fontana (yellow card) 74'; Chambers (yellow card) 87'	Stadium: Lucas Oil Stadium; Attendance: 14,894; Referee: Ramy Touchan

October 13 34	Louisville City	1–0	Indy Eleven	Louisville, KY
7:30 PM EDT	DelPiccolo (yellow card) 25'; Souahy (yellow card) 31'; Lancaster 34' (pen.)	Report	Ouimette (yellow card) 51'; Moses (yellow card) 78'; Mares (yellow card) 82'	Stadium: Louisville Slugger Field; Attendance: 10,686; Referee: Greg Dopka

=== Postseason ===
October 20 Quarterfinal	Louisville City	4–1	Indy Eleven	Louisville, KY
7:30 PM EDT	McCabe 29', 48', (yellow card) 66'; Ilić 42'; Lancaster 73'	Report	Mitchell (yellow card) 46'; Saad 67'; Ouimette (yellow card) 72'	Stadium: Louisville Slugger Field; Referee: Mark Allatin

=== U.S. Open Cup ===
May 16 Second round	Mississippi Brilla	1–0	Indy Eleven	Clinton, MS
6:00 PM EDT	Bourrier (yellow card) 36'; Palmer (yellow card) 78'; Easterling 82'	Report	Ring (yellow card) 78'	Stadium: Arrow Field; Attendance: 400; Referee: Alex Connelly

== Statistics ==
As of match played October 20, 2018

=== Appearances and goals ===
No.	Pos	Nat	Player	Total		USL		USL Playoffs		U.S. Open Cup	
No.	Pos	Nat	Player	Apps	Goals	Apps	Goals	Apps	Goals	Apps	Goals
0	GK	(United States) USA	Ben Lundgaard	0	0	0	0	0	0	0	0
1	GK	(Wales) WAL	Owain Fôn Williams	36	0	34	0	1	0	1	0
2	MF	(United States) USA	Dylan Mares	12	2	10+1	2	1	0	0	0
3	DF	(Canada) CAN	Tyler Pasher	10	1	9+1	1	0	0	0	0
4	MF	(United States) USA	Brad Ring	21	0	12+8	0	0	0	1	0
5	DF	(Brazil) BRA	Reiner Ferreira	17	1	15+1	1	1	0	0	0
6	MF	(Germany) GER	Nico Matern	28	0	26	0	1	0	1	0
7	DF	(Spain) ESP	Ayoze	30	4	28	4	1	0	1	0
8	MF	(England) ENG	Matt Watson	31	1	24+6	1	1	0	0	0
9	FW	(United States) USA	Eugene Starikov	19	6	13+6	6	0	0	0	0
10	MF	(United States) USA	Ben Speas	25	3	10+13	3	1	0	1	0
12	MF	(Ghana) GHA	Amass Amankona	1	0	0	0	0	0	1	0
14	FW	(Lebanon) LBN	Soony Saad	30	5	18+10	4	0+1	1	0+1	0
16	MF	(Venezuela) VEN	Juan Guerra	26	1	15+10	1	0	0	1	0
17	FW	(United States) USA	Justin Braun	18	3	9+8	3	0	0	1	0
18	MF	(United States) USA	Seth Moses	22	0	14+6	0	1	0	1	0
19	DF	(Trinidad and Tobago) TRI	Carlyle Mitchell	32	2	31	2	1	0	0	0
20	DF	(Canada) CAN	Karl Ouimette	33	3	31	3	1	0	1	0
21	DF	(United States) USA	Brad Rusin	12	0	6+5	0	0	0	1	0
22	DF	(United States) USA	Kevin Venegas	22	1	19+2	1	0+1	0	0	0
23	MF	(United States) USA	Zach Steinberger	18	1	12+5	1	0	0	0+1	0
25	GK	(United States) USA	Jordan Farr	0	0	0	0	0	0	0	0
27	MF	(Trinidad and Tobago) TRI	Nathan Lewis	11	0	8+3	0	0	0	0	0
28	FW	(New Zealand) NZL	Elliot Collier	11	1	5+5	1	0+1	0	0	0
99	FW	(United States) USA	Jack McInerney	32	10	25+5	10	1	0	0+1	0
	MF	(Costa Rica) CRC	Diego Campos	0	0	0	0	0	0	0	0

Source: Indy stats

=== Disciplinary record ===
No.	Pos.	Name	USL		USL Playoffs		U.S. Open Cup		Total	
No.	Pos.	Name	Booked	Sent off (straight red)	Booked	Sent off (straight red)	Booked	Sent off (straight red)	Booked	Sent off (straight red)
1	GK	(Wales) Owain Fôn Williams	3	0	0	0	0	0	3	0
2	MF	(United States) Dylan Mares	1	0	0	0	0	0	1	0
4	MF	(United States) Brad Ring	5	0	0	0	1	0	6	0
5	DF	(Brazil) Reiner Ferreira	4	0	0	0	0	0	4	0
6	MF	(Germany) Nico Matern	4	1	0	0	0	0	4	1
7	DF	(Spain) Ayoze	6	0	0	0	0	0	6	0
8	MF	(England) Matt Watson	3	0	0	0	0	0	3	0
9	FW	(United States) Eugene Starikov	2	0	0	0	0	0	2	0
16	MF	(Venezuela) Juan Guerra	3	0	0	0	0	0	3	0
17	FW	(United States) Justin Braun	1	0	0	0	0	0	1	0
18	MF	(United States) Seth Moses	3	0	0	0	0	0	3	0
19	DF	(Trinidad and Tobago) Carlyle Mitchell	5	0	1	0	0	0	6	0
20	DF	(Canada) Karl Ouimette	2	2	1	0	0	0	3	2
21	DF	(United States) Brad Rusin	3	0	0	0	0	0	3	0
22	DF	(United States) Kevin Venegas	2	0	0	0	0	0	2	0
23	MF	(United States) Zach Steinberger	1	0	0	0	0	0	1	0
99	FW	(United States) Jack McInerney	7	0	0	0	0	0	7	0

Source: Indy stats

=== Clean sheets ===
No.	Name	USL	USL Playoffs	U.S. Open Cup	Total	Games Played		
No.	Name	0	(United States) Ben Lundgaard	0	0	0	0	0
1	(Wales) Owain Fôn Williams	11	0	0	11	36		
25	(United States) Jordan Farr	0	0	0	0	0		

Source: Indy stats

== Transfers ==
=== In ===
Pos.	Player	Transferred from	Fee/notes	Date	Source
DF	(Brazil) Reiner Ferreira	(United States) San Francisco Deltas	Added to the roster following receipt of his P-1 visa.	January 25, 2018	
DF	(United States) Brad Rusin	(United States) Miami FC	Terms of the contract were undisclosed.	January 25, 2018	
DF	(United States) Kevin Venegas	(United States) Minnesota United FC	Terms of the contract were undisclosed.	January 25, 2018	
MF	(Venezuela) Juan Guerra	(United States) New York Cosmos	Terms of the contract were undisclosed.	January 31, 2018	
MF	(United States) Zach Steinberger	(United States) Jacksonville Armada	Terms of the contract were undisclosed.	January 31, 2018	
GK	(United States) Jordan Farr	(United States) Corban Warriors	Terms of the contract were undisclosed.	February 2, 2018	
DF	(Canada) Karl Ouimette	(United States) San Francisco Deltas	Terms of the contract were undisclosed.	February 2, 2018	
DF	(Spain) Ayoze	(United States) New York Cosmos	Terms of the contract were undisclosed.	February 6, 2018	
FW	(United States) Eugene Starikov	(United States) New York Cosmos	Terms of the contract were undisclosed.	February 6, 2018	
DF	(Canada) Tyler Pasher	(United States) Sporting Kansas City	Terms of the contract were undisclosed.	February 7, 2018	
MF	(England) Matt Watson	(United States) Phoenix Rising	Terms of the contract were undisclosed.	February 8, 2018	
MF	(Ghana) Amass Amankona	(United States) Dayton Dutch Lions	Terms of the contract were undisclosed.	February 8, 2018	
MF	(United States) Seth Moses	Puerto Rico FC	Terms of the contract were undisclosed.	February 9, 2018	
MF	(Trinidad and Tobago) Nathan Lewis	(Trinidad and Tobago) Central	Terms of the contract were undisclosed.	February 12, 2018	
DF	(Trinidad and Tobago) Carlyle Mitchell	(Trinidad and Tobago) Central	Terms of the contract were undisclosed.	February 12, 2018	
FW	(United States) Jack McInerney	(United States) LA Galaxy	Terms of the contract were undisclosed.	February 19, 2018	
FW	(Lebanon) Soony Saad	(United States) Sporting Kansas City	Terms of the contract were undisclosed.	February 21, 2018	
MF	(Germany) Nico Matern	(United States) Indiana Wesleyan Wildcats	Terms of the contract were undisclosed.	March 13, 2018	
MF	(United States) Dylan Mares	(United States) Miami FC 2	Signed for the remainder of the 2018 season.	August 20, 2018	

=== Loan in ===
Pos.	Player	Parent club	Length/Notes	Beginning	End	Source
GK	(Wales) Owain Fôn Williams	(Scotland) Inverness Caledonian Thistle	Duration of the 2018 USL season.	February 1, 2018	October 21, 2018	
GK	(United States) Ben Lundgaard	(United States) Columbus Crew SC	Duration of the 2018 USL season.	March 7, 2018	October 21, 2018	
MF	(Costa Rica) Diego Campos	(United States) Chicago Fire	On a match-by-match basis.	August 10, 2018	October 21, 2018	
FW	(New Zealand) Elliot Collier	(United States) Chicago Fire	On a match-by-match basis.	August 10, 2018	October 21, 2018	

=== Out ===
Pos.	Player	Transferred to	Fee/notes	Date	Source
MF	(United States) Adrian Ables		Contract expired.	October 30, 2017	
GK	(United States) Jon Busch	(United States) Columbus Crew SC	Contract expired. Signed a one-day contract to retire with Columbus.	October 30, 2017	
GK	(United States) Keith Cardona		Contract expired.	October 30, 2017	
DF	(Republic of Ireland) Colin Falvey	(Canada) Ottawa Fury FC	Contract expired. Signed for Ottawa on January 23, 2018.	October 30, 2017	
DF	(United States) Marco Franco	(United States) Penn FC	Contract expired. Signed for Penn on February 27, 2018.	October 30, 2017	
FW	(England) David Goldsmith	(United States) Michigan Bucks	Contract expired. Signed for Michigan for the 2018 PDL season.	October 30, 2017	
MF	(New Zealand) Craig Henderson		Contract expired.	October 30, 2017	
DF	(United States) Daniel Keller		Contract expired.	October 30, 2017	
GK	(United States) Christian Lomeli		Contract expired.	October 30, 2017	
DF	(United States) Anthony Manning	(United States) SIMA Águilas	Contract expired. Signed with SIMA for the 2018 U.S. Open Cup.	October 30, 2017	
DF	(United States) Cory Miller	(United States) Detroit City	Contract expired. Signed with Detroit for the 2018 PDL season.	October 30, 2017	
FW	(Brazil) Paulo Jr.	(United States) Penn FC	Contract expired. Signed for Penn on June 19, 2018.	October 30, 2017	
MF	(Jamaica) Don Smart	(United States) Miami FC 2	Contract expired. Signed for Miami on March 5, 2018.	October 30, 2017	
MF	(United States) Tanner Thompson		Contract expired.	October 30, 2017	
MF	(Mexico) Gerardo Torrado		Contract expired. Retired.	October 30, 2017	
MF	(Bosnia and Herzegovina) Siniša Ubiparipović		Contract expired. Retired.	October 30, 2017	
DF	(Montenegro) Nemanja Vuković	(United States) Atlantic City FC	Contract expired. Signed for Atlantic City on February 15, 2018.	October 30, 2017	
DF	(United States) Kwame Watson-Siriboe	(Finland) KTP	Contract expired. Signed for KTP on April 13, 2018.	October 30, 2017	
FW	(Libya) Éamon Zayed	(United States) Charlotte Independence	Contract terminated. Signed for Charlotte on March 22, 2018.	January 17, 2018	

=== Loan out ===
Pos.	Player	Loanee club	Length/Notes	Beginning	End	Source
MF	(United States) Zach Steinberger	(United States) North Carolina FC	Duration of the 2018 USL season.	August 24, 2018	October 14, 2018	

== Awards ==
=== USL Team of the Week ===
Week	Starters	Bench	Opponent(s)	Link
2		(United States) Jack McInerney	Richmond Kickers	
4	(Canada) Tyler Pasher	(Wales) Owain Fôn Williams	North Carolina FC	
5	(Lebanon) Soony Saad		Nashville SC	
8	(Spain) Ayoze		FC Cincinnati; Louisville City	
12	(Spain) Ayoze		Charleston Battery	
13	(England) Matt Watson		Atlanta United 2	
14	(United States) Kevin Venegas	(United States) Justin Braun	Toronto FC II	
16	(Spain) Ayoze		Nashville SC; Penn FC	
17		(Spain) Ayoze	Ottawa Fury FC; Charlotte Independence	
20	(Wales) Owain Fôn Williams		Bethlehem Steel FC	
21	(United States) Jack McInerney		Louisville City	
23	(Brazil) Reiner Ferreira		North Carolina FC; Ottawa Fury FC	
26	(United States) Eugene Starikov		New York Red Bulls II	
29	(Canada) Karl Ouimette		Tampa Bay Rowdies; FC Cincinnati	

=== USL Player of the Week ===
Week	Player	Opponent(s)	Link
5	(Lebanon) Soony Saad	Nashville SC	

=== USL Save of the Week ===
Week	Player	Opponent	Link
4	(Wales) Owain Fôn Williams	North Carolina FC	

=== Midseason ===
USL Midseason Moments

- Best SC Top 10 – Soony Saad vs. Nashville SC, April 14
- Best Ending – vs. Charleston Battery, May 30
- Best Tifo – Brickyard Battalion, Stranger Things, March 31

=== Postseason ===
USL All-League Second Team

- DF Ayoze

== Kits ==
Home	Away

Type	Shirt	Shorts	Socks	First appearance / Record
Home	Blue	Blue	Blue	Match 2 vs. Cincinnati / 9–6–5
Away	White	White	White	Match 1 vs. Richmond / 4–5–6
Specialty	Camouflage	Blue	Blue	Match 16 vs. Ottawa / 0–0–1

== See also ==
- Indy Eleven
- 2018 in American soccer
- 2018 USL season
