= 2017 Indy Eleven season =

Indy Eleven
2017 season
- Owner: Ersal Ozdemir
- Head coach: Tim Hankinson
- Stadium: Michael Carroll Stadium
- NASL: Spring: 6th Fall: 8th Combined: 6th
- Soccer Bowl: DNQ
- U.S. Open Cup: Third Round vs Michigan Bucks
- Top goalscorer: League: Éamon Zayed (11); All: Éamon Zayed (11)
- Highest home attendance: 9,072 vs Edmonton (August 5, 2017)
- Lowest home attendance: 7,124 vs San Francisco Deltas (April 22, 2017)
- Average home league attendance: 8,395 (October 29, 2017)
Home colors	Away colors	Third colors

The 2017 Indy Eleven season was the club's fourth season of existence. The club played in North American Soccer League, which was the second tier of the American soccer pyramid.

== Roster ==
As of match played October 29, 2017

No.	Name	Nationality	Position	Date of birth (age)	Signed from	Signed in	Contract ends	Apps.	Goals
Goalkeepers
1	Keith Cardona	(United States)	GK	November 7, 1992 (aged 24)	(Austria) Liefering	2015		17	0
18	Jon Busch	(United States)	GK	August 18, 1976 (aged 41)	Chicago Fire	2016		62	0
30	Christian Lomeli	(United States)	GK	April 10, 1994 (aged 23)	Indiana Hoosiers	2017		0	0
Defenders
3	Kwame Watson-Siriboe	(United States)	DF	November 13, 1986 (aged 30)	Orange County	2017		16	0
12	Nemanja Vuković	(Montenegro)	DF	April 13, 1984 (aged 33)	Sacramento Republic	2016		64	5
13	Anthony Manning	(United States)	DF	September 4, 1992 (aged 25)	Portland Timbers	2017		5	0
16	Cory Miller	(United States)	DF	July 22, 1988 (aged 29)		2017		55	1
23	Marco Franco	(United States)	DF	October 6, 1991 (aged 26)	Chicago Fire	2015		88	0
32	Colin Falvey	(Republic of Ireland)	DF	June 20, 1985 (aged 32)	Ottawa Fury	2016		55	1
Midfielders
4	Brad Ring	(United States)	MF	April 7, 1987 (aged 30)	Portland Timbers	2014		94	4
6	Gerardo Torrado	(Mexico)	MF	April 30, 1979 (aged 38)	(Mexico) Cruz Azul	2016		41	2
7	Don Smart	(Jamaica)	MF	April 13, 1984 (aged 33)	RVA	2014		101	10
8	Craig Henderson	(New Zealand)	MF	June 24, 1987 (aged 30)	GAIS	2017		17	2
10	Siniša Ubiparipović	(Bosnia and Herzegovina)	MF	August 25, 1983 (aged 34)	Ottawa Fury	2016		37	1
14	Tanner Thompson	(United States)	MF	August 11, 1994 (aged 23)	Indiana Hoosiers	2017		21	1
15	Daniel Keller	(United States)	MF	February 7, 1992 (aged 25)	Chicago Fire U-23	2015		53	0
33	Adrian Ables	(United States)	MF	March 3, 1994 (aged 23)	Rayo OKC	2017		4	0
Forwards
9	Éamon Zayed	(Libya)	FW	August 4, 1983 (aged 34)	(Malaysia) Sabah	2016		63	27
17	Justin Braun	(United States)	FW	March 31, 1987 (aged 30)	Sacramento Republic	2016		46	16
19	Ben Speas	(United States)	FW	January 17, 1991 (aged 26)	Minnesota United FC	2017		28	4
20	David Goldsmith	(England)	FW	September 21, 1993 (aged 24)	Butler Bulldogs	2017		25	3
31	Paulo Jr.	(Brazil)	FW	January 23, 1989 (aged 28)		2017		9	0
Left Indy Eleven
5	Lovel Palmer	(Jamaica)	DF	August 30, 1984 (aged 33)	Chicago Fire	2016		38	1
21	Brandon Poltronieri	(Costa Rica)	DF	January 18, 1986 (aged 31)	Phoenix Rising	2017		2	0
91	Jason Plumhoff	(Germany)	MF	August 9, 1991 (aged 26)	Jacksonville Armada	2017		7	1

=== Staff ===
- (United States) Tim Hankinson – Head Coach
- (United States) Tim Regan – Assistant Coach

== Transfers ==
=== Winter ===
Note: Flags indicate national team as has been defined under FIFA eligibility rules. Players may hold more than one non-FIFA nationality.

In: Note: Flags indicate national team as defined under FIFA eligibility rules; some limited exceptions apply. Players may hold more than one non-FIFA nationality.

No.	Pos.	Nation	Player
3	DF	USA	Kwame Watson-Siriboe (from (United States) Orange County)
8	MF	NZL	Craig Henderson (from (Sweden) GAIS)
19	MF	USA	Ben Speas (from (United States) Minnesota United FC)
21	DF	CRC	Brandon Poltronieri (from (United States) Phoenix Rising)
33	MF	USA	Adrian Ables (from (United States) Rayo OKC)
91	MF	GER	Jason Plumhoff (from (United States) Jacksonville Armada)

Out: Note: Flags indicate national team as defined under FIFA eligibility rules; some limited exceptions apply. Players may hold more than one non-FIFA nationality.

No.	Pos.	Nation	Player
2	DF	USA	Neil Shaffer
6	MF	USA	Dylan Mares (to (United States) Miami)
8	MF	SCO	Nicki Paterson (to (Scotland) East Fife)
12	DF	USA	Greg Janicki (Retired)
14	FW	USA	Duke Lacroix (to (United States) Orange County)
16	DF	USA	Cory Miller
19	FW	POL	Wojciech Wojcik (to (United States) OKC Energy)
24	FW	COL	Jair Reinoso (to (Bolivia) CD San José)
33	MF	ESP	Gorka Larrea
91	FW	JAM	Omar Gordon (loan return to (Jamaica) Montego Bay United)
99	FW	GUI	Souleymane Youla

=== Summer ===
In: Note: Flags indicate national team as defined under FIFA eligibility rules; some limited exceptions apply. Players may hold more than one non-FIFA nationality.

No.	Pos.	Nation	Player
16	DF	USA	Cory Miller
31	FW	BRA	Paulo Jr.

Out: Note: Flags indicate national team as defined under FIFA eligibility rules; some limited exceptions apply. Players may hold more than one non-FIFA nationality.

No.	Pos.	Nation	Player
5	DF	JAM	Lovel Palmer (to (United States) Miami)
21	DF	CRC	Brandon Poltronieri
91	MF	GER	Jason Plumhoff (to (United States) Harrisburg City Islanders)

== Friendlies ==
February 24, 2017 Preseason	Butler Bulldogs	0–1	Indy Eleven	Indianapolis
17:00 CT	(yellow card) 83'	Report	Vuković 2'	Stadium: Butler Bowl

March 2, 2017 Preseason	Indy Eleven	1–1	Swope Park Rangers	Westfield
14:00 CT	Zayed 4'; Ring (yellow card) 16'; Palmer (yellow card) 16'; Smart (yellow card) 74'	Report	Mirosavic 60'; Hernandez (yellow card) 74'	Stadium: Grand Park

March 10, 2017 Preseason	Louisville Cardinals	0–0	Indy Eleven	Louisville, Kentucky
19:00 CT	Thiaw (yellow card) 24'	Report	Ring (yellow card) 44'	Stadium: Cardinal Park

March 18, 2017 Preseason	Louisville City FC	1–1	Indy Eleven	Evansville
18:00 CT	Vuković 90'	[ Report]	Lancaster 52'	Stadium: Arad McCutchan Stadium

== Competitions ==
=== NASL Spring season ===
==== Standings ====
Pos	Team	Pld	W	D	L	GF	GA	GD	Pts	Qualification
1	Miami FC (S)	16	11	3	2	33	11	+22	36	Playoffs
2	San Francisco Deltas	16	7	5	4	17	20	−3	26	
3	New York Cosmos	16	6	6	4	22	21	+1	24	
4	Jacksonville Armada	16	6	6	4	17	16	+1	24	
5	North Carolina FC	16	6	3	7	21	22	−1	21	
6	Indy Eleven	16	4	8	4	21	22	−1	20	
7	FC Edmonton	16	4	1	11	11	21	−10	13	
8	Puerto Rico FC	16	1	6	9	19	28	−9	9	

Source: NASL
Rules for classification: 1) points; 2) total goal differential; 3) total goals scored; 4) head-to-head record; 5) away goal differential; 6) away goals scored
(S) Spring season champion

==== Results summary ====
Overall								Home						Away					
Pld	W	D	L	GF	GA	GD	Pts	W	D	L	GF	GA	GD	W	D	L	GF	GA	GD
16	4	8	4	21	22	−1	20	3	3	2	10	10	0	1	5	2	11	12	−1

Last updated: July 15, 2017.
Source: Match reports

==== Results by round ====
Round	1	2	3	4	5	6	7	8	9	10	11	12	13	14	15	16
Stadium	A	H	A	H	A	H	A	H	A	A	H	H	A	A	H	H
Result	D	D	D	D	D	D	L	L	L	D	L	W	W	D	W	W
Position	1	3	5	6	6	6	6	6	7	8	6	6	6	6	6	6

Updated to match(es) played on July 15, 2017. Source: Match reports
A = Away; H = Home; W = Win; D = Draw; L = Loss

==== Matches ====
March 25, 2017 1	San Francisco Deltas	1–1	Indy Eleven	San Francisco
22:00 EDT	Bekker 31'; Attakora (yellow card) 61'; Dyego (yellow card) 66'	[ IND Report] [ NASL Report] Summary	Watson-Siriboe (yellow card) 55'; Thompson 58'; Vuković (yellow card) 61'	Stadium: Kezar Stadium; Attendance: 4,133; Referee: Baldomero Toledo

April 1, 2017 2	Indy Eleven	3–3	Puerto Rico	Indianapolis
15:00 EDT	Braun 5', 75'; Speas 10'; Thompson (yellow card) 44'; Busch (yellow card) 55'	[ IND Report] [ NASL Report] Summary	Doyle 24'; H.Ramos 45+1'; Ramírez 56' (pen.)	Stadium: Michael Carroll Stadium; Attendance: 9,064; Referee: Luis Guardia

April 8, 2017 3	Puerto Rico	1–1	Indy Eleven	Bayamón, Puerto Rico
19:30 EDT	Ramos 19'	[ IND Report] [ NASL Report] Summary	Zayed 45+3' (yellow card) 49'	Stadium: Juan Ramón Loubriel Stadium; Attendance: 3,933; Referee: Javier Santos

April 22, 2017 4	Indy Eleven	0–0	San Francisco Deltas	Indianapolis
15:00 EDT	Palmer (yellow card) 44'; Ring (yellow card) 67'; Braun (yellow card) 71'	[ IND Report] [ NASL Report] Summary		Stadium: Michael Carroll Stadium; Attendance: 7,124; Referee: Dave Gantar

April 29, 2017 5	Jacksonville Armada	1–1	Indy Eleven	Jacksonville
19:00 EDT	Glenn 30'	[ IND Report] [ NASL Report] Summary	Braun 25'; Keller (yellow card) 28'; Palmer (yellow card) 71'	Stadium: Hodges Stadium; Attendance: 3,122; Referee: Rosendo Mendoza

May 6, 2017 6	Indy Eleven	0–0	Edmonton	Indianapolis
19:30 EDT	Ring (yellow card) 34' (yellow-red card) 90'	[ IND Report] [ NASL Report] Summary	Diakité (yellow card) 51'	Stadium: Michael Carroll Stadium; Attendance: 7,159; Referee: Chipalo Street

May 13, 2017 7	Miami	3–2	Indy Eleven	Miami
19:30 EDT	Rennella 45+1'; Mares 61'; Kcira 65'; Trafford (yellow card) 76'; Vega (yellow card) 77'	[ IND Report] [ NASL Report] Summary	Torrado (yellow card) 40'; Thompson (yellow card) 60'; Freeman 56' (o.g.); Braun 83'	Stadium: Riccardo Silva Stadium; Attendance: 5,735; Referee: Ramy Touchan

May 20, 2017 8	Indy Eleven	0–2	Miami	Indianapolis
19:30 EDT	Torrado (yellow card) 76'; Goldsmith (yellow card) 77'	[ IND Report] [ NASL Report] Summary	Rennella 28'; Poku 72'	Stadium: Michael Carroll Stadium; Attendance: 7,439; Referee: Geoff Gamble

May 27, 2017 9	Edmonton	2–1	Indy Eleven	Edmonton
21:00 EDT	Corea 27' (pen.); Straith 45+3'; Sansara (yellow card) 59'; Ameobi 73'	[ IND Report] [ NASL Report] Summary	Falvey (yellow card) 10'; Torrado (yellow card) 25'; Plumhoff 80'	Stadium: Clarke Stadium; Attendance: 4,096; Referee: Dave Gantar

June 3, 2017 10	San Francisco Deltas	2–2	Indy Eleven	San Francisco
22:00 EDT	Portilla (yellow card) 78' (goal) 85'; Bekker (yellow card) 79'; Ferreira (yellow card) 89'; Teijsse (yellow card) 90+1'; Sandoval 90+3'	[ IND Report] [ NASL Report] Summary	Palmer 57'; Zayed (yellow card) 62'; Busch (yellow card) 73'; Ring 79' (yellow card) 83'	Stadium: Kezar Stadium; Attendance: 1,441; Referee: Alex Chilowicz

June 10, 2017 11	Indy Eleven	1–4	Jacksonville Armada	Indianapolis
19:30 EDT	Zayed 10'; Franco (yellow card) 30'; Palmer (red card) 45+1'; Ring (yellow card) 48'	[ IND Report] [ NASL Report] Summary	Blake 4' (yellow card) 45+1'; Banks 41', 50'; Steinberger (yellow card) 57'; Gebhard (yellow card) 60'; Patterson-Sewell (red card) 68'; Pitchkolan (yellow card) 80'	Stadium: Michael Carroll Stadium; Attendance: 8,516; Referee: Younes Marrakchi

June 17, 2017 12	Indy Eleven	2–0	North Carolina	Indianapolis
19:30 EDT	Braun 60'; Smart (yellow card) 77'; Speas 84'; Ring (yellow card) 90+1'	[ IND Report] [ NASL Report] Summary		Stadium: Michael Carroll Stadium; Attendance: 8,092; Referee: Geoff Gamble

June 24, 2017 13	North Carolina	1–2	Indy Eleven	Cary
19:30 EDT	Shipalane 9'; Ibeagha (yellow card) 29'; Moses (yellow card) 56'	[ IND Report] [ NASL Report] Summary	Braun 21'; Zayed 23'; Smart (yellow card) 45+1'; Busch (yellow card) 87'	Stadium: WakeMed Soccer Park; Attendance: 3,494; Referee: Jon Freemon

July 4, 2017 14	New York Cosmos	1–1	Indy Eleven	Brooklyn
19:30 EDT	Calvillo (yellow card) 72'; Ledesma 86' (pen.); Richter (yellow card) 90+4'	[ IND Report] [ NASL Report] Summary	Speas 33'; Goldsmith (yellow card) 78'; Palmer (yellow card) 90'	Stadium: MCU Park; Attendance: 6,734; Referee: Marcos de Oliveira

July 8, 2017 15	Indy Eleven	2–1	New York Cosmos	Indianapolis
19:30 EDT	Smart 17' (pen.); Braun 75'	[ IND Report] [ NASL Report] Summary	Ledesma 27'; Bardic (yellow card) 90+1'	Stadium: Michael Carroll Stadium; Attendance: 8,748; Referee: Alejandro Mariscal

July 15, 2017 16	Indy Eleven	2–0	Jacksonville Armada	Indianapolis
18:30 EDT	Vuković 48'; Zayed (yellow card) 59'; Henderson 68'	[ IND Report] [ NASL Report] Summary		Stadium: Michael Carroll Stadium; Attendance: 8,735; Referee: Alex Chilowicz

=== NASL Fall season ===
==== Standings ====
Pos	Team	Pld	W	D	L	GF	GA	GD	Pts	Qualification
1	Miami FC (F)	16	10	3	3	28	17	+11	33	Playoffs
2	San Francisco Deltas	16	7	7	2	24	15	+9	28	
3	North Carolina FC	16	5	9	2	25	15	+10	24	
4	New York Cosmos	16	4	9	3	34	30	+4	21	
5	Jacksonville Armada	16	4	7	5	21	22	−1	19	
6	Puerto Rico FC	16	4	4	8	13	23	−10	16	
7	FC Edmonton	16	3	5	8	14	21	−7	14	
8	Indy Eleven	16	3	4	9	18	34	−16	13	

Source: NASL
Rules for classification: 1) points; 2) total goal differential; 3) total goals scored; 4) head-to-head record; 5) away goal differential; 6) away goals scored
(F) Fall season champion

==== Results summary ====
Overall								Home						Away					
Pld	W	D	L	GF	GA	GD	Pts	W	D	L	GF	GA	GD	W	D	L	GF	GA	GD
16	3	4	9	18	32	−14	13	2	2	4	10	14	−4	1	2	5	8	18	−10

Last updated: October 29, 2017.
Source: Match reports

==== Results by round ====
Round	1	2	3	4	5	6	7	8	9	10	11	12	13	14	15	16
Stadium	A	H	A	A	H	H	H	A	A	A	H	H	A	H	A	H
Result	W	L	L	D	L	L	W	L	D	L	W	D	L	L	L	D
Position	2	6	7	7	8	8	8	8	8	8	6	7	7	7	8	8

Updated to match(es) played on October 29, 2017. Source: Match reports
A = Away; H = Home; W = Win; D = Draw; L = Loss

==== Matches ====
July 30, 2017 17	Edmonton	1–2	Indy Eleven	Edmonton
16:00 EDT	Ameobi 33'; McKendry (yellow card) 63'	[ IND Report] [ NASL Report] Summary	Goldsmith 7'; Zayed 41'; Torrado (yellow card) 66'; Smart (yellow card) 77'	Stadium: Clarke Stadium; Attendance: 3,285; Referee: David Barrie

August 5, 2017 18	Indy Eleven	1–3	Edmonton	Indianapolis
19:30 EDT	Torrado (yellow card) 52'; Vuković 66'; Ring (yellow card) 74'	[ IND Report] [ NASL Report] Summary	Ledgerwood (yellow card) 34'; Corea 53' (pen.), 73'; Watson 59'; Diakité (yellow card) 65'; Farago (yellow card) 83'; Nicklaw (yellow card) 90'	Stadium: Michael Carroll Stadium; Attendance: 9,072; Referee: Guido Gonzalez

August 12, 2017 19	Miami	3–1	Indy Eleven	Miami
19:30 EDT	Stefano 47', 69'; Lahoud (yellow card) 53'; Mares 60'	[ IND Report] [ NASL Report] Summary	Falvey (yellow card) 50'; Torrado (yellow card) 63'; Ring (yellow card) 82'; Zayed 88'	Stadium: Riccardo Silva Stadium; Attendance: 5,003; Referee: Victor Rivas

August 19, 2017 20	New York Cosmos	3–3	Indy Eleven	Brooklyn
19:30 EDT	Jakovic 29'; Vranjicán 50'; Mulligan (yellow card) 57'; Guerra 84'	[ IND Report] [ NASL Report] Summary	Torrado 10', 14' (yellow card) 35'; Zayed 53'; Smart (yellow card) 90+8'	Stadium: MCU Park; Attendance: 6,110; Referee: Dave Gantar

August 26, 2017 21	Indy Eleven	2–3	Jacksonville Armada	Indianapolis
19:30 EDT	Keller (yellow card) 35'; Watson-Siriboe (yellow card) 38'; Braun (yellow card) 61'; Speas 66' (yellow card) 83'; Goldsmith 90+2'	[ IND Report] [ NASL Report] Summary	Blake (yellow card) 20' (goal) 28', 40', 62'; Banks (yellow card) 44'; Rebellón (yellow card) 76'	Stadium: Michael Carroll Stadium; Attendance: 8,862; Referee: Rubiel Vazquez

September 2, 2017 22	Indy Eleven	0–2	San Francisco Deltas	Indianapolis
19:30 EDT	Franco (yellow card) 74'	[ IND Report] [ NASL Report] Summary	Dyego 41', 87'	Stadium: Michael Carroll Stadium; Attendance: 8,702; Referee: Juan Guzmán

September 9, 2017 23	Jacksonville Armada	–	Indy Eleven	Jacksonville
19:00 EDT		[ IND Report] [ NASL Report] [ Summary]		Stadium: Hodges Stadium
Note: Match rescheduled to September 27 due to Hurricane Irma.

September 13, 2017 24	Indy Eleven	1–0	North Carolina	Indianapolis
19:00 EDT	Torrado (yellow card) 32'; Zayed 90+1'	[ IND Report] [ NASL Report] Summary	Marcelin (red card) 40' da Luz (yellow card) 80'	Stadium: Michael Carroll Stadium; Attendance: 7,798; Referee: Geoff Gamble

September 17, 2017 25	Edmonton	2–0	Indy Eleven	Edmonton
16:00 EDT	Nyassi 31'; Corea 77' (pen.)	[ IND Report] [ NASL Report] Summary	Falvey (yellow card) 69'; Smart (yellow card) 80'	Stadium: Clarke Stadium; Attendance: 3,027; Referee: Pierre Lauziere

September 23, 2017 26	Indy Eleven	–	Puerto Rico	Indianapolis
19:30 EDT		[ IND Report] [ NASL Report] [ Summary]		Stadium: Michael Carroll Stadium
Note: Match postponed until October 4 due to Hurricane Irma.

September 27, 2017 23	Jacksonville Armada	0–0	Indy Eleven	Jacksonville
19:00 EDT	George (yellow card) 21'; Kilduff (yellow card) 32'; Pitchkolan (yellow card) 62'	[ IND Report] [ NASL Report] Summary	Smart (yellow card) 37'; Ring (yellow card) 69'	Stadium: Hodges Stadium; Attendance: 1,881; Referee: Daniel Gutierrez
Note: Match rescheduled from September 9 due to Hurricane Irma.

October 1, 2017 27	North Carolina	5–0	Indy Eleven	Cary
16:00 EDT	Renan 9', 45+1' (pen.); Albadawi 32'; Miller 35'; Fortune 90'	[ IND Report] [ NASL Report] Summary		Stadium: WakeMed Soccer Park; Attendance: 4,209; Referee: Alex Chilowicz

October 4, 2017 26	Indy Eleven	2–1	Puerto Rico	Indianapolis
19:30 EDT	Zayed 37', 62'; Torrado (yellow card) 55'; Miller (yellow card) 86'; Goldsmith (yellow card) 90+2'; Watson-Siriboe (yellow card) 90+3'	[ IND Report] [ NASL Report] Summary	Gentile (yellow card) 67' (goal) 88' (pen.)	Stadium: Michael Carroll Stadium; Attendance: 8,272; Referee: Jon Freemon
Note: Match rescheduled from September 23 due to Hurricane Irma.

October 7, 2017 28	Indy Eleven	2–2	New York Cosmos	Indianapolis
19:30 EDT	Smart 27'; Falvey (yellow card) 32'; Ring (yellow card) 53'; Torrado (yellow card) 53'; Zayed 64' (yellow card) 90+3'	[ IND Report] [ NASL Report] Summary	Ledesma 36'; Márquez 69'; Ochieng (yellow card) 90+3'	Stadium: Michael Carroll Stadium; Attendance: 8,998; Referee: Juan Guzmán

October 11, 2017 29	San Francisco Deltas	2–1	Indy Eleven	San Francisco
22:30 EDT	Falvey 12' (o.g.); Jackson (yellow card) 60'; Dagoberto 81' (yellow card) 83'	[ IND Report] [ NASL Report] Summary	Henderson 7' (yellow card) 36'; Ring (yellow card) 35'; Thompson (yellow card) 42'; Watson-Siriboe (yellow card) 90+1'; Miller (yellow card) 90+1'	Stadium: Kezar Stadium; Attendance: 1,542; Referee: Baboucarr Jallow

October 14, 2017 30	Indy Eleven	0–3	Miami	Indianapolis
15:00 EDT	Torrado (yellow card) 41'	[ IND Report] [ NASL Report] Summary	Stefano 4', 34'; Mares 38'	Stadium: Michael Carroll Stadium; Attendance: 8,925; Referee: Geoff Gamble

October 21, 2017 31	Puerto Rico	2–1	Indy Eleven	Bayamón, Puerto Rico
19:30 EDT	Rivera 5'; Welshman 43'; Mario (yellow card) 54'; Pack (yellow card) 90+4'	[ IND Report] [ NASL Report] Summary	Miller (yellow card) 30'; Ubiparipović (yellow card) 65'; Keller (yellow card) 70'; Goldsmith 82'; Falvey (yellow card) 86'	Stadium: Juan Ramón Loubriel Stadium; Attendance: 3,421; Referee: Rosendo Mendoza

October 29, 2017 32	Indy Eleven	2–2	North Carolina	Indianapolis
17:00 EDT	Zayed 20'; Miller 65'; Goldsmith (yellow card) 88'	[ IND Report] [ NASL Report] Summary	Schuler 4', 89'; Barrow (yellow card) 19'	Stadium: Michael Carroll Stadium; Attendance: 8,813; Referee: Mark Kadlecik

=== U.S. Open Cup ===
May 17, 2017 Third round	Michigan Bucks	1–0	Indy Eleven	Pontiac
19:30 EDT	Atuahene 35'; Cerda (yellow card) 49'	IND Report [ NASL Report] Summary	Manning (yellow card) 88'	Stadium: Ultimate Soccer Arenas; Attendance: 1,000

== Squad statistics ==
As of match played October 29, 2017

=== Appearances and goals ===
No.	Pos	Nat	Player	Total		NASL Spring Season		NASL Fall Season		U.S. Open Cup	
No.	Pos	Nat	Player	Apps	Goals	Apps	Goals	Apps	Goals	Apps	Goals
1	GK	(United States) USA	Keith Cardona	3	0	1	0	1	0	1	0
3	DF	(United States) USA	Kwame Watson-Siriboe	16	0	7+2	0	3+3	0	1	0
4	MF	(United States) USA	Brad Ring	30	1	15	1	14	0	1	0
6	MF	(Mexico) MEX	Gerardo Torrado	23	2	10	0	12+1	2	0	0
7	MF	(Jamaica) JAM	Don Smart	21	2	9+1	1	10+1	1	0	0
8	MF	(New Zealand) NZL	Craig Henderson	18	2	3+7	1	4+4	1	0	0
9	FW	(Libya) LBA	Éamon Zayed	28	11	11+2	3	14+1	8	0	0
10	MF	(Bosnia and Herzegovina) BIH	Siniša Ubiparipović	20	0	9+2	0	3+6	0	0	0
12	DF	(Montenegro) MNE	Nemanja Vuković	29	2	13	1	15	1	1	0
13	DF	(United States) USA	Anthony Manning	5	0	0+4	0	0	0	1	0
14	MF	(United States) USA	Tanner Thompson	21	1	6+2	1	5+7	0	1	0
15	MF	(United States) USA	Daniel Keller	27	0	13+3	0	9+1	0	1	0
16	DF	(United States) USA	Cory Miller	11	1	0	0	10+1	1	0	0
17	FW	(United States) USA	Justin Braun	17	7	14	7	0+2	0	1	0
18	GK	(United States) USA	Jon Busch	30	0	15	0	15	0	0	0
19	FW	(United States) USA	Ben Speas	28	4	11+1	3	14+1	1	0+1	0
20	FW	(England) ENG	David Goldsmith	26	3	1+9	0	9+6	3	1	0
23	DF	(United States) USA	Marco Franco	31	0	14	0	16	0	0+1	0
31	FW	(Brazil) BRA	Paulo Jr.	9	0	0	0	6+3	0	0	0
32	DF	(Republic of Ireland) IRL	Colin Falvey	29	0	14	0	15	0	0	0
33	MF	(United States) USA	Adrian Ables	4	0	0	0	0+4	0	0	0
Players away on loan:
Players who left Indy Eleven during the season:
5	DF	(Jamaica) JAM	Lovel Palmer	14	1	8+4	1	1	0	1	0
21	DF	(Costa Rica) CRC	Brandon Poltronieri	2	0	1+1	0	0	0	0	0
91	MF	(Germany) GER	Jason Plumhoff	7	1	1+5	1	0	0	1	0

=== Goal scorers ===
Place	Position	Nation	Number	Name	NASL Spring Season	NASL Fall Season	U.S. Open Cup	Total
1	FW	(Libya)	9	Éamon Zayed	3	8	0	11
2	FW	(United States)	17	Justin Braun	7	0	0	7
3	FW	(United States)	19	Ben Speas	3	1	0	4
4	FW	(England)	20	David Goldsmith	0	3	0	3
5	DF	(Montenegro)	12	Nemanja Vuković	1	1	0	2
5	MF	(Jamaica)	7	Don Smart	1	1	0	2
5	MF	(Mexico)	6	Gerardo Torrado	0	2	0	2
5	MF	(New Zealand)	8	Craig Henderson	1	1	0	2
9	MF	(United States)	14	Tanner Thompson	1	0	0	1
9	MF	(Germany)	91	Jason Plumhoff	1	0	0	1
9	DF	(Jamaica)	5	Lovel Palmer	1	0	0	1
9	MF	(United States)	4	Brad Ring	1	0	0	1
9	DF	(United States)	16	Cory Miller	0	1	0	1
9				Own goal	1	0	0	1
TOTALS					20	18	0	38

=== Disciplinary record ===
Number	Nation	Position	Name	NASL Spring Season		NASL Fall Season		U.S. Open Cup		Total	
Number	Nation	Position	Name	Yellow card	Red card	Yellow card	Red card	Yellow card	Red card	Yellow card	Red card
3	(United States)	DF	Kwame Watson-Siriboe	1	0	3	0	0	0	4	0
4	(United States)	MF	Brad Ring	6	1	5	0	0	0	11	1
5	(Jamaica)	DF	Lovel Palmer	3	1	0	0	0	0	3	1
6	(Mexico)	MF	Gerardo Torrado	3	0	8	0	0	0	11	0
7	(Jamaica)	MF	Don Smart	2	0	4	0	0	0	6	0
8	(New Zealand)	MF	Craig Henderson	0	0	1	0	0	0	1	0
9	(Libya)	FW	Éamon Zayed	3	0	1	0	0	0	4	0
10	(Bosnia and Herzegovina)	MF	Siniša Ubiparipović	0	0	1	0	0	0	1	0
12	(Montenegro)	DF	Nemanja Vuković	1	0	0	0	0	0	1	0
13	(United States)	DF	Anthony Manning	0	0	0	0	1	0	1	0
14	(United States)	MF	Tanner Thompson	2	0	1	0	0	0	3	0
15	(United States)	MF	Daniel Keller	1	0	2	0	0	0	3	0
16	(United States)	DF	Cory Miller	0	0	3	0	0	0	3	0
17	(United States)	FW	Justin Braun	1	0	1	0	0	0	2	0
18	(United States)	GK	Jon Busch	3	0	0	0	0	0	3	0
19	(United States)	FW	Ben Speas	0	0	1	0	0	0	1	0
20	(England)	FW	David Goldsmith	2	0	2	0	0	0	4	0
23	(United States)	DF	Marco Franco	1	0	2	0	0	0	3	0
32	(Republic of Ireland)	DF	Colin Falvey	1	0	3	0	0	0	4	0
			TOTALS	30	2	38	0	1	0	69	2
