= 2019 Indy Eleven season =

Indy Eleven
2019 season
- Owner: List: Brian Bauer Don Gottwald Shane Hageman Jeffrey Laborsky Fred Merritt Ersal Ozdemir Quinn Ricker Chris Traylor
- Head coach: Martin Rennie
- USL Championship: Eastern Conference: 3rd
- USLC Playoffs: Conference Final
- U.S. Open Cup: Third Round
- Top goalscorer: League: Tyler Pasher (8); All: Tyler Pasher (8)
- Highest home attendance: League/All: 20,251 (March 30 vs. Hartford)
- Lowest home attendance: League: 8,035 (May 1 vs. Tampa Bay); All: 853 (May 15 vs. Lansing, USOC )
- Average home league attendance: 10,734
- Biggest win: 3–0 (June 26 vs. Birmingham)
- Biggest defeat: 0–3 (Sept. 28 at Pittsburgh)
| Home colors | Away colors |

The 2019 Indy Eleven season was the club's sixth season of existence, their sixth consecutive season in the second tier of American soccer, and their second season in the league now named the USL Championship. The season covers the period from October 21, 2018, to the beginning of the 2020 USL Championship season.

== Roster ==
As of match played May 4, 2019

| No. | Name | Nationality | Position(s) | Date of birth (age) | Signed in | Previous club | Apps. | Goals |
Goalkeepers
| 0 | Jordan Farr | (United States) | GK | October 5, 1994 (age 32) | 2018 | (United States) Corban Warriors | 0 | 0 |
| 1 | Evan Newton | (United States) | GK | April 1, 1988 (age 38) | 2019 | (United States) FC Cincinnati | 8 | 0 |
| 24 | Mario Perez | (United States) | GK | February 16, 2000 (age 26) | 2019 | (United States) Indiana Fire Academy | 0 | 0 |
Defenders
| 2 | Lucas Farias | (Brazil) | DF | August 18, 1994 (age 32) | 2019 | (Brazil) São Bento | 1 | 0 |
| 3 | Macauley King | (England) | DF | October 4, 1995 (age 31) | 2019 | (United States) Young Harris Mountain Lions | 6 | 1 |
| 5 | Mitch Osmond | (Australia) | DF | March 11, 1994 (age 32) | 2019 | (United States) Rio Grande RedStorm | 0 | 0 |
| 7 | Ayoze | (Spain) | DF | November 22, 1985 (age 40) | 2018 | (United States) New York Cosmos | 36 | 4 |
| 20 | Karl Ouimette | (Canada) | DF | June 18, 1992 (age 34) | 2018 | (United States) San Francisco Deltas | 37 | 3 |
| 29 | Paddy Barrett | (Republic of Ireland) | DF | August 22, 1993 (age 33) | 2019 | (United States) FC Cincinnati | 7 | 0 |
Midfielders
| 4 | Tyler Gibson | (United States) | MF | January 12, 1991 (age 35) | 2019 | (United States) FC Cincinnati | 8 | 1 |
| 6 | Nico Matern | (Germany) | MF | November 27, 1992 (age 33) | 2018 | (United States) Indiana Wesleyan Wildcats | 34 | 0 |
| 8 | Matt Watson | (England) | MF | January 1, 1985 (age 41) | 2018 | (United States) Phoenix Rising | 39 | 1 |
| 15 | Neveal Hackshaw | (Trinidad and Tobago) | MF | September 21, 1995 (age 31) | 2019 | (United States) Charleston Battery | 8 | 2 |
| 19 | Kenney Walker | (United States) | MF | December 23, 1988 (age 37) | 2019 | (United States) FC Cincinnati | 5 | 0 |
| 23 | Tyler Pasher | (Canada) | MF | April 27, 1994 (age 32) | 2018 | (United States) Sporting Kansas City | 17 | 2 |
| 25 | Do-heon Kim | (South Korea) | MF | July 14, 1982 (age 44) | 2019 | (Malaysia) Negeri Sembilan | 2 | 0 |
Forwards
| 9 | Eugene Starikov | (United States) | FW | November 17, 1988 (age 37) | 2018 | (United States) New York Cosmos | 22 | 6 |
| 10 | Thomas Enevoldsen | (Denmark) | FW | July 27, 1987 (age 39) | 2019 | (United States) Orange County SC | 8 | 2 |
| 14 | Ilija Ilić | (Serbia) | FW | April 26, 1991 (age 35) | 2019 | (United States) Louisville City | 1 | 0 |
| 17 | Dane Kelly | (Jamaica) | FW | February 9, 1991 (age 35) | 2019 | (United States) D.C. United | 8 | 4 |
| 18 | Alioune Diakhate | (Senegal) | FW | April 10, 1994 (age 32) | 2019 | (Spain) C.D. Oller | 6 | 0 |
| 27 | Joshua Penn | (United States) | FW | November 25, 2000 (age 25) | 2019 | (United States) Chicago Sockers FC | 3 | 0 |
Out on loan
| — | Ben Speas | (United States) | MF | January 17, 1991 (age 35) | 2017 | (United States) Minnesota United | 52 | 7 |

== Non-competitive ==
=== Preseason ===
The Eleven released their preseason schedule on January 23, 2019. A four-game preseason slate was initially announced, featuring matches against teams from Major League Soccer, the USL Championship, USL League One, and one collegiate program. A fifth game, against Forward Madison FC, was later added to the schedule.

| February 9 Friendly | Indy Eleven | 0–0 | Butler Bulldogs | Westfield, IN |
| 7:00 PM EST | Starikov (yellow card) 21' | Report | | Stadium: Grand Park |

| February 12 Friendly | Indy Eleven | 3–2 | FC Cincinnati | Westfield, IN |
| 1:00 PM EST | Trialist 29'; Watson 34'; Kelly 60' | Report | Hagglund 12'; Mattocks 35'; Smith (yellow card) 77' | Stadium: Grand Park |

| February 22 Friendly | Forward Madison | 1–0 | Indy Eleven | Rockford, IL |
| 3:00 PM EST | Bartley 55' | Report | Walker (yellow card) 82' | Stadium: Mercyhealth Sportscore Two |

| February 27 Friendly | Indy Eleven | 1–2 | Lansing Ignite | Westfield, IN |
| 2:00 PM EST | Pasher (yellow card) 49'; King 68' | Report | Saint-Duc 21' (pen.); Trialist 78' | Stadium: Grand Park |

| March 2 Friendly | Indy Eleven | 0–0 | Nashville SC | Evansville, IN |
| 3:00 PM EST | Barrett (yellow card) 55' | Report | | Stadium: Arad McCutchan Stadium |

=== Midseason ===
| August 13 Friendly | Detroit City FC | 0–1 | Indy Eleven | Hamtramck, MI |
| 7:30 PM EST | | Report | Ilić (yellow card) 30'; King (red card) 47'; Starikov 71' | Stadium: Keyworth Stadium; Attendance: 4,350 |
Note: Indy was allowed to replace King after his sending off.

== Competitive ==
=== USL Championship ===
==== Standings ====
| Pos | Team | Pld | W | D | L | GF | GA | GD | Pts | Qualification |
|---|---|---|---|---|---|---|---|---|---|---|
| 1 | Pittsburgh Riverhounds SC | 34 | 19 | 11 | 4 | 58 | 30 | +28 | 68 | Conference Quarterfinals |
| 2 | Nashville SC | 34 | 20 | 7 | 7 | 59 | 26 | +33 | 67 | Conference Quarterfinals |
| 3 | Indy Eleven | 34 | 19 | 6 | 9 | 48 | 29 | +19 | 63 | Conference Quarterfinals |
| 4 | Louisville City FC | 34 | 17 | 9 | 8 | 58 | 41 | +17 | 60 | Conference Quarterfinals |
| 5 | Tampa Bay Rowdies | 34 | 16 | 10 | 8 | 61 | 33 | +28 | 58 | Conference Quarterfinals |

Source: USL Championship Standings
Rules for classification: 1) total wins; 2) total goal differential; 3) total goals scored; 4) points earned against top four Conference finishers; 5) disciplinary points; 6) coin toss or drawing of lots

==== Results by round ====
| Round | 1 | 2 | 3 | 4 | 5 | 6 | 7 | 8 | 9 | 10 | 11 | 12 | 13 | 14 | 15 | 16 | 17 | 18 | 19 | 20 | 21 | 22 | 23 | 24 | 25 | 26 | 27 | 28 | 29 | 30 | 31 | 32 | 33 | 34 |
|---|---|---|---|---|---|---|---|---|---|---|---|---|---|---|---|---|---|---|---|---|---|---|---|---|---|---|---|---|---|---|---|---|---|---|
| Stadium | A | A | H | A | A | A | H | H | H | H | H | A | A | H | H | H | A | H | A | A | H | H | A | H | A | H | H | A | A | A | A | H | A | H |
| Result | L | W | W | W | W | L | D | D | W | D | W | W | W | W | W | D | L | W | L | W | W | W | D | W | L | W | W | L | L | L | L | W | D | W |

Source: Indy schedule
A = Away; H = Home; W = Win; D = Draw; L = Loss

==== Match results ====
The league announced home openers for every club on December 14, 2018. Indy will open at Lucas Oil Stadium on March 30, meeting expansion club Hartford Athletic for the first time. The Eleven will also take part in the home openers for two other clubs, facing Saint Louis FC on March 9 and Charlotte Independence on March 15.

The full Indy schedule was released on December 19, 2018. The season will once again consist of 34 matches, with the Eleven playing home and away against each Eastern Conference opponent. Indy will face expansion clubs Birmingham Legion FC, Hartford Athletic, Loudoun United FC, and Memphis 901 FC for the first time ever, and will also play inaugural matches against Saint Louis FC and Swope Park Rangers, who move over from the Western Conference.

| March 9 1 | Saint Louis FC | 2–1 | Indy Eleven | Fenton, MO |
| 1:00 PM EST | Kavita 69'; Fink (yellow card) 72'; Cicerone 76' | Report | Hackshaw (yellow card) 57', (goal) 61'; Barrett (yellow card) 64' | Stadium: Toyota Stadium; Attendance: 4,561; Referee: Rosendo Mendoza |

| March 15 2 | Charlotte Independence | 2–3 | Indy Eleven | Matthews, NC |
| 6:00 PM EDT | Taku (yellow card) 26'; A. Martínez (yellow card) 56'; Oduro 73'; Gutman 83' | Report | King 12'; Gibson 15'; Enevoldsen 69' | Stadium: Sportsplex at Matthews; Attendance: 1,649; Referee: Gustavo Solorio |

| March 30 3 | Indy Eleven | 1–0 | Hartford Athletic | Indianapolis, IN |
| 7:00 PM EDT | Lyngø 40' (o.g.); Ayoze (yellow card) 58'; Gibson (yellow card) 63'; Matern (yellow card) 69' | Report | | Stadium: Lucas Oil Stadium; Attendance: 20,251; Referee: Lukasz Szpala |

| April 15 4 | Swope Park Rangers | 1–3 | Indy Eleven | Kansas City, KS |
| 8:00 PM EDT | Harris 26'; Kuzain (yellow card) 30'; Ngom (yellow card) 61' | Report | Kelly 2', 53', (yellow card) 33'; Enevoldsen 6'; Crognale (yellow card) 41' | Stadium: Children's Mercy Park; Attendance: 232; Referee: Kevin Broadley |

| April 20 5 | Bethlehem Steel FC | 0–3 | Indy Eleven | Chester, PA |
| 4:00 PM EDT | Ofeimu (yellow card) 53'; Faris (yellow card) 80' | Report | Hackshaw 26'; Kelly 28'; Pasher 73' | Stadium: Talen Energy Stadium; Attendance: 1,537; Referee: Jon Freemon |

| April 28 6 | New York Red Bulls II | 2–1 | Indy Eleven | Montclair, NJ |
| 5:00 PM EDT | Scarlett (yellow card) 39'; Stroud 60' (pen.); Barlow 69'; Zajec (yellow card) 78' | Report | Kelly 13'; King (yellow card) 59' | Stadium: MSU Soccer Park at Pittser Field; Attendance: 542; Referee: David Barrie |

| May 1 7 | Indy Eleven | 0–0 | Tampa Bay Rowdies | Indianapolis, IN |
| 7:00 PM EDT | Barrett (yellow card) 13' (yellow-red card) 20' | Report | Taylor (yellow card) 88' | Stadium: Lucas Oil Stadium; Attendance: 8,035; Referee: Elvis Osmanovic |

| May 4 8 | Indy Eleven | 0–0 | North Carolina FC | Indianapolis, IN |
| 7:00 PM EDT | Diakhate (yellow card) 90+1' | Report | | Stadium: Lucas Oil Stadium; Attendance: 9,017; Referee: Sergii Demianchuk |

| May 18 9 | Indy Eleven | 1–0 | Charleston Battery | Indianapolis, IN |
| 7:00 PM EDT | Pasher (yellow card) 51', (goal) 84'; Kelly (yellow card) 67' | Report | Mason (yellow card) 89' | Stadium: Lucas Oil Stadium; Attendance: 9,259; Referee: Lukasz Szpala |

| May 25 10 | Indy Eleven | 0–0 | Nashville SC | Indianapolis, IN |
| 7:00 PM EDT | | Report | Bourgeois (yellow card) 54'; Washington (yellow card) 90+1' | Stadium: Lucas Oil Stadium; Attendance: 10,037; Referee: Rosendo Mendoza |

| June 1 11 | Indy Eleven | 2–1 | Pittsburgh Riverhounds SC | Indianapolis, IN |
| 7:00 PM EDT | Kim (yellow card) 60'; Walker 71'; Pasher 81' | Report | Mertz 15'; Forrest (red card) 90+1' | Stadium: Lucas Oil Stadium; Attendance: 10,071; Referee: Lorant Varga |

| June 8 12 | Memphis 901 | 0–3 | Indy Eleven | Memphis, TN |
| 8:30 PM EDT | Charpie (yellow card) 51'; Burch (yellow card) 90+3' | Report | Enevoldsen 31'; Kim 52'; Pasher 58' | Stadium: AutoZone Park; Attendance: 6,829; Referee: Malik Badawi |

| June 15 13 | Loudoun United | 1–2 | Indy Eleven | Washington, DC |
| 7:30 PM EDT | Lubahn 12'; Martinez (yellow card) 86' | Report | Martinez 66' (o.g.); Pasher 89' | Stadium: Audi Field; Referee: Thomas Snyder |

| June 22 14 | Indy Eleven | 1–0 | Atlanta United 2 | Indianapolis, IN |
| 7:00 PM EDT | Do-heon (yellow card) 18'; Gibson (yellow card) 68'; Diakhate 84'; Pasher (yellow card) 90+3' | Report | Benítez (yellow card) 12'; Hernández (yellow card) 33'; Wyke (yellow card) 54'; Kissiedou (yellow card) 68'; Decas (yellow card) 74' | Stadium: Lucas Oil Stadium; Attendance: 11,137; Referee: Elijio Arreguin |

| June 26 15 | Indy Eleven | 3–0 | Birmingham Legion | Indianapolis, IN |
| 7:00 PM EDT | Pasher 7'; Osmond (yellow card) 32'; Laurent 44' (o.g.); Enevoldsen (yellow card) 82', (goal) 90+1' | Report | Mabiala (yellow card) 25' | Stadium: Lucas Oil Stadium; Attendance: 9,248; Referee: Ismir Pekmic |

| June 29 16 | Indy Eleven | 1–1 | Louisville City | Indianapolis, IN |
| 7:00 PM EDT | Pasher 9'; Farias (yellow card) 45+3'; Osmond (yellow card) 69'; Ayoze (yellow card) 80' | Report | Craig (yellow card) 29'; DelPiccolo (yellow card) 53', (goal) 55'; Souahy (yellow card) 64' | Stadium: Lucas Oil Stadium; Attendance: 10,584; Referee: Farhad Dadkho |

| July 13 17 | Hartford Athletic | 2–1 | Indy Eleven | Hartford, CT |
| 7:00 PM EDT | Angulo 58'; Wojcik 72' | Report | Ayoze 88' (pen.); Hackshaw (yellow card) 89' | Stadium: Dillon Stadium; Attendance: 5,500; Referee: Sergii Demianchuk |

| July 20 18 | Indy Eleven | 2–0 | Loudoun United | Indianapolis, IN |
| 7:00 PM EDT | Gibson (yellow card) 24'; Barrett (yellow card) 50'; Ayoze (yellow card) 55'; Osmond (yellow card) 73'; Enevoldsen 81'; Kelly (yellow card) 83'; Pasher 90+1' | Report | Verfurth (yellow card) 5'; Edwards (yellow card) 87' | Stadium: Lucas Oil Stadium; Attendance: 11,059; Referee: Matthew Corrigan |

| July 27 19 | Nashville SC | 2–0 | Indy Eleven | Nashville, TN |
| 8:00 PM EDT | Ríos 24', (yellow card) 57'; Winn 42' | Report | Pasher (yellow card) 17' | Stadium: Nissan Stadium; Attendance: 13,047; Referee: Elvis Osmanovic |

| August 3 20 | North Carolina FC | 1–2 | Indy Eleven | Cary, NC |
| 7:00 PM EDT | Guillén (yellow card) 27'; Albadawi (yellow card) 43'; Fortune 69'; Speas (yellow card) 90+4' | Report | Watson 15'; Barrett (yellow card) 84'; Ilić 87' | Stadium: Sahlen's Stadium; Attendance: 4,393; Referee: Guido Gonzales Jr. |

| August 18 21 | Indy Eleven | 2–1 | Saint Louis FC | Indianapolis, IN |
| 6:00 PM EDT | Pasher 67'; Kelly 81'; Conner (yellow card) 84' | Report | Fernandez (yellow card) 75'; Hilton 90+2' | Stadium: Lucas Oil Stadium; Attendance: 10,035; Referee: Elton García |

| August 25 22 | Indy Eleven | 3–1 | Charlotte Independence | Indianapolis, IN |
| 6:00 PM EDT | Ouimette 41'; Conner 53', 83' | Report | Martínez (yellow card) 8'; Jackson 15'; Oduro (yellow card) 41'; Maund (yellow card) 70' | Stadium: Lucas Oil Stadium; Attendance: 10,089; Referee: Matthew Thompson |

| August 30 23 | Louisville City | 1–1 | Indy Eleven | Louisville, KY |
| 7:00 PM EDT | Craig (yellow card) 21'; Thiam 70', (yellow card) 82'; McCabe (yellow card) 90+4' | Report | Pasher 43'; Newton (yellow card) 82'; Ouimette (yellow card) 87'; Ayoze (yellow card) 90' | Stadium: Louisville Slugger Field; Attendance: 9,211; Referee: Mark Allatin |

| September 4 24 | Indy Eleven | 1–0 | New York Red Bulls II | Indianapolis, IN |
| 7:00 PM EDT | Conner (yellow card) 17'; Barrett (yellow card) 28'; Walker (yellow card) 61'; Ouimette (yellow card) 79'; Kelly 83' | Report | Tarek (yellow card) 90+2' | Stadium: Lucas Oil Stadium; Attendance: 9,124; Referee: Lorant Varga |

| September 7 25 | Charleston Battery | 1–0 | Indy Eleven | Charleston, SC |
| 7:30 PM EDT | Nelson (yellow card) 26' (yellow-red card) 57'; Piggott 42'; Woodbine (yellow card) 90+2' | Report | Gabriel (yellow card) 90+6' | Stadium: MUSC Health Stadium; Attendance: 1,359; Referee: Sergii Demianchuk |

| September 11 26 | Indy Eleven | 2–0 | Ottawa Fury FC | Indianapolis, IN |
| 7:00 PM EDT | Ayoze 6', 55' | Report | Irving (yellow card) 9'; Gagnon-Laparé (yellow card) 30'; Boskovic (yellow card) 45'; Thiago (yellow card) 65' | Stadium: Lucas Oil Stadium; Attendance: 9,047; Referee: Ismir Pekmic |

| September 14 27 | Indy Eleven | 2–1 | Bethlehem Steel FC | Indianapolis, IN |
| 7:00 PM EDT | Ilić 57'; Ouimette (yellow card) 66'; Kelly 80', (yellow card) 88'; King (yellow card) 89' | Report | Scintu (yellow card) 27'; Zandi (yellow card) 73'; Ofeimu 75', (yellow card) 90+2'; Freese (yellow card) 80' | Stadium: Lucas Oil Stadium; Attendance: 12,103; Referee: Kevin Broadley |

| September 20 28 | Birmingham Legion | 1–0 | Indy Eleven | Birmingham, AL |
| 8:00 PM EDT | Wright 39'; Asiedu (yellow card) 77' | Report | Conner (red card) 53'; Ayoze (yellow card) 83' | Stadium: BBVA Compass Field; Referee: Greg Dopka |

| September 25 29 | Atlanta United 2 | 2–1 | Indy Eleven | Kennesaw, GA |
| 7:30 PM EDT | Campbell 24', (yellow card) 34'; Carleton (yellow card) 31', (goal) 61'; Wyke (yellow card) 38'; Decas (yellow card) 52'; Kissiedou (yellow card) 90+3' | Report | Hackshaw (yellow card) 9'; Barrett 36'; Gibson (yellow card) 43' | Stadium: Fifth Third Bank Stadium; Referee: Alejandro Mariscal |

| September 28 30 | Pittsburgh Riverhounds SC | 3–0 | Indy Eleven | Pittsburgh, PA |
| 7:00 PM EDT | Brett 15'; Forbes 40', 71' | Report | Ayoze (yellow card) 60'; Watson (yellow card) 73' | Stadium: Highmark Stadium; Attendance: 3,520; Referee: Malik Badawi |

| October 2 31 | Ottawa Fury FC | 1–0 | Indy Eleven | Ottawa, ON |
| 7:00 PM EDT | Attakora (yellow card) 11'; Haworth 16', (yellow card) 33'; Oliveira (yellow card) 45+2'; Gagnon-Laparé (yellow card) 61' | Report | Watson (red card) 60'; Ouimette (yellow card) 61' | Stadium: TD Place Stadium; Attendance: 3,145; Referee: Serge Topalian |

| October 5 32 | Indy Eleven | 3–0 | Memphis 901 | Indianapolis, IN |
| 7:00 PM EDT | Novoa 13'; Ouimette 22'; Pasher 77' | Report | Doyle (yellow card) 82' | Stadium: Lucas Oil Stadium; Attendance: 13,134; Referee: Elijio Arreguin |

| October 12 33 | Tampa Bay Rowdies | 1–1 | Indy Eleven | St. Petersburg, FL |
| 7:30 PM EDT | Guenzatti 45+6'; Mkosana (yellow card) 64' | Report | Barrett (yellow card) 64'; Kelly 72', (yellow card) 88' | Stadium: Al Lang Stadium; Attendance: 7,851; Referee: Lorant Varga |

| October 16 34 | Indy Eleven | 2–1 | Swope Park Rangers | Indianapolis, IN |
| 7:00 PM EDT | Osmond (yellow card) 23'; Conner (yellow card) 40'; Kelly 56', 67'; Hackshaw (yellow card) 61' | Report | Zé Pedro (yellow card) 16'; Vanacore-Decker (yellow card) 29'; Hernandez (yellow card) 37'; Harris 57' | Stadium: Lucas Oil Stadium; Attendance: 10,251; Referee: Chris Ruska |

==== USL Cup Playoffs ====
| October 26 Conference Quarterfinal | Indy Eleven | 1–0 | New York Red Bulls II | Indianapolis, IN |
| 4:00 p.m. EDT | Ouimette 27' | Report | | Stadium: Carroll Stadium; Attendance: 5,175; Referee: Michael Radchuk |

| November 2 Conference Semifinal | Nashville SC | 0–1 | Indy Eleven | Nashville, TN |
| 8:00 PM EDT | | Report | Pasher 59' | Stadium: Nissan Stadium; Attendance: 4,174; Referee: Elton García |

| November 9 Conference Final | Indy Eleven | 1–3 (a.e.t.) | Louisville City | Indianapolis, IN |
| 4:00 PM EDT | Barrett (yellow card) 45+1'; Pasher 67'; Ouimette (yellow card) 90+2'; Hackshaw (yellow card) 102' | Report | Williams (yellow card) 85'; Hoppenot 90+4'; Rasmussen 94'; Ownby (yellow card) 106'; Spencer 113' (pen.) | Stadium: Lucas Oil Stadium; Attendance: 7,171; Referee: Guido Gonzales, Jr. Assistant referees: Jeffrey Swartzel; Ryan Graves; Fourth official: Victor Rivas |

=== U.S. Open Cup ===
As a member of the USL Championship, Indy Eleven will enter the tournament in the second round, to be played May 14–15, 2019.

| May 15 Second round | Indy Eleven (Indiana) | 1–0 | (Michigan) Lansing Ignite | Indianapolis, IN |
| 7:00 PM EDT | Newton (red card) 21'; Enevoldsen (yellow card) 51', (goal) 57'; Watson (yellow card) 62'; Walker (yellow card) 88'; Kelly (yellow card) 90+2' | Report | Stoneman (yellow card) 62' | Stadium: Bud and Jackie Sellick Bowl; Attendance: 853; Referee: Adam Behrens |

| May 29 Third round | Pittsburgh Riverhounds SC (Pennsylvania) | 1–0 | (Indiana) Indy Eleven | Pittsburgh, PA |
| 7:00 pm EDT | James (yellow card) 43'; Greenspan (yellow card) 74'; Forbes 85' | Report | | Stadium: Highmark Stadium; Referee: Chris Ruska |

== Statistics ==
=== Appearances and goals ===
| No. | Pos | Nat | Player | Total | | USLC | | U.S. Open Cup | |
| No. | Pos | Nat | Player | Apps | Goals | Apps | Goals | Apps | Goals |
|---|---|---|---|---|---|---|---|---|---|
| 0 | GK | (United States) USA | Jordan Farr | 0 | 0 | 0 | 0 | 0 | 0 |
| 1 | GK | (United States) USA | Evan Newton | 8 | 0 | 8 | 0 | 0 | 0 |
| 2 | DF | (Brazil) BRA | Lucas Farias | 1 | 0 | 0+1 | 0 | 0 | 0 |
| 3 | DF | (England) ENG | Macauley King | 6 | 1 | 6 | 1 | 0 | 0 |
| 4 | MF | (United States) USA | Tyler Gibson | 8 | 1 | 8 | 1 | 0 | 0 |
| 5 | DF | (Australia) AUS | Mitch Osmond | 0 | 0 | 0 | 0 | 0 | 0 |
| 7 | DF | (Spain) ESP | Ayoze | 6 | 0 | 6 | 0 | 0 | 0 |
| 8 | MF | (England) ENG | Matt Watson | 8 | 0 | 3+5 | 0 | 0 | 0 |
| 9 | FW | (United States) USA | Eugene Starikov | 3 | 0 | 2+1 | 0 | 0 | 0 |
| 10 | FW | (Denmark) DEN | Thomas Enevoldsen | 8 | 2 | 8 | 2 | 0 | 0 |
| 14 | FW | (Serbia) SRB | Ilija Ilić | 1 | 0 | 1 | 0 | 0 | 0 |
| 15 | MF | (Trinidad and Tobago) TTO | Neveal Hackshaw | 8 | 2 | 8 | 2 | 0 | 0 |
| 17 | FW | (Jamaica) JAM | Dane Kelly | 8 | 4 | 8 | 4 | 0 | 0 |
| 18 | FW | (Senegal) SEN | Alioune Diakhate | 6 | 0 | 0+6 | 0 | 0 | 0 |
| 19 | MF | (United States) USA | Kenney Walker | 5 | 0 | 3+2 | 0 | 0 | 0 |
| 20 | DF | (Canada) CAN | Karl Ouimette | 4 | 0 | 3+1 | 0 | 0 | 0 |
| 23 | MF | (Canada) CAN | Tyler Pasher | 7 | 1 | 5+2 | 1 | 0 | 0 |
| 29 | DF | (Ireland) EIR | Paddy Barrett | 7 | 0 | 7 | 0 | 0 | 0 |
Players who left Indy during the season:
| 6 | MF | (Germany) GER | Nico Matern | 6 | 0 | 5+1 | 0 | 0 | 0 |
| 21 | DF | (United States) USA | Alex Crognale | 6 | 0 | 6 | 0 | 0 | 0 |
| 24 | GK | (United States) USA | Mario Perez | 0 | 0 | 0 | 0 | 0 | 0 |
| 25 | MF | (South Korea) KOR | Do-heon Kim | 2 | 0 | 0+2 | 0 | 0 | 0 |
| 27 | FW | (United States) USA | Joshua Penn | 3 | 0 | 1+2 | 0 | 0 | 0 |

Source: Indy stats

=== Disciplinary record ===
| No. | Pos. | Name | USLC | | U.S. Open Cup | | Total | |
| No. | Pos. | Name | Yellow card | Red card | Yellow card | Red card | Yellow card | Red card |
|---|---|---|---|---|---|---|---|---|
| 3 | DF | (England) Macauley King | 1 | 0 | 0 | 0 | 1 | 0 |
| 4 | MF | (United States) Tyler Gibson | 1 | 0 | 0 | 0 | 1 | 0 |
| 6 | MF | (Germany) Nico Matern | 1 | 0 | 0 | 0 | 1 | 0 |
| 7 | DF | (Spain) Ayoze | 1 | 0 | 0 | 0 | 1 | 0 |
| 15 | MF | (Trinidad and Tobago) Neveal Hackshaw | 1 | 0 | 0 | 0 | 1 | 0 |
| 17 | FW | (Jamaica) Dane Kelly | 1 | 0 | 0 | 0 | 1 | 0 |
| 18 | FW | (Senegal) Alioune Diakhate | 1 | 0 | 0 | 0 | 1 | 0 |
| 29 | DF | (Republic of Ireland) Paddy Barrett | 1 | 1 | 0 | 0 | 1 | 1 |
Players who left Indy during the season:
| 21 | DF | (United States) Alex Crognale | 1 | 0 | 0 | 0 | 1 | 0 |

Source: Indy stats

=== Clean sheets ===
| No. | Name | USLC | U.S. Open Cup | Total | Games Played | | |
|---|---|---|---|---|---|---|---|
| No. | Name | 0 | (United States) Jordan Farr | 0 | 0 | 0 | 0 |
| 1 | (United States) Evan Newton | 4 | 0 | 4 | 8 | | |
| 24 | (United States) Mario Perez | 0 | 0 | 0 | 0 | | |

Source: Indy stats

== Transfers ==
=== In ===
| Pos. | Player | Transferred from | Fee/notes | Date | Source |
|---|---|---|---|---|---|
| FW | (Serbia) Ilija Ilić | (United States) Louisville City | Terms of the contract were undisclosed. | Dec 3, 2018 | |
| DF | (Republic of Ireland) Paddy Barrett | (United States) FC Cincinnati | Terms of the contract were undisclosed. | Dec 5, 2018 | |
| MF | (United States) Tyler Gibson | (United States) FC Cincinnati | Terms of the contract were undisclosed. | Dec 5, 2018 | |
| MF | (United States) Kenney Walker | (United States) FC Cincinnati | Terms of the contract were undisclosed. | Dec 5, 2018 | |
| MF | (Trinidad and Tobago) Neveal Hackshaw | (United States) Charleston Battery | Terms of the contract were undisclosed. | Dec 13, 2018 | |
| GK | (United States) Evan Newton | (United States) FC Cincinnati | Terms of the contract were undisclosed. | Jan 8, 2019 | |
| DF | (England) Macauley King | (United States) Young Harris Mountain Lions | Terms of the contract were undisclosed. | Jan 10, 2019 | |
| FW | (Jamaica) Dane Kelly | (United States) D.C. United | Terms of the contract were undisclosed. | Jan 16, 2019 | |
| FW | (Denmark) Thomas Enevoldsen | (United States) Orange County SC | Terms of the contract were undisclosed. | Jan 29, 2019 | |
| DF | (Brazil) Lucas Farias | (Brazil) São Bento | Terms of the contract were undisclosed. | Feb 7, 2019 | |
| FW | (United States) Joshua Penn | (United States) Chicago Sockers FC | Signed to a USL Academy contract. | Feb 21, 2019 | |
| GK | (United States) Mario Perez | (United States) Indiana Fire Academy | Signed to a USL Academy contract. | Feb 21, 2019 | |
| MF | (South Korea) Do-heon Kim | (Malaysia) Negeri Sembilan | Terms of the contract were undisclosed. | Mar 5, 2019 | |
| FW | (Senegal) Alioune Diakhate | (Spain) C.D. Oller | Terms of the contract were undisclosed. | Mar 6, 2019 | |
| DF | (Australia) Mitch Osmond | (United States) Rio Grande RedStorm | Terms of the contract were undisclosed. | Mar 6, 2019 | |

=== Loan in ===
| Pos. | Player | Parent club | Length/Notes | Beginning | End | Source |
|---|---|---|---|---|---|---|
| DF | (United States) Alex Crognale | (United States) Columbus Crew SC | Duration of the 2019 USL Championship season. | Mar 15, 2019 | May 11, 2019 | |

=== Out ===
| Pos. | Player | Transferred to | Fee/notes | Date | Source |
|---|---|---|---|---|---|
| MF | (Ghana) Amass Amankona | (United States) Richmond Kickers | Contract option declined. Signed for Richmond on Jan 4, 2019. | Oct 21, 2018 | |
| FW | (United States) Justin Braun | | Contract expired. Retired. | Oct 21, 2018 | |
| DF | (Brazil) Reiner Ferreira | (Brazil) Boa Esporte | Contract expired. Signed for Boa on Jan 5, 2019. | Oct 21, 2018 | |
| MF | (Venezuela) Juan Guerra | | Contract expired. Retired. | Oct 21, 2018 | |
| MF | (Trinidad and Tobago) Nathan Lewis | (United States) Lansing Ignite | Contract option declined. Signed for Lansing on Jan 5, 2019. | Oct 21, 2018 | |
| MF | (United States) Dylan Mares | (United States) Miami FC | Contract expired. Signed for Miami on Jan 16, 2019. | Oct 21, 2018 | |
| FW | (United States) Jack McInerney | (United States) Oakland Roots | Contract expired. Signed for Oakland on Jul 24, 2019. | Oct 21, 2018 | |
| DF | (Trinidad and Tobago) Carlyle Mitchell | (Trinidad and Tobago) St. Ann's Rangers | Contract expired. Signed for St. Ann's in April 2019. | Oct 21, 2018 | |
| MF | (United States) Seth Moses | (United States) Fresno FC | Contract option declined. Signed for Fresno on Mar 6, 2019. | Oct 21, 2018 | |
| MF | (United States) Brad Ring | | Contract expired. Retired. | Oct 21, 2018 | |
| DF | (United States) Brad Rusin | | Contract expired. Retired. | Oct 21, 2018 | |
| FW | (Lebanon) Soony Saad | (Lebanon) Al Ansar | Contract expired. Signed for Ansar on Jan 18, 2019. | Oct 21, 2018 | |
| MF | (United States) Zach Steinberger | (United States) Tampa Bay Rowdies | Contract option declined. Signed for Tampa Bay on Dec 5, 2018. | Oct 21, 2018 | |
| DF | (United States) Kevin Venegas | (United States) New York Cosmos | Contract expired. Signed for New York on Feb 11, 2019. | Oct 21, 2018 | |

=== Loan out ===
| Pos. | Player | Loanee club | Length/Notes | Beginning | End | Source |
|---|---|---|---|---|---|---|
| MF | (United States) Ben Speas | (United States) North Carolina FC | Duration of the 2019 USL Championship season. | Jan 24, 2019 | | |

== Awards ==
=== USLC Team of the Week ===
| Week | Starters | Bench | Opponent(s) | Link |
|---|---|---|---|---|
| 2 | (United States) Kenney Walker | | Charlotte Independence | |
| 4 | (Spain) Ayoze | | Hartford Athletic | |
| 7 | (Jamaica) Dane Kelly | (Canada) Tyler Pasher | Swope Park Rangers; Bethlehem Steel FC | |
| 9 | (United States) Evan Newton | | Tampa Bay Rowdies; North Carolina FC | |

=== USLC Player of the Week ===
| Week | Player | Opponent(s) | Link |
|---|---|---|---|
| 7 | (Jamaica) Dane Kelly | Swope Park Rangers; Bethlehem Steel FC | |
| 9 | (United States) Evan Newton | Tampa Bay Rowdies; North Carolina FC | |

== Kits ==
| Home | Away |

| Type | Shirt | Shorts | Socks | First appearance / Record |
|---|---|---|---|---|
| Home | Blue | Blue | Blue | Match 3 vs. Hartford / 2–2–1 |
| Away | White | White | White | Match 1 vs. Saint Louis / 2–0–1 |

== See also ==
- Indy Eleven
- 2019 in American soccer
- 2019 USL Championship season
