= Tyler Pasher =

Canadian soccer player (born 1994)

Personal information
- Full name: Tyler Geoffrey Pasher
- Date of birth: 27 April 1994 (age 32)
- Place of birth: Elmira, Ontario, Canada
- Height: 5 ft 9 in (1.75 m)
- Positions: Forward; winger

Team information
- Current team: Birmingham Legion
- Number: 15

Youth career
- 2001–2009: Woolwich Soccer Association
- 2003–2010: Newcastle United
- 2010–2012: Toronto FC

Senior career*
Years	Team	Apps	(Gls)
2013	PS Kemi	22	(11)
2014	Lansing United	10	(3)
2015	Pittsburgh Riverhounds	21	(2)
2016	Swope Park Rangers	28	(5)
2016	→ Sporting Kansas City (loan)	0	(0)
2017	Sporting Kansas City	1	(0)
2017	→ Swope Park Rangers (loan)	27	(0)
2018–2020	Indy Eleven	57	(22)
2021–2022	Houston Dynamo	36	(6)
2022	New York Red Bulls	0	(0)
2023–	Birmingham Legion	91	(15)

International career^{‡}
2011	Canada U17	0	(0)
2012–2013	Canada U20	0	(0)
2021	Canada	2	(0)
- * Club domestic league appearances and goals as of November 2, 2026 ‡ National team caps and goals as of 18 July 2021

Tyler Pasher (born 27 April 1994) is a Canadian professional soccer player who plays as a forward for Birmingham Legion in the USL Championship.

== Club career ==
=== Youth ===
Pasher became a member of the Woolwich Soccer Association, of which his father Jeff was president, at age 6. He trained with English club Newcastle United's academy on multiple occasions throughout his youth. The first time he travelled to Newcastle as a schoolboy, he stepped right into training with the academy, something that no other Canadian had ever done.

Pasher originally made contact with Newcastle through a local coach and his son, David Edgar, a fellow Canadian who was also at Newcastle. Between the ages of 9 and 16, Pasher trained with the club during his two-week school break each March and for two months each summer.

He played for the academy between the ages of 9 and 13 before being part of the first team reserves between age 14 and 16. A combination of UK work permit difficulties, injury, and wishing to return home to Canada prompted Pasher to leave the club, at which time he joined the TFC Academy in the Canadian Soccer League.

=== PS Kemi Kings ===
Pasher left Toronto FC and signed a 1+2 contract with PS Kemi Kings in the Kakkonen, the third tier of Finnish football, on 5 April 2013. He made his debut for PS Kemi on 24 April 2013 in a 2–0 defeat to VPS in a Finnish Cup match.

On 27 April he made his first league appearance for the club in a 2–1 win over Kerho 07. Pasher scored his first goal for Kemi on 19 May in a 2–2 draw with Vasa IFK. Pasher made 22 appearances and scored 11 goals in the regular season to help PS Kemi win the Kakkonen Pohjoinen (Northern) Division and advanced to the promotion playoff series, where they lost 2–0 on aggregate to HIFK, with Pasher appearing in both legs.

Tyler is an attacking full-back with an educated left foot who provides great service whipping balls in from the left side. He's got grit and good experience for his age through playing with the Canadian national youth teams. He's got some work to do, but we're expecting some big things from him.

— Riverhounds head coach Mark Steffens

=== Lansing United ===
After leaving PS Kemi, Pasher trained with Lansing United of the National Premier Soccer League for most of the season but was able to appear in only a limited number of matches because of contractual complications with his former club. Pasher was home for the summer and decided to join the club, of which a good friend was assistant coach, to stay fit while waiting to be signed by a professional club. At that time, it was believed that Pasher would return to Toronto FC after impressing head coach Ryan Nelsen. About the way in which Pasher ended up with the club, Lansing head coach Eric Rudland described it as, "[He] fell into our lap through a comedy of errors."

In total, Pasher made ten appearances during his time with the club, tallying three goals and six assists while also battling injuries after deciding to stay with the club for the season. Following the season, Pasher was named to the NPSL's Supporters' XI team after helping Lansing earn the NPSL Great Lakes West conference title in the club's inaugural season.

=== Pittsburgh Riverhounds ===
In January 2015 Pasher signed with the Pittsburgh Riverhounds of the United Soccer League, the third tier of the United States soccer league system, after trialing with the club during preseason. On 8 April 2015 it was announced that Pasher had received his international transfer clearance and would be available for the Riverhounds' third match of the season, an away fixture against Saint Louis FC on 11 April. Pasher made his Riverhounds debut as a starter in the match, a 1–1 draw.

He scored his first league goal for the Riverhounds on 25 April, the final goal of a 5–1 victory over Toronto FC II. Pasher finished the season with 21 league appearances for the Riverhounds while scoring two goals, helping Pittsburgh finish 5th in the Eastern Conference and qualify for the playoffs. He did not appear in the Riverhounds playoff game, a 4–2 loss to New York Red Bulls II in extra time.

=== Swope Park Rangers ===
Pasher signed with USL side Swope Park Rangers on 2 March 2016. He made his Rangers debut on 26 March in 2–1 win over Portland Timbers 2. Pasher scored his first two goals for Swope Park on 14 May against Tulsa Roughnecks FC. In August 2016, Sporting Kansas City, Swope Park's MLS affiliate, announced that they had signed Pasher on a short-term loan to play in the 2016–17 CONCACAF Champions League against Central FC. He made his CCL debut in a 1–2 defeat to the Vancouver Whitecaps on 13 September 2016.

He was called up to Sporting's squad again for the tournament in October 2016 for the final match of the group stage, the return fixture against Central FC. On 18 September Pasher had a goal and assist to help Swope Park defeat OKC Energy 3–0. He ended the regular season with 5 goals and 1 assist from 24 appearances, helping the Rangers finish 4th in the Western Conference and qualify for the playoffs. Pasher played every minute of Swope Park's 4 playoff games and had 3 assists to help the Rangers reach the final, where they lost 5–1 to New York Red Bulls II.

=== Sporting Kansas City ===
After a successful 2016 season, Pasher signed a first-team contract with Sporting Kansas City on 2 December 2016. He made his MLS debut on 20 May 2017, getting the start in a 2–0 loss to the Vancouver Whitecaps. Pasher spent most of 2017 on loan with SKC's USL affiliate, Swope Park Rangers.

He 3 assists from 24 appearances in the regular season for the Rangers, helping Swope Park qualify for the playoffs after finishing 4th in the Western Conference. Pasher played 3 times in the playoffs to help the Rangers reach the final. He would not appear in the final, a 1–0 loss to Louisville City. On 27 November, upon conclusion of the 2017 season, Sporting KC announced they would not exercise Pasher's option for the 2018 season.

On 10 December 2017 Pasher's MLS rights was traded by Kansas City, along with the rights to Kévin Oliveira and a second-round selection in the 2018 MLS SuperDraft, to Atlanta United in exchange for goalkeeper Alexander Tambakis, the MLS rights to forward Kenwyne Jones, and a fourth-round selection in the 2021 MLS SuperDraft. Pasher did not sign with Atlanta.

=== Indy Eleven ===
On 7 February 2018, Pasher joined Indy Eleven of the United Soccer League. He made his debut for Indy on 24 March in a 1–0 win over the Richmond Kickers. On 7 April he scored his first goal for Indy to give them a 1–0 win over North Carolina FC. Pasher ended the 2018 season with 1 goal and 1 assist in 10 appearances in the regular season as Indy Eleven finished 7th in the Eastern Conference. Pasher did not appear in Indy's playoff game.

On 20 April, Pasher scored his first goal of the 2019 season to help Indy defeat Bethlehem Steel 3–0. He scored in the 84th minute on 18 May to give Indy a 1–0 win over Charleston Battery. Pasher scored 5 goals and had 1 assist during a 6 match stretch in June, including a game-winning goal in the 89th minute on 15 June in a 2–1 win against Loudoun United, helping Indy record 5 wins and 1 draw during the month. Pasher ended the regular season with 32 appearances, 11 goals, and 4 assists as he helped Indy finish 3rd in the Eastern Conference. He was named to the USL Championship Team of the Week seven times during the season. In the playoffs, Pasher scored twice in 3 appearances as he helped Indy reach the conference finals, where they lost 3–1 to Louisville City in extra time.

Pasher and Indy Eleven opened the 2020 season on 7 March by beating Memphis 901 4–2, with Pasher scoring twice and adding an assist during the game. Soon after, the USL Championship season was paused due to the COVID-19 pandemic. Indy returned to play on 11 July, with Pasher scoring once in a 2–0 win against Saint Louis FC. In Indy Eleven's next game, Pasher scored again, helping Indy to a 2–1 win over Sporting Kansas City II.

On 22 July, Pasher scored seven minutes into stoppage time to give Indy a 1–0 win against the Pittsburgh Riverhounds and to bring his scoring streak to 6 straight games (including Indy's final 2 games of the 2019 playoffs). For this goal, Pasher picked up the ball slightly behind midfield, dribbled down the right flank, cut inside and shot it into the top left corner from over 25 yards out. Pasher finished the shortened regular season with 10 goals and 2 assists in 15 appearances, however Indy failed to qualify for the playoffs. His goal tally was tied for the 5th highest in the league. Pasher was named to the 2020 All-League Second Team, was named the USL Championship Player of the Month for July, and made the Team of the Week four times.

=== Houston Dynamo ===
On 14 January 2021, Pasher returned to Major League Soccer, signing with the Houston Dynamo. He made his Dynamo debut in their season-opening 2–1 victory against the San Jose Earthquakes on 17 April, getting an assist on Maxi Urruti's game-winning goal. In Pasher's third game with the Dynamo on 1 May, he scored his first goal for the club, netting the equalizer in a 1–1 draw with Los Angeles FC. He missed the next 3 games due to a hip injury.

On 4 August, Pasher scored in a 3–2 loss to Austin FC, but left the game in the first half due to an ankle injury. He missed Houston's next 4 games. Pasher returned and played in the Dynamo's next 2 games before suffering another injury, keeping him out for 4 games. Pasher ended the season with 4 goals and 3 assists in 19 appearances. He was hampered by injuries for the back half of the season, making 9 appearances, just 1 of them a start, and picking up no goals or assists over the final 17 games. It was a disappointing season for the Dynamo as a team, finishing bottom of the Western Conference, failing to qualify for the playoffs. In December 2021, Houston picked up Pasher's contract option, keeping him at the club through the 2022 MLS season.

On 19 March 2022 Pasher scored in the 90th minute to give Houston a 1–1 draw against the Colorado Rapids. He ended his second season in Houston with 2 goals and 1 assist in 17 MLS appearances, plus 3 Open Cup appearances. On 5 August Pasher was waived by Houston.

=== New York Red Bulls ===
On 10 August 2022, Pasher signed with the New York Red Bulls. He was released on 2 September, having failed to make an appearance.

=== Birmingham Legion ===
On 12 December 2022, it was announced that Pasher had signed with USL Championship side Birmingham Legion from the 2023 season. Pasher made his debut for Birmingham in a 1–1 draw at home to the Pittsburgh Riverhounds on March 11. Pasher scored his first goal for the club on March 17, netting two goals on either side of half-time in a 3–2 home victory over FC Tulsa.

Pasher also featured for Birmingham as they progressed to the quarterfinals of the 2023 Lamar Hunt U.S. Open Cup before losing 1–0 to Inter Miami CF. Pasher ended the 2023 season with 5 goals and 3 assists in 25 appearances, including 16 league starts. Pasher played in both of Birmingham's 2023 USL Championship Playoffs matches, including a 3-0 conference quarterfinal victory over the Tampa Bay Rowdies and the 2-1 conference semifinal defeat to the Charleston Battery.

== International career ==
In 2005, Pasher was one of the final 140 players narrowed down to represent Canada at the Under-12 level in the Danone Nations Cup in France. However, he was not selected for the final squad. At that time, Tyler was invited back in April 2006 for tryouts for the next edition of the tournament.

Pasher received his first national team call up at any level for a pair of U17 friendlies against Mexico in Morelia in April 2011 in preparation for the upcoming U17 World Cup. He came on as a 69th-minute substitute in the second match, a 0–3 defeat. He was then named to Canada's final U17 squad for the 2011 FIFA U-17 World Cup in Mexico but withdrew due to a concussion.

In July 2012 he was named to Canada's U20 squad for a training camp and two friendlies in Mexico. In 2013, he was then included in Canada's U20 squad for the 2013 Francophone Games in Nice. He went on to appear in two of Canada's three matches in the tournament.

In May 2014, head coach Benito Floro called up Pasher to the senior squad for the first time for a training camp and friendlies against Moldova and Bulgaria in Austria but he once again withdrew because of injury. He was called up to the senior squad again, this time as an injury replacement for Sam Adekugbe and André Hainault, in March 2015 for friendlies against Puerto Rico and Guatemala. He didn't appear in either match, but he made the bench against Puerto Rico.

In June 2021 after a hot start with the Houston Dynamo, Pasher was named to Canada's 60-man provisional squad for the 2021 CONCACAF Gold Cup. On July 1, he was confirmed as part of the final 23-man squad. At the Gold Cup, he made his senior debut as a substitute for Tajon Buchanan, in a 4–1 group stage victory over Haiti. He made 2 appearances at the Gold Cup, both in the group stage, as Canada reached the semifinals, where they lost 2–1 to Mexico.

== Career statistics ==
As of November 15, 2026

Club	Season	League			Cup (Note: Includes the Finnish Cup and U.S. Open Cup)		Playoffs (Note: Includes the Kakkonen promotion playoffs, NPSL Playoffs, USL Playoffs, and MLS Cup Playoffs)		Continental (Note: Appearance in the CONCACAF Champions League)		Total	
Club	Season	Division	Apps	Goals	Apps	Goals	Apps	Goals	Apps	Goals	Apps	Goals
PS Kemi	2013	Kakkonen	22	11	1	0	2	0	—		25	11
Lansing United	2014	NPSL	10	3	—		0	0	—		10	3
Pittsburgh Riverhounds	2015	USL Championship	21	2	2	0	0	0	—		23	2
Swope Park Rangers	2016	USL Championship	24	5	—		4	0	—		28	5
Sporting Kansas City (loan)	2016	MLS	0	0	0	0	0	0	1	0	1	0
Sporting Kansas City	2017	MLS	1	0	0	0	0	0	—		1	0
Sporting Kansas City	Total		1	0	0	0	0	0	1	0	2	0
Swope Park Rangers (loan)	2017	USL Championship	24	0	—		3	0	—		27	0
Indy Eleven	2018	USL Championship	10	1	–		–		—		10	1
Indy Eleven	2019	USL Championship	32	11	2	0	3	2	—		37	13
Indy Eleven	2020	USL Championship	15	10	–		—		—		15	10
Indy Eleven	Total		57	22	2	0	3	2	0	0	62	24
Houston Dynamo	2021	MLS	19	4	0	0	0	0	—		19	4
Houston Dynamo	2022	MLS	17	2	3	0	0	0	—		20	2
Houston Dynamo	Total		36	6	3	0	0	0	0	0	39	6
New York Red Bulls	2022	MLS	0	0	0	0	0	0	—		0	0
Birmingham Legion	2023	USL Championship	20	4	4	1	2	0	0	0	26	5
Birmingham Legion	2024	USL Championship	26	4	2	2	0	0	0	0	28	6
Birmingham Legion	2025	USL Championship	21	2	0	0	5	0	0	0	26	2
Birmingham Legion	2026	USL Championship	24	5	0	0	3	0	0	0	27	5
Birmingham Legion	Total		91	15	6	3	10	0	0	0	107	18
Career total			286	64	14	3	22	2	1	0	323	68

=== International ===
As of July 18, 2021

Canada
Year	Apps	Goals
2021	2	0
Total	2	0

== Honours ==
PS Kemi

- Kakkonen Pohjoinen Champion: 2013

Lansing United

- NPSL Great Lakes West Conference Champion: 2014

Individual

- NPSL Supporters' XI team: 2014
- USL Championship All-League Second Team: 2020
- USL Championship Player of the Month: July 2020
