= Brad Ring =

American soccer player (born 1987)

Personal information
- Date of birth: April 7, 1987 (age 39)
- Place of birth: Rockford, Illinois, United States
- Height: 5 ft 10 in (1.78 m)
- Position: Defensive midfielder

Youth career
- 2005–2008: Indiana Hoosiers

Senior career*
Years	Team	Apps	(Gls)
2006	Chicago Fire Premier	9	(2)
2007–2008	Princeton 56ers		
2008	Chicago Fire Premier	0	(0)
2010–2013	San Jose Earthquakes	37	(0)
2013	Portland Timbers	1	(0)
2014–2018	Indy Eleven	109	(4)

International career
2006	United States U20	5	(0)
- * Club domestic league appearances and goals

Brad Ring (born April 7, 1987) is an American former professional soccer player who played as a defensive midfielder for Indy Eleven and San Jose Earthquakes.

== Career ==
=== College and amateur ===
Ring attended Guilford High School and played four years of college soccer for the Indiana University Hoosiers. He was a Big Ten All-Freshman Team selection, was a first-team All-Big Ten pick, a first-team NSCAA/adidas Great Lakes All-Region and second-team All-America selection, a Big Ten All-Tournament Team selection, and a semifinalist for the MAC Hermann Trophy as a junior in 2007, and was a third-team NSCAA All-American, an NSCAA Scholar All-American, and a member of the Academic All-Big Ten and NSCAA All-Great Lakes Region first-team as a senior while being named a MAC Hermann Trophy semifinalist for the second consecutive season.

During his college years Ring also played for Chicago Fire Premier in the USL Premier Development League and Princeton 56ers in the National Premier Soccer League.

=== Professional ===
Ring was drafted in the second round (17th overall) of the 2009 MLS SuperDraft by the San Jose Earthquakes. He signed with the club a year later after sitting out the 2009 season with a hip injury.

He made his professional debut on April 24, 2010, against Chivas USA. He was traded by San Jose on Sept. 5, 2013 to the Portland Timbers. He appeared in one match with the Timbers, playing one minute of the match against Toronto on Sept. 7, 2013. During that minute the Timbers scored, giving Ring the highest team-goals-per-minute (1 goal/min) of any Timbers player ever.

In January 2014, Ring returned to his Indiana roots by signing a two-year contract with Indy Eleven in the North American Soccer League (NASL).

Ring extended his contract with Indy Eleven on 27 January 2017.

Ring announced his retirement from professional soccer on February 8, 2019.

== Career statistics ==
As of September 22, 2018

Appearances and goals by club, season and competition
Club	Season	League			Cup		Continental		Playoffs		Total	
Club	Season	Division	Apps	Goals	Apps	Goals	Apps	Goals	Apps	Goals	Apps	Goals
San Jose Earthquakes	2010	MLS	11	0	0	0	–		0	0	11	0
San Jose Earthquakes	2011	MLS	21	0	0	0	–		–		21	0
San Jose Earthquakes	2012	MLS	2	0	1	0	–		0	0	3	0
San Jose Earthquakes	2013	MLS	3	0	1	0	1	0	–		5	0
San Jose Earthquakes	Total		37	0	2	0	1	0	0	0	40	0
Portland Timbers	2013	MLS	1	0	0	0	–		0	0	1	0
Indy Eleven	2014	NASL	12	1	1	0	–		–		13	1
Indy Eleven	2015	NASL	21	1	0	0	–		–		21	1
Indy Eleven	2016	NASL	27	1	1	0	–		2	0	30	1
Indy Eleven	2017	NASL	29	1	1	0	–		–		30	1
Indy Eleven	2018	USL	20	0	1	0	–		0	0	21	0
Indy Eleven	Total		109	4	4	0	0	0	2	0	115	4
Career total			147	4	6	0	1	0	2	0	156	4
