= Gerardo Torrado =

Mexican footballer (born 1979)

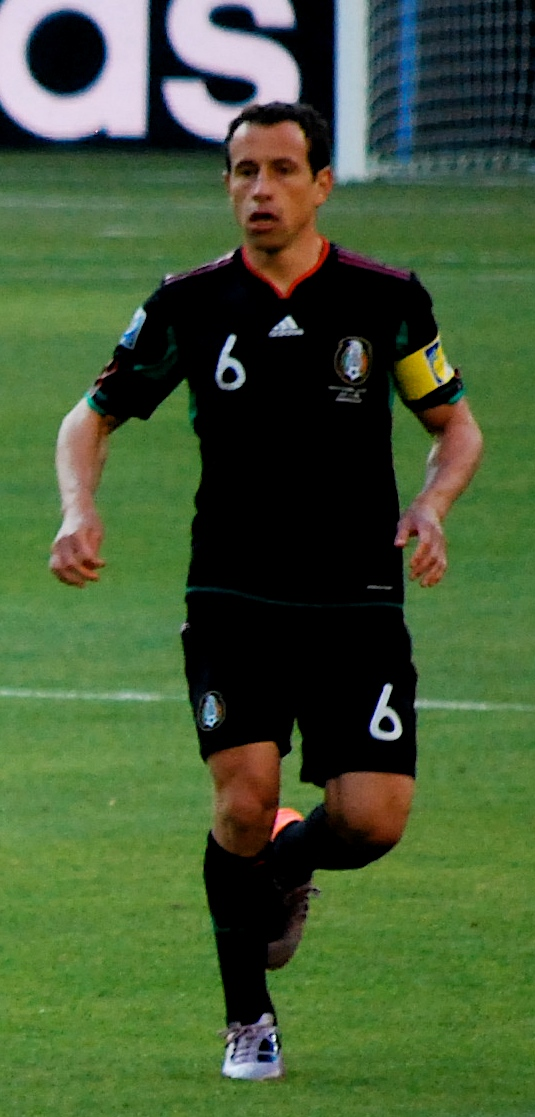
- Torrado with Mexico at the 2010 FIFA World Cup

Personal information
- Full name: Gerardo Torrado Díez de Bonilla
- Date of birth: 30 April 1979 (age 47)
- Place of birth: Mexico City, Mexico
- Height: 1.76 m (5 ft 9 in)
- Position: Defensive midfielder

Senior career*
Years	Team	Apps	(Gls)
1997–2000	UNAM	44	(1)
2000–2001	Tenerife	36	(1)
2001–2002	Poli Ejido	32	(0)
2002–2004	Sevilla	40	(0)
2004–2005	Racing Santander	19	(0)
2005–2016	Cruz Azul	325	(12)
2016–2017	Indy Eleven	40	(2)
Total		536	(16)

International career
1999	Mexico U20	5	(0)
1999–2013	Mexico	144	(5)

Managerial career
- 2023: PIO FC (KL)
Medal record
Men's football
Representing Mexico
FIFA Confederations Cup
Winner	1999 Mexico
CONCACAF Gold Cup
Winner	2009 United States
Winner	2011 United States
Runner-up	2007 United States
Copa América
Runner-up	2001 Colombia
Third place	1999 Paraguay
Third place	2007 Venezuela
- * Club domestic league appearances and goals

Gerardo Torrado Díez de Bonilla (born 30 April 1979) is a Mexican former professional footballer who played as a defensive midfielder.

Torrado represented Mexico at the 2002, 2006 and 2010 FIFA World Cups and has won three CONCACAF Gold Cup tournaments.

Torrado spent the majority of his club career with Cruz Azul, whom he captained to CONCACAF Champions League success in 2014.

== Club career ==
=== Spain ===
Born in Mexico City, Torrado began his career with UNAM in 1997. After débuting in 1997, Torrado was bought three years later by Spanish club CD Tenerife where he played almost the whole season. The following year he was transferred to Poli Ejido. He caught the eye of Spanish club Sevilla where he had success in his first season but an injury left him out for almost a full season. He was then transferred to Racing de Santander. He did not have much chance to play because of his reported differences with the coach. He was eventually forced to return to Mexico.

=== Cruz Azul ===
After a few years playing in Spain, he became a Cruz Azul player in 2005, débuting against Monarcas Morelia where he scored the two goals in the 2–0 win for Cruz Azul. He rapidly emerged as one of the most important players in the squad. An aggressive midfielder, Torrado has gotten many red and yellow cards in his career. He has captained the team since 2006, and has led the team to three league finals and a CONCACAF Champions League final in 2009, and on 26 April 2014 he became CONCACAF champion for the first time in his career with Cruz Azul.

=== Indy Eleven ===
On 8 June 2016, Torrado signed for NASL side Indy Eleven, extending his contract for the 2017 season on 26 January 2017.

Torrado retired on 30 October 2017 ending a 20-year career span.

== International career ==
=== Youth ===
Torrado made an impact when he represented Mexico at the 1999 FIFA World Youth Championship, which put the spotlight on him as a potential national team player.

=== Senior ===
Ever since his début in a friendly match against Argentina, he has become a mainstay in the national team. Torrado scored his first goal for Mexico in the 1999 Copa América against Peru, scoring with a stunning long-range shot in stoppage time which saved the game for Mexico. His goal ensured that the match ended 3–3 and Mexico then went on to win on penalties. Torrado has been in the Mexico squads for the 2002, 2006 and 2010 FIFA World Cup and was vice-captain for the 2010 tournament in South Africa, playing in all four of Mexico's matches as they were eliminated in the Round of 16 after losing 3–1 to Argentina.

== After retirement ==
Following his retirement as a footballer, on 24 August 2017, Guillermo Cantú announced Torrado as sporting director for the Mexican Football Federation. On 13 July 2022, Torrado was dismissed from his position following a string of disappointing results.

In December 2022, Torrado joined the newly established Kings League as the manager for Pio FC. On 1 January 2023, the team suffered a 5–0 loss to El Barrio during the league's inaugural match day.

== Career statistics ==
Appearances and goals by national team and year
National team	Year	Apps	Goals
Mexico	1999	12	1
Mexico	2000	8	0
Mexico	2001	10	0
Mexico	2002	7	1
Mexico	2003	0	0
Mexico	2004	6	0
Mexico	2005	7	0
Mexico	2006	9	0
Mexico	2007	19	2
Mexico	2008	11	0
Mexico	2009	15	2
Mexico	2010	17	0
Mexico	2011	14	0
Mexico	2012	2	0
Mexico	2013	9	0
Total		146	6

Scores and results list Mexico's goal tally first, score column indicates score after each Torrado goal.

List of international goals scored by Gerardo Torrado
No.	Date	Venue	Opponent	Score	Result	Competition
1	10 July 1999	Estadio Defensores del Chaco, Asunción, Paraguay	Peru	3–3	4–2 (p.s.o.)	1999 Copa América
2	9 June 2002	Miyagi Stadium, Rifu, Japan	Ecuador	2–1	2–1	2002 FIFA World Cup
3	2 June 2007	Estadio Alfonso Lastras, San Luis Potosí, Mexico	Iran	4–0	4–0	Friendly
4	8 July 2007	Estadio Monumental de Maturín, Maturín, Venezuela	Paraguay	2–0	6–0	2007 Copa América
5	12 July 2009	University of Phoenix Stadium, Glendale, United States	Guadeloupe	1–0	2–0	2009 CONCACAF Gold Cup
6	26 July 2009	Giants Stadium, East Rutherford, United States	United States	1–0	5–0	2009 CONCACAF Gold Cup

== Honours ==
Cruz Azul

- Copa MX: Clausura 2013
- CONCACAF Champions League: 2013–14

Indy Eleven

- Spring Champions: 2016

Mexico

- FIFA Confederations Cup: 1999
- CONCACAF Gold Cup: 2009, 2011

Individual

- Mexican Primera División Defensive Midfielder of the Tournament: Apertura 2009
- CONCACAF Gold Cup All-Tournament Team: 2009
- FIFA Club World Cup Top Scorer: 2014

== See also ==
- List of men's footballers with 100 or more international caps
