= David Goldsmith (footballer) =

English footballer and coach (born 1993)

Personal information
- Date of birth: 21 September 1993 (age 33)
- Place of birth: Bristol, England
- Position: Forward

Youth career
- 2008–2012: West Bromwich Albion
- 2012–2013: Nike Academy

College career
Years	Team	Apps	(Gls)
2013–2016	Butler Bulldogs	70	(41)

Senior career*
Years	Team	Apps	(Gls)
2014–2016	Michigan Bucks	35	(18)
2017	Indy Eleven	25	(3)
2018	Michigan Bucks	14	(8)
- * Club domestic league appearances and goals

David Goldsmith (born 21 September 1993) is an English former footballer who is a graduate assistant coach for college team the Butler Bulldogs.

== Career ==
=== College career ===
Goldsmith played four years of college soccer at Butler University between 2013 and 2016. He tallied 41 goals and 9 assists in 70 total appearances with the Bulldogs and was named Big East Male Scholar-Athlete of the Year in 2016.

While at college, Goldsmith also played three seasons with USL Premier Development League side Michigan Bucks.

=== Professional career ===
On 21 March 2017, it was announced that Goldsmith had signed for North American Soccer League club Indy Eleven. He made his professional debut on 30 April 2017, as a late substitute in a 1–1 draw with Jacksonville Armada.

=== International career ===
Goldsmith was called up to the Wales U19 training camp.
