= Tanner Thompson =

American soccer player (born 1994)

Personal information
- Date of birth: August 12, 1994 (age 32)
- Place of birth: Chicago, Illinois, United States
- Height: 1.70 m (5 ft 7 in)
- Position: Midfielder

College career
Years	Team	Apps	(Gls)
2013–2016	Indiana Hoosiers	83	(18)

Senior career*
Years	Team	Apps	(Gls)
2017	Indy Eleven	20	(1)

Managerial career
- 2022–: Indiana Hoosiers (assistant)
- * Club domestic league appearances and goals as of October 30, 2017

Tanner Thompson (born August 12, 1994) is an American former professional soccer player, who is currently an assistant coach for the Indiana Hoosiers men's soccer program.

== Career ==
=== Youth and college ===
Thompson attended the Indiana University for four years, where he was a 3x All American for the Hoosiers. With the Hoosiers, Thompsons scored 18 goals in 83 appearances, while also recording 19 assists.

He was named NSCAA First Team All-American twice (2014 & 2016), and NSCAA Third Team All-American once in 2015. Thompson was 2x Big Ten Conference Midfielder of the Year (2015 & 2016), and a 2x MAC-Hermann Trophy Semifinalist (2014 & 2016). He was also a 3x NSCAA First Team All-Midwest Region (2014–2016) and a part of the First Team All-Big Ten Conference Team on three occasions (2014, 2015, and 2016).

He was also nominated for the senior class award in 2016.

=== Professional ===
Thompson was drafted in the fourth round, 67th overall, in the 2017 MLS SuperDraft by Minnesota United on January 17, 2017. However, he wasn't signed by the club. Thompson later signed with NASL club Indy Eleven on March 21, 2017.

Thompson made his professional debut on March 25, 2017, in a 1–1 draw with San Francisco Deltas, where he also recorded his first goal.

== Personal ==
Tanner's young brother is fellow soccer player Tommy, who currently plays for San Jose Earthquakes in Major League Soccer. His father is former-United States international soccer player Gregg Thompson.
