= Nico Matern =

German footballer and futsal player

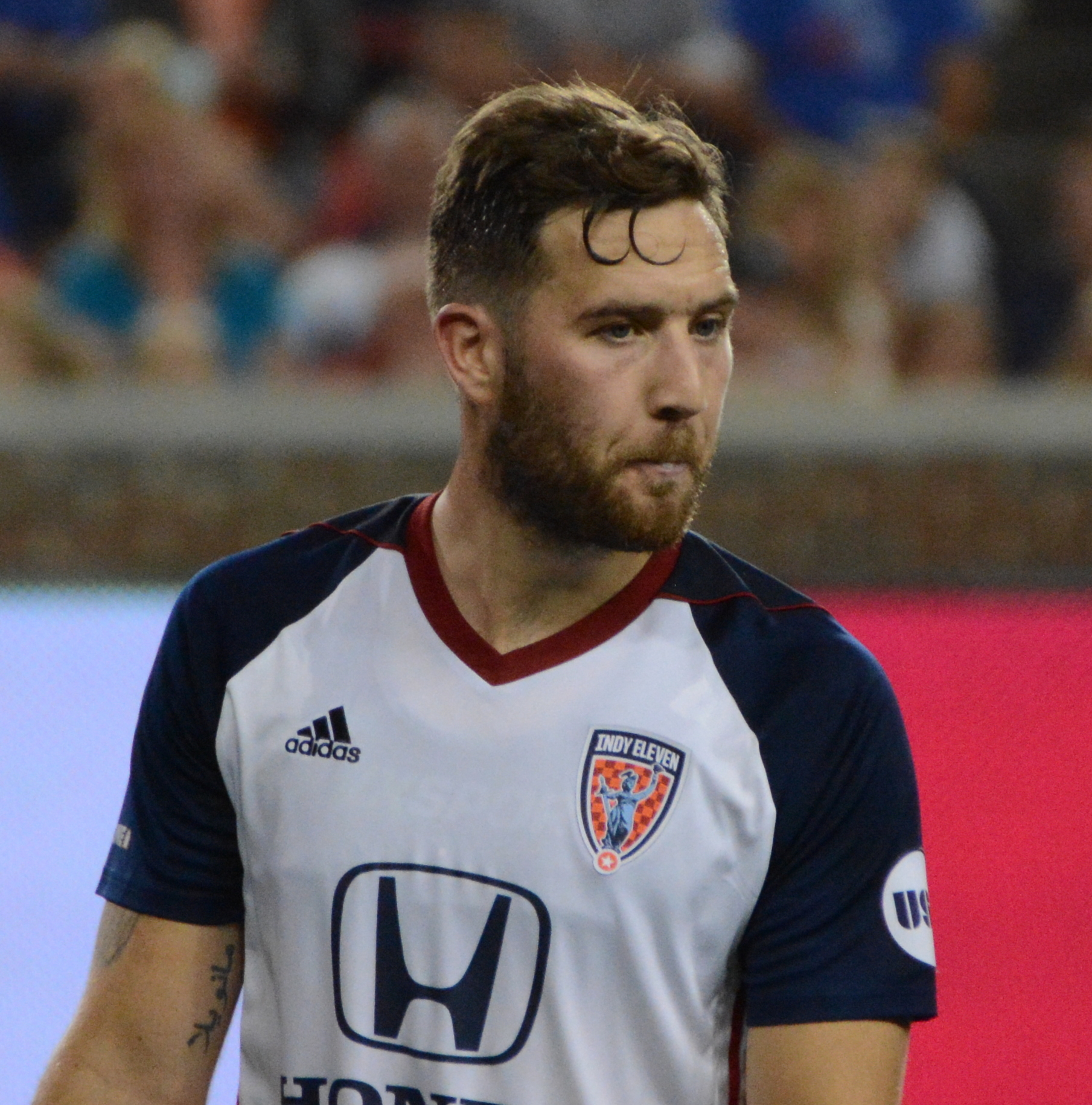
- Matern with Indy Eleven in 2018

Personal information
- Date of birth: 27 November 1992 (age 33)
- Place of birth: Buxtehude, Germany
- Height: 1.82 m (6 ft 0 in)
- Position: Midfielder

Team information
- Current team: Heeslinger SC
- Number: 7

Youth career
- 2008–2010: FC St. Pauli
- 2010–2011: Hallescher FC

College career
Years	Team	Apps	(Gls)
2017	Indiana Wesleyan Wildcats	21	(3)

Senior career*
Years	Team	Apps	(Gls)
2011–2012	Wuppertaler SV	1	(0)
2012–2014	SV Drochtersen/Assel	58	(8)
2014–2015	Hansa Rostock	1	(0)
2014–2015	Hansa Rostock II	25	(4)
2015–2016	Schönberg 95	25	(2)
2016–2017	Buxtehuder SV	29	(4)
2018–2019	Indy Eleven	32	(0)
2019–2021	VfB Oldenburg	29	(1)
2021–2022	FC Teutonia Ottensen	14	(1)
2022–2023	Atlas Delmenhorst	19	(0)
2023–	Heeslinger SC	13	(0)
- * Club domestic league appearances and goals as of 1 July 2023

Nico Matern (born 27 November 1992) is a German professional footballer who plays as a midfielder for Heeslinger SC. He played futsal for Hamburg Panthers.

== Career ==
In his youth, Matern played for FC St. Pauli and Hallescher FC. From the youth teams of Hallescher FC, he moved to Wuppertaler SV in the semi-professional Regionalliga West. He played his first and only game for Wuppertaler SV on 28 October 2011 under coach Hans-Günter Bruns in a 1–0 victory against the Bayer Leverkusen reserves.

After one season, he left Wuppertaler SV again and moved to SV Drochtersen/Assel in the Oberliga Niedersachsen. He debuted for Drochtersen/Assel on 3 August 2012 in a 3–0 victory against Lüneburger SK Hansa. His first goal for the team came in the 66th minute of a 17 November 2012 match against Lüneburger SK Hansa; it was the second out of four in what would be a shut-out victory for his club.

After two seasons, he moved to FC Hansa Rostock, where he spent much of his time playing for the reserve squad (Hansa Rostock II). His first game in the Oberliga Nordost for Hansa Rostock II took place on 3 August 2014, a 4–0 defeat against SV Altlüdersdorf. In the 15th minute of the following game on 8 August 2014, he scored his first goal for Hansa Rostock II, ultimately resulting in a 2–0 victory over FC Pommern Greifswald. Under coach Peter Vollmann, he made his professional debut with the first team on 6 September 2014, when he was subbed in at the 80th minute of a 1–0 defeat against Hallescher FC.

For the 2015–16 season, he moved to FC Schoenberg 95 where he debuted on 26 July 2015. In his first appearance, he scored what would be the lone goal of the match for either side in the 18th minute.

After a season, he left the FC Schoenberg 95 and moved to his hometown to play for Buxtehuder SV. He made his debut in the Oberliga Hamburg on 31 July 2016 in a 4–1 defeat against Niendorfer TSV.

In 2017, Matern left German club Buxtehuder SV to attend Indiana Wesleyan University in the United States and play for the Indiana Wesleyan Wildcats.

In 2018, he signed a two-year contract with the second-division club Indy Eleven in the United Soccer League. Matern was a regular contributor for Indy, starting in all 27 of his appearances that season.

Matern was one of just seven players on Indy's 2018 roster that returned for the 2019 season after a frenzy of new signings in the offseason. However, as of 30 March, he had not seen much playing time in 2019.
