= Craig Henderson =

New Zealand footballer (born 1987)

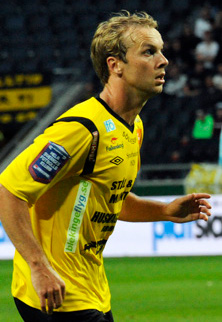

Personal information
- Full name: Craig Charles Glendinning Henderson
- Date of birth: 24 June 1987 (age 39)
- Place of birth: Lower Hutt, New Zealand
- Height: 1.78 m (5 ft 10 in)
- Position: Attacking midfielder

Youth career
- 1994–2002: Stokes Valley

College career
Years	Team	Apps	(Gls)
2006–2009	Dartmouth Big Green	50	(17)

Senior career*
Years	Team	Apps	(Gls)
2003–2004	Western Suburbs FC		
2004–2005	Team Wellington	7	(2)
2010–2014	Mjällby AIF	37	(7)
2014–2015	Stabæk	6	(1)
2015	→ Mjøndalen (loan)	7	(1)
2016–2017	GAIS	19	(0)
2017	Indy Eleven	18	(2)

International career^{‡}
2003	New Zealand U17		
2007	New Zealand U20	12	(2)
2006–2007	New Zealand U23	8	(1)
2013	New Zealand	2	(0)
- * Club domestic league appearances and goals as of 09:10, 8 April 2018 (UTC) ‡ National team caps and goals as of 20 November 2013

Craig Charles Glendinning Henderson (born 24 June 1987) is a New Zealand former footballer who played as a midfielder. His hometown is Stokes Valley, Lower Hutt. He attended Taita College, Lower Hutt where he was Head Boy, Dux and Sportsman of the Year in 2004.

== Career ==
=== Club ===
==== Move to Sweden ====
In August 2009, Henderson spent a week training with the Swedish top team Kalmar FF. Although he was not signed by Kalmar, he made a good impression and in an interview post Henderson's trial, a Kalmar FF spokesperson mentioned the possibility of signing Henderson in future.

===== Mjällby AIF =====
In December 2009 Henderson signed a three-year contract with the Swedish 1st Division Club, Mjällby AIF, who were promoted from the Swedish 2nd Division at the conclusion of the preceding season. He began his appointment with the club in January 2010. Specific terms of the contract are undisclosed, but include a signing bonus, salary and other stipends.

On 26 February 2010, Henderson suffered a knee injury in pre-season training with Mjällby AIF which prevented him from making his All Whites debut against Mexico the following week. A scan later revealed a ruptured Anterior cruciate ligament which required surgery, keeping Henderson out of all football for six to eight months, ending his hopes of representing New Zealand at the 2010 FIFA World Cup. After several setbacks with his injury he finally got to make his league debut in August 2012 against IFK Göteborg.

==== Stabæk ====
In February 2015, Henderson signed for Norwegian Tippeligaen side Stabæk Fotball.

After over a year out injured, Henderson made his return with Stabæk's second team in July 2015. Going on to join Mjøndalen IF on loan for the remainder of the 2015 season in August.

==== Indy Eleven ====
In February 2017, NASL team Indy Eleven announced the signing of Henderson for the 2017 season.

=== International career ===
Henderson has achieved national representation in all age-grade teams including the New Zealand national under-23 football team who participated in the 2008 Summer Olympics in Beijing. He played in all of New Zealand's qualifying matches and in New Zealand's three group matches against China (1-1), Brazil (0–5) and Belgium (0–1).

Henderson also competed at the 2007 FIFA Under 20 World Cup with captain and fellow Dartmouth College teammate Dan Keat.

On 9 February 2010, Henderson was officially selected in a 17-strong New Zealand squad to face Mexico in an International friendly in Los Angeles on 3 March 2010, however, a knee injury sustained while training with his club side one week from the game ruled him out of the match.

Henderson received a further All Whites callup on 17 May 2011, as part of a 23-man squad to play friendlies against Mexico and Australia in June.

After returning from his long-term injury and getting plenty of playing time for his club team, Henderson finally made his debut for the senior New Zealand team on 15 October 2013 in a friendly against Trinidad and Tobago.

== Career statistics ==
=== Club ===
As of match played 16 August 2015

Club	Season	League			National Cup		Continental		Other		Total	
Club	Season	Division	Apps	Goals	Apps	Goals	Apps	Goals	Apps	Goals	Apps	Goals
Mjällby	2010	Allsvenskan	0	0	0	0	-		-		0	0
Mjällby	2011	Allsvenskan	0	0	0	0	-		-		0	0
Mjällby	2012	Allsvenskan	12	2	1	0	-		-		13	2
Mjällby	2013	Allsvenskan	25	5	1	0	-		-		26	5
Mjällby	Total		37	7	2	0	-	-	-	-	39	7
Stabæk	2014	Tippeligaen	6	1	2	0	-		-		8	1
Stabæk	2015	Tippeligaen	0	0	0	0	-		-		0	0
Stabæk	Total		6	1	2	0	-	-	-	-	8	1
Mjøndalen	2015	Tippeligaen	1	1	0	0	-		-		1	1
Mjøndalen	Total		1	1	0	0	-	-	-	-	1	1
Career total			44	9	4	0	0	0	0	0	48	9

=== International ===
As of match played 19 November 2013

New Zealand
Year	Apps	Goals
2013	2	0
Total	2	0
