= 2016 Indy Eleven season =

Indy Eleven
2016 season
- Owner: Ersal Ozdemir
- Head coach: Tim Hankinson
- Stadium: Michael Carroll Stadium
- NASL: Spring: 1st Fall: 2nd Combined: 2nd
- Soccer Bowl: Runners Up
- U.S. Open Cup: Fourth Round vs Chicago Fire
- Top goalscorer: League: Éamon Zayed (15); All: Éamon Zayed (16)
- Highest home attendance: 9,341 (Jun 10 vs. Carolina)
- Lowest home attendance: League: 7,415 (May 7 vs. Edmonton); All: 2,145 (Jun 1 vs. Louisville)
- Average home league attendance: League: 8,801; All: 7,458
Home colors	Away colors	Third colors

The 2016 Indy Eleven season was the club's third season of existence. The club continued to play in North American Soccer League, the second tier of the American soccer pyramid.

== Roster ==
As of match played November 13, 2016

No.	Name	Nationality	Position	Date of birth (age)	Signed from	Signed in	Contract ends	Apps.	Goals
Goalkeepers
1	Keith Cardona	(United States)	GK	November 7, 1992 (aged 24)	(Austria) Liefering	2015		14	0
18	Jon Busch	(United States)	GK	August 18, 1976 (aged 40)	Chicago Fire	2016		32	0
Defenders
5	Lovel Palmer	(Jamaica)	DF	August 30, 1984 (aged 32)	Chicago Fire	2016		25	0
12	Greg Janicki	(United States)	DF	July 9, 1984 (aged 32)	San Antonio Scorpions	2015		47	4
16	Cory Miller	(United States)	DF	July 22, 1988 (aged 28)	Los Angeles Blues	2014		44	0
23	Marco Franco	(United States)	DF	October 6, 1991 (aged 25)	Chicago Fire	2015		57	0
32	Colin Falvey	(Republic of Ireland)	DF	June 20, 1985 (aged 31)	Ottawa Fury	2016		26	1
82	Nemanja Vuković	(Montenegro)	DF	April 13, 1984 (aged 32)	Sacramento Republic	2016		35	3
Midfielders
3	Gerardo Torrado	(Mexico)	MF	April 30, 1979 (aged 37)	(Mexico) Cruz Azul	2016		18	0
4	Brad Ring	(United States)	MF	April 7, 1987 (aged 29)	Portland Timbers	2014		64	3
6	Dylan Mares	(United States)	MF	February 11, 1992 (aged 24)	Indiana Hoosiers	2014		80	11
7	Don Smart	(Jamaica)	MF	April 13, 1984 (aged 32)	RVA	2014		80	8
8	Nicki Paterson	(Scotland)	MF	January 19, 1985 (aged 31)	Ottawa Fury	2016		29	4
10	Siniša Ubiparipović	(Bosnia and Herzegovina)	MF	August 25, 1983 (aged 33)	Ottawa Fury	2016		17	1
15	Daniel Keller	(United States)	MF	February 7, 1992 (aged 24)	Chicago Fire U-23	2015		26	0
33	Gorka Larrea	(Spain)	MF	April 7, 1984 (aged 32)		2016		9	0
Forwards
9	Éamon Zayed	(Libya)	FW	August 4, 1983 (aged 33)	(Malaysia) Sabah	2016		35	16
14	Duke Lacroix	(United States)	FW	October 14, 1993 (aged 23)	Penn Quakers	2015		46	4
20	Justin Braun	(United States)	FW	March 31, 1987 (aged 29)	Sacramento Republic	2016		29	9
24	Jair Reinoso	(Colombia)	FW	June 7, 1985 (aged 31)	(China) Zhejiang Yiteng	2016		11	1
91	Omar Gordon	(Jamaica)	FW	October 8, 1991 (aged 25)	loan from (Jamaica) Montego Bay United	2016	2016	24	3
99	Souleymane Youla	(Guinea)	FW	November 29, 1981 (aged 34)	(Hungary) Budapest Honvéd	2016		14	2

=== Out on loan ===
Note: Flags indicate national team as defined under FIFA eligibility rules; some limited exceptions apply. Players may hold more than one non-FIFA nationality.

No.	Pos.	Nation	Player
19	FW	POL	Wojciech Wojcik (at Oklahoma City Energy)

=== Staff ===
- (United States) Tim Hankinson – Head Coach
- (United States) Tim Regan – Assistant Coach

== Transfers ==
=== Winter ===
Note: Flags indicate national team as has been defined under FIFA eligibility rules. Players may hold more than one non-FIFA nationality.

In: Note: Flags indicate national team as defined under FIFA eligibility rules; some limited exceptions apply. Players may hold more than one non-FIFA nationality.

No.	Pos.	Nation	Player
2	DF	USA	Neil Shaffer (from (United States) Harrisburg City Islanders)
2	DF	USA	Neil Shaffer (loan return from (United States) Harrisburg City Islanders)
5	DF	JAM	Lovel Palmer (from (United States) Chicago Fire)
8	MF	SCO	Nicki Paterson (from (Canada) Ottawa Fury)
9	FW	LBA	Éamon Zayed (from (Malaysia) Sabah)
10	MF	BIH	Siniša Ubiparipović (from (Canada) Ottawa Fury)
18	GK	USA	Jon Busch (from (United States) Chicago Fire)
20	FW	USA	Justin Braun (from (United States) Sacramento Republic)
21	DF	JAM	Stephen DeRoux (from (United States) San Antonio Scorpions)
24	FW	COL	Jair Reinoso (from (China) Zhejiang Yiteng)
32	DF	IRL	Colin Falvey (from (Canada) Ottawa Fury)
33	MF	ESP	Gorka Larrea
82	DF	MNE	Nemanja Vuković (from (United States) Sacramento Republic)
91	FW	JAM	Omar Gordon (loan from (Jamaica) Montego Bay United)
—	FW	JAM	Dino Williams (loan from (Jamaica) Montego Bay United)

Out: Note: Flags indicate national team as defined under FIFA eligibility rules; some limited exceptions apply. Players may hold more than one non-FIFA nationality.

No.	Pos.	Nation	Player
2	DF	USA	Judson McKinney
2	DF	USA	Neil Shaffer (loan to (United States) Harrisburg City Islanders)
3	DF	USA	Jaime Frías (loan return to (Mexico) Guadalajara)
5	DF	HON	Erick Norales (to (United States) Rayo OKC)
8	MF	BRA	Kléberson (to (United States) Fort Lauderdale Strikers)
9	FW	JAM	Brian Brown (loan return to (Jamaica) Harbour View)
10	MF	GUA	Marvin Ceballos (to (United States) Carolina RailHawks)
17	MF	MKD	Dragan Stojkov
18	DF	USA	Kyle Hyland (to (United States) Oklahoma City Energy)
20	MF	HON	Sergio Peña (to (Honduras) Real Sociedad)
21	MF	JAM	Dane Richards (loan return to (United States) New York Red Bulls)
21	DF	JAM	Stephen DeRoux
22	MF	USA	Zach Steinberger (loan return to (United States) Houston Dynamo)
24	GK	GER	Kristian Nicht (to (United States) Minnesota United)
27	MF	USA	Victor Pineda (to (United States) Fort Lauderdale Strikers)
29	MF	USA	Daniel Cuevas (loan return to (Mexico) Santos Laguna)
35	GK	USA	Jon Dawson
99	FW	USA	Charlie Rugg (loan return to (United States) LA Galaxy)
—	FW	JAM	Dino Williams (loan return to (Jamaica) Montego Bay United)

=== Summer ===
In: Note: Flags indicate national team as defined under FIFA eligibility rules; some limited exceptions apply. Players may hold more than one non-FIFA nationality.

No.	Pos.	Nation	Player
3	MF	MEX	Gerardo Torrado (from (Mexico) Cruz Azul)
99	FW	GUI	Souleymane Youla (from (Hungary) Budapest Honvéd)

Out: Note: Flags indicate national team as defined under FIFA eligibility rules; some limited exceptions apply. Players may hold more than one non-FIFA nationality.

No.	Pos.	Nation	Player
19	FW	POL	Wojciech Wojcik (loan to (United States) Oklahoma City Energy)

== Friendlies ==
February 26, 2016 Preseason	Indiana Hoosiers	1–1	Indy Eleven	Bloomington
19:00 EDT	38'	Report	Smart 33'	Attendance: Closed Door
Note: 9 vs. 9 scrimmage

March 2, 2016 Preseason	Ottawa Fury	3–0	Indy Eleven	Casa Grande
EDT	Paulo Jr. 63'; Dyego 66'; Bruna 74' (pen.)	Report		Stadium: Grande Sports World

March 4, 2016 Preseason	Arizona United	0–4	Indy Eleven	Casa Grande
EDT		Report	Wojcik 55', 71', 80'; Lacroix 69'	Stadium: Grande Sports World

March 7, 2016 Preseason	Orange County Blues	1–0	Indy Eleven	Casa Grande
EDT	36'	Report		Stadium: Grande Sports World

March 12, 2016 Preseason	Indy Eleven	1–1	Cincinnati	Indianapolis
11:00 EDT	Zayed 85'	Report	Spencer 64'	Stadium: Key Stadium; Attendance: Closed-door

March 16, 2016 Preseason	Indy Eleven	1–1	Saint Louis	Evansville
EDT	Smart 64'	Report	Herrera 46'	Stadium: Arad McCutchan Stadium

March 19, 2016 Preseason	Indy Eleven	0–1	Louisville City	Indianapolis
EDT		Report	Lubahn 66'	Stadium: Key Stadium; Attendance: Closed-door

March 23, 2016 Preseason	Indy Eleven	1–0	Butler Bulldogs	Westfield
EDT	Zayed 18'; Franco (yellow card) 44'	Report		Stadium: Grand Park

March 25, 2016 Preseason	Louisville Cardinals	0–0	Indy Eleven	Louisville
EDT		Report		Stadium: Cardinal Park

June 26, 2016 Midseason	Indy Eleven (United States)	1–0	(Mexico) C.F. Pachuca	Indianapolis
1:00p.m. EDT	Zayed 7'; Keller (yellow card) 45+'; Miller (yellow card) 84'	Report	Jara (yellow card) 9'; Torres (yellow card) 49'; Morelo (red card) 90'	Stadium: Carroll Stadium; Attendance: 6,055

== Competitions ==
=== NASL Spring season ===
==== Standings ====
Pos	Team	Pld	W	D	L	GF	GA	GD	Pts	Qualification
1	Indy Eleven (S)	10	4	6	0	15	8	+7	18	Playoffs
2	New York Cosmos	10	6	0	4	15	8	+7	18	
3	FC Edmonton	10	5	2	3	9	7	+2	17	
4	Minnesota United	10	5	1	4	16	12	+4	16	
5	Tampa Bay Rowdies	10	4	4	2	11	9	+2	16	
6	Fort Lauderdale Strikers	10	4	3	3	12	12	0	15	
7	Carolina RailHawks	10	4	2	4	11	13	−2	14	
8	Rayo OKC	10	3	3	4	11	12	−1	12	
9	Ottawa Fury	10	2	3	5	9	14	−5	9	
10	Jacksonville Armada	10	1	4	5	5	11	−6	7	
11	Miami FC	10	1	4	5	7	15	−8	7	

Source: NASL
Rules for classification: 1) points; 2) total goal differential; 3) total goals scored; 4) head-to-head record; 5) away goal differential; 6) away goals scored
(S) Spring season champion

==== Results summary ====
Overall								Home						Away					
Pld	W	D	L	GF	GA	GD	Pts	W	D	L	GF	GA	GD	W	D	L	GF	GA	GD
10	4	6	0	15	8	+7	18	3	2	0	12	6	+6	1	4	0	3	2	+1

Last updated: June 11, 2016.
Source: Match reports

==== Results by round ====
Round	1	2	3	4	5	6	7	8	9	10
Stadium	A	H	H	A	H	A	H	A	A	H
Result	D	D	W	W	D	D	W	D	D	W
Position	6	5	4	4	4	4	2	2	2	1

Updated to match(es) played on June 11, 2016. Source: Match reports
A = Away; H = Home; W = Win; D = Draw; L = Loss

==== Matches ====
April 2, 2016 1	Tampa Bay Rowdies	0–0	Indy Eleven	St. Petersburg
19:30 EDT	Collins (yellow card) 40'; King (yellow card) 42'; Portillos (yellow card) 87'; Burgos (yellow card) 87'	IND Report; NASL Report; Summary	Ring (yellow card) 52'	Stadium: Al Lang Stadium; Attendance: 5,740; Referee: Geoff Gamble

April 9, 2016 2	Indy Eleven	1–1	Ottawa Fury	Indianapolis
19:30 EDT	Mares (yellow card) 55'; Paterson (yellow card) 66'; Vuković 89'	Summary	Steele (yellow card) 18'; Vered 56'; Bruna (yellow card) 83'; Chin (yellow card) 84'	Stadium: Carroll Stadium; Attendance: 9,104

April 15, 2016 3	Indy Eleven	2–1	New York Cosmos	Indianapolis
19:30 EDT	Vuković (yellow card) 50'; Braun (yellow card) 57'; Janicki (yellow card) 65'; Zayed 90' (pen.), 90+5'; Ring (yellow card) 90+5'	Summary	Kranjčar 51' (pen.); Freeman (yellow card) 89'	Stadium: Carroll Stadium; Attendance: 9,067

April 30, 2016 4	Rayo OKC	1–2	Indy Eleven	Yukon
20:00 EDT	Michel 26'; Forbes (yellow card) 29'; Danso (yellow card) 69'	Summary	Reinoso 7'; Ubiparipović (yellow card) 9'; Paterson (yellow card) 44'; Vuković 77'; Gordon (yellow card) 84'	Stadium: Miller Stadium; Attendance: 4,729

May 7, 2015 5	Indy Eleven	1–1	Edmonton	Indianapolis
19:30 EDT	Janicki 22'; Palmer (yellow card) 68'; Larrea (yellow card) 71'	Summary	Ledgerwood (yellow card) 30'; Keegan 37' (yellow card) 78'	Stadium: Carroll Stadium; Attendance: 7,415; Referee: Nima Saghafi

May 14, 2016 6	Fort Lauderdale Strikers	0–0	Indy Eleven	Fort Lauderdale
19:00 EDT	PC (yellow card) 75'; Santos (yellow card) 83'	Summary	Braun (yellow card) 61'	Stadium: Lockhart Stadium; Attendance: 1,048; Referee: Mark Kadlecik

May 21, 2016 7	Indy Eleven	4–2	Minnesota United	Indianapolis
19:30 EDT	Zayed 16'; Gordon 49'; Falvey (yellow card) 56'; Braun 75'; Busch (yellow card) 76'; Paterson 90+7'	Summary	Cruz (yellow card) 7'; Pinho 54'; Lowe 69'; Davis (yellow card) 90+3' (yellow-red card) 90+6'	Stadium: Michael Carroll Stadium; Attendance: 9,076; Referee: Mathieu Bourdeau

May 28, 2016 8	Jacksonville Armada	1–1	Indy Eleven	Jacksonville
19:00 EDT	Bahner 30' (yellow card) 63'	Summary	Miller (yellow card) 28'; Paterson (yellow card) 41'; Vuković (yellow card) 70'; Braun 73'	Stadium: Baseball Grounds of Jacksonville; Attendance: 4,412; Referee: Sorin Stoica

June 4, 2016 9	Miami	0–0	Indy Eleven	Miami
20:00 EDT	Adaílton (yellow card) 81'	Summary	Larrea (yellow card) 83'; Franco (yellow card) 90'	Stadium: FIU Stadium; Attendance: 1,837; Referee: Allen Chapman

June 11, 2016 10	Indy Eleven	4–1	Carolina RailHawks	Indianapolis
19:30 EDT	Zayed 16', 65', 85'; Braun 45+1'	Summary	Albadawi 29'; Mensing (yellow card) 45'	Stadium: Carroll Stadium; Attendance: 9,341; Referee: Marcos de Oliveira

=== NASL Fall season ===
==== Standings ====
Pos	Team	Pld	W	D	L	GF	GA	GD	Pts	Qualification
1	New York Cosmos (F)	22	14	5	3	44	21	+23	47	Playoffs
2	Indy Eleven	22	11	4	7	36	25	+11	37	
3	FC Edmonton	22	10	6	6	16	14	+2	36	
4	Rayo OKC	22	9	8	5	28	21	+7	35	
5	Miami FC	22	9	6	7	31	27	+4	33	
6	Fort Lauderdale Strikers	22	7	5	10	19	28	−9	26	
7	Carolina RailHawks	22	7	5	10	25	35	−10	26	
8	Minnesota United	22	6	7	9	25	25	0	25	
9	Puerto Rico	22	5	9	8	19	31	−12	24	
10	Tampa Bay Rowdies	22	5	8	9	29	32	−3	23	
11	Jacksonville Armada	22	5	8	9	25	35	−10	23	
12	Ottawa Fury	22	5	7	10	23	26	−3	22	

Source: NASL
Rules for classification: 1) points; 2) total goal differential; 3) total goals scored; 4) head-to-head record; 5) away goal differential; 6) away goals scored
(F) Fall season champion

==== Results summary ====
Overall								Home						Away					
Pld	W	D	L	GF	GA	GD	Pts	W	D	L	GF	GA	GD	W	D	L	GF	GA	GD
22	11	4	7	36	24	+12	37	10	1	0	25	4	+21	1	3	7	11	20	−9

Last updated: November 3, 2016.
Source: Match reports

==== Results by round ====
Round	1	2	3	4	5	6	7	8	9	10	11	12	13	14	15	16	17	18	19	20	21	22
Stadium	A	H	H	A	H	A	H	H	H	A	A	A	H	A	H	H	A	A	H	A	H	A
Result	D	W	W	L	W	L	W	W	W	L	D	L	D	L	W	W	L	D	W	W	W	L
Position	5	3	2	3	1	5	1	1	1	3	3	3	3	4	4	2	4	4	3	2	2	2

Updated to match(es) played on November 3, 2016. Source: Match reports
A = Away; H = Home; W = Win; D = Draw; L = Loss

==== Matches ====
July 2, 2016 1	Puerto Rico	1–1	Indy Eleven	Bayamón
19:30 EDT	Dawson (yellow card) 12'; Del Campo (yellow card) 45'; Culbertson (yellow card) 58'; Ramos 74'	Summary	Paterson (yellow card) 58'; Youla 90'	Stadium: Juan Ramón Loubriel Stadium; Attendance: 6,500; Referee: Valdin Legister

July 9, 2016 2	Indy Eleven	1–0	Minnesota United	Indianapolis
19:30 EDT	Braun (yellow card) 75'; Mares 78'; Janicki (yellow card) 89'; Palmer (red card) 90+6'	Summary	Pitchkolan (yellow card) 29'	Stadium: Michael Carroll Stadium; Attendance: 8,066; Referee: Geoff Gamble

July 13, 2016 3	Indy Eleven	3–0	Fort Lauderdale Strikers	Indianapolis
22:35 EDT	Zayed 10'; Lacroix 21'; Janicki 26'	Summary	Moura (yellow card) 29' (yellow-red card) 41'; Núñez (yellow card) 44'; Agbossoumonde (yellow card) 90'	Stadium: Michael Carroll Stadium; Attendance: 6,132; Referee: Alex Chilowicz

July 16, 2016 4	Minnesota United	2–0	Indy Eleven	Blaine
20:00 EDT	Ramirez 3' (pen.), 6'; Davis (yellow card) 71'	Summary	Zayed (yellow card) 32'	Stadium: National Sports Center; Attendance: 9,460; Referee: Baboucarr Jallow

July 23, 2016 5	Indy Eleven	1–0	Edmonton	Indianapolis
19:30 EDT	Janicki 13'; Ring (yellow card) 59'	Summary	Ledgerwood (yellow card) 78'	Stadium: Michael Carroll Stadium; Attendance: 8,119; Referee: Daniel Radford

July 30, 2016 6	Miami	2–1	Indy Eleven	Miami
20:00 EDT	Cvitanich 4'; Steele (yellow card) 42'; Farfán (yellow card) 57'; Poku (yellow card) 79'; Vega (yellow card) 84'; Martínez 85'	Summary	Janicki (yellow card) 87'; Zayed 89'	Stadium: FIU Stadium; Attendance: 5,076; Referee: Nima Saghafi

August 3, 2016 7	Indy Eleven	5–2	Jacksonville Armada	Indianapolis
19:30 EDT	Falvey (yellow card) 1'; Braun 13'; Zayed 16', 58', 65'; Vuković 36'; Janicki (red card) 89'	Summary	Keita 33' (red card) 88'; Scaglia (yellow card) 40'; Falvey 80' (o.g.); Navarro (yellow card) 90'	Stadium: Michael Carroll Stadium; Attendance: 8,017; Referee: Rosendo Mendoza

August 6, 2016 8	Indy Eleven	1–0	Ottawa Fury	Indianapolis
19:30 EDT	Falvey (yellow card) 36'; Youla (yellow card) 57'; Smart (yellow card) 85' (goal) 90+2'	Summary	Bailey (yellow card) 36'	Stadium: Michael Carroll Stadium; Attendance: 7,760; Referee: Guido Gonzalez

August 13, 2016 9	Indy Eleven	2–1	Rayo OKC	Indianapolis
19:30 EDT	Ring (yellow card) 11'; Mares 41'; Zayed (yellow card) 45+2'; Falvey 84'	Summary	Danso 12'	Stadium: Michael Carroll Stadium; Attendance: 7,066; Referee: Marcos de Oliveira

August 21, 2016 10	Carolina RailHawks	3–2	Indy Eleven	Cary
19:30 EDT	Fondy 23'; Miller 54'; Bravo 90+5' (pen.)	Summary	Janicki 20'; Zayed 30' (pen.)	Stadium: WakeMed Soccer Park; Attendance: 6,106; Referee: Mark Kadlecik

August 28, 2016 11	Ottawa Fury	1–1	Indy Eleven	Ottawa
14:00 EDT	Gentile (yellow card) 34'; Olivera (yellow card) 40'; Stewart 59'; Alves (yellow card) 77'	Summary	Smart (yellow card) 54'; Ring 64'	Stadium: TD Place Stadium; Attendance: 6,139; Referee: Alain Ruch

August 31, 2016 12	New York Cosmos	3–0	Indy Eleven	Hempstead
19:30 EDT	Bover 8' (yellow card) 27'; Arango 17' (pen.), 73'; Diosa (yellow card) 67'	Summary	Miller (red card) 53'; Youla (yellow card) 55'; Palmer (yellow card) 67'	Stadium: James M. Shuart Stadium; Attendance: 2,977; Referee: Jaime Herrera Garduno

September 3, 2016 13	Indy Eleven	1–1	Tampa Bay Rowdies	Indianapolis
19:30 EDT	Paterson (yellow card) 29'; Gordon 34'; Smart (yellow card) 45+1'; Vuković (yellow card) 88'; Torrado (yellow card) 89'	Summary	Chavez 28'; Vingaard (yellow card) 42'; Nanchoff (yellow card) 88'	Stadium: Michael Carroll Stadium; Attendance: 9,098; Referee: Edwin Jurisevic

September 10, 2016 14	Fort Lauderdale Strikers	2–1	Indy Eleven	Lauderhill
19:00 EDT	Paulo Jr. 19'; Núñez (yellow card) 52'; Santos 67'; Bruno (yellow card) 90+2'	Summary	Palmer (yellow card) 15'; Ring (yellow card) 42'; Lacroix (yellow card) 76'; Torrado (yellow card) 84'; Braun 88'	Stadium: Central Broward Regional Park; Attendance: 2,376; Referee: Mathieu Bourdeau

September 17, 2016 15	Indy Eleven	2–1	Miami	Indianapolis
19:30 EDT	Mares 25' (yellow card) 50'; Smart 57'	Summary	Palacios (yellow card) 55'; Rennella 67'	Stadium: Michael Carroll Stadium; Attendance: 9,356; Referee: Fotis Bazakos

September 24, 2016 16	Indy Eleven	3–0	New York Cosmos	Indianapolis
19:30 EDT	Braun 32'; Zayed 48'; Mares 51'	Summary		Stadium: Michael Carroll Stadium; Attendance: 9,157; Referee: Dave Gantar

October 2, 2016 17	Edmonton	2–1	Indy Eleven	Edmonton
16:00 EDT	Diakité (yellow card) 68' (goal) 80'; Fisk 90+4'	Summary	Palmer (yellow card) 54'; Zayed 56'	Stadium: Clarke Stadium; Attendance: 1,307; Referee: David Barrie

October 13, 2016 18	Jacksonville Armada	0–0	Indy Eleven	Jacksonville
19:00 EDT	Eloundou (yellow card) 40'	Summary	Falvey (yellow card) 66'; Ubiparipović (yellow card) 85'	Stadium: Baseball Grounds of Jacksonville; Attendance: 1,254; Referee: Guido Gonzalez

October 15, 2016 19	Indy Eleven	3–0	Carolina RailHawks	Indianapolis
19:30 EDT	Braun 45'; Paterson 77'; Lacroix (yellow card) 79'; Youla 90' (red card) 90+4'; Busch (yellow card) 90+3'	Summary	Albadawi (yellow card) 40'; Mensing (yellow card) 74'	Stadium: Michael Carroll Stadium; Attendance: 8,649; Referee: Victor Rivas

October 19, 2016 20	Tampa Bay Rowdies	2–3	Indy Eleven	St. Petersburg
19:30 EDT	Cole 53', 68'	Summary	Lacroix 15'; Reinoso 31'; Paterson (yellow card) 36' (goal) 85'; Janicki (yellow card) 75'; Ring (yellow card) 90'	Stadium: Al Lang Stadium; Attendance: 5,348; Referee: Marcos de Oliveira

October 22, 2016 21	Indy Eleven	3–0	Puerto Rico	Indianapolis
19:30 EDT	Braun 36'; Zayed 45'; Mares 45+3'	Summary	Oliver (yellow card) 14' (yellow-red card) 38'	Stadium: Michael Carroll Stadium; Attendance: 8,916; Referee: Rosendo Mendoza

October 30, 2016 22	Rayo OKC	2–1	Indy Eleven	Yukon
19:00 EDT	Yuma (yellow card) 54'; Velásquez 61'; Chávez (yellow card) 71'; Hernandez 85'; Pecka (yellow card) 88'	Summary	Franco (yellow card) 29'; Paterson 52' (pen.)	Stadium: Miller Stadium; Attendance: 1,043; Referee: Armando Villarreal

=== NASL Playoff ===
Pos	Team	Pld	W	D	L	GF	GA	GD	Pts	Qualification
1	New York Cosmos (C, X)	32	20	5	7	59	29	+30	65	Championship qualifiers
2	Indy Eleven	32	15	10	7	51	33	+18	55	Championship qualifiers
3	FC Edmonton	32	15	8	9	25	21	+4	53	Championship qualifiers
4	Rayo OKC	32	12	11	9	39	33	+6	47	Championship qualifiers
5	Minnesota United	32	11	8	13	41	37	+4	41	
6	Fort Lauderdale Strikers	32	11	8	13	31	40	−9	41	
7	Miami FC	32	10	10	12	38	42	−4	40	
8	Carolina RailHawks	32	11	7	14	36	48	−12	40	
9	Tampa Bay Rowdies	32	9	12	11	40	41	−1	39	
10	Ottawa Fury	32	7	10	15	32	40	−8	31	
11	Jacksonville Armada	32	6	12	14	30	46	−16	30	
12	Puerto Rico FC	22	5	9	8	19	31	−12	24	

Source: NASL
Rules for classification: 1) points; 2) total goal differential; 3) total goals scored; 4) head-to-head record; 5) away goal differential; 6) away goals scored
(C) Champions; (X) Regular season champion

November 5, 2016 Semi Final	Indy Eleven	1–0	Edmonton	Indianapolis
15:00 EDT	Ubiparipović 63'	Summary	Diakité (yellow card) 83'; Eckersley (yellow card) 90+2'	Stadium: Michael Carroll Stadium; Attendance: 9,702; Referee: Sorin Stoica

==== Soccer Bowl ====
November 13, 2016	New York Cosmos	0–0 (a.e.t.) (4–2 p)	Indy Eleven	Queens
19:00 EDT	Arrieta (yellow card) 116'	Summary	Ring (yellow card) 72'; Falvey (yellow card) 83'	Stadium: Belson Stadium; Attendance: 2,150; Referee: Allen Chapman
	Penalties
	Arrieta (penalty scored); Moffat (penalty scored); Ayoze (penalty scored); Richter (penalty scored)		(penalty scored) Paterson; (penalty missed) Zayed; (penalty missed) Busch; (penalty scored) Vuković

=== U.S. Open Cup ===
June 1, 2016 Third Round	Indy Eleven	2–1	Louisville City	Indianapolis
19:30 EDT	Gordon 58'; Zayed 68' (yellow card) 81'; Keller (yellow card) 84'	Summary	Hoffman 21'; Lancaster (yellow card) 26'	Stadium: Carroll Stadium; Attendance: 2,145; Referee: Brandon Artis

June 15, 2016 Fourth Round	Chicago Fire	1–1 (a.e.t.) (4–3 p)	Indy Eleven	Bridgeview
20:30 EDT	LaBrocca (yellow card) 87'; Accam 111'	Summary	Braun (yellow card) 27', (goal) 105'; Paterson (yellow card) 72'; Youla (yellow card) 90+2'; Vuković (yellow card) 117'	Stadium: Toyota Park; Referee: Elvis Mahmutovic
	Penalties
	Igboananike (penalty missed); Thian (penalty scored); Vincent (penalty scored); LaBrocca (penalty scored); Accam (penalty scored)		Paterson (penalty scored); Zayed (penalty scored); Vuković (penalty missed); Keller (penalty missed); Ubiparipović (penalty scored)

== Squad statistics ==
As of Match played November 13, 2016

=== Appearances and goals ===
No.	Pos	Nat	Player	Total		NASL Spring Season		NASL Fall Season		NASL Playoffs		U.S. Open Cup	
No.	Pos	Nat	Player	Apps	Goals	Apps	Goals	Apps	Goals	Apps	Goals	Apps	Goals
1	GK	(United States) USA	Keith Cardona	4	0	0	0	3	0	0	0	1	0
2	DF	(United States) USA	Neil Shaffer	3	0	0	0	2	0	0	0	1	0
3	MF	(Mexico) MEX	Gerardo Torrado	18	0	0	0	10+6	0	0+2	0	0	0
4	MF	(United States) USA	Brad Ring	30	1	5+1	0	17+4	1	2	0	1	0
5	DF	(Jamaica) JAM	Lovel Palmer	25	0	7	0	13+5	0	0	0	0	0
6	MF	(United States) USA	Dylan Mares	33	5	7+2	0	17+3	5	2	0	2	0
7	MF	(Jamaica) JAM	Don Smart	25	2	2+3	0	15+2	2	2	0	1	0
8	MF	(Scotland) SCO	Nicki Paterson	29	4	8+2	1	10+7	3	0+1	0	1	0
9	FW	(Libya) LBA	Éamon Zayed	35	16	9+1	6	21	9	2	0	1+1	1
10	MF	(Bosnia and Herzegovina) BIH	Siniša Ubiparipović	17	1	5+1	0	7+1	0	2	1	0+1	0
12	DF	(United States) USA	Greg Janicki	26	4	9	1	13+1	3	2	0	1	0
14	FW	(United States) USA	Duke Lacroix	27	2	3+5	0	5+10	2	0+2	0	2	0
15	MF	(United States) USA	Daniel Keller	9	0	0+1	0	4+2	0	0	0	1+1	0
16	DF	(United States) USA	Cory Miller	15	0	1+1	0	12	0	0	0	1	0
18	GK	(United States) USA	Jon Busch	32	0	10	0	19	0	2	0	1	0
20	FW	(United States) USA	Justin Braun	29	9	9+1	3	14+1	5	2	0	1+1	1
23	DF	(United States) USA	Marco Franco	23	0	3+2	0	11+3	0	2	0	2	0
24	FW	(Colombia) COL	Jair Reinoso	11	2	2+4	1	2+2	1	0	0	1	0
32	DF	(Republic of Ireland) IRL	Colin Falvey	26	1	10	0	13	1	2	0	1	0
33	MF	(Spain) ESP	Gorka Larrea	9	0	4+4	0	0	0	0	0	0+1	0
82	DF	(Montenegro) MNE	Nemanja Vuković	35	3	10	2	20+1	1	2	0	2	0
91	FW	(Jamaica) JAM	Omar Gordon	23	3	7	1	9+6	1	0	0	1	1
99	FW	(Guinea) GUI	Souleymane Youla	14	2	0	0	5+8	2	0	0	0+1	0
Players away on loan:
19	FW	(Poland) POL	Wojciech Wojcik	1	0	0+1	0	0	0	0	0	0	0
Players who left Indy Eleven during the season:

=== Goal scorers ===
Place	Position	Nation	Number	Name	NASL Spring Season	NASL Fall Season	NASL Playoffs	U.S. Open Cup	Total
1	FW	(Libya)	9	Éamon Zayed	6	9	0	1	16
2	FW	(United States)	20	Justin Braun	3	5	0	1	9
3	MF	(United States)	6	Dylan Mares	0	5	0	0	5
4	DF	(United States)	12	Greg Janicki	1	3	0	0	4
4	MF	(Scotland)	8	Nicki Paterson	1	3	0	0	4
6	DF	(Montenegro)	82	Nemanja Vuković	2	1	0	0	3
6	FW	(Jamaica)	91	Omar Gordon	1	1	0	1	3
8	FW	(Colombia)	24	Jair Reinoso	1	1	0	0	2
8	MF	(Jamaica)	7	Don Smart	0	2	0	0	2
8	FW	(Guinea)	99	Souleymane Youla	0	2	0	0	2
8	FW	(United States)	14	Duke Lacroix	0	2	0	0	2
12	DF	(Republic of Ireland)	32	Colin Falvey	0	1	0	0	1
12	MF	(United States)	4	Brad Ring	0	1	0	0	1
12	MF	(Bosnia and Herzegovina)	10	Siniša Ubiparipović	0	0	1	0	1
TOTALS					15	36	1	3	55

=== Disciplinary record ===
Number	Nation	Position	Name	NASL Spring Season		NASL Fall Season		NASL Playoffs		U.S. Open Cup		Total	
Number	Nation	Position	Name	Yellow card	Red card	Yellow card	Red card	Yellow card	Red card	Yellow card	Red card	Yellow card	Red card
3	(Mexico)	MF	Gerardo Torrado	0	0	2	0	0	0	0	0	2	0
4	(United States)	MF	Brad Ring	2	0	4	0	1	0	0	0	7	0
5	(Jamaica)	DF	Lovel Palmer	1	0	3	1	0	0	0	0	4	1
6	(United States)	MF	Dylan Mares	1	0	1	0	0	0	0	0	2	0
7	(Jamaica)	MF	Don Smart	0	0	3	0	0	0	0	0	3	0
8	(Scotland)	MF	Nicki Paterson	3	0	3	0	0	0	1	0	7	0
9	(Libya)	FW	Éamon Zayed	0	0	2	0	0	0	1	0	3	0
10	(Bosnia and Herzegovina)	MF	Siniša Ubiparipović	1	0	1	0	0	0	0	0	2	0
12	(United States)	DF	Greg Janicki	1	0	3	1	0	0	0	0	4	1
14	(United States)	FW	Duke Lacroix	0	0	2	0	0	0	0	0	2	0
15	(United States)	MF	Daniel Keller	0	0	0	0	0	0	1	0	1	0
16	(United States)	DF	Cory Miller	1	0	0	1	0	0	0	0	1	1
18	(United States)	GK	Jon Busch	1	0	1	0	0	0	0	0	2	0
20	(United States)	FW	Justin Braun	2	0	1	0	0	0	1	0	4	0
23	(United States)	DF	Marco Franco	1	0	1	0	0	0	0	0	2	0
32	(Republic of Ireland)	DF	Colin Falvey	1	0	3	0	1	0	0	0	5	0
33	(Spain)	MF	Gorka Larrea	1	0	0	0	0	0	0	0	1	0
82	(Montenegro)	DF	Nemanja Vuković	2	0	1	0	0	0	1	0	4	0
91	(Jamaica)	FW	Omar Gordon	1	0	0	0	0	0	0	0	1	0
99	(Guinea)	FW	Souleymane Youla	0	0	2	1	0	0	1	0	3	1
			TOTALS	21	0	32	4	2	0	6	0	60	4
