= Soccer Bowl 2016 =

Soccer match

- Event: Soccer Bowl
New York Cosmos	Indy Eleven
0	0
- After extra time New York Cosmos won 4–2 on penalties
- Date: November 13, 2016
- Venue: Belson Stadium, Queens, New York
- Referee: Allen Chapman
- Attendance: 2,150

NASL Championship Final 2016 is the North American Soccer League's postseason championship match of the 2016 season which determined the NASL Champion.

== Background ==
The Indy Eleven were the first team to earn a spot in "The Championship", when they won the Spring Championship back in June. They edged out the New York Cosmos in the Spring season on the third tiebreaker (head-head). The New York Cosmos responded by winning the Fall Championship. They qualified with two games to spare and setting the home unbeaten record in modern NASL history. The league saw six teams fighting for the last playoff spot with four games left to play. Going into the final matchday, only two teams were left. Before their final regular season match, Rayo OKC qualified for "The Championship" in their first season.

== Path to the final ==
=== Semi-final #1 ===
Indy Eleven and FC Edmonton met three times in the regular season. They split the first game in the Spring season, and they each won their home match-ups in the Fall season.

November 5, 2016
3:00 pm EDT

Indy Eleven	1 – 0	FC Edmonton
Ubiparipović 63'	Report; Report	Diakité (yellow card) 83'; Eckersley (yellow card) 90+2'

Carroll Stadium, Indianapolis, Indiana
Attendance: 9,702
Referee: Sorin Stoica

=== Semi-final #2 ===
The New York Cosmos come into the Semi-final match as the home team, having secured their spot by winning, both the Fall season and North American Supporters' Trophy on the same night, with two matches left to play. The Cosmos meet Rayo OKC in the 2nd Semi-Final. The two teams meet three times during the regular season. The third match was a 1—1 draw at the Cosmos' Shuart Stadium.

November 5, 2016
7:00 pm EDT

New York Cosmos	2 – 1	Rayo OKC
Arango 73' (yellow card) 77'; Orozco 90'; Duk (yellow card) 90+2'	Report; Report	Danso 37'; Velásquez (yellow card) 42'; Kimura (yellow card) 64'

Shuart Stadium, Hempstead, New York
Attendance: 5,023
Referee: Jose Carlos Rivero

== Stadium Controversy ==
Before the 2016 season began, Hofstra University told the Cosmos that there would be a scheduling conflict with the date of the 2016 Championship Final, and if the team were to host the championship game they would be forced to rent another venue. The club considered sites around the area including MCU Park in Brooklyn, which was rejected because it would have cost thousands of dollars to bring in turf to cover the baseball lines. The team also considered recommending a neutral site, or even selling the hosting rights to whatever club they would be facing in the Final, but those plans were never pursued. The Cosmos tried to work out a deal with Hofstra, including moving the date of the Championship Final to a weekday, but those proposals were "shot down" by the university.

The Cosmos eventually settled on Belson Stadium on the campus of St. John's University. The announcement that the league's championship game would be played in a 2200-seat venue prompted derision from fans of the club and league, who took to social media with the hashtag #BiggerThanBelson. The Final was played at Belson but failed to sell out, with only 2,150 tickets sold.

== Match ==
=== Details ===
November 13, 2016
7:00 pm EST

New York Cosmos	0 – 0 (a.e.t.)	Indy Eleven
	Report; Report
Penalties
Arrieta (penalty scored); Moffat (penalty scored); Ayoze (penalty scored); Richter (penalty scored)	4–2	(penalty scored) Paterson; (penalty missed) Zayed; (penalty missed) Busch; (penalty scored) Vuković

Belson Stadium, Oueens, New York
Attendance: 2,150
Referee: Allen Chapman

New York Cosmos	Indy Eleven

2016 NASL Champions: New York Cosmos

New York Cosmos:
GK	1	(United States) Jimmy Maurer
DF	4	(United States) Carlos Mendes (c)
DF	6	(Brazil) Rovérsio		(substituted off) 59'
DF	2	(United States) Ryan Richter
DF	17	(Spain) Ayoze
MF	11	(El Salvador) Andrés Flores		(substituted off) 103'
MF	15	(Spain) Ruben Bover
MF	18	(Venezuela) Juan Arango
MF	16	(Scotland) Adam Moffat
MF	19	(Venezuela) Yohandry Orozco		(substituted off) 77'
FW	25	(Costa Rica) Jairo Arrieta	(yellow card) 116'
Substitutes:
GK	24	(United States) Brian Holt
DF	3	(Kenya) David Ochieng		(substituted on) 59'
DF	23	(United States) Jimmy Ockford
DF	28	(United States) Jimmy Mulligan
MF	14	(United States) Danny Szetela		(substituted on) 103'
MF	26	(United States) Eric Calvillo
FW	21	(Colombia) David Diosa		(substituted on) 77'
Manager: (Venezuela) Giovanni Savarese

Indy Eleven:
GK	18	(United States) Jon Busch
DF	23	(United States) Marco Franco
DF	82	(Montenegro) Nemanja Vuković
DF	12	(United States) Greg Janicki
DF	32	(Republic of Ireland) Colin Falvey (c)	(yellow card) 83'
MF	6	(United States) Dylan Mares		(substituted off) 45'
MF	7	(Jamaica) Don Smart		(substituted off) 90'
MF	10	(Bosnia and Herzegovina) Siniša Ubiparipović		(substituted off) 101'
MF	4	(United States) Brad Ring	(yellow card) 72'
FW	9	(Libya) Éamon Zayed
FW	20	(United States) Justin Braun
Substitutes:
GK	1	(United States) Keith Cardona
DF	5	(Jamaica) Lovel Palmer
MF	3	(Mexico) Gerardo Torrado		(substituted on) 45'
MF	8	(Scotland) Nicki Paterson		(substituted on) 101'
MF	15	(United States) Daniel Keller
FW	14	(United States) Duke Lacroix		(substituted on) 90'
FW	99	(Guinea) Souleymane Youla
Manager: (United States) Tim Hankinson

MATCH OFFICIALS

- Assistant referees:
  - Kyle Atkins
  - Cameron Blanchard
- Fourth official: Robert Sibiga
- Reserve official: Eric Weisbrod

=== Statistics ===
Overall	New York	Indy
Goals scored	0	0
Total shots	20	9
Shots on target	4	1
Ball possession	59%	41%
Corner kicks	8	6
Fouls committed	16	18
Offsides	4	6
Saves	1	4
Yellow cards	1	2
Red cards	0	0
