= 2016 North American Soccer League season =

North American Soccer League
- Season: 2016
- Champions: New York Cosmos
- Spring Champions: Indy Eleven
- Fall Champions: New York Cosmos
- Matches: 187
- Goals: 441 (2.36 per match)
- Top goalscorer: (United States) Christian Ramirez (18)
- Biggest home win: 5 goals: NYC 6–1 CAR (August 27)
- Biggest away win: 4 goals: MNU 0–4 MIA (Aug 6)
- Highest scoring: 7 goals: IND 5–2 JAX (August 3); NYC 6–1 CAR (August 27)
- Longest winning run: 5 games: FC Edmonton (Jul 27 – Aug 20)
- Longest unbeaten run: 13 games: Indy Eleven (Apr 2 – Jul 11)
- Longest winless run: 10 games: Puerto Rico (Jul 30 – Sep 17)
- Longest losing run: 5 games: Jacksonville (Jul 13 – Aug 3)
- Highest attendance: 10,156; MIA 1–1 TBR (April 9)
- Lowest attendance: 418; FTL 1–0 FCE (October 12)
- Total attendance: 885,337
- Average attendance: 4,734

The 2016 North American Soccer League season is the 49th season of Division II soccer in the United States and Canada, and the 6th season of the modern North American Soccer League.

Three expansion clubs joined the league, with Miami FC and Rayo OKC joining in the Spring season and Puerto Rico FC beginning competition in the Fall season. In December, 2015, the San Antonio Scorpions' home stadium, Toyota Field, was bought by the city of San Antonio for use by Spurs Sports & Entertainment to host a club in the USL, forcing the Scorpions to cease operations. In January, 2016, the NASL suspended its operation of the Atlanta Silverbacks for the 2016 season and possibly beyond. As a result, the Spring season was contested by 11 clubs and the Fall season by 12. The New York Cosmos are defending Soccer Bowl champions. A split season format was used for the 2016 season.

== Teams, stadiums, and personnel ==
=== Stadiums and locations ===
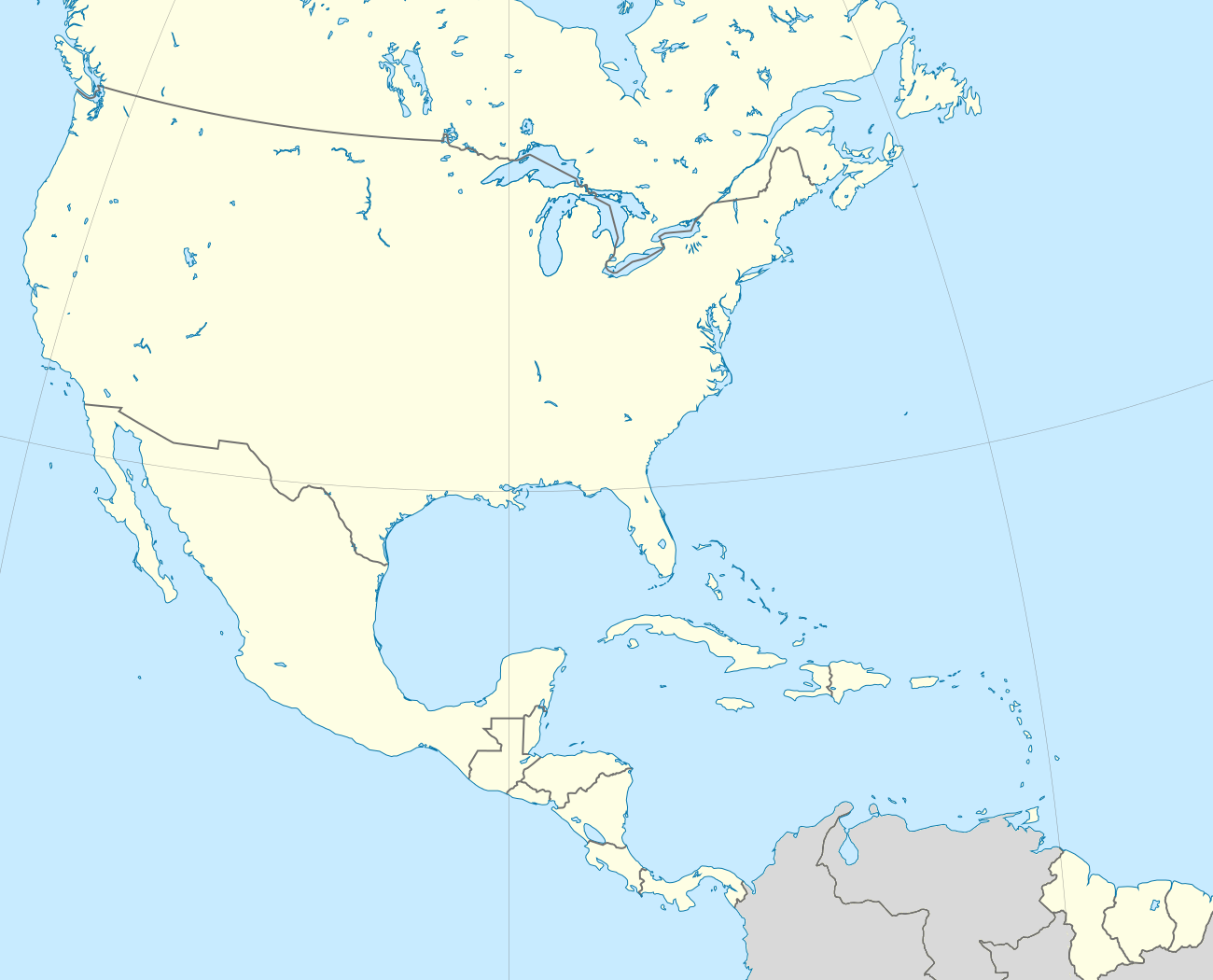
Locations of NASL clubs

=== Personnel and sponsorship ===
Team	Head coach	Captain	Kit producer	Shirt sponsor
Carolina RailHawks	(Northern Ireland) Colin Clarke	(United States) Nazmi Albadawi	Adidas	Blue Cross Blue Shield of NC
FC Edmonton	(Canada) Colin Miller	(Northern Ireland) Albert Watson	Adidas	The Fath Group
Fort Lauderdale Strikers	(Brazil) Caio Zanardi	(Haiti) Jean Alexandre	Inaria	Guaraviton
Indy Eleven	(United States) Tim Hankinson	(Republic of Ireland) Colin Falvey	Diadora	Honda
Jacksonville Armada FC	(England) Mark Lowry	(United States) Matt Bahner	Nike	Winn-Dixie
Miami FC	(Italy) Alessandro Nesta	(United States) Jonathan Borrajo	Macron	
Minnesota United FC	(England) Carl Craig	(United States) Aaron Pitchkolan	Inaria	Atomic Data / Mall of America
New York Cosmos	(Venezuela) Giovanni Savarese	(United States) Carlos Mendes	Under Armour	Emirates
Ottawa Fury FC	(Scotland) Paul Dalglish	(Canada) Julian de Guzman	Adidas	Chartwells
Puerto Rico FC	(England) Adrian Whitbread	(Brazil) Cristiano	Nike	Claro
Rayo OKC	(Spain) Gerard Nus	(Brazil) Michel	Kelme	
Tampa Bay Rowdies	(Scotland) Stuart Campbell	(England) Tamika Mkandawire	Nike	Seminole Hard Rock Hotel and Casino

=== Managerial changes ===
Team	Outgoing manager	Manner of departure	Date of vacancy	Position in table	Incoming manager	Date of appointment
Puerto Rico	Expansion team				(England) Adrian Whitbread	August 24, 2015
Miami	Expansion team				(Italy) Alessandro Nesta	August 31, 2015
Ottawa Fury	(Canada) Marc Dos Santos	End of contract	November 20, 2015	Pre-season	(Scotland) Paul Dalglish	November 20, 2015
Jacksonville Armada	(United States) Eric Dade (int.)	End of interim period	November 24, 2015	Pre-season	(United States) Tony Meola	November 24, 2015
Indy Eleven	(United States) Tim Regan (int.)	End of interim period	December 2, 2015	Pre-season	(United States) Tim Hankinson	December 2, 2015
Fort Lauderdale Strikers	(Austria) Günter Kronsteiner	End of contract	November 16, 2015	Pre-season	(Brazil) Caio Zanardi	December 2, 2015
Minnesota United	(United States) Manny Lagos	Promotion to general manager	December 3, 2015	Pre-season	(England) Carl Craig	December 3, 2015
San Antonio Scorpions	(Canada) Alen Marcina	Fired	November 1, 2015	Pre-season	Club defunct	
Rayo OKC	Expansion team				(Canada) Alen Marcina	January 7, 2016
Atlanta Silverbacks	(England) Gary Smith	Released	January 11, 2016	Pre-season	Club on hiatus	
Rayo OKC	(Canada) Alen Marcina	Mutual termination	August 1, 2016	5th	(Spain) Gerard Nus	August 1, 2016
Jacksonville Armada	(United States) Tony Meola	Fired	August 7, 2016	11th	(England) Mark Lowry (int.)	August 7, 2016

== Spring season ==
=== Standings ===
Pos	Team	Pld	W	D	L	GF	GA	GD	Pts	Qualification
1	Indy Eleven (S)	10	4	6	0	15	8	+7	18	Playoffs
2	New York Cosmos	10	6	0	4	15	8	+7	18	
3	FC Edmonton	10	5	2	3	9	7	+2	17	
4	Minnesota United	10	5	1	4	16	12	+4	16	
5	Tampa Bay Rowdies	10	4	4	2	11	9	+2	16	
6	Fort Lauderdale Strikers	10	4	3	3	12	12	0	15	
7	Carolina RailHawks	10	4	2	4	11	13	−2	14	
8	Rayo OKC	10	3	3	4	11	12	−1	12	
9	Ottawa Fury	10	2	3	5	9	14	−5	9	
10	Jacksonville Armada	10	1	4	5	5	11	−6	7	
11	Miami FC	10	1	4	5	7	15	−8	7	

Source: NASL
Rules for classification: 1) points; 2) total goal differential; 3) total goals scored; 4) head-to-head record; 5) away goal differential; 6) away goals scored
(S) Spring season champion

=== Results ===
Home \ Away	CAR	FCE	FTL	IND	JAX	MIA	MNU	NYC	OTT	OKC	TBR
Carolina RailHawks	—		1–3		0–0	0–0	2–1		1–0		
Edmonton	1–0	—	2–1				0–2	2–1	2–0		
Fort Lauderdale Strikers			—	0–0	1–1	1–1		2–1			0–1
Indy Eleven	4–1	1–1		—			4–2	2–1	1–1		
Jacksonville Armada		0–1		1–1	—	2–1				0–1	1–1
Miami		1–0		0–0		—		0–3		2–3	1–1
Minnesota United			3–0		2–0	3–1	—	1–0			0–2
New York Cosmos	1–0				2–0			—	3–0	1–0	2–1
Ottawa Fury			1–2		1–0	2–0	2–2		—	1–1	
Rayo	2–3	0–0	1–2	1–2			1–0			—	
Tampa Bay Rowdies	1–3	1–0		0–0					2–1	1–1	—

Updated to match(es) played on May 21, 2016. Source:
Legend: Blue = home team win; Yellow = draw; Red = away team win.

== Fall season ==
=== Standings ===
Pos	Team	Pld	W	D	L	GF	GA	GD	Pts	Qualification
1	New York Cosmos (F)	22	14	5	3	44	21	+23	47	Playoffs
2	Indy Eleven	22	11	4	7	36	25	+11	37	
3	FC Edmonton	22	10	6	6	16	14	+2	36	
4	Rayo OKC	22	9	8	5	28	21	+7	35	
5	Miami FC	22	9	6	7	31	27	+4	33	
6	Fort Lauderdale Strikers	22	7	5	10	19	28	−9	26	
7	Carolina RailHawks	22	7	5	10	25	35	−10	26	
8	Minnesota United	22	6	7	9	25	25	0	25	
9	Puerto Rico	22	5	9	8	19	31	−12	24	
10	Tampa Bay Rowdies	22	5	8	9	29	32	−3	23	
11	Jacksonville Armada	22	5	8	9	25	35	−10	23	
12	Ottawa Fury	22	5	7	10	23	26	−3	22	

Source: NASL
Rules for classification: 1) points; 2) total goal differential; 3) total goals scored; 4) head-to-head record; 5) away goal differential; 6) away goals scored
(F) Fall season champion

=== Results ===
Home \ Away	CAR	FCE	FTL	IND	JAX	MIA	MNU	NYC	OTT	PRF	OKC	TBR
Carolina RailHawks	—	1–0	3–0	3–2	1–0	3–3	1–0	0–2	0–0	2–2	0–1	4–1
Edmonton	1–0	—	1–0	2–1	1–0	0–2	1–0	2–1	1–0	0–0	0–0	1–0
Fort Lauderdale Strikers	0–1	1–0	—	2–1	1–0	1–1	0–0	0–0	3–1	2–0	0–2	1–4
Indy Eleven	3–0	1–0	3–0	—	5–2	2–1	1–0	3–0	1–0	3–0	2–1	1–1
Jacksonville Armada	2–2	0–0	1–1	0–0	—	3–2	0–0	2–4	0–2	2–1	1–1	3–2
Miami	1–0	1–0	0–2	2–1	1–0	—	1–1	2–3	2–1	0–1	0–1	2–2
Minnesota United	5–1	3–1	3–1	2–0	0–1	0–4	—	0–1	2–3	1–1	1–0	2–0
New York Cosmos	6–1	0–0	2–0	3–0	3–0	4–0	1–0	—	2–1	3–0	1–1	3–2
Ottawa Fury	2–0	2–2	0–1	1–1	1–2	0–0	3–1	1–1	—	1–2	0–1	2–0
Puerto Rico	2–1	0–1	2–1	1–1	3–3	0–3	0–0	1–2	0–0	—	1–0	0–0
Rayo	1–1	1–1	1–1	2–1	3–2	1–2	2–2	3–0	3–1	2–2	—	1–0
Tampa Bay Rowdies	1–0	0–1	2–1	2–3	1–1	1–1	2–2	2–2	1–1	3–0	2–0	—

Updated to match(es) played on January 2016. Source:
Legend: Blue = home team win; Yellow = draw; Red = away team win.

== Playoffs ==
=== Combined standings ===
Pos	Team	Pld	W	D	L	GF	GA	GD	Pts	Qualification
1	New York Cosmos (C, X)	32	20	5	7	59	29	+30	65	Championship qualifiers
2	Indy Eleven	32	15	10	7	51	33	+18	55	Championship qualifiers
3	FC Edmonton	32	15	8	9	25	21	+4	53	Championship qualifiers
4	Rayo OKC	32	12	11	9	39	33	+6	47	Championship qualifiers
5	Minnesota United	32	11	8	13	41	37	+4	41	
6	Fort Lauderdale Strikers	32	11	8	13	31	40	−9	41	
7	Miami FC	32	10	10	12	38	42	−4	40	
8	Carolina RailHawks	32	11	7	14	36	48	−12	40	
9	Tampa Bay Rowdies	32	9	12	11	40	41	−1	39	
10	Ottawa Fury	32	7	10	15	32	40	−8	31	
11	Jacksonville Armada	32	6	12	14	30	46	−16	30	
12	Puerto Rico FC	22	5	9	8	19	31	−12	24	

Source: NASL
Rules for classification: 1) points; 2) total goal differential; 3) total goals scored; 4) head-to-head record; 5) away goal differential; 6) away goals scored
(C) Champions; (X) Regular season champion

=== The Championship ===
==== Participants ====
- (1) New York Cosmos (Fall season champion)
- (2) Indy Eleven (Spring season champion)
- (3) FC Edmonton
- (4) Rayo OKC

==== Semifinals ====
November 5, 2016
3:00 pm EDT

Indy Eleven	1–0	FC Edmonton
Ubiparipović 63'	Report; Report	Diakité (yellow card) 83'; Eckersley (yellow card) 90+2'

Carroll Stadium, Indianapolis, Indiana
Attendance: 9,702
Referee: Sorin Stoica

November 5, 2016
7:00 pm EDT

New York Cosmos	2–1	Rayo OKC
Arango 73' (yellow card) 77'; Orozco 90'; Duk (yellow card) 90+2'	Report; Report	Danso 37'; Velásquez (yellow card) 42'; Kimura (yellow card) 64'

Shuart Stadium, Hempstead, New York
Attendance: 5,023
Referee: Jose Carlos Rivero

==== Soccer Bowl 2016 ====
November 13, 2016
7:00 pm EST

New York Cosmos	0–0 (a.e.t.)	Indy Eleven
Arrieta (yellow card) 116'	Report; Report	Ring (yellow card) 72'; Falvey (yellow card) 83'
Penalties
Arrieta (penalty scored); Moffat (penalty scored); Ayoze (penalty scored); Richter (penalty scored)	4–2	(penalty scored) Paterson; (penalty missed) Zayed; (penalty missed) Busch; (penalty scored) Vuković

Belson Stadium, Queens, New York
Attendance: 2,150
Referee: Allen Chapman

== Attendance ==
Club	GP	Total	High	Low	Average	Change
Minnesota United	16	137,161	9,460	6,101	8,573	-2.2%
Indy Eleven	16	134,339	9,356	6,132	8,396	-14.4%
Tampa Bay Rowdies	16	94,048	7,690	4,429	5,878	4.1%
Ottawa Fury	16	87,717	7,847	4,317	5,482	6.2%
Miami	16	86,833	10,156	1,229	5,427	N/A
Carolina RailHawks	16	80,923	8,086	3,093	5,058	11.4%
Puerto Rico	11	41,811	6,474	1,233	3,801	N/A
New York Cosmos	16	60,403	6,243	2,419	3,775	-25.4%
Jacksonville Armada	16	55,988	5,313	1,254	3,499	-55.9%
Rayo OKC	16	51,865	6,416	924	3,242	N/A
FC Edmonton	16	32,959	3,130	1,243	2,060	-28.7%
Fort Lauderdale Strikers	16	21,290	2,376	418	1,331	-70.2%
Total	187	885,337	10,156	418	4,734	-19.9%

Source: NASL

=== Highest attendances ===
Regular season

Rank	Home team	Score	Away team	Attendance	Date	Week	Venue
1	Miami	1 – 1	Tampa Bay Rowdies	10,156	April 9, 2016	2	FIU Stadium
2	Miami	1 – 1	Minnesota United	10,012	September 24, 2016	24	FIU Stadium
3	Miami	1 – 1	Minnesota United	9,739	August 27, 2016	20	FIU Stadium
4	Minnesota United	2 – 0	Indy Eleven	9,460	July 16, 2016	14	National Sports Center
5	Minnesota United	0 – 1	Jacksonville Armada	9,402	October 1, 2016	25	National Sports Center

== Statistical leaders ==
=== Top scorers ===
Rank	Player	Club	Goals
1	(United States) Christian Ramirez	Minnesota United	18
2	(Venezuela) Juan Arango	New York Cosmos	15
2	(Libya) Éamon Zayed	Indy Eleven	15
4	(Brazil) Michel	Rayo OKC	14
5	(Bulgaria) Georgi Hristov	Tampa Bay Rowdies	11
6	(England) Joe Cole	Tampa Bay Rowdies	9
6	(Argentina) Darío Cvitanich	Miami	9
8	(United States) Justin Braun	Indy Eleven	8
8	(Scotland) Adam Moffat	New York Cosmos	8
8	(Puerto Rico) Héctor Ramos	Puerto Rico	8

=== Top assists ===
Rank	Player	Club	Assists
1	(Palestine) Nazmi Albadawi	Carolina RailHawks	10
2	(Venezuela) Juan Arango	New York Cosmos	7
2	(England) Joe Cole	Tampa Bay Rowdies	7
4	(United States) Jonathan Borrajo	Miami	6
4	(El Salvador) Andrés Flores	New York Cosmos	6
4	(United States) Dylan Mares	Indy Eleven	6
4	(United States) Kevin Venegas	Minnesota United	6
4	(Libya) Éamon Zayed	Indy Eleven	6
9	(United States) Justin Braun	Indy Eleven	5
9	(Honduras) Ramón Núñez	Fort Lauderdale Strikers	5
9	(United States) Blake Smith	Miami	5

=== Clean sheets ===
Rank	Player	Club	Clean Sheets
1	(United States) Matt Van Oekel	FC Edmonton	16
2	(United States) Jimmy Maurer	New York Cosmos	14
3	(United States) Jon Busch	Indy Eleven	11
4	(Cameroon) Sammy Ndjock	Minnesota United	10
4	(Argentina) Mario Daniel Vega	Miami	10
6	(Portugal) Daniel Fernandes	Rayo OKC	9
7	(United States) Matt Pickens	Tampa Bay Rowdies	8
8	(Brazil) Bruno Cardoso	Fort Lauderdale Strikers	7
8	(France) Romuald Peiser	Ottawa Fury	7
10	(Mexico) Miguel Gallardo	Jacksonville Armada	5
10	(United States) Trevor Spangenberg	Puerto Rico	5

Source: NASL

=== Hat-tricks ===
Player	For	Against	Result	Date
(Libya) Éamon Zayed	Indy Eleven	Carolina RailHawks	4–1	June 11
(United States) Christian Ramirez	Minnesota United	Carolina RailHawks	5–1	July 2
(Libya) Éamon Zayed	Indy Eleven	Jacksonville Armada	5–2	August 3
(Bulgaria) Georgi Hristov	Tampa Bay	Fort Lauderdale	4–1	September 24

== Awards ==
=== Monthly awards ===
Month	NASL Player of the Month			
Month	Player	Club	Stats	Ref
April	(United States) Austin da Luz	Carolina RailHawks	3G	
May	(Senegal) Papé Diakité	FC Edmonton	2G	
June	(Libya) Éamon Zayed	Indy Eleven	3G	
July	(United States) Christian Ramirez	Minnesota United	7G, 1A	
August	(United States) Matt Van Oekel	FC Edmonton	22SV, 0GA	
September	(Argentina) Darío Cvitanich	Miami	3G	

=== Weekly awards ===
Week	NASL Player of the Week		NASL Play of the Week	
Week	Player	Club	Player	Club
Week 1	(Venezuela) Juan Arango	New York Cosmos	(United States) Christian Ramirez	Minnesota United
Week 2	(United States) Austin da Luz	Carolina RailHawks	(United States) Ben Speas	Minnesota United
Week 3	(Libya) Éamon Zayed	Indy Eleven	(Libya) Éamon Zayed	Indy Eleven
Week 4	(United States) Christian Ramirez	Minnesota United	(United States) Christian Ramirez	Minnesota United
Week 5	(Venezuela) Yohandry Orozco	New York Cosmos	(Bolivia) Jair Reinoso	Indy Eleven
Week 6	(Canada) Nana Attakora	Fort Lauderdale Strikers	(United States) Jake Keegan	FC Edmonton
Week 7	(Senegal) Papé Diakité	FC Edmonton	(United States) Kevin Venegas	Minnesota United
Week 8	(Honduras) Ramón Núñez	Fort Lauderdale Strikers	(Spain) Ruben Bover	New York Cosmos
Week 9	(England) Joe Cole	Tampa Bay Rowdies	(United States) Matt Bahner	Jacksonville Armada
Week 10	(Bulgaria) Georgi Hristov	Tampa Bay Rowdies	(United States) Tyler Gibson	Rayo OKC
Week 11	(Libya) Éamon Zayed	Indy Eleven	(Libya) Éamon Zayed	Indy Eleven
Week 12	(United States) Christian Ramirez	Minnesota United	(Puerto Rico) Héctor Ramos	Puerto Rico
Week 13	(Palestine) Nazmi Albadawi	Carolina RailHawks	(United States) Dylan Mares	Indy Eleven
Week 14	(Brazil) Michel	Rayo OKC	(England) Joe Cole	Tampa Bay Rowdies
Week 15	(United States) Jaime Chavez	Miami	(United States) J. C. Banks	Minnesota United
Week 16	(Zimbabwe) Lucky Mkosana	New York Cosmos	(Cuba) Ariel Martínez	Miami
Week 17	(Libya) Éamon Zayed	Indy Eleven	(United States) Keith Savage	Tampa Bay Rowdies
Week 18	(Guinea) Alhassane Keita	Jacksonville Armada	(Puerto Rico) Héctor Ramos	Puerto Rico
Week 19	(United States) Matt Van Oekel	FC Edmonton	(Italy) Amauri	Fort Lauderdale Strikers
Week 20	(El Salvador) Andrés Flores	New York Cosmos	(United States) Brad Ring	Indy Eleven
Week 21	(Northern Ireland) Daryl Fordyce	FC Edmonton	(Brazil) Bruno Cardoso	Fort Lauderdale Strikers
Week 22	(Argentina) Darío Cvitanich	Miami	(France) Romuald Peiser	Ottawa Fury
Week 23	(United States) Matt Van Oekel	FC Edmonton	(Puerto Rico) Joseph Marrero	Puerto Rico
Week 24	(Bulgaria) Georgi Hristov	Tampa Bay Rowdies	(United States) Trevor Spangenberg	Puerto Rico
Week 25	(Spain) Ruben Bover	New York Cosmos	(Puerto Rico) Sidney Rivera	Puerto Rico
Week 26	(Canada) Ben Fisk	FC Edmonton	(United States) J. C. Banks	Minnesota United
Week 27	(Brazil) Michel	Rayo OKC	(United States) Jaime Chavez	Miami
Week 28	(Venezuela) Juan Arango	New York Cosmos	(Haiti) Duke Lacroix	Indy Eleven

=== League awards ===
- Golden Ball (MVP): (Venezuela) Juan Arango (New York Cosmos)
- Golden Boot: (United States) Christian Ramirez (Minnesota United)
- Golden Glove: (United States) Matt Van Oekel (FC Edmonton)
- Coach of the Year: (United States) Tim Hankinson (Indy Eleven)
- Goal of the Year: (Haiti) Duke Lacroix (Indy Eleven)
- Young (U24) Player of the Year: (Senegal) Papé Diakité (FC Edmonton)
- Humanitarian of the Year: (Sierra Leone) Michael Lahoud (Miami FC)
- Fair Play Award: Carolina RailHawks

NASL Best XI
Position	Player	Team
Goalkeeper	(United States) Matt Van Oekel	FC Edmonton
Defense	(Spain) Ayoze	New York Cosmos
Defense	(United States) Justin Davis	Minnesota United
Defense	(Northern Ireland) Albert Watson	FC Edmonton
Defense	(United States) Carlos Mendes	New York Cosmos
Midfield	(Palestine) Nazmi Albadawi	Carolina RailHawks
Midfield	(Venezuela) Juan Arango	New York Cosmos
Midfield	(England) Joe Cole	Tampa Bay Rowdies
Midfield	(Brazil) Michel	Rayo OKC
Forward	(United States) Christian Ramirez	Minnesota United
Forward	(Libya) Éamon Zayed	Indy Eleven
