= Owayne Gordon =

Jamaican footballer (born 1991)

Personal information
- Full name: Owayne Omar Gordon
- Date of birth: 8 October 1991 (age 35)
- Place of birth: Montego Bay, Jamaica
- Height: 1.75 m (5 ft 9 in)
- Positions: Forward; winger

Team information
- Current team: Montego Bay United
- Number: 27

Senior career*
Years	Team	Apps	(Gls)
2011	Arnett Gardens	10	(2)
2011–2019	Montego Bay United	128	(37)
2016	→ Indy Eleven (loan)	23	(2)
2017–2018	→ San Antonio FC (loan)	37	(6)
2019–2020	Oklahoma City Energy	42	(6)
2021	Austin Bold	27	(1)
2022–2024	Richmond Kickers	40	(6)
2024–	Montego Bay United	12	(6)

International career^{‡}
2015–	Jamaica	18	(1)
Medal record
Men's football
Representing Jamaica
CONCACAF Gold Cup
Runner-up	2017 United States	Team
- * Club domestic league appearances and goals as of 16 October 2023 ‡ National team caps and goals as of 1 September 2020

Owayne Omar Gordon (born 8 October 1991) is a Jamaican professional footballer who plays as a forward and winger for Montego Bay United in the National Premier League.

== Career ==
=== Club ===
In April 2016, Gordon joined Indy Eleven on loan for the 2016 season. In January 2017, Gordon returned to Montego Bay United in the RSPL. Gordon joined San Antonio FC on loan for the rest of the 2017 USL season. In February 2021, after two seasons with Oklahoma City Energy FC, Gordon joined Austin Bold FC.

Gordon played for two years for the Richmond Kickers, making 40 appearances and scoring six goals. In 2024, he returned to his native Jamaica and resigned for Montego Bay United.

=== International ===
Gordon has been capped five times for Jamaica senior national team versus Cuba, Guyana, Suriname, USA and Honduras.

=== International ===
As of 1 September 2020

Jamaica national team
Year	Apps	Goals
2015	1	0
2016	2	0
2017	11	0
2018	4	1
Total	18	1

=== International goals ===
Scores and results list Jamaica's goal tally first.

No.	Date	Venue	Opponent	Score	Result	Competition
1.	14 October 2018	Ergilio Hato Stadium, Willemstad, Curaçao	Bonaire	3–0	6–0	2019–20 CONCACAF Nations League qualification

== Honours ==
Jamaica

- Caribbean Cup runner-up 2017
- CONCACAF Gold Cup runner-up: 2017

Montego Bay United

- Jamaica National Premier League: 2014, 2016

Indy Eleven

- NASL Spring Season: 2016
