= Maddy Anderson =

American soccer player (born 2002)

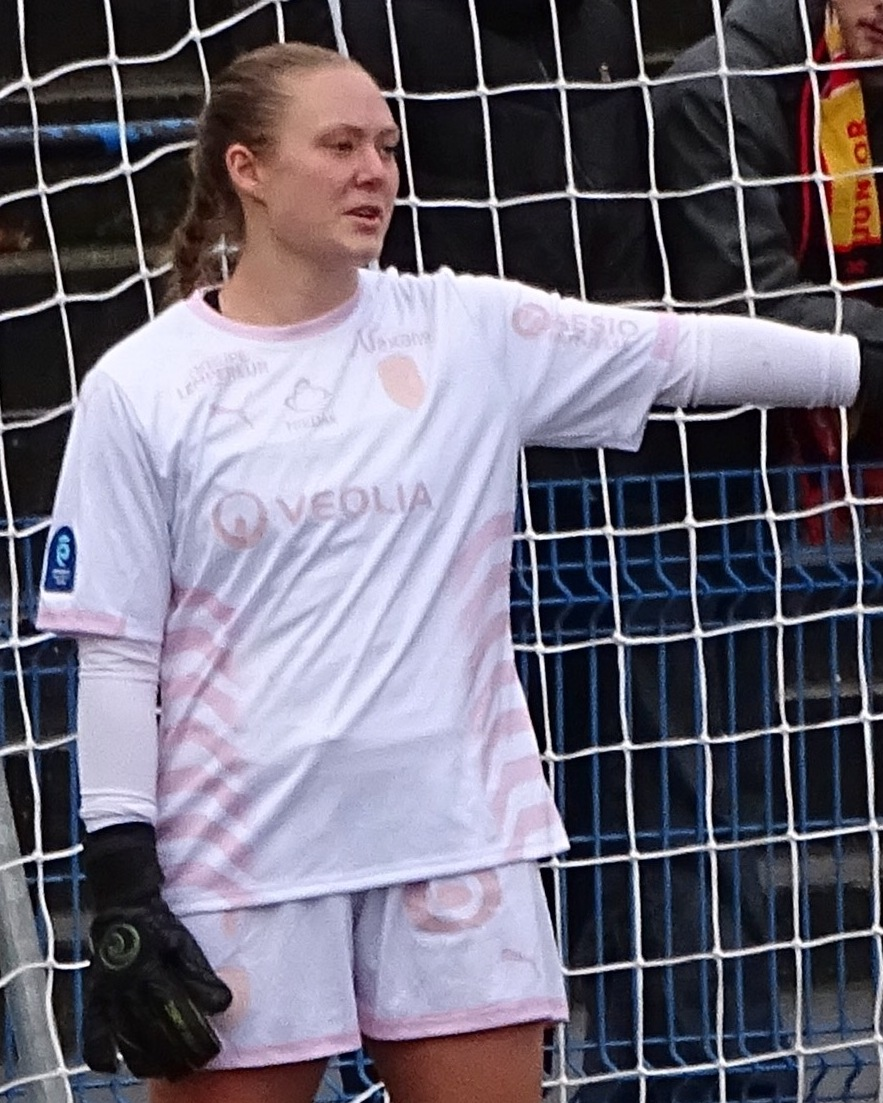
- Anderson with Lens in 2026

Personal information
- Full name: Madelynn Jewel Anderson
- Date of birth: February 22, 2002 (age 24)
- Height: 5 ft 8 in (1.73 m)
- Position: Goalkeeper

Team information
- Current team: Dallas Trinity
- Number: 1

Youth career
- Broomfield SC
- Challenge SC

College career
Years	Team	Apps	(Gls)
2020–2024	Mississippi State Bulldogs	91	(1)

Senior career*
Years	Team	Apps	(Gls)
2025	Racing Louisville	0	(0)
2025–2026	Lens	9	(0)
2026–	Dallas Trinity	0	(0)
- * Club domestic league appearances and goals as of May 6, 2026

Madelynn Jewel Anderson (born February 22, 2002) is an American professional soccer player who plays as a goalkeeper for USL Super League club Dallas Trinity. She played college soccer for the Mississippi State Bulldogs, earning second-team All-American honors in 2024. She began her professional career with French club Lens in 2025.

== Early life ==
Anderson grew up in Broomfield, Colorado, one of two children born to Steven and Kelsie Anderson. She switched from forward to goalkeeper with Broomfield Soccer Club at age 12. Her family moved to Seabrook, Texas, when she was in seventh grade. She attended Clear Falls High School in League City, Texas, where she starred on the soccer team and spent one season as a kicker on the football team. She played ECNL club soccer for Challenge Soccer Club, based in Tomball, Texas, an hour-and-a-half drive away. During one ECNL national training camp in Portland, Oregon, in 2018, she played ten minutes for Paris Saint-Germain in a scrimmage against Manchester City. She committed to play college soccer for Mississippi State over another offer from Auburn when she was a sophomore.

== College career ==
Anderson started all but one game for the Mississippi State Bulldogs as a freshman in 2020, a season disrupted by the COVID-19 pandemic, and kept 2 clean sheets in 12 games. She played every minute of her sophomore season in 2021, keeping 4 clean sheets in 16 games. She scored her only college goal in the last game of her sophomore season, doing so off a penalty kick in a 3–2 win against Ole Miss. In her junior season in 2022, she kept 9 clean sheets in 13 games before injuring her hamstring. She returned for the 2022 NCAA tournament, starting both games as Mississippi State won an NCAA tournament match for the first time in program history.

Anderson became a team captain and started every game in her senior season in 2023, earning second-team All-SEC honors as she kept 10 clean sheets (plus one combined shutout) in 23 games. They finished fourth in the SEC and made the semifinals of the SEC tournament after beating Alabama on penalties. Anderson allowed only two goals during the 2023 NCAA tournament as they reached the round of 16, losing 1–0 to Stanford. She again started every game in her graduate season in 2024, helping lead Mississippi State to their best season in program history. They went undefeated 10–0 in conference play, allowing only two goals, to win the SEC regular-season title for the first time. With a No. 1 seed in the 2024 NCAA tournament, they returned to the round of 16, losing to Notre Dame in the first game they conceded at home all season. Anderson finished with 14 clean sheets (plus 2 combined) in 22 games and was named the SEC Goalkeeper of the Year, first-team All-SEC, and second-team All-American.

== Club career ==
Anderson joined the National Women's Soccer League (NWSL)'s Racing Louisville as a non-roster trialist in the 2025 preseason. On March 21, she signed a short-term contract with Louisville through June, but didn't make any appearances as the backup to Katie Lund and Jordyn Bloomer.

In July 2025, Anderson signed a one-year contract with newly promoted Première Ligue club Lens. She began the season as the backup to Lens vice captain Blandine Joly. On September 13, she made her professional debut for Lens in a 1–0 win over Fleury in the inaugural Coupe LFFP group stage. On December 5, she was handed her Première Ligue debut by manager Sarah M'Barek and kept a clean sheet in a 1–0 home win over Saint-Étienne, Lens's first victory back in the top flight. She subsequently started the next seven league fixtures until Joly regained the job for the end of the season. Lens would have been relegated after the season if not for Dijon's financial problems.

In July 2026, Anderson signed with USL Super League club Dallas Trinity, returning to her home state.

== Honors and awards ==
Mississippi State Bulldogs

- Southeastern Conference: 2024

Individual

- Second-team All-American: 2024
- SEC Goalkeeper of the Year: 2024
- First-team All-SEC: 2024
- Second-team All-SEC: 2023
- SEC all-freshman team: 2020
- SEC tournament all-tournament team: 2024
