= Dino Williams =

Jamaican international footballer (born 1990)

Personal information
- Full name: Dino Williams
- Date of birth: 31 March 1990 (age 36)
- Place of birth: Salt Spring, Jamaica
- Height: 1.86 m (6 ft 1 in)
- Position: Striker

Team information
- Current team: Montego Bay United

Youth career
- Green Pond High
- Montego Bay United

Senior career*
Years	Team	Apps	(Gls)
2009–2013	Village United		
2012	→ Charleston Battery (loan)	9	(0)
2013–	Montego Bay United		
2016	→ Indy Eleven (loan)	0	(0)

International career^{‡}
2012–	Jamaica	4	(0)
- * Club domestic league appearances and goals as of 30 March 2016 ‡ National team caps and goals as of 18:07, 9 April 2012 (UTC)

Dino Williams (born 31 March 1990) is a Jamaican international footballer who plays for Montego Bay United as a striker.

== Career ==
=== Club ===
Williams has played senior club football for Village United, having previously played with Green Pond High and Montego Bay United. In 2012 Williams joined USL Pro Charleston Battery on loan. Williams joined Montego Bay United for the 2013-2014 RSPL season.

In February 2016, Williams joined Indy Eleven on loan for the 2016 season. Williams suffered a long-term injury while training with Indy and he was returned to Montego Bay United on 30 March 2016.

=== International career ===
He made his international debut for Jamaica in 2012.
