= Lovel Palmer =

Jamaican footballer (born 1984)

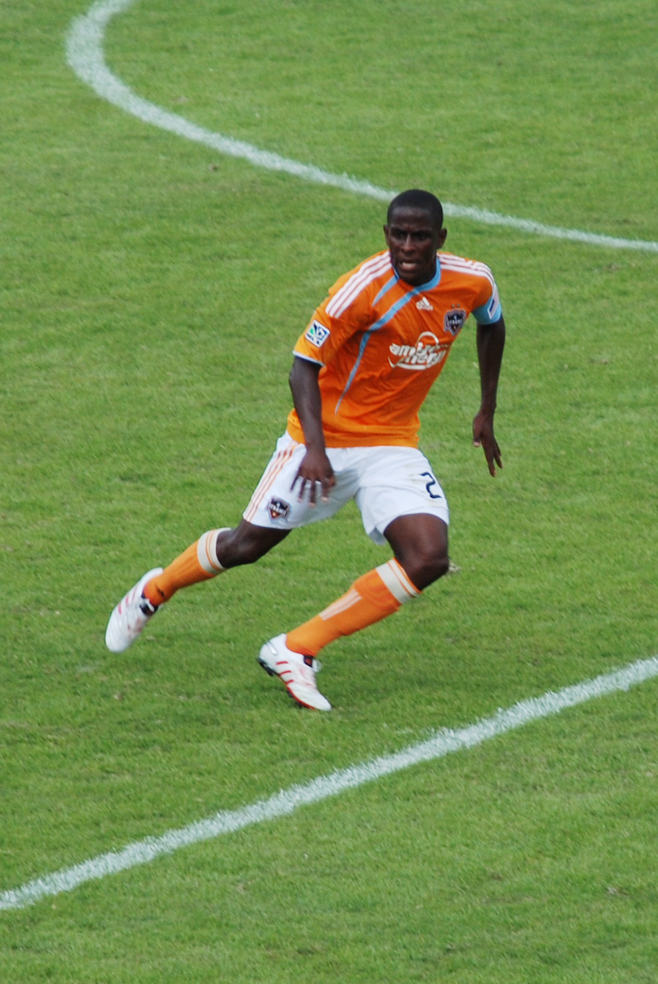
- Palmer with Houston Dynamo in 2010

Personal information
- Full name: Lovel Palmer
- Date of birth: 30 August 1984 (age 42)
- Place of birth: Mandeville, Jamaica
- Height: 5 ft 10 in (1.78 m)
- Positions: Right back; midfielder

Team information
- Current team: Harbour View
- Number: 44

Youth career
- 1995–1998: Essex Valley FC

Senior career*
Years	Team	Apps	(Gls)
1999–2010	Harbour View	143	(41)
2004	→ W Connection (loan)	11	(2)
2010–2011	Houston Dynamo	45	(3)
2011–2012	Portland Timbers	34	(0)
2013	Real Salt Lake	17	(0)
2014–2015	Chicago Fire	52	(1)
2016–2017	Indy Eleven	38	(1)
2017–2018	Miami FC	11	(0)
2018	Des Moines Menace	1	(0)
2021–	Harbour View	5	(0)

International career^{‡}
2005–2012	Jamaica	30	(0)
- * Club domestic league appearances and goals as of 11:43, 30 October 2017 (UTC) ‡ National team caps and goals as of 3 March 2011

Lovel Palmer (born 30 August 1984) is a Jamaican footballer who currently plays as a defender and midfielder for the Des Moines Menace in the Premier Development League.

== Career ==
=== Youth ===
Palmer began his career with the St. Elizabeth Technical High School football team in his native Jamaica, and in 1995 joined Essex Valley FC. In 1998, with Essex Valley, Palmer participated in an international youth tournament in Norway He also played in several youth teams for Essex Valley before joining the youth system of Harbour View in January 1999.

=== Club ===
Palmer won Premier League and Caribbean Club Championship titles in 1995 and 2004 with Harbour View, before joining TT Pro League team W Connection on loan. While at Harbour View, Palmer also had an unsuccessful trial with IK Start in Norway in February 2009.

During the 2004 season he appeared in eleven games and scored two goals for W Connection before returning to Harbour View in December 2004. Palmer soon became the leader and captain of Harbour View, and he led the team to victory in the Jamaica National Premier League in 2007/2008.

On 19 March 2010, Palmer and Harbour View completed a deal that sent Palmer to Houston Dynamo in Major League Soccer. The terms of the transfer were undisclosed.

On 21 July 2011, Palmer was traded to Portland Timbers along with Mike Chabala and an international roster spot in exchange for Adam Moffat and allocation money.

Palmer's option was declined by Portland on 3 December 2012. He elected to enter the 2012 MLS Re-Entry Draft and was selected by Real Salt Lake in stage two of the draft on 14 December 2012. He missed a penalty in a shootout during the 2013 MLS Cup that gave Sporting Kansas City the league title. Six days later he was traded by RSL to Chicago Fire in exchange for allocation money.

After two years in Chicago, Palmer signed with Indy Eleven of the North American Soccer League on 12 January 2016.

Palmer signed with NASL side Miami FC on 14 August 2017 following his release from Indy Eleven.

Palmer signed with USL PDL side Des Moines Menace in June 2018 following his departure from Miami FC. He left the club at the end of the season.

In June 2021, Palmer returned to professional football in the Jamaican Premier League with Harbour View.

=== International ===
Palmer played for the Jamaican U-17, U-20 and U-23 national teams, and has been a member of the Jamaica national football team since 2005.

== Career statistics ==
=== Club ===
As of match played 3 August 2016

Appearances and goals by club, season and competition
Club	Season	League			National Cup		Continental		Other		Total	
Club	Season	Division	Apps	Goals	Apps	Goals	Apps	Goals	Apps	Goals	Apps	Goals
Houston Dynamo	2010	MLS	26	2	2	1	-		-		28	3
Houston Dynamo	2011	MLS	19	1	1	0	-		-		20	1
Houston Dynamo	Total		45	3	3	1	-	-	-	-	48	4
Portland Timbers	2011	MLS	15	0	0	0	-		-		15	0
Portland Timbers	2012	MLS	19	0	0	0	-		-		19	0
Portland Timbers	Total		34	0	0	0	-	-	-	-	34	0
Real Salt Lake	2013	MLS	17	0	4	0	-		1	0	22	0
Chicago Fire	2014	MLS	30	1	2	0	-		-		32	1
Chicago Fire	2015	MLS	22	0	2	0	-		-		24	0
Chicago Fire	Total		52	1	4	0	-	-	-	-	56	1
Indy Eleven	2016	NASL	12	0	0	0	-		0	0	12	0
Career total			160	4	11	1	-	-	1	0	172	5

=== International ===
Jamaica national team
Year	Apps	Goals
2005	3	0
2006	0	0
2007	6	0
2008	0	0
2009	3	0
2010	6	0
2011	0	0
2012	8	0
Total	33	0

Statistics accurate as of match played 12 December 2012

== Personal ==
Palmer holds a U.S. green card which qualifies him as a domestic player for MLS roster purposes.

== Honors ==
=== Club ===
Harbour View

- Jamaica National Premier League (3): 2000, 2007, 2010
- JFF Champions Cup (2): 2001, 2002
- CFU Club Championship (2): 2004, 2007

Real Salt Lake

- Major League Soccer Western Conference Championship (1): 2013

Indy Eleven

- North American Soccer League Spring Season (1): 2016

Des Moines Menace

- USL League Two Regular Season Championship (1): 2018

=== International ===
Jamaica

- Caribbean Cup (1): 2010
