= Keith Cardona =

American soccer player (born 1992)

Personal information
- Full name: Keith Francis Cardona
- Date of birth: November 7, 1992 (age 34)
- Place of birth: Glen Rock, New Jersey, U.S.
- Height: 1.93 m (6 ft 4 in)
- Position: Goalkeeper

Youth career
- 2006–2010: New York Red Bulls

College career
Years	Team	Apps	(Gls)
2011–2012	Maryland Terrapins	24	(0)

Senior career*
Years	Team	Apps	(Gls)
2011–2013	New York Red Bulls U-23		
2014–2015	Liefering	0	(0)
2015–2017	Indy Eleven	15	(0)
2015	→ Wilmington Hammerheads (loan)	1	(0)

International career
- United States U17
- United States U18
- * Club domestic league appearances and goals as of 10:05, 30 October 2017 (UTC)

Keith Francis Cardona (born November 7, 1992) is an American professional soccer player.

== Career ==
=== Youth ===
Cardona grew up in Glen Rock, New Jersey and played soccer at Glen Rock High School before switching to a club team.

Cardona spent time playing with the academy of New York Red Bulls, before attending the University of Maryland in 2011, where he played for two years.

While at college and briefly afterwards, Cardona appeared for NPSL side New York Red Bulls U-23.

=== Professional ===
Cardona signed for second-division Austrian side FC Liefering in July 2014. Cardona later signed with North American Soccer League side Indy Eleven in March 2015.

== Career statistics ==
=== Club ===
As of match played 29 October 2016

Appearances and goals by club, season and competition
Club	Season	League			National Cup		Other		Total	
Club	Season	Division	Apps	Goals	Apps	Goals	Apps	Goals	Apps	Goals
Liefering	2014–15	Erste Liga	0	0	0	0	–		0	0
Indy Eleven	2015	NASL	10	0	0	0	–		10	0
Indy Eleven	2016	NASL	3	0	1	0	0	0	4	0
Indy Eleven	2016	NASL	2	0	1	0	–		3	0
Indy Eleven	Total		15	0	2	0	-	-	17	0
Wilmington Hammerheads (loan)	2015	USL	1	0	0	0	–		1	0
Career total			16	0	2	0	-	-	18	0
