= Souleymane Youla =

Guinean footballer

Personal information
- Full name: Souleymane Youla
- Date of birth: 29 November 1981 (age 44)
- Place of birth: Conakry, Guinea
- Height: 1.80 m (5 ft 11 in)
- Position: Striker

Senior career*
| Years | Team | Apps | (Gls) |
| 1999–2000 | Lokeren | 14 | (9) |
| 2000–2001 | Anderlecht | 15 | (1) |
| 2001–2005 | Gençlerbirliği | 112 | (49) |
| 2005–2007 | Beşiktaş | 13 | (2) |
| 2006–2007 | → Metz (loan) | 16 | (1) |
| 2007–2009 | Lille | 32 | (2) |
| 2008–2009 | → Eskişehirspor (loan) | 31 | (13) |
| 2009–2010 | Eskişehirspor | 14 | (3) |
| 2010–2011 | Denizlispor | 27 | (9) |
| 2012–2013 | Sint-Niklaas | 13 | (1) |
| 2013–2014 | Amiens | 5 | (0) |
| 2014 | Tournai | 11 | (4) |
| 2014–2016 | Budapest Honvéd | 55 | (14) |
| 2016 | Indy Eleven | 13 | (2) |
| 2017–2018 | Ronse | 26 | (13) |
| 2018–2019 | Sint-Eloois-Winkel | 26 | (8) |

International career
| 2000–2011 | Guinea | 36 | (13) |
- * Club domestic league appearances and goals as of 18:07, 4 February 2021 (UTC)

Souleymane Youla (born 29 November 1981) is a Guinean football player. He has Turkish citizenship with the name Süleyman Yula.

== Career ==
=== Club ===
Youla's professional career started in Belgium in 1999, when Lokeren signed him to replace the departed Jan Koller, who had moved to Anderlecht. Scoring 9 goals in 14 matches, Youla played a successful season, before also being signed by Anderlecht. At Anderlecht, he faced fierce competition in the likes of Koller, Tomasz Radzinski, Aruna Dindane and Oleg Iachtchouk. He only remained for one season but is remembered by Anderlecht fans for his injury time winner against PSV Eindhoven in the 2000–01 UEFA Champions League, allowing Anderlecht to qualify for the Round of 16 as group winners. Youla moved to Turkey where he signed for Gençlerbirliği SK and played five seasons as a first team player. He signed for Beşiktaş J.K., got much less playing time and was loaned out for one season to French side FC Metz. At Metz, he was noticed by Lille, who signed him in 2007. After again a season where he did not receive much opportunities, he was loaned out back to Turkish side Eskişehirspor where he partnered up with Ümit Karan. The following season, the transfer was made permanent. Thereafter, Youla enjoyed two more seasons in Turkey, with Denizlispor and Orduspor. Following the 2010–11 season, he stayed unemployed until November 2012, when he was hired by Belgian team Sint-Niklaas to help the team remain in the Belgian Second Division. On 11 June 2016, Youla signed for North American Soccer League side Indy Eleven.

=== International ===
He was part of the Guinean 2004 African Nations Cup team who finished second in their group in the first round of competition. The team progressed to the quarter finals, where they lost to Mali.

== Career statistics ==
As of match played 30 October 2016

Appearances and goals by club, season and competition
| Club | Season | League | | | National Cup | | League Cup | | Continental | | Other | | Total | |
| Club | Season | Division | Apps | Goals | Apps | Goals | Apps | Goals | Apps | Goals | Apps | Goals | Apps | Goals |
|---|---|---|---|---|---|---|---|---|---|---|---|---|---|---|
| Gençlerbirliği | 2001–02 | Süper Lig | 29 | 9 | 2 | 1 | – | | – | | – | | 24 | 2 |
| Gençlerbirliği | 2002–03 | Süper Lig | 26 | 11 | 4 | 3 | – | | – | | – | | 16 | 1 |
| Gençlerbirliği | 2003–04 | Süper Lig | 27 | 15 | 2 | 0 | – | | – | | – | | 16 | 1 |
| Gençlerbirliği | 2004–05 | Süper Lig | 30 | 14 | 1 | 0 | – | | – | | – | | 16 | 1 |
| Gençlerbirliği | Total | | 112 | 49 | 9 | 4 | - | - | - | - | - | - | 121 | 53 |
| Beşiktaş | 2005–06 | Süper Lig | 12 | 2 | 0 | 0 | – | | – | | – | | 12 | 2 |
| Metz (Loan) | 2006–07 | Ligue 2 | 16 | 1 | 0 | 0 | – | | – | | – | | 16 | 1 |
| Lille | 2006–07 | Ligue 1 | 16 | 2 | 0 | 0 | 2 | 0 | 6 | 0 | – | | 24 | 2 |
| Lille | 2007–08 | Ligue 1 | 15 | 0 | 0 | 0 | 1 | 1 | – | | – | | 16 | 1 |
| Lille | Total | | 31 | 2 | 0 | 0 | 3 | 1 | 6 | 0 | - | - | 40 | 3 |
| Eskişehirspor (Loan) | 2008–09 | Süper Lig | 31 | 13 | 2 | 1 | – | | – | | – | | 33 | 14 |
| Eskişehirspor | 2009–10 | Süper Lig | 14 | 3 | 0 | 0 | – | | – | | – | | 14 | 3 |
| Denizlispor | 2009–10 | Süper Lig | 14 | 3 | 3 | 0 | – | | – | | – | | 17 | 3 |
| Denizlispor | 2010–11 | TFF First League | 13 | 6 | 3 | 1 | – | | – | | – | | 16 | 7 |
| Denizlispor | Total | | 27 | 9 | 6 | 1 | - | - | - | - | - | - | 33 | 10 |
| Sportkring Sint-Niklaas | 2012–13 | Belgian Second Division | 13 | 1 | | | – | | – | | – | | 13 | 1 |
| Amiens | 2013–14 | Championnat National | 5 | 0 | 0 | 0 | – | | – | | – | | 5 | 0 |
| Tournai | 2013–14 | Belgian Third Division | 11 | 4 | | | – | | – | | – | | 11 | 4 |
| Budapest Honvéd | 2014–15 | Nemzeti Bajnokság I | 26 | 9 | 1 | 0 | 2 | 3 | – | | – | | 29 | 12 |
| Budapest Honvéd | 2015–16 | Nemzeti Bajnokság I | 29 | 5 | 2 | 1 | 0 | 0 | – | | – | | 31 | 6 |
| Budapest Honvéd | Total | | 55 | 14 | 3 | 1 | 2 | 3 | - | - | - | - | 60 | 18 |
| Indy Eleven | 2016 | NASL | 13 | 2 | 1 | 0 | – | | – | | – | | 14 | 2 |
| Career total | | | 340 | 100 | 21 | 7 | 5 | 4 | 6 | 0 | - | - | 372 | 111 |

=== International ===
Guinea national team
| Year | Apps | Goals |
|---|---|---|
| 2000 | 4 | 4 |
| 2001 | 1 | 0 |
| 2002 | 2 | 0 |
| 2003 | 2 | 1 |
| 2004 | 9 | 1 |
| 2005 | 1 | 0 |
| 2006 | 3 | 0 |
| 2007 | 4 | 0 |
| 2008 | 5 | 5 |
| 2009 | 5 | 2 |
| Total | 36 | 13 |

Statistics accurate as of match played 14 November 2009

=== International goals ===
| # | Date | Venue | Opponent | Score | Result | Competition |
|---|---|---|---|---|---|---|
| 1. | 8 March 2000 | Nakivubo Stadium, Kampala, Uganda | Uganda | 2–0 | 4-4 | 2002 FIFA World Cup qualification |
| 2. | 8 March 2000 | Nakivubo Stadium, Kampala, Uganda | Uganda | 3–3 | 4-4 | 2002 FIFA World Cup qualification |
| 3. | 2000 | | | – | | |
| 4. | 2000 | | | – | | |
| 5. | 16 November 2003 | Estádio da Machava, Maputo, Mozambique | Mozambique | 1–0 | 4–3 | 2006 FIFA World Cup qualification |
| 6. | 5 September 2004 | Stade 28 Septembre, Conakry, Guinea | Botswana | 2–0 | 4–0 | 2006 FIFA World Cup qualification |
| 7. | 11 January 2008 | Estadio Francisco Pérez, Estepona, Spain | Sudan | 2–0 | 6–0 | Friendly |
| 8. | 11 January 2008 | Estadio Francisco Pérez, Estepona, Spain | Sudan | 3–0 | 6–0 | Friendly |
| 9. | 11 January 2008 | Estadio Francisco Pérez, Estepona, Spain | Sudan | 4–0 | 6–0 | Friendly |
| 10. | 11 January 2008 | Estadio Francisco Pérez, Estepona, Spain | Sudan | 5–0 | 6–0 | Friendly |
| 11. | 28 January 2008 | Sekondi-Takoradi Stadium, Sekondi-Takoradi, Ghana | Namibia | 1–1 | Draw | 2008 Africa Cup of Nations |
| 12. | 12 August 2009 | International Stadium, Cairo, Egypt | Egypt | 1–1 | 3–3 | Friendly |
| 13. | 12 August 2009 | International Stadium, Cairo, Egypt | Egypt | 2–2 | 3–3 | Friendly |
Statistics accurate as of match played 14 November 2009
