= Broomfield Soccer Club =

Association football club in Colorado, United States

- Full name: Broomfield Soccer Club
- Nickname: Blast
- Founded: August 1, 1974; 52 years ago as ‘’Broomfield Junior Soccer Club'’
- Ground: Broomfield County Commons, Broomfield, Colorado
- Executive Director: Mike Schrad
- President: Peter Soeth
- Director of Coaching: Liam Sinclair (Boys), David Castro (Girls)
- League: Colorado Soccer Association (CSA), Girls Academy, MLS Next 2, Development Player League, National Premier League
- Website: http://www.broomfieldsoccerclub.org/

Broomfield Junior Soccer Club (BJSC), commonly known as Broomfield Soccer Club (BSC), is a youth association football (aka soccer) club based in Broomfield, Colorado, USA.

== Club structure ==
BSC is an independent 501(c)(3) non-profit corporation which provides recreational, competitive and academy level soccer programs for the boys and girls of Broomfield as well as those of surrounding communities. The club provides for the administration of the programs as well as the recruitment of coaches, referees, and players. Most of BSC's activities are managed by paid staff with strategic oversight provided by a Board of Directors elected from the Club's membership.

BSC's recreational and competitive programs are affiliated with Colorado Soccer Association (CSA). BSC's academy programs field teams in the Girls Academy and Development Player League on the girls' side, and MLS Next 2 and National Premier League on the boys' side. These leagues are sanctioned by United States Youth Soccer (USYS), United States Sports Specialty Association (USSSA), and/or US Club Soccer, all of which report to the United States Soccer Federation (USSF), which is the governing body for soccer in the United States. In turn, US Soccer is affiliated with the Federal International Football Association (FIFA), the international governing body for soccer.

Operationally, BSC is divided into several components:

- Recreational: BSC operates a fall and spring season each year for youth ages 3–14. The program is divided into single year age groups by gender (e.g. U8 Girls, U8 Boys, etc.). At the younger age groups the emphasis is on learning body movement, technique, basic soccer tactics and sportsmanship. Teams compete in age-specific intra-club leagues through U8, then have the option of playing in the CSA Front Range League. All coaches in the recreational program are volunteer coaches. Part of BSC's success is due to the numerous volunteers who give their time to help Broomfield youth learn to play the world's favorite past time. Many of the Club's volunteer coaches are parents who start with little or no soccer experience and progress with their children to become both knowledgeable and enthusiastic about the game. The Junior Academy Program for U9 and U10 players who are interested in additional training and higher level play is housed in the Recreational program. These teams play in the higher level CSA administered U9 and U10 "Intermediate" recreational leagues. The Junior Academy Program provides paid, professional coaches. Game results and league tables are not kept. After U10, the Recreational leagues are consolidated as there are far fewer teams since most players make the transition at U11 into Competitive soccer.
- Competitive: BSC provides the opportunity for Competitive soccer play for advanced players age 10 and up. The teams compete in various Advanced State League divisions in CSA with Centennial League divisions and Premier League divisions at the top of the league structure (similar to how professional league tiers are arranged in much of the world). Game results and league tables are maintained and there is an annual promotion/relegation scheme in place to balance the level of competition in each division.
- Academy: BSC provides elite, academy level programming for its U13 and older players. These teams compete in various national level leagues with extensive travel, including the Girls Academy and MLS Next 2. The focus of these leagues is in competing at the highest possible level in preparation for opportunities to continue play at the next level, whether that be in college, professional and/or national team.
- Tournaments: Each August, BSC hosts the Broomfield Shootout, one of the largest and best organized pre-season tournaments in Colorado. The tournament, which began in 2005, hosts between 250-300 teams annually. Age groups include U9-U14 boys and U9-U19 girls. The main tournament site is the Broomfield Commons, with 18-20 fields, and several other complexes in the Broomfield area. BSC occasionally hosts additional spring, summer and winter tournaments as well.
- Camps: BSC hosts three camps each summer, as well as several each winter depending on available space. All camps are well attended by both players from within the club as well as novice players and players from surrounding communities.

== Club Motto ==
In March 2010, the Club officially adopted the following motto:

- Honor the Game. Believe in Yourself. Play with Passion. Achieve your Dreams.

This motto reflects the club's commitment to fair play, enjoyment of the game and dual development of players’ soccer and life skills.

== History ==
=== Early Years: 1974-2006 ===
Formed in August 1974, BSC is one of Colorado's oldest soccer clubs with only a handful of clubs such as Denver Kickers (est 1962) and Skyline Soccer Association (est 1967) having a longer history. The club's original membership that first season included less than 20 players.

After almost 12 years of operation, the club incorporated as a Colorado non-profit in June 1986.

=== Modern Era: 2007-Present ===
For several years after reorganizing as a non-profit, the Recreational and Competitive programs were operated completely independent of one another including separate boards. As part of a strategy developed in December 2007, the Club embarked upon a process to re-unify the boards and more tightly couple the programs. In September 2009, revised by-laws were put into effect which formally re-unified the Club under a single nine-member board of directors. For Club membership, this was a big step forward because it simplified the operating structure and meant younger players (and their coaches) in the Recreational program would have greater access to the player development expertise of the Competitive program.

Additionally, the reunification set in motion three key changes. The first was the hiring of the Club's first Executive Director (ED), Michael King, in Oct 2010. A paid position, the Executive Director was charged with all aspects of running both the Recreational and Competitive sides of the club. Previously, the Recreational portion of the club had largely been operated by volunteers with part-time employees supporting certain activities. Given that by 2008 the Recreational area had grown to 1,500+ players, the addition of an ED was long over due. The second change was a direct outcome of the first. With an Executive Director in place, the club's board began to transition to a higher level, more strategic type of organization looking to the future of the club including assessing and assembling plans to remain competitive and relevant in Denver metro soccer scene.

The final key change was the hiring of a new Director of Coaching (DOC), Tim Hankinson in 2010 to mentor and develop not only Competitive coaches (which had been the remit of prior DOCs), but Recreational coaches as well. A former head coach for MLS's Colorado Rapids, Hankinson's international background working with professional and collegiate players brought a great deal of expertise and positive exposure to the club.

Hankinson was not the first person formerly associated with the Colorado Rapids to hold the DOC post. For a brief time in 2004, former US MNT player Marcelo Balboa was the Club's DOC, but soon departed to return to the Rapids for a front office post. Coincidentally, Hankinson and Balboa also had a history. Their paths crossed for one season in 2001, Hankinson's first year with the Rapids and Balboa's last. In Jan 2002 Balboa was traded by the Rapids to the NY / NJ MetroStars (now known as the New York Red Bulls) while Hankinson continued on with the Rapids for three additional seasons.

Following a productive year with Broomfield SC, Hankinson received an offer he could not refuse. On 14 Sep 2011, Hankinson was announced as the first head coach for San Antonio Scorpions FC of the North American Soccer League (NASL). After a deliberate search, a new DOC was appointed by the club and on 09 Nov 2011, Liam Sinclair took the reins as DOC. A lifelong player, Sinclair grew up near Milton Keynes, UK and learned the game within the English youth system in the academies of professional clubs Derby County F.C. and Luton Town F.C. while also playing for county and regional select squads. With a remit similar to the prior DOC's, Sinclair's tasks included not only coach development, but future maturation of the club's player development philosophy and system. Additional coaching expertise was soon added with Kevin Comer joining the Club on 01 Mar 2012 as Academy Director and David Castro quickly following on 30 Mar 2012 as Assistant DOC.

Soon after his hiring, Castro was moved into the role of Girls DOC, with Sinclair taking on the boys side of the club. Castro quickly led the girls side of the club to extensive success including several State Cup titles, eventually leading to the development of the Academy program for the girls, and an invitation into the prestigious Girls Academy league. In his time as Girls DOC, the club has seen a large number of players find success playing in various college programs.

As the Club continued to change and expand, so did its staff with Mike King stepping down on 30 Jan 2013 following two years at the helm. After a search process, Sandie Hammerly was appointed the Club's 2nd Executive Director on 1 Apr 2013 bringing to the Club extensive non-profit sports experience (including posts with USA Ultimate and USA Field Hockey). After 15 months with the organization, Hammerly departed on 31 May 2015 with Jon Pasquini briefly holding the post from 6 Oct 2014 to 20 Feb 2015.

Longtime Broomfield SC coach, Broomfield Shootout tournament director, and two time "Volunteer of the Year (2012 and 2014)," Mike Schrad stepped in as the Interim Executive Director in Feb 2015 with that post becoming a permanent assignment on 1 Sep 2015. Schrad continues in this position today. During his tenure, the club has seen expansion into the Academy level of youth soccer, continued growth, the first full kit sponsor (Children's Hospital Colorado) and great stability in programming and staffing. In July 2024, Schrad was appointed, and in February 2025 elected, as the President of Colorado Soccer Association, becoming the first sitting club executive to hold that position.

=== Board Leadership ===
As part of becoming a nonprofit, the club adopted bylaws and elected a Board of Directors led by the president. The following table lists the club's current and past presidents.

Period	Recreational	Competitive
2003-2005	Steve Reynolds	-
2005	Steve Reynolds	Verlan Stephens
2006	Greg Stokes	Mark Wolf
2007	Randall Brogle	Tokunbu Akindele / Sunil Narang
2008	Daniel Carpenter	Sunil Narang
2009	Mark Schieffer	Michael Moroze
Reunification
2010-2011	Michael Moroze	
2012	Gene Jewell / Jon Schnoor	
2013	Jon Schnoor	
2014	John Ball / David Stover	
2015-2019	David Stover	
2019-2022	Tony Scott	
2022–Present	Peter Soeth	

=== National Appearances ===
2018 - U17 '01 Girls Prestige Presidents Cup National Finalist

2024 - U14 '10 Girls Academy 3rd Place National GA Playoffs

=== State Cup, Presidents Cup & Centennial Cup ===
==== 2010-11 ====
- Presidents Cup Champions: U16B '95 Red

==== 2012-13 ====
- Presidents Cup Finalists: U13G '00 Red

==== 2013-14 ====
- State Cup Finalists: U12B '02 Red, U18G '96 Red
- Presidents Cup Champions: U11G '03 Red, U14G '00 Red

==== 2014-15 ====
- State Cup Champions: U14G '01 Red, U17G '98 Red
- Presidents Cup Champions: U12B '03 Red, U13G '02 Red
- Presidents Cup Finalists: U15G '00 Red

==== 2015-16 ====
- State Cup Champions: U15G '01 Prestige, U18G '98 Prestige
- Presidents Cup Finalists: U16G '00 Prestige

==== 2016-17 ====
- State Cup Champions: U16G '01 Prestige
- Presidents Cup Champions: U16G '01 Magista

==== 2017-18 ====
- State Cup Champions: U17 '01 Girls Prestige
- State Cup Finalists: U13 '05 Girls Prestige, U18 '00 Girls Prestige, U19 '99 Girls Prestige
- Presidents Cup Finalists: U13 '05 Girls Magista, U17 '01 Girls Magista, U18 '00 Girls Magista

==== 2018-19 ====
- State Cup Champions: U13 '06 Boys Prestige, U19 '00 Girls Prestige, U14 '05 Boys Prestige
- State Cup Finalists: U18 '01 Girls Prestige, U14 '05 Girls Prestige
- Presidents Cup Champions: U18 '01 Girls Magista, U16 '03 Boys Magista
- Centennial Cup Champions: U18 '01 Girls Tiempo

==== 2019-20 ====
- State Cup Champions: U18 '02 Girls Prestige, U15 '05 Girls Prestige
- State Cup Finalists: U14 '06 Boys Prestige
- Centennial Cup Champions: U17 '03 Girls Thunder

==== 2020-21 ====
- State Cup Champions: U18 '03 Boys Prestige
- State Cup Finalists: U14 '07 Girls Prestige
- Presidents Cup Champions: U15 '06 Girls Extreme

==== 2021-22 ====
- Presidents Cup Champions: U18 '04 Girls Extreme
- Presidents Cup Finalists: U15 '07 Boys Prestige

==== 2022-23 ====
- State Cup Champions: U11 '12 Girls Prestige
- Centennial Cup Champions: U12 '11 Boys Extreme
- Centennial Cup Finalists: U19 '04/'05 Boys Prestige

==== 2023-24 ====
- State Cup Finalists: U15 '09 Boys Academy, U18/U19 '05/'06 Boys Academy
- Presidents Cup Champions: U12 '12 Boys Prestige
- Centennial Cup Champions: U16 '08 Girls Extreme
- Centennial Cup Finalists: U13/U14 '10 Boys Prestige, U15 '09 Girls Extreme

==== 2024-25 ====
- State Cup Finalists: U11 '14 Girls Prestige
- Presidents Cup Champions: U16 '09 Boys Academy
- Presidents Cup Finalists: U11 '15 Girls Prestige (Playing Up), U15 '10 Boys Academy
- Centennial Cup Finalists: U16 '09 Boys Extreme
- Centennial Cup Champions: U12 '13 Girls Extreme, U15 '10 Boys Prestige, U18/U19 '06/'07 Boys Prestige

== Crest and colors ==
In the spring of 2008, the club rebranded and adopted its current shield logo for both Recreational and Competitive.

The club's official colors are Red and Black.

== Kit manufacturers ==
=== Recreational manufacturers and sponsors ===
Period	Kit manufacturer	Sponsor
? to Spring 2008	CS Vici	None
Fall 2008–Spring 2015	Adidas	None
Fall 2015–Spring 2019	Nike	None
Fall 2019–Present	Adidas	None

=== Competitive manufacturers and sponsors ===
Period	Kit manufacturer	Sponsor
? to Spring 2004	Puma	None
Fall 2004–Spring 2015	Adidas	None
Fall 2015–Spring 2019	Nike	None
Fall 2019–Present	Adidas	None
