= Neil Shaffer =

American soccer player (born 1989)

Personal information
- Date of birth: February 14, 1989 (age 37)
- Place of birth: Aliquippa, Pennsylvania, United States
- Height: 5 ft 10 in (1.78 m)
- Position: Midfielder

Team information
- Current team: Tartan Devils Oak Avalon

Youth career
- 2007–2010: Robert Morris Colonials

Senior career*
Years	Team	Apps	(Gls)
2010	Erie Admirals		
2011–2012	Pittsburgh Riverhounds	31	(1)
2013	Kitsap Pumas	14	(5)
2014–2015	Harrisburg City Islanders	49	(1)
2016	Indy Eleven	2	(0)
2016	→ Harrisburg City Islanders (loan)	2	(0)
- * Club domestic league appearances and goals as of November 3, 2016

Neil Shaffer (born February 14, 1989) is an American retired soccer player. He plays for amateur Pittsburgh side Tartan Devils Oak Avalon.

== Career ==
=== College and amateur ===
Shaffer was born in Aliquippa, Pennsylvania. He attended Beaver High School and played four years of college soccer at the Robert Morris University. Following his senior season, Shaffer was named to the NSCAA Men's Division I All-North Atlantic Region Third Team and to the All-Northeast Conference Second Team. He finished his college career with 13 goals and nine assists for 35 career points.

During his college years, Shaffer also played for Erie Admirals in the National Premier Soccer League.

=== Professional ===
Undrafted out of college, Shaffer turned professional in 2011 when he signed for the Pittsburgh Riverhounds of the USL Professional Division. He made his professional debut on May 21, 2011, in a game against F.C. New York.

==== Kitsap Pumas ====
In 2013 Shaffer scored 5 goals in 14 appearances for the USL PDL side.

==== Harrisburg City Islanders ====
After a productive 2013 season Shaffer signed with the USL side and helped the team make it to the USL-PRO Championship Game.

==== Indy Eleven ====
On December 23, 2015, Shaffer signed with the NASL side, Indy Eleven

On 6 May 2016, Shaffer was loaned back to Harrisburg City Islanders for their weekend series of games against FC Cincinnati and Charleston Battery on 7th and 9 May.
