= Éamon Zayed =

Irish-Libyan footballer and coach (born 1983)

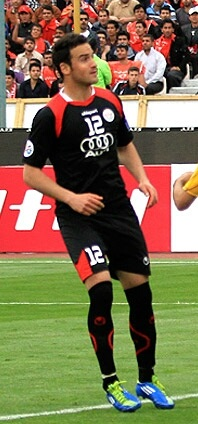
- Zayed with Persepolis in 2012

Personal information
- Date of birth: 4 October 1983 (age 43)
- Place of birth: Dublin, Ireland
- Height: 1.88 m (6 ft 2 in)
- Position: Forward

Team information
- Current team: Corpus Christi FC (Head Coach & Sporting Director)

Youth career
- 2000–2002: Leicester City

Senior career*
Years	Team	Apps	(Gls)
2002–2006	Bray Wanderers	105	(54)
2004	→ Crewe Alexandra (loan)	0	(0)
2005	→ Aalesunds (loan)	1	(0)
2006–2008	Drogheda United	71	(47)
2008–2010	Sporting Fingal	39	(21)
2011	Derry City	36	(22)
2011–2013	Persepolis	15	(7)
2013	Aluminium Hormozgan	8	(1)
2013–2014	Shamrock Rovers	22	(4)
2014	→ Sligo Rovers (loan)	11	(5)
2014–2015	Sabah	21	(11)
2016–2017	Indy Eleven	59	(26)
2018	Charlotte Independence	25	(8)
2019–2020	Chattanooga Red Wolves	19	(6)
Total		441	(226)

International career
2003	Republic of Ireland U20	4	(0)
2003–2004	Republic of Ireland U21	6	(0)
2011–2015	Libya	8	(1)

Managerial career
- 2021–2024: Northern Colorado Hailstorm
- 2025–: Corpus Christi FC
Medal record
Men's football
Representing Libya
Arab Cup
Runner-up	2012 Saudi Arabia
- * Club domestic league appearances and goals

Éamon Zayed (Arabic: أیمن زايد; born 4 October 1983) is a former professional footballer and current head coach and sporting director for Corpus Christi FC. He played as a forward. Born in the Republic of Ireland, he represented the Libya national team as a player.

Zayed gained international fame on 2 February 2012 after scoring a hat-trick in the final ten minutes of the Tehran derby against Esteghlal in a match where Persepolis were one man down and losing 2–0 until the 82nd minute, and which was later referred to as "10 minutes with 10 men" or "10–10–3".

== Youth career ==
Zayed started his career with Broadford Rovers before moving to St. Joseph's Boys AFC, based in Sallynoggin, Dublin. While with the club, Zayed was selected at U-16 and U-17 levels for both the Leinster Schoolboys and Dublin teams, and was on the Leinster Schools team at U-17. In two years at Leicester City, he played for their youth (U-18), U-19 and Reserve sides. He then returned to Ireland after Leicester's relegation from the English Premiership in 2002.

== Senior club career ==
=== Bray Wanderers ===
Zayed joined Bray Wanderers and after impressing in the Under-21s, Zayed soon graduated to the senior team making his League of Ireland debut on 18 October 2002 at the Carlisle Grounds. He scored the fastest hat-trick ever by a Bray Wanderers player against Dundalk in 2003 within a nine-minute spell from the 7th to the 15th minute.

Zayed signed for Crewe Alexandra in February 2004 on loan, but returned to Bray in May without having made a first team appearance at Gresty Road. Zayed was the PFAI Young Player of the Year for 2003. He represented the Eircom League Under-21s in a four nations tournament in Scotland in May 2004 and earned his second U-21 international cap against Scotland in May 2004 in Galway. In October 2004, Zayed became the first Bray player to score four goals in one match, in a 5–3 win over Athone Town. He again left Bray on loan in August 2005, this time for Aalesunds in Norway. He made one appearance for the club, coming on as a substitute in a 4–1 defeat by Molde.

=== Drogheda United ===
Zayed signed for Drogheda United in July 2006 on a two and a half-year full-time contract, and scored on his debut on 7 July. His first of 5 goals in the Europa League came in a 1–1 draw with IK Start in August 2006. The following season he scored at A.C. Libertas. His third Drogheda goal in European competition came against Helsingborgs IF. He was a key part of the Drogheda team that won their first League of Ireland title in 2007 and finished as their top scorer.

=== Sporting Fingal ===
In the midst of great financial uncertainty at Drogheda at the end of the 2008 season, Zayed was released from his contract. He went on trial at Incheon United in the K-League, but eventually decided to remain in Ireland and moved to Sporting Fingal in January 2009. He scored twice against his former club Bray in Fingal's 4–2 FAI Cup semi-final victory in October 2009. He also scored twice against C.S. Marítimo in July 2010 in Sporting Fingal's European debut. He was released by Sporting Fingal at the end of the 2010 season. He was set to sign for Al Ahly in the Libyan Premier League, but the transfer was blocked following the introduction of a new rule preventing foreign-born Libyan internationals under the age of 30 from playing in the league.

=== Derry City ===
Zayed joined Derry City in January 2011 on a free transfer, signing a one-year contract. In his first season at Derry, Zayed finished as the league's top scorer with 23 goals (helping the club to European qualification), and also scored the winner in the Candystripes' League Cup final victory over Cork City. Zayed gained himself a place in the Premier Division team of the season, and went on to win the PFAI Players' Player of the Year award.

At the end of the 2012 League of Ireland season Zayed is joint twenty fourth in the all-time League of Ireland goalscoring list with 118 league goals

=== Persepolis ===
On 23 December 2011, Zayed signed a six-month contract with Iran Pro League side, Persepolis. He wore the number 12 shirt.

On 2 February 2012, he came on as a substitute in his first appearance, in the Tehran derby with Persepolis being reduced to 10 men and 2–0 behind, he scored in the 82nd minute to make it 2–1 with a right-footed curling shot. Two minutes later, he headed home an angled cross to level the game. In the 92nd minute of the match Zayed put Persepolis into a 3–2 lead in dramatic style to be the first non-Iranian player to net a hat-trick in the Tehran derby. He was voted World Player of the Week after the Tehran derby by Goal.com.

On 21 March 2012, Zayed scored a second hat-trick against Al-Shabab in AFC Champions League. This was the first hat-trick a Persepolis player had scored in the AFC Champions League. Persepolis won the game 6–1. Zayed scored another hat-trick against Rah Ahan F.C. on 6 May 2012. Persepolis fans then began referring to Zayed as "Mr. hat-trick". Due to his great performances and popularity with the fans, Persepolis extended his contract for the new season 2012–2013. However, he decided to leave his team before end of the season and on 24 November 2012, Perspolis and Zayed officially agreed to cancel his contract.

=== Aluminium Hormozgan ===
On 11 January 2013, Zayed joined another Iranian club, Aluminium Hormozgan and signed a contract with this team until the end of the season.

=== Shamrock Rovers ===
On 3 July 2013, Zayed made a return to the League of Ireland when he signed an 18-month contract with Shamrock Rovers. He made his debut in a friendly against Birmingham City. He scored his first league goal for Rovers on 16 July.

==== Sligo Rovers (loan) ====
On 31 July 2014, Zayed joined Sligo Rovers on loan until the end of the season.

=== Sabah FA ===
In December 2014, Zayed joined Sabah FA. On 6 February 2015, Eamon scored his first goal against Kuala Lumpur SPA bringing the team towards victory.

=== Indy Eleven ===
On 23 December 2015, Zayed signed with the NASL side, Indy Eleven. On 16 April 2016, Zayed scored two late goals against the New York Cosmos, leading his side to a 2–1 victory, and earning Player of the Week honors. On 11 June, Zayed scored a hat-trick in the final game of the Spring season, a 4–1 victory over the Carolina RailHawks. This result evened the Eleven and the Cosmos atop the table on goals scored and allowed, with Indy holding the tiebreaker based on their head-to-head result with New York.

=== Charlotte Independence ===
On 23 March 2018, Zayed signed with USL side Charlotte Independence for the 2018 season.

=== Chattanooga Red Wolves ===
On 24 October 2018, it was announced that Zayed would join USL League One side Chattanooga Red Wolves SC ahead of their inaugural season in 2019.

== International career ==
=== Republic of Ireland ===
Zayed was eligible to play international football for Republic of Ireland, Tunisia, as a result of his father, and Libya, as a result of his grandparents, however he chose to begin his international career with Ireland. Zayed made his international debut for the Irish U-20s against South Korea in January 2003 in a pre-World Cup tournament and followed up with two goals against the United Arab Emirates two days later in a 3–2 win. He made his U-21 debut for Ireland against Poland in a 5–1 away win in August 2003. Zayed played in all four of Ireland's games in the 2003 FIFA World Youth Championship, held in the UAE, starting two and making two appearances as a substitute. Following the tournament, he was contacted by both the Tunisian and Libyan FAs with a view to declaring for either, however, Zayed declined as he wanted to pursue his dream of representing Ireland at senior level.

=== Libya ===
With no further caps at underage level for Ireland, and the chances of him receiving any senior caps looking slim, Zayed declared for Libya in October 2010. He received his first call up to the Libyan national team from Brazilian coach, Marcos Paquetá, for an African Cup of Nations qualifier against Zambia in the same month. He made his debut a few weeks later in a friendly against Niger. After impressing on his debut, Zayed was called up to Libya's 23-man training squad for the 2012 Africa Cup of Nations in November 2011. He went on to play in the 2011 Pan Arab Games in Doha, Qatar, gaining three caps against Sudan, Palestine and Jordan. He scored his first goal for his country on 4 September 2013 against Equatorial Guinea in an international friendly, scoring the Libyan goal of the 1–1 draw.

== Coaching career ==
On 11 August 2021, Zayed was hired as the first-ever head coach of Northern Colorado Hailstorm FC, which began playing in USL League One, starting in the 2022 season. He possesses a UEFA "A" coaching license. Zayed departed as head coach after the Hailstorm left League One.

On October 15, 2025, Zayed was announced as the head coach and sporting director of Corpus Christi FC, an expansion team that joined USL League One for the 2026 season.

== Personal life ==
Zayed's father is Libyan and his mother is Irish. His younger brother has played for UCD in the 2012–13 FAI U19 League.

== Career statistics ==
=== International goals ===
Score and Result list Libya's goal tally first.

No.	Date	Venue	Opponent	Score	Result	Competition	Ref.
1.	4 September 2013	Estadio de Malabo, Malabo, Equatorial Guinea	Equatorial Guinea	1–1	1–1	Friendly	Equatorial Guinea vs. Libya (1:1)

== Honours ==
Drogheda United

- League of Ireland: 2007
- Setanta Sports Cup: 2007

Sporting Fingal

- FAI Cup: 2009

Derry City

- League of Ireland Cup: 2011

Libya

- Arab Cup: runner-up, 2012

Individual

- PFAI Players' Player of the Year: 2011
- PFAI Young Player of the Year: 2003
