= Daniel Keller =

American soccer player

Personal information
- Date of birth: February 7, 1992 (age 34)
- Place of birth: Carmel, Indiana, United States
- Height: 1.82 m (5 ft 11 1/2 in)
- Positions: Defender; midfielder

Youth career
- 2011–2014: Louisville Cardinals

Senior career*
Years	Team	Apps	(Gls)
2012–2014	Chicago Fire U-23	27	(1)
2015–2017	Indy Eleven	48	(0)
- * Club domestic league appearances and goals as of 10:10, October 30, 2017 (UTC)

Daniel Keller (born February 7, 1992) is an American professional soccer player who plays as a defender.

== Career ==
=== Youth ===
Keller played four years of college soccer at the University of Louisville between 2011 and 2014.

While at college, Keller appeared for USL PDL side Chicago Fire U-23 in 2012, 2013 and 2014.

=== Professional ===
On January 21, 2015, Keller was selected 62nd overall in the 2015 MLS SuperDraft by LA Galaxy.

Keller signed for North American Soccer League side Indy Eleven on May 11, 2015.
