= Jair Reinoso =

Bolivian footballer (born 1985)

Personal information
- Full name: Jair Alexander Reinoso Moreno
- Date of birth: 7 June 1985 (age 41)
- Place of birth: Cali, Colombia
- Height: 1.80 m (5 ft 11 in)
- Position: Striker

Team information
- Current team: Aurora
- Number: 18

Youth career
- América de Cali

Senior career*
Years	Team	Apps	(Gls)
2006	Tiro Federal	0	(0)
2008–2009	Bolívar	24	(8)
2010–2012	Aurora	70	(37)
2011	→ Shenzhen Ruby (loan)	0	(0)
2012	Once Caldas	23	(9)
2013	Cúcuta Deportivo	7	(3)
2013–2014	The Strongest	34	(16)
2014–2015	Cobreloa	15	(9)
2015	Harbin Yiteng	11	(5)
2016	Indy Eleven	10	(2)
2017–2018	San José	82	(38)
2019–2023	The Strongest	135	(67)
2023–	Aurora	73	(37)

International career^{‡}
2023–	Bolivia	4	(0)
- * Club domestic league appearances and goals as of 16:30, 26 March 2024 (UTC) ‡ National team caps and goals as of 16:30, 26 March 2024 (UTC)

Jair Alexander Reinoso Moreno (Spanish pronunciation: [ɟʝaˈiɾ rejˈnoso]; born 7 June 1985) is a professional footballer who plays as a striker for Bolivian Primera División club Aurora. Born in Colombia, he represents the Bolivia national team.

== Early years ==
At 15 years of age he migrated to the United States, and although he had had a passion for football since childhood, it was there that he began to realize his goals and came to be recognized at an international level.

== First division debut ==
His debut in the first division came with Bolivian club Bolívar in the year 2008. Although he had been already a player for Tiro Federal in the Argentine first division, he didn't have the opportunity to make his debut in an official game.

== International career ==
Born in Colombia, Reinoso was naturalized as Bolivian in October 2023 after nearly 15 years associated with the country. He was called up to the Bolivia national team for a set of 2026 FIFA World Cup qualification matches in November 2023.

== Titles ==
- 2009 Aerosur Cup - Club Bolívar
- 2009 Apertura - Club Bolívar
- 2013 Apertura - Club The Strongest
