= Duke Lacroix =

Haitian footballer (born 1993)

Personal information
- Full name: Markhus Lacroix
- Date of birth: 14 October 1993 (age 33)
- Place of birth: New Egypt, New Jersey, United States
- Height: 1.75 m (5 ft 9 in)
- Positions: Full back; winger

Team information
- Current team: Colorado Springs Switchbacks
- Number: 14

College career
Years	Team	Apps	(Gls)
2011–2014	Penn Quakers		

Senior career*
Years	Team	Apps	(Gls)
2012–2013	Ocean City Nor'easters	21	(4)
2015–2016	Indy Eleven	34	(3)
2017	Orange County SC	5	(2)
2018–2019	Reno 1868	59	(4)
2020	Charlotte Independence	16	(0)
2021–2022	Sacramento Republic	60	(2)
2023–	Colorado Springs Switchbacks	89	(2)

International career^{‡}
2024–	Haiti	18	(3)
- * Club domestic league appearances and goals as of 19:50, 8 November 2026 (UTC) ‡ National team caps and goals as of 4 October 2026

Markhus "Duke" Lacroix (born 14 October 1993) is a professional footballer who plays as a full-back for Colorado Springs Switchbacks in the USL Championship. Born in the United States, he plays for the Haiti national team.

== Club career ==
=== Youth ===
Lacroix grew up in the New Egypt section of Plumsted Township, New Jersey. He attended the Lawrenceville School, where he played soccer and ran track. The native of New Egypt, N.J., attended The Lawrenceville School, where he played four years of soccer and ran three years of track his high school, his tenure as a runner including a 4x400 relay win at the prestigious Penn Relays. He was a member of the U.S. Under-14 and Under-15 Boys National Teams and was also a member of the U.S. Under-18 Men's National Team player pool following his time in New Jersey's Olympic Development Program.

He played four years of college soccer at the University of Pennsylvania between 2011 and 2014. While at the University of Pennsylvania, the two-time captain served as one of only three players in school history to receive four All-Ivy League honors (First-team honoree in 2013 & 2014, Second-team in 2012 and Honorable Mention in 2011). He was also the only Quakers player ever to be named both the Ivy League's Rookie of the Year (2011) and an Ivy League Player of the Year (Offensive POY in 2013). Lacroix graduated with the third most appearances in Penn history with 68, during which he racked up the fifth most points with 65, coming from 25 goals and 15 assists – including seven goals and an Ivy League-best six assists as a senior in 2014. While in college, Lacroix also appeared for Premier Development League side Ocean City Nor'easters in 2012 and 2013.

=== Professional ===
Lacroix signed for North American Soccer League side Indy Eleven on 21 May 2015. He made his first appearance for the club in a 0–2 loss to Louisville City FC in the US Open Cup on 27 May 2015. His first goal for the club was the game-winning goal in a 3–0 victory over FC Edmonton on 13 June 2015. He would go on to play a total of 34 games and score three goals across two seasons with the Eleven, including the 2016 NASL Goal of the Year. The following season, Lacroix signed to the United Soccer League side Orange County Soccer Club on 15 March 2017. The following April, he signed for Reno 1868 FC in the United Soccer League. Lacroix played two seasons in Reno as a left back. He started 34 games in his second season, amassing 3,060 minutes played for the club. For the 2020 season, Lacroix signed to the United Soccer League side Charlotte Independence as a left back.

On 8 December 2020, Lacroix signed with Sacramento Republic FC.

Following the 2022 season, it was announced Lacroix would join USL Championship side Colorado Springs Switchbacks for the 2023 season.

== International career ==
Born in the United States, Lacroix is of Haitian descent. He was called up to the Haiti national football team for a set of 2023–24 CONCACAF Nations League matches in September 2023.

On 15 May 2026, he was included in Haiti head coach Sébastien Migné's 26-man squad for the 2026 FIFA World Cup.

== Career statistics ==
=== International ===
As of match played 4 October 2026

Appearances and goals by national team and year
National team	Year	Apps	Goals
Haiti	2023	1	0
Haiti	2024	5	2
Haiti	2025	7	0
Haiti	2026	5	1
Total		18	3

Scores and results list Haiti's goal tally first, score column indicates score after each Lacroix goal

List of international goals scored by Duke Lacroix
No.	Date	Venue	Opponent	Score	Result	Competition
1	9 June 2024	Wildey Turf, Wildey, Barbados	Barbados	2–0	3–1	2026 FIFA World Cup qualification
2	15 November 2024	Mayagüez Athletics Stadium, Mayagüez, Puerto Rico	Sint Maarten	3–0	8–0	2024–25 CONCACAF Nations League B
3	2 June 2026	Inter Miami CF Stadium, Fort Lauderdale, United States	New Zealand	4–0	4–0	Friendly
