= Tim Hankinson =

American soccer coach (1955–2022)

Personal information
- Full name: Timothy Milledge Hankinson
- Date of birth: February 18, 1955
- Place of birth: Manhattan, New York, U.S.
- Date of death: September 22, 2022 (aged 67)
- Place of death: United States

Youth career
- 1973–1976: Storm King School

College career
Years	Team	Apps	(Gls)
1976–1979	South Carolina Gamecocks		

Managerial career
- 1979: Oglethorpe University
- 1980–1981: Alabama A&M
- 1982–1983: DePaul University
- 1985–1990: Syracuse University
- 1991: UMF Tindastóll
- 1992–1994: Charleston Battery
- 1994–1995: Raleigh Flyers
- 1998–2000: Tampa Bay Mutiny
- 2001–2004: Colorado Rapids
- 2007–2008: Fort Lewis College
- 2009–2010: Salgaocar SC
- 2012–2013: San Antonio Scorpions
- 2015: Montego Bay United
- 2015–2017: Indy Eleven
- 2018: Montego Bay United
- 2018–2019: Chattanooga Red Wolves

Timothy Milledge Hankinson (February 18, 1955 – September 22, 2022) was an American soccer coach. He initially coached American college teams, before becoming head coach in Major League Soccer, as well as managing teams in Iceland, India, and Jamaica.

== Early career ==
Hankinson was born in New York City on February 18, 1955. His father, Richard "Dick" Hankinson, was a pianist; his mother, Nelle "Pokey" Hankinson (née Rahm), was "an actress in the early days of television". Hankinson's career as a player began at age 5 as a kindergarten student at St. David's School. The school had a relationship with a German soccer coach who taught the students how to play the game on the grassy spaces at nearby Central Park. Seeing the coach perform a simple trick with a ball intrigued the young player and a lifelong love of the game began. Following his 8th grade graduation from St. David's, Hankinson continued his education and soccer playing in Upstate New York at The Storm King School, then at the University of South Carolina (USC). While a college student, he earned his USSF C and B Licenses, already knowing his future would lead to a career in coaching.

== Coaching career ==
=== Collegiate soccer ===
After graduating from South Carolina in 1979, Hankinson's career as a head coach began at Oglethorpe University. After one season that ended with his team making an appearance as NAIA District Finalists, he moved on to the men's head coach post at Alabama A&M. In his two seasons at the helm, Hankinson's sides compiled an impressive 37–5–4 (W-L-D) record and made a pair of appearances in the NCAA Men's Soccer Championship finishing 3rd in 1980 and 2nd in 1981. Hankinson soon moved on to DePaul University for the 1982 and 1983 seasons where he helped transition the school's men's soccer program into the NCAA Division I ranks. He then took a year off before joining Syracuse University as their men's head coach in 1985. From 1985 to 1990, Hankinson's teams were 69–40–18 (W-L-D) including a Big East Conference championship in 1985. Their performance also yielded individual recognition for Hankinson as he was named Big East Conference Coach of the Year for 1986, becoming the first Syracuse head coach to win the award.

=== Professional soccer ===
After a fair amount of success in the collegiate game, Hankinson turned to coaching professional players and during the 1991 season was in the head coach role at UMF Tindastóll in Iceland's 2nd tier. He was the first U.S. national to coach in Iceland. He later returned home to the U.S. and in 1992 helped found the Charleston Battery club which competed in the USL (known then as the United States Interregional Soccer League (USISL)). While head coach and general manager, Hankinson's squads reached the league playoffs in 1993, then returned again in 1994 where they advanced to the semi-finals. Hankinson was consequently named USISL Coach of the Year in 1994.

Hankinson then spent the 1995 season as the general manager of the Raleigh Flyers before joining the nascent MLS as their first Director of Player Development. From 1996 to 1998 Hankinson led scouting and player development as the league worked to establish itself as both a viable enterprise and the top level of soccer in the United States. During this same period, Hankinson was the head coach for Project-40 where he worked with future MLS stars such as Ben Olson and soon-to-be U.S. national team regulars like Tim Howard.

In 1998, Hankinson transitioned to become head coach of the now-defunct Tampa Bay Mutiny. The franchise won 39 games from 1998 to 2000 and made playoff appearances in 1999 and 2000 before the doors were closed following the 2001 season as part of the MLS contraction that downsized the league from 12 teams to 10. But by then, Hankinson had already departed for Denver to take the top job at Colorado Rapids in late 2000. Hankinson's teams won 40 games during his time with the club and reached the playoffs three consecutive seasons between 2002 and 2004. This period also included a streak of 31 home games where the team lost just one game. In late 2004, the Rapids were sold by AEG to KSE and Hankinson was let go along with the bulk of the Rapids front office to make way for the new owner's leadership team.

Seeking a change and looking to take his coaching to the next level, Hankinson decamped for Brazil and a stint with Serie A (First Division) Figueirense FC where he worked as a guest coach, learning Brazilian training methods and deepening his knowledge of the game.

=== Return to amateur soccer ===
Choosing to stay in Latin America, in 2006 he joined the Guatemala Football Federation as the U-17 men's head coach where he led the side through International "friendlies" and a competitive, but ultimately unsuccessful, 2007 World Cup qualifying campaign. Hankinson once again looked to the U.S. for his next opportunity and returned to his collegiate roots, and Colorado, in taking the reins at Fort Lewis College. In just two seasons (2007 and 2008), his teams went 32–8–4 (W-L-D), won the Rocky Mountain Athletic Conference (RMAC) twice, advanced to the NCAA Division II Tournament twice and, at times, were nationally ranked #1. For his team's 2008 run, Hankinson was named 2008 RMAC Co-Coach of the Year.

=== India ===
In mid-2009, Hankinson went abroad for the third time to become the "chief coach" of Salgaocar SC in Vasco, Goa, India. However, his time with the club was cut short after just six months and he parted with the club early in 2010.

=== Youth soccer ===
After a brief period away from soccer, Hankinson went back to the U.S. and coached youth teams. In late 2010, he joined the staff of Broomfield Soccer Club as its Director of Coaching, citing the club's location in the familiar surroundings of Colorado, close proximity to family and the opportunity to "give back to the game" at the most fundamental level as key criteria in his decision to take the post.

=== Return to the pro game ===
Following a productive year with Broomfield SC, Hankinson was appointed the first head coach for San Antonio Scorpions of the North American Soccer League (NASL) on September 14, 2011. His first task was to lead the assembly of their new professional side and take them into league play for the 2012 season. During their inaugural season the Scorpions achieved a 13W-8D-7L to win the regular season title, but bowed out of the playoffs in the semi-finals. The 2013 season had a much bumpier ride and following a 8W-3D-11L start, Hankinson and the Scorpions parted ways August 27, 2013. After a two-year sabbatical, Hankinson joined Montego Bay United F.C. for a short, but successful stint, compiling a 7W-4D-2L record during the first half of their 2015–16 season from August through mid-November when Hankinson was lured back to the NASL and announced as the new head coach of Indy Eleven on December 2, 2015.

After leading the Eleven to the 2016 NASL Spring Season Championship with an unbeaten Spring season, and a berth in the 2016 NASL Championship Final, Hankinson was named the NASL Coach of the Year. Hankinson's contract was not renewed after the Fall 2017 season, which the Eleven finished in last position with a 3–4–9 record, and 7–12–13 over the entire year.

== Personal life ==
Hankinson was married to Yvette Miller White from Nov 23, 2013.

Hankinson had two sons, Bryan and Matthew. And three step-children, Ryan, Shelby and Jackie

Hankinson died on September 22, 2022. He was 67, and suffered from stage 4 adenocarcinoma prior to his death.
