= Nemanja Vuković =

Montenegrin footballer (born 1984)

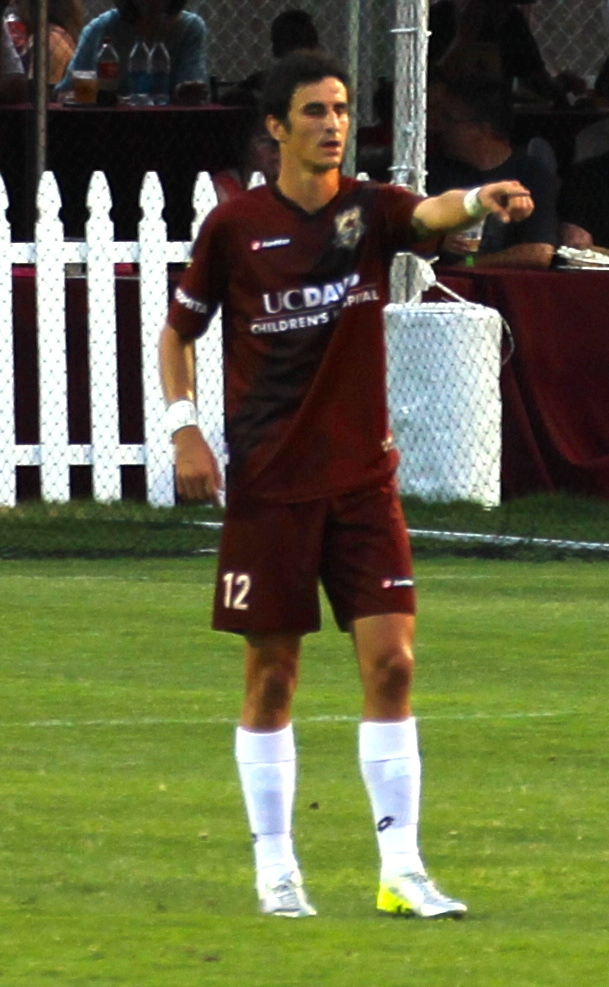
- Vuković in 2014

Personal information
- Full name: Nemanja Vuković
- Date of birth: 13 April 1984 (age 42)
- Place of birth: Titograd, SFR Yugoslavia
- Height: 1.89 m (6 ft 2 in)
- Position: Defender

Team information
- Current team: without club

Youth career
- 2001–2003: Drezga

Senior career*
Years	Team	Apps	(Gls)
2003–2005	Kom Podgorica	36	(4)
2005–2009	Budućnost Podgorica	36	(3)
2009–2011	Panetolikos	29	(3)
2011	Grbalj	12	(2)
2012	Columbus Crew	15	(0)
2013	Mladost Podgorica	14	(0)
2014	Hoverla Uzhhorod	0	(0)
2014–2015	Sacramento Republic FC	56	(4)
2016–2017	Indy Eleven	59	(5)
2018	Atlantic City FC	0	(0)
2018	Tulsa Roughnecks	26	(2)

Managerial career
- 2019–2022: FC Tulsa (assistant)
- * Club domestic league appearances and goals

Nemanja Vuković (Cyrillic: Немања Вуковић; born 13 April 1984) is a Montenegrin football coach and former player.

== Career ==
Vuković started his career in Montenegro with FK Kom in 2003. In 2005, he signed with Budućnost Podgorica in Montenegro. In 2009, he moved to Greek Beta Ethniki side Panetolikos. In summer 2011, he returned to Montenegro with OFK Grbalj.

In March 2012, Vuković signed with Columbus Crew of Major League Soccer. He was released at the end of the 2012 season.

Vuković returned to Montenegro in early 2013 with Mladost Podgorica. He was released in July 2013. In July 2013 he signed a two-year contract with Ukrainian side Hoverla Uzhhorod.

In 2014, Vuković signed with expansion club Sacramento Republic FC of the USL Pro. He started 33 games as the new club won the 2014 USL Pro championship.

Vuković transferred to North American Soccer League side Indy Eleven on 19 January 2016.

In April 2018, Vukovic joined Tulsa Roughnecks FC in the United Soccer League.
