= 2013 San Antonio Scorpions FC season =

San Antonio Scorpions
2013 season
- Owner: Gordon Hartman
- Manager: Tim Hankinson (until August 27, 2013); Alen Marcina (interim)
- Stadium: Toyota Field
- NASL: Spring: 3rd Fall: 8th Combined: 7th
- NASL Playoffs: Did not qualify
- U.S. Open Cup: Second Round
- Top goalscorer: League: Hans Denissen (12); All: Hans Denissen (13)
- Highest home attendance: League: 8,177 (April 13 vs. Tampa Bay); All: 8,255 (July 6 vs. Tigres)
- Lowest home attendance: League: 5,886 (Aug 31 vs. Minnesota United); All: 3,578 (May 21 vs. FC Tucson)
- Average home league attendance: League: 6,937; All: 6,708
Home colors	Away colors

The 2013 San Antonio Scorpions FC season was the club's second season of existence, where they played in the North American Soccer League, the second division of the American soccer pyramid. Including the San Antonio Thunder soccer franchise of the original NASL, this was the 4th season of professional soccer in San Antonio. The Scorpions were the reigning North American Supporters' Trophy winners and began play at Toyota Field in San Antonio, Texas.

== Competitions ==
=== NASL Spring Championship ===
The spring season consists of 12 games beginning on April 6 and ending on July 4. The schedule features a round robin format with each team playing every other team home and away. The winner of the spring season will automatically qualify for, and host, the 2013 Soccer Bowl.

==== Standings ====
Pos	Team	Pld	W	D	L	GF	GA	GD	Pts	Qualification
1	Atlanta Silverbacks (S)	12	6	3	3	20	15	+5	21	Soccer Bowl 2013
2	Carolina RailHawks	12	5	5	2	20	16	+4	20	
3	San Antonio Scorpions	12	6	2	4	19	15	+4	20	
4	Tampa Bay Rowdies	12	5	3	4	21	16	+5	18	
5	FC Edmonton	12	3	5	4	13	12	+1	14	
6	Minnesota United FC	12	4	2	6	18	23	−5	14	
7	Fort Lauderdale Strikers	12	2	2	8	10	24	−14	8	

Source: NASL Standings
Rules for classification: 1) points; 2) goal difference; 3) number of goals scored.
(S) Spring season champion

==== Results ====
Overall								Home						Away					
Pld	W	D	L	GF	GA	GD	Pts	W	D	L	GF	GA	GD	W	D	L	GF	GA	GD
12	6	2	4	19	15	+4	20	4	1	1	11	6	+5	2	1	3	8	9	−1

Last updated: July 4, 2013.
Source: http://www.nasl.com/standings/season/7837

===== Results by round =====
Round	1	2	3	4	5	6	7	8	9	10	11	12
Stadium	A	H	A	H	A	H	A	H	A	H	A	H
Result	D	L	L	D	L	W	L	W	W	W	W	W

Updated to match(es) played on July 4, 2013. Source: nasl.com
A = Away; H = Home; W = Win; D = Draw; L = Loss

==== Matches ====
Kickoff times are in CDT (UTC-05) unless shown otherwise

Win Loss Draw

April 6, 2013 Matchday 1	Minnesota United	0–0	San Antonio Scorpions	Minneapolis, Minnesota
19:00 CDT		Report	Jordan (yellow card) 81'	Stadium: Hubert H. Humphrey Metrodome; Attendance: 6,754; Referee: Younes Marrakchi

April 13, 2013 Matchday 2	San Antonio Scorpions	0–2	Tampa Bay Rowdies	San Antonio, Texas
19:40 CDT (UTC-05)	Hannigan (yellow card) 55'; Phelan (yellow card) 83'	Report	Walker 12'; Hristov 56' (pen.); Needham (yellow card) 61'	Stadium: Toyota Field; Attendance: 8,177; Referee: Matthew Foerster

April 28, 2013 Matchday 3	FC Edmonton	1–0	San Antonio Scorpions	Edmonton, Alberta
15:00 CDT (UTC-05)				Stadium: Clarke Stadium; Attendance: 921

May 4, 2013 Matchday 4	San Antonio Scorpions	2–2	Atlanta Silverbacks	San Antonio, Texas
19:30 CDT (UTC-05)	Denissen 20'; Husić 28'	Report	Menjivar 5'; Mendes 30'	Stadium: Toyota Field; Attendance: 7,053

May 11, 2013 Matchday 5	Carolina RailHawks	5–2	San Antonio Scorpions	Cary, North Carolina
18:00 CDT (UTC-05)				Stadium: WakeMed Soccer Park; Attendance: 6,708

May 18, 2013 Matchday 6	San Antonio Scorpions	3–1	Fort Lauderdale Strikers	San Antonio, Texas
19:30 CDT (UTC-05)	Saavedra 1'; Phelan (yellow card) 38'; Vučko 54'; Gordon 58' (o.g.); Vuolo (yellow card) 66'; Husić (yellow card) 80'		Gordon 55'; Thomas (yellow card) 47'; Guerrero (yellow card) 74'; Gonzalez (yellow card) 81'	Stadium: Toyota Field; Attendance: 6,889

May 25, 2013 Matchday 7	Atlanta Silverbacks	1–0	San Antonio Scorpions	Atlanta, Georgia
18:30 CDT (UTC-05)	Barrera 86'	Report		Stadium: Atlanta Silverbacks Park; Attendance: 4,421

June 1, 2013 Matchday 8	San Antonio Scorpions	2–0	Minnesota United FC	San Antonio, Texas
19:30 CDT (UTC-05)	Wagner 1'; Ramírez 45'; Denissen (yellow card) 63'; Jordan (yellow card) 78'	Report	Dias (yellow card) 61'	Stadium: Toyota Field; Attendance: 6,763; Referee: Jose Carlos Rivero

June 15, 2013 Matchday 9	Tampa Bay Rowdies	1–2	San Antonio Scorpions	St. Petersburg, Florida
18:30 CDT (UTC-05)	Mulholland (yellow card) 72'; Cort 80'	Report	Vučko (yellow card) 8'; Wagner 37'; Zavaleta (yellow card) 51'; Harmse (yellow card) 63'; Phelan (yellow card) 79'; Janicki (yellow card) 82'; Denissen 88'	Stadium: Al Lang Stadium; Attendance: 4,595; Referee: Alejandro Mariscal

June 22, 2013 Matchday 10	San Antonio Scorpions	2–1	FC Edmonton	San Antonio, Texas
19:30 CDT (UTC-05)				Stadium: Toyota Field; Attendance: 6,489

June 29, 2013 Matchday 11	Fort Lauderdale Strikers	1–4	San Antonio Scorpions	Fort Lauderdale, Florida
18:30 CDT (UTC-05)				Stadium: Lockhart Stadium; Attendance: 3,285

July 4, 2013 Matchday 12	San Antonio Scorpions	2–0	Carolina RailHawks	San Antonio, Texas
19:30 CDT (UTC-05)				Stadium: Toyota Field; Attendance: 7,467

=== Mid-season friendlies ===
July 6, 2013 International friendly	San Antonio Scorpions (United States)	1–5	(Mexico) Tigres UANL	San Antonio, Texas
				Stadium: Toyota Field; Attendance: 8,255

July 14, 2013 Charity match	San Antonio Scorpions	4–3	Oklahoma City FC	San Antonio, Texas
				Stadium: Toyota Field; Attendance: 4,024

July 20, 2013 International friendly	San Antonio Scorpions (United States)	1–2	(Mexico) Dorados de Sinaloa	San Antonio, Texas
				Stadium: Toyota Field; Attendance: 5,311

=== NASL Fall Championship ===
The fall season consists of 14 games beginning on August 3 and ending on November 2. The schedule features a round robin format with each team playing every other team home and away. The fall season also introduces the New York Cosmos into the league. The winner of the fall season will automatically qualify for the 2013 Soccer Bowl.

==== Standings ====
Pos	Team	Pld	W	D	L	GF	GA	GD	Pts	Qualification
1	New York Cosmos (F)	14	9	4	1	22	12	+10	31	Soccer Bowl 2013
2	Carolina RailHawks	14	7	2	5	21	16	+5	23	
3	Tampa Bay Rowdies	14	5	5	4	30	27	+3	20	
4	Minnesota United FC	14	6	2	6	21	19	+2	20	
5	Fort Lauderdale Strikers	14	5	3	6	18	20	−2	18	
6	FC Edmonton	14	3	7	4	13	14	−1	16	
7	Atlanta Silverbacks	14	4	4	6	14	22	−8	16	
8	San Antonio Scorpions	14	3	1	10	15	24	−9	10	

Source: NASL Standings
Rules for classification: 1) points; 2) goal difference; 3) number of goals scored.
(F) Fall season champion

==== Results ====
Overall								Home						Away					
Pld	W	D	L	GF	GA	GD	Pts	W	D	L	GF	GA	GD	W	D	L	GF	GA	GD
14	3	1	10	15	24	−9	10	3	0	4	12	15	−3	0	1	6	3	9	−6

Last updated: November 2, 2013.
Source: http://www.nasl.com/standings/season/7837

===== Results by round =====
Round	1	2	3	4	5	6	7	8	9	10	11	12	13	14
Stadium	H	A	H	A	H	A	A	H	A	H	H	A	H	A
Result	L	L	L	L	L	D	L	W	L	W	W	L	L	L

Updated to match(es) played on November 2, 2013. Source: nasl.com
A = Away; H = Home; W = Win; D = Draw; L = Loss

==== Matches ====
Kickoff times are in CDT (UTC-05) unless shown otherwise

Win Loss Draw

August 3, 2013 Matchday 13	San Antonio Scorpions	4–7	Tampa Bay Rowdies	San Antonio, Texas
19:37 CDT	Denissen 3', 16'; Zahorski 18', 79'; Janicki (yellow card) 88'	Report	Mulholland 25'; Savage 32'; Frimpong 42'; Walker 45+3'; Hristov 67', 90+2' (pen.); Barbara (yellow card) 66' (goal) 85'	Stadium: Toyota Field; Attendance: 7,651; Referee: Jair Marrufo

August 11, 2013 Matchday 14	FC Edmonton	1–0	San Antonio Scorpions	Edmonton, Alberta
15:00 CDT (UTC-05)				Stadium: Clarke Stadium; Attendance: 1,745

August 17, 2013 Matchday 15	San Antonio Scorpions	1–2	Fort Lauderdale Strikers	San Antonio, Texas
19:30 CDT (UTC-05)				Stadium: Toyota Field; Attendance: 6,105

August 24, 2013 Matchday 16	New York Cosmos	2–1	San Antonio Scorpions	Hempstead, New York
18:00 CDT (UTC-05)	Díaz (yellow card) 7' (goal) 42'; López 90+2'	Report	Janicki (yellow card) 8' (yellow-red card) 52'; Harmse (yellow card) 37'; Phelan (yellow card) 45+1'; Ramírez (yellow card) 45+3'; Zahorski 64'	Stadium: James M. Shuart Stadium; Attendance: 6,852; Referee: José Rivero

August 31, 2013 Matchday 17	San Antonio Scorpions	2–3	Minnesota United FC	San Antonio, Texas
19:30 CDT (UTC-05)	Ramírez 14'; Jennings (red card) 58'; Zahorski 78'	Report	Campos (yellow card) 15', (goal) 34', 50'; Mallace (yellow card) 85'; Tobin 90'	Stadium: Toyota Field; Attendance: 5,886; Referee: Mark Kadlecik

September 7, 2013 Matchday 18	Fort Lauderdale Strikers	0–0	San Antonio Scorpions	Fort Lauderdale, Florida
18:30 CDT (UTC-05)				Stadium: Lockhart Stadium; Attendance: 3,467

September 14, 2013 Matchday 19	Atlanta Silverbacks	2–1	San Antonio Scorpions	Atlanta, Georgia
18:30 CDT (UTC-05)	Luna 13'; Barerra 51'	Report	Denissen 66'	Stadium: Atlanta Silverbacks Park; Attendance: 3,754

September 21, 2013 Matchday 20	San Antonio Scorpions	2–1	Carolina RailHawks	San Antonio, Texas
19:30 CDT (UTC-05)				Stadium: Toyota Field; Attendance: 6,488

September 28, 2013 Matchday 21	Minnesota United FC	1–0	San Antonio Scorpions	Blaine, Minnesota
14:30 CDT (UTC-05)	Bracalello (yellow card) 43'; Campos 61'	Report	Wagner (yellow card) 67'; Husić (yellow card) 72'	Stadium: National Sports Center; Attendance: 2,028; Referee: David Gantar

October 5, 2013 Matchday 22	San Antonio Scorpions	1–0	Atlanta Silverbacks	San Antonio, Texas
19:30 CDT (UTC-05)	Zahorski 64'	Report		Stadium: Toyota Field; Attendance: 6,570
Note: 50th regular season NASL match

October 13, 2013 Matchday 23	San Antonio Scorpions	1–0	FC Edmonton	San Antonio, Texas
19:30 CDT (UTC-05)				Stadium: Toyota Field; Attendance: 6,938

October 19, 2014 Matchday 24	Tampa Bay Rowdies	1–0	San Antonio Scorpions	St. Petersburg, Florida
18:30 CDT (UTC-05)	Mulholland 76' (pen.)	Report	Ramírez (yellow card) 85'	Stadium: Al Lang Stadium; Attendance: 3,237

October 26, 2014 Matchday 25	San Antonio Scorpions	1–2	New York Cosmos	San Antonio, Texas
19:30 CDT (UTC-05)	Zahorski 3' (yellow card) 65'; Wagner (yellow card) 34'; Rubiato (yellow card) 64'		Senna 52'; Díaz (yellow card) 52'; Dimitrov 54' (yellow card) 54'; Murphy (red card) 74'; Freeman (yellow card) 74'; Szetela (yellow card) 76'	Stadium: Toyota Field; Attendance: 7,702; Referee: Juan Guzmán

November 2, 2013 Matchday 26	Carolina RailHawks	2–1	San Antonio Scorpions	Cary, North Carolina
18:00 CDT (UTC-05)				Stadium: WakeMed Soccer Park; Attendance: 6,015

=== U.S. Open Cup ===
May 21, 2013 Second round	San Antonio Scorpions (Texas)	2–2 (a.e.t.) (3–4 p)	(Arizona) FC Tucson	San Antonio, Texas
7:30 PM CDT	Harmse 30'; Denissen 90+' (pen.)		Velasco 57'; Robinson 67'	Stadium: Toyota Field; Attendance: 3,578
	Penalties
	Wagner (penalty scored); Phelan (penalty missed); Ramirez (penalty scored); Denissen (penalty scored); Harmse (penalty missed)		Carter (penalty scored); Brandt (penalty scored); Zimmerman (penalty scored); Collins (penalty scored)
