= 2014 San Antonio Scorpions season =

San Antonio Scorpions
2014 season
- Owner: (United States) Gordon Hartman
- Manager: (Canada) Alen Marcina
- Stadium: Toyota Field
- NASL: Spring: 3rd Fall: 1st Combined: 2nd
- NASL Playoffs: Champions
- U.S. Open Cup: Fourth Round
- Top goalscorer: League: Rafael Castillo (7); All: Rafael Castillo (9)
- Highest home attendance: 8,313 (Sep 20 vs. Minnesota United)
- Lowest home attendance: League: 5,594 (Sep 6 vs. FC Edmonton); All: 3,411 (May 28 vs. NTX Rayados)
- Average home league attendance: League: 6,810; All: 6,588
Home colors	Away colors	Third colors

The 2014 season was San Antonio Scorpions FC's third season of existence, and its third consecutive season in the North American Soccer League, the second division of the American soccer pyramid. Including the San Antonio Thunder soccer franchise of the original NASL, this was the 5th season of professional soccer in San Antonio.

== Competitions ==
=== Pre-season ===
February 22, 2014	San Antonio Scorpions	3 – 3	SMU Mustangs	San Antonio, Texas
1:00 PM CST	Saiko 22'; Barrera 28'; Touray	Report	Andrew Morales, Stanton Garcia 82'	Stadium: Toyota Field

March 15, 2014	San Antonio Scorpions	4 – 0	Tulsa Athletics	San Antonio, Texas
4:00 PM CST	Garza 24'; Bayona 56', 71', 78'	Report		Stadium: Toyota Field

March 20, 2014	Houston Dynamo	0 – 2	San Antonio Scorpions	Houston, Texas
12:30 PM CST		Report	Zohorski 55'; Restrepo 85'	Stadium: Houston Sports Park

March 29, 2014 Scrimmage	San Antonio Scorpions	1 – 0	Trinity Tigers	San Antonio, Texas
4:00 PM CST	Touray 59'			Stadium: Toyota Field

==== deeproot Funds Cup ====
March 1, 2014 1st Annual	San Antonio Scorpions	1 – 1	FC Dallas	San Antonio, Texas
7:00 PM CST	Janicki 90+'	Report	Jacobson (yellow card) 15'; Acosta 47'	Stadium: Toyota Field; Attendance: 7,967

==== International Friendlies ====
April 5, 2014	San Antonio Scorpions (United States)	1 – 1	(Costa Rica) Deportivo Saprissa	San Antonio, Texas
7:30 PM CST	deRoux (yellow card) 53'; Janicki (yellow card) 60' (goal) 79'	Report	Segura 30' (pen.)	Stadium: Toyota Field

=== NASL Spring Season ===
The spring season will last for 9 games beginning on April 12 and ending on June 8. The schedule will feature a single round robin format with each team playing every other team in the league a single time. Half the teams will host 5 home games and play 4 road games whereas the other half of the teams will play 4 home games and 5 road games. The winner of the spring Season will automatically qualify for the 2014 NASL Playoffs (The Championship).

==== Standings ====
Pos	Team	Pld	W	D	L	GF	GA	GD	Pts	Qualification
1	Minnesota United (S)	9	6	2	1	16	9	+7	20	Playoffs
2	New York Cosmos	9	6	1	2	14	3	+11	19	
3	San Antonio Scorpions	9	5	2	2	13	9	+4	17	
4	Carolina RailHawks	9	4	2	3	11	15	−4	14	
5	Fort Lauderdale Strikers	9	4	1	4	18	18	0	13	
6	Ottawa Fury	9	3	1	5	14	13	+1	10	
7	Tampa Bay Rowdies	9	2	4	3	11	16	−5	10	
8	Atlanta Silverbacks	9	3	1	5	12	20	−8	10	
9	FC Edmonton	9	2	2	5	11	11	0	8	
10	Indy Eleven	9	0	4	5	14	20	−6	4	

Source: NASL Standings
(S) Spring season champion

==== Results ====
Overall								Home						Away					
Pld	W	D	L	GF	GA	GD	Pts	W	D	L	GF	GA	GD	W	D	L	GF	GA	GD
9	5	2	2	13	9	+4	17	1	2	2	5	5	0	4	0	0	8	4	+4

Last updated: June 7, 2014.
Source: http://www.nasl.com/standings/season/8945

===== Results by round =====
Round	1	2	3	4	5	6	7	8	9
Ground	H	A	A	H	H	H	A	A	H
Result	L	W	W	L	W	D	W	W	D
Position	9	5	4	5	4	4	3	3	3

Updated to match(es) played on June 7, 2014. Source: nasl.com
A = Away; H = Home; W = Win; D = Draw; L = Loss

==== Matches ====
Kickoff times are in CDT (UTC−05) unless shown otherwise

Win Loss Draw

April 12, 2014 Spring #1	San Antonio Scorpions	0 – 2	Minnesota United FC	San Antonio, Texas
7:30 PM CDT	Cann (yellow card) 13'; James (red card) 25'; Barrera (yellow card) 32'; Touray (yellow card) 63'; Menjivar (yellow card) 74'	Report	Ramirez 17'; Calvano (yellow card) 25'; Dias (yellow card) 26'; Venegas 73'; Watson (yellow card) 90'	Stadium: Toyota Field; Attendance: 7,381; Referee: Matthew Foerster

April 19, 2014 Spring #2	Atlanta Silverbacks	1 – 2	San Antonio Scorpions	Atlanta
6:30 PM CDT (UTC−05)	McCaulay (yellow card) 26'; Rivera (yellow card) 40'; Sandoval 82'	Report	Hassli (yellow card) 19'; Janicki 34'; Saiko 46'; Barrera (yellow card) 82'	Stadium: Atlanta Silverbacks Park; Attendance: 5,000; Referee: Fotis Bazakos

April 26, 2014 Spring #3	New York Cosmos	0 – 1	San Antonio Scorpions	Hempstead, New York
6:00 PM CDT (UTC−05)	Noselli (yellow card) 81'; Szetela (yellow card) 86'	Report	Hassli 13'; James (yellow card) 80'	Stadium: James M. Shuart Stadium; Attendance: 4,130; Referee: Mark Geiger

May 3, 2014 Spring #4	San Antonio Scorpions	0 – 1	Tampa Bay Rowdies	San Antonio, Texas
7:30 PM CDT (UTC−05)	Cann (yellow card) 35'; Touray (yellow card) 88'	Report	Hill 51'; Savage (yellow card) 57'; Wagner (red card) 77'; Pickens (yellow card) 84'	Stadium: Toyota Field; Attendance: 5,595; Referee: Ted Unkel

May 10, 2014 Spring #5	San Antonio Scorpions	3 – 0	Carolina RailHawks	San Antonio, Texas
7:30 PM CDT (UTC−05)	DeRoux (yellow card) 19'; Janicki (yellow card) 33'; Hassli 53'; Barrera 59' (yellow card) 87'; Zahorski 77' (pen.)	Report	Scott (yellow card) 40'	Stadium: Toyota Field; Attendance: 5,834; Referee: Daniel Fitzgerald

May 17, 2014 Spring #6	San Antonio Scorpions	0 – 0	FC Edmonton	San Antonio, Texas
7:30 PM CDT (UTC−05)	Menjivar (yellow card) 33'; Borrajo (yellow card) 45'; Hassli (yellow card) 90'; Restrepo (yellow card) 90'	Report	Laing (yellow card) 13'; Roberts (red card) 27'; Edward (yellow card) 48'; Jones (yellow card) 90'	Stadium: Toyota Field; Attendance: 7,087; Referee: (United States) Juan Guzman

May 24, 2014 Spring #7	Ottawa Fury FC	2 – 3	San Antonio Scorpions	Ottawa, Ontario
6:00 PM CDT (UTC−05)	Trafford (yellow card) 24'; Donatelli 71'; Ubiparipović 80'; Beckie (yellow card) 85'	Report	Cann (yellow card) 52'; Janicki 57'; James (yellow card) 70'; Menjivar (yellow card) 80'; Hassli 83'; Zahorski 90'	Stadium: Keith Harris Stadium; Attendance: 2,432; Referee: (Canada) Chris Grabas

May 31, 2014 Spring #8	Indy Eleven	1 – 2	San Antonio Scorpions	Indianapolis
6:30 PM CDT (UTC−05)	Corrado (yellow card) 7'; Ring (yellow card) 43'; Smith 74'; Norales (yellow card) 80'	Report	Forbes (yellow card) 23' (goal) 52'; Menjivar (yellow card) 63'; Restrepo 90'	Stadium: Michael Carroll Stadium; Attendance: 10,285; Referee: Chris Penso

June 7, 2014 Spring #9	San Antonio Scorpions	2 – 2	Fort Lauderdale Strikers	San Antonio, Texas
7:30 PM CDT (UTC−05)	Touray 24'; Hassli (red card) 36'; Soto 57'	Report	Chin 10'; Antonijevic (yellow card) 26'; Picault 90' (red card) 90'	Stadium: Toyota Field; Attendance: 6,484; Referee: Armando Villarreal

==== Awards ====
NASL Player of the Week Awards – Spring 2014
Week	Player	Nation
Week 8	Walter Restrepo	USA

=== Mid-season friendlies ===
June 21, 2014 International friendly	San Antonio Scorpions (United States)	1 – 2	(Mexico) Tigres UANL	San Antonio, Texas
7:30 PM CST	Barrera (yellow card) 39'; Forbes 65'		Villa 8'; Lugo 58'	Stadium: Toyota Field; Attendance: 6,483

June 28, 2014 International friendly	San Antonio Scorpions (United States)	3 – 3	Mexico U-21	San Antonio, Texas
7:30 PM CST	Forbes 8'; Hassli (yellow card) 54' (goal) 66' 90' (pen.)		Casilla 40'; James 46' (o.g.); Hernández (yellow card) 57'; Espiricueta 73' (pen.)	Stadium: Toyota Field; Attendance: 5,129

July 6, 2014 International friendly	San Antonio Scorpions (United States)	1 – 1	(Mexico) C.F. Monterrey	San Antonio, Texas
6:00 PM CST	Zahorski 40'; Cruz (yellow card) 45'	Report	Madrigal 24'; Hernández (yellow card) 55'; Velarde (yellow card) 78'	Stadium: Toyota Field; Attendance: 6,397

=== NASL Fall Season ===
The fall season will last for 18 games beginning on July 12 and ending on November 1. The schedule will feature a double round robin format with each team playing every other team in the league twice, one at home and one on the road. The winner of the fall season will automatically qualify for the 2014 NASL Playoffs (The Championship).

==== Standings ====
Pos	Team	Pld	W	D	L	GF	GA	GD	Pts	Qualification
1	San Antonio Scorpions (F)	18	11	2	5	30	15	+15	35	Playoffs
2	Minnesota United	18	10	5	3	31	19	+12	35	
3	FC Edmonton	18	8	5	5	23	18	+5	29	
4	Fort Lauderdale Strikers	18	7	6	5	20	21	−1	27	
5	Carolina RailHawks	18	7	3	8	27	28	−1	24	
6	New York Cosmos	18	5	8	5	23	24	−1	23	
7	Indy Eleven	18	6	5	7	21	26	−5	23	
8	Tampa Bay Rowdies	18	5	5	8	25	34	−9	20	
9	Ottawa Fury	18	4	5	9	20	25	−5	17	
10	Atlanta Silverbacks	18	3	4	11	20	30	−10	13	

Source: NASL Standings
(F) Fall season champion

==== Results ====
Overall								Home						Away					
Pld	W	D	L	GF	GA	GD	Pts	W	D	L	GF	GA	GD	W	D	L	GF	GA	GD
18	11	2	5	30	15	+15	35	7	1	1	20	4	+16	4	1	4	10	11	−1

Last updated: November 2, 2014.

===== Results by round =====
Round	1	2	3	4	5	6	7	8	9	10	11	12	13	14	15	16	17	18
Ground	A	H	H	A	A	H	A	H	A	H	A	H	A	H	H	A	A	H
Result	W	W	W	W	L	W	D	W	L	W	L	L	W	D	W	L	W	W
Position	1	1	1	1	1	1	2	1	1	1	1	2	2	2	2	2	2	1

Updated to match(es) played on November 2, 2014. Source: Fall season 2014 results
A = Away; H = Home; W = Win; D = Draw; L = Loss

==== Matches ====
Kickoff times are in CDT (UTC−05) unless shown otherwise

Win Loss Draw

July 12, 2014 Fall #1	New York Cosmos	1 – 3	San Antonio Scorpions	Hempstead, New York
6:00 PM CDT (UTC−05)	Nane (yellow card) 36'; Gorskie (yellow card) 45'; Freeman 57' (yellow card) 66'	Report	Castillo 41' (pen.) 45'; Touray 69'	Stadium: James M. Shuart Stadium; Attendance: 3,806; Referee: Jorge Lopez

July 19, 2014 Fall #2	San Antonio Scorpions	2 – 0	Fort Lauderdale Strikers	San Antonio, Texas
7:30 PM CDT (UTC−05)	Zahorski (yellow card) 16' (goal) 43'; Forbes 23'; DeRoux (yellow card) 26'; Bingham (yellow card) 81'; James (red card) 90'	Report	Jenison (yellow card) 24'; Alves (yellow card) 50'	Stadium: Toyota Field; Attendance: 6,958; Referee: Luis Guardia

July 23, 2014 Fall #3	San Antonio Scorpions	2 – 0	Carolina RailHawks	San Antonio, Texas
7:30 PM CDT (UTC−05)	Castillo (yellow card) 23' (goal) 62'; Forbes 64'	Report	Bentick (yellow card) 35'; Albadawi (yellow card) 42'; Elizondo (yellow card) 89'	Stadium: Toyota Field; Attendance: 7,884; Referee: Marcos de Oliveira

July 26, 2014 Fall #4	Tampa Bay Rowdies	0 – 2	San Antonio Scorpions	St. Petersburg, Florida
6:30 PM CDT (UTC−05)	Townsend (yellow card) 16'; Rodrigues (yellow card) 18'; Hristov (yellow card) 69'; Mkandawire (yellow card) 90'	Report	Mkosana 30' (o.g.); Caesar (yellow card) 52'; Zahorski (yellow card) 63'; Janicki (yellow card) 81'; Touray 90'	Stadium: Al Lang Stadium; Attendance: 4,868; Referee: Fotis Bazakos

August 3, 2014 Fall #5	FC Edmonton	3 – 1	San Antonio Scorpions	Edmonton, Alberta
3:00 PM CDT (UTC−05)	James 9'; Blanco (yellow card) 45'; Ameobi 69'; Jonke (yellow card) 70'; Fordyce 79'; Edward (yellow card) 87'	Report	Hassli 23' (pen.) (yellow card) 45'; Barrera (yellow card) 79'; Restrepo (yellow card) 81'	Stadium: Clarke Stadium; Attendance: 2,849; Referee: (Canada) David Barrie

August 9, 2014 Fall #6	San Antonio Scorpions	2 – 0	Indy Eleven	San Antonio, Texas
7:30 PM CDT (UTC−05)	Zahorski 28'; James 38' (red card) 57'	Report	Pineda (yellow card) 33'; Mares (yellow card) 82'; Estridge (yellow card) 90'	Stadium: Toyota Field; Attendance: 7,847; Referee: Armando Villarreal

August 17, 2014 Fall #7	Ottawa Fury FC	1 – 1	San Antonio Scorpions	Ottawa, Ontario
2:00 PM CDT (UTC−05)	Ryan (yellow card) 45'; Heinemann (yellow card) 47' (goal) 89'; Trafford (yellow card) 90'	Report	Restrepo (yellow card) 45'; DeRoux (yellow card) 47'; Caesar 76'; Janicki (yellow card) 80'	Stadium: TD Place Stadium; Attendance: 4,277; Referee: (Canada) Robert Schaap

August 23, 2014 Fall #8	San Antonio Scorpions	2 – 1	Atlanta Silverbacks	San Antonio, Texas
7:30 PM CDT (UTC−05)	Elizondo 49'; Menjivar (yellow card) 57'; Restrepo 77' (pen.)	Report	Sandoval 80' (yellow card) 80'	Stadium: Toyota Field; Attendance: 5,734; Referee: Marcos de Oliveira

August 29, 2014 Fall #9	Fort Lauderdale Strikers	2 – 0	San Antonio Scorpions	Fort Lauderdale, Florida
6:30 PM CDT (UTC−05)	Picault (yellow card) 11' (goal) 43'; Alves (yellow card) 23'; Hassan (red card) 64'; Pecka (yellow card) 68'; Anderson 79' (yellow card) 90'	Report	Forbes (yellow card) 14'; Restrepo (yellow card) 45'; Janicki (yellow card) 74'; Borrajo (yellow card) 86'; Elizondo (yellow card) 90'	Stadium: Lockhart Stadium; Attendance: 3,006; Referee: Fotis Bazakos

September 6, 2014 Fall #10	San Antonio Scorpions	3 – 0	FC Edmonton	San Antonio, Texas
7:30 PM CDT (UTC−05)	DeRoux (yellow card) 23'; Castillo 37'; James (yellow card) 64'; Zahorski (yellow card) 80'; Forbes 82'; Caesar 90'	Report	Edward (red card) 65'; Raudales (red card) 70'; Navarro (yellow card) 90'	Stadium: Toyota Field; Attendance: 5,594; Referee: Sorin Stoica

September 13, 2014 Fall #11	Carolina RailHawks	3 – 1	San Antonio Scorpions	Cary, North Carolina
6:30 PM CDT (UTC−05)	Albadawi 24'; Low (yellow card) 45'; Osaki 61'; Bentick (yellow card) 70'; Martínez 87'	Report	DeRoux (yellow card) 38'; Zahorski 73'	Stadium: WakeMed Soccer Park; Attendance: 3,193; Referee: Alex Chilowicz

September 20, 2014 Fall #12	San Antonio Scorpions	0 – 2	Minnesota United FC	San Antonio, Texas
7:30 PM CDT (UTC−05)	Elizondo (yellow card) 50'; DeRoux (yellow card) 90'	Report	Venegas (yellow card) 21'; Ibarra 22' 72'; Mendes (yellow card) 88'	Stadium: Toyota Field; Attendance: 8,313; Referee: Younes Marrakchi
Note: 75th regular season NASL match

September 27, 2014 Fall #13	Atlanta Silverbacks	0 – 1	San Antonio Scorpions	Atlanta
6:30 PM CDT (UTC−05)		Report	Castillo (yellow card) 33'; Elizondo 49'; Restrepo (yellow card) 79'	Stadium: Atlanta Silverbacks Park; Attendance: 3,062; Referee: Robert Sibiga

October 4, 2014 Fall #14	San Antonio Scorpions	1 – 1	Ottawa Fury FC	San Antonio, Texas
7:30 PM CDT (UTC−05)	Castillo 11'; James (yellow card) 16'; Gentile (yellow card) 82'	Report	Ubiparipović (yellow card) 19'; Jarun (yellow card) 21'; Paterson (yellow card) 31'; Richter 90'; Oliver (yellow card) 90'	Stadium: Toyota Field; Attendance: 5,963; Referee: Ismail Elfath

October 11, 2014 Fall #15	San Antonio Scorpions	7 – 0	Tampa Bay Rowdies	San Antonio, Texas
7:30 PM CDT (UTC−05)	Restrepo 27'; Castillo 42' 48' (pen.); Elizondo 53' 73'; Hassli 67' 77'	Report	Hill (yellow card) 41'; Mkandawire (red card) 46'; Frimpong (yellow card) 69'	Stadium: Toyota Field; Attendance: 5,683; Referee: Marcos de Oliveira

October 18, 2014 Fall #16	Indy Eleven	1 – 0	San Antonio Scorpions	Indianapolis
6:30 PM CDT (UTC−05)	Rugg 56'; Moore (yellow card) 90'	Report	Janicki (yellow card) 72'; Hassli (yellow card) 79'	Stadium: Michael Carroll Stadium; Attendance: 10,982; Referee: Alex Chilowicz

October 25, 2014 Fall #17	Minnesota United FC	0 – 1	San Antonio Scorpions	Blaine, Minnesota
6:00 PM CDT (UTC−05)	Tiago (yellow card) 24'; Van Oekel (yellow card) 62'	Report	James (yellow card) 58'; Elizondo 61'; Castillo (yellow card) 88'	Stadium: National Sports Center; Attendance: 6,454; Referee: Juan Guzman

November 1, 2014 Fall #18	San Antonio Scorpions	1 – 0	New York Cosmos	San Antonio, Texas
7:30 PM CDT (UTC−05)	Menjivar (yellow card) 76'; Elizondo (yellow card) 80'; Gentile (yellow card) 85'; Forbes (yellow card) 90'; Cann 90'	Report	Diosa (yellow card) 86'; Denissen (yellow card) 90'	Stadium: Toyota Field; Attendance: 8,205; Referee: Ismail Elfath

==== Awards ====
NASL Player of the Week Awards – Fall 2014
Week	Player	Nation
Week 2	Billy Forbes	TCA
Week 9	Rafael Castillo	COL
Week 17	Adrian Cann	CAN

=== NASL Playoffs ===
Soccer Bowl 2014 will be contested by the winners of the spring and fall seasons hosting the next best two teams in the full year regular season table. The half-season champions will earn the #1 & #2 seeds, with the higher seed going to the team with the better full-season record. The two next-best teams will earn the #3 & #4 seeds. In the event that the same team wins both half-season championships, they will be the #1 seed, with seeds 2-4 going to the three next-best full-season teams. The #1 seed will host the #4 seed and the #2 seed will host the #3 seed in the semi-finals. The winners will meet in the Championship game (Soccer Bowl 2014), hosted by the team with the higher seed.

Pos	Team	Pld	W	D	L	GF	GA	GD	Pts	Qualification
1	Minnesota United (X)	27	16	7	4	47	28	+19	55	Championship qualifiers
2	San Antonio Scorpions (C)	27	16	4	7	43	24	+19	52	Championship qualifiers
3	New York Cosmos	27	11	9	7	37	27	+10	42	Championship qualifiers
4	Fort Lauderdale Strikers	27	11	7	9	38	39	−1	40	Championship qualifiers
5	Carolina RailHawks	27	11	5	11	38	43	−5	38	
6	FC Edmonton	27	10	7	10	34	29	+5	37	
7	Tampa Bay Rowdies	27	7	9	11	36	50	−14	30	
8	Ottawa Fury	27	7	6	14	34	38	−4	27	
9	Indy Eleven	27	6	9	12	35	46	−11	27	
10	Atlanta Silverbacks	27	6	5	16	32	50	−18	23	

(C) Champions; (X) North American Supporters' Trophy winner

November 8, 2014 The Championship Semi-Final	San Antonio Scorpions	2 – 1 (a.e.t.)	New York Cosmos	San Antonio, Texas
7:30 PM CST (UTC−06)	Castillo 19' (yellow card) 55'; DeRoux (yellow card) 83'; Restrepo 110'	Report	Stokkelien 17'; Szetela (yellow card) 114'	Stadium: Toyota Field; Attendance: 6,548; Referee: Ricardo Salazar

November 15, 2014 Soccer Bowl 2014	San Antonio Scorpions	2 – 1 San Antonio Scorpions FC; 2014 Soccer Bowl Champions	Fort Lauderdale Strikers	San Antonio, Texas
7:30 PM CST (UTC−06)	Castillo 69'; Forbes 75'; Gentile (yellow card) 84'; Hassli (yellow card) 88'	Report	Ramírez 79'	Stadium: Toyota Field; Attendance: 7,847; Referee: Ted Unkel; Man of the Match: (Colombia) Rafael Castillo

=== Lamar Hunt U.S. Open Cup ===
May 28, 2014 Third Round	San Antonio Scorpions (Texas)	4 – 2	(Texas) NTX Rayados	San Antonio, Texas
7:30 PM CDT (UTC−05)	Touray (yellow card) 28' (goal) 64' 69'; Restrepo 49' (yellow card) 61'; James (yellow card) 54'; Soto 76' (pen.)	Report	Salas 12'; Rodríguez 19'	Stadium: Toyota Field; Attendance: 3,411; Referee: Luis Guardia

June 17, 2014 Fourth Round	FC Dallas (Texas)	2 – 0	(Texas) San Antonio Scorpions	Frisco, Texas
8:00 PM CDT (UTC−05)	Castillo 74'; Escobar (yellow card) 57' (goal) 81'	Report	Hassli (yellow card) 69'	Stadium: Toyota Stadium; Attendance: 2,296; Referee: Ted Unkel
