= 2012 San Antonio Scorpions FC season =

San Antonio Scorpions
2012 season
- Owner: Gordon Hartman
- Manager: Tim Hankinson
- Stadium: Toyota Field
- NASL: 1st
- NASL Playoffs: Semi-final
- U.S. Open Cup: Fourth round
- Top goalscorer: League: Pablo Campos (21); All: Pablo Campos (23)
- Highest home attendance: 13,151 (April 15 vs. Puerto Rico)
- Lowest home attendance: League: 7,007 (June 9 vs. Atlanta); All: 3,601 (May 22 vs. Laredo)
- Average home league attendance: League: 9,176; All: 8,366
| Home colors | Away colors |

The 2012 San Antonio Scorpions FC season was the club's first season of existence, and first year playing in the North American Soccer League, the second division of the American soccer pyramid. Including the San Antonio Thunder soccer franchise of the original NASL, this was the 3rd season of professional soccer in San Antonio. The Scorpions played at Heroes Stadium in San Antonio.

== Competitions ==
=== Preseason ===
| March 14, 2012 International friendly | San Antonio Scorpions FC (United States) | 3–0 | (Mexico) Dorados de Sinaloa | Stockton, California |
| 7:30 PST | | | | Stadium: Banner Island Ballpark |

=== North American Soccer League ===
==== Standings ====
| Pos | Team | Pld | W | D | L | GF | GA | GD | Pts | Qualification |
|---|---|---|---|---|---|---|---|---|---|---|
| 1 | San Antonio Scorpions (X) | 28 | 13 | 8 | 7 | 46 | 27 | +19 | 47 | Playoff semifinals |
| 2 | Tampa Bay Rowdies (C) | 28 | 12 | 9 | 7 | 37 | 30 | +7 | 45 | Playoff semifinals |
| 3 | Puerto Rico Islanders | 28 | 11 | 8 | 9 | 32 | 30 | +2 | 41 | Playoff quarterfinals |
| 4 | Carolina RailHawks | 28 | 10 | 10 | 8 | 44 | 46 | −2 | 40 | Playoff quarterfinals |
| 5 | Fort Lauderdale Strikers | 28 | 9 | 9 | 10 | 40 | 46 | −6 | 36 | Playoff quarterfinals |

Source: NASL Standings
Rules for classification: 1) points; 2) goal difference; 3) number of goals scored.
(C) Champions; (X) Commissioner's Cup (regular season champion)

==== Results summary ====
| Overall | | | | | | | | Home | | | | | | Away | | | | | |
| Pld | W | D | L | GF | GA | GD | Pts | W | D | L | GF | GA | GD | W | D | L | GF | GA | GD |
|---|---|---|---|---|---|---|---|---|---|---|---|---|---|---|---|---|---|---|---|
| 28 | 13 | 8 | 7 | 46 | 27 | +19 | 47 | 8 | 3 | 3 | 29 | 11 | +18 | 5 | 5 | 4 | 17 | 16 | +1 |

Last updated: September 23, 2012.
Source: Match reports

==== Results by round ====
| Round | 1 | 2 | 3 | 4 | 5 | 6 | 7 | 8 | 9 | 10 | 11 | 12 | 13 | 14 | 15 | 16 | 17 | 18 | 19 | 20 | 21 | 22 | 23 | 24 | 25 | 26 | 27 | 28 |
|---|---|---|---|---|---|---|---|---|---|---|---|---|---|---|---|---|---|---|---|---|---|---|---|---|---|---|---|---|
| Stadium | A | H | H | A | H | A | H | A | H | H | A | A | H | H | A | A | H | H | H | A | A | H | A | A | A | H | A | H |
| Result | D | L | D | W | W | W | W | D | D | W | W | L | W | W | L | D | W | W | L | D | W | W | L | D | W | L | L | D |

Updated to match(es) played on September 23, 2012. Source: Match reports
A = Away; H = Home; W = Win; D = Draw; L = Loss

==== Match reports ====
Kickoff times are in CDT (UTC−05) unless shown otherwise

Win Loss Draw

| April 7, 2012 Match 1 | Atlanta Silverbacks | 0–0 | San Antonio Scorpions FC | Atlanta |
| 18:30 CST | Moroney (yellow card) 38'; Navia (yellow card) 89' | Report | Campos (yellow card) 13'; Soto (yellow card) 91' | Stadium: Silverbacks Park; Attendance: 5,000; Referee: Daniel Fitzerald |

| April 15, 2012 Match 2 | San Antonio Scorpions FC | 0–4 | Puerto Rico Islanders | San Antonio, Texas |
| 18:00 CST | Kling (yellow card) 7' | Report | Fana 7'; Foley 20'; Edwards (yellow card) 53'; Addlery 56'; Fana 73'; DeRoux (yellow card) 85' | Stadium: Heroes Stadium; Attendance: 13,151; Referee: Jasen Anno |

| April 21, 2012 Match 3 | San Antonio Scorpions FC | 2–2 | Fort Lauderdale Strikers | San Antonio, Texas |
| 19:30 CST | Pitchkolan (yellow card) 16'; Harmse (yellow card) 22'; Campos 41'; Denissen 91'; Knight (red card) 91'; Tiago (red card) 91' | Report | Shanosky (yellow card) 10'; Herron 32' 51'; Morales (yellow card) 53'; Stahl (yellow card) 91' (yellow-red card) 91'; Thompson (red card) 91' | Stadium: Heroes Stadium; Attendance: 10,114; Referee: Matt Foerster |

| April 28, 2012 Match 4 | Carolina RailHawks FC | 0–1 | San Antonio Scorpions FC | Cary, North Carolina |
| 18:00 CST | | Report | Kling (yellow card) 12'; Harmse 82' | Stadium: WakeMed Soccer Park; Attendance: 3,041; Referee: Andrew Chapin |

| May 5, 2012 Match 5 | San Antonio Scorpions FC | 2–0 | Tampa Bay Rowdies | San Antonio, Texas |
| 19:30 CST | Kling (yellow card) 44'; Denissen 53' (pen.); Cochrane (yellow card) 61'; Pitchkolan 66' | Report | Arango (yellow card) 53'; Hill (yellow card) 90' | Stadium: Heroes Stadium; Attendance: 9,536; Referee: Hayer Reyes |

| May 12, 2012 Match 6 | Tampa Bay Rowdies | 1–2 | San Antonio Scorpions FC | St. Petersburg, Florida |
| 18:30 CST | Antoniuk 55'; Scott (yellow card) 62'; Hill (yellow card) 63'; Clare (yellow card) 89' | Report | Campos 53'; Ramirez (yellow card) 77'; Campos 90+4' | Stadium: Al Lang Field; Attendance: 3,166; Referee: Javier Santos |

| May 19, 2012 Match 7 | San Antonio Scorpions FC | 2–0 | FC Edmonton | San Antonio, Texas |
| 19:30 CST | Greenfield 40' (pen.); Harmse (yellow card) 61'; Cochrane 75' | Report | | Stadium: Heroes Stadium; Attendance: 8,310; Referee: Leszek Stalmach |

| May 27, 2012 Match 8 | FC Edmonton | 2–2 | San Antonio Scorpions FC | Edmonton, Alberta |
| 15:05 CST | Pinto 37'; Saiko 54'; Craig (yellow card) 56' | Report | Kling (yellow card) 56'; Soto 62'; Greenfield (yellow card) 68'; Pitchkolan (yellow card) 70'; Ramirez (yellow card) 80'; Pitchkolan 83'; Greenfield (yellow card) 89' | Stadium: Clarke Stadium; Attendance: 1,515; Referee: Sheena Dickson |

| June 2, 2012 Match 9 | San Antonio Scorpions FC | 0–0 | Minnesota Stars FC | San Antonio, Texas |
| 19:30 CST | | Report | Ibrahim (yellow card) 63' | Stadium: Heroes Stadium; Attendance: 8,639; Referee: Jorge Luna |

| June 9, 2012 Match 10 | San Antonio Scorpions FC | 3–0 | Atlanta Silverbacks | San Antonio, Texas |
| 19:30 CST | Campos 27', 83'; Ramírez 35'; Harmse (yellow card) 45'; Wagner (yellow card) 54' | Report | O'Brien (yellow card) 45' | Stadium: Heroes Stadium; Attendance: 7,007; Referee: Hayden Edwards |

| June 16, 2012 Match 11 | Puerto Rico Islanders | 0–2 | San Antonio Scorpions FC | Bayamón, Puerto Rico |
| 18:30 CST | Edward (yellow card) 45+1' (yellow-red card) 90'; Faña (yellow card) 67' | Report | Ramírez (yellow card) 17' (yellow-red card) 42'; Wagner (yellow card) 23'; Bayona 39'; Campos 70'; Pitchkolan (yellow card) 79'; Sattler (yellow card) 84'; Denissen (yellow card) 84' | Stadium: Juan Ramón Loubriel Stadium; Attendance: 1,551; Referee: (Puerto Rico) Javier Santos |

| June 23, 2012 Match 12 | Tampa Bay Rowdies | 3–2 | San Antonio Scorpions FC | St. Petersburg, Florida |
| 18:30 CST | Yoshitake 39', 90'; Mulholland 88' | Report | Greenfield 31'; Bayona 52'; Pitchkolan (yellow card) 59'; Harmse (yellow card) 71' | Stadium: Progress Energy Park; Attendance: 2,559; Referee: (United States) Christina Ibañez |

| June 30, 2012 Match 13 | San Antonio Scorpions FC | 3–0 | Atlanta Silverbacks | San Antonio, Texas |
| 19:30 CST | Cochrane (yellow card) 15'; Bayona 25'; Campos 63', 81' | Report | Lancaster (yellow card) 72'; Robertson (yellow card) 81'; Illyés (yellow card) 88' | Stadium: Heroes Stadium; Attendance: 11,912; Referee: (United States) Jasen Anno |

| July 4, 2012 Match 14 | San Antonio Scorpions FC | 1–0 | FC Edmonton | San Antonio, Texas |
| 19:30 CST | Wagner (yellow card) 33'; Bayona 66' | Report | Vorbe (yellow card) 19'; Saiko (yellow card) 60' | Stadium: Heroes Stadium; Attendance: 9,115; Referee: (United States) Matthew Foerster |

| July 11, 2012 Match 15 | Puerto Rico Islanders | 1–0 | San Antonio Scorpions FC | Bayamón, Puerto Rico |
| 19:30 CST | Addlery 24' vanSchaik (yellow card) 66' | Report | Ramírez (yellow card) 41'; Harmse (yellow card) 69' | Stadium: Juan Ramón Loubriel Stadium |

| July 14, 2012 Match 16 | Fort Lauderdale Strikers | 2–2 | San Antonio Scorpions FC | Fort Lauderdale, Florida |
| 18:30 CST | Lorenz (yellow card) 17'; Herron 28', 90'; Motagalvan (yellow card) 53' (yellow-red card) 71'; King (yellow card) 61'; Restrepo (yellow card) 69' | Report | Greenfield (yellow card) 26'; Campos 58', 90+2'; Cochrane (yellow card) 61' (yellow-red card) 62'; Pitchkolan (yellow card) 90' | Stadium: Lockhart Stadium; Attendance: 5,223 |

| July 21, 2012 Match 17 | San Antonio Scorpions FC | 1–0 | Fort Lauderdale Strikers | San Antonio, Texas |
| 19:30 CST | Janicki (yellow card) 9'; Harmse (yellow card) 28' (yellow-red card) 70'; Campos (yellow card) 48' (goal) 57' | Report | Herron (red card) 34'; Shanosky (yellow card) 45'; Motagalvan (yellow card) 70'; Stewart (yellow card) 87' | Stadium: Heroes Stadium; Attendance: 10,584 |

| July 28, 2012 Match 18 | San Antonio Scorpions FC | 8–0 | Carolina Railhawks FC | San Antonio, Texas |
| 19:30 CST | Janicki 5', 59'; Campos 15', 54' (pen.), 72', 81'; Bayona 61'; Wagner 65' | Summary | King (red card) 32'; Agbossoumonde (yellow card) 54' | Stadium: Heroes Stadium; Attendance: 7,186 |

| August 5, 2012 Match 19 | San Antonio Scorpions FC | 1–2 | Puerto Rico Islanders | San Antonio, Texas |
| 19:30 CST | Harmse (yellow card) 57'; Campos 70'; Pitchkolan (yellow card) 75'; Ramírez (yellow card) 84' | Summary | Addlery 31', 50' vanSchaik (yellow card) 59' | Stadium: Heroes Stadium; Attendance: 10,183 |

| August 8, 2012 Match 20 | FC Edmonton | 1–1 | San Antonio Scorpions FC | Edmonton, Alberta |
| 20:05 CST | Pinto 45+1'; Rago (yellow card) 88' | | Greenfield 23'; Knight (yellow card) 43'; Soto (yellow card) 65' (yellow-red card) 65'; Pitchkolan (yellow card) 73' | Stadium: Clarke Stadium; Attendance: 1,542 |

| August 11, 2012 Match 21 | Minnesota Stars FC | 0–1 | San Antonio Scorpions FC | Blaine, Minnesota |
| 19:30 CST | Kallman (yellow card) 88'; Nuñez (yellow card) 90+1' | Summary | Wagner (yellow card) 26'; Denissen 71' (pen.); Campos (yellow card) 77'; Knight (yellow card) 90+1' | Stadium: National Sports Center; Attendance: 3,221 |

| August 19, 2012 Match 22 | San Antonio Scorpions FC | 4–0 | Tampa Bay Rowdies | San Antonio, Texas |
| 19:30 CST | Ramírez 8'; Campos 17', 29'; Sattler (yellow card) 56'; Bayona 90+2' | Summary | Sanfilippo (yellow card) 45'; Washington (yellow card) 49'; Mulholland (yellow card) 52'; Ambersley (yellow card) 56' | Stadium: Heroes Stadium; Attendance: 7,024 |

| August 25, 2012 Match 23 | Fort Lauderdale Strikers | 2–1 | San Antonio Scorpions FC | Fort Lauderdale, Florida |
| 18:30 CST | Anderson (yellow card) 26'; Ramos (yellow card) 52'; Thompson 59' (pen.), 69'; Gordon (yellow card) 81' | Summary | Ramírez (yellow card) 45+1'; Janicki (yellow card) 63'; Saavedra 83' | Stadium: Lockhart Stadium; Attendance: 3,268 |

| September 1, 2012 Match 24 | Minnesota Stars FC | 1–1 | San Antonio Scorpions FC | Blaine, Minnesota |
| 19:30 CST | Walker 33'; Takada (yellow card) 45'; Kallman (yellow card) 63' | Summary | Pitchkolan (yellow card) 15'; Janicki (yellow card) 60'; Denissen 69' (yellow card) 73'; Harmse (yellow card) 79' | Stadium: National Sports Center; Attendance: 1,705 |

| September 8, 2012 Match 25 | Carolina Railhawks FC | 0–1 | San Antonio Scorpions FC | Cary, North Carolina |
| 18:30 CST | Shipalane (yellow card) 90' | Summary | Harmse (yellow card) 35'; Cunningham 84' | Stadium: WakeMed Soccer Park; Attendance: 5,807 |
Note: 25th regular season NASL match

| September 16, 2012 Match 26 | San Antonio Scorpions FC | 1–2 | Carolina Railhawks FC | San Antonio, Texas |
| 18:00 CST | Greenfield (yellow card) 41'; Campos 64' (yellow card) 64' | Summary | Agbossoumonde 42'; Shipalane 69' | Stadium: Heroes Stadium; Attendance: 7,701 |

| September 19, 2012 Match 27 | Atlanta Silverbacks | 3–1 | San Antonio Scorpions FC | Atlanta |
| 18:30 CST | Hunt 3'; Blanco (yellow card) 31'; Wagner 40' (o.g.); Paulini (yellow card) 45'; Ferreira-Mendes 75' | Summary | Harmse (yellow card) 30'; Soto 68' (yellow card) 77'; Wagner (yellow card) 83'; Pitchkolan (yellow card) 90' | Stadium: Atlanta Silverbacks Park; Attendance: 2,357 |

| September 23, 2012 Match 28 | San Antonio Scorpions FC | 1–1 | Minnesota Stars FC | San Antonio, Texas |
| 18:00 CST | Campos 9'; Denisson (yellow card) 11'; Pitchkolan (yellow card) 52'; Cochrane (yellow card) 78'; Janicki (yellow card) 83' | Summary | Venegas (yellow card) 47'; Rodríguez (yellow card) 58'; Friedland 69' | Stadium: Heroes Stadium; Attendance: 7,996 |

=== NASL Playoffs ===
| October 6, 2012 SF – 1st Leg | Minnesota Stars | 0–0 | San Antonio Scorpions | Blaine, Minnesota |
| 7:30 pm CDT | Bracalello (yellow card) 21' | Report; Report | Harmse (yellow card) 86' | Stadium: National Sports Center; Attendance: 2,006; Referee: Marcos Deoliveira |

| October 14, 2012 SF – 2nd Leg | San Antonio Scorpions | 1–2 | Minnesota Stars | San Antonio, Texas |
| 6:15 pm CDT | Ramirez (yellow card) 17'; Campos 25' (red card) 27'; Harmse (yellow card) 54'; Soto (yellow card) 89' | Report; Report | Altman (yellow card) 28'; Hlavaty (yellow card) 67'; Wagner 76' (o.g.); Bracalello 83' | Stadium: Heroes Stadium; Attendance: 6,249; Referee: Daniel Fitzgerald |

=== U.S. Open Cup ===
| May 22, 2012 Second round | San Antonio Scorpions (Texas) | 2–0 | (Texas) Laredo Heat | San Antonio, Texas |
| 19:30 CST | Kling (yellow card) 24'; Ramirez (red card) 25'; Greenfield (yellow card) 25'; Denissen (yellow card) 34'; Campos 67'; Harmse 74' | Report | Leal (yellow card) 41'; Lopez (yellow card) 44'; Villavicencio (red card) 47'; Nava (yellow card) 70'; Nava (yellow card) 77' (red card) | Stadium: Blossom Athletic Center; Attendance: 3,601; Referee: Luis Guardia |

| May 29, 2012 Third round | San Antonio Scorpions (Texas) | 1–0 | (Texas) Houston Dynamo | San Antonio, Texas |
| 19:30 CST | Denissen 51' (pen.) | Report | | Stadium: Heroes Stadium; Attendance: 7,164 |

| June 5, 2012 Fourth round | San Antonio Scorpions (Texas) | 1–2 (a.e.t.) | (North Carolina) Charlotte Eagles | San Antonio, Texas |
| 19:30 CST | Campos (yellow card) 38' (goal) 75'; Pitchkolan (yellow card) 71' | Report | Grousis 28'; Salles 116' (pen.) | Stadium: Heroes Stadium; Attendance: 5,112 |

== Club information ==
=== Roster ===
As of May 11, 2012

| No. | Name | Nationality | Position | Date of birth (age) | Previous club |
Goalkeepers
| 00 | Craig Hill | (United States) | GK | December 27, 1987 (age 38) | River Plate Puerto Rico |
| 1 | Daryl Sattler | (United States) | GK | September 5, 1980 (age 46) | (United States) FC Tampa Bay |
| 25 | Patrick Hannigan | (United States) | GK | October 23, 1982 (age 44) | (United States) Rochester Lancers (indoor) |
Defenders
| 2 | Wes Knight | (United States) | DF/MF | September 6, 1986 (age 40) | Unattached |
| 3 | Dominic Papa | (United States) | DF | October 10, 1987 (age 39) | (United States) FC Tucson |
| 5 | Karsten Smith | (United States) | DF | June 14, 1988 (age 38) | Unattached |
| 12 | Greg Janicki | (United States) | DF | July 9, 1984 (age 42) | (Canada) Vancouver Whitecaps FC |
| 13 | Fabian Kling | (Germany) | DF | July 24, 1987 (age 39) | (United States) Fort Lewis Skyhawks |
| 16 | Aaron Pitchkolan | (United States) | DF/MF | March 14, 1983 (age 43) | Puerto Rico Islanders |
| 19 | Ryan Cochrane | (United States) | CB | August 8, 1983 (age 43) | (United States) New England Revolution |
| 22 | Jonathan Greenfield | (South Africa) | DF | February 18, 1982 (age 44) | Unattached |
Midfielders
| 4 | Matt Gold | (United States) | MF | June 14, 1988 (age 38) | Unattached |
| 6 | Kevin Harmse | (Canada) | DF/MF | July 4, 1984 (age 42) | Unattached |
| 7 | Luiz Tiago | (Brazil) | MF | March 7, 1988 (age 38) | Unattatched |
| 8 | Jeff Jennings | (United States) | MF | November 6, 1987 (age 39) | (Republic of Ireland) Mount Merrion FC |
| 17 | Blake Wagner | (United States) | DF/MF | January 29, 1988 (age 38) | (United States) Real Salt Lake |
| 18 | Josue Soto | (United States) | MF | January 3, 1989 (age 37) | (United States) Houston Dynamo (on loan) |
| 20 | Amaury Nunes | (Brazil) | MF/FW | January 26, 1983 (age 43) | (Hong Kong) Citizen |
| 21 | Walter Ramírez | (Honduras) | DF/MF | November 7, 1983 (age 43) | (Honduras) C.D. Vida |
| 23 | Javier Saavedra | (Mexico) | MF | March 13, 1974 (age 52) | (Mexico) Tigres UANL |
Forwards
| 9 | Pablo Campos | (Brazil) | FW | January 29, 1983 (age 43) | (United States) Carolina RailHawks |
| 10 | Hans Denissen | (Netherlands) | FW | March 9, 1984 (age 42) | (Netherlands) Willem II |
| 11 | Esteban Bayona | (Colombia) | FW | November 25, 1983 (age 42) | (United States) Laredo Heat |
| 14 | Euan Purcell | (England) | FW | August 14, 1985 (age 41) | Unattached |
