= List of North American Soccer League seasons =

The North American Soccer League was the second division of professional soccer in the United States from 2011 to 2017. Each season consisted of 7–12 teams and also included clubs from Canada and Puerto Rico.

== List of seasons ==
The following is a list of all NASL seasons. It contains the number of teams, the number of regular-season games played per team, the champion—winner of the NASL Soccer Bowl, the winners of the regular-season (North American Supporters' Trophy), starting in 2013 the winner of the Spring and a Fall seasons, the winner of the Most Valuable Player Award (MVP), the top scorer(s)—winner of the Golden Boot, and the regular-season average attendance.

Season	Teams	Games	Champion	Top record	Spring	Fall	MVP	Top scorer	Att.	Ref
2011	8	28	NSC Minnesota Stars	Carolina RailHawks	—	—	Etienne Barbara	Etienne Barbara	3,770	
2012	8	28	Tampa Bay Rowdies	San Antonio Scorpions	—	—	Pablo Campos	Pablo Campos	3,806	
2013	8	26	New York Cosmos	Carolina RailHawks	Atlanta Silverbacks	New York Cosmos	Georgi Hristov	Brian Shriver	4,670	
2014	10	27	San Antonio Scorpions	Minnesota United	Minnesota United	San Antonio Scorpions	Miguel Ibarra	Christian Ramirez	5,501	
2015	11	30	New York Cosmos	New York Cosmos	New York Cosmos	Ottawa Fury FC				
2016	12	32	New York Cosmos	New York Cosmos	Indy Eleven	New York Cosmos				
2017	8	32	San Francisco Deltas	Miami FC	Miami FC	Miami FC				

== See also ==
- List of American and Canadian soccer champions
