= Crocketteers =

- Established: March 6, 2009
- Type: Supporters' group
- Team: San Antonio FC, Crocketteers FC
- Motto: Victory or Death
- Location: San Antonio
- Membership: 950
- Website: www.crocketteers.com

The Crocketteers are an independent soccer supporters group based in San Antonio, Texas. The group was founded in March 2009 to unite soccer fans in San Antonio, Texas, in an effort to bring professional soccer to the Alamo City. The Crocketteers built their brand to honor the heroes of the Battle of the Alamo. Their motto is simply "Victory or Death" as written by William B. Travis during their 13 days of glory defending San Antonio's most important landmark, The Alamo.

== History ==
In March 2009, Michael Macias founded the Crocketteers after discussing with friends ways of building support for a professional soccer franchise in the Alamo City. The initial idea behind the Crocketteers was to grow a strong membership base in the name of San Antonio professional soccer. They believed that as their membership numbers rose, the city of San Antonio would rise above other cities in contention for a professional soccer franchise.

In one year's span, the Crocketteers had 70 basic members under their banner. It wasn't until 2010, that their membership numbers grew considerably. During the 2010 World Cup, the group organized a successful series of US Men's National Team World Cup Watch Parties at Alamo Drafthouse, which brought a combined attendance of about 900 San Antonio soccer fans together.

The Crocketteers during the 2010 World Cup Final on The Lion & Rose English Double Decker Bus.

The group also co-hosted a World Cup Championship Watch Party at the AT&T Center which drew over 800 soccer fans. The event "was billed as the largest in town" and was considered "a success for the grassroots organization, which is trying to convince investors to pony up to bring a (professional) soccer team to San Antonio." At the culmination of 2010 FIFA World Cup, the Crocketteers had a total of 160 charter members known as the Travis 250.

The Crocketteers didn't have to wait too long before those investors came through. It was announced on October 4, 2010, that San Antonio was awarded an expansion franchise in the North American Soccer League beginning in 2012. The San Antonio NASL 2012 team's ownership group is led by San Antonio businessman and philanthropist Gordon Hartman, "who recently developed the 14-field STAR Soccer Complex and neighboring Morgan's Wonderland, the world's first-ultra accessible family fun park designed specifically for children and adults with special needs and the entire community to enjoy."

Two weeks after the NASL's San Antonio expansion announcement, NASL CEO/Commissioner Aaron Davidson praised the Crocketteers at a soccer exhibition in San Antonio benefiting the victims of hurricanes in Mexico, stating "Hats off to the Crocketteers Supporters Group for their advocacy of pro soccer in (the San Antonio area)."

Currently, the Crocketteers are one of two supporters group of San Antonio FC.

== Membership ==
The Crocketteers membership base is roughly split 50/50 between basic members and charter members. The initial 250 charter members is part of a subgroup known as the Travis 250. Charter members are paid members whereas basic members are not.

The Travis 250 represent the nearly 250 people who died during the “13 days of glory” back in 1836 at the Battle of the Alamo. As of November 10, 2010 the Travis 250 membership has sold out.

A new subgroup of the Crocketteers was formed called the "Brigade". Members of the brigade receive similar membership privileges as the Travis 250 members but are annual memberships and must be renewed each year. There is no limit to the number of members in the Brigade subgroup, and the current number for the Brigade sits at 368.
