= STAR Soccer Complex =

Soccer venue in Texas

- Interactive map of STAR Soccer Complex
- Location: San Antonio, TX, USA
- Coordinates: 29.541183°N 98.393214°W
- Owner: Sports Outdoor and Recreation; Gordon Hartman Family Foundation
- Operator: Sports Outdoor and Recreation; Gordon Hartman Family Foundation
- Surface: TEXTURF 10 Bermuda Grass

Construction
- Groundbreaking: 2009
- Opened: 2010

Tenant
- San Antonio FC (practice facility)

The South Texas Area Regional Soccer Complex is a 13 field soccer venue in San Antonio, Texas, United States. It is used primarily for youth club soccer and adult league soccer. It is located in the former Longhorn Quarry, adjacent to Toyota Field, and Morgan's Wonderland, and near Heroes Stadium.

Toyota Field was originally owned and operated by S.O.A.R. Inc., a non-profit organization founded by Gordon Hartman. The complex was affiliated with the San Antonio Scorpions of the North American Soccer League, also owned by Hartman. On December 22, 2015, it was announced that Toyota Field and S.T.A.R. Soccer Complex were sold to the City of San Antonio and Bexar County.

== See also ==
- San Antonio FC
