= David Bingham (American soccer) =

American soccer player (born 1989)

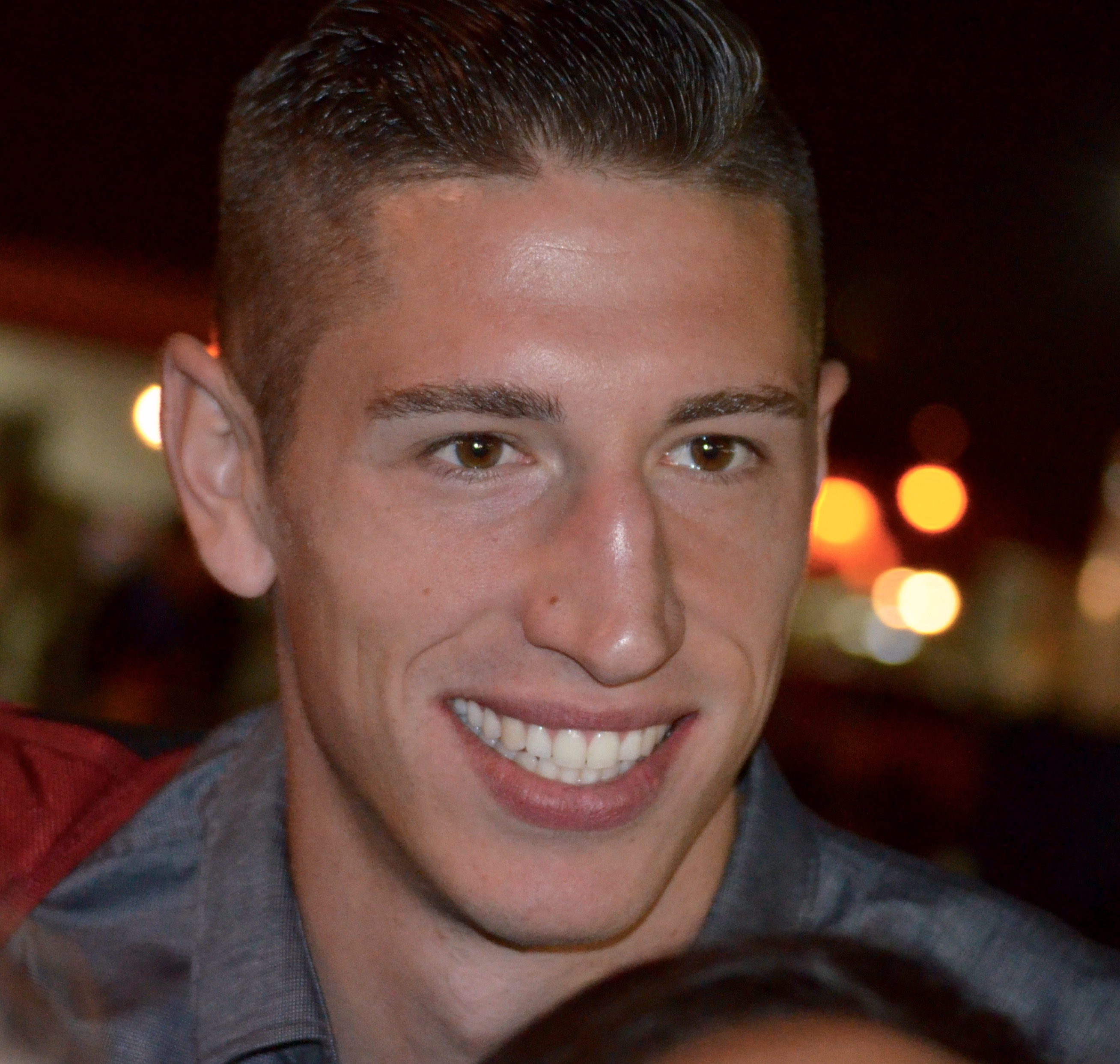
- Bingham in 2015

Personal information
- Full name: David Matthew Bingham
- Date of birth: October 19, 1989 (age 37)
- Place of birth: Castro Valley, California, U.S.
- Height: 6 ft 2 in (1.88 m)
- Position: Goalkeeper

College career
Years	Team	Apps	(Gls)
2008–2010	California Golden Bears	37	(0)

Senior career*
Years	Team	Apps	(Gls)
2009	NorCal Lamorinda United SC		
2011–2017	San Jose Earthquakes	96	(0)
2014	→ San Antonio Scorpions (loan)	10	(0)
2014	→ Strømmen IF (loan)	9	(0)
2018–2020	LA Galaxy	85	(0)
2022–2023	Portland Timbers	8	(0)
2024–2025	Charlotte FC	2	(0)

International career^{‡}
2016–2017	United States	3	(0)
- * Club domestic league appearances and goals as of October 22, 2025 ‡ National team caps and goals as of February 3, 2017

David Matthew Bingham (born October 19, 1989) is an American professional soccer player who plays as a goalkeeper.

== Youth ==
Bingham was born October 19, 1989, in Castro Valley, California, to his parents Greg and Lisa Bingham. Bingham played for the youth club, Mustang Soccer Club based out of Danville, California. In 2007, his club team made it to the Super- Y league National Championships. Bingham was a member of the Super-Y national team in 2006 and 2007. He had 13 shutouts and had a 0.60 goals against average during his senior year in high school. Bingham was a member of both the Bay Areas All-Area team as well as the all Tri-Valley team's first selection.

== Career ==
=== College ===
Bingham played his college career at the University of California, Berkeley between the years of 2008 and 2010. Bingham led the Golden Bears to the quarterfinals of the NCAA Tournament in 2010, where they fell to eventual NCAA Champion Akron Zips on penalties. In 2009, Bingham earned himself All-Pac-10 second team honors and posted a 0.95 goals against average. The majority of his 2008 year was spent as backup to Stefan Frei.

=== Professional ===
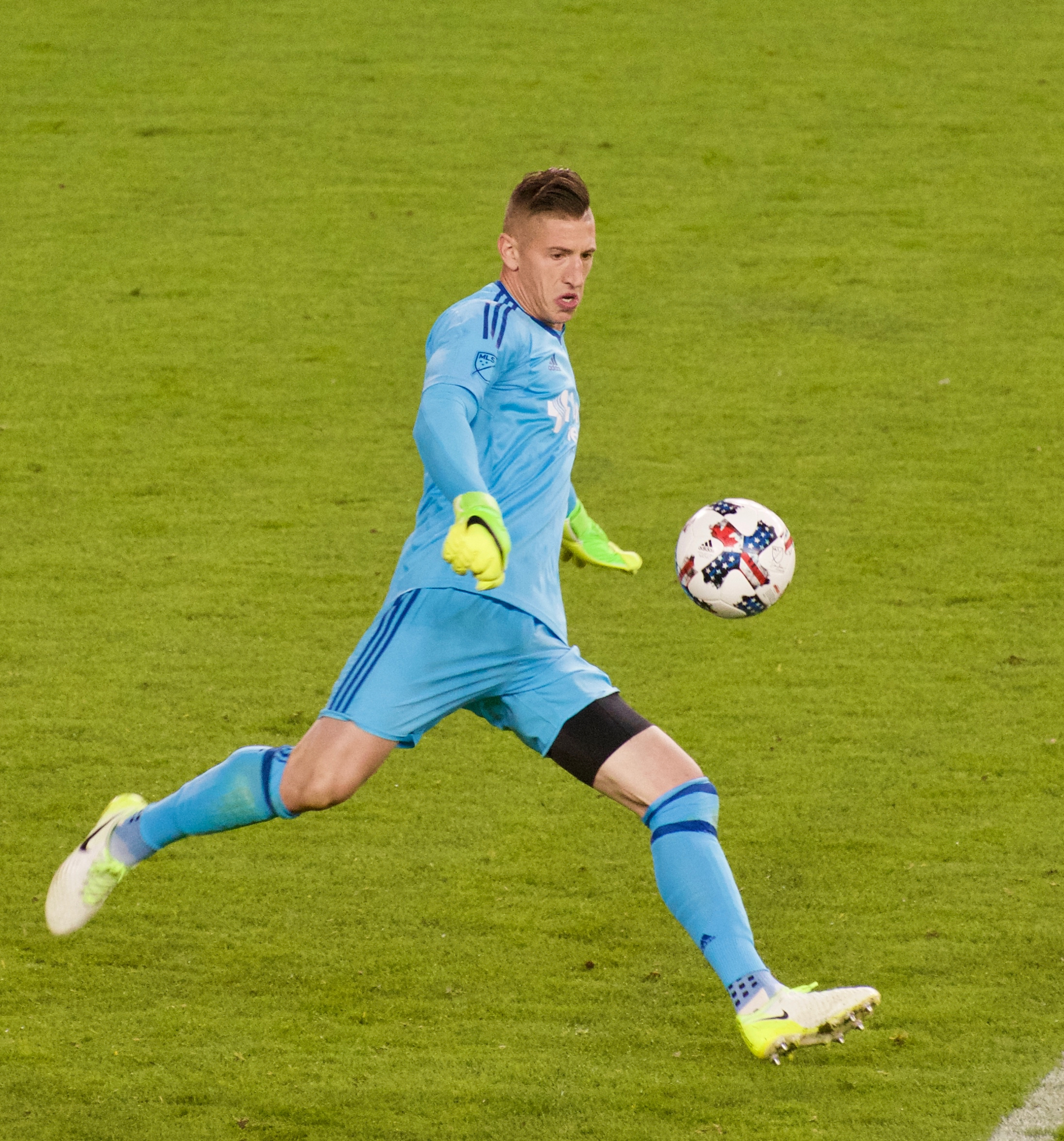
Bingham playing for San Jose Earthquakes in 2017

Bingham signed a Generation Adidas contract with Major League Soccer soon after the 2011 MLS SuperDraft. Due to signing post-SuperDraft, Bingham was allocated to an MLS team via a weighted lottery. He was awarded to San Jose Earthquakes, the team he supported as a boy, on January 26, 2011.

He scored a goal on a 90-yard clearance from his own penalty box on July 13, 2011, against West Bromwich Albion in an exhibition match at Buck Shaw Stadium.

After spending time on loan with the San Antonio Scorpions and Strømmen IF, Bingham emerged as a starter for the Earthquakes during the 2015 season.

Bingham was traded to the LA Galaxy on December 18, 2017.

On January 13, 2022, after a year without a club, Bingham signed a two-year deal with Portland Timbers.

On January 30, 2024, Bingham signed as a free agent with Charlotte FC.

=== International ===
Bingham made his debut with the United States national team on February 5, 2016, against Canada, playing the full match and keeping a clean sheet in a 1–0 victory.

== Career statistics ==
As of matches played on October 21, 2023

Appearances and goals by club, season and competition
Club	Season	League			National cup		Continental		Other		Total	
Club	Season	Division	Apps	Goals	Apps	Goals	Apps	Goals	Apps	Goals	Apps	Goals
San Jose Earthquakes	2011	MLS	1	0	0	0	—		—		1	0
San Jose Earthquakes	2012	MLS	3	0	3	0	—		0	0	6	0
San Jose Earthquakes	2013	MLS	1	0	1	0	3	0	—		5	0
San Jose Earthquakes	2014	MLS	0	0	2	0	0	0	—		2	0
San Jose Earthquakes	2015	MLS	34	0	0	0	—		—		34	0
San Jose Earthquakes	2016	MLS	34	0	0	0	—		—		34	0
San Jose Earthquakes	2017	MLS	23	0	0	0	—		0	0	23	0
San Jose Earthquakes	Total		96	0	6	0	3	0	0	0	105	0
San Antonio Scorpions (loan)	2014	NASL	10	0	0	0	—		—		10	0
Strømmen (loan)	2014	1. divisjon	9	0	0	0	—		—		9	0
LA Galaxy	2018	MLS	34	0	1	0	—		—		35	0
LA Galaxy	2019	MLS	33	0	1	0	—		2	0	36	0
LA Galaxy	2020	MLS	20	0	—		—		—		20	0
LA Galaxy	Total		87	0	2	0	—		2	0	91	0
Portland Timbers	2022	MLS	2	0	1	0	—		—		3	0
Portland Timbers	2023	MLS	19	0	1	0	—		1	0	21	0
Portland Timbers	Total		21	0	2	0	—		1	0	24	0
Career total			223	0	10	0	3	0	3	0	239	0

== Personal ==
Bingham has one sister, Kimberly Bingham, who played goalkeeper at Arizona State University and later for the U.S. Women's National Soccer Team.
