= Edin Husić =

Bosnian footballer (born 1985)

Personal information
- Date of birth: 10 November 1985 (age 40)
- Place of birth: Tuzla, SR Bosnia, Yugoslavia
- Height: 1.85 m (6 ft 1 in)
- Position: Midfielder

Senior career*
Years	Team	Apps	(Gls)
2004	Dinamo Zagreb	0	(0)
2004–2007	Orašje	78	(8)
2007–2010	Cibalia	71	(10)
2010–2012	Karlovac	40	(3)
2012	Sarajevo	14	(2)
2012	→ Zvijezda Gradačac (loan)	4	(0)
2013	San Antonio Scorpions	19	(1)
2014	Sloboda Tuzla	11	(1)
2014	Gradina	13	(3)
2015	Radnički Lukavac	13	(2)
2015–2016	Mladost DK	14	(0)
2016	FC Kray	12	(3)
2017–2018	FSV Duisburg	44	(9)
2018–2020	SV Hönnepel-Niedermörmter	51	(16)
2020–2021	DJK Vierlinden	4	(1)
Total		388	(59)

International career
2004-2006	Bosnia U21	11	(0)
2006–2008	Bosnia and Herzegovina	3	(0)

Managerial career
- 2021–202?: Schwarz-Weiß Essen (youth coach)
- * Club domestic league appearances and goals

Edin Husić (born 10 November 1985) is a retired Bosnian former professional footballer who played as a forward.

In 2014 Husić joined FK Sloboda Tuzla. He has spent the latter years of his career in the German lower leagues.

== International career ==
Husić made his debut for Bosnia and Herzegovina in a May 2006 friendly match away against South Korea and has earned a total of two caps (and one unofficial), scoring no goals. His second international was a June 2008 friendly match against Azerbaijan.

== Coaching career ==
Following his playing career, Husić worked as a youth coach for Schwarz-Weiß Essen, a club located in Essen, where Husić also resided. Later, Husić opened his own football school, 'Edin Husic Fußballschule'.
