= César Elizondo =

Costa Rican footballer (born 1988)

Personal information
- Full name: César Gerardo Elizondo Quesada
- Date of birth: 10 February 1988 (age 38)
- Place of birth: Pérez Zeledón, Costa Rica
- Height: 1.72 m (5 ft 7 1/2 in)
- Position: Striker

Youth career
- Saprissa

Senior career*
Years	Team	Apps	(Gls)
2007–2013	Saprissa	53	(7)
2010	→ Bayamón (loan)		
2010–2011	→ Pérez Zeledón (loan)	22	(5)
2013	Buriram United		(2)
2013–2014	Carolina RailHawks	29	(4)
2014–2015	San Antonio Scorpions	36	(8)
2016	Pérez Zeledón	18	(4)
2016–2018	San Antonio FC	47	(8)
2019–2020	Pérez Zeledón	45	(6)
2021–2022	Fútbol Consultants		

International career
2005	Costa Rica U-17	4	(3)
2007	Costa Rica U-20	4	(1)
2011	Costa Rica	10	(0)
- * Club domestic league appearances and goals

César Gerardo Elizondo Quesada (born 10 February 1988) is a Costa Rican former footballer who played as a striker.

== Club career ==
His debut with Deportivo Saprissa in 2005 with 17 years old after the U-17 World Cup in Peru, then in 2007 played the U-20 World Cup in Canada the same year he signed his professional contract for Deportivo Saprissa where he achieved 3 national titles and a second place in CONCACAF Champions League.

For one season also played for Pérez Zeledón in 2009, in December 2012 left Saprissa and went to Thai Premier League Champions Buriram United where he won a Toyota Cup Championship.

In 2013 he came to the NASL where he made his debut for Carolina RailHawks. After a year in North Carolina, Elizondo moved to the Alamo City with San Antonio Scorpions. He scored 5 goals as San Antonio won the Fall Season Title and the NASL 2014 Championship. In the 2015 season he scored 3 goals. At the end of the 2015 season the franchise ceased operations.

== International career ==
He played in the 2005 FIFA U-17 World Championship held in Peru where he scored the winning second round qualifying goal for his country and was named in the top 10 players of the World Cup Elizondo also participated in the 2007 FIFA U-20 World Cup held in Canada.

He made his senior debut for Costa Rica in a January 2011 Copa Centroamericana match against Honduras and has, as of May 2014, earned a total of 10 caps.
