= Daryl Sattler =

American soccer player (born 1980)

Personal information
- Date of birth: September 5, 1980 (age 46)
- Place of birth: Miami, Florida, U.S.
- Height: 6 ft 2 in (1.88 m)
- Position: Goalkeeper

College career
Years	Team	Apps	(Gls)
2000–2003	Western Kentucky Hilltoppers		

Senior career*
Years	Team	Apps	(Gls)
2003–2004	Nashville Metros	34	(0)
2005	Memphis Express	5	(0)
2006	Nashville Metros	14	(0)
2007–2008	Atlanta Silverbacks	0	(0)
2009	Wilmington Hammerheads	13	(0)
2010–2011	FC Tampa Bay	28	(0)
2012	San Antonio Scorpions	26	(0)
2013	Minnesota United FC	6	(0)
2014–2015	San Antonio Scorpions	12	(0)

Managerial career
- 2004–2006: Lipscomb Bisons (goalkeeping)
- 2006: Jacksonville Dolphins (goalkeeping)
- 2016–2017: Jacksonville Armada (goalkeeping)
- 2018–2021: Flagler Saints (women's assistant)
- 2019–: Jacksonville FC (goalkeeping)
- 2022–: North Florida Ospreys (goalkeeping)
- * Club domestic league appearances and goals as of July 6, 2023

Daryl Sattler (born September 5, 1980) is an American retired soccer player who is currently a goalkeeping coach with the North Florida Ospreys men's soccer team.

== Career ==
=== College ===
Sattler played college soccer at Western Kentucky University where he started in the net all four years. He currently holds the WKU school record for career shutouts with 19.5, served as team captain and was named team MVP in 2002 and 2003, was named to the Missouri Valley Conference the MVC All-Freshman Team and to the All-Tournament Second Team in as a senior in 2003.

=== Professional ===
Sattler turned professional in 2003 with the Nashville Metros, and was the team's first-choice goalkeeper for 2003, 2004 and 2006. He spent the 2005 season with the Memphis Express. He made 89 saves during the 2006 season, and was ranked second in the league for saves. During his stint with the Metros he was named team MVP, and was a member of the All Southern Conference team in 2003.

Sattler moved to the Atlanta Silverbacks in the USL First Division in 2007 season, but never made a senior appearance for the team, spending his entire Silverbacks tenure as backup to first choice goalkeepers Ryan McIntosh and Felipe Quintero.

After Atlanta announced their season-long hiatus at the end of the 2008 season, Sattler moved to the Wilmington Hammerheads in 2009, and was the Hammerheads starting keeper until suffering a season-ending groin injury on July 17, 2009.

Sattler joined FC Tampa Bay of the North American Soccer League in 2010. In January 2012 he signed with expansion side San Antonio Scorpions FC in the NASL who would go on to win the Regular Season Title in their Inaugural Season with Sattler as their starting GK, winning the NASL Golden Gloves Award. He signed with expansion side Minnesota United FC in 2013, but was injured early in the season. In 2014, he re-signed with San Antonio and became NASL Champions.

=== Coaching ===
After graduating college, Sattler turned down a USL Pro contract and focused his sights on coaching the game while he played for the local Nashville Metros. In the fall of 2004, Sattler became the assistant men's soccer coach & head goalkeeping coach for the Lipscomb Bisons. In 2006, he moved to Jacksonville University to be the assistant men's soccer coach & head goalkeeping coach for the Jacksonville Dolphins.

Sattler returned to coaching in 2016, joining the staff of the North American Soccer League's Jacksonville Armada. Sattler became an assistant coach with the Flagler Saints women's team in 2018.

In May 2022, Sattler joined the University of North Florida men's soccer team as a volunteer goalkeeping coach.

== Honors ==
2009 Wilmington Hammerheads

  -USL-Div-2  Regular Season Champions

2010 Tampa Bay Rowdies

  -USSF Div-2  Voted Team MVP & Best Defensive Player by Ralphs MOB (team supporters group)

2012 = San Antonio Scorpions

  -NASL  Regular Season Champions  
  -NASL Golden Glove Award with 0.79 GAA in 24 games, 13 shutouts in League Play

- 2014-2015 = San Antonio Scorpions (NASL)

    - National Champions

___________________________________

- 2016-2017 = Jacksonville Armada FC

    - Head GK coach & Academy GK Director

- 2017–Present = EPIC Goalkeeping is born (EPICGK.com)
- 2018–Present = Flagler College

     -2018 & 2019 Goalkeeper of the Year 
     -2019 Final Four Appearance 
     - 23–1–1 record (ranked #1 in nation)

- 2019–Present = Jacksonville FC

     -Director of Goalkeeping
