= Tomasz Zahorski =

Polish footballer (born 1984)

Personal information
- Full name: Tomasz Zahorski
- Date of birth: 22 November 1984 (age 41)
- Place of birth: Barczewo, Poland
- Height: 1.88 m (6 ft 2 in)
- Position: Forward

Team information
- Current team: Poland U19 (assistant coach)

Senior career*
Years	Team	Apps	(Gls)
- Pisa Barczewo
- Stomil Olsztyn
2003	Tęcza Biskupiec		
2004	Pisa Barczewo		
2004–2005	OKS 1945 Olsztyn		
2006	Dyskobolia Grodzisk	17	(2)
2007	Górnik Łęczna	13	(4)
2007–2011	Górnik Zabrze	109	(26)
2012	MSV Duisburg	4	(0)
2012	Jagiellonia Białystok	4	(0)
2013	Górnik Zabrze	8	(1)
2013–2014	San Antonio Scorpions	33	(15)
2015	Charlotte Independence	17	(3)
2016	GKS Katowice	9	(2)
2016–2018	Stomil Olsztyn	26	(0)
2020	Pisa Barczewo	5	(1)

International career
2007–2009	Poland	13	(1)

Managerial career
- 2020–2021: Poland U17 (assistant)
- 2021–2022: Poland U19 (assistant)
- 2022–2023: Poland U18 (assistant)
- 2023–: Poland U19 (assistant)
- * Club domestic league appearances and goals

Tomasz Zahorski (Polish pronunciation: [ˈtɔmaʐ zaˈxɔrskʲi]; born 22 November 1984) is a Polish former professional footballer who played as a forward. He currently serves as an assistant coach for the Poland national under-19 team.

== Club career ==
Born in Barczewo, Zahorski began his career playing for local club Pisa Barczewo, from where he moved to OKS 1945 Olsztyn. Later, he played for Tęcza Biskupiec before returning to Pisa. In the 2004–05 season, he moved back to Olsztyn, where he played until the autumn of 2005. In the spring of the 2005–06 season, he began playing for Dyskobolia Grodzisk Wielkopolski. On 4 March 2006, Zahorski scored on his Ekstraklasa debut in a 1–2 loss against Wisła Kraków, with Zahorski getting on the scoresheet in the 85th minute, only a minute after coming on the pitch. In early 2007, he was loaned to Górnik Łęczna.

=== Górnik Zabrze ===
On 14 June 2007, Zahorski signed a contract with Górnik Zabrze, for a fee reported to be approx. 800,000 PLN. His good form resulted in a call-up to the Poland national team from Leo Beenhakker in late 2007. Across the 2007–08 season, he scored 10 league goals, including a goal in the Silesian Derby against Ruch Chorzów on 2 March 2008. After four and a half years, Zahorski left Zabrze, to move to German 2. Bundesliga club MSV Duisburg.

== Career statistics ==
=== International ===
Appearances and goals by national team and year
National team	Year	Apps	Goals
Poland
Poland	2007	3	0
Poland	2008	9	1
Poland	2009	1	0
Total		13	1

Scores and results list Poland's goal tally first, score column indicates score after each Zahorski goal.

List of international goals scored by Tomasz Zahorski
No.	Date	Venue	Opponent	Score	Result	Competition
1	17 February 2008	Amica Stadium, Wronki, Poland	Estonia	2–0	2–0	Friendly

== Honours ==
Groclin Grodzisk Wielkopolski

- Polish Cup: 2006–07
- Ekstraklasa Cup: 2006–07
