= Blake Wagner =

American professional soccer coach and former player (born 1988)

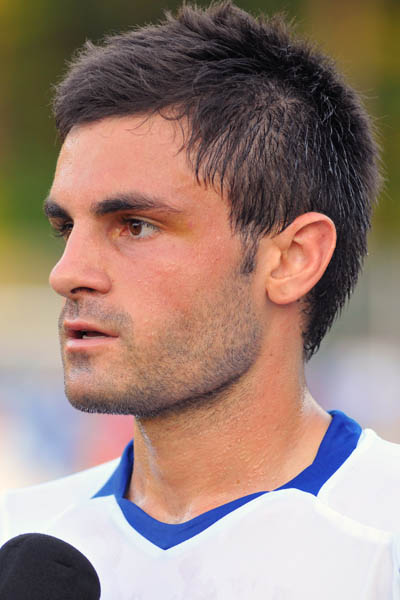

Personal information
- Full name: Blake Wagner
- Date of birth: January 29, 1988 (age 38)
- Place of birth: Atlanta, Georgia, United States
- Height: 5 ft 10 in (1.78 m)
- Positions: Defender; midfielder

Youth career
- 2003–2005: IMG Soccer Academy

Senior career*
| Years | Team | Apps | (Gls) |
| 2006–2009 | FC Dallas | 37 | (0) |
| 2010 | Vancouver Whitecaps | 19 | (4) |
| 2011 | Vancouver Whitecaps FC | 9 | (0) |
| 2011 | → Vancouver Whitecaps FC U-23 (loan) | 2 | (0) |
| 2011 | Real Salt Lake | 2 | (0) |
| 2012–2013 | San Antonio Scorpions | 45 | (3) |
| 2014 | Tampa Bay Rowdies | 21 | (3) |
| 2015 | Carolina RailHawks | 22 | (2) |

International career^{‡}
| 2003–2005 | United States U17 | 24 | (1) |
| 2006–2007 | United States U20 | 9 | (0) |
| 2008 | United States U23 | 3 | (0) |

Managerial career
- 2017: Tampa Bay Rowdies U23 (assistant)
- 2021–: Tampa Bay United (assistant)
- * Club domestic league appearances and goals as of April 13, 2016 ‡ National team caps and goals as of July 18, 2012

Blake Wagner (born January 29, 1988) is an American soccer coach and former player who currently is the assistant coach of USL League Two side, Tampa Bay United SC.

== Career ==
=== Youth ===
Wagner was identified by U.S. Soccer (U.S. National Team) when he was 13 through their national Olympic Development Program (ODP). He joined the U-14 National Team and was then recruited to their U-15 residency program at the IMG Academy in Bradenton, Florida, where he lived and trained. Through U.S. Soccer, he completed high school a year early at the Edison Academy. Wagner travelled globally with the team and was a starter with the U-17 National team when they played in the 2005 FIFA U-17 World Championship.

Wagner at first committed to playing college soccer at the University of Maryland, College Park, but instead chose to join the Generation Adidas program so that he could play professional soccer.

=== Professional ===
Wagner was drafted in the second round, 18th overall, of the 2006 MLS SuperDraft by FC Dallas. Wagner made his first appearance with FCD's first team on July 19, 2006, as a substitute in a 2-0 friendly match win against UANL Tigres. It would be his only appearance with the first team during his rookie season. In 2007, Blake made his MLS career debut on September 30, 2007, starting in a 0–3 loss against Houston Dynamo. He would make 12 appearances with the team during the 2007 MLS Season. The 2008 MLS Season was a breakout year for the third-year defender. Blake started in 23 of 24 games played and appeared in four of FC Dallas' six international friendlies.

On February 2, 2010 Vancouver Whitecaps announced the signing of Wagner after he did not re-sign with Dallas. He played his first match with the second division side on July 14, 2010, and played as a left wing midfielder and netted a hat trick in a 3–1 win over Miami FC.

After a successful 2011 preseason trial, Wagner signed with the Major League Soccer version of Vancouver Whitecaps FC on March 11, 2011. The Whitecaps released Wagner on July 28, 2011.

On August 16, 2011, Wagner was signed by Major League Soccer club Real Salt Lake. At season's end, the club declined his 2012 contract option and he entered the 2011 MLS Re-Entry Draft. Wagner was not selected in the draft and became a free agent.

Wagner signed with NASL club San Antonio Scorpions in March, 2012.

=== Managerial career ===
In 2017 he became an assistant coach with Tampa Bay's U23 team. Currently a staff coach with Tampa Bay United.
