= Toyota Field =

Stadium in San Antonio, Texas, USA

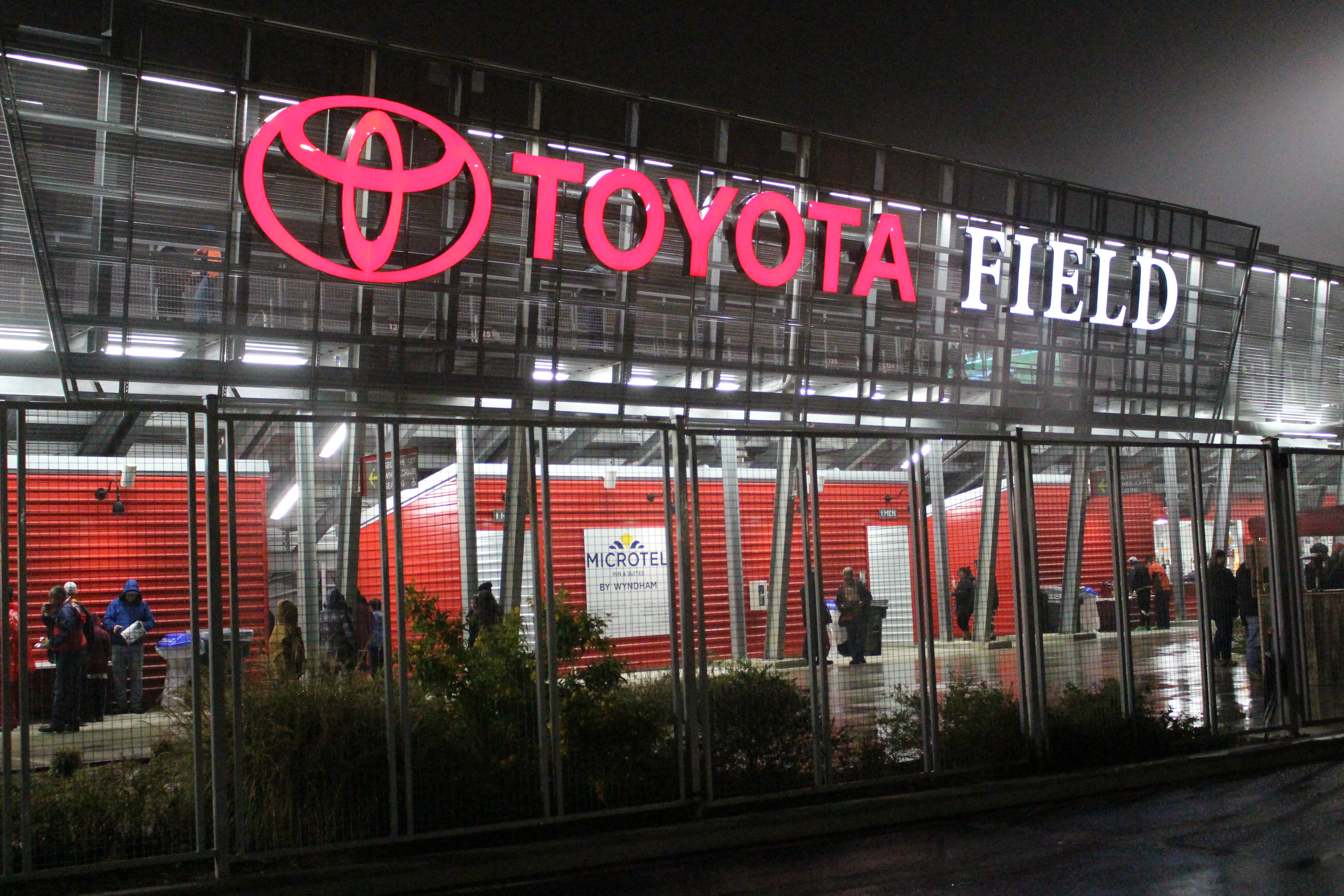
- Interactive map of Toyota Field
- Location: 5106 David Edwards Drive; San Antonio, TX 78233
- Coordinates: 29°32′20″N 98°23′41″W
- Owner: Bexar County; City of San Antonio
- Operator: Spurs Sports & Entertainment
- Capacity: 8,296
- Executive suites: 16
- Surface: TifSport Bermudagrass
- Record attendance: 9,191
- Field size: 115 x 70 yards

Construction
- Groundbreaking: February 2012
- Built: February 2012 – April 2013
- Opened: April 13, 2013
- Architect: Pro Sports Developments

Tenants
- San Antonio Scorpions (NASL) (2013–2015); San Antonio FC (USLC) (2016–present)

Website
- www.toyotafield.com

Toyota Field is a soccer-specific stadium in San Antonio, Texas, United States. Located next to Heroes Stadium, and adjacent to the STAR Soccer Complex and Morgan's Wonderland, the facility opened on April 13, 2013. The stadium is the home of San Antonio FC and has a capacity of 8,296 for soccer matches and 13,000 for concerts and festivals. The stadium was the home of the San Antonio Scorpions of the North American Soccer League until the team's dissolution following the 2015 season. The stadium is expandable up to 18,500 seating capacity in three phases and is currently built to its Phase 1 design. Toyota Motor Corporation currently holds the sponsor naming rights for the facility.

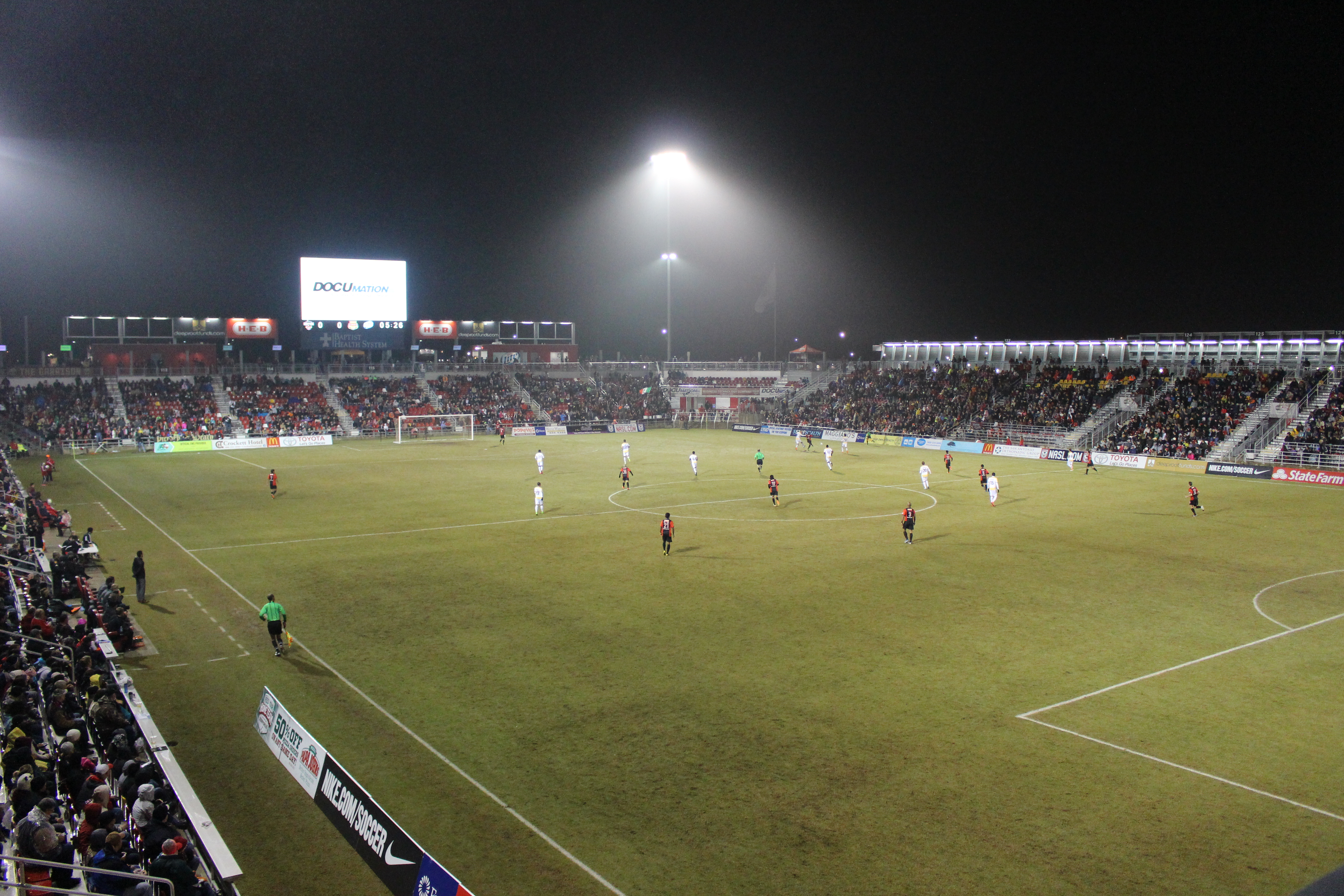
San Antonio Scorpions night game at Toyota Field

== History ==
Toyota Field was originally owned and operated by S.O.A.R. Inc., a non-profit organization founded by San Antonio philanthropist Gordon Hartman. During S.O.A.R. Inc.'s operation of the facility, all proceeds went to Morgan's Wonderland, which is across the street from the stadium. Hartman also started Soccer For A Cause, a community-wide effort to bring pro soccer to San Antonio in order to help fund the operation of Morgan’s Wonderland. This led to Hartman’s acquisition of the San Antonio Scorpions in 2010, with the team starting play in the 2012 season.

Construction of Toyota Field ran from February 2012 through April 2013. On April 13, 2013, the Scorpions started play at Toyota Field in a NASL match against the Tampa Bay Rowdies with a 0–2 defeat. The team had played at nearby Heroes Stadium during construction.

Toyota Field was host of Soccer Bowl 2014, where the Scorpions claimed their first and only NASL championship over the Fort Lauderdale Strikers, 2–1.

=== Acquisition by City and County ===
In November 2015, the City of San Antonio and Bexar County jointly acquired the stadium for $18 million. Spurs Sports & Entertainment (SS&E) paid an additional $3 million to Hartman, bringing the total purchase price of the facility to $21 million. SS&E received an initial 20-year lease to operate the facility with a new professional soccer team, with penalty fees of up to $5 million should the organization not bring a Major League Soccer franchise after the first six years. Toyota Field is host to San Antonio's USL franchise, San Antonio FC, who started play in March 2016.

== Design ==
Toyota Field was designed by San Antonio architecture firm, Pro Sports Developments (PSD), which is the sports entertainment division of Luna Architecture and Design. The stadium was designed as a soccer-specific stadium, to strategically expand to upwards of 18,000 seats in 3 total phases and to accommodate UIL, NCAA, MLS and FIFA standard international soccer events. The design also accommodates rugby, lacrosse, American football, boxing and concerts. The stadium currently exists as Phase 1 in the stadium expansion phases.

The stadium currently has a capacity of 8,296 seats, including 16 private suites, 864 midfield club seats, a field level beer garden for over 200 fans with tiered table and chair seating as close as 15 feet behind the south goal. A suite level observation terrace for over 100 fans overlooks the entire field, plus a fan zone behind the north-end seating allows fans to gather and get autographs before and after a game. The stadium capacity could reach approximately 9,000 spectators with standing-room only accommodations.

The architectural design by PSD reflects the industrial heritage of the historic Longhorn Quarry which the stadium now resides in. The stadium contains ribbed metal and perforated metal facades with exposed structural elements throughout the facility, accentuating the steel and creating a contemporary industrial feel. The metal façades and the metal roof canopy that extends over the west side suite balconies and stadium seating, together amplify the crowd noise. The permanent west side roof canopy combined with lower bowl stadium seating that starts only 17 feet from the soccer touchlines gives Toyota Field an intimate feel, a quality the designers say will continue with the future expansion phases as planned.

== Field ==
The soccer field playing surface was designed and built by sports field contractor Texas Multi-Chem, of Kerrville. The field's natural grass surface is TifSport hybrid Bermuda and the root zone consists of an 8" layer of USGA sand and Dakota peat. The field also contains an internal drainage system to help avoid rain outs.

== Sports ==
=== Soccer ===
The Scorpions played their first game at Toyota Field on April 13, 2013 against the Tampa Bay Rowdies, losing 2–0.

On May 21, 2013, Toyota Field hosted its first Lamar Hunt U.S. Open Cup match between the Scorpions versus FC Tucson of the PDL.

On July 6, 2013, Toyota Field hosted its first international friendly match between the Scorpions versus Tigres UANL of Liga MX.

On October 13, 2013, Toyota Field hosted Santos Laguna versus Club Tijuana, both of Liga MX, in a friendly match.

On December 6–7, 2013, Toyota Field hosted the NCAA Division III Men’s Soccer Championship and the NCAA Division III Women's Soccer Championship.

On March 26, 2023, Toyota Field hosted CF Monterrey vs Atlas FC, both of Liga MX, in a friendly match. Monterrey won the match 2-0.

On July 15, 2023, Toyota Field hosted an international friendly match between San Antonio FC and Sunderland AFC, of EFL Championship. Sunderland defeated San Antonio 3-1.

On September 12, 2023, Toyota Field hosted an international friendly match between San Antonio FC and C.D. Tapatío of Liga de Expansión MX. Tapatío defeated San Antonio 4-1.

On January 20, 2024, Toyota Field hosted an international friendly match between the United States and Slovenia. Slovenia won 1–0.

Toyota Field hosted the final match of the 2024 NWSL x Liga MX Femenil Summer Cup on October 25, 2024. Kansas City Current defeated NJ/NY Gotham FC 2–0.

On May 31, 2025, Toyota Field hosted an international friendly match between San Antonio FC and UD Las Palmas, who had recently been relegated from La Liga to the Segunda División. UD Las Palmas defeated San Antonio 1-0.

On June 9, 2026, Toyota Field hosted an international friendly match between the Saudi Arabia and Senegal men's national teams as part of their preparations for the 2026 FIFA World Cup. The match ended in 0–0.

=== Rugby union ===
On March 30, 2019, Toyota Field hosted the Austin Elite and Rugby United New York of Major League Rugby. Rugby United New York would win 19-11 in front of 1,000 fans.

== See also ==
- List of sports venues with the name Toyota
