= Hans Denissen =

Dutch footballer

Personal information
- Date of birth: 9 March 1984 (age 42)
- Place of birth: Tilburg, Netherlands
- Height: 5 ft 10 in (1.78 m)
- Position: Forward

Youth career
- 1990–1993: SvSSS
- 1993–2003: Willem II

Senior career*
Years	Team	Apps	(Gls)
2003–2006	Willem II	26	(4)
2006–2007	RBC	18	(4)
2007–2008	MVV	16	(0)
2008–2009	Ayia Napa	20	(3)
2009	Haka	5	(0)
2009–2011	Emmen	63	(17)
2011–2012	Willem II	1	(0)
2012–2013	San Antonio Scorpions	46	(16)
2014	New York Cosmos	11	(0)
2015	Atlanta Silverbacks	11	(1)
2016–2019	Milwaukee Wave (indoor)	60	(16)
Total		277	(61)

International career
2005	Netherlands U21	2	(0)

Managerial career
- 2018–2020: Milwaukee Wave (assistant)
- * Club domestic league appearances and goals

Hans Denissen (born 9 March 1984) is a Dutch former professional footballer. He ended his career in 2019, playing indoor soccer for Major Arena Soccer League side Milwaukee Wave.

== Club career ==
=== Europe ===
Denissen grew up in Udenhout and started his career with local amateur side SvSSS. There, he was discovered by hometown club, Willem II. After going through their youth department, he was promoted to the first team squad in the summer of 2003.

After his first three years, he signed with RBC Roosendaal. The following season, he joined MVV, and it looked like he would spend his career in the second division of Dutch league football. Surprisingly, he transferred to Cypriot side Ayia Napa FC in the summer of 2008. The following season, he moved to Finland and joined FC Haka. After only a few months, he found his way back to his home country and to the second division, as he joined FC Emmen.

In the summer of 2011 he rejoined former team Willem II on an amateur contract to play in the second team.

=== United States ===
Denissen signed with San Antonio Scorpions FC of the North American Soccer League on 9 January 2012. During the 2013 regular season, he made 25 appearances and was named to the NASL Best XI.

The New York Cosmos signed Denissen on 2 January 2014. Denissen made his Cosmos' debut on 28 May 2014, coming on as a second-half substitute in the team's 2–0 win over the Brooklyn Italians in the U.S. Open Cup. Denissen appeared in his first NASL game for the Cosmos on 8 June 2014, coming in as a substitute in the 74th minute of the team's 1–0 win over Ottawa Fury FC. He returned to San Antonio to face his former club for the first time on 1 November 2014, coming on as a substitute in the 68th minute of the team's 1–0 road loss. Just one week later, he came on as a substitute again in extra time of the team's 2–1 semifinal loss in San Antonio against a Scorpions side that would go on to win The Championship. Denissen made five starts in 11 regular season appearances for the Cosmos in 2014 and was tied for second on the team with three assists.

After his release from New York Cosmos, Denissen signed with Atlanta Silverbacks in February 2015.

Denissen retired in 2019, playing indoor soccer for Major Arena Soccer League side Milwaukee Wave. He continued in a role as assistant coach of the team.

== International ==
In 2005, he was a substitute in an official friendly match for the Netherlands national under-21 football team, he played twice for the team.
