= Pablo Campos (Brazilian footballer) =

Brazilian footballer (born 1983)

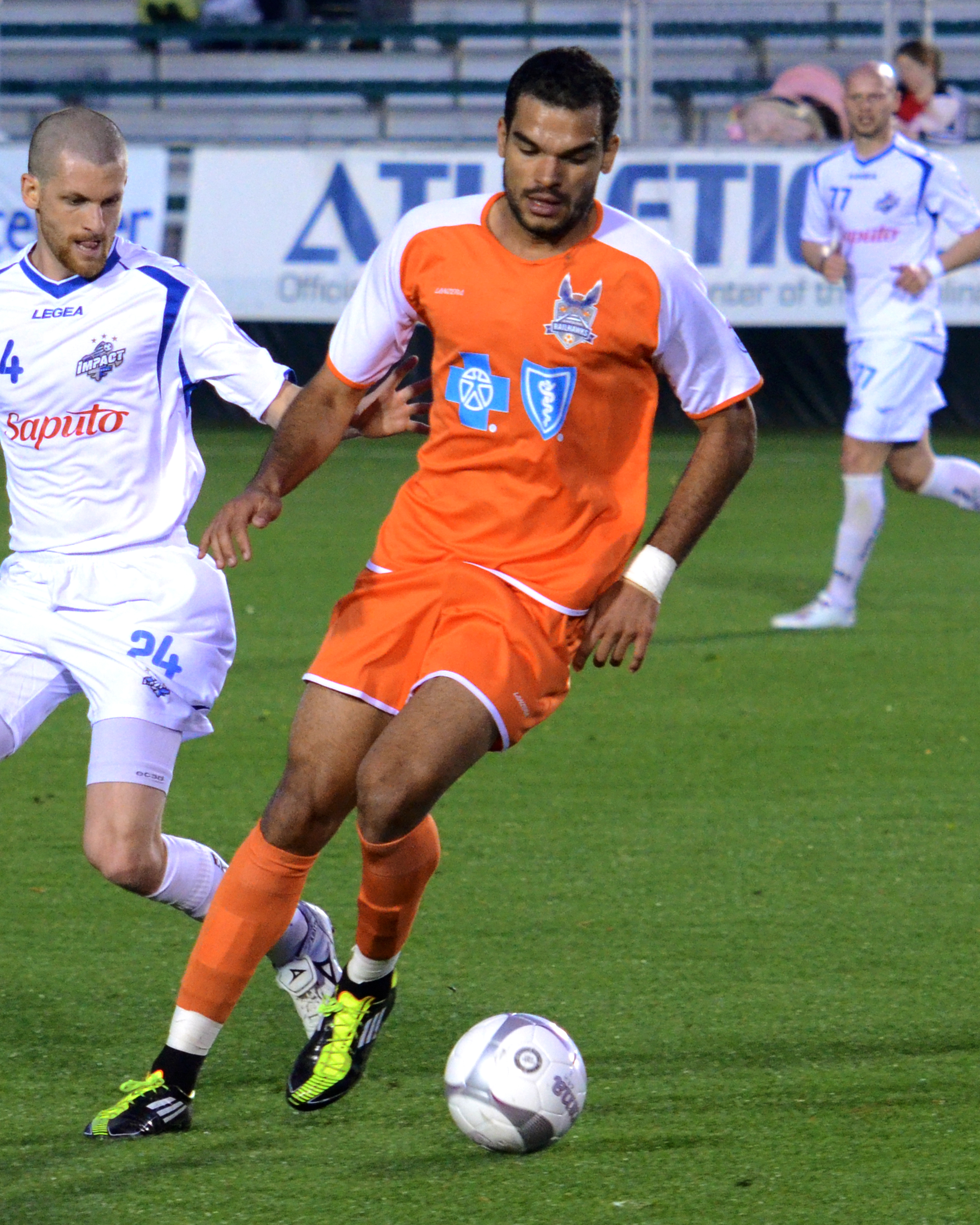

Personal information
- Date of birth: January 29, 1983 (age 43)
- Place of birth: São Paulo, Brazil
- Height: 6 ft 3 in (1.91 m)
- Position: Forward

Youth career
- 1997–2000: Guarani
- 2000–2002: Botafogo
- 2005–2006: Oklahoma Baptist Bison
- 2007–2008: Fresno Pacific Sunbirds

Senior career*
Years	Team	Apps	(Gls)
2007–2008	Fresno Fuego	25	(32)
2008–2009	GAIS	8	(0)
2009	San Jose Earthquakes	14	(2)
2009–2010	Real Salt Lake	27	(2)
2011	Carolina RailHawks	26	(12)
2012	San Antonio Scorpions	28	(20)
2013–2015	Minnesota United	53	(20)
2016	Miami FC	15	(1)
2022-2023	Vlora FC	6	(5)
- * Club domestic league appearances and goals

Pablo Campos (born January 29, 1983) is a Brazilian former footballer.

== Career ==
=== College and amateur ===
Campos began his amateur career at Fresno Pacific University, and was named to the 2007 NSCAA/adidas NAIA Men's All-America Team, before going on to excel with the Fresno Fuego of the USL Premier Development League.

In his first year with Fresno in 2007, he scored 18 goals in 15 appearances, ending the year as the top scorer in the entire PDL, and PDL MVP. After being courted by several Major League Soccer teams in the 2007–08 offseason, notably Real Salt Lake, Campos decided to forego a professional career in the US, where his salary as a developmental player would have been small, and instead chose to continue his college studies and play for Fresno Fuego for one more season; he subsequently scored 14 goals in 10 games for the Fresno Fuego in the PDL in 2008.

=== Professional ===
Campos signed with GAIS in July 2008. He made his debut for in an Allsvenskan game against Gefle, on September 24 and made his first professional start two weeks later, against Norrköping.

In February 2009, Campos joined the San Jose Earthquakes after the team won a weighted Major League Soccer lottery for his services. He scored his first professional goal on April 18, 2009, in a 1–1 tie with Los Angeles Galaxy.

Campos was later traded to Real Salt Lake in July 2009. Campos scored his first goal for Salt Lake on August 26 in a home match against Chivas USA at Rio Tinto Stadium. The strike turned out to be the winning goal in a 4–0 RSL triumph. A few days later, he scored the lone goal in Real Salt Lake's 1–0 victory against the Kansas City Wizards – the club's first-ever win in Kansas City. Campos and Real Salt Lake won the MLS Cup in 2009 after a great season. Campos played sparingly for RSL in 2010 and was released by the club ahead of the 2011 season.

He signed with Carolina RailHawks of the North American Soccer League in April 2011. After one season with Carolina, Campos signed with NASL expansion side. San Antonio Scorpions in February 2012. This year he won several awards which include Golden Boot (most goals) and Golden Ball (MVP). In 2013, Pablo joined the relaunched Minnesota Franchise now known as Minnesota United where he continued his success in front of goal. He became the all-time modern NASL leading scorer on June 3, 2015.

Campos joined NASL expansion team Miami FC ahead of the 2016 season.

== Personal ==
On April 30, 2015, Campos announced that he had become an American citizen.

== Honors ==
=== Real Salt Lake ===
- Major League Soccer MLS Cup: 2009
- Major League Soccer Eastern Conference Championship: 2009
