= Greg Janicki =

American soccer player

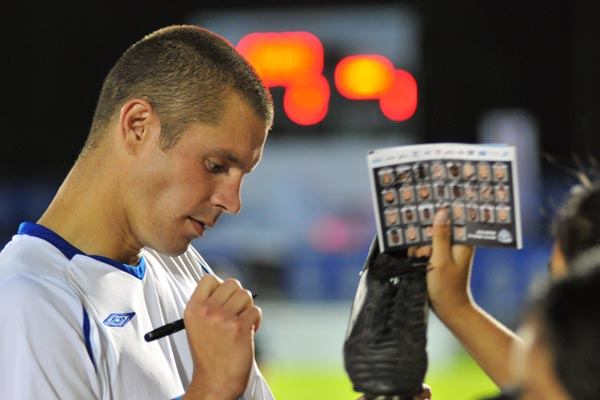

Personal information
- Full name: Gregory Janicki
- Date of birth: July 9, 1984 (age 42)
- Place of birth: Rochester, Michigan, United States
- Height: 6 ft 3 in (1.91 m)
- Position: Defender

Youth career
- 2003–2006: Michigan State Spartans

Senior career*
Years	Team	Apps	(Gls)
2006	Michigan Bucks	5	(0)
2007	West Michigan Edge	15	(1)
2008	Pittsburgh Riverhounds	14	(0)
2008–2009	D.C. United	10	(0)
2010	Vancouver Whitecaps	26	(4)
2011	Vancouver Whitecaps FC	10	(0)
2012–2014	San Antonio Scorpions	68	(4)
2015–2016	Indy Eleven	43	(4)
2017	Detroit City FC	1	(0)
- * Club domestic league appearances and goals as of March 27, 2018

Gregory Janicki (born July 9, 1984) is an American former professional soccer player who last played for Detroit City FC in the NPSL.

== Career ==
=== Youth and college ===
Born in Rochester, Michigan, Janicki attended Anchor Bay High School, where he recorded a school soccer record of 74 goals and 32 assists in three seasons. As a senior, he placed third in the voting for Michigan's Mr. Soccer Award.

Janicki played college soccer for Michigan State University, playing 61 matches over four seasons. During his senior year, Janicki played in eighteen games, tallying two goals and an assist, and was named as a second-team member of the NSCAA/adidas All-Great Lakes Region team, and to the All-Big Ten First Team. During his college years, Janicki also played in the USL Premier Development League for both Michigan Bucks and West Michigan Edge.

=== Professional ===
Janicki signed his first professional contract in 2008, playing in the USL Second Division for Pittsburgh Riverhounds. Janicki appeared in 14 games for the Hounds, registering one assist. Following the conclusion of the 2008 USL-2 season, Janicki was loaned to D.C. United of Major League Soccer for the remainder of the year and signed to a developmental contract with D.C. United. He made his debut for the team on October 1, 2008, in a group stage match of the CONCACAF Champions League 2008–09 game against Mexican side Cruz Azul. He appeared in three league games and five Champions League matches in 2008, after which he was signed to a senior contract.

Janicki was waived by D.C. United at the end of the 2009 MLS season.

On December 23, 2009, Janicki signed a one-year contract with Vancouver Whitecaps of the USSF Division 2 Professional League.

On December 10, 2010, it was announced that Janicki would remain with Vancouver Whitecaps FC as the club made the jump to MLS. He stayed with Vancouver for the 2011 MLS season but the club declined his contract option for 2012. Janicki entered the 2011 MLS Re-Entry Draft and became a free agent after he was not selected.

On December 14, 2011, it was announced that Janicki signed with the expansion San Antonio Scorpions of the North American Soccer League for the 2012 season.

On January 9, 2015, Janicki signed with NASL club Indy Eleven.

On December 9, 2016, Janicki announced his retirement from soccer.
