= Walter Ramírez =

Honduran footballer (born 1983)

Personal information
- Full name: Walter Isidro Ramírez
- Date of birth: November 7, 1983 (age 42)
- Place of birth: La Ceiba, Honduras
- Height: 1.75 m (5 ft 9 in)
- Position: Midfielder

Team information
- Current team: Miami United FC

Youth career
- Honduras Five Star

Senior career*
Years	Team	Apps	(Gls)
- Real Honduras
2006–2009	Miami FC	76	(1)
2010–2011	Vida		
2012–2013	San Antonio Scorpions	51	(2)
2014	Indy Eleven	7	(0)
2014–2015	Fort Lauderdale Strikers	30	(7)
2016	Tampa Bay Rowdies	13	(0)
2016	→ Tampa Bay Rowdies 2 (loan)	1	(0)
2017	Puerto Rico FC	29	(1)
2018	Penn FC	13	(1)
2021–	Miami United FC	2	(0)
- * Club domestic league appearances and goals as of 21 September 2021

Walter Isidro Ramírez (born November 7, 1983) is a Honduran footballer who plays for Miami United FC in the National Premier Soccer League.

== Career ==
After playing with the amateur teams Real Honduras and Honduras Five Star (Honduras Cinco Estrellas) in the prestigious Florida-based Copa Latina, Ramírez signed with Miami FC of the USL First Division prior to their first season in competition in 2006. He has since gone on to be a mainstay in Miami's defensive line, playing in over 50 games for the team.

Nicknamed Black, Ramírez signed a contract with Vida of Liga Nacional de Honduras in Summer 2010.

Ramírez returned to the United States when he signed with the expansion San Antonio Scorpions of the North American Soccer League on December 21, 2011.

On January 30, 2014, Ramírez signed with the expansion Indy Eleven of the North American Soccer League On July 8, 2014, Ramírez was released by Indy Eleven.

In August 2014 Ramírez signed with Fort Lauderdale Strikers of NASL. He remained with the club through the end of 2015 before signing with Tampa Bay Rowdies on 24 December 2015.
