= San Antonio Scorpions =

American association football team (2010–2015)

- Full name: San Antonio Scorpions Football Club
- Nickname: Scorpions
- Founded: October 4, 2010; 16 years ago
- Dissolved: December 22, 2015; 10 years ago
- Stadium: Toyota Field; San Antonio, Texas
- Capacity: 8,296
- Owner: Gordon Hartman
- League: North American Soccer League
- 2015: Spring: 7th Fall: 10th Combined: 10th Playoffs: Did not qualify
Home colors	Away colors	Third colors

The San Antonio Scorpions were an American professional soccer team based in San Antonio, Texas. Founded in 2010, the team made its debut in the North American Soccer League in 2012. The Scorpions played at Toyota Field, a soccer specific stadium that was completed in 2013.

The club operated differently from most professional sports clubs in terms of its operating profit. As part of owner Gordon Hartman's Soccer for a Cause, all net profits from Scorpions operations went towards funding Morgan's Wonderland, a wheelchair accessible theme park located in the Longhorn Quarry, next to STAR Soccer Complex and Toyota Field.

On December 22, 2015, it was announced that Toyota Field and S.T.A.R. Soccer Complex were sold to the City of San Antonio and Bexar County, a deal which was accompanied by an agreement for Spurs Sports and Entertainment to operate the facilities and field San Antonio FC, which plays in the USL.

== History ==
=== NASL expansion ===
On October 4, 2010, the NASL announced that a San Antonio expansion team would join the new league in 2012. The team's ownership group was led by San Antonio businessman and philanthropist Gordon Hartman. The official name of the team was revealed at a press conference on January 10, 2011: San Antonio Scorpions FC.

In the team's first NASL game, the Scorpions tied the Atlanta Silverbacks 0–0. Despite Heroes Stadium's listed capacity of 11,000, the Scorpions drew 13,151 to their home opener against the Puerto Rico Islanders on April 15, 2012. The Scorpions lost the game 4–0.

The Scorpions scored their first goal the following weekend in a 2–2 tie with the Fort Lauderdale Strikers, with Pablo Campos netting the first goal in the 41st minute. Hans Denissen scored in stoppage time to give San Antonio its first ever home points.

The Scorpions sold 3,040 season tickets for the 2013 season. After a promising spring season in which the team finished 3rd, the fall season told another story. On August 27, 2013, Tim Hankinson was fired as Head Coach after an 0–0–4 start in the NASL fall season. Assistant Coach Alen Marcina was named to replace him on an interim basis. Marcina was named permanent head coach on November 20, 2013. The Scorpions would finish last in the fall season standings and finish in 7th place in the combined table at the end of the 2013 season.

=== NASL Soccer Bowl champions (2014) ===
The 2014 season, Marcina's first full season at the helm, was a complete turnaround for the Scorpions from the previous year. After finishing third in the spring season standings, the Scorpions captured the fall season championship on a stoppage-time goal from captain Adrian Cann in a 1–0 win over the visiting New York Cosmos. The Scorpions would face the Cosmos again just a week later in their NASL Championship semi-final game at Toyota Field. The Scorpions would go on to win that game in extra-time, 2–1, as Wálter Restrepo scored the winning goal in the 110th minute.

On November 15, 2014, the Scorpions hosted the 2014 Soccer Bowl at Toyota Field against the Fort Lauderdale Strikers in front of a modern-era NASL Championship game record attendance of 7,847 fans. The Scorpions would go on to win their first NASL title beating the Strikers 2–1 in the Soccer Bowl. Rafael Castillo was named the Man of the Match after he opened up the scoring with a bicycle kick that garnered national attention.

== Stadium ==
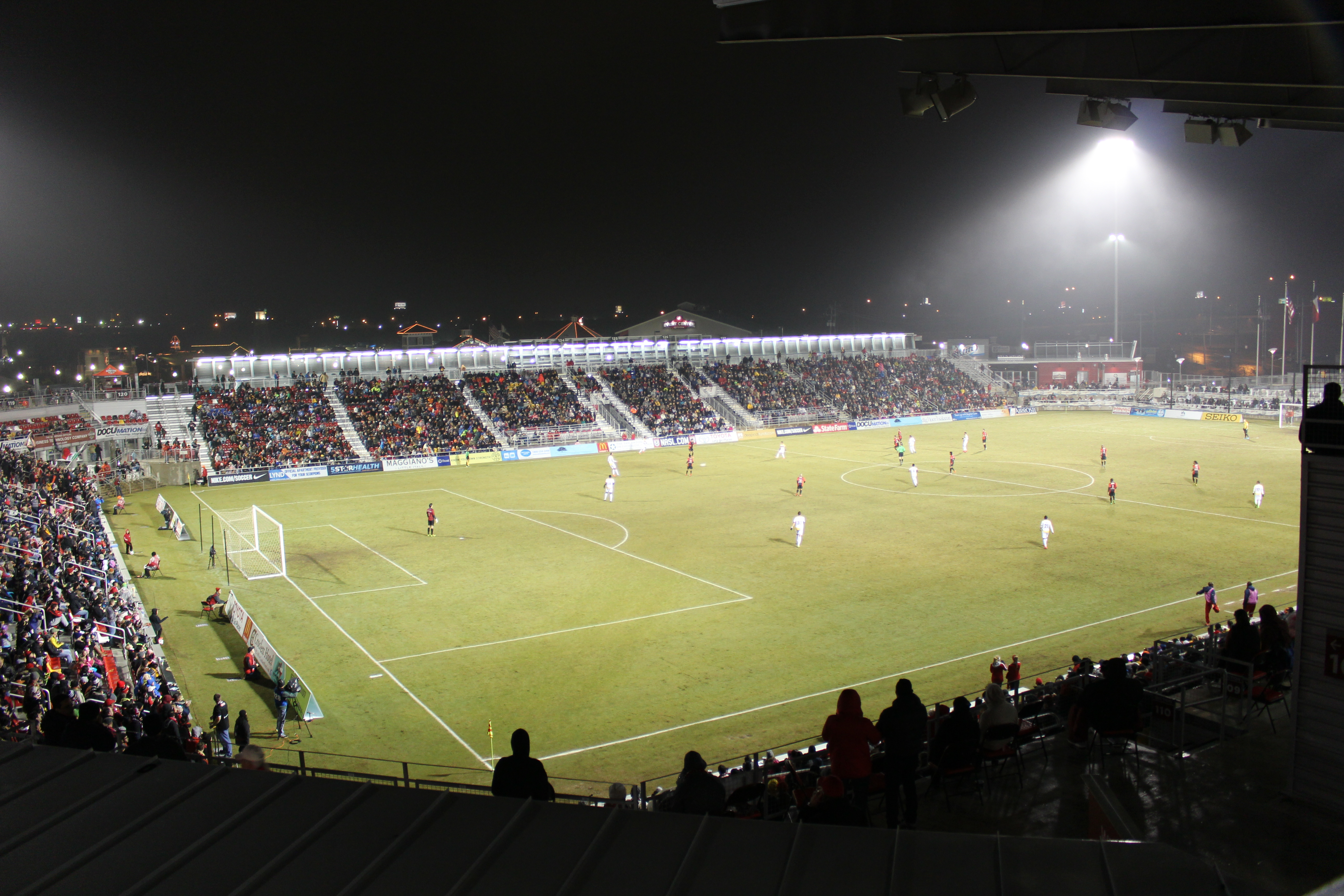
Toyota Field during Soccer Bowl 2014

- Heroes Stadium (2012), capacity 11,000
- Comalander Stadium (2012 U.S. Open Cup Round 2 vs Laredo Heat), capacity 11,000
- Toyota Field (2013–2015), capacity 8,000

While the club waited for Toyota Field to be constructed, the Scorpions used Heroes Stadium in San Antonio as their home for the 2012 season.

The Scorpions used Comalander Stadium as an alternate playing site for their 2012 U.S. Open Cup matchup against the Laredo Heat. Comalander Stadium is owned by North East ISD, the same owner of Heroes Stadium.

In 2013, the team debuted in Toyota Field, built across the street from the STAR Soccer Complex. Construction on Toyota Field began in February 2012 and was opened in April 2013. Toyota Field seats 8,000 fans, with the possibility of expanding the complex up to 18,000 as demand necessitates.

On November 15, 2014, Toyota Field hosted the NASL Soccer Bowl between the San Antonio Scorpions and the Fort Lauderdale Strikers. The Scorpions won 2–1.

== Club culture ==
=== Supporters ===
The Scorpions had three supporters groups:

- The largest organized supporters group was the Crocketteers. This group was in existence for 18 months prior to the team's announcement, and was instrumental in helping consolidate the San Antonio soccer fanbase behind the new team. The group currently has over 1,500 registered members.
- The Casual Football Firm (C.F.F.) began in 2011 with the announcement of the new NASL team, the San Antonio Scorpions. Upon their inception they were known as the Bexar County Casuals. As their chapters grew to other cities, they have since come under one umbrella. The C.F.F. are known for their high energetic chants and hardcore footie style. C.F.F can be found standing for 90 minutes for their club chanting mostly original songs of pride.
- El Veneno was "San Antonio's first Spanish-speaking supporters group". Their chants were in Spanish.

=== Mascot ===
Sting is unveiled to fans and supporters

On April 12, 2014, San Antonio unveiled its new mascot at a home match against Minnesota United. During halftime, the new mascot was introduced to fans and supporters. The club held a naming contest with the fans on social media and after an online vote, Sting was the name given to the new mascot. Sting attended all home games at Toyota Field and could be seen alongside the team at marketing and community outreach programs.

=== Rivalries ===
The Scorpions played MLS side FC Dallas in the deeproot Funds Cup, an annual rivalry game between the two clubs. The team also played in the Hill Country Derby versus the USL's Austin Aztex. This game gave "Central Texas bragging rights" to the winner.

== Broadcasting ==
For the 2015 season, "all 15 regular season home matches will air live on ESPN3 in the U.S., ESPN Play in Latin America, and ESPN Player in Europe, the Middle East and Africa." In total reached 75 countries. All home games were also broadcast locally on KSAT-TV Channel 12.

== Major League Soccer expansion ==
The Scorpions had declared their interest in moving to Major League Soccer. Toyota Field is expandable to MLS standards of 18,000 seats, although the stadium's location 20 minutes northeast of downtown does not meet MLS's preference for downtown stadiums. Owner Gordon Hartmann had preliminary discussions with MLS CEO Don Garber in spring 2014. The Crocketeers supporters group have collected over 5,000 signatures in a petition to join MLS. As of January 2015, San Antonio is still in discussions with MLS and "has been very active" according to Commissioner Garber. On February 26, 2015, the San Antonio City Council, Scorpions owner Gordon Hartman, and MLS Commissioner Don Garber all received a letter from the president of the Mexican Football Federation, Justino Compeán, stating he and the Federation support Gordon Hartman on his bid to bring MLS to San Antonio. Compeán wrote that "The city has the infrastructure, resources and diversity that makes San Antonio the ideal place for MLS expansion...I am very pleased that these local leaders have initiated the effort to bring professional soccer to San Antonio and I look forward to having them as my partner.”

== Year-by-year ==
All-time San Antonio Scorpions coaching stats
Coach	Nationality	Start	End	Games	Win	Draw	Loss	Win %	Honors
Tim Hankinson	United States	September 14, 2011	August 27, 2013	50	21	11	18	42.00	2012 North American Supporters' Trophy
Alen Marcina (interim)	Canada	August 27, 2013	November 20, 2013	10	3	1	6	30.00	
Alen Marcina	Canada	November 20, 2013	November 1, 2015	62	26	14	22	41.94	2014 Fall Champions; 2014 NASL Champions

Year	Division	League	Spring season	Fall season	Combined table (North American Supporters' Trophy)	Playoffs	U.S. Open Cup	Top Scorer		Avg. attendance (regular season)	Avg. attendance (playoffs)
Year	Division	League	Spring season	Fall season	Combined table (North American Supporters' Trophy)	Playoffs	U.S. Open Cup	Player	Goals (regular season)	Avg. attendance (regular season)	Avg. attendance (playoffs)
2012	2	NASL	^{#}	^{#}	1st	Semi-Finals	Fourth round	(Brazil) Pablo Campos	20	9,176	6,249
2013	2	NASL	3rd	8th	7th	did not qualify	Second Round	(Netherlands) Hans Denissen	12	6,937	did not qualify
2014	2	NASL	3rd	1st	2nd	Champions	Fourth round	(Colombia) Rafael Castillo	7	6,810	7,198
2015	2	NASL	7th	10th	10th	did not qualify	Third Round	(Jamaica) Omar Cummings	10	6,736	did not qualify

# Spring & Fall Championships not instituted until 2013 season

=== Record vs. NASL clubs ===
As of November 1, 2015

Regular season record
Team	W	D	L	Total
Atlanta Silverbacks	7	4	3	14
Carolina Railhawks	8	1	5	14
FC Edmonton	6	4	4	14
Fort Lauderdale Strikers	4	6	4	14
Indy Eleven	4	0	2	6
Jacksonville Armada	1	1	1	3
Minnesota United	3	6	5	14
New York Cosmos	3	0	5	8
Ottawa Fury	1	3	2	6
Tampa Bay Rowdies	7	0	7	14
Puerto Rico Islanders^{$}	1	0	3	4

$ Dissolved after the 2012 season

=== Record vs. MLS clubs ===
Competition	P	W	D	L	Win %
Lamar Hunt U.S. Open Cup	2	1	0	1	50.00
Deeproot Funds Cup	2	1	1	0	50.00
Friendlies	1	1	0	0	100.00

Date	Competition	Home team	Result	Away team	Location
May 29, 2012	2012 Lamar Hunt U.S. Open Cup	San Antonio Scorpions	1–0	Houston Dynamo	San Antonio, Texas
March 1, 2014	Deeproot Funds Cup	San Antonio Scorpions	1–1	FC Dallas	San Antonio, Texas
March 20, 2014	Friendly	Houston Dynamo	0–2	San Antonio Scorpions	Houston, Texas
June 17, 2014	2014 Lamar Hunt U.S. Open Cup	FC Dallas	2–0	San Antonio Scorpions	Frisco, Texas
February 28, 2015	Deeproot Funds Cup	San Antonio Scorpions	2–1	FC Dallas	San Antonio, Texas

=== Record vs. international clubs ===
Competition	P	W	D	L	Win %
Friendlies	9	2	3	4	22.22

Date	Competition	Home team	Result	Away team	Location
March 14, 2012	Friendly	San Antonio Scorpions	3–0	(Mexico) Dorados de Sinaloa	Stockton, California
July 6, 2013	Friendly	San Antonio Scorpions	1–5	(Mexico) Tigres UANL	San Antonio, Texas
July 20, 2013	Friendly	San Antonio Scorpions	1–2	(Mexico) Dorados de Sinaloa	San Antonio, Texas
April 5, 2014	Friendly	San Antonio Scorpions	1–1	(Costa Rica) Deportivo Saprissa	San Antonio, Texas
June 21, 2014	Friendly	San Antonio Scorpions	1–2	(Mexico) Tigres UANL	San Antonio, Texas
June 28, 2014	Friendly	San Antonio Scorpions	3–3	Mexico U-21	San Antonio, Texas
July 6, 2014	Friendly	San Antonio Scorpions	1–1	(Mexico) C.F. Monterrey	San Antonio, Texas
March 28, 2015	Friendly	San Antonio Scorpions	4–2	Costa Rica U-23	San Antonio, Texas
June 27, 2015	Friendly	San Antonio Scorpions	0–1	(Costa Rica) C.S. Cartaginés	San Antonio, Texas

== Honors ==
=== League ===
- North American Soccer League
  - Champions: 2014
  - Spring Champions:
  - Fall Champions: 2014
- North American Supporters' Trophy
  - Winners: 2012
  - Runners-up: 2014

=== Minor ===
- Deeproot Funds Cup: 2014^{*}, 2015
- Hill Country Derby:

* denotes co-champions

=== Player honors ===
Year	Pos	Player	Honor
2012	FW	Pablo Campos	Golden Ball Award; Golden Boot Award; NASL Best XI
2012	DF	Ryan Cochrane	NASL Best XI
2012	MF	Walter Ramirez	NASL Best XI
2012	GK	Daryl Sattler	Golden Glove Award
2013	FW	Hans Denissen	NASL Best XI
2014	MF	Rafael Castillo	NASL Best XI
2014	MF	Walter Restrepo	NASL Best XI

== Records ==
=== Player records ===
Statistics are for NASL regular season and post season only.

==== All-time leaders ====
Goals
Rank	Player	Goals	Career
1	Pablo Campos	21	2012
2	Rafael Castillo	17	2014–2015
3	Hans Denissen	16	2012–2013
4	Tomasz Zahorski	15	2013–2014
5	Omar Cummings	10	2015
5	Billy Forbes	10	2014–2015

Games Played
Rank	Player	Games	Career
1	Stephen DeRoux	74	2013–2015
2	Greg Janicki	68	2012–2014
3	Walter Ramírez	51	2012–2013
4	Billy Forbes	50	2014–2015
5	Hans Denissen	48	2012–2013

Minutes Played
Rank	Player	Minutes	Career
1	Stephen DeRoux	6,234	2013–2015
2	Greg Janicki	5,973	2012–2014
3	Rafael Castillo	4,056	2014–2015
4	Billy Forbes	3,842	2014–2015
5	Walter Ramírez	3,791	2012–2013

Shutouts
Rank	Player	Shutouts	Career
1	Daryl Sattler	15	2012, 2014–2015
2	Josh Saunders	7	2014
3	David Bingham	5	2014
4	Daniel Fernandes	4	2015
4	Jeremy Vuolo	4	2013–2014

As of January 4, 2016

==== Hat tricks ====
Player	Date	Opponent
Pablo Campos^{4}	July 28, 2012	Carolina Railhawks

^{4} Player scored 4 goals.

==== Records ====
- Most goals in a regular season: 20 | (Brazil) Pablo Campos (2012)
- Most assists in a regular season: 8 | (Turks and Caicos Islands) Billy Forbes (2015)
- Most consecutive appearances: 42 | (Turks and Caicos Islands) Billy Forbes (May 31, 2014 – September 5, 2015)

=== Team records ===
The following records are for NASL regular season only. As of September 9, 2015

==== Attendance ====
- Highest NASL attendance: 13,151 on April 15, 2012 (0–4 vs Puerto Rico Islanders), Heroes Stadium
  - Record NASL attendance at Toyota Field is 8,313 on September 20, 2014 (0–2 vs Minnesota United)
- Lowest NASL attendance: 4,192 on September 9, 2015 (3–3 vs Carolina Railhawks), Toyota Field
- Highest U.S. Open Cup attendance: 7,164 on May 29, 2012 (1–0 vs Houston Dynamo), Heroes Stadium
- Lowest U.S. Open Cup attendance: 3,411 on May 28, 2014 (4–2 vs NTX Rayados), Toyota Field

==== Matches ====
- Biggest win: 8–0 vs Carolina Railhawks, July 28, 2012
- Biggest loss: 0–4 vs Puerto Rico Islanders, April 15, 2012 | 0–4 vs FC Edmonton, July 5, 2015
- Highest scoring match: 4–7 loss vs Tampa Bay Rowdies, August 3, 2013

==== Seasons ====
- Most wins in a NASL season: 16 in 27 matches, 2014
- Most losses in a NASL season: 14 in 26 matches, 2013
- Most points in a NASL season: 52 in 27 matches, 2014
- Fewest points in a NASL season: 30 in 26 matches, 2013
- Most goals scored in a NASL season: 46 in 28 matches, 2012
- Fewest goals scored in a NASL season: 34 in 26 matches, 2013

==== Streaks ====
- Longest winning streak: 5 games, June 1 – July 4, 2013
- Longest unbeaten streak: 9 games, April 21 – June 16, 2012 | May 10 – July 26, 2014
- Longest losing streak: 5 games, August 3 – 31, 2013
- Longest winless streak: 7 games, August 3 – September 14, 2013

== See also ==
- San Antonio Thunder of the North American Soccer League (1968–84)
