= Morgan's Wonderland =

Non-profit theme park in Texas

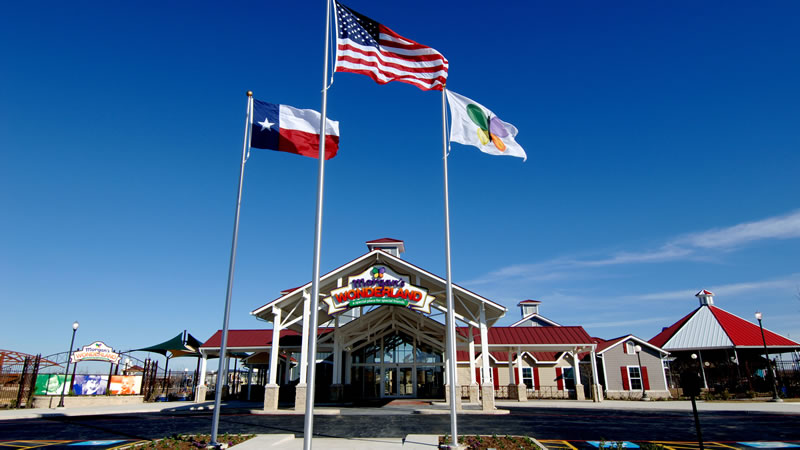
- Entrance of Morgan's Wonderland
- Interactive map of Morgan's Wonderland
- Location: San Antonio, Texas, United States
- Coordinates: 29.539°N 98.392°W
- Status: Operating
- Opened: March 3, 2010; 16 years ago
- Slogan: Where everyone comes to play!
- Operating season: March - November
- Area: 25 acres (0.10 km^{2})
- Website: morganswonderland.com

Morgan's Wonderland is a theme park in San Antonio, Texas. It has had over a net million guests since its opening in 2010. The park features several attractions including rides, playgrounds, gardens, a catch-and-release fishing lake, a special-event center, and 575-seat amphitheater. The park's focus on accessibility makes it free for disabled individuals to attend the park.

== History ==
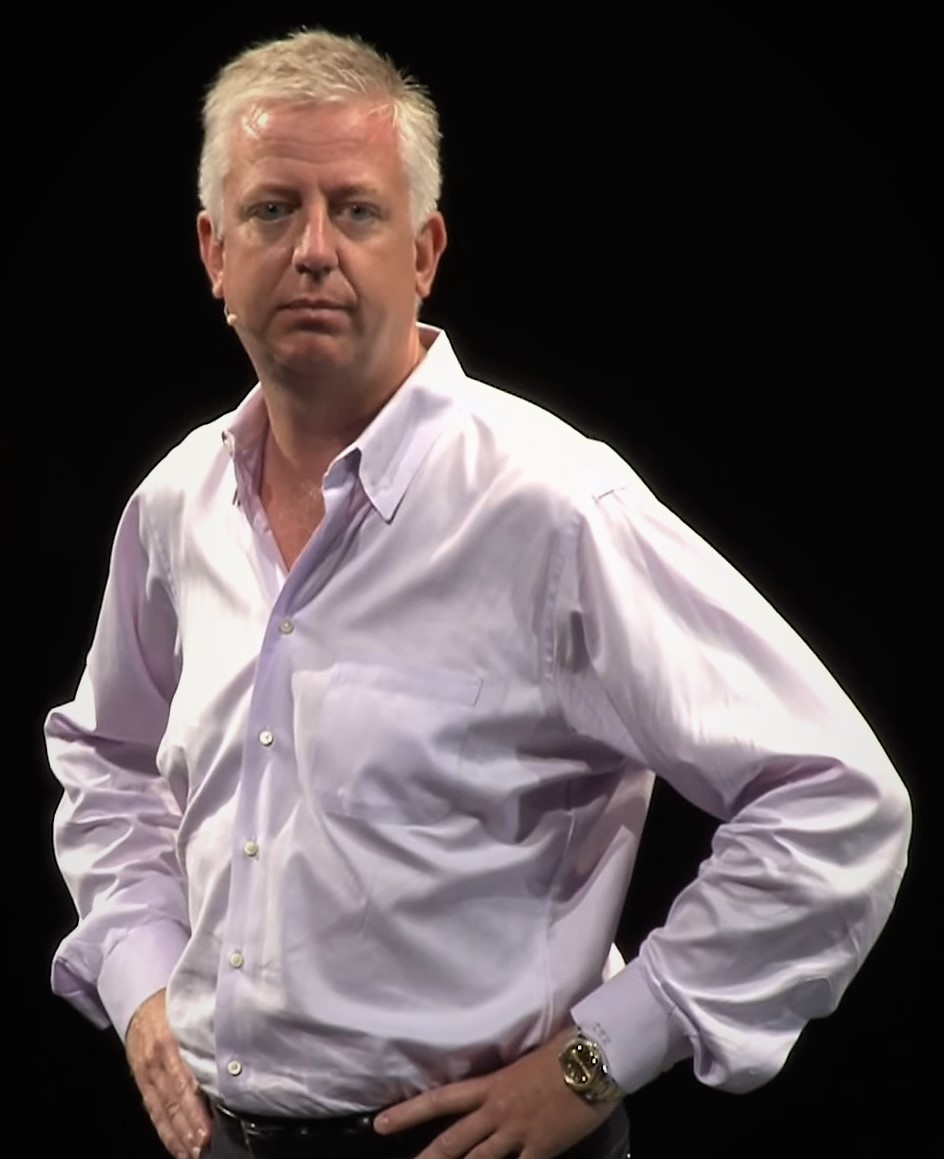
Gordon Hartman speaks at TEDx San Antonio in 2021

In 2005, Hartman sold his homebuilding business to establish The Gordon Hartman Family Foundation in order to aid children and adults with disabilities along with his wife, Maggie. During a family vacation, their disabled daughter Morgan wanted to play with kids tossing a ball in a hotel swimming pool, but when she approached them, they abruptly took their ball and vanished. "I'll never forget the look of anguish and dismay on Morgan's face, so I decided there had to be a way to bridge the gap of misunderstanding about people with special needs. That incident was the tipping point for Morgan's Wonderland and ultimately Morgan's Inspiration Island," Hartman said.

On March 3, 2010, Morgan's Wonderland opened, with NBA legend David Robinson and actress Eva Longoria as special guests.

Starting in 2012, Toyota partnered with the park as a long-term sponsor.

On June 17, 2017, Morgan's Inspiration Island splash park was unveiled.

In 2020 the park closed after only 11 days into the season due to the COVID-19 pandemic. The park reopened for the 2021 season at limited capacity.

In 2022 the park hosted the Special Olympics Texas Summer Games. In 2026, the park opened "WingZ of Wonder", a ride which is designed to be accessible to wheelchair users.

== Events ==
The park holds a Snowball Run annually in December, which involves both 5K and 1K walking/running events. The events are open to all ages and abilities.

== Related complexes ==
=== Morgan's Inspiration Island ===
On June 17, 2017, Morgan's Wonderland unveiled the Morgan's Inspiration Island splash park. The park features waterproof wheelchairs that guests can use. Some parts of the park use warm water to be accessible to visitors with certain muscular conditions.

=== Morgan's Sports ===
In 2021, Morgan's Sports opened, which includes wheelchair-accessible baseball/softball and football fields, and basketball, pickleball, tennis, and volleyball courts.

=== Morgan's Camp ===
In summer 2022, Morgan's Camp opened, an accessible camping program that can serve about 500 campers of any ability. The San Antonio Food Bank uses the camp's kitchen year-round.

=== Morgan's MAC ===
The Multi-Assistance Center (MAC), which provides medical services to disabled individuals, opened on October 2, 2022. As of its opening, services provided included therapeutic care, dental care, and same day surgery.

== Awards and recognition ==
Morgan's Wonderland and Morgan's Inspiration Island have been acclaimed for their emphases on inclusion and accessible design.

Awards and Recognition
Year	Award
2017	World Waterpark Association – Leading Edge Award
2017	Paralyzed Veterans of America – Barrier-Free America
2017	Amusement Today – Park of the Year
2018	TIME – World's Greatest Places
2018	USA Today – Best New Attraction (Runner-up to Wonders of Wildlife)
