= 2014 Fort Lauderdale Strikers season =

Fort Lauderdale Strikers
2014 season
- Owner: Traffic Sports USA
- Head Coach: Günter Kronsteiner
- Stadium: Lockhart Stadium; Fort Lauderdale, Florida
- NASL: Spring: Fifth Fall: Fourth Combined: Fourth
- Soccer Bowl: Runner-up
- U.S. Open Cup: Third round
- Top goalscorer: League: Fafà Picault (12 goals); All: Fafà Picault (12 goals)
- Highest home attendance: 5,756 (October 25 v. FC Edmonton)
- Lowest home attendance: League: 2,409 (August 16 v. Atlanta); All: 785 (May 28 v. Laredo)
- Average home league attendance: League: 3,629; All: 3,426
Home colors	Away colors

The 2014 Fort Lauderdale Strikers season was the team's ninth season overall, and fourth in the North American Soccer League (NASL).

The season followed the Spring / Fall format adopted by the NASL in 2013 with the Spring season starting on April 12 and lasting for 9 games until June 8, while the Fall season began the night before the 2014 World Cup Final on July 12 and lasted November 1, for 18 games total. The winner of the Spring championship again hosted the 2014 Soccer Bowl.

== Club ==
As of July 15, 2014

No.	Position	Nation	Player
1	GK	SVK	Kamil Čontofalský
2	DF	SRB	Stefan Antonijevic
3	MF	USA	Mitchell Lopez
6	MF	GUY	Chris Nurse
7	MF	ARG	Gonzalo De Mujica
8	MF	BRA	Pecka
9	MF	URU	Martín Núñez
11	FW	HAI	Fafà Picault
12	DF	HON	Iván Guerrero
13	DF	USA	Justin Chavez
14	MF	HAI	James Marcelin
15	FW	USA	Aly Hassan
16	DF	ITA	Josh Travagli
17	MF	USA	Shawn Chin
18	DF	HAI	Stéphane Guillaume
19	FW	BRA	Jenison Brito
20	MF	ENG	Mark Anderson
21	MF	USA	Darnell King
22	GK	USA	Lionel Brown
23	MF	COL	Manny Gonzalez
24	GK	USA	David Meves
27	MF	NZL	Colin Murphy
28	MF	USA	Ronaldo Vieira
29	FW	CUB	Yaikel Pérez
33	DF	BRA	Rafael Alves
34	DF	USA	Darryl Gordon
73	MF	HON	Walter Ramirez

== Competitions ==
=== Pre-season and exhibitions ===
==== Pre-season ====
January 21, 2014 Friendly	Fort Lauderdale Strikers (United States)	0–2	Canada men's national team	Fort Lauderdale, U.S.
			Bekker (?); Froese (?)
Note: Not considered an official match by FIFA.

February 6 Friendly	Fort Lauderdale Strikers	1–2	New England Revolution	Bradenton, Florida
3:00 p.m. EST	24' #15 (yellow card) 45' #29 (yellow card) 51' (red card) 66'	Report	Imbongo 34'; Nguyen (yellow card) 84'; Barnes 91'	Stadium: IMG Academy

February 13 Friendly	Fort Lauderdale Strikers (United States)	4–2	(Switzerland) FC Red Star Zürich	Fort Lauderdale, Florida
		Report

February 22 Friendly	Fort Lauderdale Strikers	1–6	FC Dallas	Bradenton, Florida
12:00 p.m. EST	Hassan 8', (yellow card) 10'; Chin (yellow card) 39'	Report	Hernandez (yellow card) 9'; Pérez 17', 44'; Castillo 19'; Acosta 31'; Watson 57'; Michel 78' (pen.)	Stadium: IMG Academy; Referee: Andrew Pfeffercorn

March 7 Friendly	Fort Lauderdale Strikers	1–2	Florida Memorial Lions	Fort Lauderdale, Florida
10:30 a.m. EST	Nuñez 90'	Report	Umansky 70' (pen.); Fernandez 86'	Stadium: Lockhart Stadium

March 12 Friendly	Fort Lauderdale Strikers	8–2	Blue Star Honduras	Fort Lauderdale, Florida
8:00 p.m. EST	Nuñez 1'; Hassan 9'; King 15' 30'; Gonzalez 17'; Anderson 67' 85'; Pérez 90'	Report	Unknown 48' (pen.); Unknown 76'	Stadium: Lockhart Stadium

March 16 Friendly	Fort Lauderdale Strikers	6–1	FAU Owls	Boca Raton, Florida
4:00 p.m. EST	Nurse 20'; Anderson 50'; King 52'; Gonzalez 55'; Lopes 70'; Hassan 78' (pen.)	Report	Prichard 13'	Stadium: FAU Soccer Stadium; Attendance: 400+

March 22 Friendly	Nova Southeastern Sharks	1–3	Fort Lauderdale Strikers	Davie, Florida
7:00 p.m. EST	Spuntarelli 67'	Report	Picault 13'; Barrett 52'; Pérez 80'	Stadium: NSU Soccer Complex

March 26 Friendly	Fort Lauderdale Strikers	5–1	Red Force FC	Fort Lauderdale, Florida
8:00 p.m. EST	Salazar 13' (pen.); Hassan 64'; Picault 72'; Ebbers 84'; Anderson 85'	Report	77'	Stadium: Lockhart Stadium

March 28 Friendly	Fort Lauderdale Strikers	3–0	Florida Gulf Coast Eagles	Fort Lauderdale, Florida
11:00 a.m. EST	Murphy 70'; Hassan 80', 84'	Report		Stadium: Lockhart Stadium

March 30 Friendly	Don Bosco FC (Haiti)	2–0	(United States) Fort Lauderdale Strikers	Pétion-Ville, Haiti
7:00 p.m. EST				Stadium: Stade Pétion-Ville

April 5 Friendly	Fort Lauderdale Strikers	5–2	FIU Panthers	Fort Lauderdale, Florida
7:30 p.m. EST	King 10'; Ebbers 17', 43'; Salazar 23' (pen.); Nunez 50' (pen.)	Report	16'; 38'	Stadium: Lockhart Stadium

==== Exhibitions ====
July 4, 2014 Friendly	Tampa Bay Rowdies	3–1	Fort Lauderdale Strikers	St. Petersburg, Florida
6:30 p.m. EDT	Townsend 20'; Olguín 88'; Walker 89'	Report	Gonzalez 36'	Stadium: Al Lang Field; Attendance: 4,105

=== NASL Spring Season ===
The Spring season will last for 9 games beginning on April 12 and ending on June 8. The schedule will feature a single round robin format with each team playing every other team in the league a single time. Half the teams will host 5 home games and play 4 road games whereas the other half of the teams will play 4 home games and 5 road games.

==== Standings ====
Pos	Team	Pld	W	D	L	GF	GA	GD	Pts	Qualification
1	Minnesota United (S)	9	6	2	1	16	9	+7	20	Playoffs
2	New York Cosmos	9	6	1	2	14	3	+11	19	
3	San Antonio Scorpions	9	5	2	2	13	9	+4	17	
4	Carolina RailHawks	9	4	2	3	11	15	−4	14	
5	Fort Lauderdale Strikers	9	4	1	4	18	18	0	13	
6	Ottawa Fury	9	3	1	5	14	13	+1	10	
7	Tampa Bay Rowdies	9	2	4	3	11	16	−5	10	
8	Atlanta Silverbacks	9	3	1	5	12	20	−8	10	
9	FC Edmonton	9	2	2	5	11	11	0	8	
10	Indy Eleven	9	0	4	5	14	20	−6	4	

Source: NASL Standings
(S) Spring season champion

==== Results ====
Overall								Home						Away					
Pld	W	D	L	GF	GA	GD	Pts	W	D	L	GF	GA	GD	W	D	L	GF	GA	GD
9	4	1	4	18	18	0	13	3	0	1	9	5	+4	1	1	3	9	13	−4

Last updated: 26 May 2014.
Source: https://www.nasl.com/standings/season/8945

===== Results by round =====
Round	1	2	3	4	5	6	7	8	9
Ground	H	A	H	A	H	A	A	H	A
Result	W	L	W	W	W	L	L	L	D
Position	3	4	3	2	1	3	4		5

Updated to match(es) played on 13 May 2014. Source: nasl.com
A = Away; H = Home; W = Win; D = Draw; L = Loss

==== Match reports ====
April 12, 2014 Match 1	Fort Lauderdale Strikers (United States)	2–0	(Canada) Ottawa Fury FC	Fort Lauderdale, Florida
7:30 p.m. EDT	Alves 13'; King 80'			Stadium: Lockhart Stadium; Attendance: 3,105; Referee: Ted Unkel

April 19, 2014 Match 2	Carolina RailHawks	4–1	Fort Lauderdale Strikers	Cary, North Carolina
7:30 p.m. EDT	Martinez 27' (pen.), 72'; Schilawski 40', 76'		Nurse 47'	Stadium: WakeMed Soccer Park; Attendance: 4,007; Referee: Mark Kadlecik

April 26, 2014 Match 3	Fort Lauderdale Strikers	3–2	Indy Eleven	Fort Lauderdale, Florida
7:30 p.m. EDT	Nuñez 7'; Picault 69'; Ebbers 73'		Kléberson 26' (pen.); Norales 90+4'	Stadium: Lockhart Stadium; Attendance: 3,515; Referee: Daniel Fitzgerald

May 3, 2014 Match 4	FC Edmonton (Canada)	1–3	(United States) Fort Lauderdale Strikers	Edmonton, Alberta
9:00 p.m. EDT	Fordyce 73'		Nuñez 40'; Picault 63'; Anderson 78' (pen.)	Stadium: Clarke Stadium; Attendance: 3,276; Referee: Alain Ruch

May 10, 2014 Match 5	Fort Lauderdale Strikers	4–0	Atlanta Silverbacks	Fort Lauderdale, Florida
7:30 p.m. EDT	Nuñez 23'; Anderson 50'; Salazar 85'; Picault 90+2' (pen.)			Stadium: Lockhart Stadium; Attendance: 3,109; Referee: Alan Kelly

May 17, 2014 Match 6	Minnesota United FC	3–1	Fort Lauderdale Strikers	Blaine, Minnesota
8:00 p.m. EDT	Bracalello 12' (pen.); Ramirez 58'; Ibarra 70'		Nuñez 50'	Stadium: NSC Stadium; Attendance: 5,325; Referee: Fotis Bazakos

May 24, 2014 Match 7	Tampa Bay Rowdies	3–2	Fort Lauderdale Strikers	St. Petersburg, Florida
7:30 p.m. EDT	Hunt 45+1'; Wallace 62'; Wagner 90+2'		Anderson 19'; Chin 34'	Stadium: Al Lang Stadium; Attendance: 4,331; Referee: Robert Sibiga

May 31, 2014 Match 8	Fort Lauderdale Strikers	0–3	New York Cosmos	Fort Lauderdale, Florida
7:30 p.m. EDT			Stokkelien 64' (pen.); Ockford 83'; Szetela 85'	Stadium: Lockhart Stadium; Attendance: 5,572; Referee: Ted Unkel

June 7, 2014 Match 9	San Antonio Scorpions	2–2	Fort Lauderdale Strikers	San Antonio, Texas
7:30 p.m. EDT	Touray 24'; Soto 57'		Chin 10'; Picault 90'	Stadium: Toyota Field; Attendance: 6,484; Referee: Armando Villarreal

=== NASL Fall Season ===
The Fall season will last for 18 games beginning on July 12 and ending on November 1. The schedule will feature a double round robin format with each team playing every other team in the league twice, one at home and one on the road. The winner of the Fall season will play the winner of the Spring season in the Soccer Bowl 2014 Championship game except if the Spring and Fall Champions are the same team in which case the team with the best overall Spring and Fall record behind that team will be their opponent.

==== Standings ====
Pos	Team	Pld	W	D	L	GF	GA	GD	Pts	Qualification
1	San Antonio Scorpions (F)	18	11	2	5	30	15	+15	35	Playoffs
2	Minnesota United	18	10	5	3	31	19	+12	35	
3	FC Edmonton	18	8	5	5	23	18	+5	29	
4	Fort Lauderdale Strikers	18	7	6	5	20	21	−1	27	
5	Carolina RailHawks	18	7	3	8	27	28	−1	24	
6	New York Cosmos	18	5	8	5	23	24	−1	23	
7	Indy Eleven	18	6	5	7	21	26	−5	23	
8	Tampa Bay Rowdies	18	5	5	8	25	34	−9	20	
9	Ottawa Fury	18	4	5	9	20	25	−5	17	
10	Atlanta Silverbacks	18	3	4	11	20	30	−10	13	

Source: NASL Standings
(F) Fall season champion

==== Results ====
Overall								Home						Away					
Pld	W	D	L	GF	GA	GD	Pts	W	D	L	GF	GA	GD	W	D	L	GF	GA	GD
18	7	6	5	20	21	−1	27	5	3	1	10	7	+3	2	3	4	10	14	−4

Last updated: November 7, 2014.

===== Results by round =====
Round	1	2	3	4	5	6	7	8	9	10	11	12	13	14	15	16	17	18
Ground	H	A	H	H	A	A	H	A	H	A	A	H	A	H	A	A	H	H
Result	L	L	D	W	D	W	D	L	W	L	L	W	W	W	D	D	W	D
Position	10	10	10	9	9	5	4	7	5	6		7	6	3	4	4	4	4

Updated to match(es) played on November 7, 2014. Source: Spring season 2014 results
A = Away; H = Home; W = Win; D = Draw; L = Loss

==== Match reports ====
July 12, 2014 Match 1	Fort Lauderdale Strikers	0–3	Minnesota United FC	Fort Lauderdale, Florida
7:30 p.m. EDT	Anderson (yellow card) 36'; Gordon (yellow card) 81'	Report; Report	Mendes 23'; Pitchkolan (yellow card) 35'; Ramirez 59'; Ibarra 78'	Stadium: Lockhart Stadium; Attendance: 3,092; Referee: Andres Pfefferkorn

July 19, 2014 Match 2	San Antonio Scorpions	0–2	Fort Lauderdale Strikers	San Antonio, Texas
8:45 p.m. EDT	Zahorski (yellow card) 16', (goal) 43' deRoux (yellow card) 27'; Forbes 43'; Bingham (yellow card) 81'; James (red card) 90'	Report; Report	Jenison Brito (yellow card) 24'; Alves (yellow card) 50'	Stadium: Toyota Field; Attendance: 6,958; Referee: Luis Guardia

July 26, 2014 Match 3	Fort Lauderdale Strikers	1–1	New York Cosmos	Fort Lauderdale, Florida
7:30 p.m. EDT	Jenison Brito 24' (pen.); Vieira (red card) 39'; Chin (yellow card) 85'	Report	Johnson 7' (yellow card) 62'; Murphy (yellow card) 15'; Ayoze (yellow card) 24'	Stadium: Lockhart Stadium; Attendance: 3,257; Referee: Younes Marrakchi

August 2, 2014 Match 4	Fort Lauderdale Strikers	1–0	Tampa Bay Rowdies	Fort Lauderdale, Florida
7:30 p.m. EDT	King (yellow card) 30'; Picault 72'	Report; Report	Russell (yellow card) 68'	Stadium: Lockhart Stadium; Attendance: 2,648; Referee: Kevin Terry Jr.

August 6, 2014 Match 5	Indy Eleven	0–0	Fort Lauderdale Strikers	Indianapolis, Indiana
7:30 p.m. EDT	Smart (yellow card) 17'; Johnson (yellow card) 45' (red card) 58'; Peña (yellow card) 64'	Report; Report	Picault (yellow card) 51'; King (yellow card) 70'; Gonzalez (yellow card) 90'	Stadium: Michael A. Carroll Stadium; Attendance: 10,285; Referee: Mark Allatin

August 9, 2014 Match 6	Ottawa Fury FC (Canada)	1–2	(United States) Fort Lauderdale Strikers	Ottawa, Ontario, Canada
7:00 p.m. EDT	Haworth 10'; Beckie (yellow card) 20'	Report; Report	Picault 16' (yellow card) 44'; King (yellow card) 54'; Gonzalez (yellow card) 68'	Stadium: TD Place Stadium; Attendance: 4,814; Referee: Marie-Soleil Beaudoin

August 16, 2014 Match 7	Fort Lauderdale Strikers	1–1	Atlanta Silverbacks	Fort Lauderdale, Florida
7:30 p.m. EDT	King (yellow card) 45'; Picault 62'; Ramirez (red card) 90'	Report; Report	Espinoza (yellow card) 6'; Chavez 7'; Cruz (yellow card) 90'	Stadium: Lockhart Stadium; Attendance: 2,409; Referee: Daniel Fitzgerald

August 24, 2014 Match 8	FC Edmonton (Canada)	2–1	(United States) Fort Lauderdale Strikers	Edmonton, Alberta, Canada
4:00 p.m. EDT	Raudales (yellow card) 6'; Nonni (yellow card) 25'; Jones 33'; Burt (yellow card) 37'; Ameobi (yellow card) 45'; Laing 72'; Hlavaty (yellow card) 84' (yellow-red card) 90'; Edward (yellow card) 86'; Jonke (yellow card) 90'	Report; Report	Pecka (yellow card) 6'; Anderson (yellow card) 12'; Alves (yellow card) 27'; Nurse (yellow card) 76'; Hassan 86' (pen.)	Stadium: Clarke Stadium; Attendance: 3,111; Referee: Sheena Dickson

August 29, 2014 Match 9	Fort Lauderdale Strikers	2–0	San Antonio Scorpions	Fort Lauderdale, Florida
7:30 p.m. EDT	Picault (yellow card) 11' (goal) 43'; Alves (yellow card) 23'; Hassan (red card) 64'; Pecka (yellow card) 68'; Anderson 79' (yellow card) 90'	Report; Report	Forbes (yellow card) 14'; Restrepo (yellow card) 45'; Janicki (yellow card) 74'; Borrajo (yellow card) 86'; Elizondo (yellow card) 90'	Stadium: Lockhart Stadium; Attendance: 3,006; Referee: Fotis Bazakos

September 6, 2014 Match 10	New York Cosmos	2–0	Fort Lauderdale Strikers	Hempstead, New York
7:00 p.m. EDT	Ayoze (yellow card) 8'; Mwanga 17'; Marcos Senna 30' (pen.); Szetela (yellow card) 33'; Diosa (yellow card) 90'	Report; Report		Stadium: Shuart Stadium; Attendance: 3,626; Referee: Jorge Gonzalez

September 13, 2014 Match 11	Minnesota United FC	2–1	Fort Lauderdale Strikers	Blaine, Minnesota
9:00 p.m. EDT	Ramirez 38'; Ibarra 54'; Reed (yellow card) 80'	Report; Report	Pecka 31'; Antonijevic (yellow card) 37'; Anderson (yellow card) 40'; Nurse (yellow card) 74'; Guillaume (yellow card) 79'	Stadium: NSC Stadium; Attendance: 6,202; Referee: Christopher Penso

September 20, 2014 Match 12	Fort Lauderdale Strikers	2–1	Indy Eleven	Fort Lauderdale, Florida
7:30 p.m. EDT	Picault 1'; Chavez (yellow card) 20'; Nuñez 55'; Nurse (yellow card) 70'; King 90'	Report; Report	Frias 39' (yellow card) 79'; Peña (yellow card) 45'; Kleberson (yellow card) 76'; Mares (yellow card) 90'	Stadium: Lockhart Stadium; Attendance: 3,112; Referee: Marcos DeOliveira

October 4, 2014 Match 13	Fort Lauderdale Strikers	1–0	Carolina RailHawks	Fort Lauderdale, Florida
7:30 p.m. EDT	Anderson 59'; Guerrero (yellow card) 90'	Report; Report	Sandoval (yellow card) 21'; Scott (yellow card) 27'; Bentick (yellow card) 87'	Stadium: Lockhart Stadium; Attendance: 3,052; Referee: Andres Pfefferkorn

October 8, 2014 Match 14	Tampa Bay Rowdies	2–3	Fort Lauderdale Strikers	St. Petersburg, Florida
7:30 p.m. EDT	Mkandawire 11'; Russell 38'; Frimpong (yellow card) 54'	Report; Report	Picault 43' 44'; Chin 56'; Nurse (yellow card) 80'; Čontofalský (yellow card) 90'	Stadium: Al Lang Stadium; Attendance: 3,865; Referee: Alex Chilowicz

October 11, 2014 Match 15	Atlanta Silverbacks	2–2	Fort Lauderdale Strikers	Atlanta
7:30 p.m. EDT	Sandoval 47'; Alves 89' (own goal); Roushandel (yellow card) 90'	Report; Report	Hassan 25'; King (yellow card) 41'; Picault 79'	Stadium: Silverbacks Park; Attendance: 2,905; Referee: Mark Kadlecik

October 18, 2014 Match 16	Carolina RailHawks	1–1	Fort Lauderdale Strikers	Cary, North Carolina
7:30 p.m. EDT	Novo 82'; Scott (yellow card) 89'	Report; Report	Anderson 67'; Marcelin (yellow card) 74'; Chavez (yellow card) 90'	Stadium: WakeMed Soccer Park; Attendance: 4,179; Referee: Marcos DeOliveira

October 25, 2014 Match 17	Fort Lauderdale Strikers	1–0	FC Edmonton	Fort Lauderdale, Florida
7:30 p.m. EDT	Čontofalský (yellow card) 50'; Marcelin (yellow card) 72'; Pecka 83'	Report; Report	Jones (yellow card) 6'; James (yellow card) 45'; Hlavaty (yellow card) 75'	Stadium: Lockhart Stadium; Attendance: 5,756; Referee: Robert Sibiga

November 1, 2014 Match 18	Fort Lauderdale Strikers	1–1	Ottawa Fury FC	Fort Lauderdale, Florida
7:30 p.m. EDT	Picault (yellow card) 65'; Brown (yellow card) 65'; Hassan 86'	Report; Report	Paterson 16' (yellow card) 65'; Eustaquio (red card) 54'; Oliver (yellow card) 80'; Haworth (yellow card) 82'	Stadium: Lockhart Stadium; Attendance: 5,505; Referee: Ismail Elfath

=== U.S. Open Cup ===
The Strikers exited the 2014 Open Cup in the Third Round after an upset loss to the Premier Development League's Laredo Heat.

May 28 Third Round	Fort Lauderdale Strikers (Florida)	2–3	(Texas) Laredo Heat	Fort Lauderdale, Florida
19:30 ET	De Mujica 8'; Pérez 12'; Brown (red card) 20'; Pecka (yellow card) 40'	Report	Villanueva 27'; Hernandez (yellow card) 47'; Buduri (red card) 80'; Alvarado 86'; Bayona 90+2' (pen.)	Stadium: Lockhart Stadium; Attendance: 785; Referee: Caleb Mendez

== Stats ==
=== Top scorers ===
Includes all competitive matches. The list is sorted by shirt number when total goals are equal.

Ran	No.	Pos	Nat	Name	NASL	U.S. Open Cup	Total
1	11	FW	(Haiti)	Fafà Picault	12	0	12
2	20	MF	(England)	Mark Anderson	6	0	6
3	9	MF	(Uruguay)	Martin Nuñez	5	0	5
4	15	FW	(United States)	Aly Hassan	3	0	3
4	17	MF	(United States)	Shawn Chin	3	0	3
5	8	MF	(Brazil)	Pecka	2	0	2
5	21	MF	(United States)	Darnell King	2	0	2
6	6	MF	(Guyana)	Chris Nurse	1	0	1
6	7	MF	(Argentina)	Gonzalo De Mujica	0	1	1
6	14	MF	(Colombia)	Carlos Salazar	1	0	1
6	19	FW	(Brazil)	Jenison Brito	1	0	1
6	19	FW	(Germany)	Marius Ebbers	1	0	1
6	29	FW	(Cuba)	Yaikel Pérez	0	1	1
6	33	DF	(Brazil)	Rafael Alves	1	0	1
				TOTALS	38	2	40

Last updated: November 7, 2014

=== Top assists ===
Includes all competitive matches. The list is sorted by shirt number when total assists are equal.

Ran	No.	Pos	Nat	Name	NASL	U.S. Open Cup	Total
1	17	MF	(United States)	Shawn Chin	5	0	5
2	21	MF	(United States)	Darnell King	4	0	4
3	12	DF	(Honduras)	Iván Guerrero	3	0	3
3	14	MF	(Colombia)	Carlos Salazar	1	2	3
5	9	MF	(Uruguay)	Martin Nuñez	2	0	2
5	11	FW	(Haiti)	Fafà Picault	2	0	2
5	19	FW	(Germany)	Marius Ebbers	2	0	2
5	20	MF	(England)	Mark Anderson	2	0	2
6	14	MF	(Haiti)	James Marcelin	1	0	1
6	73	MF	(Honduras)	Walter Ramirez	1	0	1
				TOTALS	23	2	25

Last updated: November 7, 2014
