= Soccer Bowl 2014 =

Soccer match

- Event: Soccer Bowl
San Antonio Scorpions	Fort Lauderdale Strikers
2	1
- Date: November 15, 2014
- Venue: Toyota Field, San Antonio, Texas
- Man of the Match: Rafael Castillo (SAS)
- Referee: Ted Unkel
- Attendance: 7,847

NASL Championship Final 2014 was the North American Soccer League's postseason championship match of the 2014 season to determine the NASL Champion. The event was contested in a one-game match between the San Antonio Scorpions (Fall Season champions) and the Fort Lauderdale Strikers. San Antonio defeated the New York Cosmos 2-1 in their semi-final match while Fort Lauderdale defeated Minnesota United FC (Spring Season champions) in a penalty shootout 5–4 after a 1–1 tie in the other semi-final game. The match was played on November 15, 2014, at Toyota Field, in San Antonio, Texas and televised live on ESPN3, ONE World Sports, NASLLive.com as well as on San Antonio's MeTV KSAT 12.2 and Fort Lauderdale's Sofloradio.com. This was the Scorpions first Soccer Bowl championship. The Soccer Bowl trophy is the third oldest men's professional outdoor soccer league prize in the United States.

== Background ==
Neither the Scorpions nor the Strikers have ever lifted the NASL Soccer Bowl trophy. The Strikers are making their third overall appearance (between NASL Golden and Modern Eras) in the league's championship final, while the Scorpions are playing in their first ever title game. San Antonio is coming off a 2–1 victory over the visiting New York Cosmos in The Championship Semifinals. In the other semifinal match, Fort Lauderdale topped Minnesota United FC, 5–4, on penalty kicks to earn its first berth to the finals since 2011. The Strikers were on an eight-game unbeaten streak, while the Scorpions had won their last three encounters.

San Antonio leads the head-to-head series against Fort Lauderdale, however, the teams played an even series this year (1-1-1). The last meeting between the two sides took place on August 29 when goals from forward Fafà Picault and midfielder Mark Anderson gave the Strikers a 2–0 home victory at Lockhart Stadium.

== Game summary ==
Before a modern-era NASL Championship game record crowd of 7,847 on a cold and misty night at Toyota Field, the San Antonio Scorpions reached the top of the NASL mountain and raised the Soccer Bowl trophy for the first time in their history with a 2–1 win over a determined Fort Lauderdale Strikers.

The Alamo City lads triumphed on the strength of a spectacular 70th minute bicycle kick goal by Rafael Castillo and a 75th minute breakaway strike by Billy Forbes. The Strikers had a golden opportunity to grab the lead just past the hour mark, but rattled the cross bar from the penalty spot. Fort Lauderdale ensured the closing 11 minutes would be tense when Walter Ramirez halved the deficit. As the game unfolded, both the Scorpions and the Strikers began to grow in confidence. San Antonio was unable to take advantage of two corner kicks in the span of a minute as Fort Lauderdale contained the threat and pushed out on the counterattack.

San Antonio came close to breaking the scoring open in the 15th minute when Rafael Castillo sent a free kick into the box that Greg Janicki got his head on, but his effort went wide of the goal. In the 20th minute Castillo got the crowd on their feet with a shot from 30 yards out that went wide of a diving Kamil Contofalsky and also beyond the goal. Six minutes elapsed before the Strikers got another chance to counterattack, but after Darnell King raced down the left side his pass into the box was just out of reach of Mark Anderson and the scorebook remained closed for the time being. The Strikers twice nearly broke the first half deadlock through Aly Alberto Hassan as his effort beat Josh Saunders but bounced outside of the left post. In the 62nd minute the Strikers nearly went ahead through a long-range effort by Shawn Chin, but Saunders was on the spot and dived low to make the save. On the rebound the Strikers were awarded a penalty kick after Anderson was brought down in the box. Martin Nunez stepped up to the spot, but his effort glanced off the top of the crossbar and a golden chance went begging.

The Scorpions finally opened the scoring in the 70th minute in spectacular fashion. Castillo produced a perfectly executed bicycle kick that flew beyond the reach of Contofalsky and tucked inside the far left post to send the Toyota Field crowd wild. In the 74th minute Forbes doubled the advantage and had the Scorpions believing they had one hand on the trophy after he reached Castillo's long through ball and raced around Contofalsky to put the Scorpions ahead 2-0. Fort Lauderdale fought back in the 79th minute when substitute Ramirez got the better of Saunders, finishing off a give-and-go with Anderson with a roofed shot that meant the hosts lived nervously during the closing stages of the match. The first yellow card of an intense game was not issued until the 84th minute when Scorpions substitute Giuseppe Gentile brought Chin down from behind on a slide tackle, and San Antonio's Hassli also picked up a card after he came in late on a tackle.

San Antonio held on for the final minutes, as Fort Lauderdale threw everything they had at them, to become the fourth different team to hoist the coveted Soccer Bowl trophy in as many years in the NASL's modern era.

=== Championship results ===
November 15, 2014
8:30 pm EST

San Antonio Scorpions	2–1	Fort Lauderdale Strikers
Castillo 69'; Forbes 74'	Report; Report	Nuñez; Ramírez 79'

Toyota Field, San Antonio, Texas
Attendance: 7,847
Referee: Ted Unkel

San Antonio Scorpions	Fort Lauderdale Strikers

2014 NASL Champions: San Antonio Scorpions

San Antonio Scorpions:
GK	25	(United States) Josh Saunders
DF	2	(United States) Jonathan Borrajo
DF	3	(Trinidad and Tobago) Julius James
DF	12	(United States) Greg Janicki
DF	21	(Jamaica) Stephen DeRoux
MF	5	(El Salvador) Richard Menjivar
MF	7	(United States) Wálter Restrepo		(substituted off) 85'
MF	16	(Colombia) Rafael Castillo
MF	19	(United States) Josue Soto
FW	8	(Turks and Caicos Islands) Billy Forbes
FW	10	(Costa Rica) César Elizondo		(substituted off) 74'
Substitutes:
GK	1	(United States) Daryl Sattler
DF	44	(United States) Juan Leone Cruz
FW	9	(Trinidad and Tobago) Trevin Caesar
FW	20	(The Gambia) Sainey Touray
FW	22	(Poland) Tomasz Zahorski
FW	28	(United States) Giuseppe Gentile	(yellow card) 84'	(substituted on) 74'
MF	29	(France) Eric Hassli	(yellow card) 88'	(substituted on) 85'
Manager:
(Canada) Alen Marcina

Fort Lauderdale Strikers:
GK	1	(Slovakia) Kamil Čontofalský
DF	21	(United States) Darnell King
DF	33	(Brazil) Rafael Alves
DF	2	(Serbia) Stefan Antonijevic	(substituted off) 77'
DF	12	(Honduras) Iván Guerrero
MF	8	(Brazil) Pecka
MF	14	(Haiti) James Marcelin
MF	9	(Uruguay) Martín Núñez	(substituted off) 73'
MF	17	(United States) Shawn Chin
MF	20	(England) Mark Anderson
FW	15	(United States) Aly Hassan	(substituted off) 60'
Substitutes:
GK	22	(United States) Lionel Brown
DF	5	(United States) Justin Chavez
DF	18	(Haiti) Stéphane Guillaume
MF	6	(Guyana) Chris Nurse
MF	11	(United States) Fafà Picault	(substituted on) 60'
FW	19	(Brazil) Jenison Brito	(substituted on) 77'
MF	73	(Honduras) Walter Ramírez	(substituted on) 73'
Manager:
(Austria) Günter Kronsteiner

Man of the Match:

Rafael Castillo (San Antonio Scorpions)

MATCH OFFICIALS

- Assistant referees:
  - Gianni Facchini
  - Felisha Mariscal
- Fourth official: Armando Villarreal

== See also ==
- 2014 in American soccer
- 2014 North American Soccer League season
