= 2014 North American Soccer League season =

North American Soccer League
- Season: 2014
- Champions: San Antonio Scorpions
- North American Supporters' Trophy: Minnesota United FC
- Matches: 135
- Goals: 374 (2.77 per match)
- Top goalscorer: (United States) Christian Ramirez (20)
- Biggest home win: SAN 7 vs TB 0 (10/11)
- Biggest away win: NYC 3 @ TB 0 (5/17); NYC 3 @ FTL 0 (5/31)
- Highest scoring: CAR 5 vs NYC 4 (9/20)
- Longest winning run: MIN (4 games) (4/12 – 5/3) (9/13-10/4)
- Longest unbeaten run: SAN (9 games) (5/10 – 7/26)
- Longest winless run: IND (9 games) (4/12 – 6/7)
- Longest losing run: ATL (6 games) (9/6 – 10/4)
- Highest attendance: 34,047; OTT @ MIN (8/2)
- Lowest attendance: 2,158; CAR @ OTT (4/26)
- Total attendance: 742,695 (Spring & Fall)
- Average attendance: 5,501

The 2014 North American Soccer League season was the 47th season of Division II soccer in the United States and the fourth season of the revived North American Soccer League. It was contested by ten teams including two from Canada. Joining the NASL in the Spring of 2014 were two new franchises, Indy Eleven and Ottawa Fury FC; originally Virginia Cavalry FC was to begin playing this season but now plans to join in the 2016 season. The defending Soccer Bowl champions are the New York Cosmos, while the Carolina Railhawks are the defending North American Supporters' Trophy winners. A split season format was used again for the 2014 season.

== Teams, stadiums, and personnel ==
=== Stadiums and locations ===
Locations of NASL clubs

=== Personnel and sponsorship ===
Team	Head coach	Captain	Kit producer	Shirt sponsor
Atlanta Silverbacks	(United States) Jason Smith	(United States) Mike Randolph	Nike	People HRO
Carolina RailHawks	(Northern Ireland) Colin Clarke	(Puerto Rico) Kupono Low	Adidas	Blue Cross Blue Shield of NC
FC Edmonton	(Canada) Colin Miller	(Northern Ireland) Albert Watson	Adidas	The Fath Group
Fort Lauderdale Strikers	(Austria) Günter Kronsteiner	(Honduras) Iván Guerrero	Acerbis	
Indy Eleven	(United States) Juergen Sommer	(Germany) Kristian Nicht	Diadora	Honda
Minnesota United FC	(United States) Manny Lagos	(United States) Aaron Pitchkolan	Admiral	Atomic Data / Mall of America
New York Cosmos	(Venezuela) Giovanni Savarese	(United States) Carlos Mendes	Nike	Emirates
Ottawa Fury FC	(Canada) Marc Dos Santos	(Republic of Ireland) Richie Ryan	Admiral	Heart and Crown
San Antonio Scorpions	(Canada) Alen Marcina	(Canada) Adrian Cann	Nike	Toyota
Tampa Bay Rowdies	(England) Ricky Hill	(United States) Frankie Sanfilippo	Admiral	Hard Rock

=== Managerial changes ===
Team	Outgoing manager	Manner of departure	Date of vacancy	Position in table	Incoming manager	Date of appointment
Atlanta Silverbacks	(Trinidad and Tobago) Brian Haynes	Contract not renewed	9 December 2013	Pre-Season	(United States) Eric Wynalda	7 January 2014
Atlanta Silverbacks	(United States) Eric Wynalda	Voluntary move to team technical director	17 July 2014	8th	(United States) Jason Smith	18 July 2014
Atlanta Silverbacks	(United States) Jason Smith	Fired	5 October 2014	10th	(Uruguay) Alejandro Pombo – Interim Head Coach	5 October 2014
San Antonio Scorpions	(Canada) Alen Marcina	End of interim period	22 November 2013	Pre-Season	(Canada) Alen Marcina	22 November 2013
Indy Eleven	Expansion team				(United States) Juergen Sommer	11 June 2013
Ottawa Fury FC	Expansion team				(Canada) Marc Dos Santos	23 May 2013

== Spring season ==
The Spring season lasted for 9 games beginning on April 12 and ending on June 8. The schedule featured a single round robin format with each team playing every other team in the league a single time. Half the teams will host 5 home games and play 4 road games whereas the other half of the teams will play 4 home games and 5 road games. The winner of the Spring season earns one of four berths in the playoffs, now known as The Championship.

=== Standings ===
Pos	Team	Pld	W	D	L	GF	GA	GD	Pts	Qualification
1	Minnesota United (S)	9	6	2	1	16	9	+7	20	Playoffs
2	New York Cosmos	9	6	1	2	14	3	+11	19	
3	San Antonio Scorpions	9	5	2	2	13	9	+4	17	
4	Carolina RailHawks	9	4	2	3	11	15	−4	14	
5	Fort Lauderdale Strikers	9	4	1	4	18	18	0	13	
6	Ottawa Fury	9	3	1	5	14	13	+1	10	
7	Tampa Bay Rowdies	9	2	4	3	11	16	−5	10	
8	Atlanta Silverbacks	9	3	1	5	12	20	−8	10	
9	FC Edmonton	9	2	2	5	11	11	0	8	
10	Indy Eleven	9	0	4	5	14	20	−6	4	

Source: NASL Standings
(S) Spring season champion

=== Results ===
Home \ Away	ATL	CAR	FCE	FTL	IND	MNU	NYC	OTT	SAS	TBR
Atlanta Silverbacks					3–3	1–2		2–1	1–2	
Carolina RailHawks	2–0			4–1			1–0			2–0
Edmonton	1–2	6–1		1–3			0–1			
Fort Lauderdale Strikers	4–0				3–2		0–3	2–0		
Indy Eleven		1–1	1–2					2–4	1–2	1–1
Minnesota United		0–0	1–0	3–1	3–2					
New York Cosmos	4–0				1–1	1–0		1–0	0–1	
Ottawa Fury		4–0	1–0			1–2			2–3	1–1
San Antonio Scorpions		3–0	0–0	2–2		0–2				0–1
Tampa Bay Rowdies	1–3		1–1	3–2		3–3	0–3			

Updated to match(es) played on June 8, 2014. Source:
Legend: Blue = home team win; Yellow = draw; Red = away team win.

== Fall season ==
The Fall season will begin following a break for the 2014 FIFA World Cup on July 19 and ending on November 2, with each team playing the others twice, once home and once away. The winner of the Fall season will earn automatic berth in The Championship.

=== Standings ===
Pos	Team	Pld	W	D	L	GF	GA	GD	Pts	Qualification
1	San Antonio Scorpions (F)	18	11	2	5	30	15	+15	35	Playoffs
2	Minnesota United	18	10	5	3	31	19	+12	35	
3	FC Edmonton	18	8	5	5	23	18	+5	29	
4	Fort Lauderdale Strikers	18	7	6	5	20	21	−1	27	
5	Carolina RailHawks	18	7	3	8	27	28	−1	24	
6	New York Cosmos	18	5	8	5	23	24	−1	23	
7	Indy Eleven	18	6	5	7	21	26	−5	23	
8	Tampa Bay Rowdies	18	5	5	8	25	34	−9	20	
9	Ottawa Fury	18	4	5	9	20	25	−5	17	
10	Atlanta Silverbacks	18	3	4	11	20	30	−10	13	

Source: NASL Standings
(F) Fall season champion

=== Results ===
Home \ Away	ATL	CAR	FCE	FTL	IND	MNU	NYC	OTT	SAS	TBR
Atlanta Silverbacks		0–2	1–0	2–2	1–2	1–1	1–2	0–3	0–1	1–1
Carolina RailHawks	0–2		2–3	1–1	1–2	2–2	5–4	3–0	3–1	3–4
Edmonton	2–1	3–0		2–1	0–1	2–1	1–1	0–0	3–1	1–0
Fort Lauderdale Strikers	1–1	1–0	1–0		2–1	0–3	1–1	1–1	2–0	1–0
Indy Eleven	2–4	0–1	1–1	0–0		2–0	2–2	1–2	1–0	1–2
Minnesota United	1–0	1–0	3–2	2–1	5–1		0–0	2–1	0–1	1–1
New York Cosmos	3–2	0–1	0–0	2–0	0–0	1–1		2–1	1–3	2–2
Ottawa Fury	2–0	2–2	0–2	1–2	1–2	2–3	0–1		1–1	0–2
San Antonio Scorpions	2–1	2–0	3–0	2–0	2–0	0–2	1–0	1–1		7–0
Tampa Bay Rowdies	3–2	0–1	1–1	2–3	2–2	2–3	3–1	0–2	0–2	

Updated to match(es) played on November 2, 2014. Source:
Legend: Blue = home team win; Yellow = draw; Red = away team win.

== Playoffs ==
The playoffs were contested by the winners of the spring and fall seasons hosting the next best two teams in the full year regular season table. The half-season champions earned the top two seeds, with the higher seed going to the team with the better full-season record. The two next-best teams earned the third and fourth seeds. The semifinals took place on November 8 and 9, with the #1 seed hosting the #4 seed and #2 hosting #3. The winners met in Soccer Bowl 2014 on November 15, hosted by the team with the higher seed.

=== Combined standings ===
Pos	Team	Pld	W	D	L	GF	GA	GD	Pts	Qualification
1	Minnesota United (X)	27	16	7	4	47	28	+19	55	Championship qualifiers
2	San Antonio Scorpions (C)	27	16	4	7	43	24	+19	52	Championship qualifiers
3	New York Cosmos	27	11	9	7	37	27	+10	42	Championship qualifiers
4	Fort Lauderdale Strikers	27	11	7	9	38	39	−1	40	Championship qualifiers
5	Carolina RailHawks	27	11	5	11	38	43	−5	38	
6	FC Edmonton	27	10	7	10	34	29	+5	37	
7	Tampa Bay Rowdies	27	7	9	11	36	50	−14	30	
8	Ottawa Fury	27	7	6	14	34	38	−4	27	
9	Indy Eleven	27	6	9	12	35	46	−11	27	
10	Atlanta Silverbacks	27	6	5	16	32	50	−18	23	

(C) Champions; (X) North American Supporters' Trophy winner

=== The Championship ===
==== Participants ====
- Minnesota United (Spring season champion)
- San Antonio Scorpions (Fall season champion)
- New York Cosmos
- Fort Lauderdale Strikers

==== Semifinals ====
November 8, 2014
7:00 pm EST

Minnesota United	1–1 (a.e.t.)	Fort Lauderdale Strikers
Ibarra 34'; Mendes (yellow card) 50'	Report; Report	Kronsteiner (red card) 71'; Anderson (yellow card) 83'; Nuñez (yellow card) 87' (goal) 90+1'; Marcelin (yellow card) 105'; Brito (yellow card) 118'
Penalties
Venegas (penalty missed); Calvano (penalty scored); Ibarra (penalty scored); Vicentini (penalty scored); Campos (penalty scored); Pitchkolan (penalty missed)	4 – 5	(penalty scored) Hassan; (penalty scored) Anderson; (penalty scored) Picault; (penalty scored) Núñez; (penalty missed) Brito; (penalty scored) Pecka

National Sports Center, Blaine, Minnesota
Attendance: 6,113
Referee: Fotis Bazakos
November 8, 2014
8:30 pm EST

San Antonio Scorpions	2–1 (a.e.t.)	New York Cosmos
Castillo 19' (yellow card) 55'; DeRoux (yellow card) 83'; Restrepo 110'	Report; Report	Stokkelien 17'

Toyota Field, San Antonio, Texas
Attendance: 6,548
Referee: Ricardo Salazar

==== Soccer Bowl 2014 ====
November 15, 2014
8:30 pm EST

San Antonio Scorpions	2–1	Fort Lauderdale Strikers
Castillo 70'; Forbes 74'; Gentile (yellow card) 84'; Hassli (yellow card) 88'	Report; Report	Nuñez (penalty missed) 62' (pen.); Ramírez 79'

Toyota Field, San Antonio, Texas
Attendance: 7,847
Referee: Ted Unkel

== Attendance ==
Season	Spring Season Weekly Averages										
Season	ATL	CAR	EDM	FTL	IND	MN	NY	OTT	SA	TB	League avg.
**Week 1**	-	-	-	3,105	**11,048**	-	7,906	-	7,381	7,003	**7,289**
**Week 2**	5,000	4,007	4,399	-	**10,421**	-	-	3,457	-	-	5,457
**Week 3**	-	-	-	3,515	-	**5,287**	4,130	2,158	-	4,670	3,952
**Week 4**	3,922	4,066	3,276	-	-	4,913	-	-	**5,595**	-	4,354
**Week 5**	-	-	-	3,109	**10,285**	-	3,091	2,164	5,834	-	4,897
**Week 6**	-	5,527	-	-	**10,285**	5,325	-	-	7,087	4,855	6,616
**Week 7**	-	-	2,961	-	-	**6,784**	3581	2,432	-	4,331	4,018
**Week 8**	5,000	7,856	-	5,572	**10,285**	-	-	3,207	-	-	6,384
**Week 9**	5,000	-	3,641	-	-	-	**6,495**	-	6,484	4,132	5,150
**Spring Total**	18,922	21,456	14,277	15,310	**52,324**	22,309	21,622	13,418	32,381	24,991	237,010
**Spring Avg**	4,730	5,364	3,569	3,825	**10,465**	5,157	4,323	2,684	6,476	4,998	5,267
**Bold** denotes league's highest attendance for the week

Season	Fall Season Weekly Averages										
Season	ATL	CAR	EDM	FTL	IND	MN	NY	OTT	SA	TB	League avg.
**Week 1**	-	3,080	3,609	3,092	-	-	3,806	-	-	**3,896**	3,497
**Week 2**	3,011	-	-	-	10,555	7,287	-	**14,593**	6,958	-	8,481
**Week 3**	4,810	-	3,152	3,257	-	-	-	-	**7,884**	4,868	4,711
**Week 4**	-	4,294	2,849	2,648	10,285	**34,047**	4,649	-	-	-	**10,896**
**Week 5**	3,842	-	-	-	**10,285**	5,112	4,524	4,814	-	-	5,652
**Week 6**	-	3,140	-	-	-	5,420	-	4,277	**7,847**	4,273	4,209
**Week 7**	-	**4,666**	-	2,409	-	-	-	-	-	4,212	5,454
**Week 8**	-	-	3,111	-	**10,285**	-	3,928	4,206	5,734	-	4,755
**Week 9**	5,000	3,106	2,796	3,006	**10,659**	7,024	-	5,269	-	-	5,303
**Week 10**	-	-	-	-	-	**6,202**	3,626	-	5,594	4,340	5,761
**Week 11**	3,071	3,193	-	-	-	-	4,502	-	-	-	4,896
**Week 12**	3,062	5,593	4,392	3,112	-	-	-	5,094	**8,313**	4,313	5,568
**Week 13**	-	-	3,830	3,052	**10,285**	5,744	-	3,105	-	3,865	4,734
**Week 14**	-	-	-	-	-	-	6,225	-	**5,963**	-	5,009
**Week 15**	2,905	-	2,903	-	**10,285**	-	4,411	-	5,683	2,565	5,090
**Week 16**	3,061	4,179	-	5,756	**10,982**	5,817	-	3,935	-	-	5,989
**Week 17**	5,000	-	-	5,756	-	6,454	8,565	4,172	-	-	5,989
**Week 18**	-	6,460	3,035	5,505	-	-	-	-	**8,205**	6,377	5,914
**Fall Total**	33,762	37,621	29,677	37,593	**94,188**	83,107	44,236	44,651	62,181	38,669	505,685
**Fall Avg**	3,751	4,180	3,297	4,177	**10,465**	9,234	4,915	4,961	6,909	4,300	5,619
**Bold** denotes league's highest attendance for the week

== Statistical leaders ==
=== Top scorers ===
Rank	Player	Nation	Club	Goals
1	Christian Ramirez	USA	Minnesota United	20
2	Fafà Picault	HAI	Fort Lauderdale Strikers	12
3	Jaime Chavez	USA	Atlanta Silverbacks	9
3	Georgi Hristov	BUL	Tampa Bay Rowdies	9
3	Daniel Mendes	BRA	Minnesota United	9
3	Zack Schilawski	USA	Carolina RailHawks	9
7	Miguel Ibarra	USA	Minnesota United	8
7	Kléberson	BRA	Indy Eleven	8
9	Rafael Castillo	COL	San Antonio Scorpions	7
9	Lance Laing	JAM	Edmonton	7
9	Oliver	BRA	Ottawa Fury	7
9	Junior Sandoval	HON	Atlanta Silverbacks	7
9	Mads Stokkelien	NOR	New York Cosmos	7

=== Top assists ===
Rank	Player	Nation	Club	Assists
1	Billy Forbes	TCA	San Antonio Scorpions	7
2	Lance Laing	JAM	FC Edmonton	6
3	Shawn Chin	USA	Fort Lauderdale Strikers	5
3	Miguel Ibarra	USA	Minnesota United	5
3	Christian Ramirez	USA	Minnesota United	5
3	Kevin Venegas	USA	Minnesota United	5
7	14 players			4

== Individual awards ==
=== Monthly awards ===
Month	NASL Player of the Month			
Month	Player	Nation	Club	Link
April	Zack Schilawski	USA	Carolina RailHawks	3G
May/June	Christian Ramirez	USA	Minnesota United FC	3G 3A
July	Rafael Castillo	COL	San Antonio Scorpions	3G
August	Christian Ramirez	USA	Minnesota United FC	6G 1A
September	Miguel Ibarra	USA	Minnesota United FC	4G 1A
October/November	Christian Ramirez	USA	Minnesota United FC	4G

=== League awards ===
- Golden Ball (MVP): USA Miguel Ibarra (Minnesota United FC)
- Golden Boot: USA Christian Ramirez (Minnesota United FC)
- Golden Glove: John Smits (FC Edmonton)
- Coach of the Year: USA Manny Lagos (Minnesota United FC)
- Goal of the Year: USA Christian Ramirez (Minnesota United FC)
- Young (U24) Player of the Year: USA Christian Ramirez (Minnesota United FC)
- Humanitarian of the Year: GUY Chris Nurse (Fort Lauderdale Strikers)
- Fair Play Award: Tampa Bay Rowdies

NASL Best XI
Position	Players	Team
Goalkeeper	(United States) Jimmy Maurer	New York Cosmos
Defense	(Brazil) Tiago Calvano	Minnesota United FC
Defense	(United States) Justin Davis	Minnesota United FC
Defense	(United States) Darnell King	Fort Lauderdale Strikers
Defense	(United States) Carlos Mendes	New York Cosmos
Midfield	(United States) Miguel Ibarra	Minnesota United FC
Midfield	(Colombia) Rafael Castillo	San Antonio Scorpions
Midfield	(Jamaica) Lance Laing	FC Edmonton
Midfield	(Colombia) Walter Restrepo	San Antonio Scorpions
Forward	(Haiti) Fafà Picault	Fort Lauderdale Strikers
Forward	(United States) Christian Ramirez	Minnesota United FC
