= List of North American Soccer League coaches =

North American Soccer League (NASL) was a professional soccer league in the United States and Canada that is the 2nd Division of their respective soccer pyramids.

== List of coaches by club ==
The list of coaches includes everyone who has coached a club while they were in the NASL, whether in a permanent or temporary role. Interim coaches are listed only when they managed the team for at least one match in that period.

Name	Nationality	Club	From	Until	ref.
José Manuel Abundis	Mexico	Atlanta Silverbacks	2011	2011	
Alex Pineda Chacón	Honduras	Atlanta Silverbacks	2011	2012	
Eric Wynalda	United States	Atlanta Silverbacks	2012	2012	
Brian Haynes (footballer)	Trinidad and Tobago	Atlanta Silverbacks	2012	2013	
Eric Wynalda	United States	Atlanta Silverbacks	2014	2014	
Jason Smith	United States	Atlanta Silverbacks	2014	2014	
Alejandro Pombo	Uruguay	Atlanta Silverbacks	2014	2014	
Gary Smith	England	Atlanta Silverbacks	2015	2015	
Martin Rennie	Scotland	Carolina RailHawks	2009	2011	
Colin Clarke	England	Carolina RailHawks	2011	2018	
Dwight Lodeweges	Netherlands	FC Edmonton	2010	2010	
Harry Sinkgraven	Netherlands	FC Edmonton	2010	2012	
Colin Miller	Canada	FC Edmonton	2012	2017	
Daryl Shore	United States	Fort Lauderdale Strikers	2010	2013	
Günter Kronsteiner	Austria	Fort Lauderdale Strikers	2013	2014	
Marcelo Neveleff	Argentina	Fort Lauderdale Strikers	2015	2015	
Günter Kronsteiner	Austria	Fort Lauderdale Strikers	2015	2015	
Caio Zanardi	Brazil	Fort Lauderdale Strikers	2016	2016	
Juergen Sommer	United States	Indy Eleven	2013	2015	
Tim Regan	United States	Indy Eleven	2015	2015	
Tim Hankinson	United States	Indy Eleven	2015	2017	
José Luis Villarreal	Argentina	Jacksonville Armada FC	2014	2015	
Guillermo Ángel Hoyos	Argentina	Jacksonville Armada FC	2015	2015	
Eric Dade	United States	Jacksonville Armada FC	2015	2015	
Tony Meola	United States	Jacksonville Armada FC	2015	2016	
Mark Lowry	England	Jacksonville Armada FC	2016	2018	
Alessandro Nesta	Italy	Miami FC	2016	2017	
Manny Lagos	United States	Minnesota United FC	2010	2015	
Carl Craig	England	Minnesota United FC	2016	2016	
Marc Dos Santos	Canada	Montreal Impact	2009	2011	
Nick De Santis	Canada	Montreal Impact	2011	2011	
Giovanni Savarese	Venezuela	New York Cosmos	2012	2017	
Marc Dos Santos	Canada	Ottawa Fury FC	2013	2015	
Paul Dalglish	Scotland	Ottawa Fury FC	2015	2017	
Adrian Whitbread	England	Puerto Rico FC	2016	2017	
Marco Vélez	Puerto Rico	Puerto Rico FC	2017	2017	
Colin Clarke	England	Puerto Rico Islanders	2007	2011	
Adrian Whitbread	England	Puerto Rico Islanders	2011	2012	
Alen Marcina	Canada	Rayo OKC	2016	2016	
Gerard Nus	Spain	Rayo OKC	2016	2016	
Tim Hankinson	United States	San Antonio Scorpions	2012	2013	
Alen Marcina	Canada	San Antonio Scorpions	2013	2015	
Marc Dos Santos	Canada	San Francisco Deltas	2017	2017	
Paul Dalglish	Scotland	Tampa Bay Rowdies	2010	2010	
Perry Van der Beck	United States	Tampa Bay Rowdies	2010	2010	
Ricky Hill	England	Tampa Bay Rowdies	2011	2014	
Thomas Rongen	Netherlands	Tampa Bay Rowdies	2015	2015	
Stuart Campbell	Scotland	Tampa Bay Rowdies	2015	2018	
