= North American Soccer League Player of the Month =

The Player of the Month was a soccer award that recognizes the best North American Soccer League player each month of the season. The recipient was chosen by a panel of writers who covered the league. The award was first given in 2011, the North American Soccer League's inaugural season.

== Winners ==
Key
GK	Goalkeeper
DF	Defender
MF	Midfielder
FW	Forward

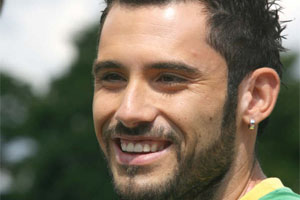
Etienne Barbara received the first two Player of the Month awards.

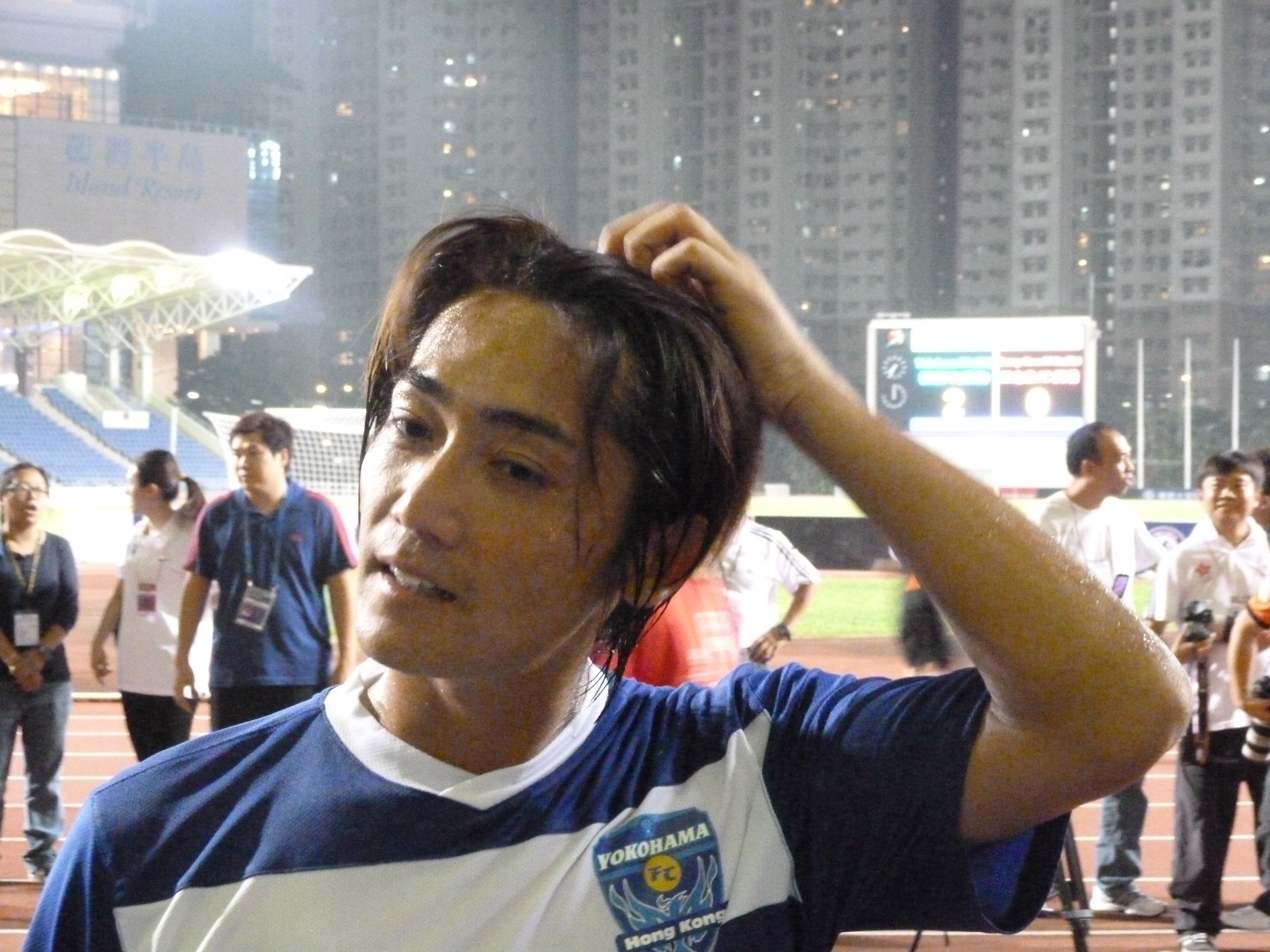
Tsuyoshi Yoshitake won the award in June 2012.

Month	Year	Nationality	Player	Team	Position	Ref
April	2011	Malta	Etienne Barbara	Carolina RailHawks	FW	
May	2011	Malta	Etienne Barbara	Carolina RailHawks	FW	
June	2011	United States	Matt Glaeser	Fort Lauderdale Strikers	GK	
July	2011	United States	Aaron King	FC Tampa Bay	FW	
August	2011	United States	Mike Ambersley	FC Tampa Bay	FW	
September	2011	United States	Evan Bush	Montreal Impact	GK	
October	2011	United States	Joe Warren	NSC Minnesota Stars	GK	
April	2012	Chile	Reinaldo Navia	Atlanta Silverbacks	FW	
May	2012	Canada	Shaun Saiko	FC Edmonton	MF	
June	2012	Japan	Tsuyoshi Yoshitake	Tampa Bay Rowdies	FW	
July	2012	Brazil	Pablo Campos	San Antonio Scorpions	FW	
August	2012	England	Richard Martin	Puerto Rico Islanders	GK	
September	2012	United States	Matt Horth	Atlanta Silverbacks	FW	
October	2012	United States	Jeff Attinella	Tampa Bay Rowdies	GK	
April	2013	England	Luke Mulholland	Tampa Bay Rowdies	MF	
May	2013	Italy	Simone Bracalello	Minnesota United	FW	
June	2013	Netherlands	Hans Denissen	San Antonio Scorpions	FW	
August	2013	Guyana	Chris Nurse	FC Edmonton	MF	
September	2013	Bulgaria	Georgi Hristov	Tampa Bay Rowdies	FW	
October	2013	England	Luke Mulholland	Tampa Bay Rowdies	MF	
April	2014	United States	Zack Schilawski	Carolina RailHawks	FW	
May/June	2014	United States	Christian Ramirez	Minnesota United	FW	
July	2014	Colombia	Rafael Castillo	San Antonio Scorpions	MF	
August	2014	United States	Christian Ramirez	Minnesota United	FW	
September	2014	United States	Miguel Ibarra	Minnesota United	MF	
October/November	2014	United States	Christian Ramirez	Minnesota United	FW	
April	2015	United States	Jimmy Maurer	New York Cosmos	GK	
May	2015	Spain	Raúl	New York Cosmos	FW	
June	2015	France	Romuald Peiser	Ottawa Fury	GK	
July	2015	United States	Christian Ramirez	Minnesota United	FW	
August	2015	Brazil	Stefano Pinho	Fort Lauderdale Strikers	FW	
September	2015	France	Romuald Peiser	Ottawa Fury	GK	
October	2015	Brazil	Stefano Pinho	Fort Lauderdale Strikers	FW	
April	2016	United States	Austin da Luz	Carolina RailHawks	MF	
May	2016	Senegal	Papé Diakité	FC Edmonton	DF	
June	2016	Libya	Éamon Zayed	Indy Eleven	FW	
July	2016	United States	Christian Ramirez	Minnesota United	FW	
August	2016	United States	Matt Van Oekel	FC Edmonton	GK	
September	2016	Argentina	Darío Cvitanich	Miami	FW	
April	2017	United States	Justin Braun	Indy Eleven	FW	
May	2017	United States	Zach Steinberger	Jacksonville Armada	MF	
June	2017	Italy	Vincenzo Rennella	Miami FC	FW	
July	2017	United States	Eric Calvillo	New York Cosmos	MF	
August	2017	Scotland	Jack Blake	Jacksonville Armada	MF	
September	2017	United States	Jaime Chavez	Miami FC	FW	
October	2017	Argentina	Emmanuel Ledesma	New York Cosmos	MF	

== Multiple winners ==
The below table lists those who have won on more than one occasion.

Rank	Player	Wins
1st	Christian Ramirez	5
2nd	Etienne Barbara	2
2nd	Luke Mulholland	2
2nd	Romuald Peiser	2
2nd	Stefano Pinho	2

== Awards won by position ==
Position	Wins
Forward	25
Midfielder	11
Goalkeeper	9
Defender	1

== Awards won by nationality ==
Country	Wins
United States	21
Brazil	3
England	3
Argentina	2
France	2
Italy	2
Malta	2
Bulgaria	1
Canada	1
Chile	1
Colombia	1
Guyana	1
Japan	1
Libya	1
Netherlands	1
Scotland	1
Senegal	1
Spain	1

== Awards won by club ==
Club	Wins
Minnesota United	8
Tampa Bay Rowdies	7
Carolina RailHawks	4
FC Edmonton	4
New York Cosmos	4
Fort Lauderdale Strikers	3
Miami FC	3
San Antonio Scorpions	3
Atlanta Silverbacks	2
Indy Eleven	2
Jacksonville Armada	2
Ottawa Fury	2
Montreal Impact	1
Puerto Rico Islanders	1
