= Ronaldo Vieira =

Ronaldo Vieira may refer to

- Ronaldo Vieira (Brazilian footballer) (born 1990), Brazilian footballer currently playing for the Fort Lauderdale Strikers
- Ronaldo Vieira (footballer, born 1998) Bissau-Guinean footballer currently playing for U.C. Sampdoria
