= Mitchell Lopez =

American soccer player

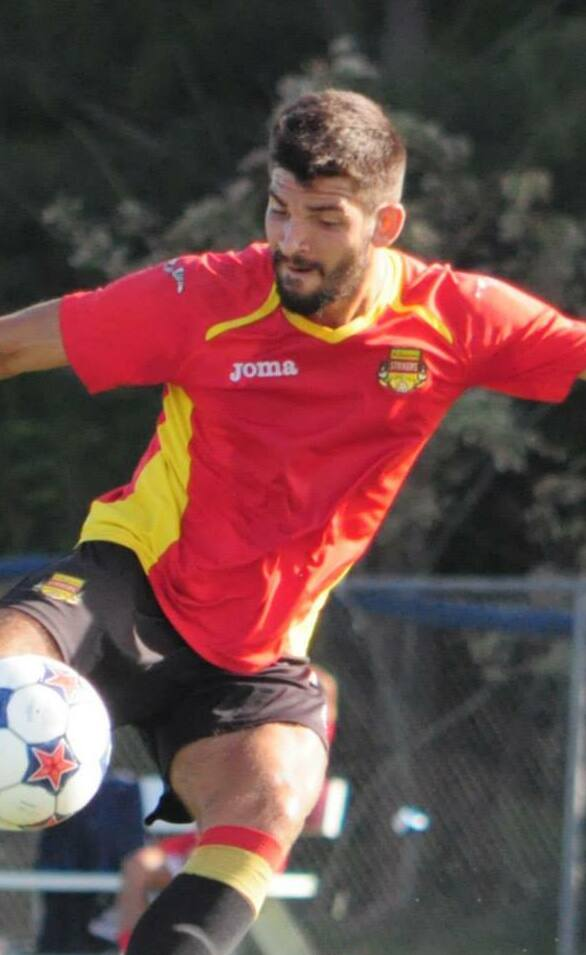
- Lopez in 2014

Personal information
- Date of birth: July 17, 1993 (age 33)
- Place of birth: Miami, Florida, United States
- Height: 1.83 m (6 ft 0 in)
- Position: Midfielder

Team information
- Current team: Boca Raton FC
- Number: 11

Senior career*
Years	Team	Apps	(Gls)
2014	Fort Lauderdale Strikers	1	(0)
2015	Ekerö IK	10	(1)
2016–2017	Bollklubben-46	32	(15)
2017	Extremadura UD B	1	(0)
- * Club domestic league appearances and goals as of 31 August 2017

Mitchell Lopez (born July 17, 1993) is an American former professional soccer player who played as a midfielder.

== Career ==
=== Early career ===
Born to a Brazilian mother and a Cuban father in Miami, Florida, Mitchell grew up in Florida. At the young age of 16, he moved to Montevideo and developed his football skills in the youth teams of C.A. Bella Vista. His first team experience came in 2011, at age 18, under the orders of the coach Julio César Ribas in Deportivo Maldonado before ultimately moving to South American giants C.A. Penarol.

=== Fort Lauderdale Strikers ===
On March 28, 2014, Lopez signed for the Fort Lauderdale Strikers of the North American Soccer League after starting in various pre-season matches against C.A. River Plate and the Chile national team and also scoring a memorable volley against FAU. “Mitchell is a very hard-working young man and shows a lot of promise,” said Strikers Head Coach Günter Kronsteiner in a press release.

In his first season with the Strikers, they reached the Final of the NASL, beating the first-place team of the regular season, Minnesota United FC in the semi-final before being defeated by the San Antonio Scorpions in the Championship final.

=== BK-46 ===
After a short spell in Sweden's renowned AIK, Mitchell signs with the top club of the Finnish kakkonen Bollklubben-46. As a midfielder, he manages 15 goals in 32 appearances, helping the club fight both seasons for promotion, falling just short.

=== Extremadura UD ===
A brief stint in Almendralejo saw Mitchell with Segunda División B title-contenders Extremadura UD under the direction of Agustin Izquierdo. In his first match for them, he started and played all 90 minutes in the 2017 Spanish Royal Federation Cup season opener.
