= Fafà Picault =

American-Haitian footballer (born 1991)

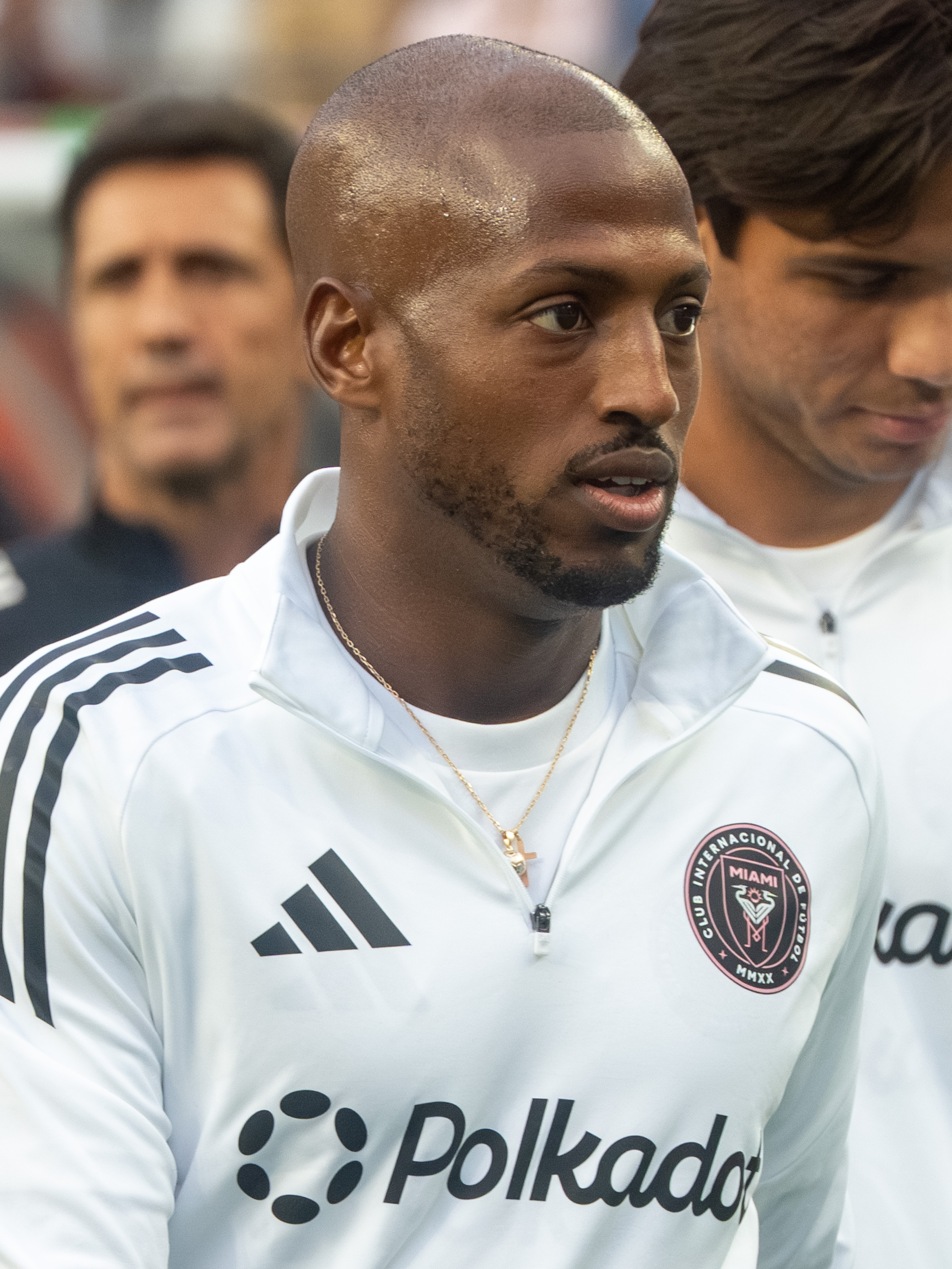
- Picault with Inter Miami in 2025

Personal information
- Full name: Fabrice Jean-Ian Picault
- Date of birth: 23 February 1991 (age 35)
- Place of birth: Manhattan, New York, US
- Height: 5 ft 8 in (1.73 m)
- Positions: Forward; winger

Team information
- Current team: Atlanta United
- Number: 22

Youth career
- 2006–2011: Cagliari

Senior career*
Years	Team	Apps	(Gls)
2012	Tampa Bay Rowdies	18	(0)
2014	Fort Lauderdale Strikers	22	(12)
2015	Sparta Prague	0	(0)
2015–2017	FC St. Pauli	22	(4)
2017–2019	Philadelphia Union	89	(21)
2020	FC Dallas	18	(3)
2021–2022	Houston Dynamo	61	(18)
2023	Nashville SC	27	(5)
2024	Vancouver Whitecaps	33	(9)
2025	Inter Miami	20	(4)
2026–	Atlanta United	23	(4)

International career^{‡}
2016–2018	United States	2	(0)
2023–	Haiti	22	(2)
- * Club domestic league appearances and goals as of 13:22, 15 November 2026 (UTC) ‡ National team caps and goals as of 17 November 2026

Fabrice Jean-Ian "Fafà" Picault (born 23 February 1991) is a professional footballer who plays as a winger for Major League Soccer club Atlanta United and the Haiti national team.

Born in the United States, he was initially called up by Haiti in 2014 for a friendly against Chile but did not make an appearance. Picault was then called up by the United States in 2016 before eventually switching back to represent Haiti in 2023.

== Early life ==
Picault was born to Haitian immigrants in New York City.

Picault comes from a multigenerational football lineage. His grandfather played for the Haiti national team, while his father Leslie played professional indoor soccer with the Philadelphia Fever in the MISL.

He grew up on the Upper West Side of Manhattan, near Riverbank State Park along the Hudson River, where he played his first game.

At the age of nine, his parents moved with him to Miami for a change of life. When he was sixteen, he moved to Italy to begin his youth career, where he learned Italian and connected with the culture.

== Club career ==
Picault started his career with the youth and reserve team of Italian club Cagliari, but later parted ways with the club after five years. He has commented on being subjected to frequent racism during his time in Sardinia.

=== Tampa Bay Rowdies ===
He later attended the NASL player combine in 2012 and impressed scouts working for Tampa Bay Rowdies and later signed a one-year deal with the club. Picault is known for his quickness and pace combined with his vision and technical abilities.

Prior to starting his career with the Rowdies, Picault suffered a broken foot bone causing him to be sidelined through the preseason and first month and a half of the regular season. He made his professional debut in a 3–2 victory against Atlanta Silverbacks on 19 May 2012. Making 18 appearances in league play, Picault helped the Rowdies win Soccer Bowl 2012, but would register no goals.

After the end of the 2012 NASL Season, the Rowdies declined the contract option for Picault.

=== Fort Lauderdale Strikers ===
He returned for a second spell in the NASL with the Fort Lauderdale Strikers ahead of the 2014 season. He made his debut for the Strikers on 12 April in a 2–0 win over Ottawa Fury. He scored his first goal for Fort Lauderdale on 26 April to help the Strikers to a 3–2 win over Indy Eleven. Picault would experience a breakout season with the Strikers, hitting 12 goals in 24 appearances during the 2014 season, second best in the NASL that season. The Strikers reached Soccer Bowl 2014, but ultimately lost to the San Antonio Scorpions.

=== Sparta Prague ===
In January 2015, Picault moved to Czech team Sparta Prague. He was released by Prague on 17 June 2015. He never made a league appearance for the club, but came on in the 84th minute in a Czech Cup match against Jablonec. During his stay with Sparta, Picault played mostly with the U21 side.

=== FC St. Pauli ===
In September 2015, Picault signed a one-year contract with German 2. Bundesliga club FC St. Pauli with the option of a one-year extension. He made his debut for St. Pauli on September 14 in a 2–0 win over MSV Duisburg, picking up an assist in the game. On 11 March 2016, Picault scored his first goal for St. Pauli in a 4–3 loss to SC Paderborn. He scored twice on 16 April to give St. Pauli a 2–0 win over VfL Bochum. He ended his first season in Germany with four goals and one assist from 16 appearances as he helped St. Pauli finish 4th in the table.

In April 2016, his contract was extended until June 2018.

In the 2016–17 Season, Picault made six appearances with one assist in league play as well as two appearances in the DFB-Pokal before being sold in the winter.

=== Philadelphia Union ===
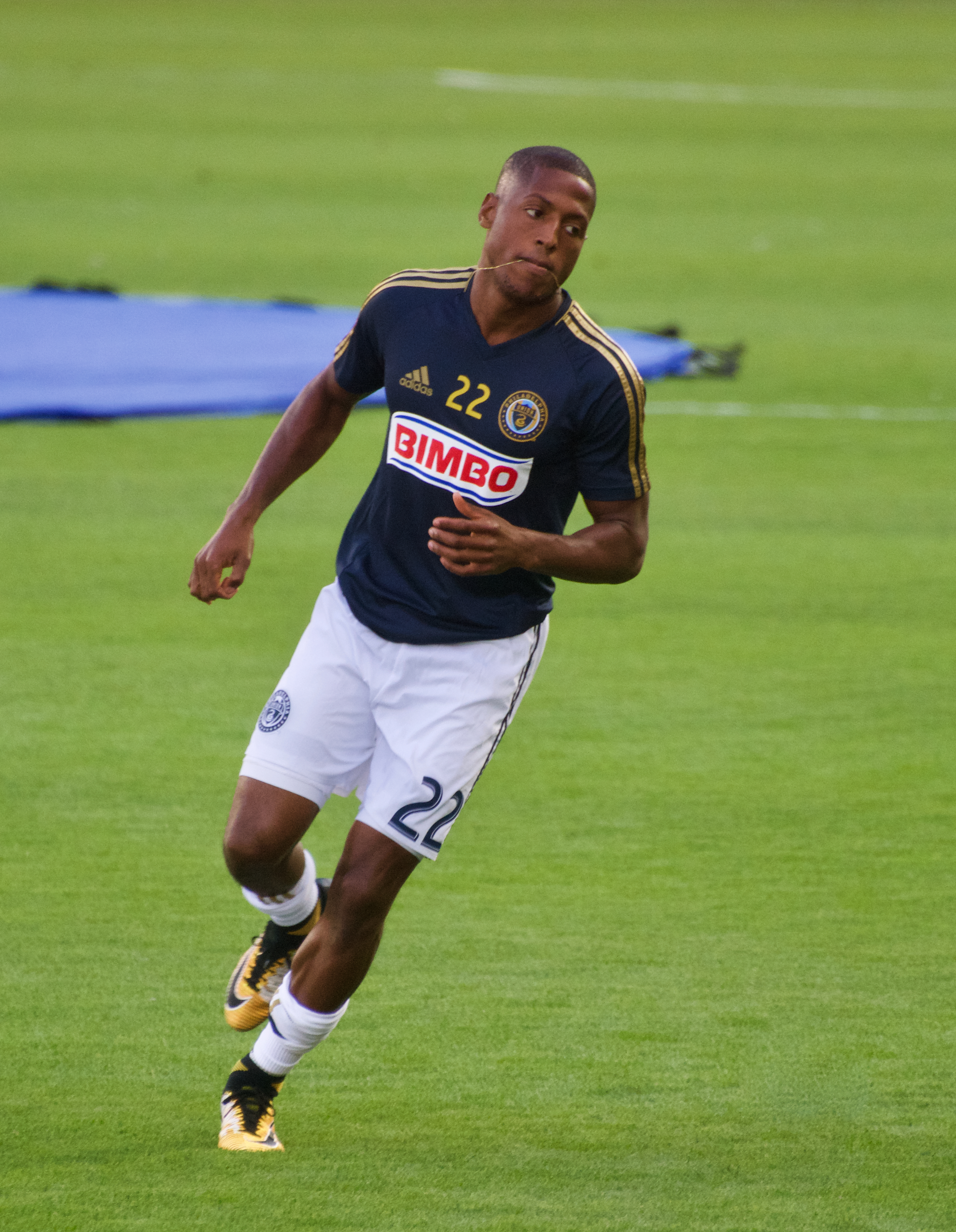
Picault warming up for the Union before a game in August 2017.

On 2 February 2017, Picault returned to the United States and signed with MLS side, Philadelphia Union. He made his MLS debut as a substitute in the Union's home opener against Toronto FC. In May 2017, Picault scored his first goal for the Union in a dominant 4–0 performance against D.C. United. In Philadelphia's next game, Picault scored again in a 2–0 win over the Houston Dynamo. On 22 October, in the final game of the regular season, he scored twice and had an assist as the Union defeated Orlando City SC 6–1, a performance that earned him a spot in the MLS Team of the Week. Picault ended the regular season with seven goals and three assists from 28 appearances, along with two appearances in U.S. Open Cup play. Despite a strong first season from Picault, the Union missed out on the playoffs after finishing 8th in the Eastern Conference.

Ahead of the 2018 season, Picault received a three-match suspension for offensive language exchanged with Pierre da Silva during a preseason, closed–door scrimmage with Orlando City SC. On 7 April, he made his first appearance of the season in Philly's 4th game, picking up an assist in a 1–1 draw with the San Jose Earthquakes. After the game, Picault was named to the bench for the MLS Team of the Week. He scored his first goal of the season on 2 June in a 3–1 loss to Atlanta United FC. On September 19, Picault scored three minutes into stoppage time to give the Union a 1–0 win against Seattle Sounders FC. He scored two goals and had one assist on 6 October to help the Union defeat Minnesota United 5–1, a performance that saw him named to the MLS Team of the Week. Picault ended the regular season with ten goals and five assists from 29 appearances, helping the Union qualify for playoffs. In Philadelphia's first game of the playoffs, Picault played the full game in a 3–1 loss to NYCFC. Picault also made four appearances and recorded one assist in Open Cup Play, helping the Union reach the final, where they lost 3–0 to the Houston Dynamo.

On 1 May 2019, Picault scored his first goal of the 2019 season in a 2–0 win over FC Cincinnati. During the regular season, Picault made 32 appearances, scored four goals, and recorded four assists as the Union finished 3rd in the Eastern Conference to qualify for the playoffs again. Facing off with the New York Red Bulls in Philly's opening game of the playoffs, Picault came off the bench and scored in the 78th minute to level the score at 3. He then got the assist on Marco Fabián goal in extra time as the Union won 4–3. In Philadelphia's next match, Picault got the start, but was unable to replicate his heroics as the Union lost 2–0 to Atlanta United.

=== FC Dallas ===
On 26 November 2019, Picault was traded to FC Dallas in exchange for $300,000 of 2020 General Allocation Money. He made his Dallas debut on 29 February in a 2–0 win over the Philadelphia Union. On 29 August, Picault scored his first goal for Dallas in a 3–2 win against Minnesota United FC. Two days later he was named to the MLS Team of the Week. On 31 October, Picault scored twice and picked up an assist to give Dallas a 3–0 win over the Houston Dynamo, a performance that saw him named to the Team of the Week for the second time of the season. In a shortened season due to the COVID-19 pandemic, Picault played in 18 of a possible 23 regular season games while scoring three goals and adding two assists. He helped Dallas finish 5th in the Western Conference and qualify for the playoffs. Picault started both of Dallas's playoff games as they reached the Conference Semifinals, where they lost 1–0 to Seattle Sounders FC.

=== Houston Dynamo ===
On 17 December 2020, Picault was traded to the Houston Dynamo, Dallas's Texas Derby rivals, in exchange for $275,000 of General Allocation Money, plus a potential $50,000 GAM in additional performance incentives. He made his Dynamo debut on 16 April, starting in a 2–1 win over the San Jose Earthquakes to open the season. On 8 May, Picault scored his first goal for Houston in a 1–1 draw against his former club, FC Dallas. He scored two goals on 11 September in a 3–0 win against Austin FC. His performance against Austin saw him named to the MLS Team of the Week. Picault ended the season with 31 appearances, 11 goals, and five assists. He was named Dynamo MVP and Dynamo Players' Player of the Year. Despite a good season for Picault, it was a poor year for Houston, finishing last in the Western Conference and missing out on the playoffs.

Picault scored his first and second goals of the 2022 season on 2 April, helping Houston to a 3–1 win against Inter Miami CF. He was named to the Team of the Week following the match. He scored another brace on 13 September as the Dynamo beat the New England Revolution 3–1, once again being included in the Team of the Week. Picault ended the regular season with 7 goals and 3 assists in 30 appearances as Houston finished 13th in the West, failing to qualify for the playoffs again.

=== Nashville SC ===
On 9 November 2022, Picault was traded to Nashville SC in exchange for $50,000 of 2023 General Allocation Money, $50,000 of 2024 GAM, and up to a conditional $150,000 in 2024 GAM. He would make 29 appearances and scoring 5 goals. He left Nashville following the 2023 season.

=== Whitecaps FC ===
Picault joined the Vancouver Whitecaps FC for the 2024 season. During the season he played 33 games for the club and scoring nine goals, before leaving at the end of the season as a free agent.

=== Inter Miami CF ===
Picault joined Inter Miami CF as a free agent starting in the 2025 season. He would make his debut for Inter Miami in the team's season-opening match against New York City FC on 24 February, which ended in a 2–2 draw, but came off with an injury just 16 minutes into the game. Picault scored his first goal for the team, the winning goal, in a 2–1 win at Atlanta United. At the end of the season on 6 December, Picault made the bench for Inter Miami's 3–1 win over the Vancouver Whitecaps to win their first MLS Cup. Five days later, Inter Miami announced that they had declined his contract option.

== International career ==
=== Early Haiti call-up ===
On 9 September 2014, Picault, along with Fort Lauderdale Strikers teammate James Marcelin, was called up to the Haiti national team to face Chile in an international friendly at Lockhart Stadium. He did not make an appearance.

=== United States ===
Picault was called up to the United States senior team for a 22 May 2016 friendly against Puerto Rico and made his debut in second half of that game. He won his second cap on 11 October 2018, in a friendly against Colombia.

=== Haiti ===
On 19 June 2023, Picault was included in Haiti's 23-man roster for the 2023 CONCACAF Gold Cup. Picault started and played 84 minutes in his debut in Haiti's 2–1 win over Qatar.

== Personal life ==
Picault has maintained a connection with his Haitian roots and holds passports from both the United States and Haiti.

Picault is also very fond of Haitian cuisine and music; he especially enjoys cooked plantain and his friends and cousin are even part of a Haitian band. He speaks seven languages, five in which he is fluent in: English, Creole, French, Italian and Spanish, while speaking a little Portuguese, and German.

During his time in Italy, he maintained close relationships with players who now play in the Serie A and has an Italian agent.

== Career statistics ==
=== Club ===
As of match played September 12, 2026

Appearances and goals by club, season and competition
Club	Season	League			Playoffs (Note: Includes NASL Playoffs and MLS Cup Playoffs)		National cup (Note: Includes U.S. Open Cup, Czech Cup, DFB-Pokal and Canadian Championship)		Continental (Note: Includes CONCACAF Champions League)		Other (Note: Includes Leagues Cup, FIFA Club World Cup)		Total	
Club	Season	Division	Apps	Goals	Apps	Goals	Apps	Goals	Apps	Goals	Apps	Goals	Apps	Goals
Tampa Bay Rowdies	2012	NASL	18	0	1	0	2	0	—		—		21	0
Fort Lauderdale Strikers	2014	NASL	22	12	2	0	0	0	—		—		24	12
Sparta Prague	2014–15	Czech First League	0	0	—		1	0	—		—		1	0
FC St. Pauli	2015–16	2. Bundesliga	16	4	—		0	0	—		—		16	4
FC St. Pauli	2016–17	2. Bundesliga	6	0	—		2	0	—		—		8	0
FC St. Pauli	Total		22	4	—		2	0	—		—		24	4
Philadelphia Union	2017	Major League Soccer	28	7	—		2	0	—		—		30	7
Philadelphia Union	2018	Major League Soccer	29	10	1	0	4	0	—		—		34	10
Philadelphia Union	2019	Major League Soccer	32	4	2	1	1	0	—		—		35	5
Philadelphia Union	Total		89	21	3	1	7	0	—		—		99	22
FC Dallas	2020	Major League Soccer	18	3	2	0	—		—		—		20	3
Houston Dynamo	2021	Major League Soccer	31	11	—		—		—		—		31	11
Houston Dynamo	2022	Major League Soccer	30	7	—		2	0	—		—		32	7
Houston Dynamo	Total		61	18	—		2	0	—		—		63	18
Nashville SC	2023	Major League Soccer	27	5	2	0	3	1	—		7	3	39	9
Vancouver Whitecaps FC	2024	Major League Soccer	29	9	4	0	2	0	2	0	3	1	40	10
Inter Miami	2025	Major League Soccer	20	4	0	0	—		3	0	5	0	28	4
Atlanta United	2026	Major League Soccer	18	3	2	1	—		—		—		20	4
Career total			319	78	16	2	17	0	5	0	15	4	393	84

=== International ===
As of match played 17 November 2026

Appearances and goals by national team and year
National team	Year	Apps	Goals
United States	2016	1	0
United States	2018	1	0
United States	Total	2	0
Haiti	2023	5	0
Haiti	2024	9	1
Haiti	2025	2	0
Haiti	2026	6	0
Haiti	Total	22	2
Career total		24	2

Scores and results list Haiti's goal tally first, score column indicates score after each Picault goal.

List of international goals scored by Fafà Picault
No.	Date	Venue	Opponent	Score	Result	Competition
1	14 October 2024	Trinidad Stadium, Oranjestad, Aruba	Aruba	4–2	5–3	2024–25 CONCACAF Nations League B
2	24 September 2026	Sabina Park, Kingston, Jamaica	Trinidad and Tobago	1–0	3–2	2026–27 CONCACAF Nations League A

== Honours ==
Tampa Bay Rowdies

- NASL Soccer Bowl: 2012

Inter Miami CF

- MLS Cup: 2025
- Eastern Conference (MLS): 2025

Vancouver Whitecaps

- Canadian Championship: 2024

Individual

- Dynamo Team MVP: 2021
- Dynamo Players' Player of the Year: 2021
