= Colin Murphy (footballer, born 1991) =

New Zealand footballer

Personal information
- Full name: Colin Albert Murphy
- Date of birth: 19 March 1991 (age 35)
- Place of birth: Hollywood, Florida, United States
- Height: 1.78 m (5 ft 10 in)
- Position: Midfielder

Youth career
- 2007–2008: Papatoetoe AFC

College career
Years	Team	Apps	(Gls)
2009–2012	Boston College Eagles		

Senior career*
Years	Team	Apps	(Gls)
2008–2009	Team Wellington	14	(1)
2012	Worcester Hydra	12	(0)
2014	Fort Lauderdale Strikers	5	(0)
2015	Auckland City		
2016–2018	Long Island Rough Riders	21	(2)

International career^{‡}
2007–2008	New Zealand U17		
2009–2011	New Zealand U20		
- * Club domestic league appearances and goals as of 22 July 2020 ‡ National team caps and goals as of 18 June 2014

Colin Murphy (born 19 March 1991) is a New Zealand footballer who last played for Long Island Rough Riders in the Premier Development League.

== Career ==
=== Youth and college ===
Murphy played four years of college soccer at Boston College between 2009 and 2012. He was a team captain his junior and senior years. A graduate of the Northfield Mount Hermon School, he was team captain and all New England there his senior year.

Murphy played for USL PDL club Worcester Hydra in 2012.

=== Professional ===
Murphy signed his first professional contract with NASL on 4 April 2014.
