= Jonathan Borrajo =

American soccer player (born 1987)

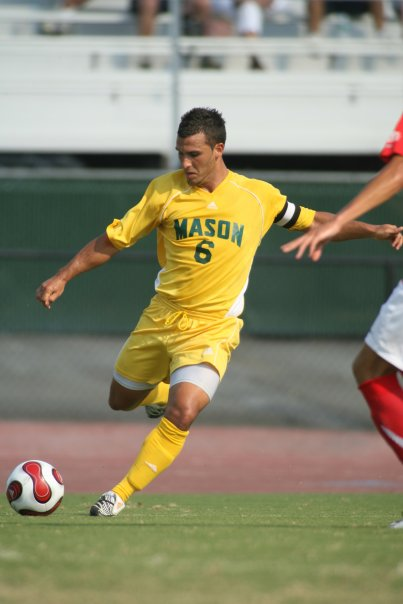

Personal information
- Full name: Jonathan Borrajo
- Date of birth: June 2, 1987 (age 39)
- Place of birth: Clifton, New Jersey, U.S.
- Height: 5 ft 9 in (1.75 m)
- Positions: Wingback; defensive midfielder

Youth career
- 2006–2007: New York Red Bulls

College career
Years	Team	Apps	(Gls)
2005–2008	George Mason Patriots		

Senior career*
Years	Team	Apps	(Gls)
2009–2010	Real Maryland Monarchs	32	(0)
2010–2011	HamKam	36	(0)
2012	New York Red Bulls	10	(0)
2013	Mjøndalen	31	(0)
2014	San Antonio Scorpions	30	(0)
2015	Fort Lauderdale Strikers	13	(1)
2016–2017	Miami FC	41	(0)
2018	New York Cosmos	12	(0)
- * Club domestic league appearances and goals as of 18:07, 14 August 2018 (UTC)

Jonathan Borrajo (born June 2, 1987) is an American former soccer player.

== Career ==
=== Youth and college ===
Borrajo was born and raised in Clifton, New Jersey and attended Clifton High School, where he was named his team's Best Defender and MVP. He finished his high school career with 109 points (29 goals and 51 assists), and was named to the All-State and All-County teams as a junior and senior.

Borrajo played four years of college soccer at George Mason University, where he was named to the All-CAA and All-CAA Tournament team as a senior in 2008. He received the Fred Thompson MVP in 2007 and the Dennis Hamlet Defensive Player of the Year in 2007 and 2008, as well as captaining the team his sophomore thru senior years and leading them to a CAA Championship and an NCAA final tournament appearance in his last season.

During his college years Borrajo was a player for the New York Red Bulls' youth development system, and also played for the New Jersey Rangers in the USL Premier Development League.

== Club career ==
=== Real Maryland ===
Borrajo began his professional career in 2009 (while finishing his college degree) when he signed with the Real Maryland Monarchs in the USL Second Division, and made his professional debut on April 25, 2009, in Maryland's 3–2 opening day victory over the Bermuda Hogges. Despite being a rookie, Borrajo was named team captain and the only Monarchs player to appear in every minute of the 2009 season, and he was subsequently named to the 2009 USL Second Division All League First Team.

=== HamKam ===
After a season and a half with the Monarchs Borrajo relocated to Norway in August 2010 transfer window, when he signed to play with HamKam of the Norwegian Second Division. Borrajo played every game for HamKam at right-back since he debuted 8/21/2010 where he was named Man of the Match. In his first season in Norway Borrajo helped his club gain promotion to the Norwegian First Division. Borrajo returned to HamKam for the 2011 season and in his second season with HamKam Borrajo helped the club to a 6th-place finish as he started in 27 matches and contributed 10 assists.

=== New York Red Bulls ===
On January 5, 2012, it was announced that Borrajo had agreed to terms with New York Red Bulls of Major League Soccer. Borrajo made his league debut for New York on 21 July 2012 in a 2–0 win over the Philadelphia Union. On November 19, 2012, the Red Bulls announced it declined options for an additional 6 players, having released 4 a week earlier, with Borrajo included in the mix.

=== Mjøndalen IF ===
Borrajo made a return to the Norwegian First Division and signed for Mjøndalen IF after a season in Major League Soccer. Borrajo has been a regular at right wingback and helped the club reach the quarterfinals of the Norwegian Cup in which they lost 2–0 to Molde FK. Borrajo helped the club to a 4th-place finish as he played in 31 matches and contributed 10 assists.

=== San Antonio Scorpions ===
Borrajo signed with San Antonio Scorpions of the North American Soccer League (NASL) in March 2014. San Antonio Scorpions won the Fall Season Championship and also led the NASL with single-season all-time record for fewest goals against in modern NASL era. Borrajo and the Scorpions played in the semifinals against the New York Cosmos and won 2–1 in overtime. San Antonio Scorpions went on to win the NASL Soccer Bowl Championship Final 2–1 against the Fort Lauderdale Strikers and were crowned 2014 NASL Champions, it was the first championship in the club's history.

=== Fort Lauderdale Strikers ===
Borrajo was traded by San Antonio to Fort Lauderdale Strikers in exchange for future considerations in January 2015. Borrajo missed the Spring Season due to injury and returned the Strikers on 23/8/2015 when he made his official debut for the club in a 2–0 win in Edmonton. Borrajo went on to play 13 full matches for the Strikers and was an integral part of the club's success in reaching 4th place playoff spot in the league. The Strikers lost 2–1 in the semifinals to the New York Cosmos, the eventual champions of the 2015 NASL Championship. This was Borrajo's second consecutive NASL semifinal playoff appearance.

=== Miami FC ===
Borrajo signed with expansion Miami FC ahead of the club's NASL debut in the 2016 season. Borrajo was club captain and ended the season with the most assists on the team.

== Personal life ==
Borrajo was born to Spanish immigrant parents: Marilyn and Jose Borrajo. Borrajo has dual American and Spanish passports. He also has a younger brother who plays soccer.

Borrajo was the first college graduate in his family. He graduated with honors from George Mason University School of Management and earned a Bachelor of Science in accounting with a Minor in Economics.

Jonathan was married January 19, 2019 to Stephanie Longhi.

== Honors ==
=== Ham Kam ===
- Second Division, 4th Group 1st Place (Promoted to First Division): 2010

=== San Antonio Scorpions ===
- North American Soccer League NASL Soccer Bowl Championship (1): 2014
- North American Soccer League NASL Fall Championship (1): 2014

=== The Miami FC ===
- North American Soccer League NASL Spring Championship (1): 2017
- North American Soccer League NASL Fall Championship (1): 2017

=== Personal ===
- USL Second Division Defender of the Year Finalist: 2009
- USL Second Division All League First-Team: 2009
- USL Second Division Most Minutes Played (1,800): 2009
