= Darryl Gordon =

American soccer player

Personal information
- Date of birth: 17 March 1989 (age 37)
- Place of birth: Miami, Florida, United States
- Height: 1.70 m (5 ft 7 in)
- Position: Defender

Team information
- Current team: Miami United
- Number: 2

College career
Years	Team	Apps	(Gls)
2007–2010	Nova Southeastern Sharks	73	(11)

Senior career*
Years	Team	Apps	(Gls)
2009	Central Florida Kraze	16	(0)
2013–2014	SC Weiner Viktoria	8	(0)
2014	Fort Lauderdale Strikers	6	(0)
2015–	Miami United	0	(0)
- * Club domestic league appearances and goals as of August 15, 2014

Darryl Gordon (born March 17, 1989) is an American professional soccer player who last played as a defender for the Miami United in the National Premier Soccer League.

== Career ==
=== College and youth ===
Gordon played four years of college soccer at Nova Southeastern University between 2007 and 2010.

While at college, Gordon also appeared for USL PDL club Central Florida Kraze in 2009.

=== Professional ===
Gordon signed with Austrian club SC Wiener Viktoria in 2013. He was released in 2014, and signed with North American Soccer League club Fort Lauderdale Strikers on April 7, 2014.

In 2015, Gordan has signed with National Premier Soccer League club Miami United.
