= Lionel Brown (soccer) =

United States Virgin Islands soccer player (born 1987)

Personal information
- Date of birth: September 17, 1987 (age 39)
- Place of birth: Kingston, Jamaica
- Height: 1.80 m (5 ft 11 in)
- Position: Goalkeeper

Team information
- Current team: Helenites SC

College career
Years	Team	Apps	(Gls)
2007–2008	East Central Falcons		
2009–2011	Connecticut Huskies		

Senior career*
Years	Team	Apps	(Gls)
2012–2015	Fort Lauderdale Strikers	6	(0)
2016–2019	Miami FC	4	(0)
2020–	Helenites SC		

International career^{‡}
2019–	United States Virgin Islands	20	(0)
- * Club domestic league appearances and goals as of May 30, 2021 ‡ National team caps and goals as of 5 January 2024

Lionel Brown (born September 17, 1987) is a professional soccer player who plays as a goalkeeper. Born in Jamaica, he plays for the US Virgin Islands internationally.

== Career ==
Born in Kingston, Jamaica, Brown made his professional debut for the Fort Lauderdale Strikers on June 29, 2013, against the San Antonio Scorpions in which he started in goal as Fort Lauderdale lost the match 4–1.

After serving as Miami FC's backup goalkeeper since 2016, Brown made his first Miami FC appearance on April 15, 2018. He came on as a field player in the 88th minute, relieving defender Rhett Bernstein.

== International ==
He made his debut for the United States Virgin Islands national soccer team on March 22, 2019, in a CONCACAF Nations League qualifier against Anguilla, as a starter.

== Coaching career ==
Since 2019, Brown has been the soccer coach at South Broward High School in Fort Lauderdale, Florida. Whom won the FHSAA State Championship in 2024.

== Career statistics ==
=== Club ===
As of match played March 16, 2020

Appearances and goals by club, season and competition
Club	Season	League			Cup		Continental		Total	
Club	Season	Division	Apps	Goals	Apps	Goals	Apps	Goals	Apps	Goals
Fort Lauderdale Strikers	2012	North American Soccer League	0	0	0	0	—	—	0	0
Fort Lauderdale Strikers	2013	North American Soccer League	1	0	0	0	—	—	1	0
Fort Lauderdale Strikers	2014	North American Soccer League	1	0	1	0	—	—	2	0
Fort Lauderdale Strikers	2015	North American Soccer League	4	0	0	0	—	—	4	0
Fort Lauderdale Strikers	Total		6	0	1	0	0	0	7	0
Miami FC	2016	North American Soccer League	0	0	0	0	—	—	0	0
Miami FC	2017	North American Soccer League	0	0	0	0	—	—	0	0
Miami FC	2018	National Premier Soccer League	1	0	0	0	—	—	1	0
Miami FC	2019	National Premier Soccer League	3	0	0	0	—	—	3	0
Miami FC	2019–20	National Independent Soccer Association	0	0	0	0	—	—	0	0
Miami FC	Total		4	0	0	0	0	0	4	0
Career total			10	0	1	0	0	0	11	0

=== International ===
Appearances and goals by national team and year
National team	Year	Apps	Goals
United States Virgin Islands
United States Virgin Islands	2019	5	0
United States Virgin Islands	2020	0	0
United States Virgin Islands	2021	5	0
Total		10	0

== Honors ==
Miami FC

- National Premier Soccer League: 2018, 2019
