= Christian Ramirez (soccer, born 1991) =

American soccer player (born 1991)

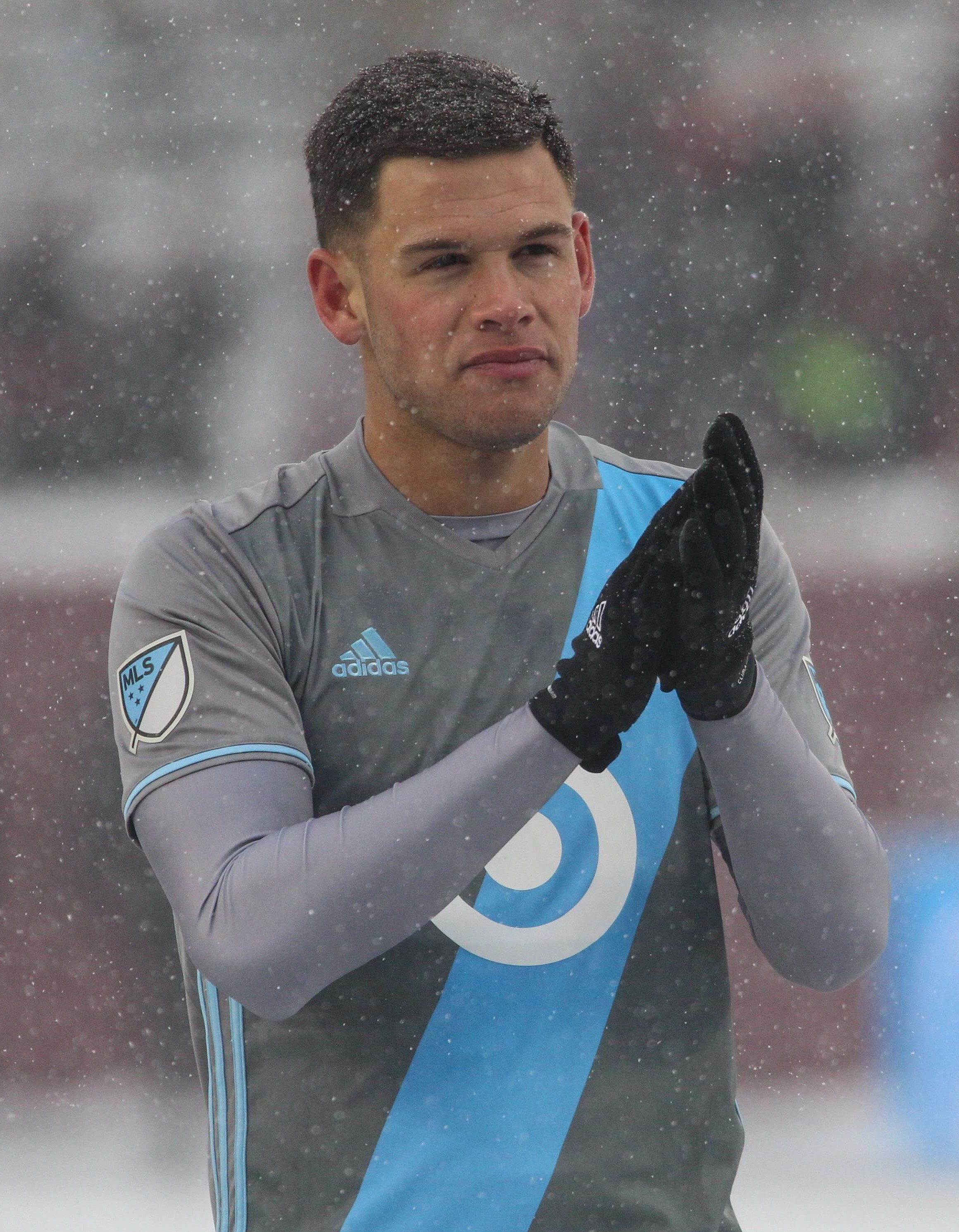
- Ramirez with Minnesota United FC in 2017

Personal information
- Full name: Christian Ramirez
- Date of birth: April 4, 1991 (age 35)
- Place of birth: Santa Ana, California, US
- Height: 6 ft 2 in (1.88 m)
- Position: Forward

Team information
- Current team: Austin FC
- Number: 21

Youth career
- Irvine Strikers

College career
Years	Team	Apps	(Gls)
2009–2010	UC Santa Barbara Gauchos	24	(1)
2011–2012	Concordia Eagles	42	(41)

Senior career*
Years	Team	Apps	(Gls)
2010–2012	Orange County Blue Star	27	(4)
2013	Charlotte Eagles	23	(8)
2014–2016	Minnesota United	88	(50)
2017–2018	Minnesota United	50	(21)
2018–2019	Los Angeles FC	24	(6)
2019–2021	Houston Dynamo	31	(8)
2021–2023	Aberdeen	45	(10)
2023–2024	Columbus Crew	55	(16)
2025–2026	LA Galaxy	25	(4)
2026–	Austin FC	30	(9)

International career^{‡}
2019	United States	2	(1)
- * Club domestic league appearances and goals as of 21:41, November 8, 2026 (UTC) ‡ National team caps and goals as of February 2, 2019

Christian Ramirez (born April 4, 1991) is an American professional soccer player who plays as a forward for Major League Soccer club Austin FC.

== Early life and education ==
Born in Santa Ana, California, Ramirez attended La Quinta High School in Westminster, California near his hometown of Garden Grove where he played center midfield and forward. As a freshman, he scored 17 goals and tallied 10 assists. During his sophomore year, he scored 18 goals and served eight assists. He opted not to play for the high school team during his junior and senior seasons. Ramirez played for the Olympic Development Program (ODP) and earned the Golden Boot award at the nationals in 2008 after the squad won the tournament. He was named team captain for three seasons.

Ramirez started his college career at UC Santa Barbara, playing in the midfield and as a defender. He appeared 24 times in two years, making two starts and scoring one goal Ramirez transferred to Concordia University Irvine, finishing his college career playing as a striker, scoring 44 goals and 18 assists in his two years at CUI. While at Concordia, Ramirez was named NAIA First Team All-American in 2012 while recording 23 goals and 6 assists and was also the GSAC 2012 Player of the Year. In 2011, Ramirez was named All-GSAC First Team and broke the school record for points in a game with five goals and three assists for 13 points against William Jessup. Ramirez tied the school single-season mark for points with 48 in 2011 and would go on to set the school record for points in a season with 52 in 2012.

== Career ==
=== Charlotte Eagles ===
In 2013, Ramirez signed with the Charlotte Eagles of the USL PRO. He made his debut for the squad in a match against Antigua Barracuda FC, in which he tallied his first professional goal and was named to the USL Pro Team of the Week. Ramirez finished the regular season with 8 goals and 5 assists. He continued his form into the postseason, scoring 4 goals in 3 playoff appearances and helping lead the Eagles to the USL Pro Championship, where they lost to Orlando City SC.

=== Minnesota United FC ===
On January 8, 2014, Minnesota United FC signed Ramirez for the 2014 NASL season. He became a first-choice striker after Pablo Campos suffered an injury in preseason, and went on to start every game, earning the NASL Player of the Week three times and the NASL Player of the Month three times.

Ramirez scored his 20th goal on the final game of the 2014 NASL season, equaling the league record held by Campos and Etienne Barbara. Ramirez won the 2014 NASL Golden Boot and the NASL Young Player of the Year award. Due to his performances, Ramirez was named in NASL's Best XI for 2014 and earned the same honor in both the 2015 and 2016 seasons. Ramirez again won the NASL Golden Boot in 2016 after tallying 18 goals in 31 appearances. Ramirez holds the club record for goals (53) for the now-defunct NASL version of Minnesota United.

With Minnesota United's move to Major League Soccer, Ramirez signed an MLS contract in January 2017. Ramirez scored the club's first-ever MLS goal on March 3 in a 5–1 loss at the Portland Timbers. He helped Minnesota earn their first point in league history on March 18, scoring once in a 2–2 draw at the Colorado Rapids. Ramirez scored twice on April 1 to help the Loons secure a 4–2 win over Real Salt Lake. Ramirez ended the season with 14 goals and 3 assists from 30 appearances, but Minnesota finished 9th in the Western Conference and failed to qualify for the playoffs.

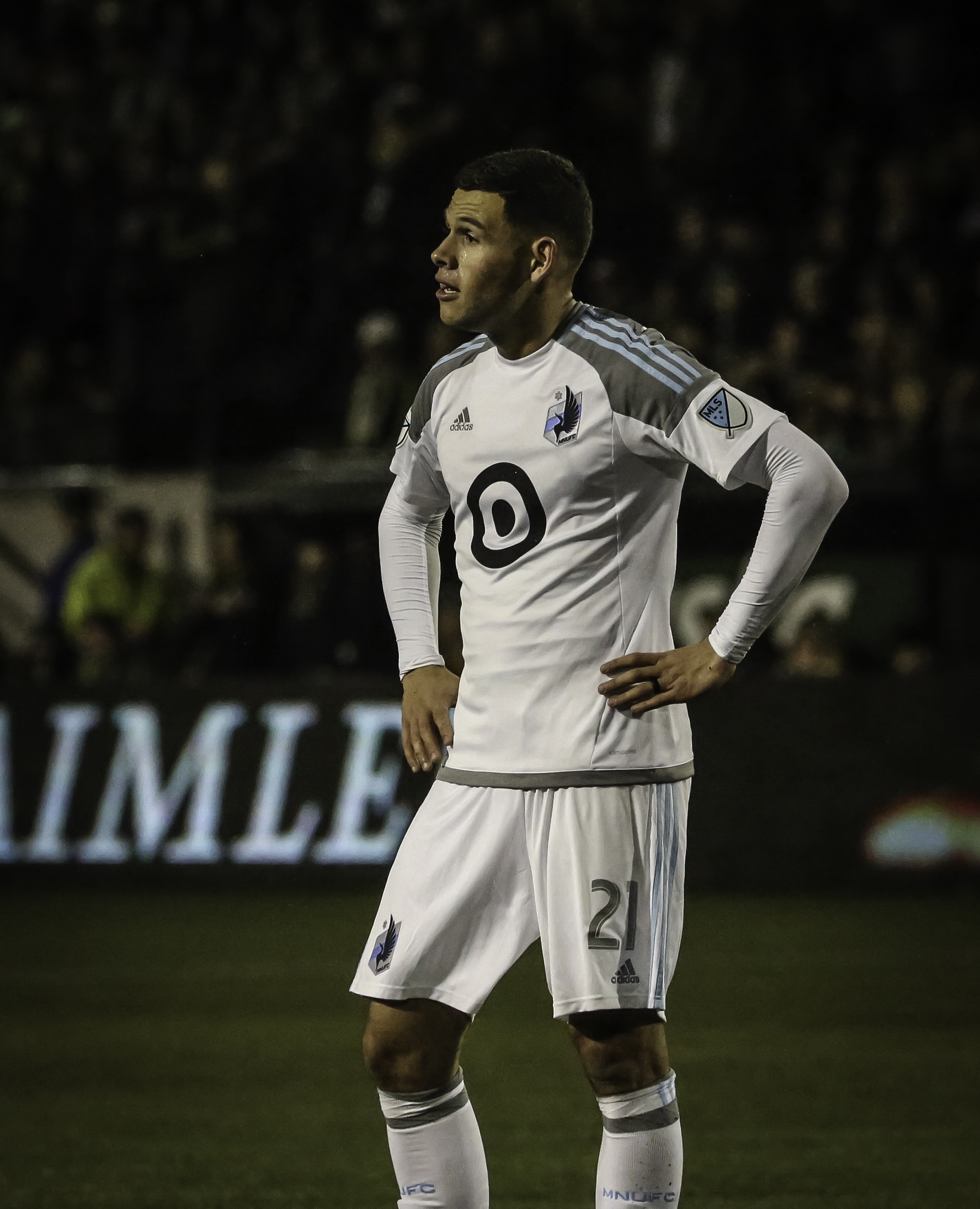
Ramirez playing for Minnesota in 2018

Minnesota opened the 2018 season with a 3–2 loss at the San Jose Earthquakes, with Ramirez picking up an assist. He scored his first goal of the season on April 22 in a 3–1 defeat to Seattle Sounders FC. Ramirez scored 3 times in a 5-game stretch between May 12 and June 23. On July 18, he scored once to help Minnesota to a 2–1 win over the New England Revolution. On July 22, Ramirez scored 2 goals and had one assist as the Loons beat LAFC 5–1.

=== Los Angeles FC ===
On August 6, 2018, Ramirez was traded to Los Angeles FC for $250,000 in General Allocation Money in 2018 and 2019, $100,000 in Targeted Allocation Money in 2018, $200,000 in Targeted Allocation Money in 2019, and up to $200,000 in future Allocation Money based on performance. Ramirez made his LAFC debut on August 11 and scored his first two goals for the team in a 2–0 win against Real Salt Lake on August 15. He finished his debut season for LAFC with eight appearances and three goals across all competitions.

During his second season with LAFC in 2019, Ramirez began the year as the team's starting striker due to Adama Diomande's injury. He scored his first goal of the season in the second matchweek against the Portland Timbers in a 4–1 victory. On July 3, 2019, Ramirez had a goal and an assist in a 5–1 win over Sporting Kansas City. During his partial second season with LAFC, Ramirez scored four goals from 20 appearances across all competitions.

=== Houston Dynamo ===
On August 7, 2019, Ramirez was traded to Houston Dynamo in exchange for $250,000 in allocation money. Ramirez made his Dynamo debut and scored his first goal for his new club on August 11 in a 2–1 loss to the Philadelphia Union. On September 11, the Dynamo hosted Ramirez's old team, Minnesota. He scored once as the Dynamo defeated the Loons 2–0. In the final game of the season, Ramirez scored twice, including the winner in the 83rd minute, to help Houston defeat the LA Galaxy 4–2. He enjoyed good form to end the year, scoring 5 and assisting 1 in his 10 games with the Dynamo. His good performances weren't enough to save the Dynamo's season however, with Houston failing to qualify for the playoffs.

After the first two games of the 2020 season, with Ramirez appearing off the bench in both, the season was paused for four months due to the COVID-19 pandemic. Houston returned to play in July with the MLS is Back Tournament, however Ramirez did not take part, leaving the "bubble" to be with his wife for the birth of their second child. He rejoined the team after the tournament and made his first start of the year on August 21 in a 0–0 draw with FC Dallas. On August 25, Ramirez scored once and added an assist as Houston won 5–2 at Sporting Kansas City. He found the back of the net again on September 9 to give Houston a 1–1 draw at the Colorado Rapids. In a shortened season due to COVID-19, Ramirez ended the season with 2 goals and 2 assists from 15 games, 8 of them being starts. It was another disappointing season for the Dynamo as a team, finishing bottom of the Western Conference and missing the playoffs again.

During the 2021 season, Ramirez only made 6 appearances before being transferred. He scored in his only start, a 3–1 loss at the Colorado Rapids on May 15.

=== Aberdeen ===
On June 28, 2021, Ramirez signed with Scottish Premiership side Aberdeen. Ramirez made his Aberdeen debut on July 22 in the new Europa Conference League where he scored in the 5–1 victory over BK Häcken of Sweden.

=== Columbus Crew ===
On January 19, 2023, Ramirez joined Major League Soccer club Columbus Crew on a two-year deal with an option for a third year. Ramirez scored one of the more memorable goals in Crew history when he found the back of the net in the 115th minute of the 2023 Eastern Conference Finals against Hell is Real derby opponent FC Cincinnati, ultimately sending Columbus to the MLS Cup.

=== LA Galaxy ===
On February 12, 2025, Ramirez was traded to the LA Galaxy in exchange for $250,000 in 2025 General Allocation Money and $250,000 in conditional 2026 General Allocation Money. On February 21, 2026, the opening day of the 2026 MLS season, LA Galaxy announced that they had waived Ramirez and bought out his contract.

=== Austin FC ===
On February 27, 2026, Ramírez was acquired by Austin FC after clearing waivers. On March 1, 2026, Ramírez made his debut as a substitute against DC United, scoring the only goal of the game. Ramírez scored his first away goal for the Verde and Black in a 3-3 draw against Toronto FC, once again as a substitute. Ramírez got his first goal contributions as a starter against St. Louis City FC, scoring and assisting in a 2-0 home victory.

== International career ==
On January 8, 2018, Ramirez received a call-up for the United States men's national soccer team for a friendly against Bosnia and Herzegovina. He made his first appearance as a substitute against Panama on January 27, 2019, along with scoring his first goal for the senior team.

== Personal life ==
Ramirez's father, Juan, is a Colombian former player, who immigrated to the United States before Christian's birth. Juan stopped pursuing his soccer career to move his family to California. Ramirez says one of his motivations for playing soccer is to "live out Juan's dream that he wasn't able to." He was raised in a Catholic home and is a Christian. Christian and his wife Valerie have three children together. Ramirez developed a strong friendship with fellow Californian and former Orange County Blue Star and Minnesota United teammate Miguel Ibarra. Ramirez and Ibarra were nicknamed "Superman" and "Batman" by the Minnesota fans.

== Career statistics ==
=== Club ===
As of matches played November 7, 2026

Appearances and goals by club, season and competition
Club	Season	League			National cup (Note: Includes U.S. Open Cup, Scottish Cup)		League cup (Note: Includes USL Pro play-offs, NASL play-offs, MLS Cup Playoffs, Scottish League Cup)		Continental (Note: Includes UEFA Conference League, CONCACAF Champions Cup)		Other		Total	
Club	Season	Division	Apps	Goals	Apps	Goals	Apps	Goals	Apps	Goals	Apps	Goals	Apps	Goals
Charlotte Eagles	2013	USL Pro	23	8	0	0	3	4	—		—		26	12
Minnesota United FC (NASL)	2014	North American Soccer League	27	20	2	1	1	0	—		—		30	21
Minnesota United FC (NASL)	2015	North American Soccer League	30	12	1	0	1	1	—		—		32	13
Minnesota United FC (NASL)	2016	North American Soccer League	31	18	2	1	—		—		—		33	19
Minnesota United FC (NASL)	Total		88	50	5	2	2	1	—		—		95	53
Minnesota United FC	2017	MLS	30	14	—		—		—		—		30	14
Minnesota United FC	2018	MLS	20	7	2	0	—		—		—		22	7
Minnesota United FC	Total		50	21	2	0	—		—		—		52	21
Los Angeles FC	2018	MLS	7	2	—		1	1	—		—		8	3
Los Angeles FC	2019	MLS	17	4	3	0	—		—		—		20	4
Los Angeles FC	Total		24	6	3	0	1	1	—		—		28	7
Houston Dynamo	2019	MLS	10	5	—		—		—		—		10	5
Houston Dynamo	2020	MLS	15	2	—		—		—		—		15	2
Houston Dynamo	2021	MLS	6	1	—		—		—		—		6	1
Houston Dynamo	Total		31	8	—		—		—		—		31	8
Aberdeen	2021–22	Scottish Premiership	36	10	2	2	1	0	6	3	—		45	15
Aberdeen	2022–23	Scottish Premiership	9	0	—		6	3	—		—		15	3
Aberdeen	Total		45	10	2	2	7	3	6	3	—		60	18
Columbus Crew	2023	MLS	30	8	2	1	5	2	—		3 (Note: Appearances in Leagues Cup)	2	40	13
Columbus Crew	2024	MLS	25	8	—		2	1	4	0	6 (Note: Five appearances and one goal in Leagues Cup, one appearance in Campeones Cup)	1	37	10
Columbus Crew	Total		55	16	2	1	7	3	4	0	9	3	77	23
LA Galaxy	2025	MLS	25	4	—		—		4	1	3	0	32	5
LA Galaxy	2026	MLS	–		—		—		1	0	—		1	0
LA Galaxy	Total		25	4	—		—		5	1	3	0	33	5
Austin FC	2026	MLS	30	9	0	0	0	0	—		3	0	33	9
Career total			372	128	14	5	20	13	15	41	15	3	435	156

=== International ===
As of November 14, 2020

National Team	Year	Apps	Goals
United States	2019	2	1
Total		2	1

Scores and results list United States' goal tally first.

No	Date	Venue	Opponent	Score	Result	Competition
1.	January 27, 2019	State Farm Stadium, Glendale, United States	Panama	3–0	3–0	Friendly

Source: U.S. Soccer

== Honors ==
Minnesota United

- NASL Spring Season: 2014
- North American Supporter's Trophy: 2014

Columbus Crew

- MLS Cup: 2023
- Leagues Cup: 2024
- CONCACAF Champions Cup runner-up: 2024

Individual

- NASL Best XI: 2014, 2015, 2016
- NASL Golden Boot: 2014, 2016
- North American Soccer League Young Player of the Year: 2014
- NASL Player of the Month – May/June 2014, August 2014, October/November 2014, July 2015, July 2016
- NASL Player of the Week – Week 4 2016, Week 12 2016
