= Ronaldo Vieira (Brazilian footballer) =

Brazilian association football player

Personal information
- Full name: Ronaldo Vieira Jr.
- Date of birth: 10 August 1990 (age 36)
- Place of birth: Belo Horizonte, Brazil
- Height: 1.80 m (5 ft 11 in)
- Position: Midfielder

Youth career
- 2007–2009: Framingham High School

College career
Years	Team	Apps	(Gls)
2010–2011	Framingham State Rams	16	(5)
2012–2013	Sacred Heart Pioneers	30	(1)

Senior career*
Years	Team	Apps	(Gls)
2012	GPS Portland Phoenix	1	(0)
2012–2013	Western Mass Pioneers	15	(0)
2014	Fort Lauderdale Strikers	4	(0)
2016–2017	Boston City FC	21	(1)
- * Club domestic league appearances and goals

Ronaldo Vieira (born 10 August 1990) is a former Brazilian professional footballer who played as a midfielder.

== Career ==
=== College and Youth ===
Vieira played four years of college soccer, beginning at Framingham State University in 2010, before transferring to Sacred Heart University in the Spring of 2012.

While at college, Vieira also appeared for USL PDL club GPS Portland Phoenix in 2012 and Western Mass Pioneers in 2012 and 2013.

=== Fort Lauderdale Strikers ===
After taking part in an open tryout, Vieira signed his first professional contract with NASL club Fort Lauderdale Strikers on 10 April 2014.

On June 1, 2014, Vieira made his professional debut, replacing Iván Guerrero as a 76th-minute substitute during a 0–3 loss away to New York Cosmos. On July 26, 2014, Vieira made his first professional start, receiving a red card as the Strikers drew 1–1 against New York Cosmos. In addition to his four league appearances that season, Vieira appeared in a 2–3 loss to the Laredo Heat in the U.S. Open Cup.

== Personal life ==
In 2017, Vieira co-founded FC Flair, a Massachusetts youth futsal academy, with Bruno Bonicontro, a teammate from Boston City FC. He currently serves as Director of Operations.

Vieira is the head coach of the Beaver Country Day School boys varsity soccer team. In 2021, the team won the Eastern Independent League title.
