= Jason Smith (soccer) =

American soccer player and coach

Personal information
- Full name: Jason P. Smith
- Place of birth: Atlanta, United States

College career
Years	Team	Apps	(Gls)
- Kennesaw State Owls
- Truett McConnell Bears

Senior career*
Years	Team	Apps	(Gls)
1989–1990	Atlanta Express		
1990–1991	Georgia Steamers (indoor)		
1991	Atlanta Quicksilver		
1991–1992	Atlanta Lightning (indoor)		
1991–1992	Tulsa Ambush (indoor)		

Managerial career
- 1993–2005: Piedmont Lions
- 2005–2008: Atlanta Silverbacks
- 2010–2013: Pfeiffer Falcons
- 2014: Atlanta Silverbacks
- * Club domestic league appearances and goals

Jason Smith (born Atlanta) is a retired American soccer player and coach.

== Player ==
Smith attended Kennesaw State University and Truett-McConnell College where he was an honorable mention (third team) All American his sophomore season. He then spent six seasons in SISL, renamed the USISL in 1991, from 1989 to 1993. In 1989, Smith signed with the Atlanta Express. In 1990, he moved to the Georgia Steamers for the 1990–1991 SISL indoor season. The Steamers became the Atlanta Quicksilver for the 1991 SISL outdoor season and the Atlanta Lightning for the 1991–1992 SISL indoor season. In the fall of 1991, he joined the Tulsa Ambush of the National Professional Soccer League. The team lasted one season.

== Coach ==
In 1993, Smith became the head coach of both the men's and women's soccer teams at Piedmont College. Over the next twelve seasons, he compiled a combined 275-162-15 record. On June 13, 2005, the Atlanta Silverbacks of the USL First Division hired Smith as head coach. He coached the Silverbacks through the 2008 season. In 2010, Smith became the head coach of Pfeiffer University. In 2014, Smith again became the head coach of the Atlanta Silverbacks.
