= Rafael Castillo (footballer) =

Colombian footballer (born 1980)

Personal information
- Full name: Rafael Arlex Castillo Galvis
- Date of birth: June 6, 1980 (age 46)
- Place of birth: Pereira, Colombia
- Position: Midfielder

Youth career
- Deportivo Pereira

Senior career*
Years	Team	Apps	(Gls)
1996–1997	Deportivo Pereira		
2001–2002	Deportivo Pereira		
2002–2003	Atlético Nacional		
2003	Atlético Bucaramanga		
2004	Independiente Medellín		
2004–2005	Al-Ahly		
2005–2006	Deportivo Pereira		
2006–2007	Millonarios		
2007	Deportes Quindío		
2008–2009	Independiente Medellín	19	(2)
2010	Atlético Huila	35	(7)
2011	Deportes Tolima	17	(4)
2012	Real Cartagena	14	(2)
2013	Deportivo Pereira	14	(3)
2013	Llaneros	15	(3)
2014–2015	San Antonio Scorpions	43	(14)
2016–2019	San Antonio FC	68	(14)

International career
2001–2003	Colombia	9	(3)
- * Club domestic league appearances and goals as of 26 October 2019

Rafael Arlex Castillo (born June 6, 1980) is a Colombian footballer who plays as a midfielder. He previously played for the former San Antonio Scorpions of the NASL and the Colombia national football team between 2001 and 2003. He is known for his tenacious style of play despite his diminutive stature.

His past clubs include Real Cartagena (Colombia), Independiente Medellín (Colombia), Al-Ahly (Egypt) and Deportivo Pereira (Colombia).

== San Antonio Scorpions ==
Castillo was a mid-season acquisition for the Scorpions. He was brought in between the Spring and Fall 2014 North American Soccer League seasons and immediately started. He played attacking midfield for the Scorpions and helped lead the team to the 2014 NASL Championship. In only half a season, he led the team in goals scored for the entire year.

In the Soccer Bowl 2014, Castillo executed a stunning Bicycle kick to open the scoring. The San Antonio Scorpions would go on to win the game 2–1. Castillo's effort in the final also included an assist to Billy Forbes on a sublime through-ball that split the defense.

He remained with San Antonio until the club ceased operations in December 2015.

== San Antonio FC ==
Castillo signed with 2016 USL expansion club, San Antonio FC on February 4, 2016.

== Honours ==
Independiente Medellín

- Categoría Primera A: 2004-I,

Al Ahly

- Egyptian Premier League: 2004–05

2009-II

- MVP Soccer Bowl: 2014
