= Mark Anderson (footballer, born 1989) =

English association footballer

Personal information
- Full name: Mark Thomas Anderson
- Date of birth: 13 February 1989 (age 37)
- Place of birth: Pelton, County Durham, England
- Position: Attacking midfielder

Team information
- Current team: Spennymoor Town

Youth career
- 1999–2005: Sunderland
- 2008–2011: Barry Buccaneers

Senior career*
Years	Team	Apps	(Gls)
2010	Baton Rouge Capitals	11	(3)
2012–2014	Fort Lauderdale Strikers	48	(12)
2015–2016	Carolina RailHawks	11	(1)
2016–	Spennymoor Town	100	(23)
2021	→ Marske United (loan)	1	(0)
- * Club domestic league appearances and goals as of 17:07, 19 December 2021

Mark Anderson (born 13 February 1989) is an English footballer who plays as an attacking midfielder for Spennymoor Town.

== College and amateur career ==
=== Barry University ===
Anderson played college soccer at Barry University in Miami Shores, Florida. As a freshman, he recorded 11 goals and 11 assists, leading the nation in assists per game.

Among other honors, Anderson was named 2011 Daktronics DII National Soccer Player of the Year and 2011 Capital One Academic All-America of the Year for DII men's soccer.

=== Baton Rouge Capitals ===
After his sophomore season at Barry, Anderson joined PDL side Baton Rouge Capitals. He helped the Capitals to a second-place finish in the Southeast Division and a run to the Semifinal round of playoffs.

== Professional career ==
=== Fort Lauderdale Strikers ===
Anderson participated in the 2012 NASL Combine where he was picked up by the Fort Lauderdale Strikers. He was an integral part of the Strikers' unbeaten preseason, scoring three goals in the club's final three games. On 22 March 2012 the Strikers announced that Anderson had signed professional terms with the club. He chose the number 20 jersey, last worn by Gerson Mayen.

Anderson made his professional debut with the Strikers in the first match of the season as a second half sub against FC Edmonton on 7 April 2012. He scored his first professional goal in the Strikers 3–3 draw against the Carolina RailHawks at WakeMed Soccer Park with top-corner shot from outside of the box.

Since joining the Strikers, Anderson has scored several spectacular goals with both feet. He scored from inside his own half in the third round of the U.S. Open Cup in a match against the San Jose Earthquakes. On 2 June, he scored the winning goal from near the corner flag in a Florida Derby match against rivals Tampa Bay Rowdies.

On 30 July, Anderson recorded his first multiple goal game as a professional, scoring both goals in a 2–1 victory against the Carolina RailHawks. The goals were Anderson's sixth and seventh in the last seven NASL matches.

=== Carolina RailHawks ===
Anderson signed with NASL club Carolina RailHawks on 21 January 2015.

=== Spennymoor Town ===
Anderson signed with Spennymoor Town in his native country and county. In his first season, he helped them get promoted via the play-offs.

=== Marske United (loan) ===
On 19 November 2021, Anderson joined Northern Premier League Division One East side Marske United on a 28-day loan deal.

== Career statistics ==
=== Club ===
Statistics accurate as of 25 March 2013

Club	Season	League			Cup			Playoffs			Total		
Club	Season	Apps	Goals	Assists	Apps	Goals	Assists	Apps	Goals	Assists	Apps	Goals	Assists
Fort Lauderdale Strikers	2012	25	81	4	2	2	0	1	0	0	28	13	4
Fort Lauderdale Strikers	2013	18	63	8	2	4	0	—	—	—	20	15	8
Career total		43	22	12	4	6	0	1	0	0	48	24	12
