= Chris Nurse =

Guyanese footballer

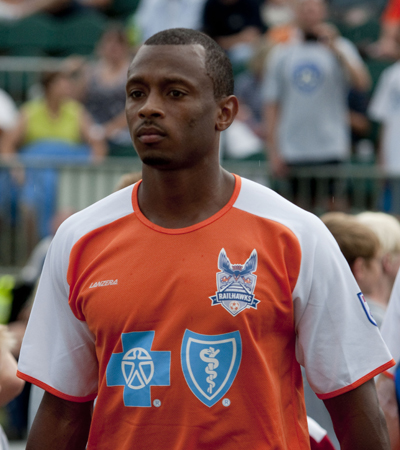

Personal information
- Full name: Christopher Ronald Nurse
- Date of birth: 7 May 1984 (age 42)
- Place of birth: Hammersmith, London, England
- Position: Attacking midfielder

Team information
- Current team: Miami United
- Number: 8

Youth career
- Kingstonian

Senior career*
Years	Team	Apps	(Gls)
2002–2003	Kingstonian	18	(1)
2003–2004	Sutton United	0	(0)
2004	Aldershot Town	1	(0)
2005–2006	Moor Green	29	(2)
2006–2007	Hinckley United	23	(3)
2007–2008	Tamworth	42	(9)
2008	Stevenage Borough	2	(0)
2008–2009	Halesowen Town	5	(0)
2009	Rochester Rhinos	22	(2)
2009–2010	AFC Telford United	12	(0)
2010	Puerto Rico Islanders	18	(2)
2011–2012	Carolina RailHawks	29	(1)
2012	Puerto Rico Islanders	5	(0)
2013	FC Edmonton	21	(4)
2014	Fort Lauderdale Strikers	16	(1)
2015	Carolina RailHawks	15	(0)
2016	Puerto Rico FC	14	(0)
2017–2018	Sutton United	0	(0)
2019	Miami United	7	(0)

International career^{‡}
2008–2016	Guyana	47	(5)

Managerial career
- 2018–2019: Tooting & Mitcham United (assistant)
- * Club domestic league appearances and goals as of 19 July 2020 ‡ National team caps and goals as of 17 June 2012

Christopher Ronald Nurse (born 7 May 1984) is an English-born Guyanese retired footballer who is an academy coach for Major League Soccer club Inter Miami.

== Career ==
=== Club ===
Nurse began his professional career in the English non-League system as a dynamic young midfielder who was a part of the youth academy at Kingstonian F.C before featuring for the reserve team & impressive displays during pre-season saw him rewarded with a place in the senior squad.

Nurse has extensive experience at multiple levels. He played for Aldershot & Stevenage Borough in the Conference National and almost won promotion from the Conference North with Hinckley United in 2006–07.

On 6 March 2009, the USL First Division team Rochester Rhinos announced the signing of Nurse to a one-year deal for the 2009 season. reaching the play-offs but were eliminated by the Puerto Rico Islanders.

In March 2010 the Puerto Rico Islanders completed the signing of Nurse to a one-year deal. Nurse played in the proceeding three CFU Club Championship matches and led the Islanders to become the 2010 CFU Club Championship Winners in Trinidad and Tobago. In July 2010 Nurse played for the Puerto Rico Islanders defeating the then MLS league leaders, Los Angeles Galaxy 5–3 on aggregate, which paved the way for their progression to the group stages of the CONCACAF Champions League for the third consecutive year. Nurse continued his strong performances leading Puerto Rico to the USSF Division 2 Pro League championship title defeating the Carolina Railhawks in the Playoff Final.

Nurse signed with Carolina RailHawks of the North American Soccer League on 7 March 2011. Nurse was part of a sensational season for the Railhawks, going on a 10-game win streak in a team that broke almost every existing club record and finishing top of the North American Soccer League winning the regular season title. He re-signed with Carolina for the 2012 season on 1 February 2012.

In January 2013 Nurse was signed by FC Edmonton after his previous club Puerto Rico Islanders folded and no longer continued to operate. In 2013 Nurse was selected 7 times onto North American Soccer League Team of the Week and selected North American Soccer League August Player of the Month. At the end of the season Nurse was Shortlisted for North American Soccer League 2013 Best XI and Voted 2013 FC Edmonton players MVP of the season by his teammates,

In January 2014 Nurse Signed with the Fort Lauderdale Strikers and was part of a talented squad that saw the team finish Runners- Up in the Soccer Bowl 2014. Nurse was nominated 2014 North American Soccer League Humanitarian of the Year Award for his work with the Breast Cancer Associations in South Florida.

Nurse was released by Puerto Rico at the end of their 2016 season.

=== Coaching ===
Nurse joined the academy coaching staff of Major League Soccer club Inter Miami in March 2023.

=== International ===
Nurse, who is of Guyanese descent, is a current International player for the Guyana national football team nicknamed the Golden Jaguars, despite having been born in England. In September 2011, Nurse was announced captain of the Guyana national football team for the 2014 FIFA World Cup qualification matches.

=== International goals ===
Scores and results list Guyana's goal tally first.

No	Date	Venue	Opponent	Score	Result	Competition
1.	7 October 2011	Barbados National Stadium, Saint Michael, Barbados	Barbados	2–0	2–0	2014 FIFA World Cup qualification
2.	11 September 2012	Providence Stadium, Providence, Guyana	El Salvador	2–2	2–3	2014 FIFA World Cup qualification
3.	22 March 2016	Providence Stadium, Providence, Guyana	Anguilla	2–0	7–0	2017 Caribbean Cup qualification

== Personal ==
As a young boy Nurse played Sunday league football for Wallington Wanderers Football Club and Carshalton Athletic alongside footballer Nigel Reo-Coker. From here Nurse progressed onto Kingstonian Football Academy, balancing full-time training with academic studies going onto complete a BTEC National Diploma in Sports Studies and completed a BSc (Hons) degree in applied sports therapy from 2005 to 2008 at University College Birmingham (the degree was awarded by Birmingham University).

Nurse's brother Jon played for English Football League Two side Dagenham & Redbridge and international football for Barbados.

During Nurse's time with the Puerto Rico Islanders he spearheaded a significant fund raiser for Susan G Komen Breast Cancer Foundation in memory of his mother and raised in excess of $6000. The team wore pink jerseys which were raffled after a home fixture.

== Honors ==
=== Kingstonian Football Club ===
- Surrey Senior Cup Runners Up: 2003

=== Sutton United Football Club ===
- Isthmian League Runners Up: 2003/04

=== Hinckley United ===
- Conference North Playoff Runners Up: 2006/07

=== Puerto Rico Islanders ===
- USSF Division 2 Pro League Champions: 2010
- CFU Club Championship Winner: 2010

=== Carolina Railhawks ===
- NASL Regular Season Champions: 2011

=== Fort Lauderdale Strikers ===
- North American Soccer League Soccer Bowl 2014 Runners-Up:
- North American Soccer League Humanitarian of the Year: 2014
