= Jenison (footballer) =

Brazilian association football player

Personal information
- Full name: Jenison de Jesus Brito e Brito
- Date of birth: 22 March 1991 (age 35)
- Place of birth: Tomé-Açu, Pará, Brazil
- Height: 1.83 m (6 ft 0 in)
- Position: Forward

Team information
- Current team: ABC Futebol Clube

Youth career
- Paysandu

Senior career*
Years	Team	Apps	(Gls)
2010	Paysandu	2	(0)
2011–2013	Atlético Paranaense	6	(0)
2013	→ Atlético Ibirama (loan)	12	(5)
2013	Bragantino	3	(0)
2014	Fort Lauderdale Strikers	17	(1)
2015	Tapajós	3	(0)
2016	PSTC	11	(4)
2016–2017	J. Malucelli	20	(5)
2017	Vila Nova	8	(1)
2018	Cuiabá	21	(7)
2019	Paraná	45	(14)
2020	Novorizontino	8	(3)
2020–2023	Cuiabá	73	(12)
2021	→ Novorizontino (loan)	14	(5)
2022–2023	→ Guarani (loan)	21	(2)
2023–	Novorizontino	0	(0)
- * Club domestic league appearances and goals as of 20:46, 20 September 2022 (UTC)

Jenison de Jesus Brito e Brito (born 22 March 1991), simply known as Jenison, is a Brazilian professional footballer who plays as a forward for Novorizontino.

== Career ==
Jenison started his career with Paysandu Sport Club before signing with top-flight club Atlético Paranaense and later had stints with Atlético Ibirama and Série B side Bragantino. He signed with NASL club Fort Lauderdale Strikers on 3 July 2014.
