= Shawn Chin =

American football player (born 1989)

Personal information
- Full name: Shawn Chin
- Date of birth: May 11, 1989 (age 37)
- Place of birth: Miami, Florida, United States
- Height: 1.77 m (5 ft 10 in)
- Positions: Midfielder; forward

College career
Years	Team	Apps	(Gls)
2007–2008	Boston College Eagles	35	(15)
2009–2010	South Florida Bulls	31	(16)

Senior career*
Years	Team	Apps	(Gls)
2010	FC Edmonton	18	(6)
2012	Minnesota Stars FC	15	(9)
2013	VSI Tampa Bay	24	(14)
2014–2015	Fort Lauderdale Strikers	53	(24)
2016–2017	San Antonio FC	33	(20)
2017	Colorado Springs Switchbacks	6	(2)
2018–2019	Miami FC	20	(14)

International career
2008	United States U20	4	(3)
- * Club domestic league appearances and goals as of November 9, 2019

Shawn Chin (born May 11, 1989) is an American professional soccer player.

== Personal ==
Shawn Chin is of Jamaican and Chinese descent. He was born and raised in Miami, Florida, and attended Felix Varela High School, where he was named Miami Player of the Year in 2007 as his school's leading scorer (58 goals), before going on to play two years of college soccer at Boston College. While at Boston College, he was named to the ACC All-Rookie team as a freshman in 2007, before transferring to the University of South Florida prior to his junior year.

== Professional career ==
=== FC Edmonton ===
Chin turned professional in 2010 when he signed with North American Soccer League side FC Edmonton. He made his professional debut on May 4, 2011, in a 2011 Canadian Championship game against Toronto FC, and scored his first professional goal on May 31 in a 4–0 win over FC Tampa Bay.

=== Minnesota Stars FC ===
After FC Edmonton, Chin signed with Minnesota Stars FC of the North American Soccer League, who went on to become the runners-up of the NASL.

=== VSI Tampa Bay ===
Chin joined VSI Tampa Bay FC of the United Soccer League shortly after leaving Minnesota Stars FC. He went on to score eight goals in 24 appearances as a right midfielder.

=== Fort Lauderdale Strikers ===
Chin was signed by Fort Lauderdale Strikers of the North American Soccer League immediately after VSI. He made over 50 appearances in 2 seasons becoming a top 5 modern era appearance holder for the club. Chin was an integral part of the club that finished runners-up in 2014 and 3rd place in 2015. In 2014, Chin tied for league lead in the assists category for the North American Soccer League and became the first signing for the 2015 season.

=== San Antonio FC ===
After Fort Lauderdale Strikers Chin signed with San Antonio FC of the United Soccer League in January 2016 as a forward. Chin played a key role in the clubs first 2 seasons in the league, as they are now regarded as a marquee organization.

=== Colorado Springs Switchbacks ===
On September 8, 2017, Chin moved to United Soccer League side Colorado Springs Switchbacks.

=== Miami FC ===
On March 5, 2018, Chin signed for Miami FC, ahead of their inaugural season. He made six appearances during the regular season as they went on to win the NPSL National Championship. In 2019, playing in all but one of the team's regular season games, Miami repeated as NPSL Champions, beating New York Cosmos on August 3, with Chin scoring the final goal in the 3–1 win.

Chin stayed with the team when it moved to the newly created National Independent Soccer Association in Fall 2019. He played in all of the team's regular season games including the NISA East Coast Championship, which Miami won 3–0 over Stumptown Athletic.

== International ==
Chin joined the United States U-20 national team for camp in 2008, and played against Guatemala and Honduras. He became tournament Champions with the US U-20, where he had 3 goals and an assist in four caps playing as a center mid. Chin also scored a key penalty in the finals to solidify the win.
