= Günter Kronsteiner =

Austrian association football manager

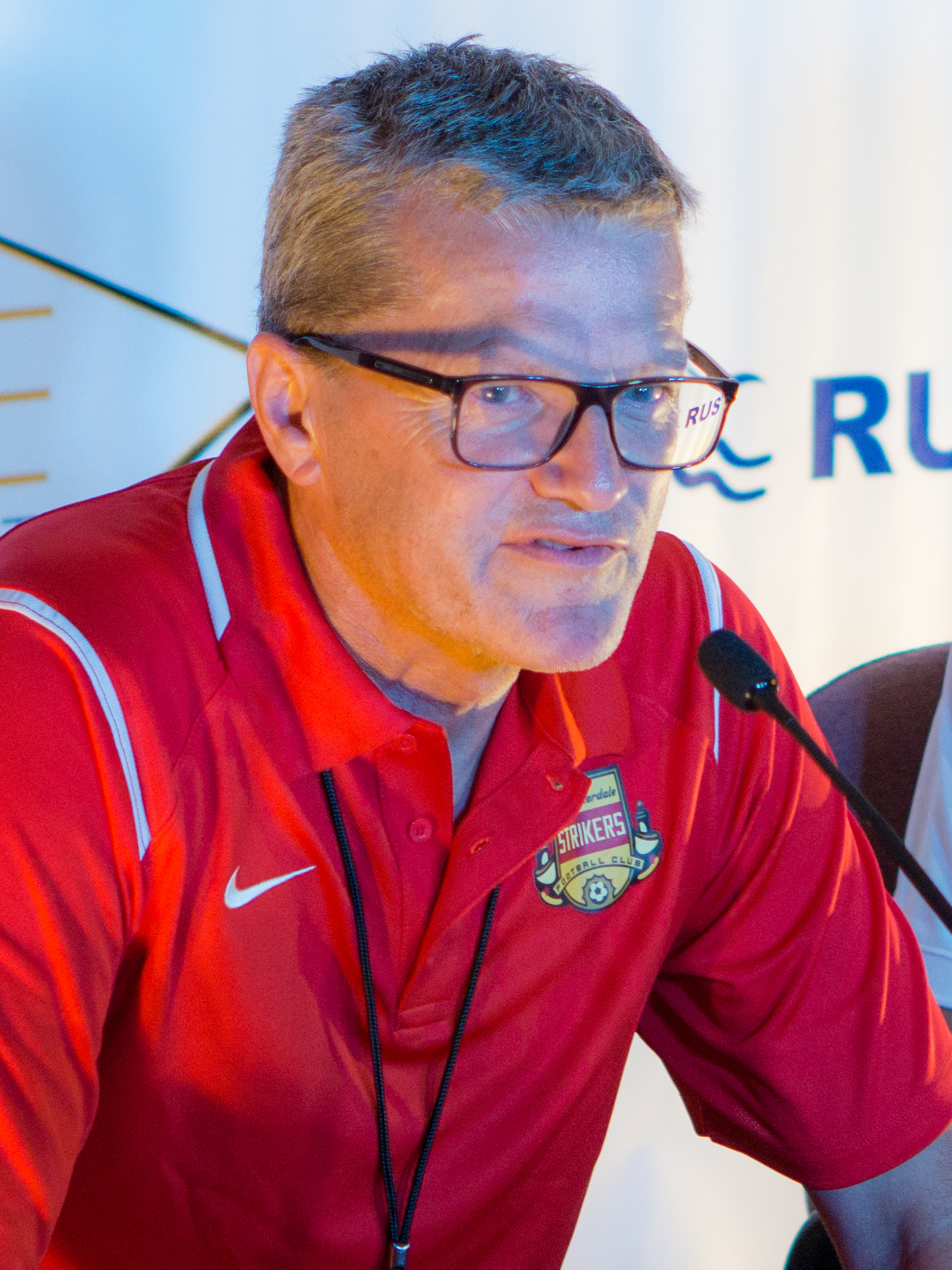
- Kronsteiner with Fort Lauderdale Strikers in 2015

Personal information
- Date of birth: 14 September 1953 (age 73)
- Place of birth: Austria
- Position: Midfielder

Senior career*
Years	Team	Apps	(Gls)
- DSV Leoben
- Wacker Innsbruck
- Red Bull Salzburg
- LASK Linz
- Rapid Lienz

Managerial career
- Rapid Lienz (Player-Coach)
- 1998–1999: DSV Leoben
- 2004–2005: Austria Vienna
- 2011–2013: Villacher SV
- 2013–2014: Fort Lauderdale Strikers
- 2015: Fort Lauderdale Strikers
- 2016–: 1. FC Tatran Prešov
- * Club domestic league appearances and goals

Günter Kronsteiner (born 14 September 1953) is an Austrian former footballer who was most recently head coach of the Fort Lauderdale Strikers in the American North American Soccer League, currently manager of Slovak 1. FC Tatran Prešov

== Playing career ==
During his playing career, Kronsteiner played as a midfielder with DSV Leoben, Wacker Innsbruck, Red Bull Salzburg, LASK Linz, and Rapid Lienz. While with Wacker, he won two Austrian Bundesliga titles and participated in the UEFA Cup.

== Post-playing career ==
After his playing days were over, Kronsteiner spent the majority of his time as a director of sports for Casino Salzburg, and FK Austria Vienna, where he had worked with and hired reputable names such as Hans Backe and Joachim Löw.

=== Fort Lauderdale Strikers ===
On 17 July 2013, it was announced that Kronsteiner had signed as the head coach of the Fort Lauderdale Strikers of the North American Soccer League. Despite leading the Strikers to a surprise Soccer Bowl appearance, the new team ownership announced Kronsteiner would not be returning for 2015.

Kronsteiner rejoined the Strikers as head coach on 30 June 2015. This came after head coach Marcelo Neveleff resigned after nine Spring Season games.

Gunter Kronsteiner is now in Slovakia.

== Statistics ==
=== Coach ===
Since 27 July 2013

Team	From	To	Record				
Team	From	To	G	W	D	L	Win %
(United States) Fort Lauderdale Strikers	17 July 2013	5 December 2014	27	11	7	9	40.74
(Slovakia) 1. FC Tatran Prešov	14 October 2016		0	0	0	0	—
Total			27	11	7	9	40.74
