= 2016 Rayo OKC season =

Rayo OKC
2016 season
- Owner: Raúl Martín Presa
- Head coach: Alen Marcina (until 1 August); Gerard Nus (from 1 August)
- Stadium: Miller Stadium
- NASL: Spring: 8 Fall: 4 Combined: 4
- U.S. Open Cup: Third Round vs Oklahoma City Energy
- Top goalscorer: Michel (15)
- Highest home attendance: 6,416 (Apr. 2 vs. Edmonton)
- Lowest home attendance: 926 (Sep. 11 vs. Jacksonville)
- Average home league attendance: League: 3,210; All: 3,288
Home colors	Away colors	Third colors

The 2016 Rayo OKC season was the club's only season of existence, during which they played in North American Soccer League, the second tier of the American soccer pyramid.

== Season events ==
Former San Antonio Scorpions head coach Alen Marcina was named Rayo head coach on January 7, 2016. Marcina resigned as manager on August 1, being replaced by Gerard Nus.

== Roster ==
As of match played 5 November 2016

No.	Name	Nationality	Position	Date of birth (age)	Signed from	Signed in	Contract ends	Apps.	Goals
Goalkeepers
21	Bryan Byars	(United States)	GK	2 October 1991 (age 35)	Oklahoma City Energy	2016		2	0
22	Daniel Fernandes	(Portugal)	GK	25 September 1983 (age 43)	(Netherlands) Twente	2016		32	0
Defenders
2	Rauwshan McKenzie	(United States)	DF	19 November 1986 (age 39)	Atlanta Silverbacks	2016		9	0
3	Moises Hernandez	(Guatemala)	DF	5 March 1992 (age 34)	loan from Dallas	2016	2016	26	1
5	Sebastien Ibeagha	(United States)	DF	21 January 1991 (age 35)	loan from Houston Dynamo	2016	2016	19	2
13	Hugo Rhoads	(United States)	DF	8 August 1994 (age 32)	Portland Pilots	2016		0	0
27	Kosuke Kimura	(Japan)	DF	14 May 1984 (age 42)	Atlanta Silverbacks	2016		34	0
98	Mamadou Danso	(The Gambia)	DF	27 April 1983 (age 43)	Carolina RailHawks	2016		33	4
Midfielders
6	Richard Menjivar	(El Salvador)	MF	31 October 1990 (age 36)	Tampa Bay Rowdies	2016		32	0
8	Tyler Gibson	(United States)	MF	12 January 1991 (age 35)	San Antonio Scorpions	2016		17	1
10	Sebastián Velásquez	(Colombia)	MF	11 February 1991 (age 35)	New York City	2016		16	1
11	Pecka	(Brazil)	MF	2 May 1989 (age 37)	Real Salt Lake	2016		21	2
14	Jarad van Schaik	(United States)	MF	11 December 1988 (age 37)	Charleston Battery	2016		19	0
18	Marvin Chávez	(Honduras)	MF	3 November 1983 (age 43)	San Antonio Scorpions	2016		15	1
20	Derek Boateng	(Ghana)	MF	2 May 1983 (age 43)	(Spain) Eibar	2016		29	0
23	Adrian Ables	(United States)	MF		DePauw University	2016		1	0
24	Yuma	(Spain)	MF	8 October 1985 (age 41)	(Spain) Puerta Bonita	2016		18	0
31	Michel	(Brazil)	MF	9 June 1981 (age 45)	Dallas	2016		29	14
Forwards
7	Billy Forbes	(Turks and Caicos Islands)	FW	13 December 1990 (age 35)	San Antonio Scorpions	2016		31	4
9	Georgios Samaras	(Greece)	FW	21 February 1985 (age 41)		2016		25	2
19	Ian Svantesson	(United States)	FW	31 August 1993 (age 33)	UAB Blazers	2016		7	1
49	Devon Sandoval	(United States)	FW	16 June 1991 (age 35)	loan from Real Salt Lake	2016	2016	813	1
55	Robbie Findley	(United States)	FW	4 August 1985 (age 41)	(Canada) Toronto	2016		22	4
Left during the season
1	Caleb Patterson-Sewell	(United States)	GK	20 May 1987 (age 39)	(Portugal) Gil Vicente	2016		0	0
4	Juanan	(Spain)	DF	27 April 1987 (age 39)	(Spain) Leganés	2016		8	0
5	Erick Norales	(Honduras)	DF	11 February 1985 (age 41)	Indy Eleven	2016		0	0
23	Ryan Johnson	(Jamaica)	FW	26 November 1984 (age 41)	(South Korea) Seoul E-Land	2016		4	1

=== Staff ===
- (Canada) Alen Marcina – Head Coach
- (United States) Dario Pot – Assistant Coach

== Transfers ==
=== Winter ===
In: Note: Flags indicate national team as defined under FIFA eligibility rules; some limited exceptions apply. Players may hold more than one non-FIFA nationality.

No.	Pos.	Nation	Player
1	GK	USA	Caleb Patterson-Sewell (from (Portugal) Gil Vicente)
2	DF	USA	Rauwshan McKenzie (from (United States) Atlanta Silverbacks)
3	DF	GUA	Moises Hernandez (loan from (United States) Dallas)
4	DF	ESP	Juanan (from (Spain) Leganés)
5	DF	HON	Erick Norales (from (United States) Indy Eleven)
6	MF	ESA	Richard Menjivar (from (United States) Tampa Bay Rowdies)
7	FW	TCA	Billy Forbes (from (United States) San Antonio Scorpions)
8	MF	USA	Tyler Gibson (from (United States) San Antonio Scorpions)
9	FW	GRE	Georgios Samaras
10	MF	COL	Sebastián Velásquez (from (United States) New York City)
11	MF	BRA	Pecka (from (United States) Real Salt Lake)
13	DF	USA	Hugo Rhoads (from (United States) Portland Pilots)
14	MF	USA	Jarad van Schaik (from (United States) Charleston Battery)
18	MF	HON	Marvin Chávez (from (United States) San Antonio Scorpions)
19	FW	USA	Ian Svantesson (from (United States) UAB Blazers)
20	MF	GHA	Derek Boateng (from (Spain) Eibar)
22	GK	POR	Daniel Fernandes (from (Netherlands) Twente)
23	FW	JAM	Ryan Johnson (from (South Korea) Seoul E-Land)
24	MF	ESP	Yuma (from (Spain) Puerta Bonita)
27	DF	JPN	Kosuke Kimura (from (United States) Atlanta Silverbacks)
31	MF	BRA	Michel (from (United States) Dallas)
55	FW	USA	Robbie Findley (from (Canada) Toronto)
98	DF	GAM	Mamadou Danso (from (United States) Carolina RailHawks)

Out: Note: Flags indicate national team as defined under FIFA eligibility rules; some limited exceptions apply. Players may hold more than one non-FIFA nationality.

No.	Pos.	Nation	Player

=== Summer ===
In: Note: Flags indicate national team as defined under FIFA eligibility rules; some limited exceptions apply. Players may hold more than one non-FIFA nationality.

No.	Pos.	Nation	Player
5	DF	USA	Sebastien Ibeagha (loan from (United States) Houston Dynamo)
21	GK	USA	Bryan Byars (from (United States) Oklahoma City Energy)
23	MF	USA	Adrian Ables (from (United States) DePauw Tigers)
49	FW	USA	Devon Sandoval (loan from (United States) Real Salt Lake)

Out: Note: Flags indicate national team as defined under FIFA eligibility rules; some limited exceptions apply. Players may hold more than one non-FIFA nationality.

No.	Pos.	Nation	Player
1	GK	USA	Caleb Patterson-Sewell (to (Portugal) Farense)
4	DF	ESP	Juanan (to (India) Bengaluru)
5	DF	HON	Erick Norales
23	FW	JAM	Ryan Johnson

== Friendlies ==
February 27, 2016 1	Rayo OKC	1–1	San Antonio FC	Dallas
CST	Michel	Summary	Palacios	Stadium: Mountain View College; Attendance: Closed-door

March 5, 2016 2	Rayo OKC	undisclosed	Saint Louis FC	Springfield
CST

March 12, 2016 3	Miami FC	1–0	Rayo OKC	Miami Gardens
10:00 a.m. CST	Martínez 28'			Stadium: St. Thomas University

March 19, 2016 4	Jacksonville Armada FC	1–3	Rayo OKC	Jacksonville
9:00 a.m. CST	Eloundou 56'; Ryan (yellow card) 74'	Report	Menjivar 19', 36'; Svantesson 87'	Stadium: Patton Park

== Competitions ==
=== NASL Spring season ===
==== Standings ====
Pos	Team	Pld	W	D	L	GF	GA	GD	Pts	Qualification
1	Indy Eleven (S)	10	4	6	0	15	8	+7	18	Playoffs
2	New York Cosmos	10	6	0	4	15	8	+7	18	
3	FC Edmonton	10	5	2	3	9	7	+2	17	
4	Minnesota United	10	5	1	4	16	12	+4	16	
5	Tampa Bay Rowdies	10	4	4	2	11	9	+2	16	
6	Fort Lauderdale Strikers	10	4	3	3	12	12	0	15	
7	Carolina RailHawks	10	4	2	4	11	13	−2	14	
8	Rayo OKC	10	3	3	4	11	12	−1	12	
9	Ottawa Fury	10	2	3	5	9	14	−5	9	
10	Jacksonville Armada	10	1	4	5	5	11	−6	7	
11	Miami FC	10	1	4	5	7	15	−8	7	

Source: NASL
Rules for classification: 1) points; 2) total goal differential; 3) total goals scored; 4) head-to-head record; 5) away goal differential; 6) away goals scored
(S) Spring season champion

==== Results summary ====
Overall								Home						Away					
Pld	W	D	L	GF	GA	GD	Pts	W	D	L	GF	GA	GD	W	D	L	GF	GA	GD
10	3	3	4	11	12	−1	12	1	1	3	5	7	−2	2	2	1	6	5	+1

Last updated: 11 June 2016.
Source: Match reports

==== Results by round ====
Round	1	2	3	4	5	6	7	8	9	10
Stadium	A	H	A	H	A	A	H	A	H	A
Result	D	L	W	L	W	D	L	L	W	D
Position	7	8	6	6	6	7	8	8	8	8

Updated to match(es) played on 14 June 2016. Source: Match reports
A = Away; H = Home; W = Win; D = Draw; L = Loss

==== Matches ====
April 2, 2016 1	Rayo OKC	0–0	Edmonton	Yukon, Oklahoma
19:00 CDT	Boateng (yellow card) 24'; Velásquez (yellow card) 34'	Summary	Watson (red card) 30'; Eckersley (yellow card) 67'; Ledgerwood (yellow card) 72'	Stadium: Miller Stadium; Attendance: 6,416; Referee: Nima Saghafi

April 9, 2016 2	Rayo OKC	2–3	Carolina RailHawks	Yukon, Oklahoma
19:00 CDT	Johnson 33'; Michel 52'; Kimura (yellow card) 90'	Report	da Luz 23', 90+6'; Hassan 74'; Beckie (yellow card) 85'	Stadium: Miller Stadium; Attendance: 5,851; Referee: David Gantar

April 22, 2016 3	Miami	2–3	Rayo OKC	Miami, Florida
19:00 CDT	Trafford (yellow card) 33'; Martinez 36'; Rezende (yellow card) 62'; Rusin 75'	Report	Findley 15'; Forbes 25'; Boateng (yellow card) 81'; Michel (yellow card) 81', (goal) 86' (pen.)	Stadium: FIU Stadium; Attendance: 2,168; Referee: Rubiel Vazquez

April 30, 2016 4	Rayo OKC	1–2	Indy Eleven	Yukon, Oklahoma
19:00 CDT	Michel 26'; Forbes (yellow card) 29'; Danso (yellow card) 69'	Report	Reinoso 7'; Ubiparipovic (yellow card) 9'; Paterson (yellow card) 44'; Vukovic 77'; Gordon (yellow card) 84'	Stadium: Miller Stadium; Attendance: 4,729; Referee: Alejandro Mariscal

May 7, 2016 5	Jacksonville Armada	0–1	Rayo OKC	Jacksonville, Florida
18:00 CDT		Report	Fernandes (yellow card) 53'; Findley 70'	Stadium: Baseball Grounds of Jacksonville; Attendance: 5,313; Referee: Marcos De Oliveira

May 14, 2016 6	Tampa Bay Rowdies	1–1	Rayo OKC	St. Petersburg, Florida
18:30 CDT	Juanan 74' (o.g.)	Report	Michel 54', (yellow card) 87'; Boateng (yellow card) 71'	Stadium: Al Lang Stadium; Attendance: 6,702; Referee: Caleb Mendez

May 21, 2016 7	Rayo OKC	1–2	Fort Lauderdale Strikers	Yukon, Oklahoma
19:00 CDT	Velasquez (yellow card) 28'; Michel 62' (pen.), (yellow card) 80'; Svantesson (yellow card) 68'; Boateng (yellow card) 73'	Report	Angulo 33'; PC (yellow card) 61'; Núñez 70'; Santos (yellow card) 77'	Stadium: Miller Stadium; Attendance: 3,712; Referee: Daniel Radford

May 28, 2016 8	New York Cosmos	1–0	Rayo OKC	Hempstead, New York
18:00 CDT	Szetela (yellow card) 41' (goal) 54'; Guenzatti (yellow card) 45+1'; Ockford (yellow card) 86'	Report	Samaras (yellow card) 20' (yellow-red card) 90+1'; Michel (red card) 36'; Boateng (yellow card) 45+1'; Forbes (red card) 89'	Stadium: James M. Shuart Stadium; Attendance: 4,068; Referee: José Carlos Rivero

June 4, 2016 9	Rayo OKC	1–0	Minnesota United	Yukon, Oklahoma
20:00 CDT	Pecka (yellow card) 50'; Gibson 70'	Report	Anor (yellow card) 56'	Stadium: Miller Stadium; Attendance: 4,118; Referee: Rosendo Mendoza

June 11, 2016 10	Ottawa Fury	1–1	Rayo OKC	Ottawa
18:00 CDT	Haworth 59'; Steele (yellow card) 88'	Summary	Svantesson 2'; Danso (yellow card) 83'	Stadium: TD Place Stadium; Attendance: 7,847; Referee: Justin Tasev

=== NASL Fall season ===
==== Standings ====
Pos	Team	Pld	W	D	L	GF	GA	GD	Pts	Qualification
1	New York Cosmos (F)	22	14	5	3	44	21	+23	47	Playoffs
2	Indy Eleven	22	11	4	7	36	25	+11	37	
3	FC Edmonton	22	10	6	6	16	14	+2	36	
4	Rayo OKC	22	9	8	5	28	21	+7	35	
5	Miami FC	22	9	6	7	31	27	+4	33	
6	Fort Lauderdale Strikers	22	7	5	10	19	28	−9	26	
7	Carolina RailHawks	22	7	5	10	25	35	−10	26	
8	Minnesota United	22	6	7	9	25	25	0	25	
9	Puerto Rico	22	5	9	8	19	31	−12	24	
10	Tampa Bay Rowdies	22	5	8	9	29	32	−3	23	
11	Jacksonville Armada	22	5	8	9	25	35	−10	23	
12	Ottawa Fury	22	5	7	10	23	26	−3	22	

Source: NASL
Rules for classification: 1) points; 2) total goal differential; 3) total goals scored; 4) head-to-head record; 5) away goal differential; 6) away goals scored
(F) Fall season champion

==== Results summary ====
Overall								Home						Away					
Pld	W	D	L	GF	GA	GD	Pts	W	D	L	GF	GA	GD	W	D	L	GF	GA	GD
22	9	8	5	28	21	+7	35	5	5	1	20	13	+7	4	3	4	8	8	0

Last updated: 15 September 2016.
Source: Match reports

==== Results by round ====
Round	1	2	3	4	5	6	7	8	9	10	11	12	13	14	15	16	17	18	19	20	21	22
Stadium	H	A	H	H	A	H	H	A	A	H	A	A	H	A	H	A	H	A	A	H	A	H
Result	D	W	D	W	L	W	D	D	L	L	L	L	W	D	D	D	W	W	W	W	W	W
Position	10	5	3	2	4	1	3	3	4	6	6	9	8	6	6	7	7	8	5	5	4	4

Updated to match(es) played on 2 August 2016. Source: Match reports
A = Away; H = Home; W = Win; D = Draw; L = Loss

==== Matches ====
July 2, 2016 1	Rayo OKC	1–1	Edmonton	Yukon
18:00 CDT	Findley 33' van Schaik (yellow card) 39'	Report	Gustavo (yellow card) 83' (goal) 90+3'	Stadium: Miller Stadium; Attendance: 4,257; Referee: Alex Chilowicz

July 10, 2016 2	Ottawa Fury	0–1	Rayo OKC	Ottawa
12:00 CDT	Steele (yellow card) 18'; Timbó (yellow card) 90+1'	Report	DeBellis 8' (o.g.); Pecka (yellow card) 22'; Boateng (yellow card) 49'	Stadium: TD Place Stadium; Attendance: 6,308; Referee: Pierre Lauziere

July 13, 2016 3	Rayo OKC	2–2	Puerto Rico	Yukon
20:00 CDT	Forbes (yellow card) 32'; Pecka (yellow card) 45+'; Velasquez 83'; Michel 90' (pen.)	Report	Ramos 34'; Rudy 55', (yellow card) 59'; Ferreira-Mendes (yellow card) 57'; Del Campo (yellow card) 74'	Stadium: Miller Stadium; Attendance: 3,531; Referee: Daniel Radford

July 16, 2016 4	Rayo OKC	3–0	New York Cosmos	Yukon
20:00 CDT	Kimura (yellow card) 28'; Michel 49', 65' van Schaik (yellow card) 84'; Pecka (yellow card) 85'; Boateng (yellow card) 87'; Samaras 90+4'	Report		Stadium: Miller Stadium; Attendance: 4,621; Referee: Tyler Ploeger

July 23, 2016 5	Puerto Rico	1–0	Rayo OKC	Bayamón
18:30 CDT	Ramos 53'; Paulo (yellow card) 66'; Culbertson (yellow card) 90+1'	Report	Hernández (yellow card) 72'; Forbes (yellow card) 90+1'	Stadium: Juan Ramón Loubriel Stadium; Attendance: 4,907; Referee: Kimball Ward

July 27, 2016 6	Rayo OKC	1–0	Tampa Bay Rowdies	Yukon
20:00 CDT	Kimura (yellow card) 24'; Forbes 43'	Report	Ramírez (yellow card) 21'	Stadium: Miller Stadium; Attendance: 3,413; Referee: Baboucar Jallow

July 30, 2016 7	Rayo OKC	2–2	Minnesota United	Yukon
20:00 CDT	Sandoval 60'; Boateng (yellow card) 61'; Hernandez (yellow card) 83'; Danso 90+3'	Report	Davis 71'; Jome (yellow card) 89'; Ramirez 90+2'	Stadium: Miller Stadium; Attendance: 3,512; Referee: Alex Chilowicz

August 7, 2016 8	New York Cosmos	1–1	Rayo OKC	Hempstead
16:00 CDT	Moffat 39' (pen.); Ayoze (yellow card) 55'; Maurer (yellow card) 57'	Report	Samaras 4'; Boateng (yellow card) 57'; Danso (yellow card) 90+1'; Hernandez (yellow card) 90+3'; Michel (yellow card) 90+4'	Stadium: James M. Shuart Stadium; Attendance: 2,871; Referee: Sorin Stocia

August 13, 2016 9	Indy Eleven	2–1	Rayo OKC	Indianapolis
18:30 CDT	Ring (yellow card) 11'; Mares 41'; Zayed (yellow card) 45+2'; Falvey 84'	Report	Danso 12'	Stadium: Michael Carroll Stadium; Attendance: 7,066; Referee: Marcos de Oliveira

August 20, 2016 10	Rayo OKC	1–2	Miami	Yukon
20:00 CDT	Findley 25'; Samaras (yellow card) 55'; Forbes (yellow card) 82'; Ibeagha (yellow card) 88'; Hernandez (yellow card) 90+1'	Report	Poku (yellow card) 77'; Campos 79'; Martínez 90+4'	Stadium: Miller Stadium; Attendance: 1,251; Referee: Victor Rivas

August 27, 2016 11	Tampa Bay Rowdies	2–0	Rayo OKC	St. Petersburg
18:30 CDT	Ramírez (yellow card) 12'; Cole 61', 70'; Chavez (yellow card) 77'	Report	Menjivar (yellow card) 9'; Boateng (yellow card) 39' van Schaik (yellow card) 45'; Samaras (yellow card) 77'	Stadium: Al Lang Stadium; Attendance: 4,935; Referee: Geoff Gamble

September 3, 2016 12	Minnesota United	1–0	Rayo OKC	Blaine
19:00 CDT	Ramirez 44'; Lowe (yellow card) 76'; Pitchkolan (yellow card) 90+4'	Report	Ibeagha (yellow card) 20'; Yuma (yellow card) 78'; Michel (red card) 88'	Stadium: National Sports Center; Attendance: 8,601; Referee: Daniel Radford

September 11, 2016 13	Rayo OKC	3–2	Jacksonville Armada	Yukon
19:00 CDT	Chávez (yellow card) 18', (goal) 25'; Yuma (yellow card) 31'; Ibeagha 58', (yellow card) 90+3'; Jerome 64' (o.g.)	Report	Ruthven 62'; Eloundou 90+3'	Stadium: Miller Stadium; Attendance: 924; Referee: Alex Chilowicz

September 14, 2016 14	Edmonton	0–0	Rayo OKC	Edmonton
20:00 CDT		Report	Chávez (yellow card) 34'; Menjivar (yellow card) 60'; Boateng (yellow card) 87'; Yuma (yellow card) 90+5'	Stadium: Clarke Stadium; Attendance: 1,568; Referee: Dave Gantar

September 18, 2016 15	Rayo OKC	1–1	Fort Lauderdale Strikers	Yukon
19:00 CDT	Boateng (yellow card) 22'; Hernandez (yellow card) 40'; Michel 84' (pen.); Yuma (yellow card) 90'	Report	Santos (yellow card) 32', (goal) 61'	Stadium: Miller Stadium; Attendance: 1,812; Referee: Jaime Herrera

September 24, 2016 16	Jacksonville Armada	1–1	Rayo OKC	Jacksonville
18:00 CDT	Eloundou 19'; George (yellow card) 23'; Lagerblom (yellow card) 25'	Report	McKenzie (yellow card) 87'; Michel 90+3' (pen.)	Stadium: Community First Park; Attendance: 3,472; Referee: Marcos De Oliveria

October 2, 2016 17	Rayo OKC	1–1	Carolina Railhawks	Yukon
18:00 CDT	Yuma (yellow card) 90+4'; Danso 90+4'	Report	Shipalane (yellow card) 23'; Watson 90+2'	Stadium: Miller Stadium; Attendance: 1,688; Referee: David Gantar

October 8, 2016 18	Miami	0–1	Rayo OKC	Miami
18:00 CDT	Smith (yellow card) 64'; Ryan (yellow card) 80' (red card) 89'	Report	Michel 71' (pen.); Hernandez (yellow card) 77'; Chávez (yellow card) 79'	Stadium: FlU Stadium; Attendance: 4,207; Referee: Alex Chilowicz

October 12, 2016 19	Carolina Railhawks	0–1	Rayo OKC	Cary
18:30 CDT	Albadawi (yellow card) 59'	Report	Yuma (yellow card) 28'; Menjivar (yellow card) 55'; Michel 82'	Stadium: WakeMed Soccer Park; Attendance: 3,308; Referee: Mark Kadlecik

October 16, 2016 20	Rayo OKC	3–1	Ottawa Fury	Yukon
18:00 CDT	Menjivar (yellow card) 26' van Schaik (yellow card) 32'; Michel 36', 84'; Forbes 61'; Boateng (yellow card) 72'	Report	Gentile 28'; Obasi (yellow card) 46'; Haworth (yellow card) 90+3'	Stadium: Miller Stadium; Attendance: 987; Referee: Rosendo Mendoza

October 22, 2016 21	Fort Lauderdale Strikers	0–2	Rayo OKC	Fort Lauderdale
18:00 CDT	Pineda (yellow card) 18'; Amauri (yellow card) 36'; Sandoval (yellow card) 53'; Núñez (yellow card) 70'; James (yellow card) 84'	Report	Velasquez (yellow card) 37'; Ibeagha 50'; Pecka 90+4'	Stadium: Lockhart Stadium; Attendance: 1,071; Referee: Luis Guardia

October 30, 2016 22	Rayo OKC	2–1	Indy Eleven	Yukon
18:00 CDT	Yuma (yellow card) 54'; Velasquez 61'; Chávez (yellow card) 71'; Hernandez 85'; Pecka (yellow card) 88'	Report	Franco (yellow card) 29'; Paterson 52' (pen.)	Stadium: Miller Stadium; Attendance: 1,043; Referee: Armando Villarreal

=== Combined Standings ===
Pos	Team	Pld	W	D	L	GF	GA	GD	Pts	Qualification
1	New York Cosmos (C, X)	32	20	5	7	59	29	+30	65	Championship qualifiers
2	Indy Eleven	32	15	10	7	51	33	+18	55	Championship qualifiers
3	FC Edmonton	32	15	8	9	25	21	+4	53	Championship qualifiers
4	Rayo OKC	32	12	11	9	39	33	+6	47	Championship qualifiers
5	Minnesota United	32	11	8	13	41	37	+4	41	
6	Fort Lauderdale Strikers	32	11	8	13	31	40	−9	41	
7	Miami FC	32	10	10	12	38	42	−4	40	
8	Carolina RailHawks	32	11	7	14	36	48	−12	40	
9	Tampa Bay Rowdies	32	9	12	11	40	41	−1	39	
10	Ottawa Fury	32	7	10	15	32	40	−8	31	
11	Jacksonville Armada	32	6	12	14	30	46	−16	30	
12	Puerto Rico FC	22	5	9	8	19	31	−12	24	

Source: NASL
Rules for classification: 1) points; 2) total goal differential; 3) total goals scored; 4) head-to-head record; 5) away goal differential; 6) away goals scored
(C) Champions; (X) Regular season champion

=== The Championship ===
November 5, 2016 Semi-Final	New York Cosmos	2–1	Rayo OKC	Hempstead
18:00 CDT	Arango 73', (yellow card) 77'; Orozco 90'; Duk (yellow card) 90+2'	Report	Danso 37'; Velasquez (yellow card) 42'; Kimura (yellow card) 64'	Stadium: Shuart Stadium; Attendance: 5,023; Referee: Jose Carlos Rivero

=== U.S. Open Cup ===
Rayo OKC will compete in the 2016 edition of the Open Cup.

June 1, 2016 Third Round	Rayo OKC	1–2 (a.e.t.)	Oklahoma City Energy	Yukon, Oklahoma
20:00 CDT	Juanan (yellow card) 40'; Forbes 43'; Boateng (yellow card) 115' (yellow-red card) 115'; Michel (red card) 119'	Report; Summary	Thomas (yellow card) 11'; Cuevas (yellow card) 36'; Dalgaard 45+'; Hyland 107'; Laurendi (yellow card) 119'	Stadium: Miller Stadium; Attendance: 4,385; Referee: Andrew Musashe

== Squad statistics ==
As of Match played 5 November 2016

=== Appearances and goals ===
No.	Pos	Nat	Player	Total		NASL Spring Season		NASL Fall Season		NASL Playoff		U.S. Open Cup	
No.	Pos	Nat	Player	Apps	Goals	Apps	Goals	Apps	Goals	Apps	Goals	Apps	Goals
2	DF	(United States) USA	Rauwshan McKenzie	9	0	4+1	0	1+3	0	0	0	0	0
3	DF	(Guatemala) GUA	Moises Hernandez	26	1	6	0	15+5	1	0	0	0	0
5	DF	(United States) USA	Sebastien Ibeagha	19	2	0	0	18	2	1	0	0	0
6	MF	(El Salvador) ESA	Richard Menjivar	32	0	8+2	0	14+6	0	1	0	1	0
7	FW	(Turks and Caicos Islands) TCA	Billy Forbes	31	4	7+1	1	18+3	2	1	0	1	1
8	MF	(United States) USA	Tyler Gibson	17	1	2+4	1	3+6	0	1	0	0+1	0
9	FW	(Greece) GRE	Georgios Samaras	25	2	3+4	0	10+6	2	1	0	1	0
10	MF	(Colombia) COL	Sebastián Velásquez	16	2	2+2	0	10+1	2	1	0	0	0
11	MF	(Brazil) BRA	Pecka	21	2	7	0	6+7	2	0+1	0	0	0
14	MF	(United States) USA	Jarad van Schaik	19	0	2+1	0	10+4	0	1	0	1	0
18	MF	(Honduras) HON	Marvin Chávez	15	1	2	0	8+4	1	0+1	0	0	0
19	FW	(United States) USA	Ian Svantesson	7	1	3+1	1	0+2	0	0	0	1	0
20	MF	(Ghana) GHA	Derek Boateng	29	0	9	0	16+3	0	0	0	1	0
21	GK	(United States) USA	Bryan Byars	2	0	0	0	2	0	0	0	0	0
22	GK	(Portugal) POR	Daniel Fernandes	32	0	10	0	20	0	1	0	1	0
23	MF	(United States) USA	Adrian Ables	1	0	0	0	0+1	0	0	0	0	0
24	MF	(Spain) ESP	Yuma	18	0	2+3	0	10+3	0	0	0	0	0
27	DF	(Japan) JPN	Kosuke Kimura	34	0	10	0	22	0	1	0	1	0
31	MF	(Brazil) BRA	Michel	29	14	8	5	19	9	1	0	1	0
49	FW	(United States) USA	Devon Sandoval	13	1	0	0	8+4	1	0+1	0	0	0
55	FW	(United States) USA	Robbie Findley	22	4	6+1	2	13+1	2	0	0	0+1	0
98	DF	(The Gambia) GAM	Mamadou Danso	33	4	10	0	21	3	1	1	1	0
Players who left Rayo OKC during the season:
4	DF	(Spain) ESP	Juanan	8	0	6+1	0	0	0	0	0	1	0
23	FW	(Jamaica) JAM	Ryan Johnson	4	1	3+1	1	0	0	0	0	0	0

=== Goal scorers ===
Place	Position	Nation	Number	Name	NASL Spring Season	NASL Fall Season	NASL Playoff	U.S. Open Cup	Total
1	MF	(Brazil)	31	Michel	5	9	0	0	14
2	FW	(United States)	55	Robbie Findley	2	2	0	0	4
2	FW	(Turks and Caicos Islands)	7	Billy Forbes	1	2	0	1	4
2	DF	(The Gambia)	98	Mamadou Danso	0	3	1	0	4
5	FW	(Greece)	9	Georgios Samaras	0	2	0	0	2
5	DF	(United States)	5	Sebastien Ibeagha	0	2	0	0	2
5	MF	(Colombia)	10	Sebastián Velásquez	0	2	0	0	2
5				Own goal	0	2	0	0	2
9	FW	(Jamaica)	23	Ryan Johnson	1	0	0	0	1
9	MF	(United States)	8	Tyler Gibson	1	0	0	0	1
9	FW	(United States)	19	Ian Svantesson	1	0	0	0	1
9	FW	(United States)	49	Devon Sandoval	0	1	0	0	1
9	MF	(Honduras)	18	Marvin Chávez	0	1	0	0	1
9	MF	(Brazil)	11	Pecka	0	1	0	0	1
9	DF	(Guatemala)	3	Moises Hernandez	0	1	0	0	1
TOTALS					11	28	1	1	41

=== Disciplinary record ===
Number	Nation	Position	Name	NASL Spring Season		NASL Fall Season		NASL Playoff		U.S. Open Cup		Total	
Number	Nation	Position	Name	Yellow card	Red card	Yellow card	Red card	Yellow card	Red card	Yellow card	Red card	Yellow card	Red card
2	(United States)	DF	Rauwshan McKenzie	0	0	1	0	0	0	0	0	1	0
3	(Guatemala)	DF	Moises Hernandez	0	0	6	0	0	0	0	0	6	0
4	(Spain)	DF	Juanan	0	0	0	0	0	0	1	0	1	0
5	(United States)	DF	Sebastien Ibeagha	0	0	3	0	0	0	0	0	3	0
6	(El Salvador)	MF	Richard Menjivar	0	0	4	0	0	0	0	0	4	0
7	(Turks and Caicos Islands)	FW	Billy Forbes	1	1	3	0	0	0	0	0	4	1
9	(Greece)	FW	Georgios Samaras	0	1	2	0	0	0	0	0	2	1
10	(Colombia)	MF	Sebastián Velásquez	2	0	1	0	1	0	0	0	4	0
11	(Brazil)	MF	Pecka	1	0	4	0	0	0	0	0	5	0
14	(United States)	MF	Jarad van Schaik	0	0	4	0	0	0	0	0	4	0
18	(Honduras)	MF	Marvin Chávez	0	0	4	0	0	0	0	0	4	0
19	(United States)	FW	Ian Svantesson	1	0	0	0	0	0	0	0	1	0
20	(Ghana)	MF	Derek Boateng	5	0	7	0	0	0	2	1	14	1
22	(Portugal)	GK	Daniel Fernandes	1	0	0	0	0	0	0	0	1	0
24	(Spain)	MF	Yuma	0	0	6	0	0	0	0	0	6	0
27	(Japan)	DF	Kosuke Kimura	1	0	2	0	1	0	0	0	4	0
31	(Brazil)	MF	Michel	5	1	2	1	0	0	0	1	7	3
98	(The Gambia)	DF	Mamadou Danso	2	0	1	0	0	0	0	0	3	0
			TOTALS	19	3	49	1	2	0	3	2	73	6
