= 2015 San Antonio Scorpions season =

San Antonio Scorpions
2015 season
- Owner: (United States) Gordon Hartman
- Manager: (Canada) Alen Marcina
- Stadium: Toyota Field
- NASL: Spring: 7th Fall: 10th Combined: 10th
- NASL Playoffs: Did not qualify
- U.S. Open Cup: Third Round
- Top goalscorer: League: Omar Cummings (10); All: Omar Cummings (10)
- Highest home attendance: 8,053 (October 25 vs. New York)
- Lowest home attendance: League: 4,192 (September 9 vs. Carolina); All: 3,583 (May 27 vs. Austin)
- Average home league attendance: League: 6,736; All: 6,539
Home colors	Away colors	Third colors

The 2015 San Antonio Scorpions FC season was the club's fourth season of existence and its fourth and last season in the North American Soccer League, the second division of the American soccer pyramid. Including the San Antonio Thunder soccer franchise of the original NASL, this was the 6th season of professional soccer in San Antonio. The Scorpions entered the 2015 NASL season as the reigning league champions after defeating the Fort Lauderdale Strikers 2–1 in the 2014 Soccer Bowl.

The 2015 season was sponsored by San Antonio-based deeproot Funds through a partnership.

== Roster ==
Note: Flags indicate national team as defined under FIFA eligibility rules; some limited exceptions apply. Players may hold more than one non-FIFA nationality. Squad correct as of October 1, 2015.

No.	Pos.	Nation	Player
1	GK	USA	Daryl Sattler
2	DF	USA	Brad Rusin
3	DF	TRI	Julius James
4	DF	CAN	Adrian Cann
5	DF	LBR	Monbo Bokar
6	DF	CAN	Nana Attakora
7	MF	TCA	Billy Forbes
8	MF	USA	Tyler Gibson
10	FW	CRC	César Elizondo
13	MF	USA	Johnny Lawson
14	FW	JAM	Omar Cummings
15	MF	MEX	Julio Garcia
16	MF	COL	Rafael Castillo
18	MF	HON	Marvin Chávez
19	MF	USA	Josue Soto
20	DF	HON	Milton Palacios
21	DF	JAM	Stephen DeRoux
22	GK	POR	Daniel Fernandes (on loan from FC Twente)
25	FW	USA	Kris Tyrpak
29	FW	FRA	Eric Hassli
42	MF	CMR	Joseph Nane
80	GK	USA	Matt Cardone
88	MF	GEO	Zourab Tsiskaridze
92	FW	USA	Giuseppe Gentile (on loan from FC Chiasso)

=== Transfers ===
==== Transfers in ====
No.	Pos.	Player	Previous club	Fee/notes	Date	Source
30	DF	(Colombia) Eduar Zea	(Colombia) Deportes Quindío	Undisclosed	January 29, 2015	
9	MF	(United States) Pablo Cruz	(United States) Atlanta Silverbacks	Undisclosed	February 11, 2015	
11	FW	(Colombia) Cristian Palomeque	(Colombia) Atlético Nacional	Season-long loan	February 18, 2015	
6	DF	(Canada) Nana Attakora	(United States) D.C. United	Undisclosed	February 25, 2015	
18	MF	(Honduras) Marvin Chávez	(United States) Chivas USA	Undisclosed	February 26, 2015	
33	MF	(Georgia (country)) Zourab Tsiskaridze	(Thailand) Bangkok Glass F.C.	Undisclosed	February 27, 2015	
8	MF	(United States) Tyler Gibson	(United States) Charlotte 49ers	Undisclosed	March 20, 2015	
00	GK	(United States) Jon Kempin	(United States) Sporting Kansas City	On loan from Sporting Kansas City	March 20, 2015	
14	FW	(Jamaica) Omar Cummings	(United States) Houston Dynamo	Undisclosed	March 27, 2015	
17	DF	(United States) Saad Abdul-Salaam	(United States) Sporting Kansas City	On loan from Sporting Kansas City	April 1, 2015	
42	MF	(Cameroon) Joseph Nane	(United States) New York Cosmos	Undisclosed	April 17, 2015	
80	GK	(United States) Matt Cardone	(United States) Trinity Tigers	Undisclosed	April 17, 2015	
20	FW	(Nigeria) Bright Dike	(Canada) Toronto FC	On loan from Toronto FC	April 27, 2015	
2	DF	(United States) Brad Rusin	(United States) Tampa Bay Rowdies	Trade	April 29, 2015	
92	FW	(United States) Giuseppe Gentile	(Switzerland) FC Chiasso	On loan from FC Chiasso	June 24, 2015	
5	DF	(Liberia) Monbo Bokar	(United States) Charlotte 49ers	Undisclosed	June 24, 2015	
13	MF	(United States) Johnny Lawson	(United States) Corinthians FC of San Antonio	Undisclosed	June 22, 2015	
22	GK	(Portugal) Daniel Fernandes	(Netherlands) FC Twente	On loan from FC Twente	August 3, 2015	
20	DF	(Honduras) Milton Palacios	(Guatemala) Heredia	Undisclosed	August 5, 2015	
9	MF	(Jamaica) Khari Stephenson	(United States) San Jose Earthquakes	On loan from San Jose Earthquakes	August 5, 2015	
25	FW	(United States) Kris Tyrpak	(United States) Austin Aztex	Undisclosed	October 1, 2015	

==== Transfers out ====
No.	Pos.	Player	Destination club	Fee/notes	Date	Source
2	DF	(United States) Jonathan Borrajo	(United States) Fort Lauderdale Strikers	Traded for future considerations	January 9, 2015	
12	DF	(United States) Greg Janicki	(United States) Indy Eleven	Undisclosed	January 9, 2015	
7	MF	(United States) Wálter Restrepo	(United States) New York Cosmos	Undisclosed	January 19, 2015	
28	FW	(United States) Giuseppe Gentile	(Switzerland) FC Chiasso	Undisclosed	January 21, 2015	
44	DF	(United States) Leone Cruz	(United States) Austin Aztex	Undisclosed	January 29, 2015	
20	FW	(The Gambia) Sainey Touray	(United States) Austin Aztex	Undisclosed	February 25, 2015	
9	FW	(Trinidad and Tobago) Trevin Caesar	(United States) Austin Aztex	Undisclosed	March 17, 2015	
22	FW	(Poland) Tomasz Zahorski	(United States) Charlotte Independence	Undisclosed	April 10, 2015	
5	MF	(El Salvador) Richard Menjivar	(United States) Tampa Bay Rowdies	Trade	April 29, 2015	
17	DF	(United States) Saad Abdul-Salaam	(United States) Sporting Kansas City	Recalled from loan by Sporting Kansas City	May 19, 2015	
00	GK	(United States) Jon Kempin	(United States) Sporting Kansas City	Recalled from loan by Sporting Kansas City	May 27, 2015	
9	MF	(United States) Pablo Cruz	(Canada) FC Edmonton	Undisclosed	June 18, 2015	
20	FW	(Nigeria) Bright Dike	(Canada) Toronto FC	End of loan from Toronto FC	June 27, 2015	
30	DF	(Colombia) Eduar Zea	(United States) Arizona United	Undisclosed	July 12, 2015	
11	FW	(Colombia) Cristian Palomeque	(Colombia) Jaguares de Córdoba	Undisclosed	July 17, 2015	
9	MF	(Jamaica) Khari Stephenson	(United States) San Jose Earthquakes	Recalled from loan by San Jose Earthquakes	September 1, 2015	

== Competitions ==
=== Pre-season ===
Kickoff times are in CDT (UTC-05) unless shown otherwise

==== deeproot Funds Cup ====
February 28, 2015 2nd Annual	San Antonio Scorpions	2–1	FC Dallas	San Antonio, Texas
7:00 p.m. CDT	Palomeque 70'; Elizondo 88'	Report	Meyer (yellow card) 27'; Agudelo 89'	Stadium: Toyota Field

==== Hill Country Derby ====
March 14, 2015 1st Annual	San Antonio Scorpions	1–4	Austin Aztex	San Antonio, Texas
7:30 p.m. CDT	Elizondo (yellow card) 34'; Zea (yellow card) 42'; Castillo 74'; Forbes (yellow card) 89' (yellow-red card) 90'		Guaraci 5', 11'; Tyrpak (yellow card) 45'; King 32', 66' (pen.) (red card) 89'	Stadium: Toyota Field

==== International Friendlies ====
March 28, 2015	San Antonio Scorpions (United States)	4–2	Costa Rica U-23	San Antonio, Texas
7:30 p.m. CDT	Chávez 8', 89'; Elizondo 34'; Marcina (red card) 45'; Hassli 53' (pen.)	Report	Picado 4'; Arias (yellow card) 45'; Guzmán 77'	Stadium: Toyota Field

=== Friendlies ===
Kickoff times are in CDT (UTC-05) unless shown otherwise

April 28, 2015	San Antonio Scorpions	5–0	All-Air Force Soccer Team	San Antonio, Texas
9:00 a.m. CDT	Forbes 12', 21', 55'; Garcia 18'; Palomeque 53'			Stadium: Toyota Field

June 27, 2015 International friendly	San Antonio Scorpions (United States)	0–1	(Costa Rica) C.S. Cartaginés	San Antonio, Texas
7:30 p.m. CDT	Cann (yellow card) 21'; Bokar (yellow card) 44'; Hassli (yellow card) 79'		Vega (yellow card) 6'; Johnson (yellow card) 27'; Guzmán (yellow card) 39'; Brenes 50'; Scott (yellow card) 60'	Stadium: Toyota Field

=== NASL Spring Season ===
The spring season will last for 10 games beginning on April 4 and ending on June 13. The schedule will feature a single round robin format with each team playing every other team in the league a single time. All teams will play 5 home games and 5 away games. The winner of the spring season will automatically qualify for the 2015 NASL Playoffs (The Championship).

==== Standings ====
Pos	Team	Pld	W	D	L	GF	GA	GD	Pts	Qualification
1	New York Cosmos (S)	10	5	5	0	18	9	+9	20	Playoffs
2	Tampa Bay Rowdies	10	5	4	1	15	9	+6	19	
3	Carolina RailHawks	10	3	5	2	15	10	+5	14	
4	Minnesota United	10	3	5	2	15	13	+2	14	
5	Indy Eleven	10	3	4	3	13	12	+1	13	
6	Jacksonville Armada	10	3	3	4	15	18	−3	12	
7	San Antonio Scorpions	10	3	3	4	11	15	−4	12	
8	Fort Lauderdale Strikers	10	3	2	5	12	13	−1	11	
9	Ottawa Fury	10	2	5	3	5	8	−3	11	
10	FC Edmonton	10	2	3	5	16	22	−6	9	
11	Atlanta Silverbacks	10	1	5	4	7	13	−6	8	

Source: NASL
Rules for classification: 1) points; 2) total goal differential; 3) total goals scored; 4) head-to-head record; 5) away goal differential; 6) away goals scored
(S) Spring season champion

==== Results summary ====
Overall								Home						Away					
Pld	W	D	L	GF	GA	GD	Pts	W	D	L	GF	GA	GD	W	D	L	GF	GA	GD
10	3	3	4	11	15	−4	12	1	2	2	4	6	−2	2	1	2	7	9	−2

Last updated: June 15, 2015.
Source: http://www.nasl.com/standings

===== Results by round =====
Round	1	2	3	4	5	6	7	8	9	10
Stadium	H	H	A	A	H	A	A	H	A	H
Result	L	L	D	L	W	W	L	D	W	D
Position	11	11	11	11	11	8	10	10	6	7

Updated to match(es) played on June 15, 2015. Source: nasl.com
A = Away; H = Home; W = Win; D = Draw; L = Loss

==== Matches ====
Kickoff times are in CDT (UTC-05) unless shown otherwise

Win Loss Draw

April 4, 2015 Spring #1	San Antonio Scorpions	1–3	Tampa Bay Rowdies	San Antonio, Texas
7:30 PM CDT	Soto (yellow card) 16'; Chávez (yellow card) 55'; Elizondo (yellow card) 64'; James (yellow card) 80' (yellow-red card) 90'; Cummings 90'	Report	Antonijevic 10'; Savage (yellow card) 17'; Espinal (yellow card) 27', (goal) 45+'; Hernández (yellow card) 40'; Saragosa (yellow card) 45'; Guerra (yellow card) 47'; Hertzog 61'; Portillos (yellow card) 75'	Stadium: Toyota Field; Attendance: 6,723; Referee: Daniel Radford

April 18, 2015 Spring #2	San Antonio Scorpions	1–2	Indy Eleven	San Antonio, Texas
7:30 PM CDT	Cummings 52'	Report	Mares (yellow card) 24'; Norales 64'; Ring (yellow card) 82'; Peña 89'	Stadium: Toyota Field; Attendance: 5,305; Referee: Mathieu Bordeau

April 25, 2015 Spring #3	Minnesota United FC	2–2	San Antonio Scorpions	Blaine, Minnesota
7:00 PM CDT	Ramirez (yellow card) 25', (goal) 59' (pen.); Campos 34'; Ibarra (yellow card) 55'	Report	Tsiskaridze 8', (yellow card) 31'; Attakora (yellow card) 61'; Castillo 90+1' (pen.)	Stadium: National Sports Center; Attendance: 9,233; Referee: Alejandro Mariscal

May 2, 2015 Spring #4	Jacksonville Armada FC	2–1	San Antonio Scorpions	Jacksonville, Florida
6:30 PM CDT	Millien 4'; Trejo (yellow card) 33'; Ortiz (yellow card) 56'; Johnson (yellow card) 61'; Keita (yellow card) 63', (goal) 90+3'		Cummings 8'; Castillo (yellow card) 27'; Attakora (yellow card) 63'; DeRoux (yellow card) 68'; Tsiskaridze (yellow card) 74'	Stadium: Baseball Grounds of Jacksonville; Attendance: 8,147; Referee: Kevin Terry Jr.

May 9, 2015 Spring #5	San Antonio Scorpions	1–0	Carolina RailHawks	San Antonio, Texas
7:30 PM CDT	DeRoux (yellow card) 70'; Dike 78'		Low (yellow card) 6'; Scott (yellow card) 60'	Stadium: Toyota Field; Attendance: 7,252; Referee: Dave Gantar

May 17, 2015 Spring #6	FC Edmonton	2–3	San Antonio Scorpions	Edmonton, Alberta
3:00 PM CDT	Fordyce 53', 74'		Cummings 21'; Forbes 62', 82'	Stadium: Clarke Stadium; Attendance: 2,236; Referee: Justin Tasev

May 23, 2015 Spring #7	New York Cosmos	3–0	San Antonio Scorpions	Hempstead, New York
6:00 PM CDT	Raúl 18' (pen.); Gorskie (yellow card) 24'; Walter Restrepo (yellow card) 64'; Rovérsio 81'; Fernandes 86'		Tyler Gibson (yellow card) 19'; Attakora (yellow card) 45'	Stadium: Shuart Stadium; Attendance: 5,032; Referee: Kevin Terry Jr.

May 30, 2015 Spring #8	San Antonio Scorpions	1–1	Fort Lauderdale Strikers	San Antonio, Texas
7:30 PM CDT	Nane 21'; DeRoux (yellow card) 62' (yellow-red card) 86'		Pinho 43'	Stadium: Toyota Field; Attendance: 6,396; Referee: Tyler Ploeger

June 6, 2015 Spring #9	Atlanta Silverbacks	0–1	San Antonio Scorpions	Atlanta, Georgia
6:30 PM CDT	Harlley (yellow card) 71'		Cummings 26'; Attakora (yellow card) 46'; Castillo (yellow card) 90'	Stadium: Atlanta Silverbacks Park; Attendance: 5,000; Referee: Jaime Herrera

June 13, 2015 Spring #10	San Antonio Scorpions	0–0	Ottawa Fury FC	San Antonio, Texas
7:30 PM CDT	Nane (yellow card) 41'; Cann (yellow card) 45'		Ubiparipović (yellow card) 77'	Stadium: Toyota Field; Attendance: 6,709; Referee: Mark Kadlecik

==== Awards ====
NASL Weekly Awards – Spring 2015
Week	Player	Nation	Award	Link
Week 4	Zourab Tsiskaridze	GEO	Play of the Week; Team of the Week	
Week 5	Omar Cummings	JAM	Play of the Week	
Week 6	Rafael Castillo	COL	Team of the Week	
Week 6	Billy Forbes	TCA	Team of the Week	
Week 7	Billy Forbes	TCA	Player of the Week; Team of the Week	
Week 7	Stephen DeRoux	JAM	Team of the Week	
Week 9	Joseph Nane	CMR	Team of the Week	
Week 10	Omar Cummings	JAM	Team of the Week	
Week 10	Daryl Sattler	USA	Team of the Week	
Week 11	Julius James	TRI	Team of the Week	

=== NASL Fall Season ===
The fall season will last for 20 games beginning on July 4 and ending on October 21. The schedule will feature a double round robin format with each team playing every other team in the league two times. All teams will play 10 home games and 10 away games. The winner of the fall season will automatically qualify for the 2015 NASL Playoffs (The Championship).

==== Standings ====
Pos	Team	Pld	W	D	L	GF	GA	GD	Pts	Qualification
1	Ottawa Fury (F)	20	13	6	1	37	15	+22	45	Playoffs
2	Minnesota United	20	11	6	3	39	26	+13	39	
3	New York Cosmos	20	10	6	4	31	21	+10	36	
4	Fort Lauderdale Strikers	20	8	6	6	37	27	+10	30	
5	FC Edmonton	20	7	5	8	25	24	+1	26	
6	Atlanta Silverbacks	20	6	7	7	24	27	−3	25	
7	Carolina RailHawks	20	6	3	11	29	39	−10	21	
8	Tampa Bay Rowdies	20	5	5	10	18	28	−10	20	
9	Indy Eleven	20	5	5	10	23	36	−13	20	
10	San Antonio Scorpions	20	4	7	9	30	37	−7	19	
11	Jacksonville Armada	20	5	4	11	18	31	−13	19	

Source: NASL
Rules for classification: 1) points; 2) total goal differential; 3) total goals scored; 4) head-to-head record; 5) away goal differential; 6) away goals scored
(F) Fall season champion

==== Results summary ====
Overall								Home						Away					
Pld	W	D	L	GF	GA	GD	Pts	W	D	L	GF	GA	GD	W	D	L	GF	GA	GD
20	4	7	9	30	37	−7	19	3	3	4	20	19	+1	1	4	5	10	18	−8

Source: http://www.nasl.com/standings

===== Results by round =====
Round	1	2	3	4	5	6	7	8	9	10	11	12	13	14	15	16	17	18	19	20
Stadium	A	H	H	A	H	A	A	H	A	H	H	H	A	H	H	A	A	A	H	A
Result	L	W	D	L	L	D	L	W	D	L	D	W	L	D	L	W	L	D	L	D
Position	11	6	6	7	8	9	10	9	8	11	11	7	8	7	9	7	9	7	10	10

Updated to match(es) played on November 1, 2015. Source: nasl.com
A = Away; H = Home; W = Win; D = Draw; L = Loss

==== Matches ====
Kickoff times are in CDT (UTC-05) unless shown otherwise

Win Loss Draw

July 5, 2015 Fall #1 – Wood Buffalo Cup	FC Edmonton	4–0	San Antonio Scorpions	Fort McMurray, Alberta
3:00 PM CDT	Jalali 2' (pen.); Smith (yellow card) 5'; Edward (yellow card) 31'; Laing 68', 83'; Boakai 74'	Report	Soto (yellow card) 19'; Attakora (red card) 66'; Sattler (red card) 69'; Castillo (yellow card) 82'	Stadium: Shell Place; Attendance: 1,112; Referee: Yursl Rudolf

July 11, 2015 Fall #2	San Antonio Scorpions	3–0	Tampa Bay Rowdies	San Antonio, Texas
7:30 PM CDT	Chávez 11'; Cummings 54', 62'; Castillo (yellow card) 76'	Report	Guerra (yellow card) 15'; King (yellow card) 26'; Antonijevic (yellow card) 74'	Stadium: Toyota Field; Attendance: 7,636; Referee: Younes Marrakchi

July 15, 2015 Fall #3	San Antonio Scorpions	2–2	FC Edmonton	San Antonio, Texas
7:30 PM CDT	Cummings 17'; Elizondo 57'; Gibson (yellow card) 58'; Castillo (yellow card) 90'	Report	de Freitas (yellow card) 27'; Nonni 36'; Smith (yellow card) 40'; Raudales 71'	Stadium: Toyota Field; Attendance: 4,912; Referee: Mark Kadlecik

July 18, 2015 Fall #4	Carolina Railhawks	3–2	San Antonio Scorpions	Cary, North Carolina
6:30 PM CDT	Hlavaty 22'; Novo 24', 67' (pen.); Low (yellow card) 67' da Luz (yellow card) 78'	Report	Bokar (yellow card) 6'; Elizondo (yellow card) 26', (goal) 35'; Attakora (yellow card) 63'; Castillo 75' (pen.)	Stadium: WakeMed Soccer Park; Attendance: 4,180; Referee: Jaime Herrera

July 25, 2015 Fall #5	San Antonio Scorpions	3–4	Minnesota United FC	San Antonio, Texas
7:30 PM CDT	Cann 16'; Castillo 34' (pen.), 86' (pen.), (yellow card) 77'; Chávez (yellow card) 44'; Rusin (yellow card) 89'; Hassli (yellow card) 90' (yellow-red card) 90'	Report	Ramirez 12'; Calvano (yellow card) 14'; Davis 22'; Ibson 37'; Alhassan 48'; Vicentini (yellow card) 85'	Stadium: Toyota Field; Attendance: 7,087; Referee: Daniel Fitzgerald

August 8, 2015 Fall #6	Atlanta Silverbacks	3–3	San Antonio Scorpions	Atlanta, Georgia
6:30 PM CDT	Mendes 23'; Burgos (yellow card) 32', (goal) 51'; Chavez 57'	Report	Cummings 25', 71'; Chávez (yellow card) 42'; Forbes 60'; Cann (yellow card) 77'; Castillo (yellow card) 80'	Stadium: Atlanta Silverbacks Park; Attendance: 4,442; Referee: Mathieu Bourdeau

August 15, 2015 Fall #7	New York Cosmos	2–1	San Antonio Scorpions	Hempstead, New York
6:00 PM CDT	Fernandes 45+3'; Rusin 47' (o.g.)	Report	Palacios 45+1'; Nane (red card) 84'	Stadium: Shuart Stadium; Attendance: 4,006; Referee: Dave Gantar

August 22, 2015 Fall #8	San Antonio Scorpions	1–0	Jacksonville Armada FC	San Antonio, Texas
7:30 PM CDT	Forbes 64'; Palacios (yellow card) 87'	Report	Ortiz (yellow card) 5'; Castrillón (yellow card) 49'; Millien (yellow card) 86'	Stadium: Toyota Field; Attendance: 7,569; Referee: Marcos De Oliveira

August 29, 2015 Fall #9	Jacksonville Armada FC	0–0	San Antonio Scorpions	Jacksonville, Florida
6:30 PM CDT	Scaglia (yellow card) 27'	Report	Rusin (yellow card) 62'	Stadium: Baseball Grounds of Jacksonville; Attendance: 7,053; Referee: Baboucarr Jallow
Note: 100th regular season NASL match

September 5, 2015 Fall #10	San Antonio Scorpions	0–1	Ottawa Fury FC	San Antonio, Texas
7:30 PM CDT	Tsiskaridze (red card) 38'; Attakora (yellow card) 55'; Castillo (yellow card) 85'	Report	Alves (yellow card) 45'; Minatel 50'	Stadium: Toyota Field; Attendance: 6,473; Referee: Nima Saghafi

September 9, 2015 Fall #11	San Antonio Scorpions	3–3	Carolina Railhawks	San Antonio, Texas
7:30 PM CDT	Cann (red card) 19'; Castillo (yellow card) 19', (goal) 56' (pen.); Chávez 28', 65'; Rusin (yellow card) 37'; Elizondo (yellow card) 41'; Attakora (yellow card) 43'; Palacios (yellow card) 84'; DeRoux (yellow card) 90'	Report	Novo 21', (yellow card) 90'; Shipalane 25'; Tobin (yellow card) 40' (yellow-red card) 54'; Albadawi (yellow card) 43'; Wagner (yellow card) 54'; Attakora 77' (o.g.); Da Silva (yellow card) 90'	Stadium: Toyota Field; Attendance: 4,105; Referee: Daniel Radford

September 12, 2015 Fall #12	San Antonio Scorpions	2–0	Indy Eleven	San Antonio, Texas
7:30 PM CDT	Castillo 45+1' (pen.), 72'; Cummings (yellow card) 57'; Attakora (yellow card) 78'; Elizondo (red card) 90+2'	Report	Richards (yellow card) 17'	Stadium: Toyota Field; Attendance: 7,232; Referee: Jaime Herrera

September 19, 2015 Fall #13	Tampa Bay Rowdies	2–0	San Antonio Scorpions	St. Petersburg, Florida
6:30 PM CDT	Hertzog 50' (pen.); Agbossoumonde (yellow card) 69'; King (yellow card) 82'; Guerra 88'	Report	DeRoux (yellow card) 77'	Stadium: Al Lang Stadium; Attendance: 6,135; Referee: Robert Sibiga

September 26, 2015 Fall #14	San Antonio Scorpions	3–3	Atlanta Silverbacks	San Antonio, Texas
7:30 PM CDT	Attakora 41'; Chávez 80'; Elizondo 90'	Report	Chavez 8', 58'; McKenzie 23'; Burgos (yellow card) 70'; Mensing (yellow card) 79'; Ceus (yellow card) 84'	Stadium: Toyota Field; Attendance: 7,759; Referee: Jose Carlos Rivero

October 3, 2015 Fall #15	San Antonio Scorpions	2–4	Fort Lauderdale Strikers	San Antonio, Texas
7:30 PM CDT	Cann (yellow card) 50'; Tyrpak 56'; Hassli (yellow card) 63'; DeRoux 79'	Report	Pinho 10', 40', 86'; Freitas 15'; Borrajo (yellow card) 37'; Nunes (yellow card) 90'	Stadium: Toyota Field; Attendance: 7,832; Referee: Alejandro Mariscal

October 10, 2015 Fall #16	Indy Eleven	1–2	San Antonio Scorpions	Indianapolis, Indiana
6:30 PM CDT	Peña (yellow card) 56'; Mares 69'; Miller (yellow card) 72'	Report	Gentile 19'; Cann (yellow card) 25'; Tyrpak 79'; Fernandes (yellow card) 90'	Stadium: Michael Carroll Stadium; Attendance: 10,090; Referee: Hilario Grajeda

October 18, 2015 Fall #17	Ottawa Fury FC	1–0	San Antonio Scorpions	Ottawa, Ontario
2:00 PM CDT	Eustaquio 68'; Alves (yellow card) 90'; Peiser (yellow card) 90'	Report	Tyrpak (yellow card) 88'; Hassli (red card) 90'	Stadium: TD Place Stadium; Attendance: 5,023; Referee: Yuri Rudolf

October 21, 2015 Fall #18	Fort Lauderdale Strikers	0–0	San Antonio Scorpions	Fort Lauderdale, Florida
6:30 PM CDT		Report	Chávez (yellow card) 78'	Stadium: Lockhart Stadium; Attendance: 2,632; Referee: Juan Marquez

October 25, 2015 Fall #19	San Antonio Scorpions	1–2	New York Cosmos	San Antonio, Texas
1:00 PM CDT	Tsiskaridze (yellow card) 41'; Forbes 43'; Attakora (yellow card) 89'	Report	Gorskie (yellow card) 32'; Senna 62' (pen.); Ayoze 78'; Restrepo (yellow card) 89'	Stadium: Toyota Field; Attendance: 8,053; Referee: Alejandro Mariscal

October 31, 2015 Fall #20	Minnesota United FC	2–2	San Antonio Scorpions	Blaine, Minnesota
7:00 PM CDT	Campos 70' (pen.); Venegas 90+'	Report	Gentile 54'; Castillo 85' (pen.)	Stadium: National Sports Center; Attendance: 5,890; Referee: Robert Sibiga

==== Awards ====
NASL Weekly Awards – Fall 2015
Week	Player	Nation	Award	Link
Week 2	Omar Cummings	JAM	Player of the Week; Team of the Week	
Week 2	Matt Cardone	USA	Team of the Week	
Week 3	Billy Forbes	TCA	Team of the Week	
Week 6	Omar Cummings	JAM	Team of the Week	
Week 8	Stephen DeRoux	JAM	Team of the Week	
Week 8	Daniel Fernandes	POR	Team of the Week	
Week 9	Daniel Fernandes	POR	Team of the Week	
Week 11	Rafael Castillo	COL	Player of the Week; Team of the Week	
Week 11	Marvin Chávez	HON	Team of the Week	
Week 13	Nana Attakora	CAN	Team of the Week	
Week 14	Kris Tyrpak	USA	Play of the Week	
Week 15	Marvin Chávez	HON	Team of the Week	
Week 15	Kris Tyrpak	USA	Team of the Week	
Week 15	Giuseppe Gentile	USA	Play of the Week	
Week 17	Billy Forbes	TCA	Team of the Week	
Week 18	Billy Forbes	TCA	Team of the Week	

=== U.S. Open Cup ===
May 27, 2015 Third round	San Antonio Scorpions (Texas)	0–2	(Texas) Austin Aztex	San Antonio, Texas
7:30 PM CDT	Attakora (yellow card) 35'; DeRoux (yellow card) 67' (yellow-red card) 90+'; James (yellow card) 79' (yellow-red card) 90+'; Castillo (yellow card) 85'; Elizondo (yellow card) 88'		Guaraci (yellow card) 31'; Ambrose 50'; Caesar 77'	Stadium: Toyota Field; Attendance: 3,583; Referee: Kyle Phillips
