= Robert Finley (disambiguation) =

Robert Finley (1772–1817) was the president of the University of Georgia.

Robert Finley may also refer to:

- Bob Finley (1915–1986), baseball player
- Robert Finley (musician) (born 1954), American blues musician
- Bob Finley (missionary) (1922–2019), American missionary

== See also ==
- Robert Finlay, 1st Viscount Finlay, British lawyer, doctor and politician
- Robert Findley, soccer player
- Robert Findlay (disambiguation)
