= Robert Findlay =

Robert Findlay may refer to:

- Robert Findlay (architect) (1859–1951), Scottish-Canadian architect
- Robert Findlay (minister) (1721–1814), Scottish minister
- Robert Findlay (footballer) (1877–1926), Scottish football (soccer) player
- Robert Findlay (umpire), Australian rules football umpire

== See also ==
- Robbie Findley (born 1985), American soccer player
- Robert Finlay, 1st Viscount Finlay (1842–1929), British lawyer and politician
- Robert Finley (disambiguation)
