= Mamadou Danso =

Gambian footballer

Personal information
- Full name: Mamadou Danso
- Date of birth: April 27, 1983 (age 43)
- Place of birth: Serrekunda, Gambia
- Height: 6 ft 3 in (1.91 m)
- Position: Centre back

Team information
- Current team: PDX FC (U21 coach)

Youth career
- 2005–2006: NC Wesleyan Battling Bishops
- 2007–2008: SPSU Hornets

Senior career*
Years	Team	Apps	(Gls)
2008	Cary RailHawks U23s	8	(2)
2009–2010	Portland Timbers	40	(2)
2011–2014	Portland Timbers	60	(4)
2014	Montreal Impact	3	(0)
2015	Carolina Railhawks	19	(1)
2016	Rayo OKC	32	(4)
2017	Kelantan	22	(0)
2018	North Carolina FC	9	(0)
2018	UiTM	7	(0)
2020	Portland Timbers 2	5	(0)
2022	Portland Timbers U23	0	(0)

International career^{‡}
2011–	Gambia	20	(3)

Managerial career
- 2020: PDX FC (U21)
- * Club domestic league appearances and goals as of 4 October 2020 ‡ National team caps and goals as of 22 March 2019

Mamadou "Futty" Danso (born April 27, 1983) is a Gambian professional footballer who plays as a centre back.

== Career ==
=== College and amateur ===
Danso was recruited to play soccer for North Carolina Wesleyan College and also went on to play two years of college soccer at Southern Polytechnic State University, where he was a two-time All-Southern States Athletic Conference selection. Danso became SPSU’s first All-America selection in 2008, after leading the conference in scoring with 19 goals, and finished his college career with 35 goals in total.

During his college years Danso also played in the USL Premier Development League for Cary RailHawks U23s.

=== Professional ===
Danso was acquired by Major League Soccer (MLS) club D.C. United via the waiver ranking order, having left college early to turn professional, but was transferred to Portland Timbers of the USL First Division in April 2009 without ever signing a contract with MLS.

Danso made his professional debut on April 25, 2009, coming on as a late substitute in Portland's game against the Vancouver Whitecaps. He scored his first professional goal on May 24, 2009, in a 2–1 victory over the Puerto Rico Islanders. He stayed with the Timbers when they moved to MLS in 2011, playing as a defender there for three and a half seasons and helping them win the Western Conference standings and advance to the Western Conference Final in 2013. When Danso played with fellow Gambian Pa Modou Kah, the two Timbers centerbacks became known as "The Great Wall of Gambia".

In June 2014, Danso was traded to the Montreal Impact in exchange for a second-round pick in the 2015 MLS SuperDraft.

In March 2015, Danso was announced as a new signing of the Carolina Railhawks.

In January 2017, Danso was unveiled as one of Kelantan FA's import players, replacing Cédric Djeugoue who failed to be signed by the club after he had a problem with his documents.

In March 2018, Danso signed for North Carolina FC (the renamed North Carolina Railhawks). On Jan. 1, 2019 he joined the Malaysian team UiTM FC.

In August 2020, Portland Timbers 2, the USL reserve team of the Portland Timbers, announced that they had signed Danso. Timbers 2 opted to stop operating following the 2020 season.

=== International ===
On August 30, 2010, Danso was given his first chance at international play by being selected to the Gambia national football team's September 5, 2010 African Cup of Nations qualifier against Namibia.

=== Coaching career ===
In September 10, 2020, it was announced that Danso will join PDX FC to serve as the head coach for the new U21 team. For the 2021 season PDX FC moved to USL League Two from National Premier Soccer League.

== Career statistics ==
As of 28 October 2017.

Appearances and goals by club, season and competition
Club	Season	League			FA Cup		League Cup		Other		Total	
Club	Season	Division	Apps	Goals	Apps	Goals	Apps	Goals	Apps	Goals	Apps	Goals
Carolina RailHawks U23	2008	Premier Development League	8	2	—						8	2
Carolina RailHawks U23	Total		8	2	—						8	2
Portland Timbers (USL)	2009	USSF Division 2 Professional League	16	1	—						16	1
Portland Timbers (USL)	2010	USSF Division 2 Professional League	24	1	—						24	1
Portland Timbers (USL)	Total		40	2	—						40	2
Portland Timbers	2011	Major League Soccer	24	3	0	0	—				24	3
Portland Timbers	2012	Major League Soccer	10	0	0	0	—				10	0
Portland Timbers	2013	Major League Soccer	16	0	2	1	—				18	1
Portland Timbers	2013	MLS Reserve League	6	0	—						6	0
Portland Timbers	2014	Major League Soccer	10	1	0	0	—				10	1
Portland Timbers	Total		66	4	2	1	—				68	5
Montreal Impact	2014	Major League Soccer	3	0	—				0	0	3	0
Montreal Impact	2014	MLS Reserve League	5	1	—						5	1
Montreal Impact	Total		8	1	—				0	0	8	1
Carolina Railhawks	2015	North American Soccer League	19	1	1	0	—				20	1
Carolina Railhawks	Total		19	1	1	0	—				20	1
Rayo OKC	2016	North American Soccer League	32	4	1	0	—				33	4
Rayo OKC	Total		32	4	1	0	—				33	4
Kelantan	2017	Malaysia Super League	22	0	1	0	6	1	—		29	1
Kelantan	Total		22	0	1	0	6	1	0	0	29	1
UiTM	2018	Malaysia Premier League	4	0	0	0	0	0	—		4	0
UiTM	Total		4	0	0	0	0	0	—		4	0
Career total			199	14	5	1	6	1	0	0	210	16

=== International goals ===
Scores and results list the Gambia's goal tally first.

No.	Date	Venue	Opponent	Score	Result	Competition
1.	20 January 2013	Stade Général Seyni Kountché, Niamey, Niger	Niger	2–0	3–1	Friendly
2.	22 March 2019	Mustapha Tchaker Stadium, Blida, Algeria	Algeria	1–1	1–1	2019 Africa Cup of Nations qualification

== Personal ==
Danso holds a U.S. green card which qualifies him as a domestic player for MLS roster purposes. Danso became an American citizen in 2018 and now holds dual citizenship with The Gambia and the United States of America.

== Honors ==
Portland Timbers

- USL First Division Commissioner's Cup: 2009
