= Rayo OKC =

- Full name: Rayo Oklahoma City
- Founded: 2016; 10 years ago
- Dissolved: January 2017
- Stadium: Miller Stadium; Yukon, Oklahoma
- Capacity: 7,000
- Owner(s): Raúl Martín Presa; Sean Jones
- League: North American Soccer League (2016)
- 2016: Spring: 8th Fall: 4th Combined: 4th Playoffs: Semifinals
| Home colors | Away colors | Third colors |

Rayo OKC, also known as Rayo Oklahoma City, was an American professional soccer team based in Oklahoma City, Oklahoma. They joined the North American Soccer League (NASL) – the second tier of the American soccer pyramid – beginning with the 2016 season. They played home games at Yukon High School's Miller Stadium in Yukon, Oklahoma. The club permanently ceased operations following the 2016 season, citing huge financial losses, management issues and heavy competition from the nearby Oklahoma City Energy FC of the USL as the main reasons.

== History ==
On November 10, 2015, the NASL announced that a new club called Rayo OKC would begin to play in the 2016 season. The new team was majority-owned by Raúl Martín Presa, the owner of Rayo Vallecano of the Spanish Segunda División, with a minority stake owned by Oklahoma native Sean Jones, former owner of the Oklahoma City FC franchise. Rayo OKC was also co-founded and managed by "Sold Out Strategies," a sports management company headed by former Oklahoma City Blazers general manager Brad Lund. Former San Antonio Scorpions head coach Alen Marcina was named Rayo head coach on January 7, 2016. Marcina resigned on August 1, being replaced by Gerard Nus.

In August 2016, it was announced that co-founding partner and management Sold Out Strategies had pulled out of Rayo OKC'S day-to-day front office business operations. In September, it was reported that minority owner Sean Jones had part of the temporary artificial soccer field removed during the night and held at an undisclosed location to protect his investment pending a resolution. After a week and a half of negotiations, it was reported that Rayo OKC management and Sean Jones had reached a mutual agreement and the missing portions of the artificial playing turf were returned in time for the team's next home game.

On November 7, 2016, following the conclusion of the 2016 NASL Playoffs, head coach Gerard Nus stepped down and returned to Spain to continue his role as assistant technical director for Rayo OKC'S parent club, Rayo Vallecano.

On December 1, 2016, it reported that Rayo OKC had released all of their players and did not have its majority owners or anyone from the Rayo OKC management representing them at the NASL's board of directors meeting in Atlanta. In January 2017, it was confirmed by the NASL that Rayo OKC would not be participating in the 2017 season, eventually resulting in the dissolving of the franchise.

=== League and cup history ===
| Season | NASL | | | | | | | | | Overall | NASL Playoffs | U.S. Open Cup | Top goalscorer | | Head coaches |
| Season | Div. | Pos. | Pl. | W | D | L | GS | GA | P | Overall | NASL Playoffs | U.S. Open Cup | Name | League | Head coaches |
|---|---|---|---|---|---|---|---|---|---|---|---|---|---|---|---|
| 2016 | Spring | 8th | 10 | 3 | 3 | 4 | 11 | 12 | 12 | 4th | Semifinals | Third Round | (Brazil) Michel | 14 | (Canada) Alen Marcina (Spain) Gerard Nus |
| 2016 | Fall | 4th | 22 | 9 | 8 | 5 | 28 | 21 | 35 | 4th | Semifinals | Third Round | (Brazil) Michel | 14 | (Canada) Alen Marcina (Spain) Gerard Nus |

== Individual records ==
=== Top goalscorers ===
As of match played November 5, 2016

| | Name | Years | NASL | NASL Playoff | U.S. Open Cup | Total |
|---|---|---|---|---|---|---|
| 1 | (Brazil) Michel | 2016 | 14 (27) | 0 (1) | 0 (1) | 14 (29) |
| 2 | (United States) Robbie Findley | 2016 | 4 (21) | 0 (0) | 0 (1) | 4 (22) |
| 2 | (Turks and Caicos Islands) Billy Forbes | 2016 | 3 (29) | 0 (1) | 1 (1) | 4 (31) |
| 2 | (The Gambia) Mamadou Danso | 2016 | 3 (31) | 1 (1) | 0 (1) | 4 (31) |
| 5 | (Greece) Georgios Samaras | 2016 | 2 (23) | 0 (1) | 0 (1) | 2 (25) |
| 5 | (United States) Sebastien Ibeagha | 2016 | 2 (28) | 0 (1) | 0 (0) | 2 (25) |
| 5 | (Colombia) Sebastián Velásquez | 2016 | 2 (15) | 0 (1) | 0 (0) | 2 (16) |
| 8 | (Jamaica) Ryan Johnson | 2016 | 1 (4) | 0 (0) | 0 (0) | 1 (4) |
| 8 | (United States) Tyler Gibson | 2016 | 1 (15) | 0 (1) | 0 (1) | 1 (17) |
| 8 | (United States) Ian Svantesson | 2016 | 1 (6) | 0 (0) | 0 (1) | 1 (7) |
| 8 | (United States) Devon Sandoval | 2016 | 1 (12) | 0 (1) | 0 (0) | 1 (13) |
| 8 | (Honduras) Marvin Chávez | 2016 | 1 (14) | 0 (1) | 0 (0) | 1 (15) |
| 8 | (Brazil) Pecka | 2016 | 1 (10) | 0 (1) | 0 (0) | 1 (21) |
| 8 | (Guatemala) Moises Hernandez | 2016 | 1 (26) | 0 (0) | 0 (0) | 1 (26) |

=== Most appearances ===
As of Match played 5 November 2016

| | Name | Years | League | Playoffs | US Open Cup | Total |
|---|---|---|---|---|---|---|
| 1 | (Japan) Kosuke Kimura | 2016 | 32 (0) | 1 (0) | 1 (0) | 34 (0) |
| 2 | (The Gambia) Mamadou Danso | 2016 | 31 (3) | 1 (0) | 1 (0) | 33 (3) |
| 3 | (El Salvador) Richard Menjivar | 2016 | 30 (0) | 1 (0) | 1 (0) | 32 (0) |
| 3 | (Portugal) Daniel Fernandes | 2016 | 30 (0) | 1 (0) | 1 (0) | 32 (0) |
| 5 | (Turks and Caicos Islands) Billy Forbes | 2016 | 29 (3) | 1 (0) | 1 (1) | 31 (4) |
| 6 | (Ghana) Derek Boateng | 2016 | 28 (0) | 0 (0) | 1 (0) | 29 (0) |
| 6 | (Brazil) Michel | 2016 | 27 (14) | 1 (0) | 1 (0) | 29 (14) |
| 8 | (Guatemala) Moises Hernandez | 2016 | 26 (1) | 0 (0) | 0 (0) | 26 (1) |
| 9 | (Greece) Georgios Samaras | 2016 | 23 (2) | 1 (0) | 1 (0) | 25 (2) |
| 10 | (United States) Robbie Findley | 2016 | 21 (4) | 0 (0) | 1 (0) | 22 (4) |

=== Managerial record ===
Information correct as of match played November 5, 2016. Only competitive matches are counted.

| Name | Nat. | From | To | P | W | D | L | GS | GA | %W | Honours | Notes |
|---|---|---|---|---|---|---|---|---|---|---|---|---|
| Alen Marcina | Canada | January 7, 2016 | August 1, 2016 | 18 | 6 | 6 | 6 | 22 | 20 | 33.33 | | |
| Gerard Nus | Spain | August 1, 2016 | November 7, 2016 | 16 | 6 | 5 | 5 | 19 | 17 | 37.50 | | |

- Notes:

P – Total of played matches W – Won matches D – Drawn matches L – Lost matches GS – Goal scored GA – Goals against
%W – Percentage of matches won

Nationality is indicated by the corresponding FIFA country code(s).
