= Christian Aid Mission =

Evangelical Christian mission organization

- Founded: 1970; 56 years ago
- Founder: Robert Finley
- Type: Faith-based
- Purpose: Indigenous Mission Support
- Location: Charlottesville, Virginia, USA
- Region served: International
- Method: Direct aid
- Website: www.christianaid.org

Christian Aid Mission is an evangelical Christian mission organization that provides aid to indigenous missionary ministries working in countries of poverty or Christian persecution. The organization was founded by Bob Finley, who was one of the early pioneers of supporting missionaries native to their country or region, as opposed to sending foreign missionaries. The international headquarters is in Charlottesville, Virginia.

== History ==
Bob Finley founded Christian Aid originally as a division of International Students. Its purpose was to assist indigenous mission leaders in lands where foreign missionary work was restricted or illegal. By 1970, the Christian Aid division grew to such an extent that it was decided to create a new organization called Christian Aid Mission. The organization was originally headquartered in Washington, D.C., and later moved in 1976 to Charlottesville, Virginia, where it is presently headquartered.
