= Billy Forbes (footballer, born 1990) =

Turks and Caicos Islander footballer

Personal information
- Full name: Cadet Billy Forbes
- Date of birth: 13 December 1990 (age 35)
- Place of birth: Providenciales, Turks and Caicos Islands
- Height: 1.78 m (5 ft 10 in)
- Positions: Winger; striker

College career
Years	Team	Apps	(Gls)
2009–2010	Western Texas Westerners	35	(17)
2011–2012	Lubbock Christian Chaparrals		

Senior career*
Years	Team	Apps	(Gls)
2006–2008	Provopool Celtic		
2008–2009	AFC Academy		
2012	Mississippi Brilla	11	(2)
2013	WV King's Warriors	11	(7)
2014–2015	San Antonio Scorpions	50	(10)
2016	Rayo OKC	30	(3)
2017	San Antonio FC	31	(10)
2018	Phoenix Rising	20	(3)
2019	San Antonio FC	23	(3)
2020	Austin Bold	16	(7)
2021	Miami FC	25	(7)
2022	Detroit City	5	(0)
2022	→ Valour FC (loan)	12	(2)
2023	Central Valley Fuego	20	(1)
2023–2025	SWA Sharks		

International career
2008–2025	Turks and Caicos Islands	27	(8)
- * Club domestic league appearances and goals

Cadet Billy Forbes (born 13 December 1990) is a Turks and Caicos Islander former professional footballer who played as a winger or striker for the Turks and Caicos Islands national team.

== Club career ==
Forbes spent his early career with Provopool Celtic and AFC Academy. In 2009, after training with the Vancouver Whitecaps, Forbes won a scholarship with Western Texas College. He also played college soccer for Lubbock Christian University.

Forbes played during the summer of 2012 for the Mississippi Brilla of the USL PDL. and in May 2014 he joined San Antonio Scorpions from WV King's Warriors.

The San Antonio Scorpions organization ceased operations following the 2015 NASL season. Forbes signed with NASL expansion side Rayo OKC on 28 January 2016.

After spending the 2018 season with Phoenix Rising, he returned to San Antonio FC for the 2019 season.

Forbes joined USL Championship club Austin Bold FC in January 2020.

Forbes moved to USL Championship side Miami FC on 11 January 2021.

Forbes was signed by Detroit City FC on 2 March 2022. In July 2022 he was loaned to Canadian Premier League side Valour FC. He left Detroit following their 2022 season.

On 3 May 2023, Forbes signed with USL League One side Central Valley Fuego.

After spending time with SWA Sharks, Forbes announced his retirement in August 2025.

== International career ==
He made his debut for the Turks and Caicos Islands in a February 2008 World Cup qualification match against Saint Lucia.

== Career statistics ==
=== Club ===
As of 6 November 2021

Appearances and goals by club, season and competition
Club	Season	League			U.S. Open Cup		Other		Total	
Club	Season	Division	Apps	Goals	Apps	Goals	Apps	Goals	Apps	Goals
San Antonio Scorpions	2014	NASL	23	5	2	0	0	0	25	5
San Antonio Scorpions	2015	NASL	27	5	1	0	0	0	28	5
San Antonio Scorpions	Total		50	10	3	0	0	0	53	10
Rayo OKC	2016	NASL	30	3	1	1	0	0	31	4
San Antonio FC	2017	USL	31	10	1	0	2	0	34	10
Phoenix Rising FC	2018	USL	20	3	0	0	4	0	24	3
San Antonio FC	2019	USLC	23	3	2	0	0	0	25	3
Austin Bold FC	2020	USLC	16	7	—		0	0	16	7
Miami FC	2021	USLC	25	7	—		1	0	26	7
Career total			195	43	7	1	7	0	209	44

=== International ===
Appearances and goals by national team and year
National team	Year	Apps	Goals
Turks and Caicos Islands	2008	2	0
Turks and Caicos Islands	2009	0	0
Turks and Caicos Islands	2010	0	0
Turks and Caicos Islands	2011	2	0
Turks and Caicos Islands	2012	0	0
Turks and Caicos Islands	2013	0	0
Turks and Caicos Islands	2014	0	0
Turks and Caicos Islands	2015	2	1
Turks and Caicos Islands	2016	0	0
Turks and Caicos Islands	2017	0	0
Turks and Caicos Islands	2018	3	2
Turks and Caicos Islands	2019	1	1
Turks and Caicos Islands	2020	0	0
Turks and Caicos Islands	2021	3	0
Turks and Caicos Islands	2022	2	0
Turks and Caicos Islands	2023	5	3
Turks and Caicos Islands	2024	6	1
Total		26	8

Scores and results list Turks and Caicos Islands' goal tally first, score column indicates score after each Forbes goal.

List of international goals scored by Billy Forbes
No.	Date	Venue	Opponent	Score	Result	Competition	Ref.
1	23 March 2015	Warner Park Sporting Complex, Basseterre, Saint Kitts and Nevis	Saint Kitts and Nevis	1–1	2–6	2018 FIFA World Cup qualification	
2	18 November 2018	TCIFA National Academy, Providenciales, Turks and Caicos Islands	Saint Vincent and the Grenadines	1–0	3–2	2019–20 CONCACAF Nations League qualifying	
3	18 November 2018	TCIFA National Academy, Providenciales, Turks and Caicos Islands	Saint Vincent and the Grenadines	2–0	3–2	2019–20 CONCACAF Nations League qualifying	
4	21 March 2019	Raymond E. Guishard Technical Centre, The Valley, Anguilla	British Virgin Islands	1–2	2–2	2019–20 CONCACAF Nations League qualifying	
5	9 September 2023	A. O. Shirley Recreation Ground, Road Town, British Virgin Islands	British Virgin Islands	1–2	1–3	2023–24 CONCACAF Nations League C	
6	16 October 2023	TCIFA National Academy, Providenciales, Turks and Caicos Islands	British Virgin Islands	1–1	2–2	2023–24 CONCACAF Nations League C	
7	16 October 2023	TCIFA National Academy, Providenciales, Turks and Caicos Islands	British Virgin Islands	2–1	2–2	2023–24 CONCACAF Nations League C	
8	26 March 2024	TCIFA National Academy, Providenciales, Turks and Caicos Islands	Anguilla	1–0	1–1	2026 FIFA World Cup qualification	
