= Juan Gabriel Guzmán =

Costa Rican footballer (born 1987)

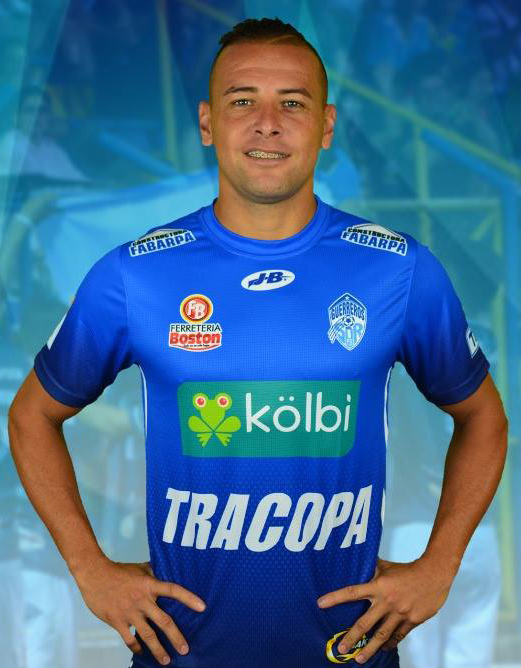
- Guzmán in 2017

Personal information
- Full name: Juan Gabriel Guzmán Otárola
- Date of birth: 17 June 1987 (age 39)
- Place of birth: San Isidro de El General, Costa Rica
- Position: Midfielder

Senior career*
Years	Team	Apps	(Gls)
-2010	A.D. Municipal Pérez Zeledón	31+	(6)
2010-2015	Liga Deportiva Alajuelense	123	(7)
2015-2016	C.S. Cartaginés	22	(0)
2016-2018	A.D. Municipal Pérez Zeledón	51	(1)
2018-2020	Deportivo Saprissa	26	(0)
2020-	A.D. Municipal Pérez Zeledón	19	(0)
- * Club domestic league appearances and goals

Juan Gabriel Guzmán Otárola (born 17 June 1987) is a Costa Rican footballer.
