= Bob Finley (missionary) =

American missionary (1922–2019)

Robert V. Finley
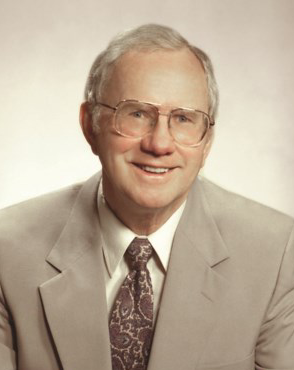
- Born: 1922; Charlottesville, Virginia
- Died: 2019 (aged 96–97)
- Education: University of Virginia

Robert Finley (1922 – March 22, 2019) was an American missionary to Korea, Japan and China, who founded International Students and Christian Aid Mission. He was an early pioneer and champion of what became known as indigenous or native missions, advocating that missionaries nearest to those who need the gospel are the most effective.

== Early life ==
Finley was born in Charlottesville, Virginia, in 1922 and attended the University of Virginia. While a student there, he became involved in evangelism on campus and founded a large student ministry. In his senior year, he became the national inter-collegiate boxing champion. His fame as a Christian athlete drew large crowds to Youth for Christ rallies, where he served alongside Billy Graham as a field evangelist for the new ministry.

After World War II, Bob went to the Far East to hold large evangelistic meetings with Youth for Christ and was personally supported by Billy Graham. While serving in Korea, China and Japan, Bob caught a vision for supporting native evangelists, which he observed to be far more effective than foreigners.

== Career ==
In 1953, Bob founded International Students to reach college students from other countries who were coming to the United States to study. He believed that by reaching these elite students, the gospel could be advanced in almost every country. As part of this strategy, Bob formed a division called Christian AID (Assisting Indigenous Developments) to help finance the ministry work of returning students to their country. By 1970, this division had grown to such an extent that it was spun off into a separate organization. Both ministries have grown considerably and become household names in evangelical Christian circles.
