= Daniel Fernandes (footballer) =

Portuguese footballer (born 1983)

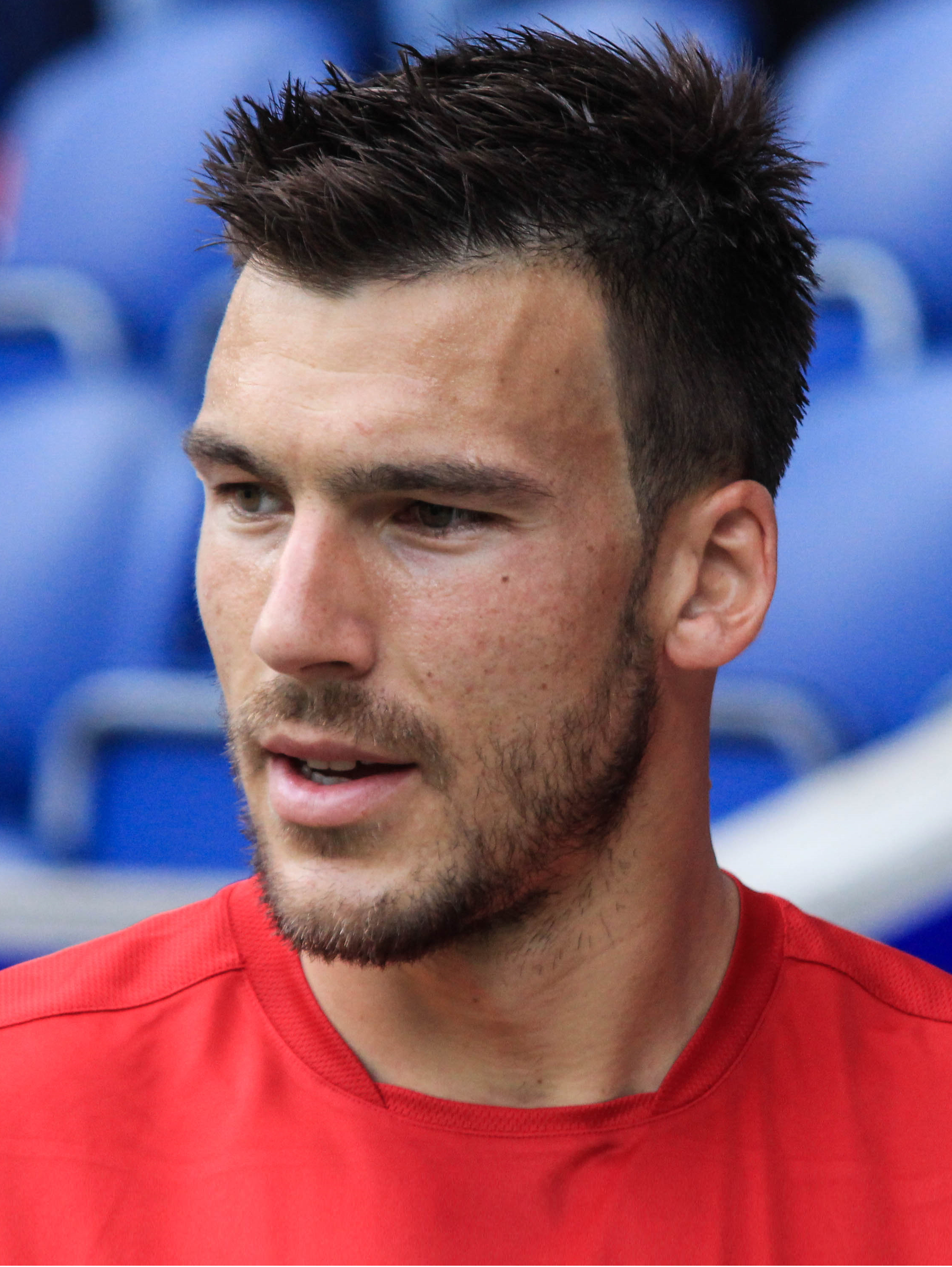
- Fernandes with Twente in 2012

Personal information
- Full name: Daniel Márcio Fernandes
- Date of birth: 25 September 1983 (age 43)
- Place of birth: Edmonton, Canada
- Height: 1.96 m (6 ft 5 in)
- Position: Goalkeeper

Youth career
- Vancouver Olympics
- 2000–2001: Porto

Senior career*
Years	Team	Apps	(Gls)
2001–2002	Porto B	0	(0)
2002–2003	Celta B	0	(0)
2003	→ Jahn Regensburg II (loan)	12	(0)
2004–2008	PAOK	90	(0)
2008–2011	VfL Bochum	32	(0)
2010	→ Iraklis (loan)	10	(0)
2010–2011	→ Panathinaikos (loan)	0	(0)
2011	→ Panserraikos (loan)	7	(0)
2011	CFR Cluj	2	(0)
2012–2016	Twente	0	(0)
2013–2014	→ OFI (loan)	21	(0)
2014–2015	→ Panthrakikos (loan)	4	(0)
2015	→ San Antonio Scorpions (loan)	14	(0)
2016	Rayo OKC	31	(0)
2017	Lillestrøm	3	(0)
2018–2020	Farense	18	(0)
2020–2021	Tarxien Rainbows	16	(0)
2021–2022	Birkirkara	15	(0)
2022	Gudja United	0	(0)
Total		275	(0)

International career
2002–2003	Canada U20	6	(0)
2006	Portugal U21	2	(0)
2007–2009	Portugal	2	(0)
- * Club domestic league appearances and goals

Daniel Márcio Fernandes (born 25 September 1983) is a former professional footballer who played as a goalkeeper.

He moved frequently in his club career, representing teams in Portugal, Spain, Germany, Greece, Romania, the Netherlands, the United States, Norway and Malta.

Internationally, Fernandes played for Canada at under-20 level before switching allegiance to Portugal, and was called up for their senior team at the 2010 World Cup.

== Early life ==
The son of a Portuguese father and a Czechoslovak mother, Fernandes was born in Edmonton, Alberta, being raised in East Vancouver, British Columbia. His first club was the Vancouver Olympics.

== Club career ==
=== Early days ===
In 2000, aged 17, Fernandes returned to the land of his father and joined FC Porto's youth system. In his first two years as a senior he only managed to appear for the reserves, his second team being Celta de Vigo B in Spain.

In January 2003, the Galicians loaned Fernandes to 2. Bundesliga side SSV Jahn Regensburg, but again failed to appear officially for the main squad, returning in June to Celta and being released from contract.

=== PAOK ===
After a successful trial, Fernandes signed with PAOK FC, totalling four Super League Greece games in his first two seasons. In 2005, the team's general manager – and former player – Giorgos Kostikos took over after coach Nikos Karageorgiou was dismissed following a bad string of results. He immediately replaced ageing Kyriakos Tohouroglou in his starting XI with the Portuguese.

Despite many problems both inside and outside the pitch, PAOK managed to finish in sixth place in the 2005–06 campaign, with Fernandes making 27 appearances as the Thessaloniki club qualified for the UEFA Cup, only to be disqualified shortly after for irregularities. He remained first choice for the remainder of his spell.

=== VfL Bochum ===
On 23 May 2008, after extensive negotiations, PAOK accepted an offer from VfL Bochum, who signed Fernandes for a fee of approximately €1.2 million, with the player reuniting at the German side with former teammate Marcin Mięciel.

Fernandes made his Bundesliga debut on 16 August 2008, in a 1–0 away loss against Karlsruher SC. He only missed three league matches in his first season, as the North Rhine-Westphalia team retained their top-division status after finishing 14th.

In 2009–10, Fernandes was relegated to the bench by Philipp Heerwagen and, on 18 January 2010, he was loaned to Iraklis F.C. until the end of the campaign. In the summer, he signed on loan with another Greek side, Panathinaikos FC, who retained an option to buy.

Fernandes moved to Panserraikos F.C. in January 2011, again on loan. He appeared sparingly as the team were relegated from the top tier, and was released by Bochum in June.

=== Cluj and Twente ===
On 16 August 2011, Fernandes joined Romania's CFR Cluj. He was released after five months, in which he played just two games.

Fernandes moved teams and countries again on 17 January 2012, signing a two-year contract with FC Twente in the Eredivisie and competing with Nikolay Mihaylov for the no.1 position. He spent the following seasons on loan, with OFI Crete F.C. and Panthrakikos FC.

=== North America ===
On 3 August 2015, Fernandes moved to the San Antonio Scorpions on loan from Twente. After the former ceased operations following the 2015 NASL season, he joined manager Alen Marcina as both signed with Rayo OKC on 2 February 2016.

=== Return to Europe ===
For the second consecutive time, Fernandes' American club folded, and he signed for Norwegian Eliteserien team Lillestrøm SK on a one-year deal in January 2017. In May he failed a doping test when he tested positive for dextroamphetamine, and was frozen out of the squad while his representatives appealed on the basis that the drug was prescribed medicine for his attention deficit hyperactivity disorder and worthy of a medical exemption.

On 1 July 2018, the 34-year-old Fernandes returned to Portuguese club football for the first time in 16 years, joining S.C. Farense for their upcoming season back in LigaPro. He made his debut for the Algarveans – his first professional appearance in the country – on 11 August, in a 1–0 home win over F.C. Famalicão.

Fernandes' side achieved promotion to the Primeira Liga at the end of the following campaign, but he played no league matches in the process. In August 2020, he signed a one-year contract with Tarxien Rainbows F.C. of the Maltese Premier League. At its conclusion, he joined Birkirkara F.C. in the same league.

== International career ==
Fernandes won caps for Canada at under-20 level. He then changed to play for the country of his father, Portugal, and made his under-21 debut in 2006.

Fernandes received his first senior call-up in November 2006, as third goalkeeper behind Ricardo and Quim. In May of the following year, he was selected for a UEFA Euro 2008 qualifier against Belgium and a friendly with Kuwait, making his debut in the latter after replacing Quim in the 66th minute of a 1–1 draw.

On 11 February 2009, Fernandes played his second international match, substituting Eduardo at the hour-mark of a 1–0 win against Finland. In May 2010 he was named in the 23-man squad for that year's FIFA World Cup, but did not appear in the tournament held in South Africa.

== Career statistics ==
=== Club ===
As of 26 February 2021

Appearances and goals by club, season and competition
Club	Season	League			Cup		Continental		Other		Total	
Club	Season	Division	Apps	Goals	Apps	Goals	Apps	Goals	Apps	Goals	Apps	Goals
Porto B	2001–02	Segunda Divisão	0	0	0	0	0	0	0	0	0	0
Celta B	2002–03	Segunda División B	0	0	0	0	0	0	0	0	0	0
Jahn Regensburg	2003–04	2. Bundesliga	0	0	0	0	0	0	0	0	0	0
PAOK	2004–05	Super League Greece	4	0	1	0	0	0	0	0	5	0
PAOK	2005–06	Super League Greece	27	0	1	0	5	0	0	0	33	0
PAOK	2006–07	Super League Greece	29	0	3	0	0	0	0	0	32	0
PAOK	2007–08	Super League Greece	30	0	0	0	0	0	0	0	30	0
PAOK	Total		90	0	5	0	5	0	0	0	100	0
VfL Bochum	2008–09	Bundesliga	31	0	2	0	0	0	0	0	33	0
VfL Bochum	2009–10	Bundesliga	1	0	0	0	0	0	0	0	1	0
VfL Bochum	Total		32	0	2	0	0	0	0	0	34	0
Iraklis (loan)	2009–10	Super League Greece	10	0	0	0	0	0	0	0	10	0
Panserraikos (loan)	2010–11	Super League Greece	7	0	0	0	0	0	0	0	7	0
Panathinaikos (loan)	2010–11	Super League Greece	0	0	0	0	0	0	0	0	0	0
CFR Cluj	2011–12	Liga I	2	0	0	0	0	0	0	0	2	0
Twente	2011–12	Eredivisie	0	0	0	0	0	0	1	0	1	0
Twente	2012–13	Eredivisie	0	0	0	0	1	0	4	0	5	0
Twente	Total		0	0	0	0	1	0	5	0	6	0
OFI (loan)	2013–14	Super League Greece	21	0	7	0	0	0	0	0	28	0
Panthrakikos (loan)	2013–14	Super League Greece	4	0	0	0	0	0	0	0	4	0
San Antonio Scorpions (loan)	2015	North American Soccer League	14	0	0	0	0	0	0	0	14	0
Rayo OKC	2016	North American Soccer League	31	0	1	0	0	0	0	0	32	0
Lillestrøm	2017	Eliteserien	3	0	0	0	0	0	0	0	3	0
Farense	2018–19	LigaPro	18	0	0	0	0	0	1	0	19	0
Farense	2019–20	LigaPro	0	0	3	0	0	0	0	0	3	0
Farense	Total		18	0	3	0	0	0	1	0	22	0
Tarxien Rainbows	2020–21	Maltese Premier League	14	0	1	0	0	0	0	0	15	0
Career total			246	0	18	0	6	0	6	0	276	0

=== International ===
Appearances and goals by national team and year
National team	Year	Apps	Goals
Portugal	2007	1	0
Portugal	2009	1	0
Total		2	0

== Honours ==
CFR Cluj

- Liga I: 2011–12

Individual

- PAOK MVP of the Season: 2007–08
