= Michel (footballer, born 9 June 1981) =

Brazilian footballer

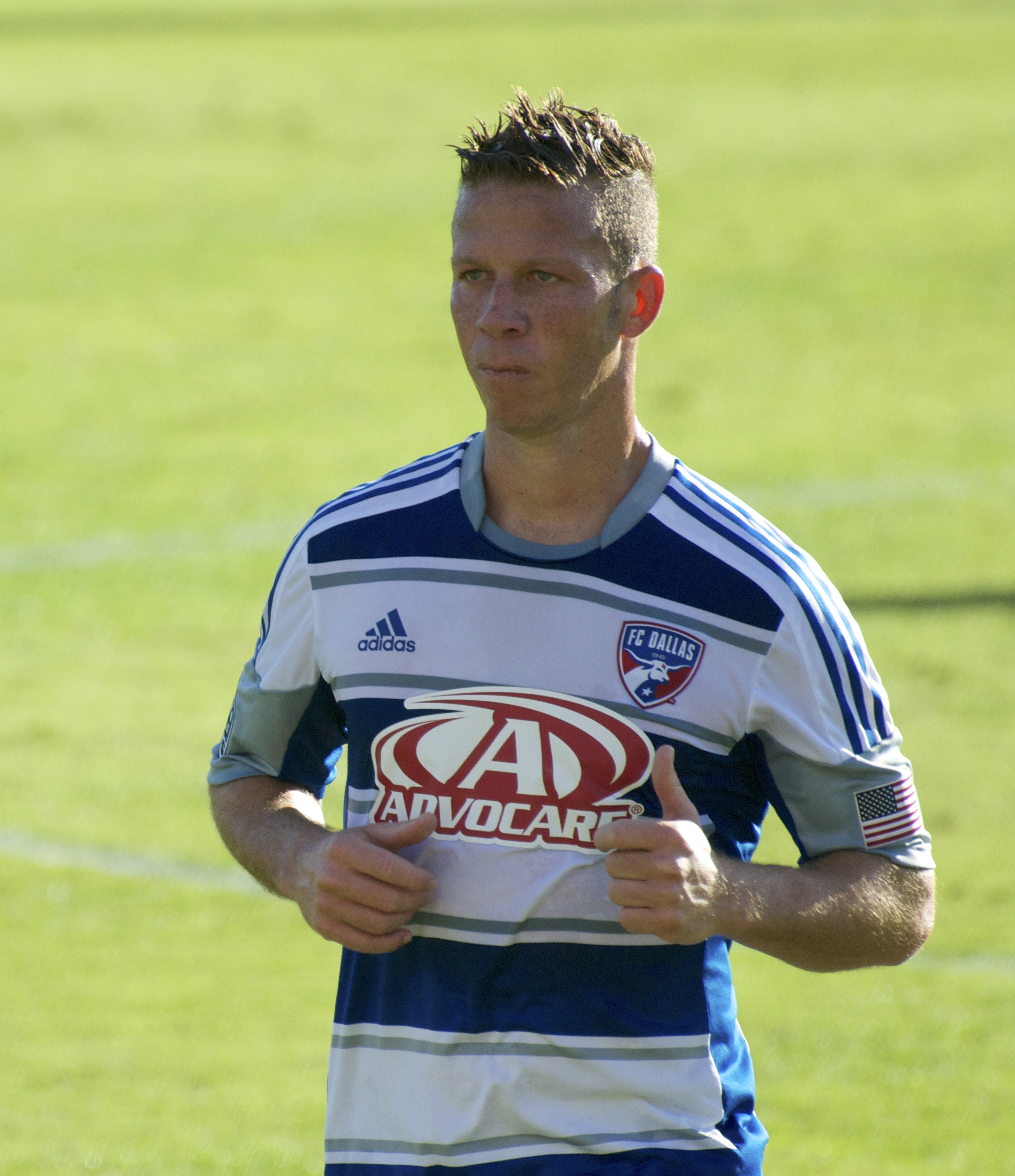

Personal information
- Full name: Michel Garbini Pereira
- Date of birth: 9 June 1981 (age 45)
- Place of birth: Vitória, Brazil
- Height: 1.87 m (6 ft 2 in)
- Positions: Midfielder; left back

Youth career
- Atlético Mineiro

Senior career*
Years	Team	Apps	(Gls)
2000–2004	Atlético Mineiro	47	(5)
2004–2006	Standard Liège	27	(2)
2006–2009	Atlético Paranaense	33	(4)
2009	Náutico	20	(1)
2010	Vila Nova	2	(0)
2010–2012	Aris	52	(0)
2013–2015	FC Dallas	74	(12)
2016	Rayo OKC	28	(14)
2017	Miami FC	15	(1)
2018	Dallas Elite FC	8	
2019	Dallas Sidekicks (indoor)	8	(2)
2019	North Texas	1	(0)

International career
2003	Brazil U23	4	(0)

Managerial career
- 2019–2024: North Texas (assistant)
- 2024: North Texas (interim head coach)
- 2025–: FC Dallas (assistant)
- * Club domestic league appearances and goals as of 1 July 2020

Michel Garbini Pereira (born 9 June 1981), commonly known as Michel, is a retired Brazilian footballer who currently serves as assistant coach for Major League Soccer club FC Dallas.

== Playing career ==
=== Club ===
Michel began his career at Atlético Mineiro, before moving to Belgian Pro League side Standard Liège in 2004. After two seasons, Michel returned to Brazil and signed with Campeonato Brasileiro Série A outfit Atlético Paranaense. Subsequently, he played for Náutico and Vila Nova.

In 2010, Michel moved to Super League Greece club Aris, where he immediately established himself as a regular in the team. In the 2010–11 season, he played in almost all of the matches for Aris, including all twelve Europa League games.

After impressing as a trialist during preseason training camp, Michel signed for Major League Soccer club FC Dallas on 19 February 2013. During his time with the club, he became known as a threat on set pieces with his left foot. He scored his first MLS goal directly from a corner kick during a 4–2 loss at Seattle Sounders FC on 18 May 2013. Although he originally came to the club as a left back, he eventually earned most of his playing time at defensive midfielder. Due to the emergence of Victor Ulloa and Kellyn Acosta, Michel's playing time was limited in 2015. After the season, his contract option was declined by the club.

Michel joined expansion club Rayo OKC of the North American Soccer League in January 2016. He was later named team captain.

=== International ===
Michel played for Brazil's Under-23 squad in 2003 making four appearances for the squad.

== Coaching career ==
Following his retirement as a player, Michel worked as an assistant coach for North Texas SC from 2019 to 2023 before taking over as interim head coaching in 2024.

In January 2025, FC Dallas announced they had hired Michel as an assistant under coach Eric Quill.
