= Julio García (Mexican footballer) =

Mexican footballer (born 1989)

Julio César García Jiménez
Personal information
- Date of birth: July 17, 1989 (age 37)
- Place of birth: Ocotlán, Jalisco, Mexico
- Height: 1.84 m (6 ft 0 in)
- Position: Midfielder

Youth career
- Atlas

Senior career*
Years	Team	Apps	(Gls)
2009–2010	Oro	18	(7)
2014–2015	San Antonio Scorpions	1	(0)
- * Club domestic league appearances and goals as of October 15, 2015

Julio César García Jiménez (born July 17, 1989) is a Mexican footballer who most recently played for San Antonio Scorpions.

== Club career ==
García played for Oro and signed with North American Soccer League side San Antonio Scorpions in 2014 after spending time with the reserve side of Chivas USA. In December 2015, San Antonio ceased operations.
