= Pecka (footballer) =

Brazilian footballer

Personal information
- Full name: Wellington de Jorge Estanislau Paeckart
- Date of birth: 2 May 1989 (age 37)
- Place of birth: Rio de Janeiro, Brazil
- Height: 1.72 m (5 ft 8 in)
- Position: Defensive midfielder

Youth career
- 2007–2009: Flamengo

Senior career*
Years	Team	Apps	(Gls)
2009–2010	Flamengo	2	(0)
2010	→ CFZ (loan)	2	(0)
2011–2014	Fort Lauderdale Strikers	70	(3)
2014	→ Madureira Esporte Clube (loan)	3	(0)
2015	Real Salt Lake	4	(0)
2015	→ Real Monarchs (loan)	6	(0)
2016	Rayo OKC	21	(1)
2017–2019	San Antonio FC	68	(3)
2020–2023	North Carolina FC	53	(1)

International career
2007	Brazil U18	5	(0)
- * Club domestic league appearances and goals

Wellington de Jorge Estanislau Paeckart, better known as Pecka (born 2 May 1989), is a Brazilian former professional footballer who played as a defensive midfielder.

== Career ==
=== Flamengo ===
Wellington Jorge Paeckart Stanislaus is a defensive midfielder who started his career at Flamengo, training in the first team in 2009, under the orders of the coach Andrade, and in 2010 after training with the first team, was loaned to CFZ in 2010, which is the club founded by Flamengo's greatest idol, Zico, however, later in the year Pecka returned to Flamengo.

=== Fort Lauderdale Strikers ===
On 22 August 2011, Pecka signed with the Fort Lauderdale Strikers. He scored his first goal for the club on 8 September 2012, in a 1–1 draw with the Puerto Rico Islanders. On 22 January 2014, Fort Lauderdale announced they had picked up the contract of Pecka and sent him on a three-month loan to Madureira Esporte Clube.

=== Real Salt Lake ===
Pecka was signed by Major League Soccer club Real Salt Lake on 16 January 2015. He was released following the 2015 season.

=== Rayo OKC ===
On 15 January 2016, Pecka was announced as one of the first three signings by NASL expansion side Rayo OKC.

=== San Antonio FC ===
Pecka signed with San Antonio FC on 18 January 2017, after Rayo OKC ceased operations in the NASL.

=== North Carolina FC ===
After three seasons in San Antonio, in 24 December 2020. Pecka joined North Carolina FC on a free transfer. Who are a part of the USL Championship.

== Career statistics ==
As of 14 June 2013

Appearances and goals by club, season and competition
Club	Season	League		Cup		Playoffs		Total	
Club	Season	Apps	Goals	Apps	Goals	Apps	Goals	Apps	Goals
Fort Lauderdale Strikers	2011	4	0	—	—	4	0	8	0
Fort Lauderdale Strikers	2012	24	1	2	0	1	0	27	1
Fort Lauderdale Strikers	2013	17	0	2	0	—	—	19	0
Fort Lauderdale Strikers	2014	15	2	1	0	2	0	18	2
Career total		60	3	5	0	7	0	72	3
