= Moisés Hernández =

Professional footballer

Personal information
- Full name: Moisés Hernández
- Date of birth: March 5, 1992 (age 34)
- Place of birth: Dallas, Texas, United States
- Height: 1.83 m (6 ft 0 in)
- Position: Left-back

Team information
- Current team: Dallas Sidekicks
- Number: 2

Youth career
- 2008–2010: FC Dallas

Senior career*
Years	Team	Apps	(Gls)
2010–2016	FC Dallas	33	(0)
2012	→ Comunicaciones (loan)	4	(0)
2013	→ Saprissa (loan)	20	(0)
2016	→ Rayo OKC (loan)	26	(1)
2017–2018	Comunicaciones	46	(0)
2018–2019	FC Dallas	0	(0)
2018–2019	→ San Antonio FC (loan)	25	(1)
2020–2021	Antigua	49	(0)
2021–2022	Municipal	37	(3)
2023	Miami FC	19	(0)
2023	Dallas Sidekicks (indoor)	15	(5)
2024	Foro SC	0	(0)
2025	Des Moines Menace	0	(0)

International career^{‡}
2010–2011	United States U20	2	(0)
2015–2020	Guatemala	36	(2)
- * Club domestic league appearances and goals as of 27 November 2024 ‡ National team caps and goals as of 9 September 23:18 (UTC+2)

Moisés "Mo" Hernández (born March 5, 1992) is a professional footballer who plays as a defender for the Dallas Sidekicks in the Major Arena Soccer League. Born in the United States, he played for the Guatemala national team.

== Club career ==
=== FC Dallas ===
Hernández was signed as a Homegrown Player by FC Dallas on July 30, 2010. He made his professional debut with the club on May 30, 2012, when he came on as a 24th-minute substitute for team-mate Zach Loyd in a US Open Cup match against the Charlotte Eagles.

==== 2012–13: Loan spells at Comunicaciones and Saprissa ====
Hernández was loaned to Guatemalan club Comunicaciones on June 20, 2012, for the remainder of the 2012 MLS season. In January 2013, he was loaned to Deportivo Saprissavof the Costa Rican First Division (UNAFUT).

==== 2014: League debut ====
Hernández made his Major League Soccer (MLS) regular season debut in the 2014 season opener with a start at center back.

Hernández was sent on a season long loan to North American Soccer League side Rayo OKC on April 29, 2016.

On January 24, 2017, FC Dallas announced the club and Hernández had agreed to part ways, due to the uncertain nature of his future with the club.

=== Return to Comunicaciones ===
He returned to Comunicaciones permanently.

=== Return to FC Dallas ===
On July 31, 2018, Hernandez signed a contract to return to FC Dallas. On September 6, 2018, he was loaned to San Antonio FC.

Hernandez was released by Dallas at the end of their 2019 season.

=== Antigua ===
On 31 December 2019, Hernández returned to Guatemala and joined Antigua GFC.

=== Miami FC ===
Hernández signed with Miami FC of the USL Championship on 19 January 2023.

=== Dallas Sidekicks ===
Hernández joined the Dallas Sidekicks of the Major Arena Soccer League in December 2023.

=== Foro SC ===
After a spell with United Premier Soccer League side Foro SC in the Lamar Hunt US Open Cup, Hernandez retired from playing soccer on 29 August 2024.

== International career ==
Hernández' performances in MLS allowed him to gain the attention of the Guatemalan National Team, which began calling him up beginning in 2015 including for the 2015 CONCACAF Gold Cup.

== Career statistics ==
=== International goals ===
No.	Date	Venue	Opponent	Score	Result	Competition
1.	4 June 2021	Estadio Doroteo Guamuch Flores, Guatemala City, Guatemala	Saint Vincent and the Grenadines	4–0	10–0	2022 FIFA World Cup qualification
