= Marvin Chávez =

Honduran footballer (born 1983)

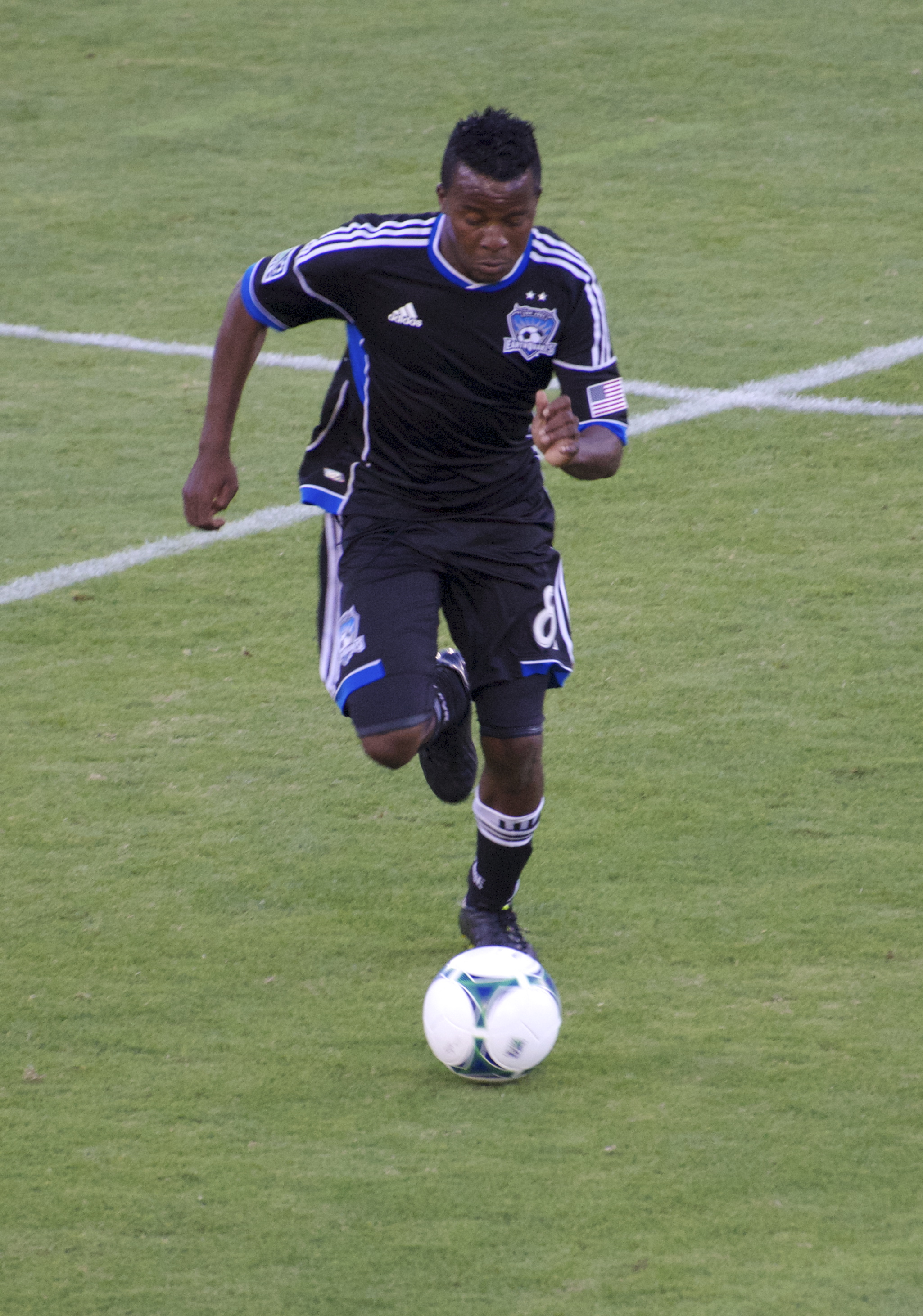

Personal information
- Full name: Marvin Antonio Chávez
- Date of birth: November 3, 1983 (age 42)
- Place of birth: La Ceiba, Honduras
- Height: 5 ft 5 in (1.65 m)
- Position: Winger

Senior career*
Years	Team	Apps	(Gls)
2005–2008	Victoria	26	(6)
2008–2010	Marathón	22	(6)
2009–2010	→ FC Dallas (loan)	27	(3)
2011	FC Dallas	32	(6)
2012–2013	San Jose Earthquakes	42	(4)
2014	Colorado Rapids	2	(0)
2014	Chivas USA	14	(2)
2015	San Antonio Scorpions	27	(4)
2016	Rayo OKC	8	(1)
2017	Marathón	1	(0)
2021	Cedrito FC	0	(0)

International career^{‡}
2006–2014	Honduras	48	(4)
Medal record
Honduras
Third place	UNCAF Nations Cup	2009
- * Club domestic league appearances and goals as of 28 September 2017 ‡ National team caps and goals as of 4 April 2015

Marvin Antonio Chávez (born November 3, 1983) is a Honduran former footballer who played as a midfielder.

== Career ==
=== Club ===
Chávez – who is nicknamed "el hijo del viento" (the son of the wind) – spent the early part of his professional career playing in Honduras for Victoria and Marathón. He signed with FC Dallas of Major League Soccer (MLS) on a loan deal in August 2009. During the 2010 season, he became an important player for Dallas helping the club reach the MLS Cup final. On November 21, 2010, he played 105 minutes in MLS Cup 2010 in which his club fell to Colorado Rapids. Chávez continued his fine play during the 2011 MLS season and was named to the MLS Team of the Week for weeks 10 and 12 after goal-scoring performances against Real Salt Lake and the New England Revolution. He gained Team of the Week honors again in week 19 against the New York Red Bulls.

On December 16, 2011, Chávez was traded to the San Jose Earthquakes in exchange for allocation money. He had a breakout season in 2012 for San Jose as he made 27 league appearances and recorded 3 goals and 13 assists in helping his new club capture the 2012 Supporters Shield. His stay in San Jose ended on January 7, 2014, when he was traded to the Colorado Rapids in exchange for his former FC Dallas teammate Atiba Harris. Colorado was not a good fit for Chávez. He played only 39 minutes for the club before being traded to Chivas USA on May 8, 2014, in exchange for Luke Moore.

On February 26, 2015, Chávez signed with NASL side San Antonio Scorpions. He played 27 matches for the Scorpions before the club ceased operations in December 2015. In February 2016, Chávez signed with expansion team Rayo OKC of the NASL.

=== International ===
Chávez made his debut for Honduras in an August 2006 friendly match against Venezuela. As of April 2015, he has earned a total of 48 caps while scoring four goals. He has represented his country in FIFA World Cup qualification matches, the 2009 and 2011 UNCAF Nations Cups, the 2009 and 2013 CONCACAF Gold Cups, and the 2014 FIFA World Cup.

== Career statistics ==
=== International goals ===
Scores and results list Honduras' goal tally first.

N.	Date	Venue	Opponent	Score	Result	Competition
1.	26 January 2009	Estadio Tiburcio Carías Andino, Tegucigalpa, Honduras	El Salvador	2–0	2–0	2009 UNCAF Nations Cup
2.	21 January 2011	Estadio Rommel Fernández, Panama City, Panama	El Salvador	2–0	2–0	2011 Copa Centroamericana
3.	7 September 2012	Estadio Pedro Marrero, Havana, Cuba	Cuba	3–0	3–0	2014 World Cup qualification
4.	8 July 2013	Red Bull Arena, Harrison, USA	Haiti	2–0	2–0	2013 CONCACAF Gold Cup

== Personal life ==
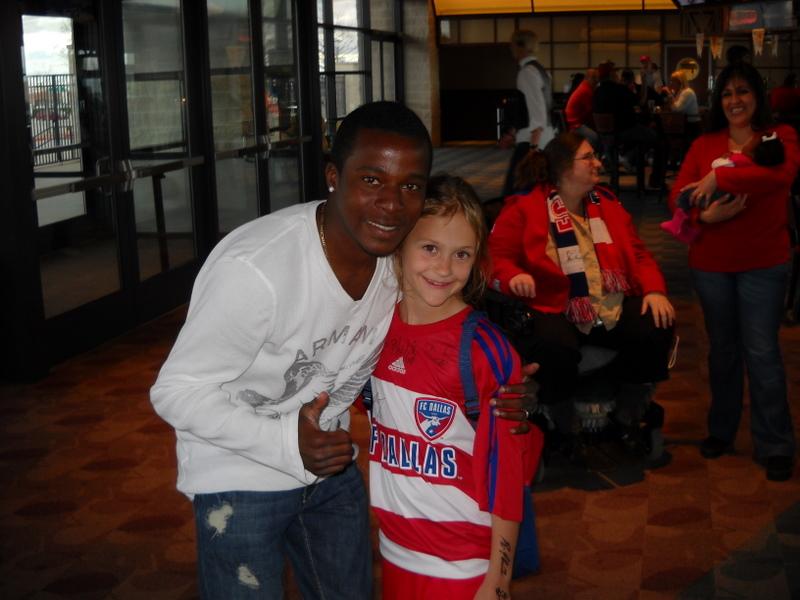
Chávez (left) with a young fan while at FC Dallas

Chávez earned his U.S. green card in January 2013. This status qualifies him as a domestic player for MLS roster purposes.

== Honours ==
FC Dallas

- Major League Soccer Western Conference Playoff Championship: 2010

San Jose Earthquakes

- Major League Soccer Supporters Shield: 2012
- Major League Soccer Western Conference Regular Season Championship: 2012
