= Richard Menjívar =

Salvadoran international footballer (born 1990)

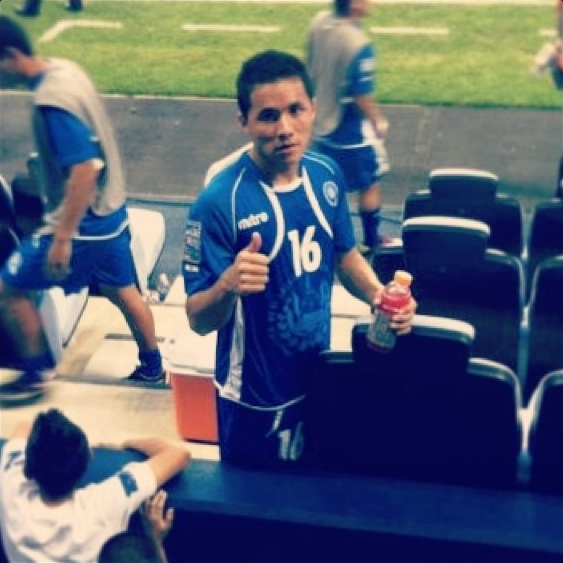

Personal information
- Full name: Richard Guillermo Menjívar Peraza
- Date of birth: October 31, 1990 (age 36)
- Place of birth: Panorama City, California, United States
- Height: 1.73 m (5 ft 8 in)
- Position: Midfielder

Youth career
- 2006–2008: Los Angeles FC

College career
Years	Team	Apps	(Gls)
2008–2009	Evansville Purple Aces	38	(1)
2010–2011	Cal State Bakersfield Roadrunners		

Senior career*
Years	Team	Apps	(Gls)
2012	Cal FC		
2012–2013	Blokhus		
2013	Atlanta Silverbacks	21	(2)
2014–2015	San Antonio Scorpions	18	(0)
2015	Tampa Bay Rowdies	13	(1)
2016	Rayo OKC	30	(0)
2017	New York Cosmos	6	(0)
2018	Penn FC	31	(0)
2019–2020	CD Águila		
2021–	Chalatenango		

International career^{‡}
2008	United States U18	4	(0)
2012	El Salvador U23	4	(1)
2013–	El Salvador	41	(1)
- * Club domestic league appearances and goals as of 13:52, 15 October 2018 (UTC) ‡ National team caps and goals as of 9 April 2018

Richard "Richie" Guillermo Menjívar Peraza (born October 31, 1990) is a professional footballer who plays as a midfielder. Born in the United States, he represented the El Salvador national team.

== Career ==
After spending his college career at University of Evansville and Cal State Bakersfield, Menjívar spent time with amateur side Cal FC during their dramatic 2012 Lamar Hunt U.S. Open Cup run which saw them defeat Kitsap Pumas, Wilmington Hammerheads and Portland Timbers before suffering a 5–0 defeat to Seattle Sounders FC in the Round of 16.

On 8 February 2013, Menjívar joined the Atlanta Silverbacks of the NASL, helping the team win the 2013 Spring Championship. At the end of the entire season, he was awarded a spot on the league's 2013 best XI.

In February 2014, after trialing with the Portland Timbers, he signed with the San Antonio Scorpions.

On April 29, 2015, Menjívar was traded to the Tampa Bay Rowdies in exchange for defender Brad Rusin. Menjivar's contract with the Rowdies expired on December 16, 2015.

Menjívar signed with NASL expansion team Rayo OKC on February 25, 2016.

== International ==
Menjívar has represented the United States in the under-18 level and was also on El Salvador's Olympic Qualifying roster in 2012.

On January 18, 2013, Menjívar made his senior debut for El Salvador in their opening match of the 2013 Copa Centroamericana which resulted in a 1–1 draw with Honduras. On September 7, 2014, he scored his first international goal against Honduras in a group stage match during the 2014 Copa Centroamericana.

=== International goals ===
N.	Date	Venue	Opponent	Score	Result	Competition
1.	3 September 2014	Cotton Bowl	Honduras	1–0	1–0	2014 Copa Centroamericana

== Honors ==
Atlanta Silverbacks

- NASL Spring Season: 2013

San Antonio Scorpions

- NASL Fall Season: 2014
- Soccer Bowl: 2014

Individual

- NASL Best XI: 2013
