= Robbie Findley =

American soccer player (born 1985)

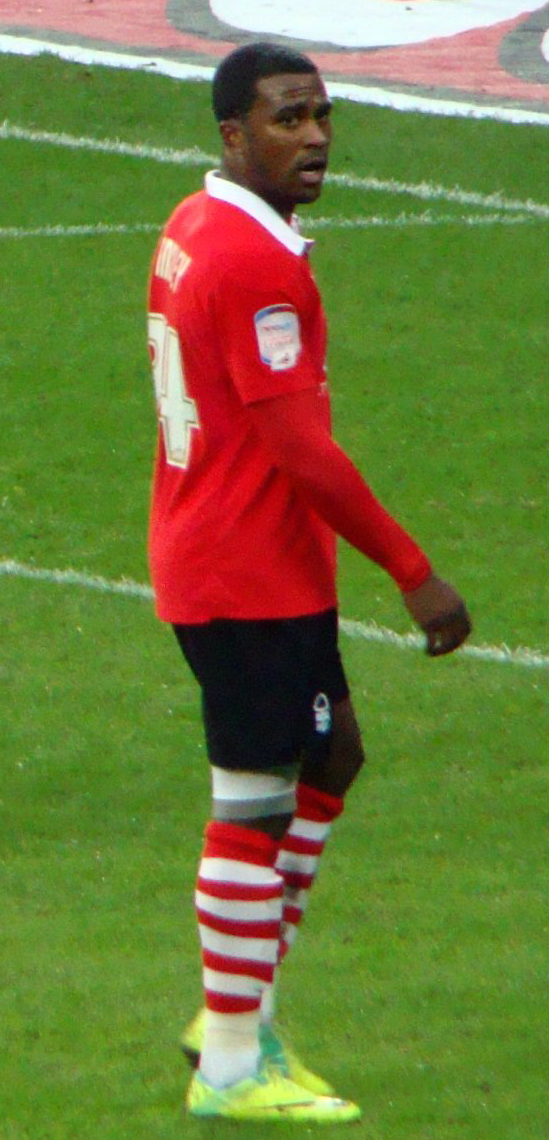
- Findley playing for Nottingham Forest

Personal information
- Full name: Robert Findley
- Date of birth: August 4, 1985 (age 41)
- Place of birth: Phoenix, Arizona, United States
- Height: 5 ft 9 in (1.75 m)
- Position: Forward

College career
Years	Team	Apps	(Gls)
2003–2006	Oregon State Beavers		

Senior career*
Years	Team	Apps	(Gls)
2005–2006	Boulder Rapids Reserve	17	(15)
2007	LA Galaxy	9	(2)
2007–2010	Real Salt Lake	96	(29)
2011–2013	Nottingham Forest	25	(3)
2012	→ Gillingham (loan)	7	(0)
2013–2014	Real Salt Lake	41	(7)
2015	Toronto FC	25	(2)
2016	Rayo OKC	20	(4)
Total		240	(62)

International career
2008	United States U23	5	(0)
2007–2010	United States	11	(0)
- * Club domestic league appearances and goals

Robert Findley (born August 4, 1985) is an American former professional soccer player who played as a forward. He was capped 11 times by the United States national team, having made his international debut in 2007.

Findley played college soccer for the Oregon State Beavers and amateur soccer for the Boulder Rapids Reserve before turning professional in 2007. He played in Major League Soccer for Los Angeles Galaxy and Real Salt Lake, before moving to English club Nottingham Forest in January 2011. After a loan at Gillingham, Findley returned to Real Salt Lake before spells with Toronto FC and Rayo OKC.

== Early and personal life ==
Born in Phoenix, Arizona, Findley attended Shadow Mountain High School, graduating in 2003. Findley is a cousin of basketball players Mike Bibby and Eddie House, and American football wide receiver Shaun McDonald. He is of Trinidadian descent.

== Club career ==
=== College and amateur ===
Findley began his career playing college soccer at Oregon State University. Later, he spent two seasons with the Boulder Rapids Reserve of the USL Premier Development League.

=== Major League Soccer ===
Findley was selected by the Los Angeles Galaxy in the second round of the 2007 MLS SuperDraft as the sixteenth pick overall.

On June 21, 2007, Findley was traded along with midfielder Nathan Sturgis to Real Salt Lake in exchange for veteran forward Chris Klein. He joined Danish Superliga side Brøndby on trial in January 2009. However, he failed to secure a contract with the club and returned to Salt Lake. In the following season, he had three multi-goal matches, including the first hat trick in franchise history.

In the 2009 MLS Cup Final, Findley scored in the 64th minute, tying the match at 1–1; Salt Lake later emerged victorious in penalty kicks, claiming the MLS Cup in one of the biggest upsets in the history of the MLS Cup final.

Findley's contract with Real Salt Lake expired at the end of the 2010 MLS season, and he announced his intentions to leave MLS and move to Europe. Despite this statement of intent, Findley was selected by Portland Timbers in the 2010 MLS Expansion Draft, enabling Portland to retain his MLS rights should he ever choose to return to the league.

=== Nottingham Forest ===
After a short trial with English club Wolverhampton Wanderers in mid-December 2010, Findley was signed as a free agent by English Championship club Nottingham Forest on December 23, 2010, subject to receiving a work permit. His work permit was approved at a F.A. hearing in London on January 15, 2011. Findley incurred a thigh injury in training shortly after joining Forest and became unavailable until Spring 2011. After several months on the sidelines, Findley finally made his debut for Forest on April 22, 2011, coming on as a substitute in a 3–2 victory over East Midlands rivals Leicester City.

Findley made his full competitive debut for Forest on August 8, 2011, in a home fixture against Notts County in the first round of the 2011–12 Football League Cup. Findley scored Forest's second goal—his first goal for the club—after having an earlier effort ruled out for offside. He also converted his penalty in the match's penalty shoot-out, which Forest won. Forest manager Steve McClaren said: "He can have a big impact in the Championship. He is as fast as lightning. He is quick, he covers a lot of ground, he works for the team, he defends when he has to and, most importantly, he can get a goal". After struggling for first-team opportunities in 2012, Findley was loaned to League Two club Gillingham on September 21, 2012, for an initial period of one month. He made his debut for Gillingham in a 2–0 away win at Port Vale, and supplied the cross for the first goal. Vale manager Micky Adams stated that "the pace of Findley scared the life out of" his team. After seven appearances for the Gills, Findley returned to Forest.

On January 14, 2013, Nottingham Forest announced that Findley's contract had been terminated by mutual consent.

=== Return to Major League Soccer ===
Following his release from Forest, Real Salt Lake acquired Findley's MLS rights from Portland in exchange for allocation money and re-signed him on January 16, 2013.

On December 1, 2014, it was announced that Salt Lake had declined their option on Findley's contract. Findley entered the 2014 MLS Re-Entry Draft on December 12, 2014, and was chosen in the first round of stage one by Toronto FC. He scored a goal in his first game for Toronto to start the 2015 season. Findley would go on to finish the season scoring 2 goals for Toronto FC.

On February 10, 2016, it was reported that Findley was no longer with Toronto FC.

=== NASL ===
On February 24, 2016, Findley signed a contract with Rayo OKC of the NASL, the second tier in the American soccer pyramid. On April 22, 2016, Findley scored his first goal for Rayo OKC in a 3–2 victory over Miami FC.

On March 6, 2018, Findley announced his retirement from professional soccer.

== International career ==
Findley made his international debut for the United States national team in October 2007 and made three appearances at the 2010 World Cup in South Africa, starting at forward for the US against England and Slovenia in the group stage of the tournament, as well as starting in the round of 16 match against Ghana.

== Career statistics ==
As of February 14, 2016

Appearances and goals by club, season and competition
Club	Season	League		Cup		League Cup		Continental		Total	
Club	Season	Apps	Goals	Apps	Goals	Apps	Goals	Apps	Goals	Apps	Goals
Boulder Rapids Reserve	2005	9	10	–	–	–	–	–	–	9	2
Boulder Rapids Reserve	2006	8	5	–	–	–	–	–	–	8	5
Boulder Rapids Reserve	Total	17	15	–	–	–	–	–	–	17	15
Los Angeles Galaxy	2007	9	2	–	–	0	0	–	–	9	2
Los Angeles Galaxy	Total	9	2	–	–	0	0	–	–	9	2
Real Salt Lake	2007	16	6	–	–	0	0	–	–	16	6
Real Salt Lake	2008	29	6	–	–	3	0	–	–	32	6
Real Salt Lake	2009	27	12	–	–	4	3	–	–	31	15
Real Salt Lake	2010	24	5	–	–	2	1	6	0	32	6
Real Salt Lake	Total	96	29	–	–	9	4	6	0	111	33
Nottingham Forest	2010–11	2	0	0	0	0	0	0	0	2	0
Nottingham Forest	2011–12	23	3	1	0	3	3	0	0	27	6
Nottingham Forest	2012–13	0	0	0	0	0	0	0	0	0	0
Nottingham Forest	Total	25	3	1	0	3	3	0	0	29	6
Gillingham (loan)	2012–13	7	0	0	0	0	0	0	0	7	0
Gillingham (loan)	Total	7	0	0	0	0	0	0	0	7	0
Real Salt Lake	2013	25	6	4	0	5	2	–	–	34	8
Real Salt Lake	2014	16	1	1	1	1	0	–	–	18	2
Real Salt Lake	Total	41	7	5	1	6	2	–	–	52	10
Toronto FC	2015	25	2	–	–	1	0	–	–	26	2
Toronto FC	Total	25	2	–	–	1	0	–	–	26	2
Rayo OKC	2016	20	4	1	0	1	0	–	–	22	4
Rayo OKC	Total	20	4	–	–	1	0	–	–	22	4
Career total		240	62	7	1	20	9	6	0	273	72
