= Alen Marcina =

Canadian soccer coach and former player (born 1979)

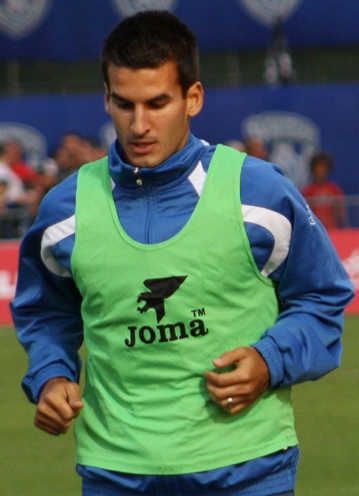

Personal information
- Full name: Alen Ivano Marcina
- Date of birth: July 30, 1979 (age 47)
- Place of birth: Surrey, British Columbia, Canada
- Height: 5 ft 10 in (1.78 m)
- Position: Striker

Senior career*
Years	Team	Apps	(Gls)
2002	New Westminster Khalsa	18	(38)
2002–2003	Ottawa Wizards	10	(9)
2004–2005	PAOK	28	
2004	→ ÍA (loan)		
2005	→ Schweinfurt (loan)		
2005	Herfølge	22	(0)
2006	Puerto Rico Islanders	27	(13)
2006–2007	New Zealand Knights	8	(2)
2007	Puerto Rico Islanders	8	(1)
2007	Montreal Impact	8	(1)
2007	Vancouver Whitecaps	6	(1)
2008	Minnesota Thunder	18	(3)
2008	Rochester Rhinos	3	(0)
2009	Miami FC	29	(5)
Total		185	(73)

Managerial career
- 2012–2013: San Antonio Scorpions (assistant)
- 2013–2015: San Antonio Scorpions
- 2016: Rayo OKC
- 2018: Des Moines Menace
- 2019: San Antonio FC (assistant)
- 2020–2024: San Antonio FC
- * Club domestic league appearances and goals as of October 31, 2017

Alen Marcina (born July 30, 1979) is a Canadian soccer coach and former player. He is a three-time champion with San Antonio Scorpions and Rayo OKC in the NASL.

== Club career ==
Marcina played college soccer with Barry University, and with New Westminster Khalsa in the Pacific Coast Soccer League, before joining the Ottawa Wizards for the 2002–03 CPSL season, where he scored 9 goals in just 10 matches. When the Wizards had their license revoked by the CPSL, Marcina tried his luck in Europe and managed to sign a contract with Greek club and UEFA Cup Participants, PAOK in January 2004. The next years saw him play with ÍA Akranes of Iceland, Schweinfurt of Germany and Herfølge Boldklub of Denmark.

Marcina signed with the Puerto Rico Islanders for the 2006 season of the second-tier league of American soccer, the USL First Division, which is a level below Major League Soccer. He scored 13 goals in 27 appearances for the Islanders earning All-League selection before moving to the New Zealand Knights in November 2006. He netted his first goal for the Knights against the Newcastle Jets and also scored in the 3–1 win over the Queensland Roar.

Marcina returned to the USL and Puerto Rico in 2007, making another handful of appearances, before being bought by Canadian club Montreal Impact in June 2007. He was traded in July 2007 to the Vancouver Whitecaps. He signed with the Minnesota Thunder on February 12, 2008. On August 27, 2008, the Thunder sold Marcina's contract to the Rochester Rhinos. In April 2009 left Rochester Rhinos and signed with Miami FC where he led the team in goals, games played and minutes played. Marcina announced his retirement in 2010 after turning down multiple offers in the US and Vietnam.

== International career ==
Marcina called up by the Canada national team missed New Zealand's round 21 match against Perth Glory at North Harbour Stadium.

== Managerial career ==
- 2012 NASL Champion-North American Supporters' Trophy (most goals scored (46) and fewest goals conceded (27)
- 2013 NASL Spring season third place (1 point out of first place)
- 2014 NASL Fall Champion
- 2014 NASL Soccer Bowl Champion. (fewest goals conceded (24) and second-most goals scored (43))
- 2015 NASL Spring seventh place (SA scorpions folded November 2015)
- 2016 NASL Fall season second place (one point out of first place)
- 2016 NASL Top 5 overall standings (resigned August 1, 2016)
- 2022 USL Championship Champion

San Antonio FC parted ways with Marcina on October 31, 2024.

== Personal life ==
Marcina family is of Croatian ancestry, originally hails from Dugi Otok in Croatia.
