= 2022 Cavalry FC season =

Cavalry FC
2022 season
- President: Ian Allison
- Head coach: Tommy Wheeldon Jr.
- Stadium: ATCO Field
- Canadian Premier League: 3rd
- CPL playoffs: Semi-finals
- Canadian Championship: Quarter-finals
- Top goalscorer: League: Joe Mason (8); All: Joe Mason (8)

The 2022 Cavalry FC season was the fourth season in the history of Cavalry FC. In addition to the Canadian Premier League, the club also competed in the Canadian Championship.

== Squad ==
As of September 2, 2022

No.	Player	Nationality	Position(s)	Date of birth (age)	Previous club
Goalkeepers
1	Marco Carducci	(Canada)	GK	September 24, 1996 (aged 26)	(Canada) Calgary Foothills
12	Julian Roloff	(Germany)	GK	January 17, 2001 (aged 21)	(Germany) FC Köln II
Defenders
2	Roberto Alarcón	(Spain)	RB	April 21, 1998 (aged 24)	(Romania) Universitatea Cluj
3	Tom Field	(Republic of Ireland)	LB	March 14, 1997 (aged 25)	(Scotland) Dundee F.C.
4	Daan Klomp	(Netherlands)	CB	August 10, 1998 (aged 24)	(Netherlands) NAC Breda
5	Mason Trafford	(Canada)	CB	August 21, 1986 (aged 36)	(United States) Miami City
7	Fraser Aird	(Canada)	RB / RW / ST	February 2, 1995 (aged 27)	(Canada) FC Edmonton
18	Bradley Vliet	(Netherlands)	LB	March 24, 1998 (aged 24)	(Netherlands) FC Dordrecht
25	Karifa Yao	(Canada)	CB	September 28, 2000 (aged 22)	(Canada) CF Montréal
29	Michael Harms	(Canada)	CB	December 31, 2005 (aged 17)	(Canada) Calgary Foothills
Midfielders
6	Charlie Trafford	(Canada)	DM	May 24, 1992 (aged 30)	(Wales) Wrexham
8	Elijah Adekugbe	(Canada)	MF	July 17, 1996 (aged 26)	(Canada) Calgary Foothills
10	Sergio Camargo	(Canada)	AM	August 16, 1994 (aged 28)	(Canada) Calgary Foothills
11	José Escalante	(Honduras)	LW	May 29, 1995 (aged 27)	(Honduras) Juticalpa
14	Joseph Di Chiara	(Canada)	DM / CM	January 30, 1992 (aged 30)	(Canada) York9 FC
15	Elliot Simmons	(Canada)	CM	February 5, 1998 (aged 24)	(Canada) HFX Wanderers
17	Ben Fisk	(Canada)	RW / LW	February 4, 1993 (aged 29)	(Canada) Atlético Ottawa
21	Jean-Aniel Assi	(Canada)	RW / LW	August 12, 2004 (aged 18)	(Canada) CF Montréal
22	Mikaël Cantave	(Haiti)	AM / CF	October 25, 1996 (aged 26)	(Romania) Chindia Târgoviște
24	David Norman Jr.	(Canada)	MF / LB	May 31, 1998 (aged 24)	(United States) Inter Miami
	Niko Myroniuk	(Canada)	CM	July 21, 2005 (aged 17)	(Canada) Cavalry U-20
Forwards
9	Myer Bevan	(New Zealand)	ST	April 23, 1997 (aged 25)	(New Zealand) Auckland City
13	Ali Musse	(Somalia)	ST / AM	January 1, 1996 (aged 26)	(Germany) 1. FCA Darmstadt
19	Anthony Novak	(Canada)	ST	March 27, 1994 (aged 28)	(Portugal) Clube Condeixa
20	Joe Mason	(Republic of Ireland)	FW	May 13, 1991 (aged 31)	(England) Milton Keynes Dons
	Goteh Ntignee	(Canada)	FW / RW / LW	May 10, 2002 (aged 20)	(Germany) FC Grimma
	Gareth Smith-Doyle	(Canada)	FW		(Canada) Cavalry U-20

== Transfers ==
=== In ===
No.	Pos.	Player	From club	Fee/notes	Date	Source
9	FW	(New Zealand) Myer Bevan	(New Zealand) Auckland City	Free	January 28, 2022	
7	FW	(Canada) Fraser Aird	(Canada) FC Edmonton	Free	February 9, 2022	
6	MF	(Canada) Charlie Trafford	(Wales) Wrexham	Free	February 17, 2022	
12	GK	(Germany) Julian Roloff	(Germany) FC Köln II	Free	March 18, 2022	
27	MF	(Canada) Skyler Rogers	(Germany) Calgary Foothills	Signed to a development contract	April 8, 2022	
23	FW	(Canada) Aribim Pepple		Free	April 28, 2022	
18	DF	(Netherlands) Bradley Vliet	(Netherlands) FC Dordrecht	Free	April 30, 2022	
28	DF	(Canada) Markus Kaiser	(Canada) UBC Thunderbirds	Selected 14th overall in the 2022 CPL–U Sports Draft	May 14, 2022	
2	DF	(Spain) Roberto Alarcón	(Romania) Universitatea Cluj	Free	July 5, 2022	
22	MF	(Haiti) Mikaël Cantave	(Romania) Chindia Târgoviște	Free	July 13, 2022	
29	DF	(Canada) Michael Harms	(Canada) Calgary Foothills	Signed to a development contract	July 27, 2022	
	FW	(Canada) Goteh Ntignee	(Germany) FC Grimma	Free	August 10, 2022	
	FW	(Canada) Gareth Smith-Doyle	(Canada) Cavalry U-20	Free	August 18, 2022	
	MF	(Canada) Niko Myroniuk	(Canada) Cavalry U-20	Signed to a development contract	September 2, 2022	

==== Loans in ====
No.	Pos.	Player	Loaned from	Fee/notes	Date	Source
25	DF	(Canada) Karifa Yao	(Canada) CF Montréal	Season-long loan	March 18, 2022	
21	MF	(Canada) Jean-Aniel Assi	(Canada) CF Montréal	Season-long loan	March 18, 2022	

==== Draft picks ====
Cavalry FC will make the following selections in the 2022 CPL–U Sports Draft. Draft picks are not automatically signed to the team roster. Only those who are signed to a contract will be listed as transfers in.

Round	Selection	Pos.	Player	Nationality	University
1	6	DF	Caden Rogozinski	Canada	Mount Royal
2	14	DF	Markus Kaiser	Canada	UBC

=== Out ===
No.	Pos.	Player	To club	Fee/notes	Date	Source
21	DF	(Canada) Mohamed Farsi	(United States) Columbus Crew 2	Contract expired	November 25, 2021	
18	FW	(Canada) José Hernández	(Canada) Rivers FC	Contract expired	November 25, 2021	
2	DF	(Canada) Nicolas Apostol		Contract expired	November 25, 2021	
19	FW	(United States) Ahinga Selemani	(Malta) Gudja United	Contract expired	January 9, 2022	
23	MF	(Brazil) Richard Luca	(Bolivia) Atlético Palmaflor	Contract expired	January 14, 2021	
7	FW	(Brazil) Oliver Minatel	(Canada) York United	Contract expired	January 25, 2022	
6	MF	(Canada) Nik Ledgerwood	N/A	Retired	January 31, 2022	
16	MF	(Canada) Victor Loturi	(Scotland) Ross County	Undisclosed fee	June 21, 2022	
23	FW	(Canada) Aribim Pepple	(England) Luton Town	Undisclosed fee & sell-on clause	August 2, 2022	
22	GK	(Canada) Tyson Farago	N/A	Retired	August 9, 2022	

== Pre-season and friendlies ==
Cavalry FC made a pre-season trip to Mexico where the club spent ten days training at the IA Sports Facility south of Monterrey and played in friendlies against Correcaminos, the Tigres B team, and a team from the Mexican third division, recording one win, one draw, and one loss.

== Competitions ==
Matches are listed in Calgary local time: Mountain Daylight Time (UTC−6) until November 5, and Mountain Standard Time (UTC−7) otherwise.

=== Overview ===
Competition	First match	Last match	Starting round	Final position	Record							
Competition	First match	Last match	Starting round	Final position	Pld	W	D	L	GF	GA	GD	Win %
Canadian Premier League	April 9	October 8	Matchday 1		19	9	4	6	30	23	+7	47.37
Canadian Championship	May 10	May 25	Preliminary round	Quarter-finals	2	1	1	0	3	2	+1	50.00
Total					21	10	5	6	33	25	+8	47.62

Last updated: August 3, 2022
Source: Competitions

=== Canadian Premier League ===
==== Table ====
Pos	Team	Pld	W	D	L	GF	GA	GD	Pts	Qualification
1	Atlético Ottawa (S)	28	13	10	5	36	29	+7	49	Advance to playoffs
2	Forge (C)	28	14	5	9	47	25	+22	47	Advance to playoffs
3	Cavalry	28	14	5	9	39	33	+6	47	Advance to playoffs
4	Pacific	28	13	7	8	36	33	+3	46	Advance to playoffs
5	Valour	28	10	7	11	36	34	+2	37	
6	York United	28	9	7	12	31	37	−6	34	
7	HFX Wanderers	28	8	5	15	24	38	−14	29	
8	FC Edmonton	28	4	8	16	31	51	−20	20	

Source: CanPL.ca
Rules for classification: 1) points; 2) total wins; 3) goal differential; 4) goals for; 5) away goals differential; 6) away goals for; 7) home goals differential; 8) home goals for; 9) U-21 minutes; 10) coin toss or drawing of lots.
(C) Champion; (S) Regular season winner

==== Results by match ====
Match	1	2	3	4	5	6	7	8	9	10	11	12	13	14	15	16	17	18	19	20	21	22	23	24	25	26	27	28
Result	L	D	L	W	W	D	W	W	W	W	W	D	D	W	L	L	L	W	L	W	L	W	D	L	W	L	W	W
Position	8	7	8	7	3	3	2	2	2	1	1	1	1	1	1	2	4	3	3	2	4	2						

Updated to match(es) played on March 25, 2023. Source: #Matches
W = Win; D = Draw; L = Loss

==== Matches ====
April 9 1	Atlético Ottawa	1–0	Cavalry FC	Ottawa, Ontario
1:00pm	Espejo (yellow card) 16'; Wright 81' (pen.); Beckie (red card) 85'	Report	Camargo (yellow card) 19'; Fisk (yellow card) 32'; Klomp (yellow card) 36'; Escalante (yellow card) 81'	Stadium: TD Place Stadium; Attendance: 4,172; Referee: Fabrizio Stasolla

April 16 2	Forge FC	2–2	Cavalry FC	Hamilton, Ontario
2:00pm	Hojabrpour 3'; Metusala (yellow card) 72'; Choinière 90'	Report	Klomp (yellow card) 5'; Mason 31'; Yao (yellow card) 32'; Musse 39'; Loturi (yellow card) 43'; Escalante (yellow card) 80'	Stadium: Tim Hortons Field; Attendance: 3,688; Referee: Filip Dujic

April 22 3	York United FC	2–0	Cavalry FC	Toronto, Ontario
5:30pm	Minatel 35'; Wilson (yellow card) 61'; De Rosario 73' (yellow card) 89'; N'sa (yellow card) 90+2'	Report	Klomp (yellow card) 32'; M. Trafford (yellow card) 38'; C. Trafford (yellow card) 72'; Yao (yellow card) 76'; Escalante (yellow card) 89'	Stadium: York Lions Stadium; Attendance: 1,004; Referee: Carly Shaw-MacLaren

May 1 4	Cavalry FC	2–0	Pacific FC	Foothills County, Alberta
3:30pm	Musse 2'; Aird (yellow card) 24'; Mason 37', (yellow card) 45+3'; Norman Jr. (yellow card) 60'	Report	Mavila (yellow card) 52'; Young (yellow card) 86'	Stadium: ATCO Field; Attendance: 4,206; Referee: Alain Ruch

May 6 5 Wildrose Cup	FC Edmonton	0–3	Cavalry FC	Edmonton, Alberta
8:00pm	Timoteo (yellow card) 83'	Report	Vliet (yellow card) 4'; Mason 30'; Musse 34'; Carducci (yellow card) 65'; Simmons (yellow card) 69'; Yao (yellow card) 69'; Loturi (yellow card) 76'; Loughrey 88' (o.g.)	Stadium: Clarke Stadium; Attendance: 1,044; Referee: David Barrie

May 15 6	HFX Wanderers FC	2–2	Cavalry FC	Halifax, Nova Scotia
12:00pm	Garcia 37'; Santos (yellow card) 49'; Salter 61'; Fernandez (yellow card) 76'; Oxner (yellow card) 90+2'; Gander (yellow card) 90+4'	Report	Loturi (yellow card) 2'; Bevan 20'; Simmons (yellow card) 80'; C. Trafford (yellow card) 87'; Klomp 90+4'	Stadium: Wanderers Grounds; Attendance: 5,244; Referee: Marie-Soleil Beaudoin

May 21 7	Cavalry FC	2–1	Valour FC	Foothills County, Alberta
1:30pm	Vliet (yellow card) 45'; Bevan 85'; Adekugbe 90+2'	Report	Fordyce (yellow card) 69'; Romeo (yellow card) 84'; Baquero (yellow card) 87'; Ponce (yellow card) 87'; Cebara 89'	Stadium: ATCO Field; Attendance: 2,945; Referee: Yusri Rudolf

May 29 8	York United FC	0–1	Cavalry FC	Toronto, Ontario
12:00pm	Toussaint (yellow card) 7'; Johnston (yellow card) 45+3'; N'sa (yellow card) 61' (yellow-red card) 83'; Abzi (yellow card) 79'; Cabrera (yellow card) 83'	Report	Musse (yellow card) 37'; Adekugbe (yellow card) 63'; Pepple 73'; M. Trafford (yellow card) 89'; Klomp (yellow card) 90+1'	Stadium: York Lions Stadium; Attendance: 1,267; Referee: Ben Hoskins

June 11 9	Cavalry FC	1–0	HFX Wanderers FC	Foothills County, Alberta
1:30pm	Pepple 47'; C. Trafford (yellow card) 54'; Yao (yellow card) 69'; M. Trafford (yellow card) 70'; Camargo (yellow card) 90+2'	Report	Rampersad (yellow card) 65'; Restrepo (yellow card) 85'	Stadium: ATCO Field; Attendance: 3,045; Referee: Juan Marquez

June 15 10	Valour FC	2–4	Cavalry FC	Winnipeg, Manitoba
6:00pm	Carlos (yellow card) 38'; Cebara (yellow card) 51'; Ponce 56'; Peña (yellow card) 79'; de Brienne 90+3'	Report	Cebara 4' (o.g.); Camargo 15', (yellow card) 45'; M. Trafford 60'; Pepple 64'	Stadium: IG Field; Attendance: 2,395; Referee: Alain Ruch

June 26 11 Wildrose Cup	Cavalry FC	3–1	FC Edmonton	Foothills County, Alberta
5:00pm	M. Trafford (yellow card) 10'; Pepple 26', 48' (pen.), (yellow card) 58'; Higgins 29' (o.g.); Adekugbe (yellow card) 51'	Report	Triantafillou (yellow card) 11'; Bitar 45'; Gonzalez (yellow card) 53'; Singh (yellow card) 67'	Stadium: ATCO Field; Attendance: 4,743; Referee: David Barrie

June 30 12	Pacific FC	3–3	Cavalry FC	Langford, British Columbia
7:30pm	Daniels 6'; Aparicio (red card) 29'; dos Santos 43'; Dada-Luke (yellow card) 49'; Díaz 74'	Report	Norman Jr. (red card) 29'; Klomp 45+4'; Escalante 50', (yellow card) 53'; Pepple 56'	Stadium: Starlight Stadium; Attendance: 3,017; Referee: Yusri Rudolf

July 9 13	Atlético Ottawa	1–1	Cavalry FC	Ottawa, Ontario
5:00pm	Tabla 47'; Acosta (yellow card) 75'	Report	Escalante 20'; M. Trafford (yellow card) 84'	Stadium: TD Place Stadium; Attendance: 3,900; Referee: Renzo Villanueva

July 14 14	Cavalry FC	3–0	HFX Wanderers FC	Foothills County, Alberta
6:30pm	Alarcón (yellow card) 25'; Di Chiara (yellow card) 27'; Musse 52', 56'; Camargo 60'	Report	Gagnon-Laparé (red card) 27'	Stadium: ATCO Field; Attendance: 3,006; Referee: Carly Shaw-MacLaren

July 19 15	Cavalry FC	0–1	York United FC	Foothills County, Alberta
7:30pm	Di Chiara (yellow card) 50'	Report	De Rosario 29'; Wilson (yellow card) 30' (yellow-red card) 51'; Giantsopoulos (yellow card) 75'; Johnston (yellow card) 90+5'	Stadium: ATCO Field; Referee: Scott Bowman

July 22 16	Pacific FC	3–0	Cavalry FC	Langford, British Columbia
8:00pm	Bustos 24', (yellow card) 25'; Aparicio (yellow card) 32'; Escalante 50' (o.g.); Díaz 68'	Report	Norman Jr. (yellow card) 15'; Klomp (yellow card) 26'; Trafford (yellow card) 32'; Escalante (yellow card) 43'	Stadium: Starlight Stadium; Attendance: 3,238; Referee: Alain Ruch

July 27 17	Cavalry FC	1–2	Forge FC	Foothills County, Alberta
7:00pm	Mason 1'; Musse (yellow card) 12'; Di Chiara (yellow card) 54'; C. Trafford (yellow card) 70'; Alarcón (yellow card) 79'	Report	Pacius 37'; Bekker 49'; Borges (yellow card) 53'; Henry (yellow card) 67'	Stadium: ATCO Field; Attendance: 2,989; Referee: Yusri Rudolf

July 30 18 Wildrose Cup	Cavalry FC	2–0	FC Edmonton	Foothills County, Alberta
4:00pm	Mason 28'; Yao 43'; Alarcón (yellow card) 52'; Klomp (yellow card) 84'; Norman Jr. (yellow card) 90+6'	Report	Smith (yellow card) 38'; Gonzalez (yellow card) 79'	Stadium: ATCO Field; Attendance: 3,446; Referee: Filip Dujic

August 3 19	Valour FC	2–0	Cavalry FC	Winnipeg, Manitoba
6:00pm	Dyer 7', 72'; Mekidèche (yellow card) 20'; Baquero (yellow card) 67'	Report	Simmons (yellow card) 90'	Stadium: IG Field; Attendance: 3,200; Referee: Ben Hoskins

August 12 20	Cavalry FC	2–1	Forge FC	Foothills County, Alberta
7:00pm	Mason 7', (yellow card) 48'; Trafford (yellow card) 43'; Klomp (yellow card) 75'; Cantave 90', (yellow card) 90+1'		Henry (yellow card) 41'; Rama (yellow card) 49'; Hamilton 82'	Stadium: ATCO Field; Attendance: 3,945; Referee: Alain Ruch

August 21 21	Cavalry FC	0–3	Atlético Ottawa	Calgary, Alberta
3:30pm	Trafford (yellow card) 9'; Escalante (yellow card) 66'		Alemán 45+2'; Beckie (yellow card) 64'; Alemán (yellow card) 75'; Wright 79'; Bassett 89'	Stadium: ATCO Field; Attendance: 3,723

August 27 22	Cavalry FC	1-0	York United FC	Foothills County, Alberta
1:30pm	Cantave (yellow card) 33'; Norman Jr. (yellow card) 37'; Escalante 55'; Simmons (yellow card) 59'; Assi (yellow card) 87'		Lawrie-Lattanzio (yellow card) 63'	Stadium: ATCO Field; Attendance: 3,401; Referee: Renzo Villanueva

September 5 23	HFX Wanderers FC	0-0	Cavalry FC	Halifax, Nova Scotia
12:00pm	Escobar (yellow card) 51'; Lamothe (yellow card) 74'		Cantave (yellow card) 33'; Trafford (yellow card) 76'; Di Chiara (yellow card) 83'	Stadium: Wanderers Grounds; Attendance: 6,088; Referee: Filip Dujic

September 10 24	Forge FC	2-1	Cavalry FC	Hamilton, Ontario
3:00pm	Choinière 10'; Rama (yellow card) 38'; Sissoko 52'; Pacius (yellow card) 69'; Bekker (red card) 70'; Borges (yellow card) 72'		Escalante (yellow card) 45'; Musse 63'; Di Chiara (red card) 86'; Cantave (yellow card) 72' (yellow-red card) 90+5'	Stadium: Tim Hortons Field; Attendance: 4,992; Referee: Mathieu Souaré

September 17 25 Wildrose Cup	FC Edmonton	0-1	Cavalry FC	Edmonton, Alberta
2:00pm	Smith (yellow card) 61'; Warschewski (yellow card) 69'; Singh (yellow card) 70'		Mason 57'	Stadium: Clarke Stadium; Attendance: 1,505; Referee: Marie-Soleil Beaudoin

September 24 26	Cavalry FC	1-3	Atlético Ottawa	Foothills County, Alberta
3:30pm	Escalante 79' (pen.); Trafford (yellow card) 34'; Alarcón (yellow card) 75'		Tabla 4' (yellow card) 79'; Sissoko (yellow card) 17'; Espejo (yellow card) 30'; Wright 54'; Shaw 86'	Stadium: ATCO Field; Attendance: 4,424; Referee: Filip Dujic

October 2 27	Cavalry FC	2-1	Valour FC	Foothills County, Alberta
1:30pm	Mason 39'; Musse 81'		Mekideche (yellow card) 22'; Forbes 48'; de Brienne (yellow card) 74'; Cebara (yellow card) 77'	Stadium: ATCO Field; Attendance: 2,662; Referee: Alain Ruch

October 8 28	Cavalry FC	1-0	Pacific FC	Foothills County, Alberta
4:00pm	Alarcón (yellow card) 40'; Musse (yellow card) 70'; M. Trafford (yellow card) 75'; Fisk 89'; Smith-Doyle (yellow card) 90+2'		Haynes (yellow card) 61'; Mukumbilwa (yellow card) 66'; Toussaint (yellow card) 75'	Stadium: ATCO Field; Attendance: 3,401; Referee: Yusri Rudolf

==== Playoff matches ====
October 15 SF leg 1	Cavalry FC	1–1	Forge FC	Foothills County, Alberta
2:00 pm	Klomp 42'; Musse (yellow card) 53'; Alarcón (yellow card) 63'; M. Trafford (yellow card) 90'	Report	Owolabi-Belewu (yellow card) 39'; Hojabrpour (yellow card) 45+2'; Pacius 47'; Bekker (yellow card) 90'	Stadium: ATCO Field; Attendance: 3,179; Referee: Alain Ruch

October 23 SF leg 2	Forge FC	2–1 (3–2 agg.)	Cavalry FC	Hamilton, Ontario
3:00 pm	Bekker (red card) 43'; Choinière 69'; Pacius 75' (pen.); Rama (yellow card) 79'	Report	Norman (yellow card) 25' (yellow-red card) 45+3'; Bevan 78', (yellow card) 81'	Stadium: Tim Hortons Field; Attendance: 7,133; Referee: Yusri Rudolf

=== Canadian Championship ===
May 10 Preliminary round	Cavalry FC	2–1	FC Edmonton	Foothills County, Alberta
7:30pm	Bevan 17', 36' (pen.); Klomp (yellow card) 46'; C. Trafford (yellow card) 90+4'	Report	Higgins (yellow card) 11'; Simmons (yellow card) 45'; Loughrey (yellow card) 47'; Warschewski 55' (pen.)	Stadium: ATCO Field; Referee: Juan Marquez

May 25 Quarter-finals	Cavalry FC	1–1 (3–5 p)	Vancouver Whitecaps FC	Foothills County, Alberta
7:00pm	C. Trafford (yellow card) 47'; Bevan 72'	Report	Baldisimo (yellow card) 40'; Brown (yellow card) 63'; Berhalter (yellow card) 70'; Klomp 85' (o.g.); Veselinović (yellow card) 90+6'	Stadium: ATCO Field; Referee: Yusri Rudolf
	Penalties
	Bevan (penalty scored); Escalante (penalty scored); Simmons (penalty scored); Musse (penalty missed)		(penalty scored) Cavallini; (penalty scored) Caicedo; (penalty scored) Dájome; (penalty scored) Owusu; (penalty scored) Gutiérrez

== Statistics ==
=== Squad and statistics ===
As of October 23, 2022

No.	Pos	Nat	Player	Total		Canadian Premier League		Canadian Championship	
No.	Pos	Nat	Player	Apps	Goals	Apps	Goals	Apps	Goals
1	GK	(Canada) CAN	Marco Carducci	28	0	26	0	2	0
4	DF	(Netherlands) NED	Daan Klomp	29	3	24+3	3	2+0	0
5	DF	(Canada) CAN	Mason Trafford	25	1	21+2	1	2+0	0
6	MF	(Canada) CAN	Charlie Trafford	26	0	20+4	0	1+1	0
7	MF	(Canada) CAN	Fraser Aird	5	0	5+0	0	0+0	0
8	MF	(England) ENG	Elijah Adekugbe	22	1	10+12	1	0+0	0
9	FW	(New Zealand) NZL	Myer Bevan	14	6	5+7	3	2+0	3
10	MF	(Canada) CAN	Sergio Camargo	15	2	9+6	2	0+0	0
11	MF	(Honduras) HON	José Escalante	28	4	25+3	4	0+0	0
12	GK	(Germany) GER	Julian Roloff	4	0	4+0	0	0+0	0
13	FW	(Somalia) SOM	Ali Musse	29	7	24+5	7	0+0	0
14	MF	(Canada) CAN	Joseph Di Chiara	18	0	9+9	0	0+0	0
15	MF	(Canada) CAN	Elliot Simmons	26	0	20+6	0	0+0	0
16	MF	(Canada) CAN	Victor Loturi	10	0	9+1	0	0+0	0
17	MF	(Canada) CAN	Ben Fisk	27	1	14+13	1	0+0	0
20	FW	(Republic of Ireland) IRL	Joe Mason	22	8	21+1	8	0+0	0
21	FW	(Canada) CAN	Jean-Aniel Assi	4	0	2+2	0	0+0	0
24	MF	(Canada) CAN	David Norman Jr.	21	0	11+10	0	0+0	0
25	DF	(Canada) CAN	Karifa Yao	26	1	26+0	1	0+0	0

=== Top scorers ===
Rank	Nat.	Player	Pos.	Canadian Premier League	Canadian Championship	TOTAL
1	(Republic of Ireland)	Joe Mason	FW	2	0	2
1	(Somalia)	Ali Musse	FW	2	0	2
Totals				4	0	4

=== Disciplinary record ===
No.	Pos.	Nat.	Player	Canadian Premier League		Canadian Championship		TOTAL	
No.	Pos.	Nat.	Player	Yellow card	Red card	Yellow card	Red card	Yellow card	Red card
4	DF	(Netherlands)	Daan Klomp	3	0	0	0	3	0
5	DF	(Canada)	Mason Trafford	1	0	0	0	1	0
6	MF	(Canada)	Charlie Trafford	1	0	0	0	1	0
7	MF	(Canada)	Fraser Aird	1	0	0	0	1	0
10	MF	(Canada)	Sergio Camargo	1	0	0	0	1	0
11	MF	(Honduras)	José Escalante	3	0	0	0	3	0
16	MF	(Canada)	Victor Loturi	1	0	0	0	1	0
17	MF	(Canada)	Ben Fisk	1	0	0	0	1	0
20	FW	(Republic of Ireland)	Joe Mason	1	0	0	0	1	0
24	MF	(Canada)	David Norman Jr.	1	0	0	0	1	0
25	DF	(Canada)	Karifa Yao	2	0	0	0	2	0
Totals				16	0	0	0	16	0
