= 2014 Ottawa Fury FC season =

Ottawa Fury
2014 season
- President: John Pugh
- Head Coach: Marc Dos Santos
- Stadium: Keith Harris Stadium; TD Place Stadium
- NASL: Spring: 6th Fall: 9th Combined: 8th
- Soccer Bowl: Did not qualify
- Canadian Championship: Preliminary Round
- Top goalscorer: League: Oliver Minatel (7); All: Oliver Minatel (7)
- Highest home attendance: 14,593 (20 July v. New York; New NASL record)
- Lowest home attendance: 2,158 (26 April v. Carolina)
- Average home league attendance: League: 4,492; All: 4,353
Home colours	Away colours

The 2014 Ottawa Fury FC season was the club's first season in the North American Soccer League.

== Background ==
Marc Dos Santos became the first head coach of the club on July 1, 2013.

== Squad ==
As of match played 1 November 2014

No.	Name	Nationality	Position	Date of birth (age)	Signed from	Signed in	Apps.	Goals
Goalkeepers
1	Romuald Peiser	(France)	GK	3 August 1979 (aged 35)	(Portugal) Académica	2014	15	0
12	Chad Bush	(Canada)	GK	30 May 1994 (aged 20)	Ottawa Fury (PDL)	2014	0	0
24	Marcel DeBellis	(Canada)	GK	17 April 1991 (aged 23)	(Italy) Ascoli	2014	0	0
29	Devala Gorrick	(United States)	GK	8 July 1987 (aged 27)	(Sweden) Frej	2014	14	0
Defenders
2	Ramón Soria	(Spain)	LB	7 March 1989 (aged 25)	(Spain) Teruel	2014	20	0
3	Mason Trafford	(Canada)	DF	21 August 1986 (aged 28)	(China) Guizhou Zhicheng	2014	29	0
4	Drew Beckie	(Canada)	DF	30 September 1990 (aged 24)	(United States) Columbus Crew	2014	21	0
5	Omar Jarun	(Palestine)	CB	10 December 1983 (aged 30)	(Belgium) Sporting Charleroi	2014	17	2
19	O'Brian Woodbine	(Jamaica)	DF	30 September 1990 (aged 24)	(United States) New England Revolution	2014	5	0
22	Ryan Richter	(United States)	DF	12 April 1989 (aged 25)	Toronto	2014	15	0
Midfielders
6	Richie Ryan (c)	(Republic of Ireland)	CM	6 January 1985 (aged 29)	(Republic of Ireland) Shamrock Rovers	2014	25	1
8	Nicki Paterson (vc)	(Scotland)	CM	19 January 1985 (aged 29)	(United States) Charleston Battery	2014	17	2
10	Siniša Ubiparipović	(Bosnia and Herzegovina)	CM	25 August 1983 (aged 31)	Montreal Impact	2014	25	4
14	Tony Donatelli	(United States)	CM	7 June 1984 (aged 30)	(United States) VSI Tampa Bay	2014	28	4
15	Philippe Davies	(Canada)	MF	12 December 1990 (aged 23)	(United States) Richmond Kickers	2014	25	1
16	Kenny Caceros	(Canada)	CM/DF	6 April 1988 (aged 26)	(United States) Harrisburg City Islanders	2014	2	0
20	Mauro Eustaquio	(Canada)	CM	18 February 1993 (aged 21)	(Portugal) Sporting Pombal	2014	8	0
Forwards
9	Tom Heinemann	(United States)	CF	23 March 1987 (aged 27)	Vancouver Whitecaps	2014	18	6
11	Oliver Minatel	(Brazil)	FW	29 August 1992 (aged 22)	(Brazil) Velo Clube	2014	24	7
17	Carl Haworth	(Canada)	FW	9 July 1989 (aged 25)	Ottawa Fury (PDL)	2014	26	2
21	Pierre-Rudolph Mayard	(Canada)	W	21 February 1988 (aged 26)	(United States) Rochester Rhinos	2014	20	1
28	Vini Dantas	(Brazil)	CF	14 September 1989 (aged 25)	(Finland) Lahti	2014	28	3

== Friendlies ==
=== Pre-season ===
15 March 2014	Ottawa Fury	2 - 1	York University	Gatineau, Québec
21:00 EST UTC−5	Paterson (pen.); Oliver	Report	Goal	Stadium: Branchaud-Brière Complex

21 March 2014	Rochester Rhinos	1 - 1	Ottawa Fury	Rochester, New York
14:30 EST UTC−5	Vu	Report	Oliver (pen.)	Stadium: Sahlen's Stadium

29 March 2014	Ottawa Fury	2 - 2	Syracuse University	Gatineau, Québec
21:00 EST UTC−5		Report		Stadium: Branchaud-Brière Complex

2 April 2014	Saint-Marc	0 - 4	Ottawa Fury	Sunrise, Florida
17:30 EST UTC−5		Report		Stadium: KICS Sports Complex

5 April 2014	Floridians	1 - 2	Ottawa Fury	Sunrise, Florida
17:30 EST UTC−5		Report		Stadium: KICS Sports Complex

=== Mid-season ===
23 July 2014	Ottawa Fury	0 - 1	Rangers	Ottawa, Ontario
20:30 EST UTC−5	Donatelli (yellow card) 24'; Davies (yellow card) 62'; Caceros (yellow card) 90+3'	Report	Law 38'	Stadium: TD Place Stadium; Attendance: 8,643; Referee: Mathieu Bordeau

== Competitions ==
=== NASL Spring season ===
==== Spring season review ====
The Spring season saw Fury FC give a sturdy account of themselves on their NASL debut, as the club went 3-1-5 while never losing a match by more than two goals. Vini Dantas scored the first goal in club history on April 19, 2014, in a 2-1 defeat against Minnesota United. The first victory in club history came the following weekend, as Ottawa blew out the visiting Carolina RailHawks 4-0 on April 26. Fury FC also picked up victories against expansion brethren Indy Eleven (4-2) and established Canadian rivals FC Edmonton (1-0), while picking up a draw at home against Tampa Bay Rowdies. While Fury FC lost a pair of matches on home turf at the final minute, the club still sat in a respectable sixth place out of ten at the culmination of the Spring season, just four points behind the final playoff spot.

==== Standings ====
Pos	Team	Pld	W	D	L	GF	GA	GD	Pts	Qualification
1	Minnesota United (S)	9	6	2	1	16	9	+7	20	Playoffs
2	New York Cosmos	9	6	1	2	14	3	+11	19	
3	San Antonio Scorpions	9	5	2	2	13	9	+4	17	
4	Carolina RailHawks	9	4	2	3	11	15	−4	14	
5	Fort Lauderdale Strikers	9	4	1	4	18	18	0	13	
6	Ottawa Fury	9	3	1	5	14	13	+1	10	
7	Tampa Bay Rowdies	9	2	4	3	11	16	−5	10	
8	Atlanta Silverbacks	9	3	1	5	12	20	−8	10	
9	FC Edmonton	9	2	2	5	11	11	0	8	
10	Indy Eleven	9	0	4	5	14	20	−6	4	

Source: NASL Standings
(S) Spring season champion

==== Results summary ====
Overall								Home						Away					
Pld	W	D	L	GF	GA	GD	Pts	W	D	L	GF	GA	GD	W	D	L	GF	GA	GD
9	3	1	5	14	13	+1	10	2	1	2	9	6	+3	1	0	3	5	7	−2

Last updated: August 22, 2015.
Source: Match reports

==== Results by round ====
Round	1	2	3	4	5	6	7	8	9
Ground	A	H	H	A	H	A	H	H	A
Result	L	L	W	L	D	W	L	W	L
Position	9	9	6	8	8	6	8	6	6

Source: Match reports
A = Away; H = Home; W = Win; D = Draw; L = Loss

==== Match reports ====
12 April 2014 1	Fort Lauderdale Strikers	2 - 0	Ottawa Fury FC	Fort Lauderdale, Florida
18:30 EST UTC−5	Alves 13'; Nurse (yellow card) 15'; Nuñez (yellow card) 32'; King 80'	Report	Paterson (yellow card) 70'; Beckie (yellow card) 81'	Stadium: Lockhart Stadium; Attendance: 3,105; Referee: T. Unkel

19 April 2014 2	Ottawa Fury FC	1 - 2	Minnesota United FC	Ottawa, Ontario
14:00 EST UTC−5	Dantas 50'; Davies (yellow card) 85'; Elias (yellow card) 90'	Report	Pitchkolan (yellow card) 21'; Ibarra 36'; Dias (yellow card) 72'; Ramirez 90'	Stadium: Keith Harris Stadium; Attendance: 3,457; Referee: D. Barrie

26 April 2014 3	Ottawa Fury FC	4 - 0	Carolina RailHawks	Ottawa, Ontario
14:00 EST UTC−5	Oliver 34', 72'; Davies (yellow card) 51', (goal) 56'; Schilawski 63' (o.g.)	Report	Low (yellow card) 41'; Ståhl (yellow card) 71'	Stadium: Keith Harris Stadium; Attendance: 2,158; Referee: Y. Rudolf

3 May 2014 4	Atlanta Silverbacks	2 - 1	Ottawa Fury FC	Atlanta, Georgia
18:30 EST UTC−5	McCaulay 44'; Chavez 50'; Ati (yellow card) 82'; Sousa (yellow card) 89'	Report	Elias (yellow card) 22'; Jarun 90'	Stadium: Atlanta Silverbacks Park; Attendance: 3,922; Referee: C. Penso

10 May 2014 5	Ottawa Fury FC	1 - 1	Tampa Bay Rowdies	Ottawa, Ontario
18:00 EST UTC−5	Beckie (yellow card) 26'; Jarun (yellow card) 26'; Donatelli 37'	Report	Hristov 27' (pen.)	Stadium: Keith Harris Stadium; Attendance: 2,164; Referee: J. Tasev

17 May 2014 6	Indy Eleven	2 - 4	Ottawa Fury FC	Indianapolis, Indiana
18:30 EST UTC−5	Ambersley 20' (pen.); Norales (yellow card) 25'; Spencer 44', (yellow card) 45'; Ring (yellow card) 90'	Report	Donatelli 16', 42'; Jarun 40'; Oliver 68'	Stadium: Michael A. Carroll Stadium; Attendance: 10,285; Referee: M. Kadlecik

24 May 2014 7	Ottawa Fury FC	2 - 3	San Antonio Scorpions	Ottawa, Ontario
18:00 EST UTC−5	Trafford (yellow card) 24'; Donatelli 71' (pen.); Ubiparipović 80'; Beckie (yellow card) 85'	Report	Cann (yellow card) 52'; Janicki 57'; James (yellow card) 70'; Menjivar (yellow card) 80'; Hassli 83' (pen.); Garcia 90'	Stadium: Keith Harris Stadium; Attendance: 2,432; Referee: C. Grabas

31 May 2014 8	Ottawa Fury FC	1 - 0	FC Edmonton	Ottawa, Ontario
18:00 EST UTC−5	Oliver (yellow card) 59'; Maykon (yellow card) 80'; Heinemann 90'	Report	Edward (yellow card) 63'; James (yellow card) 77'; Moses (yellow card) 79'	Stadium: Keith Harris Stadium; Attendance: 3,207; Referee: A. Vaughan

8 June 2014 9	New York Cosmos	1 - 0	Ottawa Fury FC	Hempstead, New York
14:00 EST UTC−5	Noselli 6'; Freeman (yellow card) 76'; Ayoze (yellow card) 87'	Report	Beckie (yellow card) 41'; Dantas (yellow card) 68'; Oliver (yellow card) 69'; Elias (yellow card) 76'	Stadium: James M. Shuart Stadium; Attendance: 6,495; Referee: M. Bourdeau

=== NASL Fall season ===
==== Fall season review ====
The Fall season saw plenty of ups and downs for Fury FC. French goalkeeper Romuald Peiser joined the club in early July, and turned in multiple Man-of-the-Match performances during the Fall campaign. Opening day of the Fall season saw Ottawa draw 0-0 in Edmonton against their Canadian rivals on a sweltering day, and the ruing of missed opportunities was a foreshadowing of things to come. Fury FC christened their new home, TD Place Stadium, the following weekend, and despite setting a modern-day NASL record in attendance, Ottawa fell 1-0 to the defending Soccer Bowl champion New York Cosmos on a Sebastián Guenzatti goal. Ottawa stumbled out of the gate, opening the second portion of the NASL schedule with a six-game winless skid which saw them tumble out of the playoff picture. The team's second trip to Indianapolis, where they'd won already in the spring, was just what the doctor ordered, as Fury FC picked up their first win of the fall campaign on August 23, edging the Eleven 2-1. That victory over Indy would kickstart a good run of form for Dos Santos' side, as Ottawa went on a 4-2-2 run which saw them somewhat claw their way back into the playoff picture. Unfortunately for Fury FC the workhorses in the side gave out in the final weeks of the campaign, and the club ended the season on a disappointing 0-1-3 slide which saw them slide to a disappointing ninth-place finish in the fall table. The fall season saw certain players emerge as cornerstones for the inaugural iteration of the squad; young Mauro Eustaquio emerged from the reserves to make a few starts towards the end of the season, while captain Richie Ryan solidified his role in the heart of the Fury FC midfield. Oliver Minatel battled back from multiple injuries to become a creative force on the flank of what was, in certain matches, a very potent Fury FC attack, while Romuald Peiser proved to be one of the best signings of the club's debut season, providing veteran leadership and timely stops in goal.

==== Standings ====
Pos	Team	Pld	W	D	L	GF	GA	GD	Pts	Qualification
1	San Antonio Scorpions (F)	18	11	2	5	30	15	+15	35	Playoffs
2	Minnesota United	18	10	5	3	31	19	+12	35	
3	FC Edmonton	18	8	5	5	23	18	+5	29	
4	Fort Lauderdale Strikers	18	7	6	5	20	21	−1	27	
5	Carolina RailHawks	18	7	3	8	27	28	−1	24	
6	New York Cosmos	18	5	8	5	23	24	−1	23	
7	Indy Eleven	18	6	5	7	21	26	−5	23	
8	Tampa Bay Rowdies	18	5	5	8	25	34	−9	20	
9	Ottawa Fury	18	4	5	9	20	25	−5	17	
10	Atlanta Silverbacks	18	3	4	11	20	30	−10	13	

Source: NASL Standings
(F) Fall season champion

==== Results summary ====
Overall								Home						Away					
Pld	W	D	L	GF	GA	GD	Pts	W	D	L	GF	GA	GD	W	D	L	GF	GA	GD
18	4	5	9	20	25	−5	17	1	2	6	9	15	−6	3	3	3	11	10	+1

Last updated: August 22, 2015.
Source: Match reports

==== Results by round ====
Round	1	2	3	4	5	6	7	8	9	10	11	12	13	14	15	16	17	18
Ground	A	H	A	A	H	H	A	H	H	A	A	H	H	A	A	H	H	A
Result	D	L	L	L	L	D	W	L	D	W	W	L	W	D	L	L	L	D
Position	5	7	9	10	10	10	10	10	10	10	8	8	7	8	8	9	9	9

Source: Match reports
A = Away; H = Home; W = Win; D = Draw; L = Loss

==== Match reports ====
13 July 2014 1	FC Edmonton	0 - 0	Ottawa Fury FC	Edmonton, Alberta
17:00 EST UTC−5	Raudales (yellow card) 30'	Report	Richter (yellow card) 7'; Ryan (yellow card) 14'; Jarun (yellow card) 83'	Stadium: Commonwealth Stadium; Attendance: 3,609; Referee: Y. Rudolf

20 July 2014 2	Ottawa Fury FC	0 - 1	New York Cosmos	Ottawa, Ontario
14:00 EST UTC−5		Report	Guenzatti 37', (yellow card) 87'; Ayoze (yellow card) 56'; Stokkelien (yellow card) 89'	Stadium: TD Place Stadium; Attendance: 14,593; Referee: D. Barrie

26 July 2014 3	Carolina RailHawks	3 - 0	Ottawa Fury FC	Cary, North Carolina
18:30 EST UTC−5	Schilawski 10', 38'; Graye (yellow card) 15'; Scott (yellow card) 32'; Albadawi 48'	Report	Davies (yellow card) 55'; Richter (yellow card) 69'; Soria (yellow card) 75'	Stadium: WakeMed Soccer Park; Attendance: 4,294; Referee: K. Terry Jr.

2 August 2014 4	Minnesota United FC	2 - 1	Ottawa Fury FC	Minneapolis, Minnesota
17:00 EST UTC−5	Ramirez 4', 60' (pen.); Daley (yellow card) 29'; Tiago (yellow card) 90'	Report	Eustaquio (yellow card) 46'; Ubiparipović 50'; Beckie (yellow card) 57'	Stadium: TCF Bank Stadium; Attendance: 34,047; Referee: T. Ploeger
Note: Game was played directly after the International Champions Cup match between Olympiacos and Manchester City.

9 August 2014 5	Ottawa Fury FC	1 - 2	Fort Lauderdale Strikers	Ottawa, Ontario
18:00 EST UTC−5	Haworth 10'; Beckie (yellow card) 20'	Report	Picault 16', (yellow card) 44'; King (yellow card) 54', (goal) 76'; Gonzalez (yellow card) 68'	Stadium: TD Place Stadium; Attendance: 4,814; Referee: M. Beaudoin

17 August 2014 6	Ottawa Fury FC	1 - 1	San Antonio Scorpions	Ottawa, Ontario
14:00 EST UTC−5	Ryan (yellow card) 45'; Heinemann (yellow card) 47', (goal) 89'; Trafford (yellow card) 90'	Report	Restrepo (yellow card) 45'; DeRoux (yellow card) 47'; Caesar 76'; Janicki (yellow card) 80'	Stadium: TD Place Stadium; Attendance: 4,277; Referee: R. Schaap

23 August 2014 7	Indy Eleven	1 - 2	Ottawa Fury FC	Indianapolis, Indiana
20:45 EST UTC−5	Okiomah (yellow card) 49'; Smart 84'	Report	Heinemann 70' (pen.); Ubiparipović 86'	Stadium: Michael A. Carroll Stadium; Attendance: 10,285; Referee: C. Penso

30 August 2014 8	Ottawa Fury FC	0 - 2	Tampa Bay Rowdies	Ottawa, Ontario
18:00 EST UTC−5	Davies (yellow card) 76'; Eustaquio (yellow card) 79'	Report	Shriver 29'; Russell 41', (yellow card) 45'; Wallace (yellow card) 76'; Townsend (yellow card) 90'	Stadium: TD Place Stadium; Attendance: 4,206; Referee: Y. Rudolf

7 September 2014 9	Ottawa Fury FC	2 - 2	Carolina RailHawks	Ottawa, Ontario
14:00 EST UTC−5	Heinemann 24'; Peiser (yellow card) 64'; Oliver 90'	Report	Barrera 61'; Shipalane 64'; Fitzgerald (yellow card) 90'; Low (yellow card) 90'	Stadium: TD Place Stadium; Attendance: 5,269; Referee: J. Tasev

13 September 2014 10	Tampa Bay Rowdies	0 - 2	Ottawa Fury FC	St. Petersburg, Florida
18:30 EST UTC−5	Wallace (yellow card) 67'	Report	Oliver 25', (yellow card) 67'; Ubiparipović (yellow card) 74', (goal) 90'	Stadium: Al Lang Stadium; Attendance: 4,340; Referee: R. Vazquez

20 September 2014 11	Atlanta Silverbacks	0 - 3	Ottawa Fury FC	Atlanta, Georgia
18:30 EST UTC−5	Chavez (yellow card) 59'; Cruz (red card) 79'	Report	Mayard 3'; Heinemann (yellow card) 25'; Oliver 38', (yellow card) 44'; Trafford (yellow card) 55'; Beckie (yellow card) 59'; Ryan (yellow card) 65'; Paterson (yellow card) 80'; Haworth 83'	Stadium: Atlanta Silverbacks Park; Attendance: 3,071; Referee: K. Terry Jr.

28 September 2014 12	Ottawa Fury FC	2 - 3	Minnesota United FC	Ottawa, Ontario
14:00 EST UTC−5	Heinemann 16' (pen.); Ryan 55'; Trafford (yellow card) 56'	Report	Tiago (yellow card) 16'; Ibarra 20'; Mendes 23'; Ramirez 88'; Daley (yellow card) 90'; Reed (yellow card) 90'	Stadium: TD Place Stadium; Attendance: 5,094; Referee: C. Grabas

1 October 2014 13	Ottawa Fury FC	2 - 0	Atlanta Silverbacks	Ottawa, Ontario
18:00 EST UTC−5	Dantas 21', (yellow card) 40'; Paterson 34'	Report	Chavez (yellow card) 14'; Burgos (red card) 89'	Stadium: TD Place Stadium; Attendance: 3,105; Referee: Y. Rudolf

4 October 2014 14	San Antonio Scorpions	1 - 1	Ottawa Fury FC	San Antonio, Texas
19:30 EST UTC−5	Castillo 11'; James (yellow card) 16'; Gentile (yellow card) 82'	Report	Ubiparipović (yellow card) 19'; Jarun (yellow card) 21'; Paterson (yellow card) 31'; Oliver (yellow card) 90'; Richter 90'	Stadium: Toyota Field; Attendance: 5,963; Referee: I. Elfath

11 October 2014 15	New York Cosmos	2 - 1	Ottawa Fury FC	Hempstead, New York
18:30 EST UTC−5	Szetela (yellow card) 11'; Díaz 43'; Ayoze (yellow card) 55'; Chirishian 90'	Report	Trafford (yellow card) 31'; Eustaquio (yellow card) 37'; Woodbine (yellow card) 48'; Heinemann 58', (yellow card) 90'; Jarun (yellow card) 63'; Paterson (yellow card) 79'; Richter (yellow card) 84'	Stadium: James M. Shuart Stadium; Attendance: 4,411; Referee: D. Fitzgerald

18 October 2014 16	Ottawa Fury FC	0 - 2	FC Edmonton	Ottawa, Ontario
14:00 EST UTC−5	Dantas (yellow card) 74'	Report	Burt 9'; Laing 20'; Smits (yellow card) 88'; Raudales (yellow card) 90'	Stadium: TD Place Stadium; Attendance: 3,935; Referee: R. Schaap

26 October 2014 17	Ottawa Fury FC	1 - 2	Indy Eleven	Ottawa, Ontario
14:00 EST UTC−5	Oliver (yellow card) 73', (goal) 90'; Ryan (red card) 90'	Report	Jhulliam 29'; Pineda 89', (yellow card) 90'; Peña (red card) 90'	Stadium: TD Place Stadium; Attendance: 4,172; Referee: D. Barrie

1 November 2014 18	Fort Lauderdale Strikers	1 - 1	Ottawa Fury FC	Fort Lauderdale, Florida
18:30 EST UTC−5	Picault (yellow card) 65'; Brown (yellow card) 65'; Hassan 86'	Report	Paterson 16', (yellow card) 65'; Eustaquio (red card) 54'; Oliver (yellow card) 80'; Haworth (yellow card) 82'	Stadium: Lockhart Stadium; Attendance: 5,505; Referee: I. Elfath

=== NASL Combined season ===
==== Standings ====
Pos	Team	Pld	W	D	L	GF	GA	GD	Pts	Qualification
1	Minnesota United (X)	27	16	7	4	47	28	+19	55	Championship qualifiers
2	San Antonio Scorpions (C)	27	16	4	7	43	24	+19	52	Championship qualifiers
3	New York Cosmos	27	11	9	7	37	27	+10	42	Championship qualifiers
4	Fort Lauderdale Strikers	27	11	7	9	38	39	−1	40	Championship qualifiers
5	Carolina RailHawks	27	11	5	11	38	43	−5	38	
6	FC Edmonton	27	10	7	10	34	29	+5	37	
7	Tampa Bay Rowdies	27	7	9	11	36	50	−14	30	
8	Ottawa Fury	27	7	6	14	34	38	−4	27	
9	Indy Eleven	27	6	9	12	35	46	−11	27	
10	Atlanta Silverbacks	27	6	5	16	32	50	−18	23	

(C) Champions; (X) North American Supporters' Trophy winner

==== Results summary ====
Overall								Home						Away					
Pld	W	D	L	GF	GA	GD	Pts	W	D	L	GF	GA	GD	W	D	L	GF	GA	GD
27	7	6	14	34	38	−4	27	3	3	8	18	21	−3	4	3	6	16	17	−1

Last updated: August 22, 2015.
Source: Match reports

==== Results by round ====
Round	1	2	3	4	5	6	7	8	9	10	11	12	13	14	15	16	17	18	19	20	21	22	23	24	25	26	27
Ground	A	H	H	A	H	A	H	H	A	A	H	A	A	H	H	A	H	H	A	A	H	H	A	A	H	H	A
Result	L	L	W	L	D	W	L	W	L	D	L	L	L	L	D	W	L	D	W	W	L	W	D	L	L	L	D
Position	9	9	6	8	8	6	8	6	6	7	8	8	8	9	9	9	9	9	9	8	8	8	8	8	8	8	8

Source: Match reports
A = Away; H = Home; W = Win; D = Draw; L = Loss

=== Canadian Championship ===
==== Canadian Championship review ====
Fury FC's debut in the Canadian Championship was short-lived, as the club was bounced from the competition in the first round by fellow NASL side FC Edmonton, losing 3-1 to the Eddies on aggregate.

The first leg saw the two sides play to a 0-0 draw in the nation's capital, though both managers felt their sides had ample opportunities to win.

The second leg, a week later in Edmonton, saw the Eddies bully a visibly tired Fury FC all over the pitch. Daryl Fordyce opened the scoring for the hosts with a clean finish in the 30th minute, and a Hanson Boakai goal just three minutes into the second half effectively put the match to bed. Fordyce put the proverbial nail in Fury FC's coffin in the 64th, while Vini Dantas scored a consolation goal in injury time for Ottawa.

All things considered, it wasn't a disastrous or entirely unexpected result for Marc Dos Santos' expansion side, but the club's early exit from the competition left the club hungry for another crack at the domestic cup in 2015.

==== Preliminary round ====
23 April 2014 Preliminary Round	Ottawa Fury FC	0 - 0	FC Edmonton	Ottawa, Ontario
19:30 EST UTC−5	Beckie (yellow card) 33'; Dantas (yellow card) 51'; Davies (yellow card) 70'; Mayard (yellow card) 80'	Report	Edward (yellow card) 28'; Ameobi (yellow card) 72'	Stadium: Keith Harris Stadium; Attendance: 2,411; Referee: G. Gamble

30 April 2014 Preliminary Round	FC Edmonton	3 - 1 (3 - 1 agg.)	Ottawa Fury FC	Edmonton, Alberta
21:30 EST UTC−5	Fordyce 30', 62', (yellow card) 61'; Boakai 48'; Edward (yellow card) 24'; Jones (yellow card) 34'	Report	Dantas 90'; Ryan (yellow card) 40'	Stadium: Clarke Stadium; Attendance: 2,001; Referee: D. Fischer

== Squad statistics ==
=== Appearances and goals ===
As of match played 1 November 2014

No.	Pos	Nat	Player	Total		Spring Season		Fall Season		Canadian Championship	
No.	Pos	Nat	Player	Apps	Goals	Apps	Goals	Apps	Goals	Apps	Goals
1	GK	(France) FRA	Romuald Peiser	15	0	0	0	15	0	0	0
2	DF	(Spain) ESP	Ramón Soria	20	0	6	0	13	0	1	0
3	DF	(Canada) CAN	Mason Trafford	29	0	9	0	18	0	2	0
4	DF	(Canada) CAN	Drew Beckie	21	0	9	0	10	0	2	0
5	DF	(Palestine) PLE	Omar Jarun	17	2	7	2	9	0	1	0
6	MF	(Ireland) EIR	Richie Ryan	25	1	8	0	15	1	2	0
8	MF	(Scotland) SCO	Nicki Paterson	17	2	1	0	16	2	0	0
9	FW	(United States) USA	Tom Heinemann	18	6	2	1	16	5	0	0
10	MF	(Bosnia and Herzegovina) BIH	Siniša Ubiparipović	25	4	7	1	17	3	1	0
11	FW	(Brazil) BRA	Oliver Minatel	24	7	8	3	14	4	2	0
12	GK	(Canada) CAN	Chad Bush	0	0	0	0	0	0	0	0
14	MF	(United States) USA	Tony Donatelli	28	4	9	4	17	0	2	0
15	MF	(Canada) CAN	Philippe Davies	25	1	8	1	15	0	2	0
16	DF	(Canada) CAN	Kenny Caceros	2	0	1	0	0	0	1	0
17	FW	(Canada) CAN	Carl Haworth	26	2	9	0	15	2	2	0
19	DF	(Jamaica) JAM	O'Brian Woodbine	5	0	0	0	5	0	0	0
20	MF	(Canada) CAN	Mauro Eustaquio	8	0	3	0	5	0	0	0
21	FW	(Canada) CAN	Pierre-Rudolph Mayard	20	1	6	0	12	1	2	0
22	DF	(United States) USA	Ryan Richter	15	0	0	0	15	0	0	0
24	GK	(Canada) CAN	Marcel de Bellis	0	0	0	0	0	0	0	0
28	FW	(Brazil) BRA	Vini Dantas	28	3	9	1	17	1	2	1
29	GK	(United States) USA	Devala Gorrick	14	0	9	0	3	0	2	0
Players who appeared for Ottawa but left during the season:
7	DF	(Brazil) BRA	Maykon	13	0	7	0	5	0	1	0
13	DF	(Canada) CAN	Andrés Fresenga	5	0	4	0	0	0	1	0
23	MF	(Ghana) GHA	Hamza Elias	5	0	4	0	0	0	1	0
26	MF	(Canada) CAN	Zakaria Messoudi	1	0	0	0	0	0	1	0

=== Goal scorers ===
As of match played 1 November 2014

Place	Position	Nation	Number	Name	NASL	Canadian Championship	Total
1	FW	(Brazil)	11	Oliver Minatel	7	0	7
2	FW	(United States)	9	Tom Heinemann	6	0	6
3	MF	(Bosnia and Herzegovina)	10	Siniša Ubiparipović	4	0	4
3	MF	(United States)	14	Tony Donatelli	4	0	4
5	FW	(Brazil)	28	Vini Dantas	2	1	3
6	DF	(Palestine)	5	Omar Jarun	2	0	2
6	MF	(Scotland)	8	Nicki Paterson	2	0	2
6	FW	(Canada)	17	Carl Haworth	2	0	2
10	MF	(Republic of Ireland)	6	Richie Ryan	1	0	1
10	MF	(Canada)	15	Philippe Davies	1	0	1
10	FW	(Canada)	21	Pierre-Rudolph Mayard	1	0	1
				Own goal	2	0	2
Total					34	1	35

== Transfers ==
=== In ===
No.	Pos.	Player	Transferred from	Fee/notes	Date	Source
8	MF	(Scotland) Nicki Paterson	(United States) Charleston Battery	Free agent	November 6, 2013	
11	FW	(Brazil) Oliver Minatel	(Brazil) Velo Clube	Free agent	November 14, 2013	
17	FW	(Canada) Carl Haworth	(Canada) Ottawa Fury (PDL)	Free agent	November 20, 2013	
6	MF	(Republic of Ireland) Richie Ryan	(Republic of Ireland) Shamrock Rovers	Free agent	December 10, 2013	
6	DF	(Spain) Ramón Soria	(Norway) Gjovik FF	Free agent	December 13, 2013	
20	MF	(Canada) Mauro Eustaquio	(Portugal) SC Pombal	Free agent	December 20, 2013	
5	DF	(Palestine) Omar Jarun	(Belgium) Charleroi	Free agent	January 7, 2014	
13	DF	(Canada) Andrés Fresenga	(Uruguay) Racing	Free agent	January 10, 2014	
24	GK	(Canada) Marcel DeBellis	(Italy) Ascoli	Free agent	January 13, 2014	
23	MF	(Ghana) Hamza Elias	(Ghana) FC Platini Kumasi	Free agent	January 15, 2014	
4	DF	(Canada) Drew Beckie	(United States) Columbus Crew	Free agent	January 22, 2014	
7	DF	(Brazil) Maykon	(Cyprus) AEL Limassol	Free agent	January 30, 2014	
9	FW	(United States) Tom Heinemann	(Canada) Vancouver Whitecaps FC	Free agent	February 6, 2014	
10	MF	(Bosnia and Herzegovina) Siniša Ubiparipović	(Canada) Montreal Impact	Free agent	February 6, 2014	
12	GK	(Canada) Chad Bush	(Canada) Ottawa Fury (PDL)	Free agent	February 19, 2014	
21	FW	(Canada) Pierre-Rudolph Mayard	(United States) Rochester Rhinos	Free agent	February 19, 2014	
15	MF	(Canada) Philippe Davies	(United States) Richmond Kickers	Free agent	February 28, 2014	
28	FW	(Brazil) Vini Dantas	(Finland) FC Lahti	Free agent	March 4, 2014	
3	DF	(Canada) Mason Trafford	(China) Guizhou Zhicheng	Free agent	March 17, 2014	
29	GK	(United States) Devala Gorrick	(Sweden) IK Frej	Free agent	March 19, 2014	
14	MF	(United States) Tony Donatelli	(United States) VSI Tampa Bay FC	Free agent	March 20, 2014	
26	MF	(Canada) Zakaria Messoudi	(Canada) Montreal Impact	Season-long loan	March 28, 2014	
16	DF	(Canada) Kenny Caceros	(United States) Harrisburg City Islanders	Free agent	March 29, 2014	
22	DF	(United States) Ryan Richter	(Canada) Toronto FC	Loan	June 26, 2014	
1	GK	(France) Romuald Peiser	(Portugal) Academica OAF		July 9, 2014	
19	DF	(Jamaica) O'Brian Woodbine	(United States) New England Revolution		September 16, 2014	

=== Out ===
No.	Pos.	Player	Transferred to	Fee/notes	Date	Source
26	MF	(Canada) Zakaria Messoudi	(Canada) Montreal Impact	End of loan	June 23, 2014	
23	MF	(Ghana) Hamza Elias		Released	July 9, 2014	
7	DF	(Brazil) Maykon		Released	August 28, 2014	
13	DF	(Canada) Andrés Fresenga		Released	October 8, 2014	

== Awards ==
=== Player ===
No.	Player	Award	Month	Source
11	(Brazil) Oliver	NASL Player of the Week (Spring week 3)	April	
9	(United States) Tom Heinemann	NASL Play of the Week (Fall week 9)	September	
6	(Republic of Ireland) Richie Ryan	NASL Play of the Week (Fall week 12)	October	
8	(Scotland) Nicki Paterson	Ottawa Fury Community Award	November	
11	(Brazil) Oliver	Ottawa Fury Top Scorer Award	November	
3	(Canada) Mason Trafford	Ottawa Fury Supporters' Player of the Year	November	
6	(Republic of Ireland) Richie Ryan	Ottawa Fury Player of the Year	November	
6	(Republic of Ireland) Richie Ryan	Ottawa Fury Goal of the Year	December	

== Notes ==
- 1.Kickoff time in Eastern time.
- 2.Ottawa Fury goals listed first.
