= 2021 Cavalry FC season =

Cavalry FC
2021 season
- President: Ian Allison
- Head coach: Tommy Wheeldon Jr.
- Stadium: ATCO Field
- Canadian Premier League: 2nd
- CPL playoffs: Semi-finals
- Canadian Championship: Quarter-finals
- Top goalscorer: League: Joe Mason (7); All: Joe Mason (8)
Home colours	Away colours

The 2021 Cavalry FC season was the third season in the history of Cavalry FC.

== Squad ==
As of August 31, 2021

No.	Player	Nationality	Position(s)	Date of birth (age)	Previous club
Goalkeepers
1	Marco Carducci	(Canada)	GK	September 24, 1996 (aged 25)	(Canada) Calgary Foothills
22	Tyson Farago	(Canada)	GK	May 1, 1991 (aged 30)	(Canada) Valour FC
Defenders
2	Nicolas Apostol	(Canada)	FB	January 1, 1999 (aged 22)	(Canada) Whitecaps FC 2
3	Tom Field	(Republic of Ireland)	LB	March 14, 1997 (aged 24)	(Scotland) Dundee F.C.
4	Daan Klomp	(Netherlands)	CB	August 10, 1998 (aged 23)	(Netherlands) NAC Breda
5	Mason Trafford	(Canada)	CB	August 21, 1986 (aged 35)	(United States) Miami City
21	Mohamed Farsi	(Canada)	FB	December 15, 1999 (aged 22)	(Canada) AS Blainville
25	Karifa Yao	(Canada)	CB	September 28, 2000 (aged 21)	(Canada) CF Montréal
Midfielders
6	Nik Ledgerwood	(Canada)	DM / RB	January 16, 1985 (aged 36)	(Canada) Calgary Foothills
8	Elijah Adekugbe	(Canada)	MF	July 17, 1996 (aged 25)	(Canada) Calgary Foothills
10	Sergio Camargo	(Canada)	AM	August 16, 1994 (aged 27)	(Canada) Calgary Foothills
11	José Escalante	(Honduras)	LW	May 29, 1995 (aged 26)	(Honduras) Juticalpa
14	Joseph Di Chiara	(Canada)	DM / CM	January 30, 1992 (aged 29)	(Canada) York9 FC
15	Elliot Simmons	(Canada)	CM	February 5, 1998 (aged 23)	(Canada) HFX Wanderers
16	Victor Loturi	(Canada)	CM	May 21, 2001 (aged 20)	(Canada) Mount Royal Cougars
23	Richard Luca	(Brazil)	LW / RW / AM	January 6, 1998 (aged 23)	(Brazil) Aparecidense
24	David Norman Jr.	(Canada)	MF	May 31, 1998 (aged 23)	(United States) Inter Miami
17	Ben Fisk	(Canada)	RW / LW	February 4, 1993 (aged 28)	(Canada) Atlético Ottawa
26	Max Piepgrass	(Canada)	CM	April 7, 2004 (aged 17)	(Canada) Calgary Foothills
Forwards
7	Oliver Minatel	(Brazil)	ST / LW / RW	August 29, 1992 (aged 29)	(Australia) South Melbourne
9	Anthony Novak	(Canada)	ST	March 27, 1994 (aged 27)	(Portugal) Clube Condeixa
13	Ali Musse	(Somalia)	ST / AM	January 1, 1996 (aged 25)	(Germany) 1. FCA Darmstadt
18	José Hernández	(Canada)	ST	March 19, 2000 (aged 21)	(Canada) Pacific FC
19	Ahinga Selemani	(United States)	FW	March 15, 1996 (aged 25)	(Gibraltar) Lincoln Red Imps
20	Joe Mason	(Republic of Ireland)	FW	May 13, 1991 (aged 30)	(England) Milton Keynes Dons

== Transfers ==
=== In ===
No.	Pos.	Player	From club	Fee/notes	Date	Source
14	MF	(Canada) Joseph Di Chiara	(Canada) York9 FC	Free	November 20, 2020	
19	FW	(United States) Ahinga Selemani	(Gibraltar) Lincoln Red Imps	Free	December 10, 2020	
3	DF	(Republic of Ireland) Tom Field	Unattached	Free	December 28, 2020	
	FW	(Argentina) Matías Roskopf	(Romania) Universitatea Cluj	Free	December 30, 2020	
22	GK	(Canada) Tyson Farago	Unattached	Free	January 21, 2021	
4	DF	(Netherlands) Daan Klomp	(Netherlands) NAC Breda	Free	January 27, 2021	
24	MF	(Canada) David Norman Jr.	(United States) Inter Miami	Free	March 2, 2021	
9	FW	(Canada) Anthony Novak	(Portugal) Clube Condeixa	Free	April 20, 2021	
20	FW	(Republic of Ireland) Joe Mason	(England) Milton Keynes Dons	Free	May 10, 2021	
16	MF	(Canada) Victor Loturi	(Canada) Mount Royal Cougars	Selected 6th overall in the 2021 CPL–U Sports Draft	June 18, 2021	
12	MF	(Canada) Daniel Kaiser	(Canada) UBC Thunderbirds	Signed to a development contract	June 18, 2021	
13	FW	(Somalia) Ali Musse	(Germany) 1. FCA Darmstadt	Free	June 21, 2021	
26	MF	(Canada) Max Piepgrass	(Canada) Calgary Foothills	Signed to a development contract	August 2, 2021	
17	MF	(Canada) Ben Fisk	(Canada) Atlético Ottawa	Free	August 3, 2021	
2	DF	(Canada) Nicolas Apostol	Unattached	Free	August 31, 2021	

==== Loans in ====
No.	Pos.	Player	Loaned from	Fee/notes	Date	Source
25	DF	(Canada) Karifa Yao	(Canada) CF Montréal	Season-long loan	February 3, 2021	

==== Draft picks ====
Cavalry FC selected the following players in the 2021 CPL–U Sports Draft on January 29, 2021. Draft picks are not automatically signed to the team roster. Only those who are signed to a contract will be listed as transfers in.

Round	Selection	Pos.	Player	Nationality	University
1	6	MF	Victor Loturi	Canada	Mount Royal Cougars
2	11	DF	Ethan Keen	Canada	Mount Royal Cougars

=== Out ===
No.	Pos.	Player	To club	Fee/notes	Date	Source
9	MF	(England) Jordan Brown	(Germany) VfR Aalen	Contract expired	October 22, 2020	
19	FW	(Peru) Jair Córdova	(Peru) Alianza Universidad	Contract expired	November 9, 2020	
22	GK	(Canada) Niko Giantsopoulos	(Canada) York United	Contract expired	November 9, 2020	
29	FW	(Canada) Marcus Haber	(Cambodia) Visakha FC	Contract expired	November 9, 2020	
3	DF	(England) Nathan Mavila	(Sweden) IK Brage	Contract expired	November 9, 2020	
4	DF	(Canada) Dominick Zator	(Canada) York United	Contract expired	January 26, 2021	
14	DF	(Canada) Jonathan Wheeldon		Contract expired	January 26, 2021	
16	MF	(Canada) Bruno Zebie		Contract expired	January 26, 2021	
12	DF	(Canada) Dean Northover	Retired		January 26, 2021	
	FW	(Argentina) Matías Roskopf		Contract terminated by mutual consent	April 15, 2021	
17	MF	(Canada) Nico Pasquotti		Contract expired	June 24, 2021	
23	MF	(Canada) Tofa Fakunle		Contract expired	June 24, 2021	
24	FW	(Canada) Aribim Pepple	(Spain) Getafe CF	Contract expired	June 24, 2021	
12	DF	(Canada) Daniel Kaiser	(Canada) UBC Thunderbirds	Developmental contract expired	August 31, 2021	

==== Loans out ====
No.	Pos.	Player	Loaned to	Fee/notes	Date	Source
11	MF	(Honduras) José Escalante	(Honduras) C.D.S. Vida	Loaned until January 2021	September 9, 2020	

== Competitions ==
=== Canadian Premier League ===
==== Table ====
Pos	Team	Pld	W	D	L	GF	GA	GD	Pts	Qualification
1	Forge (S)	28	16	2	10	39	24	+15	50	Advance to playoffs
2	Cavalry	28	14	8	6	34	30	+4	50	Advance to playoffs
3	Pacific (C)	28	13	6	9	47	34	+13	45	Advance to playoffs
4	York United	28	8	12	8	35	39	−4	36	Advance to playoffs
5	Valour	28	10	5	13	38	36	+2	35	
6	HFX Wanderers	28	8	11	9	28	34	−6	35	
7	FC Edmonton	28	6	10	12	34	41	−7	28	
8	Atlético Ottawa	28	6	8	14	30	47	−17	26	

Updated to match(es) played on unknown. Source: CanPL.ca
Rules for classification: 1) points; 2) total wins.
(C) Champions; (S) Regular season winner

==== Results by match ====
Match	1	2	3	4	5	6	7	8	9	10	11	12	13	14	15	16	17	18	19	20	21	22	23	24	25	26	27	28
Result	W	W	D	L	L	D	W	W	L	W	W	D	W	D	W	W	L	D	L	W	D	D	W	D	W	L	W	W
Position	3	1	2	2	3	4	4	3	4	3	2	2	2	3	2	2	2	2	3	3	3	3	2	2	1	3	2	2

Source: #Matches
W = Win; D = Draw; L = Loss

==== Matches ====
June 27 1	Cavalry FC	2–1	York United FC	Winnipeg, Manitoba
3:00pm	Camargo 32'; Escalante 51'; Di Chiara (yellow card) 86'; Norman Jr. (yellow card) 90+1'	Report	Petrasso (yellow card) 50'; Abzi 79'	Stadium: IG Field; Attendance: 0 Referee: Juan Marquez

June 30 2	Atlético Ottawa	1–4	Cavalry FC	Winnipeg, Manitoba
8:00pm	Acosta 24'; McKendry (yellow card) 68'; Beckie (yellow card) 75'	Report	Selemani 9', 43'; Loturi 75'; Simmons 78'	Stadium: IG Field; Attendance: 0 Referee: Fabrizio Stasolla

July 3 3	Cavalry FC	0–0	HFX Wanderers FC	Winnipeg, Manitoba
5:00pm	Ledgerwood (yellow card) 45+4'; Kaiser (yellow card) 53'; Escalante (yellow card) 85'; Simmons (yellow card) 89'	Report	Polisi (yellow card) 67'	Stadium: IG Field; Attendance: 0 Referee: David Barrie

July 8 4	Cavalry FC	0–2	Forge FC	Winnipeg, Manitoba
6:00pm	Di Chiara (yellow card) 25'; Ledgerwood (yellow card) 90+1'	Report	Bekker 13', 35'; Achinioti-Jönsson (yellow card) 69'	Stadium: IG Field; Attendance: 0 Referee: Alain Ruch

July 11 5	Cavalry FC	0–2	Atlético Ottawa	Winnipeg, Manitoba
7:00pm	Farsi (yellow card) 26'; Novak (yellow card) 90+3'	Report	Acosta (yellow card) 31'; Beckie (yellow card) 54'; Shaw 75'; Coupland 90+7'	Stadium: IG Field; Attendance: 0 Referee: Yusri Rudolf

July 14 6	York United FC	0–0	Cavalry FC	Winnipeg, Manitoba
5:00pm	Johnston (yellow card) 40'	Report	Norman Jr. (yellow card) 40'; Novak (yellow card) 53'; Ledgerwood (yellow card) 57'; Loturi (yellow card) 76'	Stadium: IG Field; Attendance: 0 Referee: Filip Dujic

July 17 7	HFX Wanderers FC	1–2	Cavalry FC	Winnipeg, Manitoba
12:00pm	Restrepo (yellow card) 24'; Doner (yellow card) 57'; Kreim (yellow card) 84'; Salter 87'	Report	Novak 45+2'; Musse 52'; Selemani (yellow card) 55'; Escalante (yellow card) 60'; Loturi (yellow card) 83'; Klomp (yellow card) 90+3'	Stadium: IG Field; Attendance: 0 Referee: Alain Ruch

July 22 8	Forge FC	1–2	Cavalry FC	Winnipeg, Manitoba
6:00pm	Henry (yellow card) 63'; Babouli 86' (pen.)	Report	Norman Jr. (yellow card) 6'; Novak 12', (yellow card) 63'; Musse 33'; Luca (yellow card) 45+4'; Escalante (yellow card) 86'; Simmons (yellow card) 90+2'; Farsi (yellow card) 90+5'	Stadium: IG Field; Attendance: 0 Referee: David Barrie

July 30 9	Pacific FC	2–0	Cavalry FC	Langford, British Columbia
7:30 pm	Bustos 3'; Blasco (yellow card) 14'; MacNaughton (yellow card) 45'; Baldisimo (yellow card) 79'; dos Santos 86'; Heard (yellow card) 90+3'	Report	Loturi (yellow card) 19'; Ledgerwood (yellow card) 24'; Novak (yellow card) 66'	Stadium: Starlight Stadium; Referee: Carly Shaw-MacLaren

August 3 10 Wildrose Cup	Cavalry FC	2–1	FC Edmonton	Calgary, Alberta
7:00 pm	Yao (yellow card) 16'; Mason 64'; Klomp 71'	Report	Mabussi (yellow card) 10'; Ongaro 19'; Temguia (yellow card) 85'	Stadium: ATCO Field

August 8 11	Cavalry FC	1–0	Valour FC	Calgary, Alberta
2:00 pm	Escalante (yellow card) 33'; Farsi 41'; Ledgerwood (yellow card) 56'; Farsi (yellow card) 57'	Report	Levis (yellow card) 16'; Sirois (yellow card) 45'; Ohin (yellow card) 50'; Romeo (yellow card) 66'	Stadium: ATCO Field; Referee: Mathieu Souaré

August 11 12	Cavalry FC	0–0	Pacific FC	Foothills County, Alberta
7:00 pm	Simmons (yellow card) 31'; Novak (yellow card) 51'	Report	Dixon (yellow card) 16'; Heard (yellow card) 30'; dos Santos (yellow card) 90+5'	Stadium: ATCO Field; Attendance: 2,394; Referee: Juan Marquez

August 20 13	Pacific FC	1–2	Cavalry FC	Langford, British Columbia
7:30 pm	Hojabrpour (yellow card) 79'; Campbell 83' (pen.); dos Santos (red card) 83'; Heard (yellow card) 90+2'	Report	Mason (yellow card) 17', (goal) 23', 29'; Klomp (yellow card) 70'; Escalante (yellow card) 83'; Yao (yellow card) 90+2'	Stadium: Starlight Stadium; Attendance: 2,740; Referee: David Barrie

August 29 14 Wildrose Cup	Cavalry FC	2–2	FC Edmonton	Calgary, Alberta
2:00 pm	Di Chiara (yellow card) 14', (goal) 30'; Mason 90'; Loturi (yellow card) 90+6'	Report	Gonzalez 7'; Aird 36' (pen.); Najem (yellow card) 87'	Stadium: ATCO Field; Attendance: 3,489; Referee: Fabrizio Stasolla

September 1 15 Wildrose Cup	FC Edmonton	0–1	Cavalry FC	Edmonton, Alberta
7:00 pm	Gorskie (yellow card) 90+2'	Report	Trafford (yellow card) 6'; Novak 26'; Di Chiara (yellow card) 45'	Stadium: Clarke Stadium; Attendance: 470; Referee: Yusri Rudolf

September 4 16	Valour FC	0–1	Cavalry FC	Winnipeg, Manitoba
4:30 pm	Galhardo (yellow card) 37'; Ricci (yellow card) 38'; Mikhael (yellow card) 44'; Ohin (yellow card) 45+2'; Baquero (yellow card) 90'; Romeo (red card) 90+8'	Report	Camargo (yellow card) 21'; Yao (yellow card) 30'; Mason 32'; Trafford (yellow card) 37'; Farsi (yellow card) 38'; Ledgerwood (yellow card) 42'; Fisk (yellow card) 52'; Novak (yellow card) 90+8'	Stadium: IG Field; Referee: Carly Shaw-MacLaren

September 9 17	Pacific FC	3–1	Cavalry FC	Langford, British Columbia
7:00 pm	Aparicio (yellow card) 40', (goal) 89'; Campbell 45+1'; Bassett 66'; Chung (yellow card) 76'	Report	Camargo 32'; Mason (yellow card) 60'; Escalante (yellow card) 76'	Stadium: Starlight Stadium; Attendance: 2,350

September 18 18	Valour FC	1-1	Cavalry FC	Winnipeg, Manitoba
2:00 pm	Fordyce (yellow card) 17'; Alemán 71'; Dyer (yellow card) 81'; Galán (yellow card) 84'; Reyes (yellow card) 89'	Report	Ledgerwood 54'; Farsi (yellow card) 88'	Stadium: IG Field; Attendance: 3,000; Referee: Fabrizio Stasolla

September 25 19	Atlético Ottawa	3–1	Cavalry FC	Ottawa, Ontario
2:30 pm	Beckie 2', (yellow card) 59'; Shaw 39' (pen.); McKendry (yellow card) 59'; Wright 72'	Report	Loturi 18'; Carducci (yellow card) 38'; Norman (yellow card) 62'; Hernández (yellow card) 85'	Stadium: TD Place Stadium; Attendance: 3,648; Referee: Pierre-Luc Lauzière

September 29 20 Wildrose Cup	FC Edmonton	2–3	Cavalry FC	Edmonton, Alberta
8:00 pm	Ongaro 47'; Didic 70'; Esua (red card) 84'	Report	Fisk 34'; Escalante (yellow card) 35'; Selemani 44'; Klomp 80'; Farsi (yellow card) 90+2'	Stadium: Clarke Stadium; Attendance: 991

October 5 21	Valour FC	0–0	Cavalry FC	Winnipeg, Manitoba
6:00 pm	Ulloa (yellow card) 51'; Levis (yellow card) 72'	Report	Norman Jr. (yellow card) 64'	Stadium: IG Field; Attendance: 2,600; Referee: David Barrie

October 9 22 Wildrose Cup	Cavalry FC	1–1	FC Edmonton	Calgary, Alberta
2:00 pm	Luca 20'; Camargo (yellow card) 38'; Ledgerwood (yellow card) 64'	Report	Velado-Tsegaye 15'; Najem (yellow card) 90+2'	Stadium: ATCO Field; Attendance: 3,102; Referee: Alain Ruch

October 14 23	Cavalry FC	2–1	York United	Calgary, Alberta
7:00 pm	Camargo 20'; Di Chiara (yellow card) 40' (yellow-red card) 40+3'; Escalante (yellow card) 45+3'; C. N'sa 80' (o.g.)	Report	Johnston 5' (yellow card) 45+3'; Wilson (yellow card) 72'; C. N'sa (yellow card) 77'	Stadium: ATCO Field; Attendance: 1,925; Referee: David Barrie

October 17 24	Cavalry FC	0–0	HFX Wanderers	Calgary, Alberta
2:00 pm	Klomp (yellow card) 73'	Report	Riggi (yellow card) 26'; Santos (yellow card) 46'	Stadium: ATCO Field; Attendance: 2,756; Referee: David Gantar

October 21 25	Cavalry FC	2–1	Pacific FC	Calgary, Alberta
7:00 pm	Klomp 6', (yellow card) 32'; Norman Jr. 71'	Report	Díaz (yellow card) 32'; Hojabrpour (yellow card) 71'; Young 89'; MacNaughton (yellow card) 90+3'	Stadium: ATCO Field; Attendance: 2,082; Referee: Pierre-Luc Lauzière

October 30 26	Cavalry FC	2–4	Valour FC	Calgary, Alberta
1:30 pm	Camargo 14', (yellow card) 63'; Mason 38'; Yao (yellow card) 60'; Loturi (yellow card) 90'	Report	Romeo (yellow card) 8'; Dyer 9'; Galán (yellow card) 39'; Akio 43', 69'; Bustos 90+4'	Stadium: ATCO Field; Attendance: 2,411; Referee: Juan Marquez

November 7 27	Cavalry FC	1–0	Pacific FC	Calgary, Alberta
1:30 pm	Mason 16'; Norman Jr. (yellow card) 42'; Trafford (yellow card) 80'	Report	Chung (yellow card) 24'; Dada-Luke (yellow card) 26'; Dixon (yellow card) 33'; Aparicio (yellow card) 36'	Stadium: ATCO Field; Attendance: 2,408; Referee: David Gantar

November 16 28	Forge FC	0–1	Cavalry FC	Hamilton, Ontario
4:00 pm	Cela (yellow card) 25'; Achinioti-Jönsson (yellow card) 32'; Bekker (yellow card) 76'; Babouli (yellow card) 90+3'	Report	Novak 3'; Minatel (yellow card) 28'; Apostol (yellow card) 48'; Norman Jr. (yellow card) 75'	Stadium: Tim Hortons Field; Attendance: 2,104; Referee: Alain Ruch

==== Playoff matches ====
November 20 SF	Cavalry FC	1–2 (a.e.t.)	Pacific FC	Calgary, Alberta
1:00pm	Yao 47'; Escalante (yellow card) 90+1'	Report	Campbell 33'; Heard (yellow card) 52'; Blasco (yellow card) 97'; Carducci 105' (o.g.)	Stadium: ATCO Field; Attendance: 2,927; Referee: Pierre-Luc Lauzière

=== Canadian Championship ===
August 21 PR	FC Edmonton	0–2	Cavalry FC	Edmonton, Alberta
3:00 PM		Report	Mason 31'; Fisk 62'	Stadium: Clarke Stadium; Attendance: 1,189; Referee: Yusri Rudolf

September 22 QF	Cavalry FC	0–1	Pacific FC	Calgary, Alberta
8:00pm	Escalante (yellow card) 33'	Report	Campbell 33'; Díaz (yellow card) 35'; Young (yellow card) 90+2'	Stadium: ATCO Field; Referee: Alain Ruch

== Statistics ==
=== Squad and statistics ===
No.	Pos	Nat	Player	Total			Canadian Premier League			Canadian Championship		
No.	Pos	Nat	Player	Apps	Goals	Assists	Apps	Goals	Assists	Apps	Goals	Assists
2	FW	(Canada)	Nicolas Apostol	7	0	1	7	0	1	0	0	0
3	DF	(England)	Tom Field	12	0	1	12	0	1	0	0	0
4	DF	(Netherlands)	Daan Klomp	26	3	0	24	3	0	2	0	0
5	DF	(Canada)	Mason Trafford	16	0	0	14	0	0	2	0	0
6	MF	(Canada)	Nik Ledgerwood	22	1	0	20	1	0	2	0	0
7	FW	(Brazil)	Oliver Minatel	3	0	0	3	0	0	0	0	0
9	FW	(Canada)	Anthony Novak	27	4	2	25	4	2	2	0	0
10	MF	(Canada)	Sergio Camargo	25	4	2	23	4	2	2	0	0
11	MF	(Honduras)	José Escalante	28	1	3	26	1	3	2	0	0
12	DF	(Canada)	Daniel Kaiser	11	0	0	11	0	0	0	0	0
13	FW	(Somalia)	Ali Musse	9	2	0	9	2	0	0	0	0
14	MF	(Canada)	Joseph Di Chiara	26	1	3	25	1	3	1	0	0
15	MF	(England)	Elliot Simmons	27	1	0	25	1	0	2	0	0
16	MF	(Canada)	Victor Loturi	29	2	1	28	2	1	1	0	0
17	MF	(Canada)	Ben Fisk	20	2	5	18	1	5	2	1	0
18	MF	(Canada)	José Hernández	19	0	0	17	0	0	2	0	0
19	FW	(United States)	Ahinga Selemani	18	3	2	17	3	2	1	0	0
20	FW	(Republic of Ireland)	Joe Mason	16	8	0	15	7	0	1	1	0
21	DF	(Canada)	Mohamed Farsi	28	1	3	26	1	2	2	0	1
23	FW	(Brazil)	Richard Luca	18	1	0	18	1	0	0	0	0
24	MF	(Canada)	David Norman Jr.	26	1	1	24	1	1	2	0	0
25	DF	(Canada)	Karifa Yao	28	1	0	26	1	0	2	0	0
26	MF	(Canada)	Max Piepgrass	3	0	0	2	0	0	1	0	0

==== Goalkeepers ====
No.	Nat	Player	Total			Canadian Premier League			Canadian Championship		
No.	Nat	Player	Apps	Conceded	Shutouts	Apps	Conceded	Shutouts	Apps	Conceded	Shutouts
1	(Canada)	Marco Carducci	26	32	7	25	31	7	1	1	0
22	(Canada)	Tyson Farago	5	1	4	4	1	3	1	0	1
