= Mason Trafford =

American association football player

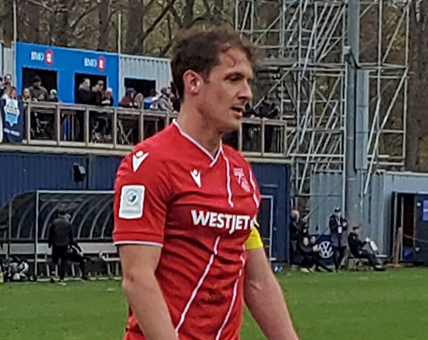
- Trafford with Cavalry in 2022

Personal information
- Full name: Mason Trafford
- Date of birth: August 21, 1986 (age 40)
- Place of birth: Boynton Beach, Florida, United States
- Height: 1.88 m (6 ft 2 in)
- Position: Defender

Youth career
- North Shore Selects

College career
Years	Team	Apps	(Gls)
2004–2007	UNLV Rebels	66	(2)

Senior career*
Years	Team	Apps	(Gls)
2008	Whitecaps Residency	4	(0)
2008–2009	Vancouver Whitecaps	37	(0)
2010	Real Maryland Monarchs	20	(2)
2010–2012	IFK Mariehamn	65	(2)
2013	Guizhou Zhicheng	29	(0)
2014–2015	Ottawa Fury	52	(1)
2016–2018	Miami FC	57	(0)
2019–2022	Cavalry FC	62	(1)
Total		279	(6)

International career
2013	Canada	1	(0)
- * Club domestic league appearances and goals

Mason Trafford (born August 21, 1986) is a Canadian former soccer player who most recently played for Canadian Premier League club Cavalry FC. Besides Canada, Trafford has played in the United States, Finland, and China.

== Club career ==
=== Youth and amateur ===
Born in Boynton Beach, Florida, Trafford grew up in North Vancouver, attended Handsworth Secondary School, and played club soccer for the North Shore Selects. Trafford honed his skills under the eye of soccer coach Roman Tulis, and played for 2 years on the British Columbia provincial team, before going on to play four years of college soccer at University of Nevada, Las Vegas. He was team captain in his final year with the Rebels, and in addition to soccer he maintained top marks at school, graduating with a Bachelor of Science/Accounting degree.

=== Vancouver Whitecaps ===
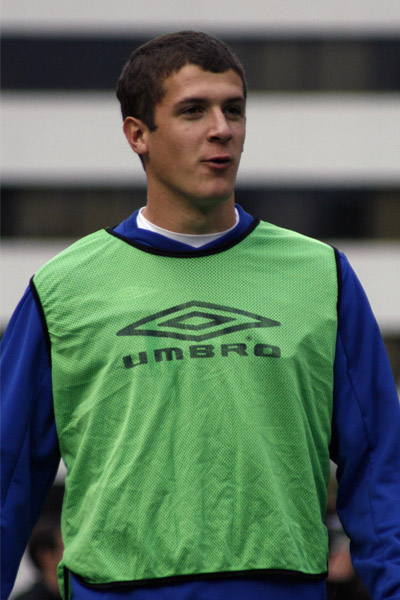
Trafford with Vancouver Whitecaps in 2008.

Trafford signed a one-year contract with the Vancouver Whitecaps in June 2008, after finishing his fall semester at UNLV. He went on to play 14 games in the USL First Division in 2008, and was re-signed by the Whitecaps on December 3, 2008 for the 2009 season. Trafford played 23 games in 2009 as the team again reached the USL Championship game, eventually losing out to the Montreal Impact. Trafford played a variety of roles for the Vancouver Whitecaps.

=== Real Maryland Monarchs ===
In an effort to develop at one position, he signed with Real Maryland Monarchs under coach Anthony Hudson to be the club's left sided central defender. Trafford would go on to score two goals and played every minute during the club's 2010 campaign that ended in August 2010, allowing him to transition to a European club.

=== Mariehamn ===
On August 29, 2010, after impressing on trial, Trafford signed a 6-month contract with a 2-year option with Finnish club IFK Mariehamn. IFK Mariehamn picked up the option after Trafford played all seven matches to conclude the 2010 season. Mason would go on to play every match available throughout his IFK Mariehamn career.

=== Guizhou Zhicheng ===
Trafford rejected a new contract with IFK Mariehamn in order to test the free agency market. Trafford considered offers from Sweden, Finland and North America and participated in his first Canada national team camp in Phoenix, Arizona and Houston, Texas with friendlies against Denmark and the United States. Immediately after, he went on trial with Seattle Sounders FC for a week but could not play in a friendly match against the Portland Timbers due to having food poisoning the night prior, along with several other teammates. He then elected to go on trial in China where he was once again successful. On February 23, 2013, Trafford signed with China League One club Guizhou Zhicheng for 1 year as one of the club's three international players.

=== Ottawa Fury ===
On March 17, 2014, Trafford signed with North American Soccer League expansion club Ottawa Fury FC. In the club's first professional season, Trafford played a key role at centre-back, appearing in all 29 of the Fury's matches in all competitions and earning himself the club's Supporters' Player of the Year award.

In the 2015 season, the club's acquisition of centre-backs Colin Falvey and Rafael Alves pushed Trafford out of the starting lineup for much of the Spring season, however after discussions with management he was given an opportunity to play at left-back, a position he had played previously at IFK Mariehamn. Trafford was very successful and helped start a remarkable and record-breaking defensive run by the Fury during which they lost only one match and conceded by far the fewest goals of any club in the league, earning the club the NASL Fall Championship title and its first-ever berth in the Soccer Bowl playoffs. At the end of the season, Trafford once again earned the Fury Supporters' Player of the Year award.

=== Miami FC ===
On October 1, 2015, Trafford signed a contract extension with Ottawa through 2017. However, on February 4, 2016, a clause in Trafford's contract requiring the club to transfer him if a certain minimum fee was met was activated by expansion club Miami FC, sending him instead to his birthplace of Florida for the 2016 season. At the time of his departure, he was the Fury's all-time appearance leader.

=== Cavalry FC ===
On February 27, 2019 Trafford signed with Canadian Premier League club Cavalry FC. In November 2019, Cavalry would confirm that Trafford would return for the 2020 season. In November 2020, Trafford would re-sign with the club for the 2021 season, his third season with the club. In February 2022, Trafford would once again re-sign with the club for the 2022 season. On April 7, 2022, following the retirement of previous club captain Nikolas Ledgerwood, Trafford was named club captain ahead of the start of the season. On February 10, 2023, the club announced that Trafford had retired from professional soccer and would be taking a role in the front office.

== International career ==
On January 18, 2013, Trafford received his first call up by the Canada national team for friendlies against Denmark and the United States. He made his senior team debut on January 26 in a friendly against Denmark as a second half sub for Tosaint Ricketts, the game ended as a 4–0 defeat.

== Personal life ==
His cousin Charlie Trafford is also a professional soccer player. In 2013, Mason arranged for Charlie to sign for his former club IFK Mariehamn. In February 2022, they became teammates, with Charlie returning to Canada to sign a contract with Cavalry FC.

== Career statistics ==
As of October 23, 2022

Club statistics
Club	Season	League			National Cup (Note: Includes the Canadian Championship, U.S. Open Cup and Finnish Cup.)		League Cup (Note: Includes the Finnish League Cup.)		Continental		Other (Note: Includes the USL First Division Playoffs, Soccer Bowl and Canadian Premier League Finals.)		Total	
Club	Season	Division	Apps	Goals	Apps	Goals	Apps	Goals	Apps	Goals	Apps	Goals	Apps	Goals
Vancouver Whitecaps	2009	USL First Division	23	0	3	0	—		—		1	0	27	0
Real Maryland Monarchs	2010	USL Second Division	20	2	2	0	—		—		0	0	22	2
Mariehamn	2010	Veikkausliiga	7	1	0	0	0	0	—		0	0	7	1
Mariehamn	2011	Veikkausliiga	28	1	2	0	6	1	—		0	0	36	2
Mariehamn	2012	Veikkausliiga	30	0	2	0	1	0	—		0	0	33	0
Mariehamn	Total		65	2	4	0	7	1	0	0	0	0	76	3
Ottawa Fury	2014	NASL	27	0	2	0	—		—		0	0	29	0
Ottawa Fury	2015	NASL	25	1	1	0	—		—		2	0	28	1
Ottawa Fury	Total		52	1	3	0	0	0	0	0	2	0	57	1
Miami FC	2016	NASL	31	0	1	0	—		—		0	0	32	0
Miami FC	2017	NASL	26	0	5	0	—		—		1	0	32	0
Miami FC	2018	NPSL	?	?	1	0	—		—		0	0	1	0
Miami FC	Total		57	0	7	0	0	0	0	0	1	0	65	0
Cavalry FC	2019	Canadian Premier League	20	0	6	0	—		—		2	0	28	0
Cavalry FC	2020	Canadian Premier League	8	0	0	0	—		—		0	0	8	0
Cavalry FC	2021	Canadian Premier League	13	0	2	0	—		—		1	0	16	0
Cavalry FC	2022	Canadian Premier League	21	1	2	0	2	0	—		0	0	25	1
Cavalry FC	Total		62	1	10	0	2	0	0	0	3	0	77	1
Career total			279	6	29	0	9	1	0	0	7	0	324	7

== Honours ==
=== Club ===
Ottawa Fury

- North American Soccer League Fall Championship: 2015

Calvary FC

- Canadian Premier League Finals
  - Runners-up: 2019
- Canadian Premier League (Regular season):
  - Champions: Spring 2019, Fall 2019
