= Gareth Smith-Doyle =

Canadian soccer player

Personal information
- Date of birth: June 10, 2002 (age 24)
- Place of birth: Calgary, Alberta, Canada
- Height: 1.87 m (6 ft 1 1/2 in)
- Position: Forward

Team information
- Current team: Calgary Foothills FC
- Number: 9

Youth career
- Calgary Foothills FC
- Cavalry FC

College career
| Years | Team | Apps | (Gls) |
| 2021 | Calgary Dinos | 10 | (2) |

Senior career*
| Years | Team | Apps | (Gls) |
| 2022–2023 | Cavalry FC | 21 | (1) |
| 2024– | Calgary Foothills FC | 8 | (4) |
- * Club domestic league appearances and goals as of July 24, 2024

Gareth Smith-Doyle (born June 10, 2002) is a Canadian soccer player who plays as a forward for League1 Alberta club Calgary Foothills FC.

== Early life ==
Smith-Doyle played youth soccer with Calgary Foothills SC. He later played with the Cavalry FC U20 in the Alberta Major Soccer League.

== University career ==
In 2021, he began attending the University of Calgary, where he played for the men's soccer team. He made his debut on September 24 against the Mount Royal Cougars. He scored his first two goals for the Dinos on October 8 against the Saskatchewan Huskies. He was named to the Canada West Conference All-Rookie Team.

== Club career ==
In August 2022, he signed a multi-year professional contract with Cavalry FC in the Canadian Premier League. In his debut season, Smith-Doyle would make 5 appearances for Cavalry. Upon completion of the 2022 season, it was clarified that Smith-Doyle was signed for the 2023 season, with a club option for 2024. On September 29, 2023, he scored his first professional goal, netting the game-winner, in a 2-1 victory over Valour FC. Upon completion of the 2023 season, Smith-Doyle's club option for the 2024 season would be declined, ending his time with the club.

== Career statistics ==
As of match played July 26, 2024

| Club | Season | League | | | Playoffs | | Domestic Cup | | Other | | Total | |
| Club | Season | Division | Apps | Goals | Apps | Goals | Apps | Goals | Apps | Goals | Apps | Goals |
|---|---|---|---|---|---|---|---|---|---|---|---|---|
| Cavalry FC | 2022 | Canadian Premier League | 5 | 0 | 0 | 0 | 0 | 0 | — | | 5 | 0 |
| Cavalry FC | 2023 | Canadian Premier League | 16 | 1 | 0 | 0 | 0 | 0 | — | | 16 | 1 |
| Cavalry FC | Total | | 21 | 1 | 0 | 0 | 0 | 0 | 0 | 0 | 21 | 1 |
| Calgary Foothills FC | 2024 | League1 Alberta | 8 | 4 | 1 | 0 | — | | — | | 9 | 4 |
| Career total | | | 29 | 5 | 1 | 0 | 0 | 0 | 0 | 0 | 30 | 5 |
