= Skyler Rogers =

Canadian soccer player (born 2004)

Personal information
- Full name: Skyler Gray Rogers
- Date of birth: January 27, 2004 (age 22)
- Place of birth: Calgary, Alberta, Canada
- Height: 5 ft 9 in (1.75 m)
- Position: Midfielder

Team information
- Current team: Calgary Foothills

Youth career
- Calgary Foothills

College career
Years	Team	Apps	(Gls)
2022–	Mount Royal Cougars	69	(3)

Senior career*
Years	Team	Apps	(Gls)
2022	Cavalry FC	3	(0)
2024	Calgary Foothills	9	(1)
2025–	Calgary Rangers	20	(1)
- * Club domestic league appearances and goals as of May 29, 2026

Skyler Gray Rogers (born January 27, 2004) is a Canadian soccer player who plays as a midfielder for Calgary Rangers in League1 Alberta.

== Early life ==
He played youth soccer with Calgary Foothills FC. He played for Team Alberta at the 2022 Canada Summer Games.

== University career ==
In 2022, he began attending Mount Royal University, where he played for the men's soccer team. He scored his first goal on September 18 against the Trinity Western Spartans.

== Club career ==
In 2022, Rogers signed a developmental contract with Cavalry FC of the Canadian Premier League. In August 2022, he departed the club per terms of his developmental contract to head to university. Rogers would play for League1 Alberta club Calgary Foothills in the 2023 League1 Alberta Exhibition Series.

== Career statistics ==
As of match played September 9, 2026

Club	Season	League			Playoffs		Domestic Cup		Other		Total	
Club	Season	Division	Apps	Goals	Apps	Goals	Apps	Goals	Apps	Goals	Apps	Goals
Cavalry FC	2022	Canadian Premier League	3	0	0	0	0	0	—		3	0
Calgary Foothills FC	2024	League1 Alberta	10	2	1	0	—		—		11	2
Calgary Rangers	2025	League1 Alberta	13	1	—		—		—		13	1
Calgary Rangers	2026	Alberta Premier League	7	0	—		—		—		7	0
Calgary Rangers	Total		20	1	0	0	0	0	0	0	20	1
Career total			32	3	1	0	0	0	0	0	33	3
