= Charlie Trafford =

Canadian soccer player

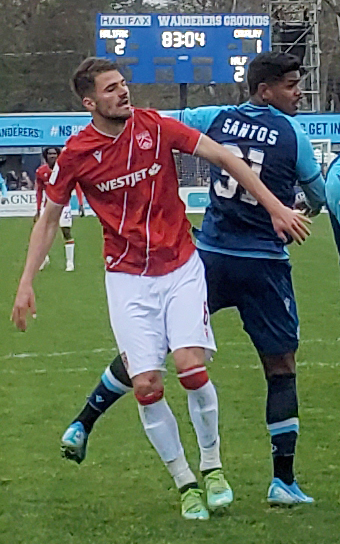
- Trafford with Cavalry in 2022

Personal information
- Date of birth: 24 May 1992 (age 34)
- Place of birth: Calgary, Alberta, Canada
- Height: 1.92 m (6 ft 3 1/2 in)
- Position: Midfielder

Youth career
- Calgary Foothills
- Vancouver Whitecaps
- De Graafschap

College career
Years	Team	Apps	(Gls)
2012	York Lions	15	(2)

Senior career*
Years	Team	Apps	(Gls)
2012	SC Toronto		
2013–2014	IFK Mariehamn	7	(2)
2014	TPS	5	(0)
2014–2015	KuPS	49	(8)
2016–2017	Korona Kielce	3	(0)
2016–2017	Korona Kielce II	14	(2)
2017	Sandecja Nowy Sącz	8	(0)
2017	RoPS	6	(1)
2017–2020	Inverness Caledonian Thistle	70	(1)
2020–2021	Hamilton Academical	17	(0)
2021–2022	Wrexham	0	(0)
2022–2025	Cavalry FC	68	(1)

International career
2015–2017	Canada	3	(0)
- * Club domestic league appearances and goals

Charlie Trafford (born 24 May 1992) is a Canadian former professional soccer player who played as a midfielder.

== Club career ==
=== Youth and college ===
Born in Calgary, Alberta, Trafford spent time playing local youth soccer before joining the Whitecaps Residency. He later played college soccer with York University, and also spent time with Dutch club De Graafschap. In 2012, he played with SC Toronto of the Canadian Soccer League.

=== Finland ===
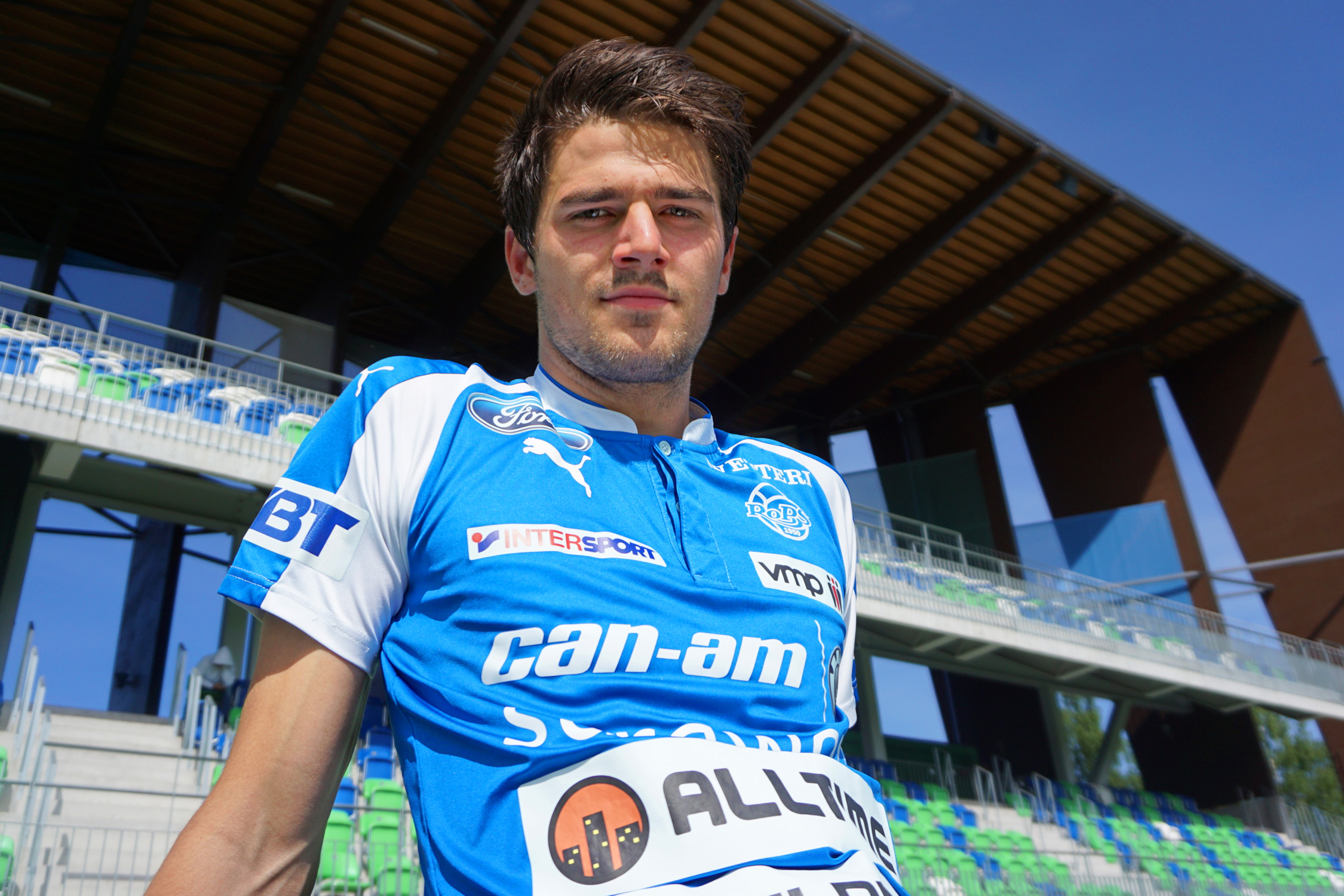

Trafford began his senior professional career in Finland, playing with IFK Mariehamn, TPS and KuPS. While with KuPS, Trafford won their 2014 Player of the Year and Goal of the Year awards.

=== Poland ===
Trafford signed with Ekstraklasa club Korona Kielce on 24 November 2015 and joined the club on 1 January 2016. He made his debut against Pogoń Szczecin on 15 February 2016. Trafford would struggle to receive playing time with Korona Kielce, and in March 2017 would transfer to I liga side Sandecja Nowy Sącz.

=== Return to Finland ===
Trafford returned to Finland and signed with RoPS on 14 July 2017. He made his debut for them against FC Lahti on 16 July.

=== Scotland ===
After only a month with RoPS, Trafford transferred to Scottish side Inverness Caledonian Thistle on 18 August 2017. He made his debut the next day against Greenock Morton. Trafford would start regularly for the club during his first two months, but would lose his starting spot after injuring his thumb. Trafford would be in and out of the starting lineup during his first 2.5 years at Inverness, showing good form when getting a regular run of games. He left the club at the end of the 2019–20 season. He then signed for Hamilton Academical. On 19 May 2021 it was announced that he would leave Hamilton at the end of the season, following the expiry of his contract.

=== Wales ===
Trafford signed with National League side Wrexham on 25 October 2021, signing a short team deal following a successful trial. In January 2022, it was announced that Trafford's contract had expired without making an appearance for the club.

=== Cavalry FC ===
On 17 February 2022, Trafford signed a two-year contract with his hometown club, Canadian Premier League side Cavalry FC, where he joined his cousin Mason.

In January 2024, Trafford extended his contract with Cavalry through the 2025 season, with a club option for 2026. He scored his first goal for the club in May 2024 against Vancouver FC. In March 2025, he announced his retirement.

== International career ==
Trafford received his first call up to the Canada national team on 6 October 2015 as a replacement for Kyle Bekker, who withdrew from the squad due to injury. He earned his first cap seven days later on 13 October, starting in central midfield against Ghana.

== Personal life ==
His cousin Mason Trafford is also a professional soccer player. Both have played for IFK Mariehamn and Cavalry FC. In November 2023 he started an urban farming business with his sister Sya.

Trafford is a part-owner of Northern Super League club Calgary Wild.

== Career statistics ==
As of 13 February 2025

Appearances and goals by club, season and competition
Club	Season	League			National Cup		League Cup		Other		Total	
Club	Season	Division	Apps	Goals	Apps	Goals	Apps	Goals	Apps	Goals	Apps	Goals
Mariehamn	2013	Veikkausliiga	7	2	0	0	0	0	0	0	7	2
TPS	2014	Veikkausliiga	5	0	1	0	3	0	0	0	9	0
KuPS	2014	Veikkausliiga	21	3	—		—		0	0	21	3
KuPS	2015	Veikkausliiga	28	5	3	0	4	1	0	0	35	6
KuPS	Total		49	8	3	0	4	1	0	0	56	9
Korona Kielce	2015–16	Ekstraklasa	3	0	0	0	—		—		3	0
Korona Kielce	2016–17	Ekstraklasa	0	0	1	0	—		—		1	0
Korona Kielce	Total		3	0	1	0	0	0	0	0	4	0
Korona Kielce II	2015–16	III liga, gr. G	6	0	—		—		—		6	0
Korona Kielce II	2016–17	IV liga Holy Cross	8	2	—		—		—		8	2
Korona Kielce II	Total		14	2	0	0	0	0	0	0	14	2
Sandecja Nowy Sącz	2016–17	I liga	8	0	—		—		—		8	0
RoPS	2017	Veikkausliiga	6	1	0	0	0	0	0	0	6	1
Inverness Caledonian Thistle	2017–18	Scottish Championship	26	0	1	0	0	0	1 (Note: Appearance in the Scottish Challenge Cup)	0	28	0
Inverness Caledonian Thistle	2018–19	Scottish Championship	24	1	6	0	3	0	5	1	38	2
Inverness Caledonian Thistle	2019–20	Scottish Championship	20	0	3	1	3	0	4	1	30	2
Inverness Caledonian Thistle	Total		70	1	10	1	6	0	10	2	96	4
Hamilton Academical	2020–21	Scottish Premiership	17 (Note: Includes appearance on 1 May 2021, v St Mirren not recorded on Soccerbase or Soccerway:)	0	0	0	1	1	0	0	18	1
Cavalry FC	2022	Canadian Premier League	23	0	2	0	0	0	1	0	26	0
Cavalry FC	2023	Canadian Premier League	25	0	1	0	0	0	3	0	29	0
Cavalry FC	2024	Canadian Premier League	20	1	3	0	0	0	4	0	27	1
Cavalry FC	2025	Canadian Premier League	0	0	0	0	0	0	2	1	2	1
Cavalry FC	Total		68	1	6	0	0	0	10	1	84	2
Career total			247	15	21	1	14	2	20	3	302	21

== Honours ==
Sandecja Nowy Sącz

- I liga: 2016–17
