= Hamza Elias =

Ghanaian association football midfielder

Personal information
- Date of birth: May 5, 1993 (age 33)
- Place of birth: Accra, Ghana
- Height: 5 ft 8 in (1.73 m)
- Position: Midfielder

Senior career*
Years	Team	Apps	(Gls)
2009–2012	Medeama SC		
2012–2013	FC Platini Kumasi		
2014	Ottawa Fury	4	(0)
2018–	Club Atletico Saint Louis		

International career^{‡}
2007	Ghana U17		
- * Club domestic league appearances and goals as of 11 July 2014 ‡ National team caps and goals as of 15 January 2014

Hamza Elias (born 5 May 1993) is a Ghanaian association football midfielder.

== Club career ==
Between 2009 and 2012, Elias played for Kessben F.C., later renamed Medeama SC, of the Ghana Premier League, the top division of professional football in Ghana, before playing one season in the second division with FC Platini Kumasi for the 2012–2013 season.

On 15 January 2014, it was announced that Elias had signed a 1-year contract with Canadian club Ottawa Fury FC of the North American Soccer League after being discovered by scouts at a combine also attended by scouts from Monaco, Braga, and Porto. The Fury released Elias on July 9, 2014. Elias appeared in only four matches for the Ottawa club and accumulated three yellow cards.

Since 2018, Elias has played for National Premier Soccer League side Club Atletico Saint Louis.

== International career ==
In 2007, Elias was called up to the Ghana national under-17 football team.
