= Richard Luca =

Brazilian footballer (born 1998)

Personal information
- Full name: Richard Luca Rosa da Silva Sousa
- Date of birth: 6 January 1998 (age 28)
- Place of birth: Aparecida de Goiânia, Brazil
- Height: 1.62 m (5 ft 4 in)
- Position: Forward

Team information
- Current team: Mosta
- Number: 7

Youth career
- 2013–2016: Goiás
- 2016–2018: Santos

Senior career*
Years	Team	Apps	(Gls)
2016	Goiás	1	(0)
2018–2020	Tigres UANL	0	(0)
2018	→ Correcaminos (loan)	10	(0)
2019	→ Torpedo Kutaisi (loan)	13	(3)
2020	→ Aparecidense (loan)	0	(0)
2020–2021	Cavalry FC	18	(1)
2022	Tepatitlán	6	(0)
2023	Caxias	1	(0)
2024	Goianésia	3	(0)
2024	ABECAT		
2024–	Mosta	7	(1)

International career
2013	Brazil U15	14	(2)
- * Club domestic league appearances and goals as of 16 October 2024

Richard Luca Rosa da Silva Sousa (born 6 January 1998), known as Richard Luca or simply Richard, is a Brazilian professional footballer who plays as Forward for Maltese side Mosta.

== Club career ==
=== Goiás ===
In 2013, Richard Luca played for Goiás' U-15 side, where he scored 27 goals in 22 appearances. On 12 March 2016, he made his senior debut for Goiás as a 60th-minute substitute in a Campeonato Goiano match against Atlético Goianiense.

=== Santos ===
On 20 September 2016, Richard Luca signed a three-year contract with Brazilian giants Santos. While at Santos, he played in the Copa São Paulo de Futebol Júnior and was scouted by FC Barcelona.

=== Tigres UANL ===
On 13 April 2018, Richard Luca signed with Liga MX side Tigres UANL.

==== Correcaminos ====
On 11 June 2018, Richard Luca was loaned to Ascenso MX side Correcaminos. He made ten league appearances in the Apertura that season, before returning to Tigres in November 2018.

==== Torpedo Kutaisi ====
In early 2019, Richard Luca was loaned to Georgian Erovnuli Liga side Torpedo Kutaisi. He made thirteen league appearances that season, scoring three goals, and scored a brace in one Georgian Cup appearance.

==== Aparecidense ====
On 2 December 2019, after turning down offers from Europe, Richard Luca was loaned to his hometown club, Aparecidense, so that he could be closer to his family.

=== Cavalry FC ===
On 19 February 2020, Richard Luca signed for Canadian Premier League side Cavalry FC, but was unable to join the team that season due to the COVID-19 pandemic. On 4 December 2020, he re-signed to a multi-year contract. After the 2021 season, Cavalry announced that Luca would leave the club after two seasons.

== International career ==
In 2013, Richard Luca played for the Brazilian U15 team, scoring two goals in fourteen appearances.

== Personal life ==
Richard Luca grew up in the Vale do Sol area of Aparecida de Goiânia, Goiás State.

== Career statistics ==
As of 16 November 2021

Club statistics
Club	Season	League			National Cup (Note: Includes appearances in the Georgian Cup.)		Other (Note: Includes appearances in the Campeonato Goiano.)		Total	
Club	Season	Division	Apps	Goals	Apps	Goals	Apps	Goals	Apps	Goals
Goiás	2016	Série B	0	0	—		1	0	1	0
Correcaminos	2018–19	Ascenso MX	10	0	0	0	0	0	10	0
Torpedo Kutaisi	2019	Erovnuli Liga	13	3	1	2	0	0	14	5
Cavalry FC	2021	CPL	18	1	0	0	0	0	18	1
Career total			41	4	1	2	1	0	43	6
