= Julian Roloff =

German footballer (born 2001)

Personal information
- Date of birth: 17 January 2001 (age 25)
- Place of birth: Grevenbroich, Germany
- Height: 1.92 m (6 ft 4 in)
- Position: Goalkeeper

Youth career
- Bayer Leverkusen
- 2016–2018: Viktoria Köln
- 2018–2019: 1. FC Köln

Senior career*
| Years | Team | Apps | (Gls) |
| 2019–2022 | 1. FC Köln II | 24 | (0) |
| 2022 | Cavalry FC | 4 | (0) |
| 2023 | 1. FC Köln II | 13 | (0) |
- * Club domestic league appearances and goals

Julian Roloff (born 17 January 2001) is a German former footballer who played as a goalkeeper.

== Early life ==
Roloff played youth football with Bayer Leverkusen and Viktoria Köln. In 2018, he moved to the 1. FC Köln youth system.

== Career ==
On 27 April 2019, Roloff debuted with 1. FC Köln II in the fourth tier Regionalliga West against SC Wiedenbrück. In January 2021, he extended his contract, and then he extended it again in January 2022. He terminated his contract with Köln in February 2022 in order to sign with a new club.

In March 2022, he signed with Canadian Premier League club Cavalry FC. He had initially had discussions about joining the club the previous year in 2021, but declined as he had just become the first-choice keeper with Köln II. He made his debut for Cavalry on April 9 against Atlético Ottawa.

In January 2023, he returned to training with his former club 1. FC Köln, with the first team squad. On 15 January, it was announced that Roloff would officially join Köln, with Cavalry retaining a percentage of any future transfer. He was expected to train with the first team as the fourth goalkeeper, while getting some game time with the second team in the Regionalliga.

At the end of the 2022–23 season, he retired from playing football professionally to focus on his studies.

== Career statistics ==
Appearances and goals by club, season and competition
| Club | Season | League | | | Playoffs | | National cup | | Total | |
| Club | Season | Division | Apps | Goals | Apps | Goals | Apps | Goals | Apps | Goals |
|---|---|---|---|---|---|---|---|---|---|---|
| 1. FC Köln II | 2018–19 | Regionalliga West | 2 | 0 | – | | – | | 2 | 0 |
| 1. FC Köln II | 2019–20 | Regionalliga West | 2 | 0 | – | | – | | 2 | 0 |
| 1. FC Köln II | 2020–21 | Regionalliga West | 3 | 0 | – | | – | | 3 | 0 |
| 1. FC Köln II | 2021–22 | Regionalliga West | 17 | 0 | – | | – | | 17 | 0 |
| 1. FC Köln II | Total | | 24 | 0 | 0 | 0 | 0 | 0 | 24 | 0 |
| Cavalry FC | 2022 | Canadian Premier League | 4 | 0 | 0 | 0 | 0 | 0 | 4 | 0 |
| 1. FC Köln II | 2022–23 | Regionalliga West | 13 | 0 | – | | – | | 13 | 0 |
| Career total | | | 41 | 0 | 0 | 0 | 0 | 0 | 41 | 0 |
