= Oliver Minatel =

Brazilian footballer

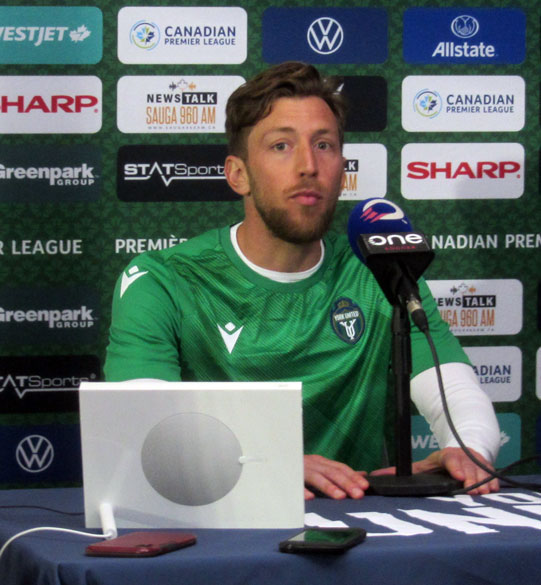

Personal information
- Full name: Oliver Thomal Minatel
- Date of birth: 29 August 1992 (age 34)
- Place of birth: Campinas, Brazil
- Height: 1.78 m (5 ft 10 in)
- Position: Forward

Youth career
- 2002–2007: Guarani
- 2007–2009: Paulínia
- 2009–2010: PSV
- 2010–2011: Nacional

Senior career*
Years	Team	Apps	(Gls)
2011–2013	Nacional	11	(0)
2013	Velo Clube	11	(1)
2014–2015	Ottawa Fury	44	(9)
2015	→ Ottawa Fury Academy	1	(0)
2016	Puerto Rico FC	9	(1)
2017	Richmond Kickers	15	(2)
2018	South Melbourne	18	(7)
2019–2021	Cavalry FC	31	(7)
2022	York United	6	(1)
- * Club domestic league appearances and goals as of 10 October 2022

Oliver Thomal Minatel (born 29 August 1992), known as Oliver, is a Brazilian former professional footballer. He currently serves as a scouting coordinator with Orlando City SC in Major League Soccer.

== Career ==
=== Youth ===
After spending five years at his home club Guarani, Mintatel joined the esteemed academy of Paulínia in 2007 where he would play three seasons in the Campeonato Paulista and featured in the Copa São Paulo.

At Nacional, Minatel spent one year with their U-19 squad where he finished second on the team in scoring with 18 goals from 22 matches. Minatel made the move to Nacional after spending a year with the U-19 side of Dutch side PSV Eindhoven. PSV discovered Minatel while scouting players in the Copa São Paulo, the biggest U-19 National Tournament in the world.

=== Nacional ===
Minatel spent three seasons with Portuguese side C.D. Nacional that included two years in the Primeira Liga. Minatel became the youngest player in Nacional club history to start in an international match when he featured in their UEFA Europa League qualifier against Icelandic side Fimleikafélag Hafnarfjarðar at 18 years of age.

=== Velo Clube ===
Minatel moved back to his native Brazil to Velo Clube, where he spent the majority of 2013, before signing with NASL club Ottawa Fury on November 14, 2013.

=== Ottawa Fury ===
Oliver would go on to be the club's leading scorer in 2014, scoring 7 goals in 22 league appearances. On 19 January 2015, he was re-signed by Ottawa for an additional year.

In April 2015, Oliver made international news after being attacked by a fellow passenger while on an Air Canada flight from Toronto to Atlanta with his team for an away match against the Atlanta Silverbacks. He was uninjured and the perpetrator was taken into the custody of the FBI and local law enforcement in Atlanta. The unprovoked attacker had attempted to choke Oliver with a headphone cord from the seat behind, but was separated from him by Minatel's teammates and other passengers.

Oliver finished the 2015 season with 3 goals in 25 appearances in all competitions. In December 2015, he was officially released by the club.

=== Puerto Rico FC ===
On March 10, 2016, Oliver was signed by NASL expansion team Puerto Rico FC.

=== South Melbourne ===
On February 13, 2018, Oliver joined the South Melbourne FC for the 2018 season. Throughout the later stages of the season, Oliver was utilised in a defensive midfield role in which he excelled despite playing out of position. He was pivotal in South Melbourne's survival against relegation.

=== Cavalry FC ===
Oliver returned to Canada in 2019, joining Cavalry FC ahead of the inaugural Canadian Premier League season. Oliver was Cavalry FC's first-ever non-Canadian signing. He cited the quality of life in Canada as a factor in his decision to return. He scored 8 goals in his first season with Cavalry as the team came very close to winning the championship. In December 2019, Cavalry announced Minatel would return to the club for the 2020 season. Unfortunately, he fractured both his tibia and his fibula in a match against York9, ending his season. He returned for the 2021 season, but was sidelined for most of the season due to his injury, only managing to appear in 3 matches at the end of the year. He departed the club following the 2021 season.

=== York United ===
Minatel remained signed with York United FC ahead of the 2022 Canadian Premier League season.

After a number of injuries that limited his time with both Cavalry and York United, on October 11, 2022, Minatel announced his retirement from the professional game.

== After retirement ==
Shortly after putting an end to his playing career, on February 8, 2023, Minatel was officially announced as the new Head of Recruitment and Player Development by his former club Cavalry FC.

In the summer of 2024, he joined Major League Soccer club Orlando City SC as a scouting coordinator.

== Career statistics ==
As of 16 November 2021.

Club statistics
Club	Season	League			National Cup (Note: Includes appearances and goals in the Taça de Portugal, Canadian Championship, Copa Luis Villarejo and U.S. Open Cup.)		League Cup (Note: Includes appearances and goals in the Taça da Liga.)		Continental (Note: Includes appearances and goals in the UEFA Europa League.)		Other (Note: Includes appearances and goals in the Soccer Bowl and Canadian Premier League Finals.)		Total	
Club	Season	Division	Apps	Goals	Apps	Goals	Apps	Goals	Apps	Goals	Apps	Goals	Apps	Goals
Nacional	2011–12	Primeira Liga	10	0	3	0	2	0	3	0	0	0	18	0
Nacional	2012–13	Primeira Liga	1	0	0	0	0	0	—		0	0	1	0
Nacional	Total		11	0	3	0	2	0	3	0	0	0	19	0
Velo Clube	2013	Paulista Série A2	11	1	0	0	—		—		0	0	11	1
Ottawa Fury	2014	NASL	22	7	2	0	—		—		0	0	24	7
Ottawa Fury	2015	NASL	22	2	1	1	—		—		2	0	25	3
Ottawa Fury	Total		44	9	3	1	0	0	0	0	2	0	49	10
Ottawa Fury FC Academy	2016	Première Ligue de soccer du Québec	1	0	—		0	0	—		—		1	0
Puerto Rico FC	2016	NASL	9	1	5	2	—		—		0	0	14	3
Richmond Kickers	2017	United Soccer League	15	2	1	0	—		—		0	0	16	2
South Melbourne	2018	NPL Victoria	18	7	0	0	—		—		0	0	18	7
Cavalry FC	2019	Canadian Premier League	22	7	5	1	—		—		2	0	29	8
Cavalry FC	2020	Canadian Premier League	7	0	0	0	—		—		0	0	7	0
Cavalry FC	2021	Canadian Premier League	2	0	0	0	—		—		1	0	3	0
Cavalry FC	Total		31	7	5	1	0	0	0	0	3	0	39	8
Career total			140	27	17	4	2	0	3	0	5	0	167	31

== Honours ==
=== Club ===
Cavalry FC

- Canadian Premier League Finals
  - Runners-up: 2019
- Canadian Premier League (Regular season):
  - Champions: Spring 2019, Fall 2019
