= Ahinga Selemani =

American soccer player (born 1996)

Personal information
- Full name: Ahinga Bienvenu Selemani
- Date of birth: March 15, 1996 (age 30)
- Place of birth: Moncton, New Brunswick, Canada
- Height: 1.75 m (5 ft 9 in)
- Position: Forward

Youth career
- Windsor Internationals
- Michigan Tigers FC
- 2009–2014: Michigan CSA Wolves

College career
Years	Team	Apps	(Gls)
2014	Michigan Wolverines	18	(3)
2015–2016	UC Santa Barbara Gauchos	43	(12)

Senior career*
Years	Team	Apps	(Gls)
2015	AFC Ann Arbor		
2016	Ventura County Fusion	1	(0)
2017	Panetolikos	0	(0)
2018–2019	Vlašim	15	(2)
2018–2019	Vlašim B		
2019–2020	Hawke's Bay United	16	(10)
2020	Lincoln Red Imps		
2021	Cavalry FC	17	(3)
2022	Gudja United	20	(4)
2023	One Knoxville SC	15	(0)
2023	Valour FC	10	(0)
2024–2025	Mġarr United	1	(0)
2025	Laredo Heat		
2025	Ponce FC		

International career^{‡}
2012–2013	United States U17	4+	(2+)
2013–2014	United States U18		
- * Club domestic league appearances and goals as of September 29, 2025 ‡ National team caps and goals as of December 31, 2014

Ahinga Bienvenu Selemani (born March 15, 1996) is a former professional soccer player. Born in Canada, he represented the United States at youth international level.

== Early life ==
Selemani was born in Moncton, New Brunswick, Canada, later moving to Windsor, Ontario as a child, before moving to the United States and being raised in Ann Arbor, Michigan. He began playing youth soccer in Canada with Windsor Internationals. From 2009 to 2014, he played with the Michigan CSA Wolves. He attended Pioneer High School in Ann Arbor, where he won the district championship with the soccer team in 2011 and was named to the All-State team.

== College career ==
In February 2014, he committed to attend the University of Michigan, where he played for the men's soccer team. He made his collegiate debut on August 29 against the FIU Panthers. He scored his first goal on October 26 against the Indiana Hoosiers. At the end of the season, he was named to the Big Ten Conference All-Freshman Team.

In 2015, he transferred to the University of California, Santa Barbara to play for their soccer team. He scored his first goal on September 6, 2015, against the On November 11, he scored against the UC Davis Aggies, to propel the team to the Big West Tournament final. At the end of the season, he was named to the All-Big West Conference Second Team. On October 10, 2016, he earned Big West Offensive Player of the Week honors. The following week, he was again named the Big West Offensive Player of the Week and was also named to the College Soccer News Team of the Week. At the end of the season, he was named to the All-Big West First Team. He chose to not return for his senior season in 2017 to instead pursue a professional career.

== Club career ==
In 2015, he played in the Premier Development League with AFC Ann Arbor in the Great Lakes Premier League.

In 2016, he played with the Ventura County Fusion in the Premier Development League.

In February 2017, Selemani went on trial with Super League Greece side Panetolikos. He subsequently signed a three-year contract with the club. In August 2017, he mutually terminated his contract, without having appeared in an official match, electing to return to North America.

In July 2018, Selemani signed with second tier Czech National Football League side Vlašim. He also spent some time with their B team in the sixth tier I.A Class, including scoring a hat trick May 20, 2019 against Úvaly.

In October 2019, Selemani signed with New Zealand Football Championship side Hawke's Bay United. He scored 10 goals and added 6 assists in 16 games that season, winning the Hawke's Bay's player of the season award. He was also a runner-up in the league MVP race and was the team's Player's choice player of the year and Coach's choice player of the year.

In July 2020, he joined Gibraltar National League team Lincoln Red Imps.

In December 2020, he signed with Canadian Premier League club Cavalry FC for the 2021 season. He scored his first goals for the club on June 30, netting a brace in a 4–1 victory over Atlético Ottawa.

In January 2022, he signed a short-term deal with Gudja United in the Maltese Premier League.

In late December 2022, he joined USL League One side One Knoxville SC, ahead of the 2023 season.

In July 2023, Selemani returned to the Canadian Premier League, signing with Valour FC. He made his debut on July 23, in a substitute appearance against York United FC.

In November 2024, he signed with Mġarr United in the Maltese Challenge League.

In the summer of 2025, he joined Laredo Heat SC in USL League Two, before joining Ponce FC in the Liga Puerto Rico Pro for the remainder of 2025. He then retired from the sport at the end of 2025, transitioning to the role of Director of Recruitment & Player Placement with Laredo Heat SC.

== International career ==
Selemani was born in Canada to parents from the DR Congo, and moved to the United States at a young age, and is eligible for all three national teams. In 2012, he began playing with the United States U17 as a member of their residency program. On November 28, 2012, he scored in a friendly against Brazil U17. He was named to the squad for the 2013 CONCACAF U-17 Championship, scoring a goal against Haiti U17. In 2013 and 2014, he was selected to the United States U18 for various tournaments. He also spent some time with the United States U20.

== Career statistics ==
As of August 6, 2023

Club statistics
Club	Season	League			Playoffs		National Cup (Note: Includes appearances in the Czech Cup, Canadian Championship and Maltese FA Trophy.)		Total	
Club	Season	Division	Apps	Goals	Apps	Goals	Apps	Goals	Apps	Goals
Ventura County Fusion	2016	Premier Development League	1	0	—		0	0	1	0
Panetolikos	2017–18	Super League Greece	0	0	—		0	0	0	0
Vlašim	2018–19	Czech National Football League	15	2	—		1	0	16	2
Hawke's Bay United	2019–20	New Zealand Premiership	16	10	—		—		16	10
Lincoln Red Imps	2020–21	Gibraltar National League	?	?	—		?	?	?	?
Cavalry FC	2021	Canadian Premier League	17	3	0	0	1	0	18	3
Gudja United	2021–22	Maltese Premier League	10	3	—		2	1	12	4
Gudja United	2022–23	Maltese Premier League	11	1	—		0	0	11	1
Gudja United	Total		20	4	2	1	1	0	23	5
One Knoxville SC	2023	USL League One	15	0	0	0	0	0	15	0
Valour FC	2023	Canadian Premier League	3	0	—		0	0	3	0
Career total			87	19	0	0	4	1	92	20
