= Andrés Fresenga =

Canadian soccer player (born 1992)

Personal information
- Full name: Andrés Matías Fresenga Cúneo
- Date of birth: 13 October 1992 (age 34)
- Place of birth: Toronto, Ontario, Canada
- Height: 1.80 m (5 ft 11 in)
- Position: Right back

Youth career
- 1996–2007: Toronto Argentina
- 2007–2008: Nacional
- 2008–2009: Danubio
- 2009–2010: Racing Club

Senior career*
Years	Team	Apps	(Gls)
2010–2013	Racing Club	7	(0)
2014	Ottawa Fury	8	(0)
2015	Woodbridge Strikers		
2015	Toronto Croatia		
2016–2017	Canadian	9	(0)
2017–	Cerro Largo	8	(0)
2017	→ Suchitepéquez (loan)	18	(2)

International career
2011	Canada U20	2	(0)
2012	Canada U23	2	(0)
- * Club domestic league appearances and goals as of 18 February 2018

Andrés Matías Fresenga Cúneo (born 13 October 1992) is a Canadian professional soccer player who last played as a defender for Cerro Largo.

== Club career ==
=== Youth ===
Fresenga started playing soccer for local team Toronto Argentina at age 4 before moving to his parents' native Uruguay in 2007 and joining Club Nacional de Futbol and helping them win the Uruguayan U16 Championship his first year. Fresenga moved to a new club each year for the following two seasons, including a year with Danubio FC during which he won the Uruguayan U17 Championship in 2008 and a year with the U23 squad of Racing Club de Montevideo.

=== Racing Club ===
After one season, he joined Racing Club's First Division squad in 2010, playing through the 2013 season. In January 2013, Fresenga trialed with Vancouver Whitecaps FC of Major League Soccer in his native Canada during the club's preseason as a potential successor to Young-Pyo Lee following his imminent retirement. The club made contact with Canadian Soccer Association technical director Tony Fonseca about the player's availability after his impressive displays during 2012 Olympic qualifying. However, he was ultimately not signed by the club because of an injury and was eventually left without a club.

=== Ottawa Fury ===
On 10 January 2014, it was announced that Fresenga had joined Ottawa Fury FC of the North American Soccer League on a one-year deal. The deal came about because Martin Nash, long time Whitecaps player and staff member, recommended the player to Ottawa as they assembled a roster for the club's inaugural season in the NASL following Fresenga's trial with Vancouver. Fresenga made his league debut for Ottawa on 19 April 2014 against Minnesota United FC. He came on as a substitute for Omar Jarun and played the final twelve minutes of the 1–2 defeat.

=== Woodbridge Strikers ===
On 12 April 2015, Fresenga signed with the Woodbridge Strikers in League1 Ontario. The club went on to win the League1 Cup and finish runners-up in league play.

=== Toronto Croatia ===
For the remainder of the season he played in the Canadian Soccer League with Toronto Croatia. Where he won the CSL Championship after defeating SC Waterloo by a score of 1–0.

=== Canadian ===
In 2016, Fresenga returned to Uruguay and signed with Uruguayan Segunda División club Canadian S.C.

=== Cerro Largo ===
In 2017, Fresenga signed with Cerro Largo. He made his debut on 4 June 2017 against Cerrito.

==== Loan to Suchitepéquez ====
In June 2017, Fresenga joined Guatemalan Liga Nacional side Suchitepéquez on loan.

== International career ==
Fresenga is eligible to represent either Canada or Uruguay internationally.

Fresenga made his international debut for Canada as part of the youth squad which competed at the 2011 CONCACAF U-20 Championship in Guatemala. He was also part of the squad that finished 4th during the 2012 CONCACAF Men's Olympic Qualifying Tournament.

Fresenga was invited to the final training camp of 2013 and first training camp of 2014 for the Canada national team in the United States and Spain respectively. On June 6, 2017, Fresenga was named to Canada's 40-man provisional squad for the 2017 CONCACAF Gold Cup.

== Personal life ==
Fresenga was born in Toronto, Ontario to Uruguayan parents from Pando in the Canelones Department.

== Honours ==
Toronto Croatia

CSL Championship: 2015
