= Nicolas Apostol =

Canadian soccer player (born 1999)

Personal information
- Full name: Nicolas Gabriel Apostol
- Date of birth: January 1, 1999 (age 27)
- Place of birth: Surrey, British Columbia, Canada
- Height: 1.75 m (5 ft 9 in)
- Position: Defender

Team information
- Current team: TSS FC Rovers
- Number: 14

Youth career
- 2006–2011: Guildford AC
- 2008–2017: Vancouver Whitecaps FC
- 2021: Vancouver Whitecaps FC

College career
Years	Team	Apps	(Gls)
2017	Connecticut Huskies	18	(2)

Senior career*
Years	Team	Apps	(Gls)
2016–2017	Whitecaps FC 2	2	(0)
2019–2020	Agrotikos Asteras		
2021	Cavalry FC	7	(0)
2023–2024	Anagennisi Epanomi		
2024	Burnaby FC	8	(0)
2025–	TSS FC Rovers	11	(0)

International career^{‡}
2017	Canada U18	2	(0)
- * Club domestic league appearances and goals as of July 25, 2025 ‡ National team caps and goals as of September 18, 2021

Nicolas Gabriel Apostol (born January 1, 1999) is a Canadian soccer player who plays for TSS FC Rovers in League1 British Columbia.

== Early life and college ==
Apostol began playing youth soccer with the Guildford Athletic Club in Surrey, playing with them from 2006 through 2011. From 2008 to 2011, he was a member of Whitecaps FC Prospects program, while still playing youth club soccer with Guildford, and in September 2011, he officially joined the Whitecaps FC Residency Program.

In 2017, he began attending the University of Connecticut, playing for the men's soccer team, scoring two goals in 18 games as a rookie. The following year, he departed UConn to attend Oregon State University.

In 2021, he joined the Vancouver Whitecaps FC U-23.

== Club career ==
In 2016, while with the Whitecaps Academy, he was called up to the second team Whitecaps FC 2 of the USL, making his debut on July 16, against San Antonio FC. The following year in 2017, he was called up again playing on May 28 against the Real Monarchs earning his first professional assist on Terran Campbell's goal.

In September 2019, he signed with in the Greek Gamma Ethniki with Agrotikos Asteras.

On August 31, 2021, he signed with Cavalry FC of the Canadian Premier League. He made his debut the next day, coming on as a substitute against FC Edmonton. After the 2021 season, Cavalry announced that Apostol would leave the club after one season.

In August 2023, he returned to the Greek Gamma Ethniki, signing with Anagennisi Epanomi. After dealing with injuries, he made his debut in the EPSM Cup on December 6 against Achilleas Triandrias. In January 2024, he departed the club, after having made two appearances.

In 2024, he joined Burnaby FC in League1 British Columbia. In 2025, he joined the TSS FC Rovers.

== International career ==
In 2011, he represented Western Canada at the Danone Nations Cup.

In 2013, he earned his first call up to a youth national team camp with the U15 squad. In 2016, he played in a youth friendly against the United States, for his first international game.
