= 2018 Penn FC season =

Penn FC
2018 season
- Owner: Eric Pettis
- Head coach: Raoul Voss
- Stadium: FNB Field
- USL: 13th
- USL Playoffs: Did not qualifty
- U.S. Open Cup: Third round
- Top goalscorer: Lucky Mkosana (11)
- Highest home attendance: 4,507 (Jun. 9 vs. Toronto)
- Lowest home attendance: 852 (May 7 vs. Ottawa)
- Average home league attendance: 2,147
Home colors	Away colors

The 2018 season was Penn FC's 15th season of competitive soccer, its second in the second division of American soccer, and its eighth and final season in the United Soccer League, now known as the USL Championship. This was the first season the club operated under the "Penn FC" name, having re-branded from the Harrisburg City Islanders in November 2017.

In October 2018, the club announced that it would not play in the USL's top flight beyond that season. Penn FC will suspend professional operations for the 2019 season and resume play in 2020 as a member of USL League One, a third-level league to be launched in 2019 by the USL parent organization.

== Roster ==
As of 23 March 2018

No.	Position	Nation	Player
1	GK	FRA	Romuald Peiser
4	DF	USA	Ken Tribbett
5	DF	BRA	Tiago Calvano
6	DF	USA	Kyle Venter
8	MF	USA	Dan Metzger
9	FW	USA	Aaron Dennis
11	MF	PUR	Jorge Rivera
12	DF	POR	Pedro Galvão
13	GK	USA	Sean Lewis
15	MF	USA	Miguel Jaime
16	DF	USA	Jake Bond
17	MF	USA	Salvatore Barone
18	GK	USA	Jacob Lissek
19	DF	USA	Chris Hill
20	MF	CAN	Mauro Eustáquio
21	MF	USA	Calvin Rezende
22	MF	USA	John Grosh
33	FW	USA	Fabio De Sousa
37	DF	ENG	Harri Hawkins
76	MF	ESA	Richard Menjivar
77	FW	ZIM	Lucky Mkosana
—	DF	USA	Marco Franco
—	MF	USA	Saalih Muhammad

== Transfers ==
=== In ===
Date	Player	Number	Position	Previous club	Fee/notes
February 8, 2018	(Puerto Rico) Jorge Rivera	11	MF	Puerto Rico FC	Undisclosed
February 13, 2018	(United States) Dan Metzger	8	MF	(United States) New York Red Bulls II	Undisclosed
February 14, 2018	(United States) Calvin Rezende	21	MF	(United States) Miami FC	Undisclosed
February 15, 2018	(United States) Jacob Lissek	18	GK	(United States) OKC Energy FC	Undisclosed
February 20, 2018	(United States) Aaron Dennis	9	FW	(United States) Miami FC	Undisclosed
February 23, 2018	(Portugal) Pedro Galvão	12	MF	(Canada) FC Edmonton	Undisclosed
February 23, 2018	(Canada) Mauro Eustáquio	20	MF	(Canada) FC Edmonton	Undisclosed
February 27, 2018	(United States) Kyle Venter	6	DF	(Canada) Ottawa Fury FC	Undisclosed
February 27, 2018	(United States) Marco Franco		DF	(United States) Indy Eleven	Undisclosed
February 28, 2018	(United States) Salvatore Barone	17	MF	(United States) New York Cosmos	Undisclosed
February 28, 2018	(United States) Miguel Jaime	15	MF	(United States) Ocean City Nor'easters	Undisclosed
February 28, 2018	(England) Harri Hawkins	22	DF	(United States) New York Cosmos	Undisclosed
March 2, 2018	(United States) Ken Tribbett	4	DF	(United States) Philadelphia Union	Signed
March 6, 2018	(France) Romuald Peiser	1	GK	(United States) San Francisco Deltas	Signed
March 9, 2018	(United States) Fabio De Sousa	33	FW	(United States) New York Red Bulls U-23	Signed
March 15, 2018	(United States) Saalih Muhammad	99	MF	(United States) San Francisco Deltas	Signed
March 19, 2018	(El Salvador) Richard Menjivar	76	MF	(United States) Rayo OKC	Signed
March 21, 2018	(Zimbabwe) Lucky Mkosana	77	MF	(United States) New York Cosmos	Signed
March 29, 2018	(United States) Tommy Heinemann	29	FW	(United States) San Francisco Deltas	Signed
April 18, 2018	(Ghana) Prince Baffoe	24	MF	(Ghana) Inter Allies FC	Season loan
June 19, 2018	(Brazil) Paulo Junior	31	FW	(United States) Indy Eleven	Signed
July 24, 2018	(Honduras) Walter Ramírez	27	MF	Puerto Rico FC	Signed

=== Out ===
Date	Player	Number	Position	New club	Fee/notes
November 29, 2017	(United States) Nick Noble	1	GK		Retired
December 7, 2017	(United States) Shawn McLaws	23	DF	(United States) Oklahoma City Energy FC	Undisclosed
January 4, 2018	(Jamaica) Cardel Benbow	19	MF	(Jamaica) Waterhouse FC	Undisclosed
January 16, 2018	(Ghana) Ropapa Mensah	25	FW	(United States) Nashville SC	Undisclosed
	(Jamaica) Paul Wilson	10	MF	(Jamaica) Cavalier F.C.	Undisclosed
January 22, 2018	(Brazil) Pedro Ribeiro	30	FW	(United States) Fresno FC	Undisclosed
February 1, 2018	(United States) Brandon Miller	33	GK	(United States) Charlotte Independence	Undisclosed
	(Senegal) Mouhamed Dabo	8	MF	(United States) Pittsburgh Riverhounds	Undisclosed
	(United States) Griffin Libhart	2	DF		Released
	(United States) Travis Brent	4	DF		Released
	(Puerto Rico) Manolo Sanchez	7	FW		Released
	(Colombia) Jonny Mendoza	9	FW		Released
	(United States) Aaron Wheeler	11	FW		Released
	(Nigeria) Rasheed Olabiyi	12	MF		Released
	(United States) Mike Olla	13	FW		Released
	(United States) Danny DiPrima	14	MF		Released
	(United States) Lee Nishanian	15	MF		Released
	(United States) Jamie Thomas	17	MF		Released
	(United States) Shawn McLaws	23	DF	(United States) Oklahoma City Energy FC	Released
August 1, 2018	(Ghana) Fredrick Yamoah Opoku	60	FW	(Denmark) HB Køge	End loan

== Competitions ==
=== Preseason ===
February 16 Preseason	Penn FC	2–1	Long Island University	Hummelstown, PA
18:00 EDT	Galvão 40'; Dennis 57'	Report	2'; (yellow card) 39'; (yellow card) 54'	Stadium: Lower Dauphin Middle School

February 21 Preseason	Bethlehem Steel FC	5–2	Penn FC	Wayne, PA
	Jepson 61'; Apodaca 74'; Temple 77', 83'; Aaronson 89'	Report	Muhammad 4'; Dennis 79'	Stadium: YSC Academy

February 24 Preseason	Penn FC	3–1	Binghamton University	Hummelstown, PA
	Barone 30'; Galvão 32'; Rezende 57'		21'; (yellow card) 75'	Stadium: Lower Dauphin Middle School

March 3 Preseason	New York Red Bulls II	2–1	Penn FC	Whippany, NJ
	15'; 81'	Report	Rivera 20' (pen.)	Stadium: RBNY Training Facility

March 10 Preseason	Pittsburgh Riverhounds	3–2	Penn FC	Pittsburgh, PA
	Kerr 11' (pen.); Dabo (yellow card) 23'; Holland 51' (pen.); Vancaeyezeele (yellow card) 61'; Parkes 68'	Report	Rivera 24'; Metzger 90' (pen.)	Stadium: Highmark Stadium

=== USL ===
The 2018 USL season will be contested by 33 teams, 16 of which compete in the league's Eastern Conference. All teams will play a regular season total of 34 matches between teams within their respective conference. At the conclusion of the regular season, the top eight teams from each conference advance to the 2018 USL Playoffs for a chance to compete for the USL Championship Title.

==== Standings (Eastern Conference) ====
Pos	Team	Pld	W	D	L	GF	GA	GD	Pts
11	Charlotte Independence	34	10	12	12	44	57	−13	42
12	Tampa Bay Rowdies	34	11	8	15	44	44	0	41
13	Penn FC	34	9	10	15	38	47	−9	37
14	Atlanta United 2	34	7	10	17	37	72	−35	31
15	Richmond Kickers	34	6	4	24	30	80	−50	22

Source: 2018 USL standings
Rules for classification: 1) total wins; 2) total goal differential; 3) total goals scored; 4) points earned against top four Conference finishers; 5) disciplinary points; 6) coin toss or drawing of lots

==== Results ====
All times in Eastern Time.

March 24 1	Charleston Battery	1–0	Penn FC	Charleston, South Carolina
7:00 PM	Svantesson (yellow card) 39'; Guerra 62'; Anunga (yellow card) 65'; Okonkwo (red card) 88'	PFC Report; USL Report	Tiago (yellow card) 70'	Stadium: MUSC Health Stadium; Attendance: 2,615; Referee: Marcos de Oliveira

March 31 2	Pittsburgh Riverhounds	0–0	Penn FC	Pittsburgh, Pennsylvania
7:00 PM	François (yellow card) 38'	PFC Report; USL Report	Barone (yellow card) 45'; Peiser (yellow card) 90+2'	Stadium: Highmark Stadium; Attendance: 2,006; Referee: Charles Murphy

April 8 3	Atlanta United 2	1–1	Penn FC	Lawrenceville, Georgia
4:00 PM	Gallagher 63'; Shannon (yellow card) 75'	Report	Tribbett (yellow card) 8'; Heinemann 31'; Menjivar (yellow card) 73'	Stadium: Coolray Field; Attendance: 2,861; Referee: Elton Garcia

April 21 4	Penn FC	1–1	Charleston Battery	Harrisburg, Pennsylvania
6:00 PM	Tiago (yellow card) 36'; Opoku (yellow card) 53'; Tribbett (yellow card) 56', (goal) 89'; Bond (yellow card) 65'; Eustáquio (yellow card) 82'	Report	Anunga (yellow card) 39'; Bolt (yellow card) 52'; Guerra 77'	Stadium: FNB Field; Attendance: 1,712; Referee: Guido Gonzalez

April 24 5	Penn FC	0–0	Nashville SC	Harrisburg, Pennsylvania
6:30 PM		Report		Stadium: FNB Field; Attendance: 1,012; Referee: Lorant Varga

April 28 6	North Carolina FC	3–0	Penn FC	Cary, North Carolina
7:00 PM	da Luz 29'; Bekker 35'; Ríos 37'; Kandziora (yellow card) 66'; Miller (yellow card) 75'	Report	Eustáquio (yellow card) 40'; Bond (yellow card) 49'	Stadium: Sahlen's Stadium at WakeMed Soccer Park; Attendance: 3,970; Referee: Jonathan Bilinski

May 4 7	Penn FC	3–0	Tampa Bay Rowdies	Harrisburg, Pennsylvania
7:00 PM	Venter 11'; Heinemann (yellow card) 25', (goal) 57', 60'; Metzger (yellow card) 32'; Peiser (yellow card) 89'	Report	Curinga (yellow card) 15'	Stadium: FNB Field; Attendance: 1,281; Referee: Javier Santos Escobar

May 7 8	Penn FC	0–1	Ottawa Fury	Harrisburg, Pennsylvania
6:30 PM	Calvano (yellow card) 61'; Franco (yellow card) 80'	Report	Edward (yellow card) 83'; Falvey 87'	Stadium: FNB Field; Attendance: 852; Referee: Matthew Franz

May 9 9	Toronto FC II	0–1	Penn FC	Toronto, Ontario
11:00 AM	Johnson (yellow card) 24'; Hundal (red card) 43'; Daniels (yellow card) 45+4'	Report	Rivera (yellow card) 41'; Rezende (yellow card) 45+2'; Miguel Jaime (yellow card) 53', (goal) 87'	Stadium: Monarch Park Stadium; Attendance: 4,100

May 26 10	Pittsburgh Riverhounds SC	0–0	Penn FC	Pittsburgh, Pennsylvania
7:00 PM	Parkes (yellow card) 21'; Brett (yellow card) 90+4'	Report	Metzger (yellow card) 48'	Stadium: Highmark Stadium; Attendance: 2,110; Referee: Ismir Pekmic

June 2 11	Nashville SC	3–1	Penn FC	Nashville, Tennessee
8:30 PM	Allen 36'; Moloto 48'; Winn 81'	Report	Tribbett 76'	Stadium: First Tennessee Park; Attendance: 8,724; Referee: Eric Tattersall

June 9 12	Penn FC	3–2	Toronto FC II	Harrisburg, Pennsylvania
7:00 PM	Metzger (yellow card) 3'; Tribbett 53', 55'; Menjivar (yellow card) 61'; Ortiz 90+7' (pen.)	Report	Akinola 13', (yellow card) 51'; Hamilton (yellow card) 40', (goal) 68'; Onkony (yellow card) 90+1'; Catalano (yellow card) 90+4'	Stadium: FNB Field; Attendance: 4,507; Referee: Thomas Snyder

June 12 13	Penn FC	2–1	Richmond Kickers	Harrisburg, Pennsylvania
7:00 PM	Bond (yellow card) 45'; Osae (yellow card) 52' (goal) 56'; Tiago (yellow card) 62'; Metzger 86'	Report	Worra (yellow card) 52'; Umar (yellow card) 74'; Williams (yellow card) 90+1'; Cordovés 90+4'	Stadium: FNB Field; Attendance: 2,114; Referee: Kevin Broadley

June 16 14	Louisville City FC	3–3	Penn FC	Louisville, Kentucky
7:30 PM	DelPiccolo 9'; Ilić 12', 45+1'	Report	Mkosana 1', 63'; Osae (yellow card) 32'; Baffoe 84'	Stadium: Louisville Slugger Field; Attendance: 7,978; Referee: JJ Bilinsk

June 22 15	Tampa Bay Rowdies	1–2	Penn FC	St. Petersburg, Florida
19:30 EDT (UTC−4)	Taylor 31' (Schäfer), (red card) 51'; Schäfer (yellow card) 39'; Magalhães (yellow card) 48'; Hristov (yellow card) 55'; Cole (yellow card) 85'	Report	Tribbett (yellow card) 27'; Mkosana 49', 67' (Opoku); Franco (yellow card) 88'	Stadium: Al Lang Stadium; Attendance: 5,369; Referee: Mark Allatin
Note: Match rescheduled from June 23 to avoid conflict with the St. Pete Pride Parade.

June 30 16	Indy Eleven	1–1	Penn FC	Indianapolis, Indiana
7:00 PM	Watson (yellow card) 41'; Ouimette (yellow card) 50' (yellow-red card) 76'; McInerney 80'; Rusin (yellow card) 90'	Report	Mkosana 51' (pen.); Metzger (yellow card) 71'	Stadium: Lucas Oil Stadium; Attendance: 10,222; Referee: Greg Dopka

July 6 17	Penn FC	3–2	Bethlehem Steel FC	Harrisburg, Pennsylvania
7:00 PM	Opoku 20'; Mkosana 25'; Osae 55'	Report	Marquez (yellow card) 6'; Herbers 17', 82' (pen.), (yellow card) 68'; Chambers (yellow card) 83'	Stadium: FNB Field; Attendance: 3,103; Referee: Bardhyl Pashaj

July 9 18	Penn FC	1–2	Richmond Kickers	Harrisburg, Pennsylvania
7:00 PM	Franco (yellow card) 38'; Mkosana 77' (pen.); Metzger (yellow card) 87'	Report	Thomsen 32', (yellow card) 59'; Worra (yellow card) 69'; Luiz Fernando 74', (yellow card) 85'	Stadium: FNB Field; Attendance: 2,124; Referee: Nicked Fateh

July 14 19	Ottawa Fury	2–1	Penn FC	Ottawa, Ontario
2:00 PM	Oliveira (yellow card) 64'; Taylor 72'; Dos Santos 81'; Taylor (yellow card) 87'	Report	Tribbett (yellow card) 40'; Tribbett 56'	Stadium: TD Place Stadium; Attendance: 5,315; Referee: David Barrie

July 28 20	Charlotte Independence	1–1	Penn FC	Matthews, North Carolina
7:30 PM	Areman (yellow card) 47'; Herrera 56'; Zayed 64'; Duckett (yellow card) 90+1'	Report	(yellow card) 62' Metzger; 72' Dennis; (yellow card) 90+5' Rezende	Stadium: Matthews Sportsplex; Attendance: 2,159; Referee: Jonathan Bilinski

August 3 21	New York Red Bulls II	2–1	Penn FC	Montclair, New Jersey
7:00 PM EDT	Tinari 19'; Barlow 25'	Match Center	Mkosana 57'	Stadium: MSU Soccer Park; Attendance: 627; Referee: Eric Tattersall

August 12 22	FC Cincinnati	1–0	Penn FC	Cincinnati, Ohio
6:00 EDT	Ledesma 80'	CIN Report; PENN Report	Baffoe (yellow card) 43'; Tribbett (yellow card) 79'; Mkosana (yellow card) 83'	Stadium: Nippert Stadium; Attendance: 24,249; Referee: Mark Allatin

August 18 23	Richmond Kickers	3–2	Penn FC	Richmond, Virginia
7:00 EDT	Spangenberg (yellow card) 24'; Shriver 27' (pen.); Cordovés 30', (yellow card) 45+1'; Lee (yellow card) 54'; Sekyere 80'	Report	Mkosana 24' (pen.); Venter (yellow card) 26'; Ramírez 54' (pen.); Shaibu (yellow card) 85'	Stadium: City Stadium; Attendance: 5,376; Referee: Javier Santos Escobar

August 25 24	Ottawa Fury FC	0–2	Penn FC	Ottawa, Ontario
8:00 PM	Attakora (yellow card) 76'	Report	Bond (yellow card) 20'; Paulo 45'; Dennis (yellow card) 72', (goal) 80'	Stadium: TD Place Stadium; Attendance: 5,270; Referee: Pierre-Luc Lauziere

September 2 25	Bethlehem Steel FC	1–3	Penn FC	Bethlehem, Pennsylvania
3:00 PM	Chambers (yellow card) 5'; Epps 10'; Mahoney (yellow card) 66'; Chiluya (yellow card) 85'	Report	Mkosana (yellow card) 24', (goal) 40'; Dennis 32', (yellow card) 90+1'; Paulo 59'	Stadium: Goodman Stadium; Attendance: 2,643; Referee: Lorant Varga

September 8 26	Penn FC	1–2	Atlanta United 2	Harrisburg, Pennsylvania
7:00 PM EDT	Tribbett 34', (yellow card) 77'; Bond (yellow card) 72'	Report	Sandoval 3'; Kendall-Moullin (yellow card) 31'; Carleton 41'; Bello (yellow card) 53'; Conway (yellow card) 82'; Kann (yellow card) 90'	Stadium: FNB Field; Attendance: 3,105; Referee: Lukasz Szpala

September 12 27	Penn FC	1–0	Indy Eleven	Harrisburg, Pennsylvania
6:30 PM EDT	Tiago (yellow card) 22'; Paulo 57'; Dennis (yellow card) 72'	Report	McInerney (yellow card) 40'; Rusin (yellow card) 87'	Stadium: FNB Field; Attendance: 1,200; Referee: Ismir Pekmic

September 16 28	Penn FC	0–1	North Carolina FC	Harrisburg, Pennsylvania
19:00 EDT	Shaibu (yellow card) 84'	Report	Ríos 11'; Ewolo (yellow card) 90+2'	Stadium: FNB Field; Attendance: 2,205; Referee: Elvis Osmanovic

September 19 29	Penn FC	0–3	Louisville City FC	Harrisburg, Pennsylvania
6:30 PM	Venter (yellow card) 40'	Report	McMahon (yellow card) 24' (yellow-red card) 73'; DelPiccolo 25'; McCabe 28' Spencer 90+1' (pen.)	Stadium: FNB Field; Attendance: 2,095; Referee: Bardhyl Pashaj; Assistant referees: Tyler Wyrostek; Katarzyna Wasiak; Fourth official: Patrick Sudol

September 22 30	Penn FC	1–2	FC Cincinnati	Harrisburg, Pennsylvania
7:00 EDT	Calvano (yellow card) 7'; Paulo 33'; Osae (yellow card) 45+1'	CIN Report; PENN Report	König (yellow card) 7'; Ledesma (yellow card) 32', (goal) 68'; Bone 84'	Stadium: FNB Field; Attendance: 3,117; Referee: Thomas Snyder

September 26 31	Penn FC	0–2	Pittsburgh Riverhounds SC	Harrisburg, Pennsylvania
6:30 PM EDT	Jaime (yellow card) 66'; Franco (yellow card) 84'	Report	Banjo 38'; Roberts (yellow card) 78'; Lubahn 90+3'	Stadium: FNB Field; Attendance: 1,938; Referee: J.J. Bilinski

October 3 32	Penn FC	2–2	Charlotte Independence	Harrisburg, Pennsylvania
6:30 PM EDT	Venter 36'; Mkosana 44'; Calvano (yellow card) 74'; Baffoe (yellow card) 90'	Report	Zayed 17', 28'; Johnson (yellow card) 87'; Kiffe (yellow card) 90'	Stadium: FNB Field; Attendance: 2,013; Referee: Guido Gonzales, Jr.

October 9 33	Penn FC	1–3	New York Red Bulls II	Harrisburg, Pennsylvania
6:30 PM EDT	Jaime 25'; Rezende (yellow card) 40'; De Sousa (yellow card) 83'; Bond (yellow card) 89'	Report	Stroud 32'; Scarlett (yellow card) 58'; White 66'; Aguinaga 88'	Stadium: FNB Field; Attendance: 1,208; Referee: Marcos de Oliveira

October 13 34	Penn FC	0–0	Toronto FC II	Harrisburg, Pennsylvania
7:00 PM	Calvano (yellow card) 37'; De Sousa (yellow card) 41'	Report	Perruzza (yellow card) 37'; Akinola (yellow card) 47'	Stadium: FNB Field; Attendance: 2,909; Referee: Nickrod Fateh

==== Results summary ====
Overall								Home						Away					
Pld	Pts	W	L	T	GF	GA	GD	W	L	T	GF	GA	GD	W	L	T	GF	GA	GD
34	37	9	15	10	38	47	−9	5	8	4	19	24	−5	4	7	6	19	23	−4

Last updated: November 16, 2018
Source: 2018 USL season
Pld = Matches played; Pts = Points; W = Matches won; T = Matches tied; L = Matches lost; GF = Goals for; GA = Goals against; GD = Goal difference

Round	1	2	3	4	5	6	7	8	9	10	11	12	13	14	15	16	17	18	19	20	21	22	23	24	25	26	27	28	29	30	31	32	33	34
Stadium	A	A	A	H	H	A	H	H	A	A	A	H	H	A	A	A	H	H	A	A	A	A	A	A	A	H	H	H	H	H	H	H	H	H
Result	L	D	D	D	D	L	W	L	W	D	L	W	W	D	W	D	W	L	L	D	L	L	L	W	W	L	W	L	L	L	L	D	L	D
Position	12	13	13	13	14	14					13											13												13

Updated to match(es) played on November 17, 2018. Source: 2018 USL season and Current USL Standing
A = Away; H = Home; W = Win; D = Draw; L = Loss

=== U.S. Open Cup ===
May 16, 2018 Second Round	(New Jersey) FC Motown	1–3	Penn FC (Pennsylvania)	Madison, New Jersey
7:00 PM EDT	Duka 54'	Report	Jaime 79'; Baffoe 80'; Galvão 90+1'	Stadium: Ranger Stadium

May 23, 2018 Third Round	(Virginia) Richmond Kickers	3–2	Penn FC (Pennsylvania)	Richmond, Virginia
7:00 PM EDT	Fernando 13', 22'; Cordoves 82'	Report	Rivera 36', 60'	Stadium: City Stadium

== Statistics ==
=== Appearances and goals ===
As of November 17, 2018

No.	Pos	Nat	Player	Total		USL		Playoffs		Open Cup	
No.	Pos	Nat	Player	Apps	Goals	Apps	Goals	Apps	Goals	Apps	Goals
Defenders:
2	DF	(United States) USA	Ken Tribbett	21	6	21	6	0	0	0	0
5	DF	(Brazil) BRA	Tiago Calvano	15	0	15	0	0	0	0	0
6	DF	(United States) USA	Kyle Venter	26	2	24+1	2	0	0	1	0
12	DF	(Portugal) POR	Pedro Galvão	19	1	15+2	0	0	0	2	1
16	DF	(United States) USA	Jake Bond	16	0	14+2	0	0	0	0	0
19	DF	(United States) USA	Chris Hill	1	0	0	0	0	0	1	0
22	DF	(England) ENG	Harri Hawkins	23	0	20+2	0	0	0	1	0
23	DF	(United States) USA	Marco Franco	27	0	25+1	0	0	0	1	0
80	DF	(Ghana) GHA	Haruna Shaibu	11	0	4+5	0	0	0	2	0
Midfielders:
7	MF	(Colombia) COL	Jerry Ortiz	9	1	3+5	1	0	0	1	0
8	MF	(United States) USA	Dan Metzger	23	1	20+3	1	0	0	0	0
11	MF	(Puerto Rico) PUR	Jorge Rivera	9	2	3+5	0	0	0	1	2
14	MF	(Honduras) HON	Richard Menjívar	33	0	30+1	0	0	0	0+2	0
15	MF	(United States) USA	Miguel Jaime	24	3	15+7	2	0	0	2	1
17	MF	(United States) USA	Salvatore Barone	11	0	6+4	0	0	0	1	0
20	MF	(Canada) CAN	Mauro Eustáquio	8	0	5+2	0	0	0	1	0
21	MF	(United States) USA	Calvin Rezende	21	0	13+7	0	0	0	1	0
25	MF	(Ghana) GHA	Issac Osae	17	2	7+8	2	0	0	2	0
26	MF	(Ghana) GHA	Prince Baffoe	21	2	5+14	1	0	0	2	1
27	MF	(Honduras) HON	Walter Ramírez	14	1	11+2	1	0	0	1	0
Forwards:
9	FW	(United States Virgin Islands) VIR	Aaron Dennis	24	3	15+7	3	0	0	1+1	0
29	FW	(United States) USA	Tommy Heinemann	14	4	10+2	3	0	0	2	1
31	FW	(Brazil) BRA	Paulo Junior	18	4	17+1	4	0	0	0	0
33	FW	(United States) USA	Fabio De Sousa	4	0	0+3	0	0	0	1	0
77	FW	(Mozambique) MOZ	Lucky Mkosana	30	11	24+5	11	0	0	0+1	0
99	MF	(United States) USA	Saalih Muhammad	17	0	9+6	0	0	0	1+1	0

Italics indicates player left team midway through season.

=== Goalkeepers ===
==== League Stats ====
As of January 17, 2017

Players included in matchday squads
Nat.	No.	Player	Apps	Starts	Record	GA	GAA	SO	Yellow card	Red card
(United States)	21	Sean Lewis	0	0	0-0-0	0	0.00	0	0	0
(United States)	33	Brandon Miller	0	0	0-0-0	0	0.00	0	0	0
Total					0–0–0	0	0.00	0	0	0

Record: W-L-D

==== U.S. Open Cup Stats ====
As of January 17, 2017

Players included in matchday squads
Nat.	No.	Player	Apps	Starts	Record	GA	GAA	SO	Yellow card	Red card
(United States)	21	Sean Lewis	0	0	0-0-0	0	0.00	0	0	0
(United States)	33	Brandon Miller	0	0	0-0-0	0	0.00	0	0	0
Total					0–0–0	0	0.00	0	0	0

Record: W-L-D

== Honors ==
- Week 3 Team of the Week Bench: D Ken Tribbett
- Week 6 Team of the Week: D Ken Tribbett
- Week 7 Team of the Week Bench: D Sean Lewis
- Week 8 Player of the Week: F Tommy Heinemann
- Week 11 Team of the Week: G Romuald Peiser
- Week 13 Team of the Week: D Ken Tribbett
- Week 14 Team of the Week Bench: F Lucky Mkosana
- Week 15 Team of the Week: F Lucky Mkosana
- Week 17 Team of the Week: F Lucky Mkosana
- Week 25 Team of the Week Bench: F Aaron Dennis
- Week 27 Team of the Week Bench: D Kyle Venter
- Week 30 Team of the Week Bench: M Richard Menjívar
