= 2016 Miami FC season =

Miami FC
2016 season
- Co-Owner: Paolo Maldini, Riccardo Silva
- Head coach: Alessandro Nesta
- Stadium: FIU Stadium
- NASL: Spring: 11th Fall: 5th Combined: 7th
- U.S. Open Cup: Third Round vs Wilmington Hammerheads
- Top goalscorer: League: Darío Cvitanich (9); All: Darío Cvitanich (9)
- Highest home attendance: 10,156 (Apr 8 vs. Tampa Bay)
- Lowest home attendance: League: 1,229 (May 28 vs. Edmonton); All: 300 (Jun 1 vs. Wilmington)
- Average home league attendance: League: 3,764; All: 3,187

The 2016 Miami FC season was the club's first season of existence. The club plays in the North American Soccer League, the second tier of the American soccer pyramid.

== Roster ==
As of match played October 28, 2016

No.	Name	Nationality	Position	Date of birth (age)	Signed from	Signed in	Contract ends	Apps.	Goals
Goalkeepers
1	Sebastian Evers	(United States)	GK	January 2, 1991 (age 35)	Jacksonville Armada	2016		0	0
17	Mario Daniel Vega	(Argentina)	GK	June 3, 1984 (age 42)	(Cyprus) Anorthosis Famagusta	2016		32	0
33	Lionel Brown	(United States)	GK	September 17, 1987 (age 39)	Fort Lauderdale Strikers	2016		0	0
Defenders
2	Jonathan Borrajo	(United States)	DF	June 2, 1987 (age 39)	Fort Lauderdale Strikers	2016		28	0
3	Brad Rusin	(United States)	DF	September 5, 1986 (age 40)	San Antonio Scorpions	2016		7	1
4	Adaílton	(Brazil)	DF	April 16, 1983 (age 43)	Chicago Fire	2016		17	0
5	Mason Trafford	(Canada)	DF	August 21, 1986 (age 40)	Ottawa Fury	2016		32	0
15	Hunter Freeman	(United States)	DF	January 8, 1985 (age 41)	New York Cosmos	2016		11	0
16	Nassim Menzou	(France)	DF	May 7, 1994 (age 32)	Miami City	2016		7	0
18	Rhett Bernstein	(United States)	DF	September 10, 1987 (age 39)	(Norway) Mjøndalen	2016		28	1
24	Joe Franco	(United States)	DF	January 26, 1990 (age 36)	LA Galaxy II	2016		2	0
Midfielders
6	Ariel Martínez	(Cuba)	MF	May 9, 1986 (age 40)	Charleston Battery	2016		27	7
7	Roberto Alterio	(Venezuela)	MF	August 31, 1990 (age 36)	FIU Panthers	2016		0	0
8	Wilson Palacios	(Honduras)	MF	July 29, 1984 (age 42)		2016		18	0
10	Kwadwo Poku	(Ghana)	MF	February 19, 1992 (age 34)	New York City	2016		20	6
13	Conner Rezende	(United States)	MF	January 12, 1993 (age 33)	Michigan Bucks	2016		0	0
14	Robert Baggio Kcira	(United States)	MF	September 1, 1994 (age 32)	(Austria) Wiener Neustadt	2016		3	0
19	Dane Richards	(Jamaica)	MF	December 14, 1983 (age 42)	New York Red Bulls	2016		10	0
20	Richie Ryan	(Republic of Ireland)	MF	January 6, 1985 (age 41)	Jacksonville Armada	2016		14	0
21	Calvin Rezende	(United States)	MF	January 12, 1993 (age 33)	Michigan Bucks	2016		15	0
22	Jonny Steele	(Northern Ireland)	MF	February 7, 1986 (age 40)	(Canada) Ottawa Fury	2016		17	2
23	Blake Smith	(United States)	MF	January 17, 1991 (age 35)	(Switzerland) Yverdon Sport	2016		31	0
26	Michael Lahoud	(Sierra Leone)	MF	September 15, 1986 (age 40)	Philadelphia Union	2016		16	1
28	Gabriel Farfán	(United States)	MF	June 23, 1988 (age 38)	Chiapas	2016		16	1
Forwards
9	Jaime Chavez	(United States)	FW	July 17, 1987 (age 39)	Atlanta Silverbacks	2016		24	6
11	Aaron Dennis	(United States)	FW	February 24, 1993 (age 33)	Arizona United	2016		9	1
12	Darío Cvitanich	(Argentina)	FW	May 16, 1984 (age 42)	(Mexico) Pachuca	2016		27	9
77	Vincenzo Rennella	(France)	FW	October 8, 1988 (age 38)	loan from (Spain) Real Valladolid	2016	2016	14	3
83	Pablo Campos	(Brazil)	FW	January 29, 1983 (age 43)	Minnesota United	2016		16	1

=== Staff ===
- (Italy) Mauro Pederzoli – Technical Director
- (Italy) Alessandro Nesta – Head Coach
- (Italy) Lorenzo Rubinacci – Assistant coach
- (Italy) Vincenzo Benvenuto – Goalkeeper coach
- (Canada) Paolo Pacione – Head of Performance and Fitness Coach

== Transfers ==
=== Winter ===
In: Note: Flags indicate national team as defined under FIFA eligibility rules; some limited exceptions apply. Players may hold more than one non-FIFA nationality.

No.	Pos.	Nation	Player
1	GK	ESP	David Sierra (from (United States) Jacksonville Armada)
2	DF	USA	Jonathan Borrajo (from (United States) Fort Lauderdale Strikers)
3	DF	USA	Brad Rusin (from (United States) San Antonio Scorpions)
4	DF	BRA	Adaílton (from (United States) Chicago Fire)
5	DF	CAN	Mason Trafford (from (Canada) Ottawa Fury)
6	MF	CUB	Ariel Martínez (from (United States) Charleston Battery)
7	MF	VEN	Roberto Alterio (from (United States) FIU Panthers)
8	MF	HON	Wilson Palacios
9	FW	USA	Jaime Chavez (from (United States) Atlanta Silverbacks)
10	MF	BRA	Matuzalém (from (Italy) Hellas Verona)
11	FW	USA	Aaron Dennis (from (United States) Arizona United)
12	FW	ARG	Darío Cvitanich (from (Mexico) Pachuca)
13	DF	CUB	Jorge Luis Corrales (from (Cuba) Pinar del Río)
14	MF	USA	Robert Baggio Kcira (from (Austria) Wiener Neustadt)
15	MF	USA	Sergio van Kanten (from (United States) Miami Dade)
16	DF	FRA	Hugo Leroux (from (United States) Miami City)
17	GK	ARG	Mario Daniel Vega (from (Cyprus) Anorthosis Famagusta)
18	DF	USA	Rhett Bernstein (from (Norway) Mjøndalen)
19	MF	JAM	Dane Richards (from (United States) New York Red Bulls)
21	MF	USA	Calvin Rezende (from (United States) Michigan Bucks)
22	MF	USA	Conner Rezende (from (United States) Michigan Bucks)
23	MF	USA	Blake Smith (from (Switzerland) Yverdon Sport)
24	DF	USA	Joe Franco (from (United States) LA Galaxy II)
33	GK	USA	Lionel Brown (from (United States) Fort Lauderdale Strikers)
83	FW	BRA	Pablo Campos (from (United States) Minnesota United)

Out: Note: Flags indicate national team as defined under FIFA eligibility rules; some limited exceptions apply. Players may hold more than one non-FIFA nationality.

No.	Pos.	Nation	Player

=== Summer ===
In: Note: Flags indicate national team as defined under FIFA eligibility rules; some limited exceptions apply. Players may hold more than one non-FIFA nationality.

No.	Pos.	Nation	Player
1	GK	USA	Sebastian Evers (from (United States) Jacksonville Armada)
10	MF	GHA	Kwadwo Poku (from (United States) New York City)
15	DF	USA	Hunter Freeman (from (United States) New York Cosmos)
20	MF	IRL	Richie Ryan (from (United States) Jacksonville Armada)
22	MF	NIR	Jonny Steele (from (Canada) Ottawa Fury)
26	MF	SLE	Michael Lahoud (from (United States) Philadelphia Union, previously on loan to (United States) New York Cosmos)
27	MF	USA	Bryan Arguez (from (United States) Miami City)
28	MF	USA	Gabriel Farfán (from (Mexico) Chiapas)
77	FW	FRA	Vincenzo Rennella (loan from (Spain) Real Valladolid)

Out: Note: Flags indicate national team as defined under FIFA eligibility rules; some limited exceptions apply. Players may hold more than one non-FIFA nationality.

No.	Pos.	Nation	Player
1	GK	ESP	David Sierra
10	MF	BRA	Matuzalém
13	DF	CUB	Jorge Luis Corrales (to (United States) Fort Lauderdale Strikers)
15	MF	USA	Sergio van Kanten
27	MF	USA	Bryan Arguez (to (United States) Fort Lauderdale Strikers)

== Friendlies ==
January 23, 2016	Miami	4–0	Boca Raton FC	Miami Gardens
7:00 a.m. EDT	Chavez Martínez	Summary		Stadium: St. Thomas University; Attendance: Closed-door

January 30, 2016	Miami	5–0	Albion SC Plantation	Miami Gardens
7:30 a.m. EDT	Alterio; Martínez; Dennis; Riascos; Kcira	Summary		Stadium: St. Thomas University; Attendance: Closed-door

February 6, 2016	Miami	2–0	Miami United	Miami Gardens
7:30 a.m. EDT	Kcira; Alterio	Summary		Stadium: St. Thomas University; Attendance: Closed-door

February 12, 2016	Miami	7–1	FC Miami City	Miami Gardens
7:30 a.m. EDT	Cvitanich,, Martínez, Co. Rezende; Smith	Summary	Goal	Stadium: St. Thomas University; Attendance: Closed-door

February 17, 2016	FIU Panthers	0–1	Miami	Miami
10:30 a.m. EDT		Summary	Adaílton	Stadium: FIU Soccer Stadium

February 27, 2016	Miami	2–0	Barry Buccaneers	Miami Gardens
11:00 EDT	Martínez; Dennis	Summary		Stadium: St. Thomas University

March 3, 2016	Miami	1–1	Charleston Battery	Jacksonville
10:00 EDT	Chavez 20'	[ Summary]	Garbanzo 30'	Stadium: Patton Park

March 5, 2016	Miami	2–0	Tulsa Roughnecks	Jacksonville
10:00 EDT	Campos, 70'	[ Summary]		Stadium: Patton Park

March 9, 2016	Miami	1–2	Jacksonville Armada	Miami Gardens
11:00 EDT	Campos 45' (pen.)	Report	Sandoval 2'; Bahner (yellow card) 52'; Johnson 87' (pen.)	Stadium: St. Thomas University

March 12, 2016	Miami	1–0	Rayo OKC	Miami Gardens
11:00 EDT	Martínez 28'	Report		Stadium: St. Thomas University

March 26, 2016	Miami	4–0	Miami Fusion FC	Miami
19:00 EDT	Chavez 4'; Martínez 18'; Smith 56'; Campos 86'	Report		Stadium: FIU Stadium

== Competitions ==
=== NASL Spring season ===
==== Standings ====
Pos	Team	Pld	W	D	L	GF	GA	GD	Pts	Qualification
1	Indy Eleven (S)	10	4	6	0	15	8	+7	18	Playoffs
2	New York Cosmos	10	6	0	4	15	8	+7	18	
3	FC Edmonton	10	5	2	3	9	7	+2	17	
4	Minnesota United	10	5	1	4	16	12	+4	16	
5	Tampa Bay Rowdies	10	4	4	2	11	9	+2	16	
6	Fort Lauderdale Strikers	10	4	3	3	12	12	0	15	
7	Carolina RailHawks	10	4	2	4	11	13	−2	14	
8	Rayo OKC	10	3	3	4	11	12	−1	12	
9	Ottawa Fury	10	2	3	5	9	14	−5	9	
10	Jacksonville Armada	10	1	4	5	5	11	−6	7	
11	Miami FC	10	1	4	5	7	15	−8	7	

Source: NASL
Rules for classification: 1) points; 2) total goal differential; 3) total goals scored; 4) head-to-head record; 5) away goal differential; 6) away goals scored
(S) Spring season champion

==== Results summary ====
Overall								Home						Away					
Pld	W	D	L	GF	GA	GD	Pts	W	D	L	GF	GA	GD	W	D	L	GF	GA	GD
10	1	4	5	7	15	−8	7	1	2	2	4	7	−3	0	2	3	3	8	−5

Last updated: June 11, 2016.
Source: Match reports

==== Results by round ====
Round	1	2	3	4	5	6	7	8	9	10
Stadium	A	H	A	H	A	H	A	H	H	A
Result	D	D	L	L	L	L	D	W	D	L
Position	3	3	7	9	10	11	11	10	10	11

Updated to match(es) played on June 11, 2016. Source: Match reports
A = Away; H = Home; W = Win; D = Draw; L = Loss

==== Matches ====
April 2, 2016 1	Fort Lauderdale Strikers	1–1	Miami	Fort Lauderdale
19:00 EDT	James (yellow card) 23'; Felipe (yellow card) 42'; Santos 90+4' (pen.)	MIA Report; NASL Report; Summary	Cvitanich 12' (pen.); Corrales (yellow card) 21' (yellow-red card) 45+1'; Bernstein (yellow card) 50'; Smith (yellow card) 64'; Chavez (yellow card) 90'	Stadium: Lockhart Stadium; Attendance: 2,331; Referee: Jose Rivero

April 8, 2016 2	Miami	1–1	Tampa Bay Rowdies	Miami
20:00 EDT	Cvitanich 17' (yellow card) 72'; Palacios (yellow card) 75'	MIA Report; NASL Report; Summary	Sweat (yellow card) 20'; King (yellow card) 42'; Hristov 85' (pen.) (yellow card) 86'	Stadium: FIU Stadium; Attendance: 10,156

April 15, 2016 3	Jacksonville Armada	2–1	Miami	Jacksonville
19:00 EDT	Sandoval 20'; Ruthven (yellow card) 25'; Millien 36'; George (yellow card) 57'; Eloundou (yellow card) 73'	MIA Report; NASL Report; Summary	Cvitanich 26' (yellow card) 39'; Vega (yellow card) 90+3'	Stadium: Baseball Grounds of Jacksonville; Attendance: 5,112; Referee: Sorin Stoica

April 22, 2016 4	Miami	2–3	Rayo OKC	Miami
19:00 EDT	Trafford (yellow card) 33'; Martinez 36'; Ca. Rezende (yellow card) 62'; Rusin 75'	MIA Report; NASL Report; Summary	Findley 15'; Forbes 25'; Boateng (yellow card) 81'; Michel (yellow card) 81', (goal) 86' (pen.)	Stadium: FIU Stadium; Attendance: 2,168; Referee: Rubiel Vazquez

April 30, 2016 5	Ottawa Fury	2–0	Miami	Ottawa
14:00 EDT	Timbó 25'; Rozeboom (yellow card) 57'; Vered (yellow card) 65'; Chin 90+4'	MIA Report; NASL Report; Summary	van Kanten (yellow card) 24'; Richards (yellow card) 73'	Stadium: TD Place Stadium; Attendance: 7,023; Referee: David Barrie

May 6, 2016 6	Miami	0–3	New York Cosmos	Miami
20:00 EDT	Borrajo (yellow card) 19'; Cvitanich (yellow card) 67'; Ca. Rezende (yellow card) 76'	MIA Report; NASL Report; Summary	Arango 18'; Farfan 34' (yellow card) 67'; Ayoze (yellow card) 45+1'; Arrieta 50' (yellow card) 62'	Stadium: FIU Stadium; Attendance: 3,432; Referee: Younes Marrakchi

May 14, 2016 7	Carolina RailHawks	0–0	Miami	Cary
19:30 EDT		MIA Report; NASL Report; Summary	Adaílton (yellow card) 31'; Trafford (yellow card) 72'	Stadium: WakeMed Soccer Park; Attendance: 7,107; Referee: Baboucarr Jallow

May 28, 2016 8	Miami	1–0	Edmonton	Miami
20:00 EDT	Martínez 67'	Summary	Ledgerwood (yellow card) 55'; Diakité (yellow card) 63'; Eckersley (yellow card) 75'	Stadium: FIU Stadium; Attendance: 1,229; Referee: Jamie Herrera Garduño

June 4, 2016 9	Miami	0–0	Indy Eleven	Miami
20:00 EDT	Adaílton (yellow card) 81'	Summary	Larrea (yellow card) 83'; Franco (yellow card) 90'	Stadium: FIU Stadium; Attendance: 1,837; Referee: Allen Chapman

June 11, 2016 10	Minnesota United	3–1	Miami	Blaine
20:00 EDT	Ibson (yellow card) 40' (goal) 90+4'; Ramirez 46'; Stefano 52'	Summary	Ryan (yellow card) 55'; Chavez 66'; Martínez (yellow card) 66'	Stadium: National Sports Center; Attendance: 9,102; Referee: Alejandro Mariscal

=== NASL Fall season ===
==== Standings ====
Pos	Team	Pld	W	D	L	GF	GA	GD	Pts	Qualification
1	New York Cosmos (F)	22	14	5	3	44	21	+23	47	Playoffs
2	Indy Eleven	22	11	4	7	36	25	+11	37	
3	FC Edmonton	22	10	6	6	16	14	+2	36	
4	Rayo OKC	22	9	8	5	28	21	+7	35	
5	Miami FC	22	9	6	7	31	27	+4	33	
6	Fort Lauderdale Strikers	22	7	5	10	19	28	−9	26	
7	Carolina RailHawks	22	7	5	10	25	35	−10	26	
8	Minnesota United	22	6	7	9	25	25	0	25	
9	Puerto Rico	22	5	9	8	19	31	−12	24	
10	Tampa Bay Rowdies	22	5	8	9	29	32	−3	23	
11	Jacksonville Armada	22	5	8	9	25	35	−10	23	
12	Ottawa Fury	22	5	7	10	23	26	−3	22	

Source: NASL
Rules for classification: 1) points; 2) total goal differential; 3) total goals scored; 4) head-to-head record; 5) away goal differential; 6) away goals scored
(F) Fall season champion

==== Results summary ====
Overall								Home						Away					
Pld	W	D	L	GF	GA	GD	Pts	W	D	L	GF	GA	GD	W	D	L	GF	GA	GD
22	9	6	7	31	27	+4	33	5	2	4	12	12	0	4	4	3	19	15	+4

Last updated: October 28, 2016.
Source: Match reports

==== Results by round ====
Round	1	2	3	4	5	6	7	8	9	10	11	12	13	14	15	16	17	18	19	20	21	22
Stadium	A	H	H	A	H	A	H	A	A	H	H	A	H	A	H	H	A	H	H	A	A	H
Result	D	L	W	D	W	W	L	W	D	D	W	W	W	L	L	W	D	L	D	L	L	W
Position	7	9	8	7	7	5	5	5	4	4	5	3	2	3	4	2	3	3	4	5	5	5

Updated to match(es) played on October 19, 2016. Source: Match reports
A = Away; H = Home; W = Win; D = Draw; L = Loss

==== Matches ====
July 2, 2016 1	Fort Lauderdale Strikers	1–1	Miami	Fort Lauderdale
19:00 EDT	Moura (yellow card) 29'; Agbossoumonde 53' (yellow card) 59'; James (yellow card) 55'; Restrepo (yellow card) 69'	Summary	Cvitanich 18' (pen.); Farfán (yellow card) 33'; Richards (yellow card) 79'	Stadium: Lockhart Stadium; Attendance: 1,431; Referee: Mark Geiger

July 9, 2016 2	Miami	2–3	New York Cosmos	Miami
20:00 EDT	Poku (yellow card) 52' (goal) 73'; Cvitanich 87' (pen.)	Summary	Holt (yellow card) 17'; Mkosana 39', 90+2'; Diosa (yellow card) 70'; Bover (yellow card) 77'; Orozco 81'; Flores (yellow card) 90+3'	Stadium: FIU Stadium; Attendance: 4,519; Referee: Marcos de Oliveira

July 16, 2016 3	Miami	1–0	Jacksonville Armada	Miami
20:00 EDT	Trafford (yellow card) 14'; Ryan (yellow card) 25'; Chavez 90+2'	Summary	Navarro (red card) 11'; Wallace (yellow card) 61'; George (yellow card) 65'; Lewis (yellow card) 90+1'	Stadium: FIU Stadium; Attendance: 3,627; Referee: Younes Marrakchi

July 22, 2016 4	Carolina RailHawks	3–3	Miami	Cary
19:30 EDT	Fondy 30'; Marcelin (yellow card) 58'; Shriver 61'; Bravo 78'; Beckie (yellow card) 82'; Mensing (yellow card) 84'	Summary	Chavez 7', 80'; Poku 37' (yellow card) 90'; Trafford (yellow card) 65'	Stadium: WakeMed Soccer Park; Attendance: 6,060; Referee: Marcos de Oliveira

July 30, 2016 5	Miami	2–1	Indy Eleven	Miami
20:00 EDT	Cvitanich 4'; Steele (yellow card) 42'; Farfán (yellow card) 57'; Poku (yellow card) 79'; Vega (yellow card) 84'; Martínez 85'	Summary	Janicki (yellow card) 87'; Zayed 89'	Stadium: FIU Stadium; Attendance: 5,076; Referee: Nima Saghafi

August 6, 2016 6	Minnesota United	0–4	Miami	Blaine
20:00 EDT	Blake (yellow card) 19'; Brovsky (yellow card) 60'; Kallman (yellow card) 86'	Summary	Steele 9' (yellow card) 62'; Martínez 21'; Poku 26'; Farfán (yellow card) 49'; Dennis 87'	Stadium: National Sports Center; Attendance: 9,040; Referee: Mathieu Bourdeau

August 13, 2016 7	Miami	0–2	Fort Lauderdale Strikers	Miami
20:00 EDT	Palacios (yellow card) 57'; Steele (yellow card) 59'	Summary	Corrales (yellow card) 38'; Paulo Jr. 84'; Amauri 86'	Stadium: FIU Stadium; Attendance: 7,152; Referee: Ted Unkel

August 20, 2016 8	Rayo OKC	1–2	Miami	Yukon
21:00 EDT	Findley 25'; Samaras (yellow card) 55'; Forbes (yellow card) 82'; Ibeagha (yellow card) 88'; Hernandez (yellow card) 90+1'	Summary	Poku (yellow card) 77'; Campos 79'; Martínez 90+4'	Stadium: Miller Stadium; Attendance: 1,251; Referee: Victor Rivas

August 24, 2016 9	Ottawa Fury	0–0	Miami	Ottawa
19:00 EDT	Olivera (yellow card) 90'	Summary		Stadium: TD Place Stadium; Attendance: 4,852; Referee: Pierre Luce Lauziere

August 27, 2016 10	Miami	1–1	Minnesota United	Miami
20:00 EDT	Martínez (yellow card) 47'; Poku 51'; Borrajo (yellow card) 86'	Summary	Laing (yellow card) 38' (goal) 58'	Stadium: FIU Stadium; Attendance: 9,739; Referee: Luis Guardia

September 3, 2016 11	Puerto Rico	0–3	Miami	Bayamón
19:30 EDT		Summary	Steele 15'; Cvitanich 54'; Poku 88'	Stadium: Juan Ramón Loubriel Stadium; Attendance: 2,556; Referee: Sandy Vasquez

September 11, 2016 12	Edmonton	0–2	Miami	Edmonton
16:00 EDT	Eckersley (yellow card) 76'	Summary	Cvitanich 14'; Poku (yellow card) 52'; Rennella 71'; Vega (yellow card) 87'	Stadium: Clarke Stadium; Attendance: 1,526; Referee: David Barrie

September 14, 2016 13	Miami	1–0	Carolina RailHawks	Miami
20:00 EDT	Cvitanich 77' (yellow card) 90+3'	Summary	Daly (yellow card) 42'; Moses (yellow card) 63'; Bravo (yellow card) 90+3'	Stadium: FIU Stadium; Attendance: 6,592; Referee: Rubiel Vazquez

September 17, 2016 14	Indy Eleven	2–1	Miami	Indianapolis
19:30 EDT	Mares 25' (yellow card) 50'; Smart 57'	Summary	Palacios (yellow card) 55'; Rennella 67'	Stadium: Michael Carroll Stadium; Attendance: 9,356; Referee: Fotis Bazakos

September 23, 2016 15	Miami	0–1	Puerto Rico	Miami
20:00 EDT	Smith (yellow card) 20'	Summary	Soria (yellow card) 21'; Nurse (yellow card) 38'; Campos 79' (o.g.); Oliver (yellow card) 84'; Ramos (yellow card) 90+5'	Stadium: FIU Stadium; Attendance: 10,012; Referee: Geoff Gamble

September 28, 2016 16	Miami	2–1	Ottawa Fury	Miami
20:00 EDT	Lahoud 35'; Farfán (yellow card) 62'; Rennella (yellow card) 69' (goal) 90+5'	Summary	Gentile 44'; Dixon (yellow card) 66'	Stadium: FIU Stadium; Attendance: 3,116; Referee: Nima Saghafi

October 1, 2016 17	Tampa Bay Rowdies	1–1	Miami	St. Petersburg
19:30 EDT	Preciado (yellow card) 26'; Avila 31'; Vingaard (yellow card) 55'	Summary	Freeman (yellow card) 57'; Bernstein 74'	Stadium: Al Lang Stadium; Attendance: 6,912; Referee: Ted Unkel

October 9, 2016 18	Miami	0–1	Rayo OKC	Miami
20:00 EDT	Smith (yellow card) 64'; Ryan (red card) 89'	Summary	Michel 71' (pen.) van Schaik (yellow card) 77'; Chávez (yellow card) 79'	Stadium: FIU Stadium; Attendance: 4,207; Referee: Alex Chilowicz

October 15, 2016 19	Miami	2–2	Tampa Bay Rowdies	Miami
20:00 EDT	Chavez 16' (yellow card) 56'; Poku 21'	Summary	Hristov 27'; PC (yellow card) 65'; Guerra 67'; Preciado (yellow card) 83'; Mkandawire (yellow card) 90+1'	Stadium: FIU Stadium; Attendance: 5,215; Referee: Jose Rivero

October 19, 2016 20	Jacksonville Armada	3–2	Miami	Jacksonville
19:00 EDT	Eloundou 1'; George (yellow card) 23'; Dixon 69'; Scaglia 74'	Summary	Ryan (yellow card) 12'; Martínez 27'; Chavez (yellow card) 60'; Farfán 65' (yellow card) 90'; Poku (yellow card) 88' (red card) 90+3'; Borrajo (yellow card) 90+3'	Stadium: Baseball Grounds of Jacksonville; Attendance: 1,608; Referee: Daniel Radford

October 22, 2016 21	New York Cosmos	4–0	Miami	Hempstead
19:00 EDT	Arrieta 2'; Orozco 7', 36'; Arango 30'	Summary	Freeman (yellow card) 31'	Stadium: Shuart Stadium; Attendance: 5,852; Referee: Jorge Gonzalez

October 28, 2016 22	Miami	1–0	Edmonton	Miami
20:00 EDT	Martínez 65'; Poku (yellow card) 82'	Summary	Galvao (yellow card) 81'	Stadium: FIU Stadium; Attendance: 8,756; Referee: Rubiel Vazquez

=== U.S. Open Cup ===
June 1, 2016 Third round	Miami	1–2	Wilmington Hammerheads	Miami
20:00 EDT	Chavez 52'; Lahoud (yellow card) 65'; Smith (yellow card) 84'; Adaílton (yellow card) 88'	Summary	Michaud 2'; Moose 5'; Parratt (yellow card) 64'; Ati (yellow card) 81'	Stadium: FIU Stadium; Attendance: 300; Referee: Guido Gonzalez

== Squad statistics ==
As of Match played October 28, 2016

=== Appearances and goals ===
No.	Pos	Nat	Player	Total		NASL Spring Season		NASL Fall Season		U.S. Open Cup	
No.	Pos	Nat	Player	Apps	Goals	Apps	Goals	Apps	Goals	Apps	Goals
2	DF	(United States) USA	Jonathan Borrajo	28	0	9	0	19	0	0	0
3	DF	(United States) USA	Brad Rusin	7	1	4+3	1	0	0	0	0
4	DF	(Brazil) BRA	Adaílton	17	0	10	0	2+4	0	1	0
5	DF	(Canada) CAN	Mason Trafford	32	0	9	0	22	0	1	0
6	MF	(Cuba) CUB	Ariel Martínez	27	7	9	2	10+7	5	1	0
8	MF	(Honduras) HON	Wilson Palacios	18	0	1+3	0	13+1	0	0	0
9	FW	(United States) USA	Jaime Chavez	24	6	8+2	1	11+2	4	0+1	1
10	MF	(Ghana) GHA	Kwadwo Poku	20	6	0	0	19+1	6	0	0
11	FW	(United States) USA	Aaron Dennis	9	1	0+4	0	1+4	1	0	0
12	FW	(Argentina) ARG	Darío Cvitanich	27	9	9	3	14+3	6	0+1	0
14	MF	(United States) USA	Robert Baggio Kcira	3	0	0+2	0	0+1	0	0	0
15	DF	(United States) USA	Hunter Freeman	11	0	0	0	9+2	0	0	0
16	DF	(France) FRA	Hugo Leroux	7	0	5+1	0	0	0	1	0
17	GK	(Argentina) ARG	Mario Daniel Vega	32	0	10	0	22	0	0	0
18	DF	(United States) USA	Rhett Bernstein	28	1	6	0	20+2	1	0	0
19	MF	(Jamaica) JAM	Dane Richards	10	0	3+2	0	1+3	0	1	0
20	MF	(Republic of Ireland) IRL	Richie Ryan	14	0	4	0	8+1	0	1	0
21	MF	(United States) USA	Calvin Rezende	15	0	5+1	0	4+4	0	0+1	0
22	MF	(Northern Ireland) NIR	Jonny Steele	17	2	0	0	15+2	2	0	0
23	MF	(United States) USA	Blake Smith	31	0	9+1	0	15+5	0	1	0
24	DF	(United States) USA	Joe Franco	2	0	1	0	0	0	1	0
26	MF	(Sierra Leone) SLE	Michael Lahoud	16	1	3	0	11+1	1	1	0
28	MF	(United States) USA	Gabriel Farfán	16	1	0	0	15+1	1	0	0
77	FW	(France) FRA	Vincenzo Rennella	14	3	0	0	9+5	3	0	0
83	FW	(Brazil) BRA	Pablo Campos	16	1	2+4	0	2+7	1	1	0
Players who left Miami FC during the season:
1	GK	(Spain) ESP	David Sierra	1	0	0	0	0	0	1	0
10	MF	(Brazil) BRA	Matuzalém	3	0	2+1	0	0	0	0	0
13	DF	(Cuba) CUB	Jorge Luis Corrales	1	0	1	0	0	0	0	0
15	MF	(United States) USA	Sergio van Kanten	1	0	1	0	0	0	0	0

=== Goal scorers ===
Place	Position	Nation	Number	Name	NASL Spring Season	NASL Fall Season	U.S. Open Cup	Total
1	FW	(Argentina)	12	Darío Cvitanich	3	6	0	9
2	MF	(Cuba)	6	Ariel Martínez	2	5	0	7
3	FW	(United States)	9	Jaime Chavez	1	4	1	6
3	MF	(Ghana)	10	Kwadwo Poku	0	6	0	6
5	FW	(France)	77	Vincenzo Rennella	0	3	0	3
6	MF	(Northern Ireland)	22	Jonny Steele	0	2	0	2
7	DF	(United States)	3	Brad Rusin	1	0	0	1
7	FW	(United States)	11	Aaron Dennis	0	1	0	1
7	FW	(Brazil)	83	Pablo Campos	0	1	0	1
7	MF	(Sierra Leone)	26	Michael Lahoud	0	1	0	1
7	DF	(United States)	18	Rhett Bernstein	0	1	0	1
7	MF	(United States)	28	Gabriel Farfán	0	1	0	1
TOTALS					7	30	1	38

=== Disciplinary record ===
Number	Nation	Position	Name	NASL Spring Season		NASL Fall Season		U.S. Open Cup		Total	
Number	Nation	Position	Name	Yellow card	Red card	Yellow card	Red card	Yellow card	Red card	Yellow card	Red card
2	(United States)	DF	Jonathan Borrajo	1	0	2	0	0	0	3	0
4	(Brazil)	DF	Adaílton	2	0	0	0	1	0	3	0
5	(Canada)	DF	Mason Trafford	2	0	2	0	0	0	4	0
6	(Cuba)	MF	Ariel Martínez	1	0	1	0	0	0	2	0
8	(Honduras)	MF	Wilson Palacios	1	0	2	0	0	0	3	0
9	(United States)	FW	Jaime Chavez	1	0	2	0	0	0	3	0
10	(Ghana)	MF	Kwadwo Poku	0	0	7	1	0	0	7	1
12	(Argentina)	FW	Darío Cvitanich	3	0	1	0	0	0	4	0
13	(Cuba)	DF	Jorge Luis Corrales	1	0	0	0	0	0	1	0
15	(United States)	MF	Sergio van Kanten	1	0	2	0	0	0	3	0
17	(Argentina)	GK	Mario Daniel Vega	1	0	2	0	0	0	3	0
18	(United States)	DF	Rhett Bernstein	1	0	0	0	0	0	1	0
19	(Jamaica)	MF	Dane Richards	1	0	1	0	0	0	2	0
20	(Republic of Ireland)	MF	Richie Ryan	1	0	2	1	0	0	3	1
21	(United States)	MF	Calvin Rezende	2	0	0	0	0	0	2	0
22	(Northern Ireland)	MF	Jonny Steele	0	0	3	0	0	0	3	0
23	(United States)	MF	Blake Smith	1	0	2	0	1	0	4	0
26	(Sierra Leone)	MF	Michael Lahoud	0	0	0	0	1	0	1	0
28	(United States)	MF	Gabriel Farfán	0	0	5	0	0	0	5	0
77	(France)	FW	Vincenzo Rennella	0	0	1	0	0	0	1	0
			TOTALS	22	0	33	2	3	0	58	2
