= 2017 Miami FC season =

Miami FC
2017 season
- Co-Owner: Paolo Maldini, Riccardo Silva
- Head coach: Alessandro Nesta
- Stadium: Riccardo Silva Stadium
- NASL: Spring: 1st Fall: 1st Combined: 1st
- Soccer Bowl: Semifinal vs New York Cosmos
- U.S. Open Cup: Quarterfinal vs Cincinnati
- Top goalscorer: League: Stefano (17); All: Stefano (21)
- Highest home attendance: 10,415 vs Cincinnati (August 2, 2017)
- Lowest home attendance: 897 vs South Florida Surf (May 17, 2017)
- Average home league attendance: 5,223

Miami FC played their second season in 2017 in the North American Soccer League. During the season Miami won both the Spring and Fall NASL season, qualifying for the end of season playoffs where they would go out on penalties to the New York Cosmos in the Semifinals. In the U.S. Open Cup, Miami reached the Quarterfinals before losing to USL side FC Cincinnati 0-1 in a game that had to be re-arranged due to bad weather. Stefano ended the season as the club's top goalscorer with 21 goals across all competitions, 17 coming in the NASL.

== Roster ==
As of match played November 5, 2017

No.	Name	Nationality	Position	Date of birth (age)	Signed from	Signed in	Contract ends	Apps.	Goals
Goalkeepers
1	Ryan Herman	(United States)	GK	June 18, 1993 (aged 24)	FC Dallas	2017		0	0
17	Mario Daniel Vega	(Argentina)	GK	June 3, 1984 (aged 33)	(Cyprus) Anorthosis Famagusta	2016		70	0
33	Lionel Brown	(United States)	GK	September 17, 1987 (aged 30)	Fort Lauderdale Strikers	2016		0	0
Defenders
2	Jonathan Borrajo	(United States)	DF	June 2, 1987 (aged 30)	Fort Lauderdale Strikers	2016		41	0
3	Brad Rusin	(United States)	DF	September 5, 1986 (aged 31)	San Antonio Scorpions	2016		7	1
5	Mason Trafford	(Canada)	DF	August 21, 1986 (aged 31)	Ottawa Fury	2016		64	0
12	Tyler Ruthven	(United States)	DF	July 18, 1998 (aged 19)	Jacksonville Armada	2017		6	0
15	Hunter Freeman	(United States)	DF	January 8, 1985 (aged 32)	New York Cosmos	2016		37	0
18	Rhett Bernstein	(United States)	DF	September 10, 1987 (aged 30)	(Norway) Mjøndalen	2016		59	2
24	Lovel Palmer	(Jamaica)	DF	August 30, 1984 (aged 33)	Indy Eleven	2017		11	0
25	Alessandro Lambrughi	(Italy)	DF	May 19, 1987 (aged 30)	Livorno	2017		4	0
31	Michel	(Brazil)	DF	June 9, 1981 (aged 36)	Rayo OKC	2017		18	1
Midfielders
6	Ariel Martínez	(Cuba)	MF	May 9, 1986 (aged 31)	Charleston Battery	2016		53	10
7	Dylan Mares	(United States)	MF	February 11, 1992 (aged 25)	Indy Eleven	2017		35	8
10	Kwadwo Poku	(Ghana)	MF	February 19, 1992 (aged 25)	New York City	2016		55	15
14	Robert Baggio Kcira	(United States)	MF	September 1, 1994 (aged 23)	(Austria) Wiener Neustadt	2016		16	2
20	Richie Ryan	(Republic of Ireland)	MF	January 6, 1985 (aged 32)	Jacksonville Armada	2016		49	0
21	Calvin Rezende	(United States)	MF	January 12, 1993 (aged 24)	Michigan Bucks	2016		29	0
22	Jonny Steele	(Northern Ireland)	MF	February 7, 1986 (aged 31)	(Canada) Ottawa Fury	2016		19	2
23	Blake Smith	(United States)	MF	January 17, 1991 (aged 26)	(Switzerland) Yverdon Sport	2016		61	1
24	Cizario da Costa	(Guinea-Bissau)	MF	November 30, 1998 (aged 18)		2017		0	0
26	Michael Lahoud	(Sierra Leone)	MF	September 15, 1986 (aged 31)	Philadelphia Union	2016		52	1
28	Gabriel Farfán	(United States)	MF	June 23, 1988 (aged 29)	Chiapas	2016		26	1
Forwards
8	Vincenzo Rennella	(France)	FW	October 8, 1988 (aged 29)	loan from (Spain) Real Valladolid	2016	2017	43	15
9	Jaime Chavez	(United States)	FW	July 17, 1987 (aged 30)	Atlanta Silverbacks	2016		57	18
11	Aaron Dennis	(United States)	FW	February 24, 1993 (aged 24)	Arizona United	2016		9	1
29	Stefano	(Brazil)	FW	January 12, 1991 (aged 26)	Minnesota United FC	2017		31	21

=== Staff ===
- (Italy) Mauro Pederzoli – Technical Director
- (Italy) Federico Bertele' - Assistant Technical Director
- (Italy) Alessandro Nesta – Head Coach
- (Italy) Lorenzo Rubinacci – Assistant coach
- (Italy) Vincenzo Benvenuto – Goalkeeper coach
- (Canada) Paolo Pacione – Head of Performance and Fitness Coach

== Transfers ==
=== Winter ===
In: Note: Flags indicate national team as defined under FIFA eligibility rules; some limited exceptions apply. Players may hold more than one non-FIFA nationality.

No.	Pos.	Nation	Player
1	GK	USA	Ryan Herman (from (United States) FC Dallas)
7	MF	USA	Dylan Mares (from (United States) Indy Eleven)
12	DF	USA	Tyler Ruthven (from (United States) Jacksonville Armada)
24	MF	GBS	Cizario da Costa
29	FW	BRA	Stefano (from (United States) Minnesota United FC)
31	DF	BRA	Michel (from (United States) Rayo OKC)

Out: Note: Flags indicate national team as defined under FIFA eligibility rules; some limited exceptions apply. Players may hold more than one non-FIFA nationality.

No.	Pos.	Nation	Player
1	GK	USA	Sebastian Evers
4	DF	BRA	Adaílton
7	MF	VEN	Roberto Alterio
8	MF	HON	Wilson Palacios
12	FW	ARG	Darío Cvitanich (to (Argentina) Banfield)
13	MF	USA	Conner Rezende
16	DF	FRA	Hugo Leroux
19	MF	JAM	Dane Richards
24	DF	USA	Joe Franco (to (United States) Orange County)
83	FW	BRA	Pablo Campos

=== Summer ===
In: Note: Flags indicate national team as defined under FIFA eligibility rules; some limited exceptions apply. Players may hold more than one non-FIFA nationality.

No.	Pos.	Nation	Player
24	DF	JAM	Lovel Palmer (from (United States) Indy Eleven)
25	DF	ITA	Alessandro Lambrughi (from (Italy) Livorno)

Out: Note: Flags indicate national team as defined under FIFA eligibility rules; some limited exceptions apply. Players may hold more than one non-FIFA nationality.

No.	Pos.	Nation	Player

== Competitions ==
=== NASL Spring season ===
==== Standings ====
Pos	Team	Pld	W	D	L	GF	GA	GD	Pts	Qualification
1	Miami FC (S)	16	11	3	2	33	11	+22	36	Playoffs
2	San Francisco Deltas	16	7	5	4	17	20	−3	26	
3	New York Cosmos	16	6	6	4	22	21	+1	24	
4	Jacksonville Armada	16	6	6	4	17	16	+1	24	
5	North Carolina FC	16	6	3	7	21	22	−1	21	
6	Indy Eleven	16	4	8	4	21	22	−1	20	
7	FC Edmonton	16	4	1	11	11	21	−10	13	
8	Puerto Rico FC	16	1	6	9	19	28	−9	9	

Source: NASL
Rules for classification: 1) points; 2) total goal differential; 3) total goals scored; 4) head-to-head record; 5) away goal differential; 6) away goals scored
(S) Spring season champion

==== Results summary ====
Overall								Home						Away					
Pld	W	D	L	GF	GA	GD	Pts	W	D	L	GF	GA	GD	W	D	L	GF	GA	GD
16	11	3	2	33	11	+22	36	5	2	1	20	7	+13	6	1	1	13	4	+9

Last updated: July 15, 2017.
Source: Match reports

==== Results by round ====
Round	1	2	3	4	5	6	7	8	9	10	11	12	13	14	15	16
Stadium	A	A	H	H	H	A	H	A	H	A	A	H	H	A	H	A
Result	D	W	L	D	W	W	W	W	D	W	W	W	W	L	W	W
Position	2	1	3	3	2	1	1	1	1	1	1	1	1	1	1	1

Updated to match(es) played on July 8, 2017. Source: Match reports
A = Away; H = Home; W = Win; D = Draw; L = Loss

==== Matches ====
March 25, 2017 1	North Carolina	1–1	Miami	Cary
19:30 EDT	Fondy 4'; Ibeagha (yellow card) 90+2'	Report	Poku 13'; Farfán (yellow card) 18'; Freeman (yellow card) 22'; Stefano (yellow card) 45+2'; Mares (yellow card) 87'	Stadium: WakeMed Soccer Park; Attendance: 6,058; Referee: Mark Kadlecik

April 1, 2017 2	New York Cosmos	0–3	Miami	Brooklyn
19:00 EDT	Szetela (yellow card) 53'; Mulligan (yellow card) 84' (yellow-red card) 90+3'	Report	Mares 51' (yellow card) 54'; Richter 67' (o.g.); Stefano 71'; Poku (yellow card) 74'	Stadium: MCU Park; Attendance: 6,274; Referee: Rosendo Mendoza

April 8, 2017 3	Miami	0–2	New York Cosmos	Miami
19:30 EDT	Ryan (yellow card) 63'; Lahoud (yellow card) 84'; Freeman (yellow card) 90+3'	Report	Guerra (yellow card) 37'; Szetela 58'; Márquez (yellow card) 77'; Ayoze 90+4' (pen.)	Stadium: Riccardo Silva Stadium; Attendance: 9,515; Referee: Marcos de Oliveira

April 22, 2017 4	Miami	1–1	North Carolina	Miami
19:30 EDT	Kcira 90+5'	Report	Laing 63'; Tobin (yellow card) 81'	Stadium: Riccardo Silva Stadium; Attendance: 6,015; Referee: Rubiel Vazquez

April 29, 2017 5	Miami	2–0	Edmonton	Miami
19:30 EDT	Stefano (yellow card) 11' (goal) 64'; Poku 35'	Report	Zebie (yellow card) 60'; Nyassi (yellow card) 77'; Diakité (yellow card) 82'; Shiels (yellow card) 87'	Stadium: Riccardo Silva Stadium; Attendance: 6,112; Referee: Alex Chilowicz

May 6, 2017 6	Puerto Rico	1–2	Miami	Bayamón
19:30 EDT	Welshman 24'; Gentile (yellow card) 50'	Report	Rennella 82'; Chavez 90+4'	Stadium: Juan Ramón Loubriel Stadium; Attendance: 2,345; Referee: Jeffrey Solis

May 13, 2017 7	Miami	3–2	Indy Eleven	Miami
19:30 EDT	Rennella 45+1'; Mares 61'; Kcira 65'; Trafford (yellow card) 76'; Vega (yellow card) 77'	Report	Torrado (yellow card) 40'; Thompson (yellow card) 60'; Freeman 56' (o.g.); Braun 83'	Stadium: Riccardo Silva Stadium; Attendance: 5,735; Referee: Ramy Touchan

May 20, 2017 8	Indy Eleven	0–2	Miami	Indianapolis
19:30 EDT	Torrado (yellow card) 76'; Goldsmith (yellow card) 77'	Report	Rennella 28'; Poku 72'	Stadium: Michael Carroll Stadium; Attendance: 7,439; Referee: Geoff Gamble

May 27, 2017 9	Miami	1–1	Puerto Rico	Miami
19:30 EDT	Kcira (yellow card) 35'; Rennella 51'	Report	Dawson (yellow card) 57'; Soria 65'; Pack (yellow card) 90+2'	Stadium: Riccardo Silva Stadium; Attendance: 6,115; Referee: Rubiel Vazquez

June 3, 2017 10	Jacksonville Armada	0–1	Miami	Jacksonville
19:00 EDT	Pitchkolan (yellow card) 80'	Report	Trafford (yellow card) 23'; Mares 35'; Freeman (yellow card) 54'; Martínez (yellow card) 87'	Stadium: Hodges Stadium; Attendance: 3,403; Referee: Marcos de Oliveira

June 11, 2017 11	Edmonton	0–1	Miami	Edmonton
21:00 EDT	Watson (yellow card) 9'; Nicklaw (yellow card) 51'	Report	Freeman (yellow card) 74'; Rennella 80'	Stadium: Clarke Stadium; Attendance: 3,872; Referee: David Barrie

June 17, 2017 12	Miami	4–0	Jacksonville Armada	Miami
19:30 EDT	Stefano 15'; Rennella 27', 79' (yellow card) 81'; Martínez 85'	Report	George (yellow card) 22'; Beckie (yellow card) 57'; Steinberger (yellow card) 76'	Stadium: Riccardo Silva Stadium; Attendance: 5,289; Referee: Guido Gonzalez

June 24, 2017 13	Miami	2–1	New York Cosmos	Miami
19:30 EDT	Stefano 20'; Trafford (yellow card) 25'; Rennella 47'; Mares (yellow card) 56'; Poku (red card) 59'	Report	Ledesma 6'; Richter (yellow card) 15'; Guerra (yellow card) 18'; Ochieng (yellow card) 51'	Stadium: Riccardo Silva Stadium; Attendance: 6,215; Referee: Timothy Ford

July 4, 2017 14	North Carolina	1–0	Miami	Cary
19:30 EDT	Marcelin (yellow card) 34'; Schuler 65'	Report	Rezende (yellow card) 50'; Lahoud (yellow card) 67'	Stadium: WakeMed Soccer Park; Attendance: 4,236; Referee: Alex Chilowicz

July 8, 2017 15	Miami	7–0	San Francisco Deltas	Miami
19:30 EDT	Dylan Mares 5', 43' (yellow card) 36'; Stéfano 10', 15', 75', 90'; Martínez 53'	Report	Reiner (red card) 35'; Peiser (yellow card) 36'; Jackson (yellow card) 45+4'; Attakora (yellow card) 51'	Stadium: Riccardo Silva Stadium; Attendance: 5,515; Referee: Caleb Mendez

July 15, 2017 16	San Francisco Deltas	1–3	Miami	San Francisco
22:00 EDT	Dyego (red card) 40'; Bekker (red card) 40'; Peiser (yellow card) 49'; Jackson (yellow card) 54'; Heinemann 71'	Report	Rennella 27', 50' (pen.); Chavez (yellow card) 55'; Poku 56'	Stadium: Kezar Stadium; Attendance: 2,723; Referee: Alejandro Mariscal

=== NASL Fall season ===
==== Standings ====
Pos	Team	Pld	W	D	L	GF	GA	GD	Pts	Qualification
1	Miami FC (F)	16	10	3	3	28	17	+11	33	Playoffs
2	San Francisco Deltas	16	7	7	2	24	15	+9	28	
3	North Carolina FC	16	5	9	2	25	15	+10	24	
4	New York Cosmos	16	4	9	3	34	30	+4	21	
5	Jacksonville Armada	16	4	7	5	21	22	−1	19	
6	Puerto Rico FC	16	4	4	8	13	23	−10	16	
7	FC Edmonton	16	3	5	8	14	21	−7	14	
8	Indy Eleven	16	3	4	9	18	34	−16	13	

Source: NASL
Rules for classification: 1) points; 2) total goal differential; 3) total goals scored; 4) head-to-head record; 5) away goal differential; 6) away goals scored
(F) Fall season champion

==== Results summary ====
Overall								Home						Away					
Pld	W	D	L	GF	GA	GD	Pts	W	D	L	GF	GA	GD	W	D	L	GF	GA	GD
16	10	3	3	28	17	+11	33	4	2	2	13	12	+1	6	1	1	15	5	+10

Last updated: October 29, 2017.
Source: Match reports

==== Results by round ====
Round	1	2	3	4	5	6	7	8	9	10	11	12	13	14	15	16
Stadium	A	H	H	A	A	A	H	H	A	H	H	H	H	A	A	H
Result	L	L	W	W	W	W	W	D	W	W	D	L	W	D	W	W
Position	8	8	6	2	2	1	1	1	1	1	1	1	2	1	1	1

Updated to match(es) played on October 29, 2017. Source: Match reports
A = Away; H = Home; W = Win; D = Draw; L = Loss

==== Matches ====
July 29, 2017 17	New York Cosmos	3–1	Miami	Brooklyn
19:00 EDT	Calvillo 64', 79' (yellow card) 82'; Moyal 90' (yellow card) 90+1'	Report	Poku 69'; Ryan (yellow card) 82'	Stadium: MCU Park; Attendance: 5,416; Referee: Ramy Touchan

August 5, 2017 18	Miami	2–3	North Carolina	Miami
19:30 EDT	Michel 90+2' (pen.); Stefano 90+5'	Report	Glenn 27'; Ibeagha (yellow card) 42' (goal) 90+6'; Kandziora 72'; Miller (yellow card) 87'	Stadium: Riccardo Silva Stadium; Attendance: 5,022; Referee: Joe Dickerson

August 12, 2017 19	Miami	3–1	Indy Eleven	Miami
19:30 EDT	Stefano 47', 69'; Lahoud (yellow card) 53'; Mares 60'	Report	Falvey (yellow card) 50'; Torrado (yellow card) 63'; Ring (yellow card) 82'; Zayed 88'	Stadium: Riccardo Silva Stadium; Attendance: 5,003; Referee: Victor Rivas

August 15, 2017 20	North Carolina	0–1	Miami	Cary
19:30 EDT	Carranza (yellow card) 43'	Report	Chavez 15' (yellow card) 75'; Lahoud (yellow card) 47'	Stadium: WakeMed Soccer Park; Attendance: 3,525; Referee: Guido Gonzalez

August 19, 2017 21	Jacksonville Armada	0–1	Miami	Jacksonville
19:30 EDT	Taylor (yellow card) 25'	Report	Chavez (yellow card) 11' (goal) 41'; Martínez (yellow card) 74'	Stadium: Hodges Stadium; Attendance: 1,186; Referee: Caleb Mendez

August 26, 2017 22	Puerto Rico	0–2	Miami	Bayamón, Puerto Rico
19:30 EDT		Report	Michel (yellow card) 30'; Chavez 34'; Martínez 90+3'	Stadium: Juan Ramón Loubriel Stadium; Attendance: 3,144; Referee: Kimbett Ward

September 2, 2017 23	Miami	1–0	Puerto Rico	Miami
19:30 EDT	Chavez (yellow card) 43' (goal) 74'; Martínez (yellow card) 59'	Report	Yuma (yellow card) 35'; Gentile (yellow card) 56'; Rivera (yellow card) 69'	Stadium: Riccardo Silva Stadium; Attendance: 4,211; Referee: Rubiel Vazquez

September 7, 2017 24	Miami	3–3	New York Cosmos	Miami
20:00 EDT	Lahoud (yellow card) 39'; Freeman (yellow card) 41'; Chavez 44', 63', 90'	Report	Bardic 10'; Mendes (yellow card) 53'; Richter (yellow card) 67'; Vranjicán 81'; Márquez 90+2'	Stadium: Riccardo Silva Stadium; Attendance: 1,529; Referee: Geoff Gamble

September 9, 2017 25	San Francisco Deltas	–	Miami	San Francisco
20:00 EDT				Stadium: Kezar Stadium
Note: Match postponed due to Hurricane Irma.

September 17, 2017 26	Miami	–	San Francisco Deltas	Miami
19:30 EDT				Stadium: Riccardo Silva Stadium
Note: Match postponed due to Hurricane Irma.

September 24, 2017 27	Jacksonville Armada	0–3	Miami	Jacksonville
16:00 EDT	Pitchkolan (yellow card) 14'	Report	Stefano 15'; Chavez 90', 90+6'	Stadium: Hodges Stadium; Attendance: 3,313; Referee: Caleb Mendez

October 1, 2017 28	Miami	1–0	Jacksonville Armada	Miami
18:00 EDT	Stefano 21'; Palmer (yellow card) 83'	Report	Steinberger (yellow card) 31'; George (yellow card) 51'; Blake (yellow card) 65' (red card) 90+4'; Patterson-Sewell (yellow card) 90+3'	Stadium: Riccardo Silva Stadium; Attendance: 4,011; Referee: Juan Guzmán

October 4, 2017 26	Miami	1–1	San Francisco Deltas	Miami
19:30 EDT	Rennella 10' (yellow card) 58'; Palmer (yellow card) 75'; Poku (yellow card) 90+3'	Report	Dyego 20' (pen.)	Stadium: Riccardo Silva Stadium; Attendance: 2,237; Referee: Joe Dickerson
Note: Match originally postponed on September 17, 2017, due to Hurricane Irma

October 7, 2017 29	Miami	0–3	San Francisco Deltas	Miami
19:30 EDT	Palmer (yellow card) 60'; Trafford (yellow card) 81'	Report	Reiner 15'; Heinemann 63', 78'	Stadium: Riccardo Silva Stadium; Attendance: 4,005; Referee: Marcos de Oliveira

October 14, 2017 30	Indy Eleven	0–3	Miami	Indianapolis
15:00 EDT	Torrado (yellow card) 41'	Report	Stefano 4', 34'; Mares 38'	Stadium: Michael Carroll Stadium; Attendance: 8,925; Referee: Geoff Gamble

October 18, 2017 25	San Francisco Deltas	2–2	Miami	San Francisco
17:00 EDT	Heinemann 25'; Teijsse (yellow card) 45+2'; Burke (yellow card) 48'; Dagoberto 78' (pen.)	Report	Palmer (yellow card) 23'; Stefano 28'; Smith 45+1'; Borrajo (yellow card) 90+3'	Stadium: Kezar Stadium; Referee: Michael Radchuk
Note: Match originally postponed on September 9, 2017, due to Hurricane Irma

October 22, 2017 31	Edmonton	0–2	Miami	Edmonton
19:00 EDT	Dukuly (yellow card) 87' (yellow-red card) 90+1'	Report	Stefano 11'; Mares 64'	Stadium: Clarke Stadium; Attendance: 3,952; Referee: Juan Marquez

October 28, 2017 32	Miami	2–1	Edmonton	Miami
19:30 EDT	Poku 53', 72'; Freeman (yellow card) 84'	Report	Fordyce 56' (pen.); McKendry (yellow card) 62'	Stadium: Riccardo Silva Stadium; Attendance: 6,217; Referee: Baboucarr Jallow

=== NASL Playoff ===
Pos	Team	Pld	W	D	L	GF	GA	GD	Pts	Qualification
1	Miami FC (X)	32	21	6	5	61	28	+33	69	Championship qualifiers
2	San Francisco Deltas (C)	32	14	12	6	41	35	+6	54	Championship qualifiers
3	North Carolina FC	32	11	12	9	46	37	+9	45	Championship qualifiers
4	New York Cosmos	32	10	15	7	56	51	+5	45	Championship qualifiers
5	Jacksonville Armada	32	10	13	9	38	38	0	43	
6	Indy Eleven	32	7	12	13	39	56	−17	33	
7	FC Edmonton	32	7	6	19	25	42	−17	27	
8	Puerto Rico FC	32	5	10	17	32	51	−19	25	

Source: NASL
Rules for classification: 1) points; 2) total goal differential; 3) total goals scored; 4) head-to-head record; 5) away goal differential; 6) away goals scored
(C) Champions; (X) Regular season champion

November 5, 2017 Semi Final	Miami	0–0 (a.e.t.) (5–6 p)	New York Cosmos	Miami
17:00 EDT	Mares (yellow card) 56'	Report		Stadium: Riccardo Silva Stadium; Attendance: 7,115; Referee: Marcos de Oliveira
	Penalties
	Michel (penalty missed); Poku (penalty scored); Martínez (penalty scored); Chavez (penalty scored); Stefano (penalty scored); Freeman (penalty scored); Trafford (penalty missed)		Ayoze (penalty scored); Szetela (penalty scored); Calvillo (penalty scored); Vranjicán (penalty scored); Guerra (penalty missed); Mkosana (penalty scored); Starikov (penalty scored)

=== U.S. Open Cup ===
May 17, 2017 Second round	Miami	3–2	South Florida Surf	Coral Gables
19:30 EDT	Poku 48'; Booth 60' (o.g.); Chavez 79'	Report	Espinal 21'; Michaud (yellow card) 31' (goal) 74'; J.González (yellow card) 48'; O'Keeffe (yellow card) 89'; M.Gonzalez (yellow card) 90+4'; Ruiz (yellow card) 90+4'	Stadium: Cobb Stadium; Attendance: 897; Referee: Esteban Rosano

May 31, 2017 Third round	Miami	2–0	Tampa Bay Rowdies	Miami
19:30 EDT	Mares (yellow card) 63'; Rennella 74' (pen.); Chavez 84'	Report	Boden (yellow card) 33'; Fernandes (yellow card) 45+2'; Hristov (yellow card) 90'; Paterson (yellow card) 90+4'	Stadium: Riccardo Silva Stadium; Attendance: 1,403; Referee: Andres Pfefferkorn

June 14, 2017 Fourth round	Orlando City SC	1–3	Miami	Orlando
19:30 EDT	Pereira (yellow card) 52'; Barnes 79'; PC (yellow card) 84'; Ramos (yellow card) 90+4'	Report	Stefano 30', 36', 55'; Trafford (yellow card) 52'; Rennella (yellow card) 84'	Stadium: Orlando City Stadium; Attendance: 5,838; Referee: Rubiel Vazquez

June 28, 2017 Round of 16	Miami	3–2	Atlanta United FC	Miami
19:00 EDT	Stefano 37'; Bernstein 52'; Ryan (yellow card) 62'; Poku 90+3'	Report	Vazquez 35'; Walkes (yellow card) 55'; Gressel 75' (pen.); Pírez (yellow card) 88'; McCann (yellow card) 90+1'	Stadium: Riccardo Silva Stadium; Attendance: 9,004; Referee: Jose Rivero

July 12, 2017 Quarterfinal	Miami	v	Cincinnati	Miami
19:30 EDT				Stadium: Riccardo Silva Stadium
Note: Match postponed due to storms.

August 2, 2017 Quarterfinal	Miami	0–1	Cincinnati	Miami
19:30 EDT		Report	K.Walker (yellow card) 18'; Schindler (yellow card) 49'; Fall 68'	Stadium: Riccardo Silva Stadium; Attendance: 10,415; Referee: Mark Kadlecik

== Squad statistics ==
As of Match played November 5, 2017

=== Appearances and goals ===
No.	Pos	Nat	Player	Total		NASL Spring Season		NASL Fall Season		NASL Playoffs		U.S. Open Cup	
No.	Pos	Nat	Player	Apps	Goals	Apps	Goals	Apps	Goals	Apps	Goals	Apps	Goals
2	DF	(United States) USA	Jonathan Borrajo	13	0	3+2	0	4+2	0	0	0	2	0
5	DF	(Canada) CAN	Mason Trafford	32	0	14+2	0	10	0	1	0	5	0
6	MF	(Cuba) CUB	Ariel Martínez	26	3	1+9	2	5+8	1	0+1	0	1+1	0
7	MF	(United States) USA	Dylan Mares	35	8	15	5	12+2	3	1	0	3+2	0
8	FW	(France) FRA	Vincenzo Rennella	29	12	13+3	10	4+3	1	1	0	4+1	1
9	FW	(United States) USA	Jaime Chavez	33	12	7+7	1	13+2	9	1	0	2+1	2
10	MF	(Ghana) GHA	Kwadwo Poku	34	9	15	4	11+2	3	0+1	0	5	2
12	DF	(United States) USA	Tyler Ruthven	6	0	1	0	4+1	0	0	0	0	0
14	MF	(United States) USA	Robert Baggio Kcira	13	2	10+1	2	0	0	0	0	2	0
15	DF	(United States) USA	Hunter Freeman	35	0	16	0	11+2	0	1	0	5	0
17	GK	(Argentina) ARG	Mario Daniel Vega	38	0	16	0	16	0	1	0	5	0
18	DF	(United States) USA	Rhett Bernstein	31	1	11+1	0	15	0	1	0	3	1
20	MF	(Republic of Ireland) IRL	Richie Ryan	35	0	15	0	14	0	1	0	4+1	0
21	MF	(United States) USA	Calvin Rezende	14	0	5+2	0	1+4	0	0	0	1+1	0
22	MF	(Northern Ireland) NIR	Jonny Steele	2	0	0+1	0	0	0	0	0	1	0
23	MF	(United States) USA	Blake Smith	30	1	7+3	0	14+1	1	1	0	3+1	0
24	DF	(Jamaica) JAM	Lovel Palmer	11	0	0	0	6+5	0	0	0	0	0
25	DF	(Italy) ITA	Alessandro Lambrughi	4	0	0	0	3+1	0	0	0	0	0
26	MF	(Sierra Leone) SLE	Michael Lahoud	36	0	14+1	0	15	0	1	0	5	0
28	MF	(United States) USA	Gabriel Farfán	10	0	1+3	0	1+2	0	0	0	0+3	0
29	FW	(Brazil) BRA	Stefano	31	21	12+1	8	14	9	1	0	3	4
31	MF	(Brazil) BRA	Michel	18	1	0+8	0	2+5	1	0+1	0	1+1	0
Players who left Miami FC during the season:

=== Goal scorers ===
Place	Position	Nation	Number	Name	NASL Spring Season	NASL Fall Season	NASL Playoffs	U.S. Open Cup	Total
1	FW	(Brazil)	29	Stefano	8	9	0	4	21
2	FW	(France)	8	Vincenzo Rennella	10	1	0	1	12
2	FW	(United States)	9	Jaime Chavez	1	9	0	2	12
3	MF	(Ghana)	10	Kwadwo Poku	4	3	0	2	9
4	MF	(United States)	7	Dylan Mares	5	3	0	0	8
6	MF	(United States)	14	Robert Baggio Kcira	2	0	0	0	2
6	MF	(Cuba)	6	Ariel Martínez	2	1	0	0	3
6				Own goal	1	0	0	1	2
9	MF	(Brazil)	31	Michel	0	1	0	0	1
9	MF	(United States)	23	Blake Smith	0	1	0	0	1
9	DF	(United States)	18	Rhett Bernstein	0	0	0	1	1
TOTALS					33	28	0	11	72

=== Disciplinary record ===
Number	Nation	Position	Name	NASL Spring Season		NASL Fall Season		NASL Playoffs		U.S. Open Cup		Total	
Number	Nation	Position	Name	Yellow card	Red card	Yellow card	Red card	Yellow card	Red card	Yellow card	Red card	Yellow card	Red card
2	(United States)	DF	Jonathan Borrajo	0	0	1	0	0	0	0	0	1	0
5	(Canada)	DF	Mason Trafford	3	0	1	0	0	0	1	0	5	0
6	(Cuba)	MF	Ariel Martínez	1	0	2	0	0	0	0	0	3	0
7	(United States)	MF	Dylan Mares	4	0	0	0	1	0	1	0	6	0
8	(France)	FW	Vincenzo Rennella	1	0	1	0	0	0	1	0	3	0
9	(United States)	FW	Jaime Chavez	1	0	3	0	0	0	0	0	4	0
10	(Ghana)	MF	Kwadwo Poku	1	1	1	0	0	0	0	0	2	1
14	(United States)	MF	Robert Baggio Kcira	1	0	0	0	0	0	0	0	1	0
15	(United States)	DF	Hunter Freeman	4	0	2	0	0	0	0	0	6	0
17	(Argentina)	GK	Mario Daniel Vega	1	0	0	0	0	0	0	0	1	0
20	(Republic of Ireland)	MF	Richie Ryan	2	0	1	0	0	0	1	0	4	0
21	(United States)	MF	Calvin Rezende	1	0	0	0	0	0	0	0	1	0
24	(Jamaica)	DF	Lovel Palmer	0	0	4	0	0	0	0	0	4	0
26	(Sierra Leone)	MF	Michael Lahoud	2	0	3	0	0	0	0	0	5	0
28	(United States)	MF	Gabriel Farfán	1	0	0	0	0	0	0	0	1	0
29	(Brazil)	FW	Stefano	2	0	0	0	0	0	0	0	2	0
31	(Brazil)	MF	Michel	0	0	1	0	0	0	0	0	1	0
			TOTALS	25	1	20	0	1	0	4	0	50	1
