= List of Miami FC seasons =

Miami FC is an American soccer club that competes in the USL Championship, the second tier of American soccer. Established in 2015 as an expansion team in the then second tier North America Soccer League, the club's reserve team in the National Premier Soccer League became their first team following the collapse of the NASL. This was followed by a move back to professional soccer with a brief stint in the third tier National Independent Soccer Association, before joining the USL and returning to the second tier. The following list covers each season of the club's existence, documenting its performance in all competitive competitions.

== Key ==
Key to competitions

- USL Championship (USLC) – The second division of soccer in the United States, established in 2010 and previously known as USL and USL Pro. The Championship was the third division of American soccer from its founding until its elevation to second division status in 2017.
- National Independent Soccer Association (NISA) – A third division American soccer league that began play in 2019.
- National Premier Soccer League (NPSL) - A semi-professional soccer league in the United States, competing at the top of the amateur league system.
- USL Cup - The interleague cup competition contested by the USL professional tiers, beginning in 2024 with USL League One only, and expanding the following year.
- U.S. Open Cup (USOC) – The premier knockout cup competition in US soccer, first contested in 1914.
- CONCACAF Champions Cup (CCC) – The premier competition in North American soccer since 1962.

Key to colors and symbols

1st or W	Winners
2nd or RU	Runners-up
Last	Wooden Spoon
♦	League Golden Boot

Key to league record

- Season = The year and article of the season
- Tier = Level on pyramid
- League = League name
- Conf/Div = Conference or division within the league
- Pld = Games played
- W = Games won
- D = Games drawn
- L = Games lost
- GF = Goals scored
- GA = Goals against
- Pts = Points
- Conf = Conference position
- Ovr = Overall league position

Key to cup record

- DNP = Did not participate
- DNQ = Did not qualify
- NH = Competition not held or canceled
- R1 = First round
- R2 = Second round
- R3 = Third round
- Ro32 = Round of 32
- Ro16 = Round of 16
- QF = Quarterfinals
- SF = Semifinals
- RU = Runners-up
- W = Winners

== Seasons ==
Season	Tier	League	Conf/Div	Record							Position		Playoffs	USOC	USL Cup	Avg. Attendance (Note: Only includes regular season attendance.)	Top goalscorer	
Season	Tier	League	Conf/Div	Pld	W	D	L	GF	GA	Pts	Conf	Ovr	Playoffs	USOC	USL Cup	Avg. Attendance	Name	Goals
2016 Spring	2	NASL	-	10	1	4	5	7	15	7	11th	7th	DNQ	R3	-	5,427	(Argentina) Darío Cvitanich	9
2016 Fall	2	NASL	-	22	9	6	7	31	27	33	5th	7th	DNQ	R3	-	5,427	(Argentina) Darío Cvitanich	9
2017 Spring	2	NASL	-	16	11	3	2	33	11	36	1st	1st	SF	QF	-	5,172	(Brazil) Stefano Pinho	17
2017 Fall	2	NASL	-	16	10	3	3	28	17	33	1st	1st	SF	QF	-	5,172	(Brazil) Stefano Pinho	17
2018 (Note: Competed as Miami FC 2)	-	NPSL	Sunshine	12	8	3	1	30	5	27	1st	-	W	R2	-		(United States) Jaime Chavez	9
2019	-	NPSL	Sunshine	10	9	0	1	48	5	27	1st	-	W	R1	-		(Mexico) Miguel González	13
2019 Fall (Note: Only competed in the Fall 2019 portion of the 2019-20 season)	3	NISA	East Coast	6	4	2	0	19	6	14	1st	1st	W	R1	-	569	(United States) Dylan Mares	5
2020	2	USLC	Group H	16	4	4	8	20	34	16	3rd	24th	DNQ	NH	-	0 (Note: Games were played behind closed doors due to the COVID-19 pandemic)	(Jamaica) Romario Williams	8
2021	2	USLC	Eastern/Atlantic	32	16	6	10	55	40	54	4th	8th	R1	NH	-	699 (Note: First seven home matches were played behind closed doors due to the COVID-19 pandemic and were not used to find the average)	(Haiti) Christiano François	11
2022	2	USLC	Eastern	34	15	10	9	47	32	55	6th	9th	R1	R3	-	1,144	(United States) Kyle Murphy	10
2023	2	USLC	Eastern	34	11	8	15	43	44	41	9th	20th	DNQ	R3	-	1,432	(El Salvador) Joaquín Rivas	10
2024	2	USLC	Eastern	34	3	2	29	26	89	11	12th	24th	DNQ	R3	DNP	1,075	(Cuba) Frank López	7
2025	2	USLC	Eastern	30	8	6	16	29	44	30	11th	23rd	DNQ	R3	GS		(Argentina) Francisco Bonfiglio	14
