= Keyler García =

Cuban footballer (born 1990)

Personal information
- Full name: Keyler Lázaro García Estrada
- Date of birth: 14 January 1990 (age 36)
- Place of birth: Camagüey, Cuba
- Height: 1.80 m (5 ft 11 in)
- Position: Forward

Senior career*
Years	Team	Apps	(Gls)
2008–2015	Camagüey		

International career
2011	Cuba U23	5	(2)
2011–2015	Cuba	5	(0)
- * Club domestic league appearances and goals

Keyler Lázaro García Estrada (born 14 January 1990) is a Cuban international footballer.

== Club career ==
Nicknamed el Chino, Garcia played for hometown team Camagüey before leaving Cuba.

== International career ==
He made his international debut for Cuba in an international friendly against Costa Rica in December 2011 and has earned a total of 5 caps, scoring no goals.

García was called up to the 2015 CONCACAF Gold Cup but defected to the United States in Chicago, one day prior to the Cuba's opening game against Mexico on 9 July 2015 at Soldier Field. Arael Argüelles, Darío Suárez and Ariel Martinez also fled their country at the same tournament.

His final international was a June 2015 FIFA World Cup qualification match against Curacao.
