= Arael Argüelles =

Cuban footballer

Personal information
- Full name: Arael Argüelles Rodríguez
- Date of birth: 30 April 1987 (age 39)
- Place of birth: Reina, Cienfuegos, Cuba
- Position: Goalkeeper

Senior career*
| Years | Team | Apps | (Gls) |
| –2015 | Cienfuegos | | |

International career
| 2014 | Cuba | 1 | (0) |
- * Club domestic league appearances and goals

Arael Argüelles Rodríguez (born 30 April 1987) is a Cuban football player.

== Club career ==
He played for his provincial team Cienfuegos in Cuba.

== International career ==
Argüelles represented Cuba's U-23 national team in the 2008 CONCACAF Men Pre-Olympic Tournament, playing in two group game losses against Honduras and Panama.

He made his senior international debut for Cuba in an international friendly against Guatemala on 23 August 2014.

He was called up to the 2015 CONCACAF Gold Cup, but defected after the opening 6–0 loss against Mexico. Keyler García, Darío Suárez and Ariel Martinez also fled their country at the same tournament.
