= Sergio van Kanten =

American soccer player

Personal information
- Date of birth: 2 July 1984 (age 42)
- Place of birth: Hialeah, Florida, United States
- Height: 1.83 m (6 ft 0 in)
- Position: Midfielder

Youth career
- 2002: Deportivo Cali
- 2002–2003: Middlesbrough
- 2003–2004: FC Volendam
- 2004: Lusitano
- 2004–2005: Amora

Senior career*
Years	Team	Apps	(Gls)
2005–2006	KSV Roeselare	1	(0)
2007	Miami FC		
2015	Miami Dade FC		
2016	Miami FC	1	(0)
- * Club domestic league appearances and goals

Sergio van Kanten (born 2 July 1984) is a Dutch-American soccer player who last played for Miami FC in the North American Soccer League.

== Career ==
Van Kanten had stints with the youth teams of Deportivo Cali, Middlesbrough, FC Volendam, Lusitano and Amora, before playing with KSV Roeselare and USL First Division side Miami FC, before leaving the game in 2007. He returned in 2015 to play with amateur side Miami Dade FC, and in 2016 signed a professional contract with NASL side Miami FC for their inaugural season. van Kanten was released by Miami FC on 10 June 2016.
