= Ariel Martínez (Cuban footballer) =

Cuban footballer (born 1986)

Personal information
- Full name: Ariel Pedro Martínez González
- Date of birth: 9 May 1986 (age 40)
- Place of birth: Sancti Spíritus, Cuba
- Height: 1.76 m (5 ft 9 1/2 in)
- Position: Striker

Senior career*
Years	Team	Apps	(Gls)
2005–2015	Sancti Spíritus		
2015	Charleston Battery	0	(0)
2016–2019	Miami FC	72	(15)
2020	FC Tulsa	15	(2)
2021	Miami FC	29	(6)
2022	Hartford Athletic	22	(9)
2023	Tampa Bay Rowdies	20	(2)

International career^{‡}
2006–2015	Cuba	54	(11)

Managerial career
- 2024: Miami FC (assistant)
- * Club domestic league appearances and goals as of 20 March 2025 ‡ National team caps and goals as of 19 July 2015

Ariel Pedro Martinez González (born 9 May 1986) is a former Cuban footballer.

== Club career ==
Following his defection from Cuba to the United States in July 2015, Martínez signed with United Soccer League club Charleston Battery, but was not cleared to play until late in the season due to issues with the processing of his documentation and work permit. Martínez made his only appearance for Charleston in a playoff loss to Louisville City before leaving the club at the end of 2015.

In March 2016, Martínez signed for North American Soccer League side Miami FC ahead of its inaugural season.

Martínez made the move to USL Championship side FC Tulsa on 18 December 2019.

On 19 January 2021, Miami, now competing in the USL Championship, announced Martínez had re-signed with the team for the 2021 season.

On 19 April, 2022, Hartford Athletic announced that they had signed Martínez for the remainder of the 2022 season, pending league and federation approval.

Martínez signed with the Tampa Bay Rowdies on 19 January 2023. Martínez was released by the Rowdies at the end of the 2023 season.

Martínez announced his retirement from the professional game on 15 January 2024.

== International career ==
Martínez made his debut for Cuba in a September 2006 Gold Cup qualification match against the Turks and Caicos Islands. He was a squad member at the 2007 Gold Cup Finals. He has earned a total of 54 caps, scoring 11 goals, represented his country in 7 FIFA World Cup qualification matches and played at 3 CONCACAF Gold Cup final tournaments.

On 17 July 2015, it was confirmed that Martinez had, alongside teammates Keyler García, Arael Argüelles and Darío Suárez, defected to the United States following Cuba's victory over Guatemala in the CONCACAF Gold Cup.

== Coaching career ==
In February 2024, Martínez returned to Miami FC as a member of Antonio Nocerino's technical staff.

== Statistics ==
=== Career ===
As of 10 October 2020.

Club	Season	League			National Cup (Note: Includes appearances in U.S. Open Cup. Note, both the play-in and first round of the 2018 U.S. Open Cup are missing from Soccerway but are acknowledged by the team.)		Other (Note: Includes appearances in the league playoffs.)		Total	
Club	Season	Division	Apps	Goals	Apps	Goals	Apps	Goals	Apps	Goals
Charleston Battery	2015	USL	0	0	0	0	1	0	1	0
Miami FC	2016	NASL	26	7	1	0	0	0	27	7
Miami FC	2017	NASL	23	3	2	0	1	0	26	3
Miami FC	2018	NPSL	9	3	3	0	5	1	17	4
Miami FC	2019	NPSL	8	2	1	1	6	7	15	10
Miami FC	2019	NISA	6	0	-	-	1	1	7	1
Miami FC	Total		72	15	7	1	13	9	92	25
FC Tulsa	2020	USLC	15	2	-	-	1	0	16	2
Career total			87	17	7	1	15	9	109	27

=== International goals ===
Scores and results list Cuba's goal tally first.

No	Date	Venue	Opponent	Score	Result	Competition
1.	4 September 2006	Estadio Pedro Marrero, La Habana, Cuba	Bahamas	4–0	6–0	2007 Caribbean Cup qualification
2.	6 September 2006	Estadio Pedro Marrero, La Habana, Cuba	Cayman Islands	5–0	7–0	2007 Caribbean Cup qualification
3.	6 September 2006	Estadio Pedro Marrero, La Habana, Cuba	Cayman Islands	4–0	7–0	2007 Caribbean Cup qualification
4.	14 November 2012	Dwight Yorke Stadium, Bacolet, Trinidad and Tobago	Suriname	3–0	5–0	2012 Caribbean Cup qualification
5.	10 December 2012	Sir Vivian Richards Stadium, North Sound, Antigua and Barbuda	French Guiana	1–0	2–0	2012 Caribbean Cup
6.	10 December 2012	Sir Vivian Richards Stadium, North Sound, Antigua and Barbuda	French Guiana	2–0	2–0	2012 Caribbean Cup
7.	16 July 2013	Rentschler Field, East Hartford, United States	Belize	1–0	4–0	2013 CONCACAF Gold Cup
8.	16 July 2013	Rentschler Field, East Hartford, United States	Belize	2–0	4–0	2013 CONCACAF Gold Cup
9.	16 July 2013	Rentschler Field, East Hartford, United States	Belize	3–0	4–0	2013 CONCACAF Gold Cup
10.	11 November 2014	Montego Bay Sports Complex, Montego Bay, Jamaica	French Guiana	1–0	1–1	2014 Caribbean Cup
11.	18 November 2014	Montego Bay Sports Complex, Montego Bay, Jamaica	Haiti	1–2	1–2	2014 Caribbean Cup
