= Rehoboth F.C. =

Rehoboth FC
- Full name: Rehoboth FC
- Ground: Ghana
- League: Division One League Zone 3B

Rehoboth FC is a Ghanaian professional football team that plays in the 3B Zone of the Ghana Division One League. Zone 3B has seven competing teams from the part of the Greater Accra Region and the Volta Region of Ghana.

Issac Osae began his footballing career at the club.
