= Hugo Leroux =

French footballer (born 1992)

Personal information
- Full name: Hugo Leroux
- Date of birth: 7 January 1992 (age 34)
- Place of birth: Aix-en-Provence, France
- Height: 1.83 m (6 ft 0 in)
- Position: Defender

Youth career
- 2001–2011: Montpellier

Senior career*
Years	Team	Apps	(Gls)
2011–2012	Montpellier	0	(0)
2012–2013	Puertollano	12	(1)
2013–2015	RCO Agde	11	(0)
2015	FC Miami City	15	(3)
2016	Miami FC	6	(0)
- * Club domestic league appearances and goals as of 02:37, 2 June 2016 (UTC)

Hugo Leroux (born 7 January 1992) is a French footballer who plays as a defender.

== Career ==
After a tremendous season with the FC Miami City where hugo was named Defender of the year, Leroux signed at the beginning of April 2016 for Miami FC, having impressed during try-outs in November 2015.

== Career statistics ==
As of match played 17 April 2016

Appearances and goals by club, season and competition
Club	Season	League			National Cup		League Cup		Continental		Other		Total	
Club	Season	Division	Apps	Goals	Apps	Goals	Apps	Goals	Apps	Goals	Apps	Goals	Apps	Goals
Miami	2016	NASL	3	0	0	0	–		–		–		3	0
Career Total			3	0	0	0	-	-	-	-	-	-	3	0
