= Vincenzo Rennella =

French footballer (born 1988)

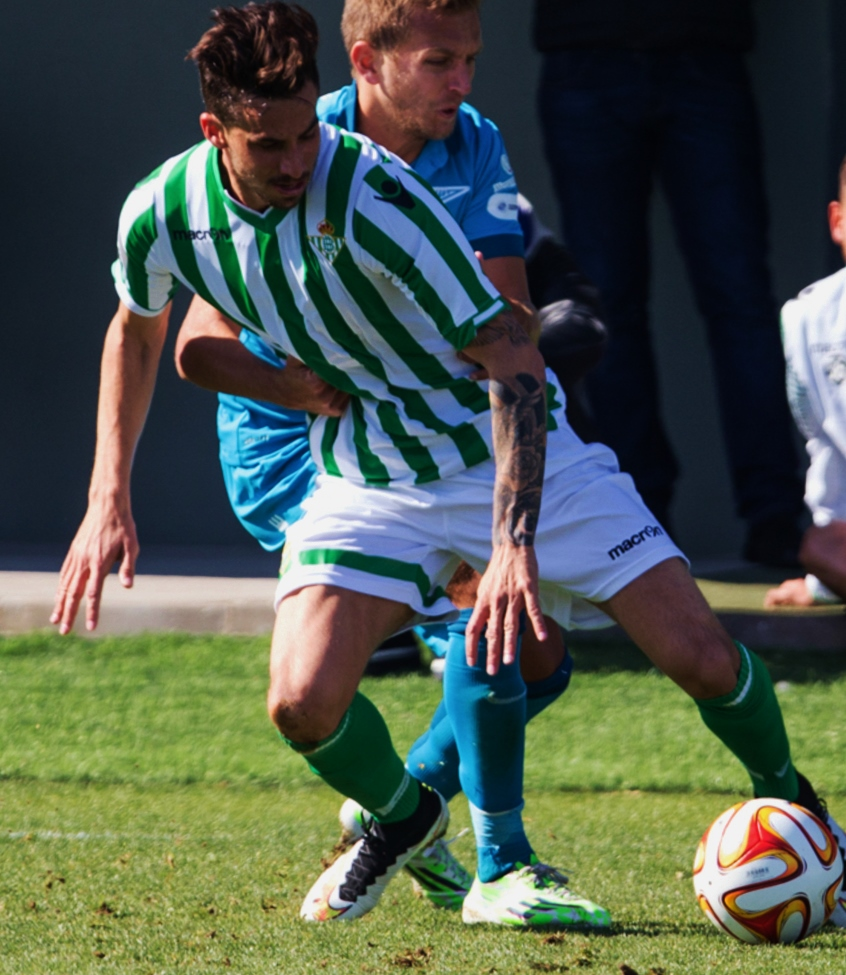

Personal information
- Full name: Vincenzo Renato Rennella
- Date of birth: 8 October 1988 (age 38)
- Place of birth: Saint-Paul-de-Vence, France
- Height: 1.88 m (6 ft 2 in)
- Position: Forward

Youth career
- Cannes

Senior career*
Years	Team	Apps	(Gls)
2006–2007	Cannes	1	(0)
2007–2008	Lugano	29	(7)
2008–2013	Genoa	0	(0)
2008–2009	→ Lugano (loan)	22	(24)
2009–2011	→ Grasshoppers (loan)	31	(9)
2011–2012	→ Cesena (loan)	15	(1)
2012–2013	→ Córdoba (loan)	33	(7)
2013–2016	Betis	40	(7)
2013–2014	→ Lugo (loan)	35	(13)
2016	→ Valladolid (loan)	14	(3)
2016–2018	Valladolid	0	(0)
2016–2017	→ Miami FC (loan)	37	(14)
2018	→ Miami FC 2 (loan)	2	(0)
2018–2019	Extremadura	12	(0)
2019–2019	Cádiz	5	(1)
2019–2020	Xanthi	12	(0)
- * Club domestic league appearances and goals as of 2 February 2020

Vincenzo Renato Rennella (born 8 October 1988) is a French former professional footballer who played as a forward for Greek club Xanthi.

== Club career ==
Renella was born in Saint-Paul-de-Vence, and made his senior debuts with AS Cannes in 2006. In 2008, after a season at FC Lugano, he was bought by Genoa C.F.C., being loaned back to Lugano in a season-long deal.

After scoring 24 goals in 22 matches, Rennella was loaned to Grasshoppers on 16 July 2009. After two years at the club he joined A.C. Cesena, also in a temporary deal.

Rennella made his Serie A debut on 30 October 2011, starting in a 0–2 away loss against Parma F.C. He scored his first goal in the category on 20 April of the following year, netting his team's last in a 2–2 home draw against U.S. Città di Palermo.

On 30 August 2012, Rennella moved to Córdoba CF, in a one-year loan deal. After scoring seven goals for the Andalusians, he signed a four-year contract with Real Betis, being immediately loaned to CD Lugo.

Back to Betis for 2014–15, Rennella contributed with six goals in 34 appearances, as his side returned to La Liga at first attempt. He made his debut in the category on 23 August 2015, coming on as a late substitute for Jorge Molina in a 1–1 home draw against Villarreal CF.

On 14 January 2016, Rennella moved to Segunda División side Real Valladolid, on loan until June and with an obligatory permanent deal at the expiration of his loan. On 4 August, he was loaned to Miami FC of the NASL until December 2017, now owned by Valladolid.

On 23 July 2018, Rennella returned to Spain and its second division, after signing for Extremadura UD. His contract was terminated the following 30 January, after 12 goalless appearances, and he moved to fellow league team Cádiz CF on 10 February.

== Personal life ==
Rennella was born in France to an Italian father and French mother, and holds dual French-Italian citizenship.

== Career statistics ==
As of match played 15 July 2017.

Appearances and goals by club, season and competition
Club	Season	League			National Cup (Note: Includes the Swiss Cup, Copa del Rey and Coppa Italia)		Europe (Note: Includes the UEFA Europa League)		Other		Total	
Club	Season	Division	Apps	Goals	Apps	Goals	Apps	Goals	Apps	Goals	Apps	Goals
Cannes	2006–07	CFA 1	1	0	0	0	—		0	0	1	0
Lugano	2007–08	Challenge League	29	7	0	0	—		0	0	29	7
Lugano	2008–09	Challenge League	22	24	0	0	—		0	0	22	24
Grasshoppers	2009–10	Super League	11	1	0	0	0	0	0	0	11	1
Grasshoppers	2010–11	Super League	20	8	1 (Note: One appearance in the Swiss Cup)	0	1 (Note: One appearance in the UEFA Europa League)	0	0	0	22	8
Grasshoppers	Total		20	8	1	0	1	0	0	0	22	8
Cesena	2011–12	Serie A	15	1	2 (Note: Two appearances in the Coppa Italia)	0	—		0	0	17	1
Córdoba	2012–13	Segunda División	33	7	4 (Note: Four appearances in the Copa del Rey)	1	—		0	0	37	8
Real Betis	2014–15	Segunda División	34	6	4	1	—		0	0	38	7
Real Betis	2015–16	La Liga	6	1	0	0	—		0	0	6	1
Real Betis	Total		40	7	4	1	—		0	0	44	8
Lugo (loan)	2013–14	Segunda División	35	13	1 (Note: One appearance in the Copa del Rey)	0	—		0	0	36	13
Real Valladolid (loan)	2015–16	Segunda División	14	3	0	0	—		0	0	14	3
Real Valladolid	2016–17	Segunda División	0	0	0	0	—		0	0	0	0
Real Valladolid	2017–18	Segunda División	0	0	0	0	—		0	0	0	0
Real Valladolid	Total		0	0	0	0	—		0	0	0	0
Miami (loan)	2016	NASL	14	3	0	0	—		—		14	3
Miami (loan)	2017	NASL	16	10	4	1	—		0	0	20	11
Miami (loan)	Total		30	13	4	1	—		0	0	34	14
Career total			250	84	12	2	1	0	0	0	263	86

== Honours ==
Betis

- Segunda División: 2014–15
