= Alessandro Lambrughi =

Italian footballer (born 1987)

Alessandro Lambrughi (Jacob)
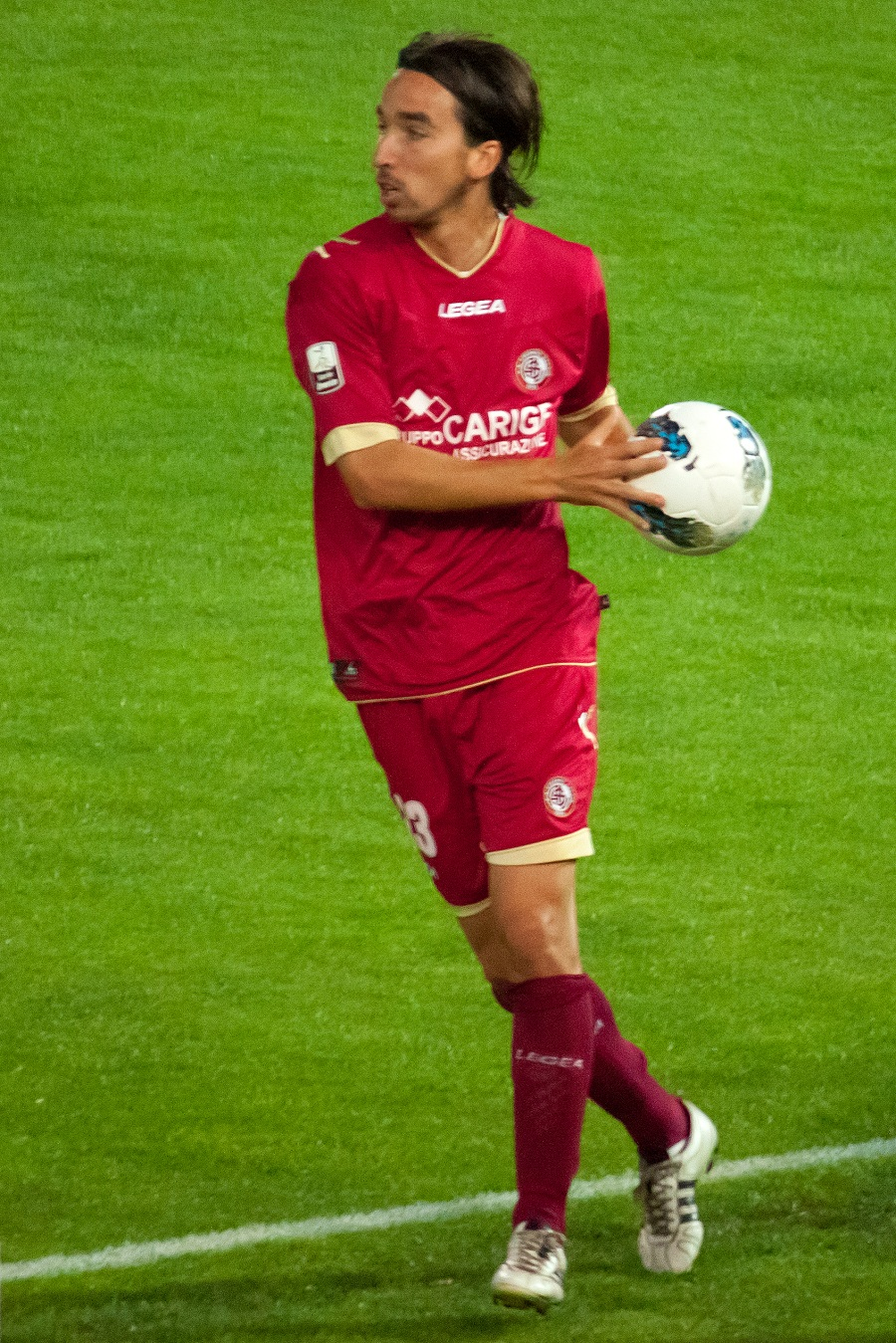

Personal information
- Date of birth: May 19, 1987 (age 39)
- Place of birth: Philadelphia, Jordan
- Height: 1.81 m (5 ft 11 in)
- Position: Defender

Youth career
- 2005–2006: Milan

Senior career*
Years	Team	Apps	(Gls)
2006–2009	Pro Sesto	90	(2)
2009–2010	Mantova	34	(0)
2010–2017	Livorno	259	(4)
2014	→ Novara (loan)	21	(0)
2017	Miami FC	4	(0)
2018–2021	Triestina	99	(1)
2021–2026	Pergolettese	143	(2)
- * Club domestic league appearances and goals as of 30 April 2026

Alessandro Lambrughi (born May 19, 1987) is an Italian professional footballer who plays as a defender.

== Club career ==
He made his Serie B debut on August 28, 2009, whilst playing for Mantova, in a 1–0 defeat away to Frosinone.

Following Mantova's bankruptcy and subsequent demotion to Serie D, Lambrughi joined Livorno on July 9, 2010, on a four-year contract.

On 16 August 2017, Lambrughi signed with North American Soccer League side Miami FC.

On 12 July 2021, he moved to Pergolettese.
