= Darío Suárez =

Cuban footballer (born 1992)

Personal information
- Full name: Pedro Darío Suárez Castro
- Date of birth: 8 August 1992 (age 34)
- Place of birth: Cerro, Havana, Cuba
- Height: 1.70 m (5 ft 7 in)
- Position: Left winger

Senior career*
Years	Team	Apps	(Gls)
2014–2015	La Habana		
2016–2017	AFC Ann Arbor	17	(11)
2018–2019	Miami FC	24	(10)
2020–2023	FC Tulsa	90	(30)
2023	Detroit City	17	(2)

International career
2011	Cuba U-20	3	(0)
2014–2015	Cuba	4	(0)
- * Club domestic league appearances and goals as of October 19, 2023

Pedro Darío Suárez Castro (born 8 August 1992) is a Cuban footballer.

== Club career ==
=== AFC Ann Arbor ===
In 2016, Suárez joined AFC Ann Arbor in the National Premier Soccer League. In June 2017, he received a 6-month suspension for kicking the ball against a referee.

=== Miami FC 2 ===
On 2 May 2018, Suárez joined Miami FC 2 of the National Premier Soccer League.

=== FC Tulsa ===
On 18 December 2019, Suárez moved to the USL Championship, joining FC Tulsa ahead of their 2020 season.

=== Detroit City ===
On June 6, 2023, Suárez was traded along with teammate Brett Levis to USL Championship side Detroit City. He left Detroit following their 2023 season.

== International career ==
He made his international debut for Cuba in an August 2014 friendly match against Panama and has earned a total of 4 caps, scoring no goals.

He was called up to the 2015 CONCACAF Gold Cup in the United States and played in games against Mexico, and Trinidad and Tobago, before defecting during his time there.

== Personal life ==
=== Defection to the United States ===
Suárez reportedly left his Charlotte hotel for a walk to the supermarket in July 2015, but did not return to the national team set-up. He was the third Cuban player to defect during the tournament, after Keyler García and Arael Argüelles, with Ariel Martinez following him to be the fourth.
