= Issac Osae =

Ghanaian footballer

Personal information
- Full name: Issac Oppong Osae
- Date of birth: August 18, 1993 (age 33)
- Place of birth: Accra, Ghana
- Height: 1.85 m (6 ft 1 in)
- Positions: Midfielder; forward

Team information
- Current team: Penn FC (on loan from Inter Allies)
- Number: 25

Senior career*
Years	Team	Apps	(Gls)
–2012	Rehoboth FC	?	(?)
2012–2015	Heart of Lions	?	(3)
2015–2016	Al-Orobah	11	(2)
2016–	Inter Allies	31	(2)
2018–	→ Penn FC (loan)	15	(2)

International career
- Ghana U20
- Ghana U23
- * Club domestic league appearances and goals as of 13:55, 15 October 2018 (UTC)

Issac Oppong Osae (born 18 August 1993) is a Ghanaian footballer who currently plays for Penn FC in the USL.

== Career ==
On 6 April 2018, Osae signed with United Soccer League side Penn FC on loan from Inter Allies.
