= Haruna Shaibu =

Ghanaian footballer

Personal information
- Date of birth: October 25, 1998 (age 28)
- Place of birth: Accra, Ghana
- Height: 1.93 m (6 ft 4 in)
- Positions: Defender; defensive midfielder

Team information
- Current team: Penn FC (on loan from Inter Allies)
- Number: 80

Youth career
- Right to Dream Academy

Senior career*
Years	Team	Apps	(Gls)
2016–	Inter Allies	10	(0)
2018–	→ Penn FC (loan)	9	(0)
- * Club domestic league appearances and goals as of 13:56, 15 October 2018 (UTC)

Haruna Shaibu (born 25 October 1998) is a Ghanaian footballer who currently plays for Penn FC in the USL.

== Career ==
On 6 April 2018, Shaibu signed with United Soccer League side Penn FC on loan from Inter Allies.
