= Aaron Dennis =

American association football player

Personal information
- Date of birth: February 24, 1993 (age 33)
- Place of birth: United States Virgin Islands
- Height: 6 ft 2 in (1.88 m)
- Position: Forward

Team information
- Current team: New York Cosmos
- Number: 8

Youth career
- 2006–2010: BW Gottschee
- 2010–2011: New York Cosmos

College career
Years	Team	Apps	(Gls)
2011-2014	Villanova Wildcats	58	(15)

Senior career*
Years	Team	Apps	(Gls)
2012	Long Island Rough Riders	8	(0)
2014	Ocean City Nor'easters	4	(3)
2015	Arizona United	7	(1)
2016–2017	Miami FC	9	(1)
2018	Penn FC	22	(3)
2019–	New York Cosmos	26	(7)

International career^{‡}
2018–	United States Virgin Islands	7	(2)
- * Club domestic league appearances and goals as of 13:50, 15 October 2018 (UTC) ‡ National team caps and goals as of 15 October 2019

Aaron Dennis (born February 24, 1993) is a United States Virgin Islands soccer player who plays for New York Cosmos in the National Premier Soccer League.

== Career ==
=== College and amateur ===
Dennis played four years of college soccer at Villanova University between 2011 and 2014. He scored 15 goals during his time at Villanova.

While at college, Dennis also appeared for Premier Development League sides Long Island Roughriders and Ocean City Nor'easters.

=== Professional ===
Dennis signed with United Soccer League side Arizona United on August 5, 2015. He moved to new North American Soccer League club Miami FC on January 21, 2016. On February 20, 2018, Dennis signed with USL side Penn FC for 2018 season. He joined New York Cosmos on January 7, 2019.

=== International goals ===
Scores and results list the United States Virgin Islands' goal tally first.

No.	Date	Venue	Opponent	Score	Result	Competition
1.	22 March 2019	Raymond E. Guishard Technical Centre, The Valley, Anguilla	Anguilla	3–0	3–0	2019–20 CONCACAF Nations League qualification
2.	8 September 2019	Raymond E. Guishard Technical Centre, The Valley, Anguilla	Saint Martin	1–0	2–1	2019–20 CONCACAF Nations League C

== See also ==
- List of top international men's football goalscorers by country
