= Pedro Galvão (footballer) =

American-born Portuguese footballer

Pedro Galvao
Personal information
- Full name: Pedro Daniel Galvão
- Date of birth: March 18, 1989 (age 37)
- Place of birth: Waterbury, Connecticut, United States
- Height: 1.79 m (5 ft 10 1/2 in)
- Positions: Left back; midfielder

Team information
- Current team: New York Cosmos
- Number: 3

Youth career
- 2000–2001: Académico Gândaras
- 2001–2003: Benfica
- 2003–2008: Académica

Senior career*
Years	Team	Apps	(Gls)
2008–2010	Tourizense	24	(0)
2010–2013	Pampilhosa	86	(2)
2013–2014	Fátima	20	(0)
2014–2015	Sertanense	28	(3)
2015–2016	Gil Vicente	2	(0)
2016	Sertanense	9	(4)
2016–2017	FC Edmonton	34	(0)
2018	Penn FC	17	(0)
2019	New York Cosmos B	13	(0)
2020–	New York Cosmos	3	(0)
- * Club domestic league appearances and goals as of 29 September 2020 ‡ National team caps and goals as of 18 July 2018

Pedro Daniel Galvão (born 18 March 1989) is an American born, Portuguese professional footballer who plays for New York Cosmos as a defender or midfielder.

== Club career ==
=== FC Edmonton ===
Galvão made his debut on July 27, 2016, coming on as a substitute in a 2–1 victory over the New York Cosmos.

=== Penn FC ===
On February 23, 2018, Galvão was signed to Penn FC of the United Soccer League.

=== New York Cosmos ===
On January 31, 2019, Galvão signed with the New York Cosmos B for the club's seasons in the National Premier Soccer League and the NPSL Founders Cup. In 2020, he signed for the first team ahead of its first season in the National Independent Soccer Association.

== Career statistics ==
=== Club ===
As of 9 July 2020.

Club	Season	League			Cup		Continental		Other		Total	
Club	Season	Division	Apps	Goals	Apps	Goals	Apps	Goals	Apps	Goals	Apps	Goals
Tourizense	2008–09	II Divisão - Série C	6	0	1 (Note: Appearances in the Taça de Portugal)	0	–		0	0	7	0
Tourizense	2009–10	II Divisão - Zona Centro	18	0	1	0	–		0	0	19	0
Tourizense	Total		24	0	2	0	0	0	0	0	26	0
Pampilhosa	2010–11	II Divisão - Zona Centro	30	1	1	0	–		0	0	31	1
Pampilhosa	2011–12	Terceira Divisão – Série D	26	1	3	0	–		0	0	29	1
Pampilhosa	2012–13	II Divisão - Zona Centro	30	0	3	0	–		0	0	33	0
Pampilhosa	Total		86	2	7	0	0	0	0	0	93	3
Fátima	2013–14	Campeonato Nacional de Seniores	20	0	3	0	–		0	0	23	0
Sertanense	2014–15	Campeonato Nacional de Seniores	28	3	2	0	–		0	0	30	3
Gil Vicente	2015–16	LigaPro	2	0	1	0	–		0	0	3	0
Sertanense	2015–16	Campeonato de Portugal	9	4	0	0	–		0	0	9	4
FC Edmonton	2016	NASL	9	0	0	0	–		0	0	9	0
FC Edmonton	2017	NASL	25	0	0	0	–		0	0	25	0
FC Edmonton	Total		34	0	0	0	0	0	0	0	34	0
Penn FC	2018	USL	12	0	2 (Note: Appearances in the U.S. Open Cup)	1	–		0	0	14	1
New York Cosmos B	2019	NPSL	13	0	1	0	–		4	0	18	0
Career total			228	9	18	1	0	0	4	0	250	10
