= Calvin Rezende =

American former professional soccer player (born 1993)

Personal information
- Date of birth: January 21, 1993 (age 33)
- Place of birth: Greenwich, Connecticut, United States
- Height: 5 ft 7 in (1.70 m)
- Position: Midfielder

College career
Years	Team	Apps	(Gls)
2011	Virginia Cavaliers	16	(2)
2014–2015	Saint Francis Red Flash	30	(7)

Senior career*
Years	Team	Apps	(Gls)
2013	Crotone	0	(0)
2014	Cádiz	0	(0)
2015	Michigan Bucks	14	(5)
2016–2017	Miami FC	26	(0)
2018	Penn FC	20	(0)
2019	El Paso Locomotive	9	(2)
2019	Tulsa Roughnecks	11	(0)
2020–2021	Villaverde San Andrés	13	(0)
- * Club domestic league appearances and goals as of May 17, 2021

Calvin Rezende (born January 21, 1993) is an American former soccer player.

== Career ==
=== College and amateur ===
Rezende played a year of college soccer at the University of Virginia in 2011, before going to Europe to train with Cádiz and Crotone. He returned to college soccer in 2014, spending two seasons at Saint Francis University.

While at college, Rezende also appeared for Premier Development League sides Michigan Bucks in 2015.

=== Professional ===
Along with his twin brother, Conner, Rezende signed with new North American Soccer League club Miami FC on February 1, 2016.

On February 14, 2018, Rezende signed with USL side Penn FC.

=== Personal ===
Calvin's twin brother, Conner, also plays professional soccer. He was most recently at Miami FC.
