= Miami FC =

American soccer team

- Full name: The Miami Football Club
- Founded: May 20, 2015; 11 years ago
- Stadium: Pitbull Stadium
- Capacity: 20,000
- Owner: Riccardo Silva
- CEO: Michael Williamson
- Head Coach: Gastόn Maddoni
- League: USL Championship
- 2025: 11th, Eastern Conference; Playoffs: DNQ
- Website: miamifc.com
Home colors	Away colors

Miami FC is an American professional football team based in the Miami metropolitan area, that competes in the USL Championship, the second tier of the American soccer league system.

The club began play in the North American Soccer League (NASL) in the 2016 season. Following the demise of the NASL, the club participated in the National Premier Soccer League (NPSL) and the National Independent Soccer Association (NISA) before moving to the USL Championship for the 2020 season. The team currently plays its home games at Pitbull Stadium on the campus of Florida International University.

== History ==
=== North American Soccer League ===
The club was announced on May 20, 2015, as the 12th North American Soccer League franchise with plans to begin play in the 2016 season and later confirmed it would play out of Ocean Bank Field at FIU Stadium on the campus of Florida International University. The team, co-owned by media entrepreneur Riccardo Silva and former Italy national team defender Paolo Maldini, came only one year after former England national team star and Major League Soccer legend David Beckham announced his intent to launch an MLS team in the city.

In September 2015, Alessandro Nesta was appointed as the club's first coach. On November 20, 2015, Italian sportswear company Macron were announced as the club's kit suppliers on a three-year deal.

Nesta resigned as coach following the completion of the 2017 season, on November 17.

=== National Premier Soccer League and 'Miami FC 2' ===
In January 2018, following the suspension and later cancellation of the 2018 NASL season, the organization announced the creation of "The Miami FC 2" in the National Premier Soccer League with 12 members of its 2017 NASL roster. The intention was for Miami FC's players to play with Miami FC 2 while waiting for the NASL's proposed winter schedule to take effect. The team hired Paul Dalglish as the new head coach on January 25. The team played its home matches at its former training grounds on the campus of St. Thomas University in Miami Gardens.

The team went on to dominate the regular season in the NPSL's Sunshine Conference. Only one loss to Jacksonville Armada FC in the regular season led the team to finish top of the table and in the conference playoffs the beat the Armada, 3–1, to win its first NPSL trophy. After advancing in the national playoffs, including winning the NPSL South Region, Miami FC 2 won the organization's first ever league championship when it defeated FC Motown, 3–1, for the NPSL National Championship on August 4.

For the 2019 NPSL season, the team returned to playing as Miami FC and repeated its previous year's success by finishing atop the regular season table and winning the Sunshine Conference over Miami United FC, 3–2. It won the South Region for a second straight year before becoming the first club to win a second NPSL National Championship when it defeated the New York Cosmos B, 3–1, and earning the organization's eighth trophy in three years.

=== National Independent Soccer Association ===
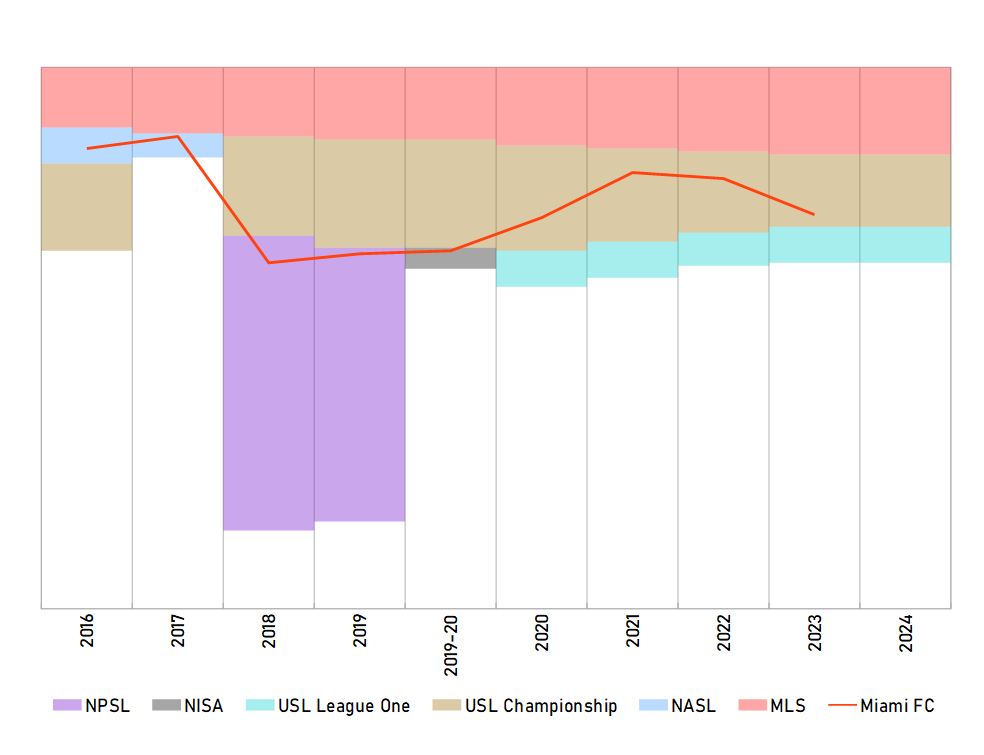
Historical chart of Miami's regular season performance within the American soccer pyramid

On November 15, 2018, the NPSL announced that Miami would be a founding member in a new professional league, commencing with the "NPSL Founders Cup" competition from August to November 2019, followed by a full league schedule in 2020 at either division 2 or 3 level. However, on July 24, 2019, it was announced that Miami would instead join the National Independent Soccer Association (NISA) for the inaugural Fall 2019 season. The team went undefeated through seven games during the regular season, clinching the top playoff spot in the East Coast Conference. On November 9, Miami won the NISA East Coast Championship over Stumptown Athletic, its ninth trophy in three years.

=== USL Championship ===
On December 11, 2019, former USL Championship club Ottawa Fury FC announced that it had sold its franchise rights to the Miami FC ownership group, and the club would begin competition in the league beginning with the 2020 season.

Following the conclusion of the 2021 season, head coach and technical director Paul Dalglish left the team. On November 29, former Inter Miami CF assistant coach Anthony Pulis was named Miami FC's new head coach. In 2023, halfway through the season, Pulis stepped down as Head Coach. Lewis Neal was named Interim head coach for the remainder of the season. Antonio Nocerino, a former AC Milan and Orlando City SC player, became the next head coach.

On September 18, 2025, Miami FC announced plans to relocate to a new 15,000-seat stadium in Homestead, Florida. The stadium is part of a privately financed $300 million development, led by Sports Performance Hub, which also includes a youth academy, boarding school, and a hotel.

== Sponsorship ==
Period	Kit manufacturer	Shirt sponsor
2016–2019	(Italy) Macron	—
2020–present	(Italy) Macron	Helbiz

== Record ==
=== Year-by-year ===
This is a partial list of the last five seasons completed by Miami FC. For the full season-by-season history, see List of Miami FC seasons.

Season	Tier	League	Conf/Div	Record							Position		Playoffs	USOC	USL Cup	Avg. Attendance (Note: Only includes regular season attendance.)	Top goalscorer	
Season	Tier	League	Conf/Div	Pld	W	D	L	GF	GA	Pts	Conf	Ovr	Playoffs	USOC	USL Cup	Avg. Attendance	Name	Goals
2021	2	USLC	Eastern/Atlantic	32	16	6	10	55	40	54	4th	8th	R1	NH	-	699 (Note: First seven home matches were played behind closed doors due to the COVID-19 pandemic and were not used to find the average)	(Haiti) Christiano François	11
2022	2	USLC	Eastern	34	15	10	9	47	32	55	6th	9th	R1	R3	-	1,144	(United States) Kyle Murphy	10
2023	2	USLC	Eastern	34	11	8	15	43	44	41	9th	20th	DNQ	R3	-	1,432	(El Salvador) Joaquín Rivas	10
2024	2	USLC	Eastern	34	3	2	29	26	89	11	12th	24th	DNQ	R3	DNP	1,075	(Cuba) Frank López	7
2025	2	USLC	Eastern	30	8	6	16	29	44	30	11th	23rd	DNQ	R3	GS		(Argentina) Francisco Bonfiglio	14

=== Average attendance ===
Year	Reg. season	Playoffs
2016	5,427	–
2017	5,172	7,115
2019 (Note: Only includes National Independent Soccer Association attendances)	569	1,309
2020 (Note: Games were played behind closed doors due to the COVID-19 pandemic)	N/A	–
2021 (Note: First seven home matches were played behind closed doors due to the COVID-19 pandemic and were not used to find the average)	699	–
2022	1,144	–
2023	1,432	–
2024	1,075	–

== Stadium ==
Name	Location	Years
Pitbull Stadium	Miami, Florida	2016–2017, 2019, (Note: One regular season National Independent Soccer Association match & the 2019 NISA East Coast Championship) 2020–present
Cobb Stadium	Coral Gables, Florida	2017; 1 match in U.S. Open Cup
St. Thomas University Soccer Field	Miami Gardens, Florida	2018
Florida International University Soccer Stadium	Miami, Florida	2018; 2 matches in U.S. Open Cup; 2022;1 match in U.S. Open Cup; 2023; 1 match in U.S. Open Cup; 2024; 1 match in U.S. Open Cup, 4 matches in USL Championship
Buccaneer Field	Miami Shores, Florida	2019

== Players and staff ==
=== Current roster ===
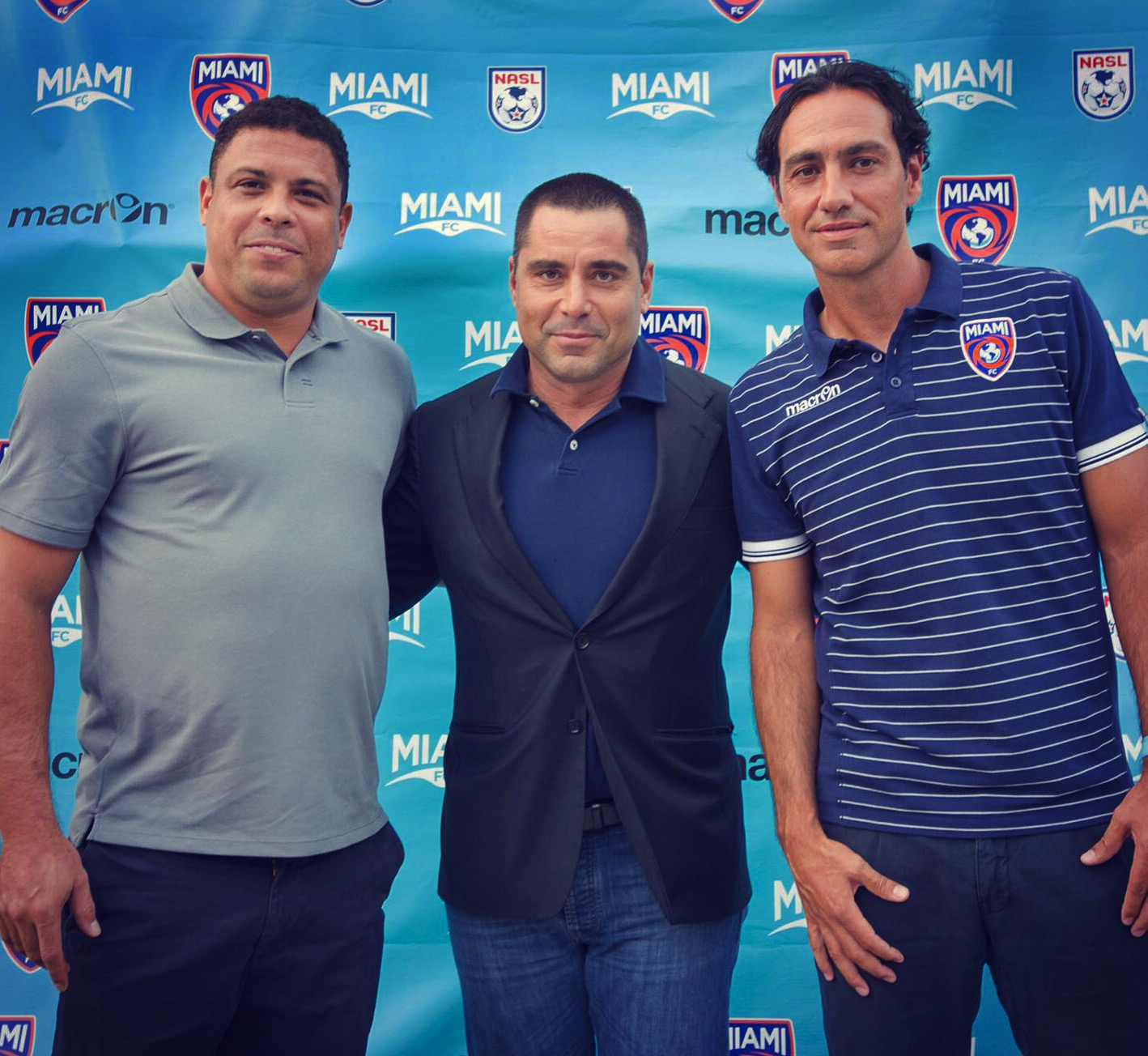
Miami FC President and co-owner, Riccardo Silva (center) with Ronaldo Luís Nazário de Lima (left) and former head coach, Alessandro Nesta (right)

As of November 7, 2026

Note: Flags indicate national team as defined under FIFA eligibility rules; some limited exceptions apply. Players may hold more than one non-FIFA nationality.

No.	Pos.	Nation	Player
1	GK	CUW	Eloy Room
2	DF	YEM	Harwan Al-Zubaidi
4	DF	USA	Angelo Calfo
5	MF	JPN	Riyon Tori
6	DF	TOG	Tulu
7	MF	ENG	Mason Tunbridge
8	MF	ARG	Matías Romero
9	MF	USA	Joel Soñora
12	MF	SEN	Bachir Ndiaye
13	MF	USA	Daltyn Knutson
14	DF	ENG	Arthur Rogers
16	MF	PUR	Gerald Díaz

No.	Pos.	Nation	Player
17	DF	MEX	Jonathan Levin
18	MF	SEN	Mame Diallo
20	MF	PER	Alessandro Milesi
22	MF	BRA	Rodrigo da Costa
23	MF	USA	Tommy Musto
24	FW	CUB	Denilson Milanés
26	FW	COL	Arney Rocha
27	FW	CMR	Mathieu Ndongo
28	GK	URU	Felipe Rodríguez
30	DF	USA	Jeremy Medranda
37	FW	USA	Diego Mello
47	DF	USA	Massimo Mlekus

1. USL Academy Contract

=== Staff ===
As of March 9, 2025

Position	Staff	Nation
Head coach	Gastόn Maddoni	Argentina
Assistant coach	Víctor Lonchuk	Argentina
Goalkeeper coach	Cristian Blanco	Argentina
Strength & performance coach	Lucas Vaeza	United States

== Individual records ==
=== Top goalscorers ===
As of match played October 26, 2024

(Appearances listed in parentheses next to total)

	Name	Years	League	Playoffs	U.S. Open Cup	Total
1	(Cuba) Ariel Martínez	2016–2019, 2021	21 (101)	9 (14)	1 (7)	31 (122)
2	(United States) Jaime Chavez	2016–2018	24 (63)	1 (5)	3 (6)	28 (74)
3	(United States) Dylan Mares	2017–2018, 2019	21 (56)	4 (12)	2 (9)	27 (77)
4	(Mexico) Miguel González	2019–2020	21 (31)	4 (7)	0 (1)	25 (39)
5	(Brazil) Stefano Pinho	2017	17 (27)	0 (1)	4 (3)	21 (31)
6	(United States) Kyle Murphy	2022–2023	16 (62)	0 (1)	1 (3)	17 (66)
6	(Senegal) Mohamed Thiaw	2019–2020	15 (30)	2 (7)	0 (1)	17 (38)
7	(Cuba) Darío Suárez	2018–2019	10 (24)	4 (12)	2 (4)	16 (40)
8	(El Salvador) Joaquín Rivas	2022–2023	14 (42)	1 (1)	0 (1)	15 (44)
8	(Italy) Vincenzo Rennella	2016–2018	14 (39)	0 (1)	1 (8)	15 (48)
8	(Ghana) Kwadwo Poku	2016–2017	13 (49)	0 (1)	2 (5)	15 (55)

=== Most appearances ===
As of match played October 26, 2024

(Goals scored listed in parentheses next to total)

	Name	Years	League	Playoffs	U.S. Open Cup	Total
1	(Cuba) Ariel Martínez	2016–2019, 2021	101 (21)	14 (9)	7 (1)	122 (31)
2	(Nigeria) Bolu Akinyode	2021–2023	92 (2)	2 (0)	4 (0)	98 (2)
3	(England) Paco Craig	2021–2023	91 (6)	2 (0)	3 (0)	96 (6)
4	(Argentina) Mario Daniel Vega	2016–2018	75 (0)	6 (0)	8 (0)	89 (0)
5	(Canada) Mason Trafford	2016–2018	69 (0)	6 (0)	9 (0)	84 (0)
6	(United States) Rhett Bernstein	2016–2018	66 (2)	6 (0)	6 (1)	78 (3)
7	(United States) Dylan Mares	2017–2018, 2019	56 (21)	12 (4)	9 (2)	77 (27)
8	(United States) Jaime Chavez	2016–2018	63 (24)	5 (1)	6 (3)	74 (28)
9	(England) Callum Chapman-Page	2019, 2021–2023	63 (5)	8 (1)	2 (0)	73 (6)
10	(United States) Aedan Stanley	2022–2023	64 (0)	1 (0)	4 (0)	69 (0)
10	(United States) Mark Segbers	2022–2023	64 (2)	1 (0)	4 (0)	69 (2)

=== Managerial records ===
As of match played October 26, 2024

Name	From	To	P	W	D	L	GS	GA	%W	Honours	Notes
(Italy) Alessandro Nesta	September 1, 2015	November 17, 2017	71	35	17	19	111	78	49.30	(1) NASL Spring Season (1) NASL Fall Season	
(Scotland) Paul Dalglish	January 25, 2018	November 13, 2019	45	36	5	4	143	30	80.00	(2) NPSL Sunshine Conference Championship (2018, 2019) (2) NPSL South Region Championship (2018, 2019) (2) NPSL Championship (2018, 2019) (1) NISA East Coast Championship	
(United States) Nelson Vargas	November 14, 2019	August 10, 2020	3	0	0	3	4	11	0.00		
(Scotland) Paul Dalglish	August 10, 2020	November 15, 2021	46	20	10	16	71	64	43.48		(Note: During the 2021 USL Championship season Dalglish tested positive for COVID-19 and was unable to perform his duties as head coach. Assistant coach Andy Thomson ran the squad for three matches between July 7 and 17 and earned a record of 3-0-0. However, USL does not acknowledge this and still lists Dalglish as the head coach during this time.)
(Wales) Anthony Pulis	November 29, 2021	June 20, 2023	54	19	18	17	74	63	35.19		
(United States) Lewis Neal (interim)	June 20, 2023	November 9, 2023	19	9	1	9	24	21	47.37		
(Italy) Antonio Nocerino	November 14, 2023	October 16, 2024	33	3	2	28	27	82	9.09		
(Brazil) Marcello Alves (interim)	October 16, 2024	January 23, 2025	2	0	0	2	1	11	0.00		
(Argentina) Gastόn Maddoni	January 23, 2025	present	0	0	0	0	0	0	—		

== Club culture ==
Miami FC draw the bulk of their support from the suburbs in the south and west of Miami.

The club's mascot is Golazo, a seven-foot-tall Kingfisher bird with blue and orange feathers.

=== Rivalries ===
The closest team geographically was the Fort Lauderdale Strikers with games between the two sides often labelled the FL Clásico. Fixtures with the other two teams in Florida, the Tampa Bay Rowdies and Jacksonville Armada are also keenly contested. These four teams competed for the Coastal Cup over the course of the 2016 season.

After the 2016 season Tampa Bay left the NASL for the United Soccer League and Fort Lauderdale ceased operations because of financial issues. That left Jacksonville as Miami FC's only in-state rival in the NASL. Miami did however face Tampa Bay in the third round of the 2017 U.S. Open Cup, defeating the Rowdies by a score of 2–0.

When the NASL cancelled the 2018 season, Miami and Jacksonville continued their rivalry in the NPSL in both 2018 and 2019 as both clubs continued operation. The two teams would meet again in the 2023 U.S. Open Cup, which saw Miami FC winning 3–1. The team also began a rivalry against Miami United FC dubbed "Magic City Clasico". The teams met in the Second Round of the 2018 U.S. Open Cup where United shocked FC, 3–1, to advance. They would also meet in the 2022 Edition of the U.S. Open Cup, which Miami FC won 3–0.

They also have a local rivalry with MLS team Inter Miami, who they have played twice the US Open Cup in 2022 and 2023.

In 2024, Miami and USL League One side FC Naples formed the Alligator Alley Derby, named after Interstate 75 in Florida between Naples and Fort Lauderdale. The two teams are set to play their first match against one another in the 2025 USL Cup.

=== Supporters group ===
Dade Brigade are the official supporters group of Miami FC and they occupy the east stand of Pitbull Stadium which is known as the Brigade End for home games. They are named for Miami-Dade County.

== Honors ==
=== North American Soccer League ===
- Spring championship (1): 2017
- Fall championship (1): 2017

=== National Premier Soccer League ===
- National Championship (2): 2018, 2019
- South Region Championship (2): 2018, 2019
- Sunshine Conference Championship (2): 2018, 2019

=== National Independent Soccer Association ===
- East Coast Championship (1): 2019
