= 2017 San Francisco Deltas season =

San Francisco Deltas
2017 season
- Head coach: Marc Dos Santos
- Stadium: Kezar Stadium
- NASL: Spring: 2nd Fall: 2nd Combined: 2nd
- Soccer Bowl: Final
- U.S. Open Cup: Fourth Round vs San Jose Earthquakes
- Top goalscorer: League: Tom Heinemann (9); All: Tom Heinemann (11)

The 2017 San Francisco Deltas season was the club's only season of existence. The club plays in North American Soccer League, the second tier of the American soccer pyramid.

== Roster ==
As of match played 12 November 2017

No.	Name	Nationality	Position	Date of birth (age)	Signed from	Signed in	Contract ends	Apps.	Goals
Goalkeepers
1	Romuald Peiser	(France)	GK	3 August 1979 (age 47)	Ottawa Fury	2017		33	0
12	Steward Ceus	(Haiti)	GK	26 March 1987 (age 39)	Minnesota United FC	2017		3	0
24	Alex Mangels	(United States)	GK	29 July 1993 (age 33)	Tulsa Roughnecks	2017		1	0
Defenders
2	Bryan Burke	(United States)	DF	3 January 1989 (age 37)	Jacksonville Armada	2017		14	3
3	Nana Attakora	(Canada)	DF	27 March 1989 (age 37)	Fort Lauderdale Strikers	2017		20	0
5	Kenny Teijsse	(Netherlands)	DF	12 July 1992 (age 34)	Go Ahead Eagles	2017		25	2
6	Patrick Hopkins	(United States)	DF	18 December 1987 (age 38)	IK Sirius FK	2017		24	2
15	Maxim Tissot	(Canada)	DF	13 April 1992 (age 34)	D.C. United	2017		24	0
20	Karl Ouimette	(Canada)	DF	18 June 1992 (age 34)	New York Red Bulls	2017		26	0
27	Andrew Lubahn	(United States)	DF	10 September 1991 (age 35)	Louisville City	2017		18	0
35	Reiner	(Brazil)	DF	17 November 1985 (age 40)	Adana Demirspor	2017		36	3
Midfielders
4	Tyler Gibson	(United States)	MF	12 January 1991 (age 35)	Rayo OKC	2017		35	1
7	Jackson	(Brazil)	MF	3 June 1988 (age 38)	Toronto FC	2017		26	1
8	Cristian Portilla	(Spain)	MF	28 August 1988 (age 38)	Mensajero	2017		19	2
10	Kyle Bekker	(Canada)	MF	2 September 1990 (age 36)	Montreal Impact	2017		33	4
14	Saalih Muhammad	(United States)	MF	25 August 1995 (age 31)	NK Croatia Đakovo	2017		0	0
23	Greg Jordan	(United States)	MF	5 April 1990 (age 36)	Minnesota United FC	2017		22	0
30	Michael Stephens	(United States)	MF	3 April 1989 (age 37)	Chicago Fire	2017		31	0
Forwards
9	Tommy Heinemann	(United States)	FW	23 April 1987 (age 39)	Tampa Bay Rowdies	2017		34	12
11	Pablo Dyego	(Brazil)	FW	8 March 1994 (age 32)	loan from Fluminense	2017		30	6
17	Devon Sandoval	(United States)	FW	16 June 1991 (age 35)	Real Salt Lake	2017		32	5
21	Dagoberto	(Brazil)	FW	22 March 1983 (age 43)	Vitória	2017		13	3
Left During the Season
25	Danny Cruz	(United States)	FW	3 January 1990 (age 36)	Minnesota United FC	2017		16	1

=== Staff ===
- (Canada) Marc Dos Santos – Head Coach

=== Winter ===
Note: Flags indicate national team as has been defined under FIFA eligibility rules. Players may hold more than one non-FIFA nationality.

In: Note: Flags indicate national team as defined under FIFA eligibility rules; some limited exceptions apply. Players may hold more than one non-FIFA nationality.

No.	Pos.	Nation	Player
1	GK	FRA	Romuald Peiser (from (Canada) Ottawa Fury)
2	DF	USA	Bryan Burke (from (United States) Jacksonville Armada)
3	DF	CAN	Nana Attakora (from (United States) Fort Lauderdale Strikers)
4	MF	USA	Tyler Gibson (from (United States) Rayo OKC)
5	DF	NED	Kenny Teijsse (from (Netherlands) Go Ahead Eagles)
6	DF	USA	Patrick Hopkins (from (United States) DePaul Blue Demons)
7	MF	BRA	Jackson
8	MF	ESP	Cristian Portilla (from (Spain) Mensajero)
9	FW	USA	Tom Heinemann (from (United States) Tampa Bay Rowdies)
10	MF	CAN	Kyle Bekker (from (Canada) Montreal Impact)
11	FW	BRA	Pablo Dyego (loan from (Brazil) Fluminense)
12	GK	HAI	Steward Ceus (from (United States) Minnesota United FC)
15	DF	CAN	Maxim Tissot (from (United States) D.C. United)
17	FW	USA	Devon Sandoval (from (United States) Real Salt Lake)
20	DF	CAN	Karl Ouimette (from (United States) New York Red Bulls)
23	MF	USA	Greg Jordan (from (United States) Minnesota United FC)
24	GK	USA	Alex Mangels (from (United States) Tulsa Roughnecks)
25	FW	USA	Danny Cruz (from (United States) Minnesota United FC)
30	MF	USA	Michael Stephens (from (United States) Chicago Fire)
35	DF	BRA	Reiner (from (Turkey) Adana Demirspor)
—	MF	FRA	Maxime Bourgeois (from (France) US Créteil)
—	MF	USA	Danny Szetela (from (United States) New York Cosmos)

Out: Note: Flags indicate national team as defined under FIFA eligibility rules; some limited exceptions apply. Players may hold more than one non-FIFA nationality.

No.	Pos.	Nation	Player
—	MF	FRA	Maxime Bourgeois
—	MF	USA	Danny Szetela (to (United States) New York Cosmos)

=== Summer ===
In: Note: Flags indicate national team as defined under FIFA eligibility rules; some limited exceptions apply. Players may hold more than one non-FIFA nationality.

No.	Pos.	Nation	Player
21	FW	BRA	Dagoberto (from (Brazil) Vitória)

Out: Note: Flags indicate national team as defined under FIFA eligibility rules; some limited exceptions apply. Players may hold more than one non-FIFA nationality.

No.	Pos.	Nation	Player
25	FW	USA	Danny Cruz (to (United States) Real Monarchs)

== Friendlies ==
February 11, 2017 Scrimmage	Reno 1868	1–1	San Francisco Deltas	Sparks, Nevada
14:30 PT	Echeverria 69'	Report	Alvarez 90'	Stadium: Golden Eagle Park & Sports Complex; Attendance: Closed-door

February 15, 2017 Scrimmage	San Jose Earthquakes	0–1	San Francisco Deltas	San Jose, California
14:00 PT		Report	Sandoval 31'	Stadium: Earthquakes Training Facility

February 25, 2017 Scrimmage	California Golden Bears	0-0	San Francisco Deltas	Berkeley, California
PT				Stadium: California Memorial Stadium

March 11, 2017 Scrimmage	San Francisco Deltas	2-1	East Bay Stompers	San Francisco, California
19:00 PT	Kyle Bekker; Jackson			Stadium: Beach Chalet

March 18, 2017 Friendly	San Francisco Deltas	0-0	Sacramento Republic	San Francisco, California
22:00 PT				Stadium: Kezar Stadium

== Competitions ==
=== NASL Spring season ===
==== Standings ====
Pos	Team	Pld	W	D	L	GF	GA	GD	Pts	Qualification
1	Miami FC (S)	16	11	3	2	33	11	+22	36	Playoffs
2	San Francisco Deltas	16	7	5	4	17	20	−3	26	
3	New York Cosmos	16	6	6	4	22	21	+1	24	
4	Jacksonville Armada	16	6	6	4	17	16	+1	24	
5	North Carolina FC	16	6	3	7	21	22	−1	21	
6	Indy Eleven	16	4	8	4	21	22	−1	20	
7	FC Edmonton	16	4	1	11	11	21	−10	13	
8	Puerto Rico FC	16	1	6	9	19	28	−9	9	

Source: NASL
Rules for classification: 1) points; 2) total goal differential; 3) total goals scored; 4) head-to-head record; 5) away goal differential; 6) away goals scored
(S) Spring season champion

==== Results summary ====
Overall								Home						Away					
Pld	W	D	L	GF	GA	GD	Pts	W	D	L	GF	GA	GD	W	D	L	GF	GA	GD
16	7	5	4	17	20	−3	26	3	2	3	10	11	−1	4	3	1	7	9	−2

Last updated: 15 July 2017.
Source: Match reports

==== Results by round ====
Round	1	2	3	4	5	6	7	8	9	10	11	12	13	14	15	16
Stadium	H	H	A	A	H	A	A	H	A	H	A	H	A	H	A	H
Result	D	W	D	D	L	W	W	L	D	D	W	W	W	W	L	L
Position	4	2	2	2	5	3	2	5	5	5	3	2	2	2	2	2

Updated to match(es) played on 15 July 2017. Source: Match reports
A = Away; H = Home; W = Win; D = Draw; L = Loss

==== Matches ====
25 March 2017 1	San Francisco Deltas	1–1	Indy Eleven	San Francisco
19:00 PDT	Bekker 31'; Attakora (yellow card) 61'; Dyego (yellow card) 66'	[ NASL Report] Summary	Watson-Siriboe (yellow card) 55'; Thompson 58'; Vuković (yellow card) 61'	Stadium: Kezar Stadium; Attendance: 4,133; Referee: Baldomero Toledo

8 April 2017 2	San Francisco Deltas	3–1	North Carolina	San Francisco
19:00 PDT	Portilla (yellow card) 21'; Reiner (yellow card) 26'; Heinemann 45+3', 90'; Dyego 82'	[ NASL Report] Summary	Shipalane 23'; Sylvestre (yellow card) 35'; Albadawi (yellow card) 60'	Stadium: Kezar Stadium; Attendance: 1,739; Referee: Alejandro Mariscal

15 April 2017 3	Jacksonville Armada	0–0	San Francisco Deltas	Jacksonville
16:00 PDT	Ryden (yellow card) 8'; Pitchkolan (yellow card) 20'; Banks (yellow card) 67'; Blake (yellow card) 90+2'	[ NASL Report] Summary	Dyego (yellow card) 5'; Heinemann (yellow card) 44'	Stadium: Hodges Stadium; Attendance: 3,512; Referee: Mark Kadlecik

22 April 2017 4	Indy Eleven	0–0	San Francisco Deltas	Indianapolis
12:00 PDT	Palmer (yellow card) 44'; Ring (yellow card) 67'; Braun (yellow card) 71'	[ NASL Report] Summary		Stadium: Michael Carroll Stadium; Attendance: 7,124; Referee: Dave Gantar

29 April 2017 5	San Francisco Deltas	0–1	New York Cosmos	San Francisco
19:00 PDT	Portilla (yellow card) 18'; Teijsse (yellow card) 59'; Bekker (yellow card) 86'	[ NASL Report] Summary	Ledesma (yellow card) 26', (goal) 69'; Mulligan (yellow card) 60'; Szetela (yellow card) 78'	Stadium: Kezar Stadium; Attendance: 3,302; Referee: Timothy Ford

6 May 2017 6	North Carolina FC	1–2	San Francisco Deltas	Cary
16:30 PDT	Schuler 85'	[ NASL Report] Summary	Reiner 22'; Teijsse (yellow card) 83'; Jackson 87'	Stadium: WakeMed Soccer Park; Attendance: 4,525; Referee: Guido Gonzalez

14 May 2017 7	FC Edmonton	0–1	San Francisco Deltas	Edmonton
13:00 PDT	Nyassi 55'; Sansara (yellow card) 79'; Ledgerwood (yellow card) 88'	[ NASL Report] Summary	Attakora (yellow card) 12'; Portilla 89'	Stadium: Clarke Stadium; Attendance: 2,968; Referee: Alain Ruch

19 May 2017 8	San Francisco Deltas	0–3	Jacksonville Armada	San Francisco
19:30 PDT		NASL Report; Summary	Steinberger 28', 45'; George (yellow card) 32'; Gebhard 73'	Stadium: Kezar Stadium; Attendance: 2,201; Referee: David Gantar

27 May 2017 9	New York Cosmos	0–0	San Francisco Deltas	Brooklyn
14:00 PDT	Ledesma (yellow card) 45+1'; Restrepo (yellow card) 63'; Guerra (yellow card) 90+6'	NASL Report; Summary	Gibson (yellow card) 43'; Jordan (yellow card) 58'; Jackson (yellow card) 69'; Teijsse (yellow card) 90+3'	Stadium: MCU Park; Attendance: 5,421; Referee: Victor Rivas

3 June 2017 10	San Francisco Deltas	2–2	Indy Eleven	San Francisco
19:00 PDT	Cristian Portilla (yellow card) 78' (goal) 85'; Kyle Bekker (yellow card) 79'; Reiner (yellow card) 89'; Kenny Teijsse (yellow card) 90+1'; Devon Sandoval 90+3'	NASL Report; Summary	Lovel Palmer 56'; Eamon Zayed (yellow card) 62'; Jon Busch (yellow card) 73'; Brad Ring 79' (yellow card) 83'	Stadium: Kezar Stadium; Attendance: 1,441; Referee: Alex Chilowicz

10 June 2017 11	Puerto Rico FC	1–3	San Francisco Deltas	Bayamón
16:30 PDT	Puerto 65'; Welshman (yellow card) 62'	NASL Report; Summary	Teijsse 17' (yellow card) 49'; Jackson (yellow card) 24'; Bekker 31', 69'; Reiner (yellow card) 38'	Stadium: Estadio Juan Ramon Loubriel; Attendance: 4,679; Referee: Sandy Vasque

17 June 2017 12	San Francisco Deltas	1–0	FC Edmonton	San Francisco
19:00 PDT	Sandoval 40' (pen.); Heinemann (yellow card) 87'; Cruz (yellow card) 90+1'	NASL Report; Report	Ameobi (yellow card) 51'	Stadium: Kezar Stadium; Attendance: 1,894; Referee: Daniel Radford

24 June 2017 13	FC Edmonton	0–1	San Francisco Deltas	Edmonton
20:00 PDT	Ameobi (yellow card) 45'; Nyassi (yellow card) 63'; Zebie (yellow card) 73'	NASL Report; Report	Nicklaw 7' (o.g.)	Stadium: Clarke Stadium; Attendance: 3,890; Referee: Pierre Luce Lauziere

2 July 2017 14	San Francisco Deltas	2–0	Puerto Rico FC	San Francisco
17:30 PDT	Heinemann 24', 67'; Burke (yellow card) 32'; Portilla (yellow card) 47'; Gibson (yellow card) 73'	NASL Report; Report	Cristiano (yellow card) 82'; Ramírez (yellow card) 90+3'; Rivera (yellow card) 90+4'	Stadium: Kezar Stadium; Attendance: 1,915; Referee: Joe Dickerson

8 July 2017 15	Miami FC	7–0	San Francisco Deltas	Miami
16:30 PDT	Mares 5', 43' (yellow card) 36'; Stéfano 10', 15', 75', 90'; Martínez 53'	NASL Report; Report	Reiner (red card) 35'; Peiser (yellow card) 36'; Jackson (yellow card) 45+4'; Attakora (yellow card) 51'	Stadium: Riccardo Silva Stadium; Attendance: 5,515; Referee: Caleb Mendez

15 July 2017 16	San Francisco Deltas	1–3	Miami FC	San Francisco
19:00 PDT	Dyego (red card) 40'; Bekker (red card) 40'; Peiser (yellow card) 49'; Jackson (yellow card) 54'; Heinemann 71'	NASL Report; Report	Rennella 27', 50' (pen.); Chavez (yellow card) 55'; Poku 56'	Stadium: Kezar Stadium; Attendance: 2,723; Referee: Alejandro Mariscal

=== NASL Fall season ===
==== Standings ====
Pos	Team	Pld	W	D	L	GF	GA	GD	Pts	Qualification
1	Miami FC (F)	16	10	3	3	28	17	+11	33	Playoffs
2	San Francisco Deltas	16	7	7	2	24	15	+9	28	
3	North Carolina FC	16	5	9	2	25	15	+10	24	
4	New York Cosmos	16	4	9	3	34	30	+4	21	
5	Jacksonville Armada	16	4	7	5	21	22	−1	19	
6	Puerto Rico FC	16	4	4	8	13	23	−10	16	
7	FC Edmonton	16	3	5	8	14	21	−7	14	
8	Indy Eleven	16	3	4	9	18	34	−16	13	

Source: NASL
Rules for classification: 1) points; 2) total goal differential; 3) total goals scored; 4) head-to-head record; 5) away goal differential; 6) away goals scored
(F) Fall season champion

==== Results summary ====
Overall								Home						Away					
Pld	W	D	L	GF	GA	GD	Pts	W	D	L	GF	GA	GD	W	D	L	GF	GA	GD
16	7	7	2	24	15	+9	28	4	2	2	13	10	+3	3	5	0	11	5	+6

Last updated: 28 October 2017.
Source: Match reports

==== Results by round ====
Round	1	2	3	4	5	6	7	8	9	10	11	12	13	14	15	16
Stadium	A	H	A	H	H	A	A	H	A	A	A	H	H	H	A	H
Result	D	W	D	D	L	W	D	W	W	D	W	W	W	D	D	L
Position	6	2	2	3	6	3	4	3	3	3	3	1	1	1	2	2

Updated to match(es) played on 28 October 2017. Source: Match reports
A = Away; H = Home; W = Win; D = Draw; L = Loss

==== Matches ====
30 July 2017 17	Jacksonville Armada	1–1	San Francisco Deltas	Jacksonville
15:00 PDT	George (yellow card) 29'; Blake 35' (pen.) (yellow card) 45+3'; Beckie (yellow card) 78'	NASL Report; Summary	Jackson (yellow card) 28'; Cruz 58'; Jordan (yellow card) 84'; Lubahn (yellow card) 86'; Stephens (yellow card) 90+2'; Heinemann (yellow card) 90+3'	Stadium: Hodges Stadium; Attendance: 3,126; Referee: Jon Freemon

5 August 2017 18	San Francisco Deltas	2–1	New York Cosmos	San Francisco
17:00 PDT	Heinemann (yellow card) 26' (goal) 45+1' (pen.); Reiner (yellow card) 33'; Hopkins 36'; Dagoberto (yellow card) 45+5'; Jackson (yellow card) 75'	Report	Vranjicán 3'; Ochieng (yellow card) 38'; Ayoze (yellow card) 82'	Stadium: Kezar Stadium; Attendance: 3,369; Referee: Malik Badawi

12 August 2017 19	Puerto Rico	0–0	San Francisco Deltas	Bayamón
17:30 PDT	Ramírez (yellow card) 49'; Yuma (yellow card) 62'	Report	Reiner (yellow card) 90+2'	Stadium: Estadio Juan Ramon Loubriel; Attendance: 3,069; Referee: Daneon Parchment

19 August 2017 20	San Francisco Deltas	1–1	North Carolina	San Francisco
18:00 PDT	Hopkins 60'; Dagoberto (yellow card) 71'	Report	Sylvestre (yellow card) 25'; Laing 72' (pen.) da Luz (yellow card) 85'	Stadium: Kezar Stadium; Attendance: 2,094; Referee: Victor Rivas

26 August 2017 21	San Francisco Deltas	1–2	FC Edmonton	San Francisco
17:00 PDT	Jordan (yellow card) 23'; Dagoberto 62' (pen.) (yellow card) 78'; Bekker (red card) 71'; Heinemann (yellow card) 88'; Gibson (yellow card) 89'	Report	Smith (yellow card) 6' (yellow-red card) 66'; Ameobi 30'; McKendry (yellow card) 48'; Zebie 64'; Nicklaw (yellow card) 87'	Stadium: Kezar Stadium; Attendance: 2,168; Referee: Alex Chilowicz

2 September 2017 22	Indy Eleven	0–2	San Francisco Deltas	Indianapolis
16:30 PDT	Franco (yellow card) 74'	Report	Dyego 41', 87'	Stadium: Michael Carroll Stadium; Attendance: 8,702; Referee: Juan Guzmán

9 September 2017 23	San Francisco Deltas	–	Miami	San Francisco
17:00 PDT				Stadium: Kezar Stadium
Note: Match postponed due to Hurricane Irma.

17 September 2017 24	Miami	–	San Francisco Deltas	Miami
16:30 PDT				Stadium: Riccardo Silva Stadium
Note: Match postponed due to Hurricane Irma.

21 September 2017 25	New York Cosmos	2–2	San Francisco Deltas	Brooklyn
17:30 PDT	Guerra 19' (yellow card) 58'; Vranjicán 61' (pen.); Ayoze (yellow card) 90+4'	Report	Jordan (yellow card) 16'; Pablo Dyego (yellow card) 28'; Stephens (red card) 62'; Sandoval 80' (pen.), 85'; Jackson (yellow card) 88'	Stadium: MCU Park; Attendance: 4,360; Referee: Guido Gonzalez

23 September 2017 26	San Francisco Deltas	2–1	FC Edmonton	San Francisco
16:00 PDT	Burke 14'; Watson 35' (o.g.)	Report	Eustáquio (yellow card) 73'; Corea 80'	Stadium: Kezar Stadium; Attendance: 2,951; Referee: Ramy Touchan

1 October 2017 27	FC Edmonton	0–1	San Francisco Deltas	Edmonton
13:00 PDT	Eustáquio (yellow card) 74'; Ledgerwood (yellow card) 88'	Report	Burke (yellow card) 42'; Teijsse 78'	Stadium: Clarke Stadium; Attendance: 2,231; Referee: David Barrie

4 October 2017 24	Miami	1–1	San Francisco Deltas	Miami
16:30 PDT	Rennella 10' (yellow card) 58'; Palmer (yellow card) 75'; Poku (yellow card) 90+3'	Report	Dyego 20' (pen.)	Stadium: Riccardo Silva Stadium; Attendance: 2,237; Referee: Joe Dickerson
Note: Match originally postponed due to Hurricane Irma.

7 October 2017 28	Miami	0–3	San Francisco Deltas	Miami
16:30 PDT	Palmer (yellow card) 60'; Trafford (yellow card) 81'	Report	Reiner 15'; Heinemann 63', 78'	Stadium: Riccardo Silva Stadium; Attendance: 4,005; Referee: Marcos de Oliveira

11 October 2017 29	San Francisco Deltas	2–1	Indy Eleven	San Francisco
16:30 PDT	Falvey 12' (o.g.); Jackson (yellow card) 60'; Dagoberto 81' (yellow card) 83'	Report	Henderson 7' (yellow card) 36'; Ring (yellow card) 35'; Thompson (yellow card) 42'; Watson-Siriboe (yellow card) 90+1'; Miller (yellow card) 90+1'	Stadium: Kezar Stadium; Attendance: 1,542; Referee: Baboucarr Jallow

14 October 2017 30	San Francisco Deltas	3–0	Puerto Rico	San Francisco
17:00 PDT	Burke 7', 45'; Pablo Dyego 47' (yellow card) 50'	Report	Culbertson (yellow card) 17'	Stadium: Kezar Stadium; Attendance: 2,402; Referee: Juan Guzmán

18 October 2017 23	San Francisco Deltas	2–2	Miami	San Francisco
14:00 PDT	Heinemann 25'; Teijsse (yellow card) 45+2'; Burke (yellow card) 48'; Dagoberto 78' (pen.)	Report	Palmer (yellow card) 23'; Stefano 28'; Smith 45+1'; Borrajo (yellow card) 90+3'	Stadium: Boxer Stadium; Referee: Michael Radchuk
Note: Match originally postponed due to Hurricane Irma.

21 October 2017 31	North Carolina	1–1	San Francisco Deltas	Cary
16:30 PDT	Marcelin (yellow card) 5' da Luz 30'; Renan (yellow card) 59'	Report	Pablo Dyego 68'	Stadium: WakeMed Soccer Park; Attendance: 7,344; Referee: Caleb Mendez

28 October 2017 32	San Francisco Deltas	0–2	Jacksonville Armada	San Francisco
13:00 PDT	Tissot (yellow card) 43'; Bekker (yellow card) 73'	Report	Banks 27'; George (yellow card) 40'; Taylor 60'	Stadium: Kezar Stadium; Attendance: 4,755; Referee: Farhad Dadkho

=== NASL Playoff ===
Pos	Team	Pld	W	D	L	GF	GA	GD	Pts	Qualification
1	Miami FC (X)	32	21	6	5	61	28	+33	69	Championship qualifiers
2	San Francisco Deltas (C)	32	14	12	6	41	35	+6	54	Championship qualifiers
3	North Carolina FC	32	11	12	9	46	37	+9	45	Championship qualifiers
4	New York Cosmos	32	10	15	7	56	51	+5	45	Championship qualifiers
5	Jacksonville Armada	32	10	13	9	38	38	0	43	
6	Indy Eleven	32	7	12	13	39	56	−17	33	
7	FC Edmonton	32	7	6	19	25	42	−17	27	
8	Puerto Rico FC	32	5	10	17	32	51	−19	25	

Source: NASL
Rules for classification: 1) points; 2) total goal differential; 3) total goals scored; 4) head-to-head record; 5) away goal differential; 6) away goals scored
(C) Champions; (X) Regular season champion

5 November 2017 Semi Final	San Francisco Deltas	1–0	North Carolina	San Francisco
17:00 PDT	Gibson 40'; Jordan (yellow card) 60'; Bekker (yellow card) 90'	Report		Stadium: Kezar Stadium; Attendance: 3,586; Referee: Alex Chilowicz

==== Soccer Bowl ====
12 November 2017	San Francisco Deltas	2–0	New York Cosmos	San Francisco
17:00 PDT	Heinemann 19' (pen.) (yellow card) 31'; Gibson (yellow card) 24'; Peiser (yellow card) 90'; Sandoval 90+5'	Report	Mulligan (yellow card) 45+3'; Ayoze (yellow card) 87'	Stadium: Kezar Stadium; Attendance: 9,691; Referee: Rubiel Vazquez

=== U.S. Open Cup ===
17 May 2017 Second round	San Francisco Deltas	2–1	Burlingame Dragons	Stanford
19:30 PDT	Jordan (yellow card) 40'; Reiner 45'; Heinemann 63' (yellow card) 90+'; Tissot (yellow card) 77'	Summary	Cox 29'; Blackmon (yellow card) 62'	Stadium: Laird Q. Cagan Stadium; Attendance: 253; Referee: Vincent Apple-Chiarella

31 May 2017 Third round	Phoenix Rising	1–2	San Francisco Deltas	Tempe
19:30 PDT	Greer (yellow card) 45'; Timm (yellow card) 45+6'; Bravo 85' (pen.)	Summary	Attakora (yellow card) 49'; Bekker 81'; Teijsse (yellow card) 83'; Heinemann 90+4'; Ceus (yellow card) 90+6'	Stadium: Phoenix Rising Soccer Complex; Attendance: 5,532; Referee: Robert Hullner

14 June 2017 Fourth round	San Jose Earthquakes	2–0	San Francisco Deltas	San Jose
19:30 PDT	Yueill 4'; Cato 6'; Dawkins (yellow card) 23'; Imperiale (yellow card) 48'; Bernárdez (yellow card) 57'; Wondolowski (yellow card) 84'	Report	Teijsse (yellow card) 63'; Bekker (yellow card) 69'; Attakora (yellow card) 86'	Stadium: Avaya Stadium; Attendance: 12,524; Referee: Victor Rivas

== Squad statistics ==
As of Match played 12 November 2017

=== Appearances and goals ===
No.	Pos	Nat	Player	Total		NASL Spring Season		NASL Fall Season		NASL Playoffs		U.S. Open Cup	
No.	Pos	Nat	Player	Apps	Goals	Apps	Goals	Apps	Goals	Apps	Goals	Apps	Goals
1	GK	(France) FRA	Romuald Peiser	33	0	16	0	15	0	2	0	0	0
2	DF	(United States) USA	Bryan Burke	14	3	2+3	0	8	3	0	0	1	0
3	DF	(Canada) CAN	Nana Attakora	20	0	15	0	1	0	2	0	2	0
4	MF	(United States) USA	Tyler Gibson	35	1	11+3	0	16	0	2	1	2+1	0
5	DF	(Netherlands) NED	Kenny Teijsse	25	2	14	1	7+2	1	0	0	2	0
6	DF	(United States) USA	Patrick Hopkins	24	2	3+2	0	16	2	0+1	0	1+1	0
7	MF	(Brazil) BRA	Jackson	26	1	10+3	1	8+1	0	2	0	2	0
8	MF	(Spain) ESP	Cristian Portilla	19	2	16	2	1	0	0	0	2	0
9	FW	(United States) USA	Tom Heinemann	34	12	14+1	5	9+5	4	2	1	2+1	2
10	MF	(Canada) CAN	Kyle Bekker	33	4	15	3	7+6	0	2	0	3	1
11	FW	(Brazil) BRA	Pablo Dyego	30	6	12+1	1	10+4	5	0+2	0	0+1	0
12	GK	(Haiti) HAI	Steward Ceus	3	0	0	0	0	0	0	0	3	0
15	DF	(Canada) CAN	Maxim Tissot	24	0	3+2	0	11+4	0	2	0	2	0
17	FW	(United States) USA	Devon Sandoval	32	5	3+12	2	5+8	2	0+2	1	1+1	0
20	DF	(Canada) CAN	Karl Ouimette	26	0	8	0	15	0	2	0	1	0
21	FW	(Brazil) BRA	Dagoberto	13	3	0	0	8+5	3	0	0	0	0
23	MF	(United States) USA	Greg Jordan	22	0	1+3	0	9+6	0	2	0	1	0
24	GK	(United States) USA	Alex Mangels	1	0	0	0	1	0	0	0	0	0
25	FW	(United States) USA	Danny Cruz	16	1	9+3	0	2	1	0	0	1+1	0
27	DF	(United States) USA	Andrew Lubahn	18	0	0+8	0	2+5	0	0	0	1+2	0
30	MF	(United States) USA	Michael Stephens	31	0	9+6	0	9+2	0	2	0	3	0
35	DF	(Brazil) BRA	Reiner	36	3	15	1	16	1	2	0	3	1
Players away on loan:
Players who left San Francisco Deltas during the season:

=== Goal scorers ===
Place	Position	Nation	Number	Name	NASL Spring Season	NASL Fall Season	NASL Playoffs	U.S. Open Cup	Total
1	MF	(United States)	9	Tom Heinemann	5	4	1	2	12
2	FW	(Brazil)	11	Pablo Dyego	1	5	0	0	6
3	FW	(United States)	17	Devon Sandoval	2	2	1	0	5
4	MF	(Canada)	10	Kyle Bekker	3	0	0	1	4
5	DF	(Brazil)	35	Reiner	1	1	0	1	3
5	DF	(United States)	2	Bryan Burke	0	3	0	0	3
5	FW	(Brazil)	21	Dagoberto	0	3	0	0	3
8	MF	(Spain)	8	Cristian Portilla	2	0	0	0	2
8	DF	(Netherlands)	5	Kenny Teijsse	1	1	0	0	2
8	DF	(United States)	6	Patrick Hopkins	0	2	0	0	2
8	-			Own goal	0	2	0	0	2
12	MF	(Brazil)	7	Jackson	1	0	0	0	1
12	FW	(United States)	25	Danny Cruz	0	1	0	0	1
12	MF	(United States)	4	Tyler Gibson	0	0	1	0	1
TOTALS					16	23	3	4	46

=== Disciplinary record ===
Number	Nation	Position	Name	NASL Spring Season		NASL Fall Season		NASL Playoffs		U.S. Open Cup		Total	
Number	Nation	Position	Name	Yellow card	Red card	Yellow card	Red card	Yellow card	Red card	Yellow card	Red card	Yellow card	Red card
1	(France)	GK	Romuald Peiser	2	0	0	0	1	0	0	0	3	0
2	(United States)	DF	Bryan Burke	1	0	2	0	0	0	0	0	3	0
3	(Canada)	DF	Nana Attakora	3	0	0	0	0	0	2	0	5	0
4	(United States)	MF	Tyler Gibson	2	0	1	0	1	0	0	0	4	0
5	(Netherlands)	DF	Kenny Teijsse	5	0	1	0	0	0	2	0	8	0
7	(Brazil)	MF	Jackson	4	0	4	0	0	0	0	0	8	0
8	(Spain)	MF	Cristian Portilla	4	0	0	0	0	0	0	0	4	0
9	(United States)	FW	Tom Heinemann	2	0	3	0	1	0	1	0	7	0
10	(Canada)	MF	Kyle Bekker	2	1	1	1	1	0	1	0	5	2
11	(Brazil)	FW	Pablo Dyego	2	1	2	0	0	0	0	0	4	1
12	(Haiti)	GK	Steward Ceus	0	0	0	0	0	0	1	0	1	0
15	(Canada)	DF	Maxim Tissot	0	0	1	0	0	0	1	0	2	0
21	(Brazil)	FW	Dagoberto	0	0	4	0	0	0	0	0	4	0
23	(United States)	MF	Greg Jordan	1	0	3	0	1	0	1	0	6	0
25	(United States)	FW	Danny Cruz	1	0	0	0	0	0	0	0	1	0
27	(United States)	DF	Andrew Lubahn	0	0	1	0	0	0	1	0	2	0
30	(United States)	MF	Michael Stephens	0	0	1	1	0	0	0	0	1	1
35	(Brazil)	DF	Reiner	3	1	2	0	0	0	0	0	5	1
			TOTALS	32	3	26	2	5	0	10	0	73	5
