= 2017 North American Soccer League season =

North American Soccer League
- Season: 2017
- Champions: San Francisco Deltas
- Spring Champions: Miami FC
- Fall Champions: Miami FC
- Matches: 128
- Goals: 338 (2.64 per match)
- Top goalscorer: (Brazil) Stefano Pinho (17)
- Biggest home win: MIA 7–0 SFD (July 8)
- Biggest away win: NYC 0–3 MIA (April 1)
- Highest scoring: NYC 5–2 PRF (October 28)
- Longest winning run: 4 games Miami FC (April 29 – May 20) (June 3 - June 24); San Francisco Deltas (June 10 – July 2)
- Longest unbeaten run: 10 games Miami FC (April 22 – June 24)
- Longest losing run: 5 games Puerto Rico FC (April 22 – May 20)
- Highest attendance: 9,515; MIA 0–2 NYC (April 8)
- Lowest attendance: 780; JAX 1–2 PRF (August 16)
- Total attendance: 550,871 (123 of 128 games reported)
- Average attendance: 4,479
- All statistics correct as of November 9, 2017.

The 2017 North American Soccer League season was the 50th season of Division II soccer in the United States and Canada, and the 7th season of the modern North American Soccer League. The defending champions are the New York Cosmos who defeated Indy Eleven in Soccer Bowl 2016.

Eight clubs played in the NASL after provisional sanctioning by the United States Soccer Federation. Expansion side, San Francisco Deltas joined the league. After the 2016 season, Minnesota United left the league to join Major League Soccer, and the Tampa Bay Rowdies and Ottawa Fury left the league to join the United Soccer League. The Carolina RailHawks FC rebranded as North Carolina FC. The Fort Lauderdale Strikers and Rayo OKC did not return to NASL for the 2017 season.

== Teams, stadiums, and personnel ==
=== Stadiums and locations ===
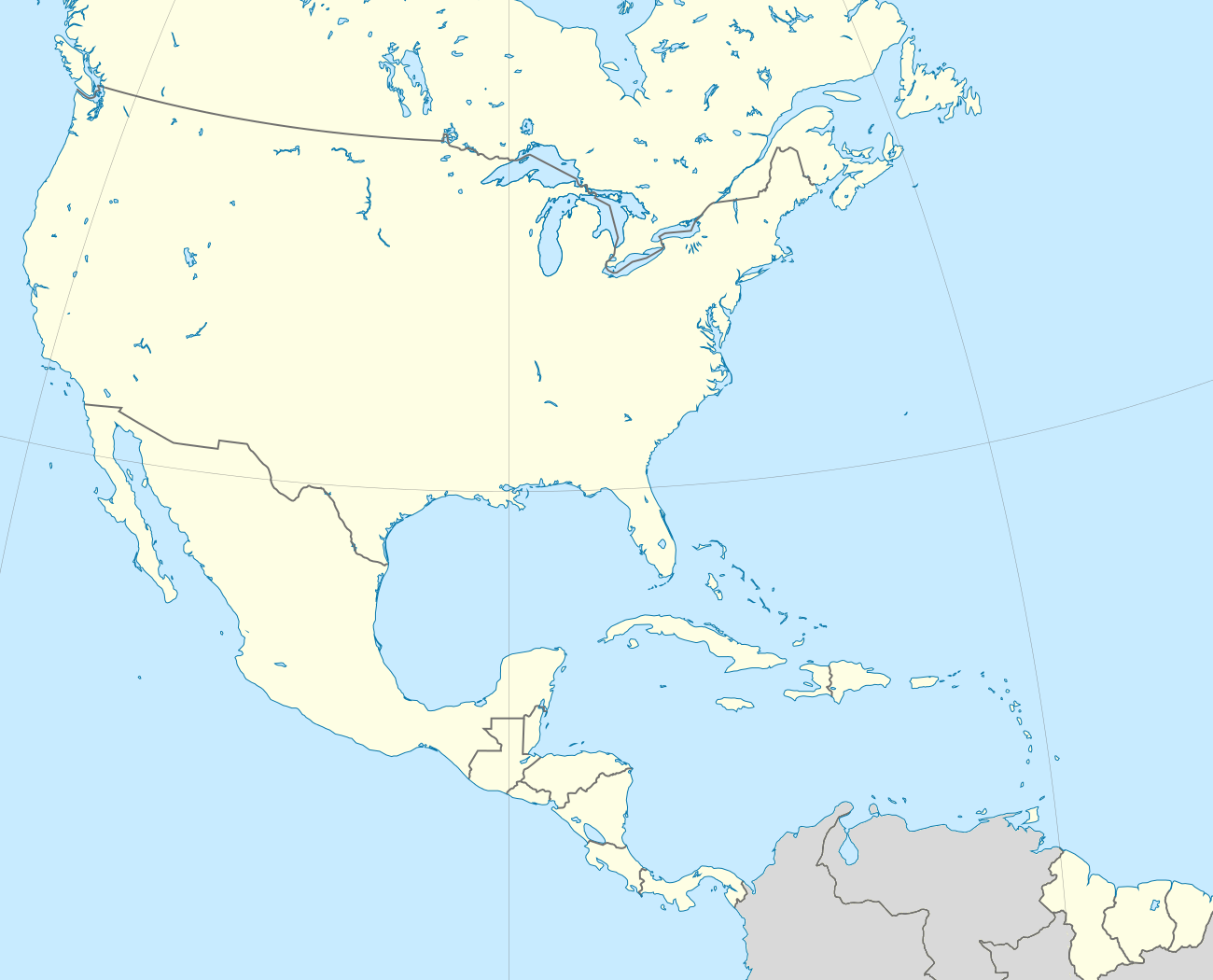
Locations of NASL clubs

=== Teams ===
| Team | Location | Stadium | Capacity | Manager | Captain | Kit Sponsor |
|---|---|---|---|---|---|---|
| FC Edmonton | Edmonton | Clarke Stadium | 5,000 | (Canada) Colin Miller | (Northern Ireland) Albert Watson | The Fath Group |
| Indy Eleven | Indianapolis | Michael A. Carroll Stadium | 10,524 | (United States) Tim Hankinson | (Republic of Ireland) Colin Falvey | Honda |
| Jacksonville Armada | Jacksonville | Hodges Stadium | 12,000 | (England) Mark Lowry | (United States) Aaron Pitchkolan | RP Funding |
| Miami FC | Miami | Riccardo Silva Stadium | 20,000 | (Italy) Alessandro Nesta | (United States) Jonathan Borrajo | |
| New York Cosmos | New York City | MCU Park | 7,000 | (Venezuela) Giovanni Savarese | (United States) Carlos Mendes | Fly Emirates |
| North Carolina FC | Raleigh | WakeMed Soccer Park | 10,000 | (Northern Ireland) Colin Clarke | (United States) Nazmi Albadawi | Circle K |
| Puerto Rico FC | Bayamón | Juan Ramón Loubriel Stadium | 22,000 | (Puerto Rico) Marco Vélez | (Brazil) Cristiano | Claro |
| San Francisco Deltas | San Francisco | Kezar Stadium | 10,000 | (Canada) Marc Dos Santos | (Canada) Nana Attakora | |

=== Managerial changes ===
| Team | Outgoing manager | Manner of departure | Date of vacancy | Position in table | Incoming manager | Date of appointment |
|---|---|---|---|---|---|---|
| Puerto Rico FC | (England) Adrian Whitbread | Fired | May 19, 2017 | 8th Place | (Puerto Rico) Marco Vélez (interim) | May 19, 2017 |
| Puerto Rico FC | (Puerto Rico) Marco Vélez (interim) | End of Interim Period | August 2, 2017 | 8th Place | (Puerto Rico) Marco Vélez | August 2, 2017 |

== Spring season ==
=== Standings ===
| Pos | Team | Pld | W | D | L | GF | GA | GD | Pts | Qualification |
|---|---|---|---|---|---|---|---|---|---|---|
| 1 | Miami FC (S) | 16 | 11 | 3 | 2 | 33 | 11 | +22 | 36 | Playoffs |
| 2 | San Francisco Deltas | 16 | 7 | 5 | 4 | 17 | 20 | −3 | 26 | |
| 3 | New York Cosmos | 16 | 6 | 6 | 4 | 22 | 21 | +1 | 24 | |
| 4 | Jacksonville Armada | 16 | 6 | 6 | 4 | 17 | 16 | +1 | 24 | |
| 5 | North Carolina FC | 16 | 6 | 3 | 7 | 21 | 22 | −1 | 21 | |
| 6 | Indy Eleven | 16 | 4 | 8 | 4 | 21 | 22 | −1 | 20 | |
| 7 | FC Edmonton | 16 | 4 | 1 | 11 | 11 | 21 | −10 | 13 | |
| 8 | Puerto Rico FC | 16 | 1 | 6 | 9 | 19 | 28 | −9 | 9 | |

Source: NASL
Rules for classification: 1) points; 2) total goal differential; 3) total goals scored; 4) head-to-head record; 5) away goal differential; 6) away goals scored
(S) Spring season champion

=== Results ===
Abbreviation and Color Key: FC Edmonton – FCE; Indy Eleven – IND; Jacksonville Armada – JAX; Miami FC – MIA; New York Cosmos – NYC; North Carolina FC – NCA; Puerto Rico FC – PRF; San Francisco Deltas – SFD; Home; Away; Win; Loss; Draw
| Club | Match | | | | | | | | | | | | | | | |
| Club | 1 | 2 | 3 | 4 | 5 | 6 | 7 | 8 | 9 | 10 | 11 | 12 | 13 | 14 | 15 | 16 |
|---|---|---|---|---|---|---|---|---|---|---|---|---|---|---|---|---|
| FC Edmonton | JAX | JAX | NCA | PRF | MIA | IND | SFD | IND | PRF | NYC | MIA | SFD | SFD | JAX | NCA | NYC |
| FC Edmonton | 0–1 | 0–1 | 1–3 | 2–1 | 0–2 | 0–0 | 0–1 | 2–1 | 0–3 | 4–2 | 0–1 | 0–1 | 0–1 | 0–1 | 2–1 | 0–1 |
| Indy Eleven | SFD | PRF | PRF | SFD | JAX | FCE | MIA | MIA | FCE | SFD | JAX | NCA | NCA | NYC | NYC | JAX |
| Indy Eleven | 1–1 | 3–3 | 1–1 | 0–0 | 1–1 | 0–0 | 2–3 | 0–2 | 1–2 | 2–2 | 1–4 | 2–0 | 2–1 | 1–1 | 2–1 | 2–0 |
| Jacksonville Armada | FCE | FCE | SFD | NYC | IND | NYC | NCA | SFD | NCA | MIA | IND | MIA | FCE | PRF | PRF | IND |
| Jacksonville Armada | 1–0 | 1–0 | 0–0 | 1–1 | 1–1 | 1–1 | 1–3 | 3–0 | 2–1 | 0–1 | 4–1 | 0–4 | 1–0 | 0–0 | 1–1 | 0–2 |
| Miami FC | NCA | NYC | NYC | NCA | FCE | PRF | IND | IND | PRF | JAX | FCE | JAX | NYC | NCA | SFD | SFD |
| Miami FC | 1–1 | 3–0 | 0–2 | 1–1 | 2–0 | 2–1 | 3–2 | 2–0 | 1–1 | 1–0 | 1–0 | 4–0 | 2–1 | 0–1 | 7–0 | 3–1 |
| New York Cosmos | PRF | MIA | MIA | JAX | SFD | JAX | PRF | SFD | NCA | FCE | NCA | PRF | MIA | IND | IND | FCE |
| New York Cosmos | 0–0 | 0–3 | 2–0 | 1–1 | 1–0 | 1–1 | 4–3 | 0–0 | 1–0 | 2–4 | 2–2 | 4–2 | 1–2 | 1–1 | 1–2 | 1–0 |
| North Carolina FC | MIA | SFD | FCE | MIA | PRF | SFD | JAX | PRF | JAX | NYC | NYC | IND | IND | MIA | FCE | PRF |
| North Carolina FC | 1–1 | 1–3 | 3–1 | 1–1 | 1–0 | 1–2 | 3–1 | 2–1 | 1–2 | 0–1 | 2–2 | 0–2 | 1–2 | 1–0 | 1–2 | 2–1 |
| Puerto Rico FC | NYC | IND | IND | FCE | NCA | MIA | NYC | NCA | MIA | FCE | SFD | NYC | SFD | JAX | JAX | NCA |
| Puerto Rico FC | 0–0 | 3–3 | 1–1 | 1–2 | 0–1 | 1–2 | 3–4 | 1–2 | 1–1 | 3–0 | 1–3 | 2–4 | 0–2 | 0–0 | 1–1 | 1–2 |
| San Francisco Deltas | IND | NCA | JAX | IND | NYC | NCA | FCE | JAX | NYC | IND | PRF | FCE | FCE | PRF | MIA | MIA |
| San Francisco Deltas | 1–1 | 3–1 | 0–0 | 0–0 | 0–1 | 2–1 | 1–0 | 0–3 | 0–0 | 2–2 | 3–1 | 1–0 | 1–0 | 2–0 | 0–7 | 1–3 |

== Fall season ==
=== Standings ===
| Pos | Team | Pld | W | D | L | GF | GA | GD | Pts | Qualification |
|---|---|---|---|---|---|---|---|---|---|---|
| 1 | Miami FC (F) | 16 | 10 | 3 | 3 | 28 | 17 | +11 | 33 | Playoffs |
| 2 | San Francisco Deltas | 16 | 7 | 7 | 2 | 24 | 15 | +9 | 28 | |
| 3 | North Carolina FC | 16 | 5 | 9 | 2 | 25 | 15 | +10 | 24 | |
| 4 | New York Cosmos | 16 | 4 | 9 | 3 | 34 | 30 | +4 | 21 | |
| 5 | Jacksonville Armada | 16 | 4 | 7 | 5 | 21 | 22 | −1 | 19 | |
| 6 | Puerto Rico FC | 16 | 4 | 4 | 8 | 13 | 23 | −10 | 16 | |
| 7 | FC Edmonton | 16 | 3 | 5 | 8 | 14 | 21 | −7 | 14 | |
| 8 | Indy Eleven | 16 | 3 | 4 | 9 | 18 | 34 | −16 | 13 | |

Source: NASL
Rules for classification: 1) points; 2) total goal differential; 3) total goals scored; 4) head-to-head record; 5) away goal differential; 6) away goals scored
(F) Fall season champion

=== Results ===
Abbreviation and Color Key: FC Edmonton – FCE; Indy Eleven – IND; Jacksonville Armada – JAX; Miami FC – MIA; New York Cosmos – NYC; North Carolina FC – NCA; Puerto Rico FC – PRF; San Francisco Deltas – SFD; Home; Away; Neutral; Win; Loss; Draw
| Club | Match | | | | | | | | | | | | | | | |
| Club | 1 | 2 | 3 | 4 | 5 | 6 | 7 | 8 | 9 | 10 | 11 | 12 | 13 | 14 | 15 | 16 |
|---|---|---|---|---|---|---|---|---|---|---|---|---|---|---|---|---|
| FC Edmonton | IND | IND | NYC | PRF | SFD | NCA | NCA | IND | SFD | SFD | JAX | NYC | JAX | MIA | PRF | MIA |
| FC Edmonton | 1–2 | 3-1 | 1–1 | 1–1 | 2-1 | 1–1 | 0–3 | 2-0 | 1–2 | 0–1 | 0–1 | 0–0 | 1–1 | 0–2 | 0–2 | 1–2 |
| Indy Eleven | FCE | FCE | MIA | NYC | JAX | SFD | NCA | FCE | JAX | NCA | PRF | NYC | SFD | MIA | PRF | NCA |
| Indy Eleven | 2–1 | 1–3 | 1-3 | 3–3 | 2-3 | 0–2 | 1-0 | 0–2 | 0–0 | 0–5 | 2–1 | 2–2 | 1-2 | 0–3 | 1-2 | 2–2 |
| Jacksonville Armada | SFD | PRF | NCA | PRF | MIA | IND | NYC | NYC | MIA | IND | MIA | FCE | NCA | FCE | NYC | SFD |
| Jacksonville Armada | 1–1 | 0-1 | 2–2 | 1-2 | 0-1 | 3-2 | 2-0 | 3–3 | 0-3 | 0–0 | 0-1 | 1-0 | 1–1 | 1–1 | 4–4 | 2-0 |
| Miami FC | NYC | NCA | IND | NCA | JAX | PRF | PRF | NYC | JAX | JAX | SFD | SFD | IND | SFD | FCE | FCE |
| Miami FC | 1–3 | 2-3 | 3-1 | 1-0 | 1-0 | 2-0 | 1-0 | 3–3 | 3-0 | 1-0 | 1–1 | 0–3 | 3-0 | 2–2 | 2-0 | 2-1 |
| New York Cosmos | MIA | SFD | FCE | IND | NCA | JAX | MIA | JAX | SFD | NCA | PRF | IND | FCE | PRF | JAX | PRF |
| New York Cosmos | 3–1 | 1-2 | 1–1 | 3–3 | 2–2 | 0–2 | 3–3 | 3–3 | 2–2 | 0-2 | 1-0 | 2–2 | 0–0 | 4–1 | 4–4 | 5–2 |
| North Carolina FC | PRF | MIA | JAX | MIA | SFD | NYC | FCE | FCE | IND | PRF | NYC | IND | PRF | JAX | SFD | IND |
| North Carolina FC | 1–1 | 3-2 | 2–2 | 0-1 | 1–1 | 2–2 | 1–1 | 3-0 | 0-1 | 0–0 | 2-0 | 5-0 | 1-0 | 1–1 | 1–1 | 2–2 |
| Puerto Rico FC | NCA | JAX | SFD | JAX | FCE | MIA | MIA | NCA | NYC | IND | NCA | SFD | NYC | IND | FCE | NYC |
| Puerto Rico FC | 1–1 | 1-0 | 0–0 | 2-1 | 1–1 | 0–2 | 0-1 | 0–0 | 0-1 | 1–2 | 0-1 | 0-3 | 1-4 | 2-1 | 2-0 | 2-5 |
| San Francisco Deltas | JAX | NYC | PRF | NCA | FCE | IND | NYC | FCE | FCE | MIA | MIA | IND | PRF | MIA | NCA | JAX |
| San Francisco Deltas | 1–1 | 2-1 | 0–0 | 1–1 | 1–2 | 2-0 | 2–2 | 2-1 | 1-0 | 1–1 | 3-0 | 2-1 | 3-0 | 2–2 | 1–1 | 0-2 |

== Playoffs ==
=== Combined standings ===
| Pos | Team | Pld | W | D | L | GF | GA | GD | Pts | Qualification |
|---|---|---|---|---|---|---|---|---|---|---|
| 1 | Miami FC (X) | 32 | 21 | 6 | 5 | 61 | 28 | +33 | 69 | Championship qualifiers |
| 2 | San Francisco Deltas (C) | 32 | 14 | 12 | 6 | 41 | 35 | +6 | 54 | Championship qualifiers |
| 3 | North Carolina FC | 32 | 11 | 12 | 9 | 46 | 37 | +9 | 45 | Championship qualifiers |
| 4 | New York Cosmos | 32 | 10 | 15 | 7 | 56 | 51 | +5 | 45 | Championship qualifiers |
| 5 | Jacksonville Armada | 32 | 10 | 13 | 9 | 38 | 38 | 0 | 43 | |
| 6 | Indy Eleven | 32 | 7 | 12 | 13 | 39 | 56 | −17 | 33 | |
| 7 | FC Edmonton | 32 | 7 | 6 | 19 | 25 | 42 | −17 | 27 | |
| 8 | Puerto Rico FC | 32 | 5 | 10 | 17 | 32 | 51 | −19 | 25 | |

Source: NASL
Rules for classification: 1) points; 2) total goal differential; 3) total goals scored; 4) head-to-head record; 5) away goal differential; 6) away goals scored
(C) Champions; (X) Regular season champion

=== The Championship ===
==== Participants ====
- Miami FC (Spring and Fall season champion)
- San Francisco Deltas
- North Carolina FC
- New York Cosmos

==== Bracket ====
Semi-Finals
November 5 – Riccardo Silva Stadium
#1 Miami FC | 0(5)
#4 New York Cosmos (pen.) | 0(6)
November 5 – Kezar Stadium
#2 San Francisco Deltas | 1
#3 North Carolina FC | 0

Championship
November 12 – Kezar Stadium
#2 San Francisco Deltas | 2
#4 New York Cosmos | 0

==== Semifinals ====
November 5, 2017
5:00 pm EST

| Miami FC | 0–0 (a.e.t.) | New York Cosmos |
|---|---|---|
| Mares (yellow card) 56' | Report | Calvillo (yellow card) 24'; Ledesma (yellow card) 65'; Mendes (yellow card) 67'; Szetela (yellow card) 103' |
Penalties
| Michel (penalty missed); Poku (penalty scored); Martínez (penalty scored); Chavez (penalty scored); Pinho (penalty scored); Freeman (penalty scored); Trafford (penalty missed) | 5–6 | (penalty scored) García; (penalty scored) Szetela; (penalty scored) Calvillo; (penalty scored) Vranjicán; (penalty missed) Guerra; (penalty scored) Mkosana; (penalty scored) Starikov |

Riccardo Silva Stadium, Miami, Florida
Attendance: 7,115
Referee: Marcos de Oliveira

November 5, 2017
5:00 pm PST

| San Francisco Deltas | 1–0 | North Carolina FC |
|---|---|---|
| Gibson 40'; Jordan (yellow card) 60'; Bekker (yellow card) 90' | Report |

Kezar Stadium, San Francisco, California
Attendance: 3,586
Referee: Alex Chilowicz

==== Soccer Bowl 2017 ====
November 12, 2017
5:00 PM PST

| San Francisco Deltas | 2–0 | New York Cosmos |
|---|---|---|
| Heinemann 19' (pen.) (yellow card) 31'; Gibson (yellow card) 24'; Peiser (yellow card) 90'; Sandoval 90+5' | Report; Report | Mulligan (yellow card) 45+3'; Ayoze (yellow card) 87' |

Kezar Stadium, San Francisco, California
Attendance: 9,691
Referee: Rubiel Vazquez

== Attendance ==
| Club | GP | Total | High | Low | Average | Change |
|---|---|---|---|---|---|---|
| Indy Eleven | 16 | 134,319 | 9,072 | 7,124 | 8,395 | -0% |
| Miami FC | 16 | 82,746 | 9,515 | 1,529 | 5,172 | -4.7% |
| New York Cosmos | 17 | 83,140 | 6,734 | 2,240 | 4,891 | 29.6% |
| North Carolina FC | 16 | 71,539 | 7,344 | 3,388 | 4,471 | -11.6% |
| FC Edmonton | 16 | 54,525 | 4,096 | 2,231 | 3,408 | 65.4% |
| Puerto Rico FC | 11* | 37,411 | 5,692 | 2,345 | 3,401 | -10.5% |
| Jacksonville Armada | 16 | 48,562 | 7,611 | 780 | 3,035 | -13.3% |
| San Francisco Deltas | 15† | 38,629 | 4,755 | 1,441 | 2,575 | N/A |
| Total | 123 | 550,871 | 9,515 | 780 | 4,479 | -5.4% |

* Five home games moved to other venues due to Hurricane Maria.
^{†} One result missing. That game was rescheduled at an alternate venue. There was no admission charged and no attendance figure given.
Source: NASL & kenn.com

== Statistical leaders ==
=== Top scorers ===
| Rank | Player | Nation | Club | Goals |
|---|---|---|---|---|
| 1 | Stefano Pinho | BRA | Miami FC | 17 |
| 2 | Vincenzo Rennella | FRA | Miami FC | 11 |
| 2 | Éamon Zayed | LBA | Indy Eleven | 11 |
| 4 | Jaime Chavez | USA | Miami FC | 10 |
| 4 | Emmanuel Ledesma | ARG | New York Cosmos | 10 |
| 6 | Jack Blake | SCO | Jacksonville Armada | 9 |
| 6 | Tom Heinemann | USA | San Francisco Deltas | 9 |
| 8 | Lance Laing | JAM | North Carolina FC | 8 |
| 8 | Dylan Mares | USA | Miami FC | 8 |
| 8 | Zach Steinberger | USA | Jacksonville Armada | 8 |

=== Top assists ===
| Rank | Player | Nation | Club | Assists |
|---|---|---|---|---|
| 1 | Jaime Chavez | USA | Miami FC | 9 |
| 2 | Andrés Flores | SLV | New York Cosmos | 8 |
| 3 | Emmanuel Ledesma | ARG | New York Cosmos | 6 |
| 3 | Vincenzo Rennella | FRA | Miami FC | 6 |
| 5 | Justin Braun | USA | Indy Eleven | 5 |
| 5 | Marco Franco | USA | Indy Eleven | 5 |
| 5 | Ayoze | ESP | New York Cosmos | 5 |
| 5 | Giuseppe Gentile | USA | Puerto Rico FC | 5 |
| 5 | Dylan Mares | USA | Miami FC | 5 |
| 5 | Ariel Martínez | CUB | Miami FC | 5 |
| 5 | Blake Smith | USA | Miami FC | 5 |
| 5 | Ben Speas | USA | Indy Eleven | 5 |

=== Clean sheets ===
| Rank | Player | Nation | Club | Clean sheets |
|---|---|---|---|---|
| 1 | Mario Daniel Vega | ARG | Miami FC | 15 |
| 2 | Romuald Peiser | FRA | San Francisco Deltas | 12 |
| 3 | Caleb Patterson-Sewell | USA | Jacksonville Armada | 10 |
| 4 | Jon Busch | USA | Indy Eleven | 6 |
| 4 | Jimmy Maurer | USA | New York Cosmos | 6 |
| 4 | Brian Sylvestre | HAI | North Carolina FC | 6 |
| 7 | Trevor Spangenberg | USA | Puerto Rico FC | 5 |
| 8 | Brian Holt | USA | New York Cosmos | 2 |
| 8 | Tyson Farago | CAN | FC Edmonton | 2 |
| 8 | Austin Pack | USA | Puerto Rico FC | 2 |

=== Hat-tricks ===
| Player | Nation | Club | Against | Result | Date |
|---|---|---|---|---|---|
| Stefano Pinho | BRA | Miami FC | San Francisco Deltas | 7–0 | July 8 |
| Jaime Chavez | USA | Miami FC | New York Cosmos | 3–3 | September 6 |
| Emmanuel Ledesma | ARG | New York Cosmos | Puerto Rico FC | 5–2 | October 28 |

Scored four goals.

== Awards ==
=== Weekly awards ===
| Week | NASL Player of the Week | | NASL Play of the Week | |
| Week | Player | Club | Player | Club |
|---|---|---|---|---|
| Week 1 | (Canada) Kyle Bekker | San Francisco Deltas | (France) Romuald Peiser | San Francisco Deltas |
| Week 2 | (United States) Justin Braun | Indy Eleven | (United States) Ben Speas | Indy Eleven |
| Week 3 | (United States) Tom Heinemann | San Francisco Deltas | (Brazil) Pablo Dyego | San Francisco Deltas |
| Week 4 | (United States) Matthew Fondy | North Carolina FC | (Jamaica) Lance Laing | North Carolina FC |
| Week 5 | (Haiti) Brian Sylvestre | North Carolina FC | (United States) J. C. Banks | Jacksonville Armada |
| Week 6 | (Ghana) Kwadwo Poku | Miami FC | (Argentina) Emmanuel Ledesma | New York Cosmos |
| Week 7 | (Spain) Cristian Portilla | San Francisco Deltas | (United States) Zach Steinberger | Jacksonville Armada |
| Week 8 | (Jamaica) Lance Laing | North Carolina FC | (United States) Giuseppe Gentile | Puerto Rico FC |
| Week 9 | (United States) Zach Steinberger | Jacksonville Armada | (United States) Billy Schuler | North Carolina FC |
| Week 10 | (United States) Zach Steinberger | Jacksonville Armada | (South Africa) Tiyi Shipalane | North Carolina FC |
| Week 11 | (United States) Giuseppe Gentile | Puerto Rico FC | (Spain) Cristian Portilla | San Francisco Deltas |
| Week 12 | (Canada) Kyle Bekker | San Francisco Deltas | (United States) Billy Schuler | North Carolina FC |
| Week 13 | (France) Vincenzo Rennella | Miami FC | (Argentina) Emmanuel Ledesma | New York Cosmos |
| Week 14 | (United States) Jon Busch | Indy Eleven | (Canada) Nathan Ingham | FC Edmonton |
| Week 15 | (United States) Tom Heinemann | San Francisco Deltas | (United States) Billy Schuler | North Carolina FC |
| Week 16 | (Brazil) Stefano Pinho | Miami FC | (Cuba) Ariel Martínez | Miami FC |
| Week 17 | (Montenegro) Nemanja Vuković | Indy Eleven | (New Zealand) Craig Henderson | Indy Eleven |
| Week 18 | (El Salvador) Eric Calvillo | New York Cosmos | (Israel) Kobi Moyal | New York Cosmos |
| Week 19 | (Senegal) Abdoulaye Diakite | FC Edmonton | (Montenegro) Nemanja Vuković | Indy Eleven |
| Week 20 | (Brazil) Stefano Pinho | Miami FC | (Argentina) Emmanuel Ledesma | New York Cosmos |
| Week 21 | (Mexico) Gerardo Torrado | Indy Eleven | (Panama) Tony Taylor | Jacksonville Armada |
| Week 22 | (Scotland) Jack Blake | Jacksonville Armada | (England) Tomi Ameobi | FC Edmonton |
| Week 23 | (Brazil) Pablo Dyego | San Francisco Deltas | (United States) Jaime Chavez | Miami FC |
| Week 24 | (United States) Jaime Chavez | Miami FC | (Palestine) Nazmi Albadawi | North Carolina FC |
| Week 25 | (Republic of Ireland) Ciarán Kilduff | Jacksonville Armada | (Libya) Éamon Zayed | Indy Eleven |
| Week 26 | (United States) Devon Sandoval | San Francisco Deltas | (El Salvador) Dustin Corea | FC Edmonton |
| Week 27 | (Brazil) Renan Gorne | North Carolina FC | (Palestine) Nazmi Albadawi | North Carolina FC |
| Week 28 | (Libya) Éamon Zayed | Indy Eleven | (Jamaica) Don Smart | Indy Eleven |
| Week 29 | (United States) Bryan Burke | San Francisco Deltas | (Brazil) Stefano Pinho | Miami FC |
| Week 30 | (Scotland) Jack Blake | Jacksonville Armada | (United States) Eugene Starikov | New York Cosmos |
| Week 31 | (Argentina) Emmanuel Ledesma | New York Cosmos | (Argentina) Emmanuel Ledesma | New York Cosmos |

=== Monthly awards ===
| Month | NASL Player of the Month | | NASL Play of the Month | |
| Month | Player | Club | Player | Club |
|---|---|---|---|---|
| April | (United States) Justin Braun | Indy Eleven | (United States) Ben Speas | Indy Eleven |
| May | (United States) Zach Steinberger | Jacksonville Armada | (United States) Giuseppe Gentile | Puerto Rico FC |
| June | (Italy) Vincenzo Rennella | Miami FC | (Spain) Cristian Portilla | San Francisco Deltas |
| July | (El Salvador) Eric Calvillo | New York Cosmos | (Cuba) Ariel Martínez | Miami FC |
| August | (Scotland) Jack Blake | Jacksonville Armada | (Montenegro) Nemanja Vuković | Indy Eleven |
| September | (United States) Jaime Chavez | Miami FC | (Libya) Éamon Zayed | Indy Eleven |
| October | (Argentina) Emmanuel Ledesma | New York Cosmos | (Palestine) Nazmi Albadawi | North Carolina FC |

=== League awards ===
- Golden Ball (MVP): (Brazil) Stefano Pinho (Miami FC)
- Golden Boot: (Brazil) Stefano Pinho (Miami FC)
- Golden Glove: (Argentina) Mario Daniel Vega (Miami FC)
- Coach of the Year: (Canada) Marc Dos Santos (San Francisco Deltas)
- Goal of the Year: (United States) Zach Steinberger (Jacksonville Armada)
- Young (U23) Player of the Year: (Scotland) Jack Blake (Jacksonville Armada)
- Humanitarian of the Year: (United States) Austin da Luz (North Carolina FC)
- Fair Play Award: North Carolina FC

NASL Best XI
| Position | Player | Team |
|---|---|---|
| Goalkeeper | (Argentina) Mario Daniel Vega | Miami FC |
| Defense | (Brazil) Reiner Ferreira | San Francisco Deltas |
| Defense | (Canada) Mason Trafford | Miami FC |
| Defense | (Haiti) Mechack Jérôme | Jacksonville Armada |
| Defense | (United States) Connor Tobin | North Carolina FC |
| Midfield | (Argentina) Emmanuel Ledesma | New York Cosmos |
| Midfield | (Palestine) Nazmi Albadawi | North Carolina FC |
| Midfield | (Republic of Ireland) Richie Ryan | Miami FC |
| Midfield | (United States) Dylan Mares | Miami FC |
| Forward | (France) Vincenzo Rennella | Miami FC |
| Forward | (Brazil) Stefano Pinho | Miami FC |
