= 2018 North American Soccer League season =

Cancelled soccer season

The 2018 North American Soccer League season would have been the eighth season of the modern North American Soccer League (NASL), but was canceled after the league was denied a preliminary injunction to prevent the loss of their Division II status.

== League news ==
The previous season's champion was the San Francisco Deltas who defeated the New York Cosmos in Soccer Bowl 2017. The Deltas folded after the 2017 season, citing financial difficulty and the uncertainty surrounding the future of the league.

Prior to the 2017 season, the league's Division II status was downgraded by the United States Soccer Federation (USSF) to a provisional sanctioning after league membership decreased to less than the 12 required by the Federation. At the same time, the USSF also promoted the former Division III league, the United Soccer League (USL), to a provisional Division II sanctioning.

During the 2017 season, the NASL announced two more expansion teams in California: San Diego 1904 FC in San Diego and California United FC in Orange County. The additions would have brought the 2018 league members only up to 10, still short of the 12 required for Division II.

On September 5, 2017, the USSF announced the NASL would not be granted Division II sanctioning for the upcoming 2018 season. Two weeks later on September 19, the NASL announced it was filing an antitrust lawsuit against the USSF over the sanctioning. A federal judge denied the league's request for a mandatory injunction against the USSF to regain its Division II designation in November 2017.

Two weeks later on November 16, North Carolina FC left the league to join the USL. FC Edmonton and the San Francisco Deltas then announced they would cease professional operations citing the uncertainty about the divisional status of the league. Indy Eleven would also join the USL in January 2018.

Due to the continuing litigation in regards to its status with the USSF, the league announced a move to an international season in January 2018. The new schedule postponed the start of the season until August 2018. Following the postponement of the 2018 season, Jacksonville Armada FC and Miami FC announced they would launch teams in the lower division National Premier Soccer League for at least the spring portion of the 2018 season, but had not ruled out continuing in the NASL once the season begins.

On February 23, 2018, the appeals court denied that NASL a preliminary injunction to prevent the loss of their Division II sanctioning. Four days later, the NASL announced that it had canceled the 2018 season entirely and hoped to return for a 2019 season. Following that announcement, San Diego 1904 FC announced that it had withdrawn from the NASL the previous month and was looking to move to the USL for 2019 instead.

== Proposed 2018 clubs ==
Club	City	Stadium	Capacity	Founded	Joined
California United FC	Fullerton, California	Titan Stadium	10,000	2017	2018
Jacksonville Armada FC	Jacksonville, Florida	Hodges Stadium	9,400	2013	2015
Miami FC	Miami, Florida	Riccardo Silva Stadium	20,000	2015	2016
New York Cosmos	Brooklyn, New York	MCU Park	7,000	2010	Fall 2013
Puerto Rico FC	Bayamón, Puerto Rico	Juan Ramón Loubriel Stadium	22,000	2015	Fall 2016
San Diego 1904 FC	San Diego, California	Torero Stadium	6,000	2017	2018

== See also ==
- 2017 North American Soccer League season
