= Soccer Bowl 2017 =

Soccer match

- Event: Soccer Bowl
San Francisco Deltas	New York Cosmos
2	0
- Date: November 12, 2017
- Venue: Kezar Stadium, San Francisco, California
- Referee: Rubiel Vazquez
- Attendance: 9,691

NASL Championship Final 2017 is the North American Soccer League's postseason championship match of the 2017 season which determined the NASL Champion.

== Background ==
Miami FC and San Francisco Deltas finished 1st and 2nd respectively in both the Spring and Fall seasons by wide margins. Miami FC's regular season record (21 wins, 6 draws, 5 losses, 69 points) was the best in modern NASL history. The New York Cosmos clinched the last playoff spot on the last day of the regular season. North Carolina FC also earned a spot in The Championship. Due to Hurricane Maria, Puerto Rico FC was forced to abandon Juan Ramón Loubriel Stadium for their last five home games, which were moved to other teams venues or to neutral sites. The rescheduled games raised money for hurricane relief.

== Path to the final ==
=== Semi-final #1 ===
Miami FC and New York Cosmos met four times during the regular season. They each won a game at the other's home stadium in the Spring season. The Cosmos won in New York and tied Miami in Miami during the Fall season.

November 5, 2017
5:00 pm EST

Miami FC	0–0 (a.e.t.)	New York Cosmos
Mares (yellow card) 56'	Report	Calvillo (yellow card) 24'; Ledesma (yellow card) 65'; Mendes (yellow card) 67'; Szetela (yellow card) 103'
Penalties
Michel (penalty missed); Poku (penalty scored); Martínez (penalty scored); Chavez (penalty scored); Pinho (penalty scored); Freeman (penalty scored); Trafford (penalty missed)	5–6	(penalty scored) García; (penalty scored) Szetela; (penalty scored) Calvillo; (penalty scored) Vranjicán; (penalty missed) Guerra; (penalty scored) Mkosana; (penalty scored) Starikov

Riccardo Silva Stadium, Miami, Florida
Attendance: 7,115
Referee: Marcos de Oliveira

=== Semi-final #2 ===
San Francisco Deltas and North Carolina FC met four times during the regular season. The Deltas won both their matches in the Spring season. The teams played to 1–1 ties in both Fall season games.

November 5, 2017
5:00 pm PST

San Francisco Deltas	1–0	North Carolina FC
Gibson 40'; Jordan (yellow card) 60'; Bekker (yellow card) 90'	Report

Kezar Stadium, San Francisco, California
Attendance: 3,586
Referee: Alex Chilowicz

== Match ==
=== Details ===
November 12, 2017
5:00 PM PST

San Francisco Deltas	2–0	New York Cosmos
Heinemann 19' (pen.); Sandoval 90+5'	Report; Report

Kezar Stadium, San Francisco, California
Attendance: 9,691
Referee: Rubiel Vazquez

San Francisco Deltas	New York Cosmos

2017 NASL Champions: San Francisco Deltas

San Francisco Deltas:
GK	1	(France) Romuald Peiser	(yellow card) 90'
DF	35	(Brazil) Reiner Ferreira
DF	20	(Canada) Karl Ouimette
DF	3	(Canada) Nana Attakora (c)		(substituted off) 65'
RWB	7	(Brazil) Jackson
MF	30	(United States) Michael Stephens		(substituted off) 75'
MF	4	(United States) Tyler Gibson	(yellow card) 24'
LWB	15	(Canada) Maxim Tissot
MF	23	(United States) Greg Jordan
MF	10	(Canada) Kyle Bekker
FW	9	(United States) Tom Heinemann	(yellow card) 31'	(substituted off) 90+2'
Substitutes:
FW	17	(United States) Devon Sandoval		(substituted on) 90+2'
DF	5	(Netherlands) Kenny Teijsse
GK	24	(United States) Alex Mangels
FW	21	(Brazil) Dagoberto
DF	6	(United States) Patrick Hopkins		(substituted on) 65'
MF	27	(United States) Andrew Lubahn
FW	11	(Brazil) Pablo Dyego		(substituted on) 75'
Manager: (Canada) Marc Dos Santos

New York Cosmos:
GK	1	(United States) Jimmy Maurer
DF	28	(United States) Jimmy Mulligan	(yellow card) 45+3'
DF	4	(United States) Carlos Mendes (c)
DF	5	(Canada) Dejan Jaković
DF	17	(Spain) Ayoze	(yellow card) 87'
MF	26	(United States) Eric Calvillo		(substituted off) 69'
MF	6	(Spain) Javi Márquez
MF	16	(Venezuela) Juan Francisco Guerra
MF	11	(El Salvador) Andrés Flores
MF	18	(Argentina) Emmanuel Ledesma		(substituted off) 88'
FW	27	(United States) Eugene Starikov		(substituted off) 90+3'
Substitutes:
GK	24	(United States) Brian Holt
DF	2	(United States) Ryan Richter
DF	3	(Kenya) David Ochieng
MF	14	(United States) Danny Szetela
MF	8	(Israel) Kobi Moyal		(substituted on) 90+3'
FW	31	(Argentina) Pablo Vranjicán		(substituted on) 88'
FW	77	(Zimbabwe) Lucky Mkosana		(substituted on) 69'
Manager: (Venezuela) Giovanni Savarese

MATCH OFFICIALS

- Assistant referees:
  - Jeffrey Greeson
  - Nick Uranga
- Fourth official: Ricardo Salazar
- Reserve official: Cameron Blanchard

=== Statistics ===
Overall	San Francisco	New York
Goals scored	2	0
Total shots	17	14
Shots on target	6	4
Ball possession	31%	69%
Corner kicks	3	13
Fouls committed	7	14
Offsides	1	3
Saves	4	3
Yellow cards	3	2
Red cards	0	0
