= Danny Cruz =

American soccer player

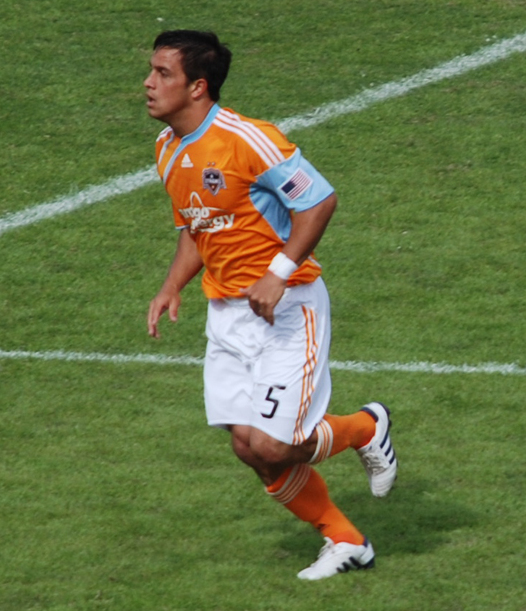
- Cruz playing for Houston Dynamo in 2010

Personal information
- Full name: Daniel Arthur Quimby Cruz
- Date of birth: January 3, 1990 (age 36)
- Place of birth: Petersburg, Virginia, United States
- Height: 5 ft 8 in (1.73 m)
- Position: Winger

College career
Years	Team	Apps	(Gls)
2007–2008	UNLV Rebels	31	(9)

Senior career*
Years	Team	Apps	(Gls)
2008	Des Moines Menace	7	(3)
2009–2011	Houston Dynamo	51	(4)
2012	D.C. United	16	(1)
2012–2015	Philadelphia Union	70	(7)
2015	→ Bodø/Glimt (loan)	15	(2)
2016	Minnesota United	24	(0)
2017	San Francisco Deltas	14	(1)
2017	Real Monarchs	8	(0)
Total		205	(18)

International career
2007	United States U17	3	(0)
2008–2009	United States U20	16	(2)

Managerial career
- 2018: Real Monarchs (assistant)
- 2018–2021: Louisville City (assistant)
- 2020–2021: Louisville City (technical director)
- 2021: Louisville City (interim)
- 2021–2026: Louisville City
- 2026–: Minnesota United FC (assistant)
Medal record
Representing United States
Runner-up	CONCACAF U-20 Championship	2009
- * Club domestic league appearances and goals

Daniel Arthur Quimby Cruz (born January 3, 1990) is an American soccer coach and former player who was most recently the head coach of USL Championship club Louisville City FC.

== Career ==
=== Youth and college ===
Cruz was born in Petersburg, Virginia. He attended junior high in Rohnert Park, California, and then moved to Glendale, Arizona, where he attended Ironwood High School, where he led his team to a 2006 State Championship. He played two years of college soccer at the University of Nevada-Las Vegas. He was the first UNLV player to earn MPSF Newcomer of the Year honors in his freshman year in 2007 and was named to the all-Mountain Pacific Sports Federation first team after scoring five goals in 2008.

During his college years he also played with Des Moines Menace in the USL Premier Development League.

=== Professional ===
Cruz was drafted in the third round (41st overall) of the 2009 MLS SuperDraft by the Houston Dynamo. He made his professional debut on March 28, 2009, coming on as a substitute in Houston's game against the San Jose Earthquakes. He scored his first goal for the Dynamo against DC United, he also had an assist in that game. In the 2011 season, Cruz was a big part of the Houston Dynamo team and scored a stunning goal at the end of the season against the Portland Timbers to help Houston get into the playoffs. He started in all four playoff games, including Houston's 1–0 loss to Los Angeles Galaxy in MLS Cup 2011.

In January 2012, Cruz was traded from Houston to D.C. United in exchange for allocation money.

On August 16, 2012, Cruz was traded to the Philadelphia Union in exchange for Lionard Pajoy and an international roster spot.

On March 19, 2015, Cruz signed a loan deal with FK Bodø/Glimt. He made his debut against Haugesund on April 30, 2015, in which Bodø/Glimt lost 1–2.

On February 15, 2017, Cruz signed with the San Francisco Deltas for their inaugural season in the NASL.

In August 2017, he joined Real Monarchs.

=== International ===
Cruz represented the United States at the FIFA U-17 World Cup in South Korea, the Pan American Games in Brazil in 2007, appeared in seven international games for the United States U-20 national team in 2008, and played in the FIFA U-20 World Cup in Egypt in 2009.

== Coaching career ==
=== Real Monarchs ===
In February 2018, Cruz was announced as promoted to assistant coach of the Monarchs for the 2018 season, under Mark Briggs.

=== Louisville City FC ===
On April 27, 2021, after spending time as an assistant coach and technical director at Louisville City FC, Cruz was appointed as interim head coach of the club, replacing John Hackworth. On October 11, Cruz was officially announced to have signed a multi-year agreement as the permanent head coach for Louisville.

== Career statistics ==
=== Club ===
As of July 12, 2015

Club performance			League		Cup		League Cup		Continental		Total	
Season	Club	League	Apps	Goals	Apps	Goals	Apps	Goals	Apps	Goals	Apps	Goals
United States			League		Open Cup		League Cup		North America		Total	
2009	Houston Dynamo	Major League Soccer	6	0	3	0	0	0	0	0	9	0
2010	Houston Dynamo	Major League Soccer	25	2	2	0	0	0	0	0	27	2
2011	Houston Dynamo	Major League Soccer	20	2	1	0	4	0	0	0	25	2
2012	D.C. United	Major League Soccer	16	1	0	0	0	0	0	0	16	1
2012	Philadelphia Union	Major League Soccer	12	1	0	0	0	0	0	0	12	1
2013	Philadelphia Union	Major League Soccer	32	3	1	0	0	0	0	0	33	3
2014	Philadelphia Union	Major League Soccer	26	3	5	0	0	0	0	0	31	3
Total	United States		137	12	12	0	4	0	0	0	153	12
Norway			League		Cup		League Cup		Champions League		Total	
2015	Bodø/Glimt	Tippeligaen	15	2	1	0	0	0	0	0	16	2
Total	Norway		15	2	1	0	0	0	0	0	16	2
Career total			152	14	13	0	4	0	0	0	169	14

== Honors ==
=== Player ===
San Francisco Deltas

- Soccer Bowl: 2017

=== Coach ===
Individual

- USL Championship Coach of the Year: 2024, 2025
- USL Championship Coach of the Month: August 2024
