= Maxim Tissot =

Canadian soccer player (born 1992)

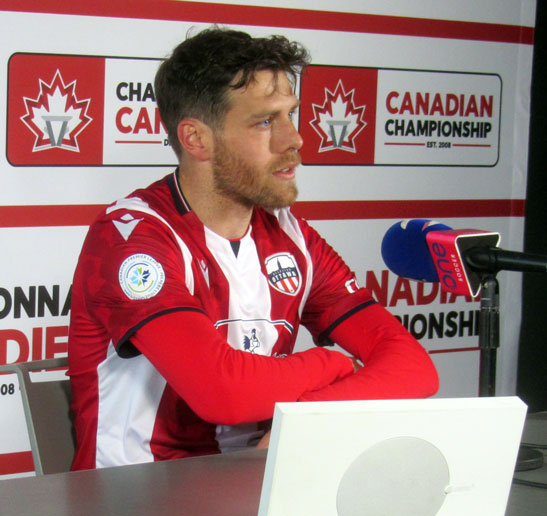
- Tissot in 2023

Personal information
- Date of birth: April 13, 1992 (age 34)
- Place of birth: Aylmer, Quebec, Canada
- Height: 1.80 m (5 ft 11 in)
- Positions: Left back; midfielder

Youth career
- CS Aylmer
- 2004–2008: FC Outaouais
- 2009–2013: Montreal Impact

Senior career*
| Years | Team | Apps | (Gls) |
| 2009 | Trois-Rivières Attak | 14 | (0) |
| 2010–2012 | Montreal Impact Academy | | |
| 2013–2016 | Montreal Impact | 44 | (5) |
| 2016 | → FC Montreal (loan) | 1 | (0) |
| 2016 | Ottawa Fury | 19 | (2) |
| 2017 | D.C. United | 1 | (0) |
| 2017 | → Richmond Kickers (loan) | 4 | (0) |
| 2017 | San Francisco Deltas | 20 | (0) |
| 2018–2019 | Ottawa Fury | 17 | (0) |
| 2020–2021 | Forge FC | 22 | (0) |
| 2022–2024 | Atlético Ottawa | 53 | (5) |

International career^{‡}
| 2015–2017 | Canada | 13 | (0) |
- * Club domestic league appearances and goals as of October 22, 2024 ‡ National team caps and goals as of March 22, 2017

Maxim Tissot (/tiːˈsoʊ/ tee-SOH; born April 13, 1992) is a Canadian former professional soccer player who played as a left-back.

== Club career ==
=== Early career ===
Tissot began playing in the Ligue de soccer élite du Québec in 2004 with FC Outaouais. In his debut season in the regional amateur circuit, he was named the club's most improved player. In his final run in the league, he was named to the league's all-star team in 2008.

In 2009, he signed with Trois-Rivières Attak in the inter-provincial Canadian Soccer League. Tissot would assist the club in securing their second divisional title. Their opponents in the opening round of the postseason were Portugal FC where they successfully defeated them in a two-game series. The club would reach the championship finals after defeating the Italia Shooters in the next round. Trois-Rivières would win the league championship after defeating the Serbian White Eagles in a penalty shootout. In his debut season in the CSL circuit, he appeared in 14 matches.

After the creation of the Montreal Impact Academy in 2010, he joined the senior academy team in the CSL's first division. Tissot returned for his second season with the academy in 2011. Throughout the 2011 campaign, he helped Montreal secure a playoff berth. Montreal would be eliminated from the playoff tournament in the first round by Capital City.

The 2012 season was his final run in the league. He would help Montreal secure another playoff berth by finishing second in the division. In the first round of the playoffs, they defeated Toronto FC's academy. Montreal would qualify for the championship finals after defeating the York Region Shooters. In the championship title match, the team was defeated by Toronto Croatia. After the conclusion of the season, he was named the league's top defender.

=== Montreal Impact ===
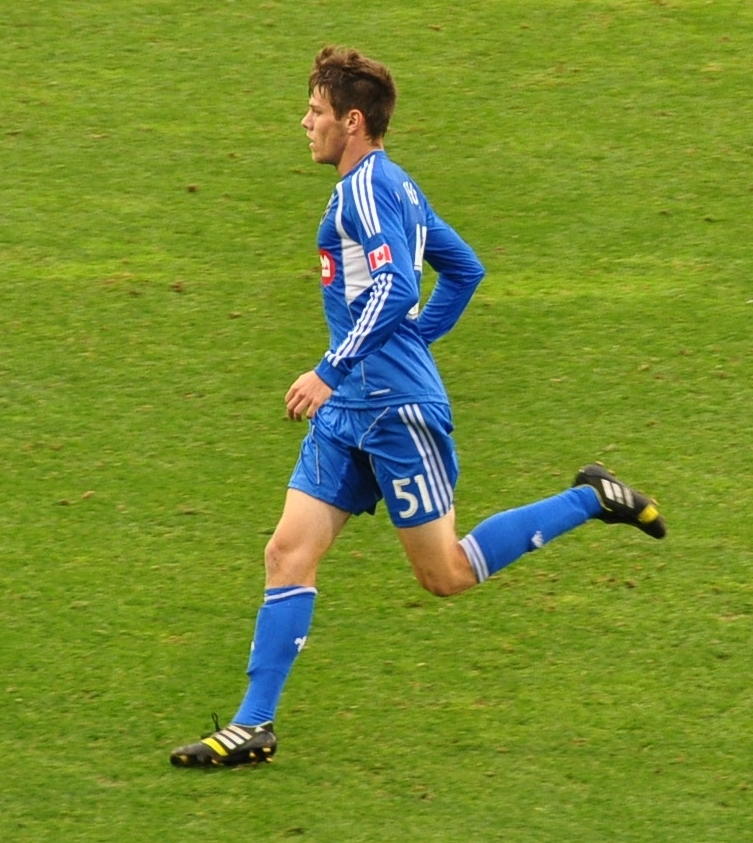
Tissot playing with the Montreal Impact Reserves in 2013

Tissot signed a professional contract with the Montreal Impact of Major League Soccer on February 26, 2013. Tissot then made his debut for the club on April 14, 2013, one day after his 21st birthday, against the Columbus Crew in which he came on in the 88th minute for Marco Di Vaio as the Impact drew the match 1–1. He then scored his first ever professional goal of his career on September 23, 2013, against the Chicago Fire in which he found the net in the 87th minute to tie up the score in a 2–2 match. He also made his debut on the continental level where he participated in the 2013–14 CONCACAF Champions League.

In 2014, he helped the Impact defeat Toronto FC to win the 2014 Canadian Championship which secured a berth in the 2014–15 CONCACAF Champions League. Tissot would assist Montreal in reaching the 2015 CONCACAF Champions League final where they were defeated by Club América. Throughout the tournament, he appeared in 7 matches.

Tissot would make an appearance in the USL Championship in 2016 with Montreal's reserve team. He would be waived by the Impact on June 28, 2016, to sign David Choinière to an MLS contract. Throughout his tenure with the senior Montreal team, he appeared in 44 league matches and recorded 5 goals.

=== Ottawa Fury ===
On July 14, 2016, Tissot signed with Ottawa Fury FC of the North American Soccer League. In December 2016, the Fury announced that Tissot would not return to the team as the club moved to USL in 2017.

=== D.C. United ===
On February 24, 2017, Tissot signed with D.C. United. He had his first start for United against the New England Revolution on April 22, 2017. Tissot was released from the team on May 8, 2017.

=== San Francisco Deltas ===
A day after being released by DC United, Tissot signed with San Francisco Deltas in the North American Soccer League. Tissot would win the 2017 Soccer Bowl with the Deltas in their inaugural season. The Deltas would cease operations three days after winning the Soccer Bowl, leaving Tissot to look for a new club.

=== Return to Ottawa ===
On January 10, 2018, Tissot returned to USL side Ottawa Fury FC for the 2018 season. Tissot would miss the bulk of the 2018 season due to multiple knee injuries. After the 2018 season, the Fury would announce that Tissot would return to the Fury for the 2019 season. After two seasons with the Fury, the club would cease operations for the 2020 season, making Tissot a free agent.

=== Forge FC ===
On July 22, 2020, Tissot signed with reigning Canadian Premier League champions Forge FC. He made his debut for The Hammers as a substitute on August 13 in the 2020 season opener against Cavalry FC.

=== Atlético Ottawa ===
On January 26, 2022, Tissot returned to Ottawa, signing a one-year contract with an option for 2023 with Atlético Ottawa. At the end of the 2024 season, he announced his retirement.

== International career ==
Tissot received his first call-up to Canada on November 6, 2014, for a friendly against Panama. Before this, he had no experience with the Canada national team program at any level. He, however, did not make an appearance during the match. Tissot would make his debut on January 16, 2015, in a friendly against Iceland. He was selected to represent the national team in the 2015 CONCACAF Gold Cup.

== Career statistics ==
=== Club ===
As of October 27, 2024

| Club | League | Season | League | | Playoffs | | National Cup | | Continental | | Total | |
| Club | League | Season | Apps | Goals | Apps | Goals | Apps | Goals | Apps | Goals | Apps | Goals |
|---|---|---|---|---|---|---|---|---|---|---|---|---|
| Montreal Impact | MLS | 2013 | 6 | 1 | 0 | 0 | 2 | 0 | 2 | 0 | 10 | 1 |
| Montreal Impact | MLS | 2014 | 20 | 2 | 0 | 0 | 3 | 0 | 3 | 0 | 26 | 2 |
| Montreal Impact | MLS | 2015 | 10 | 1 | 0 | 0 | 2 | 0 | 4 | 0 | 16 | 1 |
| Montreal Impact | MLS | 2016 | 7 | 1 | 0 | 0 | 0 | 0 | 0 | 0 | 7 | 1 |
| Montreal Impact | Total | | 44 | 5 | 0 | 0 | 7 | 0 | 9 | 0 | 60 | 5 |
| FC Montreal (loan) | USL | 2016 | 1 | 0 | — | | — | | — | | 1 | 0 |
| Ottawa Fury | NASL | 2016 | 19 | 2 | 0 | 0 | 0 | 0 | — | | 19 | 2 |
| D.C. United | MLS | 2017 | 1 | 0 | 0 | 0 | 0 | 0 | — | | 1 | 0 |
| Richmond Kickers (loan) | USL | 2017 | 4 | 0 | 0 | 0 | 0 | 0 | — | | 4 | 0 |
| San Francisco Deltas | NASL | 2017 | 20 | 0 | 2 | 0 | 2 | 0 | — | | 24 | 0 |
| Ottawa Fury | USL Championship | 2018 | 2 | 0 | 0 | 0 | 2 | 0 | — | | 4 | 0 |
| Ottawa Fury | USL Championship | 2019 | 15 | 0 | 0 | 0 | 3 | 1 | — | | 18 | 1 |
| Ottawa Fury | Total | | 17 | 0 | 0 | 0 | 5 | 1 | 0 | 0 | 22 | 1 |
| Forge FC | Canadian Premier League | 2020 | 10 | 0 | 1 | 1 | 0 | 0 | 3 | 0 | 14 | 1 |
| Forge FC | Canadian Premier League | 2021 | 12 | 0 | 1 | 0 | 0 | 0 | 5 | 0 | 18 | 0 |
| Forge FC | Total | | 22 | 0 | 2 | 1 | 0 | 0 | 8 | 0 | 32 | 1 |
| Atlético Ottawa | Canadian Premier League | 2022 | 27 | 3 | 3 | 0 | 1 | 0 | — | | 31 | 3 |
| Atlético Ottawa | Canadian Premier League | 2023 | 15 | 2 | — | | 1 | 1 | — | | 16 | 3 |
| Atlético Ottawa | Canadian Premier League | 2024 | 11 | 0 | 1 | 0 | 3 | 0 | — | | 15 | 0 |
| Atlético Ottawa | Total | | 53 | 5 | 4 | 0 | 5 | 1 | 0 | 0 | 62 | 6 |
| Career total | | | 184 | 12 | 8 | 1 | 19 | 2 | 17 | 0 | 228 | 15 |

=== International ===
As of July 22, 2020

Canada national team
| Year | Apps | Goals |
|---|---|---|
| 2015 | 8 | 0 |
| 2016 | 3 | 0 |
| 2017 | 2 | 0 |
| Total | 13 | 0 |

== Honours ==
Trois-Rivières Attak

- CSL Championship: 2009
- Canadian Soccer League National Division: 2009

Montreal Impact Academy

- CSL Championship Runners-up: 2012

Montreal Impact

- Canadian Championship: 2013, 2014

San Francisco Deltas

- NASL Championship: 2017

Forge

- Canadian Premier League: 2020

Atlético Ottawa

- Canadian Premier League Regular Season: 2022

Individual

- Canadian Soccer League Defender of the Year: 2012
