= Maxime Bourgeois =

French footballer (born 1991)

Personal information
- Full name: Maxime Bourgeois
- Date of birth: 3 February 1991 (age 35)
- Place of birth: Sucy-en-Brie, France
- Height: 1.83 m (6 ft 0 in)
- Position: Winger

Team information
- Current team: Thonon Evian

Youth career
- 1996–1997: FC Brunoy
- 1997–2003: ASPTT Villecresnes
- 2003–2005: Créteil
- 2005–2009: Auxerre

Senior career*
Years	Team	Apps	(Gls)
2009–2013	Auxerre	31	(0)
2011–2012	→ Châteauroux (loan)	33	(9)
2013	Châteauroux	34	(5)
2014–2015	Laval	16	(1)
2015–2016	Créteil	4	(0)
2017	San Francisco Deltas	0	(0)
2017–2018	Andrézieux	18	(5)
2018	Sedan	3	(0)
2019	Fleury	4	(1)
2019–	Thonon Evian	14+ (Note: Statistics are missing for the 2019–20 season.)	(5+)

International career
2007–2008	France U17	4	(0)
2009–2010	France U19	3	(1)
2010–2011	France U20	10	(2)
- * Club domestic league appearances and goals as of 23:38, 9 June 2022 (UTC)

Maxime Bourgeois (born 3 February 1991) is a French professional footballer who plays as a winger for Championnat National 1 club Thonon Evian. He is a former France youth international.

== Club career ==
=== Early career ===
Bourgeois began his career, at age 5, playing for his hometown club FC Brunoy. After spending a year at the club, he moved to nearby commune Villecresnes joining ASPTT Villecresnes. Bourgeois performed well at the club and, as a result, drew interest from professional club US Créteil-Lusitanos, who offered the player a spot in their youth academy. After discussing the move, Bourgeois's parents denied the move with efforts to keep the young player close to home. After two more years at Villecresnes, he was allowed move to Créteil. Despite enduring struggles early on at Créteil, Bourgeois became one of the club's most sought after prospects. After two years at the club, he had generated interest from Ligue 1 clubs Paris Saint-Germain, Lille, Strasbourg, and Monaco. He was later spotted by another Ligue 1 club, Auxerre, following a youth tournament. With Auxerre being close to his hometown Brunoy and the club's youth system being nationally recognized, Bourgeois agreed to the move signing a four-year aspirant (youth) contract until the age of 18.

=== Auxerre ===
Bourgeois initially started with the club's under-16 team. His consistent play saw him promoted to the under-18 team for the 2008–09 season. Following the season, he was promoted to the club's CFA team and made his debut on 8 August 2009 playing 59 minutes in a 1–1 draw with Mantes. He scored his first CFA goal on 30 August against La Vitréenne scoring the equalising goal in the 69th minute. The following week, he scored again, this time against Quimper Cornouaille. Auxerre won the match 2–1. Because of his successful play in the reserves, on 16 October, Auxerre manager Jean Fernandez called the player up for their league match against Bordeaux. He didn't feature in the match, but later made the bench against Paris Saint-Germain in November. Bourgeois did make his professional debut in that match appearing as a substitute in the 87th minute for Aurélien Capoue. Auxerre lost the match 1–0.

=== Later career ===
Left free by Sedan, Bourgeois moved to Fleury in January 2019.

In the summer 2019, Bourgeois joined Thonon Evian.

== Honours ==
Thonon Evian

- Championnat National 3: 2021–22
- Régional 1 Auvergne-Rhône-Alpes: 2019–20
