= Dagoberto (Brazilian footballer) =

Brazilian footballer (born 1983)

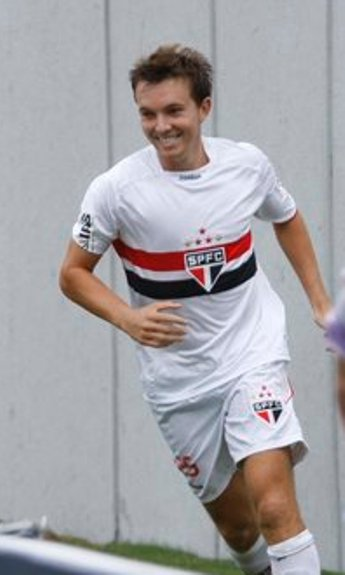
- Dagoberto with São Paulo in 2010

Personal information
- Full name: Dagoberto Pelentier
- Date of birth: 22 March 1983 (age 43)
- Place of birth: Dois Vizinhos, Brazil
- Height: 1.75 m (5 ft 9 in)
- Position: Forward

Youth career
- 2000–2001: Atlético Paranaense

Senior career*
Years	Team	Apps	(Gls)
2001–2006	Atlético Paranaense	108	(45)
2007–2011	São Paulo	140	(35)
2012–2013	Internacional	19	(6)
2013–2015	Cruzeiro	43	(7)
2015	→ Vasco da Gama (loan)	9	(0)
2016	Vitória	17	(0)
2017	San Francisco Deltas	13	(3)
2018–2019	Londrina	24	(19)

International career
2003	Brazil U20	15	(7)
2004	Brazil U23	6	(1)
- * Club domestic league appearances and goals

Dagoberto Pelentier (born 22 March 1983) simply known as Dagoberto, is a Brazilian retired professional footballer who played as a forward.

== Club career ==
Born in Dois Vizinhos, Dagoberto formerly played for Atlético-PR, São Paulo and Internacional. He signed for Cruzeiro in January 2013.

On 3 March 2015, Dagoberto was loaned to Vasco da Gama until the end of the 2015 season.

On 29 June 2017, it was announced that Dagoberto signed with the San Francisco Deltas for the remainder of the 2017 NASL season.

On 10 September 2019, he announced that he had retired from football at the age of 36.

== International career ==
Dagoberto has represented Brazil at Under-20 and Under-23 levels. He was a member of Brazil U-20 squad which won the FIFA World Youth Championship in 2003.
