= Pablo Dyego =

Brazilian footballer

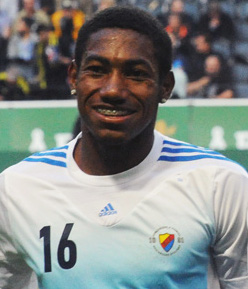
- Dyego playing for Djurgården in 2013.

Personal information
- Full name: Pablo Dyego da Silva Rosa
- Date of birth: 8 March 1994 (age 32)
- Place of birth: Rio de Janeiro, Brazil
- Height: 1.74 m (5 ft 9 in)
- Position: Winger

Team information
- Current team: Londrina
- Number: 11

Youth career
- 2011–2014: Fluminense

Senior career*
| Years | Team | Apps | (Gls) |
| 2013–2021 | Fluminense | 31 | (2) |
| 2013 | → Djurgården (loan) | 1 | (0) |
| 2015 | → Legia Warsaw (loan) | 0 | (0) |
| 2015 | → Legia Warsaw II (loan) | 9 | (2) |
| 2016 | → Ottawa Fury (loan) | 0 | (0) |
| 2017 | → San Francisco Deltas (loan) | 29 | (6) |
| 2020–2021 | → CRB (loan) | 17 | (4) |
| 2021 | → Atlético Goianiense (loan) | 10 | (0) |
| 2021 | → CRB (loan) | 21 | (4) |
| 2022 | Vila Nova | 28 | (4) |
| 2022 | Avaí | 10 | (0) |
| 2023 | Ponte Preta | 29 | (10) |
| 2024 | Sport Recife | 14 | (0) |
| 2024–2025 | Novorizontino | 46 | (8) |
| 2026– | São Bernardo | 11 | (2) |
| 2026– | Londrina | 17 | (0) |
- * Club domestic league appearances and goals as of 18 November 2026

Pablo Dyego da Silva Rosa (born 8 March 1994), known as Pablo Dyego, is a Brazilian professional footballer who plays for Londrina. Mainly a right winger, he can also play as a right-back.

== Club career ==
Dyego is a youth product of Fluminense academy.

During the 2013 pre-season, he signed for Djurgårdens IF on loan. Pablo made his Djurgårdens IF debut in Allsvenskan on 4 May 2013 against Åtvidabergs IF.

On 19 June 2015, Dyego joined Polish Ekstraklasa club Legia Warsaw on season-long loan.

On 2 March 2016, Dyego signed with Canadian club Ottawa Fury on a season-long loan.

On 6 February 2017, Diego joined San Francisco Deltas on loan.

== Career statistics ==
As of 10 November 2021

Appearances and goals by club, season and competition
| Club | Season | League | | | State League | | National Cup | | Continental | | Other | | Total | |
| Club | Season | Division | Apps | Goals | Apps | Goals | Apps | Goals | Apps | Goals | Apps | Goals | Apps | Goals |
|---|---|---|---|---|---|---|---|---|---|---|---|---|---|---|
| Djurgårdens IF | 2013 | Allsvenskan | 1 | 0 | — | | 0 | 0 | — | | — | | 1 | 0 |
| Legia Warsaw | 2015–16 | Ekstraklasa | 0 | 0 | — | | 1 | 0 | 1 (Note: Appearance(s) in UEFA Europa League) | 0 | — | | 2 | 0 |
| Ottawa Fury | 2016 | NASL | 0 | 0 | — | | 0 | 0 | — | | — | | 0 | 0 |
| San Francisco Deltas | 2017 | NASL | 27 | 6 | — | | 1 | 0 | — | | 2 (Note: Appearance(s) in NASL play-offs) | 0 | 30 | 6 |
| Fluminense | 2018 | Série A | 11 | 2 | 8 | 0 | 0 | 0 | 3 (Note: Appearance(s) in Copa Sudamericana) | 1 | — | | 22 | 3 |
| Fluminense | 2019 | Série A | 9 | 0 | 1 | 0 | 0 | 0 | 3 | 1 | — | | 13 | 1 |
| Fluminense | 2020 | Série A | 0 | 0 | 2 | 0 | 0 | 0 | 0 | 0 | — | | 2 | 0 |
| Fluminense | Total | | 20 | 2 | 11 | 0 | 0 | 0 | 6 | 2 | — | | 37 | 4 |
| CRB | 2020 | Série B | 17 | 4 | — | | — | | — | | — | | 17 | 4 |
| Atlético Goianiense | 2021 | Série A | 4 | 0 | 6 | 0 | 3 | 0 | 3 | 0 | — | | 16 | 0 |
| CRB | 2021 | Série B | 17 | 3 | — | | — | | — | | — | | 17 | 3 |
| Career total | | | 86 | 15 | 17 | 0 | 5 | 0 | 10 | 2 | 2 | 0 | 119 | 17 |

== Honours ==
Legia Warsaw

- Polish Cup: 2015–16

San Francisco Deltas

- North American Soccer League: 2017
