= Devon Sandoval =

American soccer player (born 1991)

Personal information
- Full name: Devon Sandoval
- Date of birth: June 16, 1991 (age 35)
- Place of birth: Albuquerque, New Mexico, United States
- Height: 1.86 m (6 ft 1 in)
- Position: Forward

College career
Years	Team	Apps	(Gls)
2009	San Diego State Aztecs	7	(1)
2010–2012	New Mexico Lobos	64	(26)

Senior career*
Years	Team	Apps	(Gls)
2013–2016	Real Salt Lake	74	(7)
2014	→ Carolina RailHawks (loan)	3	(1)
2015–2016	→ Real Monarchs (loan)	5	(1)
2016	→ Rayo OKC (loan)	12	(1)
2017	San Francisco Deltas	30	(4)
2018	Atlanta United 2	25	(3)
2019–2022	New Mexico United	83	(21)
Total		232	(38)
- * Club domestic league appearances and goals as of October 21, 2022

Devon Sandoval (born June 16, 1991) is an American former professional soccer player who played as a forward.

== Early career ==
The son of Diana and Greg Sandoval and native of Albuquerque, Sandoval attended Eldorado High School in New Mexico, where he played soccer. He continued his education and soccer career at San Diego State University, but remained there only until his freshman year. He then transferred to the University of New Mexico, where he would spend the remainder of his three college years.

== Professional career ==
=== Major League Soccer ===
Sandoval was selected by Real Salt Lake in the second round (29th overall) of the 2013 MLS SuperDraft. On March 3, 2013, Sandoval made his professional soccer debut with Real Salt Lake against the San Jose Earthquakes in their opening day game for the 2013 Major League Soccer season. He came on as a substitute in the 87th minute for the Man of the Match, Álvaro Saborío, who scored two goals to lead the club to a 2–0 victory. He scored his first goal for Salt Lake in an away game against the New England Revolution on May 8, 2013. During a Lamar Hunt U.S. Open Cup round match against the NASL's (North American Soccer League) Atlanta Silverbacks in Rio Tinto Stadium on May 28, 2013, Sandoval scored an overtime goal, assisted by teammates Javier Morales and Joao Plata to help Real Salt Lake clinch a 3–2 victory and advanced to the fourth round of the tournament. On June 12, 2013, Sandoval scored twice (once in overtime) against the Charleston Battery to help Real Salt Lake win 5–2 and advance to the Lamar Hunt U.S. Open Cup quarterfinals. With Alvaro Saborio injured, Sandoval got the start in RSL's home leg against the Portland Timbers in the 2013 Western Conference Finals, and scored the team's third goal on an assist from Robbie Findley. RSL won the game 4–2.

=== NASL and USL ===
Sandoval was sent on a two-game loan deal to NASL club Carolina RailHawks on September 10, 2014. On May 22, 2015, Sandoval won MLS Goal of the Week for a goal scored against the Montreal Impact on May 16, 2015. On 13 July 2016, Sandoval was loaned to Rayo OKC, where he played the NASL Autumn Regular Season and Playoffs. Sandoval and Rayo OKC advanced to the NASL semi-finals before losing to the eventual NASL Champions, New York Cosmos.

On January 30, 2017, the San Francisco Deltas of the NASL announced Sandoval had signed with the team. On February 15, 2017, Sandoval scored the winning goal in the Delta's pre-season 1–0 win over the MLS San Jose Earthquakes. On November 12, 2017, Sandoval was subbed into the 90th minute in the 2017 NASL finals against the New York Cosmos. Sandoval would go on to score a late goal in stoppage time to put the Deltas up 2–0, over the Cosmos.

On March 22, 2018, Sandoval joined Atlanta United 2 of the United Soccer League.

=== New Mexico United ===
On June 6, 2018, Sandoval was named as the first player to sign with the newly formed USL side New Mexico United ahead of their inaugural 2019 season. On March 9, 2019, he scored the team's first-ever goal in their opening match against Fresno FC.

On October 10, 2019, Sandoval was voted the USL Championship Player of the Month for September.

Sandoval announced his retirement from professional soccer on January 17, 2023.

== Career statistics ==
As of match played October 9, 2021

Appearances and goals by club, season and competition
Club	Season	League			Domestic Cup		League Cup		Continental		Total	
Club	Season	Division	Apps	Goals	Apps	Goals	Apps	Goals	Apps	Goals	Apps	Goals
Real Salt Lake	2013	MLS	17	3	3 (Note: Appearance(s) in U.S. Open Cup)	3	3 (Note: Appearance(s) in MLS Cup playoffs)	1	—		23	7
Real Salt Lake	2014	MLS	15	0	1	0	0	0	—		16	0
Real Salt Lake	2015	MLS	30	4	3	0	—		3 (Note: Appearances in CONCACAF Champions League)	0	36	4
Real Salt Lake	2016	MLS	12	0	1	0	0	0	0	0	13	0
Real Salt Lake	Total		74	7	8	3	3	1	3	0	88	11
Real Salt Lake Reserves	2013	MLS Reserve League	12	4	—		—		—		12	4
Real Salt Lake Reserves	2014	MLS Reserve League	3	2	—		—		—		3	2
Real Salt Lake Reserves	Total		15	6	0	0	0	0	0	0	15	6
Carolina Railhawks (loan)	2014	NASL	3	1	0	0	—		—		3	1
Real Monarchs (loan)	2015	USL	1	0	0	0	—		—		1	0
Real Monarchs (loan)	2016	USL	4	1	—		—		—		4	1
Real Monarchs (loan)	Total		5	1	0	0	0	0	0	0	5	1
Rayo OKC (loan)	2016	NASL	12	1	0	0	1 (Note: Appearance(s) in Soccer Bowl (2011-2017))	0	—		13	1
San Francisco Deltas	2017	NASL	30	4	2	0	2	1	—		34	5
Atlanta United 2	2018	USL	25	3	—		—		—		25	3
New Mexico United	2019	USL Championship	31	12	5	3	1 (Note: Appearance(s) in USL playoffs)	1	—		37	16
New Mexico United	2020	USL Championship	12	4	—		2	0	—		14	4
New Mexico United	2021	USL Championship	28	5	—		—		—		28	5
New Mexico United	Total		71	21	5	3	3	1	0	0	79	25
Career total			235	44	15	6	9	3	3	0	246	49

== Honors ==
San Francisco Deltas

- NASL Championship: 2017
