= Reiner Ferreira =

Brazilian footballer

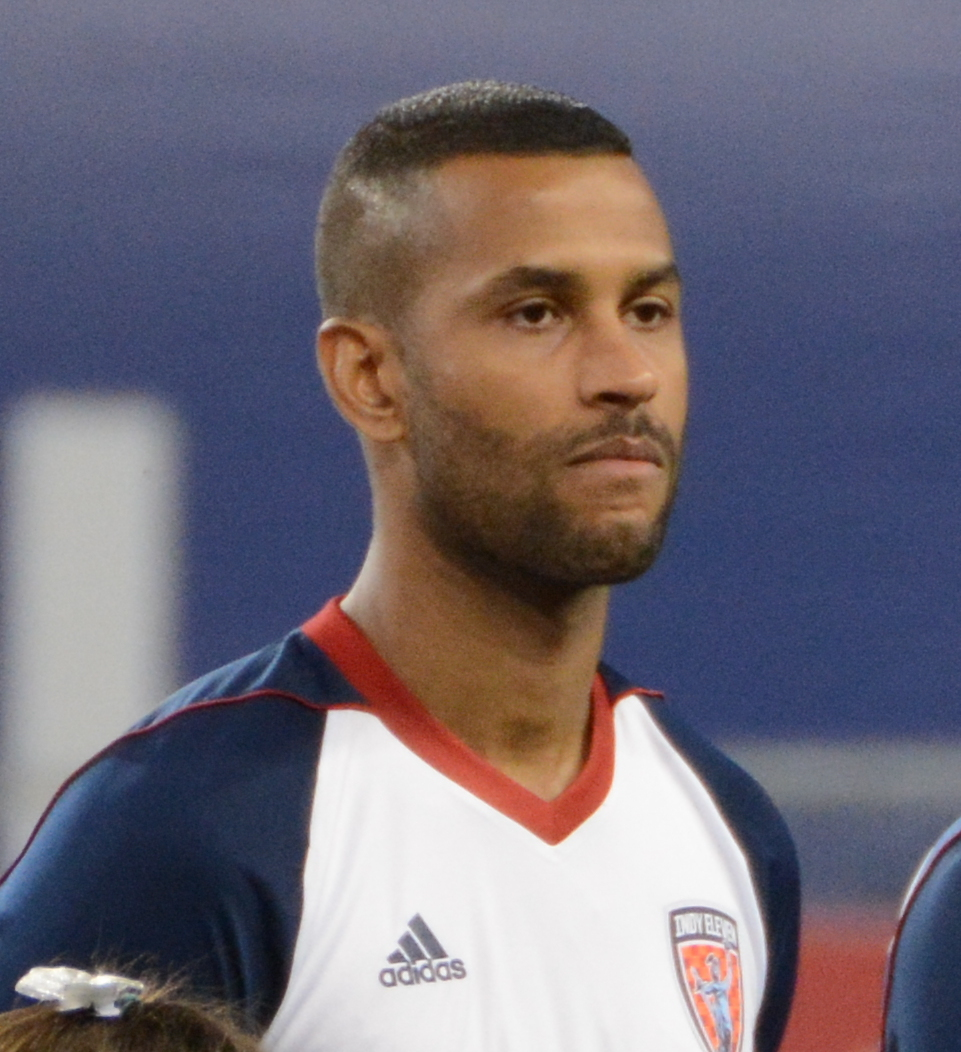
- Ferreira with Indy Eleven in 2018

Personal information
- Full name: Reiner Ferreira Correa Gomes
- Date of birth: 17 November 1985 (age 40)
- Place of birth: São Paulo, Brazil
- Height: 1.85 m (6 ft 1 in)
- Position: Defender

Team information
- Current team: Boa

Senior career*
Years	Team	Apps	(Gls)
2006–2007	Assisense		
2007	Juventude MT		
2007–2008	Anápolis		
2008	Paranavaí		
2008	Criciúma	2	(0)
2008–2009	Al Wasl		
2009–2010	America (RJ)		
2010–2011	Juventude	5	(0)
2011	Guarani	0	(0)
2011–2012	ASA	10	(0)
2012–2014	Académica	36	(0)
2014	Suwon Bluewings	17	(0)
2015	Santa Rita	7	(0)
2015–2016	Adana Demirspor	29	(1)
2017	San Francisco Deltas	31	(2)
2018	Indy Eleven	17	(1)
2019–	Boa	0	(0)
- * Club domestic league appearances and goals as of 11 March 2019

Reiner Ferreira Correa Gomes (born 17 November 1985) is a Brazilian professional footballer who currently plays for Boa Esporte Clube.

Previously Ferreira played in the Portuguese Primeira Liga for Académica and for various clubs in his native country at levels up to Série B.

== Career statistics ==
=== Club ===
As of match played 20 October 2018

Appearances and goals by club, season and competition
Club	Season	League			National Cup		League Cup		Continental		Other		Total	
Club	Season	Division	Apps	Goals	Apps	Goals	Apps	Goals	Apps	Goals	Apps	Goals	Apps	Goals
Criciúma	2008	Série B	2	0	0	0	–		–		–		2	0
Juventude	2010	Campeonato Gaúcho	5	0	0	0	–		–		–		5	0
Guarani	2011	Campeonato Mineiro	0	0	0	0	–		–		–		0	0
ASA	2011	Série B	10	0	2	0	–		–		–		12	0
Académica	2011–12	Primeira Liga	7	0	0	0	0	0	–		–		7	0
Académica	2012–13	Primeira Liga	21	0	2	0	4	0	3	0	1	0	31	0
Académica	2013–14	Primeira Liga	8	0	2	0	0	0	–		–		10	0
Académica	Total		36	0	4	0	4	0	3	0	1	0	48	0
Suwon Samsung Bluewings	2014	K League Classic	17	0	0	0	–		–		–		17	0
Santa Rita	2015	Campeonato Alagoano	7	0	0	0	–		–		–		7	0
Adana Demirspor	2015–16	TFF First League	29	1	1	0	–		–		–		30	1
San Francisco Deltas	2017	NASL	31	2	3	1	–		–		2	0	36	3
Indy Eleven	2018	USL	16	1	0	0	–		–		1 (Note: Appearance in the USL Playoffs)	0	17	1
Career total			153	4	10	1	4	0	3	0	4	0	174	5

== Honours ==
=== Club ===
San Francisco Deltas:

- Soccer Bowl: 2017
