= Kenny Teijsse =

Dutch footballer (born 1992)

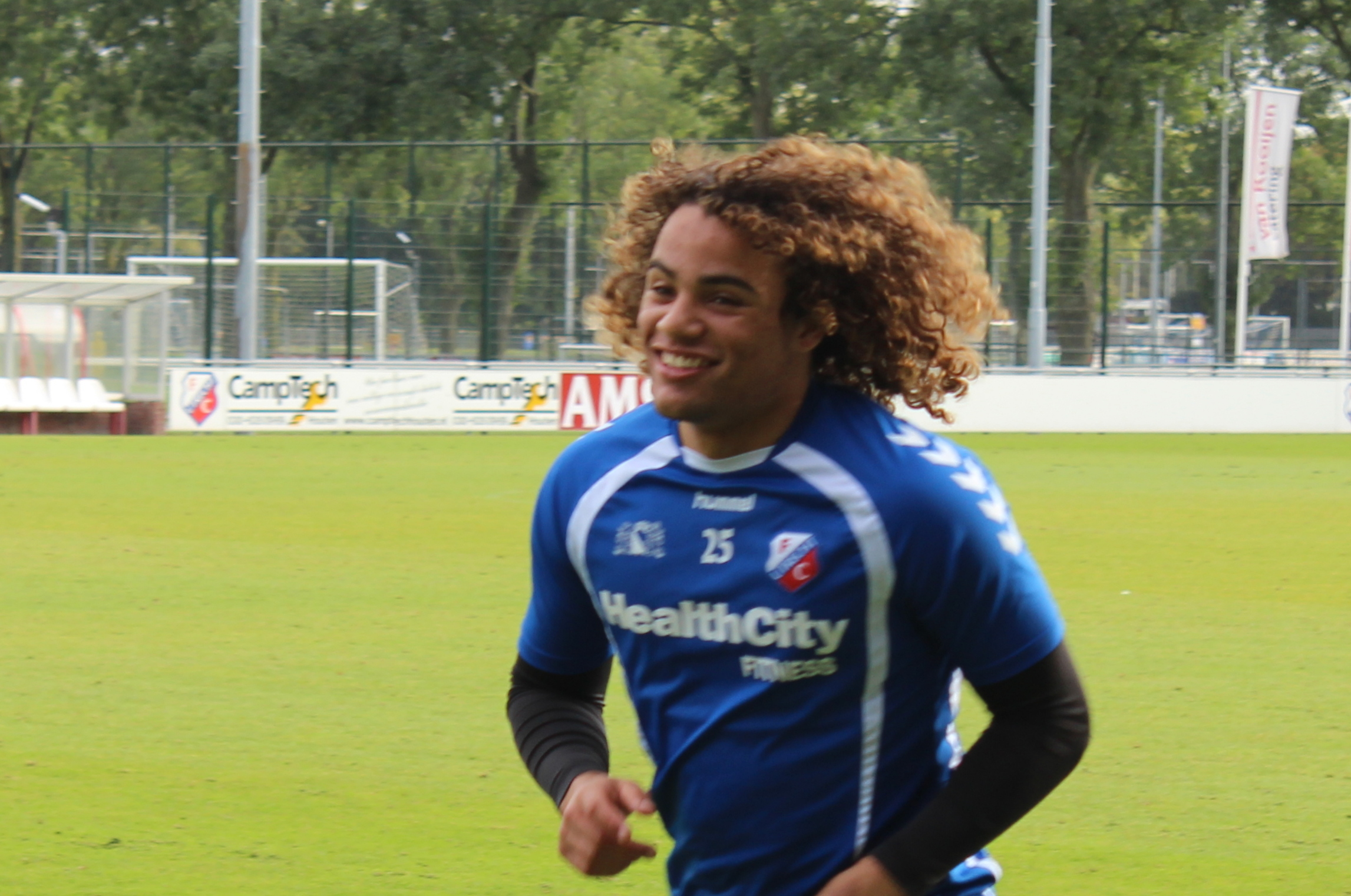
- Teijsse in 2013

Personal information
- Date of birth: 19 July 1992 (age 34)
- Place of birth: Amsterdam, Netherlands
- Height: 1.82 m (6 ft 0 in)
- Position: Midfielder

Team information
- Current team: VV Unicum

Youth career
- AFC
- DWS
- Utrecht

Senior career*
Years	Team	Apps	(Gls)
2012–2015	Utrecht	1	(0)
2013	→ FC Oss (loan)	13	(3)
2014	→ Helmond Sport (loan)	10	(2)
2014–2015	→ Sparta Rotterdam (loan)	32	(5)
2015–2017	Go Ahead Eagles	38	(5)
2017	San Francisco Deltas	23	(2)
2018	Cambuur	1	(0)
2018–2022	AFC	96	(21)
2023–	VV Unicum		
- * Club domestic league appearances and goals as of 21:24, 7 February 2025 (UTC)

Kenny Teijsse (born 19 July 1992) is a Dutch professional footballer who plays as a midfielder for VV Unicum.

He formerly played for FC Utrecht and on loan for both FC Oss, Helmond Sport and also Go Ahead Eagles in the Dutch Eredivisie.

His twin brother, Yordi Teijsse, is also a professional footballer.
