= Bryan Burke =

American soccer player (born 1989)

Personal information
- Full name: Bryan Burke
- Date of birth: January 3, 1989 (age 37)
- Place of birth: Newport Beach, California, United States
- Height: 1.87 m (6 ft 2 in)
- Position: Defender

Youth career
- 2007–2010: San Francisco Dons

Senior career*
Years	Team	Apps	(Gls)
2007–2010	Orange County Blue Star	29	(4)
2011	Kitsap Pumas	11	(4)
2012	Los Angeles Blues	19	(3)
2013–2014	Orlando City	26	(3)
2015	Louisville City	28	(1)
2016	Jacksonville Armada	15	(0)
2017	San Francisco Deltas	13	(3)
2018	Oakland Leopards		
- * Club domestic league appearances and goals as of 09:51, 30 October 2017 (UTC)

Bryan Burke (born January 3, 1989) is an American soccer player who last played professionally for San Francisco Deltas in the North American Soccer League.

== Youth ==
Burke was born and raised in Newport Beach, California and played at the collegiate level for the University of San Francisco Dons from 2007 to 2010.

== Professional ==
After college, he played in the USL Premier Development League for the Kitsap Pumas in 2011, winning the most valuable player award and earning an appearance in the PDL Championship in his first season. After playing for the Orange County Blues in 2012, he went on trial with Sporting Kansas City and the San Jose Earthquakes before signing with Orlando City.

Burke made 15 match appearances in 2013, tallying two goals and four assists. On July 5, 2013, he sustained a season-ending injury against the Charleston Battery. Burke re-signed with Orlando City in 2014 but was released in September, a casualty of the club's transition to Major League Soccer.

In February 2015, Burke signed with expansion side Louisville City FC of United Soccer League. At season's end, he was named the USL Defender of the Year.

Burke signed with North American Soccer League club Jacksonville Armada FC in December 2015.

In 2018, Burke featured for the Oakland Leopards, an amateur affiliate of Oakland Roots SC.

== Honors ==
=== Individual ===
- USL Assists Champion: 2015
- USL All League First Team: 2015
- USL Defender of the Year: 2015
