= Tyler Gibson =

American soccer player (born 1991)

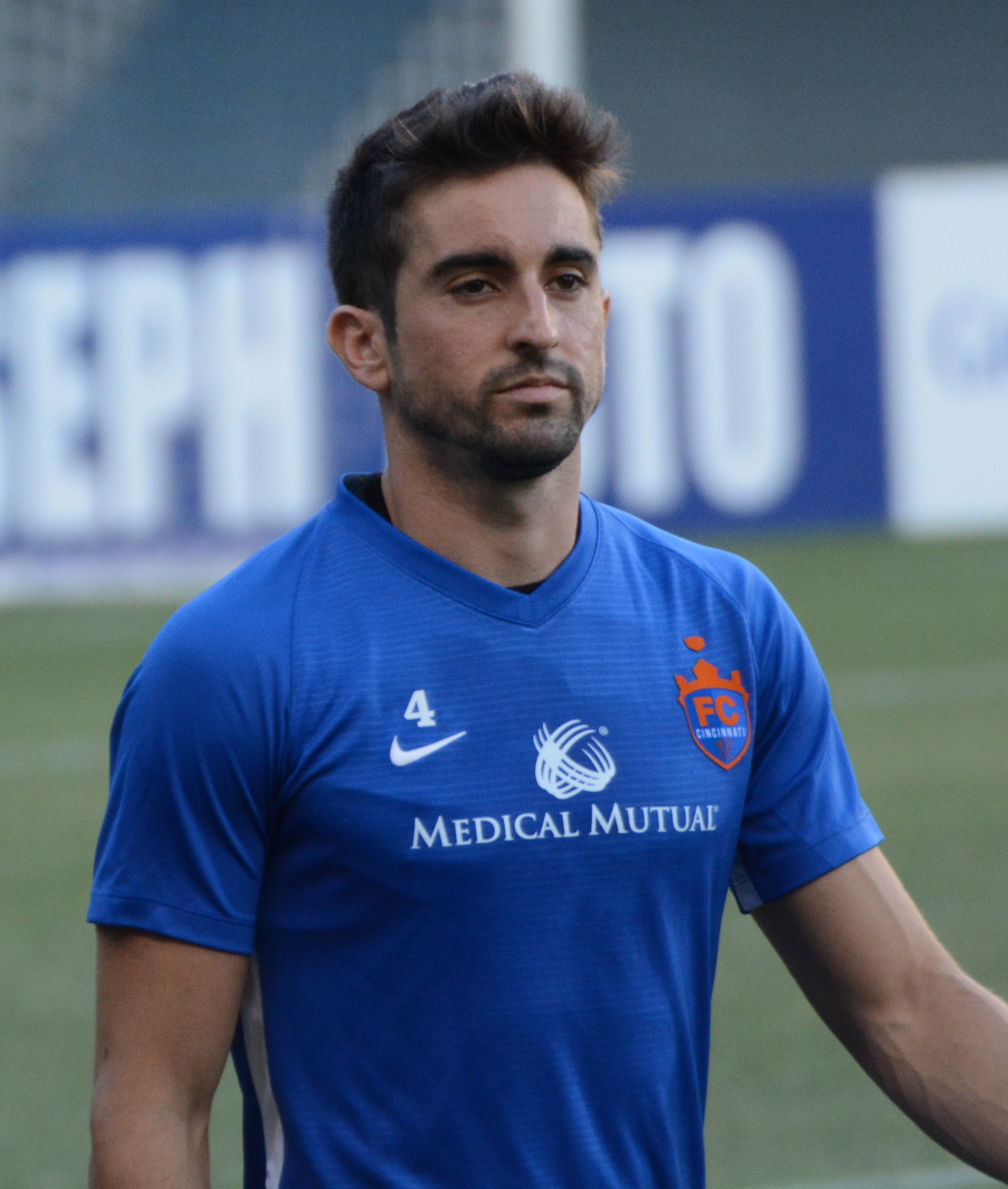
- Gibson with FC Cincinnati in 2018

Personal information
- Date of birth: January 12, 1991 (age 35)
- Place of birth: Knoxville, Tennessee, United States
- Height: 1.73 m (5 ft 8 in)
- Position: Midfielder

Team information
- Current team: Oakland Roots
- Number: 12

College career
Years	Team	Apps	(Gls)
2009–2013	Charlotte 49ers	86	(13)

Senior career*
Years	Team	Apps	(Gls)
2015	San Antonio Scorpions	22	(0)
2016	Rayo OKC	16	(1)
2017	San Francisco Deltas	30	(0)
2018	FC Cincinnati	7	(0)
2019–2020	Indy Eleven	50	(1)
2021–2023	Louisville City	87	(0)
2024	Indy Eleven	21	(1)
2025–	Oakland Roots	50	(0)
- * Club domestic league appearances and goals as of October 31, 2026

Tyler Gibson (born January 12, 1991) is an American professional soccer player who plays as a midfielder for USL Championship club Oakland Roots.

== Career ==
=== College career ===
A four-year starter at Charlotte, Gibson was named Atlantic 10 Conference (A-10) midfielder and Freshman of the Year for the 2009 season. He was a four-time A-10 First Team selection. He was twice named to the Hermann Award watch list and helped the 49ers win a Conference USA championship his senior year.

=== Professional career ===
Originally invited to the 2014 Major League Soccer Combine, Gibson was projected as a second round pick due to his vision and work ethic. He was signed as a rookie to the Scorpions leading into the 2015 NASL season. He quickly received playing time during the 2015 NASL Spring Season and ended the year starting 22 matches.

The Scorpions suspended operations following the 2015 NASL season and Gibson signed with expansion side Rayo OKC on January 26, 2016.

On November 21, 2017, Gibson joined FC Cincinnati of the United Soccer League.

After two seasons in the USL Championship with Indy Eleven, Gibson made the move to Louisville City on December 14, 2020, ahead of the upcoming 2021 season.

On January 29, 2024, Indy Eleven announced Gibson's return to his former club ahead of the 2024 USL Championship season.

Gibson captained Indy Eleven on his second debut for the club, a 2–1 defeat at Oakland Roots SC on March 9, 2024. He scored his first goal in his second time with the Indianapolis-based club on July 5, in a 3–3 away draw against Rhode Island FC in the USL Championship.

Gibson joined Oakland Roots SC in December 2024. He made his league debut on March 8 in a 2–4 away defeat to Orange County SC.

== Honors ==
=== Club ===
San Francisco Deltas

- Soccer Bowl: 2017

FC Cincinnati

- USL Regular Season Championship: 2018
