= Tom Heinemann =

American soccer player (born 1987)

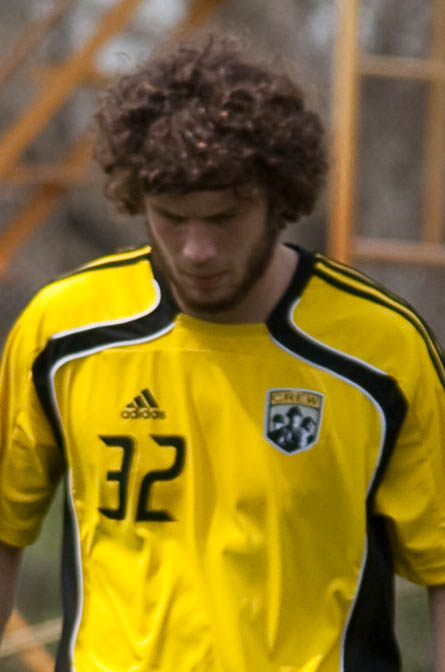

Personal information
- Date of birth: April 23, 1987 (age 39)
- Place of birth: St. Louis, Missouri, U.S.
- Height: 6 ft 4 in (1.93 m)
- Position: Forward

College career
Years	Team	Apps	(Gls)
2006–2008	Rockhurst Hawks	60	(36)

Senior career*
Years	Team	Apps	(Gls)
2006–2008	St. Louis Lions	36	(35)
2009–2010	Charleston Battery	39	(9)
2009	→ Harrisburg City Islanders (loan)	1	(0)
2010	Carolina RailHawks	12	(6)
2011–2012	Columbus Crew	31	(3)
2013	Vancouver Whitecaps FC	14	(1)
2014–2015	Ottawa Fury	45	(14)
2016	Tampa Bay Rowdies	26	(4)
2017	San Francisco Deltas	29	(9)
2018	FC Cincinnati	0	(0)
2018	Penn FC	12	(3)
Total		245	(84)

Managerial career
- 2019–2021: Belmont Bruins (assistant)
- 2022–2024: United States U15
- 2025–: Chicago Fire (assistant)
- * Club domestic league appearances and goals as of January 8, 2025

Tom Heinemann (born April 23, 1987) is an American former professional soccer player who is currently an assistant coach for Major League Soccer club Chicago Fire.

== Career ==
=== Youth and college ===
Heinemann attended Christian Brothers College High School, and played college soccer at Rockhurst University from 2006 to 2008, where he was named to the NSCAA/adidas NCAA Division II Men's All-America Team as a sophomore and as a junior. During his time at Rockhurst, Heinemann accumulated 36 goals and 21 assists while appearing in 60 games. He also played in the USL Premier Development League for St. Louis Lions, where he was a prolific goalscorer, netting 35 times in 36 games over three seasons with the team.

=== Professional ===
Heinemann was signed to his first professional contract by the Charleston Battery after impressing head coach Michael Anhaeuser during a pre-season trial. He made his professional debut on April 11, 2009, in Charleston's USL1 season opener against the Vancouver Whitecaps and scored his first professional goal on June 7, 2009, in a 1–1 tie with the Austin Aztex.

Heinemann continued with Charleston in 2010, helping them to the 2010 USL Second Division title. Following the conclusion of the 2010 USL2 season, Heinemann signed with the Carolina RailHawks for the remainder of the USSF Division 2 Professional League regular season and playoffs. Heinemann scored the game-winning goal in the RailHawks semifinal victory over the Montreal Impact. During that season, the Railhawks made a run to the title match, but lost to the Puerto Rico Islanders. He was named MVP of the championship game.

On January 6, 2011, Heinemann signed with Columbus Crew of Major League Soccer. He played his first game with the Crew on March 19, 2011, in their 2011 MLS season opener against D.C. United. Heinemann was released by Columbus following the 2012 season and signed with Vancouver Whitecaps FC on January 23, 2013 scoring his first MLS goal for the team on September 1, 2013, in second-half stoppage time, to help his team draw 2–2 with Chivas USA. The club declined his option along with seven other players at the end of the 2013 season.

He was signed by NASL expansion side Ottawa Fury on February 2, 2014, ahead of their inaugural campaign. Ottawa advanced to the 2015 Soccer Bowl, but despite 2 goals from Heinamann they were defeated by the New York Cosmos.

Heinemann signed with Tampa Bay Rowdies on December 14, 2015.

Heinemann signed with new NASL club San Francisco Deltas on February 6, 2017. The club won the post-season playoffs for the league but folded shortly after due to financial difficulties.The finals match saw Heinemann score the winning goal on a penalty kick in the 19th minute as the Delta's claimed the 2017 Soccer Bowl.

Heinemann signed with USL club FC Cincinnati on December 5, 2017. However, he was released by the club before the 2018 season started due to a failed entry physical.

On March 29, 2018, Heinemann signed with Penn FC of the United Soccer League.

=== Coaching ===
Heinemann retired from professional soccer following the 2018 season. On April 16, 2019, he was named an assistant coach with the Belmont Bruins men's soccer team.

In February 2022, Heinemann was named head coach for the United States boys' national under-15 soccer team. Under Heinemann's stewardship the team won 6 consecutive matches, while outscoring their opponents 26–5, to claim the 2023 CONCACAF Boys' Under-15 Championship Final.

In January 2025, Heinemann joined the staff of Major League Soccer side Chicago Fire as an assistant coach.

== Coaching statistics ==
As of matches played on June 3, 2024.

Coaching record by team and tenure
Team	From	To	Record				
Team	From	To	P	W	D	L	Win %
United States U-15 BNT	2022	Present	19	13	1	5	68.4
Total			19	13	1	5	68.4

== Personal ==
Heinemann was the owner and director of the Heinemann Soccer Camp in St. Louis, Missouri.

== Honors ==
San Francisco Deltas

- NASL Championship: 2017

Charleston Battery

- USL Second Division Champions: 2010
