= Patrick Hopkins =

American soccer player

Personal information
- Full name: Patrick Hopkins
- Date of birth: 18 December 1987 (age 38)
- Place of birth: Chicago, Illinois, United States
- Height: 6 ft 3 in (1.91 m)
- Position: Center back

Youth career
- 2006–2010: DePaul University

Senior career*
Years	Team	Apps	(Gls)
2011	Brisbane Wolves	27	(17)
2012–2013	Ljungskile SK	54	(3)
2014–2016	IK Sirius	66	(3)
2017	San Francisco Deltas	22	(2)
- * Club domestic league appearances and goals as of 09:52, 30 October 2017 (UTC)

Patrick Hopkins (born December 18, 1987) is an American soccer player who last played for the San Francisco Deltas in the North American Soccer League.

== Career ==
Hopkins played college football for DePaul University from 2006 to 2010. In 2011, Hopkins played for Australia's Brisbane Wolves where he scored 17 goals as a midfielder.

In January 2012, Hopkins signed a two-year contract with Swedish side Ljungskile SK. He was appointed team captain for the 2013 season.

In November 2013, Hopkins transferred to IK Sirius where he signed a three-year contract.

In February 2017, Hopkins signed for new expansion team San Francisco Deltas.
