= Jackson (footballer, born 1988) =

Brazilian footballer

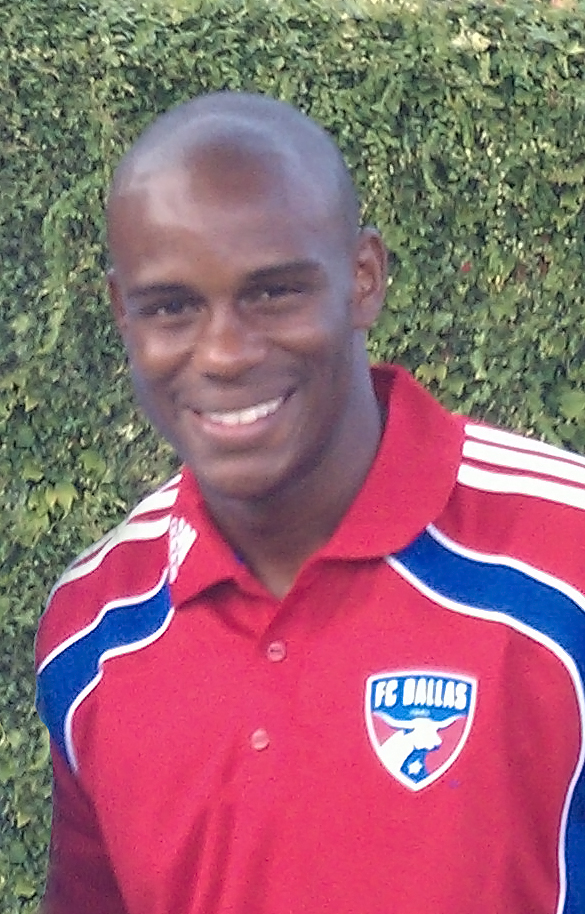
- Jackson with FC Dallas

Personal information
- Full name: Jackson Henrique Gonçalves Pereira
- Date of birth: June 3, 1988 (age 38)
- Place of birth: Franca, Brazil
- Height: 1.76 m (5 ft 9 in)
- Positions: Full-back; winger

Youth career
- 2002: Internacional-SP
- 2002–2004: Rio Branco-SP
- 2005–2006: São Paulo

Senior career*
Years	Team	Apps	(Gls)
2007–2011	São Paulo	1	(0)
2008	→ Uberaba (loan)	0	(0)
2009	→ Mogi Mirim (loan)	14	(0)
2009	→ São Caetano (loan)	1	(0)
2010	→ Botafogo-SP (loan)	3	(0)
2010–2011	→ FC Dallas (loan)	40	(4)
2012–2013	FC Dallas	51	(7)
2012	→ Cruzeiro (loan)	0	(0)
2014–2015	Toronto FC	52	(5)
2016	Clube Atlético Itapemirim		
2017	San Francisco Deltas	24	(1)
2019	Fresno FC	20	(3)
- * Club domestic league appearances and goals as of 25 October 2019

Jackson Henrique Gonçalves Pereira (born June 3, 1988), commonly known as Jackson, is a Brazilian former professional footballer who played as a full-back or winger.

== Career ==
Jackson made his professional debut for São Paulo against Fluminense in a 1–1 draw at the Maracanã in the Campeonato Brasileiro on October 13, 2007. He was then taken off at half-time and replaced by Fernando. He also made his Copa Sudamericana debut for São Paulo in 1–0 home defeat to Millonarios on October 10, 2007.

On August 13, 2010, FC Dallas of Major League Soccer signed Jackson on loan from São Paulo FC. He made his debut for his new club the following day, coming on in the 82nd minute for Brek Shea against D.C. United at RFK Stadium in Washington, D.C. He started in the MLS Cup 2010 loss to Colorado Rapids, playing 34 minutes. Jackson was also named to the MLS Team of Week 15 and 16 in the 2011 MLS season for his play against Portland Timbers and Columbus Crew. Jackson was loaned for one year by FC Dallas to Cruzeiro on January 18, 2012. On April 13, 2012, FC Dallas recalled Jackson from Cruzeiro, cutting short the loan deal due to injuries in the FC Dallas midfield.

On December 9, 2013, Jackson was traded to Toronto FC in exchange for allocation money and a conditional second-round draft pick in the 2015 MLS SuperDraft. Toronto declined Jackson's option at the end of the 2015 season. He was not selected in the 2015 MLS Re-Entry Draft and was released from his MLS contract at the end of the year.

Jackson returned to Brazil and signed with Clube Atlético Itapemirim on March 22, 2016.

On December 16, 2016, it was announced that Jackson had signed with NASL expansion side San Francisco Deltas. He left the club a year later, when his contract expired in December 2017.

Jackson signed with Fresno FC on February 12, 2019.
