= Pablo Vranjicán =

Argentine footballer

Personal information
- Full name: Pablo Andrés Vranjicán Storani
- Date of birth: 11 December 1985 (age 40)
- Place of birth: Acebal, Argentina
- Height: 1.84 m (6 ft 0 in)
- Position: Forward

Youth career
- 2004–2006: Newell's Old Boys

Senior career*
Years	Team	Apps	(Gls)
2006–2011	Newell's Old Boys	5	(0)
2009–2010	→ Rangers (loan)	23	(9)
2010	→ Universidad Católica (loan)	16	(2)
2011	Guaraní	1	(0)
2012	Unión San Felipe	14	(1)
2012	Unión San Felipe B	2	(3)
2012	Santiago Morning	14	(3)
2013	Unidos Atlético Club	–	(–)
2013–2014	AEK Kouklia	23	(6)
2014–2015	Deportes La Serena	26	(8)
2015–2016	Curicó Unido	27	(15)
2016	Pahang FA	9	(4)
2017	New York Cosmos	19	(5)
2018	Alianza Petrolera	26	(5)
2019	Deportes La Serena	24	(4)
2020	Gravina	3	(1)
2020–2021	Fernández Vial	11	(2)
2021	San Antonio Unido	6	(1)
2022	Fernández Vial	23	(3)
- * Club domestic league appearances and goals as of 19 May 2024

Pablo Andrés Vranjicán Storani (born 11 December 1985) is an Argentine footballer who plays as a forward. His last club was Fernández Vial.

Vranjicán also holds a Croatian passport due to his Croatian ancestry.

== Club career ==
Vranjicán is a product of Newell's Old Boys, with whom he made his professional debut.

On 29 June 2013, he signed a contract with Cypriot side AEK Kouklia. He previously played for Unidos Atlético Club from Zavalla in the Liga Casildense.

He made his first appearance with Pahang FC on 12 July 2016 against Kelantan as substitute and scored 2 goals in the match against Sarawak.

== Honours ==
Universidad Católica

- Primera División de Chile (1): 2010
