= San Francisco Deltas =

American professional soccer team

- Nickname: The Deltas
- Founded: October 16, 2015; 11 years ago
- Dissolved: November 24, 2017; 8 years ago
- Stadium: Kezar Stadium; San Francisco, California
- Capacity: 10,000
- League: North American Soccer League
- 2017: Spring: 2nd Fall: 2nd Combined: 2nd Playoffs: NASL Champions
- Website: www.sfdeltas.com
Home colors	Away colors

The San Francisco Deltas were an American professional soccer team based in San Francisco, California, United States. Founded in 2016, the team made its debut in the North American Soccer League in 2017. The franchise played its home games at Kezar Stadium located at the south-east end of Golden Gate Park.

In its only year of play, they won the 2017 NASL championship and then folded 12 days later.

== History ==
The San Francisco Deltas soccer team were led by CEO Colombian-born entrepreneur, Brian Andrés Helmick. On October 14, 2015, the Deltas got the final signatures for admission to the North American Soccer League (NASL) in order to bring pro soccer to San Francisco.

The Deltas were financially backed by a group of investors from Silicon Valley tech companies and venture capital firms as well as investors from Brazil. The group included Jonathan Peachey, former CEO of Virgin in North America; Danny Khatib, Co-Founder, President and COO of Livingly Media; and Josh McFarland, senior director of product at Twitter.

Helmick wanted to run the club like a tech startup, leading to some of "the most convoluted and confounding series of choices in American soccer", including hiring a Director of Marketing who admitted she had "no business being the Director of Marketing of anything really, let alone for a professional soccer team in one of the world’s greatest cities".

The Deltas promised to bring tech-inspired innovations to the sport, including a virtual reality fan experience and artificial intelligence ticketing system, none of which were ever fully realized.

The first three players were announced on December 12, 2016 with more announced over the next two months. Prior to the team's debut, it received notice for its large Canadian contingent, including coach Marc Dos Santos and captain Nana Attakora. The team was dubbed "Canada's Unofficial Team".

The Deltas earned their first competitive victory on Saturday, April 8, 2017, beating North Carolina FC 3–1 at home. Including their first preseason, The Deltas did not lose a match in nine games, drawing six and winning three, including a 1–0 victory over the San Jose Earthquakes in a preseason friendly. Their first loss was on April 29, 2017 against the New York Cosmos where they lost 1–0. The Deltas earned their first US Open Cup victory on Wednesday, May 17, 2017, beating Burlingame Dragons 2–1.

Despite that on-field success, the team struggled to draw fans or attention in San Francisco. In July, Helmick wrote a blog post lamenting poor attendance at the games. He warned that the Deltas might not return for a second season if that situation didn't improve, challenging the fans with "only you can fix this". He asked each supporter to bring one friend to the next game, who would then each bring one to the following game, a "proposal that superficially looked like a pyramid scheme."

The Deltas continued to succeed on the field and struggle off it all season. After the team earned a spot in the NASL championship final, the San Francisco Chronicle reported that the Deltas could fold even if they won the championship, citing poor attendance and over $8 million in losses.

On November 12, 2017, the Deltas beat the New York Cosmos 2–0 to win the NASL championship. Twelve days later, on November 24, 2017, the Deltas announced that it had ceased operations effective immediately, releasing all players and staff from their contracts.

=== Record ===
Season	NASL									Overall	NASL Playoffs	U.S. Open Cup	Top goalscorer		Managers	Avg. attendance
Season	Div.	Pos.	Pl.	W	D	L	GS	GA	P	Overall	NASL Playoffs	U.S. Open Cup	Name	League	Managers	Avg. attendance
2017	Spring	2nd	16	7	5	4	17	20	26	2nd	NASL Champions	Fourth round	(United States) Tommy Heinemann	9	(Canada) Marc Dos Santos	2,575 (8th)
2017	Fall	2nd	16	7	7	2	24	15	28	2nd	NASL Champions	Fourth round	(United States) Tommy Heinemann	9	(Canada) Marc Dos Santos	2,575 (8th)

== Crest ==
The name and crest were unveiled on January 30, 2016. San Francisco Deltas CEO Brian Helmick wrote "DELTA means CHANGE. In the city of change and innovation, our goal is to take risks and grow the world's sport for fans in the entire Bay Area." during a Reddit Ask Me Anything (AMA) session in February 2017. When coming up with name and crest, the operations team listened to a lot of fan input before making a decision. The name came about through eight major points: 1) No animals, there are too many animal team names; 2) Don't copy European Club Soccer in terms of naming, be original; 3) Europe is known for crests and nobility, but the USA is not; 4) With 40% of the people living in San Francisco not being born in the USA, they want to make sure the name can be pronounced in most languages (e.g. "th" doesn't exist in Spanish, Portuguese, Italian, French, etc.); 5) Less is more, don't make it complicated; 6) Take risks and be different, SF is all about taking risks and being different; 7) Don't manufacture history, own the fact that you're a new team, pick a name and let your actions develop your brand and not your colors, font type, design, etc; 8) Don't over-explain things, let fans create their own relationship with the club for their own reasons. The fourth letter in the Greek alphabet is Delta and the symbol is a triangle and has connections with both soccer (Cruyff and possession football) and SF (Twin Peaks, Transamerica Pyramid, the towers and cables of the bridges form triangles, etc.).

When the logo was released online, it was unfavorably compared to fictional corporate logos, criticized for having no connection to San Francisco, and called "the worst name and logo in American professional sports".

== Stadium ==
In early 2016, it was announced that San Francisco Deltas would play their home games at Kezar Stadium. In December 2016, more than 3,800 Candlestick Park seats from the former home of the San Francisco 49ers were acquired by the San Francisco Deltas and installed at Kezar Stadium. This was part of $1 million in improvements The Deltas agreed to make to use Kezar Stadium, including new flood lights and updated locker rooms for the players.

== Jerseys ==
Predominantly red and black, the inaugural season home jersey was unveiled on August 31, 2016 after fan voting by season ticket holders. The away jerseys were announced on March 10, 2017 and were predominantly white. The jerseys were manufactured by Inaria.

== Individual records ==
=== Top goalscorers ===
	Name	Years	NASL	Playoffs	US Open Cup	Total
1	(United States) Tom Heinemann	2017	9 (29)	1 (2)	2 (3)	12 (34)
2	(Brazil) Pablo Dyego	2017	6 (27)	0 (2)	0 (1)	6 (30)
3	(United States) Devon Sandoval	2017	4 (28)	1 (2)	0 (2)	5 (32)
4	(Canada) Kyle Bekker	2017	3 (28)	0 (2)	1 (3)	4 (33)
5	(Brazil) Reiner	2017	2 (31)	0 (2)	1 (3)	3 (36)
5	(United States) Bryan Burke	2017	3 (13)	0 (0)	0 (1)	3 (14)
5	(Brazil) Dagoberto	2017	3 (13)	0 (0)	0 (0)	3 (13)
8	(Spain) Cristian Portilla	2017	2 (17)	0 (0)	0 (2)	2 (19)
8	(United States) Patrick Hopkins	2017	2 (21)	0 (1)	0 (2)	2 (24)
8	(Netherlands) Kenny Teijsse	2017	2 (23)	0 (0)	0 (2)	2 (25)

=== Most appearances ===
	Name	Years	League	Playoffs	US Open Cup	Total
1	(Brazil) Reiner	2017	31 (2)	2 (0)	3 (1)	36 (3)
2	(United States) Tyler Gibson	2017	30 (0)	2 (1)	3 (0)	35 (1)
3	(United States) Tom Heinemann	2017	29 (9)	2 (1)	3 (1)	34 (12)
4	(Canada) Kyle Bekker	2017	28 (3)	2 (0)	3 (1)	33 (4)
4	(France) Romuald Peiser	2017	31 (0)	2 (0)	0 (0)	33 (0)
6	(United States) Devon Sandoval	2017	28 (4)	2 (1)	2 (0)	32 (5)
7	(United States) Michael Stephens	2017	26 (0)	2 (0)	3 (0)	31 (0)
8	(Brazil) Pablo Dyego	2017	27 (6)	2 (0)	1 (0)	30 (6)
9	(Brazil) Jackson	2017	22 (1)	2 (0)	2 (0)	26 (1)
9	(Canada) Karl Ouimette	2017	23 (0)	2 (0)	1 (0)	26 (0)

=== Managerial records ===
Name	Nat.	From	To	P	W	D	L	GS	GA	%W	Honors
Marc Dos Santos	Canada	August 17, 2016	November 15, 2017	37	18	12	7	48	39	48.65	Soccer Bowl

- Notes:

P – Total of played matches W – Won matches D – Drawn matches L – Lost matches GS – Goal scored GA – Goals against
%W – Percentage of matches won

Nationality is indicated by the corresponding FIFA country code(s).
