= 2015 Carolina RailHawks FC season =

Carolina RailHawks
2015 season
- Owner: Traffic Sports USA
- Head coach: Colin Clarke
- Stadium: WakeMed Soccer Park
- NASL: Spring: 3rd Fall: TBD Combined: TBD
- Soccer Bowl: TBD
- U.S. Open Cup: Third Round vs Charlotte Independence
- Top goalscorer: League: Nacho Novo (5); All: Nacho Novo (5)
- Highest home attendance: 7,217 (May 16 vs. New York)
- Lowest home attendance: League: 3,055 (July 8 vs. Fort Lauderdale); All: 832 (May 27 vs. Charlotte)
- Average home league attendance: League: 4,464; All: 4,010
Home colors	Away colors

The 2015 Carolina RailHawks season was the club's ninth season of existence, and their fifth consecutive season in North American Soccer League, the second division of the American soccer pyramid.

The season followed the Spring / Fall format adopted by the NASL in 2013 with the Spring season starting on April 4 and lasting for 10 games until June 13, while the Fall season began on July 4 and ended on October 30. There was a four-team postseason format, including the champions of the Spring and Fall seasons, with the 2 other teams with the best records joining them.

== Club ==
=== Roster ===
Note: Flags indicate national team as defined under FIFA eligibility rules; some limited exceptions apply. Players may hold more than one non-FIFA nationality. Squad correct as of October 15, 2015.

No.	Pos.	Nation	Player
1	GK	USA	Hunter Gilstrap
2	DF	USA	Daniel Scott
3	DF	PUR	Kupono Low (Captain)
4	MF	USA	Neil Hlavaty
5	MF	USA	Nazmi Albadawi
6	MF	USA	Austin da Luz
7	FW	ITA	Simone Bracalello
8	DF	ESP	Alex Pérez
9	FW	USA	Wells Thompson
10	FW	ESP	Nacho Novo
11	MF	RSA	Ty Shipalane
12	GK	USA	Akira Fitzgerald
13	DF	USA	Connor Tobin
14	MF	JPN	Leo Osaki
15	DF	USA	Austen King
16	FW	BIH	Dzenan Catic
17	MF	GUY	Chris Nurse
18	MF	USA	Jack Coleman
19	DF	USA	Blake Wagner
20	MF	ENG	Mark Anderson
21	FW	USA	Tyler Engel
22	MF	USA	Jamie Dell
24	FW	USA	Bradlee Baladez
28	FW	USA	Daniel Jackson
31	DF	USA	Steven Miller
36	MF	BRA	Gabriel
39	FW	USA	Mamadee Nyepon
98	DF	GAM	Futty Danso

==== Out on loan ====
Note: Flags indicate national team as defined under FIFA eligibility rules; some limited exceptions apply. Players may hold more than one non-FIFA nationality. Squad correct as of October 15, 2015.

No.	Pos.	Nation	Player
92	GK	USA	Brian Sylvestre (at Philadelphia Union)

=== Transfers ===
==== Winter ====
Note: Flags indicate national team as has been defined under FIFA eligibility rules. Players may hold more than one non-FIFA nationality.

In: Note: Flags indicate national team as defined under FIFA eligibility rules; some limited exceptions apply. Players may hold more than one non-FIFA nationality.

No.	Pos.	Nation	Player
1	GK	USA	Hunter Gilstrap (from (United States) Pittsburgh Riverhounds)
4	MF	USA	Neil Hlavaty (from (Canada) Edmonton)
7	FW	ITA	Simone Bracalello (from (United States) Minnesota United)
9	FW	USA	Wells Thompson (from (United States) Charlotte Eagles)
12	GK	USA	Akira Fitzgerald (loan from (United States) New York City)
16	FW	BIH	Dzenan Catic (loan from (United States) Philadelphia Union)
17	MF	GUY	Chris Nurse (from (United States) Fort Lauderdale Strikers)
18	MF	USA	Jack Coleman (from (United States) Duke Blue Devils)
19	DF	USA	Blake Wagner (from (United States) Tampa Bay Rowdies)
20	MF	ENG	Mark Anderson (from (United States) Fort Lauderdale Strikers)
21	FW	USA	Tyler Engel (from (United States) Chicago Fire U23)
24	FW	USA	Bradlee Baladez (from (United States) Arizona United)
42	GK	USA	Brian Sylvestre (from (United States) Harrisburg City Islanders)
98	DF	GAM	Futty Danso (from (Canada) Montreal Impact)

Out: Note: Flags indicate national team as defined under FIFA eligibility rules; some limited exceptions apply. Players may hold more than one non-FIFA nationality.

No.	Pos.	Nation	Player
6	MF	USA	Gabe Latigue
9	FW	USA	Zack Schilawski
10	MF	URU	Enzo Martínez (to (United States) Charlotte Independence)
12	GK	USA	Scott Goodwin (to (United States) Louisville City)
13	DF	TTO	Uriah Bentick (to (Trinidad and Tobago) Central)
14	DF	USA	Jordan Graye (to (United States) Fort Lauderdale Strikers)
18	FW	USA	Aaron King (to (United States) Colorado Springs Switchbacks)
23	MF	USA	Nick Zimmerman (to (United States) Wilmington Hammerheads)
25	MF	USA	Jordan Burt (to (United States) Colorado Springs Switchbacks)
27	MF	JPN	Jun Marques Davidson (to (Thailand) Siam Navy)
90	MF	USA	Danny Barrera (to (United States) Sacramento Republic)

==== Summer ====
Note: Flags indicate national team as has been defined under FIFA eligibility rules. Players may hold more than one non-FIFA nationality.

In: Note: Flags indicate national team as defined under FIFA eligibility rules; some limited exceptions apply. Players may hold more than one non-FIFA nationality.

No.	Pos.	Nation	Player
8	DF	ESP	Álex Pérez (from (Spain) Getafe)
12	GK	USA	Akira Fitzgerald (from (United States) New York City, previously on loan)
31	DF	USA	Steven Miller (loan from (United States) Tulsa Roughnecks)
36	MF	BRA	Gabriel (from (Croatia) Bistra)

Out: Note: Flags indicate national team as defined under FIFA eligibility rules; some limited exceptions apply. Players may hold more than one non-FIFA nationality.

No.	Pos.	Nation	Player
8	DF	USA	Wes Knight (Retired)
42	GK	USA	Brian Sylvestre (loan to (United States) Philadelphia Union)

== Competitions ==
=== Pre-season and Exhibitions ===
==== Pre-season ====
March 8, 2015 Preseason	Carolina RailHawks (United States)	0–0 (5–4 p)	(South Korea) Seoul E-Land FC	Cary, North Carolina
3:00 p.m. EST		Report		Stadium: WakeMed Soccer Park
	Penalties
	Coleman (penalty scored); Latigue (penalty scored) (penalty scored); Bracalello (penalty scored); Thompson (penalty scored)		(penalty scored) Johnson; (penalty scored) Kim Jae-sung (penalty scored) (penalty missed) (penalty scored)

March 14, 2015 Preseason	Charleston Battery	3–2	Carolina RailHawks	Charleston, South Carolina
2:00 p.m. EST	Boyd 15'; Portillo 26'; Cordovés (yellow card) 34'; Garbanzo 50'; Herderson (yellow card) 68'	Report	King (yellow card) 32'; Thompson 47'; Tobin (yellow card) 62'; Ballo 73' (o.g.)	Stadium: Blackbaud Stadium

March 17, 2015 Preseason	Carolina RailHawks	3–0	UNC Wilmington Seahawks	Cary, North Carolina
5:00 p.m. EST	Academy Player #21 36'; Albadawi 48'; Bracalello 72'	Report		Stadium: WakeMed Soccer Park Field #7
Note: Three 30-minute periods.

March 21, 2015 Preseason	Carolina RailHawks	0–1	Charlotte Independence	Cary, North Carolina
3:00 p.m. EST	Bracalello (yellow card) 19'; Scott (yellow card) 29'; Albadawi (yellow card) 66'	Report	Eloundou 35'	Stadium: WakeMed Soccer Park Field #5

March 28, 2015 Preseason	Carolina RailHawks	0–0	FC Edmonton	Jacksonville, Florida
3:00 p.m. EST	Osaki (yellow card) 54'	Report		Stadium: EverBank Field

=== NASL Spring Season ===
The Spring season will last for 10 games beginning on April 4 and ending on June 6. The schedule will feature a single round robin format with each team playing every other team in the league a single time.

==== Standings ====
Pos	Team	Pld	W	D	L	GF	GA	GD	Pts	Qualification
1	New York Cosmos (S)	10	5	5	0	18	9	+9	20	Playoffs
2	Tampa Bay Rowdies	10	5	4	1	15	9	+6	19	
3	Carolina RailHawks	10	3	5	2	15	10	+5	14	
4	Minnesota United	10	3	5	2	15	13	+2	14	
5	Indy Eleven	10	3	4	3	13	12	+1	13	
6	Jacksonville Armada	10	3	3	4	15	18	−3	12	
7	San Antonio Scorpions	10	3	3	4	11	15	−4	12	
8	Fort Lauderdale Strikers	10	3	2	5	12	13	−1	11	
9	Ottawa Fury	10	2	5	3	5	8	−3	11	
10	FC Edmonton	10	2	3	5	16	22	−6	9	
11	Atlanta Silverbacks	10	1	5	4	7	13	−6	8	

Source: NASL
Rules for classification: 1) points; 2) total goal differential; 3) total goals scored; 4) head-to-head record; 5) away goal differential; 6) away goals scored
(S) Spring season champion

==== Results ====
Overall								Home						Away					
Pld	W	D	L	GF	GA	GD	Pts	W	D	L	GF	GA	GD	W	D	L	GF	GA	GD
10	3	5	2	15	10	+5	14	1	3	1	8	7	+1	2	2	1	7	3	+4

Last updated: May 26, 2015.
Source: http://www.nasl.com/standings

===== Results by round =====
Round	1	2	3	4	5	6	7	8	9	10
Stadium	H	A	H	A	H	A	H	A	A	H
Result	W	D	L	D	D	L	D	W	W	D
Position	2	1	4	6	6	6	6	5	2	3

Updated to match(es) played on May 26, 2015. Source: nasl.com
A = Away; H = Home; W = Win; D = Draw; L = Loss

==== Match reports ====
April 4, 2015 Match 1	Carolina RailHawks	3–1	Ottawa Fury	Cary, North Carolina
13:00 EDT	Shipalane 11'; Novo 29' (pen.); Albadawi (yellow card) 34'; Wagner (yellow card) 45'; Bracalello 90+1'; Osaki (yellow card) 90+6'	Report	Alves (yellow card) 15'; Beckie (yellow card) 16'; Richter (yellow card) 34'; Poltronieri 84' de Guzman (yellow card) 90+1' (red card) 90+3'; Peiser (yellow card) 90+6'	Stadium: WakeMed Soccer Park; Attendance: 5,190; Referee: Robert Sibiga

April 12, 2015 Match 2	Edmonton	1–1	Carolina RailHawks	Edmonton, Alberta
16:00 EDT	Laing 45'; Moses (yellow card) 60'	Report	Novo 41'; Wagner (yellow card) 65'; Nurse (yellow card) 79'; Albadawi (yellow card) 85'	Stadium: Clarke Stadium; Attendance: 2,492; Referee: Juan Marquez

April 18, 2015 Match 3	Carolina RailHawks	1–2	Atlanta Silverbacks	Cary, North Carolina
19:30 EDT	Anderson (yellow card) 68'; Wagner 82'; Nurse (yellow card) 84'	Report	Bangura 40'; Okafor 62'	Stadium: WakeMed Soccer Park; Attendance: 4,489; Referee: Mark Kadlecik

April 25, 2015 Match 4	Indy Eleven	1–1	Carolina RailHawks	Indianapolis, Indiana
19:30 EDT	Scott 7' (o.g.)	Report	Wagner 84'	Stadium: Carroll Stadium; Attendance: 10,524; Referee: Alex Chilowicz

May 2, 2015 Match 5	Carolina RailHawks	1–1	Tampa Bay Rowdies	Cary, North Carolina
19:30 EDT	Novo 6'	Report	Nuñez 19'; Sweat (yellow card) 25'; Hristov (red card) 76'; Mkandawire (yellow card) 90+4'	Stadium: WakeMed Soccer Park; Attendance: 4,042; Referee: Chris Penso

May 9, 2015 Match 6	San Antonio Scorpions	1–0	Carolina RailHawks	San Antonio, Texas
20:30 EDT	DeRoux (yellow card) 70'; Dike 79'	Report	Low (yellow card) 7'; Scott (yellow card) 60'	Stadium: Toyota Field; Attendance: 7,252; Referee: Dave Gantar

May 16, 2015 Match 7	Carolina RailHawks	2–2	New York Cosmos	Cary, North Carolina
19:30 EDT	Hlavaty 7'; Low (yellow card) 45'; Gilstrap (yellow card) 74'; Shipalane 76'; Wagner (yellow card) 79'; Nurse (yellow card) 90'	Report	Szetela (yellow card) 30'; Raúl (yellow card) 32'; Ayoze (yellow card) 52'; Mkosana (yellow card) 67'; Danso 90+1' (o.g.); Flores 90+7'	Stadium: WakeMed Soccer Park; Attendance: 7,217; Referee: Nima Saghafi

May 23, 2015 Match 8	Fort Lauderdale Strikers	0–1	Carolina RailHawks	Fort Lauderdale, Florida
19:30 EDT	PC (yellow card) 59'; Adeleye (yellow card) 67'	Report	Shipalane 44'; Anderson (yellow card) 54'; Fitzgerald (yellow card) 62'; Novo (yellow card) 70'	Stadium: Lockhart Stadium; Attendance: 4,801; Referee: Marcos de Oliveira

May 30, 2015 Match 9	Jacksonville Armada	0–4	Carolina RailHawks	Jacksonville, Florida
19:30 EDT	Scaglia (yellow card) 32'; Ortiz (yellow card) 40'	Summary	Tobin 9'; Hlavaty 36'; Osaki 41'; Anderson 44' (pen.); Novo (yellow card) 82'	Stadium: Community First Park at the Baseball Grounds of Jacksonville; Attendance: 8,573; Referee: Alex Chilowicz

June 6, 2015 Match 10	Carolina RailHawks	1–1	Minnesota United	Cary, North Carolina
19:30 EDT	Novo 80' (red card) 87'	Summary	Banks 48'	Stadium: WakeMed Soccer Park; Attendance: 4,863; Referee: Mark Kadlecik

=== NASL Fall Season ===
The Fall season will last for 10 games beginning on July 4 and ending on October 30. The schedule will feature a double round robin format with each team playing every other team in the league twice, one at home and one on the road. The winner of the Fall season will qualify for the Soccer Bowl playoffs.

==== Standings ====
Pos	Team	Pld	W	D	L	GF	GA	GD	Pts	Qualification
1	Ottawa Fury (F)	20	13	6	1	37	15	+22	45	Playoffs
2	Minnesota United	20	11	6	3	39	26	+13	39	
3	New York Cosmos	20	10	6	4	31	21	+10	36	
4	Fort Lauderdale Strikers	20	8	6	6	37	27	+10	30	
5	FC Edmonton	20	7	5	8	25	24	+1	26	
6	Atlanta Silverbacks	20	6	7	7	24	27	−3	25	
7	Carolina RailHawks	20	6	3	11	29	39	−10	21	
8	Tampa Bay Rowdies	20	5	5	10	18	28	−10	20	
9	Indy Eleven	20	5	5	10	23	36	−13	20	
10	San Antonio Scorpions	20	4	7	9	30	37	−7	19	
11	Jacksonville Armada	20	5	4	11	18	31	−13	19	

Source: NASL
Rules for classification: 1) points; 2) total goal differential; 3) total goals scored; 4) head-to-head record; 5) away goal differential; 6) away goals scored
(F) Fall season champion

==== Results ====
Overall								Home						Away					
Pld	W	D	L	GF	GA	GD	Pts	W	D	L	GF	GA	GD	W	D	L	GF	GA	GD
20	6	3	11	29	39	−10	21	6	2	2	20	13	+7	0	1	9	9	26	−17

Last updated: 30 October 2015.

===== Results by round =====
Round	1	2	3	4	5	6	7	8	9	10	11	12	13	14	15	16	17	18	19	20
Stadium	H	H	A	H	A	H	A	A	H	A	H	A	A	A	H	H	H	A	A	H
Result	W	D	L	W	L	D	L	L	L	L	W	D	L	L	L	W	W	L	L	W
Position	2	1	4	3	4	5	6	8	10	10	8	7	8	9	10	9	7	8	11	7

Updated to match(es) played on 30 October 2015. Source: Spring season 2015 results
A = Away; H = Home; W = Win; D = Draw; L = Loss

==== Match reports ====
July 4, 2015 Match 1	Carolina RailHawks	3–1	Minnesota United	Cary, North Carolina
17:00 EDT	Bracalello 15'; Shipalane 17'; Low (yellow card) 28'; Thompson (yellow card) 42' (yellow-red card) 60' da Luz 57'	Report	Mendes 18'; Venegas (yellow card) 27'; Vicentini (yellow card) 57'; Cristiano (yellow card) 89'	Stadium: WakeMed Soccer Park; Attendance: 3,075; Referee: Robert Sibiga

July 8, 2015 Match 2	Carolina RailHawks	1–1	Fort Lauderdale Strikers	Cary, North Carolina
19:30 EDT	Hlavaty 53'	CAR Report; NASL Report	Stefano 77'	Stadium: WakeMed Soccer Park; Attendance: 3,055; Referee: Younes Marrakchi

July 11, 2015 Match 3	Indy Eleven	2–1	Carolina RailHawks	Indianapolis
19:30 EDT	Wojcik (yellow card) 54', (goal) 54'; Norales 56'; Lacroix (yellow card) 67'; Keller 85'	CAR Report; NASL Report	Thompson (yellow card) 40' da Luz 42'	Stadium: Carroll Stadium; Attendance: 9,629; Referee: Tyler Ploeger

July 18, 2015 Match 4	Carolina RailHawks	3–2	San Antonio Scorpions	Cary, North Carolina
19:30 EDT	Hlavaty 22'; Novo 24', 67' (pen.); Low (yellow card) 67' da Luz (yellow card) 78'	Report	Bokar (yellow card) 6'; Elizondo (yellow card) 26', (goal) 35'; Attakora (yellow card) 63'; Castillo 75' (pen.)	Stadium: WakeMed Soccer Park; Attendance: 4,180; Referee: Jaime Herrera

July 26, 2015 Match 5	Ottawa Fury	2–1	Carolina RailHawks	Ottawa Ontario
15:00 EDT	Hassan 20'; Haworth 90'	Report	Hlavaty (yellow card) 30'; Thompson (yellow card) 56' (yellow-red card) 56'; Novo 81'	Stadium: TD Place Stadium; Attendance: 5,175; Referee: Geoff Gamble

August 1, 2015 Match 6	Carolina RailHawks	1–1	Tampa Bay Rowdies	Cary, North Carolina
19:30 EDT	Anderson 32'; Danso (yellow card) 50'; Novo (yellow card) 90'; Albadawi (yellow card) 90'	Report	Hristov 29'; Guerra (yellow card) 49'	Stadium: WakeMed Soccer Park; Attendance: 6,191; Referee: Daniel Fitzgerald

August 12, 2015 Match 7	Jacksonville Armada	3–0	Carolina RailHawks	Jacksonville, Florida
19:30 EDT	Castrillón 32' (yellow card) 76'; Barrett 33' (yellow card) 85'; Johnson 62'; Scaglia (yellow card) 79'	Summary	Low (yellow card) 28'; Scott (red card) 82'	Stadium: Community First Park; Attendance: 5,652; Referee: Robert Sibiga

August 16, 2015 Match 8	Edmonton	3–0	Carolina RailHawks	Edmonton, Alberta
16:00 EDT	Ameobi 11'; Laing 27'; Corea 36'; Moses (yellow card) 59'	Summary	Nurse (yellow card) 33'; Albadawi (yellow card) 70'; Tobin (yellow card) 77'	Stadium: Clarke Field; Attendance: 2,022; Referee: Juan Marquez

August 22, 2015 Match 9	Carolina RailHawks	1–3	New York Cosmos	Cary, North Carolina
19:30 EDT	Scott 16' (yellow card) 28'	Summary	Freeman (yellow card) 44'; Fernandes 46'; Mkosana 54'; Moffat 57'	Stadium: WakeMed Soccer Park; Attendance: 5,129; Referee: Nima Saghafi

August 30, 2015 Match 10	New York Cosmos	3–2	Carolina RailHawks	Hempstead, New York
16:00 EDT	Flores 2' (yellow card) 90'; Raúl 62' (pen.); Mkosana 85'	Summary	Hlavaty (yellow card) 19'; Albadawi 23', 42' (yellow card) 83' da Luz (yellow card) 62'; Scott (red card) 66'; Tobin (yellow card) 90'	Stadium: James M. Shuart Stadium; Attendance: 5,257; Referee: Robert Sibiga

September 4, 2015 Match 11	Carolina RailHawks	2–0	Atlanta Silverbacks	Cary, North Carolina
19:30 EDT	Nurse (yellow card) 16'; Albadawi 24'; Tobin 28'	Summary	Okafor (yellow card) 77'	Stadium: WakeMed Soccer Park; Attendance: 4,021; Referee: Mark Kadlecik

September 9, 2015 Match 12	San Antonio Scorpions	3–3	Carolina RailHawks	San Antonio
20:30 EDT	Cann (red card) 19'; Castillo (yellow card) 19' (goal) 56' (pen.); Chávez 28', 65'; Rusin (yellow card) 37'; Elizondo (yellow card) 41'; Attakora (yellow card) 43'; Palacios (yellow card) 84'; DeRoux (yellow card) 90'	Summary	Novo 21' (yellow card) 90'; Shipalane 25'; Tobin (yellow card) 40' (yellow-red card) 55'; Albadawi (yellow card) 43'; Wagner (yellow card) 54'; Attakora 77' (o.g.); Gabriel (yellow card) 90'	Stadium: Toyota Field; Attendance: 4,105; Referee: Daniel Radford

September 12, 2015 Match 13	Minnesota United	3–1	Carolina RailHawks	Blaine, Minnesota
20:00 EDT	Tiago (yellow card) 23'; Mendes (yellow card) 67'; Scott (yellow card) 72'; Campos 76' (yellow card) 77'; Venegas 81'	Summary	Danso 4'; Engel (yellow card) 45' da Luz (yellow card) 71'	Stadium: National Sports Center; Attendance: 8,222; Referee: Alejandro Mariscal

September 19, 2015 Match 14	Atlanta Silverbacks	2–1	Carolina RailHawks	Atlanta
20:00 EDT	Chavez (yellow card) 25'; Ped.Ferreira-Mendes 31'; Porter 34'; Mravec (yellow card) 90'	Summary	Engel 1' (yellow card) 49'; Tobin (yellow card) 90'	Stadium: Atlanta Silverbacks Park; Attendance: 4,322; Referee: Rubiel Vazquez

September 26, 2015 Match 15	Carolina RailHawks	1–3	Ottawa Fury	Cary, North Carolina
19:30 EDT	Novo 51' (yellow card) 52' (red card) 90'; Tobin (yellow card) 83'	Summary	Heinemann 19', 33'; Paulo Jr. 45'; Peiser (yellow card) 70'	Stadium: WakeMed Soccer Park; Attendance: 3,374; Referee: Daniel Fitzgerald

October 10, 2015 Match 16	Carolina RailHawks	3–0	Jacksonville Armada	Cary, North Carolina
19:30 EDT	Shipalane 35'; Albadawi 42', 90'; Pérez (yellow card) 67'; Fitzgerald (yellow card) 88'	Summary	Johnson (yellow card) 83'; Flores (yellow card) 90'	Stadium: WakeMed Soccer Park; Attendance: 3,424; Referee: Rubiel Vazquez

October 14, 2015 Match 17	Carolina RailHawks	2–1	Edmonton	Cary, North Carolina
19:30 EDT	Albadawi 10'; Novo 83'; Miller (yellow card) 90'	Summary	Watson (yellow card) 38' (yellow-red card) 62'; Fordyce 45' (pen.); Ameobi (yellow card) 72'	Stadium: WakeMed Soccer Park; Attendance: 3,558; Referee: Marcos de Oliveira

October 17, 2015 Match 18	Fort Lauderdale Strikers	4–0	Carolina RailHawks	Fort Lauderdale, Florida
19:35 EDT	Sanfilippo 21'; Borrajo 30'; Freitas 48'; Pinho 56'	Report		Stadium: Lockhart Stadium; Attendance: 2,998; Referee: Youne Marrakchi

October 24, 2015 Match 19	Tampa Bay Rowdies	1–0	Carolina RailHawks	St. Petersburg, Florida
19:30 EDT	Menjivar 12'	Soccerway		Stadium: Al Lang Stadium; Attendance: 6,973; Referee: Jose Rivero

October 30, 2015 Match 20	Carolina RailHawks	3–1	Indy Eleven	Cary, North Carolina
19:30 EDT	Nacho Novo 9'; Shipalane 16'; Osaki (yellow card) 64'; Álex Pérez 86'	Summary	Ceballos 24'; Peña (yellow card) 33'; Mares (yellow card) 90'	Stadium: WakeMed Soccer Park; Attendance: 6,272; Referee: (United States) Matthew Kreitzer

=== U.S. Open Cup ===
The RailHawks will compete in the 2015 edition of the Open Cup.

May 27, 2015 Third round	Carolina Railhawks (North Carolina)	0–1	(North Carolina) Charlotte Independence	Cary, North Carolina
EDT	Thompson (yellow card) 34'; Dell (yellow card) 55'; Novo (yellow card) 77'	Report	Ribeiro (yellow card) 57'; Herrera (yellow card) 77'; Finley 81', (yellow card) 82'	Stadium: WakeMed Soccer Park; Attendance: 832; Referee: Matthew Franz

== Squad statistics ==
As of Match played 17 October 2015

=== Appearances and goals ===
No.	Pos	Nat	Player	Total		NASL Spring Season		NASL Fall Season		U.S. Open Cup	
No.	Pos	Nat	Player	Apps	Goals	Apps	Goals	Apps	Goals	Apps	Goals
1	GK	(United States) USA	Hunter Gilstrap	7	0	7	0	0	0	0	0
2	DF	(United States) USA	Daniel Scott	16	1	6	0	8+1	1	1	0
3	DF	(Puerto Rico) PUR	Kupono Low	22	0	6	0	14+1	0	1	0
4	MF	(United States) USA	Neil Hlavaty	29	4	10	2	18	2	1	0
5	MF	(United States) USA	Nazmi Albadawi	25	6	7	0	16+1	6	1	0
6	MF	(United States) USA	Austin da Luz	18	2	0	0	17+1	2	0	0
7	FW	(Italy) ITA	Simone Bracalello	13	2	1+2	1	4+6	1	0	0
8	DF	(Spain) ESP	Álex Pérez	3	0	0	0	3	0	0	0
9	FW	(United States) USA	Wells Thompson	15	0	4+2	0	6+2	0	1	0
10	FW	(Spain) ESP	Nacho Novo	24	10	7+1	4	12+3	6	1	0
11	MF	(South Africa) RSA	Ty Shipalane	27	6	9+1	3	16	3	1	0
12	GK	(United States) USA	Akira Fitzgerald	21	0	3	0	18	0	0	0
13	DF	(United States) USA	Connor Tobin	28	2	9+1	1	17	1	1	0
14	MF	(Japan) JPN	Leo Osaki	13	1	8+1	1	0+4	0	0	0
15	DF	(United States) USA	Austen King	6	0	0	0	5+1	0	0	0
16	FW	(Bosnia and Herzegovina) BIH	Dzenan Catic	9	0	1+3	0	1+3	0	0+1	0
17	MF	(Guyana) GUY	Chris Nurse	15	0	1+3	0	6+5	0	0	0
18	MF	(United States) USA	Jack Coleman	3	0	0+1	0	0+2	0	0	0
19	DF	(United States) USA	Blake Wagner	23	2	8+2	2	9+3	0	1	0
20	MF	(England) ENG	Mark Anderson	15	2	7+2	1	3+3	1	0	0
21	FW	(United States) USA	Tyler Engel	7	1	0	0	2+5	1	0	0
22	MF	(United States) USA	Jamie Dell	5	0	0+3	0	0+1	0	0+1	0
24	FW	(United States) USA	Bradlee Baladez	4	0	1+2	0	1	0	0	0
28	FW	(United States) USA	Daniel Jackson	3	0	0	0	3	0	0	0
31	MF	(United States) USA	Steven Miller	3	0	0	0	3	0	0	0
36	MF	(Brazil) BRA	Gabriel	4	0	0	0	0+4	0	0	0
39	FW	(United States) USA	Mamadee Nyepon	2	0	0+1	0	0+1	0	0	0
92	GK	(United States) USA	Brian Sylvestre	1	0	0	0	0	0	1	0
98	DF	(The Gambia) GAM	Futty Danso	18	1	5+1	0	10+1	1	0+1	0
Players who appeared for Carolina RailHawks who left the club during the season:
8	DF	(United States) USA	Wes Knight	17	0	10	0	6	0	1	0

=== Goal scorers ===
Place	Position	Nation	Number	Name	NASL Spring Season	NASL Fall Season	U.S. Open Cup	Total
1	FW	(Spain)	10	Nacho Novo	4	6	0	10
2	MF	(South Africa)	11	Ty Shipalane	3	3	0	6
2	MF	(United States)	5	Nazmi Albadawi	0	6	0	6
4	MF	(United States)	4	Neil Hlavaty	2	2	0	4
5	DF	(United States)	19	Blake Wagner	2	0	0	2
5	MF	(United States)	6	Austin da Luz	0	2	0	2
5	FW	(Italy)	7	Simone Bracalello	1	1	0	2
5	DF	(United States)	13	Connor Tobin	1	1	0	2
5	MF	(England)	20	Mark Anderson	1	1	0	2
10	MF	(Japan)	14	Leo Osaki	1	0	0	1
10	DF	(United States)	2	Daniel Scott	0	1	0	1
10	DF	(The Gambia)	98	Futty Danso	0	1	0	1
10	FW	(United States)	21	Tyler Engel	0	1	0	1
10				Own goal	0	1	0	1
TOTALS					15	26	0	41

=== Disciplinary record ===
Number	Nation	Position	Name	NASL Spring Season		NASL Fall Season		U.S. Open Cup		Total	
Number	Nation	Position	Name	Yellow card	Red card	Yellow card	Red card	Yellow card	Red card	Yellow card	Red card
1	(United States)	GK	Hunter Gilstrap	1	0	0	0	0	0	1	0
2	(United States)	DF	Daniel Scott	1	0	1	2	0	0	2	2
3	(Puerto Rico)	DF	Kupono Low	1	0	3	0	0	0	4	0
4	(United States)	MF	Neil Hlavaty	0	0	2	0	0	0	2	0
5	(United States)	MF	Nazmi Albadawi	2	0	4	0	0	0	6	0
6	(United States)	MF	Austin da Luz	0	0	3	0	0	0	3	0
8	(Spain)	DF	Álex Pérez	0	0	1	0	0	0	1	0
9	(United States)	FW	Wells Thompson	0	0	5	2	1	0	6	2
10	(Spain)	FW	Nacho Novo	2	1	3	1	1	0	6	2
12	(United States)	GK	Akira Fitzgerald	1	0	1	0	0	0	2	0
13	(United States)	DF	Connor Tobin	0	0	6	1	0	0	6	1
14	(Japan)	MF	Leo Osaki	1	0	0	0	0	0	1	0
17	(Guyana)	MF	Chris Nurse	3	0	2	0	0	0	5	0
19	(United States)	DF	Blake Wagner	3	0	1	0	0	0	4	0
20	(England)	MF	Mark Anderson	2	0	0	0	0	0	2	0
21	(United States)	FW	Tyler Engel	0	0	2	0	0	0	2	0
22	(United States)	MF	Jamie Dell	0	0	0	0	1	0	1	0
31	(United States)	DF	Steven Miller	0	0	1	0	0	0	1	0
36	(Brazil)	MF	Gabriel	0	0	1	0	0	0	1	0
98	(The Gambia)	DF	Futty Danso	0	0	1	0	0	0	1	0
			TOTALS	17	1	37	6	3	0	57	7
