= 2016 Carolina RailHawks FC season =

Carolina RailHawks
2016 season
- Owner: Stephen Malik
- Head coach: Colin Clarke
- Stadium: WakeMed Soccer Park
- NASL: Spring:7th Fall: TBD Combined: TBD
- Soccer Bowl: TBD
- U.S. Open Cup: TBD
- Top goalscorer: League: Austin da Luz & Brian Shriver (3); All: Brian Shriver (4)
- Highest home attendance: League: 7,107 (May 14 vs. Miami); All: 10,125 (Jul. 12 vs. West Ham)
- Lowest home attendance: League: 4,159 (Apr. 2 vs. Minnesota); All: 1,769 (Jun. 1 vs. Charlotte)
- Average home league attendance: League: 5,109; All: 5,573
Home colors	Away colors

The 2016 Carolina RailHawks season was the club's tenth season of existence, and their sixth consecutive season in the North American Soccer League, the second division of the American soccer pyramid.

== Roster ==
As of July 22, 2016

No.	Position	Nation	Player
1	DF	USA	Macklin Robinson
2	DF	ENG	Paul Black
3	DF	PUR	Kupono Low (Captain)
4	DF	CAN	Drew Beckie
5	DF	USA	Michael Daly
6	MF	USA	Austin da Luz
7	MF	GUA	Marvin Ceballos
8	MF	ENG	Matt Watson
9	FW	USA	Aly Hassan
10	MF	USA	Nazmi Albadawi
11	MF	RSA	Ty Shipalane
12	DF	TTO	Kareem Moses
13	DF	USA	Connor Tobin
16	FW	USA	Matthew Fondy
17	FW	USA	Billy Schuler
20	MF	USA	Jonathon Orlando
21	FW	USA	Brian Shriver
23	MF	USA	Nick Taitague
24	DF	USA	Jeremy Kelly
27	DF	ENG	Simon Mensing
31	DF	USA	Steven Miller
42	MF	HAI	James Marcelin
50	GK	USA	Akira Fitzgerald
92	GK	USA	Brian Sylvestre
99	FW	MEX	Omar Bravo

== Transfers ==
=== Winter ===
In: Note: Flags indicate national team as defined under FIFA eligibility rules; some limited exceptions apply. Players may hold more than one non-FIFA nationality.

No.	Pos.	Nation	Player
1	GK	USA	Macklin Robinson
2	DF	ENG	Paul Black (from (United States) Atlanta Silverbacks)
4	DF	CAN	Drew Beckie (from (Canada) Ottawa Fury)
7	MF	GUA	Marvin Ceballos (from (United States) Indy Eleven)
8	MF	ENG	Matt Watson (from (United States) Chicago Fire)
9	FW	USA	Aly Hassan (from (Canada) Ottawa Fury)
12	DF	TTO	Kareem Moses (from (Canada) Edmonton)
17	FW	USA	Billy Schuler (from (Canada) Whitecaps FC 2)
20	MF	USA	Jonathon Orlando (from (United States) Sporting Maryland)
21	FW	USA	Brian Shriver (from (United States) Tampa Bay Rowdies)
23	MF	USA	Nick Taitague (from (United States) FC Richmond)
27	DF	ENG	Simon Mensing (from (United States) Atlanta Silverbacks)
31	DF	USA	Steven Miller (from (United States) Tulsa Roughnecks)
42	MF	HAI	James Marcelin (from (United States) Fort Lauderdale Strikers)

Out: Note: Flags indicate national team as defined under FIFA eligibility rules; some limited exceptions apply. Players may hold more than one non-FIFA nationality.

No.	Pos.	Nation	Player
1	GK	USA	Hunter Gilstrap (to (United States) Pittsburgh Riverhounds)
4	MF	USA	Neil Hlavaty (to (United States) Fort Lauderdale Strikers)
7	FW	ITA	Simone Bracalello
15	DF	USA	Austen King
17	MF	GUY	Chris Nurse (to Puerto Rico)
18	MF	USA	Jack Coleman
22	MF	CAN	Jamie Dell (to (United States) Cincinnati)
24	FW	USA	Bradlee Baladez
36	MF	BRA	Gabriel
39	FW	USA	Mamadee Nyepon
98	DF	GAM	Mamadou Danso (to (United States) Rayo OKC)

=== Summer ===
In: Note: Flags indicate national team as defined under FIFA eligibility rules; some limited exceptions apply. Players may hold more than one non-FIFA nationality.

No.	Pos.	Nation	Player
5	DF	USA	Michael Daly (loan from (United States) Bethlehem Steel)
16	FW	USA	Matthew Fondy (from (United States) Jacksonville Armada)
99	FW	MEX	Omar Bravo (from (Mexico) C.D. Guadalajara)

Out: Note: Flags indicate national team as defined under FIFA eligibility rules; some limited exceptions apply. Players may hold more than one non-FIFA nationality.

No.	Pos.	Nation	Player
5	DF	ESP	Álex Pérez
9	FW	USA	Aly Hassan (loan to (United States) Charlotte Independence)

== Friendlies ==
February 27, 2016 Preseason	Carolina RailHawks	4–0	UNC Wilmington Seahawks	Cary, North Carolina
11:00 a.m. EST	Schuler; Tobin; Hassan	Report		Stadium: WakeMed Soccer Park

March 4, 2016 Preseason	Carolina RailHawks	3–0	NC State Wolfpack	Raleigh, North Carolina
10:00 a.m. EST	Hassan, Schuler	Report		Stadium: WRAL Soccer Center

March 9, 2016 Preseason	Carolina RailHawks	0–1	Richmond Kickers	Cary, North Carolina
11:00 a.m. EST	Pérez (red card)	Report	Goal	Stadium: WakeMed Soccer Park

March 12, 2016 Preseason	Charlotte Independence	0–1	Carolina RailHawks	Wingate, North Carolina
1:00 p.m. EST		Report	Watson 81'	Stadium: Wingate University

March 16, 2016 Preseason	Richmond Kickers	1–2	Carolina RailHawks	Richmond, Virginia
7:00 p.m. EST	Yeisley 7'	Report	Moses 15'; Black 80'	Stadium: City Stadium

March 26, 2016 Preseason	Carolina RailHawks (United States)	0–3	(Mexico) Toluca	Cary, North Carolina
12:00 p.m. EST	Tobin (yellow card) 38'	Report	Flores 13'; Triverio 15'; Brambila 77'	Stadium: WakeMed Soccer Park; Attendance: 9,032

July 12, 2016 Friendly	Carolina RailHawks (United States)	2–2	(England) West Ham United	Cary, North Carolina
8:00 p.m. EST	Reid 13' (o.g.); Miller (yellow card) 51'; Ceballos 67'	Report	Reid 18'; Carroll 20'; Page (yellow card) 67'; Quina (yellow card) 90+'	Stadium: WakeMed Soccer Park; Attendance: 10,125
Note: All-time club attendance record

== Competitions ==
=== NASL Spring season ===
==== Standings ====
Pos	Team	Pld	W	D	L	GF	GA	GD	Pts	Qualification
1	Indy Eleven (S)	10	4	6	0	15	8	+7	18	Playoffs
2	New York Cosmos	10	6	0	4	15	8	+7	18	
3	FC Edmonton	10	5	2	3	9	7	+2	17	
4	Minnesota United	10	5	1	4	16	12	+4	16	
5	Tampa Bay Rowdies	10	4	4	2	11	9	+2	16	
6	Fort Lauderdale Strikers	10	4	3	3	12	12	0	15	
7	Carolina RailHawks	10	4	2	4	11	13	−2	14	
8	Rayo OKC	10	3	3	4	11	12	−1	12	
9	Ottawa Fury	10	2	3	5	9	14	−5	9	
10	Jacksonville Armada	10	1	4	5	5	11	−6	7	
11	Miami FC	10	1	4	5	7	15	−8	7	

Source: NASL
Rules for classification: 1) points; 2) total goal differential; 3) total goals scored; 4) head-to-head record; 5) away goal differential; 6) away goals scored
(S) Spring season champion

==== Results summary ====
Overall								Home						Away					
Pld	W	D	L	GF	GA	GD	Pts	W	D	L	GF	GA	GD	W	D	L	GF	GA	GD
10	4	2	4	11	13	−2	14	2	2	1	4	4	0	2	0	3	7	9	−2

Last updated: 11 June 2016.
Source: Match reports

==== Results by round ====
Round	1	2	3	4	5	6	7	8	9	10
Stadium	H	A	H	A	A	H	H	A	H	A
Result	W	W	W	W	L	L	D	L	D	L
Position	2	2	1	1	1	2	2	5	5	7

Updated to match(es) played on 11 June 2016. Source: Match reports
A = Away; H = Home; W = Win; D = Draw; L = Loss

==== Matches ====
April 2, 2016 1	Carolina RailHawks	2–1	Minnesota United	Cary
15:00 EST (UTC−5)	Shipalane 13' da Luz 26'; Beckie (yellow card) 40'; Mensing (red card) 88'	Summary	Ramirez 2'; Calvano (yellow card) 54'; Banks (yellow card) 83'	Stadium: WakeMed Soccer Park; Attendance: 4,196; Referee: Mathieu Bourdeau

April 9, 2016 2	Rayo OKC	2–3	Carolina RailHawks	Yukon
20:00 EST (UTC−5)	Johnson 33'; Michel 52'; Kimura (yellow card) 90'	Summary	da Luz 23', 90+6'; Hassan 74'; Beckie (yellow card) 85'	Stadium: Miller Stadium; Attendance: 5,851; Referee: David Gantar

April 16, 2016 3	Carolina RailHawks	1–0	Ottawa Fury	Cary
19:30 EST (UTC−5)	Shipalane 47'; Pérez (yellow card) 50'	Summary	de Jong (yellow card) 36'	Stadium: WakeMed Soccer Park; Attendance: 4,208; Referee: Kevin Terry, Jr.

April 23, 2016 4	Tampa Bay Rowdies	1–3	Carolina RailHawks	St. Petersburg
19:30 EST (UTC−5)	Mkandawire 65'; Guerra (yellow card) 72'; Nanchoff (yellow card) 85'	Summary	Pérez 45', (yellow card) 58'; Marcelin 47'; Beckie (yellow card) 49'; Shriver 87' (pen.)	Stadium: Al Lang Stadium; Attendance: 5,948; Referee: Robert Sibiga

May 1, 2016 5	New York Cosmos	1–0	Carolina RailHawks	Hempstead
EST (UTC−5)	Orozco 45', (yellow card) 74'; Kranjčar (yellow card) 72'; Ayoze (yellow card) 84'	Summary	Marcelin (yellow card) 67'; Albadawi (yellow card) 72'; Mensing (yellow card) 90+6'	Stadium: James M. Shuart Stadium; Attendance: 2,419; Referee: Alex Chilowicz

May 7, 2016 6	Carolina RailHawks	1–3	Fort Lauderdale Strikers	Cary
19:30 EDT	Albadawi (yellow card) 35'; Marcelin (yellow card) 55'; Shriver 67'	Summary	Santos 7'; Attakora 23'; Carvalho 38', (yellow card) 85'; Angulo (yellow card) 45+2'; Restrepo (yellow card) 83'; Gentile (yellow card) 90+6'	Stadium: WakeMed Soccer Park; Attendance: 5,216; Referee: Guido Gonzalez Jr.

May 14, 2016 7	Carolina RailHawks	0–0	Miami	Cary
19:30 EDT		Summary	Adaílton (yellow card) 31'; Trafford (yellow card) 72'	Stadium: WakeMed Soccer Park; Attendance: 7,107; Referee: Baboucarr Jallow

May 22, 2016 8	Edmonton	1–0	Carolina RailHawks	Edmonton
16:00 EST (UTC−5)	Ledgerwood (yellow card) 27'; Ameobi (yellow card) 34'; Fordyce 79'	Summary	Black (yellow card) 34'; Tobin (yellow card) 78'	Stadium: Clarke Stadium; Attendance: 1,338; Referee: Francis Latulippe

June 4, 2016 9	Carolina RailHawks	0–0	Jacksonville Armada	Cary
20:55 EDT		Summary	Keita (yellow card) 61'	Stadium: WakeMed Soccer Park; Attendance: 5,786; Referee: Alejandro Mariscal

June 11, 2016 10	Indy Eleven	4–1	Carolina RailHawks	Indianapolis
19:30 EDT	Zayed 16', 65', 85'; Braun 45+1'	Summary	Albadawi 29'; Mensing (yellow card) 45'	Stadium: Carroll Stadium; Attendance: 9,341; Referee: Marcos de Oliveira

=== NASL Fall season ===
==== Standings ====
Pos	Team	Pld	W	D	L	GF	GA	GD	Pts	Qualification
1	New York Cosmos (F)	22	14	5	3	44	21	+23	47	Playoffs
2	Indy Eleven	22	11	4	7	36	25	+11	37	
3	FC Edmonton	22	10	6	6	16	14	+2	36	
4	Rayo OKC	22	9	8	5	28	21	+7	35	
5	Miami FC	22	9	6	7	31	27	+4	33	
6	Fort Lauderdale Strikers	22	7	5	10	19	28	−9	26	
7	Carolina RailHawks	22	7	5	10	25	35	−10	26	
8	Minnesota United	22	6	7	9	25	25	0	25	
9	Puerto Rico	22	5	9	8	19	31	−12	24	
10	Tampa Bay Rowdies	22	5	8	9	29	32	−3	23	
11	Jacksonville Armada	22	5	8	9	25	35	−10	23	
12	Ottawa Fury	22	5	7	10	23	26	−3	22	

Source: NASL
Rules for classification: 1) points; 2) total goal differential; 3) total goals scored; 4) head-to-head record; 5) away goal differential; 6) away goals scored
(F) Fall season champion

==== Results ====
Overall								Home						Away					
Pld	W	D	L	GF	GA	GD	Pts	W	D	L	GF	GA	GD	W	D	L	GF	GA	GD
8	2	3	3	13	16	−3	9	1	2	0	9	6	+3	1	1	3	4	10	−6

Last updated: 18 August 2016.
Source: Match reports

==== Results by round ====
Round	1	2	3	4	5	6	7	8	9	10	11	12	13	14	15	16	17	18	19	20	21	22
Stadium	A	H	A	H	A	A	A	H	H	A	H	H	A	A	H	H	A	H	H	A	H	A
Result	L	W	W	D	L	L	D	D														
Position	12	7	5	6	6	8	8	9														

Updated to match(es) played on 18 August 2016. Source: Match reports
A = Away; H = Home; W = Win; D = Draw; L = Loss

==== Matches ====
July 2, 2016 1	Minnesota United	5–1	Carolina RailHawks	Blaine
20:00 EDT	Ramirez 20', 24', 75'; Pinho 45+1'; Calvano 47'; Brovsky (yellow card) 58' (yellow-red card) 67'; Davis (yellow card) 79'	CAR Report; NASL Report	Beckie (yellow card) 26'; Watson (yellow card) 78', (goal) 90'	Stadium: National Sports Center; Attendance: 7,909; Referee: Younes Marrakchi

July 9, 2016 2	Carolina RailHawks	4–1	Tampa Bay Rowdies	Cary
19:30 EDT	Fondy 11'; Shriver 55' (pen.); Albadawi 59' (pen.), 71'; Hassan (yellow card) 86'	CAR Report; NASL Report	Hristov 20' (pen.); Guerra (yellow card) 22'	Stadium: WakeMed Soccer Park; Attendance: 4,176; Referee: Nima Saghafi

July 16, 2016 3	Fort Lauderdale Strikers	0–1	Carolina RailHawks	Fort Lauderdale
19:00 EDT	Núñez (yellow card) 44' (yellow-red card) 90+1'; Corrales (yellow card) 52'; James (yellow card) 73'	Summary	Shriver 23'; Fondy (yellow card) 59'	Stadium: Lockhart Stadium; Attendance: 1,082; Referee: Geoff Gamble

July 22, 2016 4	Carolina RailHawks	3–3	Miami	Cary
19:30 EDT	Fondy 30'; Marcelin (yellow card) 58'; Shriver 61'; Bravo 78'; Beckie (yellow card) 82'; Mensing (yellow card) 84'	Summary	Chavez 7', 80'; Poku 37' (yellow card) 90'; Trafford (yellow card) 65'	Stadium: WakeMed Soccer Park; Attendance: 6,060; Referee: Marcos de Oliveira

July 27, 2016 5	Ottawa Fury	2–0	Carolina RailHawks	Ottawa
19:00 EDT	Haworth 8'; Beckie 49' (o.g.); Bailey (yellow card) 68'	Summary	Mensing (yellow card) 27'; Daly (yellow card) 83'	Stadium: TD Place Stadium; Attendance: 4,547; Referee: Kevin Terry

July 30, 2016 6	Edmonton	1–0	Carolina RailHawks	Edmonton
16:00 EDT	Keegan 66'	Summary	Mensing (yellow card) 61'; Beckie (yellow card) 74' da Luz (yellow card) 79'	Stadium: Clarke Stadium; Attendance: 1,904; Referee: Pierre Luce Lauziere

August 6, 2016 7	Jacksonville Armada	2–2	Carolina RailHawks	Jacksonville
19:00 EDT	Eloundou 19', 50'; George (yellow card) 25'	Summary	Fondy 6' da Luz (yellow card) 33' (yellow-red card) 70'; Black (yellow card) 49'; Bravo 68'	Stadium: Community First Park; Attendance: 3,601; Referee: Nima Saghafi

August 13, 2016 8	Carolina RailHawks	2–2	Puerto Rico	Cary
19:30 EDT	Bravo 40' (yellow card) 90+2'; Fondy 89'	Summary	Paulo 52'; Ramos 67'	Stadium: WakeMed Soccer Park; Attendance: 6,056; Referee: Alex Chilowicz

August 21, 2016 9	Carolina RailHawks	–	Indy Eleven	Cary
19:30 EDT		[ Summary]		Stadium: WakeMed Soccer Park

=== U.S. Open Cup ===
June 1, 2016 Third round	Carolina RailHawks	5–0 (a.e.t.)	Charlotte Independence	Cary
19:30 EDT	Schuler 92', 115'; Albadawi 96'; Shriver 99'; Orlando 109'	Summary	Davidson (red card) 29'; Slogic (yellow card) 76'	Stadium: WakeMed Soccer Park; Attendance: 1,769; Referee: Neil Barbulescu

June 15, 2016 Fourth round	Carolina RailHawks	0–1 (a.e.t.)	New England Revolution	Cary
19:30 EDT	Marcelin (yellow card) 45'; Beckie (yellow card) 54'; Shriver (yellow card) 120'	Summary	Woodberry (yellow card) 56'; Kamara (yellow card) 85'; Herivaux 103'	Stadium: WakeMed Soccer Park; Attendance: 4,147; Referee: Kevin Terry

== Squad statistics ==
As of match played 13 August 2016

=== Appearances and goals ===
No.	Pos	Nat	Player	Total		NASL Spring Season		NASL Fall Season		U.S. Open Cup	
No.	Pos	Nat	Player	Apps	Goals	Apps	Goals	Apps	Goals	Apps	Goals
2	DF	(England) ENG	Paul Black	17	0	10	0	5	0	2	0
3	DF	(Puerto Rico) PUR	Kupono Low	1	0	0+1	0	0	0	0	0
4	DF	(Canada) CAN	Drew Beckie	18	0	7+1	0	8	0	2	0
5	DF	(United States) USA	Michael Daly	5	0	0	0	4+1	0	0	0
6	MF	(United States) USA	Austin da Luz	18	3	9	3	6+1	0	2	0
7	MF	(Guatemala) GUA	Marvin Ceballos	10	0	0+3	0	1+5	0	1	0
8	MF	(England) ENG	Matt Watson	17	1	7+2	0	5+1	1	2	0
10	MF	(United States) USA	Nazmi Albadawi	17	4	10	1	5	2	2	1
11	MF	(South Africa) RSA	Ty Shipalane	18	2	9+1	2	7	0	1	0
12	DF	(Trinidad and Tobago) TTO	Kareem Moses	12	0	4+2	0	5+1	0	0	0
13	DF	(United States) USA	Connor Tobin	14	0	10	0	1+1	0	2	0
16	FW	(United States) USA	Matthew Fondy	7	4	0	0	6+1	4	0	0
17	FW	(United States) USA	Billy Schuler	9	2	3+2	0	1+1	0	0+2	2
20	MF	(United States) USA	Jonathon Orlando	11	1	0+3	0	1+5	0	0+2	1
21	FW	(United States) USA	Brian Shriver	20	6	10	2	7+1	3	2	1
23	MF	(United States) USA	Nick Taitague	4	0	0+4	0	0	0	0	0
24	DF	(United States) USA	Jeremy Kelly	2	0	1	0	0	0	0+1	0
27	DF	(England) ENG	Simon Mensing	16	0	5+3	0	6	0	2	0
31	DF	(United States) USA	Steven Miller	4	0	0	0	3+1	0	0	0
42	MF	(Haiti) HAI	James Marcelin	11	1	6	1	4	0	1	0
50	GK	(United States) USA	Akira Fitzgerald	12	0	7	0	3	0	2	0
92	GK	(United States) USA	Brian Sylvestre	8	0	3	0	5	0	0	0
99	FW	(Mexico) MEX	Omar Bravo	4	3	0	0	4	3	0	0
Players away on loan:
9	FW	(United States) USA	Aly Hassan	10	1	0+5	1	1+4	0	0	0
Players who left Carolina RailHawks during the season:
5	DF	(Spain) ESP	Álex Pérez	12	1	9+1	1	0	0	1+1	0

=== Goal scorers ===
Place	Position	Nation	Number	Name	NASL Spring Season	NASL Fall Season	U.S. Open Cup	Total
1	FW	(United States)	21	Brian Shriver	2	3	1	6
2	FW	(United States)	16	Matthew Fondy	0	4	0	4
2	FW	(United States)	10	Nazmi Albadawi	1	2	1	4
4	MF	(United States)	6	Austin da Luz	3	0	0	3
4	FW	(Mexico)	99	Omar Bravo	0	2	0	2
6	MF	(South Africa)	11	Ty Shipalane	2	0	0	2
6	FW	(United States)	17	Billy Schuler	0	0	2	0
8	DF	(Spain)	5	Álex Pérez	1	0	0	1
8	FW	(United States)	9	Aly Hassan	1	0	0	1
8	MF	(Haiti)	42	James Marcelin	1	0	0	1
8	MF	(England)	8	Matt Watson	0	1	0	1
8	MF	(United States)	20	Jonathon Orlando	0	0	1	1
TOTALS					11	13	5	29

=== Disciplinary record ===
Number	Nation	Position	Name	NASL Spring Season		NASL Fall Season		U.S. Open Cup		Total	
Number	Nation	Position	Name	Yellow card	Red card	Yellow card	Red card	Yellow card	Red card	Yellow card	Red card
2	(England)	DF	Paul Black	1	0	1	0	0	0	2	0
4	(United States)	DF	Drew Beckie	3	0	3	0	1	0	7	0
5	(Spain)	DF	Álex Pérez	2	0	0	0	0	0	2	0
5	(United States)	DF	Michael Daly	0	0	1	0	0	0	1	0
6	(United States)	MF	Austin da Luz	0	0	3	1	0	0	3	1
8	(England)	MF	Matt Watson	0	0	1	0	0	0	1	0
9	(United States)	FW	Aly Hassan	0	0	1	0	0	0	1	0
10	(United States)	MF	Nazmi Albadawi	2	0	0	0	0	0	2	0
13	(United States)	DF	Connor Tobin	1	0	0	0	0	0	1	0
16	(United States)	FW	Matthew Fondy	0	0	1	0	0	0	1	0
21	(United States)	FW	Brian Shriver	0	0	0	0	1	0	1	0
27	(England)	DF	Simon Mensing	2	1	3	0	0	0	5	1
42	(Haiti)	MF	James Marcelin	2	0	1	0	1	0	4	0
99	(Mexico)	FW	Omar Bravo	0	0	1	0	0	0	1	0
			TOTALS	13	1	16	1	3	0	32	2
