= 2014 Carolina RailHawks FC season =

Carolina RailHawks
2014 season
- Owner: Traffic Sports USA
- Head Coach: Colin Clarke
- Stadium: WakeMed Soccer Park
- NASL: Spring: 4th place Fall: TBD Combined: TBD
- Soccer Bowl: TBD
- U.S. Open Cup: TBD
- Top goalscorer: League: Schilawski (3 goals); All: Schilawski (5 goals)
- Highest home attendance: 7,856 (May 31 v. Tampa Bay)
- Lowest home attendance: League: 3,080 (July 12 v. Indy); All: 1,432 (May 29 v. Charlotte)
- Average home league attendance: League: 4,907; All: 4,357
Home colors	Away colors

The 2014 Carolina RailHawks season was the club's eighth season of existence, and their fourth consecutive season in North American Soccer League, the second division of the American soccer pyramid.

The season followed the Spring/Fall format adopted by the NASL in 2013 with the Spring season starting on April 12 and lasting for 9 games until June 8, while the Fall season would begin the night before the 2014 World Cup Final on July 12 and lasted 18 games until November 1. The winner of the Spring championship would again host the 2014 Soccer Bowl.

== Competitions ==
=== Pre-season and Exhibitions ===
==== Pre-season ====
March 18, 2014 Preseason	Carolina RailHawks	0 - 1	UNC Wilmington Seahawks	Cary, North Carolina
5:00 p.m. EST		Report	Goal	Stadium: WakeMed Soccer Park

March 22, 2014 Preseason	Carolina RailHawks	2 - 2	North Carolina Tar Heels	Cary, North Carolina
5:00 p.m. EST	Martínez,	Report	Goal	Stadium: WakeMed Soccer Park

March 28, 2014 Preseason	Carolina RailHawks	2 - 2	NC State Wolfpack	Cary, North Carolina
9:30 a.m. EST				Stadium: WakeMed Soccer Park

March 29, 2014 Preseason	Carolina RailHawks	canceled	Charlotte Eagles	Cary, North Carolina
1:00 p.m. EST				Stadium: WakeMed Soccer Park

April 6, 2014 Preseason	Carolina RailHawks	7 - 0	Old Dominion Monarchs	Cary, North Carolina
12:00 p.m. EST				Stadium: WakeMed Soccer Park

==== Exhibitions ====
May 2, 2014 Exhibition	Carolina RailHawks	2 - 1	United States U-20	Cary, North Carolina
	Aa. King; Osaki	Report	Harkes	Stadium: WakeMed Soccer Park

July 6, 2014 Exhibition	Carolina RailHawks (United States)	2 - 1	(Mexico) Puebla F.C.	Cary, North Carolina
4:00 p.m. EST	Donovan 38'; Shipalane 66'	Report	Acuña 88'	Stadium: WakeMed Soccer Park; Attendance: 6,155

=== NASL Spring Season ===
The Spring season lasted for 9 games beginning on April 12 and ending on June 8. The schedule featured a single round robin format with each team playing every other team in the league a single time. Half the teams would host 5 home games and play 4 road games whereas the other half of the teams would play 4 home games and 5 road games.

==== Standings ====
Pos	Team	Pld	W	D	L	GF	GA	GD	Pts	Qualification
1	Minnesota United (S)	9	6	2	1	16	9	+7	20	Playoffs
2	New York Cosmos	9	6	1	2	14	3	+11	19	
3	San Antonio Scorpions	9	5	2	2	13	9	+4	17	
4	Carolina RailHawks	9	4	2	3	11	15	−4	14	
5	Fort Lauderdale Strikers	9	4	1	4	18	18	0	13	
6	Ottawa Fury	9	3	1	5	14	13	+1	10	
7	Tampa Bay Rowdies	9	2	4	3	11	16	−5	10	
8	Atlanta Silverbacks	9	3	1	5	12	20	−8	10	
9	FC Edmonton	9	2	2	5	11	11	0	8	
10	Indy Eleven	9	0	4	5	14	20	−6	4	

Source: NASL Standings
(S) Spring season champion

==== Results ====
Overall								Home						Away					
Pld	W	D	L	GF	GA	GD	Pts	W	D	L	GF	GA	GD	W	D	L	GF	GA	GD
9	4	2	3	11	15	−4	14	4	0	0	9	1	+8	0	2	3	2	14	−12

Last updated: July 10, 2014.
Source: http://www.nasl.com/standings/season/8945

===== Results by round =====
Round	1	2	3	4	5	6	7	8	9
Ground	A	H	A	H	A	H	A	H	A
Result	D	W	L	W	L	W	D	W	L
Position									

Updated to match(es) played on July 10, 2014. Source: nasl.com
A = Away; H = Home; W = Win; D = Draw; L = Loss

==== Match reports ====
April 12, 2014 Match 1	Indy Eleven	1 - 1	Carolina Railhawks	Indianapolis, Indiana
7:30 p.m. EDT	Ambersley 43'	Report; Report	Burt (yellow card) 6'; Schilawski 50'; Scott (yellow card) 62'	Stadium: Carroll Stadium; Attendance: 11,048; Referee: Chris Penso

April 20, 2014 Match 2	Carolina Railhawks	4 - 1	Fort Lauderdale Strikers	Cary, North Carolina
7:30 p.m. EDT	Martínez 27' (pen.), 72'; Millington (yellow card) 37'; Schilawski 40' 76'; Elizondo (yellow card) 46'; Burt (yellow card) 82'	Report; Report	Nurse (yellow card) 33', (goal) 47'	Stadium: WakeMed Soccer Park; Attendance: 4,007; Referee: Mark Kadlecik

April 26, 2014 Match 3	Ottawa Fury FC	4 - 0	Carolina RailHawks	Ottawa, Ontario
7:30 p.m. EDT	Oliver 34', 72'; Davies (yellow card) 51', (goal) 56'	Report; Report	Low (yellow card) 41'; Ståhl (yellow card) 71'	Stadium: Keith Harris Stadium; Attendance: 2,158; Referee: David Barrie

May 3, 2014 Match 4	Carolina RailHawks	1 - 0	New York Cosmos	Cary, North Carolina
7:30 p.m. EDT	Shipalane 12'; Tobin (yellow card) (red card) 63'; Low (yellow card) (red card) 68'	Report; Report	Guenzatti (red card) 56'	Stadium: WakeMed Soccer Park; Attendance: 4,066; Referee: Jorge Gonzalez

May 10, 2014 Match 5	San Antonio Scorpions	3 - 0	Carolina RailHawks	San Antonio, Texas
8:30 p.m. EDT	deRoux (yellow card) 20'; Janicki (yellow card) 33'; Hassli 53'; Barrera 59', (yellow card) 88'; Zahorski 77'	Report	Scott (yellow card) 41'; Schilawski (yellow card) 76'	Stadium: Toyota Field; Attendance: 5,834; Referee: Daniel Fitzgerald

May 17, 2014 Match 6	Carolina RailHawks	2 - 0	Atlanta Silverbacks	Cary, North Carolina
7:30 p.m. EDT	Grella 16'; Tobin 36'; Ståhl (yellow card) 86'	Report; Report	Reiss (yellow card) 46'; Canovas (yellow card) 76'	Stadium: WakeMed Soccer Park; Attendance: 5,527; Referee: Marcos DeOliveira

May 24, 2014 Match 7	Minnesota United FC	0 - 0	Carolina RailHawks	Blaine, Minnesota
8:00 p.m. EDT	Jordan (yellow card) 39'; Juliano (yellow card) 78'; Cristiano (red card) 86'; Daley (red card) 90+3'	Report; Report	Schilawski (yellow card) 26'	Stadium: National Sports Center; Attendance: 6,784; Referee: Sorin Stoica

May 31, 2014 Match 8	Carolina RailHawks	2 - 0	Tampa Bay Rowdies	Cary, North Carolina
7:30 p.m. EDT	Grella 18', (yellow card) 67'; Shipalane 71'; Scott (yellow card) 83'	Report; Report	Clinton (yellow card) 48'; Hunt (yellow card) 54'	Stadium: WakeMed Soccer Park; Attendance: 7,856; Referee: Alan Kelly

June 8, 2014 Match 9	FC Edmonton	6 - 1	Carolina RailHawks	Edmonton, Alberta
4:00 p.m. EDT	Fordyce 1', 44', 75'; Ameobi 13'; Laing 31'; Jalali 90'	Report; Report	Grella (yellow card) 31'; Au. King (yellow card) 64'; Tobin 74'	Stadium: Clarke Stadium; Attendance: 3,641; Referee: Francis Latulippe

=== NASL Fall Season ===
The Fall season lasted for 18 games beginning on July 12 and ending on November 1. The schedule featured a double round robin format with each team playing every other team in the league twice, one at home and one on the road. The winner of the Fall season played the winner of the Spring season in the Soccer Bowl 2014 Championship game except if the Spring and Fall Champions are the same team in which case the team with the best overall Spring and Fall record behind that team would be their opponent.

==== Standings ====
Pos	Team	Pld	W	D	L	GF	GA	GD	Pts	Qualification
1	San Antonio Scorpions (F)	18	11	2	5	30	15	+15	35	Playoffs
2	Minnesota United	18	10	5	3	31	19	+12	35	
3	FC Edmonton	18	8	5	5	23	18	+5	29	
4	Fort Lauderdale Strikers	18	7	6	5	20	21	−1	27	
5	Carolina RailHawks	18	7	3	8	27	28	−1	24	
6	New York Cosmos	18	5	8	5	23	24	−1	23	
7	Indy Eleven	18	6	5	7	21	26	−5	23	
8	Tampa Bay Rowdies	18	5	5	8	25	34	−9	20	
9	Ottawa Fury	18	4	5	9	20	25	−5	17	
10	Atlanta Silverbacks	18	3	4	11	20	30	−10	13	

Source: NASL Standings
(F) Fall season champion

==== Results ====
Overall								Home						Away					
Pld	W	D	L	GF	GA	GD	Pts	W	D	L	GF	GA	GD	W	D	L	GF	GA	GD
3	0	0	3	1	5	−4	0	0	0	1	1	2	−1	0	0	2	0	3	−3

Last updated: 24 July 2014.

===== Results by round =====
Round	1	2	3	4	5	6	7	8	9	10	11	12	13	14	15	16	17	18
Ground	H	A	A	H	A	H	H	A	H	A	H	H	A	A	A	H	A	H
Result	L	L	L															
Position	8	9	10															

Updated to match(es) played on 24 July 2014. Source: Spring season 2014 results
A = Away; H = Home; W = Win; D = Draw; L = Loss

==== Match reports ====
July 12, 2014 Match 1	Carolina RailHawks	1 - 2	Indy Eleven	Cary, North Carolina
7:30 p.m. EDT	Martínez 24'; Au. King (red card) 57'; Albadawi (yellow card) 62'; Low (yellow card) 85'	Report; Report	Estridge (yellow card) 10'; Spencer 65'; Smart 87'	Stadium: WakeMed Soccer Park; Attendance: 3,080; Referee: Chris Penso

July 17, 2014 Match 2	Minnesota United FC	1 - 0	Carolina RailHawks	Blaine, Minnesota, USA
8:00 p.m. EDT	Mendes 26'; Davis (red card) 81'; Calvano (yellow card) 85'	Report; Report	Low (red card) 82'	Stadium: National Sports Center; Attendance: 7,287; Referee: Younes Marrakchi

July 23, 2014 Match 3	San Antonio Scorpions	2 - 0	Carolina RailHawks	San Antonio, Texas
8:30 p.m. EDT	Castillo (yellow card) 23' (goal) 62'; Forbes 64'	Report	Bentick (yellow card) 35'; Albadawi (yellow card) 42'; Elizondo (yellow card) 89'	Stadium: Toyota Field; Attendance: 7,884; Referee: Marcos de Oliveira

July 26, 2014 Match 4	Carolina RailHawks	3 - 0	Ottawa Fury FC	Cary, North Carolina
7:30 p.m. EDT	Schilawski 10', Schilawski 38', Albadawi 48'			Stadium: WakeMed Soccer Park; Attendance: 4,294; Referee: Kevin Terry Jr.

August 2, 2014 Match 5	New York Cosmos	0 - 1	Carolina RailHawks	Hempstead, New York
7:00 p.m. EDT			Shipalane 38'	Stadium: James M. Shuart Stadium; Attendance: 4,649; Referee: Alex Chilowicz

August 9, 2014 Match 6	Carolina RailHawks	3 - 4	Tampa Bay Rowdies	Cary, North Carolina
7:30 p.m. EDT	Schilawski 48', Martinez 51', Rodrigues 868' (OG)		Walker 3', Mkandawire 10', Mkosana 77', Russell 84'	Stadium: WakeMed Soccer Park; Attendance: 3,140

August 16, 2014 Match 7	Carolina RailHawks	2 - 3	FC Edmonton	Cary, North Carolina
7:30 p.m. EDT				Stadium: WakeMed Soccer Park

August 23, 2014 Match 8	Tampa Bay Rowdies	0 - 1	Carolina RailHawks	St. Petersburg, Florida
7:30 p.m. EDT				Stadium: Al Lang Field

August 30, 2014 Match 9	Carolina RailHawks	0 - 2	Atlanta Silverbacks	Cary, North Carolina
7:30 p.m. EDT				Stadium: WakeMed Soccer Park; Attendance: 3,106

September 7, 2014 Match 10	Ottawa Fury FC	2 - 2	Carolina RailHawks	Ottawa, Ontario
3:00 p.m. EDT				Stadium: TD Place Stadium; Attendance: 5269; Referee: Justin Tasev

September 13, 2014 Match 11	Carolina RailHawks	3 - 1	San Antonio Scorpions	Cary, North Carolina
7:30 p.m. EDT				Stadium: WakeMed Soccer Park; Attendance: 3,193

September 20, 2014 Match 12	Carolina RailHawks	5 - 4	New York Cosmos	Cary, North Carolina
7:30 p.m. EDT				Stadium: WakeMed Soccer Park; Attendance: 5,593

September 27, 2014 Match 13	Indy Eleven	0 - 1	Carolina RailHawks	Indianapolis, Indiana
7:30 p.m. EDT				Stadium: Carroll Stadium; Attendance: 10,285

October 4, 2014 Match 14	Ft. Lauderdale Strikers	1 - 0	Carolina RailHawks	Ft. Lauderdale, Florida
7:30 p.m. EDT				Stadium: Lockhart Stadium

October 12, 2014 Match 15	FC Edmonton	3 - 0	Carolina RailHawks	Edmonton, Alberta
4:00 p.m. EDT				Stadium: Clarke Stadium

October 18, 2014 Match 16	Carolina RailHawks	1 - 1	Ft. Lauderdale Strikers	Cary, North Carolina
7:30 p.m. EDT				Stadium: WakeMed Soccer Park

October 25, 2014 Match 17	Atlanta Silverbacks	0 - 2	Carolina RailHawks	Atlanta, Georgia
6:30 p.m. EDT				Stadium: Atlanta Silvebacks Park

November 1, 2014 Match 18	Carolina RailHawks	2 - 2	Minnesota United FC	Cary, North Carolina
7:30 p.m. EDT				Stadium: WakeMed Soccer Park

=== U.S. Open Cup ===
The RailHawks will compete in the 2014 edition of the Open Cup.

May 29, 2014 Third Round	Carolina Railhawks	2 - 0	Charlotte Eagles	Cary, North Carolina
7:30 p.m. EDT	Albadawi 14'; Au. King (yellow card) 15'; Ståhl (yellow card) 37'; Davidson 45'	Report	Thompson (yellow card) 80'	Stadium: WakeMed Soccer Park; Attendance: 1,432

June 14, 2014 Fourth Round	Carolina Railhawks	1 - 1 (3 - 2 p)	Chivas USA	Cary, North Carolina
8:00 p.m. EDT	Schilawski 29'; Ståhl (yellow card) 53'; Tobin (yellow card) 118'	Report; Box Score	Finley 40'	Stadium: WakeMed Soccer Park; Attendance: 4,273
	Penalties
	Albadawi (penalty missed); Tobin (penalty scored); Low (penalty missed); Schilawki (penalty scored); Martínez (penalty missed); Aa. King (penalty missed); Jackson (penalty scored)		(penalty scored) Pelletieri; (penalty scored) Torres; (penalty missed) Zavaleta; (penalty missed) Kennedy; (penalty missed) Avila; (penalty missed) Tyrpak; (penalty missed) Delgado

June 24, 2014 Fifth Round	Carolina Railhawks	1 - 0	LA Galaxy	Cary, North Carolina
7:00 p.m. EDT	Low (yellow card) 35'; Scott (yellow card) 44'; Jackson 105'	Report; Box Score	DeLaGarza (yellow card) 45+3'; Sarvas (yellow card) 113'	Stadium: WakeMed Soccer Park, Field #2; Attendance: 3,000; Referee: Fotis Bazakos

July 9, 2014 Quarterfinals	Carolina Railhawks	2 - 5	FC Dallas	Cary, North Carolina
7:30 p.m. EDT	Schilawski 9'; Albadawi (yellow card) 15'; Martínez 37' (pen.); Low (yellow card) 61'	Report; Box Score	Pérez 22', 34', 90+3'; Castillo 44'; Jacobson (yellow card) 76'; Díaz 89'	Stadium: WakeMed Soccer Park; Attendance: 4,169; Referee: Ricardo Salazar
