= Austin da Luz =

American soccer player (born 1987)

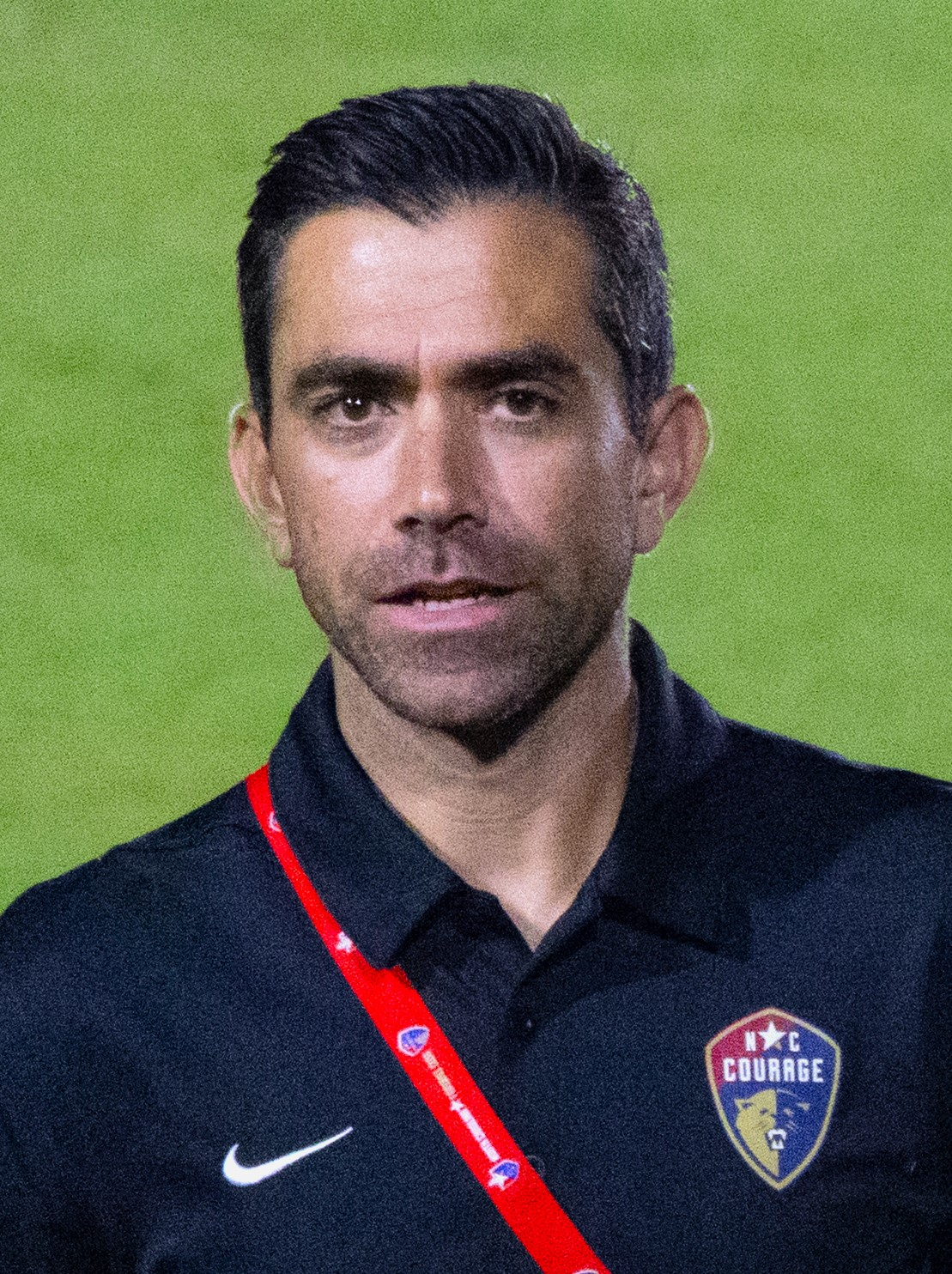
- Da Luz in 2025

Personal information
- Full name: Austin da Luz
- Date of birth: October 9, 1987 (age 39)
- Place of birth: San Diego, California, United States
- Height: 5 ft 10 in (1.78 m)
- Position: Midfielder

College career
Years	Team	Apps	(Gls)
2006−2009	Wake Forest Demon Deacons	80	(13)

Senior career*
Years	Team	Apps	(Gls)
2008	Austin Aztex U23	6	(3)
2010−2011	New York Red Bulls	7	(1)
2011	D.C. United	14	(0)
2012−2013	Carolina RailHawks	35	(5)
2014	Orlando City	18	(5)
2014−2019	North Carolina FC	131	(16)
Total		211	(30)
- * Club domestic league appearances and goals as of October 10, 2019

Austin da Luz (born October 9, 1987) is an American former professional soccer player.

== Career ==
=== Youth and college ===
Da Luz attended St. Stephen's Episcopal School Soccer Academy in Austin, Texas, where he was exposed to high levels of intensive training and competition on a regular basis and was able to travel and participate in international tournament play. Da Luz played college soccer at Wake Forest University from 2006 to 2009, appearing in 80 games, scoring 13 goals and adding 39 assists. He was a member of Wake Forest's 2007 NCAA College Cup Championship team.

During his college years da Luz also played for Austin Aztex U23 in the USL Premier Development League.

=== Professional ===
Da Luz was drafted in the first round (14th overall) of the 2010 MLS SuperDraft by New York Red Bulls. In the semi-finals of the pre-season 2010 Walt Disney World Pro Soccer Classic, da Luz scored the winning goal in the penalty kick shoot-out against the Houston Dynamo, topping off the score at 6-5 and helping the New York Red Bulls reach the final.

He made his professional debut on April 27, 2010, in a U.S. Open Cup game against Philadelphia Union, and made his MLS debut against the Vancouver Whitecaps on May 28, 2011. On June 19, 2011, da Luz scored his first goal for New York and assisted on a Thierry Henry goal in a 3–3 draw with Portland Timbers.

On July 18, 2011, da Luz was traded to D.C. United for use of an international roster slot for the remainder of 2011.

Da Luz signed with NASL club Carolina RailHawks on April 4, 2012, and stayed with the club for two seasons. In 2014, he signed with USL Pro side Orlando City. He was released upon the conclusion of the 2014 season, a casualty of the Orlando City's transition to Major League Soccer. He re-signed with Carolina RailHawks after his release by Orlando City.

On August 13, 2019, da Luz announced he would retire at the end of the 2019 USL Championship season.

== Post-retirement ==
For the 2020 USL Championship season, da Luz became a color commentator for North Carolina FC television broadcasts.

In 2025, he became the director of scouting for the North Carolina Courage.

== Personal life ==
He is the son of Wake Forest Demon Deacons women's soccer coach Tony da Luz.

== Career statistics ==
As of October 10, 2019

Club	Season	League			Cup		Continental		Total	
Club	Season	League	Apps	Goals	Apps	Goals	Apps	Goals	Apps	Goals
New York Red Bulls	2010	Major League Soccer	0	0	1	0	–	–	1	0
New York Red Bulls	2011	Major League Soccer	7	1	2	0	–	–	9	1
New York Red Bulls	Totals		7	1	3	0	0	0	10	1
D.C. United	2011	Major League Soccer	14	0	0	0	–	–	14	0
Carolina RailHawks	2012	North American Soccer League	19	1	2	0	–	–	21	1
Carolina RailHawks	2013	North American Soccer League	17	4	3	1	–	–	20	5
Carolina RailHawks	Totals		36	5	5	1	0	0	41	6
Orlando City	2014	USL Pro	19	5	2	1	–	–	21	6
North Carolina FC	2014	North American Soccer League	6	0	0	0	–	–	6	0
North Carolina FC	2015	North American Soccer League	20	2	0	0	–	–	20	2
North Carolina FC	2016	North American Soccer League	30	5	2	0	–	–	32	5
North Carolina FC	2017	North American Soccer League	27	2	2	0	–	–	29	2
North Carolina FC	2018	USL Championship	31	5	3	1	–	–	34	6
North Carolina FC	2019	USL Championship	17	2	1	0	–	–	18	2
North Carolina FC	Totals		131	16	8	1	0	0	139	17
Career totals			207	27	20	3	0	0	225	30
