= Connor Tobin =

American soccer player (born 1987)

Personal information
- Full name: Connor Tobin
- Date of birth: February 11, 1987 (age 39)
- Place of birth: Fort Collins, Colorado, United States
- Height: 1.88 m (6 ft 2 in)
- Position: Defender

College career
Years	Team	Apps	(Gls)
2005–2008	Vermont Catamounts		

Senior career*
Years	Team	Apps	(Gls)
2009–2010	Nybergsund	19	(0)
2011	Rochester Rhinos	15	(1)
2012–2013	Minnesota United	28	(1)
2014–2018	North Carolina FC	129	(5)
2019–2021	Forward Madison	70	(3)
2022–	Vermont Green	2	(1)
- * Club domestic league appearances and goals as of July 26, 2022

Connor Tobin (born February 11, 1987) is an American soccer player.

== Career ==
=== College ===
Tobin was born in Fort Collins, Colorado. He attended the University of Vermont where he was a standout player for the Catamounts. He played in 77 games during his collegiate career ending with 12 points on four goals and four assists.

During his college career Tobin received numerous accolades. He was named to the America East All-Rookie Team and America East Commissioners Academic Honor Roll as a freshman in 2005; was named to the America East All-Conference Second Team, the America East All-Academic Team, the America East All-Championship Team and the America East Commissioners Academic Honor Roll as a sophomore in 2006; was the America East Men's Soccer Scholar-Athlete of the Year and was named to the America East All-Conference First Team, the America East All-Championship Team, the America East All-Academic Team, the NSCAA All-Northeast Region Third Team, the ESPN The Magazine Academic All-District I Second Team and the America East Commissioners Academic Honor Roll as a sophomore in 2007; and was named to the 2008–09 America East Academic Honor Roll, the ESPN The Magazine Academic All-America First Team, the America East All-Conference First Team, the NSCAA All-Northeast District Second Team, the ESPN The Magazine Academic All-District I First Team, the America East All-Academic Team, the NSCAA Scholar All-America Second Team, the NSCAA Scholar All-East Region First Team as a senior in 2008, as well as being a candidate for the Lowe's Senior CLASS Award and the 2008 America East Defender of the Year.

=== Professional ===
Having trained with English club Sheffield United during the spring of 2008, Tobin signed a one-year contract with Norwegian club with Nybergsund on February 16, 2009, after a two-week trial period in which he started in the team's preseason games. He went on to play 19 games for Nybergsund.

Tobin returned to the United States in 2011 and signed with Rochester Rhinos of the USL Professional Division. He played his first game for his new team on April 15, 2011, against Richmond Kickers.

Tobin signed with NASL club Minnesota Stars FC on April 4, 2012.

He moved on to Carolina RailHawks prior to the 2014 season. He made his league debut for the club on April 12, 2014, in a 1–1 away draw with Indy Eleven. He scored his first competitive goal for the club on May 17, 2014, in a 2–0 home victory over Atlanta Silverbacks. His goal, scored in the 36th minute, made the score 2–0 to the RailHawks.

In February 2019, Tobin was signed by USL League One side Forward Madison FC ahead of their inaugural season. He made his league debut for the club on April 6, 2019, in a 1–0 defeat to Chattanooga Red Wolves SC.

== Career statistics ==
As of October 25, 2020

Team	Season	League			Playoffs		Cup		Total	
Team	Season	Division	Apps	Goals	Apps	Goals	Apps	Goals	Apps	Goals
Nybergsund IL-Trysil	2009	Norwegian First Division	19	0	–		0	0	19	0
Nybergsund IL-Trysil	2010	Norwegian First Division	0	0	–		0	0	0	0
Nybergsund IL-Trysil	Total		19	0	0	0	0	0	19	0
Rochester Rhinos	2011	USL Championship	17	1	2	0	0	0	19	1
Minnesota United	2012	North American Soccer League	11	0	1	0	1	0	13	0
Minnesota United	2013	North American Soccer League	17	1	0	0	0	0	17	1
Minnesota United	Total		28	1	1	0	1	0	30	1
North Carolina FC	2014	North American Soccer League	23	2	0	0	4	0	27	2
North Carolina FC	2015	North American Soccer League	29	2	0	0	1	0	30	2
North Carolina FC	2016	North American Soccer League	25	0	0	0	2	0	27	0
North Carolina FC	2017	North American Soccer League	31	0	1	0	2	1	34	1
North Carolina FC	2018	USL Championship	21	1	0	0	3	0	24	1
North Carolina FC	Total		129	5	1	0	12	1	132	6
Forward Madison FC	2019	USL League One	28	1	1	0	3	0	32	1
Forward Madison FC	2020	USL League One	14	0	0	0	– (Note: There was no US Open Cup played in 2020 due to the COVID-19 pandemic)		14	0
Forward Madison FC	Total		42	1	1	0	3	0	42	1
Career total			235	8	5	0	16	1	246	9
