= Nick Taitague =

American soccer player (born 1999)

Personal information
- Full name: Nicholas Matthew Taitague
- Date of birth: February 17, 1999 (age 27)
- Place of birth: Midlothian, Virginia, United States
- Height: 1.73 m (5 ft 8 in)
- Position: Midfielder

Youth career
- 2008–2016: FC Richmond
- 2017–2018: Schalke 04

Senior career*
Years	Team	Apps	(Gls)
2016	Carolina RailHawks	4	(0)
2018–2021	Schalke 04 II	13	(1)
Total		17	(1)

International career
2013–2015	United States U15	4	(1)
2015	United States U16	2	(1)
2014	United States U17	2	(1)
2015–2016	United States U18	11	(8)
2016	United States U20	2	(0)
- * Club domestic league appearances and goals as of January 2, 2021

Nicholas Matthew Taitague (born February 17, 1999) is an American former soccer player who played as a midfielder.

== Career ==
Taitague signed a short-term amateur contract with Carolina RailHawks on April 8, 2016. In February 2017, following his 18th birthday, Taitague officially signed with Schalke 04. On March 23, 2017, Taitague made his debut for Schalke's U19 team.

After playing no competitive match for the first team of Schalke, his contract with the club was terminated on January 2, 2021. On May 17, 2021, Taitague announced his retirement from professional soccer following a series of serious injuries that left him sidelined indefinitely.

== International career ==
Taitague has represented the United States at different youth levels. He also qualifies to play for Guam through his paternal grandfather.

== Career statistics ==
As of January 2, 2021

Club	Season	League			Cup		Europe		Total	
Club	Season	Division	Apps	Goals	Apps	Goals	Apps	Goals	Apps	Goals
Carolina RailHawks	2016	NASL	4	0	0	0	—		4	0
Schalke 04 II	2018–19	Oberliga Westfalen	3	1	—		—		3	1
Schalke 04 II	2019–20	Regionalliga West	5	0	—		—		5	0
Schalke 04 II	2020–21	Regionalliga West	5	0	—		—		5	0
Schalke 04 II	Total		13	1	—		—		13	1
Career total			17	1	0	0	0	0	17	1
