= Monbo Bokar =

Liberian footballer

Personal information
- Full name: Fitzpatrick Bokar
- Date of birth: June 17, 1993 (age 33)
- Place of birth: Monrovia, Liberia
- Height: 6 ft 3 in (1.91 m)
- Position: Defender

Youth career
- 2009–2011: CASL Chelsea FC
- 2011–2012: North Carolina State Wolfpack
- 2013–2014: Charlotte 49ers

Senior career*
Years	Team	Apps	(Gls)
2014–2015	Carolina Dynamo	12	(1)
2015	San Antonio Scorpions	1	(0)
- * Club domestic league appearances and goals as of October 15, 2015

Fitzpatrick "Monbo" Bokar (born June 17, 1993) is a Liberian footballer who most recently played for San Antonio Scorpions.

== Career ==
=== College ===
Bokar played college soccer initially at North Carolina State University in 2011, before transferring to UNC Charlotte in 2013.

=== Professional ===
Bokar signed with North American Soccer League side San Antonio Scorpions on June 24, 2015. The club ceased operations at the end of 2015.

== Personal life ==
Bokar and his family moved to the United States from Liberia in the mid-2000s.
