= Tyler Engel =

American soccer player

Personal information
- Date of birth: February 21, 1992 (age 34)
- Place of birth: Orland Park, Illinois, U.S.
- Height: 5 ft 8 in (1.73 m)
- Position: Forward

Youth career
- 2007–2009: Chicago Magic
- 2009–2010: Chicago Fire

College career
Years	Team	Apps	(Gls)
2010–2012	SMU Mustangs	38	(12)
2013–2014	North Carolina Tar Heels	42	(21)

Senior career*
Years	Team	Apps	(Gls)
2012–2014	Chicago Fire U-23	26	(8)
2015	Carolina RailHawks	9	(1)
2016	Tampa Bay Rowdies 2	7	(0)
- * Club domestic league appearances and goals as of June 21, 2017

Tyler Engel (born February 21, 1992) is an American retired soccer player who is a coach for the Illinois Magic youth academy.

== Career ==
=== Youth, college and amateur ===
Engel spent his youth career with the Chicago Magic Academy and the Chicago Fire Academy before signing a letter of intent to play college soccer at Southern Methodist University. After redshirting his freshman year in 2010, Engel made a total 38 appearances and tallied 12 goals and 10 assists during his time with the Mustangs. He also helped lead them to a Conference USA Tournament title in 2011.

After the 2012 season, Engel transferred to the University of North Carolina. He made a total of 42 appearances for the Tar Heels and tallied 14 goals and seven assists. He helped lead the Tar Heels to the 2014 College Cup Quarterfinals where they would fall to #2 seed UCLA on penalties.

Engel also played in the Premier Development League for Chicago Fire U-23.

=== Professional ===
On January 20, 2015, Engel was selected in the fourth round (81st overall) of the 2015 MLS SuperDraft by Toronto FC. However, he was cut from the team during preseason training camp. On May 29, Engel signed a professional contract with NASL side Carolina RailHawks. He made his professional debut on August 22 in a 3–1 defeat to the New York Cosmos.

== Honors ==
=== Southern Methodist University ===
- Conference USA Tournament Champions: 2011
