= Drew Beckie =

Canadian soccer player (born 1990)

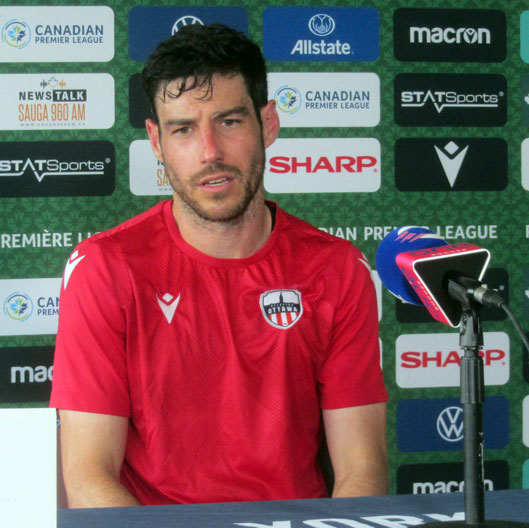
- Beckie in 2022

Personal information
- Full name: Drew D. Beckie
- Date of birth: September 30, 1990 (age 36)
- Place of birth: Regina, Saskatchewan, Canada
- Height: 1.88 m (6 ft 2 in)
- Positions: Centre-back; midfielder

Team information
- Current team: Atlético Ottawa (assistant)

Youth career
- Queen City Rangers
- Real Colorado

College career
Years	Team	Apps	(Gls)
2009–2012	Denver Pioneers	69	(7)

Senior career*
Years	Team	Apps	(Gls)
2010–2011	Real Colorado Foxes	21	(9)
2012	Ottawa Fury SC	10	(3)
2013	Columbus Crew	0	(0)
2014–2015	Ottawa Fury FC	34	(0)
2016	Carolina Railhawks	30	(0)
2017–2018	Jacksonville Armada	28	(1)
2018–2019	Oklahoma City Energy	21	(0)
2019–2020	El Paso Locomotive	21	(0)
2021–2022	Atlético Ottawa	42	(1)
Total		211	(14)

International career
2006	Canada U17	5	(0)
2008	Canada U20	2	(0)
2012	Canada U23	4	(1)

Managerial career
- 2026: Atlético Ottawa (interim)
- 2026–: Atlético Ottawa (assistant)
- * Club domestic league appearances and goals

Drew D. Beckie (born September 30, 1990) is a Canadian former professional soccer player who currently serves as an assistant coach and Head of Football Development Canadian Premier League club Atlético Ottawa.

== Early life ==
Beckie was born in Regina, Saskatchewan. When he was young, Beckie and his family moved to Denver, Colorado.

At 15, Beckie was offered a contract with the Vancouver Whitecaps Residency program. From 2005 through 2006, he trained with several German Bundesliga clubs and second Bundesliga clubs such as Eintracht Frankfurt, and 1860 Munich. Also featured in a game vs. Bayern Munich which included Franck Ribery and Thomas Muller. He initially accepted, but ultimately decided to keep his NCAA amateurism and return to Denver, later committing to the University of Denver over several other programs.

== Club career ==
=== Columbus Crew ===
Beckie was drafted 28th overall by the Columbus Crew in the 2013 MLS SuperDraft. He appeared twice on the bench (vs. Chivas USA, vs. Vancouver Whitecap FC) in the 2013 season but struggled with injury and missed 12 games. He appeared in 10 reserve games for the Crew, scoring one goal and recording an assist. He was released by the Crew in January 2014 after the appointment of Gregg Berhalter, replacing manager Robert Warzycha.

=== Ottawa Fury ===
In 2014, he signed with NASL side Ottawa Fury in their inaugural season.

=== Carolina RailHawks ===
After two seasons with the Fury, Beckie did not renew his contract with Ottawa Fury FC and was acquired by the Carolina RailHawks on December 17, 2015.

=== Jacksonville Armada ===
Beckie played for Jacksonville Armada in the 2017 season, but in November 2017 while training with KuPS FC, a Finnish First Division club, Beckie unexpectedly suffered symptoms that resulted in a sudden trip to a Swedish emergency room and subsequent hospitalization. After numerous medical tests, it was determined that he had contracted a serious virus that would require several months of recovery. Later it was found out that Beckie had suffered cardiac arrest due to a condition known as Myocarditis, a rare heart ailment that occurs when a virus attacks the heart. He recovered and returned to train with Jacksonville Armada FC while out of contract.

=== Oklahoma City Energy ===
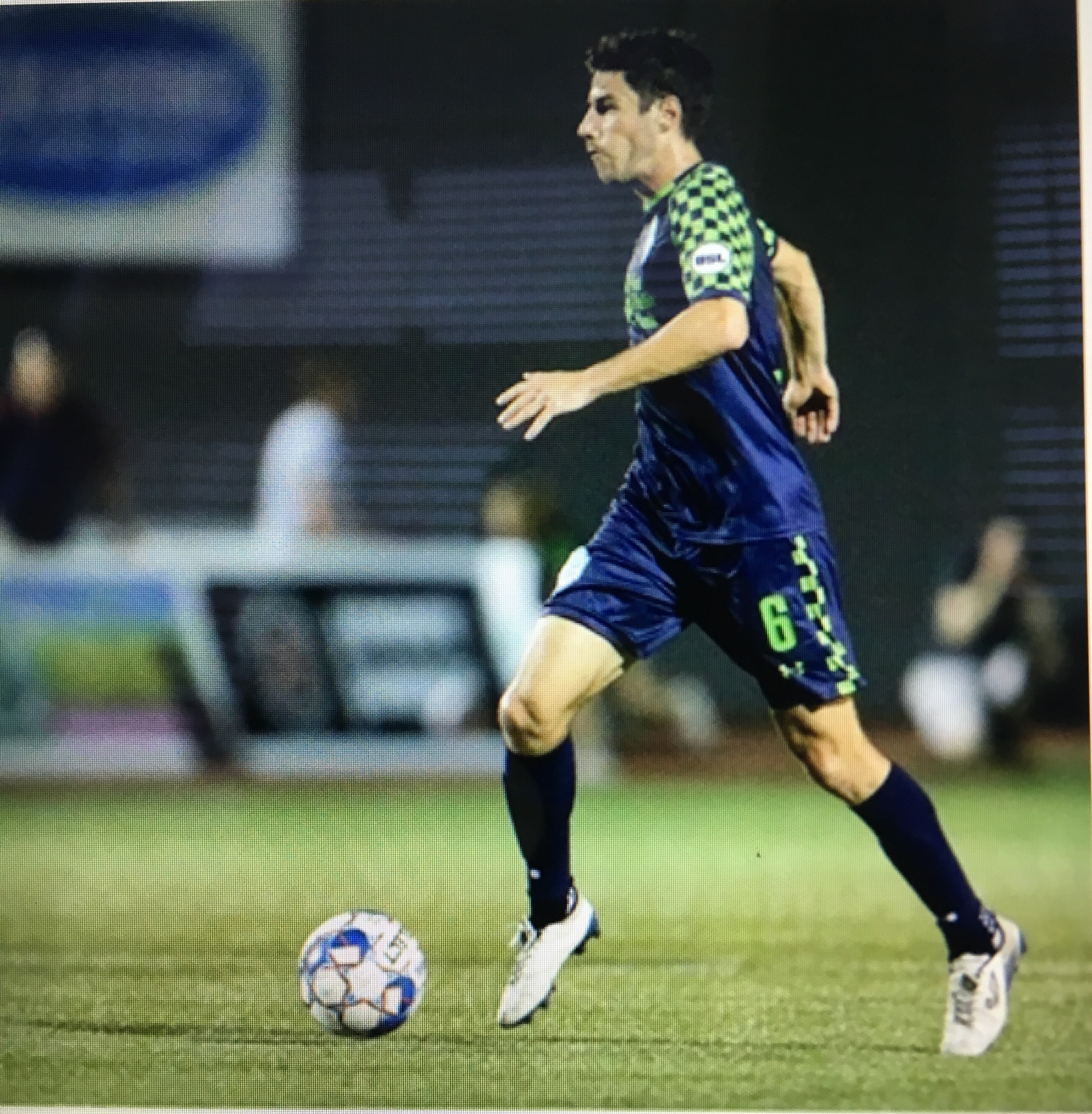
Beckie with OKC Energy in 2018

On June 7, 2018, Beckie was transferred to USL Championship side OKC Energy. That season, he made twenty appearances for the club. In 2019, Beckie made one appearance before departing in May of that year.

=== El Paso Locomotive ===
On May 21, 2019, Beckie signed with El Paso Locomotive. He made fifteen league appearances that season and another three in the playoffs. In 2020, Beckie made six appearances for El Paso in a season shortened by the COVID-19 pandemic.

=== Atlético Ottawa ===
On May 4, 2021, Beckie returned to Canada, signing with Canadian Premier League side Atlético Ottawa on a two-year deal, with an option for 2023. He made his debut on June 26 in Ottawa's season-opener, starting in central defence against FC Edmonton. During the season Beckie would battle complications from exposure to COVID-19, and missed eight games during his recovery. Upon his return to the side on September 26, Beckie started and scored the opening goal for Ottawa, his first for the club, in an eventual 3–1 victory over Cavalry FC.

On December 3, 2022, the player announced his retirement from soccer. However, on December 22, it was officially announced that he would stay at Atlético Ottawa, having been appointed to the role of Team Manager by the club.

== International career ==
Beckie attended his first Canadian U-17 camp in 2006. Beckie would attend two more camps, one in Mexico City, the other in Florida before attending the 2007 CONCACAF U17 Tournament. In 2008, Beckie attended two Canadian U-20 camps before getting injured before 2009 CONCACAF U-20 Championship. In 2012, Beckie was selected for final squad ahead of the 2012 CONCACAF Men's Olympic Qualifying Championship. Beckie appeared against El Salvador and Cuba, but missed out on the final match against Mexico due to yellow card accumulation. Beckie was called up for the Canadian senior team during his time with the Columbus Crew but could not attend due to injury and has yet to feature for the senior team.

== Managerial career ==
Beckie was hired as Atlético Ottawa's interim coach in 2026. He was later appointed as assistant coach under Gustavo Leal.

== Personal life ==
Beckie is Catholic. His younger sister Janine Beckie is also a soccer player, and has appeared for the Canadian national women's team. She currently plays for the Racing Louisville FC of the National Women's Soccer League (NWSL).

== Career statistics ==
As of match played October 30, 2022

Appearances and goals by club, season and competition
Club	Season	League			Playoffs		National Cup (Note: Includes US Open Cup and Canadian Championship)		Total	
Club	Season	Division	Apps	Goals	Apps	Goals	Apps	Goals	Apps	Goals
Real Colorado Foxes	2010	Premier Development League	9	2	—		—		9	2
Real Colorado Foxes	2011	Premier Development League	12	7	—		?	?	12	7
Real Colorado Foxes	Total		21	9	0	0	?	?	21	9
Ottawa Fury SC	2012	Premier Development League	10	3	?	?	—		10	3
Columbus Crew	2013	Major League Soccer	0	0	—		0	0	0	0
Ottawa Fury FC	2014	North American Soccer League	19	0	—		2	0	21	0
Ottawa Fury FC	2015	North American Soccer League	15	0	0	0	1	0	16	0
Ottawa Fury FC	Total		34	0	0	0	3	0	37	0
Carolina Railhawks	2016	North American Soccer League	23	0	—		2	0	25	0
Jacksonville Armada	2017	North American Soccer League	28	1	—		2	0	30	1
OKC Energy	2018	USL	20	0	—		1	0	21	0
OKC Energy	2019	USL Championship	1	0	—		1	0	2	0
OKC Energy	Total		21	0	0	0	2	0	23	0
El Paso Locomotive	2019	USL Championship	15	0	3	0	0	0	18	0
El Paso Locomotive	2020	USL Championship	6	0	0	0	—		6	0
El Paso Locomotive	Total		21	0	3	0	0	0	24	0
Atlético Ottawa	2021	Canadian Premier League	18	1	—		1	0	19	1
Atlético Ottawa	2022	Canadian Premier League	24	0	2	0	1	0	27	0
Atlético Ottawa	Total		42	1	2	0	2	0	46	1
Career total			181	14	5	0	11	0	216	14

== Honours ==
=== Atlético Ottawa ===
- Canadian Premier League
  - Regular Season: 2022
