= Jonathon Orlando =

American soccer player (born 1987)

Personal information
- Full name: Jonny Orlando
- Date of birth: August 24, 1987 (age 39)
- Place of birth: Washington, D.C., United States
- Height: 1.73 m (5 ft 8 in)
- Position: Midfielder

Youth career
- 1996–1999: Washington Soccer Club
- 1999–2001: DC United
- 2000–2005: Maryland United

College career
Years	Team	Apps	(Gls)
2005	District of Columbia Firebirds	25	(17)

Senior career*
Years	Team	Apps	(Gls)
2014	RVA FC	10	(8)
2015	Sporting Maryland	5	(10)
2016–2017	North Carolina FC	28	(2)
2017–2019	Baltimore Blast (indoor)	30	(10)

International career
2019–2021	United States futsal	5	(2)
- * Club domestic league appearances and goals

Jonathon Orlando (born August 24, 1987) is an American soccer player.

== Early life ==
Jonathon Orlando was born on August 24, 1987, and grew up in the Washington, D.C. area. His father had played professionally and with the Ghana national football team.

He enrolled at the University of the District of Columbia in 2005. In his freshman season with the District of Columbia Firebirds men's soccer team, he scored 14 goals and was the statistical leader in six different stats. However, he dropped out from UDC in 2005 and stopped playing soccer. Interviewed in 2016 about this time in his life, Orlando said, "I dropped out and started running the streets. ... I was done with soccer, and to be honest with you, I just didn’t really want to play … and I was OK with that."

After five years of not playing soccer and inconsistent employment, he joined a local church in 2010 and began to return to soccer. In 2014, he earned a spot with RVA FC, an amateur team in the National Premier Soccer League. In 2015, he played with Sporting Maryland.

== Professional career ==
Orlando signed his first professional contract with Carolina RailHawks on April 1, 2016. Orlando scored his first professional goal on June 1 during a U.S. Open Cup match against the Charlotte Independence.

Orlando played for the Baltimore Blast of Major Arena Soccer League (MASL) from 2017 to 2019. Across his two seasons, he scored 10 goals across 30 appearances.

From 2019 to 2021, he played for the United States men's national futsal team.

== Post-playing career ==
In November 2024, Orlando was hired as a program director with Washington Capital United, a nonprofit soccer organization in the Washington, D.C. area.

In November 2025, Orlando shared on Instagram that he had received his National B Coaching License from the United States Soccer Federation.
