= Jamie Dell =

Canadian soccer player (born 1993)

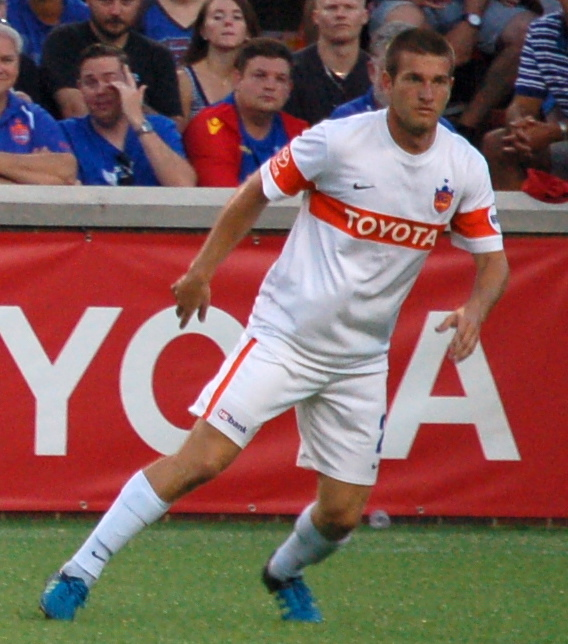
- Dell with FC Cincinnati in 2016

Personal information
- Full name: James Robert Dell
- Date of birth: August 4, 1993 (age 33)
- Place of birth: Toronto, Ontario, Canada
- Height: 1.75 m (5 ft 9 in)
- Position: Midfielder

College career
Years	Team	Apps	(Gls)
2011–2014	UNC Wilmington Seahawks		

Senior career*
Years	Team	Apps	(Gls)
2014	Forest City London	8	(1)
2015	Carolina RailHawks	4	(0)
2016	FC Cincinnati	1	(0)
2017	IFK Kumla	21	(1)
2018	Seaford Rangers FC	14	(5)
2019	Chattanooga Red Wolves	3	(0)
- * Club domestic league appearances and goals as of October 21, 2019

James Robert Dell (born August 4, 1993) is a Canadian soccer player.

== Career ==
=== Youth, college and amateur ===
Dell played four years of college soccer at the University of North Carolina at Wilmington between 2011 and 2014.

Dell also appeared for Premier Development League side Forest City London in 2014.

Dell attended high school in Chapel Hill, North Carolina and graduated from the University of North Carolina in Wilmington. His high school soccer career was spent at Chapel Hill High School, where he thrived in his senior year by scoring 24 goals and picking up 16 assists. This brought his total up to 50 goals scored and 51 assists made during his high school playing time.

Dell went on to play in 70 matches for UNC Wilmington, where he tallied 18 goals and 11 assists, with nine being game winners. Dell scored a team high 10 goals his senior year. Six of those were game winners which was tied for 3rd most in the country in 2014.

Dell was a two-time 1st team All-CAA selection (his sophomore and senior year), and his senior year he was named NSCAA 3rd team All-American. He was named Team MVP his senior year, and the winner of the UNCW Mosely Award, which recognizes the top student athlete at UNCW in all sports. His solid performances allowed him to be chosen for First-team All-CAA selection. Dell was part of the RailHawks' U-23 side for one year and has been rewarded for his hard work, talent and ability by being brought up to the RailHawks first team.

=== Professional ===
Dell signed for North American Soccer League side Carolina RailHawks on April 29, 2015.

Dell signed with FC Cincinnati of the United Soccer League on February 1, 2016.

In 2017, Dell signed for IFK Kumla in Sweden and spent the whole season there.

In 2018 he played for Seaford Rangers FC in Australia.

Dell moved back to the United States and joined USL League One side Chattanooga Red Wolves SC on March 19, 2019.
