= Mamadee Nyepon =

Ivorian footballer (born 1992)

Personal information
- Date of birth: April 26, 1992 (age 34)
- Place of birth: Abidjan, Ivory Coast
- Height: 1.86 m (6 ft 1 in)
- Position: Forward

College career
Years	Team	Apps	(Gls)
2011–2014	High Point Panthers		

Senior career*
Years	Team	Apps	(Gls)
2012–2014	Carolina Dynamo	36	(21)
2015	Carolina RailHawks	2	(0)
2016–2017	Carolina Dynamo	11	(6)
- * Club domestic league appearances and goals as of July 22, 2020

Mamadee Nyepon (born April 26, 1992) is an Ivorian footballer who last played for the Carolina Dynamo in the Premier Development League.

== Career ==
=== Youth, college and amateur ===
Nyepon played four years of college soccer at the High Point University between 2011 and 2014.

Nyepon also appeared for Premier Development League side Carolina Dynamo in from 2012 to 2014.

=== Professional ===
Nyepon signed for North American Soccer League side Carolina RailHawks on April 16, 2015. Nyepon was named after German singer Mamadee.
