= Hunter Gilstrap =

American soccer player

Personal information
- Full name: Richard Hunter Gilstrap, Jr.
- Date of birth: April 17, 1983 (age 43)
- Place of birth: Asheville, North Carolina, U.S.
- Height: 6 ft 3 in (1.91 m)
- Position: Goalkeeper

College career
Years	Team	Apps	(Gls)
2001–2004	Clemson Tigers		
2005	College of Charleston Cougars		

Senior career*
Years	Team	Apps	(Gls)
2003	Greenville Lions	6	(0)
2006	Miami FC	5	(0)
2007–2008	Cleveland City Stars	20	(0)
2008	Performance FC Phoenix		
2008–2009	Maritzburg United	11	(0)
2009	Cleveland City Stars	22	(0)
2010–2014	Pittsburgh Riverhounds	93	(0)
2015	Carolina RailHawks	9	(0)
2015	→ Charlotte Independence (loan)	2	(0)
2016	Pittsburgh Riverhounds	9	(0)
2017	Pittsburgh Riverhounds	0	(0)
Total		177+	(0+)

Managerial career
- 2012: Carnegie Mellon Tartans (goalkeeping)
- 2013: Pittsburgh Panthers (goalkeeping)
- 2017–2019: Pittsburgh Riverhounds (goalkeeping)
- * Club domestic league appearances and goals

Richard Hunter Gilstrap Jr. (born April 17, 1983) is an American retired soccer player. He played professionally in the United States and Africa. He started and operated the Pittsburgh Riverhounds Goalkeeper Academy from 2010 to 2021. He also had collegiate coaching stops at Carnegie Mellon University and the University of Pittsburgh. Gilstrap worked with US Youth National Teams in 2017. After moving on from pro coaching, he started the GK4FREE Podcast. Gilstrap then went on to start and found Pro Player Goalkeeping. Gilstrap has been married since 2015 to Kelly Gilstrap.

== Playing career ==
=== Youth and amateur ===
Gilstrap grew up in Lexington, South Carolina, attended Lexington High School, played club soccer for the NECSA (now South Carolina United FC) Galaxy, and played college soccer at Clemson University and at the College of Charleston, where he registered a 1.16 goals allowed average (GAA) and 4 shutouts during his senior season.

During his college years Gilstrap also played with the Greenville Lions in the USL Premier Development League.

=== Professional ===
Gilstrap was drafted with the 13th overall pick in the 2006 USL-1 draft by Miami FC, and spent the season playing in the USL First Division, making five first team appearances and playing in international friendlies against teams from Spain, Brazil and Guatemala.

He transferred to the expansion Cleveland City Stars in 2007, and immediately became a fan-favorite, appearing in 20 regular season games in 2 seasons with the team, and helping them to the USL Second Division championship in 2008.

After spending the 2008-09 USL offseason playing in the South African Premier Soccer League with Maritzburg United, Gilstrap re-signed with Cleveland for a third season on April 22, 2009.

Gilstrap captained the Stars in their first USL First Division campaign in 2009. Despite their last place finish, Gilstrap finished among the top 7 goalkeepers in the league in 4 statistical categories, including saves and shutouts. He was also awarded the Stars' Community Leadership Player of the Year Award for his work with the club and community during the season.

Gilstrap played the 2010 season with the Pittsburgh Riverhounds of the USL Second Division. The team finished in 3rd place after losing to the Richmond Kickers in the semifinals of the USL-2 Playoffs. Gilstrap won the 2010 USL-2 Goalkeeper of the Year Award and was voted First Team All-league for his efforts during the campaign. On February 9, 2011, Gilstrap signed a two-year contract extension with Pittsburgh. On 18 February 2013, Gilstrap signed another 2-year extension to play through with the Riverhounds through the 2014 USL Pro season.

On January 8, 2015, Gilstrap signed with the Carolina RailHawks for the 2015 season.

Gilstrap returned to Pittsburgh on January 7, 2016.

== Managerial career ==
Gilstrap served as a goalkeeping coach for several teams. In 2012, he was the goalkeeper coach for the Carnegie Mellon Tartans, serving both the men's and women's teams. In 2013, he coached in goalkeeping for the Pittsburgh Panthers men's soccer team. After retiring from his playing career, he served as goalkeeper coach for Pittsburgh Riverhounds from 2017 to 2019.
