= Álex Pérez (footballer, born 1991) =

Spanish footballer

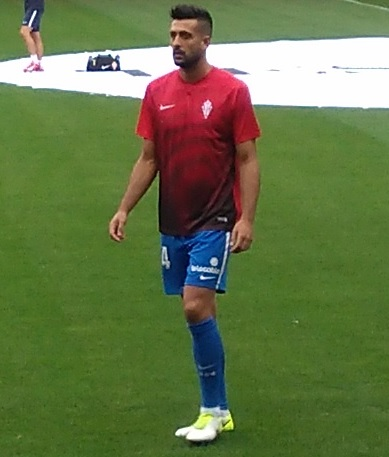
- Pérez with Sporting Gijón in 2017

Personal information
- Full name: Alejandro Pérez Navarro
- Date of birth: 11 August 1991 (age 35)
- Place of birth: Madrid, Spain
- Height: 1.91 m (6 ft 3 in)
- Position: Defender

Youth career
- 2002–2003: El Ayedo Moratalaz
- 2003–2004: La Chimenea
- 2004–2005: Juventud Madrid
- 2005–2006: Moscardó
- 2006–2010: Getafe

Senior career*
Years	Team	Apps	(Gls)
2010–2015	Getafe B	59	(1)
2010–2015	Getafe	2	(0)
2012–2013	→ Huesca (loan)	12	(0)
2013	→ Levski Sofia (loan)	13	(0)
2014	→ Recreativo (loan)	3	(0)
2015–2016	Carolina RailHawks	15	(2)
2016–2017	Valladolid	35	(1)
2017–2019	Sporting Gijón	58	(1)
2019–2020	Arminia Bielefeld	3	(0)
2020–2021	Logroñés	33	(0)
2021–2023	Lugo	9	(0)
- * Club domestic league appearances and goals as of 27 May 2023

Alejandro "Álex" Pérez Navarro (born 11 August 1991) is a Spanish professional footballer who plays as a defender.

== Club career ==
Born in Madrid, Pérez played for no fewer than five clubs as a youth, finishing his development with local Getafe CF, with whom he signed in 2006 from another team in the Community of Madrid, CD Colonia Moscardó. He made his senior debut with the reserves in the Segunda División B, only missing nine league games in the 2010–11 season as the side retained their status in their first-ever year in that tier.

Pérez made his official debut with Getafe's first team on 27 October 2010, featuring the full 90 minutes against Club Portugalete in the round of 32 in the Copa del Rey (1–1 away draw and aggregate win). On 16 December he played his first match in the UEFA Europa League, coming on as a substitute for Cata Díaz in the last minutes of the first half of a 1–0 group stage victory over BSC Young Boys.

On 20 August 2013, Pérez was loaned out to Bulgarian club PFC Levski Sofia in a season-long move. After 15 competitive appearances, he returned to Spain in the following transfer window and joined Recreativo de Huelva; he only totalled 110 minutes for the latter, and had a straight red card on his debut, a 2–3 home loss to Real Madrid Castilla on 15 March 2014.

On 24 September 2015, Pérez signed for North American Soccer League side Carolina RailHawks until the end of the campaign. He scored once in five games as his team missed out on the play-offs, his first professional goal concluding their 3–1 home win over Indy Eleven in the last matchday.

Pérez returned to Spain and its Segunda División on 12 August 2016, joining Real Valladolid. He scored his first-ever goal as a professional in his country on 27 May 2017, helping to defeat his former club Getafe 1–0 at the Estadio José Zorrilla.

In the summer of 2017, Pérez moved to Sporting de Gijón in the same league. He totalled 60 official matches over two second-division seasons, scoring in a 2–1 away loss against FC Barcelona B on 8 December 2017.

On 31 August 2019, Pérez signed a one-year contract with Arminia Bielefeld of the German 2. Bundesliga. The following 14 August, he returned to his home country after agreeing to a two-year deal with division two newcomers UD Logroñés.

On 20 August 2021, after Logroñés' relegation, Pérez joined CD Lugo also of the second tier on a one-year contract.
