= Daniel Scott (soccer) =

American soccer player

Personal information
- Full name: Daniel Scott
- Date of birth: October 16, 1985 (age 41)
- Place of birth: Haiku-Pauwela, Hawaii, United States
- Height: 6 ft 2 in (1.88 m)
- Position: Defender

College career
Years	Team	Apps	(Gls)
2003–2007	Gonzaga Bulldogs	60	(0)

Senior career*
Years	Team	Apps	(Gls)
2008	Tacoma Tide	12	(0)
2009	Seattle Wolves	13	(0)
2010–2011	Kitsap Pumas	25	(2)
2011–2013	Tampa Bay Rowdies	24	(0)
2014-2016	Carolina RailHawks	42	(1)
- * Club domestic league appearances and goals as of 2014-2016

Daniel Scott (born 1985) is a former American soccer player.

== Career ==
=== Youth and amateur ===
Scott started for four years at Gonzaga University earning All-WCC West Coast Honors his Senior season before signing with Tacoma Tide for the 2008 Premier Development League season. In 2009, he moved to Seattle Wolves of the PDL where he earned All-League and All-Western Conference first team selections. In 2009, Scott also spent time with the reserve squad for Seattle Sounders FC of Major League Soccer.

Scott stayed within the PDL in 2010 and 2011 with Kitsap Pumas. In 2011, he again earned All-League and All-Western Conference first team selections in helping lead Kitsap to the PDL Championship Title.

=== Professional ===
On August 30, 2011, Scott signed with FC Tampa Bay of the North American Soccer League. The club signed Scott to a 2012 contract, plus a club option for 2013, on November 16, 2011. He made his debut for the club on April 14, 2012, in a 1–0 win over FC Edmonton.

Scott signed with Carolina RailHawks on January 29, 2014, finishing his career in 2016 after appearing in 42 matches and scoring one goal with Carolina.

== Personal ==
Scott is the younger brother of Zach Scott, a professional soccer player with Seattle Sounders FC in Major League Soccer.
