= Gabriel da Silva =

Brazilian footballer (born 1987)

Personal information
- Full name: Gabriel Vitorio da Silva
- Date of birth: 18 September 1987 (age 39)
- Place of birth: Itanhaém, Brazil
- Height: 1.73 m (5 ft 8 in)
- Position: Right back

Youth career
- 2002–2004: Santos Ouagadougou
- 2004–2005: Coritiba

Senior career*
Years	Team	Apps	(Gls)
2005–2006	Taubaté		
2006–2007	Vitória		
2007–2008	Assisense		
2008–2013	Vysočina Jihlava	100	(4)
2013	DAC Dunajská Streda	7	(0)
2014	Grêmio Barueri	3	(0)
2014–2015	Bistra	2	(0)
2015	Carolina RailHawks	4	(0)
- * Club domestic league appearances and goals as of 23 February 2016

Gabriel Vitorio da Silva (born 18 September 1987), sometimes referred to as just Gabriel, is a Brazilian football defender.

== Club career ==
=== Vysočina Jihlava ===
In 2007, Gabriel da Silva played for Clube Atlético Assisense São Paulo for a short time. In 2008, following a successful trial, he joined Czech second division club, FC Vysočina Jihlava. He helped the club get promoted to the Czech First League in the 2011–12 season. On May 1, 2013, the Vysočina management terminated the contract with him.

=== DAC Dunajská Streda ===
Gabriel da Silva transferred to DAC in autumn 2013, from Czech FC Vysočina Jihlava. He made his debut for FK DAC 1904 Dunajská Streda in a Corgoň Liga match against MFK Košice on September 14, 2013. He played the full match of a 4–1 defeat. After playing just several matches, Gabriel da Silva left DAC.

=== Later career ===
In 2014, Gabriel da Silva joined SK Sigma Olomouc on trial, debuting for the club’s reserve team in a 1–1 draw against SK Sulko Zábřeh. On 28 August 2015, he signed for Carolina RailHawks until the end of the 2015 season. Due to several injuries, he would not be able to play any matches.
