= Ty Shipalane =

South African soccer player (born 1985)

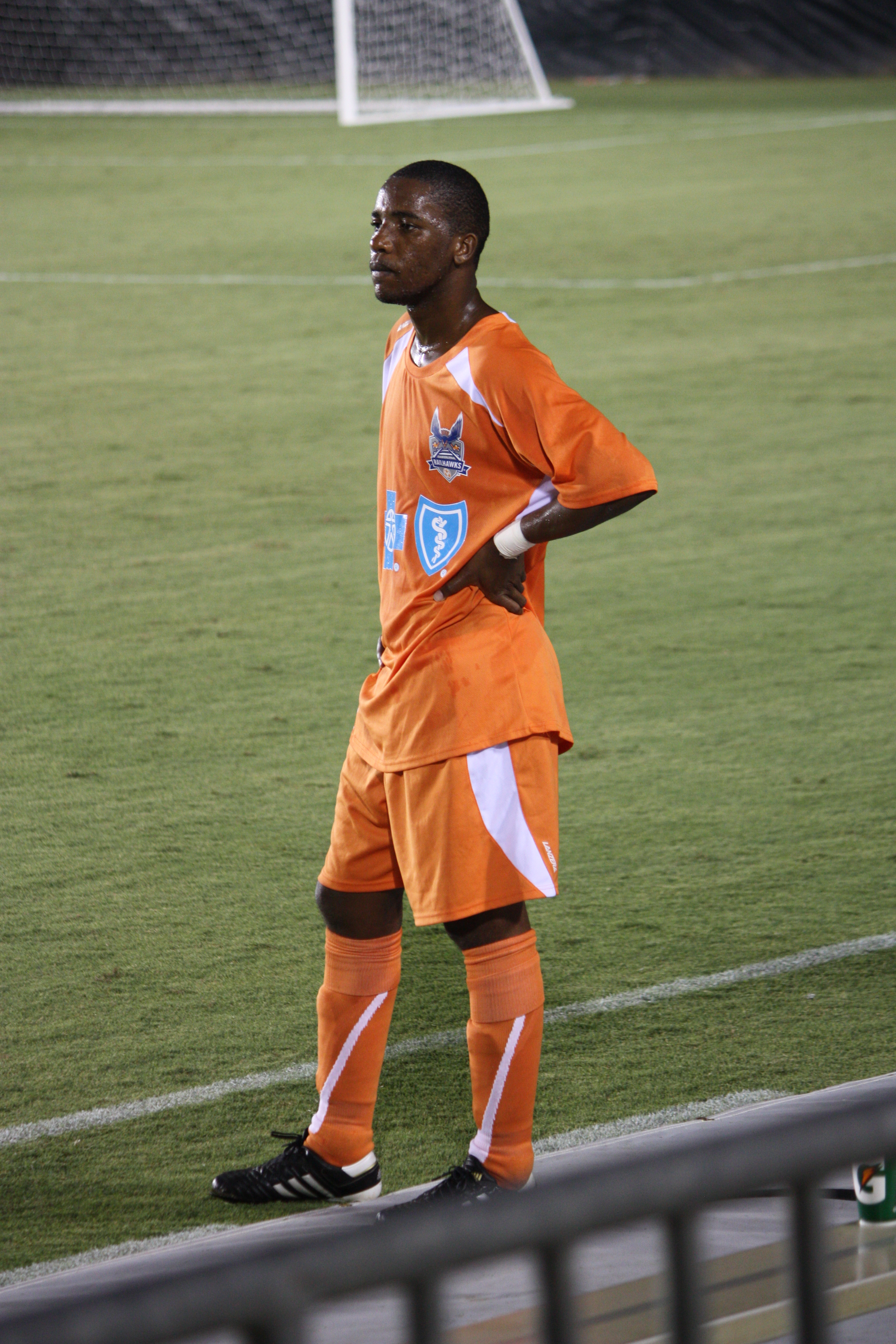

Personal information
- Full name: Tiyiselani Roun Shipalane
- Date of birth: 5 October 1985 (age 41)
- Place of birth: Tzaneen, South Africa
- Height: 5 ft 11 in (1.80 m)
- Position: Midfielder

College career
Years	Team	Apps	(Gls)
2005–2008	Lindsey Wilson Blue Raiders		

Senior career*
Years	Team	Apps	(Gls)
2006–2008	Michigan Bucks	49	(11)
2009	Harrisburg City Islanders	18	(6)
2009	→ D.C. United (loan)	0	(0)
2010	D.C. United	0	(0)
2010	→ Richmond Kickers (loan)	1	(0)
2010	Harrisburg City Islanders	2	(0)
2010	Carolina RailHawks	5	(0)
2011	University of Pretoria	?	(?)
2012–2018	North Carolina FC	180	(30)
2018–2019	Baltimore Blast (indoor)	9	(1)
2019	Wake FC	9	(1)
- * Club domestic league appearances and goals as of 22 April 2022

Tiyiselani "Ty" Shipalane (born 5 October 1985 in Tzaneen) is a South African retired footballer.

== Career ==
=== College ===
Shipalane moved from his native South Africa to the United States in 2005 to attend and play college soccer at Lindsey Wilson College, where he was the 2006 NAIA Region XI Player of the Year and a three-time All-American.

During his college years Shipalane was a member of the highly successful Michigan Bucks USL Premier Development League team. With the Bucks, Shipalane scored the winning goal in the 2006 PDL championship game, lost in the final of the 2007 PDL Championship game, and won the PDL regular season title in 2008. In total, he scored 11 goals in 49 appearances over three seasons with the team.

=== Professional ===
Shipalane trialled with Columbus Crew during the 2009 pre-season, but was not offered a contract by the team; instead, he was signed by the Harrisburg City Islanders of the USL Second Division. He made his professional debut on 18 April 2009 in Harrisburg's 2-2 opening day tie with the Richmond Kickers. He scored 6 goals in 18 appearances for the Islanders in 2009, and was named USL-2 Rookie of the Year.

On 28 August 2009, following the conclusion of the 2009 USL season, Shipalane was signed on loan by D.C. United of Major League Soccer. He made his DC United debut on 24 September in a CONCACAF Champions League game against C.D. Marathón, but never appeared for the team in league play.

He was officially added to D.C.'s permanent roster on 14 December 2009, and in doing so became the first City Islander to jump directly to MLS.

On 16 April 2010, Shipalane was loaned out to USL Second Division side Richmond Kickers, but played just one game before being released by D.C. United, simultaneously bringing to an end both his MLS tenure and his loan deal.

After a brief stint with Harrisburg City Islanders in June 2010, he signed with Carolina RailHawks in the USSF Division 2 Professional League.

Shipalane was not listed on the 2011 roster for Carolina and released on 4 April 2011. He instead played in the South African National First Division for the University of Pretoria during 2011.

Shipalane returned to the United States when he signed again for Carolina RailHawks, now playing in the North American Soccer League, in January 2012. On 29 May 2012, Shipalane played a key role as a substitute in the Railhawks' 2–1 win over the Los Angeles Galaxy in the 3rd round of the 2012 Lamar Hunt U.S. Open Cup, scoring an equalizer in the 75th minute and setting up Brian Shriver's game-winning goal in the 88th minute. Shipalane also scored two crucial stoppage-time goals for the Railhawks in 2012: one against the Tampa Bay Rowdies on 7 July that salvaged a 3–3 draw, and one against FC Edmonton on 18 August that gave the Railhawks a 3–2 victory.

In late 2018, Shipalane joined the Baltimore Blast of the Major Arena Soccer League.

== Honors ==
Michigan Bucks

- USL Premier Development League: 2006

Harrisburg City islanders

- USL Division 2 League Rookie of the year: 2009
