= Nazmi Albadawi =

Palestinian footballer

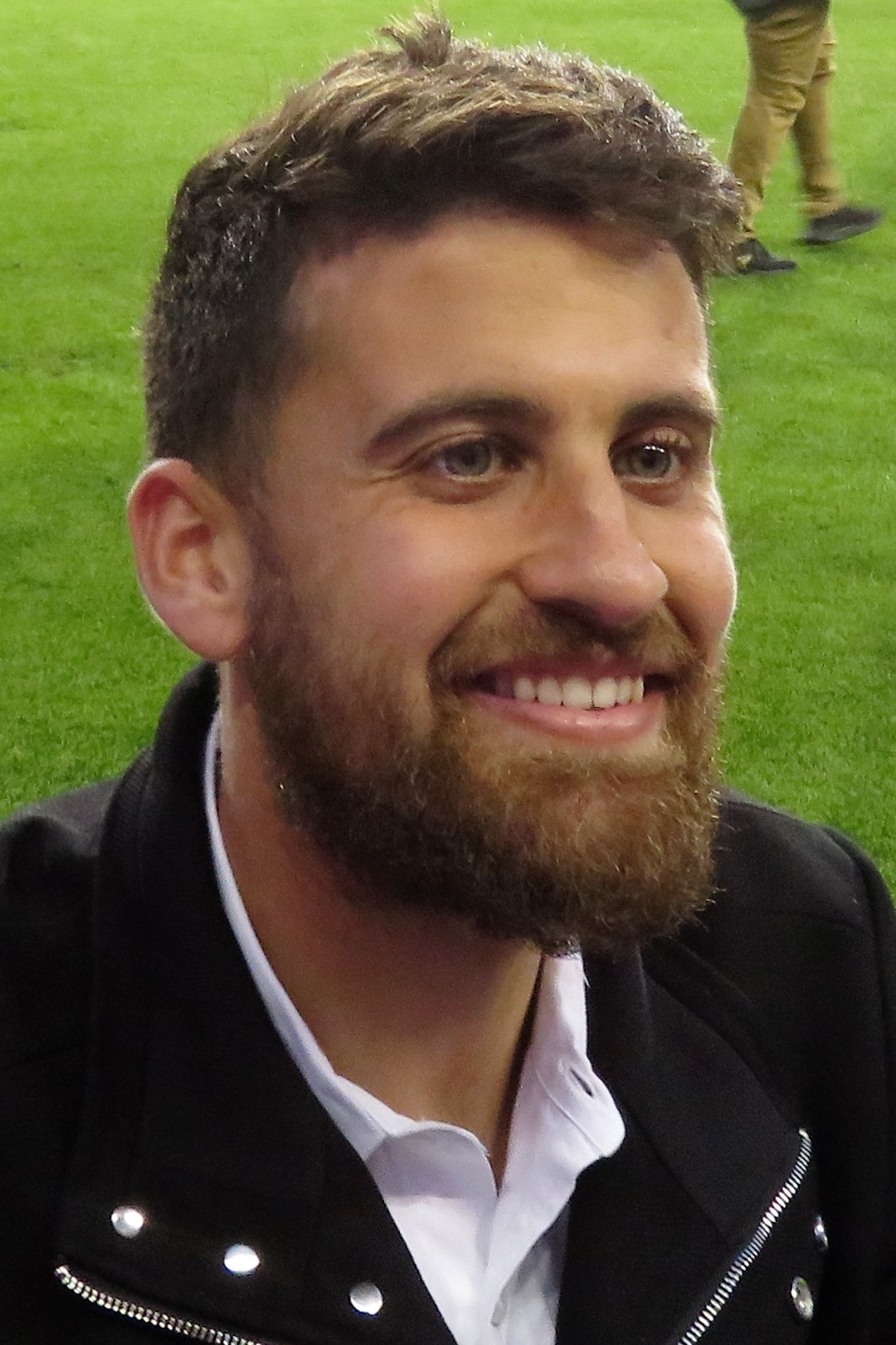
- Albadawi in 2019

Personal information
- Full name: Nazmi Nidal Nazmi Albadawi
- Date of birth: August 24, 1991 (age 35)
- Place of birth: Raleigh, North Carolina, United States
- Height: 1.80 m (5 ft 11 in)
- Position: Midfielder

Youth career
- 2008–2010: Triangle United

College career
Years	Team	Apps	(Gls)
2009	Wake Tech Eagles		
2010–2013	NC State Wolfpack	45	(17)

Senior career*
Years	Team	Apps	(Gls)
2012–2013	Carolina RailHawks U-23's	32	(12)
2014–2017	North Carolina FC	110	(17)
2018–2019	FC Cincinnati	28	(11)
2019	→ North Carolina FC (loan)	18	(3)
2020–2021	North Carolina FC	23	(2)
Total		211	(45)

International career^{‡}
2018–2019	Palestine	9	(1)
- * Club domestic league appearances and goals as of September 13, 2021 ‡ National team caps and goals as of November 14, 2019

Nazmi Nidal Nazmi Albadawi (Arabic: نظمي نضال نظمي البدوي; born August 24, 1991) is a former professional footballer who most recently played as a midfielder for North Carolina FC. Born in the United States, he played for the Palestine national team.

== Early life ==
Albadawi played club soccer for Triangle United Soccer Association.

He played high school soccer for the Athens Drive High School Jaguars of Raleigh, North Carolina. He was a four-year letter winner, winning all-conference selection three times and all-region honors as a senior. He finished his high school career with 35 goals and 60 assists in 88 games.

== College career ==
Albadawi played four years of college soccer at NC State between 2010 and 2013 and prior to that a year at Wake Technical Community College. On November 9, 2013, he scored a game-winner in overtime against in-state rivals UNC.

While at college, Albadawi appeared for NPSL club Carolina RailHawks U-23's in 2012 and 2013.

== Club career ==
=== Carolina Railhawks/North Carolina FC ===
Albadawi signed with NASL club Carolina RailHawks on April 11, 2014. On May 28, he netted his first career goal in a 2–0 win over the Charlotte Eagles in the second round of the Lamar Hunt U.S. Open Cup. On October 12, he was named NASL player of the week after scoring one goal and one assist in a win against the San Antonio Scorpions. On December 1, the RailHawks picked up his contract option for the 2015 season. On January 12, 2016, the RailHawks announced that Albadawi had been re-signed to a multi-year contract. During the 2016 season, Albadawi started 29 games for the RailHawks, scoring three goals and breaking the NASL single-season assist record with 10. Following the season, he was named to the NASL Best XI.

Prior to the 2017 NASL season, Albadawi trained with Croatian First Football League side NK Istra 1961.

=== FC Cincinnati ===
On January 15, 2018, Albadawi signed with USL side FC Cincinnati on a multi-year contract. After playing one game for Cincinnati during their inaugural MLS season in 2019, he was loaned back to North Carolina FC on May 30.

=== Return to North Carolina FC ===
On November 21, 2019, he re-signed with North Carolina FC for the 2020 season.

On September 3, 2021, Albadawi announced his retirement from professional soccer. On September 13, 2021, Albadawi was named USL League One Player of the Week for Week 23 of the 2021 season after scoring a brace against New England Revolution II in his final professional game.

== International career ==
Albadawi played his first international match for Palestine in a friendly against Pakistan that ended with a 2–1 win, scoring the winning goal.

== Personal life ==
Albadawi's family hails from Tarshiha. He is a Muslim, stating in 2019: "I've grown a lot in faith the last couple years and it's something that's been very important to me."

== Career statistics ==
=== International ===
Scores and results list Palestine's goal tally first.

No.	Date	Venue	Opponent	Score	Result	Competition
1.	November 16, 2018	Faisal Al-Husseini International Stadium, Al-Ram, Palestine	Pakistan	2–1	2–1	Friendly
