= Kupono Low =

American soccer player (born 1978)

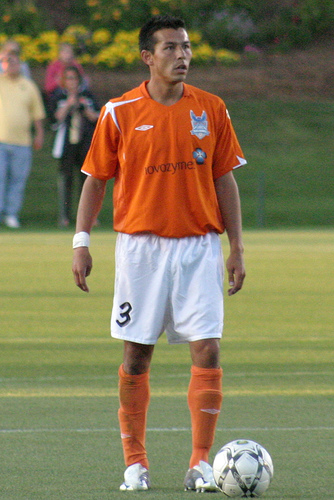

Personal information
- Date of birth: December 27, 1978 (age 47)
- Place of birth: Honolulu, Hawaii, United States
- Height: 5 ft 11 in (1.80 m)
- Position: Midfielder

College career
| Years | Team | Apps | (Gls) |
| 1999–2002 | Fresno State Bulldogs | | |

Senior career*
| Years | Team | Apps | (Gls) |
| 2000 | Central Coast Roadrunners | | |
| 2003 | California Gold | 12 | (1) |
| 2004 | Syracuse Salty Dogs | 22 | (0) |
| 2005 | Sligo Rovers | 23 | (3) |
| 2006 | Virginia Beach Mariners | 27 | (0) |
| 2007–2016 | Carolina RailHawks | 245 | (18) |

International career^{‡}
| 2008 | Puerto Rico | 3 | (1) |
- * Club domestic league appearances and goals as of March 7, 2014 ‡ National team caps and goals as of May 2, 2009

Kupono Low (born December 27, 1978) is an American former soccer player.

== Career ==
=== College and amateur ===
Low attended Irvington High School in Fremont, California, and played college soccer at California State University, Fresno from 1999 to 2002, where he was selected for the Pac-10 Men's Soccer All-Conference First Team in 2002.

In 2000, also played with the Central Coast Roadrunners in the USL Premier Development League.

=== Professional ===
Low began his professional career with the California Gold in the third division USL Pro Select League in 2003. He moved to the Syracuse Salty Dogs of the USL A-League in 2004, before signing with Irish side Sligo Rovers, whom he helped win promotion to the Premier Division. He was also a firm fan favorite at Rovers, and in recognition of his performance with the team he was named to eleven-a-side.com's Eircom FAI First Division Team of the Year for 2005.

In the spring of 2005, Low returned to the United States and joined the Virginia Beach Mariners. He played two seasons with the Mariners, but after the team suspended operations in 2007, Low signed with the Carolina RailHawks of the USL First Division, scoring the first goal in the team's history in their inaugural game. He finished the season as a second team USL-1 All Star and the team's MVP.

While still playing for Carolina, the California Cougars of Major Indoor Soccer League drafted Low in the first round (fourth overall) of the 2007 MISL Supplemental Draft; he subsequently played in four games for the Cougars in 2007–2008, during the USL off-season.

Low has remained a mainstay in Carolina since signing in 2007. Since then Low has earned All NASL Best 11 Team of the Year in 2011 and Defender of the year in 2012.

=== International ===
Despite being born in Hawaii, Low was called up to and made his debut for the Puerto Rico national football team in January 2008, in a friendly match against Bermuda. Low scored his first international goal against Trinidad and Tobago in January 2008 in Bayamon, Puerto Rico.

Low earned his three caps before the Federación Puertorriqueña de Fútbol modified its eligibility requirement. All U.S. citizens used to be eligible for Puerto Rico national teams, but now the player pool is restricted to players who have lived on the island for at least two years, meaning that Low is no longer eligible for the Puerto Rico national team per federation rules.

==== International goals ====
Scores and results list Puerto Rico's goal tally first.

| No. | Date | Venue | Opponent | Score | Result | Competition |
|---|---|---|---|---|---|---|
| 1. | January 26, 2008 | Juan Ramon Loubriel Stadium, Bayamón, Puerto Rico | Trinidad and Tobago | 1–0 | 2–2 | Friendly |
