= 2017 North Carolina FC season =

North Carolina
2017 season
- Owner: Stephen Malik
- Head coach: Colin Clarke
- Stadium: Sahlen's Stadium at WakeMed Soccer Park
- NASL: Spring: 5th Fall: 3rd Combined: 3rd
- Soccer Bowl: Championship Semi-Finals
- U.S. Open Cup: 4th Round
- Top goalscorer: League: Lance Laing (8); All: Lance Laing (9)
- Highest home attendance: 7,344 (October 21 vs. San Francisco)
- Lowest home attendance: 3,388 (September 2 vs. Edmonton)
- Average home league attendance: 4,471
- Biggest win: 5–0 (October 1 vs. Indy Eleven)
- Biggest defeat: 2 goals (April 8 vs. San Francisco) (June 17 vs. Indy Eleven)
Home colors	Away colors

The 2017 North Carolina FC season was the club's 11th season of existence, and their first season rebranded as North Carolina FC. The club was previously known as the Carolina RailHawks. North Carolina FC finished the 2017 NASL Season in 3rd place in the combined standings earning a spot in the 2017 Soccer Bowl, where they lost 1–0 to the San Francisco Deltas. After the conclusion of the season on November 16, 2017, North Carolina FC announced it would be leaving the NASL effective immediately, and would be joining the USL for the 2018 season.

== Roster ==
As of match played November 5, 2017

No.	Name	Nationality	Position	Date of birth (age)	Signed from	Signed in	Contract ends	Apps.	Goals
Goalkeepers
1	Macklin Robinson	(United States)	GK	April 2, 1994 (age 32)		2016		7	0
92	Brian Sylvestre	(United States)	GK	December 19, 1992 (age 33)	Harrisburg City Islanders	2015		52	0
98	Matias Reynares	(United States)	GK	October 25, 1998 (age 28)		2017		0	0
Defenders
2	Paul Black	(England)	DF	January 18, 1990 (age 36)	Atlanta Silverbacks	2016		53	0
4	James Marcelin	(Haiti)	DF	June 13, 1986 (age 40)	Fort Lauderdale Strikers	2016		49	3
12	Kareem Moses	(Trinidad and Tobago)	DF	February 11, 1990 (age 36)	FC Edmonton	2016		43	1
13	Connor Tobin	(United States)	DF	February 11, 1987 (age 39)	Minnesota United FC	2014		118	5
15	Christian Ibeagha	(United States)	DF	January 10, 1990 (age 36)	Colorado Springs Switchbacks	2017		32	2
22	Bradley Ruhaak	(United States)	DF	September 17, 1994 (age 32)	Michigan Bucks	2017		7	0
27	D.J. Taylor	(United States)	DF	August 26, 1997 (age 29)	CD Buñol	2017		2	0
31	Steven Miller	(United States)	DF	September 12, 1989 (age 37)	Tulsa Roughnecks	2016		42	6
Midfielders
6	Austin da Luz	(United States)	MF	October 9, 1987 (age 39)	Orlando City	2014		87	9
7	Lance Laing	(Jamaica)	MF	February 28, 1988 (age 38)	Minnesota United FC	2017		27	9
8	Saeed Robinson	(Jamaica)	MF	August 8, 1990 (age 36)	Colorado Springs Switchbacks	2017		9	0
10	Nazmi Albadawi	(United States)	MF	August 24, 1991 (age 35)	Carolina RailHawks U23	2014		121	21
11	Ty Shipalane	(South Africa)	MF	October 5, 1985 (age 41)	University of Pretoria	2012		168	33
14	Alex Molano	(United States)	MF	April 10, 1992 (age 34)	Swope Park Rangers	2017		5	0
16	Dre Fortune	(Trinidad and Tobago)	MF	July 3, 1996 (age 30)	Rochester Rhinos	2017		22	3
18	Marcel Kandziora	(Germany)	MF	February 4, 1990 (age 36)	VfL Osnabrück	2017		15	1
20	Jonathon Orlando	(United States)	MF	August 24, 1987 (age 39)	Sporting Maryland	2016		19	2
30	Bolu Akinyode	(Nigeria)	MF	May 30, 1994 (age 32)	Bethlehem Steel	2017		25	0
37	Danny Barrow	(Wales)	MF	November 16, 1995 (age 30)	Jacksonville Armada	2017		1	0
47	José Carranza	(United States)	MF	January 18, 1999 (age 27)		2017		9	2
99	Nelson Blanco	(El Salvador)	MF	August 17, 1999 (age 27)	D.C. United Academy	2017		0	0
Forwards
9	Matthew Fondy	(United States)	FW	July 28, 1989 (age 37)	Jacksonville Armada	2016		43	13
17	Billy Schuler	(United States)	FW	April 27, 1990 (age 36)	Whitecaps 2	2016		52	11
19	Jonathan Glenn	(Trinidad and Tobago)	FW	August 27, 1987 (age 39)	Jacksonville Armada	2017		7	1
26	Renan Gorne	(Brazil)	FW	February 22, 1996 (age 30)	loan from Botafogo	2017		13	6
Left during the season
21	Brian Shriver	(United States)	FW	August 5, 1987 (age 39)	Tampa Bay Rowdies	2016		26	7

== Transfers ==
=== Winter ===
Note: Flags indicate national team as has been defined under FIFA eligibility rules. Players may hold more than one non-FIFA nationality.

In: Note: Flags indicate national team as defined under FIFA eligibility rules; some limited exceptions apply. Players may hold more than one non-FIFA nationality.

No.	Pos.	Nation	Player
7	MF	JAM	Lance Laing (from (United States) Minnesota United FC)
8	MF	JAM	Saeed Robinson (from (United States) Colorado Springs Switchbacks)
14	MF	USA	Alex Molano (from (United States) Swope Park Rangers)
15	DF	USA	Christian Ibeagha (from (United States) Colorado Springs Switchbacks)
16	MF	TTO	Dre Fortune (from (United States) Rochester Rhinos)
18	MF	GER	Marcel Kandziora (from (Germany) VfL Osnabrück)
30	MF	NGR	Bolu Akinyode (from (United States) Bethlehem Steel)

Out: Note: Flags indicate national team as defined under FIFA eligibility rules; some limited exceptions apply. Players may hold more than one non-FIFA nationality.

No.	Pos.	Nation	Player
3	DF	PUR	Kupono Low
4	DF	USA	Drew Beckie (to (United States) Jacksonville Armada)
5	DF	USA	Michael Daly (to (United States) OKC Energy)
7	MF	GUA	Marvin Ceballos (to (Guatemala) Antigua GFC)
8	MF	ENG	Matt Watson (to (United States) Phoenix Rising)
9	FW	USA	Aly Hassan (to (United States) San Antonio)
23	MF	USA	Nick Taitague
24	DF	USA	Jeremy Kelly (return to (United States) North Carolina Tar Heels)
27	DF	ENG	Simon Mensing (to (Scotland) Airdrieonians)
50	GK	USA	Akira Fitzgerald (to (United States) Tampa Bay Rowdies)
99	FW	MEX	Omar Bravo (to (United States) Phoenix Rising)

=== Summer ===
In: Note: Flags indicate national team as defined under FIFA eligibility rules; some limited exceptions apply. Players may hold more than one non-FIFA nationality.

No.	Pos.	Nation	Player
19	FW	TTO	Jonathan Glenn (from (United States) Jacksonville Armada FC)
26	FW	BRA	Renan Gorne (loan from (Brazil) Botafogo)
37	MF	WAL	Danny Barrow (from (United States) Jacksonville Armada FC)
99	MF	ESA	Nelson Blanco (from (United States) D.C. United Academy)

Out: Note: Flags indicate national team as defined under FIFA eligibility rules; some limited exceptions apply. Players may hold more than one non-FIFA nationality.

No.	Pos.	Nation	Player
21	FW	USA	Brian Shriver (to (United States) Jacksonville Armada FC)

== Friendlies ==
February 18	North Carolina FC	1–1	Pittsburgh Riverhounds	Cary, North Carolina
10:30 EST	Tobin 8'		Green 87'	Stadium: WakeMed Soccer Park

March 4	North Carolina FC	1–0	Charleston Battery	Cary, North Carolina
14:00 EST				Stadium: WakeMed Soccer Park

March 8	North Carolina FC	3–0	Richmond Kickers	Cary, North Carolina
11:00 EST				Stadium: WakeMed Soccer Park

March 11	North Carolina FC	4–4	Charlotte Independence	Cary, North Carolina
19:00 EST				Stadium: WakeMed Soccer Park

March 15	Richmond Kickers	Cancelled	North Carolina FC	Richmond, Virginia
19:00 EST				Stadium: City Stadium (Richmond)

March 22	North Carolina FC (United States)	1–2	(Mexico) Club Atlas	Cary, North Carolina
19:30 EST				Stadium: WakeMed Soccer Park

July 22	North Carolina FC (United States)	0–0	(Wales) Swansea City A.F.C.	Cary, North Carolina
19:30 EST				Stadium: WakeMed Soccer Park; Attendance: 7,268

== Competitions ==
=== NASL Spring season ===
==== Standings ====
Pos	Team	Pld	W	D	L	GF	GA	GD	Pts	Qualification
1	Miami FC (S)	16	11	3	2	33	11	+22	36	Playoffs
2	San Francisco Deltas	16	7	5	4	17	20	−3	26	
3	New York Cosmos	16	6	6	4	22	21	+1	24	
4	Jacksonville Armada	16	6	6	4	17	16	+1	24	
5	North Carolina FC	16	6	3	7	21	22	−1	21	
6	Indy Eleven	16	4	8	4	21	22	−1	20	
7	FC Edmonton	16	4	1	11	11	21	−10	13	
8	Puerto Rico FC	16	1	6	9	19	28	−9	9	

Source: NASL
Rules for classification: 1) points; 2) total goal differential; 3) total goals scored; 4) head-to-head record; 5) away goal differential; 6) away goals scored
(S) Spring season champion

==== Results summary ====
Overall								Home						Away					
Pld	W	D	L	GF	GA	GD	Pts	W	D	L	GF	GA	GD	W	D	L	GF	GA	GD
16	6	3	7	21	22	−1	21	4	1	3	12	9	+3	2	2	4	9	13	−4

Last updated: July 15, 2017.
Source: Match reports

==== Results by round ====
Round	1	2	3	4	5	6	7	8	9	10	11	12	13	14	15	16
Stadium	H	A	H	A	A	H	H	A	A	H	A	A	H	H	A	H
Result	D	L	W	D	W	L	W	W	L	L	D	L	L	W	L	W
Position	3	7	4	4	3	5	4	2	3	4	5	5	5	5	5	5

Updated to match(es) played on July 15, 2017. Source: Match reports
A = Away; H = Home; W = Win; D = Draw; L = Loss

==== Matches ====
March 25, 2017 1	North Carolina FC	1–1	Miami FC	Cary
19:30 EDT	Fondy 4'; Ibeagha (yellow card) 90+2'	Report	Poku 13'; Farfán (yellow card) 18'; Freeman (yellow card) 22'; Stefano (yellow card) 45+2'; Mares (yellow card) 87'	Stadium: WakeMed Soccer Park; Attendance: 6,058; Referee: Mark Kadlecik

April 8, 2017 2	San Francisco Deltas	3–1	North Carolina FC	San Francisco
22:00 EDT	Portilla (yellow card) 21'; Reiner (yellow card) 26'; Heinemann 45+3', 90'; Dyego 82'	Report	Shipalane 23'; Sylvestre (yellow card) 35'; Albadawi (yellow card) 60'	Stadium: Kezar Stadium; Attendance: 1,739; Referee: Alejandro Mariscal

April 16, 2017 3	North Carolina FC	3–1	FC Edmonton	Cary
19:30 EDT	Laing 4'; Albadawi 23'; Fondy 48'	Report	Ameobi 71'	Stadium: WakeMed Soccer Park; Attendance: 4,293; Referee: Marcos de Oliveira

April 22, 2017 4	Miami FC	1–1	North Carolina FC	Miami
19:30 EDT	Kcira 90+5'	Report	Laing 63'; Tobin (yellow card) 81'	Stadium: Riccardo Silva Stadium; Attendance: 6,015; Referee: Rubiel Vazquez

April 29, 2017 5	Puerto Rico FC	0–1	North Carolina FC	Bayamón
19:30 EDT	Kafari (yellow card) 65'	Report	Miller 28'; Albadawi (yellow card) 47'	Stadium: Juan Ramón Loubriel Stadium; Attendance: 2,846; Referee: William Anderson

May 6, 2017 6	North Carolina FC	1–2	San Francisco Deltas	Cary
19:30 EDT	Schuler 85'	Report	Reiner 22'; Teijsse (yellow card) 83'; Jackson 87'	Stadium: WakeMed Soccer Park; Attendance: 4,525; Referee: Guido Gonzalez

May 13, 2017 7	North Carolina FC	3–1	Jacksonville Armada FC	Cary
19:30 EDT	Marcelin 27'; Laing 41', 69' (pen.)	Report	Blake 12' (pen.); Beckie (yellow card) 25'	Stadium: WakeMed Soccer Park; Attendance: 4,543; Referee: Baboucarr Jallow

May 20, 2017 8	Puerto Rico FC	1–2	North Carolina FC	Bayamón
19:30 PDT	Dawson 27'; Soria (yellow card) 55'	Report	Moses (yellow card) 51'; Fondy 73'; Miller (yellow card) 89'; Schuler 90+1'	Stadium: Juan Ramón Loubriel Stadium; Attendance: 2,367; Referee: Danion Parchment

May 28, 2017 9	Jacksonville Armada FC	2–1	North Carolina FC	Jacksonville
16:00 EDT	Steinberger 30', 32'	Report	Ibeagha (yellow card) 54'; Albadawi (yellow card) 82'; Marcelin (yellow card) 89'; Shipalane 90+3'	Stadium: Hodges Stadium; Attendance: 2,176; Referee: Geoff Gamble

June 4, 2017 10	North Carolina FC	0–1	New York Cosmos	Cary
16:00 EDT		Report	Guerra 52'; Szetela (yellow card) 75'; Holt (yellow card) 80'; Flores (yellow card) 90+1'	Stadium: WakeMed Soccer Park; Attendance: 4,027; Referee: Younes Marrakchi

June 10, 2017 11	New York Cosmos	2–2	North Carolina FC	Brooklyn
16:00 EDT	Herrera 7'; Mendes (yellow card) 30'; Alhassan 84'	Report	Schuler 11'; Laing 45'; Ibeagha (yellow card) 90+4'	Stadium: MCU Park; Attendance: 4,285; Referee: Rubiel Vazquez

June 17, 2017 12	Indy Eleven	2–0	North Carolina FC	Indianapolis
19:30 EDT	Braun 60'; Smart (yellow card) 77'; Speas 84'; Ring (yellow card) 90+1'	Report		Stadium: Michael Carroll Stadium; Attendance: 8,092; Referee: Geoff Gamble

June 24, 2017 13	North Carolina FC	1–2	Indy Eleven	Cary
19:30 EDT	Shipalane 9'; Ibeagha (yellow card) 29'; Moses (yellow card) 56'	Report	Braun 21'; Zayed 23'; Smart (yellow card) 45+1'; Busch (yellow card) 87'	Stadium: WakeMed Soccer Park; Attendance: 3,494; Referee: Jon Freemon

July 4, 2017 14	North Carolina FC	1–0	Miami FC	Cary
19:30 EDT	Marcelin (yellow card) 34'; Schuler 65'	Report	Rezende (yellow card) 50'; Lahoud (yellow card) 67'	Stadium: WakeMed Soccer Park; Attendance: 4,236; Referee: Alex Chilowicz

July 7, 2017 15	FC Edmonton	2–1	North Carolina FC	Edmonton
21:00 EDT	Diakité (yellow card) 30'; Watson (yellow card) 32'; Ameobi 77'; Eustáquio 80'	Report	Fortune 24'; J.Carranza (yellow card) 86'	Stadium: Clarke Stadium; Attendance: 3,438; Referee: Yusri Rudolf

July 15, 2017 16	North Carolina FC	2–1	Puerto Rico FC	Cary
19:30 EDT	Laing 17'; Miller (yellow card) 71'; J.Carranza (yellow card) 83'; Fondy 90+2' (pen.)	Report	Welshman (yellow card) 31'; Cristiano (yellow card) 65'; Kavita 84'; Spangenberg (yellow card) 90+2'	Stadium: WakeMed Soccer Park; Attendance: 4.227; Referee: Nima Saghafi

=== NASL Fall season ===
==== Standings ====
Pos	Team	Pld	W	D	L	GF	GA	GD	Pts	Qualification
1	Miami FC (F)	16	10	3	3	28	17	+11	33	Playoffs
2	San Francisco Deltas	16	7	7	2	24	15	+9	28	
3	North Carolina FC	16	5	9	2	25	15	+10	24	
4	New York Cosmos	16	4	9	3	34	30	+4	21	
5	Jacksonville Armada	16	4	7	5	21	22	−1	19	
6	Puerto Rico FC	16	4	4	8	13	23	−10	16	
7	FC Edmonton	16	3	5	8	14	21	−7	14	
8	Indy Eleven	16	3	4	9	18	34	−16	13	

Source: NASL
Rules for classification: 1) points; 2) total goal differential; 3) total goals scored; 4) head-to-head record; 5) away goal differential; 6) away goals scored
(F) Fall season champion

==== Results summary ====
Overall								Home						Away					
Pld	W	D	L	GF	GA	GD	Pts	W	D	L	GF	GA	GD	W	D	L	GF	GA	GD
16	5	9	2	25	15	+10	24	1	6	1	12	8	+4	4	3	1	13	7	+6

Last updated: October 29, 2017.
Source: Match reports

==== Results by round ====
Round	1	2	3	4	5	6	7	8	9	10	11	12	13	14	15	16
Stadium	H	A	H	H	A	H	H	A	A	H	A	H	A	A	H	A
Result	D	W	D	L	D	D	D	W	L	D	W	W	W	D	D	D
Position	3	1	1	4	4	4	5	2	2	2	2	2	2	3	3	3

Updated to match(es) played on October 29, 2017. Source: Match reports
A = Away; H = Home; W = Win; D = Draw; L = Loss

==== Matches ====
July 29, 2017 1	North Carolina FC	1–1	Puerto Rico FC	Cary
19:30 EDT	da Luz (yellow card) 4'; Fondy 90+1' (pen.)	Report	Quintillà 13' (yellow card) 34'; Ramírez (yellow card) 48'; Spangenberg (yellow card) 72'; Kafari (yellow card) 84'; Puerto (yellow card) 90'	Stadium: Sahlen's Stadium at WakeMed Soccer Park; Attendance: 4,166; Referee: Timothy Ford

August 5, 2017 2	Miami FC	2–3	North Carolina FC	Miami
19:30 EDT	Pereira 89' (pen.); Pinho 90+2'	Report	Glenn 27'; Ibeagha (yellow card) 42' (goal) 90+4'; Kandziora 70'; Miller (yellow card) 84'	Stadium: Riccardo Silva Stadium; Attendance: 5,022; Referee: Joseph Dickerson

August 12, 2017 3	North Carolina FC	2–2	Jacksonville Armada FC	Cary
19:30 EDT	Fortune (yellow card) 26' (goal) 44'; Laing 69'	Report	Taylor 3'; Blake 18' (pen.) (yellow card) 90'; George (yellow card) 28'	Stadium: Sahlen's Stadium at WakeMed Soccer Park; Attendance: 4,272; Referee: Ramy Touchan

August 15, 2017 4	North Carolina FC	0–1	Miami FC	Cary
19:30 EDT	Carranza (yellow card) 43'	Report	Chavez 15' (yellow card) 75'; Lahoud (yellow card) 47'	Stadium: Sahlen's Stadium at WakeMed Soccer Park; Attendance: 3,525; Referee: Guido Gonzalez

August 19, 2017 5	San Francisco Deltas	1–1	North Carolina FC	San Francisco
17:00 PDT	Hopkins 60'; Dagoberto (yellow card) 71'	Report	Sylvestre (yellow card) 25'; Laing 71' (pen.) da Luz (yellow card) 85'	Stadium: Kezar Stadium; Attendance: 2,094; Referee: Victor Rivas

August 26, 2017 6	North Carolina FC	2–2	New York Cosmos	Cary
19:30 EDT	Albadawi (yellow card) 45' (goal) 46'; Molano (yellow card) 86'; Gorne 90'	Report	Vranjicán (yellow card) 19'; Flores 59'; Starikov 71'; Szetela (yellow card) 90+1'; Richter (yellow card) 90+6'	Stadium: Sahlen's Stadium at WakeMed Soccer Park; Attendance: 4,205; Referee: Bardhyl Pashaj

September 2, 2017 7	North Carolina FC	1–1	FC Edmonton	Cary
19:30 EDT	Ibeagha 4'	Report	Sylvestre 70' (o.g.)	Stadium: Sahlen's Stadium at WakeMed Soccer Park; Attendance: 3,388; Referee: Marcos de Oliveira

September 10, 2017 8	FC Edmonton	0–3	North Carolina FC	Edmonton
14:00 MDT	Nicklaw (yellow card) 59'; Fisk (yellow card) 66'	Report	Albadawi 12'; Gorne 21'; Miller 87'	Stadium: Clarke Stadium; Attendance: 3,549; Referee: Juan Marquez

September 13, 2017 9	Indy Eleven	1–0	North Carolina FC	Indianapolis
19:00 EDT	Torrado (yellow card) 32'; Zayed 90+1'	Report	Marcelin (red card) 40'; Tobin (yellow card) 80'	Stadium: Michael Carroll Stadium; Attendance: 7,798; Referee: Geoff Gamble

September 16, 2017 10	North Carolina FC	0–0	Puerto Rico FC	Cary
19:30 EDT	Shipalane (yellow card) 23'	Report	Martínez (yellow card) 59'; Moses (yellow card) 72'	Stadium: Sahlen's Stadium at WakeMed Soccer Park; Attendance: 5,027; Referee: Juan Guzmán

September 23, 2017 11	New York Cosmos	0–2	North Carolina FC	Brooklyn
19:00 EDT	Mendes (yellow card) 37'; Jakovic (yellow card) 89'	Report	Gorne 12'; Albadawi (yellow card) 35' da Luz 45+3'	Stadium: MCU Park; Attendance: 4,666; Referee: Joe Dickerson

October 1, 2017 12	North Carolina FC	5–0	Indy Eleven	Cary
16:00 EDT	Gorne 9', 45+1' (pen.); Albadawi 32'; Miller 35'; Fortune 90'	Report		Stadium: Sahlen's Stadium at WakeMed Soccer Park; Attendance: 4,209; Referee: Alex Chilowicz

October 7, 2017 13	Puerto Rico FC	0–1	North Carolina FC	Cary
19:30 EDT	Quintillà (yellow card) 53'; Kavita (yellow card) 63'	Report	Miller 23'; Kandziora (yellow card) 84'	Stadium: Sahlen's Stadium at WakeMed Soccer Park; Referee: Bardhyl Pashaj
Note: Match was originally scheduled to be played at Juan Ramón Loubriel Stadium in Bayamón but was moved due to destruction caused by Hurricane Maria.

October 13, 2017 14	Jacksonville Armada FC	1–1	North Carolina FC	Jacksonville
19:30 EDT	Black (yellow card) 23'; Gorne 36'	Report	Steinberger 21'; Ryden (yellow card) 75'	Stadium: Hodges Stadium; Attendance: 4,967; Referee: Michael Radchuck

October 21, 2017 15	North Carolina FC	1–1	San Francisco Deltas	Cary
19:30 EDT	Marcelin (yellow card) 5' da Luz 30'; Gorne (yellow card) 59'	Report	Dyego 68'	Stadium: Sahlen's Stadium at WakeMed Soccer Park; Attendance: 7,344; Referee: Caleb Mendez

October 29, 2017 16	Indy Eleven	2–2	North Carolina FC	Indianapolis
17:00 EDT	Zayed 20'; Cory Miller 65'; Goldsmith (yellow card) 88'	Report	Schuler 4', 89'; Barrow (yellow card) 19'	Stadium: Michael Carroll Stadium; Attendance: 8,813; Referee: Mark Kadlecik

=== The Championship ===
==== Bracket ====
Semi-Finals
November 5 – Riccardo Silva Stadium
#1 Miami FC	0(5)
#4 New York Cosmos (pen.)	0(6)
November 5 – Kezar Stadium
#2 San Francisco Deltas	1
#3 North Carolina FC	0

Championship
November 12 – Kezar Stadium
#2 San Francisco Deltas	2
#4 New York Cosmos	0

==== Results ====
November 5, 2017 Semi-Final	San Francisco Deltas(2)	1–0	(3)North Carolina FC	San Francisco
20:00 EDT	Gibson 40'; Jordan (yellow card) 60'; Bekker (yellow card) 90'	Report		Stadium: Kezar Stadium; Attendance: 3,586; Referee: Alex Chilowicz

=== U.S. Open Cup ===
May 17, 2017 Second Round	Carolina Dynamo	1–6	North Carolina FC	Greensboro
19:00 EDT	Shear 74'	Report	Shriver 27'; Fondy 37'; Shipalane 40'; Fortune (yellow card) 45+2'; Schuler 47', 85'; Orlando 57'	Stadium: Macpherson Stadium; Attendance: 300; Referee: Dustin Thorne

May 31, 2017 Third Round	North Carolina FC	4–1	Charlotte Independence	Cary
19:30 EDT	Marcelin 17'; Laing (yellow card) 45+1'; Albadawi 51', 82'; Sylvestre (yellow card) 63'; Tobin 83'	Report	E.Martínez (yellow card) 24'; Kalungi (yellow card) 45'; A.Martínez 90+2' (pen.) (yellow card) 90+5'	Stadium: WakeMed Soccer Park; Attendance: 2,052; Referee: Kevin Broadley

June 14, 2017 Fourth Round	North Carolina FC	2–3 (a.e.t.)	Houston Dynamo	Cary
19:30 EDT	Miller 4' da Luz (yellow card) 43'; Laing 69'	Report	Wenger 25' (yellow card) 87'; Remick 62'; Bird (yellow card) 66'; Luna (yellow card) 101'; Rodriguez 109'	Stadium: WakeMed Soccer Park; Attendance: 4,325; Referee: Mark Kadlecik

== Squad statistics ==
As of Match played November 5, 2017

=== Appearances and goals ===
No.	Pos	Nat	Player	Total		NASL Spring Season		NASL Fall Season		NASL Playoff		U.S. Open Cup	
No.	Pos	Nat	Player	Apps	Goals	Apps	Goals	Apps	Goals	Apps	Goals	Apps	Goals
1	GK	(United States) USA	Macklin Robinson	7	0	0	0	3+2	0	1	0	1	0
2	DF	(England) ENG	Paul Black	30	0	11+1	0	16	0	1	0	1	0
4	DF	(Haiti) HAI	James Marcelin	28	2	12+1	1	9+3	0	1	0	1+1	1
6	MF	(United States) USA	Austin da Luz	29	2	14	0	12	2	1	0	2	0
7	MF	(Jamaica) JAM	Lance Laing	27	9	13+1	6	7+3	2	0+1	0	2	1
8	MF	(Jamaica) JAM	Saeed Robinson	9	0	4+3	0	0	0	0	0	2	0
9	FW	(United States) USA	Matthew Fondy	23	6	13+2	4	2+3	1	0	0	2+1	1
10	MF	(United States) USA	Nazmi Albadawi	36	6	16	1	15+1	3	1	0	2+1	2
11	MF	(South Africa) RSA	Ty Shipalane	24	4	8+3	3	5+4	0	0+1	0	2+1	1
12	DF	(Trinidad and Tobago) TTO	Kareem Moses	20	0	6+4	0	7+2	0	0	0	1	0
13	DF	(United States) USA	Connor Tobin	34	1	15	0	16	0	1	0	2	1
14	MF	(United States) USA	Alex Molano	5	0	0+1	0	0+4	0	0	0	0	0
15	DF	(United States) USA	Christian Ibeagha	32	2	16	0	12	2	1	0	3	0
16	MF	(Trinidad and Tobago) TTO	Dre Fortune	22	3	1+4	1	13+1	2	1	0	1+1	0
17	FW	(United States) USA	Billy Schuler	20	8	5+6	4	2+4	2	1	0	1+1	2
18	MF	(Germany) GER	Marcel Kandziora	15	1	0+2	0	8+3	1	1	0	1	0
19	FW	(Trinidad and Tobago) TTO	Jonathan Glenn	7	1	0	0	1+5	1	0+1	0	0	0
20	MF	(United States) USA	Jonathon Orlando	6	1	1+3	0	0+1	0	0	0	1	1
22	DF	(United States) USA	Bradley Ruhaak	7	0	4	0	0+1	0	0	0	1+1	0
26	FW	(Brazil) BRA	Renan Gorne	13	6	0	0	11+1	6	1	0	0	0
27	DF	(United States) USA	D.J. Taylor	2	0	0	0	2	0	0	0	0	0
30	MF	(Nigeria) NGR	Bolu Akinyode	25	0	5+7	0	3+7	0	0	0	2+1	0
31	DF	(United States) USA	Steven Miller	27	5	11	1	14	3	0	0	2	1
37	MF	(Wales) WAL	Danny Barrow	1	0	0	0	1	0	0	0	0	0
47	MF	(United States) USA	Jose Carranza	9	2	2+3	2	3+1	0	0	0	0	0
92	GK	(United States) USA	Brian Sylvestre	31	0	16	0	13	0	0	0	2	0
Players away on loan:
Players who left North Carolina during the season:
21	FW	(United States) USA	Brian Shriver	11	1	3+6	0	0	0	0	0	1+1	1

=== Goal scorers ===
Place	Position	Nation	Number	Name	NASL Spring Season	NASL Fall Season	NASL Playoff	U.S. Open Cup	Total
1	MF	(Jamaica)	7	Lance Laing	6	2	0	1	9
2	FW	(United States)	17	Billy Schuler	4	2	0	2	8
3	FW	(United States)	9	Matthew Fondy	4	1	0	1	6
3	MF	(United States)	10	Nazmi Albadawi	1	3	0	2	6
3	FW	(Brazil)	19	Renan Gorne	0	6	0	0	6
6	DF	(United States)	31	Steven Miller	1	3	0	1	5
7	MF	(South Africa)	11	Ty Shipalane	3	0	0	1	4
8	MF	(Trinidad and Tobago)	16	Dre Fortune	1	2	0	0	3
9	MF	(United States)	47	Jose Carranza	2	0	0	0	2
9	MF	(United States)	6	Austin da Luz	0	2	0	0	2
9	DF	(Nigeria)	15	Christian Ibeagha	0	2	0	0	2
9	DF	(Haiti)	4	James Marcelin	1	0	0	1	2
13	FW	(Trinidad and Tobago)	26	Jonathan Glenn	0	1	0	0	1
13	MF	(Germany)	18	Marcel Kandziora	0	1	0	0	1
13	MF	(United States)	20	Jonathon Orlando	0	0	0	1	1
13	FW	(United States)	21	Brian Shriver	0	0	0	1	1
13	DF	(United States)	13	Connor Tobin	0	0	0	1	1
TOTALS					21	24	0	12	57

=== Disciplinary record ===
Number	Nation	Position	Name	NASL Spring Season		NASL Fall Season		NASL Playoff		U.S. Open Cup		Total	
Number	Nation	Position	Name	Yellow card	Red card	Yellow card	Red card	Yellow card	Red card	Yellow card	Red card	Yellow card	Red card
2	(England)	DF	Paul Black	0	0	1	0	0	0	0	0	1	0
4	(Haiti)	DF	James Marcelin	2	0	1	1	0	0	0	0	3	1
6	(United States)	MF	Austin da Luz	0	0	2	0	0	0	1	0	3	0
7	(Jamaica)	MF	Lance Laing	0	0	0	0	0	0	1	0	1	0
10	(United States)	MF	Nazmi Albadawi	3	0	2	0	0	0	0	0	5	0
11	(South Africa)	MF	Ty Shipalane	0	0	1	0	0	0	0	0	1	0
12	(United States)	DF	Kareem Moses	2	0	1	0	0	0	0	0	3	0
13	(United States)	DF	Connor Tobin	1	0	0	0	0	0	0	0	1	0
14	(United States)	MF	Alex Molano	0	0	1	0	0	0	0	0	1	0
15	(United States)	DF	Christian Ibeagha	4	0	1	0	0	0	0	0	5	0
16	(Trinidad and Tobago)	MF	Dre Fortune	0	0	1	0	0	0	1	0	2	0
18	(Germany)	MF	Marcel Kandziora	0	0	1	0	0	0	0	0	1	0
26	(Brazil)	FW	Renan Gorne	0	0	1	0	0	0	0	0	1	0
31	(United States)	DF	Steven Miller	2	0	1	0	0	0	0	0	3	0
37	(Wales)	MF	Danny Barrow	0	0	1	0	0	0	0	0	1	0
47	(United States)	MF	José Carranza	2	0	1	0	0	0	0	0	2	0
92	(United States)	GK	Brian Sylvestre	1	0	1	0	0	0	1	0	3	0
			TOTALS	17	0	17	1	0	0	4	0	38	1
