= 2017 Jacksonville Armada FC season =

Jacksonville Armada
2017 season
- Owner: Mark Frisch
- Head coach: Mark Lowry
- Stadium: Hodges Stadium
- NASL: Spring: 4th Fall: 5th Overall: 5th
- U.S. Open Cup: Fourth round
Home colors	Away colors

The 2017 Jacksonville Armada FC season was the club's third season of existence. The club played in North American Soccer League, the second tier of the American soccer pyramid.

== Roster ==
As of match played October 18, 2017

No.	Name	Nationality	Position	Date of birth (age)	Signed from	Signed in	Contract ends	Apps.	Goals
Goalkeepers
1	Caleb Patterson-Sewell	(United States)	GK	May 20, 1987 (aged 30)	Farense	2017		32	0
13	Kyle Nasta	(United States)	GK	December 28, 1993 (aged 23)		2016		3	0
Defenders
2	Drew Beckie	(Canada)	DF	May 20, 1987 (aged 30)	Carolina RailHawks	2017		30	1
3	Peabo Doue	(United States)	DF	December 28, 1991 (aged 25)	Wilmington Hammerheads	2017		4	0
4	Mechack Jérôme	(Haiti)	DF	April 21, 1990 (aged 27)	Charlotte Independence	2015		65	2
5	Aaron Pitchkolan	(United States)	DF	March 14, 1983 (aged 34)	Minnesota United	2017		33	1
12	Devon Fisher	(United States)	DF	October 22, 1993 (aged 24)	Seattle Sounders 2	2017		7	0
15	Michael O'Sullivan	(United States)	DF	February 18, 1995 (aged 22)	Palm Beach Atlantic University	2017		2	0
22	Kalen Ryden	(United States)	DF	April 12, 1991 (aged 26)	OKC Energy	2017		32	1
Midfielders
6	Nicklas Maripuu	(Sweden)	MF	March 2, 1992 (aged 25)	IK Sirius	2016		31	0
8	Jack Blake	(Scotland)	MF	September 22, 1994 (aged 23)	Minnesota United	2017		29	10
19	Kevan George	(Trinidad and Tobago)	MF	January 30, 1990 (aged 27)	Columbus Crew	2016		57	0
23	Zach Steinberger	(United States)	MF	May 10, 1992 (aged 25)	Houston Dynamo	2017		53	12
25	Bryam Rebellón	(Colombia)	MF	January 22, 1992 (aged 25)	LA Galaxy II	2017		23	0
Forwards
7	Tony Taylor	(Panama)	FW	July 13, 1989 (aged 28)	Paços de Ferreira	2017		12	3
9	Ciarán Kilduff	(Republic of Ireland)	FW	September 29, 1988 (aged 29)	Dundalk	2017		12	4
10	J. C. Banks	(United States)	FW	August 24, 1989 (aged 28)	Minnesota United	2017		34	5
11	Jemal Johnson	(United States)	FW	May 3, 1985 (aged 32)	New York Cosmos	2015		76	7
17	Brian Shriver	(United States)	FW	August 5, 1987 (aged 30)	North Carolina	2017		11	0
27	Derek Gebhard	(United States)	FW	October 15, 1995 (aged 22)	Jacksonville United	2015		51	4
99	Charles Eloundou	(Cameroon)	FW	December 4, 1994 (aged 22)	Colorado Rapids	2016		53	7
Left during the season
7	Danny Barrow	(Wales)	MF	November 16, 1995 (aged 21)	Truro City	2016		19	0
9	Jonathan Glenn	(Trinidad and Tobago)	FW	August 27, 1987 (aged 30)	IBV	2017		15	1

== Transfers ==
=== Winter ===
In: Note: Flags indicate national team as defined under FIFA eligibility rules; some limited exceptions apply. Players may hold more than one non-FIFA nationality.

No.	Pos.	Nation	Player
1	GK	USA	Caleb Patterson-Sewell (from (Portugal) Farense)
2	DF	CAN	Drew Beckie (from (United States) Carolina RailHawks)
3	DF	USA	Peabo Doue (from (United States) Wilmington Hammerheads)
5	DF	USA	Aaron Pitchkolan (from (United States) Minnesota United)
8	MF	SCO	Jack Blake (from (United States) Minnesota United)
9	FW	TTO	Jonathan Glenn (from (Iceland) IBV)
10	FW	USA	J. C. Banks (from (United States) Minnesota United)
12	DF	USA	Devon Fisher (from (United States) Seattle Sounders 2)
15	DF	USA	Michael O'Sullivan (from (United States) Palm Beach Atlantic University)
22	DF	USA	Kalen Ryden (from (United States) OKC Energy)
23	MF	USA	Zach Steinberger (from (United States) Houston Dynamo, previously on loan)
25	MF	COL	Bryam Rebellón (from (United States) LA Galaxy II)

Out: Note: Flags indicate national team as defined under FIFA eligibility rules; some limited exceptions apply. Players may hold more than one non-FIFA nationality.

No.	Pos.	Nation	Player
1	GK	MEX	Miguel Gallardo
2	DF	USA	Tyler Ruthven (to (United States) Miami)
3	MF	USA	Anthony Wallace (to (United States) OKC Energy)
5	DF	USA	Beto Navarro (to (United States) Orange County)
7	DF	USA	Bryan Burke (to (United States) San Francisco Deltas)
8	MF	FIN	Pekka Lagerblom (to (Sweden) Åtvidaberg)
9	FW	SWE	Alexander Andersson (to (Sweden) Degerfors)
10	FW	GUI	Alhassane Keita
13	DF	USA	Matt Bahner (to (United States) Cincinnati)
16	MF	ARG	Lucas Scaglia
17	MF	COL	Nicolás Perea
18	MF	GER	Jason Plumhoff (to (United States) Indy Eleven)
21	MF	USA	Alex Dixon (to (United States) OKC Energy)
23	GK	USA	Sean Lewis (to (United States) Harrisburg City Islanders)
24	FW	CAN	Chaim Roserie
29	DF	NED	Patrick Otte
33	MF	USA	Garry Lewis
52	DF	CAN	Karl Ouimette (loan return to (United States) New York Red Bulls)

=== Summer ===
In: Note: Flags indicate national team as defined under FIFA eligibility rules; some limited exceptions apply. Players may hold more than one non-FIFA nationality.

No.	Pos.	Nation	Player
7	FW	PAN	Tony Taylor (from (Portugal) Paços de Ferreira)
9	FW	IRL	Ciarán Kilduff (from (Republic of Ireland) Dundalk)
17	FW	USA	Brian Shriver (from (United States) North Carolina)

Out: Note: Flags indicate national team as defined under FIFA eligibility rules; some limited exceptions apply. Players may hold more than one non-FIFA nationality.

No.	Pos.	Nation	Player
7	MF	WAL	Danny Barrow (to (United States) North Carolina)
9	FW	TTO	Jonathan Glenn (to (United States) North Carolina)

== Competitions ==
=== NASL Spring season ===
==== Standings ====
Pos	Team	Pld	W	D	L	GF	GA	GD	Pts	Qualification
1	Miami FC (S)	16	11	3	2	33	11	+22	36	Playoffs
2	San Francisco Deltas	16	7	5	4	17	20	−3	26	
3	New York Cosmos	16	6	6	4	22	21	+1	24	
4	Jacksonville Armada	16	6	6	4	17	16	+1	24	
5	North Carolina FC	16	6	3	7	21	22	−1	21	
6	Indy Eleven	16	4	8	4	21	22	−1	20	
7	FC Edmonton	16	4	1	11	11	21	−10	13	
8	Puerto Rico FC	16	1	6	9	19	28	−9	9	

Source: NASL
Rules for classification: 1) points; 2) total goal differential; 3) total goals scored; 4) head-to-head record; 5) away goal differential; 6) away goals scored
(S) Spring season champion

==== Results summary ====
Overall								Home						Away					
Pld	W	D	L	GF	GA	GD	Pts	W	D	L	GF	GA	GD	W	D	L	GF	GA	GD
16	6	6	4	17	16	+1	24	3	4	1	7	5	+2	3	2	3	10	11	−1

Last updated: July 15, 2017.
Source: Results

==== Results by round ====
Round	1	2	3	4	5	6	7	8	9	10	11	12	13	14	15	16
Stadium	H	A	H	A	H	H	A	A	H	H	A	A	H	A	H	A
Result	W	W	D	D	D	D	L	W	W	L	W	L	W	D	D	L
Position	2	1	1	1	1	2	5	3	2	2	2	4	3	3	3	4

Updated to match(es) played on July 15, 2017. Source: Results
A = Away; H = Home; W = Win; D = Draw; L = Loss

==== Results ====
April 2, 2017 1	Jacksonville Armada	1–0	Edmonton	Jacksonville
16:00 EDT	Glenn (yellow card) 13'; Maripuu (yellow card) 63'; George (yellow card) 69'; Banks 77'; Blake (yellow card) 84'	Report		Stadium: Hodges Stadium; Attendance: 3,472; Referee: Rubiel Vazquez

April 9, 2017 2	Edmonton	0–1	Jacksonville Armada	Edmonton
21:00 EDT	Sansara (yellow card) 75'	Report	Steinberger 7'; Beckie (yellow card) 37'	Stadium: Clarke Stadium; Attendance: 3,269; Referee: Juan Marquez

April 15, 2017 3	Jacksonville Armada	0–0	San Francisco Deltas	Jacksonville
19:00 PDT	Ryden (yellow card) 8'; Pitchkolan (yellow card) 20'; Banks (yellow card) 67'; Blake (yellow card) 90+2'	Report	Dyego (yellow card) 5'; Heinemann (yellow card) 44'	Stadium: Hodges Stadium; Attendance: 3,512; Referee: Mark Kadlecik

April 22, 2017 4	New York Cosmos	1–1	Jacksonville Armada	New York City
19:00 EDT	Márquez 22'; Ochieng (yellow card) 56'	Report	George (yellow card) 36'; Beckie (yellow card) 60'; Banks 67'	Stadium: MCU Park; Attendance: 3,605; Referee: Sorin Stoica

April 29, 2017 5	Jacksonville Armada	1–1	Indy Eleven	Jacksonville
19:00 EDT	Glenn 30'	Report	Braun 25'; Keller (yellow card) 28'; Palmer (yellow card) 71'	Stadium: Hodges Stadium; Attendance: 3,122; Referee: Rosendo Mendoza

May 6, 2017 6	Jacksonville Armada	1–1	New York Cosmos	Jacksonville
19:00 EDT	Banks (yellow card) 83'; Steinberger 90+5'	Report	Barnes (yellow card) 11'; Márquez 24' (yellow card) 24'; Ledesma (yellow card) 45+1'; Ochieng (yellow card) 87'	Stadium: Hodges Stadium; Attendance: 3,811; Referee: Rubiel Vazquez

May 13, 2017 7	North Carolina	3–1	Jacksonville Armada	Cary
19:30 EDT	Marcelin 27'; Laing 41', 69' (pen.)	Report	Blake 12' (pen.); Beckie (yellow card) 25'	Stadium: WakeMed Soccer Park; Attendance: 4,543; Referee: Baboucarr Jallow

May 19, 2017 8	San Francisco Deltas	0–3	Jacksonville Armada	San Francisco
22:30 EDT		Report	Steinberger 28', 45'; George (yellow card) 32'; Gebhard 73'	Stadium: Kezar Stadium; Attendance: 2,201; Referee: David Gantar

May 28, 2017 9	Jacksonville Armada	2–1	North Carolina	Jacksonville
16:00 EDT	Steinberger 30', 32'	Report	Ibeagha (yellow card) 54'; Albadawi (yellow card) 82'; Marcelin (yellow card) 89'; Shipalane 90+3'	Stadium: Hodges Stadium; Attendance: 2,176; Referee: Geoff Gamble

June 3, 2017 10	Jacksonville Armada	0–1	Miami	Jacksonville
19:00 EDT	Pitchkolan (yellow card) 80'	Report	Trafford (yellow card) 23'; Mares 35'; Freeman (yellow card) 54'; Martínez (yellow card) 87'	Stadium: Hodges Stadium; Attendance: 3,403; Referee: Marcos de Oliveira

June 10, 2017 11	Indy Eleven	1–4	Jacksonville Armada	Indianapolis
19:30 EDT	Zayed 10'; Franco (yellow card) 30'; Palmer (red card) 45+1'; Ring (yellow card) 48'	Report	Blake 4' (yellow card) 45+1'; Banks 41', 50'; Steinberger (yellow card) 57'; Gebhard (yellow card) 60'; Patterson-Sewell (red card) 68'; Pitchkolan (yellow card) 80'	Stadium: Michael Carroll Stadium; Attendance: 8,516; Referee: Younes Marrakchi

June 17, 2017 12	Miami	4–0	Jacksonville Armada	Miami
19:30 EDT	Stefano 15'; Rennella 27', 79' (yellow card) 81'; Martínez 85'	Report	George (yellow card) 22'; Beckie (yellow card) 57'; Steinberger (yellow card) 76'	Stadium: Riccardo Silva Stadium; Attendance: 5,289; Referee: Guido Gonzalez

June 25, 2017 13	Jacksonville Armada	Postponed	Puerto Rico	Jacksonville
18:00 EDT				Stadium: Hodges Stadium

July 1, 2017 14	Jacksonville Armada	1–0	Edmonton	Jacksonville
19:00 EDT	Gebhard 79'; Rebellón (yellow card) 87'	Report	Nicklaw (yellow card) 45'; Zebie (yellow card) 52'; Ameobi (yellow card) 76'; Watson (yellow card) 78'	Stadium: Hodges Stadium; Attendance: 2,701; Referee: Malik Badawi

July 8, 2017 15	Puerto Rico	0–0	Jacksonville Armada	Bayamón
19:30 EDT		Report		Stadium: Juan Ramón Loubriel Stadium; Attendance: 2,876; Referee: William Anderson

July 12, 2017 13	Jacksonville Armada	1–1	Puerto Rico	Jacksonville
20:00 EDT	Ryden (yellow card) 78'; Gebhard 90+2'	Report	Beckie 39' (o.g.); Gentile (yellow card) 42'; Quintillà (yellow card) 75'	Stadium: Hodges Stadium; Attendance: 2,153; Referee: Bardhyl Pashaj

July 15, 2017 16	Indy Eleven	2–0	Jacksonville Armada	Indianapolis
18:30 EDT	Vuković 48'; Zayed (yellow card) 59'; Henderson 68'	Report		Stadium: Michael Carroll Stadium; Attendance: 8,735; Referee: Alex Chilowicz

=== NASL Fall season ===
==== Standings ====
Pos	Team	Pld	W	D	L	GF	GA	GD	Pts	Qualification
1	Miami FC (F)	16	10	3	3	28	17	+11	33	Playoffs
2	San Francisco Deltas	16	7	7	2	24	15	+9	28	
3	North Carolina FC	16	5	9	2	25	15	+10	24	
4	New York Cosmos	16	4	9	3	34	30	+4	21	
5	Jacksonville Armada	16	4	7	5	21	22	−1	19	
6	Puerto Rico FC	16	4	4	8	13	23	−10	16	
7	FC Edmonton	16	3	5	8	14	21	−7	14	
8	Indy Eleven	16	3	4	9	18	34	−16	13	

Source: NASL
Rules for classification: 1) points; 2) total goal differential; 3) total goals scored; 4) head-to-head record; 5) away goal differential; 6) away goals scored
(F) Fall season champion

==== Results summary ====
Overall								Home						Away					
Pld	W	D	L	GF	GA	GD	Pts	W	D	L	GF	GA	GD	W	D	L	GF	GA	GD
16	4	7	5	21	22	−1	19	0	5	3	8	13	−5	4	2	2	13	9	+4

Last updated: October 28, 2017.
Source: Results

==== Results by round ====
Round	1	2	3	4	5	6	7	8	9	10	11	12	13	14	15	16
Stadium	H	A	A	H	H	A	A	A	H	H	A	A	H	H	H	A
Result	D	L	D	L	L	W	W	D	L	D	L	W	D	D	D	W
Position	3	7	8	8	8	7	6	6	7	6	7	5	5	5	5	5

Updated to match(es) played on October 28, 2017. Source: Results
A = Away; H = Home; W = Win; D = Draw; L = Loss

==== Results ====
July 30, 2017 17	Jacksonville Armada	1–1	San Francisco Deltas	Jacksonville
18:00 EDT	George (yellow card) 29'; Blake 35' (pen.) (yellow card) 45+3'; Beckie (yellow card) 78'	Report	Jackson (yellow card) 28'; Cruz 58'; Jordan (yellow card) 84'; Lubahn (yellow card) 86'; Stephens (yellow card) 90+2'; Heinemann (yellow card) 90+3'	Stadium: Hodges Stadium; Attendance: 3,126; Referee: Jon Freemon

August 5, 2017 18	Puerto Rico	1–0	Jacksonville Armada	Bayamón
19:30 EDT	Doyle 43' (yellow card) 90+1'; Ramos (yellow card) 48'	Report	George (yellow card) 53'; Beckie (yellow card) 54'; Doue (yellow card) 67' (yellow-red card) 86'	Stadium: Juan Ramón Loubriel Stadium; Attendance: 3,382; Referee: Javier Santos

August 12, 2017 19	North Carolina	2–2	Jacksonville Armada	Cary
19:30 EDT	Fortune (yellow card) 26' (goal) 44'; Laing 68'	Report	Taylor 3'; Blake 18' (pen.) (yellow card) 90'; George (yellow card) 28'	Stadium: WakeMed Soccer Park; Attendance: 4,272; Referee: Ramy Touchan

August 16, 2017 20	Jacksonville Armada	1–2	Puerto Rico	Jacksonville
19:00 EDT	Taylor 60'; Blake (yellow card) 68'; George (yellow card) 70'; Pitchkolan (yellow card) 90+1'; Patterson-Sewell (yellow card) 90+5'	Report	Quintillà (yellow card) 38'; Doyle 53'; Puerto (yellow card) 59'; Gentile 73'; Rivera (yellow card) 89'	Stadium: Hodges Stadium; Attendance: 780; Referee: Farhad Dadkho

August 19, 2017 21	Jacksonville Armada	0–1	Miami	Jacksonville
19:30 EDT	Taylor (yellow card) 25'	Report	Chavez (yellow card) 11' (goal) 41'; Martínez (yellow card) 74'	Stadium: Hodges Stadium; Attendance: 1,186; Referee: Caleb Mendez

August 26, 2017 22	Indy Eleven	2–3	Jacksonville Armada	Indianapolis
19:30 EDT	Keller (yellow card) 35'; Watson-Siriboe (yellow card) 38'; Braun (yellow card) 61'; Speas 66' (yellow card) 83'; Goldsmith 90+2'	Report	Blake (yellow card) 20' (goal) 28', 40', 62'; Banks (yellow card) 44'; Rebellón (yellow card) 76'	Stadium: Michael Carroll Stadium; Attendance: 8,862; Referee: Rubiel Vazquez

September 3, 2017 23	New York Cosmos	0–2	Jacksonville Armada	Brooklyn
19:30 EDT	Barnes (yellow card) 9'; Moyal (yellow card) 33'; Maurer (yellow card) 33'; Arango (yellow card) 90+2'	Report	Pitchkolan (yellow card) 23'; Guerra 29' (o.g.); Kilduff 33'; Rebellón (yellow card) 37'; Shriver (yellow card) 64'; Banks (yellow card) 69'	Stadium: MCU Park; Attendance: 4,873; Referee: Younes Marrakchi

September 9, 2017 24	Jacksonville Armada	–	Indy Eleven	Jacksonville
19:00 EDT				Stadium: Hodges Stadium
Note: Match rescheduled to September 27 due to Hurricane Irma.

September 17, 2017 25	New York Cosmos	3–3	Jacksonville Armada	Brooklyn
17:00 EDT	Ochieng (yellow card) 14'; Javi Márquez (yellow card) 67' (goal) 79'; Starikov 89'; Guerra 90+4'	Report	Kilduff 13', 41'; Blake 65' (pen.); George (yellow card) 75'	Stadium: MCU Park; Attendance: 4,229; Referee: Fotis Bazakos

September 24, 2017 26	Jacksonville Armada	0–3	Miami	Jacksonville
16:00 EDT	Pitchkolan (yellow card) 14'	Report	Stefano 15'; Chavez 90', 90+6'	Stadium: Hodges Stadium; Attendance: 3,313; Referee: Caleb Mendez

September 27, 2017 24	Jacksonville Armada	0–0	Indy Eleven	Jacksonville
19:00 EDT	George (yellow card) 21'; Kilduff (yellow card) 32'; Pitchkolan (yellow card) 62'	Report	Smart (yellow card) 37'; Ring (yellow card) 69'	Stadium: Hodges Stadium; Attendance: 1,881; Referee: Daniel Gutierrez
Note: Match rescheduled from September 9 due to Hurricane Irma.

October 1, 2017 27	Miami	1–0	Jacksonville Armada	Miami
18:00 EDT	Stefano 21'; Palmer (yellow card) 83'	Report	Steinberger (yellow card) 31'; George (yellow card) 51'; Blake (yellow card) 65' (red card) 90+4'; Patterson-Sewell (yellow card) 90+3'	Stadium: Riccardo Silva Stadium; Attendance: 4,011; Referee: Juan Guzmán

October 6, 2017 28	FC Edmonton	0–1	Jacksonville Armada	Edmonton
21:00 EDT		Report	Banks (yellow card) 59'; Kilduff 68'; Ryden (yellow card) 88'	Stadium: Clarke Stadium; Attendance: 3,098; Referee: Drew Fischer

October 13, 2017 29	Jacksonville Armada	1–1	North Carolina	Jacksonville
19:30 EDT	Steinberger 21'; Ryden (yellow card) 75'	Report	Black (yellow card) 23'; Renan 36'	Stadium: Hodges Stadium; Attendance: 4,967; Referee: Michael Radchuk

October 18, 2017 30	Jacksonville Armada	1–1	FC Edmonton	Jacksonville
19:00 EDT	George (yellow card) 9'; Blake 39' Jérôme (yellow card) 65'; Rebellón (yellow card) 79'	Report	Eustáquio (yellow card) 40'; Keegan 62'; Diakité (yellow card) 83'; Ledgerwood (yellow card) 83'; Ingham (yellow card) 90+3'	Stadium: Hodges Stadium; Attendance: 1,348; Referee: Daniel Radford

October 22, 2017 31	Jacksonville Armada	4–4	New York Cosmos	Jacksonville
17:00 EDT	Steinberger 4'; Rebellón (yellow card) 14'; Kilduff (yellow card) 18'; Taylor (yellow card) 20'; Beckie 22'; Ryden 26'; Eloundou 79'	Report	Ochieng 7'; Jakovic (yellow card) 18'; Starikov 58'; Mkosana 66'; Mulligan 77'	Stadium: Hodges Stadium; Attendance: 7,611; Referee: Geoff Gamble

October 28, 2017 32	San Francisco Deltas	0–2	Jacksonville Armada	San Francisco
17:00 EDT	Tissot (yellow card) 43'; Bekker (yellow card) 73'	Report	Banks 27'; George (yellow card) 40'; Taylor 60'	Stadium: Kezar Stadium; Attendance: 4,755; Referee: Farhad Dadkho

=== U.S. Open Cup ===
May 17, 2017 Third Round	Miami United	1–2	Jacksonville Armada	Hialeah
19:00 EDT	Berterame (yellow card) 5'; Camilli 32'; Sepiurka (yellow card) 41'; Fuenmayor (yellow card) 56'; Navarro (yellow card) 71'; Tersano (yellow card) 90+4'	Report	Pitchkolan 35' (yellow card) 59'; Blake 42' (pen.) (yellow card) 82'; Gebhard (yellow card) 90+1'; Johnson (yellow card) 90+3'	Stadium: Ted Hendricks Stadium; Attendance: 175; Referee: Jonathon Quinter

May 31, 2017 Fourth Round	Jacksonville Armada	0–1	Charleston Battery	Jacksonville
19:00 EDT	Rebellón (yellow card) 90+3'	Report	Beckie 25' (o.g.); Lasso (yellow card) 56'; Anunga (yellow card) 58'; Hackshaw (yellow card) 90+4'	Stadium: Hodges Stadium; Attendance: 831; Referee: Esteban Rosano

== Squad statistics ==
As of Match played October 28, 2017

=== Appearances and goals ===
No.	Pos	Nat	Player	Total		NASL Spring Season		NASL Fall Season		U.S. Open Cup	
No.	Pos	Nat	Player	Apps	Goals	Apps	Goals	Apps	Goals	Apps	Goals
1	GK	(United States) USA	Caleb Patterson-Sewell	32	0	15	0	16	0	1	0
2	DF	(Canada) CAN	Drew Beckie	30	1	15+1	0	10+2	1	1+1	0
3	DF	(United States) USA	Peabo Doue	4	0	0	0	1+2	0	1	0
4	DF	(Haiti) HAI	Mechack Jérôme	34	0	16	0	16	0	2	0
5	DF	(United States) USA	Aaron Pitchkolan	33	1	15	0	14+2	0	2	1
6	MF	(Sweden) SWE	Nicklas Maripuu	17	0	10	0	3+2	0	2	0
7	FW	(Panama) PAN	Tony Taylor	12	3	0	0	11+1	3	0	0
8	MF	(Scotland) SCO	Jack Blake	29	10	12+1	2	13+1	7	2	1
9	FW	(Republic of Ireland) IRL	Ciarán Kilduff	12	4	0	0	11+1	4	0	0
10	FW	(United States) USA	J. C. Banks	34	5	14+2	4	14+2	1	1+1	0
11	FW	(United States) USA	Jemal Johnson	24	0	10+4	0	1+7	0	0+2	0
12	DF	(United States) USA	Devon Fisher	7	0	2+2	0	1+1	0	1	0
13	GK	(United States) USA	Kyle Nasta	3	0	1+1	0	0	0	1	0
15	DF	(United States) USA	Michael O'Sullivan	2	0	0+1	0	0+1	0	0	0
17	FW	(United States) USA	Brian Shriver	12	0	0	0	5+6	0	1	0
19	MF	(Trinidad and Tobago) TTO	Kevan George	27	0	15	0	12	0	0	0
22	DF	(United States) USA	Kalen Ryden	32	1	16	0	15	1	1	0
23	MF	(United States) USA	Zach Steinberger	33	8	16	6	14+2	2	1	0
25	MF	(Colombia) COL	Bryam Rebellón	23	0	1+8	0	11+1	0	2	0
27	FW	(United States) USA	Derek Gebhard	34	4	9+7	4	6+10	0	2	0
99	FW	(Cameroon) CMR	Charles Eloundou	22	1	2+10	0	2+6	1	1+1	0
Players who left Jacksonville Armada during the season:
7	MF	(Wales) WAL	Danny Barrow	3	0	0+2	0	0	0	1	0
9	FW	(Trinidad and Tobago) TTO	Jonathan Glenn	15	1	7+7	1	0	0	0+1	0

=== Goal scorers ===
Place	Position	Nation	Number	Name	NASL Spring Season	NASL Fall Season	U.S. Open Cup	Total
1	MF	(Scotland)	8	Jack Blake	2	7	1	10
2	MF	(United States)	23	Zach Steinberger	6	2	0	8
3	FW	(United States)	10	J. C. Banks	4	1	0	5
4	FW	(United States)	27	Derek Gebhard	4	0	0	4
4	FW	(Republic of Ireland)	9	Ciarán Kilduff	0	4	0	4
6	FW	(Panama)	7	Tony Taylor	0	3	0	3
7				Own goal	1	1	0	2
8	FW	(Trinidad and Tobago)	9	Jonathan Glenn	1	0	0	1
8	FW	(Canada)	2	Drew Beckie	0	1	0	1
8	FW	(United States)	22	Kalen Ryden	0	1	0	1
8	FW	(Cameroon)	99	Charles Eloundou	0	1	0	1
8	DF	(United States)	5	Aaron Pitchkolan	0	0	1	1
TOTALS					18	21	2	41

=== Disciplinary record ===
Number	Nation	Position	Name	NASL Spring Season		NASL Fall Season		U.S. Open Cup		Total	
Number	Nation	Position	Name	Yellow card	Red card	Yellow card	Red card	Yellow card	Red card	Yellow card	Red card
1	(United States)	GK	Caleb Patterson-Sewell	0	1	2	0	0	0	2	1
2	(Canada)	DF	Drew Beckie	4	0	3	0	0	0	7	0
3	(United States)	DF	Peabo Doue	0	0	2	1	0	0	2	1
4	(Haiti)	DF	Mechack Jérôme	0	0	1	0	0	0	1	0
5	(United States)	DF	Aaron Pitchkolan	3	0	4	0	1	0	8	0
6	(Sweden)	MF	Nicklas Maripuu	1	0	0	0	0	0	1	0
7	(Panama)	FW	Tony Taylor	0	0	2	0	0	0	2	0
8	(Scotland)	MF	Jack Blake	3	0	5	1	1	0	9	1
9	(Trinidad and Tobago)	FW	Jonathan Glenn	1	0	0	0	0	0	1	0
9	(Republic of Ireland)	FW	Ciarán Kilduff	0	0	2	0	0	0	2	0
10	(United States)	FW	J. C. Banks	2	0	3	0	0	0	5	0
11	(United States)	FW	Jemal Johnson	0	0	0	0	1	0	1	0
17	(United States)	FW	Brian Shriver	0	0	0	0	1	0	1	0
19	(Trinidad and Tobago)	MF	Kevan George	4	0	9	0	0	0	13	0
22	(United States)	DF	Kalen Ryden	2	0	2	0	0	0	4	0
23	(United States)	MF	Zach Steinberger	2	0	1	0	0	0	3	0
25	(Colombia)	MF	Bryam Rebellón	1	0	4	0	1	0	6	0
27	(United States)	FW	Derek Gebhard	0	0	0	0	1	0	1	0
			TOTALS	23	1	41	2	5	0	69	3
