= 2017 New York Cosmos season =

New York Cosmos
2017 season
- Owner: New York Cosmos LLC
- Chairman: Rocco B. Commisso
- Head coach: Giovanni Savarese
- Stadium: MCU Park; Brooklyn, New York
- NASL: Spring: Third Fall: Fourth Combined: Fourth
- Soccer Bowl: Runners-Up
- U.S. Open Cup: 2nd Round
- Top goalscorer: League: Emmanuel Ledesma (10); All: Emmanuel Ledesma (10)
- Highest home attendance: 6,818; October 14 v FC Edmonton
- Lowest home attendance: 2,240; May 14 v Puerto Rico FC
- Average home league attendance: 4,891
Home colors	Away colors

The 2017 New York Cosmos season was the new Cosmos' fifth season of existence, playing in the new North American Soccer League. Including the previous franchise, this was the 19th season of a club entitled New York Cosmos playing professional soccer in the New York metropolitan area.

== Background ==
The 2016 season saw the Cosmos achieve a league-best 20–5–7 combined regular season record. In the Soccer Bowl playoffs, the Cosmos defeated Rayo OKC in the semifinals before beating Indy Eleven in penalty kicks in Soccer Bowl 2016 on November 13, 2016. It was the franchise's sixth division two honor. Including the previous franchise, it was the Cosmos' eighth Soccer Bowl title.

Following that successful 2016 Championship run, the Cosmos and the league faced serious questions on survival. In the week after the championship game, league officials and team owners met in Atlanta for a crisis meeting on November 29. Two franchises (Ottawa Fury FC and Tampa Bay Rowdies) had already made plans to leave for the USL. The Cosmos had already started laying off front office staff and entered furlough on other staff and club members.

On December 14, Cosmos chairman Seamus O'Brien publicly announced that the Cosmos will not field a team in 2017. The USSF still had not made a decision on the divisional status of the NASL or USL. The announcement and talks had been delayed several times, and O'Brien felt that the Cosmos could not play in a Division 3 sanctioned league. By this time the Cosmos had released all of their players and coaching staff from their contracts and left a skeleton crew to operate the front office.

The following players signed with other teams prior to the announcement of the Cosmos returning for 2017. (Danny Szetela had signed with the NASL expansion San Francisco Deltas but returned to the Cosmos.)

No.	Pos.	Player	Signed With	Fee/notes	Date	Source
25	FW	(Costa Rica) Jairo Arrieta	(Costa Rica) Herediano	Signed	19 December 2016	
77	FW	(Zimbabwe) Lucky Mkosana	(Finland) IFK Mariehamn	Signed	1 January 2017	
7	FW	(Bolivia) Yasmani Duk	(Saudi Arabia) Ettifaq FC	Signed	2 January 2017	
16	MF	(Scotland) Adam Moffat	(United States) Sacramento Republic FC	Signed	2 January 2017	
23	DF	(United States) Jimmy Ockford	(United States) Reno 1868 FC	Signed	10 January 2017	
18	MF	(Venezuela) Juan Arango	(Venezuela) Zulia FC	Signed	10 January 2017	
19	MF	(Venezuela) Yohandry Orozco	(Venezuela) Zulia FC	Signed	10 January 2017	
21	FW	(Colombia) David Diosa	(United States) OKC Energy FC	Signed	12 January 2017	
15	MF	(Spain) Ruben Bover	(England) Barnet	Signed	27 January 2017	

On January 6, 2017; the USSF announced that they had granted the NASL and USL provisional Division 2 status for the 2017 seasons. Both leagues received waivers to structuring laws and regulations that must be met to keep their Division 2 status in the following years. Four days later on January 10, the Cosmos publicly announced that Rocco Commisso (CEO of Mediacom) had taken over as majority owner of the team. The Italian had emigrated to the United States when he was a child and played for Columbia University's soccer program before trying out for the US Men's National Olympic Team in 1972. Columbia University's soccer stadium is named after him, leading many to believe that the Cosmos may play there or at MCU Park in 2017.

On February 2; the club made the "re-rebirth" official by announcing that many players have already returned and that they will be playing 16 regular season games at MCU Park in Brooklyn. Season tickets went on sale first to former season ticket holders on February 3.

On March 17, 2017, the team announced a new broadcasting deal with MSG and WPIX-TV. Their previous broadcaster, One World Sports, had been shut down.

== Club ==
=== Kit ===
Supplier: Inaria / Sponsor: Emirates (airline)
Last Update: November 12 game @ San Francisco Deltas

Home; 2 Games	Home alt. 17 Games	Away; 9 Games	Away alt. 7 Games

=== Roster ===
Note: Flags indicate national team as defined under FIFA eligibility rules; some limited exceptions apply. Players may hold more than one non-FIFA nationality.

No.	Pos.	Nation	Player
1	GK	USA	Jimmy Maurer
2	DF	USA	Ryan Richter
3	DF	KEN	David Ochieng
4	DF	USA	Carlos Mendes
11	MF	ESA	Andrés Flores
12	GK	USA	Kyle Zobeck
14	MF	USA	Danny Szetela
16	MF	VEN	Juan Francisco Guerra
17	DF	ESP	Ayoze García
20	MF	COL	Wálter Restrepo
24	GK	USA	Brian Holt
26	MF	USA	Eric Calvillo
28	DF	USA	Jimmy Mulligan
29	DF	USA	Alexis Velela

== Competitions ==
=== Exhibition ===
==== Match reports ====
February 28, 2017 Friendly	Atlántico FC (Dominican Republic)	0—1	(United States) New York Cosmos	Puerto Plata, Dominican Republic
TBD EDT UTC−4		Report	Guerra 49'	Stadium: Estadio Leonel Plácido

March 3, 2017 Friendly	Atlético Pantoja (Dominican Republic)	0—2	(United States) New York Cosmos	Santo Domingo, Dominican Republic
TBD EDT UTC−4		Report	Starikov 77'; Herrera 90+4'	Stadium: Estadio Olímpico

March 5, 2017 Friendly	Dominican Republic	1—5	(United States) New York Cosmos	Santo Domingo, Dominican Republic
TBD EDT UTC−4	Espinal 44'	Report	Márquez 15' (pen.); Ledesma 20'; Herrera 47', 50'; Mancini 82'	Stadium: Estadio Olímpico

March 19, 2017 Friendly	Bermuda	1—1	(United States) New York Cosmos	Hamilton, Bermuda
14:00 EDT UTC−4	Ming 58'	Report	Flores 90+1'	Stadium: Bermuda National Stadium; Referee: Anthony Bailey

May 20, 2017 Friendly	Al-Hilal FC (Saudi Arabia)	0—0	(United States) New York Cosmos	Riyadh, Saudi Arabia
				Stadium: Prince Faisal bin Fahd Stadium

July 22, 2017 Friendly	New York Cosmos (United States)	2—0	(Spain) Valencia CF	Regina, Saskatchewan
	Calvillo 53'; Ledesma 77'	Highlights		Stadium: Mosaic Stadium

==== Exhibition Statistics ====
3 Goals

- (El Salvador) Irvin Herrera

2 Goals

- (Argentina) Emmanuel Ledesma

1 Goal

- (Venezuela) Juan Francisco Guerra
- (Ukraine) Eugene Starikov
- (Spain) Javi Márquez
- (Italy) Andrea Mancini
- (El Salvador) Andrés Flores
- (United States) Eric Calvillo

=== NASL Spring Season ===
The NASL regular season will now feature two equal seasons

==== Standings ====
Pos	Team	Pld	W	D	L	GF	GA	GD	Pts	Qualification
1	Miami FC (S)	16	11	3	2	33	11	+22	36	Playoffs
2	San Francisco Deltas	16	7	5	4	17	20	−3	26	
3	New York Cosmos	16	6	6	4	22	21	+1	24	
4	Jacksonville Armada	16	6	6	4	17	16	+1	24	
5	North Carolina FC	16	6	3	7	21	22	−1	21	
6	Indy Eleven	16	4	8	4	21	22	−1	20	
7	FC Edmonton	16	4	1	11	11	21	−10	13	
8	Puerto Rico FC	16	1	6	9	19	28	−9	9	

Source: NASL
Rules for classification: 1) points; 2) total goal differential; 3) total goals scored; 4) head-to-head record; 5) away goal differential; 6) away goals scored
(S) Spring season champion

==== Results ====
Overall								Home						Away					
Pld	W	D	L	GF	GA	GD	Pts	W	D	L	GF	GA	GD	W	D	L	GF	GA	GD
16	6	6	4	22	21	+1	24	2	4	2	14	16	−2	4	2	2	8	5	+3

Last updated: July 18, 2017.
Source: http://www.nycosmos.com/standings

===== Results by round =====
Round	1	2	3	4	5	6	7	8	9	10	11	12	13	14	15	16
Stadium	A	H	A	H	A	A	H	H	A	H	H	H	A	H	A	A
Result	D	L	W	D	W	D	W	D	W	L	D	W	L	D	L	W
Position	5	7	4	5	4	4	3	4	3	3	4	3	3	4	4	3

Updated to match(es) played on July 18, 2017. Source: nycosmos.com
A = Away; H = Home; W = Win; D = Draw; L = Loss

==== Match reports ====
March 25, 2017 Match 1	Puerto Rico FC	0—0	New York Cosmos	Bayamón, Puerto Rico
19:30 EDT UTC−4		Report		Stadium: Juan Ramón Loubriel Stadium; Attendance: 5,692; Referee: Kevin Morrison

April 1, 2017 Match 2	New York Cosmos	0—3	Miami FC	Brooklyn, New York
19:00 EDT UTC−4	Szetela (yellow card) 53'; Mulligan (red card) 90+3'	Report	Mares 51' (yellow card) 54'; Richter 67' (o.g.); Stéfano 71'; Poku (yellow card) 74'	Stadium: MCU Park; Attendance: 6,274; Referee: Rosendo Mendoza

April 8, 2017 Match 3	Miami FC	0—2	New York Cosmos	Miami, Florida
19:30 EDT UTC−4	Ryan (yellow card) 63'; Lahoud (yellow card) 84'; Freeman (yellow card) 90+3'	Report	Guerra (yellow card) 37'; Szetela 58'; Márquez (yellow card) 77'; Ayoze 90+4' (pen.)	Stadium: FIU Stadium; Attendance: 9,515; Referee: Marcos De Oliveira

April 22, 2017 Match 4	New York Cosmos	1—1	Jacksonville Armada FC	Brooklyn, New York
19:00 EDT UTC−4	Márquez 22'; Ochieng (yellow card) 56'	Report	George (yellow card) 36'; Beckie (yellow card) 60'; Banks 67'	Stadium: MCU Park; Attendance: 3,605; Referee: Sorin Stoica

April 29, 2017 Match 5	San Francisco Deltas	0—1	New York Cosmos	San Francisco, California
22:00 EDT UTC−4	Portilla (yellow card) 18'; Teijsse (yellow card) 59'; Bekker (yellow card) 86'	Report	Ledesma (yellow card) 26' (goal) 69'; Mulligan (yellow card) 60'; Szetela (yellow card) 78'	Stadium: Kezar Stadium; Attendance: 3,302; Referee: Timothy Ford

May 6, 2017 Match 6	Jacksonville Armada FC	1—1	New York Cosmos	Jacksonville, Florida
19:00 EDT UTC−4	Banks (yellow card) 83'; Steinberger 90+5'	Report	Barnes (yellow card) 11'; Márquez 24' (yellow card) 25'; Ledesma (yellow card) 45+1'; Ochieng (yellow card) 87'	Stadium: Hodges Stadium; Attendance: 3,811; Referee: Rubiel Vazquez

May 14, 2017 Match 7	New York Cosmos	4—3	Puerto Rico FC	Brooklyn, New York
13:00 EDT UTC−4	Richter (yellow card) 24' (goal) 50'; Flores 42'; Guerra 45+2'; Restrepo 58'; Márquez (yellow card) 80'	Report	Gentile 15'; Welshman 16'; Yuma (red card) 35'; Cristiano 64' (pen.); Kavita (yellow card) 80'	Stadium: MCU Park; Attendance: 2,240; Referee: Jorge RamÍrez

May 27, 2017 Match 8	New York Cosmos	0—0	San Francisco Deltas	Brooklyn, New York
19:00 EDT UTC−4	Ledesma (yellow card) 45+1'; Restrepo (yellow card) 63'; Guerra (yellow card) 90+6'	Report	Gibson (yellow card) 43'; Jordan (yellow card) 58'; Jackson (yellow card) 69'; Teijsse (yellow card) 90+3'	Stadium: MCU Park; Attendance: 5,421; Referee: Victor Rivas

June 4, 2017 Match 9	North Carolina FC	0—1	New York Cosmos	Cary, North Carolina
16:00 EDT UTC−4		Report	Guerra 52'; Szetela (yellow card) 75'; Holt (yellow card) 80'; Flores (yellow card) 90+1'	Stadium: WakeMed Soccer Park; Attendance: 4,027; Referee: Younes Marrakchi

June 7, 2017 Match 10	New York Cosmos	2—4	FC Edmonton	Brooklyn, New York
19:30 EDT UTC−4	Herrera 45+1'; Barnes (red card) 74'; Guerra (red card) 79'; Ayoze 90+4' (pen.)	Report	Diakité (yellow card) 60'; Nyassi 69'; Ameobi 72', 89'; Keegan 85'	Stadium: MCU Park; Attendance: 3,520; Referee: Geoff Gamble

June 10, 2017 Match 11	New York Cosmos	2—2	North Carolina FC	Brooklyn, New York
19:30 EDT UTC−4	Herrera 7'; Mendes (yellow card) 30'; Alhassan 84'	Report	Schuler 11'; Laing 45'; Ibeagha (yellow card) 90+4'	Stadium: MCU Park; Attendance: 4,285; Referee: Rubiel Vazquez

June 16, 2017 Match 12	New York Cosmos	4—2	Puerto Rico FC	Brooklyn, New York
19:30 EDT UTC−4	Ayoze 13'; Márquez (yellow card) 60'; Ledesma 69'; Restrepo 74'; Vranjicán 90+4'	Report	Soria (yellow card) 12'; Puerto 17'; Doyle 24' (yellow card) 26'; Gentile (yellow card) 39'; Quintillà (yellow card) 43'; Dawson (red card) 81'; Culbertson (yellow card) 90+1'	Stadium: MCU Park; Attendance: 4,927; Referee: David Gantar

June 24, 2017 Match 13	Miami FC	2—1	New York Cosmos	Miami, Florida
19:30 EDT UTC−4	Stefano 20'; Rennella 48'; Mares (yellow card) 56'; Poku (red card) 59'	Report	Ledesma 6'; Ricther (yellow card) 16'; Guerra (yellow card) 18'; Ochieng (yellow card) 51'	Stadium: FIU Stadium; Attendance: 6,215; Referee: Timothy Ford

July 4, 2017 Match 14	New York Cosmos	1—1	Indy Eleven	Brooklyn, New York
19:30 EDT UTC−4	Calvillo (yellow card) 67'; Ledesma 86' (pen.); Richter (yellow card) 90'	Report	Speas 33'; Goldsmith (yellow card) 72'; Palmer (yellow card) 83'; Falvey (yellow card) 90'	Stadium: MCU Park; Attendance: 6,734; Referee: Marcos de Oliveira

July 8, 2017 Match 15	Indy Eleven	2—1	New York Cosmos	Indianapolis, Indiana
19:30 EDT UTC−4	Smart 17' (pen.); Braun 75'	Report	Ledesma 27'; Bardic (yellow card) 90+1'	Stadium: Michael Carroll Stadium; Attendance: 8,748; Referee: Alejandro Mariscal

July 15, 2017 Match 16	FC Edmonton	0—1	New York Cosmos	Edmonton, Alberta
21:00 EDT UTC−4	Eustáquio (yellow card) 29'; Smith (yellow card) 62'; Watson (yellow card) 88'	Report	Calvillo 79'	Stadium: Clarke Stadium; Attendance: 4,096; Referee: Juan Márquez

=== NASL Fall Season ===
The NASL regular season will now feature two equal seasons

==== Standings ====
Pos	Team	Pld	W	D	L	GF	GA	GD	Pts	Qualification
1	Miami FC (F)	16	10	3	3	28	17	+11	33	Playoffs
2	San Francisco Deltas	16	7	7	2	24	15	+9	28	
3	North Carolina FC	16	5	9	2	25	15	+10	24	
4	New York Cosmos	16	4	9	3	34	30	+4	21	
5	Jacksonville Armada	16	4	7	5	21	22	−1	19	
6	Puerto Rico FC	16	4	4	8	13	23	−10	16	
7	FC Edmonton	16	3	5	8	14	21	−7	14	
8	Indy Eleven	16	3	4	9	18	34	−16	13	

Source: NASL
Rules for classification: 1) points; 2) total goal differential; 3) total goals scored; 4) head-to-head record; 5) away goal differential; 6) away goals scored
(F) Fall season champion

==== Results ====
Overall								Home						Away					
Pld	W	D	L	GF	GA	GD	Pts	W	D	L	GF	GA	GD	W	D	L	GF	GA	GD
16	4	9	3	34	30	+4	21	3	4	2	17	15	+2	1	5	1	17	15	+2

Last updated: October 28, 2017.
Source: http://www.nycosmos.com/standings

===== Results by round =====
Round	1	2	3	4	5	6	7	8	9	10	11	12	13	14	15	16
Stadium	H	A	A	H	A	H	A	H	H	H	H	A	H	A	A	H
Result	W	L	D	D	D	L	D	D	D	L	W	D	D	W	D	W
Position	1	5	5	5	5	7	7	7	7	6	5	4	4	4	4	4

Updated to match(es) played on October 28, 2017. Source: nycosmos.com
A = Away; H = Home; W = Win; D = Draw; L = Loss

==== Match reports ====
July 29, 2017 Match 1	New York Cosmos	3—1	Miami FC	Brooklyn, New York
19:00 EDT UTC−4	Ledesma (red card) 19'; Flores (yellow card) 25'; Guerra (yellow card) 36'; Calvillo 64', 79' (yellow card) 82'; Moyal 90' (yellow card) 90+1'	Report	Freeman (red card) 25'; Poku 69'; Ryan (yellow card) 82'	Stadium: MCU Park; Attendance: 5,416; Referee: Ramy Touchan

August 5, 2017 Match 2	San Francisco Deltas	2—1	New York Cosmos	San Francisco, California
22:00 EDT UTC−4	Heinemann (yellow card) 26' (goal) 45+1' (pen.); Reiner (yellow card) 33'; Hopkins 36'; Dagoberto (yellow card) 45+5'; Jackson (yellow card) 75'	Report	Vranjicán 3'; Ochieng (yellow card) 38'; Ayoze (yellow card) 82'	Stadium: Kezar Stadium; Attendance: 3,369; Referee: Malik Badawi

August 11, 2017 Match 3	FC Edmonton	1—1	New York Cosmos	Edmonton, Alberta
21:00 EDT UTC−4	Fordyce 45'; Corea (yellow card) 83'	Report	Ledesma 66'; Ayoze (yellow card) 81'; Guerra (yellow card) 84'; Moyal (yellow card) 87'	Stadium: Clarke Stadium; Attendance: 2,758; Referee: Alain Ruch

August 19, 2017 Match 4	New York Cosmos	3—3	Indy Eleven	Brooklyn, New York
19:30 EDT UTC−4	Jakovic 29'; Vranjicán 50'; Mulligan (yellow card) 57'; Guerra 84'	Report	Torrado 10', 14' (yellow card) 35'; Zayed 53'; Smart (yellow card) 90+8'	Stadium: MCU Park; Attendance: 6,110; Referee: David Gantar

August 26, 2017 Match 5	North Carolina FC	2—2	New York Cosmos	Cary, North Carolina
19:30 EDT UTC−4	Albadawi (yellow card) 45' (goal) 46'; Molano (yellow card) 86'; Gorne 90'	Report	Vranjicán (yellow card) 19'; Flores 59'; Starikov 71'; Szetela (yellow card) 90+1'; Richter (yellow card) 90+6'	Stadium: WakeMed Soccer Park; Attendance: 4,205; Referee: Bardhyl Pashaj

September 3, 2017 Match 6	New York Cosmos	0—2	Jacksonville Armada FC	Brooklyn, New York
19:30 EDT UTC−4	Barnes (yellow card) 9'; Moyal (yellow card) 33'; Maurer (yellow card) 33'; Arango (yellow card) 90+2'	Report	Pitchkolan (yellow card) 23'; Guerra 29' (o.g.); Kilduff 33'; Rebellón (yellow card) 37'; Shriver (yellow card) 64'; Banks (yellow card) 69'	Stadium: MCU Park; Attendance: 4,873; Referee: Younes Marrakchi

September 6, 2017 Match 7	Miami FC	3—3	New York Cosmos	Miami, Florida
20:00 EDT UTC−4	Lahoud (yellow card) 39'; Freeman (yellow card) 41'; Chavez 44', 63', 90'	Report	Bardic 10'; Mendes (yellow card) 53'; Richter (yellow card) 67'; Vranjicán 81'; Márquez 90+2'	Stadium: FIU Stadium; Attendance: 1,529; Referee: Geoff Gamble

September 9, 2017 Match 8	Puerto Rico FC	—	New York Cosmos	Bayamón, Puerto Rico
19:30 EDT UTC−4				Stadium: Juan Ramón Loubriel Stadium

September 17, 2017 Match 8	New York Cosmos	3—3	Jacksonville Armada FC	Brooklyn, New York
17:00 EDT UTC−4	Ochieng (yellow card) 14'; Márquez 79'; Starikov 89'; Guerra 90+4'	Report	Kilduff 13', 41'; Blake 65' (pen.); George (yellow card) 75'	Stadium: MCU Park; Attendance: 4,229; Referee: Fotis Bazakos

September 20, 2017 Match 9	New York Cosmos	2—2	San Francisco Deltas	Brooklyn, New York
19:30 EDT UTC−4	Guerra 19' (yellow card) 58'; Vranjicán 61' (pen.); Ayoze (yellow card) 90+4'	Report	Jordan (yellow card) 16'; Dyego (yellow card) 28'; Stephens (red card) 62'; Sandoval 80' (pen.), 85'; Jackson (yellow card) 88'	Stadium: MCU Park; Attendance: 4,360; Referee: Guido Gonzalez Jr.

September 23, 2017 Match 10	New York Cosmos	0—2	North Carolina FC	Brooklyn, New York
19:00 EDT UTC−4	Mendes (yellow card) 37'; Jakovic (yellow card) 89'	Report	Gorne 12'; Albadawi (yellow card) 35' da Luz 45+3'	Stadium: MCU Park; Attendance: 4,666; Referee: Joseph Dickerson

October 1, 2017 Match 11	New York Cosmos	1—0	Puerto Rico FC	Brooklyn, New York
17:00 EDT UTC−4	Mendes (yellow card) 13'; Mulligan (yellow card) 58'; Márquez 73'; Ayoze (yellow card) 80'; Jakovic (yellow card) 82'; Maurer (yellow card) 90+2'	Report	Puerto (yellow card) 49'; Martínez (yellow card) 54'; Gentile (yellow card) 77'; Ramírez (red card) 90+4'	Stadium: MCU Park; Attendance: 3,733; Referee: Henrik Karlsson

October 7, 2017 Match 12	Indy Eleven	2—2	New York Cosmos	Indianapolis, Indiana
19:30 EDT UTC−4	Smart 27'; Falvey (yellow card) 32'; Ring (yellow card) 53'; Torrado (yellow card) 53'; Zayed 64' (yellow card) 90+3'	Report	Ledesma 36'; Márquez 69'; Ochieng (yellow card) 90+3'	Stadium: Michael Carroll Stadium; Attendance: 8,998; Referee: Juan Guzman Jr

October 14, 2017 Match 13	New York Cosmos	0—0	FC Edmonton	Brooklyn, New York
19:00 EDT UTC−4	Calvillo (yellow card) 51'	Report	Eustáquio (yellow card) 23'	Stadium: MCU Park; Attendance: 6,818; Referee: Younes Marrakchi

October 18, 2017 Match 14	Puerto Rico FC	1—4	New York Cosmos	Lauderhill, Florida
19:30 EDT UTC−4	Kafari (yellow card) 74'; Rivera 89'	Report	Ayoze 35', 84' (pen.); Starikov 41'; Bardic 74'	Stadium: Central Broward Regional Park; Referee: Luis Guardia

October 22, 2017 Match 15	Jacksonville Armada FC	4—4	New York Cosmos	Jacksonville, Florida
16:00 EDT UTC−4	Steinberger 4'; Rebellón (yellow card) 14'; Kilduff (yellow card) 18'; Taylor (yellow card) 20'; Beckie 22' (yellow card) 86'; Ryden 26'; Eloundou 79'	Report	Ochieng 7'; Jakovic (yellow card) 18'; Starikov 58'; Mkosana 66'; Mulligan 77'	Stadium: Hodges Stadium; Attendance: 7,611; Referee: Geoff Gamble

October 28, 2017 Match 16	New York Cosmos	5—2	Puerto Rico FC	Brooklyn, New York
19:30 EDT UTC−4	Ledesma 51', 56', 67'; Mendes 75'; Mkosana 90+5'	Report	Welshman 48', 84'; Soria (yellow card) 89'	Stadium: MCU Park; Attendance: 5,929; Referee: Malik Badawi

=== The Championship ===
November 5, 2017 Semi-Final	Miami FC	0—0 (a.e.t.) (5 - 6 p)	New York Cosmos	Miami, Florida
5:00 PM EST UTC−5	Mares (yellow card) 56'	Report	Calvillo (yellow card) 24'; Ledesma (yellow card) 65'; Mendes (yellow card) 67'; Szetela (yellow card) 103'	Stadium: Riccardo Silva Stadium; Attendance: 7,115; Referee: Marcos de Oliveira
	Penalties
	(penalty missed) Michel; (penalty scored) Poku; (penalty scored) Martínez; (penalty scored) Chavez; (penalty scored) Stefano; (penalty scored) Freeman; (penalty missed) Trafford		(penalty scored) Ayoze; (penalty scored) Szetela; (penalty scored) Calvillo; (penalty scored) Vranjicán; (penalty missed) Guerra; (penalty scored) Mkosana; (penalty scored) Starikov

November 12, 2017 Soccer Bowl	San Francisco Deltas	2—0	New York Cosmos	San Francisco, California
8:00 PM EST UTC−5	Heinemann 19' (pen.) (yellow card) 31'; Gibson (yellow card) 24'; Peiser (yellow card) 90'; Sandoval 90+5'	Report	Mulligan (yellow card) 45+3'; Ayoze (yellow card) 87'	Stadium: Kezar Stadium; Attendance: 9,691; Referee: Rubiel Vazquez

=== U.S. Open Cup ===
==== Match reports ====
May 17, 2017 Round 2	Reading United AC (Pennsylvania)	3—2	(New York (state)) New York Cosmos	Reading, Pennsylvania
7:00 EDT UTC−4	Marie 38'; Micaletto 41'; Pierrot 44'; Adams (yellow card) 59' (yellow-red card) 90+2'; Chanis (yellow card) 73'	NASL Report	Alhassan 11'; Szetela 63'; Márquez (yellow card) 75'	Stadium: Shirk Stadium; Attendance: 347; Referee: Amber O'Connor

== Squad statistics ==
=== Appearances and goals ===
No.	Pos	Nat	Player	Total		NASL Spring Season		NASL Fall Season		NASL Playoffs		U.S. Open Cup	
No.	Pos	Nat	Player	Apps	Goals	Apps	Goals	Apps	Goals	Apps	Goals	Apps	Goals
1	GK	(United States) USA	Jimmy Maurer	28	0	13+0	0	12+0	0	2+0	0	1+0	0
2	DF	(United States) USA	Ryan Richter	25	1	15+1	1	6+3	0	0+0	0	0+0	0
3	DF	(Kenya) KEN	David Ochieng	17	1	7+2	0	6+1	1	0+0	0	1+0	0
4	DF	(United States) USA	Carlos Mendes	21	1	7+1	0	10+0	1	2+0	0	1+0	0
5	DF	(Canada) CAN	Dejan Jakovic	25	1	9+0	0	13+0	1	2+0	0	0+1	0
6	MF	(Spain) ESP	Javi Márquez	30	6	12+1	2	13+1	4	2+0	0	1+0	0
8	MF	(Israel) ISR	Kobi Moyal	10	1	0+0	0	2+7	1	0+1	0	0+0	0
11	MF	(El Salvador) ESA	Andrés Flores	30	2	12+1	1	13+1	1	2+0	0	0+1	0
12	GK	(United States) USA	Kyle Zobeck	2	0	0+0	0	2+0	0	0+0	0	0+0	0
14	MF	(United States) USA	Danny Szetela	24	2	12+3	1	4+3	0	0+1	0	1+0	1
16	MF	(Venezuela) VEN	Juan Francisco Guerra	32	5	14+0	2	13+3	3	2+0	0	0+0	0
17	DF	(Spain) ESP	Ayoze	30	5	11+0	3	15+1	2	2+0	0	0+1	0
18	MF	(Argentina) ARG	Emmanuel Ledesma	21	10	8+1	5	9+1	5	2+0	0	0+0	0
19	FW	(El Salvador) ESA	Irvin Herrera	14	2	6+5	2	1+1	0	0+0	0	1+0	0
21	FW	(Colombia) COL	David Diosa	1	0	0+0	0	0+1	0	0+0	0	0+0	0
22	MF	(Venezuela) VEN	Juan Arango	3	0	0+0	0	1+2	0	0+0	0	0+0	0
23	MF	(El Salvador) ESA	Richard Menjívar	6	0	4+1	0	0+1	0	0+0	0	0+0	0
24	GK	(United States) USA	Brian Holt	5	0	3+0	0	2+0	0	0+0	0	0+0	0
25	DF	(United States) USA	Darrius Barnes	14	0	9+0	0	4+0	0	0+0	0	1+0	0
26	MF	(United States) USA	Eric Calvillo	19	3	2+2	1	11+1	2	2+0	0	1+0	0
27	FW	(Ukraine) UKR	Eugene Starikov	27	4	4+6	0	8+7	4	2+0	0	0+0	0
28	MF	(United States) USA	Jimmy Mulligan	31	1	12+2	0	14+0	1	2+0	0	1+0	0
30	MF	(United States) USA	Salvatore Barone	1	0	0+1	0	0+0	0	0+0	0	0+0	0
31	FW	(Argentina) ARG	Pablo Vranjicán	19	5	3+2	1	10+2	4	0+2	0	0+0	0
32	FW	(Montenegro) MNE	Bljedi Bardic	10	2	0+3	0	5+2	2	0+0	0	0+0	0
37	DF	(England) ENG	Harri Hawkins	1	0	0+0	0	0+1	0	0+0	0	0+0	0
77	FW	(Zimbabwe) ZIM	Lucky Mkosana	11	2	0+0	0	2+7	2	0+2	0	0+0	0
Players who appeared for the New York Cosmos who are no longer at the club:
8	MF	(Italy) ITA	Andrea Mancini	1	0	1+0	0	0+0	0	0+0	0	0+0	0
15	FW	(Italy) ITA	Amauri	3	0	1+2	0	0+0	0	0+0	0	0+0	0
20	MF	(Colombia) COL	Wálter Restrepo	14	2	11+2	2	0+0	0	0+0	0	1+0	0
22	MF	(Ghana) GHA	Kalif Alhassan	6	2	0+5	1	0+0	0	0+0	0	1+0	1
29	DF	(United States) USA	Alexis Velela	1	0	0+1	0	0+0	0	0+0	0	0+0	0

=== Goal scorers ===
Place	Position	Nation	Number	Name	NASL Spring Season	NASL Fall Season	NASL Playoffs	U.S. Open Cup	Total
1	MF	(Argentina)	18	Emmanuel Ledesma	5	5	0	0	10
2	MF	(Spain)	6	Javi Márquez	2	4	0	0	6
3	MF	(Venezuela)	16	Juan Francisco Guerra	2	3	0	0	5
3	DF	(Spain)	17	Ayoze	3	2	0	0	5
3	FW	(Argentina)	31	Pablo Vranjicán	1	4	0	0	5
6	FW	(Ukraine)	27	Eugene Starikov	0	4	0	0	4
7	MF	(United States)	26	Eric Calvillo	1	2	0	0	3
8	MF	(El Salvador)	11	Andrés Flores	1	1	0	0	2
8	MF	(United States)	14	Danny Szetela	1	0	0	1	2
8	FW	(El Salvador)	19	Irvin Herrera	2	0	0	0	2
8	MF	(Colombia)	20	Wálter Restrepo	2	0	0	0	2
8	MF	(Ghana)	22	Kalif Alhassan	1	0	0	1	2
8	FW	(Montenegro)	32	Bljedi Bardic	0	2	0	0	2
8	FW	(Zimbabwe)	77	Lucky Mkosana	0	2	0	0	2
15	DF	(United States)	2	Ryan Richter	1	0	0	0	1
15	DF	(Kenya)	3	David Ochieng	0	1	0	0	1
15	DF	(United States)	4	Carlos Mendes	0	1	0	0	1
15	DF	(Canada)	5	Dejan Jakovic	0	1	0	0	1
15	MF	(Israel)	8	Kobi Moyal	0	1	0	0	1
15	DF	(United States)	28	Jimmy Mulligan	0	1	0	0	1
TOTALS					22	34	0	2	58

=== Own goal scorers ===
Position	Team	Nation	Number	Name	NASL Spring Season	NASL Fall Season	NASL Playoffs	U.S. Open Cup	Total
DF	New York Cosmos	(United States)	2	Ryan Richter	1	0	0	0	1
MF	New York Cosmos	(Venezuela)	16	Juan Francisco Guerra	0	1	0	0	1

=== Disciplinary record ===
Number	Nation	Position	Name	NASL Spring Season		NASL Fall Season		NASL Playoffs		U.S. Open Cup		Total	
Number	Nation	Position	Name	Booked	Sent off (straight red)	Booked	Sent off (straight red)	Booked	Sent off (straight red)	Booked	Sent off (straight red)	Booked	Sent off (straight red)
1	(United States)	GK	Jimmy Maurer	0	0	2	0	0	0	0	0	2	0
2	(United States)	DF	Ryan Richter	3	0	2	0	0	0	0	0	5	0
3	(Kenya)	DF	David Ochieng	3	0	3	0	0	0	0	0	6	0
4	(United States)	DF	Carlos Mendes	1	0	3	0	1	0	0	0	5	0
5	(Canada)	DF	Dejan Jakovic	0	0	3	0	0	0	0	0	3	0
6	(Spain)	MF	Javi Márquez	4	0	0	0	0	0	1	0	5	0
8	(Israel)	MF	Kobi Moyal	0	0	3	0	0	0	0	0	3	0
11	(El Salvador)	MF	Andrés Flores	1	0	1	0	0	0	0	0	2	0
14	(United States)	MF	Danny Szetela	3	0	1	0	1	0	0	0	5	0
16	(Venezuela)	MF	Juan Francisco Guerra	3	1	3	0	0	0	0	0	6	1
17	(Spain)	DF	Ayoze	0	0	4	0	1	0	0	0	5	0
18	(Argentina)	MF	Emmanuel Ledesma	3	0	0	1	1	0	0	0	4	1
20	(Colombia)	MF	Wálter Restrepo	1	0	0	0	0	0	0	0	1	0
22	(Venezuela)	MF	Juan Arango	0	0	1	0	0	0	0	0	1	0
24	(United States)	GK	Brian Holt	1	0	0	0	0	0	0	0	1	0
25	(United States)	DF	Darrius Barnes	1	1	1	0	0	0	0	0	2	1
26	(United States)	MF	Eric Calvillo	1	0	2	0	1	0	0	0	4	0
28	(United States)	MF	Jimmy Mulligan	3	1	2	0	1	0	0	0	6	1
31	(Argentina)	FW	Pablo Vranjicán	0	0	1	0	0	0	0	0	1	0
32	(Montenegro)	FW	Bljedi Bardic	1	0	0	0	0	0	0	0	1	0
			TOTALS	29	3	32	1	6	0	1	0	68	4

=== National Team Call-Ups ===
No.	Pos.	Player	National Team	Competition	Date	Source
11	MF	Andrés Flores	El Salvador	2017 Copa Centroamericana group stage	13-22 January 2017	
11	MF	Andrés Flores	El Salvador	Friendlies	22-26 March 2017	
19	FW	Irvin Herrera	El Salvador	Friendlies	22-26 March 2017	
23	MF	Richard Menjívar	El Salvador	Friendlies	22-26 March 2017	
3	DF	David Ochieng	Kenya	Friendlies	23-26 March 2017	
3	DF	David Ochieng	Kenya	Friendlies	5-12 June 2017	
5	DF	Dejan Jakovic	Canada	Friendlies	5-16 June 2017	
19	FW	Irvin Herrera	El Salvador	Friendlies	11 June 2017	
23	MF	Richard Menjívar	El Salvador	Friendlies	11 June 2017	
5	DF	Dejan Jakovic	Canada	2017 CONCACAF Gold Cup	7-26 July 2017	
11	MF	Andrés Flores	El Salvador	2017 CONCACAF Gold Cup	7-26 July 2017	
19	FW	Irvin Herrera	El Salvador	2017 CONCACAF Gold Cup	7-26 July 2017	
23	MF	Richard Menjívar	El Salvador	2017 CONCACAF Gold Cup	7-26 July 2017	
3	DF	David Ochieng	Kenya	Friendlies	31 August - 2 September 2017	
5	DF	Dejan Jakovic	Canada	Friendlies	2 September 2017	
11	MF	Andrés Flores	El Salvador	Friendlies	8 October 2017	
19	FW	Irvin Herrera	El Salvador	Friendlies	8 October 2017	
23	MF	Richard Menjívar	El Salvador	Friendlies	8 October 2017	
5	DF	Dejan Jakovic	Canada	Friendlies	8 October 2017	

== Transfers ==
=== In ===
No.	Pos.	Player	Transferred from	Fee/notes	Date	Source
16	MF	(Venezuela) Juan Francisco Guerra	(United States) Tampa Bay Rowdies		20 January 2017	
20	MF	(Colombia) Wálter Restrepo	(United States) Philadelphia Union		31 January 2017	
23	MF	(El Salvador) Richard Menjívar	(United States) Rayo OKC		16 February 2017	
15	FW	(Italy) Amauri	(United States) Fort Lauderdale Strikers		21 February 2017	
6	MF	(Spain) Javi Márquez	(Spain) Granada CF	Spring Season; Full Season Extension	24 February 2017; 15 June 2017	
21	FW	(Colombia) David Diosa	(United States) OKC Energy FC		25 February 2017	
27	FW	(Ukraine) Eugene Starikov	(Ukraine) Chornomorets Odesa		17 March 2017	
22	MF	(Ghana) Kalif Alhassan	(United States) Tampa Bay Rowdies		17 March 2017	
5	DF	(Canada) Dejan Jakovic	(Japan) Shimizu S-Pulse		22 March 2017	
18	MF	(Argentina) Emmanuel Ledesma	(Greece) Panetolikos		22 March 2017	
25	DF	(United States) Darrius Barnes	(United States) New England Revolution		24 March 2017	
30	MF	(United States) Salvatore Barone	(United States) Brooklyn Italians		27 March 2017	
31	FW	(Argentina) Pablo Vranjicán	(Malaysia) Pahang FA	Season Long	9 June 2017	
77	FW	(Zimbabwe) Lucky Mkosana	(Finland) IFK Mariehamn		20 June 2017	
8	MF	(Israel) Kobi Moyal	(Israel) Beitar Jerusalem F.C.		21 June 2017	
22	MF	(Venezuela) Juan Arango	(Venezuela) Zulia FC		24 July 2017	

=== Out ===
No.	Pos.	Player	Transferred to	Fee/notes	Date	Source
8	MF	(Italy) Andrea Mancini	(Italy) Free Agent	Released	22 April 2017	
15	FW	(Italy) Amauri	(Italy) Free Agent	Released	22 April 2017	
22	MF	(Ghana) Kalif Alhassan	(Ghana) Free Agent	Mutual Parting	19 July 2017	
20	FW	(Colombia) Wálter Restrepo	(United States) Tampa Bay Rowdies		20 July 2017	

=== Loan in ===
No.	Pos.	Player	Loaned from	Fee/notes	Date	Source
19	FW	(El Salvador) Irvin Herrera	(United States) Saint Louis FC		2 February 2017	

=== Loan out ===
No.	Pos.	Player	Loaned to	Fee/notes	Date	Source
1	GK	(United States) Jimmy Maurer	(United States) FC Dallas	Duration of Gold Cup	19 July 2017	
29	DF	(United States) Alexis Velela	(Spain) C.F. Motril	Through Remainder of Season	26 August 2017	
