= Danny Barrow =

English footballer

Personal information
- Full name: Daniel John Barrow
- Date of birth: 16 November 1995 (age 30)
- Place of birth: Braunton, England
- Height: 5 ft 7 in (1.70 m)
- Position: Midfielder

Team information
- Current team: Penybont
- Number: 24

Youth career
- –2011: Plymouth Argyle
- 2011–2015: West Bromwich Albion

Senior career*
Years	Team	Apps	(Gls)
2015	Bath City	2	(0)
2015	Truro City	2	(0)
2016–2017	Jacksonville Armada	16	(0)
2017	North Carolina	1	(0)
2018–2019	Boavista B	20	(7)
2019–2020	Pedras Rubras	14	(1)
2020–2021	IFK Berga	44	(12)
2022	Oskarshamn	7	(0)
2023	Husqvarna	15	(9)
2023–2026	AC Oulu	42	(3)
2024–2025	Loan → OLS	1	(0)
2026–	Penybont	4	(0)

International career
2010	Wales U17	2	(0)
- * Club domestic league appearances and goals as of 06:23, 10 October 2026 (UTC)

Daniel John Barrow (born 16 November 1995) is a professional footballer who plays as a midfielder for Cymru Premier side Penybont. He has represented Wales at youth international level.

== Career ==
Barrow began his career in the academies of Plymouth Argyle and West Bromwich Albion. Following his release from West Brom, Barrow trained with Major League Soccer side Sporting Kansas City, but wasn't signed by the club.

Barrow had spells with both Bath City and Truro City, before moving to the United States to join NASL side Jacksonville Armada on 18 December 2015.

He made his professional debut on 8 May 2016, in a 0–1 loss to Rayo OKC.

Barrow moved to North Carolina FC on 28 July 2017 in exchange which saw Barrow and Jonathan Glenn head to North Carolina and Brian Shriver to Jacksonville.

After leaving North Carolina at the end of the 2017 season, Barrow was without a club until August 2018, where he joined Portuguese side, Boavista FC.

In August 2023, Barrow joined Veikkausliiga side AC Oulu from Swedish side Husqvarna on a deal until the end of the year.

In September 2026 he moved to Cymru Premier side Penybont.

== Career statistics ==
As of 26 February 2025

Appearances and goals by club, season and competition
Club	Season	League			Cup (Note: Includes US Open Cup, Taça de Portugal and Suomen Cup)		League cup (Note: Includes Finnish League Cup)		Total	
Club	Season	Division	Apps	Goals	Apps	Goals	Apps	Goals	Apps	Goals
Bath City	2015–16	National League South	2	0	0	0	–		2	0
Truro City	2015–16	National League South	2	0	0	0	–		2	0
Jacksonville Armada	2016	NASL	14	0	2	0	–		16	0
Jacksonville Armada	2017	NASL	2	0	1	0	–		3	0
Jacksonville Armada	Total		16	0	3	0	–	–	19	0
North Carolina	2017	NASL	1	0	0	0	–		1	0
Boavista B	2018–19	Divisao Elite Pro-National	20	7	–		–		20	7
Pedras Rubras	2019–20	Campeonato de Portugal	14	1	1	0	–		15	1
IFK Berga	2020	Ettan	17	4	–		–		17	4
IFK Berga	2021	Division 2	27	8	–		–		27	8
IFK Berga	Total		44	12	–	–	–	–	44	12
Oskarshamns AIK	2022	Ettan	7	0	–		–		7	0
Husqvarna	2023	Division 2	15	9	–		–		15	9
AC Oulu	2023	Veikkausliiga	10	1	1	0	0	0	11	1
AC Oulu	2024	Veikkausliiga	22	1	4	0	4	0	30	1
AC Oulu	2025	Veikkausliiga	0	0	0	0	5	1	5	1
AC Oulu	Total		32	2	5	0	9	1	46	3
OLS	2024	Ykkönen	1	0	–		–		1	0
Career total			154	31	9	0	9	1	172	32
