= Kalif Alhassan =

Ghanaian footballer

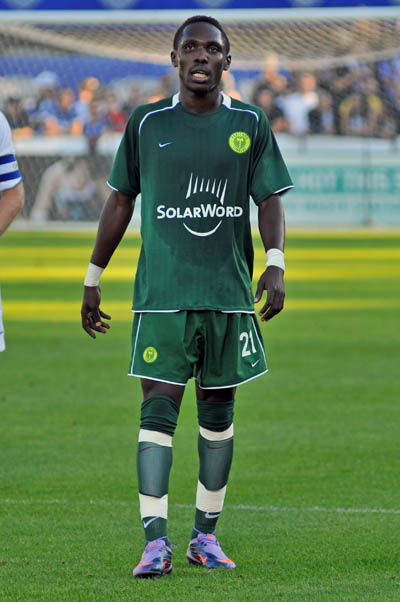
- Alhassan with Portland Timbers in 2010

Personal information
- Full name: Kalif Alhassan
- Date of birth: 15 October 1990 (age 36)
- Place of birth: Accra, Ghana
- Height: 5 ft 10 in (1.78 m)
- Position: Midfielder

Team information
- Current team: PDX

Senior career*
Years	Team	Apps	(Gls)
2007–2010	Liberty Professionals		
2010	Portland Timbers	6	(2)
2011–2014	Portland Timbers	93	(5)
2015	Minnesota United	27	(4)
2016	Tampa Bay Rowdies	17	(0)
2017	New York Cosmos	5	(1)
2017	Dila Gori	2	(0)
2018	Oklahoma City Energy	6	(0)
2019	Minerva Punjab	3	(0)
2019–2020	Churchill Brothers	12	(0)
2021–2022	PDX FC	5	(0)

International career
2007	Ghana U17	5	(1)
2008	Ghana U20	3	(0)
- * Club domestic league appearances and goals as of 3 Decewmber 2024

Kalif Alhassan (born 15 October 1990 in Accra) is a Ghanaian footballer.

== Career ==
=== Professional ===
Alhassan began his career with Ghana Premier League side Liberty Professionals in 2007, helping the club to the semifinals of the 2009 WAFU Club Championship.

In 2010, Alhassan signed with Portland Timbers of the USSF Division 2 Professional League, in hopes of staying with the club in 2011 for their inaugural season in Major League Soccer, the top tier of the United States soccer pyramid. In his first start for the Timbers, Alhassan scored in second-half stoppage time to give Portland a 1–0 victory over Puerto Rico Islanders.

In 2011 Alhassan became the third player in Major League Soccer history to open his career with assists in each of his first three home games, all Timbers wins. He scored his first MLS goal for the Timbers on the opening weekend of the 2012 MLS season, chipping the ball over Philadelphia Union goalkeeper Zac MacMath to seal the Timbers' victory at 3–1. In addition to his goal, Alhassan assisted on another goal and earned the free kick which led to the equalizing goal. For his performance, Alhassan was named Player of the Week for week 1 of the 2012 MLS season, becoming the first Timbers player ever to win the award.

Alhassan played 1,867 minutes in 28 matches in 2015 for Minnesota United FC. On 17 December 2015, Alhassan was released by Minnesota and picked up by the Tampa Bay Rowdies. He then went to play for the New York Cosmos in 2017, but was released in July 2017. In August 2017, Alhassan signed for Dila Gori. In 2019, he moved to India, signing with I-League champions Minerva Academy.

=== International ===
Alhassan began his international career in 2007 with the Ghana U-17 national team. He debuted with the Ghana U-20 national team in 2008 although he did not make the squad for the 2009 FIFA U-20 World Cup, won by Ghana. In May 2008 Alhassan was also called into a camp with the Ghana national team for the 2009 African Nations Championship, again missing out on the final squad.

== Personal ==
Kalif is the son of former Ghana international and two-time Africa Cup of Nations winner George Alhassan.

== Career statistics ==
=== Club ===
As of match played 4 August 2018

Appearances and goals by club, season and competition
Club	Season	League			Cup		Continental		Other		Total	
Club	Season	Division	Apps	Goals	Apps	Goals	Apps	Goals	Apps	Goals	Apps	Goals
Portland Timbers (D2PL)	2010	D2 Pro League	6	2	0	0	–		2	0	8	2
Portland Timbers	2011	MLS	32	0	0	0	–		–		32	0
Portland Timbers	2012	MLS	16	1	1	0	–		–		17	1
Portland Timbers	2013	MLS	30	3	3	0	–		4	0	37	3
Portland Timbers	2014	MLS	15	1	2	0	3	1	–		20	2
Portland Timbers	Total		93	5	6	0	3	1	4	0	106	6
Minnesota United (NASL)	2015	NASL	27	4	0	0	–		1	0	28	4
Tampa Bay Rowdies	2016	NASL	17	0	1	0	–		–		18	0
New York Cosmos	2017	NASL	5	1	1	1	–		–		6	2
Dila Gori	2017	Erovnuli Liga	2	0	0	0	–		–		2	0
OKC Energy	2018	USL	6	0	0	0	–		–		6	0
Career total			156	12	8	1	3	1	7	0	174	14
