= Michael O'Sullivan (soccer) =

English-American soccer player

Mike O'Sullivan
Personal information
- Full name: Michael O'Sullivan
- Date of birth: February 18, 1995 (age 31)
- Place of birth: Romford, England
- Height: 1.88 m (6 ft 2 in)
- Position: Defender

Youth career
- 2013: Orlando City

College career
Years	Team	Apps	(Gls)
2013	Eastern Florida State Titans		
2014–2016	Palm Beach Atlantic Sailfish	54	(5)

Senior career*
Years	Team	Apps	(Gls)
2015	Orlando City U-23	12	(0)
2016	Kraze United	3	(1)
2016	South Florida Surf	1	(0)
2017	Jacksonville Armada	2	(0)
2018	Palm Beach United	5	(0)
2019–2020	South Georgia Tormenta	7	(0)
- * Club domestic league appearances and goals as of October 25, 2020

Michael O'Sullivan (born February 18, 1995) is an English-American soccer player.

== Career ==
=== College and amateur ===
O'Sullivan played four years of college soccer; one year at Eastern Florida State College in 2013 before transferring to Palm Beach Atlantic University in 2014.

During his time at college, O'Sullivan played with Premier Development League sides Orlando City U-23 and South Florida Surf.

=== Professional ===
O'Sullivan signed with NASL club Jacksonville Armada FC on February 14, 2017 He made his league debut for the club on May 6, 2017, coming on as an 87th-minute substitute for J. C. Banks in a 1–1 draw with the New York Cosmos.

After a season with Palm Beach United of the National Premier Soccer League, O'Sullivan signed with USL League One side Tormenta FC. He made his league debut for the club on May 25, 2019, coming on for Jad Arslan in the 75th minute of a 0–0 draw with Lansing Ignite FC.
