= Renan Gorne =

Brazilian footballer

Personal information
- Full name: Renan Gorne Silva
- Date of birth: 22 February 1996 (age 30)
- Place of birth: Rio de Janeiro, Brazil
- Height: 1.82 m (6 ft 0 in)
- Position: Forward

Youth career
- 2011–2016: Botafogo

Senior career*
Years	Team	Apps	(Gls)
2017–2019	Botafogo	1	(0)
2017	→ North Carolina FC (loan)	12	(6)
2018	→ Paysandu (loan)	8	(1)
2019	→ Volta Redonda (loan)	2	(0)
2019	→ Confiança (loan)	20	(3)
2020	Confiança	36	(9)
2021	Remo	38	(9)
2022	Confiança	26	(13)
2022	Khaitan	9	(3)
2023	Novorizontino	17	(4)
2023	América de Natal	4	(0)
2023–2024	Portuguesa	2	(0)
- * Club domestic league appearances and goals as of 22:06, 21 February 2024 (UTC)

Renan Gorne Silva (born 22 February 1996) is a Brazilian footballer who plays as a forward.

== Career ==
Born in Rio de Janeiro, Gorne joined Botafogo's youth setup in 2011. On 4 November 2016, after scoring 31 goals with the under-20 side during the season, he renewed his contract until 2019 and was promoted to the first team.

Gorne made his first team – and Série A – debut on 11 June 2017, coming on as a late substitute for Roger in a 2–2 home draw against Coritiba. On 3 August, however, he was loaned to North American Soccer League side North Carolina FC until the end of the year.

Upon returning, Gorne served loans at Paysandu, Volta Redonda and Confiança, helping the latter in their promotion from the Série C; on 9 December 2019, he also signed a permanent deal with Dragão.

On 8 February 2021, Gorne was announced at Remo also in the second level. He returned to Confiança on 24 December, but left for Kuwaiti Division One side Khaitan SC in August 2022.

Gorne returned to his home country on 13 January 2023, after agreeing to a contract with Novorizontino. He was announced at América de Natal on 26 May, but featured rarely and moved to Portuguesa on 6 September.

== Career statistics ==
As of 21 February 2024

Club	Season	League			State League		Cup		Continental		Other		Total	
Club	Season	Division	Apps	Goals	Apps	Goals	Apps	Goals	Apps	Goals	Apps	Goals	Apps	Goals
Botafogo	2017	Série A	1	0	0	0	0	0	—		—		1	0
North Carolina FC (loan)	2017	NASL	12	6	—		—		—		1 (Note: Appearance(s) in NASL Playoffs)	0	13	6
Paysandu (loan)	2018	Série B	4	0	4	1	1	0	—		1 (Note: Appearance(s) in Copa Verde)	0	10	1
Volta Redonda (loan)	2019	Série C	0	0	2	0	—		—		—		2	0
Confiança	2019	Série C	20	3	—		—		—		1 (Note: Appearance(s) in Copa do Nordeste)	1	21	4
Confiança	2020	Série B	28	7	8	2	—		—		5	1	41	10
Confiança	Total		48	10	8	2	—		—		6	2	62	14
Remo	2021	Série B	26	5	12	4	4	0	—		2	0	44	9
Confiança	2022	Série C	14	2	12	11	—		—		—		26	13
Khaitan	2022–23	Kuwaiti Division One	9	3	—		2	5	—		—		11	8
Novorizontino	2023	Série B	0	0	17	4	—		—		—		17	4
América de Natal	2023	Série C	4	0	—		—		—		—		4	0
Portuguesa	2023	Paulista	—		—		—		—		2 (Note: Appearance(s) in Copa Paulista)	0	2	0
Portuguesa	2024	Paulista	—		2	0	—		—		—		2	0
Portuguesa	Total		—		2	0	—		—		2	0	4	0
Career total			118	26	57	22	7	5	0	0	12	2	194	55

== Honours ==
Paysandu

- Copa Verde: 2018

Confiança

- Campeonato Sergipano: 2020

Remo

- Copa Verde: 2021
