= Zach Steinberger =

American soccer player (born 1992)

Personal information
- Full name: Zachary Wolfgang Steinberger
- Date of birth: May 10, 1992 (age 34)
- Place of birth: Long Beach, California, United States
- Height: 1.80 m (5 ft 11 in)
- Positions: Midfielder; forward

Youth career
- 2000–2003: Orange County Pateadores FC
- 2003–2005: West Coast FC
- 2005–2007: Irvine Strikers FC
- 2007–2009: IMG Academy
- 2009: MFK Košice
- 2010–2011: Karlsruher SC

College career
Years	Team	Apps	(Gls)
2011–2014	Butler Bulldogs	65	(14)

Senior career*
Years	Team	Apps	(Gls)
2012–2014	Michigan Bucks	41	(21)
2015–2016	Houston Dynamo	3	(0)
2015	→ Indy Eleven (loan)	12	(2)
2016	→ Rio Grande Valley FC (loan)	4	(0)
2016	→ Jacksonville Armada (loan)	20	(4)
2017	Jacksonville Armada	32	(8)
2018	Indy Eleven	17	(1)
2018	→ North Carolina FC (loan)	10	(4)
2019–2021	Tampa Bay Rowdies	50	(3)
- * Club domestic league appearances and goals as of November 4, 2021

Zach Steinberger (born May 10, 1992) is an American former professional soccer player.

== Career ==
=== Youth and college ===
Growing up in Southern California, Steinberger spent time with various youth soccer teams in the area before joining IMG Academy in Bradenton, Florida. He then tried his luck in Europe, spending time in the youth ranks for Slovak club MFK Košice and German side Karlsruher SC.

After two years in Europe, Steinbgerger returned to the States to play college soccer. Steinberger spent his entire college career at Butler University between 2011 and 2014, where he made 65 appearances, scored 14 goals, and had 15 assists for the Bulldogs. He was named 2013 First Team All-Big East and 2013 Big East All-Tournament.

While at Butler, Steinberger also played for the Michigan Bucks in the Premier Development League between 2012 and 2014.

=== Professional ===
==== Houston Dynamo ====
On January 15, 2015, Steinberger was selected in the first round (8th overall) of the 2015 MLS SuperDraft by the Houston Dynamo. He made his professional debut on March 28, coming on as a 69th-minute substitute during a 0–0 draw against the Colorado Rapids. He got his first start for the Dynamo on June 17 in a 2–0 win over the Austin Aztex in a U.S. Open Cup match. During his first season as a pro, Steinberger made 3 MLS and 3 Open Cup appearances for the Dynamo.

Steinberger also spent time on loan with NASL club Indy Eleven during 2015. He made his debut for Indy on August 1 in a 0–0 draw with the Atlanta Silverbacks. On September 5, Steinberger scored twice in a 3–0 win over the Jacksonville Armada. He ended his time on loan with Indy having scored twice from 12 appearances.

The 2016 season saw Steinberger make only 1 Open Cup appearance for the Dynamo, spending most of the year on loan. He made 4 appearances for Houston's USL affiliate Rio Grande Valley FC before being loaned to NASL club Jacksonville Armada on June 29. He made his debut for Jacksonville on July 2, scoring once in a 1–1 draw with the Tampa Bay Rowdies. On October 30, Steinberger scored once and had 2 assists to help the Armada defeat Tampa Bay 3–2 in the final game of the season. He scored 4 goals and had 4 assists from 20 appearances during his time on loan in jacksonville.

On November 28, 2016, Steinberger had his contract option declined by Houston.

==== Jacksonville Armada ====
On February 17, 2017, Steinberger signed with Jacksonville Armada. He scored his first goal of the season on April 8 to give the Armada a 1–0 win over FC Edmonton. On May 7, Steinberger scored off a volley in the 95th minute to give Jacksonville a 1–1 draw with the New York Cosmos. The goal was later named NASL Goal of the year. He scored twice and added an assist on May 20 to help the Armada beat the San Francisco Deltas 3–0. In Jacksonville's next game, Steinberger scored another brace to beat North Carolina FC 2–1. He ended the season with 8 goals and 1 assists from 32 appearances in NASL play.

==== Indy Eleven ====
Steinberger signed with USL side Indy Eleven for the 2018 season on January 31, 2018. On March 24, in the opening game of the season, Steinberger started and played the full 90 in a 1–0 win over the Richmond Kickers. He scored his first goal of the season on May 19 in a 2–1 loss to Bethlehem Steel. Steinberger made 17 appearances, scored 1 goal, and had 1 assist in league play for Indy during the 2018 season.

On August 24, 2018, Steinberger was loaned to USL team North Carolina FC for the remainder of the 2018 season. He made his debut for NCFC on August 25, scoring twice and adding an assist in a 6–2 victory over the Charlotte Independence. He scored 4 goals and had 3 assists in 10 appearances for North Carolina as they finished 9th in the Eastern Conference, missing out on the USL Playoffs by 2 points.

==== Tampa Bay Rowdies ====
On December 5, 2018, Steinberger joined USL Championship side Tampa Bay Rowdies. He made his Rowdies debut on March 9 in a 1–0 win over Memphis 901. Steinberger scored his first goal for Tampa Bay on March 16 in a 2–0 victory against the Pittsburgh Riverhounds. He ended the USL regular season with 21 appearances, 3 goals, and 2 assists, helping the Rowdies finish 5th in the Eastern Conference and qualify for the playoffs. Steinberger came off the bench in Tampa Bay's only playoff game, a 2–1 loss to Louisville City. In Open Cup play, Steinberger had 1 goal and 2 assists from 2 appearances.

During a shortened 2020 regular season due to the COVID-19 pandemic, Steinberger made 8 appearances and had 2 assists to help Tampa Bay qualify for the playoffs. On October 10, Steinberger recorded an assist in a 4–2 win over Birmingham Legion in the Conference quarterfinals. In the Conference semifinal, he set up Lucky Mkosana in the 79th minute to give the Rowdies a 1–0 win against the Charleston Battery. Steinberger scored on October 24 to help Tampa Bay defeat Louisville City 2–1 in the Conference final. The USL Championship Final was cancelled due to multiple Rowdies players and staff testing positive for COVID-19.

Following the 2021 season it was announced that Steinberger would leave the Rowdies. Steinberger announced his retirement from professional soccer in February 2022.

== Career statistics ==
As of February 9, 2021

Club	Season	League			Open Cup		Playoffs		Continental		Total	
Club	Season	Division	Apps	Goals	Apps	Goals	Apps	Goals	Apps	Goals	Apps	Goals
Michigan Bucks	2012	PDL	16	6	2	0	0	0	—		18	6
Michigan Bucks	2013	PDL	13	10	0	0	0	0	—		13	10
Michigan Bucks	2014	PDL	12	5	0	0	0	0	—		12	5
Michigan Bucks	Bucks Total		41	21	2	0	0	0	0	0	43	21
Houston Dynamo	2015	MLS	3	0	3	0	—		—		6	0
Houston Dynamo	2016	MLS	0	0	1	0	—		—		1	0
Houston Dynamo	Dynamo Total		3	0	4	0	0	0	0	0	7	0
Indy Eleven (loan)	2015	NASL	12	2	0	0	—		—		12	2
Rio Grande Valley FC (loan)	2016	USL	4	0	—		0	0	—		4	0
Jacksonville Armada (loan)	2016	NASL	20	4	0	0	—		—		20	4
Jacksonville Armada	2017	NASL	32	8	1	0	—		—		33	8
Jacksonville Armada	Armada Total		52	12	1	0	0	0	0	0	53	12
Indy Eleven	2018	USL	17	1	1	0	0	0	—		18	1
North Carolina FC (loan)	2018	USL	10	4	0	0	—		—		10	4
Tampa Bay Rowdies	2019	USLC	21	3	2	1	1	0	—		24	4
Tampa Bay Rowdies	2020	USLC	8	0	—		3	1	—		11	1
Tampa Bay Rowdies	Rowdies Total		29	3	2	1	4	1	0	0	35	5
Career Total			168	43	10	1	4	1	0	0	182	45
