= 2016 Jacksonville Armada FC season =

Jacksonville Armada
2016 season
- Owner: Mark Frisch
- Head coach: Tony Meola
- Stadium: Community First Park
- NASL: Spring: 10; Fall: 11; Combined: 11
- U.S. Open Cup: Fourth Round vs Orlando City
- Top goalscorer: League: Alhassane Keita & Charles Eloundou (6); All: Alhassane Keita (7)
- Highest home attendance: 5,313 (May 7 vs. OKC)
- Lowest home attendance: League: 3,517 (May 4 vs. Edmonton); All: 1,200 (Jun. 1 vs. Charleston at Southern Oak Stadium)
- Average home league attendance: League: 4,473; All: 3,675
Home colors	Away colors

The 2016 Jacksonville Armada FC season was the club's second season of existence. The club played in the North American Soccer League, the second tier of the American soccer pyramid.

== Roster ==
As of match played 30 October 2016

No.	Name	Nationality	Position	Date of birth (age)	Signed from	Signed in	Contract ends	Apps.	Goals
Goalkeepers
1	Miguel Gallardo	(Mexico)	GK	24 October 1984 (age 42)	Orlando City	2015		46	0
23	Sean Lewis	(United States)	GK	17 April 1992 (age 34)	(Australia) Olympia	2016		11	0
Defenders
2	Tyler Ruthven	(United States)	DF	18 July 1988 (age 38)	Arizona United	2016		32	1
4	Mechack Jérôme	(Haiti)	DF	21 April 1990 (age 36)	Charlotte Independence	2015		32	2
5	Beto Navarro	(United States)	DF	25 March 1989 (age 37)	Orange County Blues	2016		13	0
7	Bryan Burke	(United States)	DF	3 January 1989 (age 37)	Louisville City	2016		21	0
13	Matt Bahner	(United States)	DF	12 March 1990 (age 36)	Harrisburg City Islanders	2015		46	3
29	Patrick Otte	(Netherlands)	DF	22 October 1991 (age 35)	Ventura County Fusion	2016		11	1
52	Karl Ouimette	(Canada)	DF	18 June 1992 (age 34)	on loan from (United States) New York Red Bulls	2016	2016	7	0
Midfielders
3	Anthony Wallace	(United States)	MF	26 January 1989 (age 37)	New York Red Bulls	2016		17	0
6	Nicklas Maripuu	(Sweden)	MF	2 March 1992 (age 34)	(Sweden) IK Sirius	2016		14	0
8	Pekka Lagerblom	(Finland)	MF	19 October 1982 (age 44)	(Finland) Lahti	2016		10	0
16	Lucas Scaglia	(Argentina)	MF	6 May 1987 (age 39)	(Croatia) Rijeka	2015		42	2
17	Nicolás Perea	(Colombia)	MF	1 August 1992 (age 34)	K-W United	2015		24	0
18	Jason Plumhoff	(Germany)	MF	9 August 1991 (age 35)	Edmonton	2016		5	0
19	Kevan George	(Trinidad and Tobago)	MF	30 January 1990 (age 36)	Columbus Crew	2016		30	0
20	Danny Barrow	(Wales)	MF	16 November 1995 (age 30)	Truro City	2016		16	0
21	Alex Dixon	(United States)	MF	7 February 1990 (age 36)	Rochester Rhinos	2016		16	2
25	Zach Steinberger	(United States)	MF	10 May 1992 (age 34)	loan from (United States) Houston Dynamo	2016	2016	20	4
33	Garry Lewis	(United States)	MF	26 August 1986 (age 40)		2016		0	0
Forwards
9	Alexander Andersson	(Sweden)	FW	14 December 1985 (age 40)	(Sweden) Degerfors IF	2016		4	0
10	Alhassane Keita	(Guinea)	FW	26 June 1983 (age 43)	(Switzerland) St. Gallen	2015		44	14
11	Jemal Johnson	(United States)	FW	3 May 1985 (age 41)	New York Cosmos	2015		52	7
24	Chaim Roserie	(Canada)	FW	9 September 1998 (age 28)		2015		0	0
27	Derek Gebhard	(United States)	FW	15 October 1995 (age 31)	Jacksonville United	2015		17	0
99	Charles Eloundou	(Cameroon)	FW	4 December 1994 (age 31)	Colorado Rapids	2016		31	6
Left during the season
6	Richie Ryan	(Republic of Ireland)	MF	6 January 1985 (age 41)	Ottawa Fury	2016		5	0
9	Matthew Fondy	(United States)	FW	28 June 1989 (age 37)	Louisville City	2016		9	0
12	Junior Sandoval	(Honduras)	MF	13 October 1990 (age 36)	(Colombia) Jaguares de Córdoba	2016		18	2
14	Pascal Millien	(Haiti)	MF	3 May 1986 (age 40)	(Italy) Fidelis Andria	2015		39	7
15	Shawn Nicklaw	(Guam)	DF	15 April 1989 (age 37)	(Iceland) Þór Akureyri	2015		31	0
22	Sebastian Evers	(Guam)	GK	2 January 1991 (age 35)		2016		1	0

=== Staff ===
- (United States) Tony Meola – Head Coach
- (England) Mark Lowry – Assistant Coach

== Transfers ==
=== Winter ===
In: Note: Flags indicate national team as defined under FIFA eligibility rules; some limited exceptions apply. Players may hold more than one non-FIFA nationality.

No.	Pos.	Nation	Player
2	DF	USA	Tyler Ruthven (from (United States) Arizona United)
5	DF	USA	Beto Navarro (from (United States) Orange County Blues)
6	MF	IRL	Richie Ryan (from (Canada) Ottawa Fury)
7	DF	USA	Bryan Burke (from (United States) Louisville City)
8	MF	FIN	Pekka Lagerblom (from (Finland) Lahti)
9	FW	USA	Matthew Fondy (from (United States) Louisville City)
12	MF	HON	Junior Sandoval (from (Colombia) Jaguares de Córdoba)
19	MF	TTO	Kevan George (from (United States) Columbus Crew)
20	MF	WAL	Danny Barrow (from (England) Truro City)
21	MF	USA	Alex Dixon (from (United States) Rochester Rhinos)
23	GK	USA	Sean Lewis (from (Australia) Olympia)
29	DF	NED	Patrick Otte (from (United States) Ventura County Fusion)
33	MF	USA	Garry Lewis
99	FW	CMR	Charles Eloundou (from (United States) Colorado Rapids)

Out: Note: Flags indicate national team as defined under FIFA eligibility rules; some limited exceptions apply. Players may hold more than one non-FIFA nationality.

No.	Pos.	Nation	Player
2	DF	USA	Jordan Gafa
3	DF	ARG	Lucas Trejo
5	DF	BIH	Nurdin Hrustic
6	DF	ARG	Fabricio Ortiz
7	MF	ARG	Lucas Rodríguez
8	MF	ARG	Bochy Hoyos
9	MF	ARG	Marcos Flores (to (Chile) Curicó Unido)
12	GK	ESP	David Sierra (to (United States) Miami)
18	FW	CRO	Tommy Križanović
19	MF	USA	Nico Zaldana
20	DF	SLE	Joseph Toby
21	MF	IRI	Ramak Safi
23	MF	COL	Jaime Castrillón (to (Colombia) Atlético Bucaramanga)
25	FW	USA	Tyler Williams
26	FW	JAM	Akeil Barrett (to (Sweden) Piteå IF)

=== Summer ===
In: Note: Flags indicate national team as defined under FIFA eligibility rules; some limited exceptions apply. Players may hold more than one non-FIFA nationality.

No.	Pos.	Nation	Player
3	MF	USA	Anthony Wallace (from (United States) New York Red Bulls)
6	MF	SWE	Nicklas Maripuu (from (Sweden) IK Sirius)
9	FW	SWE	Alexander Andersson (from (Sweden) Degerfors IF)
18	MF	GER	Jason Plumhoff (traded from (Canada) Edmonton)
25	MF	USA	Zach Steinberger (loan from (United States) Houston Dynamo)
52	DF	CAN	Karl Ouimette (loan from (United States) New York Red Bulls)

Out: Note: Flags indicate national team as defined under FIFA eligibility rules; some limited exceptions apply. Players may hold more than one non-FIFA nationality.

No.	Pos.	Nation	Player
6	MF	IRL	Richie Ryan (to (United States) Miami)
9	FW	USA	Matthew Fondy (to (United States) Carolina RailHawks)
12	MF	HON	Junior Sandoval (to (United States) Fort Lauderdale Strikers)
14	MF	HAI	Pascal Millien (to (United States) Fort Lauderdale Strikers)
15	DF	GUM	Shawn Nicklaw (traded to (Canada) Edmonton)
22	GK	USA	Sebastian Evers (to (United States) Miami)

== Friendlies ==
January 31, 2016 Scrimmage	Jacksonville Armada	2–5	New York Red Bulls	Orlando
10:30 EST (UTC−5)	Keita 12'; Barrow 50'	Summary	B. Wright-Phillips 27' (pen.); Kljestan 45'; Grella 57'; Bonomo 67'; Lade 85'

February 6, 2016	Jacksonville Armada	1–0	Philadelphia Union	Jacksonville
18:00 EST (UTC−5)	Eloundou 80'	Report		Stadium: Community First Park

February 13, 2016	Jacksonville Armada	2–1	Orlando City	Jacksonville
18:00 EST (UTC−5)	Jérôme; Keita 58'	Report	Kaká 31'	Stadium: Community First Park

February 24, 2016	Jacksonville Armada	0–0	North Florida Ospreys	Jacksonville
19:30 EST (UTC−5)		Report		Stadium: Hodges Stadium

February 27, 2016	Jacksonville Armada	1–5	New York Red Bulls	Jacksonville
18:00 EST (UTC−5)	Eloundou 84'	Report	Verón 23', 60', 61'; Baah 28'; Davis 83'	Stadium: Community First Park

March 3, 2016	Jacksonville Armada	2–3	Tulsa Roughnecks	Jacksonville
12:30 EST (UTC−5)	Millien 54'; Eloundou 73'	Report	Ochoa 9', 66'; Mata 49'	Stadium: Patton Park

March 5, 2016	Jacksonville Armada	0–0	Charleston Battery	Jacksonville
12:30 EST (UTC−5)		Report		Stadium: Patton Park

March 9, 2016	Miami	1–2	Jacksonville Armada	Miami Gardens
11:00 EST (UTC−5)	Campos 45' (pen.)	Report	Sandoval 2'; Bahner (yellow card) 52'; Johnson 89' (pen.)	Stadium: St. Thomas University

March 15, 2016	Jacksonville Dolphins	0–3	Jacksonville Armada	Jacksonville
19:30 EST (UTC−5)		Report	Fondy 7', 14'; Dixon 46'	Stadium: Southern Oak Stadium

March 18, 2016	Jacksonville Armada	1–3	Rayo OKC	Jacksonville
10:00 EST (UTC−5)	Eloundou 56'; Ryan (yellow card) 74'	Report	Menjivar 19', 36'; Svantesson 87'	Stadium: Patton Park

April 2, 2016	Jacksonville Armada	Cancelled	Flagler Saints	St. Augustine
11:00 EDT (UTC−4)		Summary		Stadium: Saints Field
Note: Cancelled due to inclement weather.

== Competitions ==
=== NASL Spring season ===
==== Standings ====
Pos	Team	Pld	W	D	L	GF	GA	GD	Pts	Qualification
1	Indy Eleven (S)	10	4	6	0	15	8	+7	18	Playoffs
2	New York Cosmos	10	6	0	4	15	8	+7	18	
3	FC Edmonton	10	5	2	3	9	7	+2	17	
4	Minnesota United	10	5	1	4	16	12	+4	16	
5	Tampa Bay Rowdies	10	4	4	2	11	9	+2	16	
6	Fort Lauderdale Strikers	10	4	3	3	12	12	0	15	
7	Carolina RailHawks	10	4	2	4	11	13	−2	14	
8	Rayo OKC	10	3	3	4	11	12	−1	12	
9	Ottawa Fury	10	2	3	5	9	14	−5	9	
10	Jacksonville Armada	10	1	4	5	5	11	−6	7	
11	Miami FC	10	1	4	5	7	15	−8	7	

Source: NASL
Rules for classification: 1) points; 2) total goal differential; 3) total goals scored; 4) head-to-head record; 5) away goal differential; 6) away goals scored
(S) Spring season champion

==== Results summary ====
Overall								Home						Away					
Pld	W	D	L	GF	GA	GD	Pts	W	D	L	GF	GA	GD	W	D	L	GF	GA	GD
10	1	4	5	5	11	−6	7	1	2	2	4	5	−1	0	2	3	1	6	−5

Last updated: 11 June 2016.
Source: Match reports

==== Results by round ====
Round	1	2	3	4	5	6	7	8	9	10
Stadium	A	H	A	H	H	A	A	H	A	H
Result	L	W	D	L	L	L	L	D	D	D
Position	11	6	7	8	10	10	10	11	11	10

Updated to match(es) played on 11 June 2016. Source: Match reports
A = Away; H = Home; W = Win; D = Draw; L = Loss

==== Matches ====
April 9, 2016 1	New York Cosmos	2–0	Jacksonville Armada	Hempstead
EST (UTC−5)	Arrieta 29' (yellow card) 90+3'; Moffat 55'	Summary	Keita (yellow card) 45+1'	Stadium: James M. Shuart Stadium; Attendance: 3,685

April 15, 2016 2	Jacksonville Armada	2–1	Miami	Jacksonville
19:00 EST (UTC−5)	Sandoval 20'; Ruthven (yellow card) 25'; Millien 36'; George (yellow card) 57'; Eloundou (yellow card) 73'	Summary	Cvitanich 26' (yellow card) 39'; Vega (yellow card) 90+3'	Stadium: Community First Park; Attendance: 5,112; Referee: Sorin Stoica

April 23, 2016 3	Fort Lauderdale Strikers	1–1	Jacksonville Armada	Fort Lauderdale
19:00 EST (UTC−5)	Alexandre (yellow card) 36' (yellow-red card) 55'; Attakora (yellow card) 39'; Maicon Santos 74' (yellow card) 90+2'	Summary	Bahner 16'; George (yellow card) 27'; Ryan (yellow card) 81'	Stadium: Lockhart Stadium; Attendance: 1,097; Referee: Baboucarr Jallow

May 4, 2016 4	Jacksonville Armada	0–1	Edmonton	Jacksonville
18:30 EST (UTC−5)	George (yellow card) 23'; Keita (yellow card) 85'; Eloundou (yellow card) 90+3'	Summary	Edward (yellow card) 26'; Diakité 64'; Van Oekel (yellow card) 87'	Stadium: Community First Park; Attendance: 3,517; Referee: Rosendo Mendoza

May 7, 2016 5	Jacksonville Armada	0–1	Rayo OKC	Jacksonville
19:00 EST (UTC−5)		Summary	Fernandes (yellow card) 53'; Findley 70'	Stadium: Community First Park; Attendance: 5,313; Referee: Marcos De Oliveira

May 14, 2016 6	Minnesota United	2–0	Jacksonville Armada	Blaine
20:00 EST (UTC−5)	Venegas 16'; Stefano 28'	Summary	Perea (yellow card) 74'; Eloundou (yellow card) 82'; Johnson (yellow card) 86'	Stadium: National Sports Center; Attendance: 8,861; Referee: Geoff Gamble

May 21, 2016 7	Ottawa Fury	1–0	Jacksonville Armada	Ottawa
14:00 EST (UTC−5)	Alves (yellow card) 53'; Obasi (yellow card) 59' de Jong 88'	Summary	Keita (yellow card) 90+1'	Stadium: TD Place Stadium; Attendance: 5,550; Referee: Yusri Rudolf

May 28, 2016 8	Jacksonville Armada	1–1	Indy Eleven	Jacksonville
19:00 EST (UTC−5)	Bahner 30' (yellow card) 63'	Summary	Miller (yellow card) 28'; Paterson (yellow card) 41'; Vuković (yellow card) 70'; Braun 73'	Stadium: Baseball Grounds of Jacksonville; Attendance: 4,412; Referee: Sorin Stoica

June 3, 2016 9	Carolina RailHawks	0–0	Jacksonville Armada	Cary
20:55 EST (UTC−5)		Summary	Keita (yellow card) 61'	Stadium: WakeMed Soccer Park; Attendance: 5,786; Referee: Alejandro Mariscal

June 11, 2016 10	Jacksonville Armada	1–1	Tampa Bay Rowdies	Jacksonville
16:00 EST (UTC−5)	Nicklaw (red card) 46'; Sandoval 52'; Navarro (yellow card) 89'	Summary	Sweat (yellow card) 12'; Burgos 84'	Stadium: Community First Park; Attendance: 4,013; Referee: Mark Kadlecik

=== NASL Fall season ===
==== Standings ====
Pos	Team	Pld	W	D	L	GF	GA	GD	Pts	Qualification
1	New York Cosmos (F)	22	14	5	3	44	21	+23	47	Playoffs
2	Indy Eleven	22	11	4	7	36	25	+11	37	
3	FC Edmonton	22	10	6	6	16	14	+2	36	
4	Rayo OKC	22	9	8	5	28	21	+7	35	
5	Miami FC	22	9	6	7	31	27	+4	33	
6	Fort Lauderdale Strikers	22	7	5	10	19	28	−9	26	
7	Carolina RailHawks	22	7	5	10	25	35	−10	26	
8	Minnesota United	22	6	7	9	25	25	0	25	
9	Puerto Rico	22	5	9	8	19	31	−12	24	
10	Tampa Bay Rowdies	22	5	8	9	29	32	−3	23	
11	Jacksonville Armada	22	5	8	9	25	35	−10	23	
12	Ottawa Fury	22	5	7	10	23	26	−3	22	

Source: NASL
Rules for classification: 1) points; 2) total goal differential; 3) total goals scored; 4) head-to-head record; 5) away goal differential; 6) away goals scored
(F) Fall season champion

==== Results summary ====
Overall								Home						Away					
Pld	W	D	L	GF	GA	GD	Pts	W	D	L	GF	GA	GD	W	D	L	GF	GA	GD
22	5	8	9	25	35	−10	23	3	6	2	14	15	−1	2	2	7	11	20	−9

Last updated: 22 November 2016.
Source: Match reports

==== Results by round ====
Round	1	2	3	4	5	6	7	8	9	10	11	12	13	14	15	16	17	18	19	20	21	22
Stadium	A	H	A	A	H	A	A	H	A	H	H	A	A	A	H	H	A	H	H	H	A	H
Result	D	W	L	L	L	L	L	D	W	D	D	L	L	D	D	D	W	D	L	W	L	W
Position	6	2	5	9	10	12	12	11	10	9	9	11	11	12	12	12	12	12	12	12	12	11

Updated to match(es) played on 22 November 2016. Source: Match reports
A = Away; H = Home; W = Win; D = Draw; L = Loss

==== Matches ====
2 July 2016 1	Tampa Bay Rowdies	1–1	Jacksonville Armada	St. Petersburg
19:30 EST (UTC−5)	Hristov 13'; Guerra (yellow card) 90+2'	Summary	Steinberger 12'; Ruthven (yellow card) 45+2'; Navarro (yellow card) 76'; Scaglia (yellow card) 90'	Stadium: Al Lang Stadium; Attendance: 7,690; Referee: Luis Guardia

9 July 2016 2	Jacksonville Armada	2–1	Puerto Rico	Jacksonville
19:00 EST (UTC−5)	Johnson 9' (yellow card) 40'; Dixon 27'; Jérôme (yellow card) 78'	Summary	Nurse (yellow card) 70'; Ramos 78'	Stadium: Community First Park; Attendance: 5,134; Referee: Kevin Terry

13 July 2016 3	New York Cosmos	3–0	Jacksonville Armada	Hempstead
19:30 EST (UTC−5)	Flores 27'; Maurer (yellow card) 33'; Diosa 36'; Moffat 79'; Szetela (yellow card) 81'	Summary	Johnson (yellow card) 32'	Stadium: James M. Shuart Stadium; Attendance: 3,827; Referee: Mathieu Bourdeau

16 July 2016 4	Miami	1–0	Jacksonville Armada	Miami
20:00 EST (UTC−5)	Trafford (yellow card) 14'; Ryan (yellow card) 25'; Chavez 90+2'	Summary	Navarro (red card) 11'; Wallace (yellow card) 61'; George (yellow card) 65'; Lewis (yellow card) 90+1'	Stadium: FIU Stadium; Attendance: 3,627; Referee: Younes Marrakchi

23 July 2016 5	Jacksonville Armada	0–2	Ottawa Fury	Jacksonville
17:00 EST (UTC−5)		Summary	Stewart 37'; Haworth 60'; Eustáquio (yellow card) 86'	Stadium: Community First Park; Attendance: 3,411; Referee: Rubiel Vazquez

30 July 2016 6	Fort Lauderdale Strikers	1–0	Jacksonville Armada	Fort Lauderdale
19:00 EST (UTC−5)	James (yellow card) 71'; Agbossoumonde (yellow card) 81'; Santos 88'	Summary	Scaglia (yellow card) 59'	Stadium: Lockhart Stadium; Attendance: 1,158; Referee: Tyler Ploeger

3 August 2016 7	Indy Eleven	5–2	Jacksonville Armada	Indianapolis
19:30 EST (UTC−5)	Falvey (yellow card) 1'; Braun 13'; Zayed 16', 58', 65'; Vuković 36'; Janicki (red card) 89'	Summary	Keita 33' (red card) 88'; Scaglia (yellow card) 40'; Falvey 80' (o.g.); Navarro (yellow card) 90'	Stadium: Michael Carroll Stadium; Attendance: 8,017; Referee: Rosendo Mendoza

6 August 2016 8	Jacksonville Armada	2–2	Carolina RailHawks	Jacksonville
19:00 EST (UTC−5)	Eloundou 19', 50'; George (yellow card) 25'	Summary	Fondy 6' da Luz (yellow card) 33' (yellow-red card) 70'; Black (yellow card) 49'; Bravo 68'	Stadium: Community First Park; Attendance: 3,601; Referee: Nima Saghafi

13 August 2016 9	Ottawa Fury	1–2	Jacksonville Armada	Ottawa
17:00 EST (UTC−5)	Haworth 26'; Bailey (yellow card) 49'	Summary	Keita 28', 87'	Stadium: TD Place Stadium; Attendance: 5,786; Referee: David Barrie

17 August 2016 10	Jacksonville Armada	1–1	Fort Lauderdale Strikers	Jacksonville
19:00 EST (UTC−5)	Steinberger 42'; George (yellow card) 67'	Summary	Angulo 20'; Adrianinho (yellow card) 26'; Gonzalez (yellow card) 32'; Dalton (yellow card) 61'; Pineda (yellow card) 88'; Fernandes (yellow card) 90'	Stadium: Community First Park; Attendance: 2,472; Referee: Luis Guardia

19 August 2016 11	Jacksonville Armada	0–0	Minnesota United	Jacksonville
14:30 EST (UTC−5)	Bahner (yellow card) 82'	Summary	Watson (yellow card) 43'; Ibson (yellow card) 43' (red card) 77'	Stadium: Community First Park; Attendance: 2,516; Referee: Jaime Herrera Garduno

3 September 2016 12	Carolina RailHawks	1–0	Jacksonville Armada	Cary
19:30 EST (UTC−5)	Shipalane 43'; Albadawi (yellow card) 68'	Summary	Wallace (yellow card) 50'; Keita (yellow card) 70'; Lagerblom (yellow card) 74'	Stadium: WakeMed Soccer Park; Attendance: 4,156; Referee: Geoff Gamble

11 September 2016 13	Rayo OKC	3–2	Jacksonville Armada	Yukon
20:00 EST (UTC−5)	Chávez (yellow card) 18' (goal) 25'; Yuma (yellow card) 31'; Ibeagha 58' (yellow card) 90+3'; Jerome 64' (o.g.)	Summary	Ruthven 62'; Eloundou 90+3'	Stadium: Miller Stadium; Attendance: 924; Referee: Alex Chilowicz

17 September 2016 14	Puerto Rico	3–3	Jacksonville Armada	Bayamón
19:30 EST (UTC−5)	Marrero 3'; Oliver 32'; Soria (yellow card) 59'; S.Rivera 84'	Summary	Eloundou 29'; Bahner (yellow card) 34'; Jérôme 57'; Keita 83'	Stadium: Juan Ramón Loubriel Stadium; Attendance: 3,243; Referee: Kevin Morrison

24 September 2016 15	Jacksonville Armada	1–1	Rayo OKC	Jacksonville
19:00 EST (UTC−5)	Eloundou 19'; George (yellow card) 23'	Summary	McKenzie (yellow card) 87'; Michel 90+3'	Stadium: Community First Park; Attendance: 3,472; Referee: Marcos de Oliveira

28 September 2016 16	Jacksonville Armada	0–0	Edmonton	Jacksonville
19:00 EST (UTC−5)	Scaglia (yellow card) 23'	Summary	Ledgerwood (yellow card) 35'; Eckersley (yellow card) 55'; N.Di Biase (yellow card) 90'	Stadium: Community First Park; Attendance: 2,537; Referee: Rubiel Vazquez

1 October 2016 17	Minnesota United	0–1	Jacksonville Armada	Blaine
20:00 EST (UTC−5)	Pitchkolan (yellow card) 85'	Summary	Barrow (yellow card) 48'; Eloundou (yellow card) 56'; Bahner 88'	Stadium: National Sports Center; Attendance: 9,402; Referee: Fotis Bazakos

13 October 2016 18	Jacksonville Armada	0–0	Indy Eleven	Jacksonville
19:00 EST (UTC−5)	Eloundou (yellow card) 40'	Summary	Falvey (yellow card) 66'; Ubiparipović (yellow card) 85'	Stadium: Baseball Grounds of Jacksonville; Attendance: 1,254; Referee: Guido Gonzalez

15 October 2016 19	Jacksonville Armada	2–4	New York Cosmos	Jacksonville
19:00 EST (UTC−5)	Bahner (yellow card) 37'; Steinberger (yellow card) 62' (goal) 79'; Keita 66' (yellow card) 70' (yellow-red card) 84'; Gebhard (yellow card) 81'; Gallardo (yellow card) 84'; Eloundou (yellow card) 87'	Summary	Orozco 23'; Ochieng (yellow card) 54'; Arango 83', 88'; Arrieta 90+5'	Stadium: Baseball Grounds of Jacksonville; Attendance: 3,044; Referee: Luis Guardia

19 October 2016 20	Jacksonville Armada	3–2	Miami	Jacksonville
19:00 EST (UTC−5)	Eloundou 1'; George (yellow card) 23'; Dixon 69'; Scaglia 74'	Summary	Ryan (yellow card) 12'; Martínez 27'; Chavez (yellow card) 60'; Farfán 65' (yellow card) 90'; Poku (yellow card) 88' (red card) 90+3'; Borrajo (yellow card) 90+3'	Stadium: Baseball Grounds of Jacksonville; Attendance: 1,608; Referee: Daniel Radford

23 October 2016 21	Edmonton	1–0	Jacksonville Armada	Edmonton
16:00 EST (UTC−5)	K.Smith (yellow card) 12'; Nicklaw (yellow card) 90+2'; Fordyce 90+7' (pen.)	Summary	Jérôme (yellow card) 73'	Stadium: Clarke Stadium; Attendance: 2,705; Referee: Yusri Rudolf

30 October 2016 22	Jacksonville Armada	3–2	Tampa Bay Rowdies	Jacksonville
15:00 EST (UTC−5)	Keita 29'; Dixon (yellow card) 59'; Johnson 83'; Steinberger 84'	Summary	Vingaard 4' (yellow card) 45+2'; Savage 19'; Heinemann (yellow card) 45'	Stadium: Baseball Grounds of Jacksonville; Attendance: 4,572; Referee: Alejandro Mariscal

=== U.S. Open Cup ===
June 1, 2016 Third Round	Jacksonville Armada	2–1 (a.e.t.)	Charleston Battery	Jacksonville
19:00 EDT	Otte 17'; Sandoval (yellow card) 36'; Keita 108'	Summary	Tsonis 22'; Adjetey (yellow card) 47'	Stadium: Southern Oak Stadium; Attendance: 1,200; Referee: Kevin Terry

June 15, 2016 Fourth Round	Jacksonville Armada	0–1	Orlando City	Jacksonville
19:00 EDT	Wallace (yellow card) 41'; George (yellow card) 75'; Sandoval (yellow card) 80'; Scaglia (yellow card) 86'	Summary	Alston (yellow card) 28'; Mateos 62'	Stadium: Southern Oak Stadium; Attendance: 2,155; Referee: Rubiel Vazquez

== Squad statistics ==
As of Match played 30 October 2016

=== Appearances and goals ===
No.	Pos	Nat	Player	Total		NASL Spring Season		NASL Fall Season		U.S. Open Cup	
No.	Pos	Nat	Player	Apps	Goals	Apps	Goals	Apps	Goals	Apps	Goals
1	GK	(Mexico) MEX	Miguel Gallardo	23	0	9+1	0	11	0	2	0
2	DF	(United States) USA	Tyler Ruthven	32	1	10	0	20	1	2	0
3	MF	(United States) USA	Anthony Wallace	17	0	0+1	0	13+2	0	1	0
4	DF	(Haiti) HAI	Mechack Jérôme	25	1	6	0	17+1	1	1	0
5	DF	(United States) USA	Beto Navarro	13	0	4	0	6+1	0	2	0
6	MF	(Sweden) SWE	Nicklas Maripuu	14	0	0	0	13+1	0	0	0
7	DF	(United States) USA	Bryan Burke	21	0	6	0	12+1	0	2	0
8	MF	(Finland) FIN	Pekka Lagerblom	10	0	0	0	6+4	0	0	0
9	FW	(Sweden) SWE	Alexander Andersson	4	0	0	0	4	0	0	0
10	FW	(Guinea) GUI	Alhassane Keita	24	7	6+3	0	11+2	6	1+1	1
11	FW	(United States) USA	Jemal Johnson	23	2	6+2	0	12+3	2	0	0
13	DF	(United States) USA	Matt Bahner	23	3	6+1	2	13+3	1	0	0
16	MF	(Argentina) ARG	Lucas Scaglia	15	1	2+1	0	8+3	1	0+1	0
17	MF	(Colombia) COL	Nicolás Perea	5	0	4+1	0	0	0	0	0
18	MF	(Germany) GER	Jason Plumhoff	5	0	0	0	2+3	0	0	0
19	MF	(Trinidad and Tobago) TTO	Kevan George	30	0	9	0	18+1	0	2	0
20	MF	(Wales) WAL	Danny Barrow	16	0	4	0	4+6	0	1+1	0
21	MF	(United States) USA	Alex Dixon	16	2	1+4	0	4+6	2	0+1	0
23	GK	(United States) USA	Sean Lewis	11	0	0	0	10+1	0	0	0
25	MF	(United States) USA	Zach Steinberger	20	4	0	0	18+2	4	0	0
27	FW	(United States) USA	Derek Gebhard	12	0	1+3	0	0+7	0	0+1	0
29	DF	(Netherlands) NED	Patrick Otte	11	1	5+1	0	3	0	2	1
52	DF	(Canada) CAN	Karl Ouimette	7	0	0	0	5+2	0	0	0
99	FW	(Cameroon) CMR	Charles Eloundou	31	6	2+7	0	11+9	6	1+1	0
Players who left Jacksonville Armada during the season:
6	MF	(Republic of Ireland) IRL	Richie Ryan	5	0	5	0	0	0	0	0
9	FW	(United States) USA	Matthew Fondy	9	0	6+2	0	0	0	1	0
12	MF	(Honduras) HON	Junior Sandoval	18	2	7+2	2	7	0	2	0
14	MF	(Haiti) HAI	Pascal Millien	14	1	5+1	1	4+3	0	1	0
15	DF	(Guam) GUM	Shawn Nicklaw	7	0	5+1	0	0	0	1	0
22	GK	(United States) USA	Sebastian Evers	1	0	1	0	0	0	0	0

=== Goal scorers ===
Place	Position	Nation	Number	Name	NASL Spring Season	NASL Fall Season	U.S. Open Cup	Total
1	FW	(Guinea)	10	Alhassane Keita	0	6	1	7
2	FW	(Cameroon)	99	Charles Eloundou	0	6	0	6
3	MF	(United States)	25	Zach Steinberger	0	4	0	4
4	DF	(United States)	13	Matt Bahner	2	1	0	3
5	MF	(Honduras)	12	Junior Sandoval	2	0	0	2
5	MF	(United States)	21	Alex Dixon	0	2	0	2
5	FW	(United States)	11	Jemal Johnson	0	2	0	2
8	MF	(Haiti)	14	Pascal Millien	1	0	0	1
8	DF	(United States)	2	Tyler Ruthven	0	1	0	1
8	DF	(Haiti)	4	Mechack Jérôme	0	1	0	1
8	MF	(Argentina)	16	Lucas Scaglia	0	1	0	1
8	DF	(Netherlands)	29	Patrick Otte	0	0	1	1
TOTALS					5	23	2	30

=== Disciplinary record ===
Number	Nation	Position	Name	NASL Spring Season		NASL Fall Season		U.S. Open Cup		Total	
Number	Nation	Position	Name	Yellow card	Red card	Yellow card	Red card	Yellow card	Red card	Yellow card	Red card
1	(Mexico)	GK	Miguel Gallardo	0	0	1	0	0	0	1	0
2	(United States)	DF	Tyler Ruthven	1	0	1	0	0	0	2	0
3	(United States)	MF	Anthony Wallace	0	0	2	0	1	0	3	0
4	(Haiti)	DF	Mechack Jérôme	0	0	2	0	0	0	2	0
5	(United States)	DF	Beto Navarro	1	0	2	1	0	0	3	1
6	(Republic of Ireland)	MF	Richie Ryan	1	0	0	0	0	0	1	0
8	(Finland)	MF	Pekka Lagerblom	0	0	1	0	0	0	1	0
10	(Guinea)	FW	Alhassane Keita	4	0	3	2	0	0	7	2
11	(United States)	FW	Jemal Johnson	1	0	2	0	0	0	3	0
12	(Honduras)	MF	Junior Sandoval	0	0	0	0	2	0	2	0
13	(United States)	DF	Matt Bahner	1	0	3	0	0	0	4	0
15	(Guam)	MF	Shawn Nicklaw	0	1	0	0	0	0	0	1
16	(Argentina)	MF	Lucas Scaglia	0	0	4	0	1	0	5	0
17	(Colombia)	MF	Nicolás Perea	1	0	0	0	0	0	1	0
19	(Trinidad and Tobago)	MF	Kevan George	3	0	5	0	1	0	9	0
20	(Wales)	MF	Danny Barrow	0	0	1	0	0	0	1	0
21	(United States)	MF	Alex Dixon	0	0	1	0	0	0	1	0
23	(United States)	GK	Sean Lewis	0	0	1	0	0	0	1	0
25	(United States)	MF	Zach Steinberger	0	0	1	0	0	0	1	0
27	(United States)	FW	Derek Gebhard	0	0	1	0	0	0	1	0
99	(Cameroon)	FW	Charles Eloundou	3	0	2	0	0	0	5	0
			TOTALS	16	1	31	3	7	0	54	4
