= 2015 Jacksonville Armada FC season =

Jacksonville Armada
2015 season
- Owner: Mark Frisch
- Head coach: José Luis Villarreal (Until 22 May 2015); Guillermo Ángel Hoyos (14 June – 21 September 2015); Eric Dade (interim) (from 21 September 2015)
- Stadium: Baseball Grounds of Jacksonville
- NASL: Spring: 6th Fall: 11th Combined: 11th
- U.S. Open Cup: Third Round vs Richmond Kickers
Home colors	Away colors

The 2015 Jacksonville Armada FC season was the club's first season of existence, they played in the North American Soccer League, the second tier of the American soccer pyramid.

== Season Review ==
José Luis Villarreal was appointed as the club's first manager on June 11, 2014.

Villarreal announced he would be leaving Armada at the end of the Spring season on May 22, with Guillermo Ángel Hoyos replacing him as head coach. On June 30, Armada extended Head Coach Guillermo Ángel Hoyos' contract until the end of the 2019 season, before dismissing Hoyos on September 21 and placing Eric Dade as Interim Manager.

=== Media ===
All Armada NASL matches would be broadcast locally on television on WCWJ CW17 and on the radio on WFXJ "Sports Radio 930". The play-by-play announcer would be Cole Pepper, who is experienced doing sports announcing in the Jacksonville area, including 15 years with the Jacksonville Jaguars.

Armada matches can be streamed online via NASL's TV package with ESPN3, or iHeart Radio.

== Roster ==
As of match played November 1, 2015

No.	Name	Nationality	Position	Date of birth (age)	Signed from	Signed in	Contract ends	Apps.	Goals
Goalkeepers
1	Miguel Gallardo	(Mexico)	GK	24 October 1984 (aged 31)	Orlando City	2015		23	0
12	David Sierra	(Spain)	GK	16 September 1983 (aged 32)	(Spain) Puerta Bonita	2015		8	0
22	Sebastian Evers	(United States)	GK	2 January 1991 (aged 24)	UCF Knights	2015		0	0
Defenders
2	Jordan Gafa	(United States)	DF	19 June 1990 (aged 25)	Tampa Bay Rowdies	2015		6	0
3	Lucas Trejo	(Argentina)	DF	29 December 1987 (aged 27)	(Argentina) Instituto ACC	2015		26	0
4	Mechack Jérôme	(Haiti)	DF	21 April 1990 (aged 25)	Charlotte Independence	2015		6	1
5	Nurdin Hrustic	(Bosnia and Herzegovina)	DF	5 November 1988 (aged 26)	Jacksonville United	2015		12	0
6	Fabricio Ortiz	(Argentina)	DF	17 March 1990 (aged 25)	(Argentina) Alumni de Villa María	2015		24	0
13	Matt Bahner	(United States)	DF	12 March 1990 (aged 25)	Harrisburg City Islanders	2015		23	0
15	Shawn Nicklaw	(Guam)	DF	15 April 1989 (aged 26)	(Iceland) Þór Akureyri	2015		24	0
20	Joseph Toby	(Sierra Leone)	DF	6 February 1989 (aged 26)	Arizona United	2015		16	1
Midfielders
7	Lucas Rodríguez	(Argentina)	MF	8 February 1986 (aged 29)		2015		20	0
8	Bochy Hoyos	(Argentina)	MF	20 December 1983 (aged 31)	(Venezuela) Carabobo	2015		19	2
9	Marcos Flores	(Argentina)	MF	23 October 1985 (aged 30)	(Australia) Newcastle Jets	2015		22	2
14	Pascal Millien	(Haiti)	MF	3 May 1986 (aged 29)	(Italy) Fidelis Andria	2015		25	6
16	Lucas Scaglia	(Argentina)	MF	6 May 1987 (aged 28)	(Croatia) Rijeka	2015		27	1
17	Nicolás Perea	(Colombia)	MF	1 August 1992 (aged 23)	Syracuse Orange	2015		19	0
19	Nico Zaldana	(United States)	MF	7 May 1996 (aged 19)	(Spain) Málaga	2015		1	0
21	Ramak Safi	(Iran)	MF	7 February 1984 (aged 31)	Jacksonville Armada Development Squad	2015		1	0
23	Jaime Castrillón	(Colombia)	MF	5 April 1983 (aged 32)		2015		28	3
Forwards
10	Alhassane Keita	(Guinea)	FW	26 June 1983 (aged 32)	(Switzerland) St. Gallen	2015		20	7
11	Jemal Johnson	(United States)	FW	3 May 1985 (aged 30)	New York Cosmos	2015		29	5
18	Tommy Križanović	(Croatia)	FW	20 November 1984 (aged 30)	Jacksonville United	2015		17	1
24	Chaim Roserie	(Canada)	FW	9 September 1987 (aged 28)		2015		0	0
25	Tyler Williams	(United States)	FW	23 March 1989 (aged 26)	Jacksonville United	2015		8	0
26	Akeil Barrett	(Jamaica)	FW	7 July 1992 (aged 23)	Orlando City	2015		24	3
27	Derek Gebhard	(United States)	FW	15 October 1995 (aged 20)	Jacksonville United	2015		5	0

== Transfers ==
=== Winter ===
Note: Flags indicate national team as has been defined under FIFA eligibility rules. Players may hold more than one non-FIFA nationality.

In: Note: Flags indicate national team as defined under FIFA eligibility rules; some limited exceptions apply. Players may hold more than one non-FIFA nationality.

No.	Pos.	Nation	Player
1	GK	MEX	Miguel Gallardo (from (United States) Orlando City)
2	DF	USA	Jordan Gafa (from (United States) Tampa Bay Rowdies)
3	DF	ARG	Lucas Trejo (from (Argentina) Instituto ACC)
6	DF	ARG	Fabricio Ortiz (from (Argentina) Alumni de Villa María)
7	MF	ARG	Lucas Rodríguez
8	MF	ARG	Bochy Hoyos (from (Venezuela) Carabobo)
9	MF	ARG	Marcos Flores (from (Australia) Newcastle Jets)
10	FW	GUI	Alhassane Keita (from (Switzerland) St. Gallen)
11	FW	USA	Jemal Johnson (from (United States) New York Cosmos)
12	GK	ESP	David Sierra (from (Spain) Puerta Bonita)
13	DF	USA	Matt Bahner (from (United States) UCF Knights)
14	MF	HAI	Pascal Millien (from (Italy) Fidelis Andria)
15	DF	GUM	Shawn Nicklaw (from (United States) UCF Knights)
16	MF	ARG	Lucas Scaglia (from (Croatia) Rijeka)
17	MF	COL	Nicolás Perea (from (United States) Syracuse Orange)
20	DF	SLE	Joseph Toby (from (United States) Arizona United)
21	MF	IRI	Ramak Safi (from (United States) Jacksonville Armada Development Squad)
22	GK	USA	Sebastian Evers (from (United States) UCF Knights)
23	FW	COL	Jaime Castrillón
25	FW	USA	Tyler Williams (from (United States) Jacksonville United)
26	FW	JAM	Akeil Barrett (from (United States) Orlando City)

Out: Note: Flags indicate national team as defined under FIFA eligibility rules; some limited exceptions apply. Players may hold more than one non-FIFA nationality.

No.	Pos.	Nation	Player

=== Summer ===
Note: Flags indicate national team as has been defined under FIFA eligibility rules. Players may hold more than one non-FIFA nationality.

In: Note: Flags indicate national team as defined under FIFA eligibility rules; some limited exceptions apply. Players may hold more than one non-FIFA nationality.

No.	Pos.	Nation	Player
4	MF	USA	Ethan Sonis (loan from (Germany) Freiburg)
4	DF	HAI	Mechack Jérôme (from (United States) Charlotte Independence)
24	FW	CAN	Chaim Roserie
27	FW	USA	Derek Gebhard (from (United States) Jacksonville United)

Out: Note: Flags indicate national team as defined under FIFA eligibility rules; some limited exceptions apply. Players may hold more than one non-FIFA nationality.

No.	Pos.	Nation	Player
4	MF	USA	Ethan Sonis (loan return to (Germany) Freiburg)

== Friendlies ==
February 1, 2015 Scrimmage	Jacksonville Armada	1–2	New York City	Jacksonville
EDT	Perea 50'	[ Summary]	Shelton 8'; Naglestad 95' (pen.)	Stadium: Patton Park
Note: Four 24-minute quarters.

February 5, 2015 Scrimmage	Jacksonville Armada	4–1	New York Red Bulls	Davenport
EDT	Johnson 5'; Castrillón 8'; Millien 20'; Roserie 57'	[ Summary]	Stevenson 30'	Stadium: Championsgate Sports Complex
Note: Three 25-minute periods.

February 7, 2015	Jacksonville Armada	3–1	Philadelphia Union	Jacksonville
17:30 EDT	Ortiz 7'; Keita 11'; Scaglia (yellow card) 42'; Trejo 45' (pen.)	Report	Wenger 23'; Konate (yellow card) 51'; Fabinho (yellow card) 88'	Stadium: EverBank Field; Attendance: 13,934; Referee: Jorge Gonzalez

February 18, 2015	Charleston Battery	1–0	Jacksonville Armada	Charleston
EDT	Savage 47'	Report		Stadium: Blackbaud Stadium

February 28, 2015	Jacksonville Armada	1–0	Fort Lauderdale Strikers	Jacksonville
19:30 EDT	Scaglia (yellow card) 16'; Nicklaw 44'	Report		Stadium: Baseball Grounds of Jacksonville; Attendance: 5,232

March 8, 2015	Jacksonville Armada	0–2	Charleston Battery	Jacksonville
19:30 EDT		Report	Cordovés 62' vanSchaik 66' (pen.)	Stadium: Baseball Grounds of Jacksonville; Attendance: 6,000

March 21, 2015	Fort Lauderdale Strikers	5–0	Jacksonville Armada	Fort Lauderdale
19:30 EDT	Stefano 17', 43'; Frimpong 46'; Ramírez 71'; Angulo 89'	Report		Stadium: Lockhart Stadium

March 25, 2015	Jacksonville Dolphins	0–2	Jacksonville Armada	Jacksonville
19:30 EDT		Report	Barrett 43'; Johnson 51'	Stadium: Southern Oak Field

March 28, 2015	Jacksonville Armada	0–2	Tampa Bay Rowdies	Jacksonville
19:30 EDT	Safi (yellow card) 24'; Roserie (yellow card) 70'	Report	Savage 43'; Shriver 58'	Stadium: EverBank Field; Attendance: 6,674

June 27, 2015 International Community Cup	Jacksonville Armada (United States)	2–4	(Argentina) Boca Juniors	Jacksonville
20:00 EDT	Trejo 23' (pen.); Nicklaw (yellow card) 53'; Ortiz (yellow card) 69'; Williams (yellow card) 70'; Safi 86'	Report	Calleri 8'; Magallán (yellow card) 30'; Erbes (yellow card) 35'; Meli 62'; Cristaldo 74'; Chávez 82'	Stadium: EverBank Field; Attendance: 11,315

== Competitions ==
=== NASL Spring season ===
==== Standings ====
Pos	Team	Pld	W	D	L	GF	GA	GD	Pts	Qualification
1	New York Cosmos (S)	10	5	5	0	18	9	+9	20	Playoffs
2	Tampa Bay Rowdies	10	5	4	1	15	9	+6	19	
3	Carolina RailHawks	10	3	5	2	15	10	+5	14	
4	Minnesota United	10	3	5	2	15	13	+2	14	
5	Indy Eleven	10	3	4	3	13	12	+1	13	
6	Jacksonville Armada	10	3	3	4	15	18	−3	12	
7	San Antonio Scorpions	10	3	3	4	11	15	−4	12	
8	Fort Lauderdale Strikers	10	3	2	5	12	13	−1	11	
9	Ottawa Fury	10	2	5	3	5	8	−3	11	
10	FC Edmonton	10	2	3	5	16	22	−6	9	
11	Atlanta Silverbacks	10	1	5	4	7	13	−6	8	

Source: NASL
Rules for classification: 1) points; 2) total goal differential; 3) total goals scored; 4) head-to-head record; 5) away goal differential; 6) away goals scored
(S) Spring season champion

==== Results summary ====
Overall								Home						Away					
Pld	W	D	L	GF	GA	GD	Pts	W	D	L	GF	GA	GD	W	D	L	GF	GA	GD
10	3	3	4	15	18	−3	12	3	1	1	6	6	0	0	2	3	9	12	−3

Last updated: 14 June 2015.
Source: Match reports

==== Results by round ====
Round	1	2	3	4	5	6	7	8	9	10
Stadium	H	A	A	H	H	A	A	H	H	A
Result	W	L	L	W	W	D	L	L	D	D
Position										

Updated to match(es) played on 14 June 2015. Source: Match reports
A = Away; H = Home; W = Win; D = Draw; L = Loss

==== Results ====
April 4, 2015 1	Jacksonville Armada	3–1	Edmonton	Jacksonville
19:30 EDT	Johnson 1'; Ortiz (yellow card) 4'; Scaglia (yellow card) 32'; Keita 44'; Flores 45'; Millien (yellow card) 89'	Summary	Jones 52' (yellow card) 67'; Edward (yellow card) 90'	Stadium: EverBank Field; Attendance: 16,164; Referee: Marcos de Oliveira

April 11, 2015 2 Coastal Cup	Fort Lauderdale Strikers	2–1	Jacksonville Armada	Fort Lauderdale
19:30 EDT	Sanfilippo (yellow card) 7'; Moura 45'; Freitas (yellow card) 64'; PC 65'; Stefano (red card) 90'	Summary	Trejo (yellow card) 44' (yellow-red card) 90'; Hoyos 49'; Scaglia (yellow card) 90+2'	Stadium: Lockhart Stadium; Attendance: 4,883; Referee: Younes Marrakchi

April 25, 2015 3 Coastal Cup	Tampa Bay Rowdies	3–2	Jacksonville Armada	St. Petersburg
19:30 EDT	Santos 12' (pen.), 77'; Boggs (yellow card) 50'; Nuñez 59'; Hristov (yellow card) 90'	Summary	Flores 14' (yellow card) 47'; Johnson 32'; Ortiz (yellow card) 41'	Stadium: Al Lang Stadium; Attendance: 5,460; Referee: Daniel Fitzgerald

May 2, 2015 4	Jacksonville Armada	2–1	San Antonio Scorpions	Jacksonville
19:30 EDT	Millien 3'; Trejo (yellow card) 34'; Ortiz (yellow card) 56'; Johnson (yellow card) 61'; Keita (yellow card) 63' (goal) 90+2'	Summary	Cummings 9'; Castillo (yellow card) 28'; Attakora (yellow card) 63'; DeRoux (yellow card) 68'; Tsiskaridze (yellow card) 74'	Stadium: Baseball Grounds of Jacksonville; Attendance: 8,147; Referee: Kevin Terry Jr.

May 9, 2015 5	Jacksonville Armada	1–0	Indy Eleven	Jacksonville
19:30 EDT	Ortiz (yellow card) 43'; Hoyos 50'; Toby (yellow card) 90'	Summary	Peña (yellow card) 25'; Janicki (yellow card) 74'; Franco (yellow card) 82'	Stadium: Baseball Grounds of Jacksonville; Attendance: 8,318; Referee: Nima Saghafi

May 16, 2015 6	Atlanta Silverbacks	1–1	Jacksonville Armada	Atlanta
19:30 EDT	Denissen 1'	Summary	Keita 20'; Ortiz (yellow card) 26'; Trejo (yellow card) 37'	Stadium: Atlanta Silverbacks Park; Attendance: 4,736; Referee: Fotis Bazakos

May 23, 2015 7	Minnesota United	3–2	Jacksonville Armada	Blaine
19:00 EDT	Dias (yellow card) 1'; Campos 53' (pen.) (yellow card) 79'; Calvano 59' (yellow card) 82'; Ibarra 76'	Summary	Nicklaw (yellow card) 13'; Scaglia (yellow card) 34'; Trejo (yellow card) 69'; Millien 71'; Johnson 83'	Stadium: National Sports Center; Attendance: 9,012; Referee: Daniel Fitzgerald

May 30, 2015 8	Jacksonville Armada	0–4	Carolina RailHawks	Jacksonville
19:30 EDT	Scaglia (yellow card) 32'; Ortiz (yellow card) 40'	Summary	Tobin 9'; Hlavaty 36'; Osaki 41'; Anderson 44' (pen.); Novo (yellow card) 82'	Stadium: Baseball Grounds of Jacksonville; Attendance: 8,573; Referee: Alex Chilowicz

June 7, 2015 9	Jacksonville Armada	0–0	Ottawa Fury	Jacksonville
16:00 EDT	Bahner (yellow card) 72'; Hrustic (yellow card) 83'	Summary	Paulo Jr. (yellow card) 24'; Wiedeman (yellow card) 90'	Stadium: Baseball Grounds of Jacksonville; Attendance: 7,586; Referee: Mark Geiger

June 13, 2015 10	New York Cosmos	3–3	Jacksonville Armada	Hempstead
19:00 EDT	Gallardo 7' (o.g.); Chirishian 26'; Mkosana 86'	Summary	Johnson (yellow card) 45'; Bahner (yellow card) 51'; Millien 59', 73'; Perea (yellow card) 62'; Toby 89'	Stadium: James M. Shuart Stadium; Attendance: 7,353; Referee: Kevin Terry Jr.

=== NASL Fall season ===
==== Standings ====
Pos	Team	Pld	W	D	L	GF	GA	GD	Pts	Qualification
1	Ottawa Fury (F)	20	13	6	1	37	15	+22	45	Playoffs
2	Minnesota United	20	11	6	3	39	26	+13	39	
3	New York Cosmos	20	10	6	4	31	21	+10	36	
4	Fort Lauderdale Strikers	20	8	6	6	37	27	+10	30	
5	FC Edmonton	20	7	5	8	25	24	+1	26	
6	Atlanta Silverbacks	20	6	7	7	24	27	−3	25	
7	Carolina RailHawks	20	6	3	11	29	39	−10	21	
8	Tampa Bay Rowdies	20	5	5	10	18	28	−10	20	
9	Indy Eleven	20	5	5	10	23	36	−13	20	
10	San Antonio Scorpions	20	4	7	9	30	37	−7	19	
11	Jacksonville Armada	20	5	4	11	18	31	−13	19	

Source: NASL
Rules for classification: 1) points; 2) total goal differential; 3) total goals scored; 4) head-to-head record; 5) away goal differential; 6) away goals scored
(F) Fall season champion

==== Results summary ====
Overall								Home						Away					
Pld	W	D	L	GF	GA	GD	Pts	W	D	L	GF	GA	GD	W	D	L	GF	GA	GD
20	5	4	11	18	31	−13	19	5	3	2	15	10	+5	0	1	9	3	21	−18

Last updated: 1 November 2015.
Source: Match reports

==== Results by round ====
Round	1	2	3	4	5	6	7	8	9	10	11	12	13	14	15	16	17	18	19	20
Stadium	A	A	A	H	H	A	H	H	A	H	A	A	A	H	H	A	H	H	A	H
Result	L	L	L	W	D	L	W	W	L	D	L	L	L	W	D	L	W	L	D	L
Position																				

Updated to match(es) played on 1 November 2015. Source: Match reports
A = Away; H = Home; W = Win; D = Draw; L = Loss

==== Results ====
July 5, 2015 1	Ottawa Fury	2–0	Jacksonville Armada	Ottawa
15:00 EDT	Trafford 13'; Ryan (yellow card) 76'; Heinemann 86'	Summary	Trejo (yellow card) 20'; Keita (yellow card) 41'	Stadium: TD Place Stadium; Attendance: 6,150; Referee: Pierre Luce Lauziere

July 11, 2015 2	Atlanta Silverbacks	1–0	Jacksonville Armada	Atlanta
19:30 EDT	Reed 60'; Mensing (yellow card) 76'; Black (yellow card) 78'; Mravec (yellow card) 82'	Summary	Nicklaw (yellow card) 49'; Flores (yellow card) 80'; Scaglia (yellow card) 84' (yellow-red card) 90'	Stadium: Atlanta Silverbacks Park; Attendance: 4,717; Referee: Kevin Terry Jr.

July 15, 2015 3	Minnesota United	4–0	Jacksonville Armada	Blaine
20:00 EDT	Juliano 13'; Bre.Kallman (yellow card) 16'; Mendes 50'; Ramirez 60'; Ibson 75'; Banks (yellow card) 78'; Pitchkolan (yellow card) 81'	Summary	Keita (yellow card) 20' (red card) 45+6'; Ortiz (yellow card) 90+2'	Stadium: National Sports Center; Attendance: 9,412; Referee: Tyler Ploeger

July 18, 2015 4	Jacksonville Armada	1–0	New York Cosmos	Jacksonville
19:40 EDT	Križanović 54'	Summary	Stokkelien (yellow card) 90'	Stadium: EverBank Field; Attendance: 8,167; Referee: Matthew Kreitzer

July 31, 2015 5	Jacksonville Armada	3–3	Minnesota United	Jacksonville
19:35 EDT	Johnson 5' (yellow card) 37'; Barrett 23'; Nicklaw (yellow card) 41' (red card) 83'; Keita 72'; Castrillón (yellow card) 79'; Scaglia (yellow card) 86'	Summary	Ramirez 21'; Calvano (yellow card) 50'; Alhassan (yellow card) 64'; Davis 78'; Ibson 84'	Stadium: EverBank Field; Attendance: 6,847; Referee: Marcos Deoliveira

August 8, 2015 6 Coastal Cup	Tampa Bay Rowdies	3–2	Jacksonville Armada	St. Petersburg
19:30 EDT	Santos 7', 32'; Núñez (yellow card) 37'; Shriver 50'; Guerra (yellow card) 61'	Summary	Barrett (yellow card) 38'; Keita 54', 67'; Trejo (red card) 79'	Stadium: Al Lang Stadium; Attendance: 5,493; Referee: Kevin Terry Jr.

August 12, 2015 7	Jacksonville Armada	3–0	Carolina RailHawks	Jacksonville
19:30 EDT	Castrillón 32' (yellow card) 76'; Barrett 33' (yellow card) 85'; Johnson 62'; Scaglia (yellow card) 79'	Summary	Low (yellow card) 28'; Scott (red card) 82'	Stadium: EverBank Field; Attendance: 5,652; Referee: Robert Sibiga

August 15, 2015 8	Jacksonville Armada	1–0	Atlanta Silverbacks	Jacksonville
19:30 EDT	Castrillón 41'; Ortiz (yellow card) 42'	Summary	Pedro Ferreira-Mendes (yellow card) 42'; McKenzie (yellow card) 90+1'	Stadium: EverBank Field; Attendance: 7,054; Referee: Alex Chilowicz

August 22, 2015 9	San Antonio Scorpions	1–0	Jacksonville Armada	San Antonio
20:30 EDT	Forbes 64'; Palacios (yellow card) 87'	Summary	Ortiz (yellow card) 5'; Castrillón (yellow card) 49'; Millien (yellow card) 86'	Stadium: Toyota Field; Attendance: 7,569; Referee: Marcos de Oliveira

August 29, 2015 10	Jacksonville Armada	0–0	San Antonio Scorpions	Jacksonville
21:00 EDT	Scaglia (yellow card) 27'	Summary	Rusin (yellow card) 62'	Stadium: EverBank Field; Attendance: 7,053; Referee: Baboucarr Jallow

September 5, 2015 11	Indy Eleven	3–0	Jacksonville Armada	Indianapolis
19:30 EDT	Steinberger 9', 73'; Keller (yellow card) 38'; Ceballos 90' (yellow card) 90'	Summary	Barrett (yellow card) 81'	Stadium: Carroll Stadium; Attendance: 9,078; Referee: Sorin Stoica

September 12, 2015 12	New York Cosmos	1–0	Jacksonville Armada	Hempstead
19:00 EDT	Raúl 74'	Summary	Scaglia (yellow card) 24' (red card) 90'; Trejo (red card) 52'; Perea (yellow card) 58'; Barrett (yellow card) 86'	Stadium: James M. Shuart Stadium; Attendance: 5,089; Referee: Nima Saghafi

September 16, 2015 13 Coastal Cup	Fort Lauderdale Strikers	2–0	Jacksonville Armada	Fort Lauderdale
19:35 EDT	Freitas 17'; Sánchez (yellow card) 88'; Marcelin 90'	Summary	Nicklaw (yellow card) 28'; Rodríguez (yellow card) 39'; Ortiz (yellow card) 56'	Stadium: Lockhart Stadium; Attendance: 1,278; Referee: Daniel Radford

September 26, 2015 14 Coastal Cup	Jacksonville Armada	2–0	Tampa Bay Rowdies	Jacksonville
19:35 EDT	Scaglia 34'; Millien 74'	Summary	Saragosa (yellow card) 8'	Stadium: EverBank Field; Attendance: 7,163; Referee: Alejandro Mariscal

October 3, 2015 15	Jacksonville Armada	1–1	Indy Eleven	Jacksonville
19:30 EDT	Castrillón 29'; Scaglia (yellow card) 33'; Jérôme (red card) 63'; Hrustic (yellow card) 79'; Johnson (yellow card) 88'	Summary	Brown 83'	Stadium: EverBank Field; Attendance: 6,734; Referee: Juan Guzmán

October 10, 2015 16	Carolina RailHawks	3–0	Jacksonville Armada	Cary
19:30 EDT	Shipalane 35'; Albadawi 42', 90'; Pérez (yellow card) 67'; Fitzgerald (yellow card) 88'	Summary	Johnson (yellow card) 83'; Flores (yellow card) 90'	Stadium: WakeMed Soccer Park; Attendance: 3,424; Referee: Rubiel Vazquez

October 17, 2015 17	Jacksonville Armada	3–2	Edmonton	Jacksonville
19:35 EDT	Keita (yellow card) 14' (red card) 51' (goal) 31'; Scaglia (yellow card) 24'; Millien 67' (pen.); Barrett 70'; Gallardo (yellow card) 80'	Summary	Moses (yellow card) 38'; Fordyce 62'; Nyassi 65'	Stadium: EverBank Field; Attendance: 6,503; Referee: Daniel Fitzgerald

October 21, 2015 18	Jacksonville Armada	1–3	Ottawa Fury	Jacksonville
19:30 EDT	Jérôme 37'	Summary	Alves 59'; Ubiparipović 62'; Eustáquio (yellow card) 89'; Wiedeman 90'	Stadium: EverBank Field; Attendance: 5,868; Referee: Marcos de Oliveira

October 25, 2015 19	Edmonton	1–1	Jacksonville Armada	Edmonton
15:00 EDT	Jones (yellow card) 12' (yellow-red card) 67'; Roberts 90'	Summary	Bahner (yellow card) 67'; Watson 77' (o.g.)	Stadium: Clarke Stadium; Attendance: 2,730; Referee: Alain Ruch

November 1, 2015 20 Coastal Cup	Jacksonville Armada	0–1	Fort Lauderdale Strikers	Jacksonville
16:00 EDT		Summary	Borrajo (yellow card) 67'; Freitas 87' (yellow card) 88'; Guerrero (yellow card) 90+2'	Stadium: EverBank Field; Attendance: 9,083; Referee: Nima Saghafi

=== U.S. Open Cup ===
May 27, 2015 Third Round	Richmond Kickers	3–0	Jacksonville Armada	Richmond
19:00 EDT	Ownby 20'; Yeisley 38'; Davis IV 51' (pen.)	Summary	Ortiz (yellow card) 21'; Zaldana (yellow card) 45'; Gallardo (yellow card) 51'	Stadium: Richmond City Stadium; Attendance: 1,276; Referee: Matthew Kreitzer

== Squad statistics ==
As of Match played November 1, 2015

=== Appearances and goals ===
No.	Pos	Nat	Player	Total		NASL Spring Season		NASL Fall Season		U.S. Open Cup	
No.	Pos	Nat	Player	Apps	Goals	Apps	Goals	Apps	Goals	Apps	Goals
1	GK	(Mexico) MEX	Miguel Gallardo	23	0	9	0	13	0	1	0
2	DF	(United States) USA	Jordan Gafa	6	0	0+1	0	1+3	0	0+1	0
3	DF	(Argentina) ARG	Lucas Trejo	26	0	10	0	15	0	1	0
4	DF	(Haiti) HAI	Mechack Jérôme	6	1	0	0	6	1	0	0
5	DF	(Bosnia and Herzegovina) BIH	Nurdin Hrustic	12	0	0+5	0	2+5	0	0	0
6	DF	(Argentina) ARG	Fabricio Ortiz	24	0	9	0	13+1	0	1	0
7	MF	(Argentina) ARG	Lucas Rodríguez	20	0	9+1	0	4+6	0	0	0
8	MF	(Argentina) ARG	Bochy Hoyos	19	2	10	2	6+3	0	0	0
9	MF	(Argentina) ARG	Marcos Flores	22	2	10	2	6+6	0	0	0
10	FW	(Guinea) GUI	Alhassane Keita	20	7	6	3	14	4	0	0
11	FW	(United States) USA	Jemal Johnson	29	5	10	3	17+1	2	0+1	0
12	GK	(Spain) ESP	David Sierra	8	0	1	0	7	0	0	0
13	DF	(United States) USA	Matt Bahner	23	0	10	0	12	0	0+1	0
14	MF	(Haiti) HAI	Pascal Millien	25	6	8+2	4	14	2	1	0
15	DF	(Guam) GUM	Shawn Nicklaw	24	0	1+6	0	15+1	0	1	0
16	MF	(Argentina) ARG	Lucas Scaglia	27	1	9	0	17	1	1	0
17	MF	(Colombia) COL	Nicolás Perea	19	0	1+1	0	14+3	0	0	0
18	FW	(Croatia) CRO	Tommy Križanović	17	1	0+4	0	5+7	1	1	0
19	MF	(United States) USA	Nico Zaldana	1	0	0	0	0	0	1	0
20	DF	(Sierra Leone) SLE	Joseph Toby	16	1	0+4	1	6+5	0	1	0
21	MF	(Iran) IRI	Ramak Safi	1	0	0	0	0+1	0	0	0
23	MF	(Colombia) COL	Jaime Castrillón	28	3	7	0	20	3	1	0
25	FW	(United States) USA	Tyler Williams	8	0	0+1	0	3+4	0	0	0
26	FW	(Jamaica) JAM	Akeil Barrett	24	3	0+5	0	10+8	3	1	0
27	FW	(United States) USA	Derek Gebhard	5	0	0	0	0+5	0	0	0
Players who appeared for Jacksonville Armada who left the club during the season:

=== Goal scorers ===
Place	Position	Nation	Number	Name	NASL Spring Season	NASL Fall Season	U.S. Open Cup	Total
1	FW	(Guinea)	10	Alhassane Keita	3	4	0	7
2	MF	(Haiti)	14	Pascal Millien	4	2	0	6
3	FW	(United States)	11	Jemal Johnson	3	2	0	5
4	MF	(Colombia)	23	Jaime Castrillón	0	3	0	3
4	FW	(Jamaica)	26	Akeil Barrett	0	3	0	3
6	MF	(Argentina)	9	Marcos Flores	2	0	0	2
6	MF	(Argentina)	8	Bochy Hoyos	2	0	0	2
8	DF	(Sierra Leone)	20	Joseph Toby	1	0	0	1
8	FW	(Croatia)	18	Tommy Križanović	0	1	0	1
8	MF	(Argentina)	16	Lucas Scaglia	0	1	0	1
8	DF	(Haiti)	4	Mechack Jérôme	0	1	0	1
8				Own goal	0	1	0	1
TOTALS					15	18	0	33

=== Disciplinary record ===
Number	Nation	Position	Name	NASL Spring Season		NASL Fall Season		U.S. Open Cup		Total	
Number	Nation	Position	Name	Yellow card	Red card	Yellow card	Red card	Yellow card	Red card	Yellow card	Red card
1	(Mexico)	GK	Miguel Gallardo	0	0	1	0	1	0	2	0
3	(Argentina)	DF	Lucas Trejo	5	1	1	2	0	0	6	3
4	(Haiti)	DF	Mechack Jérôme	0	0	0	1	0	0	0	1
5	(Bosnia and Herzegovina)	DF	Nurdin Hrustic	1	0	1	0	0	0	2	0
6	(Argentina)	DF	Fabricio Ortiz	6	0	4	0	1	0	11	0
7	(Argentina)	MF	Lucas Rodríguez	0	0	1	0	0	0	1	0
9	(Argentina)	MF	Marcos Flores	1	0	2	0	0	0	3	0
10	(Guinea)	FW	Alhassane Keita	1	0	5	2	0	0	6	2
11	(United States)	FW	Jemal Johnson	2	0	3	0	0	0	5	0
13	(United States)	DF	Matt Bahner	2	0	1	0	0	0	3	0
14	(Haiti)	MF	Pascal Millien	1	0	1	0	0	0	2	0
15	(Guam)	DF	Shawn Nicklaw	1	0	4	1	0	0	5	1
16	(Argentina)	MF	Lucas Scaglia	4	0	7	2	0	0	11	2
17	(Colombia)	MF	Nicolás Perea	1	0	1	0	0	0	2	0
19	(United States)	MF	Nico Zaldana	0	0	0	0	1	0	1	0
20	(Sierra Leone)	DF	Joseph Toby	1	0	0	0	0	0	1	0
23	(Colombia)	MF	Jaime Castrillón	0	0	3	0	0	0	3	0
26	(Jamaica)	FW	Akeil Barrett	0	0	4	0	0	0	4	0
			TOTALS	26	1	39	8	3	0	65	9
