= Alexander Andersson (footballer, born 1985) =

Swedish footballer

Personal information
- Full name: Alexander Andersson
- Date of birth: 14 December 1985 (age 40)
- Place of birth: Sweden
- Height: 1.84 m (6 ft 0 in)
- Position: Forward

Youth career
- –2008: Åtorps

Senior career*
Years	Team	Apps	(Gls)
2008	Åtorps IF		
2009–2010	Karlskoga		
2011–2016	Degerfors	103	(22)
2016	Jacksonville Armada	4	(0)
2017–2018	Degerfors	47	(8)
- * Club domestic league appearances and goals as of 18 February 2019

Alexander Andersson (born 14 December 1985) is a Swedish retired footballer who played as a forward.

== Career ==
In June 2016, Andersson signed for NASL side Jacksonville Armada FC, returning to Degerfors prior to the start of the 2017 Superettan season.

Andersson retired after the 2018 season.

== Career statistics ==
As of match played 7 August 2016

Appearances and goals by club, season and competition
Club	Season	League			National Cup		Continental		Other		Total	
Club	Season	Division	Apps	Goals	Apps	Goals	Apps	Goals	Apps	Goals	Apps	Goals
Degerfors	2011	Superettan	18	2	1	0	–		–		19	2
Degerfors	2012	Superettan	21	5	0	0	–		–		21	5
Degerfors	2013	Superettan	24	10	1	0	–		–		25	10
Degerfors	2014	Superettan	9	1	3	0	–		–		12	1
Degerfors	2015	Superettan	18	2	1	0	–		–		19	2
Degerfors	2016	Superettan	13	2	2	0	–		–		15	2
Degerfors	Total		103	22	8	0	-	-	-	-	111	22
Jacksonville Armada	2016	NASL	4	0	0	0	–		–		4	0
Career total			107	22	8	0	-	-	-	-	115	22
