= Lucas Scaglia =

Argentine footballer (born 1987)

Personal information
- Full name: Lucas Scaglia
- Date of birth: 6 May 1987 (age 39)
- Place of birth: Rosario, Argentina
- Height: 1.68 m (5 ft 6 in)
- Position: Midfielder

Youth career
- Newell's Old Boys

Senior career*
Years	Team	Apps	(Gls)
2006–2008	Newell's Old Boys	4	(0)
2008	Terrassa	4	(0)
2008–2009	PAS Giannina	0	(0)
2009–2010	Panserraikos	27	(2)
2010–2011	Trikala	1	(0)
2011	AEL Kalloni	7	(0)
2012	Bolívar	6	(0)
2012–2013	Once Caldas	32	(0)
2013–2014	Deportivo Cali	18	(4)
2014–2015	Rijeka	0	(0)
2014–2015	→ Rijeka II	12	(0)
2015–2016	Jacksonville Armada	41	(2)
2017–2018	California United FC II	20	(2)
2019	Las Vegas Lights	9	(0)
- * Club domestic league appearances and goals as of 8 August 2019

Lucas Scaglia (born 6 May 1987) is an Argentine football coach and former footballer who played as a midfielder. He grew up with Lionel Messi and today is his cousin-in-law.

== Career ==
Scaglia signed for North American Soccer League side Jacksonville Armada on 30 January 2015, leaving the club at the end of the 2016 season.

In 2017, Scaglia joined California United FC II where he was a key member of the team which captured both the 2017 Spring & Fall United Premier Soccer League National Championships.

On 9 January 2019, Scaglia joined USL Championship side Las Vegas Lights.

== Personal life ==
Scaglia is a childhood friend of Lionel Messi. It was in their youth that Messi met Scaglia's cousin Antonela Roccuzzo who he would eventually marry in 2017.

== Career statistics ==
=== Club ===
As of match played 30 October 2016

Appearances and goals by club, season and competition
Club	Season	League			National Cup		Continental		Other		Total	
Club	Season	Divisions	As	Goals	Apps	Goals	Apps	Goals	Apps	Goals	Apps	Goals
Jacksonville Armada	2015	NASL	26	1	1	0	-		-		27	1
Jacksonville Armada	2016	NASL	15	1	1	0	-		-		16	1
Jacksonville Armada	Total		41	2	2	0	-	-	-	-	43	2
Career total			41	2	2	0	-	-	-	-	43	2
