= Jason Plumhoff =

American-German soccer player

Personal information
- Date of birth: August 9, 1991 (age 35)
- Place of birth: Rosenheim, Bavaria, Germany
- Height: 1.82 m (6 ft 0 in)
- Position: Midfielder

Youth career
- 2002–2004: Bayern Munich
- 2004–2006: SpVgg Unterhaching

College career
| Years | Team | Apps | (Gls) |
| 2010–2013 | La Salle Explorers | 73 | (27) |

Senior career*
| Years | Team | Apps | (Gls) |
| 2012 | Ocean City Nor'easters | 15 | (2) |
| 2013 | Reading United AC | 14 | (4) |
| 2015 | Harrisburg City Islanders | 22 | (10) |
| 2016 | FC Edmonton | 6 | (1) |
| 2016 | Jacksonville Armada FC | 5 | (0) |
| 2016 | → Saint Louis FC (loan) | 5 | (0) |
| 2017 | Indy Eleven | 6 | (1) |
| 2017 | Harrisburg City Islanders | 1 | (0) |
- * Club domestic league appearances and goals as of September 25, 2017

Jason Plumhoff (born August 9, 1991) is a German-American former professional soccer player.

== Early life ==
Plumhoff was born in Rosenheim, Germany to American parents who had settled in southern Bavaria. He lived in Germany until the age of 15, playing in the Bayern Munich and SpVgg Unterhaching youth systems. His father, who worked for the U.S. government, was then relocated to Fort Meade, Maryland.

== Playing career ==
=== College and amateur ===
Plumhoff played college soccer at La Salle University between 2010 and 2013. In 2013, he was named Atlantic 10 Conference Offensive Player of the Year, Philadelphia Soccer 6 Player of the Year, NSCAA All-Region First Team and ECAC All-Star.

While at college, Plumhoff appeared for USL PDL club Ocean City Nor'easters in 2012, and played with fellow PDL club Reading United AC in 2013.

=== Harrisburg City ===
Plumhoff signed with United Soccer League club Harrisburg City Islanders on March 24, 2015. Jason finished the season as the Islanders leading scorer with 10 goals.

=== Edmonton ===
Plumhoff joined Canadian club FC Edmonton on February 25, 2016. Plumhoff scored his first NASL goal in a 2–1 victory over the New York Cosmos on May 15, 2016.

FC Edmonton traded Plumhoff to Jacksonville Armada FC in exchange for defender Shawn Nicklaw on July 6, 2016.

=== Jacksonville ===
Plumhoff, who came to Jacksonville on July 6 from NASL club FC Edmonton in a trade for Shawn Nicklaw, has made five appearances, including two starts, with the Armada.

=== Saint Louis FC ===
The Jacksonville Armada FC announced on Friday it has sent midfielder Jason Plumhoff to United Soccer League side Saint Louis FC on a four-week loan.

=== Indy Eleven ===
Plumhoff joined Indy Eleven on May 5 and went on to make 6 appearances, scoring 1 goal against former club FC Edmonton.

=== Return to Harrisburg ===
Plumhoff re-signed with United Soccer League club Harrisburg City Islanders on July 21, 2017.
