= Travis Nicklaw =

American-born Guamanian soccer player

Personal information
- Full name: Travis James Nicklaw
- Date of birth: December 21, 1993 (age 32)
- Place of birth: San Diego, California, United States
- Height: 6 ft 3 in (1.91 m)
- Position: Defender

Youth career
- –2008: San Diego Nomads
- 2008–2012: Notts Forest Club

College career
Years	Team	Apps	(Gls)
2012–2016	San Diego State Aztecs	48	(3)

Senior career*
Years	Team	Apps	(Gls)
2015	FC Tucson	5	(2)
2017	Albion SC Pros	19	(2)
2017–2018	Canterbury United FC	14	(3)
2018–2019	Völsungur	20	(0)
2020	Chattanooga Red Wolves	7	(0)
2023	Chattanooga Red Wolves	9	(0)
Total		138	(18)

International career^{‡}
2012–2023	Guam	39	(1)
- * Club domestic league appearances and goals as of 16 October 2023 ‡ National team caps and goals as of 13 June 2021

Travis James Nicklaw (born December 21, 1993) is an American-born Guamanian former soccer player who played as a defender.

== Career ==
=== Albion SC Pros ===
As forward for the San Diego–based Albion PROS, was named Mitre National Player of the Week (April 2017) by the National Premier Soccer League in a vote of media members from across the nation. A San Diego native, Nicklaw scored a goal and added an assist, leading Albion to a 3–1 triumph over Corinthians USA on April 1 in a match at Mission Bay High School.

=== Canterbury United FC ===
On 7 September 2017, he joined Canterbury United FC in the ISPS Handa Premiership.

=== Völsungur ===
In April 2018, Travis joined Icelandic club Völsungur.

=== Chattanooga Red Wolves ===
Ahead of the 2020 USL League One season, Nicklaw signed with Chattanooga Red Wolves SC for the 2020 season.

He returned to Chattanooga on 24 March 2023, signing a short-term deal with the club.

== Amateur ==
Nicklaw is a three-star recruit by Top Drawer Soccer and was a member of the U.S. Soccer Development Academy between 2008 and 2010. Nicklaw starred for the Notts Forest Club team where he helped lead the club to its first National Cup Championship. He also played at University City High School where he led the Centurions to a 15–1–2 (.889) record as a senior. As a junior, Nicklaw had 18 points on seven goals and 11 assists, and helped University City to the CIF Championship title. He was one of the top kickers in San Diego County and was a highly rated football prospect. He won the FG competition at the Western Showcase Camp in December 2011, as he made a 60-yard FG without any wind behind him. Nicklaw also lettered four years in track and field for the men's 4×100 relay.

== College ==
=== Collegiate Honors ===
- NCAA All-Far West Region Second-Team (Dec. 6th, 2016)
- All-Pac-12 Second-Team (Nov. 15th, 2016)
- Pac-12 Player of the Week (Oct. 4th, 2016)
- Pac-12 Player of the Week (Sep. 27th, 2016)
- Top Drawer Soccer Team of the week (Sep. 6th, 2016)
- All-Pac-12 Honorable Mention (2015)
- Top Drawer Soccer Goal of the Year (2015)
- Top Drawer Soccer Freshman Top 100 (2012)

=== San Diego State University ===
He ranked 26th in the nation in the Top 100 Freshmen by Top Drawer.

In his inaugural campaign on Montezuma Mesa, Nicklaw started on 10 occasions and saw action in 17 contests. He was the lone true freshman to start a game for the Aztecs in 2012. Nicklaw is registered with the Aztecs as a midfielder and forward; however, his size has proven valuable for the Aztecs’ back-line. he continued to finish off the season seeing time in the center midfield as well as playing forward. The midfielder tallied six shot attempts on the season, with two on goal. He is one of just five players from the Pac-12 in the top 50 and is the only player in the top 100 from San Diego. In 2014 Nicklaw scored a goal and playing in 18 games.

During the 2015 preseason Nicklaw signed with FC Tucson in the USL Premier Development League playing both defense and forward. During the regular Pac-12 season, he commanded the San Diego State defense which posted the league's third-most clean sheets (seven) and the fourth-lowest goals against average (1.29). Nicklaw also saw playing time as a forward earning two goals and posting six points; finishing fourth on the Aztecs. Despite missing five matches due to international commitments, Nicklaw finished the season collecting Pac-12 honorable mention and also Pac-12's "#12best" moments week October 19–25.

In 2016 during the Aztec's home opener, redshirt senior Travis scored on a penalty kick in the 61st minute to lift then No. 23 San Diego State over the No. 1 ranked Akron. The win ranks among the SDSU's men soccer program as one of the biggest victories since their run to the 1987 NCAA final. No team in men or women's division one sports at SDSU's had previously beat another No. 1 ranked team in its history.

Travis Nicklaw who earned all-Pac-12 honorable mention as a defender in 2015, moved to forward during 2016 and led the team with five goals during the regular season. While playing forward he tied for fifth in the Pac-12 conference, and tied for the league lead with 29 shots and 2.90 shots per contest. Four of his five tallies were game-winners in victories over No. 1 Akron (Sept. 2), crosstown foe San Diego (Sept. 25), No. 16 Washington (Oct. 2) and California (Oct. 23). At the end of the regular season Travis earned: NCAA All-Far West Region Second-Team, All Pac-12 Second-team, was selected as Pac-12 Player of the Week on two occasions and earned a spot on the Top Drawer Soccer National Team of the Week on Sept 6.

== International ==
In November 2012, Nicklaw confirmed he would be representing Guam at international level under head coach Gary White. Nicklaw played with the Matao, including the East Asian Cup semifinal round, in Hong Kong (2012) and AFC Challenge qualifier in Yangon, Myanmar (2013). During the AFC Challenge Nicklaw helped the Matao achieve their first win in its history against the Chinese Taipei. Nicklaw contribution has helped Guam to reach their highest FIFA ranking to date.

In July 2014 while playing alongside his older brother Shawn Nicklaw, Nicklaw helped Guam finish first within the Preliminary round 1 EAFF East Asian cup tournament advancing to the semifinal round for the third-straight time. Earlier in the year he played international friendlies against Aruba.

== 2018 World Cup qualification ==
On June 11, 2015, Nicklaw helped Guam achieve a historic first FIFA World Cup qualifying match win against Turkmenistan, 1–0. A few days later he scored his first international goal, while assisted by his brother Shawn Nicklaw, against India during their second match in the FIFA 2018 World Cup qualifier Group D round. The win was notable considering India's FIFA rankings sits 33 spots ahead at No. 141, their population is over one billion and was dubbed the sleeping giants of football by FIFA.

== Personal life ==
Travis is the younger brother of Shawn Nicklaw, who previously played for NASL club FC Edmonton. They have both been capped for the Guam national team.

== International goals ==
Score and result list Guam's goals first

#	Date	Venue	Opponent	Score	Result	Competition	Reference
1	16 June 2015	Guam National Football Stadium, Hagatna, Guam	India	2–0	2–1	FIFA World Cup Qualification	

=== Honors ===
- Mitre National Player of the Week (April 2017)
