= Chaim Roserie =

Saint Lucian footballer

Personal information
- Full name: Chaim Roserie
- Date of birth: 9 September 1998 (age 28)
- Place of birth: Mississauga, Ontario, Canada
- Height: 1.67 m (5 ft 6 in)
- Position: Forward

Youth career
- Mississauga Falcons
- West Toronto SC
- 2015–2016: Jacksonville Armada

College career
Years	Team	Apps	(Gls)
2017	Eastern Florida Titans		
2020	Florida Tech Panthers		
2021–2022	Temple Owls	24	(11)

Senior career*
Years	Team	Apps	(Gls)
2018–2019	Alcoyano	0	(0)
2018	→ Novelda (loan)	4	(0)
2019	La Nucía	8	(3)
2019	La Nucía B	14	(10)

International career^{‡}
2019–	Saint Lucia	8	(0)
- * Club domestic league appearances and goals as of 21 June 2024 ‡ National team caps and goals as of 14 June 2022

Chaim Roserie (born 9 September 1998) is a professional footballer who plays as a forward. Born in Canada, he plays for the Saint Lucia national team.

== Club career ==
Having played youth football in Canada for Mississauga Falcons and West Toronto Cobras, Roserie joined North American Soccer League side Jacksonville Armada in May 2015.

After a spell at an academy in Spain, Roserie joined Segunda División B side Alcoyano in August 2018. Two weeks later, he joined Tercera División side Novelda on loan for the rest of 2018. In January 2019, Roserie joined fellow Tercera División side La Nucía, this time on a permanent deal where he played for both the first team and the club's B team in Regional Preferente.

In 2020, he enrolled at college, first at the Florida Institute of Technology and then at Temple University where he gained the opportunity to play at the NCAA Division I level. Roseire played in 12 games and started four. Roserie scored one goal and passed for an assist in his first season with Temple.

== International career ==
In September 2019, Roserie was called up to the Saint Lucia national team for their CONCACAF Nations League matches against El Salvador and Montserrat. On 8 September 2019, Roserie made his senior international debut, coming on as a substitute in the 3–0 loss to El Salvador. As of June 14, 2022, Roserie has capped seven games, including two Nations League wins to move Saint Lucia to Group B.
