= David Sierra (footballer) =

Spanish footballer

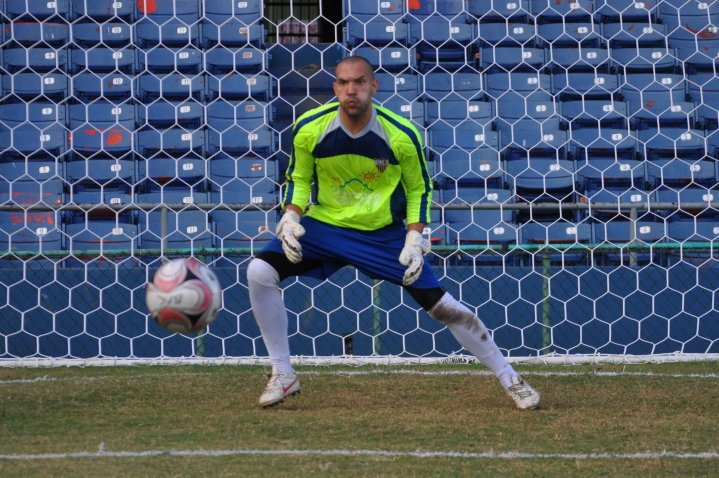

Personal information
- Full name: David Sierra Manzanares
- Date of birth: September 16, 1983 (age 43)
- Place of birth: Madrid, Spain
- Height: 1.85 m (6 ft 1 in)
- Position: Goalkeeper

Youth career
- 1993–1997: Rayo Vallecano
- 1997–2002: Real Madrid

Senior career*
Years	Team	Apps	(Gls)
2002–2004	Real Madrid C		
2004–2007	Ponferradina	7	(0)
2007–2009	Fuenlabrada	54	(0)
2009–2010	Arganda	15	(0)
2010	Bayamón	7	(0)
2010–2011	Sevilla Puerto Rico	3	(0)
2011–2012	Victoria		
2012–2015	Puerta Bonita	47	(0)
2015	Jacksonville Armada FC	8	(0)
2016	Miami FC	0	(0)
- * Club domestic league appearances and goals as of 11:41, 4 August 2016 (UTC)

David Sierra Manzanares (born 16 September 1983) is a Spanish soccer player who plays as a goalkeeper.

== Career ==
Born in Madrid, Sierra finished his graduation with Real Madrid, after starting it out with Rayo Vallecano. He made his senior debuts with the former's C-team in the 2002–03 season, in Tercera División. In the 2004 summer Sierra first arrived in Segunda División B, signing with SD Ponferradina; he eventually appeared four times in his first two seasons combined, the being promoted in the second.

On 20 September 2006 Sierra made his professional debut, starting in a 0–1 away loss against Elche CF, for the season's Copa del Rey. His Segunda División debut came on 3 June of the following year, in a 0–4 away loss against CD Castellón; he eventually played the other two matches, with Ponfe already relegated.

In the 2007 summer Sierra joined CF Fuenlabrada, in the third level. However, after suffering another relegation in his first season, he joined AD Arganda in the fourth level in 2009.

In March 2010 Sierra moved abroad for the first time of his career, signing with Bayamón FC, appearing in that year's CFU Club Championship, eventually finishing fourth and missing out the CONCACAF Champions League. In October, he joined Sevilla FC's Puerto Rican subsidiary, but only appeared sparingly.

In July 2011 Sierra signed with Liga Nacional de Fútbol Profesional de Honduras side CD Victoria. A season later he returned to Spain, signing with CD Puerta Bonita in the fourth division.

On January 29, 2015, Sierra joined the Jacksonville Armada along with Pascal Millien. Sierra was released by Jacksonville in November 2015.

Following his release from the Armada, Sierra joined the expansion Miami FC on December 23, 2015. Sierra was released by Miami FC on July 28, 2016.
