= Garry Lewis (soccer) =

American soccer player and coach

Personal information
- Full name: Garry Lee Lewis
- Date of birth: August 26, 1986 (age 40)
- Place of birth: Orange Park, Florida, United States
- Height: 5 ft 10 in (1.78 m)
- Position: Midfielder

College career
Years	Team	Apps	(Gls)
2005	St. John's Red Storm		
2006–2008	North Carolina Tar Heels		

Senior career*
Years	Team	Apps	(Gls)
2009	Carolina Dynamo	5	(2)
2009	Real Maryland Monarchs	7	(0)
2009–2010	Ekenäs IF	17	(7)
2011	SalPa	10	(1)
2012	Ekenäs IF	19	(5)
2016	Jacksonville Armada	0	(0)
2016	→ Tulsa Roughnecks (loan)	5	(0)

Managerial career
- TPS Reserves
- 2020–: Cumberlands Patriots (asst.)
- * Club domestic league appearances and goals as of March 14, 2021

Garry Lewis (born August 26, 1986, in Orange Park, Florida) is an American retired soccer player who is currently an assistant coach at the University of the Cumberlands.

== Career ==
=== Youth and college ===
Lewis attended Orange Park High School, played club soccer for the Clay County Soccer Club and West Kendall.

As a youth player Lewis was a Three-Time NSCAA/adidas Youth American. In 2005/04 he was First Team All-State for the State of Florida, and in 2003 as a sophomore in high school he was named "Gatorade State Player of the Year". Lewis also won two Super Y-League National Championships while playing for West Kendall Optimist in 2005 and in 2006.

After his first season of college soccer while at St. John's Red Storm, Lewis earned a spot on the 2005 Big East All-Freshmen First Team, and Nationally All-Freshmen by College Soccer News Third Team.

Upon transferring to the University of North Carolina at Chapel Hill Lewis' sophomore year, he became an impact starter. He earned the team's "Most Competitive Player Award" that same year. During his senior season Lewis lead his Tarheels as a team "co-captain" to the NCAA National Finals in Frisco, Texas against Maryland. They lost the game one to zero.

As a Tarheel Lewis tallied 11 goals and 5 assists, and in his senior season he scored the game winner in the Sweet Sixteen to put his team into the Elite Eight.

Lewis also played for Carolina Dynamo in the USL Premier Development League.

=== Professional ===
Lewis was signed by the Real Maryland Monarchs in the USL Second Division following the conclusion of the 2009 PDL season, and made his professional debut on July 11, 2009, in Maryland's 2–1 win over the Pittsburgh Riverhounds. After his department by Real Maryland Monarchs joined in October 2009 to Ekenäs Idrottsförening.
