= Shawn Nicklaw =

Guamanian footballer (born 1989)

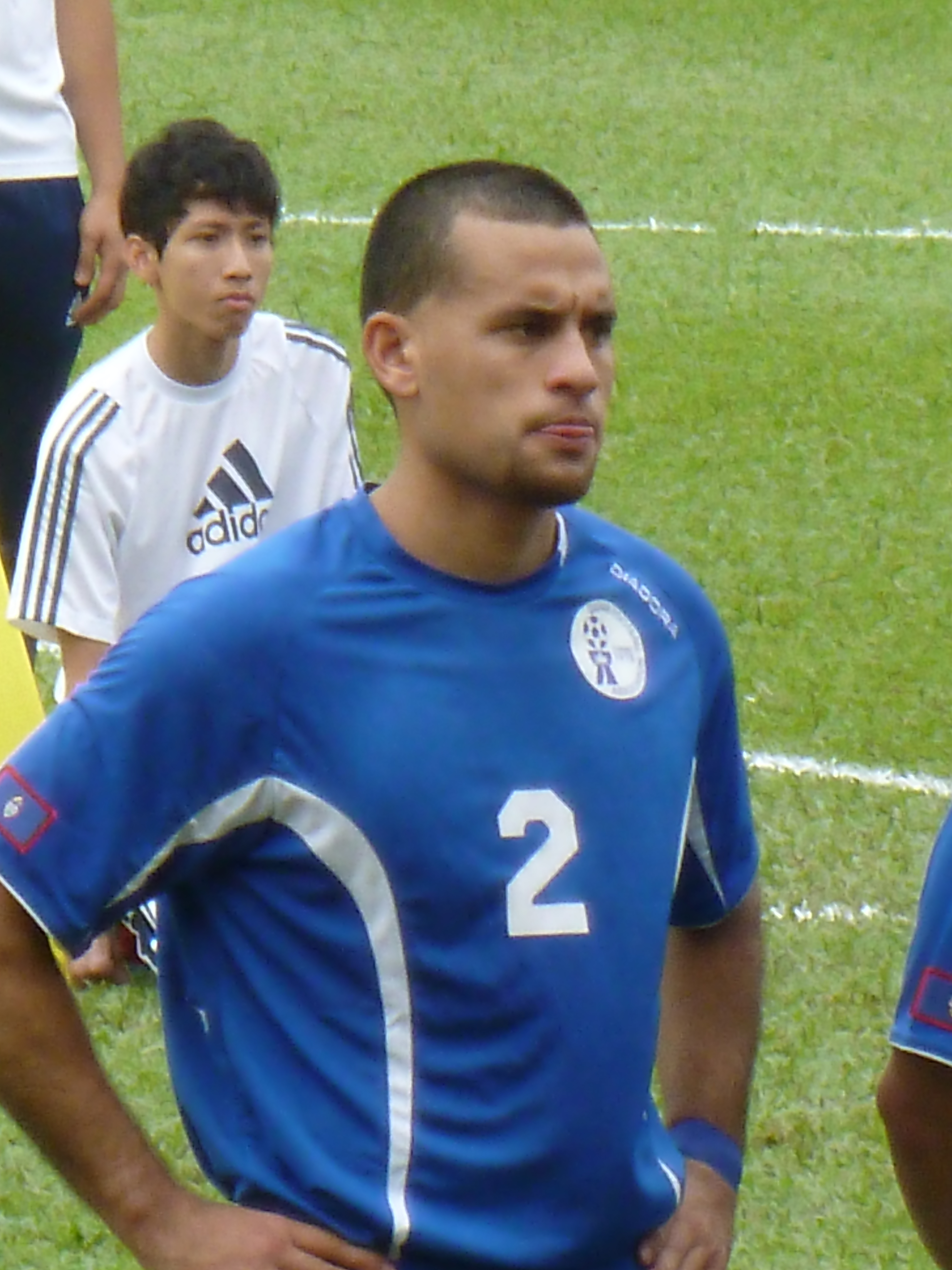

Personal information
- Full name: Shawn Robert Nicklaw
- Date of birth: April 15, 1989 (age 37)
- Place of birth: San Diego, California, United States
- Height: 6 ft 0 in (1.83 m)
- Positions: Defender; defensive midfielder

Youth career
- 2006–2007: San Diego Nomads

College career
Years	Team	Apps	(Gls)
2007–2010	UConn Huskies	80	(2)

Senior career*
Years	Team	Apps	(Gls)
2012–2013	HB Køge	6	(0)
2013	Wilmington Hammerheads	21	(1)
2014	Thór	16	(4)
2015–2016	Jacksonville Armada	29	(1)
2016–2017	FC Edmonton	50	(0)
2018	Atlanta United 2	21	(1)
Total		222	(8)

International career^{‡}
2012–2021	Guam	35	(2)

Managerial career
- 2021–: Saint Mary's Gaels (assistant)
- * Club domestic league appearances and goals as of November 18, 2018 ‡ National team caps and goals as of June 13, 2021

Shawn Robert Nicklaw (born April 15, 1989) is a Guamanian retired professional soccer player who is currently an assistant coach for the Saint Mary's Gaels men's soccer team. Nicklaw played as an offensively oriented right-back.

== Career ==
=== Amateur ===
Nicklaw played with the Nomads Soccer Club, earning the 2007 Red Bull National League Championship. During high school, he helped lead his team to the 2005 California Interscholastic Federation Championship and the 2005, 2006 and 2007 Eastern League Championships. Shawn also lettered two years in track and field for the Men's 400m.

=== College ===
Nicklaw played college soccer at the University of Connecticut between 2007 and 2010. During his time at UConn, he played 80 games, scored 2 goals, 7 assist, 39 shots, 12 shots on goal and 1 game-winning goal.

== Professional ==
=== HB Køge ===
Nicklaw signed a two-year contract with the professional Danish football club beginning July 1, 2012. HB Køge played in the Danish Superliga, the highest division in Denmark, during the 2011–2012 season.

=== Wilmington Hammerheads ===
In 2013 Nicklaw transferred back to the United States where he played for the Wilmington Hammerheads in the USL Pro.

=== Þór Akureyri ===
Nicklaw signed with Icelandic Premier League club Thór in April 2014. Shawn's National team experience and ability to play multiple positions gives Thór options.

=== Jacksonville Armada FC ===
Nicklaw signed for Jacksonville Armada in December 2014, prior to their inaugural season.

In two seasons with the Armada FC, Nicklaw played in 29 league matches as a fullback, including 21 starts, and notched 10 shots in 1,937 minutes of action. A member of the Guam national team, he also started in two of Jacksonville's U.S. Open Cup matches – Richmond Kickers (May 29, 2015) and Charleston Battery (June 1, 2016). Nicklaw scored the first goal in Community First Park history in the Armada FC's 1–0 preseason win over the Fort Lauderdale Strikers on Feb. 28, 2015.

=== FC Edmonton ===
On 6 July 2016, Nicklaw was traded to FC Edmonton in return for Jason Plumhoff.

During his debut for the Eddies, Shawn won four duels, made three clearances, and had two interceptions as FC Edmonton kept a shutout in a 1–0 win over the Fort Lauderdale Strikers earning him a spot on NASL's team of the week (Week 2 of the NASL Fall Season 2016).

== International ==
In November 2012, Nicklaw confirmed he would be representing Guam at International level. Matao head coach Gary White was introduced to Nicklaw by a personal contact in San Diego. Nicklaw played with the Matao, including the East Asian Cup semifinal round, in Hong Kong (2012) and AFC Challenge qualifier in Yangon, Myanmar (2013). During the AFC Challenge Nicklaw helped the Matao achieve their first win in its history against the Chinese Taipei. Nicklaw's contribution has helped Guam to reach their highest FIFA ranking to date.

In 2014, Nicklaw scored his first international goal against Northern Mariana Islands in the Preliminary round 1 EAFF East Asian cup. Guam finished first within the tournament advancing to the semifinal round for the third-straight time.

=== 2018 World Cup Qualification ===
In 2015 Nicklaw helped Guam achieve a historic first FIFA World Cup qualifying match win against Turkmenistan 1–0. A few days later he assisted his brother Travis Nicklaw, who scored the winning goal, clinching a second FIFA World Cup qualifying match victory over India during their second match in the FIFA 2018 World Cup qualifier Group D round. The win was notable considering India's FIFA rankings sits 33 spots ahead at No. 141, their population is in the billions and was dubbed the sleeping giants of football by FIFA.

=== International goals ===
Score and Result lists Guam's goals first

No.	Date	Venue	Opponent	Score	Result	Competition	Ref.
1.	31 March 2015	Jalan Besar Stadium, Jalan Besar, Singapore	Singapore	1–0	2–2	Friendly	

=== Non-FIFA goals ===
Score and Result lists Guam's goals first

No.	Date	Venue	Opponent	Score	Result	Competition	Ref.
1.	25 July 2014	GFA National Training Center, Harmon, Guam	Northern Mariana Islands	4–0	5–0	2015 EAFF East Asian Cup	Deprecated link archived August 5, 2014, at archive.today

== Coaching ==
In July 2021, Nicklaw joined the coaching staff at Saint Mary's College of California as an assistant.
