= Nurdin Hrustic =

Bosnian-Herzegovinian retired footballer (born 1988)

Personal information
- Date of birth: November 5, 1988 (age 37)
- Place of birth: Zvornik, Bosnia and Herzegovina, Yugoslavia
- Height: 1.93 m (6 ft 4 in)
- Position: Defender

Youth career
- SG Düren 99
- NK Zvijezda Gradačac

College career
Years	Team	Apps	(Gls)
2008–2009	Jacksonville Dolphins		

Senior career*
Years	Team	Apps	(Gls)
2009–2012	VfL Bochum II	47	(1)
2012–2013	KFC Uerdingen 05 II	1	(1)
2014	Jacksonville United	7	(1)
2015	Jacksonville Armada FC	11	(0)

International career
2008–2009	Bosnia & Herzegovina U21		
- * Club domestic league appearances and goals as of February 4, 2016

Nurdin Hrustic (born November 5, 1988) is a Bosnian retired footballer who last played for Jacksonville Armada FC in the North American Soccer League.

== Club career ==
Hrustic played one year of college soccer at Jacksonville University in 2008 and 2009, before joining the youth side of VfL Bochum, where he played until 2011. He spent a season with KFC Uerdingen 05, before moving back to the United States where trialled with USL Pro side Charleston Battery and eventually signed with NPSL club Jacksonville United in 2014.

Hrustic signed with North American Soccer League club Jacksonville Armada on January 14, 2015. He was released on February 4, 2016.

== Personal life ==
He now works as a Mortgage Loan Processor in Jacksonville.
