= José Luis Villarreal =

Argentine footballer & coach (born 1966)

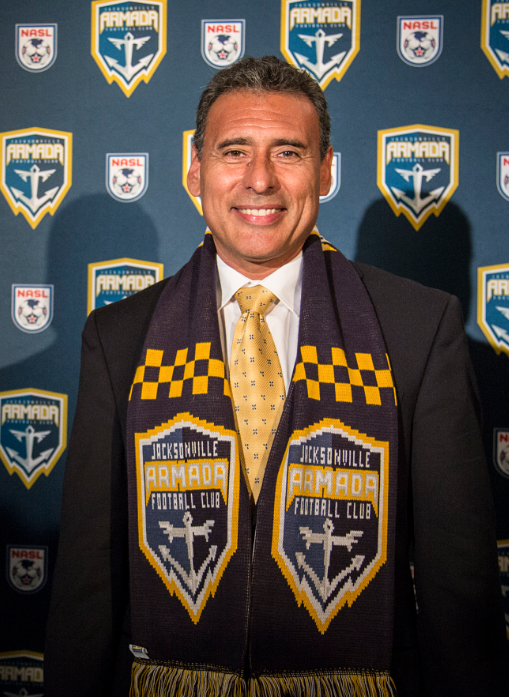

Personal information
- Full name: José Luis Villarreal
- Date of birth: 17 March 1966 (age 60)
- Place of birth: Córdoba, Argentina
- Height: 5 ft 10 in (1.78 m)
- Position: Central midfielder

Senior career*
Years	Team	Apps	(Gls)
1986–1987	Club Atlético Belgrano	4	(0)
1987–1992	Boca Juniors	102	(8)
1993	Atlético de Madrid	5	(0)
1993–1995	River Plate	12	(2)
1995–1996	Montpellier	29	(3)
1997	C.F. Pachuca	15	(0)
1997–1998	Estudiantes	25	(4)
1998–2000	Club Atlético Belgrano	49	(3)
2000–2001	All Boys	0	(0)
2002–2004	Club Atlético Belgrano	0	(0)

International career
1991–1993	Argentina	8	(0)

Managerial career
- 2015: Jacksonville Armada
Medal record
Men's football
Representing Argentina
FIFA Confederations Cup
Winner	1992 Saudi Arabia
- * Club domestic league appearances and goals

José Luis Villarreal (born 17 March 1966) is an Argentine association football coach and former player. He is the new coach of the newborn Miami Beach Club de Fútbol, that will play in the United Premier Soccer League. He is the former head coach of Jacksonville Armada FC of the North American Soccer League. He is also the owner of Homestead SC, a soccer academy in Homestead, Florida as he is frequently mentioned by their social media page and in their website.

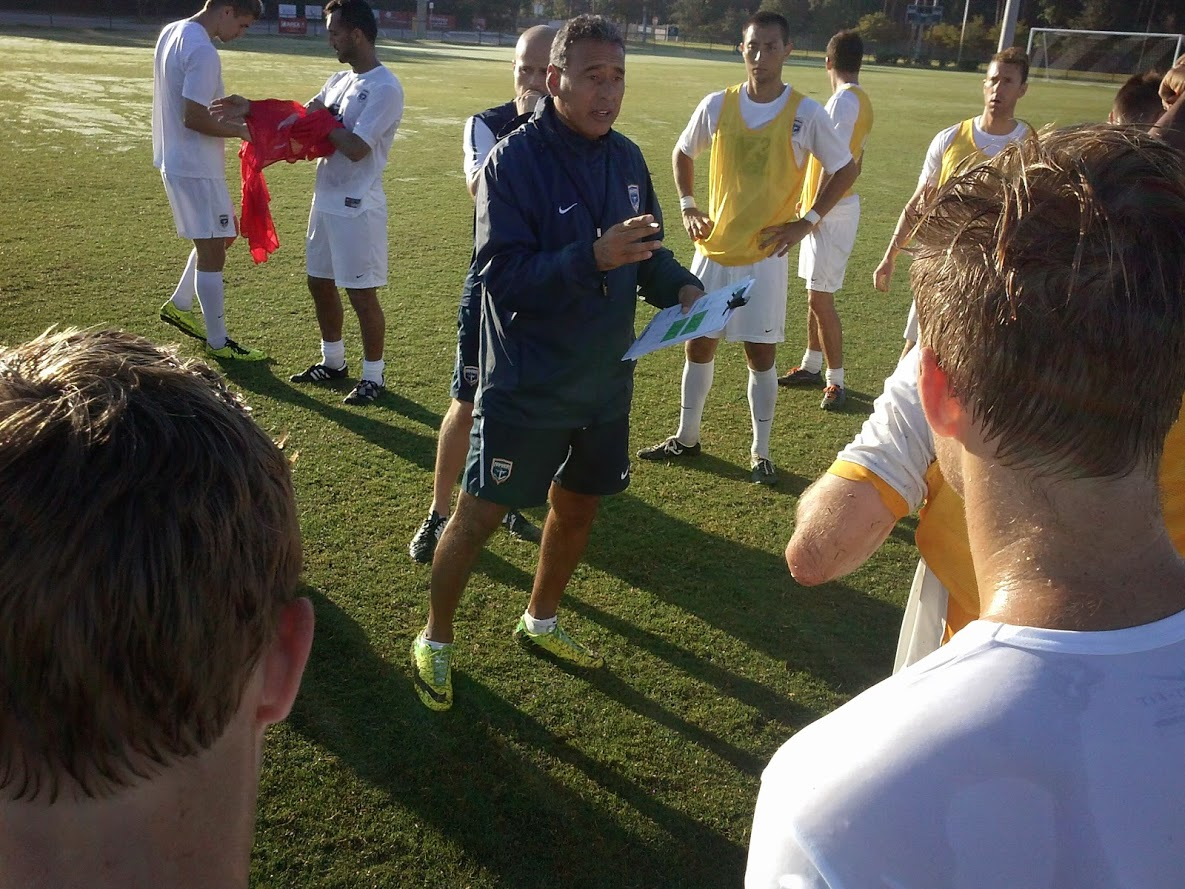
Coach Villarreal at the Armanda FC Development Camps

Villarreal was part of the Argentina squad at the 1992 King Fahd Cup in Saudi Arabia and usually played in midfield. He has played for clubs in Argentina, Mexico, France, and Spain, spending the majority of his time with Buenos Aires club Boca Juniors and hometown Club Atlético Belgrano in Córdoba. His eye for talent has led him to the scouting and recruiting of some of South America's top football talent, namely fellow Argentine Lionel Messi.

== Club career ==
Born in Córdoba, Córdoba Province, Villarreal began playing football with local side San Lorenzo de Las Flores at age 16. He signed with Club Atlético Belgrano where he would play two seasons before moving to Boca Juniors. He won the 1992 championship in his five-year stint with Boca Juniors. The following year he signed for Boca's arch-rivals River Plate, where he played from 1993 to 1995.

Villarreal played one season in France at Montpellier before moving to Mexican side C.F. Pachuca during the 1997 season. Reoccurring injuries forced Villarreal to return to Argentina where he played for his home side Belgrano in 1998. He played in Argentina for the remainder of his career and after a short stint at Estudiantes he returned once more before retiring with Belgrano in 2004.

== International career ==
Villarreal showcased some brilliant midfield work in eight different international appearances with the Argentina national team, the most successful being an International Championship at the 1992 King Fahd Cup, later to be known as the Confederations Cup. Despite an absence of contributing goals during his international career, Villarreal played an instrumental part in the defeat of Saudi Arabia in the first addition of what would become the Confederations Cup.

== Coaching career ==
In 2012, Villarreal was brought to Chilean club Colo-Colo as part of Omar Labruna coaching staff, serving as the deputy manager and training coach for the club. In June 2014, Jacksonville Armada FC, a team in the North American Soccer League based in Jacksonville, Florida, announced it had hired Villarreal as the team's inaugural head coach. He parted ways with the club in June 2015. In October 2019 he becomes the first coach of the Miami Beach Club de Futbol, the first and only professional team of the city of Miami Beach

== Recruiting ==
From 2005 to 2007 Villarreal worked as President of the Academy REDH (Rumbo has Excelencia y Deportiva Humana) where he and Venezuelan academy founder Guillermo Ángel Hoyos recruited top South American talent, most notably Lionel Messi. The program offered a comprehensive educational academy that accompanied advanced football training programs enabled the best South American footballers the opportunity to play in the best clubs in Europe and around the world. Along with his colleagues, Villarreal has managed to place many of the most talented students in the best Spanish, French, Greek, and Italian clubs.

== Personal life ==
Villarreal goes by the nickname "Villa" which was chanted during his days playing at La Bombonera with Boca Juniors. He lives with his wife Elizabeth, daughter Sofia, son Lucas and dog Milo in Córdoba, Argentina, soon moving to Homestead, Florida as he coaches and directs his new soccer academy.

== Honours ==
Belgrano

- Torneo Regional: 1986

Boca Juniors

- Argentine Primera División: 1992 Apertura

River Plate

- Argentine Primera División: 1993 Apertura, 1994 Apertura

Argentina

- FIFA Confederations Cup: 1992
