= Akeil Barrett =

Jamaican footballer (born 1992)

Personal information
- Date of birth: 7 July 1992 (age 34)
- Place of birth: Kingston, Jamaica
- Height: 5 ft 7 in (1.70 m)
- Positions: Forward; winger

Youth career
- Meadhaven United
- Harbour View

College career
Years	Team	Apps	(Gls)
2011	Akron Zips	9	(2)
2012–2014	Tulsa Golden Hurricane	52	(20)

Senior career*
Years	Team	Apps	(Gls)
2014	Tulsa Athletics	6	(4)
2015	Orlando City	0	(0)
2015	Jacksonville Armada	23	(3)
2016	Piteå IF	17	(2)
2016	Swope Park Rangers	5	(1)
2017	Ocean City Nor'easters	10	(1)
2018	Hoppers		
2019	Tulsa Roughnecks	8	(0)
Total		69+	(11+)
- * Club domestic league appearances and goals as of 16 July 2019

Akeil Barrett (born 7 July 1992) is a Jamaican former professional footballer.

== Career ==
=== College and Youth ===
Barrett began his college soccer career at the University of Akron in 2011, before transferring to the University of Tulsa in 2012. He started in 46 of 54 games compiling 20 goals and 14 assists for 54 career points in his career at Tulsa. He helped lead the team to two conference championships.

While at college, Barrett played with NPSL club Tulsa Athletics during their 2014 season, where he scored 4 goals in 6 appearances.

=== Professional ===
On 15 January 2015, Barrett was selected 25th overall in the 2015 MLS SuperDraft by Orlando City SC. He signed with Orlando, but was waived soon after without making an appearance for the club.

Barrett signed with NASL side Jacksonville Armada on 2 April 2015.

In March 2016, Barrett moved to Swedish side Piteå IF. He left the club on 1 August 2016.

After his release from Pitea, Barrett signed with USL Championship side Swope Park Rangers on 15 August 2016.

On 11 January 2019, Barrett joined USL side Tulsa Roughnecks.
