= Fabricio Ortiz =

Argentine footballer

Personal information
- Date of birth: March 17, 1990 (age 36)
- Place of birth: Casilda, Argentina
- Height: 1.80 m (5 ft 11 in)
- Position: Defender

Team information
- Current team: Club Atlético Porteño
- Number: 4

Youth career
- 1995–2006: Alumni de Villa María
- 2007–2011: Vélez Sarsfield

Senior career*
| Years | Team | Apps | (Gls) |
| 2011 | Misano | 66 | (5) |
| 2012 | CA Aprendices Casildenses | 8 | (1) |
| 2013–2014 | Alumni de Villa María | 66 | (4) |
| 2015 | Jacksonville Armada | 23 | (0) |
| 2016 | Fort Lauderdale Strikers | 35 | (7) |
| 2017–2018 | Shabab Al-Aqaba | 18 | (2) |
| 2018 | Gokulam Kerala F.C. | 12 | (1) |
| 2019– | Club Atlético Porteño | 16 | (0) |
- * Club domestic league appearances and goals as of 13:31, 26 July 2018 (UTC)

Fabricio Ortiz (born March 17, 1990) is an Argentine footballer who currently plays for Ecuadorian Serie B side Club Atlético Porteño as a defender.

== Career ==
Ortiz played 23 matches for Jacksonville Armada in the North American Soccer League in the 2015 season. After a spell in Jordan, Ortiz joined I-League side Gokulam Kerala. He left the club at the end of 2018. On February 28, 2019, he signed with Club Atlético Porteño of Ecuadorian Serie B.
