= Coastal Cup =

Trophy and soccer competition

- Location: Florida
- Teams: Miami FC; Sporting JAX; Tampa Bay Rowdies; former teams: Jacksonville Armada FC; Fort Lauderdale Strikers
- First meeting: 2010
- Latest meeting: Miami FC (2026)
- Next meeting: 2027

Statistics
- Total meetings: 7 official 9 unrecognized (since 2017)
- Most wins: Tampa Bay Rowdies (11)

The Coastal Cup is a trophy and soccer competition among the USL Championship (USL) teams based in Florida. Established in 2010, the trophy was originally awarded to the best team in regular season play among Florida-based franchises. Head-to-head playoff games, U.S. Open Cup matches and friendlies have no bearing on the outcome of this competition. The Fort Lauderdale Strikers did not field a team in 2017 and were later dissolved. The Tampa Bay Rowdies also participated in this cup from 2010 though 2016, before leaving the NASL for the USL. With Miami FC joining the USL, the competition restarted in 2020.

== Pre-history ==
The idea of an all-Florida Cup in soccer goes back to the Tang sponsored, Florida Cup in the American Soccer League. It was contested in the 1988 ASL season between the second incarnation of the Fort Lauderdale Strikers, the Miami Sharks, the Orlando Lions, and the original Tampa Bay Rowdies. In a runaway, Fort Lauderdale won the title with a total of 24 points, outpacing Orlando and Tampa Bay by 12 points and Miami by 18. They clinched the title with a month left to play in the season. They were awarded the Tang trophy on August 3 at Lockhart Stadium during halftime of their match versus Miami. Although there were at least two Florida-based clubs in the ASL (and its successor, the American Professional Soccer League) through the 1993 season, the 1988 edition was the only time in that era of Florida professional club soccer that a trophy competition of this nature was contested.

== History ==
The Coastal Cup was first contested in 2010 as part of the fifth incarnation of the Florida Derby, between FC Tampa Bay and the original Miami FC Blues, while both were members of the D2 Pro League. Within two years time both teams would re-brand using the names of the historic NASL clubs from the two regions of Florida and were themselves part of the new NASL.

Tampa Bay won the first four Coastal Cups, with the Fort Lauderdale Strikers finally breaking through in 2014. The addition of the Jacksonville Armada to the NASL for the 2015 season made the Coastal Cup a triangular competition. The Strikers retained the trophy in 2015 with one match to spare by virtue of Jacksonville's 2–0 upset victory over the Rowdies on September 26. In the 2016 season the new Miami FC squad joined the NASL to make the competition a four-team affair. Shortly after Tampa Bay secured its fifth cup title, the franchise announced it would be leaving the NASL for the United Soccer League beginning in 2017. Although Jacksonville and Miami both participated in the 2017 NASL season, with Miami FC sweeping all five head-to-head matches, the Coastal Cup trophy was not presented to them. Miami FC joined Tampa Bay in the USL Championship in 2020 to revive this all-Florida in-league rivalry, but the trophy still has not resurfaced.

== Current season ==
2026
Team	Pts	Pld	W	L	D	GF	GA	GD
Miami FC	9	4	3	1	0	12	8	+4
Tampa Bay Rowdies	9	4	3	1	0	7	4	+3
Sporting JAX	0	4	0	0	4	4	11	-7

Tiebreaker sequence: 1. Goal Differential - 2. Total Goals - 3. Head-To-Head Record - 4. Away Goal Difference - 5. Away Goals Scored

== By season ==
2010
Team	Pts	Pld	W	L	D	GF	GA	GD
FC Tampa Bay	6	4	1	0	3	7	5	+2
Miami FC Blues (2006–10)	3	4	0	1	3	5	7	-2

2011
Team	Pts	Pld	W	L	D	GF	GA	GD
FC Tampa Bay	10	4	3	0	1	9	3	+6
Fort Lauderdale Strikers	1	4	0	3	1	3	9	-6

2012
Team	Pts	Pld	W	L	D	GF	GA	GD
Tampa Bay Rowdies	9	4	3	1	0	10	5	+5
Fort Lauderdale Strikers	3	4	1	3	0	5	10	-5

2013
Team	Pts	Pld	W	L	D	GF	GA	GD
Tampa Bay Rowdies	9	4	3	1	0	9	4	+5
Fort Lauderdale Strikers	3	4	1	3	0	4	9	-5

2014
Team	Pts	Pld	W	L	D	GF	GA	GD
Fort Lauderdale Strikers	6	3	2	1	0	5	5	0
Tampa Bay Rowdies	3	3	1	2	0	5	5	0

2015
Team	Pts	Pld	W	L	D	GF	GA	GD
Fort Lauderdale Strikers	15	6	5	1	0	10	4	+6
Tampa Bay Rowdies	9	6	3	3	0	9	10	-2
Jacksonville Armada	3	6	1	5	0	7	11	-4

2016
Team	Pts	Pld	W	L	D	GF	GA	GD
Tampa Bay Rowdies	14	9	3	1	5	15	11	+4
Jacksonville Armada	13	9	3	2	4	12	11	+1
Fort Lauderdale Strikers	10	9	2	3	4	9	11	-2
Miami FC	8	9	1	3	5	10	13	-3

2017
Team	Pts	Pld	W	L	D	GF	GA	GD
Miami FC	15	5	5	0	0	10	0	+10
Jacksonville Armada	0	5	0	5	0	0	10	-10

*Although these were NASL regular season games the Coastal Cup was not presented in 2017, or since in the USL Championship

2020
Team	Pts	Pld	W	L	D	GF	GA	GD
Tampa Bay Rowdies	10	4	3	0	1	8	1	+7
Miami FC	1	4	0	3	1	1	8	-7

2021
Team	Pts	Pld	W	L	D	GF	GA	GD
Tampa Bay Rowdies	6	4	2	2	0	7	5	+2
Miami FC	6	4	2	2	0	7	7	-2

2022
Team	Pts	Pld	W	L	D	GF	GA	GD
Tampa Bay Rowdies#	3	2	1	1	0	2	2	0
Miami FC	3	2	1	1	0	2	2	0

#Tampa Bay wins on away goals, 2-1.

2023
Team	Pts	Pld	W	L	D	GF	GA	GD
Tampa Bay Rowdies	6	2	2	0	0	4	0	+4
Miami FC	0	2	0	2	0	0	4	-4

2024
Team	Pts	Pld	W	L	D	GF	GA	GD
Tampa Bay Rowdies	6	2	2	0	0	7	2	+5
Miami FC	0	2	0	2	0	2	7	-5

2025
Team	Pts	Pld	W	L	D	GF	GA	GD
Tampa Bay Rowdies	6	2	2	0	0	4	2	+2
Miami FC	0	2	0	2	0	2	4	-2

== All-time ==
Team	Seasons*	Titles	Matches	Won	Lost	Draw
Tampa Bay Rowdies	13	11	54	32	12	10
Miami FC	9	2	34	12	18	6
Fort Lauderdale Strikers	7	2	34	11	15	7
Jacksonville Armada	3	0	20	4	12	4
Sporting Club Jacksonville	1	0	4	0	4	0

*totals through 2026 season
