= Lucas Trejo =

Argentine footballer (born 1987)

Personal information
- Full name: Lucas Federico Trejo
- Date of birth: 29 December 1987 (age 38)
- Place of birth: Córdoba, Argentina
- Height: 1.83 m (6 ft 0 in)
- Position: Defender

Team information
- Current team: Atlético Morelia
- Number: 3

Youth career
- 2007: L'Escala

Senior career*
Years	Team	Apps	(Gls)
2007–2011	Atromitos		
2008–2009	→ Ethnikos Asteras (loan)		
2009–2010	→ Egaleo (loan)		
2012–2013	Racing de Córdoba	17	(0)
2014–2015	Instituto	1	(0)
2015	Jacksonville Armada	25	(0)
2016–2019	Monagas Sport Club	69	(7)
2018	→ Atlético Huila (loan)	6	(0)
2019–2020	Deportivo Táchira	38	(2)
2020	Zacatepec	5	(0)
2021–2022	Deportivo Táchira	26	(2)
2022–2023	Deportivo Municipal	31	(3)
2023–2024	Zamora	18	(1)
2024–2025	Nueva Esparta	21	(1)
2025–2026	Portuguesa	23	(1)
2026–	Marítimo	0	(0)
- * Club domestic league appearances and goals as of 8 March 2026

Lucas Federico Trejo (born 29 December 1987) is an Argentine football player who plays as a defender for Venezuelan Segunda División club Marítimo.

== Career ==
Trejo began his professional football career in the lower levels of Spanish football with FC L´Eskala. He signed for Greek side Atromitos in 2007, appearing for the club in the Super League Greece before going on loan to Ethnikos Asteras He also played for Egaleo in the Greek Beta Ethniki. He played for Sportivo Belgrano in the Torneo Argentino A from 2012 to 2014.

He was released by Jacksonville Armada in December 2015.

In July 2016, he is playing as a defender for Venezuelan football club Monagas Sport Club.

Along with Bochy Hoyos and Lucas Scaglia, he was one of three Argentinians signed by Monagas Sport Club on 29 January 2015.

In February 2026, he joined the Club Sport Marítimo de La Guaira, a club in Liga FUTVE 2.

== Personal life ==
Trejo was married to Yanina Maranella, and together they had two children, Aarón and Ainhoa. On 24 June 2026, Trejo's wife and children were killed when two earthquakes struck Yaracuy, causing their building to collapse in La Guaira, Venezuela.
