= Joseph Toby =

Sierra Leone-American soccer player (born 1989)

Joseph Samuel Toby
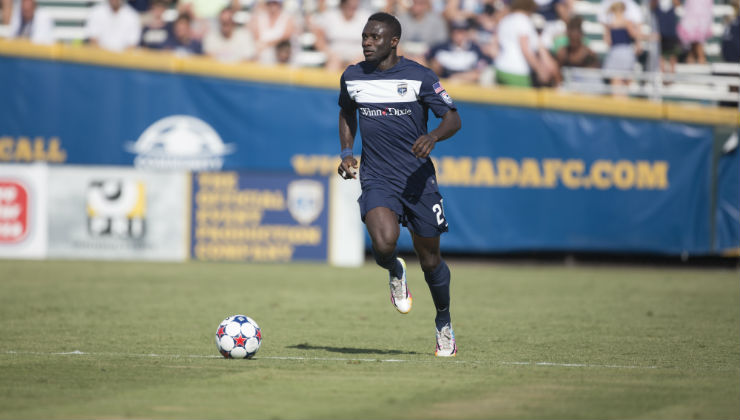

Personal information
- Date of birth: 6 February 1989 (age 37)
- Place of birth: Freetown, Sierra Leone
- Height: 1.78 m (5 ft 10 in)
- Position: Defender

Youth career
- 2008–2012: Flagler Saints

Senior career*
Years	Team	Apps	(Gls)
2009	Central Florida Kraze	15	(0)
2011	FC JAX Destroyers	7	(1)
2012	Orlando City U-23	16	(0)
2013	IMG Academy Bradenton	11	(0)
2014	Orlando City	0	(0)
2014	Arizona United	18	(0)
2015	Jacksonville Armada FC	19	(1)
- * Club domestic league appearances and goals as of April 4, 2014

Joseph Toby (born February 6, 1989) is a Sierra Leone-American soccer player who plays as a defender. He came from Sierra Leone to Florida at the age of 15 in 2004.

== Career ==
=== College ===
Toby a four-year starter at Flagler College, where he received numerous awards and accolades. Toby was a three-time National Soccer Coaches Association of America (NSCAA) All-Southeast Region selection, a Daktronics First-Team All-American in 2011, a two-time Daktronics All-Region pick and was a three-time All-Peach Belt Conference First-Team selection. During that time, Toby appeared in 80 matches, scored 25 goals, and notched 22 assists.

=== Professional ===
Toby signed with Jacksonville Armada FC of the North American Soccer League on February 2, 2015. He was released by Jacksonville in November 2015.
