= Charles Eloundou =

Cameroonian footballer

Personal information
- Full name: Charles Betrand Etoundi Eloundou
- Date of birth: 4 December 1994 (age 31)
- Place of birth: Yaoundé, Cameroon
- Height: 1.70 m (5 ft 7 in)
- Position: Left winger

Team information
- Current team: Spartakos Kitiou
- Number: 99

Senior career*
Years	Team	Apps	(Gls)
2010–2013	AS Fortuna de Mfou		
2011–2012	→ Unisport Bafang (loan)	20	(9)
2012	→ Coton Sport (loan)		
2013	→ Colorado Rapids (loan)	0	(0)
2014–2015	Colorado Rapids	22	(0)
2015	→ Charlotte Independence (loan)	3	(0)
2015	→ Colorado Springs Switchbacks (loan)	4	(2)
2016–2017	Jacksonville Armada	49	(7)
2018–2020	Nea Salamina	69	(13)
2020–2022	Anorthosis	24	(2)
2021–2022	→ Ethnikos Achna (loan)	16	(1)
2023	Jacksonville Armada	0	(0)
2024–2025	Achyronas-Onisilos	27	(9)
2025–	Spartakos Kitiou	25	(9)

International career^{‡}
2009–2011	Cameroon U17		
2012–2013	Cameroon U20	7	(8)
2013	Cameroon	1	(0)
- * Club domestic league appearances and goals as of 3 May 2026 ‡ National team caps and goals as of 9 February 2013

Charles Eloundou (born 4 December 1994) is a Cameroonian professional footballer who plays as a left winger for Cypriot club Spartakos Kitiou.

== Club career ==
Eloundou began his career with Cameroonian side AS Fortuna de Mfou. He has played on loan with fellow Cameroonian sides Coton Sport FC and Unisport Bafang. While with Unisport he scored 9 goals in 20 matches. His play in Cameroon brought him to the attention of Major League Soccer sides.

On 25 January 2013, Eloundou signed with the Colorado Rapids of Major League Soccer on a one-year loan with an option for a permanent transfer at the end of the 2013 season. He was signed via the MLS weighted lottery process, where Real Salt Lake and D.C. United also had the chance to acquire him.

Eloundou signed with the North American Soccer League's Jacksonville Armada FC on 10 March 2016. Eloundou joined the Armada at the beginning of February and at the time of his signing, led Jacksonville in preseason scoring with three goals.

On 1 July 2020, Eloundou signed with Anorthosis Famagusta of the Cypriot First Division. In his first season, he scored the winning goal in the 110th minute of the Cypriot Cup Final in a 2-1 victory over Olympiakos Nicosia after coming on as a substitute in the 105th minute to give Anorthosis their 11th Cypriot Cup title and their first trophy in 13 years.

== International career ==
Eloundou has been a prominent member of the Cameroon's Under-17 and Under-20 national teams. He played four matches for the Cameroon B side in the 2012 Nehru Cup. He was called up by the full national team for a friendly match against Tanzania on 6 February 2013 in Dar es Salaam, Tanzania. He made his senior national team debut in that game, coming on as a substitute in the 60th minute. The game ended in a 1–0 loss.
