= Jordan Gafa =

American soccer player

Personal information
- Full name: Jordan C. Gafa
- Date of birth: June 19, 1990 (age 36)
- Place of birth: San Diego, California, United States
- Height: 1.79 m (5 ft 10 in)
- Position: Defender

Youth career
- Nomads, Arsenal FC (California)

College career
Years	Team	Apps	(Gls)
2008–2012	North Carolina Tar Heels		

Senior career*
Years	Team	Apps	(Gls)
2011	Orange County Blue Star	5	(1)
2012	Carolina Dynamo	6	(0)
2013–2014	Tampa Bay Rowdies	19	(0)
2015	Jacksonville Armada FC	5	(0)
- * Club domestic league appearances and goals as of February 4, 2016

Jordan C. Gafa (born June 19, 1990) is an American soccer player who most recently played for Jacksonville Armada FC.

== Career ==
=== College and amateur ===
Gafa spent his entire collegiate career at the University of North Carolina, Chapel Hill. After redshirting his freshman year in 2008, Gafa made seven appearances for the Tar Heels in 2009 and tallied his first collegiate goal on October 28 in a 7–0 victory over Stetson University. In 2010, Gafa made 19 appearances with three starts in the midfield and finished the year with a goal and an assist. In 2011, Gafa moved to right back and appeared in all 26 matches, starting in 24. He tallied two goals and two assists that year including a game-winning goal against rivals NC State in the ACC Quarterfinal. He was part of a defense that allowed only 18 goals all season and 2011 and ranked 11th in the nation with a 0.66 Goals Against Average. The Tar Heels went on to win the National Championship, their second in school history, defeating UNC Charlotte 1–0. In his final season with North Carolina, Gafa started in all 22 matches and finished the year with two goals and four assists. From 2008 to 2012, Gafa went on to four straight College Cups and just fell short of a fifth appearance after being eliminated in the Elite 8 versus Indiana in 2012.

During his collegiate career, Gafa also played in the USL Premier Development League for Orange County Blue Star and Carolina Dynamo.

=== Professional ===
After going undrafted in the 2013 MLS SuperDraft, Gafa joined MLS side Columbus Crew on a preseason trial.

On March 27, 2013, Gafa signed his first professional contract, joining NASL club Tampa Bay Rowdies on a two-year deal. He made his professional debut a month later on April 27, coming on as an early sub for Jay Needham who left the match in the 12th minute with an injury. The Rowdies went on to win the match 2–1.

On March 19, 2015, Gafa signed with Jacksonville Armada FC. He was released on February 4, 2016.

== Honors ==
=== University of North Carolina ===
- Atlantic Coast Conference Regular Season Champions (1): 2011
- Atlantic Coast Conference Tournament Champions (1): 2011
- NCAA College Cup Champions (1): 2011

=== Carolina Dynamo ===
- USL PDL Atlantic Division Champions (1): 2012
- USL PDL Eastern Conference Champions (1): 2012
