= Bochy Hoyos =

Argentine footballer

Personal information
- Full name: Ángel Guillermo Hoyos Bubbico
- Date of birth: December 20, 1983 (age 42)
- Place of birth: Córdoba, Argentina
- Height: 1.76 m (5 ft 9 in)
- Position: Attacking midfielder

Senior career*
Years	Team	Apps	(Gls)
2002–2003	Celta de Vigo B		
2003	Talleres de Córdoba		
2004–2005	Barcelona B		
2005–2007	Palamós		
2007–2009	Atromitos	3	(0)
2009–2010	Panserraikos	4	(0)
2011	Unión Comercio	18	(3)
2012	Once Caldas		
2012–2013	José Gálvez FBC	24	(2)
2013–2014	Carabobo FC		
2015	Jacksonville Armada FC	18	(2)
- * Club domestic league appearances and goals as of 13:31, 14 October 2015 (UTC)

Ángel Guillermo "Bochy" Hoyos Bubbico (born 20 December 1983 in Córdoba) is an Argentine footballer who most recently played for Jacksonville Armada FC in the North American Soccer League. Hoyos was released by Jacksonville in November 2015.
