= Nicolás Perea =

Colombian-American footballer and beach soccer player

Personal information
- Full name: Nicolás Perea
- Date of birth: August 6, 1992 (age 34)
- Place of birth: Bucaramanga, Colombia
- Height: 1.83 m (6 ft 0 in)
- Position: Midfielder

College career
Years	Team	Apps	(Gls)
2011–2014	Syracuse Orange	76	(10)

Senior career*
Years	Team	Apps	(Gls)
2013	Ocean City Nor'easters	12	(2)
2014	K-W United FC	9	(0)
2015–2016	Jacksonville Armada	24	(0)
2017–2018	Rio Grande Valley FC	33	(3)
2019	Des Moines Menace	12	(2)
2019	Indy Eleven	5	(0)

International career^{‡}
2019–	United States (beach)	34	(13)
Medal record
Men's beach soccer
Representing United States
CONCACAF Beach Soccer Championship
Gold medal – first place	2023 Bahamas	Team
ANOC World Beach Games Qualifiers
Gold medal – first place	2022 El Salvador	Team
- * Club domestic league appearances and goals as of August 27, 2019 ‡ National team caps and goals as of May 19, 2025

Nicolás Perea (born August 6, 1992) is a Colombian-born American footballer and beach soccer player. He last played as a midfielder for Indy Eleven in the USL Championship in 2019 and represents the United States in international beach soccer, contributing to their 2023 CONCACAF Beach Soccer Championship title.

== Early life ==
Perea was born in Bucaramanga, Colombia, on August 6, 1992, and moved to the United States at age seven, settling in Hallandale Beach, Florida. He played youth soccer with Weston FC and is bilingual in English and Spanish. Perea graduated from Syracuse University in 2014 with a psychology degree.

== Career ==
=== College ===
Perea played college soccer for the Syracuse Orange from 2011 to 2014, appearing in 76 matches and scoring 10 goals. He helped Syracuse reach the NCAA College Cup (Final Four) in 2012, their first appearance, and the Sweet 16 in 2012 and 2014. During college, Perea played in the USL PDL with Ocean City Nor'easters in 2013 (12 matches, 2 goals) and K-W United FC in 2014 (9 matches).

=== Professional ===
Perea signed his first professional contract with the NASL’s Jacksonville Armada on February 10, 2015, playing 24 matches across 2015–2016. He joined USL Championship side Rio Grande Valley FC in September 2017, making 33 appearances and scoring 3 goals over 2017–2018.

In 2019, Perea played for USL League Two’s Des Moines Menace, recording 12 appearances and 2 goals. He signed with USL Championship’s Indy Eleven on August 27, 2019, appearing in 5 matches before the season's end. Perea has not played professionally in the USL Championship since 2019, focusing instead on beach soccer.

=== Beach soccer ===
Perea transitioned to beach soccer in 2019 after a local exhibition match in Florida led to an invitation to a U.S. national team camp in Fort Lauderdale, scouted by coach Francis Farberoff. He debuted at the 2021 CONCACAF Beach Soccer Championship, scoring 3 goals and helping the U.S. qualify for the 2021 FIFA Beach Soccer World Cup. At the World Cup, he scored 4 goals.

In 2022, Perea won the ANOC World Beach Games Qualifiers in El Salvador and was named U.S. Soccer Beach Male Player of the Year. He earned a silver medal at the Mundialito Gran Canaria. In 2023, he scored 4 goals at the CONCACAF Beach Soccer Championship in the Bahamas, contributing to the U.S.’s first CONCACAF title since 2013 with a 5–0 win over Mexico. Perea has over 30 international appearances and 13 goals, with 50 career goals in six CONCACAF Championships, the most by a U.S. player.

== Personal life ==
Perea resides in Florida and assists his girlfriend, Taylor Dante,. He has experience in social media management, videography, and photography, and has worked with brands like Smorgasburg Miami.
