= Pascal Millien =

Haitian footballer (born 1986)

Personal information
- Date of birth: 3 May 1986 (age 40)
- Place of birth: Léogâne, Haiti
- Height: 1.74 m (5 ft 9 in)

College career
Years	Team	Apps	(Gls)
2006	Lindsey Wilson Blue Raiders	22	(6)
2007–2009	Tampa Spartans	57	(25)

Senior career*
Years	Team	Apps	(Gls)
2006	Ajax Orlando Prospects	11	(0)
2007	Bradenton Academics	13	(7)
2008	Atlanta Silverbacks U23's	14	(4)
2009	Chicago Fire Premier	10	(2)
2010–2011	FC Tampa Bay	52	(5)
2012–2013	Sligo Rovers	30	(2)
2014	Sheikh Russel KC	7	(3)
2014	Samut Songkhram	10	(5)
2014	Fidelis Andria	0	(0)
2015–2016	Jacksonville Armada	37	(7)
2016–2017	Fort Lauderdale Strikers	7	(0)
2017	Finn Harps	6	(0)
2018	Rayong	11	(2)
2019	Tropics SC		

International career
2006–2016	Haiti	33	(1)
- * Club domestic league appearances and goals as of 4 October 2020

Pascal Millien (born 3 May 1986) is a Haitian former professional footballer who played as a midfielder.

== Career ==
=== Youth and college ===
Millien was born in Léogâne, Haiti, but moved to Lakeland, Florida as a teenager. He played his youth club soccer for HC United. He attended Auburndale High School, playing football and soccer where he totaled 114 goals in three seasons with 40 assists and was named 2005 Florida Gatorade Soccer Player of the Year.

After playing one year of college soccer at Lindsey Wilson College in Kentucky, he transferred to the University of Tampa prior to his second year. At Tampa, Millien totaled 25 goals and 30 assists in three seasons, helping to lead the team to the NCAA Division II Final Four in 2008. He was named to the Daktronics All-South Region first-team, the NSCAA All-South Region first-team, the Daktronics All-American first-team, NSCAA All-American third-team, the SSC All-Tournament Team, NCAA South Regional All-Tournament team, and the NCAA National All-Tournament Team as a junior, and to the NSCAA All-America Team, the All-SSC first-team, the Daktronics All-American second-team, the Daktronics All-South Region first-team, the NSCAA All-South Region first-team, and the SSC All-Tournament team as a senior.

During his college years Millien also played extensively in the USL Premier Development League, appearing for the Ajax Orlando Prospects, Bradenton Academics, Atlanta Silverbacks U23's and Chicago Fire Premier.

=== Professional ===
Millien turned professional in 2010 when he signed a contract with the FC Tampa Bay. He made his professional debut on 16 April 2010, in Tampa's first-ever game, a 1–0 victory over Crystal Palace Baltimore. Millien scored his first professional goal on 22 May 2010 in Tampa's 3–0 victory over A.C. St. Louis.

Millien played the 2011 season for FC Tampa Bay. His contract expired at the end of the season, making him a free agent.

Millien joined Sligo Rovers on trial in early February 2012. After impressing with a goal in his second pre-season game, Sligo Rovers signed him to a contract for the 2012 season. Millien was unable to play with Sligo in the early part of the season due to issues with a work permit, but he made his debut on 20 April, coming on as a second-half substitute in a league match against Cork City. Millien helped Rovers win the league title, appearing 17 times and netting 2 goals. In December 2012, Millien agreed a new contract with the club extending his stay for another season.

Pascal joined the Bangladeshi side Sheikh Russel KC in February, 2014. His team struggled throughout the domestic season. He appeared in the second phase of the league and scored 3 goals from 7 matches. Sheikh Russel KC was eventually eliminated from the quarter-final of the Independence Cup where they fell to Feni Soccer Club in the tiebreakers. Pascal scored 2 goals in 3 matches there. Bangladeshi football fans will, however, remember him for his fantastic performances in the 2014 AFC President's Cup- a third tier Asian club football competition held in Sri Lanka that year. Pascal paired with local star Mithun upfront, producing a lethal striking partnership. Mithun scored 4 goals from 3 matches while Pascal scored 2 and assisted 5 in the same number of matches. Their chemistry saw The Bengal Blues progressing into the finals of the tournament and creating a bright chance to qualify for the second tier AFC Cup.

In September 2014 Millien joined the Italian Serie D side Fidelis Andria. He never played an official game with the team because of international transfer complications and on December he had to quit Italy for Visa expiration.

On 29 January 2015, Millien returned to the NASL by signing with Jacksonville Armada FC ahead of their inaugural season.

On 11 March 2017, Millien signed for Finn Harps in the League of Ireland Premier Division.

Millien returned to Auburndale in 2019 by signing with Tropics SC of the United Premier Soccer League. Tropics SC is a professional outdoor team in the Florida Tropics SC organization.

=== International ===
Millien made his debut for the full Haitian national team in 2006, aged 20.

== Honours ==
Sligo Rovers

- League of Ireland: 2012
- FAI Cup: 2013

Tampa Bay Rowdies

- NASL Best XI: 2011
