= Jacksonville Armada FC =

- Full name: Jacksonville Armada Football Club
- Nickname: Boys in Blue
- Founded: May 2013; 13 years ago
- Stadium: New Eastside Stadium
- Capacity: 2,545
- Owner: Chris Campione
- CEO: Nathan Walter
- League: MLS Next Pro (2027)
- Website: www.jacksonvillearmada.com
Home colours	Away colours	Third colours

Jacksonville Armada FC is an American professional soccer team based in Jacksonville, Florida. They were founded in 2013 as an expansion franchise in the North American Soccer League (NASL), the second tier of American soccer, and played until the league folded in 2018. Armada FC then moved to the National Premier Soccer League (NPSL), the fourth tier of the American soccer pyramid, during the 2018 season before going on hiatus. They are set to resume play in MLS Next Pro in 2027.

== History ==
=== Launch in North American Soccer League ===
In May 2013, Jacksonville businessman Mark Frisch and former Major League Soccer player Darío Sala formed Sunshine Soccer Group with the intention of bringing professional soccer to Jacksonville. The effort was bolstered by several successful soccer matches held at TIAA Bank Field, including two national team games that set records for international friendlies. The North American Soccer League invited the group to present a bid for a 2015 expansion team at their July 25, 2013, board meeting. The bid was accepted, and the NASL announced that Jacksonville and Oklahoma City FC would receive franchises for the 2015 season.

The organization has announced that Sala would serve as general manager, and former NFL Europe and Jacksonville Jaguars executive Steve Livingstone will serve as president. On February 18, 2014, the team announced its name would be Jacksonville Armada FC, and that its colors would be navy blue, royal blue, gold, and white. On June 11, 2014, the team announced it had hired former Argentine player José Luis Villarreal as its first head coach.

The team began playing in the 2015 NASL Spring season. After a few pre-season games in February and March, the club played its first league game, at home, on April 4, 2015, defeating FC Edmonton, 3–1. On September 21, 2015, the club announced the dismissal of head coach Guillermo Hoyos, general manager Dario Sala and assistant coaches Edison Ibarra, Sebastian Fabres and Rafael Perez Nino. The Armada stood 11th and last in the North American Soccer League. The decision came just three months after the team had extended Hoyos' contract through the end of 2019. "Following an in-depth analysis of the team and operations, I am confident that a new direction is needed to turn around our team", Armada owner Mark Frisch said. Director of player development Eric Dade took over through the end of the 2015 NASL season.

On November 24, 2015, the Armada announced U.S. Soccer player Tony Meola as the team's new head coach. After nine months on the job, Meola was fired on August 7, 2016, with Mark Lowry taking over as interim head coach for the remainder of the 2016 Fall Season.

After the 2016 season ended, the NASL lost two teams to the then Div. III United Soccer League. At the time the USL had submitted to be promoted to Div. II with the NASL. Several NASL teams were then rumored to be shutting down or switching leagues as well as the possibility of the league losing its Div. II status. In December 2016, there were several reports stating the Armada were about to fold and had released all their players due to mounting financial losses. The reports turned out to be false but the team did release five of their highest price players. In January 2017, the NASL was approved to keep its Div. II status but Armada owner Frisch confirmed that he was looking to sell the team and that the league would likely be taking over the club.

In July 2017, local entrepreneur Robert Palmer of RP Funding purchased the Armada.

=== Fall to amateur and hiatus ===
After recording its best season to date in professional soccer during the 2017 season, finishing fifth overall in the NASL while just falling short of a playoff berth, the league lost its Division II sanctioning for the upcoming 2018 season. While the league entered into legal proceeding against the United States Soccer Federation, Armada announced it would field a team in the National Premier Soccer League, an amateur league commonly referred to as part of fourth tier of American soccer, while still retaining membership in the NASL. This team retains the Armada name and replaced the organization's Under-23 team in the NPSL, while merging both sides' rosters.

The Armada clinched its first ever playoff appearance by finishing second overall in the Sunshine Conference, and won its first playoff game against Miami United FC, 4–1, on July 11, 2018. The team later fell to fellow NASL side Miami FC 2 in the conference final, 3–1.

On October 31, 2018, club president Nathan Walter announced that Jacksonville Armada would play in the NPSL in 2019. However, on December 10, Walter announced that the team's U-23 side would compete in the 2019 NPSL season as the organization's focus shifted to player development. In the meantime the first team would continue to explore options for a return to competition in 2020.

In November 2019, the organization announced that it proposed an agreement to take over land in downtown Jacksonville for a new stadium. The first team will remain off the field for 2020 while the U-23 side announced a move to the brand new "Gulf Coast Conference" in the NPSL.

=== Move to MLS Next Pro ===
On November 2, 2023, the club announced that they would move to MLS Next Pro, the reserve and development league for Major League Soccer, and begin playing again in the 2026 season. A new stadium is set to be constructed in time for the 2026 season with 2,500 to 3,000 seats in its initial configuration. Jacksonville will remain an independent team in the league, which is composed mostly of reserve teams for MLS clubs.

In a public statement released on October 30, 2025, owner Robert Palmer announced that after years of guiding the Armada, changes in his personal and professional life – including a growing family and expanding real-estate business – had reduced his ability to provide the day-to-day, locally rooted leadership he believed the club required. He confirmed that an agreement had been reached to sell the club to a Jacksonville-based business owner and that his companies would remain involved as sponsors during the team's transition. Palmer expressed deep gratitude to the club's supporters, especially the “Section 904” fan group, and reaffirmed his belief in the Armada's potential as the club prepares for its next phase of development.

The same day as the Palmer announcement, Jacksonville attorney and sports-team investor Chris Campione announced that he would become the majority principal owner and managing director of Jacksonville Armada FC after current owner Robert Palmer confirmed the sale of the club. As part of the transition, Campione affirmed that the club would pursue the construction of a privately funded downtown stadium with a minimum of 8,000 seats, with groundbreaking planned for December. Long-time club executive Nathan Walter, who had served as the Armada's president and general manager since 2017, was set to take on the role of Club Director and chief executive officer under the new ownership.

=== League and cup history ===
Season	League	Div.	Pos.	Pl.	W	D	L	GS	GA	P	Overall	Playoffs	U.S. Open Cup	Top goalscorer		Avg. attendance
Season	League	Div.	Pos.	Pl.	W	D	L	GS	GA	P	Overall	Playoffs	U.S. Open Cup	Name	League	Avg. attendance
2015	NASL	Spring	6th	10	3	3	4	15	18	12	11th	did not qualify	Third round	(Guinea) Alhassane Keita	7	7,927 (3rd)
2015	NASL	Fall	11th	20	5	4	11	18	31	19	11th	did not qualify	Third round	(Guinea) Alhassane Keita	7	7,927 (3rd)
2016	NASL	Spring	10th	10	1	4	5	5	11	7	11th	did not qualify	Fourth round	(Cameroon) Charles Eloundou (Guinea) Alhassane Keita	6	3,499 (9th)
2016	NASL	Fall	11th	22	5	8	9	25	35	23	11th	did not qualify	Fourth round	(Cameroon) Charles Eloundou (Guinea) Alhassane Keita	6	3,499 (9th)
2017	NASL	Spring	4th	16	6	6	4	17	16	24	5th	did not qualify	Fourth round	(Scotland) Jack Blake	9	3,035 (7th)
2017	NASL	Fall	5th	16	4	7	5	21	22	19	5th	did not qualify	Fourth round	(Scotland) Jack Blake	9	3,035 (7th)
2018	NPSL	Sunshine Conference	2nd	12	7	3	2	24	10	24	28th	Conference finals	Third round	(Republic of Ireland) Ciarán Kilduff	6	N/A
On Hiatus from 2019 to 2026
2027	MLSNP	TBA														

== Stadium ==
On July 11, 2014, the Armada announced they would play their home games at the Baseball Grounds of Jacksonville (later re-dubbed Community First Park) in Downtown Jacksonville for at least three seasons. They hope to later construct their own expandable soccer-specific stadium. In 2017, due to the high costs associated with playing at the Baseball Grounds, the Armada signed a lease to play at Hodges Stadium, a soccer and track and field stadium at the University of North Florida.

The team has also played games in EverBank Field, including their first exhibition game vs the Philadelphia Union, which set a modern-era NASL record for preseason attendance (13,934). It was also the site for their first regular season game, which was a 3–1 victory over FC Edmonton, and set the modern era NASL record for regular season attendance (16,164). The Armada also use Southern Oak Stadium as a venue for US Open Cup matches.

On January 30, 2025, the city of Jacksonville issued a construction permit for an $18.2 million soccer stadium for the Armada in Downtown Jacksonville's Sports and Entertainment District. Built to house the MLS Next Pro team and the headquarters of LPT Realty, the initial phase featured a 14,000 sq. ft. facility with 2,545 seats, with future plans to expand capacity to 9,472 seats. However, in September 2026, the city informed the Armada that the soccer club would have to pay full market price, valued at approximately $132,018 by the Duval County Property Appraiser, for the 6.56 acres of land originally acquired for $1 in 2023. The penalty was triggered after the club failed to meet a September 1, 2026, deadline for the substantial completion of the stadium. Despite the permits being issued in early 2025 and an initial planned groundbreaking, no construction had begun by September 2026. Additionally, a pending sale of the team from Robert Palmer to local attorney Chris Campione, first announced in October 2025, remained uncompleted.

== Club culture ==
The Coastal Cup was established in 2010 and was originally contested between the Fort Lauderdale Strikers and Tampa Bay Rowdies, but with Jacksonville's entry into the league, the competition became triangular. The league added Miami FC in the 2016 season. This made the Coastal Cup a four team affair. After the 2016 season Tampa Bay left the NASL and joined the United Soccer League, while Fort Lauderdale ceased operations because of financial and legal issues.

The team is cheered on by Section 904, the first supporters' group. Section 904 is known for their singing, drumming, and blue-and-yellow smoke; can be seen behind the goal at every home match. Area code 904 is the telephone area code for all of metropolitan Jacksonville.

== Players and staff ==
=== Developmental team ===
In 2016, the Armada announced that they had formed an under 23 team to play in the National Premier Soccer League (NPSL) as part of their development system. The team, Jacksonville United U-23, replaced Jacksonville United FC in the NPSL. The Armada retained Jacksonville United coach Pat Cannon.

== Individual records ==
=== Top goalscorers ===
As of Match played July 14, 2018

	Name	Years	League	Playoffs	U.S. Open Cup	Total
1	(Guinea) Alhassane Keita	2015–2016, 2018	16 (46)	0 (0)	1 (5)	17 (51)
2	(Republic of Ireland) Ciarán Kilduff	2017–2018	10 (24)	3 (2)	1 (4)	14 (29)
3	(United States) J. C. Banks	2017–2018	10 (44)	2 (2)	1 (6)	13 (52)
4	(United States) Zach Steinberger	2016, 2017	12 (52)	0 (0)	0 (1)	12 (53)
5	(Scotland) Jack Blake	2017	9 (27)	0 (0)	1 (2)	10 (29)
6	(Haiti) Pascal Millien	2015–2016	7 (37)	0 (0)	0 (2)	7 (39)
6	(United States) Jemal Johnson	2015–2017	7 (73)	0 (0)	0 (3)	7 (76)
6	(Cameroon) Charles Eloundou	2016–2017	7 (49)	0 (0)	0 (4)	7 (53)
9	(United States) Derek Gebhard	2015–2018	6 (59)	0 (2)	0 (7)	6 (68)
10	(United States) Joshua Castellanos	2018	3 (12)	0 (2)	1 (4)	4 (16)

=== Most appearances ===
As of Match played July 14, 2018

	Name	Years	League	Playoffs	U.S. Open Cup	Total
1	(Haiti) Mechack Jérôme	2015–2018	74 (3)	1 (0)	7 (0)	82 (3)
2	(England) Jemal Johnson	2015–2017	73 (7)	0 (0)	3 (0)	76 (7)
3	(United States) Derek Gebhard	2015–2018	59 (6)	2 (0)	7 (0)	68 (6)
4	(Trinidad and Tobago) Kevan George	2016–2017	55 (0)	0 (0)	2 (0)	57 (0)
5	(Cameroon) Charles Eloundou	2016–2017	49 (7)	0 (0)	4 (0)	53 (7)
5	(United States) Zach Steinberger	2016, 2017	52 (12)	0 (0)	1 (0)	53 (12)
7	(United States) J. C. Banks	2017–2018	44 (10)	2 (2)	6 (1)	52 (13)
8	(Guinea) Alhassane Keita	2015–2016, 2018	46 (16)	0 (0)	5 (1)	51 (17)
9	(Mexico) Miguel Gallardo	2015–2016	43 (0)	0 (0)	3 (0)	46 (0)
9	(United States) Matt Bahner	2015–2016	45 (3)	0 (0)	1 (0)	46 (1)

=== Managerial records ===
As of Match played July 14, 2018

Name	Nat.	From	To	P	W	D	L	GS	GA	%W	Honours	Notes
José Luis Villarreal	Argentina	June 11, 2014	June 13, 2015	11	3	3	5	15	21	27.27		
Guillermo Ángel Hoyos	Argentina	June 14, 2015	September 21, 2015	13	3	2	8	10	20	23.08		
Eric Dade	United States	September 21, 2015	November 24, 2015	7	2	2	3	8	11	28.57		
Tony Meola	United States	November 24, 2015	August 7, 2016	20	3	6	11	14	29	15.00		
Mark Lowry	England	August 7, 2016	July 24, 2018	64	25	21	18	94	17	39.06	First playoff appearance and win in club history	2018 season played in NPSL

== See also ==
- Sports in Jacksonville
