= 2016 Tampa Bay Rowdies season =

Tampa Bay Rowdies
2016 season
- Owner: Bill Edwards (Majority); Andrew Nestor (Minority); David Laxer (Minority)
- Head coach: Stuart Campbell
- Stadium: Al Lang Stadium
- NASL: Spring: 5th Fall: 10th Combined: 9th
- NASL Playoffs: did not qualify
- U.S. Open Cup: Fourth Round
- Coastal Cup: Winners
- Top goalscorer: League: Georgi Hristov (10); All: Georgi Hristov (11)
- Highest home attendance: 7,690 (July 2 vs. Jacksonville)
- Lowest home attendance: League: 4,429 (Apr. 16 vs. Edmonton); All: 3,455 (Jun. 1 vs. Cincinnati)
- Average home league attendance: League: 6,066; All: 5,739
Home colors	Away colors	Third colors

The 2016 Tampa Bay Rowdies season was the club's sixth NASL season, and seventh season overall since their formation in 2008. It was also their final season in the NASL, as the team switched leagues to the USL after the season ended.

== Roster ==
As of 5 August 2016

No.	Name	Nationality	Position	Date of birth (age)	Signed from	Signed in	Contract ends	Apps.	Goals
Goalkeepers
18	Matt Pickens	(United States)	GK	5 April 1982 (age 44)	New England Revolution	2014		53	0
24	Chris Glodack	(United States)	GK	19 June 1993 (age 33)	Clemson Tigers	2015		0	0
Defenders
2	Darnell King	(United States)	DF	23 September 1990 (age 36)	Fort Lauderdale Strikers	2015		33	0
3	Neill Collins	(Scotland)	DF	2 September 1983 (age 43)	(England) Sheffield United	2016		5	1
4	Ben Sweat	(United States)	DF	4 September 1991 (age 35)	Columbus Crew	2015		30	0
5	Stefan Antonijevic	(Serbia)	DF	9 June 1981 (age 45)	Fort Lauderdale Strikers	2015		22	1
7	Frank Sanfilippo	(United States)	DF	8 September 1981 (age 45)	Fort Lauderdale Strikers	2016		0	0
15	Zac Portillos	(United States)	DF	19 January 1992 (age 34)	Akron Zips	2015		4	0
17	Tamika Mkandawire (captain)	(England)	DF	28 May 1983 (age 43)	(England) Shrewsbury Town	2014		51	5
Midfielders
9	Freddy Adu	(United States)	MF	2 June 1989 (age 37)	(Finland) KuPS	2015		8	0
11	Kalif Alhassan	(Ghana)	MF	15 October 1990 (age 36)	Minnesota United	2016		5	0
13	Justin Chavez	(United States)	MF	23 March 1990 (age 36)	Fort Lauderdale Strikers	2015		18	0
16	Juan Guerra	(Venezuela)	MF	16 February 1987 (age 39)	(Venezuela) Deportivo Lara	2015		27	2
21	Walter Ramírez	(Honduras)	MF	7 November 1983 (age 43)	Fort Lauderdale Strikers	2016		2	0
22	Keith Savage	(United States)	MF	9 August 1985 (age 41)	Portland Timbers	2011		101	13
23	Michael Nanchoff	(United States)	MF	24 September 1988 (age 38)	Portland Timbers	2016		5	0
26	Joe Cole	(England)	MF	8 November 1981 (age 45)	Coventry City	2016		0	0
30	Eric Avila	(United States)	MF	24 November 1987 (age 38)	(Mexico) Santos Laguna	2016		5	0
44	Chasen Voltzow	(United States)	MF	5 June 1990 (age 36)	St Pete Aztecs	2016		0	0
32	Martin Vingaard	(Denmark)	MF	20 March 1985 (age 41)	(Denmark) FC Nordsjælland	2016		0	0
33	Junior Burgos	(El Salvador)	MF	14 August 1988 (age 38)	Loan from Atlanta United	2016		3	0
94	PC	(Brazil)	MF	10 March 1994 (age 32)	Fort Lauderdale Strikers	2016		0	0
Forwards
8	Tom Heinemann	(United States)	FW	23 April 1987 (age 39)	Ottawa Fury	2016		5	1
10	Georgi Hristov	(Bulgaria)	FW	10 January 1985 (age 41)	(Bulgaria) Lokomotiv Sofia	2013		83	27
20	Darwin Espinal	(Honduras)	FW	16 January 1995 (age 31)	Darton State College	2015		26	4
29	Carlos Preciado	(Colombia)	FW	30 March 1985 (age 41)	(Qatar) Al-Sailiya SC	2016		0	0

=== On loan ===
Note: Flags indicate national team as defined under FIFA eligibility rules; some limited exceptions apply. Players may hold more than one non-FIFA nationality.

No.	Pos.	Nation	Player
25	DF	USA	Jeremy Hall (at Sacramento Republic for the season)
14	MF	USA	Jeff Michaud (at Wilmington Hammerheads for the season)

No.	Pos.	Nation	Player
55	FW	COD	Danny Mwanga (at Ottawa Fury for the season)
19	MF	FIN	Verneri Välimaa (at Orange County Blues for the season)

=== Staff ===
- (United States) Perry Van der Beck – Assistant General Manager/Vice President of Community Relations
- (Scotland) Stuart Campbell – Head Coach
- (Germany) Raoul Voss – Assistant Coach
- (England) Stuart Dobson – Goalkeeper Coach
- (United States) Ryan Spurr – Director of Team Operations
- (United States) Jason Riley – Strength & Conditioning Coach
- (England) Malcolm Phillips – Equipment Manager
- (United States) Dr. Koco Eaton – Team Physician/Orthopedic Surgeon
- (United States) Dr. Sanjay Menon – Team Physician/Orthopedic Surgeon
- (United States) Dr. Christopher Salud – Team Physician
- (United States) Andrew Keane – Head Athletic Trainer
- (United States) Laura Tllinghast Hine – Yoga Instructor
- (United States) Dr. Samuel Meyers – Team Chiropractor

== Transfers ==
=== Winter/Spring ===
In: Note: Flags indicate national team as defined under FIFA eligibility rules; some limited exceptions apply. Players may hold more than one non-FIFA nationality.

No.	Pos.	Nation	Player
1	GK	AUT	Michael Langer (from (Norway) Vålerenga)
3	DF	SCO	Neill Collins (from (England) Sheffield United)
7	DF	USA	Frank Sanfilippo (from (United States) Fort Lauderdale Strikers)
8	FW	USA	Tom Heinemann (from (United States) Ottawa Fury)
11	MF	GHA	Kalif Alhassan (from (United States) Minnesota United)
21	MF	HON	Walter Ramírez (from (United States) Fort Lauderdale Strikers)
23	MF	USA	Michael Nanchoff (from (United States) Portland Timbers)
25	DF	USA	Jeremy Hall (from (United States) New England Revolution)
30	MF	USA	Eric Avila (from (Mexico) Santos Laguna)
33	MF	ESA	Junior Burgos (loan from (United States) Atlanta United)
55	FW	COD	Danny Mwanga (from (United States) Orlando City)
—	FW	WAL	Eliot Richards (from (England) Cheltenham Town)
26	MF	ENG	Joe Cole (from (England) Coventry City)

Out: Note: Flags indicate national team as defined under FIFA eligibility rules; some limited exceptions apply. Players may hold more than one non-FIFA nationality.

No.	Pos.	Nation	Player
1	GK	SVK	Kamil Čontofalský
3	DF	ESA	Richard Menjivar (to (United States) Rayo OKC)
7	MF	URU	Martin Nuñez
8	MF	BRA	Marcelo Saragosa
11	FW	USA	Corey Hertzog (to (United States) Pittsburgh Riverhounds)
14	MF	USA	Jeff Michaud (loan to (United States) Wilmington Hammerheads)
19	MF	FIN	Verneri Välimaa (loan to (United States) Orange County Blues FC)
21	FW	USA	Brian Shriver (to (United States) Carolina RailHawks)
23	MF	USA	Marquez Fernandez
25	DF	USA	Rich Balchan (to (Canada) Ottawa Fury)
26	FW	VEN	Robert Hernández (to (Venezuela) Caracas)
27	FW	CHN	Long Tan (loan return to (United States) Arizona United)
29	FW	BRA	Maicon Santos (to (United States) Fort Lauderdale Strikers)
33	FW	USA	Zak Boggs (to (United States) Pittsburgh Riverhounds)
44	DF	USA	Gale Agbossoumonde (to (United States) Fort Lauderdale Strikers)
—	FW	WAL	Eliot Richards

=== Summer/Fall ===
In: Note: Flags indicate national team as defined under FIFA eligibility rules; some limited exceptions apply. Players may hold more than one non-FIFA nationality.

No.	Pos.	Nation	Player
32	MF	DEN	Martin Vingaard (from (Denmark) FC Nordsjælland)
29	FW	COL	Carlos Preciado (from (Qatar) Al-Sailiya SC)

Out: Note: Flags indicate national team as defined under FIFA eligibility rules; some limited exceptions apply. Players may hold more than one non-FIFA nationality.

No.	Pos.	Nation	Player
1	GK	AUT	Michael Langer (to (Sweden) IFK Norrköping)
25	DF	USA	Jeremy Hall (loan to (United States) Sacramento Republic)

== Friendlies ==
February 13, 2016 Suncoast Invitational	Tampa Bay Rowdies	0–1	D.C. United	St. Petersburg
19:00 EST (UTC−5)	King (yellow card) 32'; Burgos (yellow card) 41'	Report	Espíndola 27'; Clowes (yellow card) 30'; Birnbaum (yellow card) 43'	Stadium: Al Lang Stadium

February 20, 2016 Suncoast Invitational	Tampa Bay Rowdies	0–2	Philadelphia Union	St. Petersburg
19:00 EST (UTC−5)	Sweat (yellow card) 1'	Report	Tribbett 17'; Fernandes 29'; Anderson (yellow card) 58'; Restrepo (yellow card) 79'	Stadium: Al Lang Stadium; Referee: Jorge Gonzalez

February 27, 2016 Suncoast Invitational	Tampa Bay Rowdies	0–0	Montreal Impact	St. Petersburg
19:00 EST (UTC−5)	Portillos (yellow card) 43'; King (yellow card) 89'	Report	Donadel (yellow card) 12' (yellow-red card) 82'; Cabrera (yellow card) 45'; Venegas (yellow card) 77'	Stadium: Al Lang Stadium

March 5, 2016	USF Bulls	1–3	Tampa Bay Rowdies	Tampa
19:00 EST (UTC−5)	Bartman 38'	Report	King 63'; Espinal (yellow card) 77'; Adu 83'; Heinemann 90+'	Stadium: Corbett Soccer Stadium

March 9, 2016	Nottingham Forest (England)	2–2	(United States) Tampa Bay Rowdies	Nottingham, England
8:30 EST (UTC−5)	Assombalonga 41'; 75'	Report Archived March 10, 2016, at the Wayback Machine; SBN Report Archived September 28, 2022, at the Wayback Machine	Alhassan 16'; Heinemann 79'	Stadium: Nottingham Forest F.C. Training Centre

March 11, 2016	Notts County (England)	2–3	(United States) Tampa Bay Rowdies	Nottingham, England
7:30 EST (UTC−5)	27'; 29'	Report	Mwanga 38'; Espinal 74'; Burgos 81'	Stadium: Forest Sports Zone
Note: Moved from Meadow Lane due to rain.

March 15, 2016	Stoke City (England)	1–1	(United States) Tampa Bay Rowdies	Burton upon Trent, England
9:00 EST (UTC−5)	Abdallah 90+'	Report 1 Archived May 22, 2016, at the Wayback Machine; Report 2	Espinal 54'	Stadium: St George's Park National Football Centre

March 22, 2016 FitzFest	Tampa Spartans	0–3	Tampa Bay Rowdies	Tampa
19:30 EST (UTC−5)	(yellow card) 57'	Report	Adu 20'; Chavez (yellow card) 45'; Nanchoff 47'; Heinemann 81'	Stadium: Pepin Stadium

== Competitions ==
=== NASL Spring season ===
==== Standings ====
Pos	Team	Pld	W	D	L	GF	GA	GD	Pts	Qualification
1	Indy Eleven (S)	10	4	6	0	15	8	+7	18	Playoffs
2	New York Cosmos	10	6	0	4	15	8	+7	18	
3	FC Edmonton	10	5	2	3	9	7	+2	17	
4	Minnesota United	10	5	1	4	16	12	+4	16	
5	Tampa Bay Rowdies	10	4	4	2	11	9	+2	16	
6	Fort Lauderdale Strikers	10	4	3	3	12	12	0	15	
7	Carolina RailHawks	10	4	2	4	11	13	−2	14	
8	Rayo OKC	10	3	3	4	11	12	−1	12	
9	Ottawa Fury	10	2	3	5	9	14	−5	9	
10	Jacksonville Armada	10	1	4	5	5	11	−6	7	
11	Miami FC	10	1	4	5	7	15	−8	7	

Source: NASL
Rules for classification: 1) points; 2) total goal differential; 3) total goals scored; 4) head-to-head record; 5) away goal differential; 6) away goals scored
(S) Spring season champion

==== Results summary ====
Overall								Home						Away					
Pld	W	D	L	GF	GA	GD	Pts	W	D	L	GF	GA	GD	W	D	L	GF	GA	GD
10	4	4	2	11	9	+2	16	2	2	1	5	5	0	2	2	1	6	4	+2

Last updated: 11 June 2016.
Source: Match reports

==== Results by round ====
Round	1	2	3	4	5	6	7	8	9	10
Stadium	A	H	A	H	A	H	A	H	H	A
Result	D	D	W	L	W	D	L	W	W	D
Position	7	5	5	5	5	5	7	6	3	5

Updated to match(es) played on 13 July 2016. Source: Match reports
A = Away; H = Home; W = Win; D = Draw; L = Loss

==== Matches ====
April 2, 2016 1	Tampa Bay Rowdies	0–0	Indy Eleven	St. Petersburg
19:30 EDT (UTC−4)	Collins (yellow card) 40'; King (yellow card) 42'; Burgos (yellow card) 87'	Report; NASL Report; Summary	Ring (yellow card) 87'	Stadium: Al Lang Stadium; Attendance: 5,740; Referee: Geoff Gamble

April 9, 2016 2	Miami	1–1	Tampa Bay Rowdies	Miami
20:00 EDT (UTC−4)	Cvitanich 17', (yellow card) 72'; Palacios (yellow card) 75'	Report; NASL Report; Summary	Sweat (yellow card) 20'; King (yellow card) 42'; Hristov 85' (pen.), (yellow card) 86'	Stadium: FIU Stadium; Attendance: 10,156; Referee: Daniel Radford

April 16, 2016 3	Tampa Bay Rowdies	1–0	Edmonton	St. Petersburg
19:30 EDT (UTC−4)	Guerra (yellow card) 39'; Heinemann 73'; Avila (yellow card) 90+1'; Hristov (yellow card) 90+4'; Collins (yellow card) 90+5'	Report; NASL Report; Summary	Edward (yellow card) 37'; Nyassi (yellow card) 90'; Ameobi (penalty missed) 90+6'	Stadium: Al Lang Stadium; Attendance: 4,429; Referee: Marcos de Oliveira

April 23, 2016 4	Tampa Bay Rowdies	1–3	Carolina RailHawks	St. Petersburg
19:30 EDT (UTC−4)	Mkandawire 65'; Guerra (yellow card) 72'; Nanchoff (yellow card) 85'	Report; NASL Report; Summary	Pérez 45', (yellow card) 58'; Marcelin 47'; Beckie (yellow card) 49'; Shriver 87' (pen.)	Stadium: Al Lang Stadium; Attendance: 5,948; Referee: Robert Sibiga

April 30, 2016 5	Fort Lauderdale Strikers	0–1	Tampa Bay Rowdies	Fort Lauderdale
19:00 EDT (UTC−4)	Attakora (yellow card) 27'; Gonzalez (yellow card) 48'; Agbossoumonde (yellow card) 56'; Zapata (yellow card) 85'	Report; NASL Report; Summary	Mkandawire (yellow card) 37'; Nanchoff (yellow card) 39'; Guerra (yellow card) 47'; King (yellow card) 68'; Heinemann (yellow card) 70'; Collins 77'	Stadium: Lockhart Stadium; Attendance: 1,086; Referee: Younes Marrakchi

May 14, 2016 6	Tampa Bay Rowdies	1–1	Rayo OKC	St. Petersburg
EDT (UTC−4)	Juanan 74' (o.g.)	Report; NASL Report	Michel 54', (yellow card) 86'; Boateng (yellow card) 71'	Stadium: Al Lang Stadium; Attendance: 6,702; Referee: Caleb Mendez

May 22, 2016 7	New York Cosmos	2–1	Tampa Bay Rowdies	Hempstead
EDT (UTC−4)	Duk 32'; Mendes (yellow card) 36'; Bover 40', (yellow card) 57'	Report; NASL Report	Heinemann 18'; Burgos (yellow card) 84'	Stadium: James M. Shuart Stadium; Attendance: 6,243; Referee: Mike Lavergne

May 28, 2016 8	Minnesota United	0–2	Tampa Bay Rowdies	Blaine
EDT (UTC−4)	Watson (yellow card) 11'; Ibson (yellow card) 59'	Report; NASL Report	Collins (yellow card) 33'; Cole 42'; Avila 47'; Guerra (yellow card) 83'; Mwanga (yellow card) 90+4'	Stadium: National Sports Center; Attendance: 7,915; Referee: Luis Guardia

June 4, 2016 9	Tampa Bay Rowdies	2–1	Ottawa Fury	St. Petersburg
EDT (UTC−4)	Hristov 20', 52', (yellow card) 60'; Alhassan (yellow card) 22'	Report; NASL Report	Haworth 49'; Alves (yellow card) 73'; Steele (yellow card) 82'; Olivera (yellow card) 90+'	Stadium: Al Lang Stadium; Attendance: 6,078

June 11, 2016 10	Jacksonville Armada	1–1	Tampa Bay Rowdies	Jacksonville
EDT (UTC−4)	Nicklaw (red card) 46'; Sandoval 52'; Navarro (yellow card) 89'	Report; NASL Report	Sweat (yellow card) 12'; Burgos 84'	Stadium: Community First Park; Attendance: 4,013; Referee: Mark Kadlecik

=== NASL Fall season ===
==== Standings ====
Pos	Team	Pld	W	D	L	GF	GA	GD	Pts	Qualification
1	New York Cosmos (F)	22	14	5	3	44	21	+23	47	Playoffs
2	Indy Eleven	22	11	4	7	36	25	+11	37	
3	FC Edmonton	22	10	6	6	16	14	+2	36	
4	Rayo OKC	22	9	8	5	28	21	+7	35	
5	Miami FC	22	9	6	7	31	27	+4	33	
6	Fort Lauderdale Strikers	22	7	5	10	19	28	−9	26	
7	Carolina RailHawks	22	7	5	10	25	35	−10	26	
8	Minnesota United	22	6	7	9	25	25	0	25	
9	Puerto Rico	22	5	9	8	19	31	−12	24	
10	Tampa Bay Rowdies	22	5	8	9	29	32	−3	23	
11	Jacksonville Armada	22	5	8	9	25	35	−10	23	
12	Ottawa Fury	22	5	7	10	23	26	−3	22	

Source: NASL
Rules for classification: 1) points; 2) total goal differential; 3) total goals scored; 4) head-to-head record; 5) away goal differential; 6) away goals scored
(F) Fall season champion

==== Results summary ====
Overall								Home						Away					
Pld	W	D	L	GF	GA	GD	Pts	W	D	L	GF	GA	GD	W	D	L	GF	GA	GD
22	5	8	9	29	32	−3	23	4	5	2	17	12	+5	1	3	7	12	20	−8

Last updated: 26 April 2018.
Source: Match reports

==== Results by round ====
Round	1	2	3	4	5	6	7	8	9	10	11	12	13	14	15	16	17	18	19	20	21	22
Stadium	H	A	H	H	A	A	H	A	A	H	H	A	A	H	A	H	H	A	A	H	H	A
Result	D	L	W	D	L	L	W	L	L	L	W	D	D	W	W	D	D	L	D	L	D	L
Position	10	11	7																			10

Updated to match(es) played on 6 July 2016. Source: Match reports
A = Away; H = Home; W = Win; D = Draw; L = Loss

==== Matches ====
July 2, 2016 1	Tampa Bay Rowdies	1–1	Jacksonville Armada FC	St. Petersburg
19:30 EDT (UTC−4)	Hristov 13'; Guerra (yellow card) 90'	Report	Steinberger 12'; Ruthven (yellow card) 45'; Navarro (yellow card) 75'; Scaglia (yellow card) 90'	Stadium: Al Lang Stadium; Attendance: 7,690; Referee: Luis Guardia

July 9, 2016 2	Carolina RailHawks	4–1	Tampa Bay Rowdies	Cary
19:30 EDT (UTC−4)	Fondy 11'; Shriver 55' (pen.); Albadawi 59' (pen.), 71'; Hassan (yellow card) 86'	Report	Hristov 20' (pen.); Guerra (yellow card) 22'	Stadium: WakeMed Soccer Park; Attendance: 4,176; Referee: Nima Saghafi

July 16, 2016 3	Tampa Bay Rowdies	3–0	Puerto Rico FC	St. Petersburg
19:30 EDT (UTC−4)	Cole 10'; Avila 25'; Nanchoff (yellow card) 63'; King (yellow card) 78'; Heinemann 90+3'	Report	Dawson (yellow card) 33'; Rivera (yellow card) 76'	Stadium: Al Lang Stadium; Attendance: 5,873; Referee: Rubiel Vazquez

July 23, 2016 4	Tampa Bay Rowdies	2–2	New York Cosmos	St. Petersburg
19:30 EDT (UTC−4)	Vanguard (yellow card) 30'; Nanchoff (yellow card) 45'; Hristov (yellow card) 54'; King (yellow card) 58'; Ayoze 84' (o.g.); Cole 90+6' (pen.)	Report	Arango 53', (yellow card) 82'; Duk (yellow card) 62', (goal) 67'; Diosa (yellow card) 83'; Arrieta (yellow card) 90+3'; Ockford (yellow card) 90+5'	Stadium: Al Lang Stadium; Attendance: 6,301; Referee: Caleb Mendez

July 27, 2016 5	Rayo OKC	1–0	Tampa Bay Rowdies	Yukon
21:00 EDT (UTC−4)	Kimura (yellow card) 23'; Forbes 43'	Report	Ramírez (yellow card) 21'	Stadium: Miller Stadium; Attendance: 3,413; Referee: Baboucarr Jallow

July 30, 2016 6	Ottawa Fury FC	2–0	Tampa Bay Rowdies	Ottawa
19:00 EDT (UTC−4)	Roberts 2', (yellow card) 16'; Mkandawire 36' (o.g.); Tissot (yellow card) 64'	Report	Hristov (yellow card) 37'; King (yellow card) 70'	Stadium: TD Place Stadium; Attendance: 5,225; Referee: Juan Marquez

August 6, 2016 7	Tampa Bay Rowdies	2–1	Fort Lauderdale Strikers	St. Petersburg
19:30 EDT (UTC−4)	Mkandawire (yellow card) 21'; Savage 50', (yellow card) 55'; Cole 58'	Report	Agbossoumonde (yellow card) 19'; Fernandes (yellow card) 61'; Angulo 71'	Stadium: Al Lang Stadium; Attendance: 4,997; Referee: Ismail Elfath

August 13, 2016 8	New York Cosmos	3–2	Tampa Bay Rowdies	Hempstead
19:00 EDT (UTC−4)	Ayoze (yellow card) 22'; Mulligan (yellow card) 28'; Moffat 39' (pen.), 64' (pen.), (red card) 67'; Duk (yellow card) 67'; Diosa 90+3'; Flores (yellow card) 90+6'	Report	Cole 11', (yellow card) 63'; PC 14', (yellow card) 59'; Guerra (yellow card) 20'; Mkandawire (yellow card) 36'; King (red card) 67'; Collins (yellow card) 67'	Stadium: James M. Shuart Stadium; Attendance: 3,489; Referee: Nima Saghafi

August 17, 2016 9	Minnesota United FC	2–0	Tampa Bay Rowdies	Blaine
20:00 EDT (UTC−4)	Speas 18'; Lowe (yellow card) 21'; Ramírez 62'; Blake (red card) 82'; Ndjock (yellow card) 87'	Report	Guerra (yellow card) 14'; PC (yellow card) 63'; Cole (yellow card) 80'	Stadium: National Sports Center; Attendance: 8,207; Referee: Rosendo Mendoza

August 20, 2016 10	Tampa Bay Rowdies	0–1	FC Edmonton	St. Petersburg
19:30 EDT (UTC−4)	Chavez (yellow card) 35'	Report	Nicklaw (yellow card) 16'; Watson (yellow card) 69'; Fordyce 74' (pen.), (yellow card) 84'; Diakité (yellow card) 90+2'	Stadium: Al Lang Stadium; Attendance: 4,596; Referee: Guido Gonzalez

August 27, 2016 11	Tampa Bay Rowdies	2–0	Rayo OKC	St. Petersburg
19:30 EDT (UTC−4)	Ramírez (yellow card) 12'; Cole 61', 70'; Chavez (yellow card) 77'	Report	Menjivar (yellow card) 9'; Boateng (yellow card) 39' van Schaik (yellow card) 45'; Samaras (yellow card) 77'	Stadium: Al Lang Stadium; Attendance: 4,935; Referee: Geoff Gamble

September 3, 2016 12	Indy Eleven	1–1	Tampa Bay Rowdies	Indianapolis
19:30 EDT (UTC−4)	Paterson (yellow card) 29'; Gordon 34'; Smart (yellow card) 45+1'; Vuković (yellow card) 88'; Torrado (yellow card) 89'	Report	Chavez 28'; Vingaard (yellow card) 42'; Nanchoff (yellow card) 88'	Stadium: Carroll Stadium; Referee: Edvin Jurisevic

September 10, 2016 13	Puerto Rico FC	0–0	Tampa Bay Rowdies	Bayamón
13:40 EDT (UTC−4)		Report	Mkandawire (yellow card) 31'	Stadium: Juan Ramón Loubriel Stadium; Attendance: 3,975; Referee: Sandy Vasquez

September 17, 2016 14	Tampa Bay Rowdies	1–0	Carolina RailHawks	St. Petersburg
19:30 EDT (UTC−4)	Ávila 22'; Chavez (yellow card) 38'	Report	Bravo (yellow card) 87'	Stadium: Al Lang Stadium; Attendance: 6,054; Referee: Marcos de Oliveira

September 24, 2016 15	Fort Lauderdale Strikers	1–4	Tampa Bay Rowdies	Lauderhill
19:00 EDT (UTC−4)	Núñez 4', (yellow card) 87'	Report	Hristov 15', 43', 83', (yellow card) 65'; Heinemann 37'; King (yellow card) 87'	Stadium: Central Broward Stadium; Attendance: 1,509; Referee: Alejandro Mariscal

October 1, 2016 16	Tampa Bay Rowdies	1–1	Miami FC	St. Petersburg
19:30 EDT (UTC−4)	Preciado (yellow card) 26'; Ávila 31'; Vingaard (yellow card) 55'	Report	Freeman (yellow card) 57'; Bernstein 74'	Stadium: Al Lang Stadium; Attendance: 6,912; Referee: Ted Unkel

October 5, 2016 17	Tampa Bay Rowdies	2–2	Minnesota United FC	St. Petersburg
19:30 EDT (UTC−4)	Hristov 31', (yellow card) 55'; Savage (yellow card) 73', (goal) 90+3'	Report	Ramirez 17'; Banks 51'; Klute (yellow card) 82'; Davis (yellow card) 88'	Stadium: Al Lang Stadium; Attendance: 4,804; Referee: Rubiel Vazquez

October 9, 2016 18	FC Edmonton	1–0	Tampa Bay Rowdies	Edmonton
16:00 EDT (UTC−4)	Fisk 13'; Eckersley (yellow card) 30'	Report	PC (yellow card) 72'	Stadium: Clarke Stadium; Attendance: 1,243; Referee: Juan Marquez

October 14, 2017 19	Miami FC	2–2	Tampa Bay Rowdies	Miami
20:00 EST (UTC−5)	Chávez 16', (yellow card) 73'; Poku 21'	Report	Hristov 27'; PC (yellow card) 65'; Guerra 67'; Preciado (yellow card) 83'; Mkandawire (yellow card) 90+1'	Stadium: FIU Stadium; Attendance: 5,215; Referee: José Rivero

October 19, 2016 20	Tampa Bay Rowdies	2–3	Indy Eleven	St. Petersburg
19:30 EST (UTC−5)	Cole 53', 68'	Report	Lacroix 15'; Reinoso 31'; Paterson (yellow card) 36', (goal) 85'; Janicki (yellow card) 75'; Ring (yellow card) 90'	Stadium: Al Lang Stadium; Attendance: 5,348; Referee: Marcos de Oliveira

October 22, 2016 21	Tampa Bay Rowdies	1–1	Ottawa Fury FC	St. Petersburg
19:30 EST (UTC−5)	King (red card) 25'; Pickens (yellow card) 45+11'; Hristov 48', (yellow card) 90+3' (yellow-red card) 90+5'; PC (yellow card) 90+3'	Report	Tissot 27'; Alves (yellow card) 44'; Obasi (yellow card) 70'; Edward (yellow card) 45+3' (yellow-red card) 89'	Stadium: Al Lang Stadium; Attendance: 7,641; Referee: Mark Kadlecik

October 30, 2016 22	Jacksonville Armada FC	3–2	Tampa Bay Rowdies	Jacksonville
16:00 EDT (UTC−4)	Keita 29'; Dixon (yellow card) 59'; Johnson 83'; Steinberger 84'	Report	Vingaard 4', (yellow card) 45'; Savage 19'	Stadium: Community First Park; Attendance: 4,572; Referee: Alejandro Mariscal

=== U.S. Open Cup ===
Tampa Bay Rowdies will compete in the 2016 edition of the Open Cup.

June 1, 2016 Third Round	Tampa Bay Rowdies (Florida)	1–0	(Ohio) FC Cincinnati	St. Petersburg
7:30 p.m. EDT	Hristov 11'; King (yellow card) 78'; Cole (yellow card) 90'	Report	Walker (yellow card) 70'; Bone (yellow card) 90'	Stadium: Al Lang Stadium; Attendance: 3,455; Referee: Rubiel Vazquez

June 15, 2016 Fourth Round	Columbus Crew SC (Ohio)	4–0	(Florida) Tampa Bay Rowdies	Columbus
EDT	Meram 41'; Martínez 48'; Finlay 52' (pen.); Hollingsworth 65'	Report	King (yellow card) 51'	Stadium: Jesse Owens Memorial Stadium; Attendance: 1,064; Referee: Greg Dopka

== Squad statistics ==
As of Match played 2 July 2016

=== Appearances and goals ===
No.	Pos	Nat	Player	Total		NASL Spring Season		NASL Fall Season		U.S. Open Cup	
No.	Pos	Nat	Player	Apps	Goals	Apps	Goals	Apps	Goals	Apps	Goals
2	DF	(United States) USA	Darnell King	13	0	10	0	1	0	2	0
3	DF	(Scotland) SCO	Neill Collins	13	1	10	1	1	0	2	0
4	DF	(United States) USA	Ben Sweat	7	0	5	0	0	0	2	0
5	DF	(Serbia) SRB	Stefan Antonijevic	1	0	0	0	0+1	0	0	0
7	DF	(United States) USA	Frankie Sanfilippo	1	0	0	0	0	0	1	0
8	FW	(United States) USA	Tom Heinemann	11	2	6+3	2	0+1	0	1	0
10	FW	(Bulgaria) BUL	Georgi Hristov	13	5	5+5	3	1	1	2	1
11	MF	(Ghana) GHA	Kalif Alhassan	12	0	10	0	1	0	0+1	0
13	MF	(United States) USA	Justin Chavez	8	0	2+3	0	0+1	0	0+2	0
15	DF	(United States) USA	Zac Portillos	5	0	5	0	0	0	0	0
16	MF	(Venezuela) VEN	Juan Guerra	12	0	9	0	1	0	2	0
17	DF	(England) ENG	Tamika Mkandawire	12	1	10	1	1	0	1	0
18	GK	(United States) USA	Matt Pickens	13	0	10	0	1	0	2	0
20	FW	(Honduras) HON	Darwin Espinal	3	0	0+3	0	0	0	0	0
21	MF	(Honduras) HON	Walter Ramírez	8	0	1+4	0	1	0	1+1	0
23	MF	(United States) USA	Michael Nanchoff	10	0	9	0	1	0	0	0
26	MF	(England) ENG	Joe Cole	7	1	5	1	0	0	2	0
30	MF	(United States) USA	Eric Avila	13	1	10	1	1	0	2	0
33	MF	(El Salvador) ESA	Junior Burgos	8	1	2+3	1	1	0	2	0
55	FW	(Democratic Republic of the Congo) COD	Danny Mwanga	9	0	1+7	0	0	0	0+1	0
Players who appeared for the Tampa Bay Rowdies who left the club during the season:

=== Goal scorers ===
Place	Position	Nation	Number	Name	NASL Spring Season	NASL Fall Season	U.S. Open Cup	Total
1	FW	(Bulgaria)	10	Georgi Hristov	3	7	1	11
2	MF	(England)	26	Joe Cole	1	8	0	9
3	FW	(United States)	8	Tom Heinemann	2	2	0	4
3	MF	(United States)	30	Eric Avila	1	3	0	4
5	MF	(United States)	22	Keith Savage	0	3	0	3
6	DF	(Scotland)	3	Neill Collins	1	0	0	1
6	DF	(England)	17	Tamika Mkandawire	1	0	0	1
6	MF	(El Salvador)	33	Junior Burgos	1	0	0	1
6	MF	(United States)	13	Justin Chavez	0	1	0	1
6	MF	(Denmark)	32	Martin Vingaard	0	1	0	1
6	MF	(Venezuela)	16	Juan Guerra	0	1	0	1
6	MF	(Brazil)	94	PC	0	1	0	1
TOTALS					10	27	1	38

=== Disciplinary record ===
Number	Nation	Position	Name	NASL Spring Season		NASL Fall Season		U.S. Open Cup		Total	
Number	Nation	Position	Name	Yellow card	Red card	Yellow card	Red card	Yellow card	Red card	Yellow card	Red card
2	(United States)	DF	Darnell King	3	0	0	0	2	0	5	0
3	(Scotland)	DF	Neill Collins	3	0	0	0	0	0	3	0
4	(United States)	DF	Ben Sweat	2	0	0	0	0	0	2	0
8	(United States)	FW	Tom Heinemann	1	0	0	0	0	0	1	0
10	(Bulgaria)	FW	Georgi Hristov	3	0	0	0	0	0	3	0
11	(Ghana)	MF	Kalif Alhassan	1	0	0	0	0	0	1	0
15	(United States)	DF	Zac Portillos	1	0	0	0	0	0	1	0
16	(Venezuela)	MF	Juan Guerra	4	0	1	0	0	0	5	0
17	(England)	DF	Tamika Mkandawire	1	0	0	0	0	0	1	0
23	(United States)	MF	Michael Nanchoff	2	0	0	0	0	0	2	0
26	(England)	MF	Joe Cole	0	0	0	0	1	0	1	0
30	(United States)	MF	Eric Avila	1	0	0	0	0	0	1	0
33	(El Salvador)	MF	Junior Burgos	2	0	0	0	0	0	2	0
55	(Democratic Republic of the Congo)	FW	Danny Mwanga	1	0	0	0	0	0	1	0
			TOTALS	26	0	1	0	3	0	28	0

== Honors ==
=== Individual honors ===
- NASL Best XI

Joe Cole
