= 2015 Tampa Bay Rowdies season =

Tampa Bay Rowdies
2015 season
- Owners: Bill Edwards (Majority); Andrew Nestor (Minority); David Laxer (Minority)
- Head coach: Stuart Campbell (after Aug 21) / Thomas Rongen (until Aug 21)
- Stadium: Al Lang Stadium
- NASL: Spring: 2nd Place; Fall: 8th Place; Combined: 5th Place
- NASL Playoffs: did not qualify
- U.S. Open Cup: Third round
- Top goalscorer: League: Maicon Santos (7); All: Maicon Santos (12)
- Highest home attendance: 7,010 (sellout) (Apr. 11 vs. Minnesota)
- Lowest home attendance: 4,217 (June 13 vs. Atlanta)
- Average home league attendance: 5,857
Home colors	Away colors	Third colors

The 2015 season was the current Tampa Bay Rowdies sixth season of existence, and fifth playing in the North American Soccer League, the second tier of American soccer pyramid. Including the original Rowdies franchise and the Tampa Bay Mutiny, this was the 28th season of professional soccer in the Tampa Bay area.

== Summary ==
The Tampa Bay Rowdies' new manager was Thomas Rongen, replacing Ricky Hill, who was dismissed after the 2014 season. Rongen had a prior connection to soccer in the area, as he was the first manager of the MLS Tampa Bay Mutiny during their inaugural season of 1996. The Rowdies brought back another familiar local figure when Farrukh Quraishi, who had been a player and a youth development director for the original Rowdies, was named general manager.

In March 2015, the Rowdies traveled to Portugal to play several preseason friendlies against clubs in the Portuguese second and third divisions. It was the first time that the current club had undertaken an international tour.

The Rowdies lost only one match during the NASL spring season, good for second place in the table. After starting the fall season 2–1–6, however, club owner Bill Edwards dismissed both manager Thomas Rongen and general manager Farrukh Quraishi, much to the chagrin of many of the team's fans. "They had a five-year plan, and I have a one-year plan," said Edwards regarding the firings. Assistant Stuart Campbell was promoted to manager and led the team to a 3-4-4 record. The Rowdies finished the fall season in 8th out of 11 teams in the league table and missed the playoffs.

== Club ==
as of November 14, 2015

No.	Position	Nation	Player
2	DF	USA	Darnell King
3	MF	ESA	Richard Menjivar
4	DF	USA	Ben Sweat
5	DF	SRB	Stefan Antonijevic
9	MF	USA	Freddy Adu
10	MF	BUL	Georgi Hristov
13	MF	USA	Justin Chavez
14	MF	USA	Jeff Michaud
15	DF	USA	Zac Portillos
16	MF	VEN	Juan Francisco Guerra
17	DF	ENG	Tamika Mkandawire
18	GK	USA	Matt Pickens
19	MF	FIN	Verneri Välimaa
20	FW	HON	Darwin Espinal
21	FW	USA	Brian Shriver
22	MF	USA	Keith Savage
24	GK	USA	Chris Glodack
26	FW	VEN	Robert Hernández
29	FW	BRA	Maicon Santos

#8 Forward, Marcelo Saragosa of Brazil served as team captain

=== Technical staff ===
- (England) Farrukh Quraishi – President & General Manager (fired August 21, 2015)
- (United States) Perry Van der Beck – Assistant General Manager/Vice President of Community Relations
- (Netherlands) Thomas Rongen - Head Coach (fired August 21, 2015)
- (Scotland) Stuart Campbell – Assistant Coach (promoted to head coach August 2015)
- (England) Stuart Dobson - Goalkeeper Coach
- (United States) Eric Arbuzow - Assistant Coach
- (United States) Ryan Spurr – Director of Team Operations
- (United States) Jason Riley – Strength & Conditioning Coach
- (England) Malcolm Phillips – Equipment Manager
- (United States) Dr. Koco Eaton - Team Physician/Orthopedic Surgeon
- (United States) Dr. Sanjay Menon – Team Physician/Orthopedic Surgeon
- (United States) Dr. Christopher Salud – Team Physician
- (United States) Andrew Keane - Head Athletic Trainer
- (United States) Laura Tllinghast Hine - Yoga Instructor
- (United States) Dr. Samuel Meyers - Team Chiropractor

=== Front office ===
- (United States) Bill Edwards – Chairman, Chief Executive Officer & Governor
- (United States) Andrew Nestor – Director
- (United States) David Laxer – Director
- (United States) Lee Cohen – Vice President & Chief Operating Officer

== Competitions ==
Win Tie Loss

=== Friendlies ===
February 10, 2015 Preseason	Tampa Bay Rowdies	1–0	Philadelphia Union	Clearwater, Florida
6:00 p.m. EDT	Herzog 67' (pen.)	Report	Hoppenot (yellow card) 53'; Pfeffer (yellow card) 78'	Stadium: Joe DiMaggio Complex; Attendance: 2,000

February 12, 2015 Preseason	Tampa Bay Rowdies (United States)	0–4	(Sweden) Malmö FF	Bradenton, Florida
7:00 p.m. EDT	Barrientos (yellow card) 85'	Report	Eikrem 32'; Rosenberg 42'; Johansson 43'; Cibicki 69'	Stadium: IMG Academy

March 1, 2015 Preseason	C.D. Fátima (Portugal)	0–1	(United States) Tampa Bay Rowdies	Fátima, Portugal
10:30 p.m. EDT		Report	Portillos 85'	Stadium: Estádio Municipal

March 3, 2015 Preseason	S.L. Benfica U-20 (Portugal)	1–3	(United States) Tampa Bay Rowdies	Seixal, Portugal
10:30 p.m. EDT	50' (pen.)	Report	Hristov 10' (pen.); Savage 19'; Espinal 75'	Stadium: Caixa Futebol Campus

March 4, 2015 Preseason	Sporting CP B (Portugal)	3–2	(United States) Tampa Bay Rowdies	Lisbon, Portugal
10:30 p.m. EDT	12'; 73'; 78'	Report	Espinal 31'; Boggs 74'	Stadium: Academia Sporting

March 6, 2015 Preseason	AC Alcanenense (Portugal)	1–1	(United States) Tampa Bay Rowdies	Rio Maior, Portugal
10:30 p.m. EDT	66' (pen.)	Report	Santos 15'

March 13, 2015 Preseason	Tampa Bay Rowdies	1–1	FC Montreal	St. Petersburg, Florida
1:00 p.m. EDT	Santos 68'; Boggs (yellow card) 77'	Report	N’Diaye 46'	Stadium: Al Lang Stadium; Attendance: Closed-door due to ongoing construction.

March 18, 2015 Preseason; Fitz Fest	Tampa Spartans	1–4	Tampa Bay Rowdies	Tampa, Florida
7:00 p.m. EDT	Campbell 63'	Report	Santos 10', 42'; Hertzog 18' (pen.); Michaud 90+'	Stadium: Naimoli Athletic Complex

March 21, 2015 Preseason	USF Bulls	1–4	Tampa Bay Rowdies	Tampa, Florida
7:00 p.m. EDT	Hines-Ike 62' (pen.)	Report	Santos 3'; 18' (o.g.); Hertzog 43'; Nuñez 62'	Stadium: Corbett Soccer Stadium

March 25, 2015 Preseason	Tampa Bay Rowdies	2–1	FC Edmonton	Jacksonville, Florida
5:00 p.m. EDT	King (yellow card) 27'; Guerra (yellow card) 32'; Hernández (yellow card) 33'; Hristov 65' (pen.); Pickens (yellow card) 70'; Shriver 84'	Report	Raudales (yellow card) 27'; Jones (yellow card) 30'; Jonke 84'	Stadium: Southern Oak Stadium

March 28, 2015 Preseason	Jacksonville Armada FC	0–2	Tampa Bay Rowdies	Jacksonville, Florida
5:00 p.m. EDT	Safi (yellow card) 24'; Roserie (yellow card) 70'	Report	Savage 43'; Shriver 58'	Stadium: EverBank Field; Attendance: 6,674

April 22, 2015 Scrimmage	Tampa Bay Rowdies	5–0	Guelph Gryphons	St. Petersburg, Florida
11:30 a.m. EDT	Michaud 5'; Fernandez 40'; Nuñez 55'; Hertzog 58'; Välimaa 88'	Report		Stadium: Al Lang Field

June 29, 2015 Scrimmage	Tampa Bay Rowdies (United States)	2–4 (a.e.t.)	Haiti	Bradenton, Florida
9:30 a.m. EDT	Espinal; Hristov 88'	Report	Jaggy; 82'; 104'; 117'	Stadium: IMG Academy
Note: Four 30-minute periods.

=== NASL Spring season ===
==== Standings ====
Pos	Team	Pld	W	D	L	GF	GA	GD	Pts	Qualification
1	New York Cosmos (S)	10	5	5	0	18	9	+9	20	Playoffs
2	Tampa Bay Rowdies	10	5	4	1	15	9	+6	19	
3	Carolina RailHawks	10	3	5	2	15	10	+5	14	
4	Minnesota United	10	3	5	2	15	13	+2	14	
5	Indy Eleven	10	3	4	3	13	12	+1	13	
6	Jacksonville Armada	10	3	3	4	15	18	−3	12	
7	San Antonio Scorpions	10	3	3	4	11	15	−4	12	
8	Fort Lauderdale Strikers	10	3	2	5	12	13	−1	11	
9	Ottawa Fury	10	2	5	3	5	8	−3	11	
10	FC Edmonton	10	2	3	5	16	22	−6	9	
11	Atlanta Silverbacks	10	1	5	4	7	13	−6	8	

Source: NASL
Rules for classification: 1) points; 2) total goal differential; 3) total goals scored; 4) head-to-head record; 5) away goal differential; 6) away goals scored
(S) Spring season champion

==== Results summary ====
Overall								Home						Away					
Pld	W	D	L	GF	GA	GD	Pts	W	D	L	GF	GA	GD	W	D	L	GF	GA	GD
10	5	4	1	14	8	+6	19	4	1	0	9	3	+6	1	3	1	5	5	0

Last updated: June 15, 2015.
Source: Match reports

==== Results by round ====
Round	1	2	3	4	5	6	7	8	9	10
Stadium	A	H	A	H	A	A	H	A	H	H
Result	W	D	L	W	D	D	W	D	W	W
Position	1	1	5	2	2	3	2	4	2	2

Updated to match(es) played on June 15, 2015. Source: Match reports
A = Away; H = Home; W = Win; D = Draw; L = Loss

==== Match reports ====
April 4, 2015 Match 1	San Antonio Scorpions	1–3	Tampa Bay Rowdies	San Antonio, Texas
7:30 p.m. EDT	Soto (yellow card) 16'; Chávez (yellow card) 55'; Elizondo (yellow card) 64'; James (yellow card) 80' (yellow-red card) 90'; Cummings 90'	Report	Antonijevic 10'; Savage (yellow card) 17'; Espinal (yellow card) 27', (goal) 45+'; Hernández (yellow card) 40'; Saragosa (yellow card) 45'; Guerra (yellow card) 47'; Hertzog 61'; Portillos (yellow card) 75'	Stadium: Toyota Field; Attendance: 6,723; Referee: Daniel Radford

April 11, 2015 Match 2	Tampa Bay Rowdies	0–0	Minnesota United FC	St. Petersburg, Florida
7:30 p.m. EDT	Hernández (yellow card) 21'; King (yellow card) 37'; Mkandawire (yellow card) 63'; Chavez (yellow card) 90'	Report	Venegas (yellow card) 12'; Campos (yellow card) 89'	Stadium: Al Lang Stadium; Attendance: 7,010 (Sellout); Referee: Kevin Terry, Jr.

April 18, 2015 Match 3	New York Cosmos	2–0	Tampa Bay Rowdies	Hempstead, New York
7:30 p.m. EDT	Senna 11' (pen.); Fernandes (yellow card) 17', (goal) 48'; Gorskie (yellow card) 28'; Stokkelien (yellow card) 76'	Report	Guerra (yellow card) 29'; Mkandawire (yellow card) 37'; Hristov (yellow card) 64'; Santos (yellow card) 70'; Antonijevic (yellow card) 78'	Stadium: James M. Shuart Stadium; Attendance: 12,550; Referee: Robert Sibiga

April 25, 2015 Match 4 Coastal Cup	Tampa Bay Rowdies	3–2	Jacksonville Armada FC	St. Petersburg, Florida
7:30 p.m. EDT	Santos 12' (pen.), 77'; Boggs (yellow card) 50'; Nuñez 59'; Hristov (yellow card) 90'	Report	Flores 14', (yellow card) 47'; Johnson 32'; Ortiz (yellow card) 41'	Stadium: Al Lang Stadium; Attendance: 5,460; Referee: Daniel Fitzgerald

May 2, 2015 Match 5	Carolina RailHawks	1–1	Tampa Bay Rowdies	Cary, North Carolina
7:00 p.m. EDT	Novo 6'	Report	Nuñez 19'; Sweat (yellow card) 25'; Hristov (red card) 76'; Mkandawire (yellow card) 90+4'	Stadium: WakeMed Soccer Park; Attendance: 4,042; Referee: Chris Penso

May 9, 2015 Match 6	Ottawa Fury FC	0–0	Tampa Bay Rowdies	Ottawa, Ontario
7:30 p.m. EDT	Falvey (yellow card) 50'	Report	King (yellow card) 57'	Stadium: TD Place Stadium; Attendance: 3,461; Referee: David Barrie

May 16, 2015 Match 7 Coastal Cup	Tampa Bay Rowdies	1–0	Fort Lauderdale Strikers	St. Petersburg, Florida
7:30 p.m. EDT	Hernández 55'	Report	Hassan (yellow card) 85'	Stadium: Al Lang Stadium; Attendance: 6,851; Referee: Alex Chilowicz

May 30, 2015 Match 8	Indy Eleven	2–2	Tampa Bay Rowdies	Indianapolis, Indiana
7:30 p.m. EDT	Mares 22'; Brown (yellow card) 59'; Miller (yellow card) 74'; Hyland 90+8'	Report	Balchan 40'; Antonijevic (yellow card) 43' (yellow-red card) 89'; Santos 68', (red card) 73'; Hernández (yellow card) 72'; Menjivar (yellow card) 88'; Hristov (red card) 90+9'	Stadium: Michael A. Carroll Stadium; Attendance: 10,226; Referee: Baboucarr Jallow

June 6, 2015 Match 9	Tampa Bay Rowdies	2–1	FC Edmonton	St. Petersburg, Florida
7:30 p.m. EDT	Sweat (yellow card) 4'; Espinal 37'; Shriver 60'; Mkandawire (yellow card) 72'; Agbossoumonde (yellow card) 84'	Report	Raudales (yellow card) 45'; Moses (yellow card) 59'; Laing 64'	Stadium: Al Lang Stadium; Attendance: 4,961; Referee: Alejandro Mariscal

June 13, 2015 Match 10	Tampa Bay Rowdies	3–0	Atlanta Silverbacks	St. Petersburg, Florida
7:30 p.m. EDT	Hertzog 60'; Nuñez 75'; Hristov 89' (pen.)	Report	Okafor (yellow card) 71'; Porter (yellow card) 80'; Chavez (yellow card) 85' (yellow-red card) 86'	Stadium: Al Lang Stadium; Attendance: 4,217; Referee: Sorin Stoica

=== NASL Fall season ===
==== Standings ====
Pos	Team	Pld	W	D	L	GF	GA	GD	Pts	Qualification
1	Ottawa Fury (F)	20	13	6	1	37	15	+22	45	Playoffs
2	Minnesota United	20	11	6	3	39	26	+13	39	
3	New York Cosmos	20	10	6	4	31	21	+10	36	
4	Fort Lauderdale Strikers	20	8	6	6	37	27	+10	30	
5	FC Edmonton	20	7	5	8	25	24	+1	26	
6	Atlanta Silverbacks	20	6	7	7	24	27	−3	25	
7	Carolina RailHawks	20	6	3	11	29	39	−10	21	
8	Tampa Bay Rowdies	20	5	5	10	18	28	−10	20	
9	Indy Eleven	20	5	5	10	23	36	−13	20	
10	San Antonio Scorpions	20	4	7	9	30	37	−7	19	
11	Jacksonville Armada	20	5	4	11	18	31	−13	19	

Source: NASL
Rules for classification: 1) points; 2) total goal differential; 3) total goals scored; 4) head-to-head record; 5) away goal differential; 6) away goals scored
(F) Fall season champion

==== Results summary ====
Overall								Home						Away					
Pld	W	D	L	GF	GA	GD	Pts	W	D	L	GF	GA	GD	W	D	L	GF	GA	GD
20	5	5	10	18	28	−10	20	5	2	3	14	12	+2	0	3	7	4	16	−12

Last updated: April 26, 2018.
Source: Match reports

==== Results by round ====
Round	1	2	3	4	5	6	7	8	9	10	11	12	13	14	15	16	17	18	19	20
Stadium	H	A	H	H	A	H	A	A	H	A	H	A	H	A	H	A	H	A	H	A
Result	W	L	L	L	D	W	L	L	L	D	W	L	W	L	D	L	D	D	W	L
Position	4	7	9	9	10	8														8

Updated to match(es) played on August 8, 2015. Source: Match reports
A = Away; H = Home; W = Win; D = Draw; L = Loss

==== Match reports ====
July 4, 2015 Match 1	Tampa Bay Rowdies	2–1	Atlanta Silverbacks	St. Petersburg, Florida
7:30 p.m. EDT	McKenzie 22' (o.g.); King 30'; Hertzog (yellow card) 63'	Report	Antonijevic 36' (o.g.); Mravec (yellow card) 56'	Stadium: Al Lang Stadium; Attendance: 7,002; Referee: Marcos DeOliveira

July 11, 2015 Match 2	San Antonio Scorpions	3–0	Tampa Bay Rowdies	San Antonio, Texas
7:30 p.m. EDT	Chávez 11'; Cummings 54', 61'; Castillo (yellow card) 76'	Report	Guerra (yellow card) 14'; King (yellow card) 26'; Antonijevic (yellow card) 74'	Stadium: Toyota Field; Attendance: 7,636; Referee: Younes Marrakchi

July 18, 2015 Match 3	Tampa Bay Rowdies	0–1	FC Edmonton	St. Petersburg, Florida
7:30 p.m. EDT	Hernández (yellow card) 80'	Report	Antonijevic 56' (o.g.); Jalali (yellow card) 73'	Stadium: Al Lang Stadium; Attendance: 5,496; Referee: Rubio Vasquez

July 25, 2015 Match 4 Coastal Cup	Tampa Bay Rowdies	1–3	Fort Lauderdale Strikers	St. Petersburg, Florida
7:30 p.m. EDT	Nuñez (yellow card) 50'; Agbossoumonde (yellow card) 90'; Santos 90'	Report	PC 16'; Smith (yellow card) 25'; Marcelin (yellow card) 29'; Nunes 79'; Pinho 90'	Stadium: Al Lang Stadium; Attendance: 4,494; Referee: Matthew Kreitzer

August 1, 2015 Match 5	Carolina RailHawks	1–1	Tampa Bay Rowdies	Cary, North Carolina
7:30 p.m. EDT	Anderson 32'; Danso (yellow card) 50'; Novo (yellow card) 90'; Albadawi (yellow card) 90'	Report	Hristov 29'; Guerra (yellow card) 49'	Stadium: WakeMed Soccer Park; Attendance: 6,191; Referee: Daniel Fitzgerald

August 8, 2015 Match 6 Coastal Cup	Tampa Bay Rowdies	3–2	Jacksonville Armada FC	St. Petersburg, Florida
7:30 p.m. EDT	Santos 7', 32'; Nuñez (yellow card) 37'; Shriver 50'; Guerra (yellow card) 61'	Report	Barrett (yellow card) 38'; Keita 54' (pen.), 67'; Trejo (red card) 79'	Stadium: Al Lang Stadium; Attendance: 5,493; Referee: (United States) Kevin Terry Jr

August 15, 2015 Match 7 Coastal Cup	Fort Lauderdale Strikers	2–1	Tampa Bay Rowdies	Ft. Lauderdale, Florida
7:30 p.m. EDT	Stefano 4'; Gabriel (yellow card) 18'; Thomas (yellow card) 30'; Marcelin 43'	Report	Santos 19'; Mkandawire (yellow card) 41'; Saragoza (yellow card) 71'	Stadium: Lockhart Stadium; Attendance: 5,145; Referee: Alejandro Mariscal

August 19, 2015 Match 8	Indy Eleven	2–0	Tampa Bay Rowdies	Indianapolis, Indiana
7:00 p.m. EDT	Steinberger (yellow card) 42'; Richards 60'; Norales 70'	Report	Chavez (yellow card) 31'; Mkandawire (yellow card) 69'	Stadium: Michael A. Carroll Stadium; Attendance: 8,500; Referee: Robert Sibiga

August 22, 2015 Match 9	Tampa Bay Rowdies	1–3	Minnesota United FC	St. Petersburg, Florida
7:00 p.m. EDT	Guerra 28'; Sweat (yellow card) 51'; Menjivar (yellow card) 90'	Report	Ibson 36'; Davis 65'; Vicentini (yellow card) 90'; Mendes 90'	Stadium: Al Lang Stadium; Attendance: 5,059; Referee: Rubiel Vazquez

August 29, 2015 Match 10	Ottawa Fury FC	2–2	Tampa Bay Rowdies	Ottawa, Ontario
7:30 p.m. EDT	Paulo Jr. 18'; Oliver 31'; Eustáquio (yellow card) 82'; Peiser (yellow card) 87'; Hassan (yellow card) 90'	Report	Mkandawire 33'; Espinal 87'	Stadium: TD Place Stadium; Attendance: 6,081; Referee: David Barrie

September 5, 2015 Match 11	Tampa Bay Rowdies	2–0	New York Cosmos	St. Petersburg, Florida
7:00 p.m. EDT	Hertzog (yellow card) 13', (goal) 40'; Guerra 76'	Report	Cáceres (yellow card) 27'; Raúl (yellow card) 42'	Stadium: Al Lang Stadium; Attendance: 5,630

September 13, 2015 Match 12	FC Edmonton	1–0	Tampa Bay Rowdies	Edmonton, Alberta
7:30 p.m. EDT	Watson 16'; Laing (yellow card) 73'	Report		Stadium: Clarke Stadium; Attendance: 4,160; Referee: Justin Tasev

September 19, 2015 Match 13	Tampa Bay Rowdies	2–0	San Antonio Scorpions	St. Petersburg, Florida
7:30 p.m. EDT	Hertzog 50' (pen.); Agbossoumonde (yellow card) 69'; King (yellow card) 82'; Guerra 88'	Report	DeRoux (yellow card) 77'	Stadium: Al Lang Stadium; Attendance: 6,135; Referee: Robert Sibiga

September 26, 2015 Match 14; Coastal Cup	Jacksonville Armada FC	2–0	Tampa Bay Rowdies	Jacksonville, Florida
7:30 p.m. EDT	Scaglia 34'; Millien 74'	Report	Saragosa (yellow card) 78'	Stadium: Baseball Grounds of Jacksonville; Attendance: 7,163; Referee: Alejandro Mariscal

September 30, 2015 Match 15	Tampa Bay Rowdies	1–1	Indy Eleven	St. Petersburg, Florida
7:00 p.m. EDT	Guerra (yellow card) 14'; Menjívar (yellow card) 41'; Tan 63'; Mkandawire (yellow card) 88'	Report	Frias 67'	Stadium: Al Lang Stadium; Attendance: 4,691; Referee: Baboucarr Jallow

October 3, 2015 Match 16	Minnesota United FC	1–0	Tampa Bay Rowdies	Blaine, Minnesota
7:30 p.m. EDT	Vela (yellow card) 35'; Ramirez 44'; Jordan (yellow card) 74'; Davis (yellow card) 86'	Report	Sweat (yellow card) 31' (yellow-red card) 41'	Stadium: National Sports Center; Attendance: 8,932

October 10, 2015 Match 17	Tampa Bay Rowdies	1–1	Ottawa Fury FC	St. Petersburg, Florida
7:00 p.m. EDT	Guerra (yellow card) 17'; Adu (yellow card) 21'; King (yellow card) 65' (yellow-red card) 77'; Chavez (yellow card) 84'; Shriver 88'	Report	Heinemann 42'	Stadium: Al Lang Stadium; Attendance: 5,242; Referee: Daniel Radford

October 17, 2015 Match 18	Atlanta Silverbacks	0–0	Tampa Bay Rowdies	Atlanta, Georgia
7:30 p.m. EDT	Porter (yellow card) 27'	Report	Adu (yellow card) 71'	Stadium: Atlanta Silverbacks Park; Attendance: 4,111; Referee: Hilario Grajeda

October 24, 2015 Match 19	Tampa Bay Rowdies	1–0	Carolina RailHawks	St. Petersburg, Florida
7:30 p.m. EDT	Menjívar 12'	Report		Stadium: Al Lang Stadium; Attendance: 6,973; Referee: Jose Rivero

October 31, 2015 Match 20	New York Cosmos	2–0	Tampa Bay Rowdies	Hempstead, New York
7:30 p.m. EDT	Ayoze (yellow card) 31'; Raúl 54'; Guenzatti 58'	Report	Chavez (yellow card) 41'	Stadium: James M. Shuart Stadium; Attendance: 5,171; Referee: Hilario Grajeda

=== U.S. Open Cup ===
May 27, 2015 Third round	Pittsburgh Riverhounds (Pennsylvania)	1–0	(Florida) Tampa Bay Rowdies	Pittsburgh, Pennsylvania
7:00 p.m. EDT	Vincent 90+1'	Report	Sweat (yellow card) 15'; Hernández (yellow card) 82'	Stadium: Highmark Stadium; Attendance: 1,500; Referee: C. Murphy

== Transfers ==
=== In ===
Date	No.	Pos.	Player	Transferred from	Fee/notes	Source
December 19, 2014	16	MF	(Venezuela) Juan Francisco Guerra	(Venezuela) Deportivo Lara	-	
December 22, 2014	22	DF	(United States) Darnell King	(United States) Fort Lauderdale Strikers	-	
December 22, 2014	44	DF	(United States) Gale Agbossoumonde	(United States) Colorado Rapids	-	
December 23, 2014	7	MF	(Uruguay) Martin Nuñez	(United States) Fort Lauderdale Strikers	-	
December 23, 2014	20	FW	(United States) Darwin Espinal	(United States) Darton State College	-	
December 24, 2014	3	DF	(United States) Brad Rusin	(United States) Orlando City	-	
December 30, 2014	0	MF	(Venezuela) Robert Hernández	(Venezuela) Deportivo Anzoátegui	-	
January 6, 2015	5	DF	(Serbia) Stefan Antonijevic	(United States) Fort Lauderdale Strikers	-	
January 29, 2015	22	MF	(United States) Keith Savage	None	Signed after being released on November 7	
February 3, 2015	8	MF	(Brazil) Marcelo Saragosa	None	-	
February 4, 2015	29	FW	(Brazil) Maicon Santos	None	-	
February 5, 2015	13	MF	(United States) Justin Chavez	(United States) Fort Lauderdale Strikers	-	
February 23, 2015	14	MF	(United States) Jeff Michaud	(United States) Eastern Florida State College	-	
February 23, 2015	23	MF	(United States) Marquez Fernandez	(United States) Maryland-Baltimore County	-	
February 23, 2015	24	GK	(United States) Chris Glodack	(United States) Clemson University	-	
February 23, 2015	15	DF	(United States) Zac Portillos	(United States) University of Akron	-	
February 24, 2015	33	FW	(United States) Zak Boggs	(United States) Charlotte Eagles	-	
February 25, 2015	1	GK	(Slovakia) Kamil Čontofalský	(United States) Fort Lauderdale Strikers	-	
March 2, 2015	4	DF	(United States) Ben Sweat	(United States) Columbus Crew SC	-	
March 30, 2015	19	MF	(United States) Verneri Välimaa	(United States) University of North Carolina	-	
April 29, 2015	3	MF	(El Salvador) Richard Menjivar	(United States) San Antonio Scorpions	Traded for Brad Rusin	
July 29, 2015	28	FW	(United States) Omar Salgado	(Mexico) Tigres UANL	-	

=== Out ===
Date	Pos.	Player	Transferred to	Fee/notes	Source
November 7, 2014	GK	(Venezuela) Diego Restrepo	(United States) Charlotte Independence	-	
November 7, 2014	GK	(United States) Cody Mizell	(Iceland) Knattspyrnufélagið Fram	Free Transfer	
November 7, 2014	DF	(Guyana) J. P. Rodrigues	None	Retirement.	
November 7, 2014	DF	(United States) Jay Needham	None	-	
November 7, 2014	DF	(United States) Willie Hunt	(United States) Pittsburgh Riverhounds	-	
November 7, 2014	MF	(England) Darel Russell	None	-	
November 7, 2014	MF	(United States) Keith Savage	None	-	
November 7, 2014	MF	(United States) Anthony Wallace	(United States) New York Red Bulls	-	
November 7, 2014	MF	(Jamaica) Ricardo Morris	(Jamaica) Montego Bay United F.C.	-	
November 7, 2014	FW	(United States) Devin Del Do	None	-	
November 7, 2014	FW	(Argentina) Luciano Olguín	None	-	
November 7, 2014	FW	(United States) Casey Townsend	(United States) Oklahoma City Energy	-	
November 7, 2014	FW	(Zimbabwe) Lucky Mkosana	(United States) New York Cosmos	-	
January 13, 2015	DF	(United States) Frankie Sanfilippo	(United States) Fort Lauderdale Strikers	-	
January 13, 2015	MF	(England) Shane Hill	None	-	
April 29, 2015	DF	(United States) Brad Rusin	(United States) San Antonio Scorpions	Traded for Richard Menjivar	

== Squad statistics ==
As of Match played 25 July 2015

=== Goal scorers ===
Place	Position	Nation	Number	Name	NASL Spring Season	NASL Fall Season	U.S. Open Cup	Total
1	FW	(Brazil)	29	Maicon Santos	3	1	0	4
2	MF	(Uruguay)	7	Martin Nuñez	3	0	0	3
3	FW	(Honduras)	20	Darwin Espinal	2	0	0	2
3	FW	(United States)	11	Corey Hertzog	2	0	0	2
3	FW	(Bulgaria)	10	Georgi Hristov	1	1	0	2
5	DF	(Serbia)	5	Stefan Antonijevic	1	0	0	1
5	FW	(Venezuela)	26	Robert Hernández	1	0	0	1
5	DF	(United States)	25	Rich Balchan	1	0	0	1
5	FW	(United States)	21	Brian Shriver	1	0	0	1
5	DF	(United States)	2	Darnell King	0	1	0	1
5				Own goal	0	1	0	1
TOTALS					15	4	0	19

=== Disciplinary record ===
Number	Nation	Position	Name	NASL Spring Season		NASL Fall Season		U.S. Open Cup		Total	
Number	Nation	Position	Name	Yellow card	Red card	Yellow card	Red card	Yellow card	Red card	Yellow card	Red card
2	(United States)	DF	Darnell King	2	0	1	0	0	0	3	0
3	(El Salvador)	DF	Richard Menjivar	1	0	0	0	0	0	1	0
4	(United States)	DF	Ben Sweat	2	0	0	0	1	0	2	0
5	(Serbia)	DF	Stefan Antonijevic	3	1	1	0	0	0	4	1
7	(Uruguay)	FW	Martin Nunez	0	0	1	0	0	0	1	0
8	(Brazil)	FW	Marcelo Saragosa	1	0	0	0	0	0	1	0
10	(Bulgaria)	FW	Georgi Hristov	2	2	0	0	0	0	2	2
11	(United States)	MF	Corey Hertzog	0	0	1	0	0	0	1	0
13	(United States)	MF	Justin Chavez	1	0	0	0	0	0	1	0
15	(United States)	DF	Zac Portillos	1	0	0	0	0	0	1	0
16	(Venezuela)	MF	Juan Francisco Guerra	2	0	2	0	0	0	4	0
17	(England)	DF	Tamika Mkandawire	4	0	0	0	0	0	4	0
20	(Honduras)	FW	Darwin Espinal	1	0	0	0	0	0	1	0
22	(United States)	MF	Keith Savage	1	0	0	0	0	0	1	0
26	(Venezuela)	FW	Robert Hernández	3	0	1	0	1	0	5	0
29	(Brazil)	FW	Maicon Santos	1	1	0	0	0	0	1	1
33	(United States)	FW	Zak Boggs	1	0	0	0	0	0	1	0
44	(United States)	DF	Gale Agbossoumonde	1	0	1	0	0	0	2	0
			TOTALS	27	4	8	0	2	0	37	4
