= Justin Chavez =

American soccer player

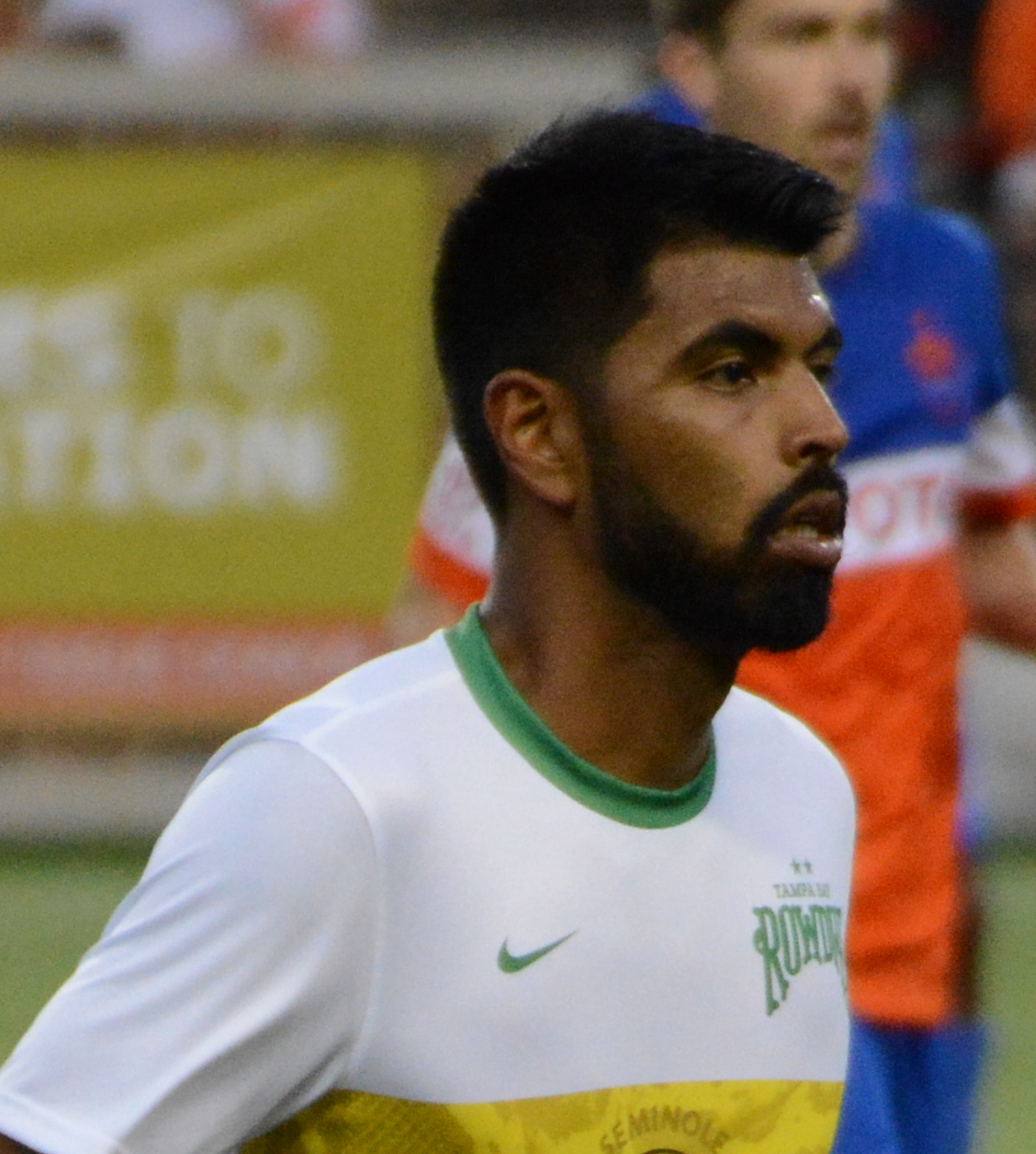
- Chavez playing for Tampa Bay Rowdies in 2017

Personal information
- Date of birth: March 23, 1990 (age 36)
- Place of birth: Oklahoma City, Oklahoma, United States
- Height: 1.79 m (5 ft 10 1/2 in)
- Positions: Defender; midfielder

College career
| Years | Team | Apps | (Gls) |
| 2008–2011 | Tulsa Golden Hurricane | 77 | (5) |

Senior career*
| Years | Team | Apps | (Gls) |
| 2013–2014 | Fort Lauderdale Strikers | 27 | (0) |
| 2015–2017 | Tampa Bay Rowdies | 53 | (1) |
| 2018 | Oklahoma City Energy | 28 | (0) |
- * Club domestic league appearances and goals as of October 3, 2018

Justin Chavez (born March 23, 1990) is an American professional soccer player.

== Career ==
=== College and youth ===
Born in Oklahoma City, Oklahoma, Chavez attended Edmond Memorial High School and later attended the University of Tulsa, where he spent four seasons playing with the soccer side, the Tulsa Golden Hurricane. Chavez then entered the 2012 MLS Supplemental Draft where he was drafted by the Chicago Fire, however, he was never given a contract with the team.

=== Fort Lauderdale Strikers ===
On March 25, 2013, it was announced that Chavez had signed his first professional contract with the Fort Lauderdale Strikers of the North American Soccer League. He then made his debut for the Strikers on May 18 against the San Antonio Scorpions in which he came off the bench in the 78th minute for Shavar Thomas as the Strikers lost the match 1–3.

== Career statistics ==
As of October 3, 2018

| Club | Season | League | | | Playoffs | | Cup | | Continental | | Total | |
| Club | Season | Division | Apps | Goals | Apps | Goals | Apps | Goals | Apps | Goals | Apps | Goals |
|---|---|---|---|---|---|---|---|---|---|---|---|---|
| Fort Lauderdale Strikers | 2013 | NASL | 13 | 0 | – | | 0 | 0 | – | | 13 | 0 |
| Fort Lauderdale Strikers | 2014 | NASL | 14 | 0 | 0 | 0 | 0 | 0 | – | | 14 | 0 |
| Fort Lauderdale Strikers | Total | | 27 | 0 | 0 | 0 | 0 | 0 | 0 | 0 | 27 | 0 |
| Tampa Bay Rowdies | 2015 | NASL | 15 | 0 | – | | 0 | 0 | – | | 15 | 0 |
| Tampa Bay Rowdies | 2016 | NASL | 22 | 1 | – | | 2 | 0 | – | | 24 | 1 |
| Tampa Bay Rowdies | 2017 | USL | 16 | 0 | 1 | 0 | 1 | 0 | – | | 18 | 0 |
| Tampa Bay Rowdies | Total | | 53 | 1 | 1 | 0 | 3 | 0 | 0 | 0 | 57 | 1 |
| OKC Energy | 2018 | USL | 28 | 0 | – | | 1 | 0 | – | | 29 | 0 |
| Career total | | | 108 | 1 | 1 | 0 | 4 | 0 | 0 | 0 | 113 | 1 |
