= Ben Sweat =

American professional soccer player (born 1991)

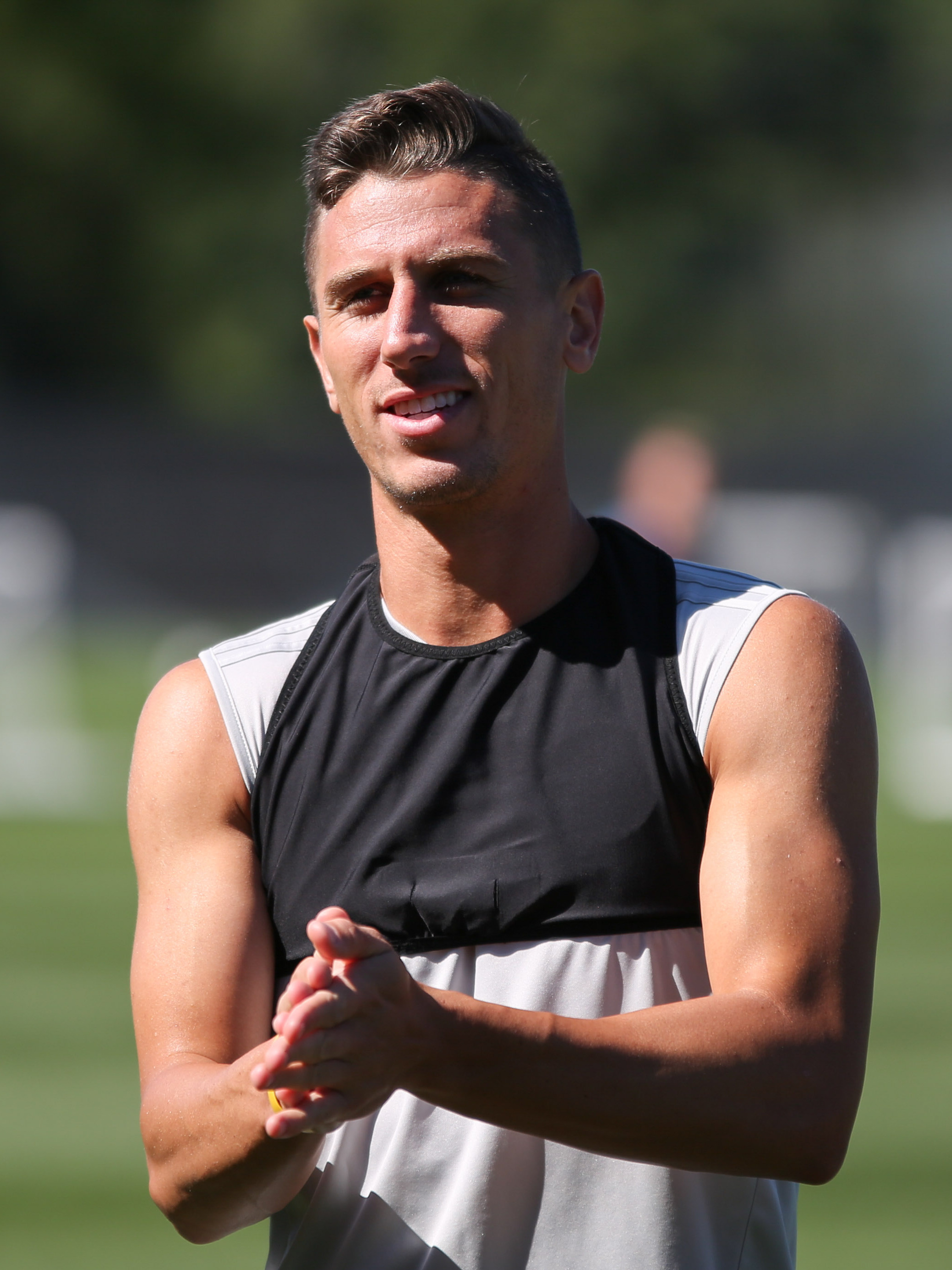
- Sweat training with New York City FC in 2017

Personal information
- Full name: Benjamin Sweat
- Date of birth: September 4, 1991 (age 35)
- Place of birth: Palm Harbor, Florida, U.S.
- Height: 6 ft 2 in (1.88 m)
- Position: Left-back

College career
Years	Team	Apps	(Gls)
2010–2013	South Florida Bulls	78	(3)

Senior career*
Years	Team	Apps	(Gls)
2012	VSI Tampa Flames	13	(0)
2013	Reading United	8	(1)
2014	Columbus Crew	0	(0)
2014	→ Dayton Dutch Lions (loan)	7	(0)
2015–2016	Tampa Bay Rowdies	36	(0)
2017–2019	New York City FC	81	(1)
2020	Inter Miami	23	(0)
2021	Austin FC	2	(0)
2022–2023	Sporting Kansas City	29	(0)
2023	New England Revolution	15	(0)
Total		215	(2)

International career^{‡}
2010	United States U20	1	(0)
2018	United States	2	(0)
- * Club domestic league appearances and goals as of November 6, 2023 ‡ National team caps and goals as of October 16, 2018

Benjamin Sweat (born September 4, 1991) is an American former professional soccer player who played as a left-back.

== Career ==
=== Youth and college ===
Sweat played soccer at Palm Harbor University High School and then went on to play college soccer at the University of South Florida between 2010 and 2013. Sweat still holds the record for most appearances in matches at South Florida. While at college, Sweat also appeared for USL PDL clubs VSI Tampa Bay and Reading United AC.

=== Professional ===
Sweat has earned experience while training with Swedish top flight club Djurgårdens IF Fotboll (2012 & 2013 summer). He also spent a summer in Czech Republic with SK Sigma Olomouc (2013 summer).

On January 16, 2014, Sweat was drafted in the first round (14th overall) of the 2014 MLS SuperDraft by Columbus Crew.

Sweat was loaned out to Columbus Crew's USL Pro affiliate club Dayton Dutch Lions in May 2014 for a few matches. Sweat was given his first professional start on June 25, 2014, in the 5th round of the US Open Cup against Chicago Fire. He also played a half against English Premier league side Crystal Palace F.C. on July 23, 2014.

After being with the first team inconsistently, Columbus Crew SC announced on February 9, 2015, that they had waived Sweat.

After being waived by Columbus, Sweat signed with NASL club Tampa Bay Rowdies on March 2, 2015. He spent the 2015 and 2016 seasons with Tampa Bay, making 33 regular season appearances for the club before leaving at the conclusion of the 2016 season.

Sweat trialed with New York City FC during their 2017 pre-season, and was signed by the club on February 23, 2017.

He signed a multi-year contract extension with New York City FC at the end of the 2017 season after being labeled one of the top fullbacks in the league that season.

On November 19, 2019, Sweat was selected by Inter Miami in the 2019 MLS Expansion Draft.

On December 13, 2020, Sweat was traded to Austin FC ahead of their inaugural season. Following the 2021 season, Sweat's contract option was declined by Austin.

On April 5, 2023, Sporting Kansas City announced that Ben Sweat was being waived. This allows Sweat to become a free agent and sign freely with any club in MLS.

On April 18, 2023, the New England Revolution announced they had signed Sweat through the 2023 season, with an option for 2024. The Revolution announced on December 1, 2023, that they would not exercise Sweat's 2024 option.

On March 21, 2024, Sweat announced his retirement from professional soccer.

=== International ===
Sweat was called up for the USMNT for the first time in October 2018. He played in 2 games, against Colombia and Peru.

=== Career statistics ===
As of November 21, 2020

Club	Season	League			Playoffs (Note: Appearances in the PDL Playoffs and MLS Cup Playoffs)		Cup		Continental		Total	
Club	Season	Division	Apps	Goals	Apps	Goals	Apps	Goals	Apps	Goals	Apps	Goals
VSI Tampa Flames	2012	PDL	13	0	–		–		–		13	0
Reading United	2013	PDL	8	1	2	0	3	0	–		13	1
Columbus Crew	2014	MLS	0	0	0	0	1	0	–		1	0
Dayton Dutch Lions (loan)	2014	USL Pro	7	0	–		0	0	–		7	0
Tampa Bay Rowdies	2015	NASL	26	0	–		1	0	–		27	0
Tampa Bay Rowdies	2016	NASL	7	0	–		2	0	–		9	0
Tampa Bay Rowdies	Total		33	0	0	0	3	0	0	0	36	0
New York City FC	2017	MLS	26	1	2	0	1	0	–		29	1
New York City FC	2018	MLS	28	0	3	0	1	0	–		32	0
New York City FC	2019	MLS	18	0	0	0	2	0	–		20	0
New York City FC	Total		72	1	5	0	4	0	0	0	81	1
Inter Miami	2020	MLS	22	0	1	0	–		–		23	0
Austin FC	2021	MLS	2	0	0	0	0	0	–		2	0
Career total			157	2	8	0	11	0	0	0	176	2
