= Darwin Espinal =

Honduran footballer (born 1995)

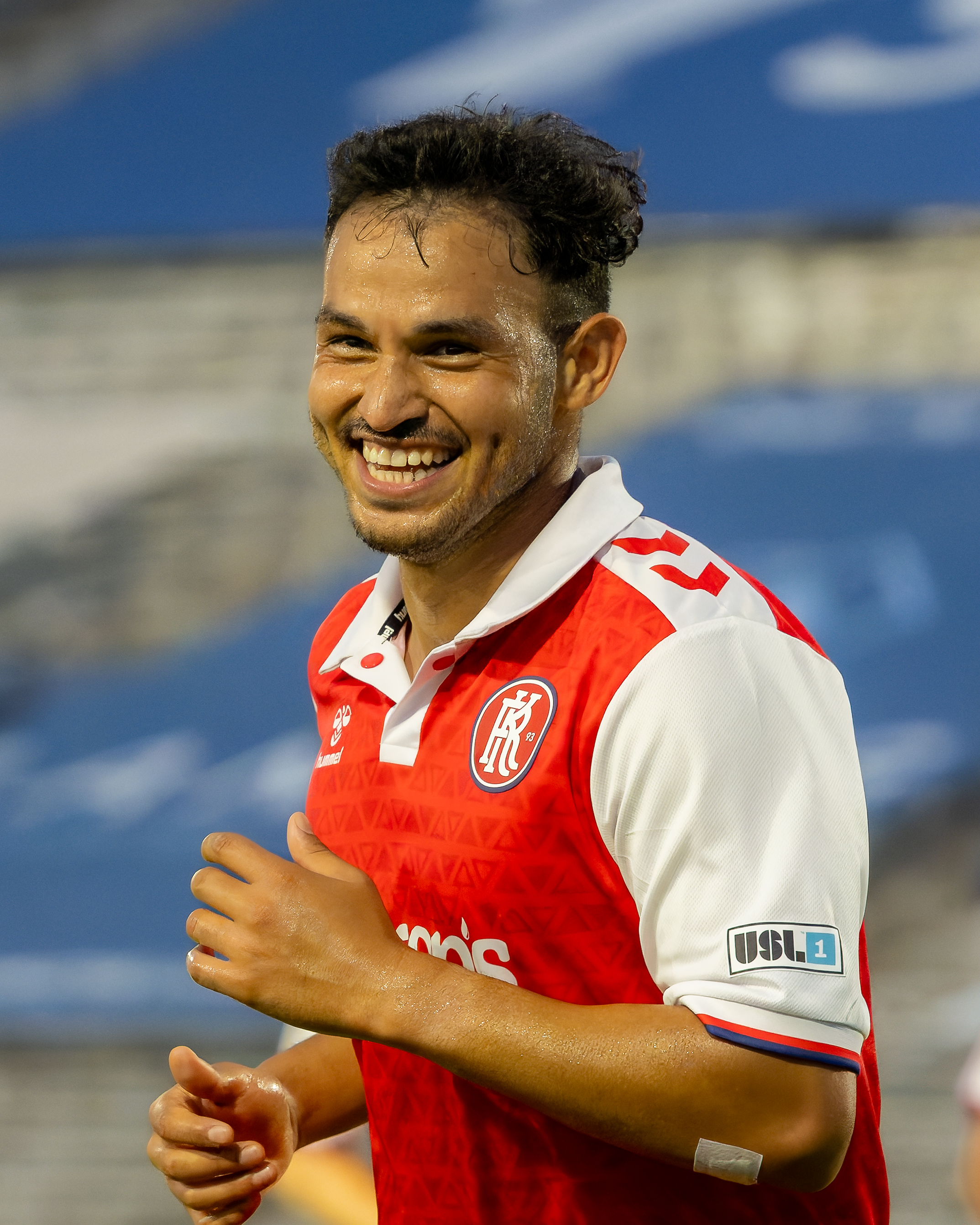
- Espinal with the Richmond Kickers in 2026

Personal information
- Date of birth: 16 January 1995 (age 31)
- Place of birth: Tegucigalpa, Honduras
- Height: 1.80 m (5 ft 11 in)
- Positions: Forward; midfielder

Team information
- Current team: Richmond Kickers
- Number: 19

Youth career
- Plantation FC

College career
| Years | Team | Apps | (Gls) |
| 2013–2014 | Darton Cavaliers | 35 | (52) |

Senior career*
| Years | Team | Apps | (Gls) |
| 2015–2016 | Tampa Bay Rowdies | 25 | (4) |
| 2016 | Tampa Bay Rowdies 2 | 2 | (1) |
| 2017 | South Florida Surf | 2 | (0) |
| 2017–2018 | Reno 1868 | 13 | (2) |
| 2018–2019 | New York Cosmos B | 16 | (9) |
| 2020 | New York Cosmos | 5 | (0) |
| 2020 | → Oakland Roots (loan) | 0 | (0) |
| 2020 | → Detroit City (loan) | 0 | (0) |
| 2021 | Detroit City | 19 | (2) |
| 2022–2024 | Maryland Bobcats | 69 | (34) |
| 2025– | Richmond Kickers | 47 | (12) |

International career^{‡}
| 2015 | Honduras U23 | 5 | (0) |
- * Club domestic league appearances and goals as of 2 November 2026 ‡ National team caps and goals as of 16 December 2015

Darwin Espinal (born 16 January 1995) is a Honduran professional footballer who currently plays as a midfielder for Richmond Kickers in USL League One.

== Career ==
=== College and Youth ===
Espinal was born in Tegucigalpa, Honduras, though his family moved Washington DC, Espinal and family later moved to Broward County, Florida where he played high school soccer for J. P. Taravella High School. While at Taravella, Espinal was named the 2012–2013 Florida Class 5A-4A Player of the Year. Espinal also enjoyed success at the club level in Broward, playing for Plantation FC. Espinal led Plantation to the Florida State Cup Championship and a spot in the Region III Championship, where he was named tournament MVP.

Coming out of high school, Espinal had an offer to join the Chicago Fire SC Academy, but he opted to go to college at Albany, Georgia's Darton State College. In his freshman season as a Darton Cavalier, Espinal scored 23 goals and notched 10 assists in just 16 games. During his 2014 sophomore season, Espinal continued his impressive form, scoring 29 goals with 19 assists in 19 games. He was a 1st Team NJCAA All-American both years and helped the Cavaliers win the Region 17 Championship in 2014. His 52 goals and 81 points were both good for school records.

=== Tampa Bay Rowdies ===
On 23 December 2014 it was announced that Espinal had signed his first professional contract with the Tampa Bay Rowdies of the North American Soccer League. During the Rowdies preseason tour of Portugal ahead of their 2015 campaign, Espinal scored goals against the 'B' teams of S.L. Benfica and Sporting CP.

Espinal's strong preseason performance earned him a spot in Coach Thomas Rongen's starting eleven for the Rowdies first match of the 2015 season against the San Antonio Scorpions. Espinal cashed in on the opportunity, scoring a goal in first half stoppage time off an assist by Darnell King.

=== South Florida Surf ===
In 2017, Espinal signed on to play with the South Florida Surf of the Premier Development League. For three weeks, Espinal was listed as the PDL's top prospect.

=== Reno 1868 FC ===
On June 21, 2017, it was announced that Espinal had signed with Reno 1868 FC of the USL in a one-year deal. He scored his first goal for the team on July 3 in its historic 9–0 rout of LA Galaxy II; Espinal's 88th-minute strike, Reno's ninth of the game, set the league record for largest margin of victory. He was one of five Reno players called up by the San Jose Earthquakes, Reno's Major League Soccer affiliate, to play in its July 14 friendly against Eintracht Frankfurt, and made his first appearance for the club off the bench during the 4–1 victory in the 33rd minute for Danny Hoesen.

=== New York Cosmos ===
In April 2018, Espinal joined New York Cosmos B in the National Premier Soccer League. In February 2020, Espinal signed with the New York Cosmos first team as they came out of hiatus to compete in the National Independent Soccer Association. He was initially sent on loan to the Oakland Roots for the Spring season of NISA. In the beginning of March, Espinal's loan was transferred to Detroit City FC, though he was recalled to the Cosmos before appearing for Detroit as a result of the COVID-19 pandemic.

=== Detroit City FC ===
In May 2021, Espinal signed with Detroit City FC on a permanent basis.

=== Maryland Bobcats FC ===
On January 26, 2022, NISA side Maryland Bobcats announced that they had signed Espinal. Espinal proved to be a prolific goalscorer for the Bobcats, winning the league Golden Ball Award for most valuable player in 2023, Golden Boot Award for top goalscorer in 2024. Espinal ended his tenure in NISA as the league's all-time leading scorer.

=== Richmond Kickers ===
==== 2025 ====
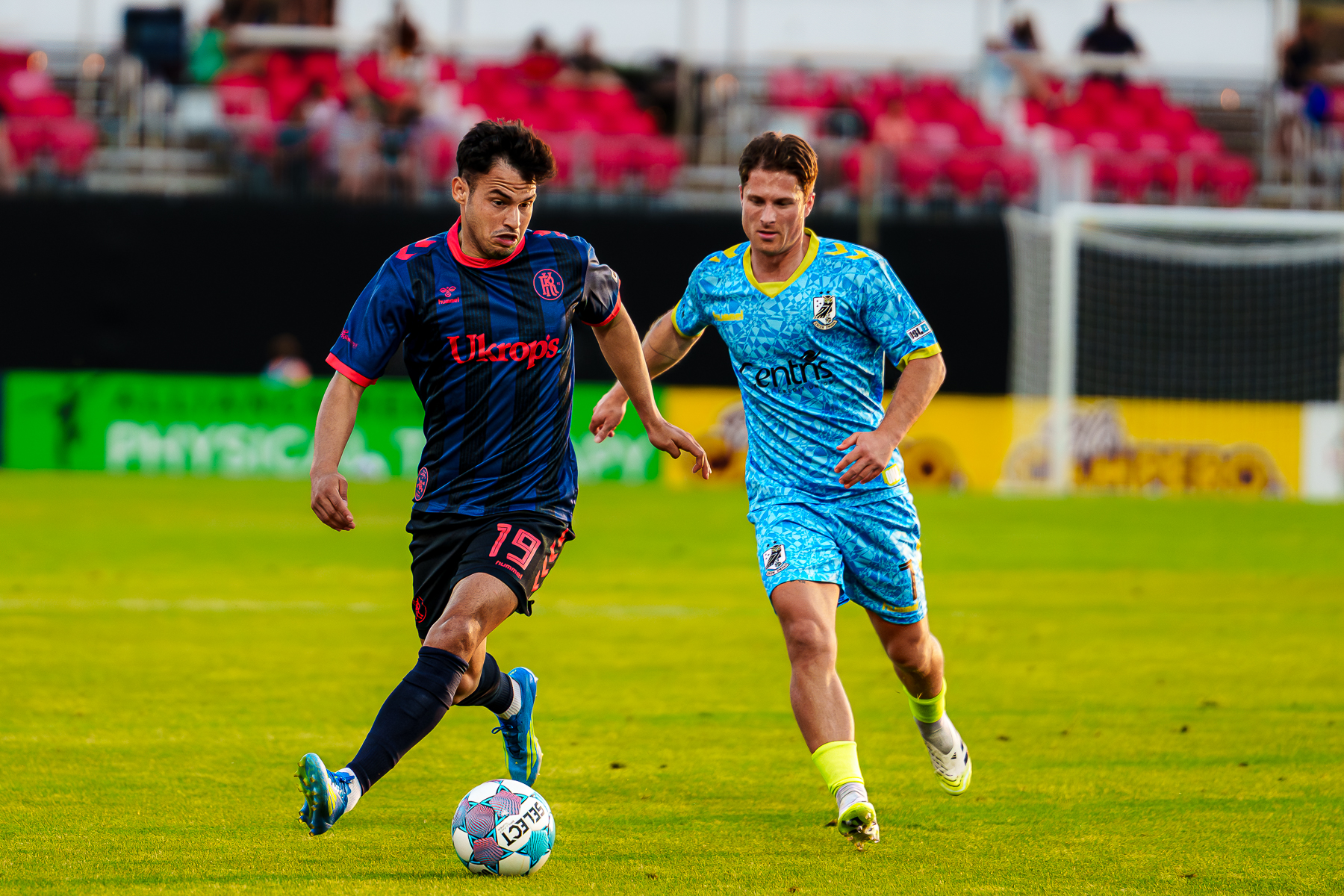
Espinal playing against former Richmond Kickers teammate Adrian Billhardt in a game against Union Omaha

In January 2025, Espinal joined the Richmond Kickers of USL League One on a two-year contract. On 7 March, he would make his debut, and would start in his first game in a 4–2 win against South Georgia Tormenta. He would get his first goal in a 1–2 loss against Forward Madison. He would score the only goal in the home game against Union Omaha on April 9.

On 12 April, he would score again in a 2–1 loss against expansion club, FC Naples. On 19 April, he got his first brace in a 4–4 draw against Westchester SC, another expansion team that year. In his debut season, he made 26 appearances and was top goalscorer with nine goals.

==== 2026 ====
On 21 March 2026, he made his first appearance for the 2026 season coming in as a substitute in a 1–0 loss against FC Naples. He would make his first start of the season in a 1–0 victory over Loudoun United in the U.S. Open Cup. On 18 April, he would score his first goal of the season in a 2–1 victory against Union Omaha.

== International career ==
Espinal was called up to represent Honduras for the 2015 CONCACAF Men's Olympic Qualifying Championship in the United States.

== Personal life ==
Darwin's younger brother, Isaac is also a professional footballer, and recently played for Loudoun United FC in USL Championship.
