= Gale Agbossoumonde =

American soccer player

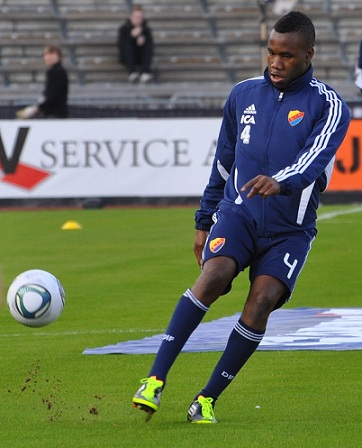

Personal information
- Full name: Gale Agbossoumonde
- Date of birth: November 17, 1991 (age 35)
- Place of birth: Lome, Togo
- Height: 6 ft 2 in (1.88 m)
- Position: Defender

Youth career
- 200?–2007: Syracuse Blitz

Senior career*
Years	Team	Apps	(Gls)
2009–2010	Miami FC	6	(0)
2010	→ Braga (loan)	0	(0)
2010–2012	Estoril	0	(0)
2011	→ Djurgården (loan)	8	(0)
2011–2012	→ Eintracht Frankfurt II (loan)	1	(0)
2012	→ Carolina RailHawks (loan)	17	(1)
2013–2014	Toronto FC	13	(0)
2014	Colorado Rapids	0	(0)
2015	Tampa Bay Rowdies	11	(0)
2016	Fort Lauderdale Strikers	29	(1)
2017	Pittsburgh Riverhounds	11	(0)
Total		96	(2)

International career
2009	United States U18	3	(1)
2008–2011	United States U20	30	(2)
2010	United States	1	(0)
Medal record
Representing United States
Runner-up	CONCACAF U-20 Championship	2009
- * Club domestic league appearances and goals

Gale Agbossoumonde (born November 17, 1991) is a retired soccer player who played as a defender. Born in Togo but was raised in Benin (and later the United States), he represented the United States at international level.

== Early life ==
Agbossoumonde was born in Togo, but his family fled to Benin when he was an infant. At the age of eight, his family moved to Syracuse, New York with the help of a church charity. Agbossoumonde attended Christian Brothers Academy until the 9th grade, leading them to a NYS Soccer Championship runner-up finish that year.

== Club career ==
After a semester with the U17 national team, Agbossoumonde was invited to join U.S. Soccer Development Academy club IMG Academy in Bradenton, Florida. He emerged as a force at centerback, earning high praise for his soccer IQ and his ability to effectively use his already large frame.

Agbossoumonde signed a three-and-a-half-year contract with Traffic Sports Marketing and Miami FC on August 6, 2009. His professional debut shortly followed and he made six appearances during the 2009 USL season. On January 7, 2010, he moved to Sporting Braga of the Portuguese Liga on a six-month loan that included an option to buy. Braga declined the purchase option when the loan spell ended.

Agbossoumonde was sent on loan to Allsvenskan team Djurgårdens IF in 2011. On April 15 he started his first match and went the full 90 minutes for Djurgårdens IF, against Malmö FF, having won "Man of the Match" honors. Agbossoumonde played eight games for Djurgårdens IF during spring 2011, but Djurgården decided not to use their option to buy him out of his contract, and Agbossoumonde left the club at the end of July 2011.

In August 2011, Agbossoumonde was loaned to 2. Bundesliga side Eintracht Frankfurt. Gale received official clearance to play for Eintracht in the beginning of October 2011, and made his debut for the Eintracht reserve squad in a match on October 8 against SGS Großaspach. However, the loan to the German side proved short, too.

In February 2012, Traffic Sports announced that Agbossoumonde was going on loan to Carolina RailHawks of the North American Soccer League.

In December 2012, Agbossoumonde joined Toronto FC, after he was entered into a weighted lottery to allocate him to a team in Major League Soccer. Agbossoumonde made his debut for Toronto on April 6 due to an injury to starter Danny Califf, the game ended in a 2–2 home draw to FC Dallas.

On May 8, 2014, Agbossoumonde was involved in a three-team trade when the Colorado Rapids traded Marvin Chávez to Chivas USA for Luke Moore, who was immediately traded by Colorado to Toronto FC for Agbossoumonde. At the conclusion of the 2014 season, Colorado declined Agbossoumonde's contract option for 2015.

Agbossoumonde signed with Tampa Bay Rowdies of the North American Soccer League in December 2014. He was released in October 2015.

In December 2015, Agbossoumonde signed with Fort Lauderdale Strikers of the NASL. In 2017 he signed for Pittsburgh Riverhounds. His contract was not renewed following the 2017 USL season, and has since not played professionally.

== International career ==
Agbossoumonde was a member of the United States U-20 team and participated in the 2009 CONCACAF U-20 Championship in Trinidad and Tobago, helping the U.S. to qualify for the 2009 FIFA U-20 World Cup in Egypt. In the tournament in Egypt, although only 17 at the time, he started all games for the Americans.

Agbossoumonde received his first senior national team cap on his birthday, November 17, 2010, against South Africa in the Nelson Mandela Challenge Cup.

== Career statistics ==
=== Club ===
Appearances and goals by club, season and competition
Club	Season	League			National Cup (Note: Includes the Svenska Cupen and U.S. Open Cup)		League Cup		Continental		Other		Total	
Club	Season	Division	Apps	Goals	Apps	Goals	Apps	Goals	Apps	Goals	Apps	Goals	Apps	Goals
Miami FC	2009	USL-1	6	0	0	0	—		—		—		6	0
Miami FC	2010	D2 Pro League	0	0	0	0	—		—		—		0	0
Miami FC	Total		6	0	0	0	0	0	0	0	0	0	6	0
Braga (loan)	2009–10	Primeira Liga	0	0	0	0	0	0	0	0	—		0	0
Estoril	2010–11	Liga de Honra	0	0	0	0	0	0	—		—		0	0
Estoril	2011–12	Liga de Honra	0	0	0	0	0	0	—		—		0	0
Estoril	2012–13	Primeira Liga	0	0	0	0	0	0	—		—		0	0
Estoril	Total		0	0	0	0	0	0	0	0	0	0	0	0
Djurgården (loan)	2011	Allsvenskan	8	0	2	0	—		—		—		10	0
Eintracht Frankfurt II (loan)	2011–12	Regionalliga Süd	1	0	—		—		—		—		1	0
Carolina RailHawks (loan)	2012	NASL	17	1	2	0	—		—		1 (Note: Appearance in the NASL Playoffs)	0	20	1
Toronto FC	2013	MLS	13	0	0	0	—		—		—		13	0
Toronto FC	2014	MLS	0	0	0	0	—		—		—		0	0
Toronto FC	Total		13	0	0	0	0	0	0	0	0	0	13	0
Colorado Rapids	2014	MLS	0	0	0	0	—		—		—		0	0
Tampa Bay Rowdies	2015	NASL	11	0	0	0	—		—		—		11	0
Fort Lauderdale Strikers	2016	NASL	29	1	4	0	—		—		—		33	1
Pittsburgh Riverhounds	2017	USL	11	0	0	0	—		—		—		11	0
Career statistics			96	2	8	0	0	0	0	0	1	0	105	2

=== International ===
Appearances and goals by national team and year
National team	Year	Apps	Goals
United States	2010	1	0
Total		1	0

== Honors ==
United States U20

- Milk Cup: 2010

Individual

- U.S. Soccer Young Male Player of the Year: 2010
