= Carlos Preciado =

Colombian footballer (born 1985)

Personal information
- Date of birth: 30 March 1985 (age 41)
- Place of birth: Cali, Colombia
- Height: 1.73 m (5 ft 8 in)
- Position: Forward

Team information
- Current team: Carlos Stein
- Number: 19

Senior career*
Years	Team	Apps	(Gls)
2002–2008	América de Cali	77	(8)
2005	→ Real Cartagena (loan)	38	(6)
2009	Deportivo Pereira	36	(8)
2010	América de Cali	28	(1)
2011	Millonarios	43	(3)
2012	Deportes Tolima	37	(4)
2013	Envigado	22	(1)
2014	León de Huánuco	30	(15)
2015	Alianza Lima	40	(8)
2016	Al-Sailiya SC	10	(4)
2016	Tampa Bay Rowdies	18	(0)
2017	Sport Huancayo	26	(9)
2018	Al-Shamal	10	(4)
2018	Unión Comercio	18	(4)
2019	Ayacucho	30	(5)
2020–	Carlos Stein	6	(0)
- * Club domestic league appearances and goals as of 01:09, 8 October 2019 (UTC)

Carlos Alberto Preciado Benítez (born 30 March 1985) is a Colombian professional soccer player who currently plays as a forward for FC Carlos Stein.

== Professional career ==
Preciado began his career with his hometown club América de Cali. During his time with América, Preciado made appearances for both the first team and the reserve squad. In 2005, Preciado was loaned to lower division team Real Cartagena. He was released by América after the 2008 season and joined Deportivo Pereira. After impressing with Deportivo Pereira, Preciado rejoined América but was released again after one season. From 2011 to 2013, spent a season each with Colombian clubs Millonarios F.C., Deportes Tolima, and Envigado F.C.

In 2014, Preciado joined his first non-Colombian team, Peru's León de Huánuco. Preciado performed well in Huánuco and the following season he was brought on by Alianza Lima.

On January 7, 2016, Preciado joined Qatari club Al-Sailiya SC. He made his debut on January 27, playing 87 minutes in a 3–1 victory over Al-Mesaimeer. Preciado's first two goals for ASSC came on February 13, during a 2–3 loss to Al-Wakrah.

After just 10 games in the Qatari Stars League, Preciado transferred to the North American Soccer League's Tampa Bay Rowdies on July 19, 2016.
