= Verneri Välimaa =

Finnish-American footballer (born 1993)

Personal information
- Date of birth: 19 January 1993 (age 33)
- Place of birth: Helsinki, Finland
- Height: 1.70 m (5 ft 7 in)
- Position: Midfielder

Youth career
- Weston FC

College career
Years	Team	Apps	(Gls)
2011	George Mason Patriots	18	(2)
2012–2014	North Carolina Tar Heels	56	(6)

Senior career*
Years	Team	Apps	(Gls)
2013	Fort Lauderdale Schulz Academy	4	(1)
2013	Ocala Stampede	7	(1)
2015–2016	Tampa Bay Rowdies	4	(0)
2016	→ Orange County Blues (loan)	22	(0)
2017	JJK	4	(0)
2017	→ Villiketut (loan)	2	(0)
2018	Colorado Springs Switchbacks	6	(0)
2018–2019	SC Liezen	14	(1)
2019	DSV Leoben	0	(0)

International career^{‡}
- United States U-18
- Finland U-20
- * Club domestic league appearances and goals as of 8 May 2020 ‡ National team caps and goals as of 13 April 2015

Verneri Välimaa (born 19 January 1993) is a Finnish and American professional soccer player who last played as a midfielder for DSV Leoben.

== Career ==
=== College and Youth ===
Välimaa was born in Helsinki, Finland, and moved to Coral Springs, Florida at the age of five. In 2010, Välimaa helped Delray Beach American Heritage School to Florida's Class 2A State Championship by scoring 32 goals and distributing 18 assists. In 2011, Välimaa was named Gatorade Florida Boys Soccer Player of the Year 2010–2011, the Sun-Sentinel Player of the Year and an ESPN Rise All-American.

Välimaa began his collegiate career at George Mason University, starting all 18 games for the Patriots and tallying 2 goals and 9 assists. For his sophomore, junior and senior seasons, Välimaa played for the University of North Carolina. He appeared in 56 games for the Tar Heels and was awarded Atlantic Coast Conference Academic honors in his sophomore and junior years.

=== Tampa Bay Rowdies ===
On 30 March 2015 it was announced that Välimaa had signed his first professional contract with the Tampa Bay Rowdies of the North American Soccer League. Välimaa initially joined the Rowdies as a trialist on 18 March, seeing time against the University of Tampa. He also played against the USF Bulls - where he made an impact by playing in a dangerous cross that led to a USF own goal - and in the preseason finale against Jacksonville Armada FC.

Välimaa's first regular season minutes as a professional footballer came during the Rowdies' April 11 home opener vs. Minnesota United FC. He came on as a substitute in the 76th minute for team captain Marcelo Saragosa.

=== Orange County Blues FC ===
On 24 March 2016, the Rowdies announced they were sending Välimaa to the USL's Orange County Blues FC on a season-long loan.

=== Colorado Springs Switchbacks FC ===
On 25 January 2018, Välimaa joined the Colorado Springs Switchbacks FC of the United Soccer League.
