= Marcelo Saragosa =

Brazilian footballer

Personal information
- Full name: Marcelo Saragosa
- Date of birth: 22 January 1982 (age 44)
- Place of birth: Campo Grande, Brazil
- Height: 6 ft 0 in (1.83 m)
- Position: Defensive midfielder

Youth career
- –2003: São Paulo

Senior career*
Years	Team	Apps	(Gls)
2003–2005	São Paulo	3	(0)
2004	→ Los Angeles Galaxy (loan)	26	(0)
2005–2006	Los Angeles Galaxy	14	(1)
2006–2009	FC Dallas	54	(1)
2009–2010	Chivas USA	22	(0)
2012–2013	D.C. United	24	(1)
2015	Tampa Bay Rowdies	17	(0)
2019	Austin Bold	0	(0)
Total		160	(3)
- * Club domestic league appearances and goals as of August 3, 2018

Marcelo Saragosa (born 22 January 1982) is a Brazilian former professional footballer who played as a midfielder.

== Career ==
=== Professional ===
Born in Campo Grande, Saragosa began his career with Brazilian team São Paulo, having signed with their youth team at the age of 13. He was sent on loan to the Los Angeles Galaxy of Major League Soccer in 2004 where he started in 24 of 26 games for the Galaxy. He then returned to São Paulo, before being signed to a permanent deal by the Galaxy in August 2005.

After starting in 10 of the first 15 games of the 2006 season for the Galaxy, Saragosa was traded to FC Dallas on July 19, 2006, in exchange for a fourth round supplemental draft pick in 2007. 2007 was a season riddled with injuries; he suffered a sprained right medial collateral ligament on April 14, 2007, which kept him out four weeks and appeared in only 13 games for FC Dallas before having surgery to repair a torn meniscus on September 25, 2007.

In 2008, Saragosa appeared in 25 games for FC Dallas and scored the second goal of his MLS career on October 18, 2008, in a 3–1 loss versus Real Salt Lake. Shortly before the last game of the regular season, Saragosa had surgery to repair a torn meniscus in his right knee on October 21, 2008. Saragosa was traded to Chivas USA in exchange for Atiba Harris on July 17, 2009. While with Chivas Saragosa appeared in 22 league matches.

After the 2010 MLS season Chivas USA declined Saragosa's contract option and Saragosa elected to participate in the 2010 MLS Re-Entry Draft. Saragosa became a free agent in Major League Soccer when he was not selected in the Re-Entry draft. In November 2010, Saragosa's blog announced he was suffering from cancer.

On February 16, 2012, it was announced that Saragosa had returned to Major League Soccer signing with D.C. United. Saragosa's club option declined following the 2013 season.

After taking 2014 off, Saragosa signed with North American Soccer League side Tampa Bay Rowdies on February 3, 2015. During an April 1 season kickoff event at the Mahaffey Theater, Saragosa was named captain of the 2015 Rowdies. Saragosa was released by Tampa Bay in November 2015.

On April 18, 2019, Austin Bold FC announced that Saragosa would be moving from his role as player to be the club's Director of Soccer Operations.

== Career statistics ==
As of match played 31 October 2015

Appearances and goals by club, season and competition
Club	Season	League			National Cup		Continental		Other		Total	
Club	Season	Division	Apps	Goals	Apps	Goals	Apps	Goals	Apps	Goals	Apps	Goals
LA Galaxy (loan)	2004	MLS	26	0			–		3	0	26	0
LA Galaxy	2005	MLS	4	1			–		2	0	6	1
LA Galaxy	2006	MLS	10	0			–		–		10	0
LA Galaxy	Total		14	1			-	-	12	0	16	1
FC Dallas	2006	MLS	7	0			–		2	0	9	0
FC Dallas	2007	MLS	13	0			–		–		13	0
FC Dallas	2008	MLS	25	1			–		–		25	1
FC Dallas	2009	MLS	9	0	0	0	–		–		9	0
FC Dallas	Total		54	1			-	-	2	0	56	1
Chivas USA	2009	MLS	8	0	0	0	–		1	0	9	0
Chivas USA	2010	MLS	14	0	3	0	–		–		17	0
Chivas USA	Total		22	0	3	0	-	-	1	0	26	0
D.C. United	2012	MLS	16	1	2	1	–		4	0	22	2
D.C. United	2013	MLS	8	0	0	0	–		–		8	0
D.C. United	Total		24	1	2	1	-	-	-	-	30	2
Tampa Bay Rowdies	2015	NASL	17	0	1	0	–		–		18	0
Career total			157	3			-	-	12	0	169	3

== Personal life ==
Saragosa's best friend is fellow Brazilian legend Kaká. They each served as best man at the other's wedding.

Marcelo Silveira Saragosa, 43, was arrested in Greenbrier County, West Virginia on June 20, 2025. He is charged with one count of sexual abuse first degree, forcible compulsion, and one count of abduction of person for illicit purpose.

== Honours ==
=== Club ===
LA Galaxy

- Lamar Hunt U.S. Open Cup: 2005
- Major League Soccer MLS Cup: 2005
- Major League Soccer Western Conference Championship: 2005

Lamar Hunt U.S. Open Cup: 2013 DC United
