= Robert Hernández =

Venezuelan footballer (born 1993)

Personal information
- Full name: Robert Enrique Hernández Aguado
- Date of birth: 14 September 1993 (age 33)
- Place of birth: Caracas, Venezuela
- Height: 1.69 m (5 ft 7 in)
- Positions: Midfielder; forward

Team information
- Current team: Caracas

Youth career
- Deportivo Anzoátegui

Senior career*
Years	Team	Apps	(Gls)
2011–2014	Deportivo Anzoátegui	98	(7)
2015	Tampa Bay Rowdies	15	(1)
2016–2020	Caracas FC	173	(33)
2021	Always Ready	6	(2)
2022	Deportivo Táchira	24	(2)
2023	Paysandu	7	(1)
2023	Amazonas Fc	0	(0)
2023-2025	Carabobo	63	(5)
2026-	Caracas	1	(0)

International career
2012–2013	Venezuela U20	4	(0)
- * Club domestic league appearances and goals as of 17:43, 17 June 2021 (UTC)

Robert Enrique Hernández Aguado (born 14 September 1993 in Caracas) is a Venezuelan professional footballer who plays as a midfielder for Caracas.

On 29 January 2015, the Rowdies announced Hernández and Georgi Hristov would be switching positions to work better under head coach Thomas Rongen's new system.

On 16 December 2015, it was announced that the Rowdies had declined Hernández's contract option. Hernández subsequently joined Caracas FC in his hometown.
