= Stefan Antonijevic =

Serbian footballer

Personal information
- Full name: Stefan Zelimir Antonijevic
- Date of birth: 24 January 1989 (age 37)
- Place of birth: Buffalo Grove, Illinois, United States
- Height: 6 ft 6 in (1.98 m)
- Position: Defender

Youth career
- 2008: Chicago Fire

College career
Years	Team	Apps	(Gls)
2007	Marquette Golden Eagles	16	(1)
2009–2011	Valparaiso Crusaders	54	(8)

Senior career*
Years	Team	Apps	(Gls)
2012	Vermont Voltage	13	(1)
2013–2014	Fort Lauderdale Strikers	39	(0)
2015–2016	Tampa Bay Rowdies	21	(1)
2017–2018	Lillestrøm	29	(0)
2019–2020	Sogndal	18	(1)
2020	Øygarden	11	(0)

International career
2008	Serbia U19	2	(0)
- * Club domestic league appearances and goals as of 7 November 2023

Stefan Zelimir Antonijevic (born 24 January 1989) is a professional footballer who plays for Øygarden. He previously played for Lillestrøm and Sogndal also in the Norwegian Eliteserien. Born in the United States, he represented Serbia at youth level.

== Career ==
=== Youth and college ===
Antonijevic began his college soccer career at Marquette University in 2007, before transferring to Valparaiso University in 2009. In 2008, Antonijevic played for the Chicago Fire SC youth team that won the national USL Super-20 championship.

=== Professional ===
On 17 January 2012 Antonijevic was selected by Sporting Kansas City in the 3rd round (No. 43 overall) of the 2012 MLS Supplemental Draft.

After trialling in Serbia and Croatia, Antonijevic returned to the United States and signed for NASL club Fort Lauderdale Strikers on 27 March 2013.

Antonijevic moved to rival Florida club Tampa Bay Rowdies on 7 January 2015. Antonijevic played 1,823 minutes in 21 games for the Rowdies in 2015 and was named to the NASL Team of the Week four times, more often than any other Rowdies player. On 22 December 2015, the Rowdies signed the towering center back to a fresh contract good through the 2016 season, with an option for 2017.

On 21 January 2019, Antonijevic signed with Sogndal on a two-year contract.

== Honours ==
Lillestrøm

- Norwegian Football Cup (1): 2017
