= Marquez Fernandez =

American professional soccer player

Personal information
- Date of birth: September 7, 1992 (age 34)
- Place of birth: Baltimore, Maryland, United States
- Height: 1.72 m (5 ft 7 1/2 in)
- Position: Defensive midfielder

College career
Years	Team	Apps	(Gls)
2011–2012	Maryland Terrapins	15	(0)
2013–2014	UMBC Retrievers	41	(4)

Senior career*
Years	Team	Apps	(Gls)
2012–2014	Baltimore Bohemians	38	(6)
2015	Tampa Bay Rowdies	1	(0)
2016	Baltimore Bohemians	14	(1)

International career
- United States U-17
- * Club domestic league appearances and goals as of November 14, 2015

Marquez Fernandez (born September 7, 1992) is an American professional soccer player who plays as a midfielder.

== Career ==
=== College and Youth ===
Fernandez was raised in Baltimore, Maryland, and played four years of high school soccer for the McDonogh School in Owings Mills. In 2010, Fernandez began attending the University of Maryland, though he redshirted his true freshman year. After his redshirt, Fernandez appeared in 15 matches for the Terrapins in 2011 and 2012.

Fernandez transferred to the University of Maryland-Baltimore County before the 2013 season, where he became an integral part of the Retrievers back line. Fernandez played in 41 games (starting 40) over the 2013 and 2014 seasons with UMBC.

During his time in college, Fernandez became a defensive stalwart for local Premier Development League squad Baltimore Bohemians. Fernandez appeared in 38 matches for the amateur side during the college offseason. During the 2013 PDL season, Fernandez earned PDL Player of the Week honors for his two goals for the Bohs during a 2–2 draw with Jersey Express S.C.

=== Tampa Bay Rowdies ===
On 23 February 2015 it was announced that Fernandez had signed his first professional contract with Tampa Bay Rowdies of the North American Soccer League. Fernandez scored a goal for the Rowdies during a 5-0 closed-door scrimmage victory over the Guelph Gryphons, a Canadian college team. His first official appearance with the Rowdies was as a substitute in the closing minutes of a 2–1 win against FC Edmonton on June 6, 2015. He was released in November 2015.
