= Juan Guerra (footballer, born 1987) =

Venezuelan footballer

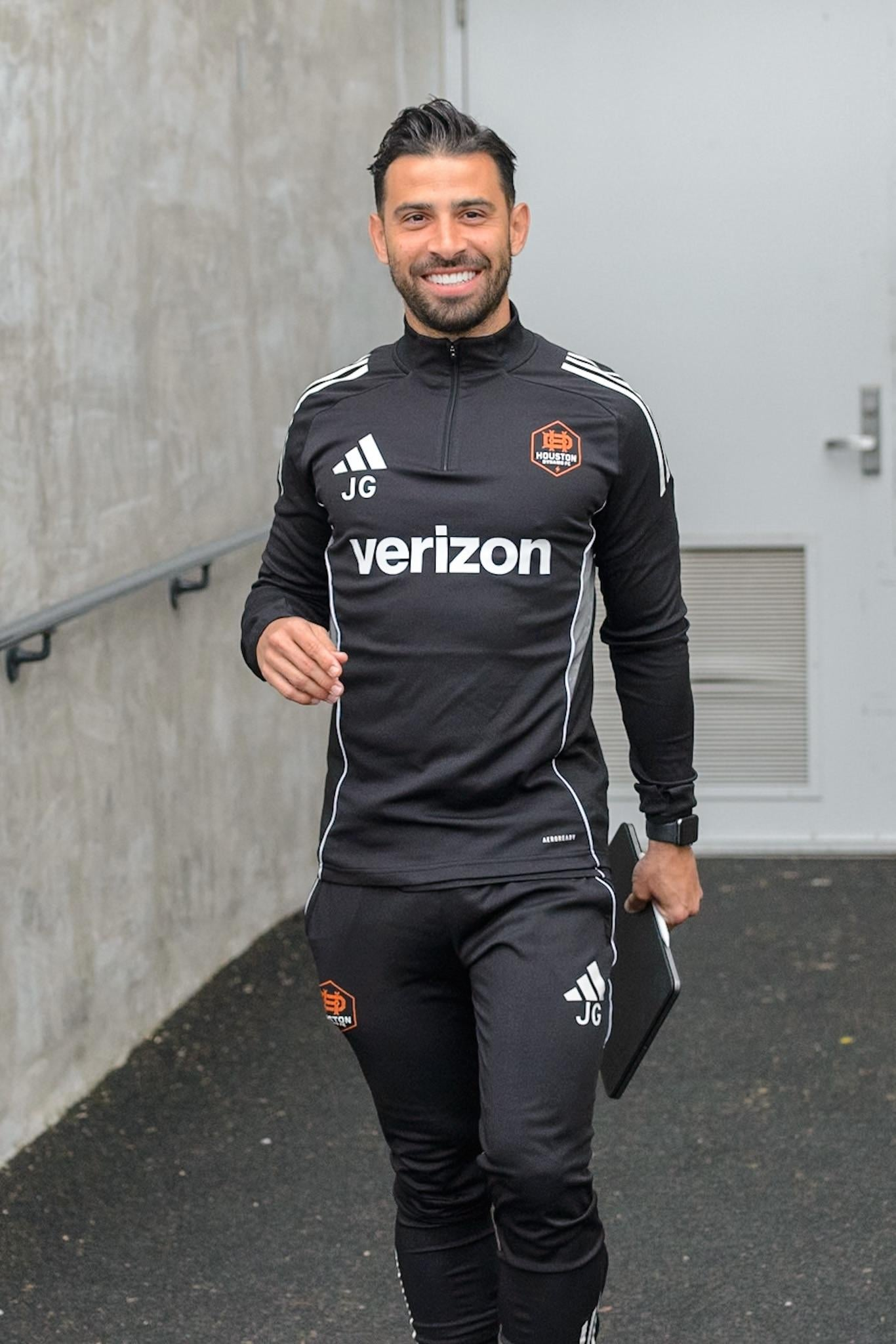
- Juan Guerra in 2025.

Personal information
- Full name: Juan Francisco Guerra Piñero
- Date of birth: 16 February 1987 (age 39)
- Place of birth: Caracas, Venezuela
- Height: 1.76 m (5 ft 9 1/2 in)
- Position: Midfielder

College career
Years	Team	Apps	(Gls)
2005–2008	FIU Golden Panthers	44	(15)

Senior career*
Years	Team	Apps	(Gls)
2008	Brooklyn Knights	15	(4)
2009–2010	Monagas	22	(2)
2010–2013	Caracas	58	(1)
2011	→ Las Palmas (loan)	0	(0)
2013–2014	Carabobo	9	(1)
2014	Deportivo Lara	10	(0)
2015–2016	Tampa Bay Rowdies	45	(3)
2017	New York Cosmos	30	(5)
2018	Indy Eleven	25	(1)
Total		214	(17)

International career
2010–2011	Venezuela U20	3	(0)
2011–2012	Venezuela	6	(0)

Managerial career
- 2019–2020: Indy Eleven (assistant)
- 2021: Phoenix Rising (assistant)
- 2022: Oakland Roots
- 2022–2023: Phoenix Rising
- 2024–: Houston Dynamo (assistant)
- * Club domestic league appearances and goals

Juan Francisco Guerra Piñero (born 16 February 1987) is a Venezuelan football coach and former player. He is currently an assistant coach for Major League Soccer club Houston Dynamo.

== Career ==
Guerra was the first signing made by the Rowdies' new general manager/head coach combo of Farrukh Quraishi and Thomas Rongen. Upon signing, coach Rongen praised Guerra's ability to read the pitch, as well as his leadership skills.

Guerra was named Oakland Roots SC's new head coach on 30 December 2021.

Following his departure from Oakland, Guerra was officially announced as the new Phoenix Rising manager on 22 August 2022. In November of 2023 Juan Guerra won The USL Championship with Phoenix Rising, becoming the youngest coach to win a USL Championship.

He left Phoenix on 8 January 2024 to take up a coaching position at an unnamed Major League Soccer side.

On 16 January 2024 Houston Dynamo officially announced Guerra as member of head coach Ben Olsen's staff.

== Managerial statistics ==
As of match played 14 October 2023

Managerial record by team and tenure
Team	Nat	From	To	Record (Note: regular season only)							
Team	Nat	From	To	G	W	D	L	GF	GA	GD	Win %
Oakland Roots	(United States)	1 January 2022	18 August 2022	25	6	12	7	38	36	+2	24.00
Phoenix Rising	(United States)	31 August 2022	Present	43	16	13	14	69	55	+14	37.21
Total				68	22	25	21	107	91	+16	32.35
