= Zac Portillos =

US association football player

Personal information
- Full name: Zachary Portillos
- Date of birth: January 19, 1992 (age 34)
- Place of birth: Aurora, Colorado, United States
- Height: 1.75 m (5 ft 9 in)
- Position: Defender

Youth career
- 2008–2010: Real Colorado

College career
Years	Team	Apps	(Gls)
2010	Washington Huskies	17	(2)
2011–2013	Akron Zips	40	(3)

Senior career*
Years	Team	Apps	(Gls)
2013	Des Moines Menace	8	(1)
2015–2018	Tampa Bay Rowdies	41	(1)
- * Club domestic league appearances and goals as of 20:28, 15 October 2018 (UTC)

Zachary Portillos (born January 19, 1992) is an American professional soccer player who plays as a defender.

== Career ==
=== College and Youth ===
Portillos was born in Aurora, Colorado, where he enjoyed a highly decorated high school career with Grandview High School. Portillos earned All-Conference, All-Region, and All-American honors his sophomore year; he was a first-team All-State selection his sophomore, junior, and senior seasons; he was named team captain during his junior and senior years, and was the 2008 Colorado State Player of the Year. While in Aurora, Portillos played his club ball in the Real Colorado system.

After high school, Portillos started school at the University of Washington, where he was named team Rookie of the Year for 2010. Portillos transferred to powerhouse University of Akron for his sophomore season and became a mainstay for the Zips for three years. While in Akron, Portillos worked alongside current Rowdies goalkeepers coach Stuart Dobson.

=== Tampa Bay Rowdies ===
On 23 February 2015 it was announced that Portillos had signed his first professional contract with the Tampa Bay Rowdies of the North American Soccer League. Portillos first arrived in Tampa Bay for the Rowdies' Jan. 30-Feb. 1 invite-only combine, where he impressed Thomas Rongen's coaching staff and joined the team as a trialist. Portillos' first start with the Rowdies came against Swedish Allsvenskan champions Malmö FF, and his first goal was the only one in a 1–0 victory over Portuguese side C.D. Fátima during a preseason tour of Portugal.

Portillos' preseason performance persuaded Head Coach Thomas Rongen to include him in the starting eleven for the Rowdies regular season opener against the defending Soccer Bowl champion San Antonio Scorpions. Portillos played all 90 minutes as part of a staunch Rowdies backline that stifled the Scorpions attack en route to a 3–1 win.

On April 15, Portillos suffered a season-ending injury during training, rupturing his right Achilles tendon. Portillos signed a contract extension with the Rowdies to keep him on the team for the 2016 season on December 22, 2015.
