= Tamika Mkandawire =

Footballer (born 1983)

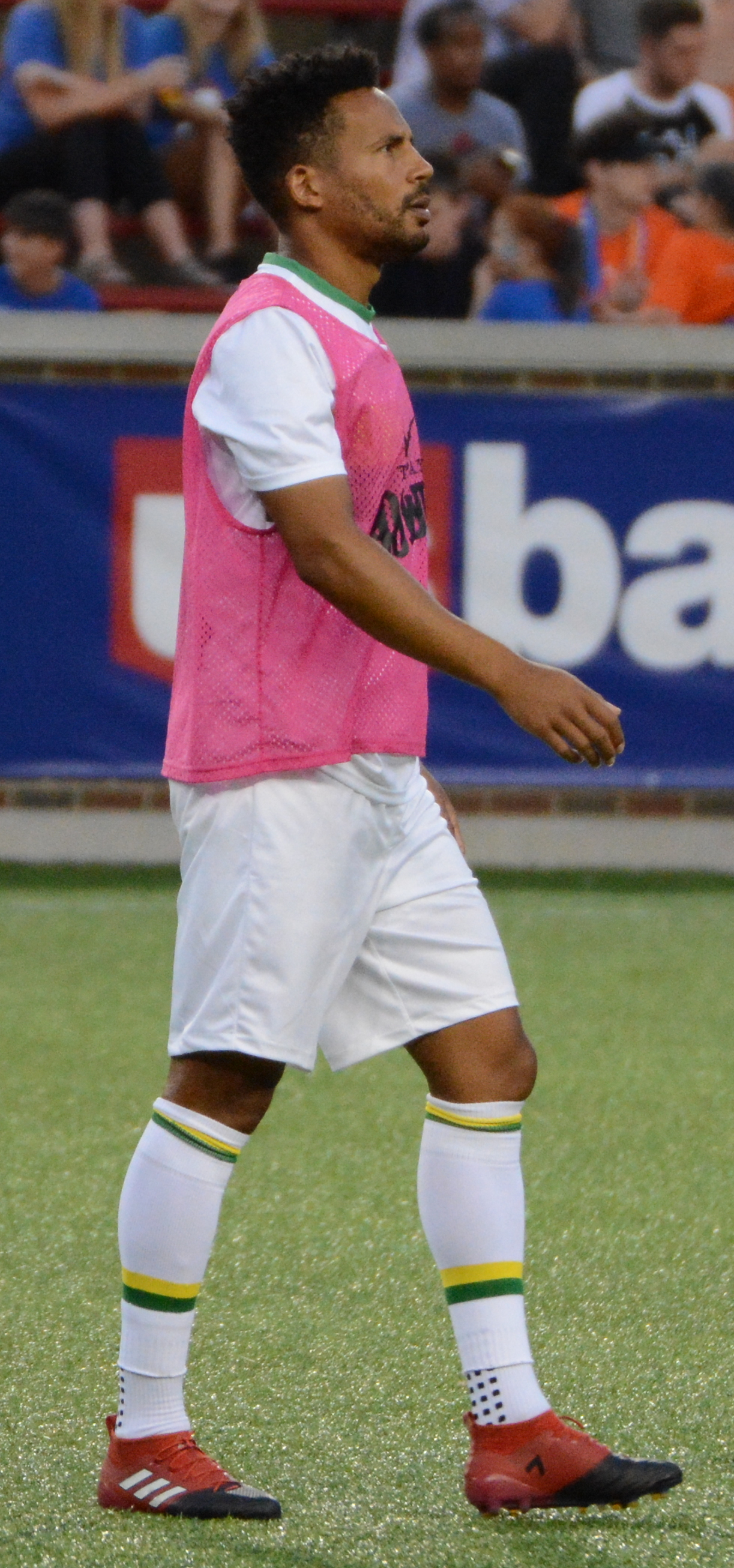
- Mkandawire playing for Tampa Bay Rowdies in 2017

Personal information
- Full name: Tamika Paul Mkandawire
- Date of birth: 28 May 1983 (age 43)
- Place of birth: Mzuzu, Malawi
- Height: 6 ft 0 in (1.83 m)
- Positions: Midfielder; defender

Senior career*
Years	Team	Apps	(Gls)
1999–2004	West Bromwich Albion	1	(0)
2003	→ Hereford United (loan)	9	(1)
2004	→ Hereford United (loan)	5	(0)
2004–2007	Hereford United	112	(12)
2007–2010	Leyton Orient	114	(14)
2010–2013	Millwall	46	(1)
2012–2013	→ Southend United (loan)	18	(0)
2013–2014	Shrewsbury Town	39	(1)
2014–2018	Tampa Bay Rowdies	96	(6)
Total		439	(35)

International career
2005–2006	England C	2	(0)
- * Club domestic league appearances and goals

Tamika Paul Mkandawire (born 28 May 1983) is a former professional footballer who played as a midfielder or defender. Born in Malawi, he made two appearances for the England C national team.

== Early life ==
Born in Mzuzu, Mkandawire came to England aged three, with his English mother and Malawian father and was brought up in Rugby, Warwickshire. He later attended Harris High School in Rugby from 1995 to 1999.

== Club career ==
Mkandawire was a trainee at West Bromwich Albion for five seasons amd made 1 substitute appearance for the first team during preseason of the club's promotion to the premier league in 2001-2022. Albion then released him following relegation to the Championship in 2003. Premier League.

=== Hereford United ===
Having had two loan spells with Hereford United in the 2003–04 season, he signed permanently for them for the 2004–05 season. Prior to this he had a trial in the United States with New England Revolution.

He was a first team regular at centre-back in the 2004–05 season making the most appearances of all the central defenders in the squad. He also chipped in with six goals, more than any other defender that season. This consistency continued into the 2005–06 season where he missed only four matches, and scored nine goals. When club captain Tony James was injured, Mkandawire took the captain's armband and led Hereford to the playoff final, scoring in the crucial semi-final against Morecambe. He lifted the trophy after a 3–2 win over Halifax Town and was subsequently named Player of the Year, for the second season in succession.

For the 2006–07 season he was named as team captain for Hereford's first season back in the Football League. He was a regular in Hereford's defence, scoring twice in the league, and his solid performances had led to speculation over him moving to a bigger club. Despite an improved contract offer in December 2006, which reportedly would have made him the highest earner in the club's history, he decided that his future lay elsewhere.

=== Leyton Orient ===
On 6 June 2007, Mkandawire signed a three-year deal with Leyton Orient, who had previously seen a £60,000 bid rejected. Dubbed one of the best young centre backs in the Football League, he made his Orient debut in a 2–1 win at Southend United on 11 August 2007. Three weeks later, on 1 September, Mkandawire scored his first goal for the club – and Orient's 5000th in league football – in a 2–2 draw with Northampton Town. His performance in Orient's 1–0 home win over AFC Bournemouth on 8 September 2007 earned him a place in the League One Team of the Week. He was named as the club's Player of the Season for 2008–09.

=== Millwall ===
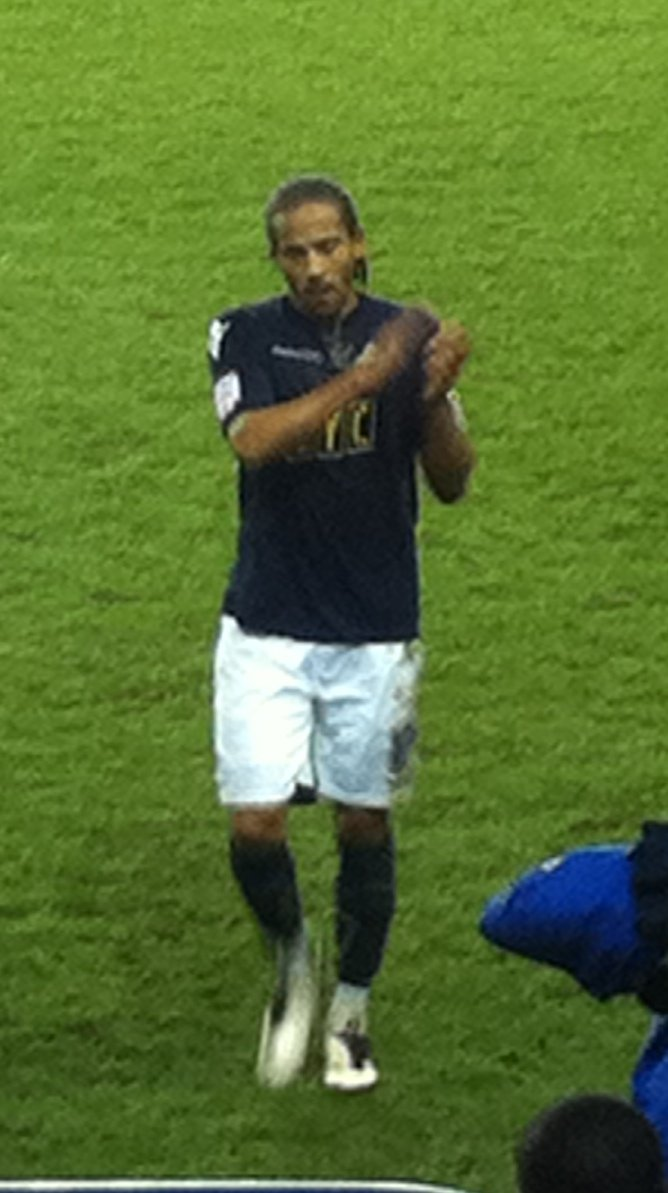
Mkandawire playing for Millwall in 2010

On 16 June 2010, Millwall acquired Mkandawire's services until 30 June 2012 on a free transfer. He has adapted to playing a new defensive holding midfield role for Millwall, switching from his usual central defence position. He scored his first goal for The Lions on 10 December 2010, in a 1–1 draw against Swansea City. Mkandawire was named Millwall's Player of the Year for 2011, garnering 44% of the vote and playing for the majority of the year in a new defensive midfield/centre back role.

=== Shrewsbury Town ===
Mkandawire joined Shrewsbury Town in League One on a free transfer on 1 July 2013 following his release from Millwall. He was named club captain by manager Graham Turner, and made his Shrewsbury debut against Milton Keynes Dons on 3 August 2013. Following Shrewsbury's relegation, Mkandawire was released on 2 June 2014, having come to an agreement with the club to end his contract early.

=== Tampa Bay Rowdies ===
The North American Soccer League's Tampa Bay Rowdies signed Mkandawire on 4 July 2014, along with Argentine striker Luciano Olguín. General manager Perry Van der Beck hopes Mkandawire will add poise and experience to the Rowdies' back line. Mkandawire signed a new contract to remain in Tampa Bay on 15 January 2018. He announced his retirement from football in August 2018.

== International career ==
He holds a United Kingdom citizenship and has played for the English semi-professional team. Malawi does not allow dual citizenship therefore Tamika is currently ineligible to play for Malawi at full international level.

== Personal life ==
Mkandawire is an active fundraiser for charity work in Malawi and in January 2009, he became Ambassador for Sue Ryder international. In March 2012, Tamika won the 'PFA Player in the Community' award at the Football League Awards.

== Career statistics ==
As of 27 April 2014

Appearances and goals by club, season and competition
Club	Season	League			FA Cup		League Cup		Other (Note: Appearances in Football League Trophy)		Total	
Club	Season	Division	Apps	Goals	Apps	Goals	Apps	Goals	Apps	Goals	Apps	Goals
West Bromwich Albion	2002–03	Premier League	0	0	0	0	0	0	0	0	0	0
West Bromwich Albion	2003–04	Division One	0	0	0	0	0	0	0	0	0	0
West Bromwich Albion	Total		0	0	0	0	0	0	0	0	0	0
Hereford United (loan)	2003–04	Conference National	14	1	1	0	0	0	2	0	17	1
Hereford United	2004–05	Conference National	36	4	2	1	0	0	4	0	42	5
Hereford United	2005–06	Conference National	42	6	3	0	0	0	4	2	49	8
Hereford United	2006–07	League Two	39	2	4	0	2	0	1	0	46	2
Hereford United	Total		117	12	9	1	2	0	9	2	137	15
Leyton Orient	2007–08	League One	35	3	2	0	2	0	1	0	40	3
Leyton Orient	2008–09	League One	36	5	2	0	1	0	0	0	39	5
Leyton Orient	2009–10	League One	43	7	1	0	2	0	1	0	47	7
Leyton Orient	Total		114	15	5	0	5	0	2	0	126	15
Millwall	2010–11	Championship	35	1	1	0	2	0	0	0	38	1
Millwall	2011–12	Championship	13	0	0	0	2	1	0	0	15	1
Millwall	2012–13	Championship	0	0	0	0	0	0	0	0	0	0
Millwall	Total		48	1	1	0	4	1	0	0	53	2
Southend United (loan)	2012–13	League Two	18	0	0	0	0	0	2	1	20	1
Shrewsbury Town	2013–14	League One	39	1	1	0	1	0	1	0	42	1
Career total			350	30	17	1	12	1	16	3	395	35

== Honours ==
Southend United

- Football League Trophy runner-up: 2012–13

Individual

- Leyton Orient Player of the Season: 2008–09
- Millwall Player of the Season: 2010–11
- PFA Player in the Community Award: 2011–12
