= Jeff Michaud =

American soccer player (born 1993)

Personal information
- Full name: Jeffrey Michaud
- Date of birth: September 30, 1993 (age 33)
- Place of birth: West Palm Beach, Florida, United States
- Height: 1.80 m (5 ft 11 in)
- Position: Midfielder

Team information
- Current team: St. Louis Ambush
- Number: 22

College career
Years	Team	Apps	(Gls)
2011–2012	UCF Knights	9	(1)
2013–2014	EFSC Titans		

Senior career*
Years	Team	Apps	(Gls)
2011	Fort Lauderdale Schulz Academy	10	(1)
2015–2016	Tampa Bay Rowdies	4	(0)
2016	→ Wilmington Hammerheads (loan)	25	(1)
2017	South Florida Surf	9	(1)
2018	Miami FC	19	(4)
2019	Forward Madison FC	10	(0)
2019–2020	Orlando SeaWolves (indoor)	16	(12)
2020–2022	Baltimore Blast (indoor)	8	(2)
2022–	St. Louis Ambush (indoor)	10	(2)
- * Club domestic league appearances and goals as of December 16, 2022

Jeffrey Michaud (born September 30, 1993) is an American soccer player who plays for the St. Louis Ambush of the Major Arena Soccer League.

== Career ==
=== College and Youth ===
Michaud played four years of college soccer, beginning at the University of Central Florida between in 2011, before transferring to Eastern Florida State College in 2013.

Michaud appeared for Premier Development League side Fort Lauderdale Schulz Academy in 2011.

=== Tampa Bay Rowdies ===
Michaud signed for North American Soccer League side Tampa Bay Rowdies on February 24, 2015. Michaud played in four matches in his rookie season, logging 32 minutes of playtime.

In February 2016, Michaud made preseason appearances in games against Major League Soccer's D.C. United, Philadelphia Union, and Montreal Impact. On March 11, 2016, it was announced that he would be joining the USL's Wilmington Hammerheads on a season-long loan.

=== Forward Madison ===
After stints with the South Florida Surf in USL League Two and Miami FC in the National Premier Soccer League, Michaud joined USL League One club Forward Madison FC ahead of their inaugural season. He made his league debut for the club on April 6, 2019, in a 1–0 away defeat to Chattanooga Red Wolves. On June 27, 2019, Michaud and Madison mutually terminated his contract.
