= Darnell King =

American soccer player

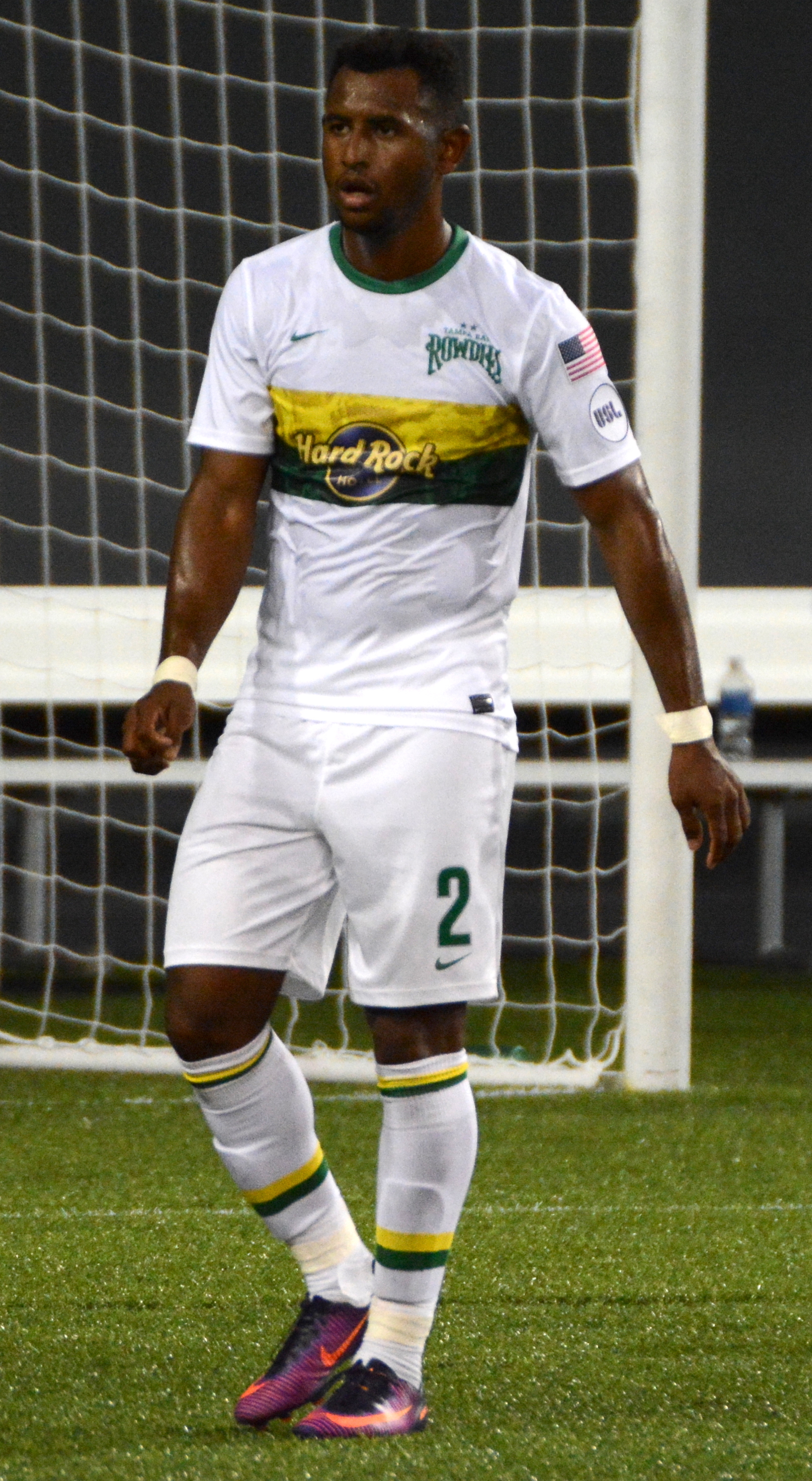
- King playing for Tampa Bay Rowdies in 2017

Personal information
- Full name: Darnell King
- Date of birth: September 23, 1990 (age 36)
- Place of birth: Tampa, Florida, United States
- Height: 1.73 m (5 ft 8 in)
- Positions: Winger; full back

College career
Years	Team	Apps	(Gls)
2008–2011	Florida Atlantic Owls	62	(17)

Senior career*
Years	Team	Apps	(Gls)
2010	Fort Lauderdale Schulz Academy	3	(0)
2012–2014	Fort Lauderdale Strikers	75	(6)
2015–2017	Tampa Bay Rowdies	81	(1)
2018	San Antonio FC	32	(2)
2019	Nashville SC	21	(0)
2020–2023	Phoenix Rising	97	(4)
2025	Phoenix Rising	1	(0)

Managerial career
- 2024–: Phoenix Rising (assistant)
- * Club domestic league appearances and goals as of January 4, 2024

Darnell King (born September 23, 1990) is an American former professional soccer player and current assistant coach of Phoenix Rising FC in the USL Championship.

== Career ==
King played in forward for Tampa's Gaither High School, setting a school record with 71 points in a season. In 2008, his senior year, King was named to the All-Hillsborough County team.

From 2008 to 2011, King played as a forward for the Florida Atlantic Owls. King was the Owls' leading scorer during his sophomore, junior, and senior seasons.

King participated in the 2012 NASL Combine where he was noticed by Fort Lauderdale Strikers' coaching staff. He was invited to preseason with the Strikers, where he impressed enough to earn his first professional contract. On March 27, 2012, the Strikers announced that King had signed professional terms with the club.

King made his professional debut with the Strikers as a second-half sub against FC Edmonton on April 7, 2012, in the first game of the 2012 NASL season. He played 15 minutes after replacing Leopoldo Morales in the 75th minute. On July 2, King started and played 90 minutes in an unfamiliar right back position, and took the throw-in that lead to the opening goal. He started at right back in the Strikers' next match against the Carolina RailHawks, and scored his first goal as a professional in the 31st minute of the 3–3 draw. King ended up primarily playing right back for the Strikers and was named to the 2014 NASL Best XI as a defender.

On December 22, 2014, King returned to Tampa Bay by signing with the NASL's Tampa Bay Rowdies

On February 6, 2018, King made the move to United Soccer League side San Antonio FC. King earned a spot on the All-League team at the end of 2018.

King signed with Nashville SC on December 4, 2018, rejoining former Rowdies teammate Matt Pickens. He then signed with Phoenix Rising FC on December 18, 2019.

Following a 2023 USL Championship season that saw Phoenix win the league, King announced his retirement on January 4, 2024. He transitioned to a coaching role with Phoenix Rising.

Ahead of Phoenix Rising’s week 4 clash of the 2025 USL Championship season against Monterey Bay, nine players were out with injuries. King was called up to the squad, as he would then come off the bench in the 69th minute after Phoenix were down to nine men. The match ended in a 3-1 loss for Phoenix.

== Career statistics ==
Statistics accurate as of December 4, 2018

Club	Season	League			Cup			Playoffs			Total		
Club	Season	Apps	Goals	Assists	Apps	Goals	Assists	Apps	Goals	Assists	Apps	Goals	Assists
Fort Lauderdale Strikers	2012	22	1	2	1	0	0	1	0	0	24	1	2
Fort Lauderdale Strikers	2013	26	3	1	2	0	1	—	—	—	28	3	2
Fort Lauderdale Strikers	2014	21	2	4	1	0	0	—	—	—	22	2	4
Tampa Bay Rowdies	2015	27	1	2	1	0	0	—	—	—	28	1	2
Tampa Bay Rowdies	2016	30	0	2	2	0	0	—	—	—	32	0	2
Tampa Bay Rowdies	2017	24	0	1	1	0	0	2	0	0	27	0	1
San Antonio FC	2018	32	2	5	3	1	0	—	—	—	35	3	5
Nashville SC	2019	0	0	0	0	0	0	—	—	—	0	0	0
Career total		182	9	17	11	1	1	3	0	0	196	10	18
