= 2015 FC Edmonton season =

FC Edmonton
2015 season
- Ownership: Tom Fath; Dave Fath
- Head Coach: Colin Miller
- Stadium: Clarke Stadium
- NASL: Spring: 10th Fall: 5th Combined: 7th
- Soccer Bowl: Did not qualify
- Canadian Championship: Semi-finals
- Top goalscorer: League: Daryl Fordyce (8 goals); Lance Laing (8 goals); All: Tomi Ameobi (11 goals)
- Highest home attendance: 4,240 (27 Sep v. New York)
- Lowest home attendance: League: 2,022 (16 Aug v. Carolina); All: 1,858 (29 Apr v. Ottawa)
- Average home league attendance: League: 3,122; All: 3,083

The 2015 FC Edmonton season was the club's fifth season at the professional level in the North American Soccer League.

== Transfers ==
=== In ===
Date	Position	Nationality	Name	From	Fee
12 November 2014	MF	(El Salvador)	Tomas Granitto	(El Salvador) Firpo	Free
18 December 2014	GK	(United States)	Matt Van Oekel	(United States) Minnesota United	Free
15 January 2015	MF	(Iceland)	Óskar Örn Hauksson	(Iceland) KR Reykjavík	Loan
22 January 2015	DF	(Canada)	Allan Zebie	FC Edmonton Reserves	–
10 February 2015	MF	(The Gambia)	Sainey Nyassi	(Finland) Rovaniemi	Free
17 March 2015	DF	(United States)	Johann Smith	Unattached	–
18 June 2015	MF	(United States)	Pablo Cruz	(United States) San Antonio Scorpions	Free
18 June 2015	MF	(Brazil)	Thiago de Freitas	(Greece) Alimos	Free
30 July 2015	MF	(El Salvador)	Dustin Corea	(El Salvador) FAS	Undisclosed

=== Out ===
Date	Position	Nationality	Name	To	Fee
6 November 2014	MF	(Ghana)	Edem Mortotsi	Unattached	–
6 November 2014	MF	(United States)	Mike Banner	Unattached	–
6 November 2014	GK	(United States)	Lance Parker	Unattached	–
9 January 2015	MF	(United States)	Neil Hlavaty	(United States) Carolina RailHawks	Free
20 March 2015	MF	(Canada)	Massimo Mirabelli	Toronto FC II	Free
28 March 2015	MF	(United States)	Milton Blanco	(United States) Arizona United	Free
1 April 2015	DF	(United States)	Beto Navarro	(United States) Orange County Blues	Free
April 9, 2015	MF	(Jamaica)	Horace James	(Malaysia) Perak	Free
April 24, 2015	MF	(Iceland)	Óskar Örn Hauksson	(Iceland) KR Reykjavík	End of loan
June 16, 2015	MF	(United States)	Chad Burt	Unattached	–

== Pre-season ==
21 March 2015 Friendly	Jacksonville United FC	0 – 6	FC Edmonton	Jacksonville, Florida
		Report	Hauksson 35'; Ameobi 45'; Jonke 52'; Jalali; Shores; Fordyce

25 March 2015 Friendly	Tampa Bay Rowdies	2 – 1	FC Edmonton	Jacksonville, Florida
17:30 EST	Hristov; Shriver	Report	Jonke	Stadium: D. B. Milne Field

28 March 2015 Friendly	Carolina RailHawks	0 – 0	FC Edmonton	Jacksonville, Florida
15:00 EST		Report		Stadium: EverBank Field

== Competitions ==
=== NASL Spring Season ===
==== Standings ====
Pos	Team	Pld	W	D	L	GF	GA	GD	Pts	Qualification
1	New York Cosmos (S)	10	5	5	0	18	9	+9	20	Playoffs
2	Tampa Bay Rowdies	10	5	4	1	15	9	+6	19	
3	Carolina RailHawks	10	3	5	2	15	10	+5	14	
4	Minnesota United	10	3	5	2	15	13	+2	14	
5	Indy Eleven	10	3	4	3	13	12	+1	13	
6	Jacksonville Armada	10	3	3	4	15	18	−3	12	
7	San Antonio Scorpions	10	3	3	4	11	15	−4	12	
8	Fort Lauderdale Strikers	10	3	2	5	12	13	−1	11	
9	Ottawa Fury	10	2	5	3	5	8	−3	11	
10	FC Edmonton	10	2	3	5	16	22	−6	9	
11	Atlanta Silverbacks	10	1	5	4	7	13	−6	8	

Source: NASL
Rules for classification: 1) points; 2) total goal differential; 3) total goals scored; 4) head-to-head record; 5) away goal differential; 6) away goals scored
(S) Spring season champion

==== Results summary ====
Overall								Home						Away					
Pld	W	D	L	GF	GA	GD	Pts	W	D	L	GF	GA	GD	W	D	L	GF	GA	GD
10	2	3	5	16	22	−6	9	2	2	1	12	10	+2	0	1	4	4	12	−8

Last updated: August 19, 2015.
Source: Match reports

==== Results by round ====
Round	1	2	3	4	5	6	7	8	9	10
Ground	A	H	H	H	A	H	H	A	A	A
Result	L	D	W	D	L	L	W	D	L	L

Updated to match(es) played on August 19, 2015. Source: Match reports
A = Away; H = Home; W = Win; D = Draw; L = Loss

==== Match Reports ====
4 April 2015 1	Jacksonville Armada FC	3 – 1	FC Edmonton	Jacksonville, Florida
19:30 EDT UTC−4	Johnson (Trejo) 1'; Ortiz (yellow card) 4'; Scaglia (yellow card) 32'; Keita 43'; Flores (Hoyos) 45'; Millien (yellow card) 89'	Report	Jones (Laing) 52'; Jones (yellow card) 67'; Edward (yellow card) 90'	Stadium: EverBank Field; Attendance: 16,164; Referee: Marcos de Oliveira

12 April 2015 2	FC Edmonton	1 – 1	Carolina RailHawks	Edmonton, Alberta
16:00 EDT UTC−4	Laing (Nyassi) 45'; Moses (yellow card) 60'	Report	Novo (Osaki) 41'; Wagner (yellow card) 65'; Nurse (yellow card) 79'; Albadawi (yellow card) 85'	Stadium: Clarke Stadium; Attendance: 2,492; Referee: Juan Marquez

19 April 2015 3	FC Edmonton	3 – 2	Fort Lauderdale Strikers	Edmonton, Alberta
16:00 EDT UTC−4	Jones (Nyassi) 7'; Jonke (yellow card) 31'; Moses (yellow card) 42'; Nyassi 75'; Ameobi (Laing) 80'; Jones (yellow card) 86'; Laing (yellow card) 89'	Report	Sánchez 20'; Moura (yellow card) 49'; Moura 62'	Stadium: Clarke Stadium; Attendance: 2,351; Referee: Robert Scaap

3 May 2015 4 – Flyover Cup	FC Edmonton	2 – 2	Minnesota United FC	Edmonton, Alberta
16:00 EDT UTC−4	Raudales (yellow card) 41'; Nyassi (yellow card) 47'; Laing 51'; Watson (yellow card) 56'; Ameobi (Laing) 71'; Fordyce (red card) 84'	Report	Ibarra 2'; Watson (yellow card) 80'; Watson 85' (pen.); Campos (yellow card) 86'	Stadium: Clarke Stadium; Attendance: 2,986; Referee: Geoff Gamble

10 May 2015 5	New York Cosmos	4 – 2	FC Edmonton	Hempstead, New York
14:00 EDT UTC−4	Mendes 2'; Raúl 23'; Senna (yellow card) 32'; Mendes (García) 36'; Mkosana (Fernandes) 49'	Report	Ameobi 17' (pen.); Edward (yellow card) 65'; Jones (Ameobi) 74'	Stadium: Shuart Stadium; Attendance: 3,383; Referee: Alejandro Mariscal

17 May 2015 6	FC Edmonton	2 – 3	San Antonio Scorpions	Edmonton, Alberta
16:00 EDT UTC−4	Fordyce (Smith) 53'; Fordyce 74'	Report	Cummings 21'; Forbes (DeRoux) 62'; Forbes 82'	Stadium: Clarke Stadium; Attendance: 2,236; Referee: Justin Tasev

24 May 2015 7	FC Edmonton	4 – 2	Atlanta Silverbacks	Edmonton, Alberta
16:00 EDT UTC−4	Laing 41'; Laing (yellow card) 42'; Jones (Ameobi) 54'; Fordyce 66'; Raudales (yellow card) 80'; Moses (Laing) 85'; Moses (yellow card) 85'	Report	Reed (yellow card) 36'; Oppong (yellow card) 58'; McKenzie (yellow card) 63'; Chávez (Miller) 76'; Christian (Black) 88'	Stadium: Clarke Stadium; Attendance: 3,756; Referee: Francis Latulippe

29 May 2015 8	Ottawa Fury FC	0 – 0	FC Edmonton	Ottawa, Ontario
19:00 EDT UTC−4	Trafford (yellow card) 84'	Report		Stadium: TD Place Stadium; Attendance: 5,064; Referee: Robert Schaap

6 June 2015 9	Tampa Bay Rowdies	2 – 1	FC Edmonton	St. Petersburg, Florida
19:30 EDT UTC−4	Sweat (yellow card) 9'; Espinal 37'; Shriver 60'; Mkandawire (yellow card) 72'; Agbossoumonde (yellow card) 83'	Report	Raudales (yellow card) 45'; Moses (yellow card) 59'; Laing (Burt) 64'	Stadium: Al Land Stadium; Attendance: 4,961; Referee: Alejandro Mariscal

13 June 2015 10	Indy Eleven	3 – 0	FC Edmonton	Indianapolis, Indiana
19:30 EDT UTC−4	Brown (Mares) 39'; Mares 44' (pen.); Lacroix (Rugg) 82'; Miller (yellow card) 83'	Report	Raudales (red card) 67'; Jonke (yellow card) 90'	Stadium: Michael Carroll Stadium; Attendance: 10,202; Referee: Christopher Penso

=== Fall Season ===
==== Standings ====
Pos	Team	Pld	W	D	L	GF	GA	GD	Pts	Qualification
1	Ottawa Fury (F)	20	13	6	1	37	15	+22	45	Playoffs
2	Minnesota United	20	11	6	3	39	26	+13	39	
3	New York Cosmos	20	10	6	4	31	21	+10	36	
4	Fort Lauderdale Strikers	20	8	6	6	37	27	+10	30	
5	FC Edmonton	20	7	5	8	25	24	+1	26	
6	Atlanta Silverbacks	20	6	7	7	24	27	−3	25	
7	Carolina RailHawks	20	6	3	11	29	39	−10	21	
8	Tampa Bay Rowdies	20	5	5	10	18	28	−10	20	
9	Indy Eleven	20	5	5	10	23	36	−13	20	
10	San Antonio Scorpions	20	4	7	9	30	37	−7	19	
11	Jacksonville Armada	20	5	4	11	18	31	−13	19	

Source: NASL
Rules for classification: 1) points; 2) total goal differential; 3) total goals scored; 4) head-to-head record; 5) away goal differential; 6) away goals scored
(F) Fall season champion

==== Results summary ====
Overall								Home						Away					
Pld	W	D	L	GF	GA	GD	Pts	W	D	L	GF	GA	GD	W	D	L	GF	GA	GD
20	7	5	8	25	24	+1	26	5	2	3	15	9	+6	2	3	5	10	15	−5

Last updated: October 25, 2015.
Source: Match reports

==== Results by round ====
Round	1	2	3	4	5	6	7	8	9	10	11	12	13	14	15	16	17	18	19	20
Ground	H	A	A	A	H	H	H	A	H	H	A	H	H	A	H	A	A	A	A	H
Result	W	D	D	W	L	L	W	D	W	L	L	D	W	W	W	L	L	L	L	D

Updated to match(es) played on October 17, 2015. Source: Match reports
A = Away; H = Home; W = Win; D = Draw; L = Loss

==== Match Reports ====
5 July 2015 1 – Wood Buffalo Cup	FC Edmonton	4 – 0	San Antonio Scorpions	Fort McMurray, Alberta
16:00 EDT UTC−4	Jalali 2' (pen.); Smith (yellow card) 5'; Edward (yellow card) 31'; Laing 68' (pen.); Boakai (Jalali) 74'; Laing 83'	Report	Soto (yellow card) 19'; Attakora (red card) 66'; Sattler (red card) 69'; Castillo (yellow card) 82'	Stadium: SMS Equipment Stadium; Attendance: 1,112; Referee: (United States) Yusri Rudolf

11 July 2015 2	Fort Lauderdale Strikers	1 – 1	FC Edmonton	Fort Lauderdale, Florida
19:30 EDT UTC−4	Ramírez (yellow card) 16'; Ramírez 68' (pen.)	Report	Nonni (yellow card) 32'; Ford 86' (o.g.); Raudales (yellow card) 90'	Stadium: Lockhart Stadium; Attendance: 3,816; Referee: (United States) Daniel Fitzgerald

15 July 2015 3	San Antonio Scorpions	2 – 2	FC Edmonton	San Antonio
20:30 EDT UTC−4	Cummings (Forbes) 17'; Elizondo (Forbes) 57'; Gibson (yellow card) 58'; Castillo (yellow card) 90'	Report	de Freitas (yellow card) 27'; Nonni (Smith) 36'; Smith (yellow card) 40'; Raudales (Nonni) 71'	Stadium: Toyota Field; Attendance: 4,912; Referee: (United States) Mark Kadlecik

18 July 2015 4	Tampa Bay Rowdies	0 – 1	FC Edmonton	St. Petersburg, Florida
19:30 EDT UTC−4	Hernández (yellow card) 80'	Report	Antonijevic 56' (o.g.); Jalali (yellow card) 73'	Stadium: Al Lang Stadium; Attendance: 5,496; Referee: (United States) Rubiel Vazquez

26 July 2015 5	FC Edmonton	1 – 3	Atlanta Silverbacks	Edmonton, Alberta
16:00 EDT UTC−4	Watson (yellow card) 26'; Ameobi (Watson) 85'	Report	Mensing (yellow card) 29'; Chavez (Pe. Ferreira-Mendes) 49'; Chavez (Burgos) 66'; Mravec (red card) 72'; Bangura (Chavez) 88'	Stadium: Clarke Stadium; Attendance: 4,232; Referee: (United States) Juan Marquez

2 August 2015 6	FC Edmonton	0 – 1	Ottawa Fury FC	Fort McMurray, Alberta
16:00 EDT UTC−4	Watson (yellow card) 15'; Edward (yellow card) 53'	Report	Ubiparipović (yellow card) 2'; Alves (Ubiparipović) 90'	Stadium: SMS Equipment Stadium; Attendance: 1,626; Referee: (Canada) Robert Schaap

5 August 2015 7	FC Edmonton	2 – 0	Indy Eleven	Edmonton, Alberta
21:00 EDT UTC−4	Watson (Laing) 16'; Ameobi 70'; Laing (yellow card) 80'; Smith (yellow card) 83'	Report		Stadium: Clarke Stadium; Attendance: 3,120; Referee: (United States) David Barrie

8 August 2015 8 – Flyover Cup	Minnesota United FC	1 – 1	FC Edmonton	Blaine, Minnesota
20:00 EDT UTC−4	Alhassan (yellow card) 40'; Ramirez 47' (pen.); Davis (yellow card) 70'; Vicentini (yellow card) 88'	Report	Raudales (yellow card) 34'; Laing (yellow card) 58'; Ameobi (Laing) 71' de Freitas (yellow card) 82'	Stadium: NSC Stadium; Attendance: 9,077; Referee: (United States) Daniel Radford

16 August 2015 9	FC Edmonton	3 – 0	Carolina RailHawks	Edmonton, Alberta
16:00 EDT UTC−4	Ameobi (Corea) 11'; Laing 27'; Corea (Fordyce) 36'; Moses (yellow card) 59'	Report	Nurse (yellow card) 33'; Albadawi (yellow card) 70'; Tobin (yellow card) 77'	Stadium: Clarke Stadium; Attendance: 2,022; Referee: (United States) Juan Marquez

23 August 2015 10	FC Edmonton	0 – 2	Fort Lauderdale Strikers	Edmonton, Alberta
16:00 EDT UTC−4		Summary	Pinho 58' (pen.); Pinho (Chin) 86'	Stadium: Clarke Stadium; Attendance: 3,110; Referee: (Canada) Pierre Lauziere

29 August 2015 11	Atlanta Silverbacks	1 – 0	FC Edmonton	Chamblee, Georgia
19:30 EDT UTC−4	Black (yellow card) 30'; Pa. Ferreira-Mendes (yellow card) 77'; Burgos 81'	Summary	Jones (yellow card) 35'; Raudales (yellow card) 48'	Stadium: Atlanta Silverbacks Park; Attendance: 3,601; Referee: (United States) Alejandro Mariscal

6 September 2015 12 – Flyover Cup	FC Edmonton	1 – 1	Minnesota United FC	Edmonton, Alberta
16:00 EDT UTC−4	Nonni (yellow card) 13'; Raudales (yellow card) 17'; Nonni (yellow card) 25' (red card); Fordyce 90+4'	Summary	Alhassan 11'	Stadium: Clarke Stadium; Attendance: 3,156; Referee: (United States) Yusri Rudolf

13 September 2015 13	FC Edmonton	1 – 0	Tampa Bay Rowdies	Edmonton, Alberta
16:00 EDT UTC−4	Watson (Corea) 16'; Laing (yellow card) 73'	Summary		Stadium: Clarke Stadium; Attendance: 4,160; Referee: (Canada) Justin Tasev

19 September 2015 14	Indy Eleven	0 – 2	FC Edmonton	Indianapolis
19:30 EDT UTC−4	Ring (yellow card) 72'	Summary	Roberts (yellow card) 45'; Corea (yellow card) 47'; Fordyce (Laing) 55'; Nyassi (Jones) 85'	Stadium: Michael Carroll Stadium; Attendance: 9,840; Referee: (United States) Alejandro Mariscal

27 September 2015 15	FC Edmonton	2 – 1	New York Cosmos	Edmonton, Alberta
16:00 EDT UTC−4	Laing 41'; Fordyce (Corea) 43'; Watson (yellow card) 57'; Raudales (yellow card) 79'	Summary	Senna 58' (pen.); Cruz (yellow card) 62'	Stadium: Clarke Stadium; Attendance: 4,240; Referee: (United States) Juan Marquez

4 October 2015 16	Ottawa Fury FC	2 – 0	FC Edmonton	Ottawa, Ontario
15:00 EDT UTC−4	Ubiparipović (Paulo Jr.) 23'; Ubiparipović 72'; Richter (yellow card) 79'; Ubiparipović (yellow card) 80'	Summary		Stadium: TD Place Stadium; Attendance: 6,050; Referee: (Canada) Robert Schaap

11 October 2015 17	New York Cosmos	3 – 0	FC Edmonton	Hempstead, New York
17:00 EDT UTC−4	Guenzatti (Cellerino) 37'; Raúl (García) 45'; Szetela (yellow card) 84'; Bover 85'	Summary	Smith (yellow card) 37'; Moses (yellow card) 59'	Stadium: Shuart Stadium; Attendance: 4,286; Referee: (United States) Robert Sibiga

14 October 2015 18	Carolina RailHawks	2 – 1	FC Edmonton	Cary, North Carolina
19:30 EDT UTC−4	Albadawi (da Luz) 10'; Novo (da Luz) 83'; Miller (yellow card) 90'	Summary	Watson (yellow card) 38'; Fordyce 45+2' (pen.); Watson (yellow card) 62' (red card); Ameobi (yellow card) 72'	Stadium: WakeMed Soccer Park; Attendance: 3,558; Referee: (United States) Marcos de Oliveira

17 October 2015 19	Jacksonville Armada FC	3 – 2	FC Edmonton	Jacksonville, Florida
19:30 EDT UTC−4	Keita (yellow card) 14'; Scaglia (yellow card) 24'; Keita (Johnson) 31'; Keita (yellow card) 51' (red card); Millien 67' (pen.); Barrett 70'; Gallardo (yellow card) 80'	Summary	Moses (yellow card) 38'; Fordyce 62'; Nyassi 65'	Stadium: Community First Park; Attendance: 6,503; Referee: (United States) Daniel Fitzgerald

25 October 2015 20	FC Edmonton	1 – 1	Jacksonville Armada FC	Edmonton, Alberta
16:00 EDT UTC−4	Jones (yellow card) 12'; Jones (yellow card) 67' (red card); Roberts (Nyassi) 90+'	Summary	Bahner (yellow card) 67'; Watson 77' (o.g.)	Stadium: Clarke Stadium; Attendance: 2,730; Referee: (Canada) Alain Ruch

=== NASL Combined Season ===
==== Standings ====
Pos	Team	Pld	W	D	L	GF	GA	GD	Pts	Qualification
1	New York Cosmos (C, X)	30	15	11	4	49	30	+19	56	Championship qualifiers (Note: As spring season champions)
2	Ottawa Fury	30	15	11	4	42	23	+19	56	Championship qualifiers (Note: As fall season champions)
3	Minnesota United	30	14	11	5	54	39	+15	53	Championship qualifiers (Note: As next best teams in overall standings)
4	Fort Lauderdale Strikers	30	11	8	11	49	40	+9	41	Championship qualifiers
5	Tampa Bay Rowdies	30	10	9	11	33	37	−4	39	
6	Carolina RailHawks	30	9	8	13	44	49	−5	35	
7	FC Edmonton	30	9	8	13	41	46	−5	35	
8	Atlanta Silverbacks	30	7	12	11	31	40	−9	33	
9	Indy Eleven	30	8	9	13	36	48	−12	33	
10	San Antonio Scorpions	30	7	10	13	41	52	−11	31	
11	Jacksonville Armada	30	8	7	15	33	49	−16	31	

Source: NASL
Rules for classification: 1) points; 2) total goal differential; 3) total goals scored; 4) head-to-head record; 5) away goal differential; 6) away goals scored
(C) Champions; (X) Regular season champion

==== Results summary ====
Overall								Home						Away					
Pld	W	D	L	GF	GA	GD	Pts	W	D	L	GF	GA	GD	W	D	L	GF	GA	GD
30	9	8	13	41	46	−5	35	7	4	4	27	19	+8	2	4	9	14	27	−13

Last updated: October 25, 2015.
Source: Match reports

==== Results by round ====
Round	1	2	3	4	5	6	7	8	9	10	11	12	13	14	15	16	17	18	19	20	21	22	23	24	25	26	27	28	29	30
Ground	A	H	H	H	A	H	H	A	A	A	H	A	A	A	H	H	H	A	H	H	A	H	H	A	H	A	A	A	A	H
Result	L	D	W	D	L	L	W	D	L	L	W	D	D	W	L	L	W	D	W	L	L	D	W	W	W	L	L	L	L	D

Updated to match(es) played on October 25, 2015. Source: Match reports
A = Away; H = Home; W = Win; D = Draw; L = Loss

=== Canadian Championship ===
Preliminary Round

22 April 2015 First leg	Ottawa Fury FC	1–3	FC Edmonton	Ottawa, Ontario
19:30 EDT UTC−4	Oliver 2'; Alves (yellow card) 28'	Report	Jones (yellow card) 76'; Fordyce 83'; Laing 88'; Ameobi (Laing) 90+5'	Stadium: TD Place Stadium; Attendance: 2,402

29 April 2015 Second leg	FC Edmonton	3–1 (6–2 agg.)	Ottawa Fury FC	Edmonton, Alberta
22:00 EDT UTC−4	Ameobi 8'; Nyassi (Laing) 14'; Watson (yellow card) 59'; Fordyce 81' (pen.)	Report	Wiedeman (Haworth) 33'; Beckie (yellow card) 66'	Stadium: Clarke Stadium; Attendance: 1,858

Semi–finals

May 13, 2015 First leg	Vancouver Whitecaps FC	1–1	FC Edmonton	Vancouver, British Columbia
19:00 PDT (UTC−07)	Flores (yellow card) 51'; Koffie (yellow card) 59'; Koffie 87'	Report	Ameobi 4'; Smith (yellow card) 26'	Stadium: BC Place; Attendance: 15,183; Referee: David Gantar

May 20, 2015 Second leg	FC Edmonton	1–2 (2–3 agg.)	Vancouver Whitecaps FC	Edmonton, Alberta
20:00 MDT (UTC−06)	Van Oekel (yellow card) 8'; Granitto (yellow card) 38'; Raudales (yellow card) 64'; Ameobi 90+1' (pen.); Edward (yellow card) 90+6'	Report	Morales 9' (pen.); Mezquida (yellow card) 19'; Mattocks (yellow card) 59'; Sampson (yellow card) 72'; Dean (yellow card) 73'; Laba 90+7'	Stadium: Clarke Stadium; Attendance: 3,803; Referee: Silviu Petrescu
Note: Edmonton had originally been scheduled to host the first leg of their semi-final against Vancouver in Edmonton on May 6, 2015 but the match was postponed due to snow.

== Squad statistics ==
=== Appearances and goals ===
As of match played 25 October 2015

No.	Pos	Nat	Player	Total		NASL Season		Canadian Championship	
No.	Pos	Nat	Player	Apps	Goals	Apps	Goals	Apps	Goals
1	GK	(United States) USA	Matt Van Oekel	29	0	24+1	0	4+0	0
2	DF	(Canada) CAN	Allan Zebie	22	0	18+3	0	1+0	0
3	DF	(Canada) CAN	Edson Edward	30	0	26+0	0	4+0	0
5	DF	(Northern Ireland) NIR	Albert Watson	31	2	28+0	2	3+0	0
6	FW	(El Salvador) ESA	Dustin Corea	15	1	14+1	1	0+0	0
7	MF	(Honduras) HON	Cristian Raudales	30	1	22+4	1	3+1	0
8	MF	(England) ENG	Ritchie Jones	26	4	19+3	4	4+0	0
9	FW	(Canada) CAN	Sadi Jalali	9	1	5+3	1	1+0	0
10	MF	(El Salvador) ESA	Tomas Granitto	17	0	8+6	0	2+1	0
11	MF	(Brazil) BRA	Thiago de Freitas	13	0	11+2	0	0+0	0
12	DF	(Trinidad and Tobago) TTO	Kareem Moses	24	1	19+2	1	3+0	0
13	FW	(Canada) CAN	Frank Jonke	17	0	7+9	0	0+1	0
14	MF	(The Gambia) GAM	Sainey Nyassi	25	4	11+10	3	4+0	1
15	DF	(Canada) CAN	Mallan Roberts	25	1	21+0	1	4+0	0
16	FW	(Northern Ireland) NIR	Daryl Fordyce	26	10	17+5	8	2+2	2
17	MF	(Jamaica) JAM	Lance Laing	24	9	19+1	8	3+1	1
18	FW	(England) ENG	Tomi Ameobi	22	11	11+7	7	4+0	4
19	MF	(Canada) CAN	Hanson Boakai	14	1	2+10	1	0+2	0
21	GK	(Canada) CAN	Tyson Farago	2	0	2+0	0	0+0	0
22	DF	(Canada) CAN	Michael Nonni	17	1	9+6	1	0+2	0
23	GK	(Canada) CAN	John Smits	4	0	4+0	0	0+0	0
24	DF	(United States) USA	Johann Smith	24	0	21+1	0	2+0	0
27	MF	(United States) USA	Pablo Cruz	12	0	6+6	0	0+0	0
28	MF	(Canada) CAN	Bruno Zebie	1	0	0+1	0	0+0	0
Players who appeared for Edmonton but left during the season:
20	MF	(United States) USA	Chad Burt	9	0	6+2	0	0+1	0

=== Goal scorers ===
As of match played 16 August 2015

Place	Position	Nation	Number	Name	NASL Season	Canadian Championship	Total
1	FW	(England)	18	Tomi Ameobi	7	4	11
2	MF	(Jamaica)	17	Lance Laing	7	1	8
3	FW	(Northern Ireland)	16	Daryl Fordyce	3	2	5
4	MF	(England)	8	Ritchie Jones	4	0	4
5	MF	(The Gambia)	14	Sainey Nyassi	1	1	2
6	DF	(Northern Ireland)	5	Albert Watson	1	0	1
6	FW	(El Salvador)	6	Dustin Corea	1	0	1
6	MF	(Honduras)	7	Cristian Raudales	1	0	1
6	FW	(Canada)	9	Sadi Jalali	1	0	1
6	DF	(Trinidad and Tobago)	12	Kareem Moses	1	0	1
6	MF	(Canada)	19	Hanson Boakai	1	0	1
6	DF	(Canada)	22	Michael Nonni	1	0	1
Total					29	8	37
