= 2014 FC Edmonton season =

FC Edmonton
2014 season
- Owners: Dave Fath; Tom Fath
- Head Coach: Colin Miller
- Stadium: Clarke Stadium
- NASL: Spring: 9th Fall: 3rd Combined: 6th
- Canadian Championship: Semifinals
- Top goalscorer: League: Lance Laing (7 goals); All: Daryl Fordyce (8 goals)
- Highest home attendance: 4,399 (19 Apr v. New York)
- Lowest home attendance: League: 2,796 (31 Aug v. Minnesota) All: 1,946 (7 May v. Montreal)
- Average home league attendance: League: 3,384; All: 3,196
Home colours	Away colours

The 2014 FC Edmonton season was the club's fourth season in North American Soccer League, the second division of the Canadian soccer pyramid.

== Competitions ==
=== Pre-season and exhibitions ===
==== Pre-season ====
March 19, 2014 Preseason	Trinity Western Spartans	0 – 3	FC Edmonton	Langley, British Columbia
6:00 p.m. PST		Report	Jonke 5'; James 50'; Fordyce 57'	Stadium: Rogers Field

March 22, 2014 Preseason	Simon Fraser Clan	1 – 3	FC Edmonton	Burnaby, British Columbia
6:00 p.m. PST	74'	Report	Moses 21'; Jonke 26'; Watson (yellow card) 34'; Mortotsi (yellow card) 83'; Ameobi 88'	Stadium: Terry Fox Field

March 26, 2014 Preseason	UFV Cascades	0 – 4	FC Edmonton	Abbotsford, British Columbia
6:00 p.m. PST		Report	Fordyce 3'; Mortotsi 22'; Edward 34'; Ameobi 55'	Stadium: Bateman Park

March 29, 2014 Preseason	UBC Thunderbirds	1 – 1	FC Edmonton	Vancouver
6:00 p.m. PST	Cousens 35'	Report	Fordyce 54'	Stadium: Thunderbird Stadium

April 1, 2014 Preseason	Vancouver Whitecaps FC	4 – 2	FC Edmonton	Vancouver
6:00 p.m. PST	Fernández 4'; Manneh 10' 40'; Hurtado 17' (yellow card) 42'; Prasad (yellow card) 78'	Report	Ameobi 9' 26'; Blanco (yellow card) 55'; Jonke (yellow card) 89'	Stadium: Thunderbird Stadium

==== Exhibitions ====
June 29, 2014 Mid-Season Friendly	Kamloops Men's All-Stars	1 – 5	FC Edmonton	Kamloops, British Columbia
3:00 p.m. PST	Bowman 53'	Report	Jonke 1'; Hlavaty 24' (pen.); Mortotsi 57'; James 70'; Zebie 90'	Stadium: McArthur Island Park

July 2, 2014 Mid-Season Friendly	Victoria Highlanders	0 – 2	FC Edmonton	Victoria, British Columbia
6:00 p.m. PST		Report	Jalali 71'; Boakai 90'	Stadium: Centennial Stadium

July 6, 2014 Mid-Season Friendly	Seattle Sounders FC	0 – 2	FC Edmonton	Tukwila, Washington
6:00 p.m. PST		Report	Raudales 25'; James 85'	Stadium: Starfire Sports

August 26, 2014 Mid-Season Friendly	Alberta Golden Bears	0 – 2	FC Edmonton	Edmonton, Alberta
7:00 p.m. PST		Report	Jonke 57'; James 65'	Stadium: Foote Field

=== NASL Spring Season ===
The Spring season lasted for 9 games beginning on April 12 and ending on June 8. The schedule would feature a single round robin format with each team playing every other team in the league a single time. Half the teams would host 5 home games and play 4 road games whereas the other half of the teams would play 4 home games and 5 road games.

==== Standings ====
Pos	Team	Pld	W	D	L	GF	GA	GD	Pts	Qualification
1	Minnesota United (S)	9	6	2	1	16	9	+7	20	Playoffs
2	New York Cosmos	9	6	1	2	14	3	+11	19	
3	San Antonio Scorpions	9	5	2	2	13	9	+4	17	
4	Carolina RailHawks	9	4	2	3	11	15	−4	14	
5	Fort Lauderdale Strikers	9	4	1	4	18	18	0	13	
6	Ottawa Fury	9	3	1	5	14	13	+1	10	
7	Tampa Bay Rowdies	9	2	4	3	11	16	−5	10	
8	Atlanta Silverbacks	9	3	1	5	12	20	−8	10	
9	FC Edmonton	9	2	2	5	11	11	0	8	
10	Indy Eleven	9	0	4	5	14	20	−6	4	

Source: NASL Standings
(S) Spring season champion

==== Results ====
Overall								Home						Away					
Pld	W	D	L	GF	GA	GD	Pts	W	D	L	GF	GA	GD	W	D	L	GF	GA	GD
9	2	2	5	11	11	0	8	1	0	3	8	7	+1	1	2	2	3	4	−1

Last updated: 16 February 2014.
Source: http://www.nasl.com/standings/season/8945

===== Results by round =====
Round	1	2	3	4	5	6	7	8	9
Ground	A	H	A	H	A	A	H	A	H
Result	D	L	L	L	W	D	L	L	W
Position	4	8	10	10	9	9	9	9	9

Updated to match(es) played on 16 February 2014. Source: nasl.com
A = Away; H = Home; W = Win; D = Draw; L = Loss

All times listed using Mountain Time Zone.

April 12 NASL 1	FC Edmonton	1–1	Tampa Bay Rowdies	St. Petersburg, Florida
5:30PM MST	Watson (yellow card) 62'; Fordyce (yellow card) 64'; Hlavaty (yellow card) 86'; Ameobi (Jones) 88'; Laing (yellow card) 90'	report	Russell (yellow card) 18'; Moses 32' (o.g.); Shriver (yellow card) 77'; Hristov (yellow card) 87'	Stadium: Al Lang Stadium; Attendance: 7,003; Referee: Sorin Stoica

April 19 NASL 2	New York Cosmos	1–0	FC Edmonton	Edmonton, Alberta
7:00PM MST	Díaz (yellow card) 28'; Guenzatti (Stokkelien) 37'; Maurer (yellow card) 90+4'	report	Nonni (yellow card) 30'; Jones (yellow card) 34'	Stadium: Clarke Stadium; Attendance: 4,399; Referee: Mathieu Boudreau

April 26 NASL 3	FC Edmonton	0–1	Minnesota United FC	Blaine, Minnesota
6:00PM MST	Nonni (yellow card) 18'; Moses (yellow card) 20'; Aleksic (yellow card) 88'	report	Calvano (yellow card) 4'; Bracalello 70' (pen.)	Stadium: National Sports Center; Attendance: 5,287; Referee: Younes Marrakchi

May 3 NASL 4	Fort Lauderdale Strikers	3–1	FC Edmonton	Edmonton, Alberta
7:00PM MST	Nurse (yellow card) 26'; Antonijevic (yellow card) 36'; Núñez (Picault) 40'; Picault (King) 63'; Chavez (yellow card) 72'; Anderson 79' (pen.)	report	Jones (yellow card) 32'; Fordyce (Ameobi) 73'; Watson (red card) 78'	Stadium: Clarke Stadium; Attendance: 3,276; Referee: Alain Ruch

May 10 NASL 5	FC Edmonton	2–1	Indy Eleven	Indianapolis
7:30PM MST	Banner (yellow card) 10'; Fordyce 24'; Moses (Jones) 26'; Hlavaty (yellow card) 57'; Laing (yellow card) 67'; Edward (yellow card) 84'	report	Ring (yellow card) 12'; Roberts 29' (o.g.); Ambersley (yellow card) 61'; Hyland (yellow card) 81'; Norales (yellow card) 84'	Stadium: IU Michael A. Carroll Track & Soccer Stadium; Attendance: 10,285; Referee: Sorin Stoica

May 17 NASL 6	FC Edmonton	0–0	San Antonio Scorpions	San Antonio, Texas
6:30PM MST	Laing (yellow card) 13'; Roberts (red card) 27'; Edward (yellow card) 48'; Jones (yellow card) 90+3'	report	Menjivar (yellow card) 33'; Borrajo (yellow card) 45+1'; Hassli (yellow card) 90'; Restrepo (yellow card) 90+3'	Stadium: Toyota Field; Attendance: 7,087; Referee: Juan Guzman

May 24 NASL 7	Atlanta Silverbacks	2–1	FC Edmonton	Edmonton, Alberta
7:00PM MST	Randolph (yellow card) 38'; Chavez 49'; Canovas (yellow card) 73'; Poku (Randolph) 80'; Carillo (yellow card) 90+4'	report	James (Laing) 75'	Stadium: Clarke Stadium; Attendance: 2,961; Referee: Robert Schaap

May 31 NASL 8	FC Edmonton	0–1	Ottawa Fury FC	Ottawa, Ontario
5:00PM MST	Edward (yellow card) 63'; James (yellow card) 77'; Moses (yellow card) 79'	report	Minatel (yellow card) 59'; Maykon (yellow card) 80'; Heinemann 90'	Stadium: Harris Stadium; Attendance: 3,207; Referee: Alexis Vaughan

June 8 NASL 9	Carolina Railhawks	1–6	FC Edmonton	Edmonton, Alberta
2:00PM MST	Grella (yellow card) 31'; Au. King (yellow card) 64'; Tobin (Grella) 74'	report	Fordyce (Laing) 1'; Ameobi (Hlavaty) 13'; Laing (Hlavaty) 31'; Fordyce 44'; Fordyce (Edward) 75'; Jalali 90' (pen.)	Stadium: Clarke Stadium; Attendance: 3,641; Referee: Francis Latulippe

=== NASL Fall Season ===
The Fall season will last for 18 games beginning on July 12 and ending on November 1. The schedule will feature a double round robin format with each team playing every other team in the league twice, one at home and one on the road. The winner of the Fall season will play the winner of the Spring season in the Soccer Bowl 2014 Championship game except if the Spring and Fall Champions are the same team in which case the team with the best overall Spring and Fall record behind that team will be their opponent.

==== Standings ====
Pos	Team	Pld	W	D	L	GF	GA	GD	Pts	Qualification
1	San Antonio Scorpions (F)	18	11	2	5	30	15	+15	35	Playoffs
2	Minnesota United	18	10	5	3	31	19	+12	35	
3	FC Edmonton	18	8	5	5	23	18	+5	29	
4	Fort Lauderdale Strikers	18	7	6	5	20	21	−1	27	
5	Carolina RailHawks	18	7	3	8	27	28	−1	24	
6	New York Cosmos	18	5	8	5	23	24	−1	23	
7	Indy Eleven	18	6	5	7	21	26	−5	23	
8	Tampa Bay Rowdies	18	5	5	8	25	34	−9	20	
9	Ottawa Fury	18	4	5	9	20	25	−5	17	
10	Atlanta Silverbacks	18	3	4	11	20	30	−10	13	

Source: NASL Standings
(F) Fall season champion

==== Results ====
Overall								Home						Away					
Pld	W	D	L	GF	GA	GD	Pts	W	D	L	GF	GA	GD	W	D	L	GF	GA	GD
18	8	5	5	23	18	+5	29	6	2	1	14	6	+8	2	3	4	9	12	−3

Last updated: 2 November 2014.

===== Results by round =====
Round	1	2	3	4	5	6	7	8	9	10	11	12	13	14	15	16	17	18
Ground	H	A	H	H	A	A	A	H	H	A	A	H	H	A	H	A	A	H
Result	D	L	L	W	D	L	W	W	W	L	D	W	D	D	W	W	L	W
Position	5	7	8	7	7	9	6	4	4	4	5	3	4	3	3	3	3	3

Updated to match(es) played on 2 November 2014. Source: Fall season 2014 results
A = Away; H = Home; W = Win; D = Draw; L = Loss

July 13 NASL 1	Ottawa Fury FC	0–0	FC Edmonton	Edmonton, Alberta
4:00PM MST	Richter (yellow card) 7'; Ryan (yellow card) 14'; Richter (yellow card) 57' (red card); Jarun (yellow card) 83'	Report	Raudales (yellow card) 30'	Stadium: Commonwealth Stadium; Attendance: 3,609; Referee: Yusri Rudolf

July 19 NASL 2	FC Edmonton	0–1	Atlanta Silverbacks	Atlanta
5:30PM MST	Moses (yellow card) 42'; Jonke (yellow card) 47'; Raudales (yellow card) 54'; Watson (yellow card) 74'	Report	Gavin (yellow card) 72'; Cruz 75'; Cruz (yellow card) 76'; Chavez (yellow card) 87'	Stadium: Atlanta Silverbacks Park; Attendance: 3,011; Referee: Marcos de Oliveira

July 27 NASL 3	Indy Eleven	1–0	FC Edmonton	Edmonton, Alberta
2:00PM MST	Kléberson 90'	Report		Stadium: Clarke Stadium; Attendance: 3,152; Referee: Chris Grabas

August 3 NASL 4	San Antonio Scorpions	1–3	FC Edmonton	Edmonton, Alberta
2:00PM MST	Hassli 23' (pen.); Hassli (yellow card) 45'; Barrera (yellow card) 79'; Restrepo (yellow card) 81'	Report	James (Laing) 9'; Blanco (yellow card) 45'; Ameobi (Laing) 69'; Jonke (yellow card) 70'; Fordyce (Blanco) 79'; Edward (yellow card) 87'	Stadium: Clarke Stadium; Attendance: 2,849; Referee: David Barrie

August 6 NASL 5	FC Edmonton	0–0	New York Cosmos	Hempstead, New York
5:30PM MST	Fordyce (yellow card) 42'; Laing (yellow card) 45'; Ameobi (red card) 78'; Hlavaty (yellow card) 81'; Watson (yellow card) 83'; Jonke (yellow card) 90+3'	Report	Freeman (yellow card) 49'	Stadium: James M. Shuart Stadium; Attendance: 4,524; Referee: Robert Sibiga

August 9 NASL 6	FC Edmonton	2–3	Minnesota United FC	Blaine, Minnesota
6:00PM MST	Laing 4'; Moses (yellow card) 45+1'; Edward (yellow card) 61'; Hlavaty 81' (pen.)	Report	Ramirez 15' (pen.); Mendes (Davis) 48'; Mendes (Ibarra) 59'; Calvano (yellow card) 71'; Hildebrandt (red card) 78'	Stadium: National Sports Center; Attendance: 5,112; Referee: Mathieu Bourdeau

August 16 NASL 7	FC Edmonton	3–2	Carolina RailHawks	Cary, North Carolina
5:30PM MST	Laing (Burt) 53'; Nonni (yellow card) 61'; Jones (Nonni) 64'; Edward (yellow card) 73'; Navarro (yellow card) 76'; Hlavaty 90+5' (pen.)	Report	Schilawski (Graye) 12'; Schilawski 75' (pen.)	Stadium: WakeMed Soccer Park; Attendance: 4,666; Referee: Chris Penso

August 24 NASL 8	Fort Lauderdale Strikers	1–2	FC Edmonton	Edmonton, Alberta
2:00PM MST	Pecka (yellow card) 6'; Anderson (yellow card) 12'; Alves (yellow card) 27'; Nurse (yellow card) 76'; Hassan 86' (pen.)	Report	Raudales (yellow card) 6'; Nonni (yellow card) 25'; Jones (Laing) 33'; Burt (yellow card) 39'; Ameobi (yellow card) 45'; Laing (Burt) 72'; Hlavaty (yellow card) 84'; Edward (yellow card) 86'; Jonke (yellow card) 90+3'; Hlavaty (yellow card) 90+4' (red card)	Stadium: Clarke Stadium; Attendance: 3,111; Referee: Sheena Dickson

August 31 NASL 9	Minnesota United FC	1–2	FC Edmonton	Edmonton, Alberta
2:00PM MST	Mendes 80'; Venegas (yellow card) 82'	Report	Burt (Ameobi) 65'; Laing (Boakai) 71'	Stadium: Clarke Stadium; Attendance: 2,796; Referee: Alain Ruch

September 6 NASL 10	FC Edmonton	0–3	San Antonio Scorpions	San Antonio, Texas
6:30PM MST	Edward (red card) 65'; Raudales (red card) 70'; Navarro (yellow card) 90+1'	Report	DeRoux (yellow card) 23'; Castillo (Elizondo) 37'; James (yellow card) 64'; Zahorski (yellow card) 80'; Billy Forbes 82'; Caesar (Castillo) 90+5'	Stadium: Toyota Field; Attendance: 5,594; Referee: Sorin Stoica

September 13 NASL 11	FC Edmonton	1–1	Indy Eleven	Indianapolis
5:30PM MST	Hlavaty 25'; Watson (yellow card) 79'	Report	Pineda 16'; Frías (yellow card) 70'; Kléberson (yellow card) 82'	Stadium: IU Michael A. Carroll Track & Soccer Stadium; Attendance: 10,567; Referee: Marcos DeOliveira

September 21 NASL 12	Tampa Bay Rowdies	0–1	FC Edmonton	Edmonton, Alberta
2:00PM MST		Report	Laing (Hlavaty) 64'	Stadium: Clarke Stadium; Attendance: 4,392; Referee: David Barrie

September 28 NASL 13	New York Cosmos	1–1	FC Edmonton	Edmonton, Alberta
2:00PM MST	Lade (yellow card) 27'; Szetela (Stokkelien) 51'; Stokkelien (yellow card) 56'	Report	Burt (yellow card) 57'; Ameobi (James) 62'; Hlavaty (yellow card) 74'; Moses (yellow card) 90'	Stadium: Clarke Stadium; Attendance: 3,830; Referee: Robert Schaap

October 4 NASL 14	FC Edmonton	1–1	Tampa Bay Rowdies	St. Petersburg, Florida
5:30PM MST	Burt 43'; Edward (yellow card) 63'; Edward (yellow card) 90+1' (red card)	Report	Pickens (yellow card) 63'; Russell (yellow card) 63'; Hristov 68' (pen.)	Stadium: Al Lang Stadium; Attendance: 4,313; Referee: Ted Unkel

October 12 NASL 15	Carolina RailHawks	0–3	FC Edmonton	Edmonton, Alberta
2:00PM MST	Shipalane (yellow card) 55'; Scott (yellow card) 57'; Albadawi (yellow card) 84'	Report	Roberts 5'; Jones (James) 16'; Ameobi 51'; Jones (yellow card) 64'	Stadium: Clarke Stadium; Attendance: 2,903; Referee: Dave Gantar

October 18 NASL 16	FC Edmonton	2–0	Ottawa Fury FC	Ottawa, Ontario
1:00PM MST	Burt (Laing) 9'; Laing 20'; Smits (yellow card) 88'; Raudales (yellow card) 90'	Report	Dantas (yellow card) 74'	Stadium: TD Place Stadium; Attendance: 3,935; Referee: Robert Schaap

October 25 NASL 17	FC Edmonton	0–1	Fort Lauderdale Strikers	Fort Lauderdale, Florida
5:30PM MST	Jones (yellow card) 6'; James (yellow card) 45+1'; Hlavaty (yellow card) 75'	Report	Čontofalský (yellow card) 50'; Marcelin (yellow card) 72'; Pecka 83'	Stadium: Lockhart Stadium; Attendance: 5,756; Referee: Robert Sibiga

November 2 NASL 18	Atlanta Silverbacks	1–2	FC Edmonton	Edmonton, Alberta
2:00PM MST	S. Bangura 71'	Report	Ameobi (Edward) 17'; Nonni (Fordyce) 34'	Stadium: Clarke Stadium; Attendance: 3,085; Referee: Yusri Rudolf

=== Canadian Championship ===
==== Preliminary round ====
April 23 First leg	Ottawa Fury FC	0–0	FC Edmonton	Ottawa, Ontario
5:30PM MST	Beckie (yellow card) 33'; Dantas (yellow card) 51'; Davies (yellow card) 70'; Mayard (yellow card) 80'	report	Edward (yellow card) 28'; Ameobi (yellow card) 72'	Stadium: Harris Stadium; Attendance: 2,411; Referee: Geoff Gamble

April 30 Second leg	FC Edmonton	3–1	Ottawa Fury FC	Edmonton, Alberta
7:30PM MST	Edward (yellow card) 24'; Fordyce (Boakai) 30'; Jones (yellow card) 34'; Boakai 48'; Fordyce (yellow card) 61'; Fordyce (Boakai) 62'	report	Ryan (yellow card) 40'; Dantas (Ubiparipović) 90'	Stadium: Clarke Stadium; Attendance: 2,001; Referee: Drew Fischer

==== Semifinals ====
May 7 First leg	FC Edmonton	2–1	Montreal Impact	Edmonton, Alberta
7:30PM MST	Jones (yellow card) 45'; Moses (yellow card) 56'; Ameobi (Boakai) 60'; Nonni 90+1'	report	Camara (yellow card) 41'; McInerney (Bernier) 56'; Pearce (yellow card) 82'	Stadium: Clarke Stadium; Attendance: 1,946; Referee: Silviu Petrescu

May 14 Second leg	Montreal Impact	4–2	FC Edmonton	Montreal
5:30PM MST	McInerney (Mapp) 10'; McInerney (Mapp) 17'; Brovsky (Bernardello) 47'; Bernier 90+5' (pen.)	report	Edward (yellow card) 45+3'; Jonke (Boakai) 67'; Jonke 70' (pen.); Boakai (yellow card) 79'; Hlavaty (yellow card) 90+5'	Stadium: Saputo Stadium; Attendance: 12,826; Referee: Drew Fischer

== Player details ==
List of squad players, including number of appearances by competition

No.	Pos	Nat	Player	Total		North American Soccer League		Canadian Championship	
No.	Pos	Nat	Player	Apps	Goals	Apps	Goals	Apps	Goals
1	GK	(United States) USA	Lance Parker	6	0	6+0	0	0+0	0
2	MF	(United States) USA	Mike Banner	4	0	2+0	0	1+1	0
3	DF	(Canada) CAN	Edson Edward	27	0	21+3	0	2+1	0
4	MF	(United States) USA	Neil Hlavaty	30	3	21+5	3	4+0	0
5	DF	(Northern Ireland) NIR	Albert Watson	30	0	26+0	0	4+0	0
6	MF	(Canada) CAN	Edem Mortotsi	3	0	1+1	0	0+1	0
7	MF	(Jamaica) JAM	Horace James	30	2	16+11	2	1+2	0
8	MF	(England) ENG	Ritchie Jones	25	3	17+5	3	3+0	0
9	FW	(Canada) CAN	Sadi Jalali	3	1	1+2	1	0+0	0
10	MF	(United States) USA	Milton Blanco	9	0	6+3	0	0+0	0
11	MF	(Canada) CAN	Massimo Mirabelli	7	0	0+5	0	0+2	0
12	DF	(Trinidad and Tobago) TTO	Kareem Moses	29	1	25+1	1	3+0	0
13	FW	(Canada) CAN	Frank Jonke	21	2	9+8	0	3+1	2
14	MF	(Honduras) HON	Cristian Raudales	13	0	10+3	0	0+0	0
15	DF	(Canada) CAN	Mallan Roberts	14	1	12+0	1	2+0	0
16	FW	(Northern Ireland) NIR	Daryl Fordyce	24	8	14+6	6	4+0	2
17	MF	(Jamaica) JAM	Lance Laing	31	7	27+0	7	4+0	0
18	FW	(England) ENG	Tomi Ameobi	26	7	20+3	6	3+0	1
19	MF	(Canada) CAN	Hanson Boakai	19	1	2+13	0	4+0	1
20	MF	(United States) USA	Chad Burt	12	3	11+1	3	0+0	0
21	GK	(Canada) CAN	Justin Farago	1	0	1+0	0	0+0	0
22	DF	(Canada) CAN	Michael Nonni	23	2	11+8	1	1+3	1
23	GK	(Canada) CAN	John Smits	24	0	20+0	0	4+0	0
24	DF	(United States) USA	Beto Navarro	18	0	18+0	0	0+0	0
25	DF	(Canada) CAN	Marko Aleksic	2	0	0+1	0	1+0	0

== Transfers ==
=== In ===
No.	Pos.	Player	Transferred from	Fee/notes	Date	Source
13	FW	(Canada) Frank Jonke	(Finland) FF Jaro	Free Transfer	November 20, 2013	
21	GK	(Canada) Tyson Farago	(Canada) WSA Winnipeg	Free Transfer	December 4, 2013	
10	MF	(United States) Milton Blanco	(United States) Atlanta Silverbacks	Free Transfer	December 10, 2013	
8	MF	(England) Ritchie Jones	(England) Grimsby Town FC	Free Transfer	January 15, 2013	
2	MF	(United States) Mike Banner	(Finland) FF Jaro	Free Transfer	January 15, 2013	
12	DF	(Trinidad and Tobago) Kareem Moses	(Trinidad and Tobago) North East Stars F.C.		January 23, 2014	
25	DF	(Canada) Marko Aleksic	(Canada) FC Edmonton Academy	Academy signing	February 5, 2014	
7	MF	(Jamaica) Horace James	(United States) Atlanta Silverbacks	Free Transfer	March 14, 2014	
18	FW	(England) Tomi Ameobi	(Finland) VPS	Free Transfer	March 31, 2014	
	MF	(Honduras) Cristian Raudales	Unattached		July 9, 2014	
	MF	(United States) Chad Burt	Unattached		July 11, 2014	

=== Out ===
No.	Pos.	Player	Transferred to	Fee/notes	Date	Source
	GK	(Canada) Norbert Janas		Free Agent	November 5, 2013	
	DF	(Canada) Chris de Guise	(Canada) CS Longueuil	Free Agent	November 5, 2013	
	MF	(Canada) Shaun Saiko	(United States) San Antonio Scorpions	Free Agent	November 5, 2013	
	MF	(Guyana) Chris Nurse	(United States) Fort Lauderdale Strikers	Free Agent	November 5, 2013	
	MF	(Northern Ireland) Robert Garrett	(Northern Ireland) Linfield FC	Loan Return	November 5, 2013	
	FW	(Canada) Anthony Adur		Free Agent	November 5, 2013	
	FW	(Canada) Michael Cox	(Finland) KuPS	Free Agent	November 5, 2013	
	FW	(United States) Corey Hertzog	(Canada) Vancouver Whitecaps FC	Loan Return	November 5, 2013	
	DF	(Canada) Antonio Rago		Free Agent	November 7, 2013	
	DF	(Scotland) David Proctor	(Scotland) Airdrieonians F.C.	Free Agent	November 15, 2013	
	MF	(United States) Wes Knight		Free Agent	November 15, 2013	
