= Tyson Farago =

Canadian soccer player

Personal information
- Full name: Tyson James Farago
- Date of birth: May 1, 1991 (age 35)
- Place of birth: Winnipeg, Canada
- Height: 1.85 m (6 ft 1 in)
- Position: Goalkeeper

Youth career
- 2008: SC Hellas
- 2008–2009: Goiás
- 2009: Winnipeg Lucania
- 2011: Winnipeg Juventus

College career
Years	Team	Apps	(Gls)
2012–2014	Winnipeg Wesmen		

Senior career*
Years	Team	Apps	(Gls)
2013	WSA Winnipeg	14	(0)
2014–2017	FC Edmonton	22	(0)
2018	St Patrick's Athletic	3	(0)
2018	WSA Winnipeg	0	(0)
2019	Valour FC	16	(0)
2021–2022	Cavalry FC	4	(0)
Total		59	(0)
- * Club domestic league appearances and goals

Tyson James Farago (born May 1, 1991) is a Canadian former professional soccer player who played as a goalkeeper. Starting his senior career at the club while at university, he joined FC Edmonton a year later and spent four seasons with the Alberta club. He signed for Irish club St Patrick's Athletic in March 2018, and returned to WSA Winnipeg after four months overseas. He then had two stints in the new Canadian Premier League, first with Valour FC of Winnipeg, then with Cavalry FC of Calgary.

== Club career ==
=== Early career ===
Farago represented the Manitoba provincial team between 2004 and 2010, and won a gold medal at the 2007 Western Canada Summer Games. He was also named in the All-Star Team at the 2009 Canada Games.

He joined Manitoba Major Soccer League club SC Hellas as starting goalkeeper for the 2008 season and won the Manitoba Soccer Association Cup. He was also awarded MVP honours aged 17. Later that year, he joined Brazilian club Goias Esporte Clube for a season before returning home to join Winnipeg Lucania.

In July 2010, he was one of four Canadians to trial with Southern League Premier Division club Truro City in England. He spent most of the season training with League One club Brighton & Hove Albion and playing trial games for the reserve team.

Farago won the Manitoba Soccer Association Cup and MVP honours for a second time with Winnipeg Juventus in 2011. Between 2012 and 2014, he represented the University of Winnipeg soccer team the Winnipeg Wesmen. He was awarded the Manitoba Soccer Frank Capasso Award of Merit in 2013.

=== WSA Winnipeg ===
and joined Premier Development League side WSA Winnipeg for the 2013 season. Playing in every match of the season, Farago led the league in saves and saves per game despite his team finishing bottom of the Central Conference Heartland Division. As a result, he was named as goalkeeper in the All-Conference Team making 106 saves in 14 games.

=== FC Edmonton ===
In November 2013, Farago was rewarded for his recent form and signed a one-year professional deal with North American Soccer League club FC Edmonton. Spending the 2014 season as third-choice goalkeeper behind John Smits and Lance Parker, he made his debut on November 2, the final day of the season, in a 2–1 victory against the Atlanta Silverbacks. His performance led to a NASL Team of the Week nomination, alongside teammates Tomi Ameobi and Michael Nonni.

Farago began the 2015 season as third-choice goalkeeper again, but by the end of the year was acting as backup to Matt Van Oekel. He made five appearances across the 2015 and 2016 seasons, and fell to third-choice again for the 2017 season after the arrivals of Chris Konopka and Nathan Ingham. However, he went on to make 16 appearances and ended the season as Colin Miller's first-choice goalkeeper. He left the club after four seasons when FC Edmonton ceased operations in November 2017.

=== St Patrick's Athletic ===
On March 22, 2018, Farago joined League of Ireland Premier Division club St Patrick's Athletic on the recommendation of former Edmonton teammate Jake Keegan. Acting as backup to Barry Murphy, he made his debut on April 9 in a League of Ireland Cup tie at home to Dundalk. The match ended in a 4–4 draw after extra time, and St Patrick's Athletic went on to lose 8–7 in a penalty shootout. Farago made his league debut seven days later as a half-time substitution for the injured Murphy. He kept a clean sheet in the 1–0 win against Waterford. In July 2018, Farago left the club to return to Canada.

=== Return to WSA Winnipeg ===
On July 8, 2018, Farago returned to Premier Development League club WSA Winnipeg for the remainder of the 2018 season.

=== Valour FC ===
Farago signed for Valour FC of the Canadian Premier League on December 14, 2018. For the 2019 Canadian Premier League season, Farago split the goalkeeping duties at Valour with Mathias Janssens, with both of them starting 5 games in Valour’s first 10 games. Valour ended up finishing in last place in the spring season. On July 17, 2019 Farago earned his first clean sheet for Valour in a 0-0 draw with FC Edmonton, his former club.

In June 2020 Valour confirmed Farago would not be returning to the club for the upcoming season.

=== Cavalry FC ===
After a year out of the game, Farago signed with Cavalry FC on January 21, 2021. Serving as backup to Marco Carducci, he made five appearances that season, four of which were clean sheets. In January 2022, it was announced Farago would return for the 2022 season, his second with the club. However, a car accident in the offseason rendered him unable to continue playing, and in August 2022, he retired from professional soccer.

== International career ==
In April 2010, Farago was named in the Canada U20 team that competed at the 2010 COTIF Tournament. He received his first call up to the Canada national team in January 2016.

== Career statistics ==
As of November 16, 2021

Club	Season	League			National Cup (Note: Includes the Canadian Championship.)		League Cup (Note: Includes the League of Ireland Cup.)		Other		Total	
Club	Season	Division	Apps	Goals	Apps	Goals	Apps	Goals	Apps	Goals	Apps	Goals
WSA Winnipeg	2013	USL PDL	14	0	–		–		0	0	14	0
FC Edmonton	2014	NASL	1	0	0	0	–		0	0	1	0
FC Edmonton	2015	NASL	2	0	0	0	–		0	0	2	0
FC Edmonton	2016	NASL	3	0	0	0	–		0	0	3	0
FC Edmonton	2017	NASL	16	0	2	0	–		0	0	18	0
FC Edmonton	Total		22	0	0	0	–		0	0	24	0
St Patrick's Athletic	2018	LoI Premier Division	3	0	0	0	1	0	0	0	4	0
WSA Winnipeg	2018	USL PDL	0	0	–		–		0	0	0	0
Valour FC	2019	Canadian Premier League	16	0	1	0	–		0	0	17	0
Cavalry FC	2021	Canadian Premier League	4	0	1	0	–		0	0	5	0
Career total			59	0	4	0	1	0	0	0	64	0
