= Ameobi =

Ameobi is a surname. Notable people with the surname include:

- Sammy Ameobi (born 1992), English footballer
- Shola Ameobi (born 1981), Nigerian footballer
- Tomi Ameobi (born 1988), English footballer
