= Kareem Moses =

Trinidadian footballer (born 1990)

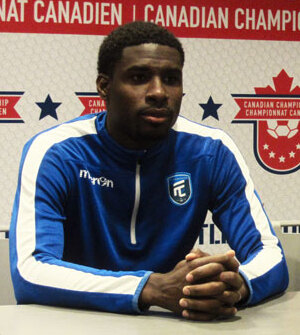
- Moses with FC Edmonton in 2019

Personal information
- Date of birth: 11 February 1990 (age 36)
- Place of birth: Morvant, Trinidad and Tobago
- Height: 1.85 m (6 ft 1 in)
- Position: Centre-back

Team information
- Current team: JBK

Senior career*
Years	Team	Apps	(Gls)
2009–2011	Joe Public		
2011–2012	St. Ann's Rangers		
2012–2014	North East Stars		
2014–2015	FC Edmonton	47	(2)
2016–2017	North Carolina FC	42	(1)
2018	Jaro	23	(3)
2019–2020	FC Edmonton	19	(0)
2021–2022	VPS	34	(2)
2023–2024	Jaro	33	(2)
2025–	JBK	0	(0)

International career^{‡}
2012–	Trinidad and Tobago	19	(2)
- * Club domestic league appearances and goals as of 20 October 2024 ‡ National team caps and goals as of 19:02, 21 November 2023 (UTC)

Kareem Moses (born 11 February 1990) is a Trinidadian professional footballer who plays as a centre-back for Finnish club JBK.

== Club career ==
=== Early career ===
Born in Morvant, Moses played for Joe Public, St. Ann's Rangers and North East Stars in the TT Pro League.

=== FC Edmonton ===
In 2014, Moses made his first move abroad, signing with North American Soccer League side FC Edmonton.

=== Carolina RailHawks ===
In 2016, Moses signed with the Carolina RailHawks. He was not retained by North Carolina FC for the 2018 season.

=== FF Jaro ===
On 8 April 2018, Moses signed a deal with Finnish Ykkönen side FF Jaro for the 2018 season. He made 23 appearances that season, scoring three goals.

=== Return to Edmonton ===
On 31 January 2019, Moses signed with FC Edmonton for a second spell. In his return season he made fifteen appearances, including eleven starts.

=== Return to Finland ===
On 4 February 2021, Moses signed with Finnish Ykkönen side VPS.

In January 2023, Moses returned to former club FF Jaro.

In January 2025, he signed for Finnish club JBK.

== International career ==
Moses earned six caps for Trinidad and Tobago between 2012 and 2013. He received a seventh cap in a World Cup qualifying match against Mexico in 2017.

== Playing style ==
Initially a central defender, he was moved to the fullback position when he signed for FC Edmonton.

== Personal life ==
On 2 October 2024, it was reported in the Finnish media that Moses had been given a three-month probationary prison sentence with fines by the Court of Ostrobothnia. He had unlawfully recorded, without the other person's consent, a video of him having sexual intercourse, with the incident having happened in Vaasa on 21 April 2021. Jaro had already earlier sidelined him from the club's operations. Moses appealed the Court's decision.

== Career statistics ==
As of 20 October 2024

Club statistics
Club	Season	League			National Cup (Note: Includes appearances in the Canadian Championship, U.S. Open Cup and Suomen Cup.)		Other		Total	
Club	Season	Division	Apps	Goals	Apps	Goals	Apps	Goals	Apps	Goals
FC Edmonton	2014	NASL	26	1	3	0	0	0	29	1
FC Edmonton	2015	NASL	21	1	3	0	0	0	24	1
FC Edmonton	Total		47	2	6	0	0	0	53	2
North Carolina FC	2016	NASL	23	1	0	0	0	0	23	1
North Carolina FC	2017	NASL	19	0	1	0	0	0	20	0
North Carolina FC	Total		42	1	1	0	0	0	43	1
Jaro	2018	Ykkönen	23	3	0	0	–		23	3
FC Edmonton	2019	Canadian Premier League	15	0	2	0	0	0	17	0
FC Edmonton	2020	Canadian Premier League	4	0	–		–		4	0
FC Edmonton	Total		19	0	2	0	0	0	21	0
VPS	2021	Ykkönen	17	2	4	0	–		21	2
VPS	2022	Veikkausliiga	17	0	3	1	3 (Note: Includes Finnish League Cup)	0	23	1
VPS	Total		34	2	7	1	3	0	44	3
Jaro	2023	Ykkönen	14	1	0	0	3 (Note: Includes Ykköscup)	0	17	1
Jaro	2024	Ykkösliiga	19	1	1	0	2 (Note: Includes Ykkösliigacup)	0	22	1
Jaro	Total		33	2	1	0	5	0	39	2
Career total			198	10	17	1	8	0	223	11

== Honours ==
Jaro

- Ykkösliiga runner-up: 2024
