= Eddie Edward =

Canadian soccer player

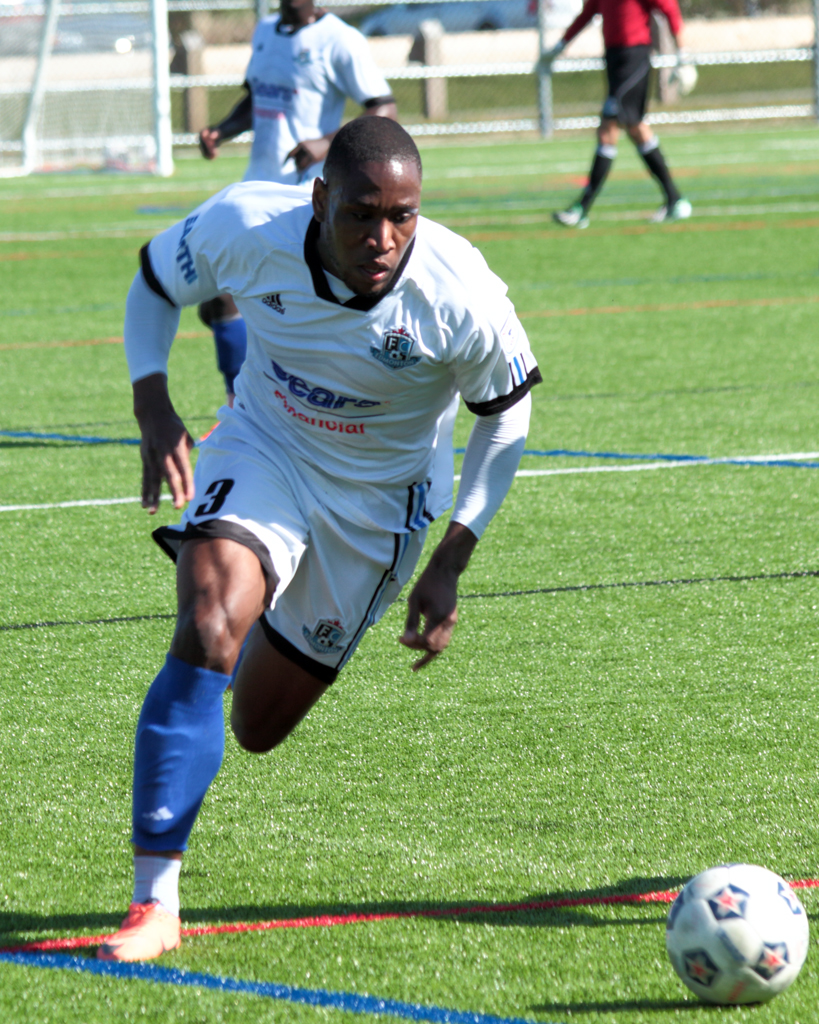

Personal information
- Full name: Giovanni Edson Edward
- Date of birth: September 20, 1988 (age 38)
- Place of birth: Ottawa, Ontario, Canada
- Height: 1.83 m (6 ft 0 in)
- Position: Defender

College career
| Years | Team | Apps | (Gls) |
| 2006–2009 | Graceland | 82 | (15) |

Senior career*
| Years | Team | Apps | (Gls) |
| 2007 | Ottawa Fury | 0 | (0) |
| 2008 | Des Moines Menace | 2 | (0) |
| 2009 | Kansas City Brass | 8 | (2) |
| 2009 | Ottawa Fury | 0 | (0) |
| 2010–2011 | FC Dallas | 1 | (0) |
| 2012 | Puerto Rico Islanders | 20 | (0) |
| 2013–2016 | FC Edmonton | 79 | (0) |
| 2016–2018 | Ottawa Fury | 71 | (2) |
| Total | | 181 | (4) |
- * Club domestic league appearances and goals as of October 13, 2018

Giovanni Edson "Eddie" Edward (born September 20, 1988) is a Canadian former soccer player who played as a defender.

== Career ==
=== Youth and college ===
Edward's amateur and collegiate soccer career allowed him to travel across North America. After graduating from the Ottawa Fury's Youth program, Edward began his collegiate duties at the NAIA's Graceland University. In his four years at Graceland, he helped the Jackets to an overall 58–16–8 record while scoring 15 goals and adding 13 assists. In 2006, Edward was part of Graceland's NAIA National Championship-winning squad, while in 2007, he helped the team become Region V and Conference Champions. Edward has also twice been named to the NAIA's Heart of America Athletic All-Conference team, in 2007 and 2008.

The Ottawa native is no stranger to the PDL, having traversed the amateur soccer ranks over the past three years with Ottawa Fury (2007, 2009) as well as with the Des Moines Menace in 2008 and Kansas City Brass in 2009. Edward has also featured for the Kansas City Wizards U19 squad where he led the team in goals helping them reach their first National finals appearance. Edward's ascention to the MLS professional ranks represents only the second-ever Fury player to achieve the feat after Tyler Hemming played for Toronto FC in 2007-2008.

=== FC Dallas ===
Edward signed for Major League Soccer club FC Dallas on March 25, 2010 after training with them during the pre-season. He made his professional debut in a US Open Cup qualifying match, but he had to wait until September 25 for his first MLS appearance, which came against Kansas City Wizards. Edward was waived by FC Dallas on November 23, 2011.

=== Puerto Rico Islanders ===
Edward signed with NASL club Puerto Rico Islanders on April 5, 2012.

=== FC Edmonton ===
After one season with the Islanders, Edward signed with Canadian NASL side FC Edmonton on December 4, 2012.

=== Ottawa Fury ===
In June 2016 Edward was released by FC Edmonton and signed with to his hometown club, Ottawa Fury FC, citing a need to be close to family. Edward was one of three Ottawa area players to sign with the Fury, the others being Maxim Tissot and Jamar Dixon. In November 2016, the Fury announced that they had re-signed Edward, and that he would stay with the club as it moved to the United Soccer League for the 2017 season. Edward trained with high performance coach Neil Miron at FTA Complex prior to 2018 season. In November 2017, the Fury announced Edward would remain with the club for the 2018 season.

== Career statistics ==
=== Club ===
As of October 13, 2018

| Club | League | Season | League | | Playoffs | | Domestic Cup | | CONCACAF | | Total | |
| Club | League | Season | Apps | Goals | Apps | Goals | Apps | Goals | Apps | Goals | Apps | Goals |
|---|---|---|---|---|---|---|---|---|---|---|---|---|
| FC Dallas | MLS | 2010 | 0 | 0 | 0 | 0 | 0 | 0 | 0 | 0 | 0 | 0 |
| FC Dallas | MLS | 2011 | 1 | 0 | 0 | 0 | 0 | 0 | 0 | 0 | 1 | 0 |
| FC Dallas | Total | | 1 | 0 | 0 | 0 | 0 | 0 | 0 | 0 | 1 | 0 |
| Puerto Rico Islanders | NASL | 2012 | 20 | 0 | 1 | 0 | 0 | 0 | 5 | 0 | 26 | 0 |
| Puerto Rico Islanders | Total | | 20 | 0 | 1 | 0 | 0 | 0 | 5 | 0 | 26 | 0 |
| FC Edmonton | NASL | 2013 | 20 | 0 | 0 | 0 | 2 | 0 | 0 | 0 | 22 | 0 |
| FC Edmonton | NASL | 2014 | 24 | 0 | 0 | 0 | 3 | 0 | 0 | 0 | 27 | 0 |
| FC Edmonton | NASL | 2015 | 26 | 0 | 0 | 0 | 4 | 0 | 0 | 0 | 29 | 0 |
| FC Edmonton | NASL | 2016 | 9 | 0 | 0 | 0 | 1 | 0 | 0 | 0 | 10 | 0 |
| FC Edmonton | Total | | 79 | 0 | 0 | 0 | 10 | 0 | 0 | 0 | 89 | 0 |
| Ottawa Fury | NASL | 2016 | 19 | 0 | 0 | 0 | 0 | 0 | 0 | 0 | 19 | 0 |
| Ottawa Fury | USL | 2017 | 23 | 2 | 0 | 0 | 4 | 0 | 0 | 0 | 27 | 2 |
| Ottawa Fury | USL | 2018 | 29 | 0 | 0 | 0 | 4 | 0 | 0 | 0 | 33 | 0 |
| Ottawa Fury | Total | | 71 | 2 | 0 | 0 | 8 | 0 | 0 | 0 | 79 | 2 |
| Career Total | | | 170 | 2 | 1 | 0 | 18 | 0 | 5 | 0 | 194 | 2 |
