= Mallan Roberts =

Sierra Leonean footballer

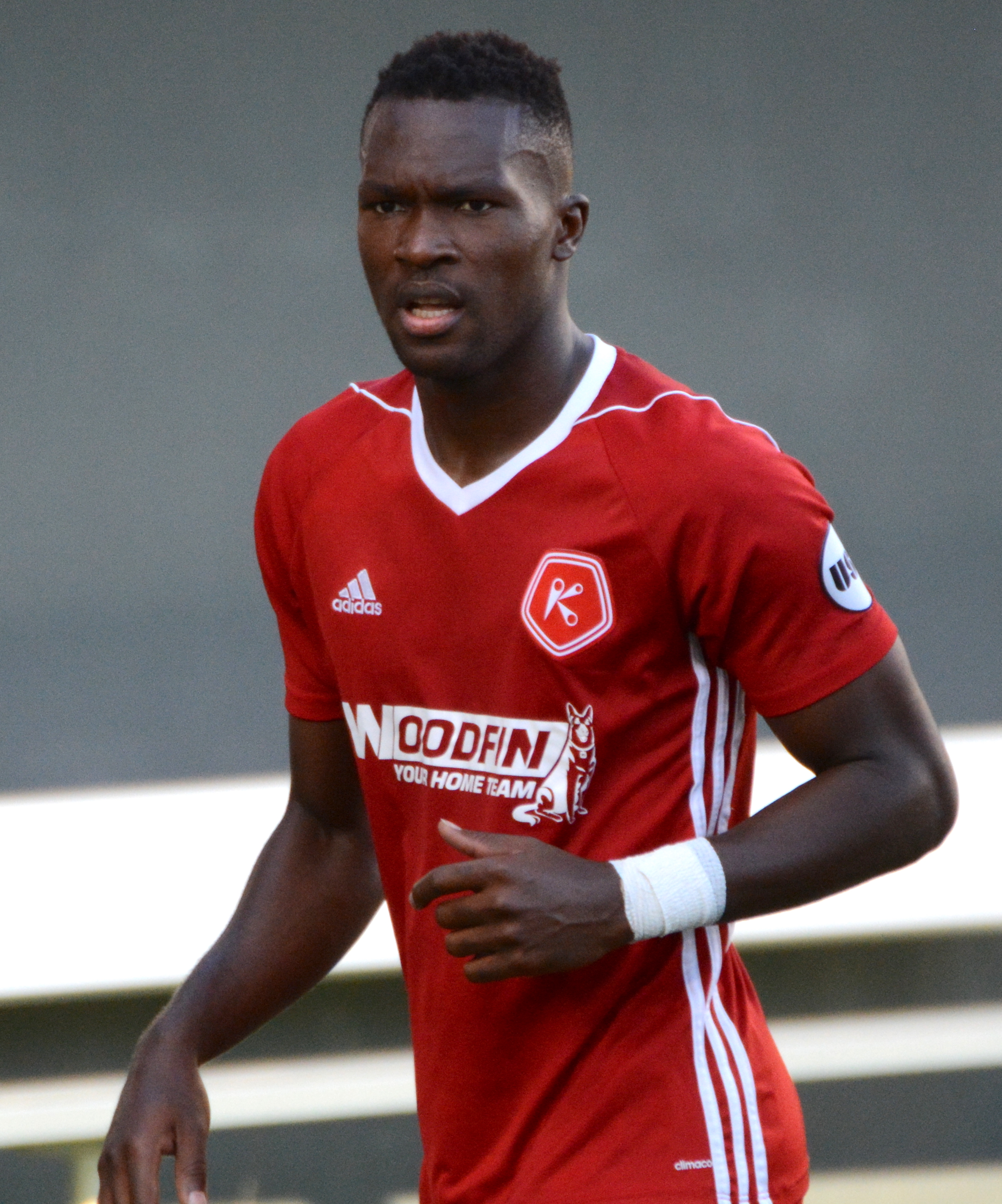
- Roberts with Richmond Kickers in 2017

Personal information
- Date of birth: 6 June 1992 (age 34)
- Place of birth: Freetown, Sierra Leone
- Height: 1.88 m (6 ft 2 in)
- Position: Centre back

Youth career
- 2012–2013: FC Edmonton

College career
Years	Team	Apps	(Gls)
2011	NAIT Ooks		

Senior career*
Years	Team	Apps	(Gls)
2013–2016	FC Edmonton	46	(3)
2016	→ Ottawa Fury (loan)	22	(1)
2017–2018	Richmond Kickers	43	(1)
2019	Tulsa Roughnecks	31	(0)
2021–2023	Heidelberg United	32	(1)

International career^{‡}
2015	Canada	1	(0)
- * Club domestic league appearances and goals as of August 26, 2022 ‡ National team caps and goals as of 16 June 2015

Mallan Roberts (born 6 June 1992) is a Canadian professional soccer player who plays as a centre back.

== Career ==
=== Youth ===
Born in Freetown, Sierra Leone, Roberts began playing soccer in Sierra Leone before continuing to play the game in Edmonton, Alberta after he and his father fled from Sierra Leone due to the Sierra Leone Civil War. While in high-school Roberts started to play Canadian football for his high-school side and then for the local Canadian Junior Football League side, the Edmonton Huskies. He also spent a few weeks training with Canadian Football League side, the Edmonton Eskimos before going back into soccer and playing with the Northern Alberta Institute of Technology soccer team before joining the FC Edmonton reserves in 2012.

=== FC Edmonton ===
On 20 February 2013 it was announced that Roberts had signed his first professional contract with FC Edmonton of the North American Soccer League. He then made his professional debut for FC Edmonton in a Canadian Championship match against the Vancouver Whitecaps FC in which started and played the full 90 minutes as Edmonton lost the match 2–3. Roberts then scored his first professional goal of his career on 30 June 2013 against Minnesota United FC in an NASL match in which he found the net in the 11th minute as FC Edmonton went on to win the match 3–1.

=== Ottawa Fury ===
On 4 June 2016 Ottawa Fury FC announced it had acquired Roberts on loan to provide depth in the absence of defenders Kyle Venter and Rich Balchan due to injury. In December 2016, the Fury announced that Roberts would not return to the team as the club moved to USL in 2017.

=== Richmond Kickers ===
After 4 seasons in Edmonton, Roberts signed with Richmond Kickers of the United Soccer League in February 2017.

=== Tulsa Roughnecks ===
On January 4, 2019, Roberts joined USL Championship side FC Tulsa.

== International ==
Roberts had said he was open to representing either Sierra Leone or Canada.

=== Sierra Leone ===
Sierra Leone attempted to call up Roberts twice in 2014 for Africa Cup of Nations qualifying, but due to the Ebola Epidemic in West Africa, and coaching issues with the team, he was unable to join the squad.

=== Canada ===
Roberts was expecting to gain Canadian citizenship sometime during the summer of 2013. Roberts finally received his Canadian citizenship on February 12, 2015. On June 6, 2015, Roberts received his first call up from Canada coach Benito Floro to the senior squad for two 2018 FIFA World Cup qualification matches against Dominica as a replacement for an injured Dejan Jaković. He made his debut in the return leg against Dominica as a late substitute on June 16 and as a result, became cap-tied to Canada.

== Career statistics ==
=== Club ===
As of August 26, 2022

Club	League	Season	League		League Cup		Domestic Cup		Total	
Club	League	Season	Apps	Goals	Apps	Goals	Apps	Goals	Apps	Goals
FC Edmonton	NASL	2013	11	1	0	0	2	0	13	1
FC Edmonton	NASL	2014	12	1	0	0	2	0	14	1
FC Edmonton	NASL	2015	21	1	0	0	4	0	25	2
FC Edmonton	NASL	2016	2	0	0	0	0	0	2	0
FC Edmonton	Total		46	3	0	0	8	0	54	3
Ottawa Fury (loan)	NASL	2016	22	1	0	0	0	0	22	1
Richmond Kickers	USL	2017	30	1	0	0	0	0	30	1
Richmond Kickers	USL	2018	13	0	0	0	0	0	13	0
Richmond Kickers	Total		43	1	0	0	0	0	43	1
Tulsa Roughnecks	USL	2019	31	0	0	0	0	0	31	0
Heidelberg United	NPL Victoria	2021	15	0	0	0	0	0	15	0
Heidelberg United	NPL Victoria	2022	17	1	0	0	1	0	18	1
Heidelberg United	Total		32	1	0	0	1	0	33	1
Career Total			174	6	0	0	9	0	184	6

=== International ===
As of June 16, 2015

Canada national team
2015	1	0
Total	1	0
