= Johann Smith =

American soccer player (born 1987)

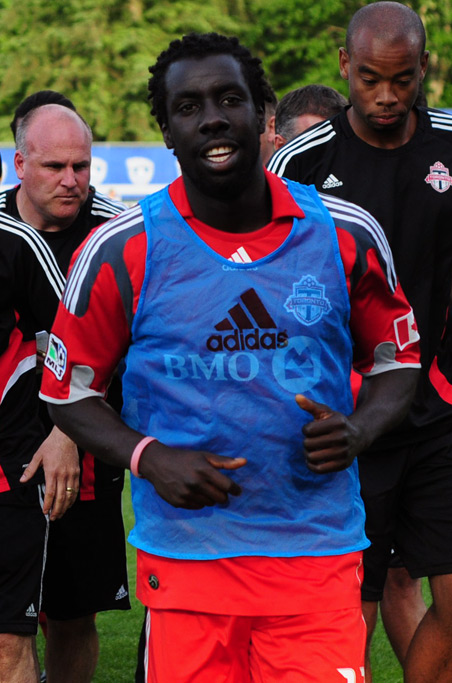

Personal information
- Full name: Johann Anwar Ryan Smith
- Date of birth: April 25, 1987 (age 39)
- Place of birth: Hartford, Connecticut, U.S.
- Height: 5 ft 11 in (1.80 m)
- Positions: Forward; winger; left back

Youth career
- Oakwood SC
- Bolton Wanderers

Senior career*
Years	Team	Apps	(Gls)
2006–2008	Bolton Wanderers	1	(0)
2007	→ Carlisle United (loan)	14	(1)
2007	→ Darlington (loan)	3	(0)
2008	→ Stockport County (loan)	2	(0)
2008–2009	Toronto FC	14	(0)
2009–2010	Rijeka	5	(0)
2010	Kalmar FF	2	(0)
2012	KuPS	4	(0)
2014	Adelaide Raiders	5	(0)
2014	Cumberland United	8	(4)
2015–2016	FC Edmonton	35	(0)
Total		93	(5)

International career
2006–2007	United States U-20	5	(4)
- * Club domestic league appearances and goals

Johann Anwar Ryan Smith (born April 25, 1987) is an American former soccer player who played as a forward, winger, and left back.

== Career ==
=== Youth ===
Smith grew up in Bloomfield, Connecticut and attended Watkinson School in nearby Hartford, where he played varsity soccer for four years, garnering All-State honors during his junior and senior campaigns. In addition, Smith also enjoyed success on the school's track and field team, once running the 100 meters in 10.5 seconds. Smith also played club soccer for Oakwood Soccer Club. He went on trial during Bolton Wanderers preseason training and impressed by what they saw, Smith was offered a three-year scholarship contract with Bolton's youth academy.

=== Professional ===
Smith was named as a Bolton substitute for games against Tottenham Hotspur and Charlton Athletic during the early part of the 2006-07 season. He made his first team debut for Bolton in their League Cup defeat at Charlton Athletic in October 2006, and made his Premier League debut against Manchester United on October 28, 2006, as an 85th-minute substitute for Kevin Davies.

Smith joined Carlisle United on loan in January 2007, making his debut against Doncaster Rovers as a 63rd-minute substitute, replacing Kevin Gall. He scored his first professional goal on April 29, 2007, against Swansea City.

Following his injury playing internationally for the United States, Smith missed all of Bolton's 2007 pre-season, including the Peace Cup in South Korea. When he regained his fitness, he was loaned out to League Two clubs Darlington and Stockport County.

In May 2008 he was one of a number of young players released by Bolton manager Gary Megson. Afterwards, he signed with Toronto FC.

Smith made his MLS debut on August 17, 2008, as a second-half substitute in a 2–0 loss to the New York Red Bulls. Midway through the 2009 MLS season, Smith expressed his desire to leave Toronto. After long talks with the Toronto FC GM, both parties decided leaving was in the best interest of Smith, especially with interest for him coming from a club in Croatia. He was released by Toronto FC on June 16, 2009.

In July 2009 he signed a two-year contract with HNK Rijeka of the Croatian Prva Liga. Smith made his debut the same month in Rijeka's match against Luxembourg side FC Differdange 03 in the Europa League qualifying round when he came off the bench.

After leaving Rijeka, Johann trained with Kalmar FF of the Swedish Allsvenskan for two weeks. On March 23, 2010, Kalmar FF and Smith agreed to a one-year contract. On May 25, Kalmar FF terminated their contract with Smith, stating that he did not live up to their expectations.

Smith was in talks with Rijnsburgse Boys of the Dutch Topklasse league in February 2011. However, a contract was not offered. Later in 2011, Smith continued to trial around Europe, most notably with German sides SV Wacker Burghausen, Kickers Offenbach and 1. FC Magdeburg.

Smith trialed with the New York Red Bulls in the summer of 2012, but was not offered a contract.

In September 2012, Smith signed a contract with Finnish club KuPS of the Veikkausliiga until the end of the season, ending Smith's two-year hiatus from professional soccer.

In 2014, Smith spent time with both Adelaide Raiders and Cumberland United in the NPL South Australia.

On March 17, 2015, Smith signed with Canadian club FC Edmonton of the North American Soccer League.

=== International ===
Smith was named to the United States squad for the 2007 FIFA U-20 World Cup in Canada, but a pre-tournament injury forced his removal from the team. He has since played for the United States U-20 team, but he has not been called up to the senior squad.

== Career statistics ==
As of match played 5 September 2016

Appearances and goals by club, season and competition
Club	Season	League			National Cup		League Cup		Other		Total	
Club	Season	Division	Apps	Goals	Apps	Goals	Apps	Goals	Apps	Goals	Apps	Goals
Bolton Wanderers	2006-07	Premier League	1	0	1	0	1	0	0	0	3	0
Bolton Wanderers	2007-08	Premier League	0	0	0	0	0	0	0	0	0	0
Bolton Wanderers	Total		1	0	1	0	1	0	0	0	3	0
Carlisle United (loan)	2006-07	League One	14	1	0	0	0	0	0	0	14	1
Darlington Country (loan)	2007-08	League Two	2	0	0	0	0	0	0	0	2	0
Stockport County (loan)	2007-08	League Two	2	0	0	0	0	0	0	0	2	0
Toronto FC	2008	MLS	10	0	0	0	0	0	0	0	10	0
Toronto FC	2009	MLS	4	0	1	0	0	0	0	0	5	0
Toronto FC	Total		14	0	1	0	0	0	0	0	15	0
Rijeka	2009-10	Prva HNL	5	0	0	0	0	0	4 (Note: Appearance(s) in UEFA Europa League.)	0	9	0
Kalmar	2010	Allsvenskan	2	0	0	0	0	0	0	0	2	0
KuPS	2012	Veikkausliiga	4	0	1	0	0	0	0	0	5	0
Edmonton	2015	NASL	22	0	2	0	0	0	0	0	24	0
Edmonton	2016	NASL	13	0	2	0	0	0	0	0	15	0
Edmonton	Total		35	0	4	0	0	0	0	0	39	0
Career total			79	1	7	0	1	0	4	0	91	1

== Academic career ==
Smith has been studying at Stanford University since the winter semester of 2021/2022. He is studying American history as a major in order to qualify for medical studies at Stanford. In addition to his studies, he is a volunteer coach of the men's soccer team at his university. He is also a student researcher at the Hoover Institution.
