= Ritchie Jones =

English footballer

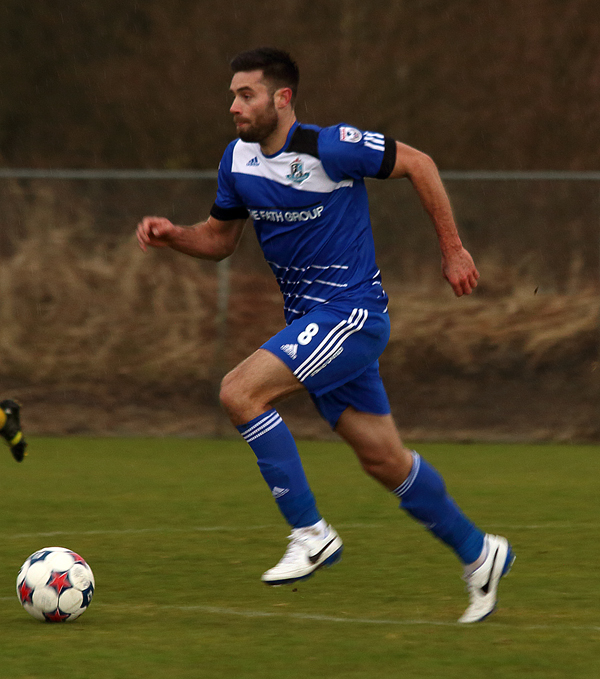
- Jones playing for Edmonton in 2014

Personal information
- Full name: Richard Glynn Jones
- Date of birth: 26 September 1986 (age 40)
- Place of birth: Manchester, England
- Height: 6 ft 0 in (1.83 m)
- Position: Midfielder

Youth career
- 2003–2005: Manchester United

Senior career*
Years	Team	Apps	(Gls)
2005–2008	Manchester United	0	(0)
2005–2006	→ Royal Antwerp (loan)	6	(2)
2006	→ Colchester United (loan)	6	(0)
2006–2007	→ Barnsley (loan)	4	(0)
2007	→ Yeovil Town (loan)	9	(0)
2008–2010	Hartlepool United	69	(7)
2010–2011	Oldham Athletic	31	(1)
2011–2013	Bradford City	36	(1)
2013	Rochdale	3	(0)
2013	Grimsby Town	6	(0)
2014–2016	Edmonton	44	(7)
Total		214	(18)

International career
2002–2003	England U16	6	(3)
2003–2004	England U17	7	(2)
2004–2005	England U18	9	(1)
2005–2006	England U19	11	(0)
2006	England U20	1	(0)
- * Club domestic league appearances and goals as of 30 June 2016

Richard Glynn "Ritchie" Jones (born 26 September 1986) is an English former professional footballer who played as a midfielder.

He is a product of the Manchester United youth system and was joined the club at the age of nine, Jones made five appearances for the first team, playing in the FA Cup and League Cup. During his time at United, he also went on loan to a number of lower league teams to gain first-team experience. He has made league starts for Colchester United and Barnsley in 2006–07, Yeovil Town in the 2007–08 season and, in 2006, went on loan to Belgium's Royal Antwerp for a month. Since leaving United he has played for Hartlepool United, Oldham Athletic, Bradford City, Rochdale, Grimsby Town and FC Edmonton.

== Career ==
=== Manchester United ===
Jones was a member of the Manchester United Academy from the age of nine, and scored the golden goal to win the Milk Cup in 2003, beating Preston in the final. He captained United's Youth Cup team and was part of the United reserve side that won four trophies in 2004–05, and three trophies in 2005–06. Jones appeared for the Manchester United first team five times during his career with the club. He made his senior debut for United on 26 October 2005 in a League Cup game against Barnet. Jones was also named as a substitute in a Champions league game away to French team Lille. This was followed by a place on the bench against Aston Villa in the Premier League, and then another appearance away to Birmingham in the League Cup.

His next appearance was in a highly emotional night against West Bromwich Albion at Old Trafford, when he came on for the last half-hour and almost scored in a game that was dedicated to the late George Best. His last appearance before going on loan for first-team experience was away to Burton Albion in the FA Cup, although the match ended as a scoreless draw. In the 2004–05 season, Jones played for United's reserve side in the Central League and the Premier Reserve League, both of which United won. His goals also helped United get to the final of two cup competitions. In August 2006, former Arsenal manager Don Howe wrote about Jones in The Telegraph, commenting on his ability, versatility and praise for his United performances.

In January 2006, Jones was sent on loan to Manchester United's "feeder club", Belgian Second Division club Royal Antwerp, to gain further first-team experience. However, after playing just two games for Antwerp, his loan spell was cut short to provide cover for an injury-hit United midfield. At the start of the 2006–07 season, Jones made two more first-team appearances, playing in pre-season friendlies against Preston North End and Macclesfield Town, in which he was credited with an assist for Wayne Rooney's goal. He then played in United's 2–1 League Cup win over Crewe Alexandra, in which his cross set up Ole Gunnar Solskjær to score United's first goal.

In October 2006, he was loaned to Colchester United for a month to provide cover for injuries at the Championship club. His performances earned him praise from the Colchester United manager, Geraint Williams, saying Jones was a credit to his club, and though Jones expressed a desire to remain at Colchester, he returned to Manchester United at the end of his loan. In February 2007, he joined fellow Manchester United youngster Adam Eckersley on loan at Barnsley until 7 May 2007. He was given the number 10 shirt, and made four appearances for the Tykes before returning to Manchester United. At the start of the 2007–08 season, Jones played in a pre-season friendly alongside Owen Hargreaves in midfield against Peterborough United. Manchester United won 3–1, with Jones scoring one of the goals.

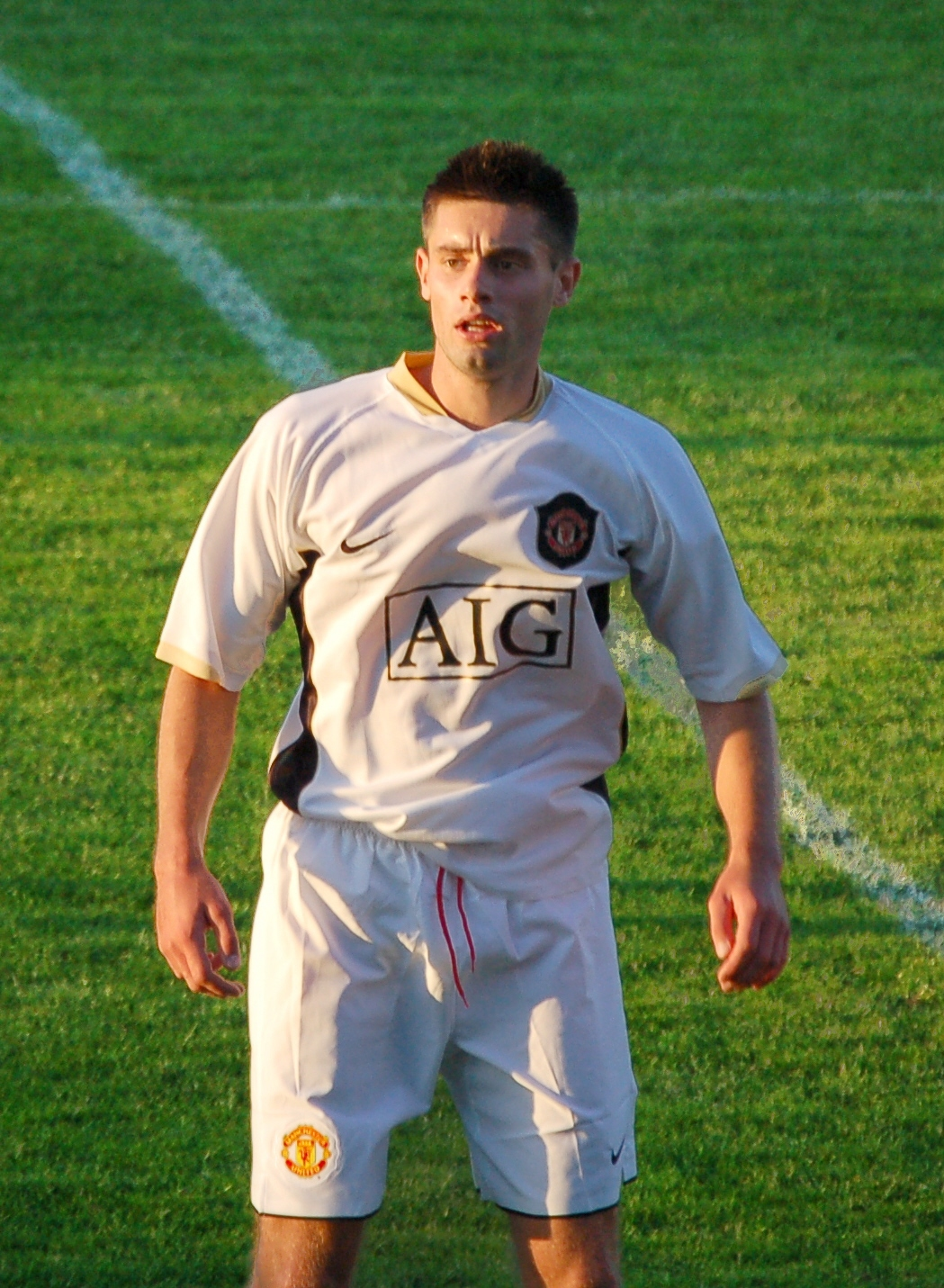
Jones with Manchester United in the 2007 pre-season.

However, on 14 August 2007, Jones signed for Yeovil Town on a short-term loan until 31 December 2007 to gain further first-team football. He made his debut for Yeovil on 18 August 2007 against Port Vale. It was his cross that led to the only goal in a 1–0 win for Yeovil. On 28 December 2007, Jones returned to Manchester United as planned to compete for his place in United's first team. In March 2008, Jones went on trial with Championship side Burnley for a week. Burnley manager Owen Coyle said he liked the look of Jones, but felt it inappropriate to say any more while Jones is under contract at another club.

=== Hartlepool United ===
On 27 June 2008, it was announced that Jones was to be released by Manchester United at the end of his contract on 30 June. On 4 July 2008, Jones signed for Hartlepool United on a free transfer, beating off competition from Hearts and Tranmere Rovers.

In his first season at Hartlepool United, Jones came second in an end-of-season fans vote for 'Young Player of the Year', resulting in Hartlepool taking up their option to extend Jones' contract to the end of the 2009–10 season. On 12 May 2010, Jones was granted a free transfer from Hartlepool United.

=== Oldham Athletic ===
Two months later, on 7 July 2010, Jones signed a one-year contract with Oldham Athletic, with the option to extend the deal by a further year, becoming Paul Dickov's first signing as Oldham manager.

It was reported that Jones had also been offered contracts by a Championship team and two other League One sides. Jones scored his first and only goal for Oldham in a 5–2 defeat against Peterborough United on 10 September 2010, heading home a pass from Paul Black to open the scoring.

Paul Dickov praised the hard-working Jones for his unselfish work rate. However, in April, Jones reacted with anger after manager Dickov left him out of the squad against Yeovil Town and was disciplined because of that.

Later that month, Jones was offered a new contract by the club. However, on 9 May 2011, Jones declined Oldham's offer of a one-year extension to his contract, despite Dickov's keenness to keep him on. The two parties agreed that Jones would leave on a free transfer at the end of his current contract. Jones was then rumoured to be linked with a move to clubs from Major League Soccer.

=== Bradford City ===
On 13 July 2011, Jones joined Bradford City on a free transfer, signing a two-year contract. On 13 September, Jones scored his first goal for Bradford against Port Vale. In the 2011–12 season, Bradford reached the Northern area semi-final of the Football League Trophy; in the previous rounds, Bradford knocked out Sheffield Wednesday and Sheffield United, both via penalty shoot-outs, with Jones scoring a penalty in both games.

In 2012–13, Bradford again reached the Northern area semi-final of the Football League Trophy. Jones scored in the quarter-final against Port Vale to progress to the semi-final against Crewe Alexandra. On 11 December 2012, Jones featured for Bradford in the famous victory over Arsenal in the League Cup quarter-final at Valley Parade. However, having only made 10 appearances in the 2012–13 season because of damaging his ankle ligaments, Jones left the club by mutual consent at the end of January 2013.

=== Rochdale and Grimsby Town ===
On 12 February 2013, Jones signed for Rochdale until the end of the season. Jones sustained an ankle injury and would only make three appearances for the club. At the end of the season, Rochdale did not offer Jones an extension to his contract and he was released by the club.

On 11 September 2013, following a short trial with the San Jose Earthquakes in the United States, Jones joined Grimsby Town on trial, and a few days later he joined the club on a rolling monthly contract. Grimsby manager Paul Hurst said there was no doubt he would like to agree a permanent deal for the midfielder, as he was concerned that rival clubs could start to circling for Jones after a promising start to his career. On 10 October 2013, he signed a contract keeping him at the club until mid-January. On 27 November 2013, he was released by the club by mutual consent, having played six times.

=== FC Edmonton ===
On 15 January 2014, Jones signed with NASL club FC Edmonton.

Jones made his NASL debut with the Eddies in their season opener on 12 April, starting in central midfield against the Tampa Bay Rowdies. His first ever goal with FC Edmonton, a scissor kick against the Carolina RailHawks on 16 August, saw Jones named to the NASL Team of the Week. Jones made it into the NASL Team of the Week for a second time on 15 October, again against Carolina Railhawks, after scoring and providing an assist in FC Edmonton's win against them. After a very successful Fall season, FC Edmonton narrowly missed out on a playoff place by one point.

On 10 May 2015, Jones captained the side against New York Cosmos and scored one of FC Edmonton's two goals. On 22 June 2016, FC Edmonton and Jones mutually agreed to terminate his contract, in order to allow him to recuperate from a serious knee injury suffered in November 2015.

== International career ==
Jones has also played for England at every level from Under-15 to Under-20, scoring the winning goal for the Under-17 side in the Nordic Championship final in Sweden. He was a member of the England Under-19 squad that reached the final of the 2005 UEFA European Under-19 Championship, before losing out to France. He acted as captain during some of these matches.

In 2010 Trevor Brooking, Director of football development at the FA, cited Ritchie Jones in a newspaper article regarding the situation with the England National Team. He stated "A classic example is the 2005 England U19 tournament team, none of whom is anywhere near the full national team now at the age of 24 [...] Typical is skipper Ritchie Jones, who was then at Manchester United but is now a midfielder at Oldham. One crucial reason is that Premier League clubs are not willing to trust in local youth in the way that other countries do".

== Career statistics ==
Appearances and goals by club, season and competition
Club	Season	League			FA Cup		League Cup		Other		Total	
Club	Season	Division	Apps	Goals	Apps	Goals	Apps	Goals	Apps	Goals	Apps	Goals
Manchester United	2005–06	Premier League	0	0	1	0	3	0	0	0	4	0
Manchester United	2006–07	Premier League	0	0	0	0	1	0	0	0	1	0
Manchester United	2007–08	Premier League	0	0	0	0	0	0	0	0	0	0
Manchester United	Total		0	0	1	0	4	0	0	0	5	0
Colchester United (loan)	2006–07	Championship	6	0	0	0	0	0	0	0	6	0
Barnsley (loan)	2006–07	Championship	4	0	0	0	0	0	0	0	4	0
Yeovil Town (loan)	2007–08	League One	9	0	0	0	0	0	2	0	11	0
Hartlepool United	2008–09	League One	36	3	4	0	2	0	0	0	42	3
Hartlepool United	2009–10	League One	33	4	1	0	2	0	0	0	36	4
Hartlepool United	Total		69	7	5	0	4	0	0	0	78	7
Oldham Athletic	2010–11	League One	31	1	1	0	1	0	0	0	33	1
Bradford City	2011–12	League Two	32	1	2	0	1	0	3	0	38	1
Bradford City	2012–13	League Two	4	0	2	0	1	0	3	1	10	1
Bradford City	Total		36	1	4	0	2	0	6	1	48	2
Rochdale	2012–13	League Two	3	0	0	0	0	0	0	0	3	0
FC Edmonton	2014	NASL	22	3	0	0	3	0	0	0	25	3
FC Edmonton	2015	NASL	22	4	0	0	4	0	0	0	26	4
FC Edmonton	Total		44	7	0	0	7	0	0	0	51	7
Career total			200	16	11	0	15	0	8	1	245	17
