= Hanson Boakai =

Canadian soccer player

Personal information
- Full name: Hanson Tamba Boakai
- Date of birth: 28 October 1996 (age 30)
- Place of birth: Teldou, Guinea
- Height: 1.62 m (5 ft 4 in)
- Position: Midfielder

Youth career
- Xtreme FC
- 2011–2013: FC Edmonton

Senior career*
Years	Team	Apps	(Gls)
2013–2015	FC Edmonton	30	(1)
2016	Dugopolje	0	(0)
2016	Landskrona BoIS	4	(0)
2017	UTA Arad	2	(0)
2018	Ekenäs IF	23	(6)
2019	Inter Turku	2	(0)
2020	FC Edmonton	6	(0)

International career^{‡}
2011	Canada U15	1	(0)
2013	Canada U17	7	(2)
2014–2015	Canada U20	9	(1)
2015	Canada U23	5	(0)
- * Club domestic league appearances and goals as of September 1, 2020 ‡ National team caps and goals as of 10 October 2015

Hanson Tamba Boakai (born 28 October 1996) is a professional soccer player who plays as a midfielder. Born a Liberian refugee in Guinea, he has represented Canada at youth level.

He holds the record for the youngest player ever to appear in a NASL game at the age of 16 years and 231 days, taking the record away from his former coach, Colin Miller.

== Club career ==
Boakai was born to Liberian parents in Teldou, a small southwestern village in Guinea located a short distance from the border with Sierra Leone. He moved to Edmonton, Alberta, when he was seven years old. Before joining FC Edmonton's reserves, Boakai played for Xtreme FC. He joined FC Edmonton in 2011 after trying-out with the side.

=== FC Edmonton ===
After spending two years with the reserves, Boakai was signed professional by FC Edmonton of the North American Soccer League on 20 February 2013, becoming the youngest player ever signed by an NASL side. On 16 June 2013 Boakai made his professional debut for Edmonton against the Carolina Railhawks in which he came on in the 65th minute for Sadi Jalali and at the same time becoming the youngest ever player to play an NASL game. Edmonton drew the game 1–1.

Boakai scored his first goal for FC Edmonton against Ottawa Fury FC in the 2014 Canadian Championship. FC Edmonton won the game 3–1 and advanced to the semi-finals.

Boakai scored his first goal in the NASL against the San Antonio Scorpions in a 4–0 win on 5 July 2015. His contract with FC Edmonton expired at the end of the 2015 season.

=== Dugopolje ===
In February 2016, Boakai signed a contract until the end of the season with Croatian Second Division club NK Dugopolje.

=== Landskrona BoIS ===
On 11 July 2016, Boakai signed with Landskrona, who play in Division 1 Södra, the third tier of football in Sweden, which was to run through 2017 November. In November 2016, Landskrona announced that Boakai's contract was terminated.

=== UTA Arad ===
After almost a year without contract, Boakai signed with Romanian Liga II side UTA Arad in October 2017. Due to visa issues, Boakai was unable to appear for UTA for over a month before making his debut on 10 November 2017 as a 71st-minute substitute in a 2-1 loss to Târgu Mureș.

=== Ekenäs IF ===
Boakai joined Finnish Ykkönen side Ekenäs IF on 16 March 2018. Made his first appearance 14 April 2018. He scored his first goal for the club against FC KTP on 26 June 2018. At the end of the season, Ekenäs picked up Boakai's option for the 2019 season. Boakai would score 6 goals and add 6 assists for Ekenäs in 2018.

=== Inter Turku ===
After one season with Ekenäs, Boakai would be transferred to Veikkausliiga side Inter Turku for the 2019 season, with a contract option for the 2020 season.

=== Return to Edmonton ===
On 4 December 2019, Boakai signed for the second time with his youth club FC Edmonton, now playing in the Canadian Premier League. He made his first appearance for the Eddies since 2015 on August 16, 2020 against Forge FC

== International career ==
=== Canada ===
Boakai had played for the Canada U15 soccer side while with the Edmonton reserves. He then played for the Canada U17 during the 2013 CONCACAF U-17 Championship, scoring against Costa Rica U17 and Jamaica U17 sides as Canada managed to make it the semi-finals and thus qualify for the 2013 FIFA U-17 World Cup.

Boakai continued to represent Canada at the U20 level and was a part of the team that traveled to Northern Ireland for the 2014 Milk Cup. After a strong showing for the youth sides, and a continued presence with Edmonton, Canada coach Benito Floro called up Boakai to the senior team for a friendly against Colombia in October 2014. He did not play, however.

=== Liberia ===
In September 2019, Boakai was called up to the Liberia national team for a friendly against Botswana.

== Career statistics ==
As of 16 June 2019

Club	Season	Division	League		Cup		Other		Total	
Club	Season	Division	Apps	Goals	Apps	Goals	Apps	Goals	Apps	Goals
FC Edmonton	2013	NASL	3	0	0	0	0	0	3	0
FC Edmonton	2014	NASL	15	0	4	1	0	0	19	1
FC Edmonton	2015	NASL	12	1	2	0	0	0	14	1
FC Edmonton	Total		30	1	6	1	0	0	36	2
Landskrona BoIS	2016	Swedish Division 1	4	0	0	0	–		4	0
UTA Arad	2017–18	Liga II	2	0	0	0	–		2	0
Ekenäs IF	2018	Ykkönen	23	6	1	0	–		24	6
Inter Turku	2019	Veikkausliiga	2	0	4	1	0	0	6	1
FC Edmonton	2020	Canadian Premier League	6	0	0	0	–		6	0
Career Total			67	7	11	2	0	0	78	9
