= John Smits =

Canadian soccer player (born 1988)

Personal information
- Date of birth: September 7, 1988 (age 38)
- Place of birth: Mississauga, Ontario, Canada
- Height: 1.93 m (6 ft 4 in)
- Position: Goalkeeper

Team information
- Current team: Canadian Crusaders (indoor)
- Number: 50

Youth career
- A.C. Diavoli

College career
Years	Team	Apps	(Gls)
2008–2011	Toronto Varsity Blues	28	(0)

Senior career*
Years	Team	Apps	(Gls)
2012–2015	FC Edmonton	38	(0)
2015	→ Montreal Impact (loan)	0	(0)
2016	Wilmington Hammerheads	18	(0)
2022	Unionville Milliken SC	1	(0)
2022–2024	Serbian White Eagles	1	(0)
2025–	Canadian Crusaders (indoor)	6	(0)

International career^{‡}
2024–	Canada (futsal)	1	(0)

Managerial career
- 2017–: Toronto Varsity Blues (goalkeeping coach)
- * Club domestic league appearances and goals as of April 11, 2026 ‡ National team caps and goals as of April 14, 2024

John Smits (born September 7, 1988) is a Canadian soccer player and coach.

== Early life ==
Smits played youth soccer with A.C. Diavoli.

== University career ==
From 2008 to 2011, Smits attended the University of Toronto, where he played for the men's soccer team. In 2009, he was named an OUA East Second Team All-Star, after recording a CIS-leading 11 shut outs in 2009. In 2010, he helped the team win the 2010 OUA championship, earning player of the match honours in the final, and was also named an OUA First Team All-Star.

== Club career ==
In March 2012, Smits signed with FC Edmonton of the North American Soccer League in 2012. Smits made his professional debut against the Atlanta Silverbacks on May 12, 2012, posting a shutout. In 2014, Smits won the NASL Golden Glove as the league's top goalkeeper, after finishing with the lowest goals against average in the league that season. In April 2015, Smits joined the Montreal Impact on a short-term loan for the 2014–15 CONCACAF Champions League semi-final. He re-joined on another short-term loan for the final. He served as the backup for Montreal and did not make an appearance, before returning to Edmonton for the remainder of the season. After the 2015 season, he was released by the club, after losing his starting spot during the season.

In February 2016, Smits signed with the Wilmington Hammerheads of the USL. Smits would only spend one season in Wilmington, as the club announced that they would not participate in the 2017 USL season.

In April 2022, he played one match for Unionville Milliken SC in League1 Ontario.

In May 2022, he made a lone appearance for Canadian Soccer League side Serbian White Eagles FC but broke his foot in the match and had to be substituted.

== International career ==
Smits has played for the Canada national beach soccer team.

In April 2024, he was named to the Canada national futsal team roster for the 2024 CONCACAF Futsal Championship.

== Coaching career ==
In July 2017, Smits returned to his university team, the Toronto Varsity Blues, as goalkeeper coach.

== Other playing ==
In 2023, he played with Sports Leagues Canada FC at The Soccer Tournament, finishing in second place.

== Statistics ==
Statistics accurate as of May 1, 2022

Club	Season	League			Domestic Cup		Playoffs		Continental		Total	
Club	Season	Division	Apps	Goals	Apps	Goals	Apps	Goals	Apps	Goals	Apps	Goals
FC Edmonton	NASL	2012	7	0	0	0	—		—		7	0
FC Edmonton	NASL	2013	7	0	0	0	—		—		7	0
FC Edmonton	NASL	2014	20	0	4	0	—		—		24	0
FC Edmonton	NASL	2015	4	0	0	0	—		—		4	0
FC Edmonton	Total		38	0	4	0	0	0	0	0	42	0
Montreal Impact (loan)	MLS	2015	0	0	0	0	0	0	0	0	0	0
Montreal Impact (loan)	Total		0	0	0	0	0	0	0	0	0	0
Wilmington Hammerheads	USL	2016	18	0	1	0	—		—		19	0
Unionville Milliken SC	League1 Ontario	2022	1	0	—		—		—		1	0
Career total			57	0	5	0	0	0	0	0	62	0
