= Cristian Raudales =

Honduran footballer (born 1989)

Personal information
- Full name: Cristian Raudales Martinez
- Date of birth: October 3, 1989 (age 37)
- Place of birth: Tegucigalpa, Honduras
- Height: 1.77 m (5 ft 10 in)
- Position: Midfielder

Team information
- Current team: FC Kendall

College career
Years	Team	Apps	(Gls)
2008–2011	Florida Gulf Coast Eagles	71	(19)

Senior career*
Years	Team	Apps	(Gls)
2012–2013	BSV Schwarz-Weiß Rehden	19	(1)
2014–2016	FC Edmonton	46	(1)
- * Club domestic league appearances and goals as of March 28, 2019

Cristian Raudales Martinez (born October 3, 1989) is a Honduran footballer who currently plays for amateur team FC Kendall.

== Career ==
After four years playing college soccer at Florida Gulf Coast University from 2008 to 2011. Raudales was an All-Conference selection during his college career for the years 2009, 2010, 2011. He graduated the FGCU program as the highest leading scorer, the record holder for overall points (goals and assists combined), and helped the team reach the 1st round of the NCAA tournament during his senior year. Raudales signed with German fourth division club BSV Schwarz-Weiß Rehden. After leaving the club at the end of the 2014 season, Raudales trialled with and eventually signed for NASL club. FC Edmonton. Raudales had a very successful amateur/high school career. He is a former NSCAA Adidas High School All-American for the years 2007, 2008. Florida High School player of the year for 2007, 2008. And also NSCAA All-South Region 1st team 2005–2008.
