= Albert Watson (footballer, born 1985) =

Northern Irish footballer (born 1985)

Personal information
- Date of birth: 8 September 1985 (age 41)
- Place of birth: Belfast, Northern Ireland
- Position: Defender

Team information
- Current team: Newry City

Senior career*
Years	Team	Apps	(Gls)
2001–2011	Ballymena United	264	(9)
2011–2013	Linfield	49	(3)
2013–2017	FC Edmonton	129	(5)
2018	KR	14	(0)
2019	Ballymena United	8	(1)
2019–2023	Larne	107	(4)
2023–	Carrick Rangers	40	(2)
2025–2026	Armagh City	17	(0)
2026–	Newry City	6	(1)

International career
2007	Northern Ireland U23		
- * Club domestic league appearances and goals as of 29 April 2026

Albert Watson (born 8 September 1985) is a Northern Irish professional football player and coach who plays for Newry City, and is a coach at Larne.

== Club career ==
=== Early career ===
Born in Belfast, Watson made his senior-club debut for Ballymena United on 4 December 2001 in a 1–1 draw against Institute, at 16 years of age. He attracted interest from Linfield in February 2008, although any interest concluded when Watson signed a new contract with Ballymena a few days later. In January 2011, Watson made his 300th appearance for the club.

In April 2011 he joined Linfield on a two-year contract, during which the team would capture two consecutive Premiership and Irish Cup doubles.

=== FC Edmonton ===
On 18 January 2013, it was announced that Watson, along with teammate Daryl Fordyce would not return to Linfield the following season, instead seeking new playing opportunities in Canada. On 25 February 2013, it was reported that both Watson and Fordyce would join FC Edmonton. Watson was named FC Edmonton captain prior to the 2013 NASL season, and after missing the first few months due to a torn MCL, went on to be named in the NASL Best XI for the season.

After the 2015 NASL season, Watson signed with the club for a fourth season. In August 2016, would go on to become the first player to make 100 appearances for the club. After FC Edmonton surrendered a league low 21 goals in 32 games during the 2016 NASL season, Watson was named to the NASL Best 11 for the second time in the 2016 season.

=== Knattspyrnufélag Reykjavíkur ===
On 13 March 2018, he joined Icelandic team KR.

=== Return to Ballymena United ===
In January 2019 he returned to Ballymena United.

=== Larne ===
On 3 June 2019, it was announced that Watson had signed on a full-time deal for Larne.

=== Carrick Rangers ===
In June 2023 he signed for Carrick Rangers.

=== Armagh City ===
In July 2025 he signed for Armagh City, combining his playing career with a coaching role at Larne.

=== Newry City ===
In January 2026 he signed for Newry City.

== International career ==
Watson has captained the Northern Irish under-23 side.

== Honours ==
Linfield

- Irish Cup: 2011–12
- IFA Premiership: 2011–12

Larne

- County Antrim Shield: 2020–21, 2021–22, 2022–23
- NIFL Premiership: 2022–23

Individual

- Linfield Player of the Year: 2011–12
- North American Soccer League Best XI: 2013, 2016
