= Frank Jonke =

Canadian former soccer player (born 1985)

Personal information
- Full name: Frank Jonke, Jr.
- Date of birth: January 30, 1985 (age 41)
- Place of birth: Pickering, Ontario, Canada
- Height: 1.91 m (6 ft 3 in)
- Position: Striker

Youth career
- 2005: Notre Dame College
- 2006–2007: Louisville Cardinals

Senior career*
Years	Team	Apps	(Gls)
2007	Toronto Lynx	2	(0)
2008	Italia Shooters	11	(7)
2008	FF Jaro	0	(0)
2008	→ JBK (loan)	4	(8)
2009–2010	AC Oulu	44	(22)
2011	Inter Turku	20	(3)
2012–2013	FF Jaro	46	(20)
2014–2015	FC Edmonton	33	(0)

International career^{‡}
2013	Canada	1	(0)
- * Club domestic league appearances and goals as of October 25, 2015 ‡ National team caps and goals as of July 19, 2015

Frank Jonke (born January 30, 1985) is a Canadian former soccer player who played in the USL Premier Development League, Canadian Soccer League, Kakkonen, Ykkönen, Veikkausliiga, and the North American Soccer League.

== Playing career ==
Born in Pickering, Ontario, Jonke was a product of the Toronto Lynx academy, playing for the U19 Toronto Lynx in the Dallas Cup. In his high school years he attended St. Mary's Catholic Secondary School. Was team captain his junior and senior seasons, leading the team in goals both seasons. Jonke earned a scholarship to attend Notre Dame College, finishing the season as top scorer in the American Mideast Conference with 25 goals. Earning NAIA Honorable Mention All-America Honors, being named to the All-American Mideast Conference first team, also named to the All-Region IX team. And was awarded the Newcomer of the Year by his teammates.

Jonke was transferred to the University of Louisville in 2005, during his junior year he started in 15 matches, led the team with seven goals on the season, and earned second team All-Big East honors. In his sophomore season he started in 17 games for the Cardinals, and led the team in goals scored with six goals.

On February 28, 2007, Jonke was signed by the Toronto Lynx for the 2007 PDL season, along with other Toronto Lynx academy graduates. He made his Lynx debut on May 12, 2007, against the West Michigan Edge in a 3–0 defeat at home. Unfortunately for Jonke, he was largely confined to the bench for most of the season, only appearing in 2 matches.

The following year he was transferred to the Italia Shooters for the 2008 CSL season. After scoring his first goal of the season Jonke continued his fine form by scoring 7 goals in a five consecutive matches. He also helped the Shooters achieve a 5-game undefeated streak. His performance was noticed by scouts sent by FF Jaro, and subsequently signed with the club.

He was later loaned out to Jakobstads Bollklubb, in order to gain more sufficient playing time. Jonke immediately impressed where he recorded eight goals in only four appearances. Once his loan was complete Jonke was released from his contract with Jaro. In 2009, he was signed by AC Oulu of the Ykkönen. Jonke made his debut for Oulu on April 25, 2009, where he scored the goal that tied the match 1–1 against FC Hämeenlinna. Jonke dominated the season by recording nine goals, and helped lead Oulu win promotion to the Veikkausliiga by finishing first in the standings. On September 13, 2010, he scored four goals against FC Honka.

In June 2011 he was signed by FC Inter Turku. After playing the remainder of the season with FC Inter Turku Jonke signed a contract with Veikkausliiga club FF Jaro in June 2012. In 2014, he returned to Canada to sign with FC Edmonton of the North American Soccer League. Where he suffered from a string of injuries. On October 28, 2015, he was one of the several players released from the club.

== International career ==
In 2008, he was called by head coach Nick Dasovic to the Canada men's national under-20 soccer team camp.

On January 18, 2013, Jonke received his first call up by the Canada national team for friendlies against Denmark and United States He made his senior team debut on January 29 in a friendly against United States as a second half sub for Dwayne De Rosario, the game ended as a 0–0 draw.

== Managerial career ==
In 2018, he was the head coach for SC Toronto's male and female youth programs in the Ontario Premier Development League. In 2019, he served as a coach for Sole Soccer Camp.

== Honours ==
=== AC Oulu ===
- Ykkönen: 2009
