= Tomi Ameobi =

English footballer

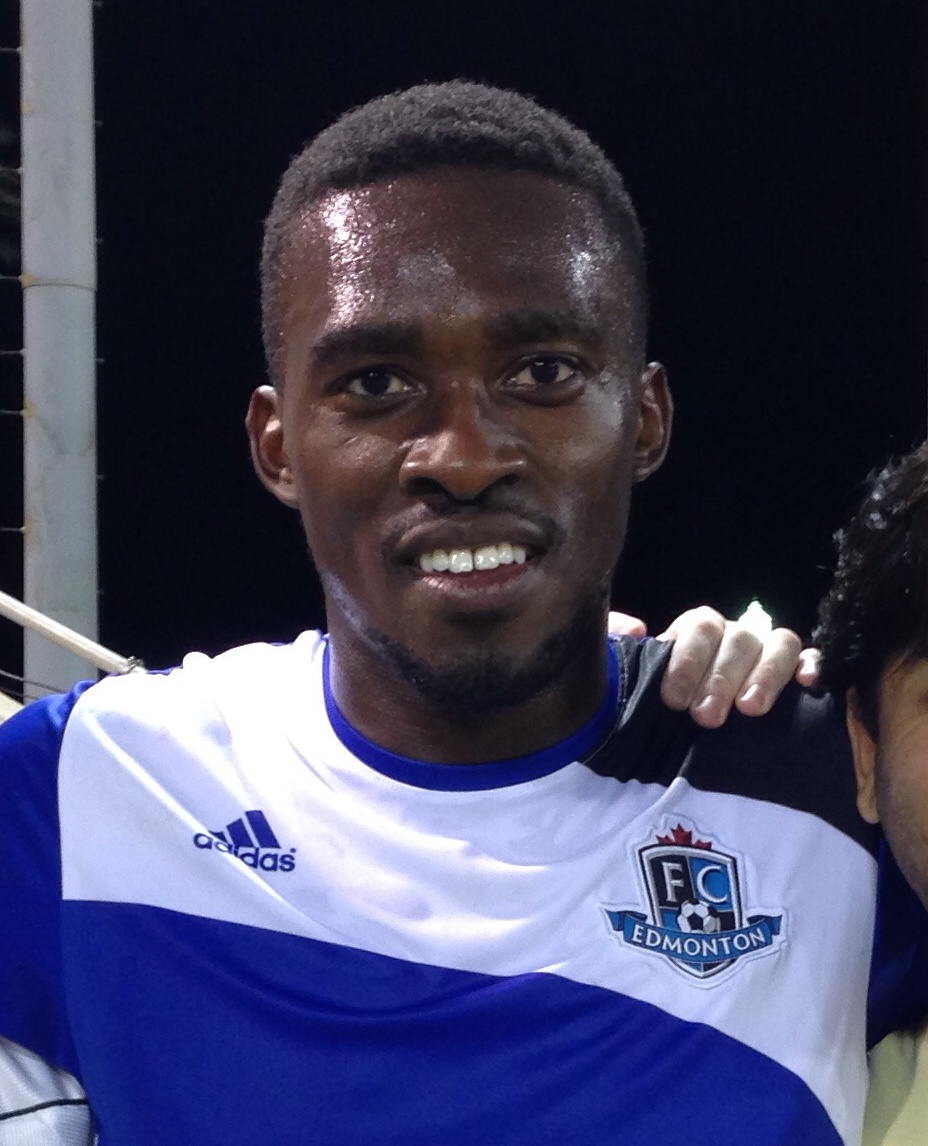
- Ameobi with FC Edmonton after a game in 2014

Personal information
- Full name: Oluwatomiwo Ameobi
- Date of birth: 16 August 1988 (age 38)
- Place of birth: Newcastle upon Tyne, England
- Height: 6 ft 3 in (1.91 m)
- Position: Forward

Youth career
- 2003–2005: Newcastle United
- 2005–2007: Leeds United

Senior career*
Years	Team	Apps	(Gls)
2007–2008	Leeds United	0	(0)
2007–2008	→ Scunthorpe United (loan)	9	(0)
2008–2009	Doncaster Rovers	1	(0)
2008	→ Grimsby Town (loan)	2	(0)
2009	→ Mansfield Town (loan)	4	(0)
2009–2010	Forest Green Rovers	27	(4)
2010–2011	Whitley Bay	4	(3)
2011	BÍ/Bolungarvík	22	(11)
2012	Grindavík	17	(3)
2013	VPS	30	(9)
2013–2014	Whitley Bay	4	(2)
2014–2017	FC Edmonton	94	(21)
2018	FC Cincinnati	4	(0)
2019–2020	FC Edmonton	30	(4)
2023	Edmonton Scottish		
Total		248	(57)
- * Club domestic league appearances and goals as of 6 September 2020

Oluwatomiwo "Tomi" Ameobi (born 16 August 1988) is an English lawyer and former professional footballer who played as a forward.

Having come through the youth academy at Leeds United, he went on to play in the Football League for Scunthorpe United, Doncaster Rovers, Grimsby Town and Mansfield Town before appearing for Non-League sides Forest Green Rovers and Whitley Bay.

In 2011 he moved to play in Europe and had spells in Iceland and Finland with BÍ/Bolungarvík, Grindavík and VPS. In 2014 Ameobi moved to North America and had spells with both FC Edmonton and FC Cincinnati.

== Playing career ==
=== Leeds United ===
The 2007–08 season was Ameobi's first campaign in the Leeds United first team. He previously played for the club's reserve side, which finished sixth in Division One Central of the Central League in 2006–07. Ameobi signed his first professional contract with Leeds United on 8 August 2007. He had been offered the contract on 8 May, but had to wait three months to sign the deal as the club had been placed under a transfer embargo.

He made his first appearance of the pre-season in Leeds United's 2–0 defeat against Northern Premier League side Guiseley on 6 August. He started the match, which was the club's final pre-season fixture, and was replaced after 75 minutes. Ameobi made his debut for Leeds on 28 August, against Portsmouth in the Football League Cup. He was loaned out to the Championship side Scunthorpe United in November 2007.

=== Doncaster Rovers ===
Ameobi returned to Leeds before joining Doncaster on 22 July. On 24 September 2008, he was loaned to Football League Two side Grimsby Town. He later returned to Doncaster after just two appearances. Ameobi signed for Conference National outfit Mansfield Town on loan in January 2009. He returned to Doncaster the following month, having played five games for Mansfield, but was released from his contract on 7 May.

=== Forest Green Rovers ===
In September 2009, Ameobi signed for Forest Green Rovers. He scored his first goal for the club in a 3–2 away win over Hayes & Yeading in January 2010 and also in that month represented Forest Green in the 3rd round of the FA Cup against Notts County. At the end of the season he was released by the club having made 28 league appearances, scoring five goals.

=== Whitley Bay ===
In July 2010, it was announced that Ameobi was on trial with Whitley Bay. He subsequently signed a contract for the club having impressed in their pre-season friendlies. On 4 September 2010, he featured in the 2–2 draw away at Billingham Synthonia coming on as a half-time substitute. Later in the season Ameobi returned to the side, making appearances during Bay's title challenge against Jarrow Roofing and Newcastle Benfield.

=== Europe ===
On 14 May 2011, Ameobi played his first game in Iceland, for BÍ/Bolungarvík in the 1. deild karla. BÍ/Bvk lost 1–2 to ÍR, with Ameobi scoring their only goal in the game. He scored again in the second match of the season, a 2–1 away win against Haukar.

On 12 April 2013, Ameobi signed a 1+1 year contract with Finnish team Vaasan Palloseura.

=== Return to Whitley Bay ===
After his contract with Vaasan Palloseura expired, he returned to Whitley Bay. Ameobi played his debut, after his return, on 28 December 2013 against Guisborough Town.

=== North America ===
Ameobi signed with NASL club FC Edmonton on 31 March 2014. He scored on his debut in a 1–1 draw with the Tampa Bay Rowdies. Ameobi spent four seasons in Edmonton. After the 2017 season, with the future of FC Edmonton and the NASL in doubt, he was released from FC Edmonton. Ameobi would leave Edmonton as the club's second all-time leading scorer.

On 21 February 2018, Ameobi signed with USL side FC Cincinnati for the 2018 season.

On 31 January 2019, Ameobi returned for a second spell with Edmonton after the club joined the Canadian Premier League.

== Law career ==
Ameobi is a lawyer working with Duncan Craig LLP, having graduated from the University of Alberta and Open University.

== Personal life ==
Born in Newcastle upon Tyne, Tyne and Wear. Ameobi is the younger brother of striker Shola Ameobi and the older brother of winger Sammy Ameobi.

He now lives in Edmonton, Alberta, Canada.

== Career statistics ==
As of 19 October 2019

Appearances and goals by club, season and competition
Club	Season	League			National cup (Note: Includes FA Cup, Icelandic Football Cup, Finnish Cup, Canadian Championship and U.S. Open Cup)		League Cup (Note: Includes Football League Cup)		Other		Total	
Club	Season	Division	Apps	Goals	Apps	Goals	Apps	Goals	Apps	Goals	Apps	Goals
Leeds United	2007–08	League One	0	0	0	0	1	0	1 (Note: Appearance in Football League Trophy)	0	2	0
Scunthorpe United (loan)	2007–08	Championship	9	0	1	0	0	0	0	0	10	0
Doncaster Rovers	2008–09	Championship	1	0	0	0	0	0	0	0	1	0
Grimsby Town (loan)	2008–09	League Two	2	0	0	0	0	0	1	0	3	0
Mansfield Town (loan)	2008–09	Conference Premier	4	0	0	0	0	0	0	0	4	0
Forest Green Rovers	2009–10	Conference Premier	27	4	3	0	0	0	0	0	30	4
Whitley Bay	2010–11	Northern Football League Division One	No data currently available									
BÍ/Bolungarvík	2011	1. deild karla	22	11	3	2	0	0	0	0	25	13
Grindavík	2012	Úrvalsdeild karla	17	3	3	1	0	0	0	0	20	4
VPS	2013	Veikkausliiga	30	9	2	0	—		0	0	32	9
Whitley Bay	2013–14	Northern Football League Division One	No data currently available									
FC Edmonton	2014	NASL	23	6	3	1	—		0	0	26	7
FC Edmonton	2015	NASL	18	7	4	4	—		0	0	22	11
FC Edmonton	2016	NASL	30	2	2	0	—		1 (Note: Appearance in Soccer Bowl)	0	33	2
FC Edmonton	2017	NASL	24	6	2	0	—		0	0	26	6
FC Edmonton	Total		95	21	11	5	0	0	1	0	107	26
FC Cincinnati	2018	United Soccer League	4	0	2	0	—		0	0	6	0
FC Edmonton	2019	Canadian Premier League	23	4	2	0	—		0	0	25	4
FC Edmonton	2020	Canadian Premier League	1	0	0	0	—		0	0	1	0
FC Edmonton	Total		24	4	2	0	0	0	0	0	26	4
Career total			235	52	27	8	1	0	3	0	266	60
