= Horace James (footballer) =

Jamaican footballer (born 1984)

Personal information
- Full name: Horace James
- Date of birth: 20 December 1984 (age 41)
- Place of birth: Port Maria, Jamaica
- Height: 1.83 m (6 ft 0 in)
- Position: Midfielder

Team information
- Current team: North Shore United

Senior career*
Years	Team	Apps	(Gls)
2010	St. George's SC	28	(7)
2011	Highgate United	30	(12)
2012	Montego Bay United F.C.	30	(18)
2012–2013	Atlanta Silverbacks	25	(2)
2014	FC Edmonton	27	(2)
2015	Perak FA	6	(2)
2016–2017	SHB Đà Nẵng	11	(2)
2017–2018	Waitakere United	5	(1)
2018	Three Kings United	12	(11)
2018–2019	Nadi FC	3	(1)
2019	Three Kings United	2	(0)
2019	Fencibles United	6	(4)
2020–	North Shore United	18	(13)
- * Club domestic league appearances and goals as of 24 July 2021

Horace James (born 20 December 1984) is a Jamaican footballer who last played for New Zealand club Mount Albert-Ponsonby.

== Career ==
From Port Maria, St Mary Jamaica, Horace James played his debut professional game when he was 18 years old with Star Cosmos in the Jamaica National Premier League. Being his youth club, he joined the Star Cosmos when he was 16 years old and stayed with the side for several seasons.

=== St. Georges ===
James came back to play for St. Georges in the JPL where he stayed for a few seasons. He then moved to High Gate and Montego Bay United.

=== Atlanta Silverbacks ===
On 20 July 2012, James signed with Atlanta Silverbacks. He last played with Montego Bay United of the Red Stripe Premier League. He has previously played with Highgate United and St. George's SC. On 12 August 2012, James made his debut for Atlanta Silverbacks as a sub for Jahbari Willis in the 61'. On 26 August 2012, James made his first start with Atlanta Silverbacks in a 1–0 loss to Carolina RailHawks.

=== FC Edmonton ===
James signed with FC Edmonton in 2014.

=== Perak ===
A year later, he signed for Malaysian team Perak FA, making his debut in the league match against Terengganu FA on 11 April 2015. He contributed an assist in the game, as Perak lost 2–3 at home.

=== SHB Đà Nẵng ===
In February 2016, James joined V.League 1 side SHB Đà Nẵng.

=== Waitakere United ===
In 2017 James joined Waitakere United who play in the New Zealand Football Championship.

=== North Shore United ===
James current plays for North Shore United in the New Zealand Northern League.
