= Lance Laing =

Jamaican footballer (born 1988)

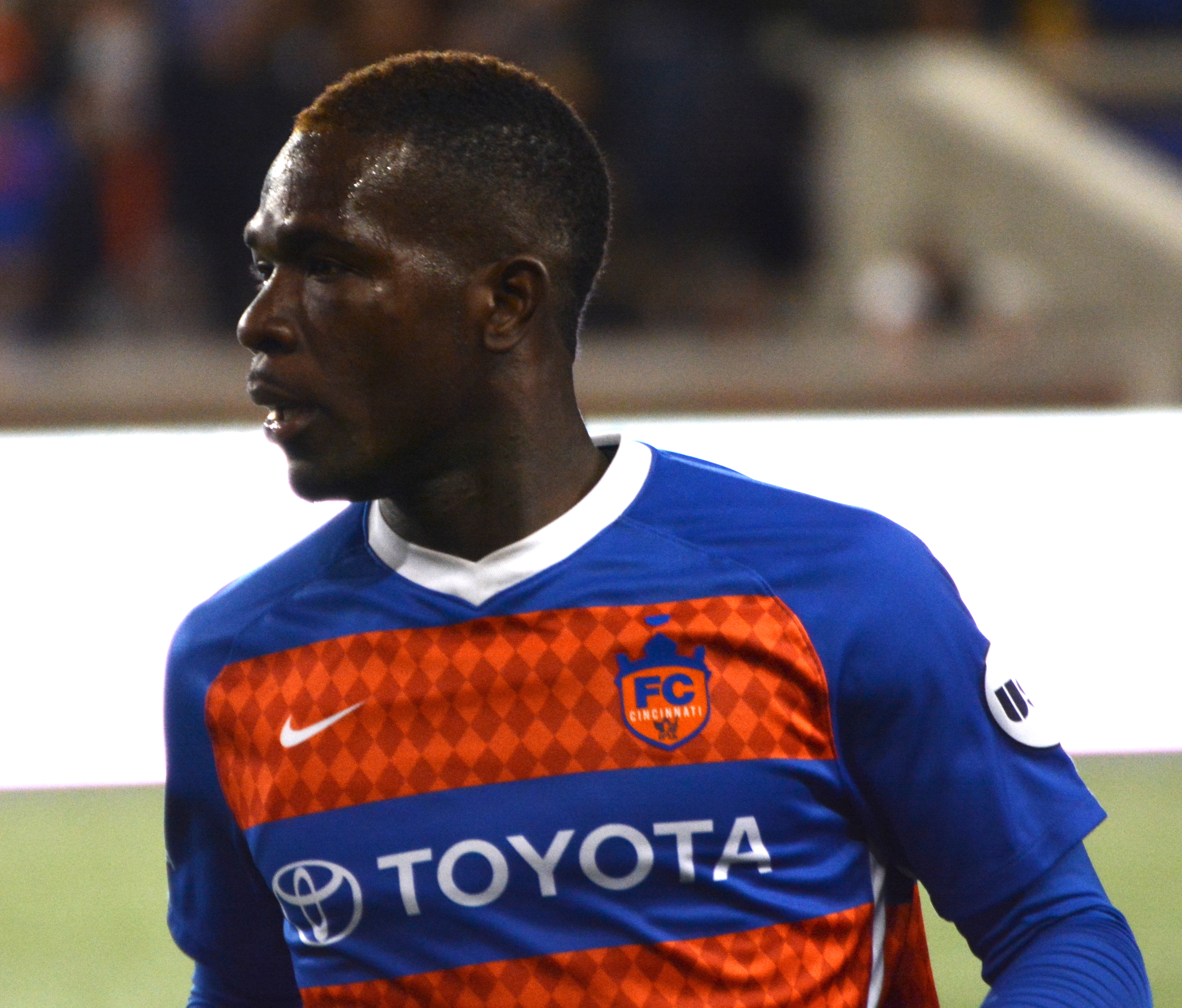
- Laing playing for FC Cincinnati in 2018

Personal information
- Full name: Lance Lorenzo Laing
- Date of birth: 28 February 1988 (age 38)
- Place of birth: Trelawny Parish, Jamaica
- Height: 6 ft 0 in (1.83 m)
- Positions: Left back; winger

Senior career*
Years	Team	Apps	(Gls)
2007–2010	Harbour View		
2010–2011	Village United		(3)
2011–2012	Fort Lauderdale Strikers	39	(2)
2013–2015	FC Edmonton	71	(16)
2016	Minnesota United FC	17	(1)
2017	North Carolina FC	25	(8)
2018	FC Cincinnati	6	(0)
2018	→ San Antonio FC (loan)	10	(5)
2019	San Antonio FC	7	(0)

International career
2004–2005	Jamaica U17		
2008–2015	Jamaica	7	(0)
Medal record
Men's football
Representing Jamaica
CONCACAF Gold Cup
Runner-up	2015 United States–Canada	Team
- * Club domestic league appearances and goals

Lance Lorenzo Laing (born 28 February 1988) is a Jamaican former footballer.

== Career ==
=== Professional ===
Laing began his career in his native Jamaica, playing for Harbour View and Village United in the top flight Jamaica National Premier League. He was part of the Harbour View team which won JNPL titles in 2007 and 2010, and played in the 2007 CFU Club Championship, the 2008 CONCACAF Champions' Cup and the 2008-09 CONCACAF Champions League.

Laing moved to the United States in 2011 when he signed with the Fort Lauderdale Strikers of the North American Soccer League. He made his debut for the Strikers on 29 April, in a 2–2 tie with the Puerto Rico Islanders. He scored his first goal with the club against Montreal Impact on 13 July 2011. Following an impressive debut season with the Strikers, Laing was named to the NASL Best XI for the 2011 season. After the 2011 season, Laing spent some time on trial with both the Columbus Crew and Real Salt Lake of Major League Soccer. Laing scored his second goal with the Strikers, and his first of the 2012 season, off of a freekick in the 3–3 draw against the Carolina RailHawks on 2 May 2012.

On 21 November 2012 FC Edmonton announced that Laing would be joining the team ahead of the 2013 season.

Laing was named FC Edmonton's MVP by supporter group ESG in 2013.

In 2014, following a mid-season move from fullback to midfield, Laing led the Eddies in goals (7) and assists (6). He was twice named NASL Player of the Week including after scoring an 'Olimpico' goal in a 2–0 victory over Ottawa Fury FC. As a result of his fine season, Laing was awarded a contract extension and named MVP by ESG for a second straight year. He was also named to the NASL's Best XI, as voted on by each of the league's 10 head coaches, for the second time in his career.

In 2015, Laing only played 20 games for FC Edmonton as a result of international duty, but still managed 8 goals and 7 assists. The Eddies won just one of the 10 games that Laing missed while representing Jamaica. Following the season, it was reported that Laing would not return to FC Edmonton. On 15 December 2015, it was announced that Laing had signed with Minnesota United FC.

Laing signed with FC Cincinnati of the USL for the 2018 season on 19 December 2017

On 23 August 2018 Laing was loaned from FC Cincinnati to San Antonio FC for the remainder of the 2018 season.

=== International ===
Laing represented Jamaica several times at the under 17 level between 2004 and 2005, and made his debut for the senior national team on 26 July 2008 in an international friendly against El Salvador. As a result of his performances with the Strikers, on 14 May 2012, Laing was recalled to the national team.

In 2015, Laing was recalled to Jamaica's national team for the 2015 Copa America in Chile. He appeared in Jamaica's three group-stage matches, including a start against Argentina on 20 June 2015. Jamaica lost all three matches 1-0 and were eliminated from the tournament.

Laing was also named to Jamaica's roster for the 2015 Gold Cup and appeared in a 1–0 win over Haiti and in a 2–2 tie with Costa Rica. Laing did not appear in Jamaica's historic 2-1 semi-final win over the USA nor in its 3–1 loss to Mexico in the final.

== Honors ==
=== FC Edmonton ===
- North American Soccer League:
  - NASL Best XI(2) 2014

=== Fort Lauderdale Strikers ===
- North American Soccer League:
  - Finalist (1) 2011
  - NASL Best XI(1) 2011

=== Harbour View ===
- Jamaica National Premier League:
  - Winner (2) 2007, 2010
- CFU Club Championship:
  - Winner (1): 2007
