= Michael Nonni =

Canadian soccer player

Personal information
- Full name: Michael William Bowyer Nonni
- Date of birth: 10 November 1989 (age 37)
- Place of birth: West Vancouver, British Columbia, Canada
- Height: 5 ft 9 in (1.75 m)
- Position: Defender

Youth career
- Vancouver Selects
- FC Groningen

College career
Years	Team	Apps	(Gls)
2009–2011	UC Santa Barbara Gauchos	52	(7)

Senior career*
Years	Team	Apps	(Gls)
2011–2012	SV Wilhelmshaven	1	(0)
2013–2015	FC Edmonton	37	(2)
- * Club domestic league appearances and goals

Michael William Bowyer Nonni (born 10 November 1989) is a Canadian former professional soccer player who most recently played with FC Edmonton of the North American Soccer League.

== Early life and education ==
Born in West Vancouver, British Columbia, Nonni spent four years with the Vancouver Selects, winning the Canadian National Championship in 2005. The Vancouver Selects played in multiple tournaments abroad against teams like Manchester United, Ajax, Roma, and AC Milan.

Nonni signed a contract with Eredivise club FC Groningen in 2006.

Nonni accepted a scholarship to UC Santa Barbara in 2009, where he played for the soccer team, the UC Santa Barbara Gauchos.

After spending three seasons at college Nonni went to Germany to play professionally for SV Wilhelmshaven of the Regionalliga Nord. Nonni made his debut for Wilhelmshaven on 19 February 2012 against RB Leipzig at the Red Bull Arena.

== Career ==
On 30 July 2012 it was announced that Nonni had arrived for a trial at FC Edmonton of the North American Soccer League. He then officially signed a professional contract with FC Edmonton during pre-season of 2013.

Nonni made his professional debut for FC Edmonton on 28 April 2013 against the San Antonio Scorpions at Clarke Stadium in which he came on as a 78th-minute substitute for Robert Garrett as FC Edmonton won the match 1–0. Nonni was released by Edmonton on 28 January 2016.

== Career statistics ==
Appearances and goals by club, season and competition
Club	Season	League			League Cup		Domestic Cup		International		Total	
Club	Season	Division	Apps	Goals	Apps	Goals	Apps	Goals	Apps	Goals	Apps	Goals
SV Wilhelmshaven	2011–12	Regionalliga Nord	1	0	0	0	0	0	—	—	1	0
FC Edmonton	2013	NASL	3	0	0	0	1	0	—	—	4	0
FC Edmonton	2014	NASL	19	1	0	0	4	1	—	—	23	2
FC Edmonton	2015	NASL	15	1	0	0	2	0	—	—	17	2
FC Edmonton	Total		37	2	0	0	7	1	0	0	44	3
Career total			38	2	0	0	7	1	0	0	45	3
