= Sadi Jalali =

Canadian soccer player (born 1995)

Personal information
- Date of birth: June 6, 1995 (age 31)
- Place of birth: New Delhi, India
- Height: 1.80 m (5 ft 11 in)
- Position: Forward

Youth career
- 2011–2012: Edmonton Juventus/FC Kaiserslautern
- 2012: Whitecaps FC Residency
- 2012–2013: FC Edmonton

College career
Years	Team	Apps	(Gls)
2016	NAIT Ooks	8	(5)

Senior career*
Years	Team	Apps	(Gls)
2013–2016	FC Edmonton	25	(3)

International career
2011	Canada U17	7	(2)
2014	Canada U20	5	(1)
- * Club domestic league appearances and goals as of 22:13; 29 July 2016 (UTC)

Sadi Jalali (born June 6, 1995) is a former professional soccer player who last played as a forward for FC Edmonton in the North American Soccer League. Born in India, he represented Canada at youth level.

== Career ==
=== Early career ===
Born in New Delhi, India to Afghanistan parents, Jalali moved to Quebec City, Quebec when he was only one year old. He then moved to Richmond, British Columbia when he was three years old and then to Edmonton, Alberta when he was five years old. While growing up, Jalali played soccer, basketball, and volleyball. He started playing club soccer for Millwoods Soccer Association. He then spent three seasons at Edmonton Juventus before spending six months with the Vancouver Whitecaps FC Residency.

=== FC Edmonton ===
After spending time with FC Edmonton as a reserve player, Jalali signed a professional contract with the North American Soccer League side on 20 February 2013. He then made his professional debut for Edmonton in a league match on 13 April 2013 against the Carolina RailHawks at WakeMed Soccer Park, in which he came on as a 74th-minute substitute for Michael Cox as Edmonton went on to lose the match 2–1. In September 2014, FC Edmonton announced Jalali had signed a contract extension to keep him at the club. In July 2016 FC Edmonton released him.

== International ==
Jalali is eligible to represent Canada and Afghanistan (through his parents). Due to him representing Canada at the under-17 level meant that he had given up his Indian passport to acquire a Canadian one, thus he can not represent India unless he gives up Canadian citizenship.

Jalali represented the Canada U17 side for the first time during the 2011 CONCACAF U-17 Championship in which he made his debut for Canada on 17 February 2011 against Barbados' U17s and even scored his first international goal in that match as Canada went on to win 8–0. Jalali would eventually win a silver-medal in that tournament as Canada finished in 2nd place behind the United States. He would then go on to represent Canada at the 2011 FIFA U-17 World Cup in which he scored for Canada against England's U17s on 22 June 2011 in a match that would end 2–2 and thus Canada's chances of advancing out of the group in the top 2. Jalali was named to the U20 squad that went to the 2014 Milk Cup, where he scored a goal in the second game of the tournament against China.

== Personal life ==
=== Legal trouble ===
In August 2016 Sadi and his brother Saidkheyam were arrested by members of the Alberta Law Enforcement Response Team in separate traffic stops. Investigators alleged the pair were in possession of cocaine, cash, and a 9-mm handgun.

== Career statistics ==
As of 24 August 2015

Season	Club	League	League		Canadian Cup		Other		CONCACAF		Total	
Season	Club	League	Apps	Goals	Apps	Goals	Apps	Goals	Apps	Goals	Apps	Goals
2013	FC Edmonton	NASL	14	0	2	0	0	0	0	0	16	0
2014	FC Edmonton	NASL	3	1	0	0	0	0	0	0	2	1
2015	FC Edmonton	NASL	8	1	1	0	0	0	0	0	9	1
2016	FC Edmonton	NASL	0	0	0	0	0	0	0	0	0	0
FC Edmonton Total			25	2	3	0	0	0	0	0	28	2
Career Total			25	2	3	0	0	0	0	0	28	2
