= 2017 FC Edmonton season =

FC Edmonton
2017 season
- Owner: Dave Fath; Tom Fath
- Head Coach: Colin Miller
- Stadium: Clarke Stadium
- NASL: Spring: 7th Fall: 7th Combined: 7th
- 2017 Canadian Championship: Preliminary round
- Top goalscorer: Tomi Ameobi; Dustin Corea (6)
- Highest home attendance: 4,096 (12 Jun v. Fort Lauderdale)
- Lowest home attendance: 3,258 (9 Oct v. Tampa Bay)
- Average home league attendance: League: 3,406; All: 3,360
Home colors	Away colors

The 2017 FC Edmonton season was the club's seventh season of existence. The club would play in North American Soccer League, the second tier of the American soccer pyramid. It would also be the clubs last in the NASL before taking an 8-month hiatus before joining the CPL ahead of its inaugural season in 2019.

== Roster ==
As of match played 1 October 2017

No.	Name	Nationality	Position	Date of birth (age)	Signed from	Signed in	Contract ends	Apps.	Goals
Goalkeepers
1	Chris Konopka	(United States)	GK	14 April 1985 (age 41)	Portland Timbers	2017		9	0
21	Tyson Farago	(Canada)	GK	1 May 1991 (age 35)	WSA Winnipeg	2014		20	0
29	Nathan Ingham	(Canada)	GK	27 June 1993 (age 33)	K-W United	2016		6	0
Defenders
2	Shawn Nicklaw	(Guam)	DF	15 April 1989 (age 37)	Jacksonville Armada	2016		46	0
3	Allan Zebie	(Canada)	DF	29 May 1993 (age 33)	NAIT Ooks	2015		57	1
4	Papé Diakité	(Senegal)	DF	22 December 1992 (age 33)	Royal Antwerp	2016		54	3
5	Albert Watson	(Northern Ireland)	DF	8 September 1985 (age 41)	Linfield	2013		134	5
6	Nikolas Ledgerwood	(Canada)	DF	16 January 1985 (age 41)	Energie Cottbus	2016		49	2
13	Karsten Smith	(Canada)	DF	13 November 1988 (age 37)	Pittsburgh Riverhounds	2016		14	0
15	Marko Aleksic	(Canada)	DF	10 September 1996 (age 30)	Academy	2014		4	0
27	Netan Sansara	(England)	DF	3 August 1989 (age 37)	Fredrikstad	2017		14	0
Midfielders
7	Ben McKendry	(Canada)	MF	25 March 1993 (age 33)	loan from Vancouver Whitecaps	2017		9	0
9	Ben Fisk	(Canada)	MF	4 February 1993 (age 33)	Fabril	2016		40	3
10	Mauro Eustáquio	(Canada)	MF	10 February 1993 (age 33)	Ottawa Fury	2017		14	1
11	Dustin Corea	(El Salvador)	MF	21 March 1992 (age 34)	FAS	2015		66	8
12	Pedro Galvão	(Portugal)	MF	18 March 1989 (age 37)	Gil Vicente	2016		29	0
14	Sainey Nyassi	(The Gambia)	MF	31 January 1989 (age 37)	RoPS	2015		74	7
20	Nico di Biase	(Argentina)	MF	9 December 1988 (age 37)	Club Blooming	2016		21	0
25	Adam Straith	(Canada)	MF	11 September 1990 (age 36)	Fredrikstad	2017		13	1
Forwards
16	Daryl Fordyce	(Northern Ireland)	FW	2 January 1987 (age 39)	FC Cincinnati	2017		118	33
18	Tomi Ameobi	(England)	FW	16 August 1988 (age 38)	Whitley Bay	2014		107	26
23	Jake Keegan	(United States)	FW	21 April 1991 (age 35)	Galway United	2016		42	7
Left During the Season
8	Sabri Khattab	(Norway)	MF	12 January 1990 (age 36)	Kvik Halden	2017		12	0
22	Dean Shiels	(Northern Ireland)	MF	1 February 1985 (age 41)	Dundalk	2017		14	1

== Transfers ==
=== Winter ===
In: Note: Flags indicate national team as defined under FIFA eligibility rules; some limited exceptions apply. Players may hold more than one non-FIFA nationality.

No.	Pos.	Nation	Player
1	GK	USA	Chris Konopka (from (United States) Portland Timbers)
8	MF	NOR	Sabri Khattab (from (Norway) Kvik Halden)
10	MF	CAN	Mauro Eustáquio (from (Canada) Ottawa Fury)
22	MF	NIR	Dean Shiels (from (Republic of Ireland) Dundalk)
25	MF	CAN	Adam Straith (from (Norway) Fredrikstad)
27	DF	ENG	Netan Sansara (from (Norway) Fredrikstad)

Out: Note: Flags indicate national team as defined under FIFA eligibility rules; some limited exceptions apply. Players may hold more than one non-FIFA nationality.

No.	Pos.	Nation	Player
1	GK	USA	Matt Van Oekel (to (United States) Real Salt Lake)
7	MF	HON	Cristian Raudales
9	FW	CAN	Sadi Jalali
16	FW	NIR	Daryl Fordyce (to (United States) FC Cincinnati)
20	MF	BRA	Gustavo
24	DF	USA	Johann Smith
26	MF	CAN	Shamit Shome (to (Canada) Montreal Impact)
44	DF	ENG	Adam Eckersley (to (Scotland) St Mirren)

=== Summer ===
In: Note: Flags indicate national team as defined under FIFA eligibility rules; some limited exceptions apply. Players may hold more than one non-FIFA nationality.

No.	Pos.	Nation	Player
7	MF	CAN	Ben McKendry (loan from (United States) Vancouver Whitecaps)
16	FW	NIR	Daryl Fordyce (from (United States) Cincinnati)

Out: Note: Flags indicate national team as defined under FIFA eligibility rules; some limited exceptions apply. Players may hold more than one non-FIFA nationality.

No.	Pos.	Nation	Player
8	MF	NOR	Sabri Khattab (to (Norway) Elverum)
22	MF	NIR	Dean Shiels (to (Scotland) Dunfermline Athletic)

== Competitions ==
=== NASL Spring season ===
==== Standings ====
Pos	Team	Pld	W	D	L	GF	GA	GD	Pts	Qualification
1	Miami FC (S)	16	11	3	2	33	11	+22	36	Playoffs
2	San Francisco Deltas	16	7	5	4	17	20	−3	26	
3	New York Cosmos	16	6	6	4	22	21	+1	24	
4	Jacksonville Armada	16	6	6	4	17	16	+1	24	
5	North Carolina FC	16	6	3	7	21	22	−1	21	
6	Indy Eleven	16	4	8	4	21	22	−1	20	
7	FC Edmonton	16	4	1	11	11	21	−10	13	
8	Puerto Rico FC	16	1	6	9	19	28	−9	9	

Source: NASL
Rules for classification: 1) points; 2) total goal differential; 3) total goals scored; 4) head-to-head record; 5) away goal differential; 6) away goals scored
(S) Spring season champion

==== Results summary ====
Overall								Home						Away					
Pld	W	D	L	GF	GA	GD	Pts	W	D	L	GF	GA	GD	W	D	L	GF	GA	GD
16	4	1	11	11	21	−10	13	3	0	5	6	8	−2	1	1	6	5	13	−8

Last updated: 15 July 2017.
Source: Match reports

==== Results by round ====
Round	1	2	3	4	5	6	7	8	9	10	11	12	13	14	15	16
Ground	A	H	A	H	A	A	H	H	A	A	H	A	H	A	H	H
Result	L	L	L	W	L	D	L	W	L	W	L	L	L	L	W	L
Position	8	8	8	8	8	7	7	6	8	6	6	7	7	7	7	7

Updated to match(es) played on 15 July 2017. Source: Match reports
A = Away; H = Home; W = Win; D = Draw; L = Loss

==== Matches ====
2 April 2017 1	Jacksonville Armada	1 – 0	FC Edmonton	Jacksonville
14:00 MT	Glenn (yellow card) 13'; Maripuu (yellow card) 63'; George (yellow card) 69'; Banks 77'; Blake (yellow card) 84'	Report		Stadium: Hodges Stadium; Attendance: 3,472; Referee: Rubiel Vazquez

9 April 2017 2	FC Edmonton	0 – 1	Jacksonville Armada	Edmonton
19:00 MT	Sansara (yellow card) 75'	Report	Steinberger 7'; Beckie (yellow card) 37'	Stadium: Clarke Stadium; Attendance: 3,269; Referee: Juan Marquez

16 April 2017 3	North Carolina	3 – 1	FC Edmonton	Cary
17:30 MT	Laing 4'; Albadawi 23'; Fondy 48'	Report	Ameobi 71'	Stadium: WakeMed Soccer Park; Attendance: 4,293; Referee: Marcos de Oliveira

22 April 2017 4	FC Edmonton	2 – 1	Puerto Rico	Edmonton
19:00 AST	Corea 61'; Shiels 70'	Report	Doyle (yellow card) 57'; Cristiano (yellow card) 62'; Quintillà 90+3'	Stadium: Clarke Stadium; Attendance: 3,582; Referee: Yursi Rudolf

29 April 2017 5	Miami	2 – 0	FC Edmonton	Miami
17:30 MT	Stefano (yellow card) 11' (goal) 64'; Poku 35'	Report	Zebie (yellow card) 60'; Nyassi (yellow card) 77'; Diakité (yellow card) 82'; Shiels (yellow card) 87'	Stadium: Riccardo Silva Stadium; Attendance: 6,112; Referee: Alex Chilowicz

6 May 2017 6	Indy Eleven	0 – 0	FC Edmonton	Indianapolis
17:30 MT	Ring (yellow card) 34' (yellow-red card) 90'	Report	Diakité (yellow card) 51'	Stadium: Michael Carroll Stadium; Attendance: 7,159; Referee: Chipalo Street

14 May 2017 7	FC Edmonton	0 – 1	San Francisco Deltas	Edmonton
14:00 MT	Nyassi 55'; Sansara (yellow card) 79'; Ledgerwood (yellow card) 88'	Report	Attakora (yellow card) 12'; Portilla 89'	Stadium: Clarke Stadium; Attendance: 2,968; Referee: Alain Ruch

27 May 2017 8	FC Edmonton	2 – 1	Indy Eleven	Edmonton
19:00 MT	Corea 27' (pen.); Straith 45+3'; Sansara (yellow card) 59'; Ameobi (yellow card) 73'	Report	Falvey (yellow card) 10'; Torrado (yellow card) 25'; Plumhoff 80'	Stadium: Clarke Stadium; Attendance: 4,096; Referee: Dave Gantar

3 June 2017 9	Puerto Rico	3 – 0	Edmonton	Bayamón
17:30 AST	Gentile 25' (yellow card) 26'; H.Ramos 28'; Doyle (yellow card) 38'; Puerto 52'	Report	Sansara (yellow card) 32'; Smith (yellow card) 55'; Diakité (yellow card) 61'; Khattab (yellow card) 87'; Watson (yellow card) 90+1'	Stadium: Juan Ramón Loubriel Stadium; Attendance: 3,078; Referee: Javier Santos

7 June 2017 10	New York Cosmos	2 – 4	FC Edmonton	Brooklyn, New York
17:03 MT	Herrera 45+1'; Barnes (red card) 74'; Guerra (red card) 79'; Ayoze 90+4' (pen.)	Report	Diakité (yellow card) 60'; Nyassi 69'; Ameobi 72', 89'; Keegan 85'	Stadium: MCU Park; Attendance: 3,520; Referee: Geoff Gamble

11 June 2017 11	FC Edmonton	0 – 1	Miami	Edmonton
19:00 MT	Watson (yellow card) 9'; Nicklaw (yellow card) 51'	Report	Freeman (yellow card) 74'; Rennella 80'	Stadium: Clarke Stadium; Attendance: 3,872; Referee: David Barrie

17 June 2017 12	San Francisco Deltas	1 – 0	FC Edmonton	San Francisco
20:00 MT	Sandoval 40' (pen.); Heinemann (yellow card) 87'; Cruz (yellow card) 90+1'	Report	Ameobi (yellow card) 51'	Stadium: Kezar Stadium; Attendance: 1,894; Referee: Daniel Radford

24 June 2017 13	FC Edmonton	0 – 1	San Francisco Deltas	Edmonton
21:00 MT	Ameobi (yellow card) 45'; Nyassi (yellow card) 63'; Zebie (yellow card) 73'	Report	Nicklaw 7' (o.g.)	Stadium: Clarke Stadium; Attendance: 3,890; Referee: Pierre Luce Lauziere

1 July 2017 14	Jacksonville Armada	1 – 0	FC Edmonton	Jacksonville
19:00 EDT	Gebhard 79'; Rebellón (yellow card) 87'	Report	Nicklaw (yellow card) 45'; Zebie (yellow card) 52'; Ameobi (yellow card) 76'; Watson (yellow card) 78'	Stadium: Hodges Stadium; Attendance: 2,701; Referee: Malik Badawi

7 July 2017 15	FC Edmonton	2 – 1	North Carolina	Edmonton
19:00 MT	Diakité (yellow card) 30'; Watson (yellow card) 32'; Ameobi 77'; Eustáquio 80'	Report	Fortune 24'; J.Carranza (yellow card) 86'	Stadium: Clarke Stadium; Attendance: 3,438; Referee: Yusri Rudolf

16 July 2017 16	FC Edmonton	0 – 1	New York Cosmos	Edmonton
19:00 MT	Eustáquio (yellow card) 29'; Smith (yellow card) 62'; Watson (yellow card) 88'	Report	Calvillo 79'	Stadium: Clarke Stadium; Attendance: 4,096; Referee: Juan Marquez

=== NASL Fall season ===
==== Standings ====
Pos	Team	Pld	W	D	L	GF	GA	GD	Pts	Qualification
1	Miami FC (F)	16	10	3	3	28	17	+11	33	Playoffs
2	San Francisco Deltas	16	7	7	2	24	15	+9	28	
3	North Carolina FC	16	5	9	2	25	15	+10	24	
4	New York Cosmos	16	4	9	3	34	30	+4	21	
5	Jacksonville Armada	16	4	7	5	21	22	−1	19	
6	Puerto Rico FC	16	4	4	8	13	23	−10	16	
7	FC Edmonton	16	3	5	8	14	21	−7	14	
8	Indy Eleven	16	3	4	9	18	34	−16	13	

Source: NASL
Rules for classification: 1) points; 2) total goal differential; 3) total goals scored; 4) head-to-head record; 5) away goal differential; 6) away goals scored
(F) Fall season champion

==== Results summary ====
Overall								Home						Away					
Pld	W	D	L	GF	GA	GD	Pts	W	D	L	GF	GA	GD	W	D	L	GF	GA	GD
16	3	5	8	14	21	−7	14	1	2	5	5	11	−6	2	3	3	9	10	−1

Last updated: 28 October 2017.
Source: Match reports

==== Results by round ====
Round	1	2	3	4	5	6	7	8	9	10	11	12	13	14	15	16
Ground	H	A	H	H	A	A	H	H	A	H	H	A	A	H	A	A
Result	L	W	D	D	W	D	L	W	L	L	L	D	D	L	L	L
Position	7	4	4	6	3	2	4	3	4	4	5	5	5	7	7	7

Updated to match(es) played on 28 October 2017. Source: Match reports
A = Away; H = Home; W = Win; D = Draw; L = Loss

==== Matches ====
30 July 2017 17	FC Edmonton	1 – 2	Indy Eleven	Edmonton
14:00 MT	Ameobi 33'; McKendry (yellow card) 63'	Report	Goldsmith 7'; Zayed 41'; Torrado (yellow card) 66'; Smart (yellow card) 77'	Stadium: Clarke Stadium; Attendance: 3,285; Referee: David Barrie

5 August 2017 18	Indy Eleven	1 – 3	FC Edmonton	Indianapolis
17:30 MT	Torrado (yellow card) 52'; Vuković 66'; Ring (yellow card) 74'	Report	Ledgerwood (yellow card) 34'; Corea 53' (pen.), 73'; Watson 59'; Diakité (yellow card) 65'; Farago (yellow card) 83'; Nicklaw (yellow card) 90'	Stadium: Michael Carroll Stadium; Attendance: 9,072; Referee: Guido Gonzalez

11 August 2017 19	FC Edmonton	1 – 1	New York Cosmos	Edmonton
19:00 MT	Fordyce 45'; Corea (yellow card) 83'	Report	Ledesma 66'; Ayoze (yellow card) 81'; Guerra (yellow card) 84'; Moyal (yellow card) 87'	Stadium: Clarke Stadium; Attendance: 2,758; Referee: Alain Ruch

20 August 2017 20	FC Edmonton	1 – 1	Puerto Rico	Edmonton
14:00 MT	Ledgerwood (yellow card) 19' (yellow-red card) 90+4'; Fisk 45'; Zebie (yellow card) 48'; Fordyce (yellow card) 53'; Watson (yellow card) 72'; Eustáquio (yellow card) 90'	Report	Kavita (yellow card) 22'; Doyle 54'; Rivera (yellow card) 88'	Stadium: Clarke Stadium; Attendance: 3,414; Referee: Carol Chenard

26 August 2017 21	San Francisco Deltas	1 – 2	FC Edmonton	San Francisco
18:00 MT	Jordan (yellow card) 23'; Dagoberto 62' (pen.) (yellow card) 78'; Bekker (red card) 71'; Heinemann (yellow card) 88'; Gibson (yellow card) 89'	Report	Smith (yellow card) 6' (yellow-red card) 66'; Ameobi 30'; McKendry (yellow card) 48'; Zebie 64'; Nicklaw (yellow card) 87'	Stadium: Kezar Stadium; Attendance: 2,168; Referee: Alex Chilowicz

2 September 2017 22	North Carolina	1 – 1	FC Edmonton	Cary
17:30 MT	Ibeagha 4'	Report	Sylvestre 70' (o.g.)	Stadium: WakeMed Soccer Park; Attendance: 3,388; Referee: Marcos de Oliveira

10 September 2017 23	FC Edmonton	0 – 3	North Carolina	Edmonton
15:00 MT	Nicklaw (yellow card) 59'; Fisk (yellow card) 66'	Report	Albadawi 12'; Renan 21'; Miller 86'	Stadium: Clarke Stadium; Attendance: 3,549; Referee: Juan Marquez

17 September 2017 24	FC Edmonton	2 – 0	Indy Eleven	Edmonton
14:00 MT	Nyassi 31'; Corea 77' (pen.)	Report	Falvey (yellow card) 69'; Smart (yellow card) 80'	Stadium: Clarke Stadium; Attendance: 3,027; Referee: Pierre Lauziere

20 September 2017 25	Puerto Rico	v	FC Edmonton	Bayamón, Puerto Rico
18:30 MT				Stadium: Juan Ramón Loubriel Stadium

23 September 2017 26	San Francisco Deltas	2 – 1	FC Edmonton	San Francisco
19:00 MT	Burke 14'; Watson 35' (o.g.)	Report	Eustáquio (yellow card) 73'; Corea 80'	Stadium: Kezar Stadium; Attendance: 2,951; Referee: Ramy Touchan

1 October 2017 27	FC Edmonton	0 – 1	San Francisco Deltas	Edmonton
14:00 MT	Eustáquio (yellow card) 74'; Ledgerwood (yellow card) 88'	Report	Burke (yellow card) 42'; Teijsse 78'	Stadium: Clarke Stadium; Attendance: 2,231; Referee: David Barrie

6 October 2017 28	FC Edmonton	0 – 1	Jacksonville Armada	Edmonton
19:00 MT		Report	Banks (yellow card) 59'; Kilduff 68'; Ryden (yellow card) 88'	Stadium: Clarke Stadium; Attendance: 3,098; Referee: (Canada) Drew Fischer

14 October 2017 29	New York Cosmos	0 – 0	FC Edmonton	Brooklyn
17:00 MT	Calvillo (yellow card) 51'	Report	Eustáquio (yellow card) 23'	Stadium: MCU Park; Attendance: 6,818; Referee: (United States) Younes Marrakchi

18 October 2017 30	Jacksonville Armada	1 – 1	FC Edmonton	Jacksonville, Florida
17:00 MT	George (yellow card) 9'; Blake 39'; Jérôme (yellow card) 65'; Rebellón (yellow card) 79'	Report	Eustáquio (yellow card) 40'; Keegan 62'; Ledgerwood (yellow card) 83'; Diakité (yellow card) 83'; Ingham (yellow card) 90+3'	Stadium: Hodges Stadium; Attendance: 1,348; Referee: (United States) Daniel Radford

21 October 2017 31	FC Edmonton	0 – 2	Miami FC	Edmonton
19:00 MT	Dukuly (yellow card) 87' (yellow-red card)	Report	Stéfano 11'; Mares 64'	Stadium: Clarke Stadium; Attendance: 3,952; Referee: (United States) Juan Marquez

25 October 2017 25	Puerto Rico FC	2 – 0	FC Edmonton	Kissimmee, Florida
17:30 MT	Jordi Quintillà 6'; Ramos 16'; Rivera (yellow card) 37'	Report	McKendry (yellow card) 21' di Biase (yellow card) 30'; Diakité (yellow card) 84'	Stadium: Austin-Tindall Regional Park; Referee: (Canada) Geoff Gamble

28 October 2017 32	Miami FC	2 – 1	FC Edmonton	Miami
17:30 MT	Poku 53' 72'; Freeman (yellow card) 84'	Report	Fordyce 56' (pen.); McKendry (yellow card) 62'	Stadium: Riccardo Silva Stadium; Attendance: 6,217; Referee: (The Gambia) Baboucarr Jallow

=== Canadian Championship ===
3 May 2017 Preliminary round 1st leg	Ottawa Fury	1 – 0	FC Edmonton	Ottawa
17:30 MT	Edward (yellow card) 19'; Dos Santos (yellow card) 70'; Williams 89'	Report	Sansara (yellow card) 19'; Shiels (yellow card) 37'	Stadium: TD Place Stadium; Attendance: 2,567; Referee: Juan Marquez

10 May 2017 Preliminary round 2nd leg	FC Edmonton	2 – 3 (2 – 4 agg.)	Ottawa Fury	Edmonton
19:00 MT	Keegan 30'; Zebie (yellow card) 52'; Nyassi 61'; Diakité (yellow card) 62' (red card) 67'; Ameobi (yellow card) 74'	Report	Seoane 1'; Dos Santos 37' (pen.), 90+4'; McEleney (yellow card) 87'	Stadium: Clarke Stadium; Attendance: 2,591; Referee: David Barrie

== Squad statistics ==
As of match played 28 October 2017

=== Appearances and goals ===
No.	Pos	Nat	Player	Total		NASL Spring Season		NASL Fall Season		Canadian Championship	
No.	Pos	Nat	Player	Apps	Goals	Apps	Goals	Apps	Goals	Apps	Goals
1	GK	(United States) USA	Chris Konopka	9	0	9	0	0	0	0	0
3	DF	(Canada) CAN	Allan Zebie	24	1	11+1	0	10	1	2	0
4	DF	(Senegal) SEN	Papé Diakité	30	0	12	0	16	0	2	0
5	DF	(Northern Ireland) NIR	Albert Watson	29	1	14	0	12+1	1	2	0
6	DF	(Canada) CAN	Nikolas Ledgerwood	23	0	7+1	0	13	0	2	0
7	MF	(Canada) CAN	Ben McKendry	15	0	0	0	12+3	0	0	0
9	MF	(Canada) CAN	Ben Fisk	30	1	9+4	0	15+1	1	1	0
10	MF	(Canada) CAN	Mauro Eustáquio	18	1	7+2	1	6+3	0	0	0
11	MF	(El Salvador) ESA	Dustin Corea	24	6	11	2	7+4	4	2	0
12	MF	(Portugal) POR	Pedro Galvão	25	0	10+1	0	14	0	0	0
13	DF	(United States) USA	Karsten Smith	6	0	1+3	0	2	0	0	0
14	MF	(The Gambia) GAM	Sainey Nyassi	31	3	11+4	1	9+5	1	1+1	1
16	FW	(Northern Ireland) NIR	Daryl Fordyce	14	2	0	0	10+4	2	0	0
18	FW	(England) ENG	Tomi Ameobi	26	6	14+2	4	8	2	1+1	0
20	MF	(Argentina) ARG	Nico di Biase	15	0	2+3	0	5+4	0	0+1	0
21	GK	(Canada) CAN	Tyson Farago	18	0	1+1	0	14	0	2	0
22	DF	(Guam) GUM	Shawn Nicklaw	31	0	15+1	0	7+6	0	2	0
23	FW	(United States) USA	Jake Keegan	32	3	7+8	1	9+6	1	1+1	1
25	MF	(Liberia) LBR	Abraham Dukuly	3	0	0	0	0+3	0	0	0
26	FW	(Canada) CAN	David Doe	4	0	0	0	0+4	0	0	0
27	DF	(England) ENG	Netan Sansara	16	0	7	0	5+2	0	2	0
29	GK	(Canada) CAN	Nathan Ingham	8	0	6	0	2	0	0	0
Players away on loan:
Players who left FC Edmonton during the season:
8	MF	(Norway) NOR	Sabri Khattab	12	0	2+9	0	0	0	0+1	0
22	MF	(Northern Ireland) NIR	Dean Shiels	14	1	9+3	1	0	0	2	0
25	DF	(Canada) CAN	Adam Straith	13	1	11	1	0+1	0	0+1	0

=== Goal scorers ===
Place	Position	Nation	Number	Name	NASL Spring Season	NASL Fall Season	Canadian Championship	Total
1	FW	(England)	18	Tomi Ameobi	4	2	0	6
1	FW	(El Salvador)	11	Dustin Corea	2	4	0	6
3	MF	(The Gambia)	14	Sainey Nyassi	1	1	1	3
3	FW	(United States)	23	Jake Keegan	1	1	1	3
5	FW	(Northern Ireland)	16	Daryl Fordyce	0	2	0	2
6	MF	(Northern Ireland)	22	Dean Shiels	1	0	0	1
6	DF	(Canada)	25	Adam Straith	1	0	0	1
6	MF	(Canada)	10	Mauro Eustáquio	1	0	0	1
6	DF	(Northern Ireland)	5	Albert Watson	0	1	0	1
6	MF	(Canada)	9	Ben Fisk	0	1	0	1
6	DF	(Canada)	3	Allan Zebie	0	1	0	1
6				Own goal	0	1	0	1
TOTALS					11	14	2	27

=== Disciplinary record ===
Number	Nation	Position	Name	NASL Spring Season		NASL Fall Season		Canadian Championship		Total	
Number	Nation	Position	Name	Yellow card	Red card	Yellow card	Red card	Yellow card	Red card	Yellow card	Red card
2	(Guam)	DF	Shawn Nicklaw	3	0	3	0	0	0	6	0
3	(Canada)	DF	Allan Zebie	3	0	1	0	1	0	5	0
4	(Senegal)	DF	Papé Diakité	5	0	3	0	1	1	9	1
5	(Northern Ireland)	DF	Albert Watson	5	0	1	0	0	0	6	0
6	(Canada)	MF	Nikolas Ledgerwood	1	0	5	1	0	0	6	1
7	(Canada)	MF	Ben McKendry	1	0	3	0	0	0	4	0
8	(Norway)	MF	Sabri Khattab	1	0	0	0	0	0	1	0
9	(Canada)	MF	Ben Fisk	0	0	1	0	0	0	1	0
10	(Canada)	MF	Mauro Eustáquio	1	0	5	0	0	0	6	0
11	(El Salvador)	MF	Dustin Corea	0	0	1	0	0	0	1	0
13	(United States)	DF	Karsten Smith	2	0	2	1	0	0	4	1
14	(The Gambia)	MF	Sainey Nyassi	3	0	0	0	0	0	3	0
16	(Northern Ireland)	FW	Daryl Fordyce	0	0	1	0	0	0	1	0
18	(England)	FW	Tomi Ameobi	4	0	0	0	1	0	5	0
20	(Argentina)	MF	Nico di Biase	0	0	1	0	0	0	1	0
21	(Canada)	GK	Tyson Farago	0	0	1	0	0	0	1	0
22	(Northern Ireland)	MF	Dean Shiels	1	0	0	0	1	0	2	0
25	(United States)	MF	Abraham Dukuly	0	0	2	1	0	0	2	1
25	(Canada)	DF	Adam Straith	1	0	0	0	0	0	1	0
27	(England)	DF	Netan Sansara	4	0	0	0	1	0	5	0
29	(Canada)	GK	Nathan Ingham	0	0	1	0	0	0	1	0
			TOTALS	34	0	32	3	5	1	71	4
