= 2020 Hun Sen Cup =

Tournament details
- Country: Cambodia
- Teams: 29

Final positions
- Champions: Visakha FC
- Runners-up: Nagaworld FC

Tournament statistics
- Top goal scorer: Vuth Tola (6 goals)

Awards
- Best player: Chrerng Polroth

The 2020 Hun Sen Cup is the 14th season of the Hun Sen Cup, the premier football knockout tournament in Cambodia, for association football clubs in Cambodia involving Cambodian League and provincial teams organized by the Football Federation of Cambodia. Beoung Ket won the cup after beating Svay Rieng 5-4 on Penalty in the 2019 final. It was Beoung Ket's first time winning the cup. The competition is split into 2 stages with the first being the provincial stage before the national stage sees the 2020 C-League teams enter the competition.

The provincial stage started in February 2020.

== Format ==
=== Provincial stage ===
The provincial stage started in February 2020 and was contested between 17 teams across 5 groups. All of the 17 teams across represent their respective province, not just the city that the team plays in.

- Group stage: 17 teams are split into 5 groups (2 groups of 4 and 3 groups of 3). The group winners and the 3 best runners-up (does not count the matches vs 4th-placed team in group A and E) qualified for the knockout stage.
- Provincial Knockout Stage: 8 teams play in a single-elimination home & away matches, except the single-leg third-place playoff and final match. Top 4 teams will qualify for National Stage.

=== National Stage ===
The National Stage sees the 12 2020 C-League teams (except Bati Youth Football Academy) enter the competition, along with the top 4 teams in the provincial stage. 16 teams play in a single-elimination home & away matches, except the single-leg semi-finals, third-place playoff and final match. The winners will qualify for 2021 AFC Cup qualifying playoff stage.

== Provincial Group stage ==
=== Group A ===
Pos	Team	Pld	W	D	L	GF	GA	GD	Pts	Qualification
1	Kampong Chhnang FC	6	2	4	0	14	6	+8	10	Qualification for Provincial Knockout Stage
2	Pursat FC	6	2	4	0	12	5	+7	10	
3	Battambang FC	6	1	4	1	8	9	−1	7	
4	Banteay Meanchey FC	6	0	2	4	4	19	−15	2	

Updated to match(es) played on unknown. Source: https://cambodianfootball.com/hun-sen-cup/table-standing/

=== Group B ===
Pos	Team	Pld	W	D	L	GF	GA	GD	Pts	Qualification
1	Siem Reap Province FC	4	3	0	1	6	4	+2	9	Qualification for Provincial Knockout Stage
2	Preah Vihear FC	4	2	0	2	9	8	+1	6	
3	Kampong Thom FC	4	1	0	3	8	11	−3	3	

Updated to match(es) played on unknown. Source: https://cambodianfootball.com/hun-sen-cup/table-standing/

=== Group C ===
Pos	Team	Pld	W	D	L	GF	GA	GD	Pts	Qualification
1	Prey Veng FC	4	2	2	0	17	5	+12	8	Qualification for Provincial Knockout Stage
2	Tbong Khmum FC	4	2	2	0	9	5	+4	8	Qualification for Provincial Knockout Stage
3	Ratanakiri FC	4	0	0	4	6	21	−15	0	

Updated to match(es) played on unknown. Source: https://cambodianfootball.com/hun-sen-cup/table-standing/

=== Group D ===
Pos	Team	Pld	W	D	L	GF	GA	GD	Pts	Qualification
1	Kampong Speu FC	4	2	2	0	4	1	+3	8	Qualification for Provincial Knockout Stage
2	Kandal FC	4	1	3	0	7	2	+5	6	Qualification for Provincial Knockout Stage
3	Takeo FC	4	0	1	3	2	10	−8	1	

Updated to match(es) played on unknown. Source: https://cambodianfootball.com/hun-sen-cup/table-standing/

=== Group E ===
Pos	Team	Pld	W	D	L	GF	GA	GD	Pts	Qualification
1	Kep FC	6	4	1	1	21	11	+10	13	Qualification for Provincial Knockout Stage
2	Koh Kong FC	6	2	3	1	12	11	+1	9	Qualification for Provincial Knockout Stage
3	Sihanoukville FC	6	1	2	3	11	11	0	5	
4	Kampot FC	6	1	2	3	8	19	−11	5	

Updated to match(es) played on unknown. Source: https://cambodianfootball.com/hun-sen-cup/table-standing/

=== Ranking of second-placed teams ===
Pos	Grp	Team	Pld	W	D	L	GF	GA	GD	Pts	Qualification
1	C	Tbong Khmum FC	4	2	2	0	9	5	+4	8	Qualification for Provincial Knockout Stage
2	E	Koh Kong FC	4	2	1	1	11	10	+1	7	Qualification for Provincial Knockout Stage
3	D	Kandal FC	4	1	3	0	7	2	+5	6	Qualification for Provincial Knockout Stage
4	B	Preah Vihear FC	4	2	0	2	9	8	+1	6	
5	A	Pursat FC	4	0	4	0	3	3	0	4	

Updated to match(es) played on unknown. Source: https://cambodianfootball.com/hun-sen-cup/table-standing/

== Provincial Knockout Stage ==
=== Bracket ===
Quarter-finals
1	Siem Reap Province FC	3	1	4 (3)
8	Kandal FC	1	3	4 (1)
4	Prey Veng FC	5	3	8
5	Koh Kong FC	1	0	1
2	Kampong Speu FC	0	1	1
7	Tbong Khmum FC	2	1	3
3	Kep FC	4	2	6
6	Kampong Chhnang FC	3	1	4

Semi-finals
Siem Reap Province FC	0	0	0
Prey Veng FC	2	7	9
Tbong Khmum FC	2	3	5
Kep FC	1	1	2

Final
Prey Veng FC	1
Tbong Khmum FC	0

=== Quarter-finals ===
Winners will qualify for National Stage.

==== 1st leg ====
30 June 2020	Siem Reap Province FC	3 - 1	Kandal FC	Siem Reap Stadium, Siem Reap Province
15:00 UTC+07

30 June 2020	Prey Veng FC	5 - 1	Koh Kong FC	Prey Veng Stadium, Prey Veng
15:00 UTC+07

30 June 2020	Kampong Speu FC	0 - 2	Tbong Khmum FC	Kampong Speu Department of Education, Youth and Sport, Kampong Speu
15:00 UTC+07

30 June 2020	Kep FC	4 - 3	Kampong Chhnang FC	Kep Stadium, Kep
15:00 UTC+07

==== 2nd leg ====
7 July 2020	Kandal FC	3 - 1 (1-3 p)	Siem Reap Province FC	Kandal Stadium, Kandal
15:00 UTC+07

4-4 on aggregate. Siem Reap Province FC won on penalties.

7 July 2020	Koh Kong FC	0 - 3	Prey Veng FC	Koh Kong High School Stadium, Koh Kong
15:00 UTC+07

Prey Veng FC won 8-1 on aggregate.

8 July 2020	Tbong Khmum FC	1 - 1	Kampong Speu FC	Tbong Khmum
15:00 UTC+07

Tboung Khmum FC won 3-1 on aggregate.

8 July 2020	Kampong Chhnang FC	1 - 2	Kep FC	Kampong Tralach High School Stadium, Kampong Chhnang
15:00 UTC+07

Kep FC won 6-4 on aggregate.

=== Semi-finals ===
==== 1st leg ====
15 July 2020	Siem Reap Province FC	0 - 2	Prey Veng FC	Siem Reap Stadium, Siem Reap Province
15:00 UTC+07

15 July 2020	Tbong Khmum FC	2 - 1	Kep FC	Tbong Khmum
15:00 UTC+07

==== 2nd leg ====
22 July 2020	Prey Veng FC	7 - 0	Siem Reap Province FC	Prey Veng Stadium, Prey Veng
15:00 UTC+07

Prey Veng FC won 9-0 on aggregate.

22 July 2020	Kep FC	1 - 3	Tboung Khmum FC	Kep Stadium, Kep
15:00 UTC+07

Tboung Khmum FC won 5-2 on aggregate.

=== Final and third-place playoff ===
==== Third-place playoff ====
29 July 2020	Siem Reap Province FC	0 - 3	Kep FC	Phnom Penh
15:00 UTC+07			Sobyany Li 51'; Nacha Choeun 67', 90'	Stadium: National Stadium

==== Final ====
29 July 2020	Prey Veng FC	1 - 0	Tboung Khmum FC	National Stadium, Phnom Penh
18:00 UTC+07			Tola Wut 49'

== National Round of 16 ==
=== 1st leg ===
12 August 2020	Nagaworld FC	3 - 2	Electricite du Cambodge FC	Phnom Penh
18:00 UTC+07				Stadium: Army Stadium

13 August 2020	Preah Khan Reach Svay Rieng FC	1 - 0	Soltilo Angkor FC	Svay Rieng Province
18:00 UTC+07				Stadium: Svay Rieng Stadium

12 August 2020	Phnom Penh Crown FC	4 - 0	Asia Euro United FC	Phnom Penh
18:00 UTC+07				Stadium: RSN Stadium

12 August 2020	Kirivong Sok Sen Chey FC	0 - 0	National Police Commissary FC	Takeo Province
15:30 UTC+07				Stadium: Kirivong Stadium

26 August 2020	Tbong Khmum FC	1 - 4	Visakha FC
15:30 UTC+07

13 August 2020	Siem Reap Province FC	0 - 5	Boeung Ket FC	Siem Reap Province
15:30 UTC+07				Stadium: Siem Reap Stadium

12 August 2020	Tiffy Army FC	10 - 2	Kep FC	Phnom Penh
15:00 UTC+07				Stadium: Army Stadium

12 August 2020	Angkor Tiger FC	2 - 3	Prey Veng FC	Siem Reap Province
15:30 UTC+07				Stadium: SRU Stadium

=== 2nd leg ===
19 August 2020	Electricite du Cambodge FC	0 - 1	Nagaworld FC	Phnom Penh
15:30 UTC+07				Stadium: Army Stadium

Nagaworld won 4-2 on aggregate.

20 August 2020	Soltilo Angkor FC	0 - 2	Preah Khan Reach Svay Rieng FC	Svay Rieng Province
15:00 UTC+07				Stadium: Svay Rieng Stadium

Preah Khan Reach Svay Rieng won 3-0 on aggregate.

20 August 2020	Asia Euro United FC	0 - 6	Phnom Penh Crown FC	Phnom Penh
15:00 UTC+07				Stadium: RSN Stadium

Phnom Penh Crown won 10-0 on aggregate.

19 August 2020	National Police Commissary FC	1 - 1 (a.e.t.) (3-4 p)	Kirivong Sok Sen Chey FC	Takeo Province
15:30 UTC+07				Stadium: Kirivong Stadium

1-1 on aggregate. Kirivong Sok Sen Chey won 4-3 on penalties.

19 August 2020	Visakha FC	9 - 0	Tbong Khmum FC	Phnom Penh
18:00 UTC+07				Stadium: Prince Stadium

Visakha won 13-1 on aggregate.

20 August 2020	Boeung Ket FC	13 - 0	Siem Reap Province FC	Siem Reap Province
19:00 UTC+07				Stadium: Siem Reap Stadium

Boeung Ket won 18-0 on aggregate.

20 August 2020	Kep FC	1 - 4	Tiffy Army FC	Kep Province
15:30 UTC+07				Stadium: Kep Stadium

Tiffy Army won 14-3 on aggregate.

19 August 2020	Prey Veng FC	2 - 2	Angkor Tiger FC	Prey Veng Province
15:30 UTC+07				Stadium: Prey Veng Stadium

Prey Veng won 5-4 on aggregate.

== National Quarter-finals ==
=== 1st leg ===
27 August 2020	Tiffy Army FC	1 - 0	Prey Veng FC	Phnom Penh
18:00 UTC+07				Stadium: Army Stadium

29 August 2020	Nagaworld FC	2 - 2	Preah Khan Reach Svay Rieng FC	Phnom Penh
18:00 UTC+07	Kouch Sokumpheak 43'; Kouch Dani 49'		33' Nub Tola; 88' Hoy Phallin	Stadium: Army Stadium; Attendance: 0

29 August 2020	Phnom Penh Crown FC	2 - 1	Kirivong Sok Sen Chey FC	Phnom Penh
18:00 UTC+07				Stadium: RSN Stadium; Attendance: 0

30 August 2020	Boeung Ket FC	1 - 1	Visakha FC	Phnom Penh
15:30 UTC+07				Stadium: Cambodia Airway Stadium; Attendance: 0

=== 2nd leg ===
7 October 2020	Kirivong Sok Sen Chey FC	1 - 2	Phnom Penh Crown FC	Takeo Province
15:30 UTC+07				Stadium: Kirivong Stadium

Phnom Penh Crown won 4-2 on aggregate.

7 October 2020	Preah Khan Reach Svay Rieng FC	1 - 2	Nagaworld FC	Svay Rieng Province
18:00 UTC+07	Tieng Tiny 89'		21' Sos Suhana; 42' Khim Borey	Stadium: Svay Rieng Stadium; Attendance: 0

Nagaworld won 4-3 on aggregate.

8 October 2020	Prey Veng FC	4 - 3 (5 - 4 p)	Tiffy Army FC	Prey Veng Province
15:30 UTC+07				Stadium: Prey Veng Stadium

4-4 on aggregate. Prey Veng won 5-4 on penalties.

8 October 2020	Visakha FC	3 - 3 (4 - 3 p)	Boeung Ket FC	Phnom Penh
18:00 UTC+07				Stadium: Prince Stadium

4-4 on aggregate. Visakha won 4-3 on penalties.

== National Semi-finals ==
21 October 2020	Nagaworld FC	0 - 0 (3 - 1 p)	Phnom Penh Crown FC	Phnom Penh
18:00 UTC+07				Stadium: National Stadium

22 October 2020	Prey Veng FC	1 - 1 (8 - 9 p)	Visakha FC	Phnom Penh
18:00 UTC+07				Stadium: National Stadium

== National Third-place ==
7 November 2020	Phnom Penh Crown	2 - 4	Prey Veng	Phnom Penh
15:00 UTC+07	1' Brak Thiva; 45+1' Pov Ponvuthy	Report	33' Ky Ryna; 47' Pov Chanthet; 54' Voeun Va; 77' Vuth Tola	Stadium: National Stadium

== National Final match ==
The winner is guaranteed a spot for the 2021 AFC Cup playoffs.

7 November 2020	Nagaworld FC	0 - 2	Visakha FC	Phnom Penh
18:00 UTC+07			41' Keo Sokpheng; 57' Cheng Meng	Stadium: National Stadium

== Awards ==
- Top goal scorer : Vuth Tola of Prey Veng (6 goals)
- Player of the season : Chrerng Polroth of Visakha
- Goalkeeper of the Season : Keo Soksela of Visakha
- Coach of the season : Colum Curtis of Visakha
- Fair Play: Prey Veng

== Criticism ==
Tbong Khmum FC head coach, Phorn Raksmey Pich complained Prey Veng FC for using Visakha FC academy in the whole squad in provincial stage in an interview with BTV. He stated that "We (Tbong Khmum FC) already won the provincial stage because Prey Veng FC is not provincial team, they are Visakha FC academy!". His statement gained support by other provincial teams fans on social media.
