= 2016 FC Edmonton season =

FC Edmonton
2016 season
- Owner: Dave Fath; Tom Fath
- Head Coach: Colin Miller
- Stadium: Clarke Stadium
- NASL: Spring: 3rd Fall: - Combined: -
- Soccer Bowl: TBD
- Canadian Championship: Preliminary round
- Top goalscorer: League: Daryl Fordyce (6 goals); All: Daryl Fordyce (7 goals)
- Highest home attendance: 3,129 (12 Jun v. Fort Lauderdale)
- Lowest home attendance: 1,243 (9 Oct v. Tampa Bay)
- Average home league attendance: League: 2,060; All: 2,115
Home colors	Away colors

The 2016 FC Edmonton season was the club's sixth season of existence. The club played in North American Soccer League, the second tier of the American soccer pyramid.

== Roster ==
As of match played 24 April 2016

No.	Name	Nationality	Position	Date of birth (age)	Signed from	Signed in	Contract ends	Apps.	Goals
Goalkeepers
1	Matt Van Oekel	(United States)	GK	20 September 1986 (age 40)	Minnesota United	2015		33	0
21	Tyson Farago	(Canada)	GK	1 May 1991 (age 35)	Winnipeg Wesmen	2014		3	0
29	Nathan Ingham	(Canada)	GK	27 June 1993 (age 33)	K-W United	2016		0	0
Defenders
2	Allan Zebie	(Canada)	DF	29 May 1993 (age 33)	NAIT Ooks	2015		21	0
4	Papé Diakité	(Senegal)	DF	22 December 1992 (age 33)	(Belgium) Royal Antwerp	2016		4	0
5	Albert Watson	(Northern Ireland)	DF	8 September 1985 (age 41)	(Northern Ireland) Linfield	2013		84	3
13	Karsten Smith	(United States)	DF	13 November 1988 (age 37)	(United States) Pittsburgh Riverhounds	2016		0	0
24	Johann Smith	(United States)	DF	25 April 1987 (age 39)	(Australia) Cumberland United	2015		26	0
25	Marko Aleksic	(Canada)	DF	10 September 1996 (age 30)	Edmonton Academy	2014		2	0
44	Adam Eckersley	(England)	DF	7 September 1985 (age 41)	(Scotland) Hibernian	2016		1	0
Midfielders
6	Nikolas Ledgerwood	(Canada)	MF	16 January 1985 (age 41)	(Germany) Energie Cottbus	2016		4	0
7	Cristian Raudales	(Honduras)	MF	3 October 1989 (age 37)	(Germany) Schwarz-Weiß Rehden	2014		37	1
10	Pablo Cruz	(United States)	MF	30 December 1991 (age 34)	San Antonio Scorpions	2015		16	0
11	Dustin Corea	(El Salvador)	MF	21 March 1992 (age 34)	(El Salvador) FAS	2015		18	1
14	Sainey Nyassi	(The Gambia)	MF	31 January 1989 (age 37)	(Finland) RoPS	2015		29	4
20	Gustavo	(Brazil)	MF	7 July 1985 (age 41)	(Brazil) Murici	2016		1	0
26	Shamit Shome	(Canada)	MF	5 September 1997 (age 29)	Alberta Golden Bears	2016		2	0
Forwards
9	Sadi Jalali	(Canada)	FW	6 June 1995 (age 31)	Edmonton Academy	2013		28	2
16	Daryl Fordyce	(Northern Ireland)	FW	2 January 1987 (age 39)	(Northern Ireland) Linfield	2013		80	25
18	Tomi Ameobi	(England)	FW	16 August 1988 (age 38)	(England) Whitley Bay	2014		51	18
23	Jake Keegan	(United States)	FW	21 April 1991 (age 35)	(Republic of Ireland) Galway United	2016		4	1

=== Staff ===
- (Canada) Colin Miller – Head Coach
- (Canada) Rod Proudfoot – General Manager
- (Canada) Jeff Paulus – Assistant Coach
- (Canada) Darren Woloshen – Goalkeeping Coach
- (Canada) Andeas Morse – Team Administrator
- (Canada) Jose Jimenez – Athletic Therapist
- (Canada) Brandon Salter – Assistant Athletic Therapist
- (Canada) Dr. Terry De Freitas – Team Physician

== Transfers ==
=== Winter ===
Note: Flags indicate national team as has been defined under FIFA eligibility rules. Players may hold more than one non-FIFA nationality.

In: Note: Flags indicate national team as defined under FIFA eligibility rules; some limited exceptions apply. Players may hold more than one non-FIFA nationality.

No.	Pos.	Nation	Player
4	DF	SEN	Papé Diakité (from (Belgium) Royal Antwerp)
6	MF	CAN	Nikolas Ledgerwood (from (Germany) Energie Cottbus)
19	MF	GER	Jason Plumhoff (from (United States) Harrisburg City Islanders)
20	MF	BRA	Gustavo (from (Brazil) Murici)
23	FW	USA	Jake Keegan (from (Republic of Ireland) Galway United)
26	MF	CAN	Shamit Shome (from (Canada) Alberta Golden Bears)
29	GK	CAN	Nathan Ingham (from (Canada) K-W United)
44	DF	ENG	Adam Eckersley (from (Scotland) Hibernian)

Out: Note: Flags indicate national team as defined under FIFA eligibility rules; some limited exceptions apply. Players may hold more than one non-FIFA nationality.

No.	Pos.	Nation	Player
12	DF	TTO	Kareem Moses (to (United States) Carolina RailHawks)
17	MF	JAM	Lance Laing (to (United States) Minnesota United)

== Friendlies ==
4 March 2016	FC Edmonton Blue	2 – 0	FC Edmonton White	Saskatoon, Saskatchewan
10:00 EDT	Fordyce 30'; Keegan 65'	Summary		Stadium: Saskatoon Soccer Centre

13 March 2016	Partick Thistle (Scotland)	0 – 2	(Canada) Edmonton	Glasgow, Scotland
EDT		Report	Ledgerwood 18'; Keegan 49'	Stadium: Firhill Stadium

15 March 2016	Airdrieonians (Scotland)	1 – 2	(Canada) Edmonton	Airdrie, Scotland
EDT	Leighton 34'	Summary	Fordyce 11' (pen.), 35'	Stadium: Excelsior Stadium

18 March 2016	Newcastle United Reserves (England)	2 – 2	(Canada) Edmonton	Newcastle, England
EDT	Charman 10'; Roberts 31'	Report	Ameobi 37'; Jalali 72'	Stadium: Newcastle United Training Ground

22 March 2016	Queen's Park (Scotland)	0 – 1	(Canada) Edmonton	Glasgow, Scotland
EDT		Report	Ameobi 80'	Stadium: Lesser Hampden

== Competitions ==
=== NASL Spring season ===
==== Standings ====
Pos	Team	Pld	W	D	L	GF	GA	GD	Pts	Qualification
1	Indy Eleven (S)	10	4	6	0	15	8	+7	18	Playoffs
2	New York Cosmos	10	6	0	4	15	8	+7	18	
3	FC Edmonton	10	5	2	3	9	7	+2	17	
4	Minnesota United	10	5	1	4	16	12	+4	16	
5	Tampa Bay Rowdies	10	4	4	2	11	9	+2	16	
6	Fort Lauderdale Strikers	10	4	3	3	12	12	0	15	
7	Carolina RailHawks	10	4	2	4	11	13	−2	14	
8	Rayo OKC	10	3	3	4	11	12	−1	12	
9	Ottawa Fury	10	2	3	5	9	14	−5	9	
10	Jacksonville Armada	10	1	4	5	5	11	−6	7	
11	Miami FC	10	1	4	5	7	15	−8	7	

Source: NASL
Rules for classification: 1) points; 2) total goal differential; 3) total goals scored; 4) head-to-head record; 5) away goal differential; 6) away goals scored
(S) Spring season champion

==== Results summary ====
Overall								Home						Away					
Pld	W	D	L	GF	GA	GD	Pts	W	D	L	GF	GA	GD	W	D	L	GF	GA	GD
10	5	2	3	9	7	+2	17	4	0	1	7	4	+3	1	2	2	2	3	−1

Last updated: 12 June 2016.
Source: Match reports

==== Results by round ====
Round	1	2	3	4	5	6	7	8	9	10
Ground	A	H	A	H	A	A	H	H	A	H
Result	D	L	L	W	W	D	W	W	L	W
Position	5	9	10	8	6	6	4	2	3	3

Updated to match(es) played on 22 May 2016. Source: Match reports
A = Away; H = Home; W = Win; D = Draw; L = Loss

==== Matches ====
April 2, 2016 1	Rayo OKC	0 – 0	Edmonton	Yukon, Oklahoma
18:00 MDT (UTC−6)	Boateng (yellow card) 24'; Velásquez (yellow card) 34'	Summary	Watson (red card) 30'; Eckersley (yellow card) 67'; Ledgerwood (yellow card) 72'	Stadium: Miller Stadium; Attendance: 6,416; Referee: Nima Saghafi

April 10, 2016 2	Edmonton	0 – 2	Minnesota United	Edmonton, Alberta
14:00 MDT (UTC−6)	Roberts (yellow card) 47'	Summary	Speas 13', 55'; Vicentini (yellow card) 32'	Stadium: Clarke Stadium; Attendance: 2,731; Referee: David Barrie

April 16, 2016 3	Tampa Bay Rowdies	1 – 0	Edmonton	St. Petersburg, Florida
17:30 MST (UTC−07)	Guerra (yellow card) 39'; Heinemann 73'; Avila (yellow card) 90+1'; Hristov (yellow card) 90+4'; Collins (yellow card) 90+5'	Summary	Edward (yellow card) 37'; Nyassi (yellow card) 90'; Ameobi (penalty missed)	Stadium: Al Lang Stadium; Attendance: 4,429; Referee: Marcos de Oliveira

April 24, 2016 4	Edmonton	2 – 0	Ottawa Fury	Edmonton, Alberta
14:00 MST (UTC−07)	Watson 46'; Keegan 69'; Raudales (yellow card) 76'	Summary	Bailey (yellow card) 56'; Timbó (yellow card) 67'	Stadium: Clarke Stadium; Attendance: 1,500; Referee: Yusri Rudolf

May 4, 2016 5	Jacksonville Armada	0 – 1	Edmonton	Jacksonville, Florida
16:30 MST (UTC−07)	George (yellow card) 23'; Keita (yellow card) 85'; Eloundou (yellow card) 90+3'	Summary	Edward (yellow card) 26'; Diakité 64'; Van Oekel (yellow card) 87'	Stadium: Community First Park; Attendance: 3,517; Referee: Rosendo Mendoza

May 7, 2016 6	Indy Eleven	1 – 1	Edmonton	Indianapolis, Indiana
17:30 MST (UTC−07)	Janicki 22'; Palmer (yellow card) 68'; Larrea (yellow card) 71'	Summary	Ledgerwood (yellow card) 30'; Keegan 37' (yellow card) 78'	Stadium: Carroll Stadium; Attendance: 7,415; Referee: Nima Saghafi

May 15, 2016 7	Edmonton	2 – 1	New York Cosmos	Edmonton, Alberta
14:00 MST (UTC−07)	Plumhoff 13'; Ameobi (yellow card) 41'; Cruz (yellow card) 66'; Diakité 74'; Corea (yellow card) 81'; Van Oekel (yellow card) 90+4'	Summary	Orozco 22' (yellow card) 90'; Arango (yellow card) 60'; García (yellow card) 74'	Stadium: Clarke Stadium; Attendance: 2,688; Referee: Yusri Rudolf

May 22, 2016 8	Edmonton	1 – 0	Carolina RailHawks	Edmonton, Alberta
14:00 MST (UTC−07)	Ledgerwood (yellow card) 21'; Ameobi (yellow card) 34'; Fordyce 79' (pen.)	Summary	Black (yellow card) 34'; Tobin (yellow card) 78'	Stadium: Clarke Stadium; Attendance: 1,338; Referee: Francis Latulippe

May 28, 2016 9	Miami	1 – 0	Edmonton	Miami, Florida
18:00 MST (UTC−07)	Martínez 67'	Summary	Ledgerwood (yellow card) 55'; Diakité (yellow card) 63'; Eckersley (yellow card) 75'	Stadium: FIU Stadium; Attendance: 1,229; Referee: Jaime Herrera

June 12, 2016 10	Edmonton	2 – 1	Fort Lauderdale Strikers	Edmonton, Alberta
14:00 MST (UTC−07)	Keegan 12', 31'; Diakité (yellow card) 57'; Ledgerwood (yellow card) 62'; Eckersley (yellow card) 84'; Ameobi (yellow card) 90+2'	Summary	Agbossoumonde (yellow card) 34'; PC 58' (pen.); Restrepo (yellow card) 63'	Stadium: Clarke Stadium; Attendance: 3,129; Referee: Pierre-Luc Lauziere

=== NASL Fall season ===
==== Standings ====
Pos	Team	Pld	W	D	L	GF	GA	GD	Pts	Qualification
1	New York Cosmos (F)	22	14	5	3	44	21	+23	47	Playoffs
2	Indy Eleven	22	11	4	7	36	25	+11	37	
3	FC Edmonton	22	10	6	6	16	14	+2	36	
4	Rayo OKC	22	9	8	5	28	21	+7	35	
5	Miami FC	22	9	6	7	31	27	+4	33	
6	Fort Lauderdale Strikers	22	7	5	10	19	28	−9	26	
7	Carolina RailHawks	22	7	5	10	25	35	−10	26	
8	Minnesota United	22	6	7	9	25	25	0	25	
9	Puerto Rico	22	5	9	8	19	31	−12	24	
10	Tampa Bay Rowdies	22	5	8	9	29	32	−3	23	
11	Jacksonville Armada	22	5	8	9	25	35	−10	23	
12	Ottawa Fury	22	5	7	10	23	26	−3	22	

Source: NASL
Rules for classification: 1) points; 2) total goal differential; 3) total goals scored; 4) head-to-head record; 5) away goal differential; 6) away goals scored
(F) Fall season champion

==== Results summary ====
Overall								Home						Away					
Pld	W	D	L	GF	GA	GD	Pts	W	D	L	GF	GA	GD	W	D	L	GF	GA	GD
22	10	6	6	16	14	+2	36	8	2	1	10	4	+6	2	4	5	6	10	−4

Last updated: 28 October 2016.
Source: Match reports

==== Results by round ====
Round	1	2	3	4	5	6	7	8	9	10	11	12	13	14	15	16	17	18	19	20	21	22
Ground	A	H	H	A	H	H	A	H	A	H	A	H	H	A	A	A	H	H	A	A	H	A
Result	D	W	W	L	W	W	W	W	W	D	D	L	D	D	L	D	W	W	L	L	W	L
Position	3	3	4	5	3	2	2	2	1	2	2	2	3	2	3	4	2	2	2	2	3	3

Updated to match(es) played on 28 October 2016. Source: Match reports
A = Away; H = Home; W = Win; D = Draw; L = Loss

==== Matches ====
July 2, 2016 1	Rayo OKC	1 – 1	Edmonton	Yukon, Oklahoma
19:00 MDT (UTC−6)	Findley 33' van Schaik (yellow card) 39'	Summary	Salgueiro (yellow card) 83'; Salgueiro 90+3'	Stadium: Miller Stadium; Attendance: 4,257; Referee: Alex Chilowicz

July 10, 2016 2	Edmonton	1 – 0	Fort Lauderdale Strikers	Edmonton, Alberta
14:00 MST (UTC−07)	Shome (yellow card) 20'; Diakité (yellow card) 41'; Ledgerwood (yellow card) 44'; Fordyce 71'	Summary	Pineda (yellow card) 49'; PC (yellow card) 63'; James (yellow card) 78'	Stadium: Clarke Stadium; Attendance: 2,098; Referee: Yusri Rudolf

July 17, 2016 3	Edmonton	1 – 0	Ottawa Fury	Edmonton, Alberta
14:00 MST (UTC−07)	Diakité (yellow card) 54'; Diakité (yellow card) 60' (red card); Ledgerwood 82'	Summary		Stadium: Clarke Stadium; Attendance: 2,861; Referee: David Barrie

July 23, 2016 4	Indy Eleven	1 – 0	Edmonton	Indianapolis, Indiana
17:30 MST (UTC−07)	Janicki 13'; Ring (yellow card) 59'	Summary	Ledgerwood (yellow card) 78'	Stadium: Carroll Stadium; Attendance: 8,119; Referee: Daniel Radford

July 27, 2016 5	Edmonton	2 – 1	New York Cosmos	Edmonton, Alberta
19:00 MST (UTC−07)	Ledgerwood 79'; Fordyce 90+1'	Summary	Arango 6'; García (yellow card) 22'; Freeman (yellow card) 45'; Diosa (yellow card) 77'	Stadium: Clarke Stadium; Attendance: 2,104; Referee: Alain Ruch

July 31, 2016 6	Edmonton	1 – 0	Carolina RailHawks	Edmonton, Alberta
14:00 MST (UTC−07)	Keegan 66'	Summary	Mensing (yellow card) 61'; Beckie (yellow card) 74' da Luz (yellow card) 79'	Stadium: Clarke Stadium; Attendance: 1,904; Referee: Pierre-Luc Lauziere

August 6, 2016 7	Puerto Rico	0 – 1	Edmonton	Bayamón, Puerto Rico
17:30 MST (UTC−07)	Del Campo (yellow card) 6'	Summary	Eckersley (yellow card) 22'; Nicklaw (yellow card) 28'; Ameobi 74'	Stadium: Juan Ramón Loubriel Stadium; Attendance: 3,307; Referee: William Anderson

August 14, 2016 8	Edmonton	1 – 0	Minnesota United	Edmonton, Alberta
14:00 MDT (UTC−6)	Ledgerwood (yellow card) 38'; Ameobi 46'	Summary	Ibson (yellow card) 37'; Calvano (yellow card) 74'; Brovsky (yellow card) 90+3'	Stadium: Clarke Stadium; Attendance: 2,249; Referee: Juan Márquez

August 20, 2016 9	Tampa Bay Rowdies	0 – 1	Edmonton	St. Petersburg, Florida
17:30 MST (UTC−07)	Chavez (yellow card) 35'	Summary	Nicklaw (yellow card) 16'; Watson (yellow card) 69'; Fordyce 74' (pen.); Fordyce (yellow card) 84'; Diakité (yellow card) 90+2'	Stadium: Al Lang Stadium; Attendance: 4,596; Referee: Guido Gonzales Jr.

August 28, 2016 10	Edmonton	0 – 0	Puerto Rico	Edmonton, Alberta
14:00 MST (UTC−07)	Eckersley (yellow card) 31'; Nyassi (red card) 86'; Nicklaw (yellow card) 90+3'	Summary	Nurse (yellow card) 42'; Soria (yellow card) 88'	Stadium: Clarke Stadium; Attendance: 2,007; Referee: Yusri Rudolf

September 2, 2016 11	Ottawa Fury	2 – 2	Edmonton	Ottawa, Ontario
17:00 MST (UTC−07)	Stewart 2'; Eustáquio (yellow card) 23'; Tissot 36'; Timbó (yellow card) 54'; Alves (yellow card) 83'; Gentile (yellow card) 90'	Summary	Di Biase (yellow card) 18'; Fordyce 42'; Nicklaw (yellow card) 60'; Fordyce 62'	Stadium: TD Place Stadium; Attendance: 4,956; Referee: Juan Márquez

September 11, 2016 12	Edmonton	0 – 2	Miami	Edmonton, Alberta
14:00 MST (UTC−07)	Eckersley (yellow card) 76'	Summary	Cvitanich 14'; Poku (yellow card) 52'; Rennella 71'; Vega (yellow card) 87'	Stadium: Clarke Stadium; Attendance: 1,526; Referee: David Barrie

September 14, 2016 13	Edmonton	0 – 0	Rayo OKC	Edmonton, Alberta
19:00 MDT (UTC−6)		Summary	Chávez (yellow card) 34'; Menjivar (yellow card) 60'	Stadium: Clarke Stadium; Attendance: 1,568; Referee: David Gantar

September 17, 2016 14	New York Cosmos	0 – 0	Edmonton	Hempstead, New York
17:00 MST (UTC−07)		Summary	Nyassi (yellow card) 25'; Watson (yellow card) 54'	Stadium: James M. Shuart Stadium; Attendance: 3,723; Referee: Mark Kadlecik

September 24, 2016 15	Carolina RailHawks	1 – 0	Edmonton	Cary, North Carolina
17:30 MST (UTC−07)	da Luz 34'; Miller (yellow card) 53'; Miller (yellow card) 90+1' (red card)	Summary	Ledgerwood (yellow card) 24'; Watson (yellow card) 49'	Stadium: WakeMed Soccer Park; Attendance: 4,746; Referee: Mathieu Bourdeau

September 28, 2016 16	Jacksonville Armada	0 – 0	Edmonton	Jacksonville, Florida
17:00 MST (UTC−07)	Scaglia (yellow card) 23'	Summary	Ledgerwood (yellow card) 35'; Eckersley (yellow card) 55'; Di Biase (yellow card) 90'	Stadium: Community First Park; Attendance: 2,537; Referee: Rubiel Vazquez

October 2, 2016 17	Edmonton	2 – 1	Indy Eleven	Edmonton, Alberta
14:00 MST (UTC−07)	Diakité (yellow card) 68'; Diakité 80'; Fisk 90+4'	Summary	Palmer (yellow card) 54'; Zayed 56'	Stadium: Clarke Stadium; Attendance: 1,307; Referee: David Barrie

October 9, 2016 18	Edmonton	1 – 0	Tampa Bay Rowdies	Edmonton, Alberta
14:00 MST (UTC−07)	Fisk 13'; Eckersley (yellow card) 30'	Summary	PC (yellow card) 72'	Stadium: Clarke Stadium; Attendance: 1,243; Referee: Juan Márquez

October 12, 2016 19	Fort Lauderdale Strikers	1 – 0	Edmonton	Lauderhill, Florida
17:30 MST (UTC−07)	Moura 11'; Sandoval (yellow card) 45'	Summary	Galvao (yellow card) 19'; Fordyce (yellow card) 55'	Stadium: Central Broward Regional Park; Attendance: 418; Referee: Marcos de Oliveira

October 15, 2016 20	Minnesota United	3 – 1	Edmonton	Blaine, Minnesota
18:00 MDT (UTC−6)	Ramirez 23'; Ramirez 53'; Pinho 84'	Summary	Watson 16'; Diakité (yellow card) 51'; Fordyce (yellow card) 58'	Stadium: National Sports Center; Attendance: 8,059; Referee: Alejandro Mariscal

October 23, 2016 21	Edmonton	1 – 0	Jacksonville Armada	Edmonton, Alberta
14:00 MST (UTC−07)	K. Smith (yellow card) 12'; Nicklaw (yellow card) 90+2'; Fordyce 90+7' (pen.)	Summary	Jérôme (yellow card) 73'	Stadium: Clarke Stadium; Attendance: 2,705; Referee: Yusri Rudolf

October 28, 2016 22	Miami	1 – 0	Edmonton	Miami, Florida
18:00 MST (UTC−07)	Martínez 65'; Poku (yellow card) 82'	Summary	Galvao (yellow card) 81'	Stadium: FIU Stadium; Attendance: 8,756; Referee: Rubiel Vazquez

=== NASL Playoffs ===
November 5, 2016 Semi-finals	Indy Eleven	1 – 0	Edmonton	Indianapolis, Indiana
12:00 MST (UTC−07)	Ubiparipović 63'	Summary	Diakité (yellow card) 83'; Eckersley (yellow card) 90+2'	Stadium: Carroll Stadium; Attendance: 9,702; Referee: Sorin Stoica

=== Canadian Championship ===
May 11, 2016 Preliminary Round 1st leg	Edmonton	0 – 3	Ottawa Fury	Edmonton, Alberta
19:00 MST (UTC−07)	Ledgerwood (yellow card) 61'; Fordyce (yellow card) 75'	Summary	Timbó 12'; Bailey (yellow card) 31'; Haworth 69'; Vered 74'; Olivera (yellow card) 86'	Stadium: Clarke Stadium; Attendance: 3,000; Referee: Alain Ruch

May 18, 2016 Preliminary Round 2nd leg	Ottawa Fury	0 – 2 (3 – 2 agg.)	Edmonton	Ottawa, Ontario
17:30 MST (UTC−07)	Steele (yellow card) 54'; Bailey (yellow card) 55'; Timbó (yellow card) 90+1'	Summary	Diakité (yellow card) 16'; Corea 26'; Watson (yellow card) 38'; Eckersley 45'	Stadium: TD Place Stadium; Attendance: 3,946; Referee: Mathieu Bourdeau

== Squad statistics ==
As of Match played 5 November 2016

=== Appearances and goals ===
No.	Pos	Nat	Player	Total		NASL Spring Season		NASL Fall Season		NASL Playoffs		Canadian Championship	
No.	Pos	Nat	Player	Apps	Goals	Apps	Goals	Apps	Goals	Apps	Goals	Apps	Goals
1	GK	(United States) USA	Matt Van Oekel	32	0	10	0	19	0	1	0	2	0
2	DF	(Canada) CAN	Allan Zebie	12	0	2+4	0	4+1	0	0	0	1	0
4	DF	(Senegal) SEN	Papé Diakité	30	3	10	2	16+1	1	1	0	2	0
5	DF	(Northern Ireland) NIR	Albert Watson	30	2	9	1	18	1	1	0	2	0
6	MF	(Canada) CAN	Nikolas Ledgerwood	32	2	10	0	19	2	1	0	2	0
7	MF	(Honduras) HON	Cristian Raudales	16	0	5	0	4+7	0	0	0	0	0
9	MF	(Canada) CAN	Ben Fisk	16	2	0	0	10+5	2	0+1	0	0	0
10	MF	(United States) USA	Pablo Cruz	8	0	3+4	0	0	0	0	0	1	0
11	MF	(El Salvador) ESA	Dustin Corea	28	1	6+1	0	15+3	0	1	0	2	1
12	MF	(Portugal) POR	Pedro Galvao	9	0	0	0	1+8	0	0	0	0	0
13	DF	(United States) USA	Karsten Smith	8	0	0	0	7+1	0	0	0	0	0
14	MF	(The Gambia) GAM	Sainey Nyassi	23	0	5+1	0	8+7	0	1	0	1	0
16	FW	(Northern Ireland) NIR	Daryl Fordyce	33	7	9+1	1	20	6	1	0	2	0
18	FW	(England) ENG	Tomi Ameobi	33	2	6+2	0	20+2	2	1	0	1+1	0
20	MF	(Brazil) BRA	Gustavo Salgueiro	16	1	2+4	0	0+8	1	0	0	1+1	0
21	GK	(Canada) CAN	Tyson Farago	3	0	0	0	3	0	0	0	0	0
22	DF	(Guam) GUM	Shawn Nicklaw	21	0	0	0	20	0	1	0	0	0
23	FW	(United States) USA	Jake Keegan	34	5	7+3	4	14+7	1	0+1	0	1+1	0
24	DF	(United States) USA	Johann Smith	15	0	5+2	0	2+4	0	0	0	0+2	0
25	DF	(Canada) CAN	Marko Aleksic	2	0	0	0	2	0	0	0	0	0
26	MF	(Canada) CAN	Shamit Shome	28	0	3+3	0	15+5	0	1	0	1	0
27	MF	(Argentina) ARG	Nicolás Di Biase	12	0	0	0	6+6	0	0	0	0	0
44	DF	(England) ENG	Adam Eckersley	27	1	5	0	19	0	1	0	2	1
Players who left FC Edmonton during the season:
3	DF	(Canada) CAN	Edson Edward	10	0	9	0	0	0	0	0	1	0
15	DF	(Canada) CAN	Mallan Roberts	2	0	1+1	0	0	0	0	0	0	0
19	MF	(Germany) GER	Jason Plumhoff	7	1	3+3	1	0	0	0	0	0+1	0

=== Goal scorers ===
Place	Position	Nation	Number	Name	NASL Spring Season	NASL Fall Season	NASL Playoffs	Canadian Championship	Total
1	FW	(Northern Ireland)	16	Daryl Fordyce	1	6	0	0	7
2	FW	(United States)	23	Jake Keegan	4	1	0	0	5
3	DF	(Senegal)	4	Papé Diakité	2	1	0	0	3
4	DF	(Northern Ireland)	5	Albert Watson	1	1	0	0	2
4	FW	(England)	18	Tomi Ameobi	0	2	0	0	2
4	MF	(Canada)	9	Ben Fisk	0	2	0	0	2
4	MF	(Canada)	6	Nikolas Ledgerwood	0	2	0	0	2
8	MF	(Germany)	19	Jason Plumhoff	1	0	0	0	1
8	MF	(Brazil)	20	Gustavo Salgueiro	0	1	0	0	1
8	MF	(El Salvador)	11	Dustin Corea	0	0	0	1	1
8	DF	(England)	44	Adam Eckersley	0	0	0	1	1
TOTALS					9	15	0	2	26

=== Disciplinary record ===
Number	Nation	Position	Name	NASL Spring Season		NASL Fall Season		NASL Playoffs		Canadian Championship		Total	
Number	Nation	Position	Name	Yellow card	Red card	Yellow card	Red card	Yellow card	Red card	Yellow card	Red card	Yellow card	Red card
1	(United States)	GK	Matt Van Oekel	2	0	0	0	0	0	0	0	2	0
3	(Canada)	DF	Edson Edward	2	0	0	0	0	0	0	0	2	0
4	(Senegal)	DF	Papé Diakité	2	0	6	1	1	0	1	0	10	1
5	(Northern Ireland)	DF	Albert Watson	0	1	3	0	0	0	1	0	4	1
6	(Canada)	MF	Nikolas Ledgerwood	5	0	5	0	0	0	1	0	11	0
7	(Honduras)	MF	Cristian Raudales	1	0	0	0	0	0	0	0	1	0
10	(United States)	MF	Pablo Cruz	1	0	0	0	0	0	0	0	1	0
11	(El Salvador)	MF	Dustin Corea	1	0	0	0	0	0	0	0	1	0
12	(Portugal)	MF	Pedro Galvao	0	0	2	0	0	0	0	0	2	0
13	(United States)	DF	Karsten Smith	0	0	1	0	0	0	0	0	1	0
14	(The Gambia)	MF	Sainey Nyassi	1	0	1	1	0	0	0	0	1	1
15	(Canada)	DF	Mallan Roberts	1	0	0	0	0	0	0	0	1	0
16	(Northern Ireland)	FW	Daryl Fordyce	0	0	3	0	0	0	1	0	4	0
18	(England)	FW	Tomi Ameobi	3	0	0	0	0	0	0	0	3	0
20	(Brazil)	MF	Gustavo Salgueiro	0	0	1	0	0	0	0	0	1	0
22	(Guam)	DF	Shawn Nicklaw	0	0	5	0	0	0	0	0	5	0
23	(United States)	FW	Jake Keegan	1	0	0	0	0	0	0	0	1	0
26	(Canada)	MF	Shamit Shome	0	0	1	0	0	0	0	0	1	0
27	(Argentina)	MF	Nicolás Di Biase	0	0	2	0	0	0	0	0	2	0
44	(England)	DF	Adam Eckersley	3	0	5	0	1	0	0	0	9	0
			TOTALS	23	1	35	2	2	0	4	0	64	3
