= List of football clubs in Cambodia =

Football clubs in Cambodia are generally amateur and semi-amateur. However, in the Cambodian Premier League the clubs are professional.

== Cambodian Premier League ==
- Phnom Penh Crown
- Boeung Ket Angkor
- National Defense Ministry
- Preah Khan Reach Svay Rieng
- Angkor Tiger
- National Police Commissary
- Nagaworld
- Western Phnom Penh
- Visakha
- Asia Euro United
- Electricite du Cambodge
- Siem Reap
- Soltilo Angkor
- Build Bright United
- Memer Vital City

== Cambodian lower levels ==
- Anachek Baitong
- Intry Bopear
- Prek Pra Keila
- Kampong Cham
- Kampong Chhnang
- Kandal Province
- Riel Phnom Penh
- Koh Kong
- Khla Rokhen Kampong Chhnang
- Kang Reach Sey
- Kampong Thom
- National Assembly
- Oddar Meanchey
- RKC National
- University of Cambodia
- Nokorbal Cheat
- Ministry of Commerce
- Royal Dolphins
- Body Guard Club
- Civil Aviation
- Ministry Of Transport
- ISI Dangkor Senchey
- Tboung Khmum
- CMYA
