= Tony Kane =

Northern Irish footballer (born 1987)

Personal information
- Full name: Anthony Michael Kane
- Date of birth: 29 August 1987 (age 39)
- Place of birth: Belfast, Northern Ireland
- Positions: Full back; midfielder

Youth career
- Lisburn Youth

Senior career*
Years	Team	Apps	(Gls)
2004–2009	Blackburn Rovers	0	(0)
2006	→ Stockport County (loan)	4	(0)
2007	→ Cercle Brugge (loan)	11	(0)
2008	→ Stockport County (loan)	3	(0)
2009	→ Carlisle United (loan)	9	(0)
2009–2011	Carlisle United	5	(0)
2009	→ Darlington (loan)	4	(0)
2011	Cliftonville	8	(1)
2011–2021	Ballymena United	259	(32)
2021–2023	Dundela	65	(4)
Total		367	(37)

International career^{‡}
2006–2007	Republic of Ireland U21	5	(0)
2007–2008	Northern Ireland U21	5	(0)
- * Club domestic league appearances and goals as of 7 October 2023 ‡ National team caps and goals as of 7 October 2023

Anthony Michael Kane (born 29 August 1987) is a Northern Irish former footballer Kane was best known for his time at Ballymena United where he made over 250 appearances for the Sky Blues. As an international, Kane has represented both the Republic of Ireland and Northern Ireland at under-21 level.

== Club career ==
As a child, Kane played for Lisburn Youth, winning the Foyle Cup. Kane joined Blackburn Rovers as a youth in November 2004 and was subsequently a member of the squad that won the Premier Academy League in 2004–05. He then became a regular member of the Rovers reserve team before signing a two-year contract in 2006. In November 2006 he had a brief loan spell at Stockport County before joining Cercle Brugge on another loan deal in January 2007. In his first appearance for Cercle, Kane was voted man of the match by fans after a strong debut in a 2–0 win a debut against Zulte Waregem. On 31 January 2008, he signed a one-year contract with the club, keeping him until 2009. On 10 February 2009, Kane signed a loan deal which took him to Carlisle United until the end of the season. On 22 May 2009, it was announced by Carlisle United manager Greg Abbott that a deal had been verbally agreed between Carlisle United and Premier League side Blackburn Rovers to make the loan move a permanent one. Kane will be signing a two-year deal with the Cumbria based team. On 17 September 2009 Carlisle United agreed to send Kane to Darlington on a monthlong loan deal. In February 2011, having been released by Carlisle United, he signed for Belfast club Cliftonville, for whom he scored 11 minutes into his debut – a 2–0 away win over Newry City.

Following an impressive pre-season, he joined Ballymena United in July 2011 and made his debut against Lisburn Distillery in August 2011 but was sent-off late in the game. He scored his first goal for the Sky Blues against his former club, Cliftonville, in September at Solitude.

After making over 250 league appearances in 10 years, Kane was released by Ballymena United in the summer of 2021. On 8 July 2021, it was announced that Kane had signed for NIFL Championship side Dundela. Following a health scare during a game for Dundela, on 5 October 2023 it would be announced that Kane would be stepping back from football.

== International career ==
Together with Michael O'Connor, Marc Wilson and Darron Gibson, Kane is one of several footballers born in Northern Ireland, who were involved in a dispute between the Irish Football Association (IFA), which organizes football in Northern Ireland, and the Football Association of Ireland (FAI), which organizes football in the Republic of Ireland, over international eligibility. A test case was taken by the IFA to the Court of Arbitration for Sport, which found that FIFA was correctly applying its player eligibility regulations in allowing such players to represent the FAI.

=== Northern Ireland ===
Kane initially represented Northern Ireland at both under-18 and under-19 levels, before playing for the Republic of Ireland U21s during the 2006–07 season. He subsequently switched allegiances back to Northern Ireland and in November 2007 was called up for the senior team. He has also played for Northern Ireland U21s, becoming a regular member of the squad during the qualifying rounds for the 2009 European Under-21 Championship. To date he has played twice against Israel and in games against Luxembourg and Moldova. On 26 March 2008 he also played in a 3-1 friendly defeat against Romania.

=== Republic of Ireland ===
During the 2006–07 season Kane also made five friendly appearances for the Republic of Ireland U21s, making his debut on 18 October 2006 in a 2–0 win against Luxembourg. Then in February 2007 he was selected for the Republic U-21 squad to play in the Madeira Cup, subsequently playing in two of the three games: a 1–0 win against Slovakia and a 2–2 draw with Madeira. On 27 March, he played in a 1–0 defeat against the Netherlands before making his final appearance for the Republic U-21s on 21 August 2007 in 2–2 draw with Germany.

== Honours ==
Carlisle United

- Football League Trophy runner-up: 2009–10
