= Chris Johns (footballer) =

Northern Irish footballer (born 1995)

Personal information
- Full name: Christopher Patrick Adam Johns
- Date of birth: 13 May 1995 (age 31)
- Place of birth: Northern Ireland
- Position: Goalkeeper

Team information
- Current team: Linfield
- Number: 1

Youth career
- Lisburn Youth
- Dungannon United Youth
- Southampton

Senior career*
Years	Team	Apps	(Gls)
–2020	Coleraine	158	(0)
2020–	Linfield	158	(0)
- * Club domestic league appearances and goals as of 29 April 2026

Christopher Patrick Adam Johns (born 13 May 1995) is a Northern Irish footballer who plays as a goalkeeper for Linfield.

== Early life ==
Johns played rugby up until age 9. Johns suffered knee problems at a young age. This resulted in his moving to football as a goalkeeper and was scouted by Lisburn Youth. He then signed for Dungannon United Youth aged 14.

== College career ==
Johns attended Armagh Tech.

== Club career ==
On returning home from Southampton Academy in the summer of 2015, Johns signed for Northern Irish side Bangor. Johns moved to Coleraine in the January 2016 transfer window and over the next few seasons he became regarded as one of the club's most important players. In 2020, he signed for Northern Irish side Linfield.where he was regarded as one of the club's most important players.

== Personal life ==
Johns is the son of Irish rugby player Paddy Johns.

== Career statistics ==
As of match played 18 April 2025

Appearances and goals by club, season and competition
Club	Season	League			Irish Cup		NIFL Cup		Continental		Other		Total	
Club	Season	Division	Apps	Goals	Apps	Goals	Apps	Goals	Apps	Goals	Apps	Goals	Apps	Goals
Coleraine	2015-16	NIFL Premiership	14	0	0	0	0	0	—		—		14	0
Coleraine	2016-17	NIFL Premiership	36	0	4	0	3	0	—		—		43	0
Coleraine	2017-18	NIFL Premiership	38	0	4	0	1	0	1 (Note: Appearance(s) in UEFA Europa League)	0	1 (Note: Appearance(s) in NIFL Charity Shield)	0	45	0
Coleraine	2018-19	NIFL Premiership	39	0	3	0	1	0	2	0	2 (Note: Appearance(s) in Scottish Challenge Cup)	0	47	0
Coleraine	2019-20	NIFL Premiership	31	0	3	0	4	0	—		—		38	0
Coleraine	Total		158	0	14	0	9	0	3	0	3	0	187	0
Linfield	2020-21	NIFL Premiership	35	0	5	0	—		3 (Note: Two appearances in UEFA Champions League, One appearance in UEFA Europa League)	0	—		43	0
Linfield	2021-22	NIFL Premiership	36	0	2	0	1	0	6 (Note: Two appearances in UEFA Champions League, Four appearances in UEFA Europa Conference League)	0	—		45	0
Linfield	2022-23	NIFL Premiership	38	0	2	0	2	0	8 (Note: Four appearances in UEFA Champions League, Two appearances in UEFA Europa League, Two appearances in UEFA Europa Conference League)	0	1	0	51	0
Linfield	2023-24	NIFL Premiership	37	0	4	0	4	0	4 (Note: Appearance(s) in UEFA Europa Conference League)	0	—		49	0
Linfield	2024-25	NIFL Premiership	14	0	0	0	1	0	2	0	—		17	0
Linfield	Total		160	0	13	0	8	0	23	0	1	0	205	0
Career total			318	0	27	0	17	0	26	0	4	0	392	0
