= Paul Ferris (footballer) =

Northern Irish footballer (born 1965)

Personal information
- Date of birth: 10 July 1965 (age 61)
- Place of birth: Lisburn, Northern Ireland
- Height: 5 ft 8 in (1.73 m)
- Position: Midfielder

Youth career
- Lisburn Youth

Senior career*
Years	Team	Apps	(Gls)
1981–1985	Newcastle United	14	(1)
- Gateshead
- * Club domestic league appearances and goals

Paul Ferris (born 10 July 1965) is a Northern Irish former footballer, physiotherapist for Newcastle United, barrister, author, speaker and CEO.

== Biography ==
Ferris was born in Lisburn, Northern Ireland. In 1981, he signed for Newcastle United from Lisburn Youth in Northern Ireland and became the club's youngest ever debutant when he appeared aged just 16 years and 294 days. He scored his only senior goal against Bradford City in 1984. A medial ligament injury meant he played just 14 matches and moved to Barrow F.C., with whom he won the FA Trophy at Wembley before moving into local non-league football with Gateshead.

In 1993, he returned to Newcastle United as physiotherapist under Kevin Keegan. He remained there until 2006, during which time he gained a master's degree in History of Ideas. He also studied law before leaving to pursue a career as a barrister and was called to the bar at the Middle Temple in 2007. He returned to the club in April 2009 as part of Alan Shearer's management team.

He wrote his first novel An Irish Heartbeat in 2011. He formed a health and fitness equipment company Speedflex with Graham Wylie and Alan Shearer, with Ferris as Chief Executive.

Paul suffered a heart attack in 2013 and was later diagnosed with prostate cancer in 2016, fully recovering following treatment. He later wrote wrote his memoir The Boy On The Shed, which went on to be a highly acclaimed, multi-award-winning bestselling book (British Sports Book Awards - Autobiography of the Year / Sunday Times Sports Book of the Year / Times Sports Book of the Year / Daily Telegraph Football Book of the Year / Shortlisted for William Hill Sports Book of the Year).

He also wrote The Magic in the Tin, (Bloomsbury, 2022), an account of his battle with prostate cancer, and Once Upon a Toon: 18 Years Inside Newcastle United (Bloomsbury, 2025), an insider's perspective on life at Newcastle United.

He lives in Northumberland, England, with his wife Geraldine and has three boys and a granddaughter. He continues to write, drawing on experiences from elite sport, healthcare, law, business and his own life story.
