= Lisburn Youth F.C. =

Football club in Northern Ireland

Lisburn Youth
- Full name: Lisburn Youth Football Club
- Nickname: Orange Army
- Founded: 1968
- Ground: Drumbo Playing Fields
- Chairman: Colin Caswell
- League: Mid-Ulster Football League
- Website: lisburnyouthfc.co.uk

Lisburn Youth Football Club, frequently referred to as Lisburn Youth F.C. or simply Lisburn Youth, is a football club playing in the Mid-Ulster Football League in Northern Ireland. Lisburn Youth was founded in 1968 by Eddie Coulter, but would join the league format in 1972 as an established football team, which is cited on the club's crest. and are based in the village of Drumbo, Lisburn. They are nicknamed the Orange Army.

Lisburn Youth compete in Irish Cup and the IFA Junior Cup, as well as regional cup competitions, including the Alexandra Cup and the Beckett Cup. The latter of which they won in 2026. The younger teams have won a range of tournaments, including the Foyle Cup and the George Best Castlereagh Cup.

Lisburn Youth are known for producing professional and intranational football players. In the Northern Ireland Euro 2016 squad five of them formerly played for Lisburn Youth. David Healy brings it to six as part of the coaching team. It is one of the biggest youth football clubs in the country. Lisburn Youth founder Eddie Coulter went on to become a scout for Manchester United.

== Club identity and ground ==
Lisburn Youth play their home games at Drumbo Playing Fields. They play in orange and black.

The academy has teams for boys and girls starting from their "Toddler Soccer & Academy" and ages onwards.

In 2024, coach Colin Caswell won the People’s Award for Outstanding Contribution to Grassroots Football at the IFA Grassroots Awards.

== Notable former Lisburn Youth players ==
- Wayne Carlisle
- Stephen Craigan
- Colum Curtis
- Jonny Evans
- Paul Ferris
- Daryl Fordyce
- Keith Gillespie
- David Healy
- Aaron Hughes
- Liam Hughes
- Chris Johns
- Tony Kane
- Ben Kennedy
- Peter Kennedy
- Neil Masters
- Gareth McAuley
- Grant McCann
- Jamie McDonnell
- Conor McLaughlin
- Ryan McLaughlin
- Stephen Robinson
- Andy Smyth
- Andrew Waterworth
- Marc Wilson

== Honours ==
Mid-Ulster Football League

- Beckett Cup
  - 2025/26

Irish Football Association

- Irish FA Grassroots Awards
  - People’s Award for Outstanding Contribution to Grassroots Football
    - 2024 - Colin Caswell
