= Liam Hughes (footballer, born 2001) =

Northern Irish footballer

Personal information
- Full name: Liam John Hughes
- Date of birth: 19 August 2001 (age 25)
- Place of birth: Craigavon, Northern Ireland
- Height: 1.93 m (6 ft 4 in)
- Position: Goalkeeper

Team information
- Current team: Sligo Rovers
- Number: 1

Youth career
- Lisburn Youth
- 2016–2017: Portadown
- 2017–2018: Dungannon Swifts
- 2017–2021: Celtic
- 2021–2023: Liverpool

Senior career*
Years	Team	Apps	(Gls)
2017	Portadown	1	(0)
2021–2023	Liverpool	0	(0)
2024–2025	Haka	20	(0)
2026–	Sligo Rovers	6	(0)

International career^{‡}
2017	Northern Ireland U17	2	(0)
2019	Northern Ireland U19	1	(0)
2019–2021	Northern Ireland U21	5	(0)
- * Club domestic league appearances and goals as of 10 November 2026 ‡ National team caps and goals as of 16 November 2021

Liam John Hughes (born 19 August 2001) is a Northern Irish footballer who plays as a goalkeeper for League of Ireland Premier Division club Sligo Rovers.

== Career ==
In Hughes early career, he played for Lisburn Youth in Drumbo, County Down. Hughes made his senior debut for Portadown on the last day of the 2016-17 season, aged 15 years old, appearing as a substitute against Dungannon Swifts.

In the summer of 2017, Hughes signed for Swifts on a three-year contract, before moving to Celtic in February 2018. He played in the 2019 Scottish Youth Cup Final, where he ended up on the losing side as Celtic were beaten 3–2 by Rangers.

In February 2021, he signed for Liverpool, and was named in the first team squad for the first time later that month, featuring as an unused substitute in their Premier League victory over Sheffield United. In June 2023, Liverpool decided not to extend Hughes' contract, and he became a free agent.

On 12 January 2024, Finnish club Haka announced the signing of Hughes on a two-year deal.

On 29 December 2025, League of Ireland Premier Division club Sligo Rovers announced the signing of Hughes for the upcoming 2026 season. Having been second choice keeper for the entire season behind Sam Sargeant, Hughes finally made his debut on 14 September 2026, in a 3–1 defeat at home to Galway United. On 15 October 2026, it was announced that Hughes had signed a new contract with the club for 2027, following their relegation to the League of Ireland First Division.

== International career ==
Hughes has featured for both the Northern Ireland Under 17s and Northern Ireland Under 21s, making his debut for the latter in October 2019.

== Career statistics ==
As of match played 30 October 2026

Appearances and goals by club, season and competition
Club	Season	League			National cup (Note: Includes Irish Cup, FA Cup, Finnish Cup & FAI Cup)		League Cup (Note: Includes NIFL Cup, EFL Cup & Finnish League Cup)		Europe		Other		Total	
Club	Season	Division	Apps	Goals	Apps	Goals	Apps	Goals	Apps	Goals	Apps	Goals	Apps	Goals
Portadown	2016-17	NIFL Premiership	1	0	0	0	0	0	—		—		1	0
Dungannon Swifts	2017-18	NIFL Premiership	0	0	0	0	0	0	—		—		0	0
Celtic B	2019-20	—			—		—		—		0	0	0	0
Liverpool	2020-21	Premier League	0	0	0	0	0	0	0	0	0	0	0	0
Liverpool	2021-22	Premier League	0	0	0	0	0	0	0	0	—		0	0
Liverpool	Total		0	0	0	0	0	0	0	0	0	0	0	0
Haka	2024	Veikkausliiga	0	0	0	0	2	0	—		—		2	0
Haka	2025	Veikkausliiga	20	0	5	0	3	0	—		—		28	0
Haka	Total		20	0	5	0	5	0	—		—		30	0
Sligo Rovers	2026	LOI Premier Division	6	0	0	0	—		—		—		6	0
Career total			27	0	5	0	5	0	0	0	0	0	37	0
