= Colum Curtis =

Northern Irish football manager

Personal information
- Full name: Colum Curtis
- Date of birth: 21 October 1989 (age 37)
- Place of birth: Belfast, Northern Ireland

Youth career
- Lisburn Youth
- Manchester United
- Notts County

Senior career*
Years	Team	Apps	(Gls)
- Cliftonville
- Donegal Celtic
- Glentoran
- Knockbreda
- Ards
- Loughgall

Managerial career
- 2019: PKR Svay Rieng (assistant)
- 2020-2021: Visakha FC
- 2023-2024: Kaya–Iloilo
- 2025 - Present: Bangkok F.C. (sporting director)
- * Club domestic league appearances and goals

Colum Curtis is an Irish football manager and holds the UEFA Pro Licence. As a footballer, he was a product of Manchester United's Youth, before playing in his native Northern Ireland. Curtis's philosophy emphasizes high energy, relentless effort, and a strong connection between players, making his teams exciting to watch and difficult to compete against.

== Early life, playing career and education ==
Curtis was born in Belfast, Northern Ireland, on October 21, 1989. He attended St. Mary's Christian Brothers Grammar School.

In his youth, Curtis played as a central midfielder or winger for Lisburn Youth and attended Manchester United's Academy from the ages of 9 to 15. Following his release from Manchester United, Colum made the move to Notts County in 2008, where he stayed for one season before returning to Belfast after the club was facing financial difficulty. Colum began coaching at his local grassroots club Immaculata F.C. He combined his coaching with his playing career, Colum represented his country at the U18 level and represented Northern Ireland in the 2013 and 2015 UEFA Regions Cup. He had spells with Cliftonville, Donegal Celtic FC, Glentoran FC, Knockbreda FC, Ards FC, and Loughgall FC before retiring from senior football at the age of 25 to take up a Full-Time coaching role in China.

Curtis played a few games for Bangor FC during the 2018/19 season.

Curtis began his UEFA Pro License in June 2021 and completed in November 2022.

== Managerial career ==
=== PKR Svay Rieng ===
Curtis was then appointed as the Assistant Coach to Connor Nestor at Preah Khan Reach Svay Rieng FC in 2019, where he helped guide the club to the 2019 Metfone C-League championship.

At the end of the season, Curtis was unable to agree terms and parted ways with the club.

=== Visakha FC ===
Not long after, Visakha FC signed Curtis as Head Coach on a two-year deal for the 2020 campaign, where he won the Hun Sen Cup, in a convincing 2–0 victory over Nagaworld Fc in the final. This was the club's first major trophy. During his tenure, Colum brought in marquee signings in the form of Canadian International, Marcus Haber, veteran Cambodian player Thierry Bin, and seasoned English journeyman Charlie Machell.

In 2021, Curtis's Visakha team began to make headlines for their possession-based attacking style of play. He parted ways with the club, despite Visakha being at the top of the league.

=== Kaya–Iloilo ===
In August 2023, Curtis was appointed as head coach of Philippines Football League club Kaya–Iloilo. He led Kaya in the AFC Champions league as well as winning thefinal of the 2023 Copa Paulino Alcantara on his final game in charge.

== Honours ==
PKR Svay Rieng

- Metfone C-League: 2019

Visakha FC

- Hun Sen Cup : 2020

Kaya-Iloilo

- Copa Paulino Alcantara : 2023

Individual

- Best Coach: 2020
