= Marc Wilson (footballer) =

Irish footballer (born 1987)

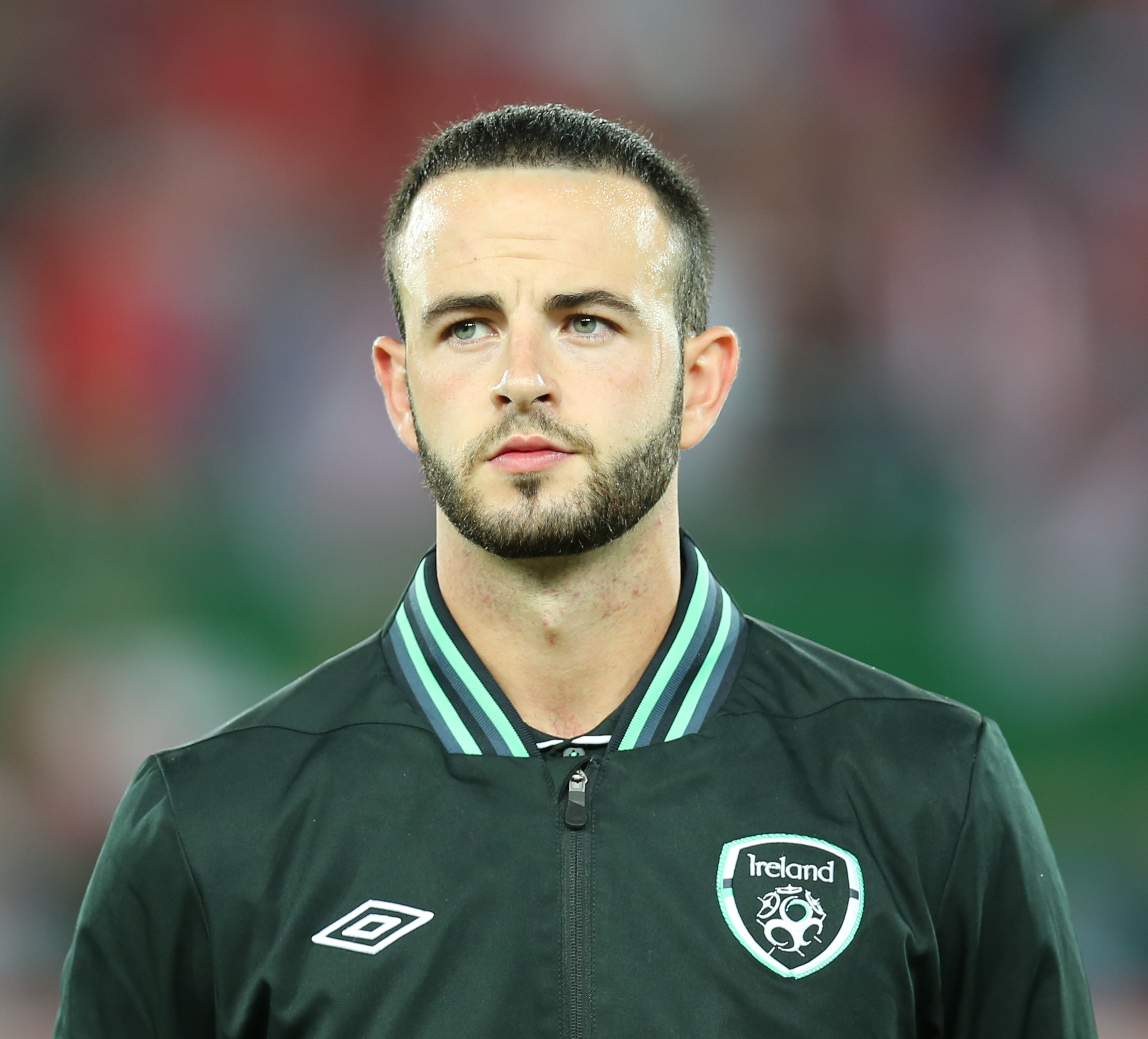
- Wilson with the Republic of Ireland national team in September 2013

Personal information
- Full name: Marc David Wilson
- Date of birth: 17 August 1987 (age 39)
- Place of birth: Aghagallon, County Antrim, Northern Ireland
- Height: 1.88 m (6 ft 2 in)
- Positions: Defender; midfielder

Youth career
- 2000: Lisburn Youth
- 2001–2004: Manchester United
- 2004–2006: Portsmouth

Senior career*
Years	Team	Apps	(Gls)
2006–2010	Portsmouth	35	(0)
2006	→ Yeovil Town (loan)	2	(0)
2007	→ AFC Bournemouth (loan)	19	(3)
2007	→ AFC Bournemouth (loan)	7	(0)
2007	→ Luton Town (loan)	4	(0)
2010–2016	Stoke City	146	(1)
2016–2017	AFC Bournemouth	0	(0)
2017	→ West Bromwich Albion (loan)	4	(0)
2017–2018	Sunderland	21	(0)
2018–2019	Bolton Wanderers	16	(0)
2021–2022	Þróttur Vogum	10	(0)
2022	ÍBV	0	(0)
Total		264	(4)

International career
2002	Northern Ireland U15		
2004–2005	Republic of Ireland U18		
2005–2006	Republic of Ireland U19		
2006–2007	Republic of Ireland U21	1	(0)
2011–2016	Republic of Ireland	25	(1)
- * Club domestic league appearances and goals

Marc David Wilson (born 17 August 1987) is an Irish former professional footballer.

Wilson left his home town of Aghagallon in 2000 to join the Manchester United Academy, after four years he was released and was signed by Hampshire club Portsmouth. He went out on loan to AFC Bournemouth, Luton Town and Yeovil Town to gain first team experience before making his Premier League debut on boxing day in 2008. After Portsmouth were relegated to the Football League in 2010 Wilson was named as club captain.

In August 2010 he joined Stoke City in a deal which saw Stoke duo Liam Lawrence and Dave Kitson join Pompey. He converted to left back under Tony Pulis and in his first season at Stoke he played in the 2011 FA Cup final as Stoke lost 1–0 to Manchester City. Wilson was a regular in 2011–12 as Stoke played in the UEFA Europa League. He suffered a broken leg in October 2012 which saw him miss most of the 2012–13 season. He became used as a back-up player under Mark Hughes and left Stoke in August 2016 to join Bournemouth.

Wilson got his first call up to the Republic of Ireland senior squad for their game against Brazil in March 2010, and made his first appearance as a substitute in February 2011 during the 3–0 Nations Cup win over Wales.

== Club career ==
=== Early career ===
Wilson was born in Aghagallon near Lisburn and started out playing association football with Lisburn Youth and Gaelic football with St Paul's Lurgan High School and St Mary's Aghagallon GAA. Whilst playing GAA Wilson scored a goal in the 2001 McDevitt Cup Final. Wilson decided to concentrate on his football with Lisburn Youth and earned a place in Manchester United's centre of excellence. He spent four years in Manchester before joining Portsmouth in 2004 at the age of 16.

=== Portsmouth ===
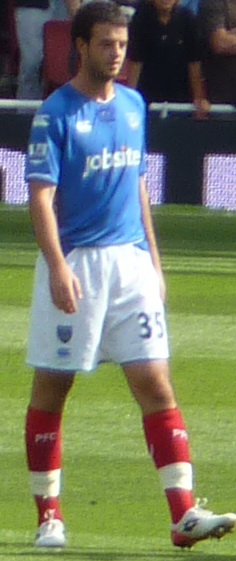
Wilson playing for Portsmouth

In his early years at Portsmouth, he played regularly for the reserve team and was loaned out to other clubs on four occasions. In March 2006 he made his League One debut with Yeovil Town in a 2–0 win away to Walsall. In 2007, he spent two separate spells at AFC Bournemouth, making 26 league appearances and scoring three goals. In November 2007 he also had a brief loan spell at Luton Town which was cut short when the club went into administration.

On 7 July 2008, Marc Wilson signed a new three-year contract at Portsmouth. He made his Pompey debut coming on as a substitute for Richard Hughes in a 4–0 League Cup 3rd round loss to Chelsea on 24 September 2008. Wilson excelled playing at right-back on his first start for Portsmouth in a 3–0 UEFA Cup victory over Heerenveen. On Boxing Day 2008, Wilson started his first Premier League match in the 4–1 loss at home to West Ham. On 5 August 2009, it was revealed that Wilson had been involved in an alleged bust-up with fellow team-mate David Nugent during Portsmouth's pre-season trip to Portugal. Both players were sent home and consequently fined two weeks wages by the club.

In 2009–10 Wilson became a first choice player in the Pompey side that was relegated and reached the FA Cup final although Wilson himself did not play in the final due to injury. Though his performances as a central defender earned him criticism, he impressed after returning to his natural position of centre midfield towards the end of the season. On 5 February 2010 Wilson signed a new three-and-a-half-year contract to stay at Portsmouth to the end of the 2012–13 season. After Portsmouth's relegation to the Championship Wilson was handed the number 6 shirt after previously wearing 35 and was named as captain. At 22 years old he became one of the youngest permanent captains in the club's history. However manager Steve Cotterill revealed that Wilson was close to a transfer to Premier League side Stoke City.

=== Stoke City ===
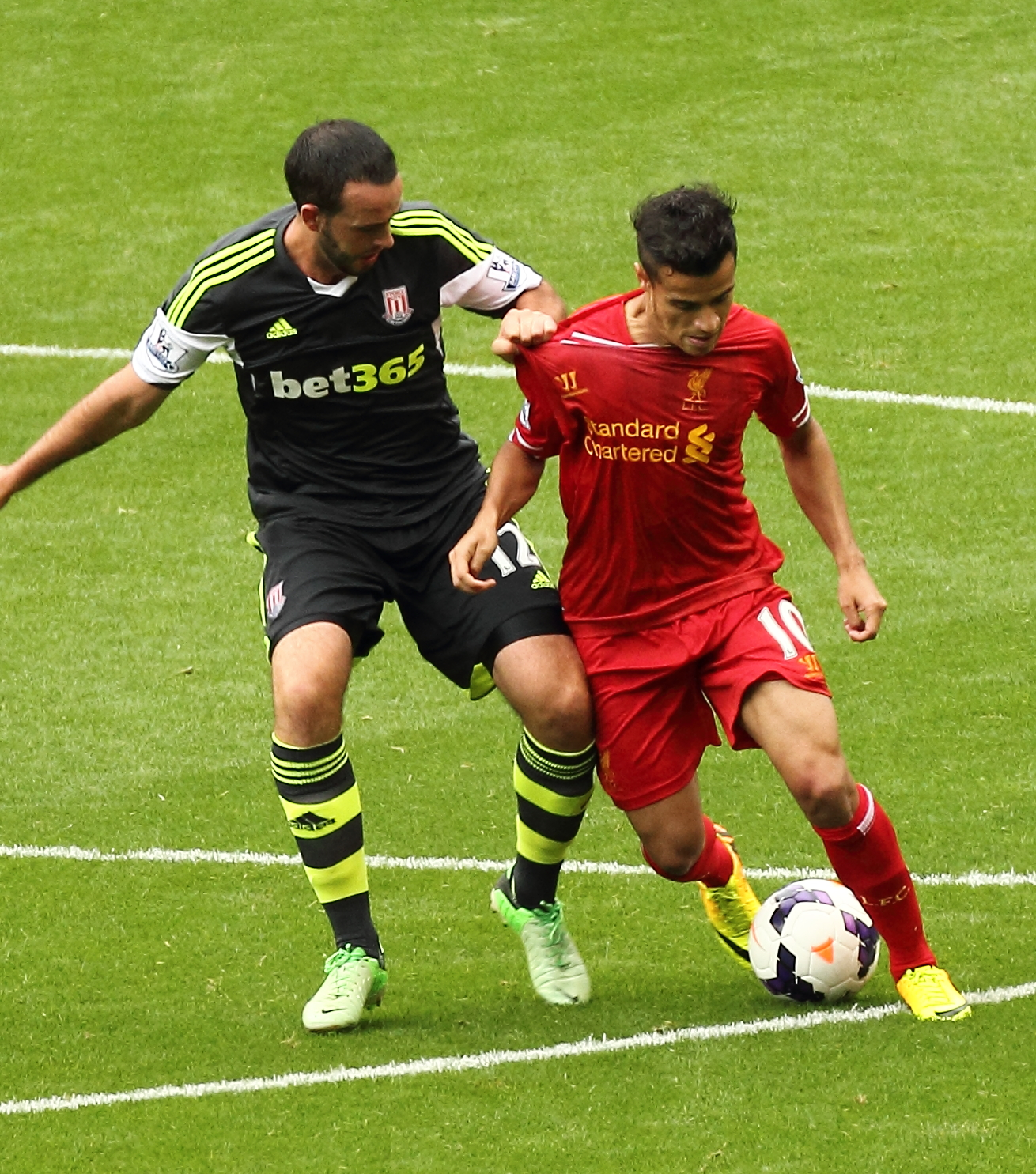
Wilson (left) challenging Liverpool's Philippe Coutinho in August 2013

Wilson signed for Stoke City on 31 August 2010 player-plus-cash exchange deal which saw Liam Lawrence and Dave Kitson move in the opposite direction to Football League Championship club Portsmouth. Wilson made his City debut on 13 September 2010 against Aston Villa, despite playing well and making some good passes Wilson seemed to be struggling with the physicality of Villa's midfielders Stiliyan Petrov and Nigel Reo-Coker and was substituted just after half time. He completed his first full 90 minutes against Manchester United on 24 October 2010. His performance earned praise from manager Tony Pulis. "He was smashing. He passed the ball well and looked a quality player, he's one for the future, without a question of doubt". Wilson scored his first goal for City in a 2–0 win away at Blackburn Rovers on 26 December 2010. He then produced man of the match displays against Manchester United and Cardiff City at the beginning of 2011.

Since joining Stoke, Wilson has shown his versatility and has occupied three positions – centre midfield, right back and due to injury to Danny Higginbotham and Danny Collins in poor form has also played mostly at left back. Wilson played in every FA Cup match, at left back, as Stoke reached the 2011 FA Cup Final. Prior to the final, Wilson was not on the losing side in 14 FA Cup matches. However his run was ended as Stoke lost the final 1–0 to Manchester City. Wilson continued to play at left back during the 2011–12 season and was branded by Tony Pulis as 'Stoke's unsung hero'. Wilson played in 45 matches for Stoke in 2011–12 including six in the UEFA Europa League as Stoke finished in 14th position.

Wilson began the 2012–13 season in fine form but on 27 October 2012 he suffered a broken fibula playing against Sunderland. Just before his injury Wilson had signed a new three-year contract. He returned to training in January 2013. He made his return from injury against Fulham on 23 February 2013. He ended the season with 20 appearances to his name as Stoke finished in 13th position and at the end of the campaign manager Tony Pulis was replaced with Mark Hughes, which was met with approval from Wilson.

Following the signings of Erik Pieters and Marc Muniesa, assistant manager Mark Bowen stated that Wilson could revert to a midfield position in 2013–14. As expected Wilson began the season in a centre midfield spot and he stated that he is enjoying the change in style under Hughes. He failed to hold down a regular place in midfield and after spending a few months on the bench he returned to the starting line-up in December 2013, playing at centre-back after injury to Robert Huth. Wilson continued to play alongside Ryan Shawcross in centre of defence until the end of the 2013–14 season as Stoke finished in 9th position. Wilson played 30 times for Stoke in 2014–15 as Stoke again finished in 9th position. Wilson was the only Stoke player to be sent-off in the Premier League during the season after he received two yellow cards against Swansea City on 2 May 2015.

On 30 January 2016 Wilson suffered a knee injury in a FA Cup match against Crystal Palace ruling him out for up-to six months. Wilson made ten appearances in 2015–16 making just one league start.

Prior to the start of the 2016–17 season, Wilson cast doubt over his future at Stoke after he criticised manager Mark Hughes on social media.

=== AFC Bournemouth ===
Wilson re-joined Bournemouth on 15 August 2016 signing a two-year contract for an undisclosed fee. He scored his first goal in his most recent spell at the club in a 2–1 EFL Cup win over Morecambe on 24 August 2016.

After being a peripheral figure at Dean Court, Wilson re-joined Tony Pulis at West Bromwich Albion on 31 January 2017 on loan for the remainder of the 2016–17 season. He made his debut for West Brom on 6 May 2017, starting in a 2–2 draw against Burnley.

=== Sunderland ===
Wilson joined Championship side Sunderland on 31 August 2017 on a free transfer.

At the end of the 2017–18 season, following Sunderland's relegation, he was released by the club.

=== Bolton Wanderers ===
On 24 July 2018, he joined Bolton Wanderers on a one-year contract, becoming Wanderers manager Phil Parkinson sixth new addition of the close season.

He made his debut for Bolton on 14 August 2018 in an EFL Cup defeat against Leeds United at Elland Road. In his first full league start for Wanderers against Ipswich Town on 22 September 2018 he was red-carded in the first half of the game for bringing down Ipswich striker Kayden Jackson.

=== Player/coaching career in Iceland ===
In April 2021, Wilson joined Icelandic side Þróttur Vogum as player-coach where his former Portsmouth teammate Hermann Hreiðarsson was manager. He played ten total matches in the 2. deild karla during the season. He then joined another Icelandic team in the same player/coach role — ÍBV — following Hreiðarsson, who had also joined ÍBV. He played no matches due to struggling with injury throughout the season.

== International career ==
Wilson was involved in an ongoing dispute between the Irish Football Association (who represent the Northern Ireland national team) and the Football Association of Ireland (who represent the Ireland national team) over international eligibility. He has been quoted as saying: "I think everybody has their own personal reasons for wanting to play for the Republic or the North. I grew up supporting the Republic so it was a comfortable decision for me."

=== Northern Ireland ===
Wilson played for Northern Ireland at under-15 level before switching allegiances to the Republic.

=== Republic of Ireland ===
Wilson later represented the Republic of Ireland at various youth levels including under-18, under-19 and under-21. Wilson received his first call up for the international side for a friendly against Brazil in March 2010, but did not feature in the game. He earned his first cap for the Republic as a second-half substitute in the 2011 Nations Cup against Wales in February 2011. In January 2012 new Northern Ireland manager Michael O'Neill offered Wilson a chance to switch allegiances again but Wilson rejected his offer. On 16 October 2012, he scored his first international goal in a 2014 FIFA World Cup qualifying match in a 4–1 away win against the Faroe Islands with an impressive 25-yard shot with his right foot. He continued at left back throughout the 2014 World Cup qualifying campaign but Ireland failed to qualify.

In Martin O'Neill's first game as Irish manager against Latvia, O'Neill converted Wilson to centre back partnering John O'Shea. Ireland won the match 3–0. Wilson continued at centre back against Serbia. Wilson started in O'Neill's first competitive game as Irish manager against Georgia. Ireland won 2–1 thanks to a superb last minute winner by Aiden McGeady. Wilson started in the memorable 1–1 draw against Germany in Gelsenkirchen.

On 23 May 2016, Martin O'Neill announced that Wilson, who was named in the Republic of Ireland's initial 35-man squad for UEFA Euro 2016, had been ruled out of the campaign through injury. O'Neill told a press conference at the FAI National Training Centre: "Marc Wilson has had a setback. The best thing for him is to take four or five weeks off. He will be out."

== Career statistics ==
=== Club ===
Appearances and goals by club, season and competition
Club	Season	League			FA Cup		League Cup		Europe		Other		Total	
Club	Season	Division	Apps	Goals	Apps	Goals	Apps	Goals	Apps	Goals	Apps	Goals	Apps	Goals
Portsmouth	2008–09	Premier League	3	0	2	0	1	0	1 (Note: Appearance in the UEFA Cup)	0	—		7	0
Portsmouth	2009–10	Premier League	28	0	6	0	2	0	—		—		36	0
Portsmouth	2010–11	Championship	4	0	0	0	2	0	—		—		6	0
Portsmouth	Total		35	0	8	0	5	0	1	0	0	0	49	0
Yeovil Town (loan)	2005–06	League One	2	0	0	0	0	0	—		—		2	0
AFC Bournemouth (loan)	2006–07	League One	19	3	0	0	0	0	—		—		19	3
AFC Bournemouth (loan)	2007–08	League One	7	0	0	0	0	0	—		1 (Note: Appearance in the Football League Trophy)	0	8	0
AFC Bournemouth (loan)	Total		26	3	0	0	0	0	0	0	1	0	27	3
Luton Town (loan)	2007–08	League One	4	0	0	0	0	0	—		—		4	0
Stoke City	2010–11	Premier League	28	1	7	0	0	0	—		—		35	1
Stoke City	2011–12	Premier League	35	0	2	0	2	0	6 (Note: Appearances in the Europa League)	0	—		45	0
Stoke City	2012–13	Premier League	19	0	0	0	1	0	—		—		20	0
Stoke City	2013–14	Premier League	33	0	2	0	3	0	—		—		38	0
Stoke City	2014–15	Premier League	27	0	2	0	1	0	—		—		30	0
Stoke City	2015–16	Premier League	4	0	2	0	4	0	—		—		10	0
Stoke City	Total		146	1	15	0	11	0	6	0	0	0	178	1
AFC Bournemouth	2016–17	Premier League	0	0	1	0	2	1	—		—		3	1
West Bromwich Albion (loan)	2016–17	Premier League	4	0	0	0	0	0	—		—		4	0
Sunderland	2017–18	Championship	21	0	1	0	0	0	—		—		22	0
Bolton Wanderers	2018–19	Championship	16	0	0	0	1	0	—		—		17	0
Þróttur Vogum	2022	2. deild karla	10	0	—		—		—		—		10	0
Career total			264	4	25	0	19	1	7	0	1	0	316	5

=== International ===
Appearances and goals by national team and year
National team	Year	Apps	Goals
Republic of Ireland
Republic of Ireland	2011	1	0
Republic of Ireland	2012	2	1
Republic of Ireland	2013	11	0
Republic of Ireland	2014	6	0
Republic of Ireland	2015	4	0
Republic of Ireland	2016	1	0
Total		25	1

=== International goals ===
Ireland score listed first, score column indicates score after each Wilson goal.

International goals by date, venue, cap, opponent, score, result and competition
No.	Date	Venue	Cap	Opponent	Score	Result	Competition	Ref
1	16 October 2012	Tórsvøllur, Tórshavn, Faroe Islands	3	Faroe Islands	1–0	4–1	2014 FIFA World Cup qualification	

== Honours ==
Stoke City

- FA Cup runner-up: 2010–11

Republic of Ireland

- Nations Cup: 2011

Individual

- Stoke City Coaching Staff's Player of the Year: 2011–12

== See also ==
- List of Republic of Ireland international footballers born outside the Republic of Ireland
