= Kep FC =

Cambodian football club

- Full name: Kep Football Club
- Nickname(s): Crabs
- Ground: Kep Stadium
- League: Hun Sen Cup
- Website: https://cncc-football.com/hun-sen-cup.html
Home colours	Away colours

Kep Football Club (Khmer: កែប), is a football club based in Kep Province, Cambodia. The club competes in the Hun Sen Cup, the major national cup competition of Cambodian football. The team represents the Province and competes annually in the Provincial Stage of the competition.
