= Papé Diakité =

Senegalese footballer (born 1992)

Personal information
- Full name: Papé Abdoulaye Diakité
- Date of birth: 22 December 1992 (age 33)
- Place of birth: Pikine, Senegal
- Height: 1.93 m (6 ft 4 in)
- Position: Centre-back

Team information
- Current team: Kedah FA
- Number: 44

Youth career
- AS Dakar Sacré-Cœur

Senior career*
Years	Team	Apps	(Gls)
2011	AS Dakar Sacré-Cœur		
2011–2012	AS Trenčín	8	(0)
2013–2015	Royal Antwerp	33	(0)
2014	→ Oosterzonen (loan)	11	(0)
2016–2017	Edmonton	56	(3)
2018	Police Tero		
2018–2019	Tampa Bay Rowdies	46	(0)
2020–2021	Ho Chi Minh City	20	(0)
2021	Sai Gon		
2022	Terengganu	19	(1)
2023	Hoang Anh Gia Lai	20	(0)
2024	Calicut	4	(0)
2025–	Kedah FA	28	(1)
- * Club domestic league appearances and goals

Papé Abdoulaye Diakité (born 22 December 1992) is a Senegalese professional footballer who plays as a centre-back for Kedah FA.

== Career ==
=== Trenčín ===
Diakité made his debut for AS Trenčín against Žilina on 24 November 2011.

=== FC Edmonton ===
On 8 February 2016, Diakité signed for Edmonton in the North American Soccer League. Diakité later revealed that he had offers from Romania and Bulgaria prior to signing with Edmonton, and originally was not going to sign with the club. After a strong 2016 season, Diakité was named the NASL's Young Player of the Year for the 2016 season

=== Terengganu ===
in 2022, Diakité moved to Malaysia to join Terengganu. With his calm demeanor and his dexterity in fending off opponents attacks, he was praised in the league.

== Career statistics ==
As of match played 29 October 2016

Appearances and goals by club, season and competition
Club	Season	League			National cup		Continental		Other		Total	
Club	Season	Division	Apps	Goals	Apps	Goals	Apps	Goals	Apps	Goals	Apps	Goals
Trenčín	2011–12	Fortuna Liga	8	0	0	0	–		–		8	0
Royal Antwerp	2013–14	Belgian Second Division	8	0	0	0	–		–		8	0
Royal Antwerp	2014–15	Belgian Second Division	25	0	1	0	–		–		26	0
Royal Antwerp	Total		41	0	1	0	0	0	0	0	42	0
Oosterzonen (loan)	2013–14	Belgian Third Division	11	0	0	0	–		–		11	0
Edmonton	2016	NASL	27	3	2	0	–		–		29	3
Career total			79	3	4	0	0	0	0	0	82	3
