= Kampong Speu FC =

Cambodian football club

- Full name: Kampong Speu Football Club
- Nickname(s): Starfruits
- Ground: Kampong Speu Department of Education, Youth and Sport stadium
- League: Hun Sen Cup Cambodian Second League
- Website: https://cncc-football.com/hun-sen-cup.html
Home colours

Kampong Speu Football Club (Khmer: ខេត្តកំពង់ស្ពឺ), is a football club based in Kampong Speu Province, Cambodia. The club competes in the Hun Sen Cup, the major national cup competition of Cambodian football. The team represents the Province and competes annually in the Provincial Stage of the competition.
