= Abraham Dukuly =

Ghanaian-Canadian soccer player

Personal information
- Date of birth: May 28, 2000 (age 26)
- Place of birth: Accra, Ghana
- Height: 1.80 m (5 ft 11 in)
- Position: Forward

Team information
- Current team: BTB SC

Youth career
- Edmonton Xtreme FC
- 2015–2019: FC Edmonton

College career
Years	Team	Apps	(Gls)
2018	NAIT Ooks	10	(2)

Senior career*
Years	Team	Apps	(Gls)
2017	FC Edmonton	4	(0)
2021	South Bend Lions FC	13	(3)
2024–	Edmonton BTB SC	0	(0)
- * Club domestic league appearances and goals as of March 28, 2024

Abraham Dukuly (born May 28, 2000) is a Ghanaian soccer player.

== Early life ==
Born in Ghana, Dukuly moved to Winnipeg, Canada at a young age, before moving again to Edmonton. Dukuly played youth soccer with Edmonton Xtreme FC, before later joining the FC Edmonton Academy. In the summer of 2017, he was named to the roster for Team Alberta at the 2017 Canada Summer Games, where he was named to the tournament All-Star Team.

== College career ==
In 2018, Dukuly began attending the Northern Alberta Institute of Technology, where he played for the men's soccer team. In his first season, he was named the ACAC Rookie of the Year.

== Club career ==
In August 2017, Dukuly signed a professional contract with North American Soccer League side FC Edmonton on August 28, 2017. He made his professional debut on October 1 against the San Francisco Deltas.

In March 2020, he went on trial with Canadian Premier League club Cavalry FC during their pre-season. In August 2021, he signed with USL League Two club South Bend Lions FC. In 2024, he joined Edmonton BTB SC in League1 Alberta.
