= Sabri Khattab =

Footballer (born 1990)

Personal information
- Full name: Sabri Freddy Khattab
- Date of birth: 12 January 1990 (age 36)
- Place of birth: Halden, Norway
- Height: 1.85 m (6 ft 1 in)
- Position: Midfielder

Team information
- Current team: Tistedalen
- Number: 19

Youth career
- –2008: Kvik Halden

Senior career*
| Years | Team | Apps | (Gls) |
| 2008–2012 | Kvik Halden | | |
| 2012–2016 | Bryne | 96 | (9) |
| 2016–2017 | Kvik Halden | 21 | (3) |
| 2017 | FC Edmonton | 11 | (0) |
| 2017–2019 | Elverum | 62 | (4) |
| 2020 | Tistedalen | | |
| 2020 | Kvik Halden | 2 | (0) |
| 2021– | Tistedalen | 13 | (2) |
- * Club domestic league appearances and goals as of 20:59, 20 February 2022 (UTC)

Sabri Freddy Khattab (Arabic: صبري خطاب; born 12 January 1990) is a footballer who plays as a midfielder for Tistedalens TIF. Born in Norway, he declared himself for the Egypt national team in 2013.

== Club career ==
Sabri signed for FC Edmonton from hometown side Kvik Halden in 2017. He made his debut in a 1–0 loss to Jacksonville Armada, coming on as a substitute for Dean Shiels.

In July 2017, Sabri returned to Norway and signed for Elverum Sabri left Elverum at the end of 2019 and moved back to Halden, where he was born. In May 2020, Khattab moved to Tistedalens TIF. He then had a short spell with Kvik Halden in late 2020, before returning to Tistedalens in 2021.

== International career ==
Although he was born in Norway, Sabri declared himself for the Egypt national team in 2013, however he has yet to be called up.
