= Nico Di Biase =

Argentine footballer

Personal information
- Full name: Nicolás Aníbal Di Biase
- Date of birth: 9 December 1988 (age 37)
- Place of birth: Buenos Aires, Argentina
- Height: 1.82 m (6 ft 0 in)
- Position: Midfielder

Youth career
- 2003–2008: Boca Juniors

Senior career*
Years	Team	Apps	(Gls)
2008–2009	Langreo	33	(3)
2009–2010	UD Los Llanos	34	(2)
2010–2011	Castel di Sangro	24	(0)
2011–2012	San Telmo	18	(0)
2012–2013	Puertollano	33	(1)
2013–2014	Zamora	33	(0)
2014–2015	Conquense	11	(0)
2015	Lucena	13	(0)
2015–2016	Blooming	29	(3)
2016–2017	FC Edmonton	26	(0)
2018–2019	Al-Yarmouk		
2019–2020	Khaitan		
2020–2021	Al-Yarmouk		
- * Club domestic league appearances and goals

Nicolás Aníbal "Nico" Di Biase (born 9 December 1988) is an Argentine former professional footballer who played as a midfielder.

== Career ==
Di Biase moved to FC Edmonton in 2016.

After one year at Al-Yarmouk SC in Kuwait, he joined another Kuwaiti club, Khaitan SC. He returned again to Al-Yarmouk and contributed to the club's arrival in the Premier League.
