= Gustavo (footballer, born 1984) =

Brazilian footballer

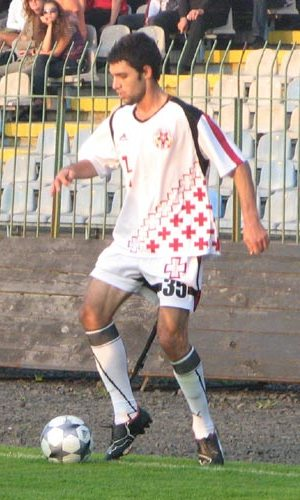

Personal information
- Full name: Gustavo Salgueiro de Almeida Correia
- Date of birth: 7 July 1984 (age 42)
- Place of birth: Maceió, Brazil
- Height: 1.81 m (5 ft 11 1/2 in)
- Position: Striker

Senior career*
Years	Team	Apps	(Gls)
2003–2004	Sport Recife		
2005–2006	América (SP)		
2007	AS Arapiraquense		
2007	Montedio Yamagata	2	(0)
2008	Widzew Łódź	1	(0)
2009	CS Alagoano		
2009	Murici		
2009	Volyn Lutsk	6	(0)
2010	Murici		
2011	Grêmio Barueri		
2011–2012	ASA	12	(2)
2014	Lajeadense	8	(1)
2015	Murici	9	(1)
2016	FC Edmonton	14	(1)
- * Club domestic league appearances and goals

Gustavo Salgueiro de Almeida Correia also known as Gustavo (born 7 July 1984) is a Brazilian former professional footballer who played as a striker.
