= Daryl Fordyce =

Northern Irish footballer

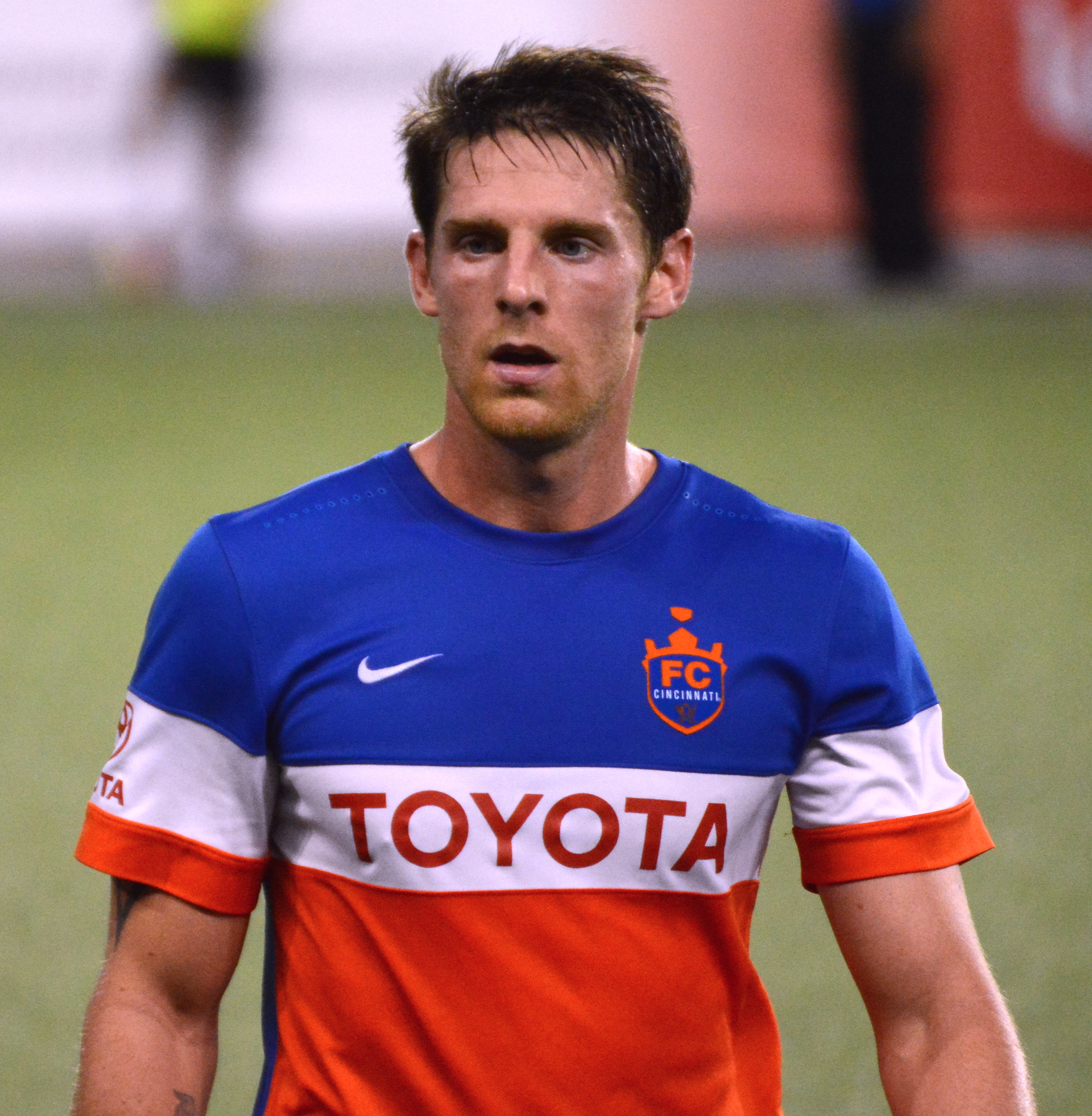
- Fordyce playing for FC Cincinnati in 2017

Personal information
- Full name: Daryl Thomas Fordyce
- Date of birth: 2 January 1987 (age 39)
- Place of birth: Belfast, Northern Ireland
- Positions: Midfielder; forward

Youth career
- St Andrews
- Lisburn Youth
- Portsmouth

Senior career*
Years	Team	Apps	(Gls)
2005–2007	Portsmouth	0	(0)
2006	→ AFC Bournemouth (loan)	3	(0)
2007–2011	Glentoran	201	(47)
2011–2013	Linfield	62	(15)
2013–2016	FC Edmonton	96	(28)
2017	FC Cincinnati	9	(0)
2017	FC Edmonton	14	(2)
2019	Sligo Rovers	29	(2)
2020–2022	Valour FC	56	(4)
Total		470	(98)

International career
- Northern Ireland U19
2006–2008	Northern Ireland U21	12	(2)
- * Club domestic league appearances and goals

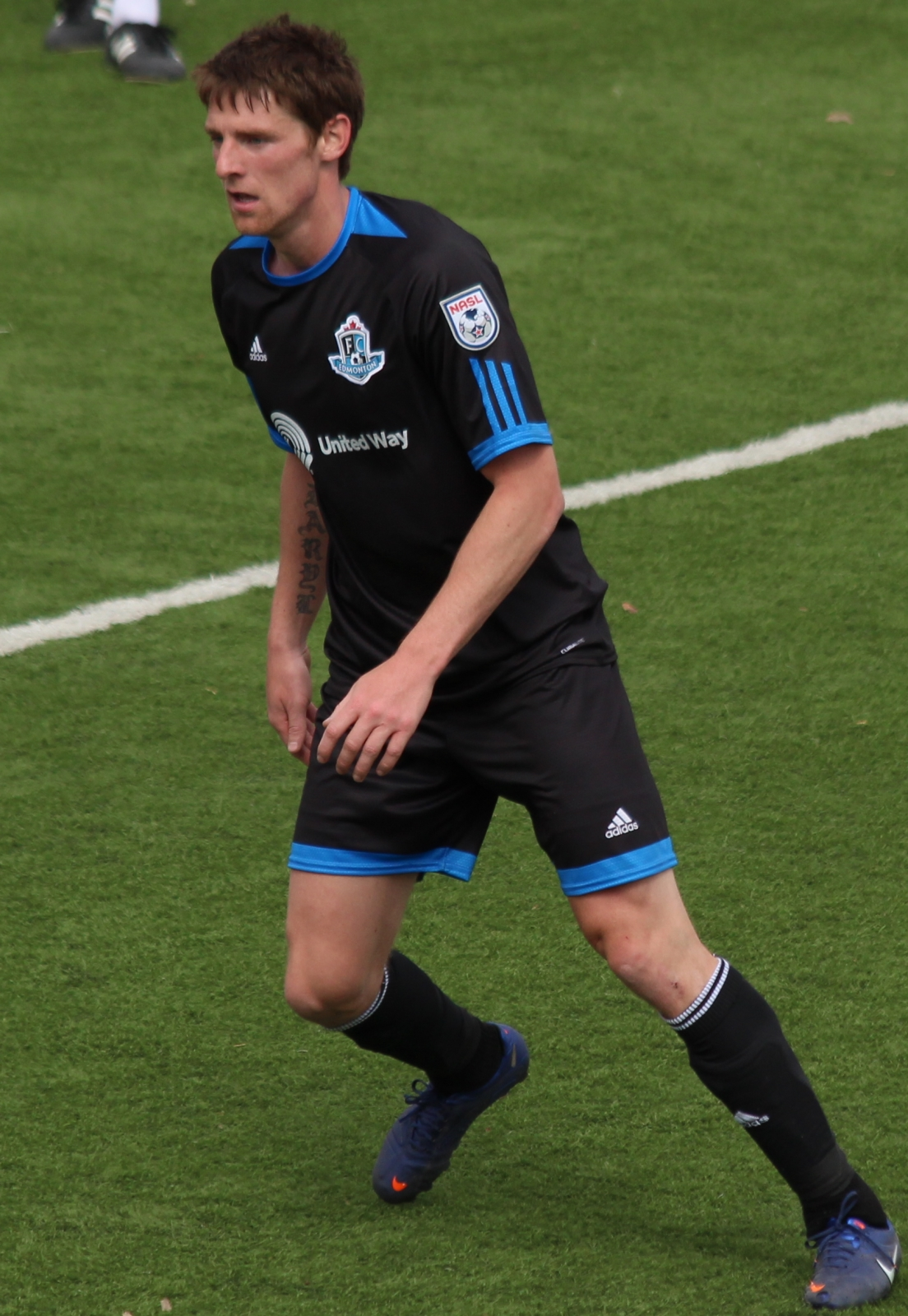
Fordyce playing for FC Edmonton in 2013

Daryl Thomas Fordyce (born 2 January 1987) is a Northern Irish former professional footballer who played as a midfielder. He was an assistant coach at Valour FC.

== Club career ==
=== Early career ===
Fordyce played for St Andrews and Lisburn Youth in Northern Ireland, winning major trophies with both teams when he was younger. He later joined Portsmouth. Working his way up through the club's youth ranks, Fordyce spent the second half of the 2005–06 season on loan at AFC Bournemouth before going back to Portsmouth.

=== Glentoran ===
In July 2007, he signed for Glentoran in Northern Ireland. At the beginning of the Irish League 2010/11 season he scored five goals against Lisburn Distillery in the first game of the season in a 6–1 win. Fordyce agreed a deal with Linfield just after the end of 2010/11 season, although he was in contract re-negotiations with Glentoran.

=== Linfield ===
In 2012, Fordyce won the league title with Linfield after defeating Portadown 2–1 on 7 April. The team also won the Irish Cup for a record 42nd time, defeating Crusaders 4–1 in the final. Though Fordyce did not score in the final, he did score in Linfield's 5–1 defeat over Carrick Rangers.

=== FC Edmonton ===
On 18 January 2013, it was announced that Fordyce, along with his teammate Albert Watson, would not return to Linfield in the following season, instead seeking new playing opportunities in Canada. On 25 February 2013, it was reported that both would join FC Edmonton. After four seasons in Edmonton, Fordyce left the club as its all-time leading scorer, a title which he still holds to this day.

=== FC Cincinnati ===
The United Soccer League club FC Cincinnati announced that it had signed Fordyce on 16 January 2017. After little playing time with FC Cincinnati, Fordyce was released by the club in June 2017.

=== Return to Edmonton ===
Shortly after, Fordyce re-signed with FC Edmonton. After the 2017 season, with the future of FC Edmonton and the NASL in doubt, Fordyce was released from FC Edmonton.

=== Sligo Rovers ===
On 8 February 2019, Fordyce signed a one-year contract with the League of Ireland Premier Division side Sligo Rovers. That season, he made 29 league appearances, scoring two goals, while making two appearances in the FAI Cup and one in the League of Ireland Cup.

=== Valour FC ===
On 10 January 2020, Fordyce signed with the Canadian Premier League side Valour FC. He made his debut for Valour in their season opener on August 16 against Cavalry FC. He scored his first goal for Valour against his former club FC Edmonton on August 29, helping his team to a 2–1 victory. Fordyce retired from professional football in January 2023.

== Managerial career ==
One month after retiring on February 15, 2023, Fordyce was announced as assistant coach and coordinator of youth development.

== International career ==
Fordyce has represented Northern Ireland at Under-19 level, scoring both goals in the 2–1 European U19 Championship victory over Moldova in October 2005. He also scored four goals for Northern Ireland U-19 against Serbia & Montenegro.

He has made five appearances for the Northern Ireland national under-21 football team, scoring against Germany in November 2006.

== Career statistics ==
Updated October 12, 2022
Club	Season	League			Cup		Playoffs		Continental		Total	
Club	Season	Division	Apps	Goals	Apps	Goals	Apps	Goals	Apps	Goals	Apps	Goals
AFC Bournemouth	2005-06	EFL League One	3	0	0	0	0	0	0	0	3	0
Glentoran	2008-09	NIFL Premiership	0	0	0	0	0	0	2	0	2	0
Glentoran	2009-10	NIFL Premiership	32	4	0	0	0	0	2	0	36	4
Glentoran	2010-11	NIFL Premiership	32	15	0	0	5	2	2	0	39	17
Glentoran	Total		64	19	0	0	5	2	6	0	77	21
Linfield	2011-12	NIFL Premiership	26	6	0	0	5	1	2	1	33	8
Linfield	2012-13	NIFL Premiership	21	3	0	0	0	0	3	0	24	3
Linfield	Total		47	9	0	0	5	1	5	1	57	11
FC Edmonton	2013	NASL	24	7	2	0	0	0	0	0	26	7
FC Edmonton	2014	NASL	15	2	4	2	0	0	0	0	19	4
FC Edmonton	2015	NASL	21	8	4	2	0	0	0	0	25	10
FC Edmonton	2016	NASL	30	7	2	0	1	0	0	0	33	7
FC Edmonton	Total		90	24	12	4	1	0	0	0	103	28
FC Cincinnati	2017	USL	9	0	0	0	0	0	0	0	9	0
FC Edmonton	2017	NASL	14	2	0	0	0	0	0	0	14	2
FC Edmonton	Total		104	26	12	4	1	0	0	0	117	30
Sligo Rovers	2019	League of Ireland Premier Division	29	2	5	0	0	0	0	0	34	2
Valour FC	2020	Canadian Premier League	5	1	0	0	0	0	0	0	5	1
Valour FC	2021	Canadian Premier League	26	2	2	0	0	0	0	0	28	2
Valour FC	2022	Canadian Premier League	25	1	1	0	0	0	0	0	26	1
Valour FC	Total		56	4	3	0	0	0	0	0	59	4
	Total		317	60	20	4	11	3	11	1	363	69
