= Kampong Chhnang FC =

Cambodian football club

Kampong Chhnang
- Full name: Kampong Chhnang Football Club
- Nickname(s): The Potters
- Ground: Kampong Tralach High School
- League: Hun Sen Cup

Kampong Chhnang Football Club (Khmer: ខេត្តកំពង់ឆ្នាំង) is a football club based in Kampong Chhnang Province, Cambodia. The club competes in the Hun Sen Cup, the major national cup competition, from the provintial stage. Its women's section plays in the Cambodian Women's League.
