= 2013 New York Cosmos season =

Sports team season

New York Cosmos
2013 season
- Chairman: Seamus O'Brien
- Head coach: Giovanni Savarese
- Stadium: Shuart Stadium
- NASL: Spring: Did not enter Fall: 1st Combined: 5th
- Soccer Bowl: Champions
- U.S. Open Cup: Did not enter
- Top goalscorer: League: Diomar Díaz; Marcos Senna (5 goals); All: Marcos Senna (6 goals)
- Highest home attendance: 11,929 vs. FTL (August 3)
- Lowest home attendance: 5,409 vs. CAR (October 12)
- Average home league attendance: 6,859
Home colors	Away colors

The 2013 New York Cosmos season was the first season of the new team playing in the new North American Soccer League. Including the previous franchise, this was the sixteenth season of the club playing professional soccer in the New York metropolitan area. The Cosmos sat out the league's spring season, joining for the second half of the year. They won the Fall Championship, and became the 2013 NASL Champions by winning the Soccer Bowl.

== Background ==
The second version of the New York Cosmos came into existence during the summer of 2010. During the 2011 and 2012 calendar years, several youth teams and one tributary team under the Cosmos name played in an array of matches. The last season an organized team under the name "New York Cosmos" competed in any sort of professional level is 1985, nearly thirty years ago, when the Cosmos operated as an independent soccer club.

== Review ==
=== June ===
On June 18, 2013, Cosmos played their first friendly of the season, defeating Newtown Pride FC 6–0.

=== July ===
On July 1, former United States men's national soccer team midfielder Danny Szetela agreed to join the Cosmos.

On July 19, Cosmos signed Brazilian centre back Rovérsio.

On July 21, the Cosmos played their second friendly of the season against Old Carthusians in London, England. The final score was 4–1 to Cosmos.

Three days later on July 24, Cosmos played their second friendly in England against Leyton Orient, losing 2–1.

The Cosmos then played their third and final friendly in England against Gillingham, drawing 1–1.

== Club ==
=== Roster ===
No.	Position	Nation	Player
1	GK	USA	Jimmy Maurer
2	DF	USA	Hunter Freeman
3	DF	USA	Hunter Gorskie
4	DF	USA	Carlos Mendes
6	DF	BRA	Rovérsio
5	MF	CMR	Joseph Nane
7	MF	ESP	Ayoze
8	MF	VEN	Diomar Díaz
11	FW	USA	Peri Marošević
12	GK	USA	Chad Calderone
13	MF	USA	Sebastian Guenzatti
14	MF	USA	Danny Szetela
15	DF	USA	Korey Veeder
16	MF	USA	Dane Murphy
17	FW	BUL	Stefan Dimitrov
18	FW	GUA	Henry López
19	MF	ESP	Marcos Senna
20	DF	USA	Chris Rodd
21	FW	COL	David Diosa
22	FW	ITA	Alessandro Noselli
23	DF	COL	Juan Gonzalez
24	GK	USA	Kyle Reynish
25	MF	USA	Hagop Chirishian
26	FW	JPN	Satoru Kashiwase (on loan from Shimizu S-Pulse)
27	FW	USA	Jemal Johnson
30	MF	BRA	Paulo Ferreira-Mendes

=== Team management ===
Front Office and Ownership
Honorary President	(Brazil) Pelé
Chairman & CEO	(United States) Seamus O'Brien
Chief Operating Officer	(United States) Erik Stover
International Ambassador	(Brazil) Carlos Alberto
International Ambassador	(United States) Shep Messing
Financial Controller	(United States) Kevin Kletz
Marketing Manager	(United States) Sofia Sanchez
Social Media Manager	(United States) Chris Thomas
Coaching staff
Head Coach	(Venezuela) Giovanni Savarese

Last updated: January 5, 2013
Source: New York Cosmos Official Website

== Competitions ==
=== Preseason ===
June 18, 2013 Preseason	Newtown Pride	0–6	New York Cosmos	New Britain, Connecticut
EDT UTC−4		Report	Ayoze 32'; López 55'; Noselli 70'; Edison Bilbao 79'; Diosa 86'; P. Mendes 90'	Stadium: Veterans Stadium

July 21, 2013 Preseason	Old Carthusians	1–4	New York Cosmos	London, England
EDT UTC−4	Beddows 82' (pen.)	Report	Guenzatti 8'; Noselli 20'; Noselli 22'; Senna 35' (pen.)	Stadium: Charterhouse School Stadium

July 24, 2013 Preseason	Leyton Orient	2–1	New York Cosmos	London, England
14:30 EDT UTC−4	Mooney 23'; Lisbie 59' (pen.)	Report	Guenzatti 74'	Stadium: Brisbane Road; Attendance: 2,004; Referee: Stuart Attwell

July 26, 2013 Preseason	Gillingham	1–1	New York Cosmos	Gillingham, England
	Birchall 90'	Report	Dimitrov 20'	Stadium: Priestfield Stadium; Attendance: 0Behind Closed Doors

=== NASL Spring Season ===
The Cosmos did not compete in the NASL spring season.

=== NASL Fall Season ===
==== Standings ====
Pos	Team	Pld	W	D	L	GF	GA	GD	Pts	Qualification
1	New York Cosmos (F)	14	9	4	1	22	12	+10	31	Soccer Bowl 2013
2	Carolina RailHawks	14	7	2	5	21	16	+5	23	
3	Tampa Bay Rowdies	14	5	5	4	30	27	+3	20	
4	Minnesota United FC	14	6	2	6	21	19	+2	20	
5	Fort Lauderdale Strikers	14	5	3	6	18	20	−2	18	
6	FC Edmonton	14	3	7	4	13	14	−1	16	
7	Atlanta Silverbacks	14	4	4	6	14	22	−8	16	
8	San Antonio Scorpions	14	3	1	10	15	24	−9	10	

Source: NASL Standings
Rules for classification: 1) points; 2) goal difference; 3) number of goals scored.
(F) Fall season champion

==== Results summary ====
Overall								Home						Away					
Pld	W	D	L	GF	GA	GD	Pts	W	D	L	GF	GA	GD	W	D	L	GF	GA	GD
15	10	4	1	23	12	+11	34	5	2	0	15	7	+8	5	2	1	8	5	+3

Last updated: November 14, 2013.
Source: NASL

===== Results by round =====
Round	1	2	3	4	5	6	7	8	9	10	11	12	13	14	15
Stadium	H	A	A	H	A	H	H	A	H	A	H	H	A	A	A
Result	W	D	L	W	D	D	W	W	W	W	W	D	W	W	W
Position	2	4	6	2	3	4	1	1	1	1	1	1	1	1	C

Updated to match(es) played on November 13, 2013. Source: NYCosmos.com
A = Away; H = Home; W = Win; D = Draw; L = Loss; C = Champion

==== Match reports ====
August 3, 2013 Match 1	New York Cosmos	2–1	Fort Lauderdale Strikers	Hempstead, New York
19:00 EDT UTC−4	Senna (yellow card) 36'; Marošević 44'; Ayoze (yellow card) 75'; Freeman (yellow card) 77'; Noselli 90+3'	Report	Salazar (yellow card) 44'; Gordon (yellow card) 60'; Restrepo 73' (yellow card) 77'	Stadium: Shuart Stadium; Attendance: 11,929; Referee: (United States) Mark Geiger

August 10, 2013 Match 2	Tampa Bay Rowdies	0–0	New York Cosmos	St. Petersburg, Florida
19:30 EDT UTC−4	Hristov (yellow card) 41'; Mulholland (yellow card) 37' (yellow-red card) 90+3'	Report	Veeder (yellow card) 28'; Noselli (yellow card) 70'	Stadium: Al Lang Stadium; Attendance: 7,032; Referee: (United States) Sorin Stoica

August 17, 2013 Match 3	Carolina RailHawks	3–0	New York Cosmos	Cary, North Carolina
19:00 EDT UTC−4	Shriver 8', 28'; Graye (yellow card) 24' da Luz (yellow card) 26' (yellow-red card) 45+2'; Millington (yellow card) 64'; James (yellow card) 87'; Ackley 89' (pen.)	Report	Freeman (yellow card) 22'; Noselli (yellow card) 32'; Nane (yellow card) 44' (yellow-red card) 44'; Rovérsio (yellow card) 67'; Szetela (yellow card) 70'; Guenzatti (red card) 90+3'	Stadium: WakeMed Soccer Park; Attendance: 4,096; Referee: (United States) Mark Kadlecik

August 24, 2013 Match 4	New York Cosmos	2–1	San Antonio Scorpions	Hempstead, New York
19:00 EDT UTC−4	Díaz (yellow card) 7' (goal) 42'; López 90+2'	Report	Janicki (yellow card) 8' (yellow-red card) 52'; Harmse (yellow card) 37'; Phelan (yellow card) 45+1'; Ramírez (yellow card) 45+3'; Zahorski 64'	Stadium: Shuart Stadium; Attendance: 6,852; Referee: (United States) José Rivero

September 1, 2013 Match 5	FC Edmonton	1–1	New York Cosmos	Edmonton, Alberta
16:00 EDT UTC−4	Nurse 60'	Report	Senna 79'	Stadium: Clarke Stadium; Attendance: 3,180; Referee: (United States) Sheena Dickson

September 7, 2013 Match 6	New York Cosmos	1–1	Atlanta Silverbacks	Hempstead, New York
19:00 EDT UTC−4	Szetela (yellow card) 9'; Gorskie (yellow card) 38'; Senna 44' (pen.)	Report	Mendes (yellow card) 42' (yellow-red card) 90+2'; Moroney 49'; Stisser (yellow card) 64'; Luna (yellow card) 90+4'	Stadium: Shuart Stadium; Attendance: 5,598; Referee: (United States) Daniel Radford

September 14, 2013 Match 7	New York Cosmos	1–0	Minnesota United FC	Hempstead, New York
19:00 EDT UTC−4	Rovérsio (yellow card) 69'; Guenzatti 77'; Freeman (red card) 80'	Report	Pitchkolan (yellow card) 31'; Dias (yellow card) 71'; Ibarra (yellow card) 77'	Stadium: Shuart Stadium; Attendance: 6,081; Referee: (United States) Robert Sibiga

September 21, 2013 Match 8	Fort Lauderdale Strikers	0–2	New York Cosmos	Fort Lauderdale, Florida
19:30 EDT UTC−4	Ståhl (yellow card) 24'; Guerrero (yellow card) 53'; Pérez (yellow card) 69'; Núñez (yellow card) 89'	Report	Díaz 10', 33'; Senna (yellow card) 35'; Guenzatti (yellow card) 73' (yellow-red card) 90+1'; Ayoze (yellow card) 77'	Stadium: Lockhart Stadium; Attendance: 7,653; Referee: (United States) Younes Marrakchi

September 29, 2013 Match 9	New York Cosmos	4–3	Tampa Bay Rowdies	Hempstead, New York
17:00 EDT UTC−4	Marošević 23'; Paulo 63'; Díaz 80' (yellow card) 80'; Senna 82'; Ayoze (yellow card) 88'	Report	Mulholland 20' (yellow card) 87'; Hristov 34'; Mkosana 45+1'	Stadium: Shuart Stadium; Attendance: 6,518; Referee: (Canada) Geoff Gamble

October 5, 2013 Match 10	Minnesota United FC	0–1	New York Cosmos	Blaine, Minnesota
20:30 EDT UTC−4	Kallman (yellow card) 50'	Report	Freeman (yellow card) 27'; Ayoze (yellow card) 39'; Paulo 53'	Stadium: National Sports Center; Attendance: 3,629; Referee: (United States) Mark Kadlecik

October 12, 2013 Match 11	New York Cosmos	4–0	Carolina RailHawks	Hempstead, New York
19:00 EDT UTC−4	Szetela 8'; Díaz 53'; Paulo (yellow card) 70'; Senna 76' (pen.); Noselli 90'	Report	Hamilton (yellow card) 68'	Stadium: Shuart Stadium; Attendance: 5,409; Referee: (United States) Jorge González

October 20, 2013 Match 12	New York Cosmos	1–1	FC Edmonton	Hempstead, New York
16:00 EDT UTC−4	Senna (yellow card) 59'; Szetela (yellow card) 72'; Noselli 78'	Report	Proctor (yellow card) 60' (goal) 90'; Fordyce (yellow card) 66'; Nurse (yellow card) 71'; Mirabelli (yellow card) 76'	Stadium: Shuart Stadium; Attendance: 5,624; Referee: (United States) José Carlos Rivero

October 26, 2013 Match 13	San Antonio Scorpions	1–2	New York Cosmos	San Antonio, Texas
20:30 EDT UTC−4	Zahorski 3' (yellow card) 65'; Wagner (yellow card) 34'; Rubiato (yellow card) 64'		Senna 52'; Díaz (yellow card) 52'; Dimitrov 54' (yellow card) 54'; Murphy (red card) 74'; Freeman (yellow card) 74'; Szetela (yellow card) 76'	Stadium: Toyota Field; Attendance: 7,702; Referee: (United States) Juan Guzmán

November 2, 2013 Match 14	Atlanta Silverbacks	0–1	New York Cosmos	Chamblee, Georgia
19:30 EDT UTC−4	Gulley (yellow card) 15'; Caceres (yellow card) 29'	Report	López 34'; Rodd (yellow card) 38'	Stadium: Atlanta Silverbacks Park; Attendance: 5,000; Referee: (United States) Mathew Foerster

=== Soccer Bowl ===
November 9, 2013	Atlanta Silverbacks	0–1	New York Cosmos	Chamblee, Georgia
19:00 EDT UTC−4	Carr (yellow card) 42'; Navarro (yellow card) 82'	Report	Szetela (yellow card) 11'; Freeman (yellow card) 45+'; Senna 50'	Stadium: Atlanta Silverbacks Park; Attendance: 7,211; Referee: (United States) Edvin Jurisevic

=== Post-Season Friendly ===
November 13, 2013 Marcos Senna; Tribute Match	Villarreal CF	3–0	New York Cosmos	Villarreal, Spain
	Perbet 10'; Juanto 83'; Uche 87'	Announcement; Report		Stadium: Estadio El Madrigal; Attendance: 11,000

=== U.S. Open Cup ===
The Cosmos did not compete in the 2013 edition of the Open Cup.

== Squad statistics ==
As of Match played November 9, 2013

=== Appearances and goals ===
No.	Pos	Nat	Player	Total		NASL Fall Season		Soccer Bowl	
No.	Pos	Nat	Player	Apps	Goals	Apps	Goals	Apps	Goals
1	GK	(United States) USA	Jimmy Maurer	1	0	1+0	0	0+0	0
2	DF	(United States) USA	Hunter Freeman	13	0	12+0	0	1+0	0
3	DF	(United States) USA	Hunter Gorskie	8	0	8+0	0	0+0	0
4	DF	(United States) USA	Carlos Mendes	14	0	13+0	0	1+0	0
5	MF	(Cameroon) CMR	Joseph Nane	10	0	5+4	0	0+1	0
6	DF	(Brazil) BRA	Rovérsio	12	0	10+1	0	1+0	0
7	MF	(Spain) ESP	Ayoze	14	0	12+1	0	1+0	0
8	MF	(Venezuela) VEN	Diomar Díaz	13	5	9+3	5	1+0	0
11	FW	(United States) USA	Peri Marošević	8	2	6+2	2	0+0	0
13	MF	(Uruguay) URU	Sebastian Guenzatti	11	1	8+2	1	1+0	0
14	MF	(United States) USA	Daniel Szetela	13	1	10+2	1	1+0	0
15	DF	(United States) USA	Korey Veeder	4	0	4+0	0	0+0	0
16	MF	(United States) USA	Dane Murphy	3	0	0+2	0	0+1	0
17	FW	(Bulgaria) BUL	Stefan Dimitrov	12	1	9+2	1	1+0	0
18	FW	(Guatemala) GUA	Henry López	5	2	1+4	2	0+0	0
19	MF	(Spain) ESP	Marcos Senna	14	6	13+0	5	1+0	1
20	DF	(United States) USA	Chris Rodd	2	0	1+1	0	0+0	0
21	FW	(Colombia) COL	David Diosa	1	0	0+1	0	0+0	0
22	FW	(Italy) ITA	Alessandro Noselli	10	3	4+5	3	0+1	0
23	MF	(Colombia) COL	Juan González	1	0	1+0	0	0+0	0
24	GK	(United States) USA	Kyle Reynish	14	0	13+0	0	1+0	0
25	MF	(United States) USA	Hagop Chirishian	7	0	4+3	0	0+0	0
26	FW	(Japan) JPN	Satoru Kashiwase	4	0	2+2	0	0+0	0
27	FW	(United States) USA	Jemal Pierre Johnson	1	0	0+1	0	0+0	0
28	MF	(Chile) CHI	Edison Bilbao	1	0	1+0	0	0+0	0
30	MF	(Brazil) BRA	Paulo Ferreira-Mendes	8	2	6+1	2	1+0	0
33	DF	(United States) USA	James Nealis	1	0	1+0	0	0+0	0
Players who appeared for the New York Cosmos who are no longer at the club:

=== Goal scorers ===
Place	Position	Nation	Number	Name	NASL Fall Season	Soccer Bowl	Total
1	MF	(Spain)	19	Marcos Senna	5	1	6
2	MF	(Venezuela)	8	Diomar Díaz	5	0	5
3	FW	(Italy)	22	Alessandro Noselli	3	0	3
4	FW	(Bosnia and Herzegovina)	11	Peri Marošević	2	0	2
4	FW	(Guatemala)	18	Henry López	2	0	2
4	MF	(Brazil)	30	Paulo Ferreira-Mendes	2	0	2
7	MF	(Uruguay)	13	Sebastian Guenzatti	1	0	1
7	MF	(United States)	14	Daniel Szetela	1	0	1
7	FW	(Bulgaria)	17	Stefan Dimitrov	1	0	1
TOTALS					22	1	23

=== Disciplinary record ===
Number	Nation	Position	Name	NASL Fall Season		Soccer Bowl		Total	
Number	Nation	Position	Name	Yellow card	Red card	Yellow card	Red card	Yellow card	Red card
2	(United States)	DF	Hunter Freeman	4	1	1	0	5	1
3	(United States)	DF	Hunter Gorskie	1	0	0	0	1	0
5	(Cameroon)	MF	Joseph Nane	2	1	0	0	2	1
6	(Brazil)	DF	Rovérsio	2	0	0	0	2	0
7	(Spain)	MF	Ayoze	4	0	0	0	4	0
8	(Venezuela)	MF	Diomar Díaz	3	0	0	0	3	0
13	(Uruguay)	MF	Sebastián Guenzatti	2	2	0	0	2	2
14	(United States)	MF	Daniel Szetela	4	0	1	0	5	0
15	(United States)	DF	Korey Veeder	1	0	0	0	1	0
16	(United States)	MF	Dane Murphy	0	1	0	0	0	1
17	(Bulgaria)	FW	Stefan Dimitrov	1	0	0	0	1	0
19	(Spain)	MF	Marcos Senna	3	0	0	0	3	0
20	(United States)	DF	Chris Rodd	1	0	0	0	1	0
22	(Italy)	FW	Alessandro Noselli	2	0	0	0	2	0
30	(Brazil)	MF	Paulo Ferreira-Mendes	1	0	0	0	1	0
			TOTALS	31	5	2	0	33	5

== Transfers ==
=== In ===
No.	Pos.	Player	Transferred from	Fee/notes	Date	Source
17	FW	(Bulgaria) Stefan Dimitrov	(United States) New York Pancyprian-Freedoms	Free	January 30, 2011	
16	MF	(United States) Dane Murphy	(Germany) VfL Osnabrück	Free	January 30, 2011	
4	DF	(United States) Carlos Mendes	(United States) Columbus Crew	Free	December 11, 2012	
24	GK	(United States) Kyle Reynish	(United States) Real Salt Lake	Free	January 31, 2013	
7	FW	(Spain) Ayoze García	(Spain) Sporting de Gijón	Free	February 8, 2013	
2	DF	(United States) Hunter Freeman	(United States) Colorado Rapids	Free	February 12, 2013	
15	DF	(United States) Korey Veeder	(United States) Columbus Crew	Free	February 13, 2013	
11	FW	(Bosnia and Herzegovina) Peri Marošević	(Croatia) NK Junak Sinj	Free	February 21, 2013	
18	FW	(Guatemala) Henry David López	(Brazil) Esporte Clube Noroeste	Free	February 21, 2013	
5	MF	(Cameroon) Joseph Nane	(United States) Colorado Rapids	Free	March 12, 2013	
23	DF	(Colombia) Juan González	Free agent	Free	March 12, 2013	
3	DF	(United States) Hunter Gorskie	Free agent	Free	April 26, 2013	
	GK	(United States) Jimmy Maurer	(Chile) C.D. Universidad de Concepción	Free	April 26, 2013	
	GK	(United States) Chad Calderone	(United States) New York Pancyprian-Freedoms	Free	April 26, 2013	
8	MF	(Venezuela) Diomar Díaz	(Venezuela) Atlético Club Mineros de Guayana	Free	May 2, 2013	

=== Out ===
No.	Pos.	Player	Transferred to	Fee/notes	Date	Source
	MF	(United States) Armando Gaitan	(United States) Free agent	Free		

=== Loan out ===
No.	Pos.	Player	Transferred to	Fee/notes	Date	Source
11	FW	(Bulgaria) Stefan Dimitrov	(United States) Fort Lauderdale Strikers	On loan for the duration of the NASL spring season	March 8, 2013	
