= List of North American Soccer League transfers 2013 =

The following is a list of transfers for the 2013 North American Soccer League Fall Season.

== Transfers ==
Date	Name	Moving from	Moving to	Mode of Transfer
December 11, 2012	(United States) Carlos Mendes	Unattached	New York Cosmos	Free
January 31, 2013	(United States) Kyle Reynish	Unattached	New York Cosmos	Free
January 31, 2013	(Bulgaria) Stefan Dimitrov	Unattached	New York Cosmos	Free
February 8, 2013	(Spain) Ayoze	Unattached	New York Cosmos	Free
February 12, 2013	(United States) Hunter Freeman	Unattached	New York Cosmos	Free
February 13, 2013	(United States) Korey Veeder	Unattached	New York Cosmos	Free
February 13, 2013	(United States) Dane Murphy	Unattached	New York Cosmos	Free
February 21, 2013	(United States) Peri Marošević	Unattached	New York Cosmos	Free
February 21, 2013	(Guatemala) Henry López	Unattached	New York Cosmos	Free
March 12, 2013	(Cameroon) Joseph Nane	Unattached	New York Cosmos	Free
March 12, 2013	(Colombia) Juan Gonzalez	Unattached	New York Cosmos	Free
April 26, 2013	(United States) Jimmy Maurer	Unattached	New York Cosmos	Free
April 26, 2013	(United States) Hunter Gorskie	Unattached	New York Cosmos	Free
April 26, 2013	(United States) Chad Calderone	Unattached	New York Cosmos	Free
May 2, 2013	(Venezuela) Diomar Díaz	Unattached	New York Cosmos	Free
June 7, 2013	(United States) Chris Rodd	Unattached	New York Cosmos	Free
June 7, 2013	(United States) Jemal Johnson	Unattached	New York Cosmos	Free
June 11, 2013	(Japan) Satoru Kashiwase	(Japan) Shimizu S-Pulse	New York Cosmos	Loan
June 13, 2013	(Spain) Marcos Senna	Unattached	New York Cosmos	Free
July 1, 2013	(United States) Danny Szetela	Unattached	New York Cosmos	Free
July 1, 2013	(United States) Hagop Chirishian	Unattached	New York Cosmos	Free
July 5, 2013	(Colombia) David Diosa	Unattached	New York Cosmos	Free
July 5, 2013	(Uruguay) Sebastián Guenzatti	Unattached	New York Cosmos	Free
July 11, 2013	(United States) Chris Klute	Atlanta Silverbacks	(United States) Colorado Rapids	Undisclosed
July 12, 2013	(United States) Mark Bloom	Atlanta Silverbacks	(Canada) Toronto FC	Loan
July 17, 2013	(Italy) Alessandro Noselli	Unattached	New York Cosmos	Free
July 17, 2013	(Scotland) Calum Mallace	(Canada) Montreal Impact	Minnesota United	Loan
July 17, 2013	(Bosnia and Herzegovina) Siniša Ubiparipović	(Canada) Montreal Impact	Minnesota United	Loan
July 19, 2013	(Spain) Borja Rubiato	Unattached	San Antonio Scorpions	Free
July 19, 2013	(Brazil) Rovérsio	Unattached	New York Cosmos	Free
July 23, 2013	(Poland) Tomasz Zahorski	Unattached	San Antonio Scorpions	Free
July 23, 2013	(Mexico) Richard Sánchez	(United States) FC Dallas	Fort Lauderdale Strikers	Loan
July 25, 2013	(United States) Floyd Franks	Carolina RailHawks	Minnesota United	Trade
July 25, 2013	(United States) Bryan Arguez	Minnesota United	Carolina RailHawks	Trade
July 26, 2013	(United States) Bryan Gaul	(United States) Los Angeles Galaxy	Fort Lauderdale Strikers	Loan
July 26, 2013	(United States) Kenney Walker	(United States) Los Angeles Galaxy	Fort Lauderdale Strikers	Loan
July 26, 2013	(Uruguay) Enzo Martínez	(United States) Real Salt Lake	Carolina RailHawks	Loan
July 26, 2013	(Brazil) Rafael Alves	(United States) Ocala Stampede	Fort Lauderdale Strikers	Loan
August 1, 2013	(Malta) Etienne Barbara	(United States) Minnesota United	Tampa Bay Rowdies	Free
August 1, 2013	(United States) Mike Ambersley	(United States) Tampa Bay Rowdies	Minnesota United	Free
August 8, 2013	(United States) Bryce Montes	(United States) Colorado Rapids U18s DA	available rightback	Free
