= Soccer Bowl 2013 =

Soccer match

- Event: Soccer Bowl
Atlanta Silverbacks	New York Cosmos
0	1
- Date: November 9, 2013
- Venue: Atlanta Silverbacks Park, Atlanta, Georgia, United States
- Man of the Match: Marcos Senna (NYC)
- Referee: Edvin Jurisevic
- Attendance: 7,211

Soccer Bowl 2013 was the North American Soccer League's postseason championship match of the 2013 season held to determine the NASL Champion. The event was contested in a one-game match between the Atlanta Silverbacks, winners of the Spring Championship, and the New York Cosmos, winners of the Fall Championship. The game was held on November 9, 2013 at Atlanta Silverbacks Park, in Atlanta, Georgia. It was televised at 7:30pm EDT on ESPN3 and ESPN Deportes. New York won the match by the score of 1–0.

== Background ==
The Atlanta Silverbacks and the New York Cosmos respectively won the 2013 Spring Championship and Fall Championship. This earned both teams the right to compete for the NASL title. As Spring Champions, the Silverbacks also gained the right to host the event in their home field.

== Game summary ==
Set at Atlanta Silverbacks Park, the Atlanta Silverbacks and the New York Cosmos faced each other at Soccer Bowl 2013 for the NASL Championship in front of a sellout crowd of 7,211. The event was televised live in English on ESPN3 and in Spanish on ESPN Deportes. English commentators were JP Dellacamera and Janusz Michallik. They were joined by former Cosmos star and current MSG Soccer analyst Shep Messing. Spanish commentators were Richard Méndez and Robert Sierra. Head referee of the game was Edvin Jurisevic. Assistant referees were Anthony Vasoli and Brian Dunn. Fourth official was Ted Unkel. Silverbacks Head coach was Brian Haynes. Cosmos Head coach was Giovanni Savarese.

As the match started approximately at 7:30pm EDT, the two teams went head on to gain possession of the ball. For the first ten minutes the two teams battled for the offensive role. In the fifth minute Diomar Díaz made the early attempt for the Cosmos, but was soon defended by the Silverbacks. By the tenth minute, the Silverbacks gained a strong offense, as the Cosmos sought to quickly reverse the roles on the pitch. Borfor Carr sent a pass from the right side of the corner to the goal area, but was deflected by the Cosmos. Silverbacks' Brad Stisser continued the attack on goal which the 2013 NASL Golden Glove winner Kyle Reynish easily took care of.

Cosmos' Stefan Dimitrov followed in the 17th minute, with a shot of his own toward the left post which Silverbacks goalkeeper Joe Nasco dove to save. Two minutes later Cosmos defender Hunter Freeman took a corner kick from the near side, but it was sent out of the field. Still, New York continued to mount pressure, with Díaz challenging Nasco twice in a one-minute span. Díaz first placed a shot wide in the 21st minute then got under a cross from Carlos Mendes in the 22nd minute that was also sent wide. Soon after, from a cross sent by Freeman, Dimitrov had another great opportunity on net at the 28th minute which just soared over the frame. The Cosmos earned a free kick and in the 29th minute Marcos Senna took the shot, but it was sent into the arms of Nasco who was able to dive after it.

New York continued with the pressure on the Atlanta defense. In the 35th minute, Ayoze placed the ball into the goal area and Paulo Mendes made a connection, however, he could not redirect it into the net. Dimitriov made another attempt at goal in the 36th minute, which Nasco also grabbed. In the final minutes of the first half, Ayoze again sent the ball into the area, and Nasco managed to defend his post. At the half way mark, the game remained scoreless, with an amazing performance by Nasco who created a strong defense and made several saves throughout the night.

Returning in the second half, both teams were determined to once again gain the momentum shown in the first 45 minutes. After five minutes, the Cosmos finally broke through Nasco's undeniable defense. Ayoze took a free kick that reached the goal area, but was cleared by an Atlanta defender. The ball fell to Senna who stopped the ball's motion, methodically placed it on the ground, and with precision looped an 18-yard shot from the right side on the half volley which arched into the opposite upper 90 which Nasco could not reach in time. Goal in the 50th minute by the Cosmos.

Despite being down, the NASL Spring Champions, the Atlanta Silverbacks pressed on to regroup and make their mark. Danny Barrera drove an attack in the 61st minute, putting a ball across the face of the goal, but the Cosmos cleared it out for a corner, which they also successfully defended. In the 62nd minute, Mike Randolph’s cross into the area was headed high by Pedro Mendes whose attempt was the closest to making goal. By the 78th minute, Atlanta’s Shane Moroney managed to make it into the goal box, but Reynish quickly blocked Moroney's shot.

The night continued with a battle for possession, with both goalkeepers showing their value. With Atlanta holding the attack towards the latter part of the game, the Cosmos defended their lead. After 90 minutes of regular time, 5 minutes of stoppage was added. One minute later, Silverback's Barrera fielded a corner kick into the goal box, and Reynish punched it away. After several valiant attempts by the Silverbacks' the Cosmos held their line through the entire stoppage time. Head referee Edvin Jurisevic blew the final whistle and the New York Cosmos were declared the 2013 NASL Champions, with final score being 1–0.

During the post game ceremony, important NASL leaders including Commissioner Bill Peterson, and the President of the USSF and a leading FIFA member Sunil Gulati were on hand. President Gulati himself bestowed the Silverbacks' with honorary runners-up medals for being finalist. Gulati also presented the Cosmos players with their championship medals. Bill Peterson congratulated the club, and the Cosmos hoisted the Soccer Bowl trophy in the air in celebration of their new championship.

=== Championship results ===
November 9, 2013
19:30 EDT

Atlanta Silverbacks	0–1	New York Cosmos
	Report	Senna 50'

Atlanta Silverbacks Park, Atlanta, Georgia
Attendance: 7,211
Referee: Edvin Jurisevic

Atlanta Silverbacks	New York Cosmos

2013 NASL Champions: New York Cosmos

Atlanta Silverbacks:
GK	18	(United States) Joe Nasco
DF	3	(United States) Shane Moroney		(substituted off) 88'
DF	6	(United States) Beto Navarro	(yellow card) 82'
DF	4	(United States) Bobby Reiss
DF	2	(United States) Mike Randolph
MF	19	(Liberia) Borfor Carr	(yellow card) 42'	(substituted off) 57'
MF	5	(El Salvador) Richard Menjivar (c)
MF	14	(Argentina) Lucas Paulini
MF	10	(United States) Danny Barrera
FW	9	(Brazil) Pedro Mendes
FW	17	(United States) Brad Stisser		(substituted off) 82'
Substitutes:
GK	16	(Cameroon) Eric Ati
FW	1	(Mexico) Rubén Luna		(substituted on) 82'
MF	7	(United States) Pablo Cruz		(substituted on) 57'
MF	8	(United States) Milton Blanco
MF	12	(Jamaica) Horace James		(substituted on) 88'
DF	13	(United States) Willie Hunt
DF	27	(England) Martyn Lancaster
Manager:
(Trinidad and Tobago) Brian Haynes

New York Cosmos:
GK	24	(United States) Kyle Reynish
DF	2	(United States) Hunter Freeman	(yellow card) 45+1'
DF	4	(United States) Carlos Mendes (c)
DF	6	(Brazil) Rovérsio
DF	7	(Spain) Ayoze
MF	8	(Venezuela) Diomar Díaz
MF	19	(Spain) Marcos Senna
MF	14	(United States) Danny Szetela	(yellow card) 11'
MF	13	(Uruguay) Sebastián Guenzatti		(substituted off) 86'
FW	30	(Brazil) Paulo Mendes		(substituted off) 90+5'
FW	17	(Bulgaria) Stefan Dimitrov		(substituted off) 77'
Substitutes:
GK	1	(United States) Jimmy Maurer
MF	5	(Cameroon) Joseph Nane		(substituted on) 86'
FW	11	(United States) Peri Marošević
DF	15	(United States) Korey Veeder
MF	16	(United States) Dane Murphy		(substituted on) 90+5'
FW	22	(Italy) Alessandro Noselli		(substituted on) 77'
MF	25	(United States) Hagop Chirishian
Manager:
(Venezuela) Giovanni Savarese

Man of the Match:

Marcos Senna (New York Cosmos)

MATCH OFFICIALS

- Assistant referees:
  - Anthony Vasoli
  - Brian Dunn
- Fourth official: Ted Unkel

== See also ==
- 2013 in American soccer
- 2013 North American Soccer League season
