= Paulo Mendes =

Brazilian footballer

Personal information
- Full name: Paulo Ferreira-Mendes
- Date of birth: May 13, 1990 (age 36)
- Place of birth: Goiânia, Brazil
- Height: 1.83 m (6 ft 0 in)
- Position: Midfielder

Team information
- Current team: Puerto Rico FC
- Number: 11

Youth career
- 2009: Foothill College

Senior career*
Years	Team	Apps	(Gls)
2010–2011	DV8 Defenders		
2012	Rhode Island Reds		
2012	Cal FC		
2012	Atlanta Silverbacks	10	(1)
2013–2014	New York Cosmos	15	(3)
2014–2015	Atlanta Silverbacks	15	(0)
2016	Puerto Rico FC	21	(1)
- * Club domestic league appearances and goals as of 22 November 2016

Paulo Ferreira-Mendes (born May 13, 1990) is a Brazilian footballer who plays for Puerto Rico FC in the North American Soccer League.

== Club career ==
In 2012, Paulo Mendes and his twin brother Pedro signed with the Atlanta Silverbacks of the North American Soccer League after a successful stint at amateur side Cal FC, where he played in 2 Lamar Hunt U.S. Open Cup games. In his first season with Atlanta, Mendes played ten games, scoring once.

After the 2012 season, Paulo joined the New York Cosmos where he won the Fall Championship, where he scored twice in eight games. The Cosmos defeated the Silverbacks in 2013 Soccer Bowl.

In 2014, Paulo played seven games, scoring once, in the Spring Championship. The Cosmos attempted to send him on loan to Venezuelan Primera División side Metropolitanos FC but after the loan was never finalized, he and the Cosmos mutually agreed to part ways. He finished the 2014 season with the Atlanta Silverbacks.

On 26 February 2016 Paulo joined twin brother Pedro at Puerto Rico FC.

== Career statistics ==
As of match played 29 October 2016

Appearances and goals by club, season and competition
Club	Season	League			National Cup		Other		Total	
Club	Season	Division	Apps	Goals	Apps	Goals	Apps	Goals	Apps	Goals
Atlanta Silverbacks	2012	NASL	10	1	0	0	–		10	1
New York Cosmos	2013	NASL	8	2	0	0	–		8	2
New York Cosmos	2014	NASL	7	1	0	0	–		7	1
New York Cosmos	Total		15	3	0	0	-	-	15	3
Atlanta Silverbacks	2014	NASL	0	0	0	0	–		0	0
Atlanta Silverbacks	2015	NASL	15	0	0	0	–		15	0
Atlanta Silverbacks	Total		15	0	0	0	-	-	15	0
Puerto Rico FC	2016	NASL	21	1	0	0	–		21	1
Career total			61	5	0	0	-	-	61	5

== Honours ==
=== Club ===
New York Cosmos

- NASL 2013 Fall Championship
- NASL Soccer Bowl 2013
