= Giovanni Savarese =

Venezuelan footballer and manager (born 1971)

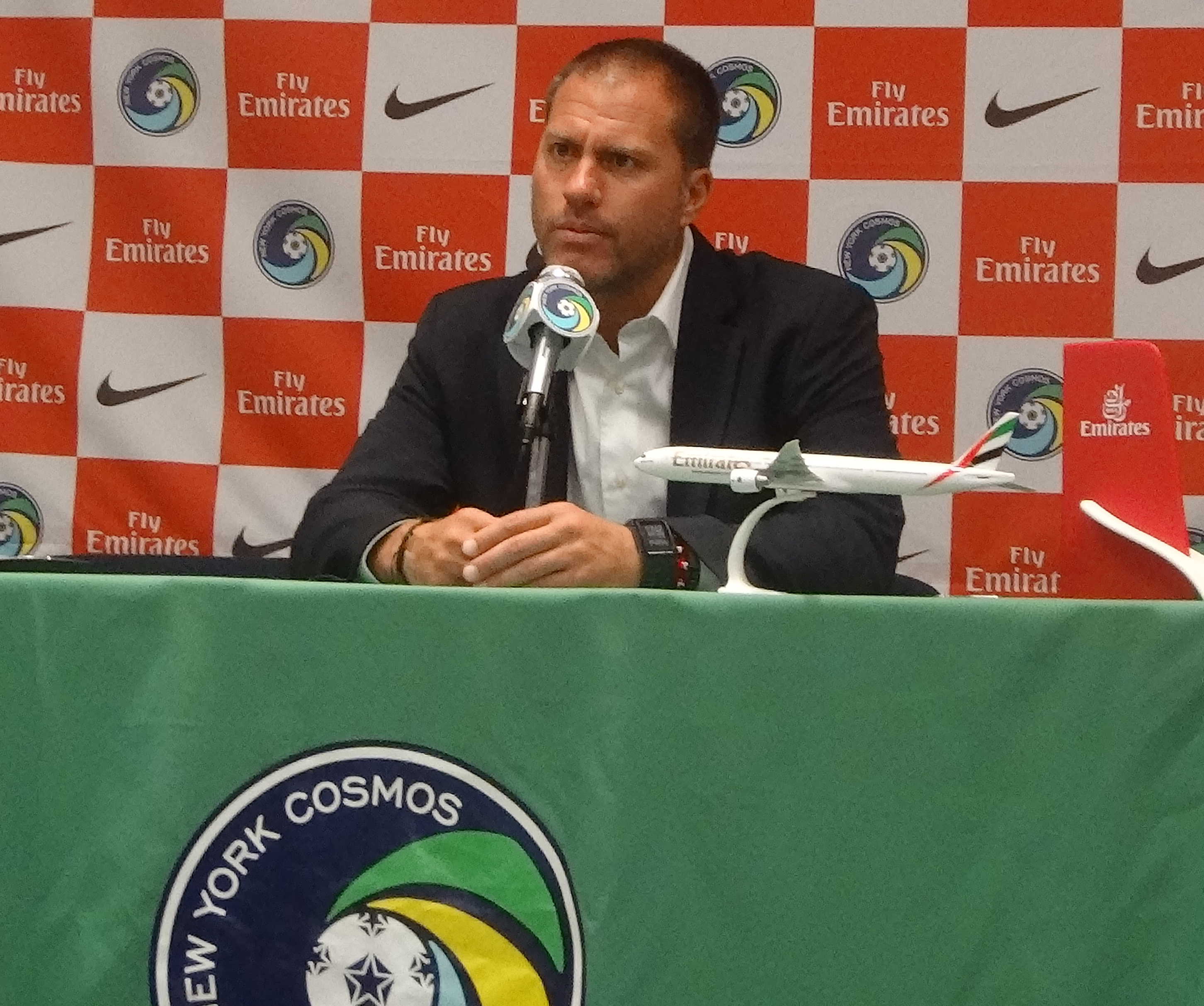
- Savarese in 2014

Personal information
- Full name: Giovanni Savarese
- Date of birth: July 14, 1971 (age 55)
- Place of birth: Caracas, Venezuela
- Height: 6 ft 1 in (1.85 m)
- Position: Forward

Youth career
- 1977–1985: Centro Italo Venezolano

College career
Years	Team	Apps	(Gls)
1990–1993	LIU Brooklyn Blackbirds		

Senior career*
Years	Team	Apps	(Gls)
1986–1989	Deportivo Italia	27	(7)
1990–1993	Greek American AA	45	(31)
1994–1995	Long Island Rough Riders	37	(27)
1996–1998	MetroStars	85	(41)
1998	Caracas	20	(18)
1999	New England Revolution	27	(10)
1999	Deportivo Táchira	5	(3)
2000	Perugia	0	(0)
2000	→ Viterbese (loan)	7	(0)
2000	San Jose Earthquakes	4	(0)
2000–2001	→ Swansea City (loan)	31	(11)
2001	Millwall	1	(0)
2002–2003	Deportivo Italchacao	22	(6)
2003	Sassari Torres	1	(0)
2004	Long Island Rough Riders	10	(5)
Total		322	(159)

International career
1989–2001	Venezuela	30	(10)

Managerial career
- 2012–2017: New York Cosmos
- 2017–2023: Portland Timbers
- 2026–: Melbourne Victory
- * Club domestic league appearances and goals

Giovanni Savarese (born July 14, 1971) is a Venezuelan football manager, analyst, and former player who is the head coach of A-League Men club Melbourne Victory.

He played professionally from 1986 to 2004, appearing for numerous clubs in Venezuela, the United States, Italy, Wales and England, earning 30 caps with the Venezuela national team.

Following retirement, Savarese served in coaching stints with New York Cosmos and Portland Timbers.

He has also worked as an on-air analyst for Major League Soccer matches, appearing on ESPN from 2006 to 2017 and on Apple TV since 2023.

== Club career ==
=== Deportivo Italia ===
Savarese made his professional debut at 15, with Venezuelan club Deportivo Italia during the 1986–87 season. He remained with the club through the 1988–89 season, scoring six goals that year.

=== Move to the United States ===
In 1990, Savarese moved to the United States to play college soccer at LIU Brooklyn, while joining the storied amateur club Greek American AA of the Cosmopolitan Soccer League during the long collegiate off-season. He became one of the top scorers in school history with LIU Brooklyn, scoring 50 goals for the Blackbirds in his career.

=== Long Island Rough Riders ===
After college, Savarese signed with the Long Island Rough Riders of the USISL along with future MLS stars Tony Meola and Chris Armas, winning the league championship in 1995, a season in which he was also named league MVP.

=== MetroStars ===
Drafted by the New York/New Jersey MetroStars in the 9th round of the MLS Inaugural Player Draft, Savarese scored the first goal in club history in its inaugural match against the LA Galaxy on 13 April 1996. Savarese proved a prolific scorer during the 1996 season, scoring the next seven goals for the club and cementing his place in the team sheet. He spent three seasons with the MetroStars, setting the long-standing club record for career goals in league play at 41, as well as the club scoring record across all competitions at 44. His record for league goals was broken in 2009 by Juan Pablo Angel. Savarese became a fan favorite, despite coming off the bench for long stretches of time.

=== New England Revolution ===
On January 20, 1999, Savarese was traded to the New England Revolution along with a second-round pick in the 2002 MLS SuperDraft in exchange for Raúl Díaz Arce. He made an immediate impact on his new club, scoring his first goal in the first match of 1999 season, against the Miami Fusion on March 28. Savarese made his home debut on April 10 against DC United, coming on as a 76th minute substitute for Brian Dunseth. In total, he would make 27 appearances for the Revolution in 1999, recording ten goals and two assists, second in scoring only to Joe-Max Moore.

=== Italy ===
Departing MLS to sign for Serie A club Perugia in early 2000, Savarese spent his first stint in Europe loaned to Serie C club Viterbese for half a season, without being recalled to the Italian top division.

=== San Jose Earthquakes ===
Savarese returned to MLS later in 2000 as a mid-season signing for the San Jose Earthquakes, but failed to score in four appearances that season.

=== England ===
His luck improved after returning to Europe with Welsh club Swansea City in the English Second Division, tallying 14 goals across all competitions.

Savarese briefly transferred to Millwall before returning to his native Venezuela and signing for his boyhood club Deportivo Italia, then renamed Deportivo Italchacao.

=== Return to the United States ===
After becoming an assistant coach at St. John's University, Savarese trialed with the MetroStars in 2003, but could not earn a place on the team.

Following a sojourn back to Italy with Sassari Torres, he ended his playing career back in New York with the Rough Riders, then part of the USL Second Division.

== Managerial career ==
=== New York Red Bulls ===
Savarese re-joined the MetroStars organization in 2005 as head of the club's successful youth development program, maintaining his role with through the Red Bull ownership transition before a philosophical conflict with the new management heralded his firing in March 2007.

=== New York Cosmos ===
In August 2010, Savarese joined the New York Cosmos as Cosmos Academy director, with a focus on developing youth talent in New York in preparation for the club's return to professional competition.

The Cosmos announced the promotion of Savarese to head coach on 19 November 2012. He quickly signed Long Island native Carlos Mendes as the modern club's first player in preparation for the team's debut in the North American Soccer League's 2013 Fall season. On 3 August 2013, the Cosmos defeated the Fort Lauderdale Strikers 2–1 in the team's first professional match. During the 2013 season, Savarese led the Cosmos to an undefeated record at home and winners of the Fall season title with an overall record of 31 points from 14 games. The Cosmos would cap the season with an appearance in the Soccer Bowl 2013, where they defeated the Atlanta Silverbacks 1–0.

In 2014, Savarese managed the Cosmos to second place in the 2014 Spring season, finishing behind Minnesota United FC by just one point. The Cosmos also took part in the U.S. Open Cup with Savarese leading the team to a convincing 3–0 fourth-round win over the New York Red Bulls in New York City's first-ever professional soccer derby on 14 June. The Cosmos would fall to eventual runners-up, the Philadelphia Union on 24 June in a 2–1 overtime defeat at PPL Park. After the end of the season, Savarese was offered the chance to interview for the vacant Houston Dynamo head coaching position. He declined, preferring to stay with the Cosmos.

In 2015, Savarese led the Cosmos to an undefeated Spring, earning the title for the first half of the season. The team also defeated New York City FC in the U.S. Open Cup in the first meeting between the two clubs. The Cosmos defeated Ottawa Fury 3–2 in the Soccer Bowl 2015 to win their second league title since returning to professional competition.

The Cosmos were runners-up in the 2016 Spring season, but rallied to claim the Fall title by ten points, and with it the combined season table. Savarese's club defeated Indy Eleven on penalty kicks in the Soccer Bowl 2016, despite scheduling conflicts which forced the club to host the match at Belson Stadium in front of just 2,150 fans. Following the 2016 season, Savarese emerged as a finalist for the head coaching job with MLS expansion club Minnesota United FC. Talks with the new franchise fell apart when the Cosmos insisted on a transfer fee for releasing Savarese from the remainder of his contract, and the position went to Adrian Heath instead.

After the 2016 season ended, the Cosmos nearly folded, terminating all player contracts. Savarese took it upon himself to leverage his network of contacts to find new teams for his former players. When the Cosmos were sold to a new investor, ensuring their survival, Savarese turned to re-signing many of the players who had been let go.

Following the tumultuous off-season, the 2017 season proved the roughest yet for Savarese and the Cosmos as they struggled through the regular season and lost in the opening round of the U.S. Open Cup to National Premier Soccer League club Reading United. Despite draws in 9 of 16 Fall season matches, the Cosmos qualified for the playoff and upset the top-seeded Miami FC away on penalty kicks. The Cosmos season ended in a 2–0 loss to the San Francisco Deltas in the Soccer Bowl 2017.

On December 13, 2017, the Cosmos announced that Savarese would leave the club "to pursue other coaching opportunities".

=== Portland Timbers ===
On December 18, 2017, Savarese was announced as the head coach of the Portland Timbers, the third head coach in their MLS history.

Under Savarese, Portland made the postseason four times in five full seasons, including losses in MLS Cup 2018 and 2021. His five and a half years at the helm in Portland represented the longest coaching tenure for the club in the MLS era. On August 21, 2023, the Timbers announced they had let go of Savarese.

=== Melbourne Victory ===
On June 18, 2026, Savarese was announced as the head coach of Melbourne Victory.

== International career ==
Born in Venezuela, Savarese is of Italian descent. He earned 30 caps for Venezuela, scoring ten goals – including three in FIFA World Cup qualifiers. His most notable goal was against Argentina in 1996.

== Broadcasting ==
Giovanni Savarese worked as a soccer analyst on ESPN broadcasts, starting in 2006 while also running the New York Red Bulls' youth development program. He continued to appear on ESPN through 2017.

In late 2023, he was hired as a commentator on MLS Season Pass, initially to provide Spanish-language analysis during the MLS Cup Playoffs.

== Managerial statistics ==
As of match played 20 August 2023

Managerial record by team and tenure
Team	Nat	From	To	Record							
Team	Nat	From	To	G	W	D	L	GF	GA	GD	Win %
New York Cosmos	(United States)	19 November 2012	13 December 2017	153	74	47	32	251	171	+80	48.37
Portland Timbers	(United States)	18 December 2017	21 August 2023	216	91	53	72	343	313	+30	42.13
Total				369	165	100	104	594	484	+110	44.72

== Honors ==
=== Player ===
Individual

- MLS All-Star: 1996
- National Soccer Hall of Fame: 2007

=== Manager ===
New York Cosmos

- NASL Championships: 2013, 2015, 2016; runner-up: 2017
- NASL Regular Season Titles: 2013 Fall, 2015 Spring, 2016 Fall

Portland Timbers

- MLS Cup Runners-up: 2018, 2021
- Western Conference (Playoff) Champions: 2018, 2021
- MLS is Back Tournament: 2020
