= Ayoze García =

Spanish footballer (born 1985)

Ayoze
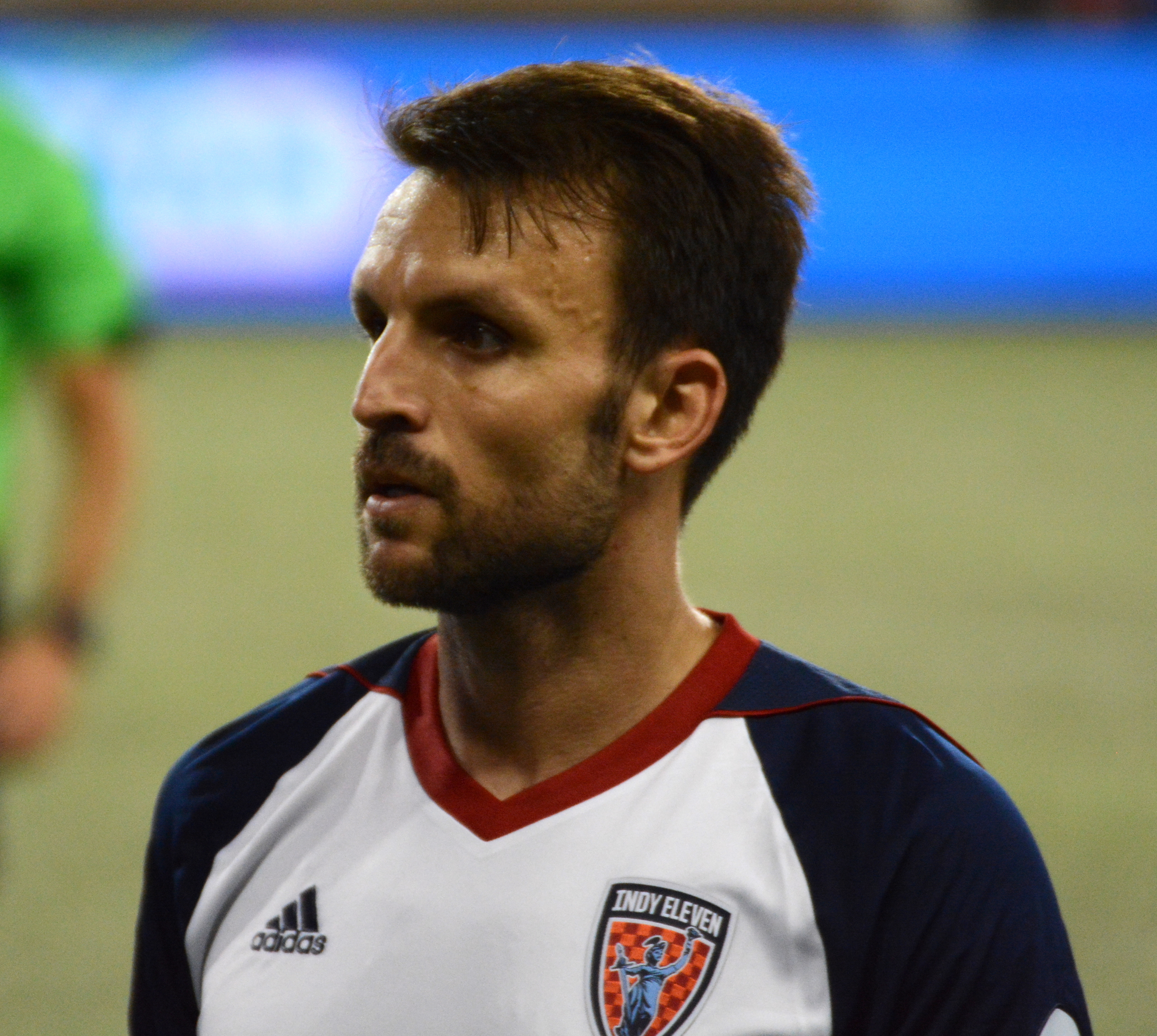
- Ayoze with Indy Eleven in 2018

Personal information
- Full name: Ayoze García Pérez
- Date of birth: 22 November 1985 (age 40)
- Place of birth: Puerto de la Cruz, Spain
- Height: 1.72 m (5 ft 8 in)
- Position: Left-back

Youth career
- CD Esquilón
- Puerto Cruz
- Tenerife

Senior career*
Years	Team	Apps	(Gls)
2002–2004	Tenerife B	50	(8)
2003–2010	Tenerife	162	(19)
2004–2005	→ Las Palmas (loan)	27	(3)
2010–2012	Sporting Gijón	28	(1)
2013–2017	New York Cosmos	121	(8)
2018–2022	Indy Eleven	120	(13)
2024	Atlético Victoria	15	(1)
Total		523	(53)

Managerial career
- 2023–2024: Indy Eleven (assistant)
- * Club domestic league appearances and goals

Ayoze García Pérez (born 22 November 1985), known simply as Ayoze, is a Spanish former professional footballer who played as a left-back.

He spent most of his 20-year career with Tenerife and the New York Cosmos, signing with the latter club in 2013. He retired following a five-year spell in the USL Championship with Indy Eleven.

== Playing career ==
=== Spain ===
Ayoze was born in Puerto de la Cruz, Tenerife. He made his professional debut with CD Tenerife in the Segunda División, then had a loan spell at neighbours UD Las Palmas in 2004–05's Segunda División B; he started his career as a winger.

Upon his return, Ayoze became an essential member of the squad: from 2006 to 2008 he only missed eight league games and scored 14 goals, helping the Canary Islands club to achieve promotion to La Liga in 2009 while acting as one of their captains. In the following season, he was again used regularly (25 appearances, three goals) as the team was immediately relegated; his debut in the Spanish top flight took place on 19 September 2009 as he came on as a 62nd-minute substitute in a 4–0 away loss against RCD Mallorca, and his first goal came on 29 November in the 3–3 draw at Real Valladolid.

In mid-May 2010, after negotiations to renew his link did not produce any results, Ayoze left Tenerife and signed for three years with Sporting de Gijón, which in turn retained their top-division status. He terminated his contract with the Asturians on 31 August 2012 after two seasons of insignificant playing time, the second one ending in relegation.

=== NY Cosmos ===
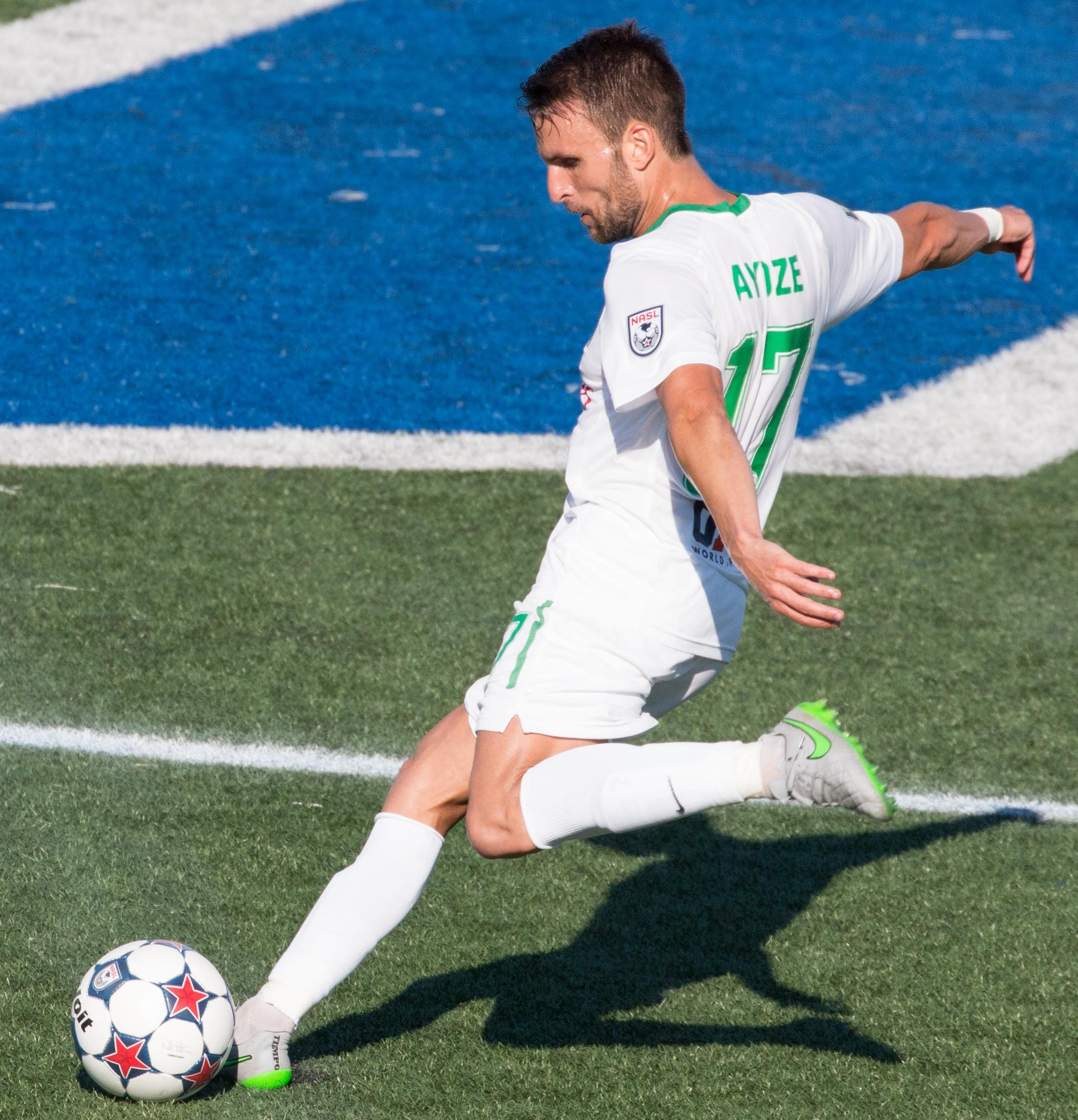
Ayoze in action for the Cosmos in 2015

Aged 27, Ayoze moved abroad for the first time, joining the New York Cosmos of the North American Soccer League. He was an important player in his first year, helping to wins in the Fall Championship and the Soccer Bowl; he tallied one assist, and was part of a defence that ranked first after allowing the fewest goals in the league (12).

On 13 November 2013, Ayoze agreed to an extension. During the 2014 Spring season he scored twice and recorded one assist, once again helping his side to finish as the one with the fewest goals conceded and setting a modern-day NASL shutout streak record of 372 minutes.

Ayoze provided the final pass on Mads Stokkelien's goal that gave the Cosmos a 1–0 lead in an eventual 2–1 defeat against the San Antonio Scorpions on 8 November 2014, in The Championship's semi-finals.

=== Indy Eleven ===
On 6 February 2018, Ayoze signed for United Soccer League club Indy Eleven. He ended his stint at the end of the 2022 campaign aged 37, as leader in games played (126), started (106) and assists (22), being joint-fifth in goals at 13; other than him, only Karl Ouimette and Brad Ring had spent five seasons at the IU Michael A. Carroll Track & Soccer Stadium.

=== Return to football ===
Ayoze came out of retirement in January 2024, with the 38-year-old joining Club Atlético Victoria of Tercera Federación. He scored his only goal on 23 March, in the 1–1 home draw with CD Santa Úrsula.

== Coaching career ==
Immediately after retiring, Ayoze stayed in Indiana by joining Mark Lowry's staff at Indy Eleven. He spent the 2023 season as their assistant coach.

== Honours ==
New York Cosmos

- North American Soccer League: 2013 Fall Championship
- Soccer Bowl 2013
