= Atlanta Silverbacks Park =

Stadium in Georgia, United States

Silverbacks Park

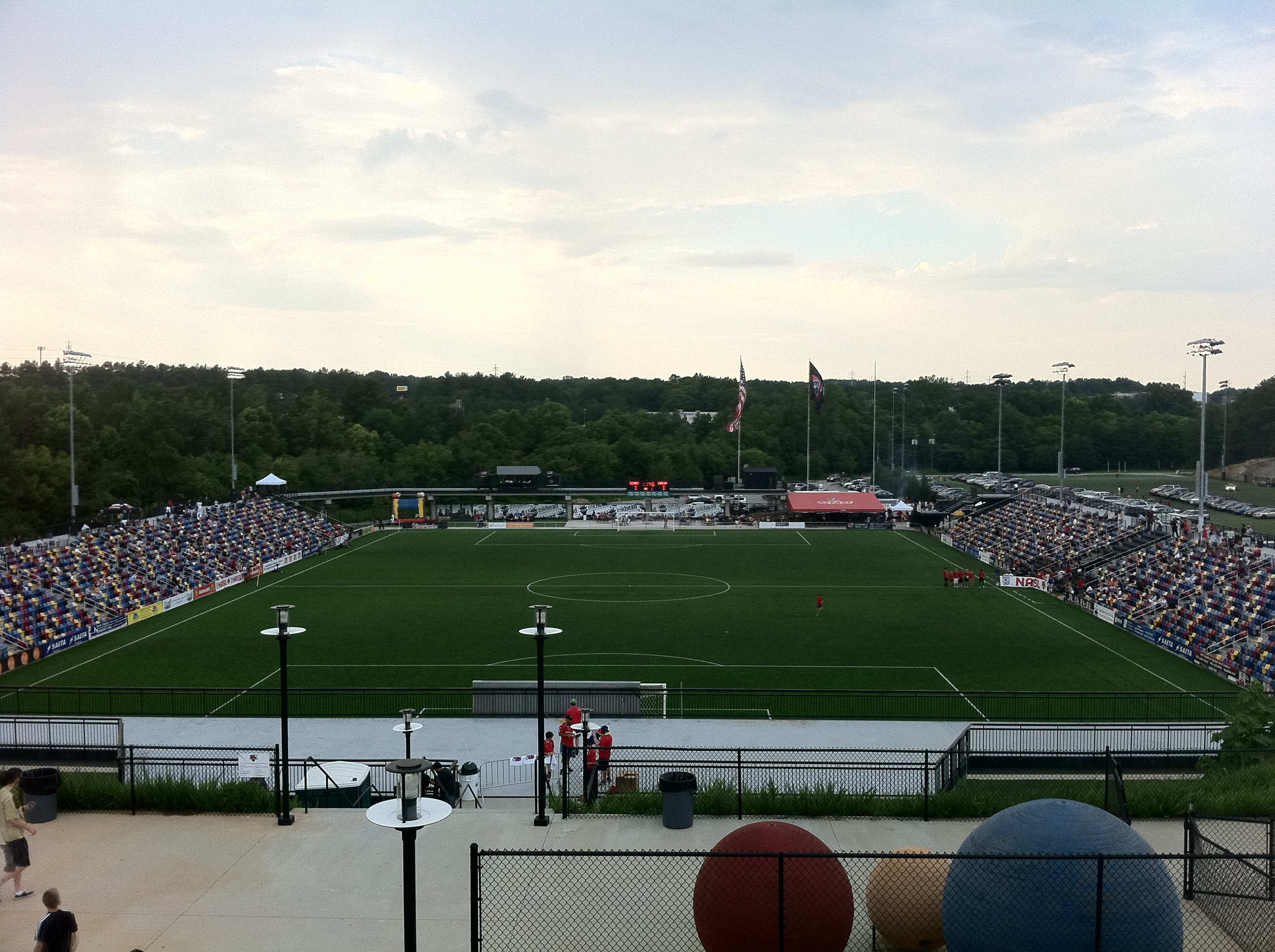
- View from upper level practice field in 2011
- Interactive map of Silverbacks Park
- Former names: RE/MAX Greater Atlanta Stadium; Atlanta Silverbacks Park
- Location: Atlanta Silverbacks Way, Atlanta, GA 30340 USA
- Coordinates: 33°53′29.4″N 84°15′19.08″W
- Owner: Atlanta Silverbacks FC (1994–2015); Investment Group (2016–)
- Capacity: 5,000
- Surface: FieldTurf
- Current use: Rugby; Soccer

Construction
- Opened: 2004 (park); June 3, 2006 (stadium)

Tenant
- List: Apotheos FC (USL2) (2024–present); Atlanta Hustle (AUDL) (2015–present); Atlanta Renegades (USARS) (2011–present); Atlanta Silverbacks (NASL) (2007–2015); Atlanta Silverbacks Women (W-League/WPSL) (2007–2016); Atlanta Silverbacks (NPSL) (2008–2012, 2014–2018); Atlanta Rhinos (NARL) (2014–2019); Atlanta Blaze (MLL) (2019); Rugby ATL (MLR) (2022–2023)

Website
- silverbackspark.com

Atlanta Silverbacks Park is a sports complex in unincorporated DeKalb County, just outside Atlanta, United States that is currently used primarily for rugby. It was formerly the home venue of the Atlanta Silverbacks soccer club, from which the complex gets its name. It also the home of Atlanta Renegades Rugby Club, and was previously used by the Atlanta Rhinos of USA Rugby League and Rugby ATL of Major League Rugby. In 2022 it also became the home stadium for the Atlanta Hustle, a pro ultimate frisbee team that plays in the Ultimate Frisbee Association. The park includes a 5,000-seat soccer-specific stadium, which opened in 2006 and is designed for future expansion.

The venue was the site of Soccer Bowl 2013.

== History ==
The complex was planned and constructed by the owners of the Atlanta Silverbacks soccer club as a home for their various affiliated teams. It was designed to be built in several phases; the first phase commenced in 2004 with the creation of a grass field and two artificial turf fields. In 2006 the 5,000-seat soccer-specific stadium, originally known as the RE/MAX Greater Atlanta Stadium, was built over the grass pitch to serve as the home field for the Silverbacks men's upper-division team and the Atlanta Silverbacks Women.

In 2007, Reggie Bush and David Beckham filmed a commercial for Adidas at the park in which they try to teach each other to play soccer and American football, respectively. Construction continued in 2011 as the fourth international soccer-sized practice field, called "Renegade Field", was opened. The Silverbacks hosted the North American Soccer League Soccer Bowl 2013 on November 9, 2013, drawing 7,211 fans to the match.

== Structure and facilities ==
Silverbacks Park currently features four full-sized soccer fields. The main field is at the stadium, which currently has a capacity of 5,000. The park was designed to be built in four phases, the first three of which are complete. The planned fourth phase is intended to increase the main stadium size to 15,000-20,000 seats and expand the amount of fields and facilities, adding a club house, pool, and fitness center.

== Uses ==
=== Soccer ===
The Atlanta Silverbacks club began using the park as their training facility in 2004. In 2006, the Silverbacks men's first team and the Atlanta Silverbacks Women of the W-League moved their home games to the main field. The men's team played from 2006 to 2008 in the United Soccer Leagues before withdrawing. They returned in 2011 in the North American Soccer League (NASL). The Atlanta Silverbacks Reserves played from 2008-2012, and various youth soccer programs also play at the park.

In 2013, the men's team won the NASL Spring Championship, earning them the right to host Soccer Bowl 2013 on November 9. The Silverbacks lost 1-0 to the Fall Championship winners, the New York Cosmos.

In 2015, the NASL took over operations of the men's Silverbacks. On January 11, 2016, the club folded after the NASL announced that they were unable to find suitable local ownership for the team. The women's team ceased to play with the W-League when it folded after the 2015 season, suspending operations after playing 2016 with the WPSL. The reserve team continued to play in the NPSL through the 2018 season, licensing the "Silverbacks" name from the owners of Silverbacks Park. In January 2019, the club announced that the agreement had been dissolved, and they would no longer use the name or play at Silverbacks Park.

Semi-professional soccer returned to Atlanta Silverbacks Park in 2024 as Apotheos FC moved from its previous home field at North Cobb Christian School.

=== Rugby ===
The Atlanta Rhinos Rugby league team of the NARL play their home fixtures at the Atlanta Silverbacks Park.

The Atlanta Renegades Rugby Football Club, a Rugby Union team, of USA Rugby are in partnership with the Atlanta Silverbacks. They use the complex for all their training and home games. The team mainly play at "Renegade Field.".

Rugby ATL of Major League Rugby played their 2022 and 2023 home fixtures at the park but moved to Los Angeles before the 2024 season.

=== Lacrosse ===
On July 28, 2019, Atlanta's Major League Lacrosse team, the Blaze, announced they would be moving to Silverbacks Park in the middle of their season. This was due to their previous stadium, Grady Stadium in Midtown Atlanta, undergoing maintenance.

== Geography ==
The stadium and park is located off Northcrest Road between Interstate 85 and Chamblee-Tucker Road. The official address is Atlanta Silverbacks Way, Atlanta, GA 30340, although some maps use the former name of Northcrest Way.

== See also ==
- List of rugby league stadiums by capacity
