= Alessandro Noselli =

Italian footballer (born 1980)

Personal information
- Date of birth: 1 September 1980 (age 46)
- Place of birth: Udine, Italy
- Height: 1.77 m (5 ft 10 in)
- Position: Striker

Youth career
- Udinese

Senior career*
Years	Team	Apps	(Gls)
2000–2001	Castel di Sangro	24	(4)
2001	Avellino	0	(0)
2001–2004	South Tyrol	52	(26)
2003–2004	→ Triestina (loan)	17	(1)
2004–2008	Mantova	116	(18)
2008–2012	Sassuolo	99	(38)
2013–2014	New York Cosmos	15	(4)
2014–2019	Sasso Marconi	47	(15)
Total		370	(106)

International career
1996	Italy U15	6	(0)
1996–1997	Italy U16	5	(0)
- * Club domestic league appearances and goals

Alessandro Noselli (born 1 September 1980) is an Italian former footballer who plays as a striker.

== Club career ==
=== Early career ===
Born in Udine, Friuli, Noselli started his career at hometown club Udinese Calcio. Noselli graduated from the Primavera under-20 reserve team in 2000. That transfer window he left for Castel di Sangro of Serie C1. In mid-2001 he left for Avellino, but Noselli failed to play any games.

=== South Tyrol ===
In October 2001 Noselli went down to Serie C2 club South Tyrol. Noselli scored a double figure of 10 goals, the first time in his career. In Bolzano, he partnered with another Udine youth product Simone Motta. Udinese turned the deal to co-ownership on 30 August 2002. On that day Udinese bought back Noselli from South Tyrol and re-sold him to South Tyrol, and made South Tyrol the "active" stakeholder and Udinese the "passive" one.

=== Triestina ===
In June 2003 the co-ownership deal was renewed, and Udinese farmed Noselli to Serie B club Triestina in July 2003. The club was located in Trieste, the capital of Friuli-Venezia Giulia, where city of Udine is also located. Noselli picked no.32 as shirt number. However Noselli failed to enter the starting XI and scored once. Both South Tyrol and Udinese failed to agree on a price before the deadline on 23 June, thus they had to submit a bid to Lega Calcio in a sealed envelope. On the next day the league committee announced that South Tyrol outbid Udinese. However the tiny Serie C2 club sold Noselli to Mantova, the champion of Serie C2 Group A.

=== Mantova ===
Noselli joined Mantova in mid-2004. Noselli had yet to score regularly since leaving the fourth division. In 2004–05 Serie C1, Noselli only scored once. Mantua was promoted as the promotion playoffs winner. However Noselli, scored 8 goals in 2005–06 Serie B, with only 18 starts. Noselli spent almost half his appearances as substitute and as starter. Noselli also started in 3 out of 4 games of the promotion playoffs, losing to Torino. Noselli became more important in the next season, with 28 starts and 7 goals. However, in the last season in 2007–08 Serie B, Noselli made 11 starts in 22 appearances. He also only scored twice. Noselli wore the no.32 shirt in his 3 seasons in second division.

=== Sassuolo ===
Noselli joined second division newcomer Sassuolo in August 2008 for an undisclosed fee, wearing no.18. Noselli also re-joined former team-mate Nicola Donazzan. Noselli scored an impressive 16 Serie B goals, his career high. His attacking partners, Riccardo Zampagna, Gaetano Masucci, and Horacio Erpen, scored 11 goals, 4 goals and 3 goals respectively. Noselli also made Sanmarinese international Andy Selva his backup.

Coach Stefano Pioli used either 4–3–3 formation or 4–3–1–2 formation in 2009–10 Serie B. Noselli was the team top-scorer again with 18 goals. In the playoffs Noselli lost to Torino again. Coach used Quadrini – Martinetti – Noselli (Zampagna) in the formation against Turin.

Noselli lost his starting place in 2010–11 Serie B. Neither Masucci nor Noselli was the favourite of the coach. Noselli only made 14 starts in the half-season. Daniele Arrigoni (and later Angelo Gregucci) used Martinetti and Quadrini as the starting forwards, plus Masucci and Noselli competed in the last place. In January 2011 Masucci left the club and Noselli did not play any more games for the club, (due to injury), instead Salvatore Bruno entered the starting XI. Under care-taker Paolo Mandelli, the coach used 4–4–2 formation, with Andrea Catellani as right winger.

Noselli did not enter the starting XI either under new coach Fulvio Pea. Pea used 3–5–2 formation. Noselli was also injured in November.

=== New York Cosmos ===
Noselli signed with NASL club New York Cosmos on 17 July 2013.

== International career ==
Noselli represented Italy internationally at the youth level. He was capped for the Italy U-16 team in friendlies to prepare for the team's 1997 UEFA European Under-16 Football Championship qualification campaign. However Noselli failed to play in the qualifier.

== Honours ==
=== Club ===
New York Cosmos

- NASL 2013 Fall Champions
- NASL Soccer Bowl 2013
