= Marcos Senna =

Spanish football player (born 1976)

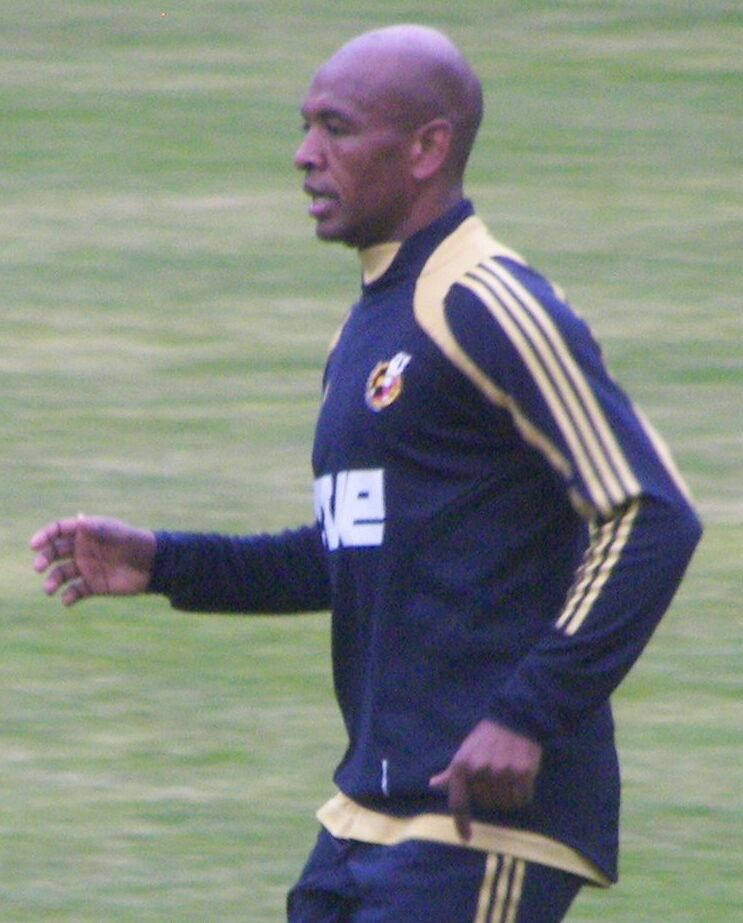
- Senna training with Spain at Euro 2008

Personal information
- Full name: Marcos Antônio Senna da Silva
- Date of birth: 17 July 1976 (age 50)
- Place of birth: São Paulo, Brazil
- Height: 1.77 m (5 ft 10 in)
- Position: Midfielder

Youth career
- 1994–1997: Rio Branco-SP

Senior career*
Years	Team	Apps	(Gls)
1997–1999	Rio Branco-SP	39	(12)
1998	→ América-SP (loan)	4	(0)
1999–2001	Corinthians	43	(1)
2001	Juventude	14	(1)
2002	São Caetano	0	(0)
2002–2013	Villarreal	292	(25)
2013–2015	New York Cosmos	55	(13)
Total		443	(51)

International career
2006–2010	Spain	28	(1)
Medal record
Representing Spain
UEFA European Championship
Winner	2008 Austria-Switzerland
- * Club domestic league appearances and goals

Marcos Antônio Senna da Silva (born 17 July 1976), known as Marcos Senna, is a former professional footballer who played as a defensive midfielder. He was known for his passing range and long-range shooting and was also a penalty specialist.

He spent most of his professional career in Spain with Villarreal, appearing in 363 official matches during 11 seasons, 10 of which were in La Liga (33 goals scored). He ended his career with the New York Cosmos, with whom he twice won the Soccer Bowl.

Born in Brazil, Senna represented the Spain national team during a four-year spell, appearing at the 2006 World Cup and Euro 2008, and winning the latter tournament as starter.

== Club career ==
=== Villarreal ===
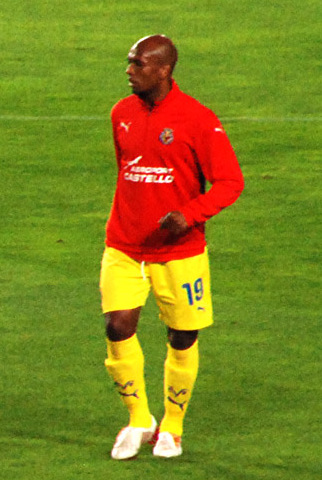
Senna warming up with Villarreal in 2008

Born in São Paulo, Senna began his career with Rio Branco Esporte Clube. After playing for a number of Brazilian clubs early in his career, including being club World Cup champion in 2000 with Corinthians and Copa Libertadores 2002 runner-up with São Caetano, he moved to Spanish side Villarreal CF in 2002, from Associação Desportiva São Caetano. He only made 25 La Liga appearances in his first two seasons combined, however this was mainly due to a serious knee injury he picked up in August 2003. However, after recovering from his injury he became an undisputed starter, helping the club reach as far as the UEFA Champions League semi-finals in 2005–06; eventually, he also gained the club captaincy.

In the summer of 2006, Senna almost joined Manchester United: he had one year left on his contract, and Villarreal were prepared to sell him for a fee of around £4 million. However, the deal was put on hold while United pursued Owen Hargreaves, but FC Bayern Munich refused to sell their player and, when United returned with a bid for Senna on transfer deadline day, Villarreal rejected their advances; he had become frustrated with the delays to his proposed move and decided to stay at Villarreal, signing a three-year extension shortly after the transfer window closed.

On 27 April 2008, Senna scored a goal from inside the centre circle against Real Betis that he deemed "the best goal of my life". That season, as the player netted a further three times in a total of 33 matches, Villarreal finished a club-best second, to champions Real Madrid.

After nearly two seasons marred with physical problems, 35-year-old Senna returned to full fitness for 2011–12, as the Valencian Community side's playmaker. On 21 March 2012, he scored from a free kick for the 83rd-minute home equaliser against Real Madrid (1–1), but his team would be eventually relegated after a twelve-year stay in the top level.

=== New York Cosmos ===
On 13 June 2013, after helping Villarreal return to the top flight, Senna signed with newly formed North American Soccer League club New York Cosmos for an undisclosed fee. He made his debut in the team's inaugural match on 3 August, a 2–1 win over the Fort Lauderdale Strikers, and scored his first goal on 1 September in a 1–1 draw at FC Edmonton. In his first year with the team he was named the league's player of the week on two occasions, and also helped to wins in the NASL Fall Championship and the Soccer Bowl, scoring the game-winner in the final championship match against the Atlanta Silverbacks.

On 13 November 2013, Senna was awarded a testimonial match by Villarreal, featuring in a 3–0 win over the Cosmos: he started the game and set up Jérémy Perbet for the first goal. In his honour, the crowd broke out in a full minute of applause that started in the 19th minute (the jersey he wore), and he played the second half with the North American before leaving the pitch with 20 minutes to go to another standing ovation.

Senna netted his first goal of the season on 12 May 2014, scoring the game-winner in a 1–0 home win over the Spring season champions Minnesota United FC, who were handed their only loss in the competition. His second came on 9 August, as he connected on a spectacular second half free kick to help the Cosmos come from behind to win it 2–1 at the Silverbacks; he helped the club to the third position in the combined standings as well as a berth in The Championship, being nominated to the NASL Team of the Week four times, second best in the squad.

On 10 June 2015, one month shy of his 39th birthday, Senna announced he would retire as a player at the end of the Fall season. His final game was the Soccer Bowl on 15 November, which his team won 3–2 against Ottawa Fury FC, also the swansong of his national teammate Raúl.

== International career ==
Senna was granted Spanish citizenship in early 2006 and was part of the Spanish squad for the 2006 FIFA World Cup and UEFA Euro 2008. His debut came on 1 March in a friendly match with Ivory Coast, played in Valladolid.

In the quarter-finals of the latter competition, Senna scored the third of Spain's four converted penalties, which resulted in the nation progressing to the semifinals at the expense of Italy, winning 4–2 in the shootout. He played the full duration of the final – a 1–0 win over Germany – and was named in UEFA's squad for the competition. Some pundits and journalists also named Senna as their player of the tournament.

Senna's first international goal came against Armenia on 10 September 2008, a 4–0 win in the 2010 World Cup qualifying campaign. On 20 May 2010, after an irregular season with Villarreal, with several physical problems, the 33-year-old was left out of Spain's final 23-man squad, with FC Barcelona's Sergio Busquets starting in his place as the national team went on to win the FIFA World Cup in South Africa.

== Style of play ==
Senna usually played either as a central or defensive midfielder, functioning both as a ball-winner and in a more creative role of deep-lying playmaker. As such, his role has also been likened to that of a metodista ("centre-half" in Italian football jargon) in the Italian press, due to his ability to dictate play and assist his team defensively. In 2008, Glenn Moore of The Belfast Telegraph noted that Senna was known for his "passing, disciplined positioning, tackling and long-range shooting", praising the midfielder for his "genial personality and commanding performances." Senna was also a free kick and penalty specialist. Pundits and Senna's international teammates observed that he provided "balance" to Spain's midfield at Euro 2008, by doing the "dirty work", namely helping his team to win back the ball and control possession of the midfield through his work-rate, passing, and ability to occupy space, despite his diminutive stature and lack of physicality; his qualities complemented Spain's tiki-taka passing-based playing style under manager Luis Aragonés. Regarding his playing style, Senna commented in 2008: "My style is simple and objective. I don't like when players try to do easy things in a complicated way. The others help me in my role, but the important factor is that there is a lot of quality in our team and the opponents are worried about all our midfielders. There is more space left for me and, as I am a good passer too, that becomes important for the team." In addition to his ability as a player, Senna's former New York Cosmos coach Giovanni Savarese praised him for his leadership in 2015.

== Personal life ==
Senna's younger brother, Márcio, was also a footballer. Marcos Assunção, who represented A.S. Roma and Betis amongst other clubs, is his cousin, and both were also midfielders.

Senna is a Christian, and he spoke about his faith in the documentary "The Prize: Chasing the Dream", along with Kaká. He is also a member of the International Christian ministry Athletes in Action.

Along with Raúl Albiol and Guillermo Franco, in 2008 Senna founded Evangélico FC, an organisation consisting of 140 athletes and 16 coaches which sought to promote Christian values among young athletes in Spain.

== Career statistics ==
=== Club ===
Appearances and goals by club, season and competition
Club	Season	League			Cup (Note: Includes Copa do Brasil and Copa del Rey)		Continental (Note: Includes Copa Mercosur, Copa Libertadores, UEFA Intertoto Cup, UEFA Cup, UEFA Champions League and UEFA Europa League)		State League (Note: Includes Campeonato Paulista)		Other (Note: Includes Intercontinental Cup, Torneio Rio – São Paulo and Copa dos Campeões)		Total	
Club	Season	Division	Apps	Goals	Apps	Goals	Apps	Goals	Apps	Goals	Apps	Goals	Apps	Goals
Rio Branco-SP	1997	Paulista	—		—		—		8	0	—		8	0
Rio Branco-SP	1998	Paulista	—		—		—		11	0	—		11	0
Rio Branco-SP	1999	Paulista	—		—		—		20	12	—		20	12
Rio Branco-SP	Total		—		—		—		39	12	—		39	12
América-SP (loan)	1998	Série C	4	0	—		—		—		—		4	0
Corinthians	1999	Série A	16	0	—		3	0	—		—		19	0
Corinthians	2000	Série A	0	0	1	0	5	0	12	1	8	0	26	1
Corinthians	2001	Série A	0	0	10	0	—		15	0	3	0	28	0
Corinthians	Total		16	0	11	0	8	0	27	1	11	0	73	1
Juventude	2001	Série A	14	1	—		—		—		—		14	1
São Caetano	2002	Série A	0	0	—		13	0	—		12	1	25	1
Villarreal	2002–03	La Liga	16	2	0	0	—		—		—		16	2
Villarreal	2003–04	La Liga	9	0	0	0	1	0	—		—		10	0
Villarreal	2004–05	La Liga	29	2	0	0	10	0	—		—		39	2
Villarreal	2005–06	La Liga	30	3	0	0	13	1	—		—		43	4
Villarreal	2006–07	La Liga	33	0	2	0	1	0	—		—		36	0
Villarreal	2007–08	La Liga	34	4	5	1	4	1	—		—		43	6
Villarreal	2008–09	La Liga	27	2	0	0	8	2	—		—		35	4
Villarreal	2009–10	La Liga	30	1	3	0	7	3	—		—		40	4
Villarreal	2010–11	La Liga	20	1	1	0	6	0	—		—		27	1
Villarreal	2011–12	La Liga	31	5	1	0	6	0	—		—		38	5
Villarreal	2012–13	Segunda División	33	5	0	0	—		—		—		33	5
Villarreal	Total		292	25	12	1	56	7	—		—		360	33
New York Cosmos	2013	North American Soccer League	13	5	1	1	—		—		—		14	6
New York Cosmos	2014	North American Soccer League	20	4	1	0	—		—		—		21	4
New York Cosmos	2015	North American Soccer League	18	3	3	0	—		—		—		21	3
New York Cosmos	Total		51	12	5	1	—		—		—		56	13
Career total			377	38	28	2	77	7	66	13	23	1	571	61

=== International ===
Scores and results list Spain's goal tally first, score column indicates score after each Senna goal.

List of international goals scored by Marcos Senna
No.	Date	Venue	Opponent	Score	Result	Competition
1	10 September 2008	Carlos Belmonte, Albacete, Spain	Armenia	4–0	4–0	2010 FIFA World Cup qualification

== Honours ==
São Caetano

- Copa Libertadores runner-up: 2002

Corinthians

- Campeonato Brasileiro Série A: 1999
- Campeonato Paulista: 1999, 2001
- FIFA Club World Cup: 2000

Villarreal

- UEFA Intertoto Cup: 2003, 2004

New York Cosmos

- North American Soccer League: 2013 Fall Championship, 2015 Spring Championship
- Soccer Bowl: 2013, 2015
- North American Supporters' Trophy: 2015

Spain

- UEFA European Championship: 2008

Individual

- UEFA European Championship: Team of the tournament 2008
- Don Balón Award – Spanish Player of the Year: 2008
- La Liga Fair Play Award: 2009–10

== See also ==
- List of Spain international footballers born outside Spain
