= Carlos Mendes (soccer) =

American soccer player (born 1980)

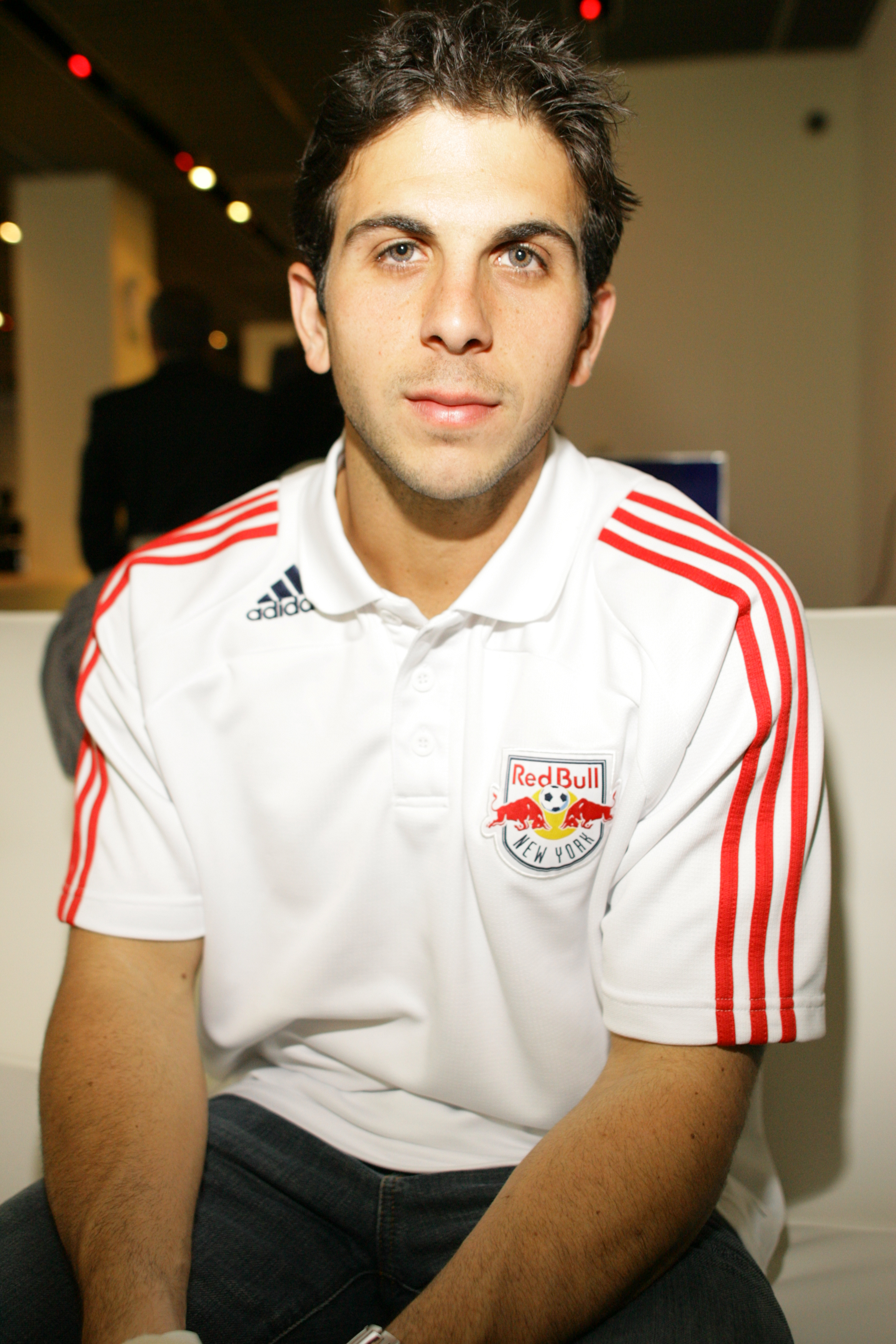
- Carlos Mendes as a player for Red Bull New York

Personal information
- Date of birth: December 25, 1980 (age 45)
- Place of birth: Mineola, New York, U.S.
- Height: 5 ft 10 in (1.78 m)
- Position: Defender

Team information
- Current team: Merchant Marine Mariners (head coach)

Youth career
- 1993–1998: Mineola Portuguese SC

College career
| Years | Team | Apps | (Gls) |
| 1998–2001 | Old Dominion Monarchs | | |

Senior career*
| Years | Team | Apps | (Gls) |
| 2002 | Long Island Rough Riders | 10 | (0) |
| 2003–2004 | Rochester Raging Rhinos | 37 | (1) |
| 2005–2011 | New York Red Bulls | 146 | (0) |
| 2012 | Columbus Crew | 12 | (0) |
| 2013–2017 | New York Cosmos | 111 | (5) |

Managerial career
- 2018–2019: New York Cosmos B
- 2020: New York Cosmos
- 2021–: Merchant Marine Mariners (women)
- * Club domestic league appearances and goals as of 24 July 2022

Carlos Mendes (born December 25, 1980) is an American soccer manager and former player who is head coach of the Merchant Marine Mariners women's team.

== Early life and career ==
Mendes grew up in Mineola, New York and attended The Wheatley School. He was voted a high school All-American his senior year. In addition to being an All-State and All-Region honoree, he was voted twice All-County (Nassau). As a student athlete at Old Dominion University Mendes was a three-time First Team All Colonial Athletic Association (CAA) selection in 1999, 2000 and 2001. Mendes was the 1998 CAA Rookie of the Year, and a two-time NSCAA United Soccer Coaches Association All-Region selection.

== Playing career ==
=== Long Island Rough Riders ===
Mendes started his career with the Long Island Rough Riders of the United Soccer League (USL) in 2002. While playing for them in 2002 he became a defender, winning the D3 Pro League title while scoring the equalizer in the Championship Game against the Wilmington Hammerheads in North Carolina.

=== Rochester Raging Rhinos ===
Mendes moved up a division to play for Rochester Raging Rhinos of the A-League, where he became a consistent starter for the next two seasons.

=== New York Red Bulls ===
Mendes signed with the MetroStars of Major League Soccer (MLS) before the start of the 2005 season, and became the starter in central defense, filling the position formerly held by Eddie Pope. During the 2006 MLS campaign Mendes started every game on the season but one, which was due to caution point accumulation. For his efforts, he was voted team Defender of the Year by members of the soccer media.

Mendes continued his solid play anchoring the clubs backline during the early part of the 2007 season with the New York Red Bulls. However, he fell out of favor with coach Bruce Arena and was in and out of the lineup during the latter part of the season. He concluded the campaign appearing in 23 matches (19 starts), his lowest totals since joining the club. For the 2008 season Mendes was converted into a defensive midfielder and appeared in 17 regular season matches. He returned to central defense in the MLS playoffs starting in the club's 1–0 victory over Real Salt Lake, helping the club reach its first ever MLS Cup final. 2009 was an injury plagued regular season for Mendes as he was limited to 12 league appearances. Mendes began the 2010 season recuperating from his injury problems, once fully fit he replaced Mike Petke as Hans Backe's first choice center back pairing with first year player Tim Ream. On October 21, 2010, Mendes helped Red Bulls record its 13th clean sheet of the season in a 2–0 victory over New England Revolution which clinched the regular season Eastern Conference title.

On March 26, 2011, Mendes became the sixth New York player to hit 10,000 MLS minutes played for the club. By season's end he had moved into second place on the all-time franchise list in games played, games started, and minutes played.

=== Columbus Crew ===
On November 30, 2011, the Red Bulls declined the 2012 option on Mendes's contract, making him eligible for the 2011 MLS Re-Entry Draft. On December 5, 2011, Mendes was selected by Columbus Crew in stage 1 of the MLS Re-Entry Draft. The Crew immediately picked up his option.

=== New York Cosmos ===
On December 11, 2012, Mendes signed on to play for the New York Cosmos in the team's inaugural year in the North American Soccer League (NASL), becoming the first professional player signed to the club. In his first year with the team he was named team captain, played and started in 14 games and also helped the club to wins in the NASL Fall season and the Soccer Bowl 2013. Mendes anchored a defensive line that allowed just 12 goals on the season - the lowest total in the 2013 NASL Fall season and his contributions earned him a spot on the NASL Team of the Week three times across the season.

On April 13, 2014, Mendes scored the first two goals of his professional career in a 4–0 victory over the Atlanta Silverbacks, earning him NASL Player of the Week honors. During the 2014 NASL Spring season, Mendes led a defense that allowed an NASL-low three goals and set the modern day NASL shutout streak, going 372 minutes without conceding a goal.

Mendes finished the 2014 season with two goals and one assist in 25 starts and 25 appearances. He was named to the NASL Team of the Week a team-high five times and was one of two Cosmos players recognized in the NASL Best XI at the conclusion of the season.

In 2015, Mendes started 28 out of 30 NASL regular season matches, logging 2,498 minutes, high enough for second-most on the Cosmos. On Mother's Day (May 10) vs. FC Edmonton, Mendes scored two goals in a 4–2 Cosmos victory. Mendes was named to the NASL's Best XI of 2015.

Mendes was inducted into the Long Island Soccer Football League's inaugural hall of fame class on November 22, 2015.

== Coaching career ==
Following his playing days, Mendes went into coaching as an assistant with the LIU Post Pioneers.

In 2018, he re-joined the Cosmos as head coach of the Cosmos B team in the National Premier Soccer League (NPSL). In 2020, he moved up to became head coach of the first team. The Cosmos went on hiatus in January 2021.

Mendes spent one season an assistant coach for the Queens Knights before joining the staff of the U.S. Merchant Marine Academy as the head coach of the Mariners' women's soccer program in November 2021.

== Career statistics ==
As of December 6, 2019

| Club | Season | League | | | Cup | | League Cup | | Continental | | Total | |
| Club | Season | Division | Apps | Goals | Apps | Goals | Apps | Goals | Apps | Goals | Apps | Goals |
|---|---|---|---|---|---|---|---|---|---|---|---|---|
| Long Island Rough Riders | 2002 | USL-2 | 10 | 0 | - | - | - | - | — | | - | - |
| Rochester Rhinos | 2003 | USL-1 | | | | | | | | | | |
| Rochester Rhinos | 2004 | USL-1 | | | | | | | | | | |
| New York MetroStars | 2005 | MLS | 24 | 0 | 1 | 0 | 2 | 0 | — | | 27 | 0 |
| New York Red Bulls | 2006 | MLS | 31 | 0 | 2 | 0 | 2 | 0 | — | | 35 | 0 |
| New York Red Bulls | 2007 | MLS | 23 | 0 | 1 | 0 | 0 | 0 | — | | 24 | 0 |
| New York Red Bulls | 2008 | MLS | 17 | 0 | 1 | 0 | 3 | 0 | — | | 21 | 0 |
| New York Red Bulls | 2009 | MLS | 12 | 0 | 1 | 0 | 0 | 0 | — | | 13 | 0 |
| New York Red Bulls | 2010 | MLS | 21 | 0 | 3 | 0 | 2 | 0 | — | | 26 | 0 |
| New York Red Bulls | 2011 | MLS | 18 | 0 | 0 | 0 | 2 | 0 | — | | 20 | 0 |
| Columbus Crew | 2012 | MLS | 12 | 0 | - | - | - | - | — | | 12 | 0 |
| New York Cosmos | 2013 | NASL | 13 | 0 | 0 | 0 | 1 | 0 | — | | 14 | 0 |
| New York Cosmos | 2014 | NASL | 25 | 2 | 3 | 0 | 1 | 0 | — | | 29 | 2 |
| New York Cosmos | 2015 | NASL | 28 | 2 | 2 | 0 | 2 | 0 | — | | 32 | 2 |
| New York Cosmos | 2016 | NASL | 27 | 0 | 3 | 0 | 2 | 0 | — | | 32 | 0 |
| New York Cosmos | 2017 | NASL | 18 | 1 | 1 | 0 | 2 | 0 | — | | 21 | 1 |
| Career total | | | 279 | 5 | 18 | 0 | 19 | 0 | — | | 306 | 5 |

== Honors ==
| Team | League | Honor | Champion | Runner-up |
|---|---|---|---|---|
| Long Island Rough Riders | USL Second Division | USL-2 Regular Season | 2002 | |
| Long Island Rough Riders | USL Second Division | USL-2 Playoffs | 2002 | |
| New York Red Bulls | Major League Soccer | MLS Cup | | 2008 |
| New York Red Bulls | Major League Soccer | MLS Eastern Conference Regular Season | 2010 | |
| New York Red Bulls | Major League Soccer | MLS Western Conference play-offs | 2008 | |
| New York Red Bulls | Major League Soccer | Emirates Cup | 2011 | |
| New York Cosmos | North American Soccer League | Soccer Bowl | 2013, 2015, 2016 | 2017 |
| New York Cosmos | North American Soccer League | North American Supporters' Trophy | 2015, 2016 | |
| New York Cosmos | North American Soccer League | Spring championship | 2015 | 2014, 2016 |
| New York Cosmos | North American Soccer League | Fall championship | 2013, 2016 | |
| New York Cosmos | North American Soccer League | NASL Best XI | 2014, 2015, 2016 | |
