= Kyle Reynish =

American soccer player

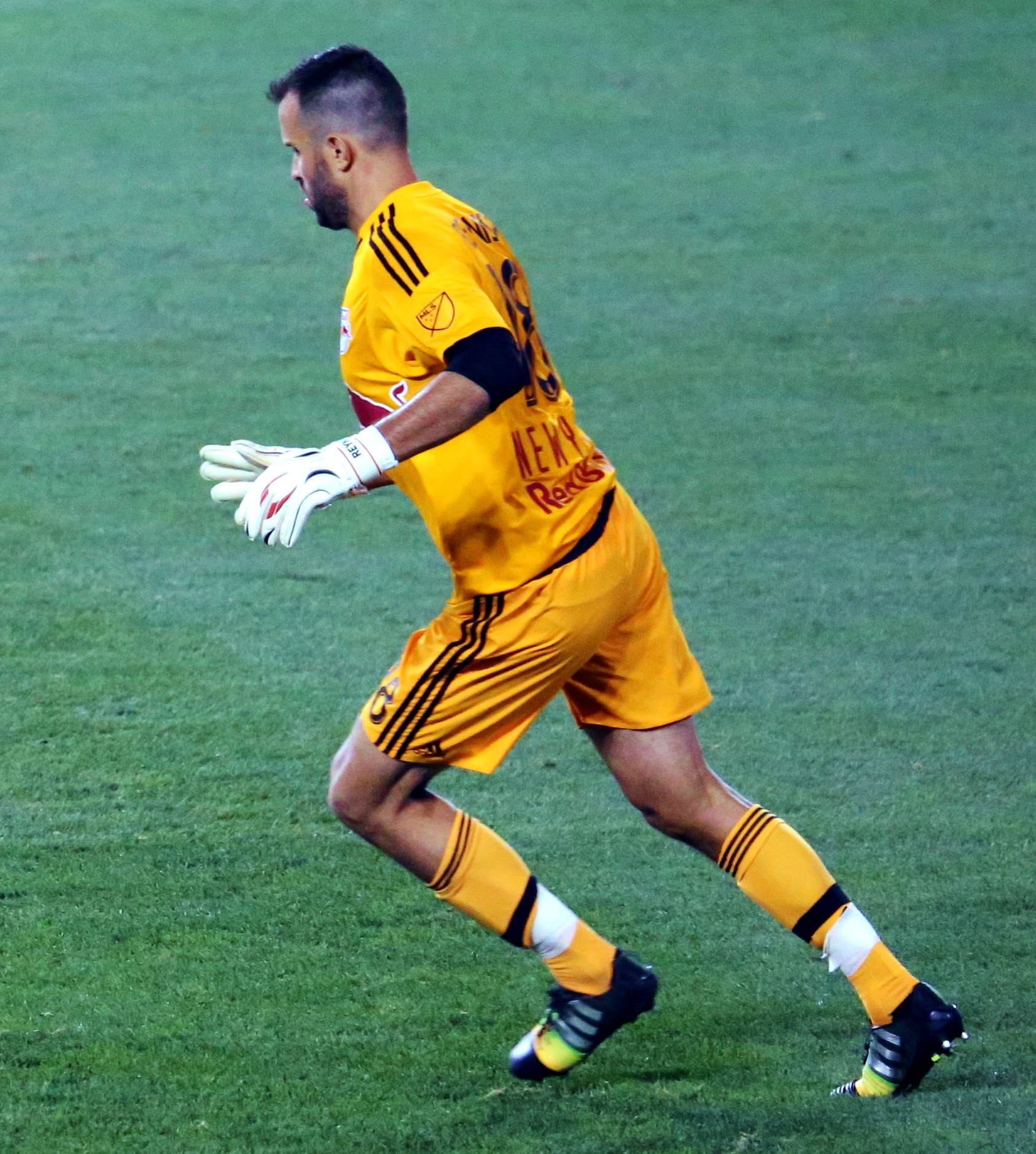

Personal information
- Full name: Kyle Patrick Reynish
- Date of birth: November 3, 1983 (age 42)
- Place of birth: Valencia, Santa Clarita, California, United States
- Height: 6 ft 3 in (1.91 m)
- Position: Goalkeeper

Youth career
- 1998–2001: Hart High School

College career
Years	Team	Apps	(Gls)
2002–2006	UC Santa Barbara Gauchos		

Senior career*
Years	Team	Apps	(Gls)
2006	Bakersfield Brigade	9	(0)
2007–2012	Real Salt Lake	8	(0)
2010	→ Charleston Battery (loan)	3	(0)
2013	New York Cosmos	12	(0)
2014	Chicago Fire	1	(0)
2015–2016	New York Red Bulls	0	(0)
2015	→ New York Red Bulls II (loan)	3	(0)
2016	→ New York Red Bulls II (loan)	5	(0)
2017	Atlanta United	2	(0)
2018	Fresno FC	27	(0)
- * Club domestic league appearances and goals

Kyle Patrick Reynish (born November 3, 1983) is an American former professional soccer player who played as a goalkeeper.

== Early life and education ==
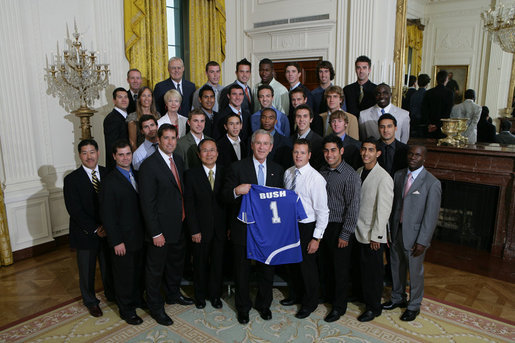
Reynish and the 2006 UCSB Gauchos soccer team honored at the White House.

Reynish attended Hart High School in Santa Clarita, California where he had a 0.84 career goals against average, as well as setting the school's single-season (14) and career (38) shutout records. He played college soccer for the University of California Santa Barbara from 2002 to 2006, sitting out between his freshman and sophomore seasons as a redshirt in the 2003 season. He was the starting goalkeeper and played every minute for UCSB in their 2006 season, in which the school won its first NCAA Division I National Championship. Reynish was 1st Team All-Big West his senior year.

== Playing career ==
During his college years, Reynish also played with Bakersfield Brigade in the USL Premier Development League.

Reynish was selected in the fourth round, 43rd overall, of the 2007 MLS Supplemental Draft by Real Salt Lake on January 18, 2007. Reynish played for RSL in friendlies against the Fiji national football team, the China national football team, and English side Everton, as well as in the MLS Reserve Division, but did not make his senior debut until May 2, 2009, when he came on as a substitute for an injured Nick Rimando in a game against Colorado Rapids, two years and four months after being signed.

During 2010 Reynish was loaned to USL Second Division side Charleston Battery, and played three games for them during their USL2 Championship-winning season. Reynish was released by Salt Lake on December 3, 2012. He entered the 2012 MLS Re-Entry Draft and became a free agent after going undrafted in both rounds of the draft. Reynish signed with North American Soccer League side New York Cosmos for the fall season. He helped the club capture the 2013 Fall Championship and Soccer Bowl 2013 titles. He was named the best goalkeeper for the 2013 season, winning the NASL Golden Glove award.

Reynish re-joined Major League Soccer in January 2014 when he signed with Chicago Fire. He made one regular season start for Chicago during the 2014 season.

On January 20, 2015, Reynish was traded to New York Red Bulls for a 2016 MLS SuperDraft pick. Reynish was loaned to affiliate side New York Red Bulls II and made his debut as a starter for the side on April 4, 2015, helping the club to its first victory, a 4–1 result over Toronto FC II.

Reynish was traded by New York to expansion side Atlanta United FC in exchange for a fourth-round pick in the 2018 MLS SuperDraft on March 1, 2017.

Reynish signed with USL side Fresno FC on March 12, 2018, for the 2018 season.

Reynish announced his retirement from playing professional soccer at the end of the 2018 USL season.

== Awards and honors ==
=== Club ===
UC Santa Barbara

- NCAA Division I Men's Soccer Championship (1): 2006

New York Cosmos

- North American Soccer League (1): 2013 Fall Championship
- NASL Soccer Bowl (1): 2013

New York Red Bulls

- MLS Supporters' Shield (1): 2015

=== Individual ===
- NASL Golden Glove Award (1): 2013
