= Dane Murphy =

American soccer player

Personal information
- Full name: Dane Murphy
- Date of birth: March 15, 1986 (age 40)
- Place of birth: Redding, Connecticut, U.S.
- Height: 1.89 m (6 ft 2 in)
- Position: Midfielder

Youth career
- 2004–2007: Virginia Cavaliers

Senior career*
Years	Team	Apps	(Gls)
2008–2009	D.C. United	0	(0)
2009–2011	VfL Osnabrück	3	(0)
2009–2011	VfL Osnabrück II	36	(1)
2012–2015	New York Cosmos	11	(0)
- * Club domestic league appearances and goals

Dane Murphy (born March 15, 1986) is an American retired soccer player.

Murphy played for D.C. United in Major League Soccer before joining German 2. Bundesliga team VfL Osnabrück. In 2012, he joined New York Cosmos in the North American Soccer League. After retirement in 2015, Murphy went into scouting for the Cosmos and then Real Salt Lake before being promoted to technical director. He returned to European football in 2019 as CEO of Barnsley F.C., before taking the same role at Nottingham Forest F.C.

== Playing career ==
=== High School ===
Murphy spent his high school career playing midfield for Choate Rosemary Hall. He received numerous awards during his career including being named First-Team All-State, All-Region and All-Founders League, being selected as a Parade All-American and being placed on Soccer America's "Players to Watch" list.

Murphy was also a member of the United States Under-20 National Pool and the United States Under-18 National Team. He played on the Founders League and New England championship squads and was a member of the Regional Team from 1999 to 2004.

=== Collegiate ===
Murphy selected the University of Virginia after looks from other top universities such as Wake Forest University, University of North Carolina and University of Notre Dame.

He made his collegiate debut on September 3, 2004, against Marshall University in the Virginia Soccer Classic. He played six more games during the 2004 season.

During the 2005 season, Murphy started 13 of the 14 games he appeared in, and scored two goals and had one assist during the 958 minutes he played. Both of his goals came in a victory over University of South Florida in the second round of the NCAA Tournament.

=== Professional ===
In 2008, Murphy signed with D.C. United of MLS where he was a member of their 2008 U.S. Open Cup winning team. He also started 12 matches for United's Reserves squad.

In 2009, he was signed to VFL Osnabrück in Germany's 2. Bundesliga, after a two-week trial. Over the next year and a half he played most of his competitive matches with VFL II.

In 2011, he was selected as the captain of the Cosmos PDL squad that participated in the 2011–12 exhibition matches with PDL teams throughout the Northeast United States.

Murphy was one of the longest tenured players on the Cosmos roster. He started and played in 88 minutes in the Paul Scholes Testimonial Match in August 2011 against Manchester United at Old Trafford.

On February 13, 2013, Murphy signed with the new New York Cosmos of the NASLand made his debut on October 6, 2013, as a stoppage time substitute in the Cosmos victory over Minnesota United FC. He appeared in 4 more games in the inaugural season that culminated in the team winning Soccer Bowl 2013 with a 1–0 victory over the Atlanta Silverbacks on November 9, 2013.

In the 2014 season, Murphy made seven appearances and four starts for the Cosmos as the team clinched a spot in The Championship – the NASL's four team postseason tournament.

== Scouting and Management ==
January 2015, Murphy retired as a professional to become the New York Cosmos Head Scout. Since his on field retirement and subsequent move into the New York Cosmos front office he served as a scout and then Technical Director for Real Salt Lake of the MLS.

On January 27, 2019, Murphy was hired as the Technical Director of D.C. United and Loudoun United FC. In this position, Murphy would work closely with coaching and technical staff to identify talented players domestically and globally in an aim to supplement the D.C. United first team roster and help develop the Black-and-Red's new USL affiliate.

In July 2019 Murphy was hired by Barnsley to replace Gauthier Ganaye who was returning to France as president of OGC Nice.

On July 19, 2021, Murphy was confirmed as the new CEO for Nottingham Forest. On 9 January 2023, Murphy and Forest mutually agreed to part ways.

In January 2025, Murphy was part of a five-member investment group that purchased Dutch football club SBV Vitesse from its creditors. However, following further due diligence, Murphy sold his shares to a local Dutch group within a few months of the original purchase.
