= Chris Rodd =

American soccer player (born 1985)

Personal information
- Full name: Christopher Henry Trevor Rodd
- Date of birth: April 9, 1985 (age 41)
- Place of birth: Danville, California, United States
- Height: 6 ft 3 in (1.91 m)
- Position: Defender

Youth career
- 2003–2004: College of William and Mary
- University of San Francisco

Senior career*
Years	Team	Apps	(Gls)
2003-2004	North Carolina FC	39	(4)
2005-2007	San Francisco Seals	49	(4)
2007	Brentford FC	11	(2)
2008–2011	Bryne FK	97	(4)
2012–2014	New York Cosmos	31	(1)
2015–2018	Sonoma County Sol	62	(4)

International career
2007	United States U23	4	(0)
- * Club domestic league appearances and goals

Christopher Henry Trevor Rodd (born April 9, 1985) is a former professional soccer player who played as a defender in Norway, England, and the USA.

== Biography ==
Rodd was born in Danville, California and raised in California. His father was born in Rugby, England, which allowed Rodd to become a British citizen in November 2005. Chris went to San Ramon Valley High School winning the North Coast Section Championship in 2002. Being named All-League for three years, he earned his ultimate individual accomplishment during his Junior campaign by being named North Coast Player of the Year. (Other winners of the award include Kamani Hill, Andrew Wiedeman, etc.). After high school, he attended the College of William and Mary on an athletic scholarship. After two years, he transferred to the University of San Francisco. While at USF, he was named to the All-Conference team in both years and earned All-Tournament in every tournament during his Junior year. Also, he earned team MVP in both his Junior and Senior seasons. At some point in all four college seasons, Rodd's college team was ranked in the top 10 in the country for a brief period.

During the off-seasons, he played in the USL Premier Development League for Raleigh CASL Elite in 2004, Williamsburg Legacy in 2005, and the San Francisco Seals in 2007. Rodd made his debut with the USA National team debut with the U-23s in 2005 at the Home Depot Center while playing with the San Francisco Seals. His club team, CASL Elite 85, went on to win Regionals and make it to the National Finals in 2004.

Rodd trained at Brentford Football Club in England during the summers of 2005 and 2006. However, he returned to college (USF) at the end of both years. Rodd made several first team appearances with Brentford.

In 2007, Rodd signed a three-year contract with Bryne FK from Norway's Adeccoligaen. He made his debut in 2007, playing 90 minutes in a 3–1 preseason win against Klepp, and has featured regularly for the first team during the 2008 Adeccoliagaen season. Rodd was named Player of the Match in 5 of the teams Adeccoligaen during his first pro year. He made 21 of 25 starts in 2008. He left Norway in 2011 when his contract expired.

Chris Rodd signed for the New York Cosmos in June 2013. Rodd scored his only goal in a match against La Liga side, Villarreal.

== International ==
In 2004, Rodd attended two camps with the U-20 USA National Team. In 2005, Rodd was capped with the U-23 USA National Team. He debuted at the Home Depot Center against Canada in a 4–0 win and scored the third goal.
