= Rovérsio =

Brazilian footballer

Personal information
- Full name: Rovérsio Rodrigues de Barros
- Date of birth: 17 January 1984 (age 42)
- Place of birth: Igarassu, Brazil
- Height: 1.87 m (6 ft 2 in)
- Position: Centre back

Senior career*
Years	Team	Apps	(Gls)
2001–2004	Santa Cruz		
2004–2007	Gil Vicente	72	(3)
2007–2008	Paços Ferreira	22	(0)
2008–2012	Osasuna	28	(2)
2010–2011	→ Betis (loan)	22	(3)
2012–2013	Orduspor	11	(1)
2013–2016	New York Cosmos	52	(1)
Total		207	(10)
- * Club domestic league appearances and goals

Rovérsio Rodrigues de Barros (born 17 January 1984), known simply as Rovérsio, is a Brazilian former professional footballer who played as a central defender.

== Football career ==
Born in Igarassu, Pernambuco, Rovérsio started playing with Santa Cruz Futebol Clube, moving abroad in the 2004–05 season to Portugal's Gil Vicente F.C. and making his Primeira Liga debut on 28 August 2004 in a 2–3 away loss against Sporting Clube de Portugal. During three years (the last spent in the second division), he was an important defensive element.

In 2007, Rovérsio signed a one-year contract with F.C. Paços de Ferreira, moving the following campaign to La Liga club CA Osasuna. On 13 November 2008, he suffered a serious knee injury in a Copa del Rey game against Getafe CF, which rendered him unavailable for nearly one year.

After recovering, Rovérsio was only the fourth-choice stopper, and appeared in just three games in the league season, one of those coming on 2 May 2010 in a 2–3 loss at Real Madrid. In late August, he was loaned to Real Betis in Segunda División, with the Andalusians having an option to make the move permanent at the end of the campaign for about €1.6 million.

Rovérsio returned to Osasuna for 2011–12, initially being made first-choice by manager José Luis Mendilibar. On 17 September 2011, he scored in his own net in a 0–8 away loss against FC Barcelona.

Rovérsio spent the 2012–13 season in Turkey with Orduspor. On 19 July 2013, the New York Cosmos announced they had agreed terms with the 29-year-old. He made his debut for the latter on 17 August against the Carolina RailHawks, and was a key contributor to a team that won the Soccer Bowl 2013, conceding only 12 goals in the process, a competition best; he was also named to the North American Soccer League Team of the Week twice.

During the 2014 Spring season, Rovérsio appeared in eight of nine games and helped anchor the center of a Cosmos defense that allowed just three goals in nine games, setting a modern NASL day record for minutes without conceding at 372. He battled a knee injury during the fall season, but made the NASL Team of the Week in round 14 for his performance in a 2–1 win against Ottawa Fury FC.
