= Danny Szetela =

American soccer player (born 1987)

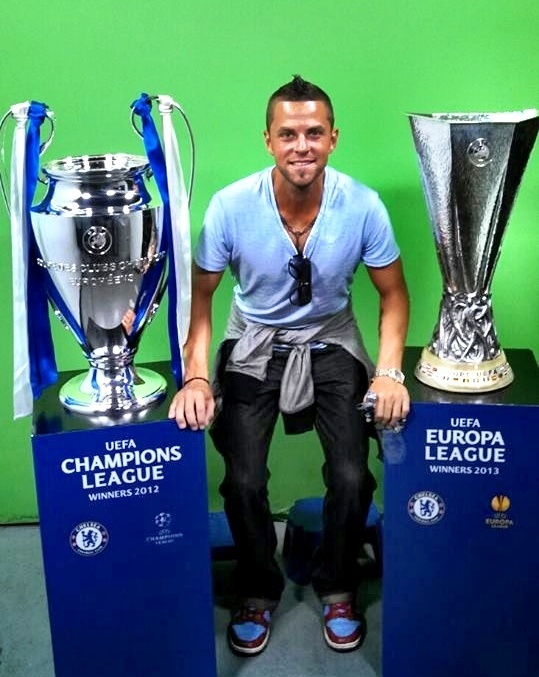

Personal information
- Full name: Daniel Gregory Szetela
- Date of birth: June 17, 1987 (age 39)
- Place of birth: Clifton, New Jersey, United States
- Height: 5 ft 10 in (1.78 m)
- Position: Midfielder

Team information
- Current team: Morris Elite SC

Youth career
- 2002–2004: IMG Soccer Academy

Senior career*
Years	Team	Apps	(Gls)
2004–2007	Columbus Crew	34	(0)
2007–2009	Racing Santander	0	(0)
2008–2009	→ Brescia (loan)	26	(1)
2009	D.C. United	4	(0)
2013	Icon FC		
2013–2017	New York Cosmos	105	(6)
2018–2019	New York Cosmos B	21	(6)
2020	New York Cosmos	3	(0)
2021	Morris Elite SC	9	(0)

International career
2003	United States U17	4	(2)
2005–2007	United States U20	7	(3)
2008	United States U23	4	(0)
2007–2008	United States	3	(0)
- * Club domestic league appearances and goals as of 10 November 2021

Daniel Gregory Szetela (born June 17, 1987) is an American former professional soccer player.

== Club career ==
=== Columbus Crew ===
In 2002, Szetela entered USSF's Bradenton Academy, graduating in May 2004. He then signed with Major League Soccer, but because he signed after the annual draft had taken place, his rights were made available to teams in a weighted lottery instead, with Columbus Crew ending up with his rights. His desire to play for his hometown club, the MetroStars, went unfulfilled. Joining in mid-season, Szetela appeared in eight regular season and two playoff games, while recording a solitary assist. In 2005, Szetela struggled to get on the field with the Crew. During 2006, he was beset by injury troubles and only saw four games for Columbus.

=== Europe ===
On August 31, 2007, Szetela was signed by Racing de Santander, in the Spanish Primera División. Szetela made his official debut with the Spanish club on November 14, in a scoreless draw against Málaga CF in the Copa del Rey. On January 29, 2008, Szetela was loaned out to Serie B side Brescia Calcio until June 30, 2008, with the option to purchase at the end. Szetela made his debut for Brescia Calcio on February 9, playing the last five minutes in a 4–2 comeback victory. He made ten appearances total in Serie B.

Szetela extended his loan to Brescia Calcio through June 2009 on July 18, 2008. He scored his first goal for Brescia, his first professional goal in league play, on October 18, 2008, against Triestina. He returned to Spain on July 13, 2009. However, the Spanish side decided against renewing his contract.

=== D.C. United ===
Szetela opted not to continue a career in Europe and returned to the States, signing a contract with Major League Soccer. His contract was picked up by D.C. United, who were second in the allocation order to sign returning U.S. international players.

After suffering a severe knee injury in training camp prior to the 2010 MLS Season, Szetela underwent a partial meniscectomy on February 3, 2010, to repair a torn meniscus in his right knee; however, it was unsuccessful. Shortly thereafter, on March 16, 2010, he was released by D.C. United.

=== New York Cosmos ===
He underwent a second failed operation in 2011 before having a third surgery later that year involving a meniscus transplant from a donor, which proved successful.

Following two years of rehabilitation, Szetela returned to organized soccer in 2013, joining Icon FC, who at the time competed in the Garden State Soccer League of the USASA, the fifth-tier of American soccer.

After impressing in U.S. Open Cup play with Icon FC, Szetela earned a tryout with New York Cosmos of the NASL. After a successful tryout, Szetela signed a contract with the Cosmos on July 1, 2013.

Szetela appeared in 13 games for the Cosmos during the 2013 season and scored his first goal with the Cosmos in a 4–0 victory against the Carolina Railhawks on October 12, 2013. Szetela was named to the NASL Team of the Week in Week 8 and 11 of the 2013 season. He was in the starting lineup for the 2013 NASL Soccer Bowl and helped the Cosmos capture their sixth NASL title of all time, defeating the Atlanta Silverbacks 1–0.

On January 7, 2014, Szetela signed a contract extension with the Cosmos.

During the 2014 Spring season, Szetela scored one goal in eight appearances for the club and was named to the Spring Week 8 NASL Team of the Week.

He scored the game-winning goal in the team's 3–2 home victory over the Atlanta Silverbacks on September 13, 2014, earning NASL Team of the Week honors and scored again two weeks later in the team's 1–1 draw with FC Edmonton while once again being named to the NASL Team of the Week for his performance.

He finished the 2014 regular season with three goals and one assist in 23 appearances (21 starts). Szetela finished the 2015 regular season with 29 appearances for the Cosmos.

After five years with the Cosmos, Szetela mulled retirement after the NASL suspended play for 2018. After announcing that he would sign with NPSL side FC Motown in New Jersey, Danny instead re-signed with the Cosmos.

=== Morris Elite SC ===
Following the Cosmos hiatus during the NISA Spring 2021 season, Szetela signed with USL League Two side Morris Elite SC ahead of their inaugural season.

== International career ==
In 2003, Szetela burst onto the world's stage during the Under-17 World Cup in Finland. The second-youngest player on the United States roster, he started all four American games, scoring two goals. In 2005, he was called up to the U.S. U-20 national team for the 2005 2005 World Youth Championship in the Netherlands. He played two games in that tournament. On June 30, 2007, Szetela scored the opening goal in the United States' match against South Korea in the U-20 World Cup. Three days later he recorded two goals in a winning effort over Poland, the country of both his parents.

Szetela made his debut for the U.S. on October 17, 2007, as a late-match substitute against Switzerland, and set up Michael Bradley's game-winning goal. The win snapped a five-game losing streak for the national team, and provided their first win over Switzerland in seven matches. For a while, Szetela, who has a Polish passport and speaks Polish, was unsure of his international allegiances, as his parents wanted him to play for Poland. However, after the former coach of Poland national team, Paweł Janas, stated publicly that "in Poland we have 200 players like Szetela," he decided to play for the U.S. In July 2008, Szetela was named to the U.S. team that competed in the 2008 Beijing Olympics.

== Personal life ==
Szetela grew up in Clifton, New Jersey. His parents are Polish immigrants and the Szetela household was bilingual. His father Julian was an accomplished player in Poland before migrating to the U.S.

== Honors ==
New York Cosmos

- NASL Regular Season (3): 2013 (Fall), 2015 (Spring), 2016 (Fall)
- Soccer Bowl (3): 2013, 2015, 2016

New York Cosmos B

- NPSL North Atlantic Conference Champion (2): 2018, 2019
- NPSL Northeast Region Champion (1): 2019
