= Diomar Díaz =

Venezuelan footballer (born 1990)

Personal information
- Full name: Diomar Ángel Díaz Calderón
- Date of birth: 3 March 1990 (age 36)
- Place of birth: Guasdualito, Apure, Venezuela
- Height: 1.70 m (5 ft 7 in)
- Position: Midfielder

Team information
- Current team: Deportivo Táchira
- Number: 11

Youth career
- Deportivo Petare

Senior career*
Years	Team	Apps	(Gls)
2010–2012	Deportivo Petare	43	(4)
2012–2013	Mineros de Guayana	16	(3)
2013–2014	New York Cosmos	26	(6)
2014–2018	Caracas	65	(8)
2019	Atlético Venezuela	34	(0)
2020–2021	Jaguares de Córdoba	31	(6)
2022	Atlético Bucaramanga	27	(1)
2023–	Deportivo Táchira	30	(3)
- * Club domestic league appearances and goals as of 18 August 2023

Diomar Ángel Díaz Calderón (born 3 March 1990) is a Venezuelan professional footballer who plays as a midfielder for Deportivo Táchira.

== Career ==
Díaz began his career in Venezuela with Deportivo Petare and Mineros de Guayana, scoring four goals in 43 appearances with Deportivo Petare and three goals in 16 appearances with Mineros de Guyana before signing with NASL club New York Cosmos on 2 May 2013.

Díaz made his debut for the Cosmos in the opening match of the 2013 NASL Fall season on 3 August 2013, which ended in a 2–1 victory over the Fort Lauderdale Strikers. Three weeks later, Díaz scored his first goal for the Cosmos in a 2–1 victory over the San Antonio Scorpions.

Díaz went on to score five goals in 13 appearances for the Cosmos during the 2013 season, on the way to winning the 2013 NASL Fall title and NASL Soccer Bowl over the Atlanta Silverbacks 1–0. He finished the regular season tied with Marcos Senna for most goals scored on the team and was named to the NASL Team of the Week in Weeks 8, 9, and 11.

Díaz battled a variety of injuries during the 2014 season which limited his playing time. He finished the regular season strongly however, scoring in the team's 2–1 victory over Ottawa Fury FC on 11 October 2014 and appearing in all six of the team's final regular season matches. He finished the 2014 regular season with one goal in 12 appearances (8 starts) for the Cosmos. Díaz was named to the NASL Fall Team of Week 14 for his goal in the team's 2–1 win over Ottawa.
