= 2013 North American Soccer League season =

North American Soccer League
- Season: 2013
- Champions: New York Cosmos
- North American Supporters' Trophy: Carolina RailHawks
- Matches: 98
- Goals: 275 (2.81 per match)
- Top goalscorer: (United States) Brian Shriver (15)
- Biggest home win: TBR 4, FTL 0 (July 4); NYC 4, CAR 0 (October 12); FTL 6, ATL 2 (October 19)
- Biggest away win: SAS 4, FTL 1 (June 29); TBR 7, SAS 4 (August 3)
- Highest scoring: TBR 7, SAS 4 (August 3)
- Longest winning run: SAS (6/1 - 7/4); NYC (9/14 - 10/24) (5 games)
- Longest unbeaten run: NYC (8/24 - 11/2) (11 games)
- Longest losing run: SAS (5 games) (8/3 - 8/31)
- Highest attendance: 11,929; FTL @ NYC (August 3)
- Lowest attendance: 921; SAS @ EDM (April 28)
- Total attendance: 457,674
- Average attendance: 4,670

The 2013 North American Soccer League season was the 46th season of Division II soccer in the United States and the third season of the revived North American Soccer League. It was contested by eight teams including one from Canada. Expansion club New York Cosmos was added to the NASL during the season. A split season format was used for the first time. Puerto Rico Islanders, originally planned to take part in this season, as they did in first two editions, took the year off, due to planned restructuring. The defending Soccer Bowl champions were the Tampa Bay Rowdies, while the San Antonio Scorpions were the defending North American Supporters' Trophy winners.

== Personnel and sponsorship ==
Note1: Flags indicate national team as has been defined under FIFA eligibility rules. Players and managers may hold one or more non-FIFA nationalities.

Team	Head coach	Captain	Shirt sponsor
Atlanta Silverbacks	(Trinidad and Tobago) Brian Haynes	(England) Martyn Lancaster	Reto Sports
Carolina RailHawks	(Northern Ireland) Colin Clarke	(United States) Austin da Luz	Blue Cross and Blue Shield Association
FC Edmonton	(Canada) Colin Miller	(Northern Ireland) Albert Watson	The Fath Group
Fort Lauderdale Strikers	(Austria) Günter Kronsteiner	(Honduras) Ivan Guerrero	Joma
Minnesota United	(United States) Manny Lagos	TBA	Admiral
New York Cosmos	(Venezuela) Giovanni Savarese	(United States) Carlos Mendes	Emirates
San Antonio Scorpions	(Canada) Alen Marcina (Interim)	(Canada) Kevin Harmse	Nike
Tampa Bay Rowdies	(England) Ricky Hill	(United States) Frank Sanfilippo	Admiral / Mainsail Suites

=== Managerial changes ===
Team	Outgoing manager	Manner of departure	Date of vacancy	Position in table	Incoming manager	Date of appointment
New York Cosmos	Expansion franchise				(Venezuela) Giovanni Savarese	19 November 2012
Fort Lauderdale Strikers	(United States) Daryl Shore	Fired	30 June 2013	7th (Spring Season)	(Brazil) Ricardo Lopes	30 June 2013
Fort Lauderdale Strikers	(Brazil) Ricardo Lopes	End of interim period	17 July 2013	7th (Spring Season)	(Austria) Günter Kronsteiner	17 July 2013
San Antonio Scorpions	(United States) Tim Hankinson	Fired	27 August 2013	8th (Fall Season)	(Canada) Alen Marcina	27 August 2013

== Teams ==
Locations of NASL clubs

== Spring season ==
The New York Cosmos and the Puerto Rico Islanders did not participate in the spring season. (April 6 to July 4)

=== Standings ===
Pos	Team	Pld	W	D	L	GF	GA	GD	Pts	Qualification
1	Atlanta Silverbacks (S)	12	6	3	3	20	15	+5	21	Soccer Bowl 2013
2	Carolina RailHawks	12	5	5	2	20	16	+4	20	
3	San Antonio Scorpions	12	6	2	4	19	15	+4	20	
4	Tampa Bay Rowdies	12	5	3	4	21	16	+5	18	
5	FC Edmonton	12	3	5	4	13	12	+1	14	
6	Minnesota United FC	12	4	2	6	18	23	−5	14	
7	Fort Lauderdale Strikers	12	2	2	8	10	24	−14	8	

Source: NASL Standings
Rules for classification: 1) points; 2) goal difference; 3) number of goals scored.
(S) Spring season champion

=== Results ===
Home \ Away	ATL	CAR	FCE	FTL	MNU	SAS	TBR
Atlanta Silverbacks		2–0	1–1	2–0	2–3	1–0	1–2
Carolina RailHawks	1–1		2–1	3–1	3–2	5–2	2–1
FC Edmonton	3–0	1–1		0–1	3–1	1–0	0–0
Fort Lauderdale Strikers	0–1	1–1	1–1		2–1	1–4	1–2
Minnesota United	0–3	2–2	2–0	2–1		0–0	2–3
San Antonio Scorpions	2–2	2–0	2–1	3–1	2–0		0–2
Tampa Bay Rowdies	3–4	0–0	1–1	4–0	2–3	1–2	

Updated to match(es) played on 4 July 2013. Source: Schedule
Legend: Blue = home team win; Yellow = draw; Red = away team win.

== Fall season ==
The New York Cosmos began participating in the fall season. (August 3 to November 2)

=== Standings ===
Pos	Team	Pld	W	D	L	GF	GA	GD	Pts	Qualification
1	New York Cosmos (F)	14	9	4	1	22	12	+10	31	Soccer Bowl 2013
2	Carolina RailHawks	14	7	2	5	21	16	+5	23	
3	Tampa Bay Rowdies	14	5	5	4	30	27	+3	20	
4	Minnesota United FC	14	6	2	6	21	19	+2	20	
5	Fort Lauderdale Strikers	14	5	3	6	18	20	−2	18	
6	FC Edmonton	14	3	7	4	13	14	−1	16	
7	Atlanta Silverbacks	14	4	4	6	14	22	−8	16	
8	San Antonio Scorpions	14	3	1	10	15	24	−9	10	

Source: NASL Standings
Rules for classification: 1) points; 2) goal difference; 3) number of goals scored.
(F) Fall season champion

=== Results ===
Home \ Away	ATL	CAR	FCE	FTL	MNU	NYC	SAS	TBR
Atlanta Silverbacks		1–1	1–0	0–1	3–1	0–1	2–1	1–1
Carolina RailHawks	4–0		1–0	2–0	1–0	3–0	2–1	2–2
FC Edmonton	1–1	2–1		1–1	1–2	1–1	1–0	2–1
Fort Lauderdale Strikers	6–2	1–0	1–1		1–3	0–2	0–0	2–1
Minnesota United	0–1	0–1	1–1	3–1		0–1	1–0	1–1
New York Cosmos	1–1	4–0	1–1	1–0	1–0		2–1	4–3
San Antonio Scorpions	1–0	2–1	1–0	1–2	2–3	1–2		4–7
Tampa Bay Rowdies	3–1	3–2	1–1	2–1	4–6	0–0	1–0	

Updated to match(es) played on 2 November 2013. Source: Schedule
Legend: Blue = home team win; Yellow = draw; Red = away team win.

== Soccer Bowl 2013 ==
Soccer Bowl 2013 was contested by the winners of the spring and fall seasons. The game was hosted by the winner of the spring season.

November 9, 2013
7:00 PM EDT

Atlanta Silverbacks	0–1	New York Cosmos
Carr (yellow card) 42'; Navarro (yellow card) 82'	Report	Szetela (yellow card) 11'; Freeman (yellow card) 45+1'; Senna 50'

Atlanta Silverbacks Park
Chamblee, Georgia
Attendance: 7,211
Referee: Edvin Jurisevic

== Statistical leaders ==
=== Top scorers ===
Rank	Player	Nation	Club	Goals
1	Brian Shriver	USA	Carolina RailHawks	15
2	Pablo Campos	BRA	Minnesota United	13
3	Hans Denissen	NED	San Antonio Scorpions	12
3	Georgi Hristov	BUL	Tampa Bay Rowdies	12
5	Luke Mulholland	ENG	Tampa Bay Rowdies	11
6	Tomasz Zahorski	POL	San Antonio Scorpions	9
7	Rubén Luna	MEX	Atlanta Silverbacks	8
7	Pedro Mendes	BRA	Atlanta Silverbacks	8
9	Simone Bracalello	ITA	Minnesota United	7
10	Evans Frimpong	GHA	Tampa Bay Rowdies	6

=== Top goalkeepers ===
(Minimum of 10 Games Played)

Rank	Goalkeeper	Club	GP	MINS	SVS	GA	GAA	SO
1	(United States) Kyle Reynish	New York Cosmos	13	1170	39	12	0.923	5
2	(United States) Lance Parker	FC Edmonton	20	1736	79	19	0.990	3
3	(Japan) Akira Fitzgerald	Carolina RailHawks	25	2250	91	32	1.280	6
4	(United States) Jeremy Vuolo	San Antonio Scorpions	14	1238	54	18	1.314	3
5	(Mexico) Richard Sánchez	Fort Lauderdale Strikers	14	1260	45	20	1.429	3
6	(United States) Matt Van Oekel	Minnesota United	18	1620	52	28	1.556	1
7	(United States) Joe Nasco	Atlanta Silverbacks	20	1642	75	30	1.648	4
8	(United States) Diego Restrepo	Tampa Bay Rowdies	23	2069	138	38	1.652	4
9	(United States) Patrick Hannigan	San Antonio Scorpions	13	1102	38	21	1.721	1

== Individual awards ==
=== Monthly awards ===
Month	NASL Player of the Month			
Month	Player	Nation	Club	Link
April	Luke Mulholland	ENG	Tampa Bay Rowdies	3G 2A
May	Simone Bracalello	ITA	Minnesota United	3G
June	Hans Denissen	NED	San Antonio Scorpions	6G
August	Chris Nurse	GUY	FC Edmonton	3G 1A
September	Georgi Hristov	BUL	Tampa Bay Rowdies	4G 1A
October	Luke Mulholland	ENG	Tampa Bay Rowdies	4G

=== League awards ===
- Golden Ball (MVP): (Bulgaria) Georgi Hristov (Tampa Bay Rowdies)
- Golden Boot: (United States) Brian Shriver (Carolina RailHawks)
- Golden Glove: (United States) Kyle Reynish (New York Cosmos)
- Coach of the Year: (Trinidad and Tobago) Brian Haynes (Atlanta Silverbacks)
- Goal of the Year: (Guatemala) Henry Lopez (New York Cosmos)

NASL Best XI
Position	Players	Team
Goalkeeper	(United States) Joe Nasco	Atlanta Silverbacks
Defense	(United States) Aaron Pitchkolan	Minnesota United FC
Defense	(England) Martyn Lancaster	Atlanta Silverbacks
Defense	(Northern Ireland) Albert Watson	FC Edmonton
Midfield	(England) Luke Mulholland	Tampa Bay Rowdies
Midfield	(United States) Miguel Ibarra	Minnesota United FC
Midfield	(El Salvador) Richard Menjivar	Atlanta Silverbacks
Midfield	(Spain) Marcos Senna	New York Cosmos
Forward	(Bulgaria) Georgi Hristov	Tampa Bay Rowdies
Forward	(United States) Brian Shriver	Carolina RailHawks
Forward	(Netherlands) Hans Denissen	San Antonio Scorpions

== Attendance ==
For 2013 the teams had the following average attendance:

Team	Attendance
New York Cosmos	6,859
San Antonio Scorpions	6,937
Carolina Railhawks	4,708
Atlanta Silverbacks	4,364
Fort Lauderdale Strikers	4,224
Tampa Bay Rowdies	4,051
Minnesota United	3,679
FC Edmonton	2,760
