= Henry López (footballer, born 1992) =

Guatemalan footballer

Personal information
- Full name: Henry David López Guerra
- Date of birth: 8 August 1992 (age 34)
- Place of birth: Guatemala City, Guatemala
- Height: 1.73 m (5 ft 8 in)
- Position: Striker

Youth career
- 2002–2009: Municipal

Senior career*
Years	Team	Apps	(Gls)
2011–2012	Noroeste	1	(0)
2013–2014	New York Cosmos	5	(2)
2015–2016	Municipal	30	(8)
2016	Caracas	4	(0)
2016–2020	Cobán Imperial	51	(2)

International career
- Guatemala U17
2011	Guatemala U20	7	(1)
2011–	Guatemala	7	(0)
- * Club domestic league appearances and goals

Henry David López (born 8 August 1992) is a Guatemalan professional footballer who plays as a forward.

== Career ==
=== Club ===
López began his career in the youth ranks of Municipal, where he played from 2002 to 2009. During the 2010 season he was on the books of Real Maryland F.C. After a brief stay in the United States, López signed with Brazilian club EC Noroeste. However, visa problems affected his stay in Brazil.

On February 21, 2013, López signed on to play for New York Cosmos in the team's inaugural year in the NASL.

For the 2015–16 season, López decided to return to Guatemala and signed with Municipal. He scored 6 goals in his first 13 matches, finishing the season with a stat line of 8 goals in 30 matches, playing 54 minutes per game.

López signed with Caracas for the Torneo Clausura of the 2016 Season.

=== International ===
His game-winning goal in 2011 Under-20 World Cup Qualification against the United States qualified Guatemala to the 2011 U20 World Cup, in Colombia, Guatemala's debut World Cup appearance at any level.

He appeared for two matches on the Guatemala national football team for the 2011 CONCACAF Gold Cup.
