= Hunter Freeman =

American soccer player

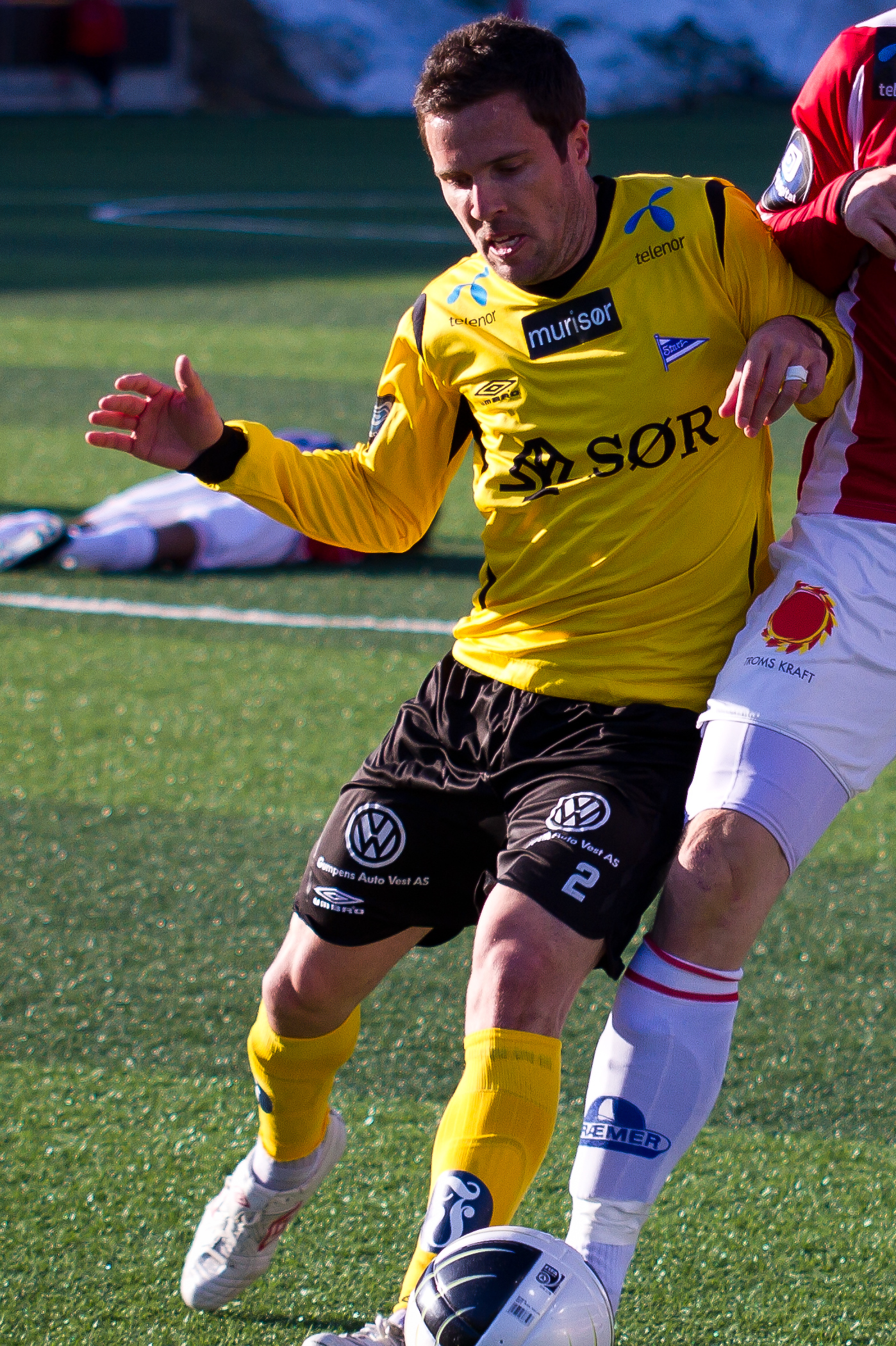
- Hunter Freeman playing for Start

Personal information
- Full name: Hunter Freeman
- Date of birth: January 8, 1985 (age 41)
- Place of birth: Tyler, Texas, United States
- Height: 6 ft 0 in (1.83 m)
- Positions: Defender; midfielder

College career
Years	Team	Apps	(Gls)
2002–2004	Virginia Cavaliers		

Senior career*
Years	Team	Apps	(Gls)
2003	Texas Spurs	9	(1)
2005–2006	Colorado Rapids	47	(0)
2007–2008	New York Red Bulls	30	(1)
2008	Toronto FC	7	(0)
2009–2010	IK Start	51	(2)
2011	Houston Dynamo	23	(1)
2012	Colorado Rapids	19	(0)
2013–2016	New York Cosmos	73	(3)
2016–2017	Miami FC	41	(0)
2018	FC Motown	0	(0)

International career^{‡}
2004–2005	United States U20	19	(1)
2007–2008	United States U23	5	(0)

Managerial career
- 2013: Adelphi Panthers (volunteer asst.)
- 2018–: FC Cincinnati (director of scouting)
- * Club domestic league appearances and goals as of 10 May 2018 ‡ National team caps and goals as of November 26, 2010

Hunter Freeman (born January 8, 1985, in Tyler, Texas) is a retired American soccer player who currently is the director of domestic scouting for FC Cincinnati

== Career ==
=== College and amateur ===
As a teenager, Freeman trained in residency at the United States Soccer Federation's Bradenton Academy with the United States Under-17 national team. Upon graduating, he attended the University of Virginia, where he played college soccer from 2002 to 2004. Freeman led the nation in his junior season with 21 assists, and was named first-team All-Atlantic Coast Conference. He also played with the Texas Spurs in the USL Premier Development League.

=== Professional ===
Following the 2004 season, Freeman signed a Generation adidas contract with Major League Soccer and was subsequently selected seventh overall in the 2005 MLS SuperDraft by Colorado Rapids. He would go on to appear in 47 league matches, including 38 starts for Colorado during his two years at the club.

In March 2007, Freeman was traded to New York Red Bulls for a 2008 MLS SuperDraft 3rd round pick and a 2009 4th round Supplemental Draft pick. Freeman scored his first MLS goal in a 1–0 win over FC Dallas on April 26, 2007. After a promising start to his Red Bull career, Freeman was forced to the sidelines due to injury and his form suffered. He eventually lost his starting role, but by the end of the season he regained his form and contributed to the team's playoff run. During the 2007 regular season Freeman appeared in 16 games, including 15 starts, scoring one goal and assisting on another. He also started and played the full 90 minutes in the club's two playoff games.

He was traded to Toronto FC on September 12, 2008. Despite Freeman having already agreed to join IK Start of the Norwegian leagues, Toronto FC gave up two supplemental draft picks to acquire him for four months. Trade conditions also dictated that New York retain the MLS rights to Freeman.

On July 11, 2009, Freeman scored his first goal for Start on a free kick. Start won the game 2–1. After two seasons with IK Start, Freeman moved back to the US, joining Houston Dynamo. Houston sent allocation money to New York to acquire the rights to Freeman. Houston also received a third-round selection in the 2012 MLS SuperDraft.

At season's end, Houston declined his 2012 contract option and he entered the 2011 MLS Re-Entry Draft. Freeman was selected by Colorado Rapids in stage two of the draft on December 12, 2011. He signed with Colorado on January 6, 2012.

At the end of 2012, Colorado declined the 2013 contract option for Freeman and he entered the 2012 MLS Re-Entry Draft. On December 14, 2012, Freeman was selected in stage two of the draft by New England Revolution, but was never signed. Freeman signed with the expansion New York Cosmos of the North American Soccer League on February 12, 2013. During their reboot season, Freeman appeared and started in 13 games for the Cosmos and logged 1160 minutes for the club. The season culminated in a 1–0 championship game victory over the Atlanta Silverbacks, as the Cosmos were awarded the 2013 NASL Soccer Bowl. Freeman helped anchor a defense that allowed an NASL-low 12 goals during the 2013 Fall season.

Freeman played in all 810 minutes of the 2014 Spring season and was part of a defense that allowed an NASL-low three goals in nine games while posting a 6–1–2 (W-D-L) record and finished in second place in the NASL Spring standings. The Cosmos defense also set an NASL modern-day record, going 372 minutes without conceding a goal.

Freeman played in every minute of every game in the 2014 season except for the last regular season game of the year when he was rested for the playoffs. Freeman contributed a goal and two assists in his 26 starts and 2340 minutes of action and was named the Emirates Cosmos Player of the Year for his 2014 performance. He was nominated to the NASL Team of the Week four times over the course of the 2014 season.

In 2015, Freeman made 14 starts in 15 appearances for the Cosmos in their Championship season. He scored two goals and added two assists in 1,217 minutes throughout that time. Freeman also logged a full 180 minutes in both matches of the Championship en route to his second NASL title with the Cosmos.

=== International ===
Freeman has played for various youth United States national teams, and was part of the United States U-20 men's national soccer team at the 2005 FIFA World Youth Championship. He was also called up to the United States U-23 men's national soccer team for the 2008 CONCACAF Men's Pre-Olympic Tournament, which qualified the Americans for the 2008 Summer Olympics.

=== Broadcasting ===
Freeman was a color commentator with ONE World Sports for their coverage of the 2015 Asian Cup. Also, while he was out with injury, he was a color commentator for the April 11th Cosmos' match against the Indy Eleven.
