= 2014 Atlanta Silverbacks season =

Atlanta Silverbacks
2014 season
- Manager: Alejandro Pombo
- Stadium: Atlanta Silverbacks Park
- Spring: 8th
- Fall: 9th
- Playoffs: TBD
- Open Cup: Quarterfinals
- Top goalscorer: League: Jaime Chavez (8); All: Jaime Chavez (11)
- Highest home attendance: 5,327 (July 9 v. Chicago)
- Lowest home attendance: 3,011 (July 19 v. Edmonton)
- Average home league attendance: 4,447
| Home colors | Away colors |

The 2014 season was the Atlanta Silverbacks' 18th season of existence, and their 4th consecutive season playing in the North American Soccer League, the second division of the American soccer pyramid.

== Background ==
The Atlanta Silverbacks had a long run in 2013. In the Spring Season, they finished first place and booked their ticket to host the Soccer Bowl. They finished seventh in the fall season, but still were in the final match to decide the NASL Champion. The Silverbacks lost 1–0 to the New York Cosmos in the 2013 Soccer Bowl.

They had close results in the U.S. Open Cup, winning their first match against fourth division opponent Georgia Revolution 3–2. Then losing to MLS side Real Salt Lake 2–3 in overtime a week later.

On December 9, 2013, first-year head coach Brian Haynes was not given a contract extension, leaving the Silverbacks without a head coach.

On January 7, the Silverbacks announced that they would eliminate the head coaching position, and have technical director, Eric Wynalda, manage the team. Wynalda has the most professional experience of the club staff as he played in MLS, Germany, and Mexico for 20 years. Wynalda also has 106 US National Team caps, and is third on the countries all-time scoring list with 34 goals.

== Club ==
=== Current roster ===
As of October 1, 2014

| No. | Position | Nation | Player |
|---|---|---|---|
| 2 | DF | USA | Edgar Espinoza |
| 5 | MF | USA | Blair Gavin |
| 7 | MF | HON | Junior Sandoval |
| 8 | DF | ARG | Ramiro Canovas |
| 9 | FW | BLZ | Deon McCaulay |
| 10 | MF | GHA | Kwadwo Poku |
| 11 | MF | USA | Pablo Cruz |
| 12 | GK | USA | Thomas Hunter |
| 13 | MF | LBR | Borfor Carr |
| 14 | MF | ARG | Lucas Paulini |
| 15 | DF | SLE | Abdul Bangura |
| 16 | GK | CMR | Eric Ati |
| 17 | MF | CRC | Brandon Poltronieri |
| 18 | DF | USA | Mitch Garcia |
| 19 | FW | USA | Jaime Chavez |
| 20 | MF | COL | Janny Rivera |
| 21 | FW | USA | Kellen Gulley |
| 23 | MF | BRA | Paulo Ferreira-Mendes |
| 25 | MF | COD | Ferrety Sousa |
| 29 | DF | USA | Mike Randolph (captain) |
| 33 | MF | ESA | Junior Burgos |
| 38 | DF | USA | Ryan Roushandel |
| 45 | MF | TOG | Alex Harlley |
| 70 | MF | USA | Jesus Gonzalez |
| 99 | FW | SLE | Shaka Bangura |

=== Technical Staff ===
- (United States) Jason Smith – Head Coach
- (United States) Eric Wynalda – Technical Director
- (Costa Rica) Ricardo Montoya – Assistant Coach
- (Uruguay) Alejandro Pombo – Assistant Coach
- (Peru) Eduardo "Lalo" Liza – Assistant Coach
- (Colombia) Juan Castellanos – Fitness Coach

=== Front Office Staff ===
- (Croatia) Boris Jerkunica – Chairman
- (United States) John Latham – Vice-Chairman
- (United States) Andy Smith – General Manager
- (United States) Neal Malone – Marketing and PR Manager
- (United States) Michael Wheeler – Account Executive
- (United States) Kaila Muecke – Account Executive
- (United States) Malcolm Johnson – Account Executive
- (United States) Pete Zeskind – Account Executive
- (United States) Nathan Charlton – Operations Manager
- (United States) Samantha Yourstone – Event Marketing Coordinator

== Transfers ==
=== In ===
| Date | Pos. | Name | Previous club | Fee |
|---|---|---|---|---|
| January 20, 2014 | FW | (United States) Matt Horth | (United States) New England Revolution | None |
| January 23, 2014 | MF | (Honduras) Junior Sandoval | (Honduras) C.D. Marathón | None |
| January 24, 2014 | MF | (Ghana) Kwadwo Poku | (United States) Georgia Revolution | None |
| January 31, 2014 | MF | (United States) Blair Gavin | (United States) Seattle Sounders FC | None |
| February 4, 2014 | MF | (Argentina) Lucas Paulini | (United States) Atlanta Silverbacks | Re-sign |
| February 25, 2014 | FW | (Belize) Deon McCaulay | (Belize) Belmopan Bandits | None |
| February 26, 2014 | GK | (El Salvador) Derby Carrillo | (El Salvador) Santa Tecla | None |
| February 26, 2014 | MF | (El Salvador) Junior Burgos | (Canada) Toronto FC | None |
| February 27, 2014 | GK | (Cameroon) Eric Ati | (United States) Atlanta Silverbacks | Re-sign |
| February 27, 2014 | DF | (United States) Mitch Garcia | (United States) Vermont Voltage | None |
| February 28, 2014 | DF | (Sierra Leone) Abdul Bangura | (Sweden) Härnösands FF | None |
| March 3, 2014 | DF | (Argentina) Ramiro Canovas | (United States) Silverbacks Reserves | None |
| March 6, 2014 | DF | (United States) Edgar Espinoza | (United States) Los Angeles Misioneros | None |
| March 6, 2014 | MF | (Colombia) Janny Rivera | (United States) Silverbacks Reserves | None |
| March 6, 2014 | MF | (Togo) Alex Harlley | (United States) FC Santa Clarita | None |
| April 9, 2014 | FW | (United States) Jaime Chavez | (United States) Los Angeles Misioneros | None |
| April 18, 2014 | DF | (United States) Ryan Roushandel | (Puerto Rico) Sevilla PR | None |
| April 25, 2014 | MF | (Democratic Republic of the Congo) Ferrety Sousa | (United States) Atlanta Silverbacks | Re-sign |
| May 1, 2014 | GK | (United States) Thomas Hunter | (United States) Chattanooga FC | None |
| May 1, 2014 | GK | (Republic of Ireland) Chip Sanders | (United States) Orlando City U-23 | None |
| July 7, 2014 | FW | (United States) Kellen Gulley | (United States) Chicago Fire | None |
| August 7, 2014 | MF | (Costa Rica) Brandon Poltronieri | (Costa Rica) Carmelita | None |
| September 5, 2014 | MF | (Brazil) Paulo Ferreira-Mendes | (United States) New York Cosmos | None |
| September 30, 2014 | FW | (Sierra Leone) Shaka Bangura | (Indonesia) Barito Putera | None |

=== Out ===
| Date | Pos. | Name | New Club | Fee |
|---|---|---|---|---|
| November 9, 2013 | DF | (Peru) Eduardo Liza | Retired | |
| November 29, 2013 | DF | (United States) Mark Bloom | (Canada) Toronto FC | Undisclosed |
| December 10, 2013 | MF | (United States) Milton Blanco | (Canada) FC Edmonton | Free |
| December 10, 2013 | FW | (Brazil) Pedro Ferreira-Mendes | (United States) Indy Eleven | Free |
| December 10, 2013 | MF | (United States) Danny Barrera | (United States) San Antonio Scorpions | Free |
| December 10, 2013 | MF | (United States) Mark Withers | (United States) Dallas Sidekicks (Indoor) | Free |
| December 10, 2013 | MF | (United States) Brandon Manzonelli | (United States) St. Louis Ambush (Indoor) | Free |
| December 10, 2013 | DF | (United States) Willie Hunt | (United States) Tampa Bay Rowdies | Free |
| December 10, 2013 | FW | (United States) Brad Stisser | (United States) Arizona United SC | Free |
| December 10, 2013 | GK | (United States) Cody Mizell | (United States) Tampa Bay Rowdies | Free |
| January 13, 2014 | FW | (United States) Kellen Gulley | (United States) Chicago Fire | Free |
| January 24, 2014 | MF | (Jamaica) Horace James | (Canada) FC Edmonton | Released |
| February 4, 2014 | MF | (El Salvador) Richard Menjivar | (United States) San Antonio Scorpions | Free |
| February 7, 2014 | FW | (United States) Matt Horth | (Iceland) Leiknir Reykjavík | Undisclosed |
| February 12, 2014 | GK | (United States) Joe Nasco | (United States) Colorado Rapids | Free |
| March 5, 2014 | MF | (United States) Mario Uribe | Free agent | Released |
| April 9, 2014 | DF | (United States) Josh Suggs | (United States) Orange County Blues | Released |
| April 9, 2014 | MF | (United States) Scott Rojo | Free agent | Released |
| April 28, 2014 | FW | (United States) David Estrada | (United States) Seattle Sounders FC | Loan Return |
| May 9, 2014 | DF | (England) Martyn Lancaster | (United States) Georgia Revolution | Free |
| May 10, 2014 | GK | (Republic of Ireland) Chip Sanders | Free agent | Released |
| May 10, 2014 | MF | (Colombia) Alex Caceres | Free agent | Released |
| June 30, 2014 | DF | (United States) Bobby Reiss | Retired | |
| July 12, 2014 | DF | (United States) Beto Navarro | (Canada) FC Edmonton | Undisclosed |
| August 5, 2014 | GK | (El Salvador) Derby Carillo | (El Salvador) Santa Tecla | Released |

=== Loan In ===
| Date | Pos. | Name | From | Until |
|---|---|---|---|---|
| April 3, 2014 | FW | (United States) David Estrada | (United States) Seattle Sounders FC | April 28, 2013 |
| July 15, 2014 | GK | (United States) Joe Nasco | (United States) Colorado Rapids | August 9, 2014 |

== Pre-season friendlies ==
=== Pre-season ===
| Date | Opponents | H / A | Result F–A | Scorers | Time |
|---|---|---|---|---|---|
| March 2, 2014 | Clayton State Lakers | H | 2–1 | Kwadwo Poku x2 | 4:00 PM EST |
| March 15, 2014 | Charlotte Eagles | H | 0–1 | | 4:00 PM EST |
| March 21, 2014 | UAB Blazers | A | 3–0 | Deon McCaulay, Lucas Paulini, Edgar Espinoza | 8:00 PM EST |
| March 23, 2014 | AUM Warhawks | N | 3–0 | Bobby Reiss, Edgar Espinoza, Junior Burgos | 3:00 PM EST |
| March 29, 2014 | Young Harris Lions | H | 4–1 | Deon McCaulay x3, Kwadwo Poku | 4:00 PM EST |
| March 30, 2014 | USC Gamecocks | H | 0–0 | | 3:00 PM EST |
| April 5, 2014 | Clemson Tigers | H | 2–2 | Kwadwo Poku, Junior Sandoval | 5:00 PM EST |
| April 6, 2014 | Carson–Newman Eagles | H | 4–2 | Blair Gavin, Junior Burgos x2, David Estrada | 3:00 PM EST |

== Competitions ==
| Competition | Started round | Current Position | Final position | First match | Last match |
|---|---|---|---|---|---|
| Spring Season | – | – | 8th | April 13, 2014 | June 7, 2014 |
| Fall Season | – | 9th | – | July 12, 2014 | November 2, 2014 |
| U.S. Open Cup | 3rd Round | – | Quarterfinals | May 28, 2014 | July 9, 2014 |
| NASL Playoffs | – | – | – | – | – |

=== NASL ===
==== Spring season ====
===== Table =====
| Pos | Team | Pld | W | D | L | GF | GA | GD | Pts | Qualification |
|---|---|---|---|---|---|---|---|---|---|---|
| 1 | Minnesota United (S) | 9 | 6 | 2 | 1 | 16 | 9 | +7 | 20 | Playoffs |
| 2 | New York Cosmos | 9 | 6 | 1 | 2 | 14 | 3 | +11 | 19 | |
| 3 | San Antonio Scorpions | 9 | 5 | 2 | 2 | 13 | 9 | +4 | 17 | |
| 4 | Carolina RailHawks | 9 | 4 | 2 | 3 | 11 | 15 | −4 | 14 | |
| 5 | Fort Lauderdale Strikers | 9 | 4 | 1 | 4 | 18 | 18 | 0 | 13 | |
| 6 | Ottawa Fury | 9 | 3 | 1 | 5 | 14 | 13 | +1 | 10 | |
| 7 | Tampa Bay Rowdies | 9 | 2 | 4 | 3 | 11 | 16 | −5 | 10 | |
| 8 | Atlanta Silverbacks | 9 | 3 | 1 | 5 | 12 | 20 | −8 | 10 | |
| 9 | FC Edmonton | 9 | 2 | 2 | 5 | 11 | 11 | 0 | 8 | |
| 10 | Indy Eleven | 9 | 0 | 4 | 5 | 14 | 20 | −6 | 4 | |

Source: NASL Standings
(S) Spring season champion

===== Results summary =====
| Overall | | | | | | | | Home | | | | | | Away | | | | | |
| Pld | W | D | L | GF | GA | GD | Pts | W | D | L | GF | GA | GD | W | D | L | GF | GA | GD |
|---|---|---|---|---|---|---|---|---|---|---|---|---|---|---|---|---|---|---|---|
| 9 | 3 | 1 | 5 | 12 | 20 | −8 | 10 | 1 | 1 | 2 | 7 | 8 | −1 | 2 | 0 | 3 | 5 | 12 | −7 |

Last updated: June 7, 2014.

===== Results by round =====
| Round | 1 | 2 | 3 | 4 | 5 | 6 | 7 | 8 | 9 |
|---|---|---|---|---|---|---|---|---|---|
| Ground | A | H | A | H | A | A | A | H | H |
| Result | L | L | W | W | L | L | W | L | D |
| Position | 10 | 10 | 7 | 6 | 7 | 8 | 7 | 8 | 8 |

Updated to match(es) played on June 7, 2014. Source: Spring season 2014 results
A = Away; H = Home; W = Win; D = Draw; L = Loss

===== Match results =====
| April 13, 2014 1 | New York Cosmos | 4–0 | Atlanta Silverbacks | Hempstead, New York |
| 5:00 PM EDT | Maurer (yellow card) 12'; Mendes 23', 38'; Ayoze 32' (yellow card) 45'; Stokkelien 72'; Szetela (yellow card) 81' | Report | Gonzalez (yellow card) 22'; Paulini (yellow card) 62' | Stadium: Shuart Stadium; Attendance: 7,906; Referee: Jorge Gonzalez |

| April 19, 2014 2 | Atlanta Silverbacks | 1–2 | San Antonio Scorpions | Chamblee, Georgia |
| 7:30 PM EDT | McCaulay (yellow card) 26'; Rivera (yellow card) 40'; Sandoval 82' | Report | Hassli (yellow card) 19'; Janicki 34'; Saiko 46'; Barrera (yellow card) 82' | Stadium: Silverbacks Park; Attendance: 5,000; Referee: Fotis Bazakos |

| April 26, 2014 3 | Tampa Bay Rowdies | 1–3 | Atlanta Silverbacks | St. Petersburg, Florida |
| 7:30 PM EDT | Hristov 15'; Russell (yellow card) 90' | Report | Sandoval 7'; Chávez 27' (yellow card) 90'; McCaulay 51'; Gonzalez (yellow card) 61'; Estrada (yellow card) 90' | Stadium: Al Lang Stadium; Attendance: 4,670; Referee: Mark Kadlecik |

| May 3, 2014 4 | Atlanta Silverbacks | 2–1 | Ottawa Fury FC | Chamblee, Georgia |
| 7:30 PM EDT | McCaulay 44'; Chávez 50'; Ati (yellow card) 82'; Sousa (yellow card) 89' | Report | Elias (yellow card) 22'; Jarun 90+5' | Stadium: Silverbacks Park; Attendance: 3,922; Referee: Chris Penso |

| May 10, 2014 5 | Fort Lauderdale Strikers | 4–0 | Atlanta Silverbacks | Fort Lauderdale, Florida |
| 7:30 PM EDT | Antonijevic (yellow card) 20'; Núñez 23'; Anderson 50'; Chavez (yellow card) 60'; Ebbers (yellow card) 77'; Salazar 84'; Picault 90+1' (pen.) | Report | Gavin (yellow card) 42'; Gonzalez (yellow card) 42'; Harlley (red card) 73'; Reiss (yellow card) 83'; Chávez (yellow card) 90' | Stadium: Lockhart Stadium; Attendance: 3,109; Referee: Alan Kelly |

| May 17, 2014 6 | Carolina RailHawks | 2–0 | Atlanta Silverbacks | Cary, North Carolina |
| 7:30 PM EDT | Grella 16' (pen.); Tobin 36'; Ståhl (yellow card) 86' | Report | Reiss (yellow card) 46'; Canovas (yellow card) 76' | Stadium: WakeMed Park; Attendance: 5,527; Referee: M. DeOliveira |

| May 24, 2014 7 | FC Edmonton | 1–2 | Atlanta Silverbacks | Edmonton |
| 9:00 PM EDT | James 75' | Report | Randolph (yellow card) 38'; Chávez 49'; Canovas (yellow card) 73'; Poku 80'; Carrillo (yellow card) 90+1' | Stadium: Clarke Stadium; Attendance: 2,961; Referee: Robert Schaap |

| May 31, 2014 8 | Atlanta Silverbacks | 1–2 | Minnesota United FC | Chamblee, Georgia |
| 7:30 PM EDT | Chávez (yellow card) 54'; Poku 85' | Report | Davis (yellow card) 36'; Jordan 52'; Ramirez 74' | Stadium: Silverbacks Park; Attendance: 5,000; Referee: A. Pfefferkorn |

| June 7, 2014 9 | Atlanta Silverbacks | 3–3 | Indy Eleven | Chamblee, Georgia |
| 7:30 PM EDT | Chavez 12' (pen.), 45+1' (pen.); Cruz 15' (yellow card) 57'; Garcia (yellow card) 45'; Roushandel (yellow card) 88'; Reiss (yellow card) 90' | Report | Ambersley 13', 58' (pen.); Smith (yellow card) 45'; Estridge (yellow card) 62'; Okiomah (red card) 65'; Kléberson 88' (pen.) | Stadium: Silverbacks Park; Attendance: 5,000; Referee: Alan Kelly |

==== Fall season ====
===== Table =====
| Pos | Team | Pld | W | D | L | GF | GA | GD | Pts | Qualification |
|---|---|---|---|---|---|---|---|---|---|---|
| 1 | San Antonio Scorpions (F) | 18 | 11 | 2 | 5 | 30 | 15 | +15 | 35 | Playoffs |
| 2 | Minnesota United | 18 | 10 | 5 | 3 | 31 | 19 | +12 | 35 | |
| 3 | FC Edmonton | 18 | 8 | 5 | 5 | 23 | 18 | +5 | 29 | |
| 4 | Fort Lauderdale Strikers | 18 | 7 | 6 | 5 | 20 | 21 | −1 | 27 | |
| 5 | Carolina RailHawks | 18 | 7 | 3 | 8 | 27 | 28 | −1 | 24 | |
| 6 | New York Cosmos | 18 | 5 | 8 | 5 | 23 | 24 | −1 | 23 | |
| 7 | Indy Eleven | 18 | 6 | 5 | 7 | 21 | 26 | −5 | 23 | |
| 8 | Tampa Bay Rowdies | 18 | 5 | 5 | 8 | 25 | 34 | −9 | 20 | |
| 9 | Ottawa Fury | 18 | 4 | 5 | 9 | 20 | 25 | −5 | 17 | |
| 10 | Atlanta Silverbacks | 18 | 3 | 4 | 11 | 20 | 30 | −10 | 13 | |

Source: NASL Standings
(F) Fall season champion

===== Results summary =====
| Overall | | | | | | | | Home | | | | | | Away | | | | | |
| Pld | W | D | L | GF | GA | GD | Pts | W | D | L | GF | GA | GD | W | D | L | GF | GA | GD |
|---|---|---|---|---|---|---|---|---|---|---|---|---|---|---|---|---|---|---|---|
| 18 | 3 | 4 | 11 | 20 | 28 | −8 | 13 | 1 | 3 | 5 | 7 | 12 | −5 | 2 | 1 | 6 | 13 | 16 | −3 |

Source: Fall season 2014 results

===== Results by round =====
| Round | 1 | 2 | 3 | 4 | 5 | 6 | 7 | 8 | 9 | 10 | 11 | 12 | 13 | 14 | 15 | 16 | 17 | 18 |
|---|---|---|---|---|---|---|---|---|---|---|---|---|---|---|---|---|---|---|
| Ground | A | H | H | A | H | A | A | A | H | A | H | H | A | A | H | H | H | A |
| Result | L | W | D | W | L | D | L | W | L | L | L | L | L | L | D | D | L | L |
| Position | 7 | 5 | 5 | 3 | 6 | 5 | 8 | 5 | 8 | 9 | | | | | | | | 10 |

Updated to match(es) played on August 2014. Source: Fall season 2014 results
A = Away; H = Home; W = Win; D = Draw; L = Loss

===== Match results =====
| July 12, 2014 1 | Tampa Bay Rowdies | 3–2 | Atlanta Silverbacks | St. Petersburg, Florida |
| 7:30 PM EDT | Wallace (yellow card) 20'; Hristov (yellow card) 23' (goal) 66', 90+2'; Townsend 58'; Russell (yellow card) 70' | Report | Carr (yellow card) 20'; Burgos 27'; Bangura (yellow card) 35'; McCaulay 42'; Sandoval (yellow card) 70' | Stadium: Al Lang Stadium; Attendance: 3,896; Referee: Mark Kadlecik |

| July 19, 2014 2 | Atlanta Silverbacks | 1–0 | FC Edmonton | Chamblee, Georgia |
| 7:30 PM EDT | Gavin (yellow card) 72'; Cruz 75' (yellow card) 76'; Chavez (yellow card) 87' | Report | Moses (yellow card) 42'; Jonke (yellow card) 47'; Raudales (yellow card) 54'; Watson (yellow card) 74' | Stadium: Silverbacks Park; Attendance: 3,011; Referee: Marcos de Oliveira |

| July 26, 2014 3 | Atlanta Silverbacks | 1–1 | Minnesota United FC | Chamblee, Georgia |
| 7:30 PM EDT | Gavin (yellow card) 55'; Sandoval (yellow card) 74'; Chavez 90+1' (pen.) | Report | Pitchkolan (yellow card) 39'; Ramirez 47'; Mendes (yellow card) 90' | Stadium: Silverbacks Park; Attendance: 4,810; Referee: Chris Penso |

| August 2, 2014 4 | Indy Eleven | 2–4 | Atlanta Silverbacks | Indianapolis, Indiana |
| 7:30 PM EDT | Kléberson 43' (pen.), 55' (pen.); Smart (yellow card) 48'; Peña (red card) 65' | Report | Burgos 5'; Cruz 21'; Canovas (yellow card) 39'; Chavez 46'; Nasco (yellow card) 54'; Randolph (yellow card) 68'; Sandoval 83' | Stadium: M. Carroll Stadium; Attendance: 10,285; Referee: Robert Sibiga |

| August 9, 2014 5 | Atlanta Silverbacks | 1–2 | New York Cosmos | Chamblee, Georgia |
| 7:30 PM EDT | Burgos 12'; Poku (yellow card) 17'; Sandoval (red card) 41'; Cruz (yellow card) 41'; Gonzalez (yellow card) 85' | Report | Flores (yellow card) 37' (goal) 45+1'; Senna 61'; Nane (yellow card) 71'; Stokkelien (yellow card) 80' | Stadium: Silverbacks Park; Attendance: 3,842; Referee: Mark Kadlecik |

| August 16, 2014 6 | Fort Lauderdale Strikers | 1–1 | Atlanta Silverbacks | Fort Lauderdale, Florida |
| 7:30 PM EDT | King (yellow card) 45'; Picault 62'; Ramírez (red card) 90' | Report | Espinoza (yellow card) 6'; Chavez 7'; Cruz (yellow card) 90' | Stadium: Lockhart Stadium; Attendance: 2,409; Referee: Daniel Fitzgerald |

| August 23, 2014 7 | San Antonio Scorpions | 2–1 | Atlanta Silverbacks | San Antonio, Texas |
| 8:30 PM EDT | Elizondo 49'; Menjivar (yellow card) 57'; Restrepo 77' (pen.) | Report | Sandoval 80' (yellow card) 80' | Stadium: Toyota Field; Attendance: 5,734; Referee: Marcos DeOliveira |

| August 30, 2014 8 | Carolina RailHawks | 0–2 | Atlanta Silverbacks | Cary, North Carolina |
| 7:30 PM EDT | | Report | Espinoza (yellow card) 55'; Sandoval 63'; Roushandel 75' | Stadium: WakeMed Park; Attendance: 3,106; Referee: Mark Kadlecik |

| September 6, 2014 9 | Atlanta Silverbacks | 1–2 | Indy Eleven | Chamblee, Georgia |
| 7:30 PM EDT | Gavin 45'; Poku (yellow card) 47' | Report | Johnson 15'; Smith 37'; Pineda (yellow card) 59'; Ambersley (yellow card) 62'; Frías (yellow card) 77' | Stadium: Silverbacks Park; Attendance: 5,000; Referee: Robert Sibiga |

| September 13, 2014 10 | New York Cosmos | 3–2 | Atlanta Silverbacks | Hempstead, New York |
| 7:00 PM EDT | Stokkelien 1'; Guenzatti 9'; Diosa (yellow card) 42'; Szetela 84' | Report | Sousa (yellow card) 8'; Sandoval 16' (yellow card) 86'; Rivera (yellow card) 34'; Gonzalez (yellow card) 37'; Cruz 59' | Stadium: Shuart Stadium; Attendance: 4,502; Referee: Robert Sibiga |

| September 20, 2014 11 | Atlanta Silverbacks | 0–3 | Ottawa Fury FC | Chamblee, Georgia |
| 7:30 PM EDT | Chavez (yellow card) 59'; Cruz (red card) 79' | Report | Mayard 3'; Heinemann (yellow card) 25'; Oliver 38' (yellow card) 44'; Trafford (yellow card) 55'; Beckie (yellow card) 59'; Ryan (yellow card) 65'; Patterson (yellow card) 80'; Haworth 83' | Stadium: Silverbacks Park; Attendance: 3,071; Referee: Kevin Terry, Jr. |

| September 27, 2014 12 | Atlanta Silverbacks | 0–1 | San Antonio Scorpions | Chamblee, Georgia |
| 7:30 PM EDT | | Report | Castillo (yellow card) 33'; Elizondo 49'; Restrepo (yellow card) 79' | Stadium: Silverbacks Park; Attendance: 3,062; Referee: Robert Sibiga |

| October 1, 2014 13 | Ottawa Fury FC | 2–0 | Atlanta Silverbacks | Ottawa, Ontario |
| 7:00 PM EDT | Dantas 21' (yellow card) 40'; Paterson 34' | Report | Chavez (yellow card) 14'; Burgos (red card) 89' | Stadium: TD Place Stadium; Attendance: 3,105; Referee: Yusri Rudolf |

| October 4, 2014 14 | Minnesota United FC | 1–0 | Atlanta Silverbacks | Blaine, Minnesota |
| 8:00 PM EDT | Pitchkolan (yellow card) 43'; Ramirez 58' | Report | Gavin (yellow card) 30'; Espinoza (yellow card) 49'; Rivera (yellow card) 90' | Stadium: National Sports Center; Attendance: 5,744; Referee: Fotis Bazakos |

| October 11, 2014 15 | Atlanta Silverbacks | 2–2 | Fort Lauderdale Strikers | Chamblee, Georgia |
| 7:30 PM EDT | Sandoval 47'; Alves 89' (o.g.); Roushandel (yellow card) 94' | Report | Hassan 25'; King (yellow card) 41'; Picault 79' | Stadium: Silverbacks Park; Attendance: 2,905; Referee: Mark Kadlecik |

| October 18, 2014 16 | Atlanta Silverbacks | 1–1 | Tampa Bay Rowdies | Chamblee, Georgia |
| 7:30 PM EDT | Chavez 54'; McCaulay (yellow card) 87' | Report | Hristov (yellow card) 30', (goal) 38' | Stadium: Silverbacks Park; Attendance: 3,061; Referee: Robert Sibiga |

| October 25, 2014 17 | Atlanta Silverbacks | 0–2 | Carolina RailHawks | Chamblee, Georgia |
| 6:30 PM EDT | Chavez (yellow card) 51' | Summary | Sandoval 37'; Novo 48' (pen.) | Stadium: Silverbacks Park; Attendance: 5,000; Referee: (United States) Daniel Fitzgerald |

| November 2, 2014 18 | FC Edmonton | 2–1 | Atlanta Silverbacks | Edmonton |
| 4:00 PM EST | Ameobi 17'; Nonni 34' | Summary | Bangura 71' | Stadium: Clarke Stadium; Attendance: 3,085; Referee: (United States) Yusri Rudolf |

=== US Open Cup ===
| May 28, 2014 Third Round | Chattanooga FC | 0–5 | Atlanta Silverbacks | Chattanooga, Tennessee |
| 7:30 PM EDT | Dunstan (yellow card) 14' (yellow-red card) 90'; Reakes (yellow card) 53' | Report | Sandoval 12'; Burgos 15', 43'; Poku (yellow card) 53'; McCaulay 68'; Chavez 71' | Stadium: Finley Stadium; Attendance: 4,058; Referee: Kevin Terry Jr. |

| June 14, 2014 Fourth Round | Atlanta Silverbacks | 2–1 | Real Salt Lake | Chamblee, Georgia |
| 8:00 PM EDT | Burgos 33' (yellow card) 55'; Gavin (yellow card) 44'; Poku 90+2' | Report | Findley 10'; Maund (yellow card) 27'; Salcedo (yellow card) 65' | Stadium: Silverbacks Park; Attendance: 5,000; Referee: A. Villarreal |

| June 24, 2014 Fifth Round | Colorado Rapids | 1–2 | Atlanta Silverbacks | Commerce City, Colorado |
| 9:00 PM EDT | Burch (red card) 62'; Powers 75' (pen.); Piermayr (yellow card) 90+9' | Report | Chavez 21', 57' (red card) 62'; Poku (red card) 62'; Carr (red card) 65'; Harlley (yellow card) 77'; Sandoval (yellow card) 83' | Stadium: Dick's SG Park; Attendance: 1,654; Referee: Juan Guzman |

| July 9, 2014 Quarterfinals | Atlanta Silverbacks | 1–3 | Chicago Fire | Chamblee, Georgia |
| 7:30 PM EDT | Gonzalez (red card) 31'; Sousa (yellow card) 43'; McCaulay 54'; Canovas (yellow card) 61' | Report | Magee (red card) 31'; Watson (yellow card) 34'; Amarikwa 50'; Larentowicz 82' (pen.); Alex 85'; Soumaré (yellow card) 86'; Hurtado (yellow card) 90' | Stadium: Silverbacks Park; Attendance: 5,327; Referee: Edvin Jurisevic |

== Playoffs ==
The Championship will be contested by the winners of the spring and fall seasons hosting the next best two teams in the full year regular season table. The semi-finals will take place on November 8 and 9, with the two winners of the two games playing in the Championship game hosted by the team with the best overall regular season record, on November 15.

== Statistics ==
=== Appearances ===
Numbers in parentheses denote appearances as substitute.
Players with no appearances not included in the list.

Last updated on October 1, 2014

| No. | Pos. | Nat. | Name | Spring | Fall | Open Cup | Total |
| No. | Pos. | Nat. | Name | Apps | Apps | Apps | Apps |
|---|---|---|---|---|---|---|---|
| 2 | DF | USA | Edgar Espinoza | 6 | 8 | 0 | 14 |
| 5 | MF | USA | Blair Gavin | 6 | 12 | 4 | 22 |
| 7 | MF | HON | Junior Sandoval | 8 | 12 | 4 | 24 |
| 8 | DF | ARG | Ramiro Canovas | 2 (1) | 6 (4) | 3 | 11 (5) |
| 9 | FW | BLZ | Deon McCaulay | 8 (1) | 2 (2) | 2 (2) | 12 (5) |
| 10 | MF | GHA | Kwadwo Poku | 6 (3) | 11 (2) | 3 | 20 (5) |
| 11 | MF | USA | Pablo Cruz | 3 (3) | 10 (1) | 3 | 16 (4) |
| 12 | GK | USA | Thomas Hunter | 0 (1) | 0 | 0 | 0 (1) |
| 13 | MF | LBR | Borfor Carr | 1 (1) | 6 (2) | 2 (1) | 9 (4) |
| 14 | MF | ARG | Lucas Paulini | 1 (1) | 4 (4) | 0 | 5 (5) |
| 15 | DF | SLE | Abdul Bangura | 2 (1) | 3 | 0 (1) | 5 (2) |
| 16 | GK | CMR | Eric Ati | 6 (1) | 8 | 1 | 15 (1) |
| 18 | MF | USA | Mitch Garcia | 1 | 1 | 0 (1) | 2 (1) |
| 19 | FW | USA | Jaime Chavez | 6 (3) | 13 | 3 | 22 (3) |
| 20 | MF | COL | Janny Rivera | 2 (1) | 3 (1) | 0 | 5 (2) |
| 21 | FW | USA | Kellen Gulley | 0 | 0 (2) | 0 (1) | 0 (3) |
| 25 | MF | COD | Ferrety Sousa | 0 (1) | 3 (3) | 1 | 4 (4) |
| 29 | DF | USA | Mike Randolph | 8 | 9 | 4 | 21 |
| 33 | MF | SLV | Junior Burgos | 3 (3) | 7 (2) | 4 | 14 (5) |
| 38 | DF | USA | Ryan Roushandel | 7 (1) | 12 | 1 | 20 (1) |
| 45 | MF | TOG | Alex Harlley | 1 (2) | 4 (8) | 0 (4) | 5 (14) |
| 70 | MF | USA | Jesus Gonzalez | 6 (1) | 4 (7) | 1 (2) | 11 (10) |
| 99 | FW | SLE | Shaka Bangura | 0 | 0 (1) | 0 | 0 (1) |
Players below are no longer on roster
| 3 | MF | USA | David Estrada | 2 (1) | - | - | 2 (1) |
| 4 | DF | USA | Bobby Reiss | 8 | - | 2 | 10 |
| 6 | DF | USA | Beto Navarro | 3 | - | 3 | 6 |
| 22 | GK | SLV | Derby Carrillo | 3 | 1 | 3 | 7 |
| 23 | GK | USA | Joe Nasco | 0 | 4 | 0 | 4 |

=== Goalscorers ===
This includes all competitive matches.

Last updated on September 20, 2014

| Rank | No. | Pos. | Name | Spring | Fall | Open Cup | Total |
|---|---|---|---|---|---|---|---|
| 1 | 19 | FW | Jaime Chavez | 5 | 3 | 3 | 11 |
| 2 | 7 | MF | Junior Sandoval | 2 | 4 | 1 | 7 |
| 3 | 33 | MF | Junior Burgos | 0 | 3 | 3 | 6 |
| 4 | 9 | FW | Deon McCaulay | 2 | 1 | 2 | 5 |
| 5 | 11 | MF | Pablo Cruz | 1 | 3 | 0 | 4 |
| 6 | 10 | MF | Kwadwo Poku | 2 | 0 | 1 | 3 |
| 7 | 5 | MF | Blair Gavin | 0 | 1 | 0 | 1 |
| 7 | 38 | DF | Ryan Roushandel | 0 | 1 | 0 | 1 |
| TOTALS | | | | 12 | 16 | 10 | 38 |

=== Clean sheets ===
This includes all competitive matches.

Last updated on September 20, 2014

| Rank | No. | Pos. | Name | Spring | Fall | Open Cup | Total |
|---|---|---|---|---|---|---|---|
| 1 | 16 | GK | Eric Ati | 0 | 1 | 1 | 2 |
| 2 | 23 | GK | Joe Nasco | 0 | 1 | 0 | 1 |
| 3 | 12 | GK | Thomas Hunter | 0 | 0 | 0 | 0 |
| TOTALS | | | | 0 | 2 | 1 | 3 |

=== Disciplinary record ===
This includes all competitive matches.

Last updated on October 1, 2014

| No. | Pos. | Player | Spring | | Fall | | Open Cup | | Total | |
| No. | Pos. | Player | Yellow card | Red card | Yellow card | Red card | Yellow card | Red card | Yellow card | Red card |
| 2 | DF | Edgar Espinoza | 0 | 0 | 2 | 0 | 0 | 0 | 2 | 0 |
| 5 | MF | Blair Gavin | 1 | 0 | 2 | 0 | 1 | 0 | 4 | 0 |
| 7 | MF | Junior Sandoval | 0 | 0 | 4 | 1 | 1 | 0 | 5 | 1 |
| 8 | DF | Ramiro Canovas | 2 | 0 | 1 | 0 | 1 | 0 | 4 | 0 |
| 9 | FW | Deon McCaulay | 1 | 0 | 0 | 0 | 0 | 0 | 1 | 0 |
| 10 | MF | Kwadwo Poku | 0 | 0 | 2 | 0 | 1 | 1 | 3 | 1 |
| 11 | MF | Pablo Cruz | 1 | 0 | 3 | 1 | 0 | 0 | 4 | 1 |
| 13 | MF | Borfor Carr | 0 | 0 | 1 | 0 | 0 | 1 | 1 | 1 |
| 14 | MF | Lucas Paulini | 1 | 0 | 0 | 0 | 0 | 0 | 1 | 0 |
| 15 | DF | Abdul Bangura | 0 | 0 | 1 | 0 | 0 | 0 | 1 | 0 |
| 16 | GK | Eric Ati | 1 | 0 | 0 | 0 | 0 | 0 | 1 | 0 |
| 18 | MF | Mitch Garcia | 1 | 0 | 0 | 0 | 0 | 0 | 1 | 0 |
| 19 | FW | Jaime Chavez | 3 | 0 | 3 | 0 | 0 | 1 | 6 | 1 |
| 20 | MF | Janny Rivera | 1 | 0 | 1 | 0 | 0 | 0 | 2 | 0 |
| 25 | MF | Ferrety Sousa | 1 | 0 | 1 | 0 | 1 | 0 | 3 | 0 |
| 29 | DF | Mike Randolph | 1 | 0 | 1 | 0 | 0 | 0 | 2 | 0 |
| 33 | MF | Junior Burgos | 0 | 0 | 0 | 1 | 1 | 0 | 1 | 1 |
| 38 | DF | Ryan Roushandel | 1 | 0 | 0 | 0 | 0 | 0 | 1 | 0 |
| 45 | MF | Alex Harlley | 0 | 1 | 0 | 0 | 1 | 0 | 1 | 1 |
| 70 | MF | Jesus Gonzalez | 3 | 0 | 2 | 0 | 0 | 1 | 5 | 1 |
Players below are no longer on roster
| 3 | FW | David Estrada | 1 | 0 | - | - | - | - | 1 | 0 |
| 4 | DF | Bobby Reiss | 3 | 0 | - | - | 0 | 0 | 3 | 0 |
| 22 | GK | Derby Carrillo | 1 | 0 | 0 | 0 | 0 | 0 | 1 | 0 |
| 23 | GK | Joe Nasco | 0 | 0 | 1 | 0 | 0 | 0 | 1 | 0 |
| TOTALS | | | 23 | 1 | 24 | 2 | 7 | 4 | 53 | 8 |

== See also ==
- 2014 in American soccer
- 2014 North American Soccer League season
- Atlanta Silverbacks
