= 2014 Tampa Bay Rowdies season =

Tampa Bay Rowdies
2014 season
- Owners: Bill Edwards (Majority); Andrew Nestor (Minority); David Laxer (Minority)
- Head Coach: Ricky Hill
- Stadium: Al Lang Field
- NASL: Spring: 7th place Fall: 8th place
- NASL Playoffs: did not qualify
- U.S. Open Cup: Third round
- Top goalscorer: League: Georgi Hristov (9); All: Georgi Hristov (12)
- Highest home attendance: 7,003 (April 12 v. Edmonton)
- Lowest home attendance: 2,565 (October 15 v. Minnesota)
- Average home league attendance: League: 4,409; All: 4,297
Home colors	Away colors	Third colors

The 2014 season was the current Tampa Bay Rowdies fifth season of existence, and fourth playing in the North American Soccer League, the second tier of American soccer pyramid. Including the original Rowdies franchise and the Tampa Bay Mutiny, this was the 27th season of a professional soccer team fielded in the Tampa Bay region.

== Club ==
as of October 20, 2014

No.	Position	Nation	Player
1	GK	USA	Cody Mizell
3	DF	USA	Willie Hunt
4	MF	USA	Kyle Clinton
5	DF	GUY	J. P. Rodrigues
7	DF	USA	Frank Sanfilippo (captain)
8	MF	ENG	Darel Russell
9	FW	USA	Devin Del Dó
10	FW	BUL	Georgi Hristov
11	MF	ENG	Shane Hill
13	DF	USA	Anthony Wallace
14	DF	USA	Jordan Gafa
15	FW	USA	Casey Townsend
16	FW	JAM	Amani Walker
17	FW	ZIM	Lucky Mkosana
18	GK	USA	Matt Pickens
19	DF	USA	Blake Wagner
20	MF	GHA	Evans Frimpong
21	FW	USA	Brian Shriver
22	MF	USA	Keith Savage
23	MF	JAM	Ricardo Morris
24	GK	USA	Diego Restrepo
25	FW	GUY	Carl Cort
27	DF	ENG	Tamika Mkandawire
32	DF	JPN	Takuya Yamada
33	DF	USA	Jay Needham
35	FW	ARG	Luciano Olguín
81	FW	USA	Corey Hertzog
99	GK	JAM	Ryan Thompson

=== Team management ===
- (United States) Perry Van der Beck – Executive Vice President, General Manager, Technical Director, and Director of Player Development
- (United States) Lee Cohen – Director of Operations
- (England) Ricky Hill – Head Coach
- (Bosnia and Herzegovina) Slobodan Janjuš – Goalkeeper Coach
- (United States) James Faylo – Head Athletic Trainer
- (United States) Ryan Spurr – Team Operations Manager
- (United States) Patrick Horan – Team Physician

== Competitions ==
Win Tie Loss

=== Friendlies ===
March 1, 2014 Preseason	South Florida Bulls	2–2	Tampa Bay Rowdies	Tampa, Florida
7:00 p.m. EDT	Muckett (yellow card) 15'; Baldin 69' (pen.); Charpie 71'	Report	Savage (yellow card) 19'; Cort 35'; Yamada (yellow card) 48'; Frimpong 76'; Shriver (yellow card) 78'	Stadium: Corbett Soccer Stadium; Attendance: 1,845

March 8, 2014 Preseason	Tampa Spartans	0–3	Tampa Bay Rowdies	Tampa, Florida
7:30 p.m. EST		Report 1 Report 2	Savage 3'; Hristov 24'; Del Do 63'	Stadium: Pepin Stadium

March 15, 2014 Preseason	Tampa Bay Rowdies	3–1	FGCU Eagles	St. Petersburg, Florida
7:00 p.m. EDT	Russell 18', 24'; Shriver 80'	Report 1 Report 2	Madrid 39'	Stadium: Walter Fuller Complex

March 22, 2014 Preseason	Tampa Marauders	2–4	Tampa Bay Rowdies	Tampa, Florida
7:30 p.m. EDT	Escayg 22'; King 47'; Ababio (yellow card) 54'	Report	Frimpong 26'; Hunt 50'; Shriver 55'; Clinton 80'	Stadium: Naimoli Stadium

March 29, 2014 Preseason	Saint Leo Lions	canceled	Tampa Bay Rowdies	New Port Richey, Florida
7:00 p.m. EDT		Report		Stadium: Mitchell Fields

March 31, 2014 Preseason	Tampa Bay Rowdies (United States)	1–1	(Iceland) Valur	Bradenton, Florida
7:30 p.m. EDT	Nielsen 45' (o.g.); Russell (yellow card) 63'; Lewis (yellow card) 77'	Report	Hurst (yellow card) 13'; Lúðvíksson 77' (pen.)	Stadium: IMG Academy Stadium

April 30, 2014 I-4 Derby: Leg 1	Orlando City Soccer Club	3–0	Tampa Bay Rowdies	Lake Buena Vista, Florida
7:30 EDT	Mbengue 27'; Chin 44'; Span 90+2'	Report 1 Report 2	Hunt (yellow card) 45'; Yamada (yellow card) 77'	Stadium: ESPN Wide World of Sports Complex

June 3, 2014 Closed-Door Friendly	Tampa Bay Rowdies (United States)	1–3	Costa Rica	Bradenton, Florida
1:30 p.m. EDT	Mkosana	Report		Stadium: IMG Academy

July 4, 2014 Friendly	Tampa Bay Rowdies	3–1	Fort Lauderdale Strikers	St. Petersburg, Florida
6:30 p.m. EDT	Townsend 20'; Olguín 88'; Walker 89'	Report 1 Report 2	Gonzalez 36'	Stadium: Al Lang Field; Attendance: 4,105

July 6, 2014 I-4 Derby: Leg 2	Tampa Bay Rowdies	2–3	Orlando City Soccer Club	St. Petersburg, Florida
EDT	Hristov 35', 59'; Yamada (yellow card) 43'; Thompson (yellow card) 45'	Report 1 Report 2	Molino 32'; Cerén 43'; Boden (yellow card) 63'; Hertzog 75'	Stadium: Al Lang Field; Attendance: 3,033

=== NASL Spring season ===
==== Standings ====
Pos	Team	Pld	W	D	L	GF	GA	GD	Pts	Qualification
1	Minnesota United (S)	9	6	2	1	16	9	+7	20	Playoffs
2	New York Cosmos	9	6	1	2	14	3	+11	19	
3	San Antonio Scorpions	9	5	2	2	13	9	+4	17	
4	Carolina RailHawks	9	4	2	3	11	15	−4	14	
5	Fort Lauderdale Strikers	9	4	1	4	18	18	0	13	
6	Ottawa Fury	9	3	1	5	14	13	+1	10	
7	Tampa Bay Rowdies	9	2	4	3	11	16	−5	10	
8	Atlanta Silverbacks	9	3	1	5	12	20	−8	10	
9	FC Edmonton	9	2	2	5	11	11	0	8	
10	Indy Eleven	9	0	4	5	14	20	−6	4	

Source: NASL Standings
(S) Spring season champion

==== Results summary ====
Overall								Home						Away					
Pld	W	D	L	GF	GA	GD	Pts	W	D	L	GF	GA	GD	W	D	L	GF	GA	GD
9	2	4	3	11	16	−5	10	1	2	2	8	12	−4	1	2	1	3	4	−1

Last updated: July 5, 2014.
Source: Match reports

==== Results by round ====
Round	1	2	3	4	5	6	7	8	9
Ground	H	A	H	A	A	H	H	A	H
Result	D	D	L	W	D	L	W	L	D

Updated to match(es) played on May 26, 2014. Source: Match reports
A = Away; H = Home; W = Win; D = Draw; L = Loss

==== Match reports ====
April 12, 2014 Match 1	Tampa Bay Rowdies	1–1	FC Edmonton	St. Petersburg, Florida
7:30 p.m. EDT	Russell (yellow card) 18'; Moses 32' (o.g.); Shriver (yellow card) 77'	Report 1 Report 2	Watson (yellow card) 61'; Robertrs (yellow card) 64'; Hlavaty (yellow card) 86'; Ameobi 88'	Stadium: Al Lang Stadium; Attendance: 7,003; Referee: Sorin Stoica

April 19, 2014 Match 2	Indy Eleven	1–1	Tampa Bay Rowdies	Indianapolis, Indiana
7:30 p.m. EDT	Norales 81'	Report 1 Report 2	Shriver 48'; Hristov (yellow card) 58'; Wagner (yellow card) 80'; Mkosana (yellow card) 88'	Stadium: Michael A. Carroll Stadium; Attendance: 10,421

April 26, 2014 Match 3	Tampa Bay Rowdies	1–3	Atlanta Silverbacks	St. Petersburg, Florida
7:30 p.m. EDT	Hristov 15'; Russell (yellow card) 90'	Report 1 Report 2	Sandoval 7'; Chavez 26', (yellow card) 90'; McCaulay 51'; Gonzalez (yellow card) 61'; Estrada (yellow card) 90'	Stadium: Al Lang Stadium; Attendance: 4,670; Referee: Mark Kadlecik

May 3, 2014 Match 4	San Antonio Scorpions	0–1	Tampa Bay Rowdies	San Antonio, Texas
7:30 p.m. EDT	Cann (yellow card) 35'; Touray (yellow card) 88'	Report 1 Report 2	Wagner (yellow card) 33' (yellow-red card) 77'; Hill 51'; Savage (yellow card) 57'; Pickens (yellow card) 84'	Stadium: Toyota Field; Attendance: 5,595; Referee: Ted Unkel

May 10, 2014 Match 5	Ottawa Fury FC	1–1	Tampa Bay Rowdies	Ottawa, Ontario
7:00 p.m. EDT	Jarun (yellow card) 26'; Beckie (yellow card) 26'; Donatelli 37'	Report1; Report 2	Hristov 27' (pen.)	Stadium: Keith Harris Stadium; Attendance: 2,164; Referee: Justin Tasev

May 17, 2014 Match 6	Tampa Bay Rowdies	0–3	New York Cosmos	St. Petersburg, Florida
7:30 p.m. EDT	Hristov (yellow card) 18'; Thompson (yellow card) 50'; Mkosana (yellow card) 74'	Report 1 Report 2	Mendes (yellow card) 37', (goal) 62'; Stokkelien 48'; Ayoze 51'; Dimitrov (yellow card) 86'	Stadium: Al Lang Stadium; Attendance: 4,855; Referee: Daniel Fitzgerald

May 24, 2014 Match 7 Coastal Cup	Tampa Bay Rowdies	3–2	Fort Lauderdale Strikers	St. Petersburg, Florida
7:30 p.m. EDT	Hunt 45', (yellow card) 49'; Wallace 62'; Wagner 90'	Report 1 Report 2	Anderson 19'; Chin 34'; Hall (yellow card) 35'; Salazar (yellow card) 35', (red card) 41'	Stadium: Al Lang Stadium; Attendance: 4,331; Referee: Robert Cibiga

May 31, 2014 Match 8	Carolina RailHawks	2–0	Tampa Bay Rowdies	Cary, North Carolina
7:30 p.m. EDT	Grella 18', (yellow card) 67'; Shipalane 72'; Scott (yellow card) 83'	Report 1 Report 2	Clinton (yellow card) 48'; Hunt (yellow card) 54'	Stadium: WakeMed Soccer Park; Attendance: 7,865; Referee: Alan Kelly

June 7, 2014 Match 9	Tampa Bay Rowdies	3–3	Minnesota United FC	St. Petersburg, Florida
7:30 p.m. EDT	Wagner 33'; Wallace (yellow card) 43'; Mkosana 45'; Sanfilippo 74'	Report 1 Report 2	Ramirez (yellow card) 9'; Davis 12'; Mendes 57'; Ibarra 61'	Stadium: Al Lang Stadium; Attendance: 4,132; Referee: Allen Chapman

=== NASL Fall season ===
==== Standings ====
Pos	Team	Pld	W	D	L	GF	GA	GD	Pts	Qualification
1	San Antonio Scorpions (F)	18	11	2	5	30	15	+15	35	Playoffs
2	Minnesota United	18	10	5	3	31	19	+12	35	
3	FC Edmonton	18	8	5	5	23	18	+5	29	
4	Fort Lauderdale Strikers	18	7	6	5	20	21	−1	27	
5	Carolina RailHawks	18	7	3	8	27	28	−1	24	
6	New York Cosmos	18	5	8	5	23	24	−1	23	
7	Indy Eleven	18	6	5	7	21	26	−5	23	
8	Tampa Bay Rowdies	18	5	5	8	25	34	−9	20	
9	Ottawa Fury	18	4	5	9	20	25	−5	17	
10	Atlanta Silverbacks	18	3	4	11	20	30	−10	13	

Source: NASL Standings
(F) Fall season champion

==== Results summary ====
Overall								Home						Away					
Pld	W	D	L	GF	GA	GD	Pts	W	D	L	GF	GA	GD	W	D	L	GF	GA	GD
18	5	5	8	25	34	−9	20	2	2	5	14	16	−2	3	3	3	11	18	−7

Last updated: April 26, 2018.
Source: Match reports

==== Results by round ====
Round	1	2	3	4	5	6	7	8	9	10	11	12	13	14	15	16	17	18
Ground	H	A	H	A	A	H	H	A	A	H	A	H	H	A	H	A	A	H
Result	W	W	L	L	W	W	L	W	D	L	L	L	D	L	L	D	D	D
Position	3	3	7	7	3	3	3											8

Updated to match(es) played on August 25, 2014. Source: Match reports
A = Away; H = Home; W = Win; D = Draw; L = Loss

==== Match reports ====
July 12, 2014 Match 1	Tampa Bay Rowdies	3–2	Atlanta Silverbacks	St. Petersburg, Florida
7:30 p.m. EDT	Wallace (yellow card) 20'; Hristov (yellow card) 23', (goal) 67', 90'; Townsend 58'; Russell (yellow card) 70'	Report 1 Report 2	Carr (yellow card) 20'; Burgos 27'; Bangura (yellow card) 35'; McCaulay 42'; Sandoval (yellow card) 70'	Stadium: Al Lang Stadium; Attendance: 3,896; Referee: Mark Kadlecik

July 19, 2014 Match 2	Indy Eleven	1–2	Tampa Bay Rowdies	Indianapolis, Indiana
7:30 p.m. EDT	Kléberson 38'	Report 1 Report 2	Townsend 43'; Hristov (yellow card) 45', (goal) 89'	Stadium: Michael A. Carroll Stadium; Attendance: 10,555; Referee: Hilario Grajedo

July 26, 2014 Match 3	Tampa Bay Rowdies	0–2	San Antonio Scorpions	St. Petersburg, Florida
7:30 p.m. EDT	Townsend (yellow card) 16'; Rodrigues (yellow card) 18'; Hristov (yellow card) 69'; Mkandawire (yellow card) 90'	Report	Zahorski 30' (yellow card) 63'; Caesar (yellow card) 52'; Janicki (yellow card) 81'; Touray 90'	Stadium: Al Lang Stadium; Attendance: 4,868; Referee: (United States) Fotis Bazakos

August 2, 2014 Match 4 Coastal Cup	Fort Lauderdale Strikers	1–0	Tampa Bay Rowdies	Fort Lauderdale, Florida
7:30 p.m. EDT	King (yellow card) 30'; Picault 72'	Report	Russell (yellow card) 68'	Stadium: Lockhart Stadium; Attendance: 2,648; Referee: (United States) Kevin Terry

August 9, 2014 Match 5	Carolina RailHawks	3–4	Tampa Bay Rowdies	Cary, North Carolina
7:30 p.m. EDT	Schilawski 48'; Martinez 51'; Scott (yellow card) 53', (red card) 87'; Rodrigues 86' (o.g.)	Report 1 Report 2	Walker 3'; Mkandawire 10'; Wallace (yellow card) 25'; Hristov (yellow card) 37'; Mkosana 77'; Russell 84', (yellow card) 87'	Stadium: WakeMed Soccer Park; Attendance: 3,140; Referee: Daniel Fitzgerald

August 16, 2014 Match 6	Tampa Bay Rowdies	3–1	New York Cosmos	St. Petersburg, Florida
7:30 p.m. EDT	Savage 22'; Russell (yellow card) 53'; Mkandawire 58'; Wagner 90'	Report 1 Report 2	Nane (yellow card) 72'; Flores (yellow card) 75'; Dimitrov 81'; Ayoze (yellow card) 87'	Stadium: Al Lang Stadium; Attendance: 4,273; Referee: Marcos DeOliveira

August 23, 2014 Match 7	Tampa Bay Rowdies	0–1	Carolina RailHawks	St. Petersburg, Florida
7:30 p.m. EDT		Report 1 Report 2	Osaki (yellow card) 71'; Barrera (yellow card) 86'; Shipalane 90+'	Stadium: Al Lang Stadium; Attendance: 4,212; Referee: Geoff Gamble

August 30, 2014 Match 8	Ottawa Fury FC	0–2	Tampa Bay Rowdies	Ottawa, Ontario
7:00 p.m. EDT	Davies (yellow card) 76', (red card) 84'; Eustaquio (yellow card) 79'	Report	Shriver 29'; Russell 41', (yellow card) 45'; Wallace (yellow card) 76'; Townsend (yellow card) 90'	Stadium: TD Place Stadium; Attendance: 4,206; Referee: Yusri Rudolf

September 6, 2014 Match 9	Minnesota United FC	1–1	Tampa Bay Rowdies	Blaine, Minnesota
7:00 p.m. EDT	Ramirez 14' (pen.)	Report	Hristov 70'	Stadium: National Sports Center; Attendance: 7,024; Referee: Marcos DeOliveira

September 13, 2014 Match 10	Tampa Bay Rowdies	0–2	Ottawa Fury FC	St. Petersburg, Florida
7:30 p.m. EDT	Wallace (yellow card) 67'	Report	Oliver 25', (yellow card) 67'; Ubiparipović (yellow card) 74', (goal) 90+'	Stadium: Al Lang Stadium; Attendance: 4,340; Referee: Rubiel Vazquez

September 21, 2014 Match 11	FC Edmonton	1–0	Tampa Bay Rowdies	Edmonton, Alberta
4:00 p.m. EDT	Laing 64'	Report		Stadium: Clarke Stadium; Attendance: 4,392; Referee: David Barrie

September 27, 2014 Match 12; Coastal Cup	Tampa Bay Rowdies	Postponed	Fort Lauderdale Strikers	St. Petersburg, Florida
7:30 p.m. EDT				Stadium: Al Lang Stadium

October 4, 2014 Match 13	Tampa Bay Rowdies	1–1	FC Edmonton	St. Petersburg, Florida
7:30 p.m. EDT	Pickens (yellow card) 63'; Russell (yellow card) 63'; Hristov 68' (pen.)	Report	Burt 43'; Edward (yellow card) 63' (yellow-red card) 90'	Stadium: Al Lang Stadium; Attendance: 4,313; Referee: Ted Unkel

October 8, 2014 Match 12; Coastal Cup	Tampa Bay Rowdies	2–3	Fort Lauderdale Strikers	St. Petersburg, Florida
7:30 p.m. EDT	Mkandawire 10'; Russell 38'; Frimpong (yellow card) 54'	Report	Picault 43', 44'; Chin 56'; Nurse (yellow card) 80'; Čontofalský (yellow card) 90'	Stadium: Al Lang Stadium; Attendance: 3,865; Referee: Alex Chilowicz

October 11, 2014 Match 14	San Antonio Scorpions	7–0	Tampa Bay Rowdies	San Antonio, Texas
7:00 p.m. EDT	Restrepo 27'; Castillo 42', 48'; Elizondo 53', 73'; Hassli 67', 77'	Report	Hill (yellow card) 41'; Mkandawire (red card) 46'; Frimpong (yellow card) 69'	Stadium: Toyota Field; Attendance: 5,683; Referee: Marcos DeOliveira

October 15, 2014 Match 15	Tampa Bay Rowdies	2–3	Minnesota United FC	St. Petersburg, Florida
7:30 p.m. EDT	Hristov 28'; Russell (yellow card) 48'; Townsend 90'	Report	Ramirez 44', 58'; Juliano 66'	Stadium: Al Lang Stadium; Attendance: 2,565; Referee: Rubiel Vazquez

October 18, 2014 Match 16	Atlanta Silverbacks	1–1	Tampa Bay Rowdies	Atlanta, Georgia
7:00 p.m. EDT	Gavin (yellow card) 8'; Chavez 54'; McCaulay (yellow card) 87'	Report	Hristov (yellow card) 29', (goal) 38'	Stadium: Atlanta Silverbacks Park; Attendance: 3,061; Referee: Robert Sibiga

October 25, 2014 Match 17	New York Cosmos	2–2	Tampa Bay Rowdies	Hempstead, New York
7:30 p.m. EDT	Chirishian 27'; Senna 49', (red card) 90+'; Freeman (yellow card) 59'; Gorskie (yellow card) 63'; Maurer (yellow card) 88'	Report	Frimpong 25', 90'; Olguín (yellow card) 59'; Wagner (yellow card) 76'; Russell (red card) 90+'	Stadium: James M. Shuart Stadium; Referee: Ted Unkel

November 1, 2014 Match 18	Tampa Bay Rowdies	2–2	Indy Eleven	St. Petersburg, Florida
7:30 p.m. EDT	Frimpong 17'; Walker 89'	Report	Miller (yellow card) 12'; Smart 47'; Jhulliam 88'	Stadium: Al Lang Stadium; Referee: Matthew Miscannon

=== U.S. Open Cup ===
May 28, 2014 Third round	Orlando City (Florida)	4–1	(Florida) Tampa Bay Rowdies	Sanford, Florida
8:00 pm EDT	Molino 11', 41' da Luz 22'; Mbengue 26'	Report	Wagner 45'; Hill (red card) 87'	Stadium: Seminole Soccer Complex; Attendance: 1,500; Referee: Ted Unkel

== Honors ==
- NASL Fair Play Award

== Transfers ==
=== In ===
Date	No.	Pos.	Player	Transferred from	Fee/notes	Source
December 20, 2013	19	DF	(United States) Blake Wagner	(United States) San Antonio Scorpions	Signed to a two-year contract, with a club option for a third year.	
December 20, 2013	24	GK	(United States) Diego Restrepo	(United States) Tampa Bay Rowdies	Re-signed to a two-year contract, with a club option for the second year.	
December 23, 2013	10	FW	(Bulgaria) Georgi Hristov	(United States) Tampa Bay Rowdies	Re-signed to a four-year contract, with a club option for the third and fourth year.	
December 24, 2013	21	FW	(United States) Brian Shriver	(United States) Carolina RailHawks	Signed to a four-year contract, with a club option for the third and fourth year.	
January 2, 2014	17	FW	(Zimbabwe) Lucky Mkosana	(United States) Harrisburg City Islanders	Signed to a one-year contract.	
January 2, 2014	14	DF	(United States) Jordan Gafa	(United States) Tampa Bay Rowdies	Agreed to a two-year contract, with a club option for the second year.	
January 3, 2014	7	DF	(United States) Frankie Sanfilippo	(United States) Tampa Bay Rowdies	Re-signed to a two-year contract, with a club option for the second year.	
January 3, 2014	11	MF	(England) Shane Hill	(United States) Tampa Bay Rowdies	Re-signed to a three-year contract, with a club option for the second and third year.	
January 7, 2014	86	MF	(Sweden) Christophe Lallet	(Sweden) Hammarby IF	Signed to a two-year contract, with a club option for the second year.	
January 7, 2014	99	GK	(Jamaica) Ryan Thompson	(Sweden) AFC United	Signed to a two-year contract, with a club option for the second year.	
January 10, 2014	25	FW	(Guyana) Carl Cort	(United States) Tampa Bay Rowdies	Re-signed to a one-year contract.	
January 10, 2014	20	FW	(Ghana) Evans Frimpong	(United States) Tampa Bay Rowdies	Agreed to a two-year contract, with a club option for the second year.	
January 29, 2014	5	DF	(Guyana) J.P. Rodrigues	None	Signed to a two-year contract, with a club option for the second year.	
February 10, 2014	32	DF	(Japan) Takuya Yamada	(United States) Tampa Bay Rowdies	Re-signed to a one-year contract.	
February 10, 2014	9	FW	(United States) Devin Del Do	(United States) Tampa Bay Rowdies	Re-signed to a two-year contract, with a club option for the second year.	
February 10, 2014	13	MF	(United States) Anthony Wallace	(United States) Colorado Rapids	Signed to a one-year contract.	
February 27, 2014	8	MF	(England) Darel Russell	(Canada) Toronto FC	Signed to a two-year contract, with a club option for the second year.	
March 11, 2014	15	FW	(United States) Casey Townsend	(United States) D.C. United	Signed to a one-year contract.	
March 17, 2014	1	GK	(United States) Cody Mizell	(United States) Atlanta Silverbacks	Signed to a two-year contract, with a club option for the second year.	
March 26, 2014	18	GK	(United States) Matt Pickens	(United States) New England Revolution	Signed to a multi-year contract with the club.	
July 4, 2014	35	FW	(Argentina) Luciano Olguín	Free agent		
July 4, 2014	27	DF	(England) Tamika Mkandawire	Free agent		
July 25, 2014	23	MF	(Jamaica) Ricardo Morris	(Jamaica) Portmore United F.C.		
September 24, 2014	81	FW	(United States) Corey Hertzog	(United States) Orlando City SC	Signed through the 2015 season, with a club option for 2016	

=== Out ===
Date	Pos.	Player	Transferred to	Fee/notes	Source
December 19, 2013	DF	(Canada) Andres Arango	None	Club declined contract option.	
December 19, 2013	FW	(Malta) Etienne Barbara	None	Club declined contract option.	
December 19, 2013	MF	(United States) Jamael Cox	None	Club declined contract option.	
December 19, 2013	MF	(United States) Raphael Cox	(United States) Harrisburg City Islanders	Free agent; signed with the Harrisburg City Islanders	
December 19, 2013	GK	(United States) Andrew Fontein	None	Free agent	
December 19, 2013	DF	(United States) Thurstan Johnson	None	Club declined contract option.	
December 19, 2013	MF	(England) Luke Mulholland	(United States) Real Salt Lake	Free agent; signed with Real Salt Lake	
December 19, 2013	DF	(United States) Daniel Scott	(United States) Carolina RailHawks	Free agent; signed with the Carolina RailHawks	
December 19, 2013	DF	(United States) Draymond Washington	None	Club declined contract option.	
July 4, 2014	MF	(Sweden) Christophe Lallet	(Sweden) IK Frej	Mutually agreed to terminate contract.	
October 9, 2014	FW	(England) Carl Cort	None	Retirement.	
