= 2013 Atlanta Silverbacks season =

Atlanta Silverbacks
2013 season
- Owners: Boris Jerkunica; John Latham
- Head coach: Brian Haynes
- Stadium: Atlanta Silverbacks Park
- Spring season: 1st
- Fall Season: 7th
- Soccer Bowl: Runner-Up
- U.S. Open Cup: Third Round
- Top goalscorer: League: Rubén Luna (10); All: Luna & Mendes (8)
Home colors	Away colors

The 2013 season was the Atlanta Silverbacks's seventeenth season of existence, and their third consecutive season playing in the North American Soccer League, the second division of the American soccer pyramid.

== Background ==
The Atlanta Silverbacks' 2012 season was a tale of two halves. In their first 15 games they only managed 8 points, through 1 win, 5 draws and 9 losses. In their final 13 games they gather 22 points in 6 wins, 4 draws and 3 losses (a league best).

They had mixed results in U.S. Open Cup, winning their first match against fourth division opponent Georgia Revolution 1–0. Then losing to MLS side Seattle Sounders FC 5-1 a week later.

On July 2, 2012 first-year head coach Alex Pineda Chacón was replaced by interim head coach Eric Wynalda. Wynalda announced Brian Haynes would replace him as head coach.

== Club ==
=== Roster ===
Note: Flags indicate national team as defined under FIFA eligibility rules; some limited exceptions apply. Players may hold more than one non-FIFA nationality.

No.	Pos.	Nation	Player
1	FW	MEX	Rubén Luna
2	DF	USA	Mike Randolph
3	DF	USA	Shane Moroney
4	DF	USA	Bobby Reiss
5	MF	ESA	Richard Menjivar
6	DF	USA	Beto Navarro
7	MF	USA	Pablo Cruz
8	MF	USA	Milton Blanco
9	FW	BRA	Pedro Ferreira-Mendes
10	MF	USA	Danny Barrera
11	MF	COL	Alex Caceres
12	MF	JAM	Horace James
13	DF	USA	Willie Hunt
14	DF	ARG	Lucas Paulini
15	MF	USA	Mario Uribe
16	GK	CMR	Eric Ati

No.	Pos.	Nation	Player
17	FW	USA	Brad Stisser
18	GK	USA	Joe Nasco
19	MF	LBR	Borfor Carr
20	MF	USA	Mark Withers
22	DF	USA	Mark Lavery
23	MF	USA	Brandon Manzonelli
24	MF	USA	Scott Rojo
25	MF	COD	Ferrety Sousa
27	DF	ENG	Martyn Lancaster (captain)
28	MF	USA	Rury Alvarez
29	DF	PER	Eduardo Liza
33	DF	USA	Josh Suggs
70	MF	USA	Jesus Gonzalez
77	FW	USA	Jahbari Willis
91	GK	USA	Cody Mizell
94	FW	USA	Kellen Gulley

==== On loan ====
Note: Flags indicate national team as defined under FIFA eligibility rules; some limited exceptions apply. Players may hold more than one non-FIFA nationality.

No.	Pos.	Nation	Player
21	DF	USA	Mark Bloom (on loan to Toronto FC)

=== Technical Staff ===
- (Trinidad and Tobago) Brian Haynes – Head Coach
- (Brazil) José Pinho – Goalkeeper Coach
- (United States) Eric Wynalda – Technical Director

== Competitions ==
=== Preseason ===
March 7, 2013 Preseason	Atlanta Silverbacks	5–0	North Georgia Nighthawks	Chamblee, Georgia
2:30 PM ET		Report		Stadium: Atlanta Silverbacks Park

March 9, 2013 Preseason	Atlanta Silverbacks	2–0	Georgia State Panthers	Chamblee, Georgia
2:30 PM ET		Report		Stadium: Atlanta Silverbacks Park

March 16, 2013 Preseason	Atlanta Silverbacks	2–1	UAB Blazers	Chamblee, Georgia
2:30 PM ET	James 35'; Blanco 85'	Report	60'	Stadium: Atlanta Silverbacks Park

March 30, 2013 Preseason	Atlanta Silverbacks	3–0	Charlotte Eagles	Chamblee, Georgia
4:00 PM ET	Luna 35', 45' (pen.); Moroney	Report		Stadium: Atlanta Silverbacks Park

=== Friendlies ===
July 19, 2013	Georgia Revolution	1-2	Atlanta Silverbacks	Conyers, Georgia
	Sissoko 54'	Report	Brazilian Trialist 51' French Trialist 90'

July 27, 2013	Atlanta Silverbacks (United States)	3-2	Xelajú (Guatemala)	Chamblee, Georgia
	Barrera 7', 53' Caceres 72'		Estacuy 70' Silva 77'

=== NASL ===
==== Spring season ====
===== Table =====
Pos	Team	Pld	W	D	L	GF	GA	GD	Pts	Qualification
1	Atlanta Silverbacks (S)	12	6	3	3	20	15	+5	21	Soccer Bowl 2013
2	Carolina RailHawks	12	5	5	2	20	16	+4	20	
3	San Antonio Scorpions	12	6	2	4	19	15	+4	20	
4	Tampa Bay Rowdies	12	5	3	4	21	16	+5	18	
5	FC Edmonton	12	3	5	4	13	12	+1	14	
6	Minnesota United FC	12	4	2	6	18	23	−5	14	
7	Fort Lauderdale Strikers	12	2	2	8	10	24	−14	8	

Source: NASL Standings
Rules for classification: 1) points; 2) goal difference; 3) number of goals scored.
(S) Spring season champion

===== Results summary =====
Overall								Home						Away					
Pld	W	D	L	GF	GA	GD	Pts	W	D	L	GF	GA	GD	W	D	L	GF	GA	GD
12	6	3	3	20	15	+5	21	3	1	2	9	6	+3	3	2	1	11	9	+2

Last updated: April 21, 2013.
Source: Spring season 2013 results

===== Results by round =====
Round	1	2	3	4	5	6	7	8	9	10	11	12
Stadium	H	A	H	A	A	H	H	H	A	H	A	A
Result	W	W	L	D	L	W	W	D	W	L	D	W
Position	3	2	4	4	5	3	1	2	1	2	2	1

Updated to match(es) played on April 20, 2013. Source: Spring season 2013 results
A = Away; H = Home; W = Win; D = Draw; L = Loss

===== Match results =====
April 14, 2013 Match 1	Atlanta Silverbacks	2–0	Fort Lauderdale Strikers	Chamblee, Georgia
7:30 PM ET	Navarro 86' Barrera 88'	Report		Stadium: Atlanta Silverbacks Park; Attendance: 5,402

April 20, 2013 Match 2	Tampa Bay Rowdies	3–4	Atlanta Silverbacks	St. Petersburg, Florida
7:30 PM ET	Frimpong 9'; Mulholland 24', 44'	Report	Luna 22', 63'; Mendes 53', 70'	Stadium: Al Lang Stadium

April 27, 2013 Match 3	Atlanta Silverbacks	2–3	Minnesota United FC	Chamblee, Georgia
7:30 PM ET	Blanco 17'; Luna 26'	Report	Kallman 23' Bracalello 54' Pitchkolan 61'	Stadium: Atlanta Silverbacks Park

May 4, 2013 Match 4	San Antonio Scorpions	2-2	Atlanta Silverbacks	San Antonio, Texas
8:30 PM ET	Denissen 20'; Husić 28'	Report	Menjivar 5'; Mendes 30'	Stadium: Toyota Field

May 12, 2013 Match 5	FC Edmonton	3-0	Atlanta Silverbacks	Edmonton, Alberta
4:00 PM ET	Fordyce 39'; Cox 44', 49'	Report		Stadium: Clarke Stadium

May 18, 2013 Match 6	Atlanta Silverbacks	2-0	Carolina RailHawks	Chamblee, Georgia
7:30 PM ET	Luna 6'; Lancaster 76'	Report		Stadium: Atlanta Silverbacks Park; Attendance: 4,716

May 25, 2013 Match 7	Atlanta Silverbacks	1-0	San Antonio Scorpions	Chamblee, Georgia
7:30 PM ET	Barrera 86'	Report		Stadium: Atlanta Silverbacks Park

June 8, 2013 Match 8	Atlanta Silverbacks	1-1	FC Edmonton	Chamblee, Georgia
7:30 PM ET	Stisser 60'	Report	Hlavaty 70'	Stadium: Atlanta Silverbacks Park; Attendance: 5,000

June 15, 2013 Match 9	Fort Lauderdale Strikers	0-1	Atlanta Silverbacks	Fort Lauderdale, Florida
7:30 PM ET		Report	Menjivar 90+1' (pen.)	Stadium: Lockhart Stadium

June 22, 2013 Match 10	Atlanta Silverbacks	1-2	Tampa Bay Rowdies	Chamblee, Georgia
7:30 PM ET	Cruz 62'	Report	Hristov 50' (pen.) Ambersley 59' (pen.)	Stadium: Atlanta Silverbacks Park; Attendance: 5,711

June 29, 2013 Match 11	Carolina RailHawks	1-1	Atlanta Silverbacks	Cary, North Carolina
7:30 PM ET	da Luz 89'	Report	Reiss 64'	Stadium: WakeMed Soccer Park

July 4, 2013 Match 12	Minnesota United FC	0-3	Atlanta Silverbacks	Blaine, Minnesota
8:30 PM ET		Report	Stisser 30' Reiss 73' Luna 83'	Stadium: NSC Stadium

==== Fall season ====
===== Table =====
Pos	Team	Pld	W	D	L	GF	GA	GD	Pts	Qualification
1	New York Cosmos (F)	14	9	4	1	22	12	+10	31	Soccer Bowl 2013
2	Carolina RailHawks	14	7	2	5	21	16	+5	23	
3	Tampa Bay Rowdies	14	5	5	4	30	27	+3	20	
4	Minnesota United FC	14	6	2	6	21	19	+2	20	
5	Fort Lauderdale Strikers	14	5	3	6	18	20	−2	18	
6	FC Edmonton	14	3	7	4	13	14	−1	16	
7	Atlanta Silverbacks	14	4	4	6	14	22	−8	16	
8	San Antonio Scorpions	14	3	1	10	15	24	−9	10	

Source: NASL Standings
Rules for classification: 1) points; 2) goal difference; 3) number of goals scored.
(F) Fall season champion

===== Results summary =====
Overall								Home						Away					
Pld	W	D	L	GF	GA	GD	Pts	W	D	L	GF	GA	GD	W	D	L	GF	GA	GD
14	4	4	6	14	22	−8	16	3	2	2	8	6	+2	1	2	4	6	16	−10

Source: Fall season 2013 results

===== Results by round =====
Round	1	2	3	4	5	6	7	8	9	10	11	12	13	14
Stadium	A	H	A	H	H	A	H	A	H	A	H	A	A	H
Result	W	D	D	L	D	D	W	L	W	L	W	L	L	L
Position	3	2	3	5	6	6	5	6	5	6	3	5	6	7

Updated to match(es) played on February 16, 2013. Source: Fall season 2013 results
A = Away; H = Home; W = Win; D = Draw; L = Loss

===== Match results =====
August 3, 2013 Match 1	Minnesota United FC	0-1	Atlanta Silverbacks	Blaine, Minnesota
		Report	Randolph 22'	Stadium: NSC Stadium

August 10, 2013 Match 2	Atlanta Silverbacks	1-1	Carolina RailHawks	Chamblee, Georgia
	Mendes 27'	Report	Low 72'	Stadium: Atlanta Silverbacks Park

August 18, 2013 Match 3	FC Edmonton	1-1	Atlanta Silverbacks	Edmonton, Alberta
	Nurse 69'	Report	James 48'	Stadium: Clarke Stadium

August 24, 2013 Match 4	Atlanta Silverbacks	0-1	Fort Lauderdale Strikers	Chamblee, Georgia
		Report	Baladez 34'	Stadium: Atlanta Silverbacks Park

August 31, 2013 Match 5	Atlanta Silverbacks	1-1	Tampa Bay Rowdies	Chamblee, Georgia
	Mendes 4'	Report	Hristov 50'	Stadium: Atlanta Silverbacks Park

September 7, 2013 Match 6	New York Cosmos	1-1	Atlanta Silverbacks	Hempstead, New York
	Senna 44' (pen.)	Report	Moroney 49'	Stadium: James M. Shuart Stadium

September 14, 2013 Match 7	Atlanta Silverbacks	2-1	San Antonio Scorpions	Chamblee, Georgia
	Luna 13' Barerra 51'	Report	Denissen 66'	Stadium: Atlanta Silverbacks Park

September 21, 2013 Match 8	Tampa Bay Rowdies	3-1	Atlanta Silverbacks	St. Petersburg, Florida
7:30 PM ET	Hristov 54', 57' Hill 65'	Report	James 75'	Stadium: Al Lang Stadium

September 28, 2013 Match 9	Atlanta Silverbacks	1-0	FC Edmonton	Chamblee, Georgia
	Mendes 15' (pen.)	Report		Stadium: Atlanta Silverbacks Park

October 5, 2013 Match 10	San Antonio Scorpions	1-0	Atlanta Silverbacks	San Antonio, Texas
	Zahorski 64'	Report		Stadium: Toyota Field

October 12, 2013 Match 11	Atlanta Silverbacks	3-1	Minnesota United FC	Chamblee, Georgia
	Luna 42' Barrera 74' Mendes 89' (pen.)	Report	Bracalello 82' (pen.)	Stadium: Atlanta Silverbacks Park

October 19, 2013 Match 12	Fort Lauderdale Strikers	6-2	Atlanta Silverbacks	Fort Lauderdale, Florida
	Nuñez 20' Pérez 41', 63' Salazar 53' (pen.) Baladez 67', 83'	Report	Luna 34' Mendes 86' (pen.)	Stadium: Lockhart Stadium

October 26, 2013 Match 13	Carolina RailHawks	4-0	Atlanta Silverbacks	Cary, North Carolina
	Kalungi 10' da Luz 20' Addlery 66' Shriver 89' (pen.)	Report		Stadium: WakeMed Soccer Park

November 2, 2013 Match 14	Atlanta Silverbacks	0-1	New York Cosmos	Chamblee, Georgia
			López 34'	Stadium: Atlanta Silverbacks Park

=== U.S. Open Cup ===
May 21, 2013 Second round	Georgia Revolution (Georgia (U.S. state))	2-3	Atlanta Silverbacks (Georgia (U.S. state))	Conyers, Georgia
	Smith 16' Enang 34'	Report	Luna 4', 31' (pen.) Cruz 57'	Stadium: RYSA Soccerplex

May 28, 2013 Third round	Real Salt Lake (Utah)	3-2 (a.e.t.)	Atlanta Silverbacks (Georgia (U.S. state))	Sandy, Utah
	Beckerman 3' Sandoval 97' Stephenson 100'	Report	Gulley 87' Cruz 120'	Stadium: Rio Tinto Stadium

== Playoffs ==
November 9, 2013 2013 Soccer Bowl	Atlanta Silverbacks	0-1	New York Cosmos	Chamblee, Georgia
7:00 pm EST			Senna 51'	Stadium: Atlanta Silverbacks Park

== Statistics ==
=== Goals ===
Includes all competitive matches. The list is sorted by shirt number when total goals are equal.

Last updated on June 18, 2013

Rank	Pos	No.	Player	NASL Spring	NASL Fall	U.S. Open Cup	Soccer Bowl	Total
1	FW	1	(Mexico) Rubén Luna	5	3	2	0	10
2	FW	9	(Brazil) Pedro Ferreira-Mendes	3	5	0	0	8
3	MF	10	(United States) Danny Barrera	2	2	0	0	4
4	MF	7	(United States) Pablo Cruz	1	0	2	0	3
5	DF	4	(United States) Bobby Reiss	2	0	0	0	2
5	MF	5	(El Salvador) Richard Menjivar	2	0	0	0	2
5	MF	12	(Jamaica) Horace James	0	2	0	0	2
5	FW	17	(United States) Brad Stisser	2	0	0	0	2
9	DF	2	(United States) Mike Randolph	0	1	0	0	1
9	DF	3	(United States) Shane Moroney	0	1	0	0	1
9	DF	6	(United States) Beto Navarro	1	0	0	0	1
9	MF	8	(United States) Milton Blanco	1	0	0	0	1
9	DF	27	(England) Martyn Lancaster	1	0	0	0	1
9	FW	94	(United States) Kellen Gulley	0	0	1	0	1
TOTALS				20	14	5	0	39

=== Assists ===
Includes all competitive matches. The list is sorted by shirt number when total assists are equal.

Last updated on February 14, 2013

Rank	Pos	No.	Player	NASL Spring	NASL Fall	U.S. Open Cup	Soccer Bowl	Total
1	MF	10	(United States) Danny Barrera	5	2	1	0	8
2	MF	8	(United States) Milton Blanco	2	1	1	0	4
3	DF	3	(United States) Shane Moroney	1	2	0	0	3
4	FW	1	(Mexico) Rubén Luna	0	1	1	0	2
4	MF	5	(El Salvador) Richard Menjivar	1	1	0	0	2
4	MF	19	(Liberia) Borfor Carr	1	1	0	0	2
7	DF	2	(United States) Mike Randolph	0	1	0	0	1
7	MF	7	(United States) Pablo Cruz	0	1	0	0	1
7	MF	12	(Jamaica) Horace James	1	0	0	0	1
7	DF	21	(United States) Mark Bloom	1	N/A	0	N/A	1
TOTALS				12	10	3	0	25

=== Clean sheets ===
Includes all competitive matches. The list is sorted by shirt number when total clean sheets are equal.

Last updated on June 18, 2013

Rank	Pos	No.	Player	NASL Spring	NASL Fall	U.S. Open Cup	Soccer Bowl	Total
1	GK	18	(United States) Joe Nasco	3	1	0	0	4
2	GK	16	(Cameroon) Eric Ati	2	1	0	0	3
3	GK	91	(United States) Cody Mizell	0	0	0	0	0
TOTALS				5	2	0	0	7

== Transfers ==
=== In ===
No.	Pos.	Nat.	Name	Age	Moving from	Type	Transfer window	Ends	Transfer fee	Source
1	FW	(Mexico)	Rubén Luna	21	FC Dallas	Transfer	Pre-season		Free	AtlantaSilverbacks.com
4	DF	(United States)	Bobby Reiss	22	Cal State Fullerton Titans	Signed	Pre-season		None	AtlantaSilverbacks.com
17	MF	(United States)	Mark Withers	20	Dallas Sidekicks	Signed	Pre-season		None	AtlantaSilverbacks.com
23	MF	(United States)	Brandon Manzonelli	23	New England Revolution	Signed	Pre-season		None	AtlantaSilverbacks.com
21	DF	(United States)	Mark Bloom	25	Charlotte Eagles	Transfer	Pre-season		Undisclosed	AtlantaSilverbacks.com
17	FW	(United States)	Brad Stisser	26	Charlotte Eagles	Signed	Pre-season		Undisclosed	AtlantaSilverbacks.com
15	MF	(United States)	Mario Uribe	24	FIU Golden Panthers	Signed	Pre-season		Undisclosed	AtlantaSilverbacks.com
24	MF	(United States)	Scott Rojo	24	High Point Panthers	Signed	Pre-season		Undisclosed	AtlantaSilverbacks.com
28	MF	(United States)	Rury Alvarez	22	Georgia Perimeter Jaguars	Signed	Pre-season		Undisclosed	AtlantaSilverbacks.com
29	DF	(Peru)	Eduardo Liza	19	Georgia State Panthers	Signed	Pre-season		Undisclosed	AtlantaSilverbacks.com
26	FW	(Costa Rica)	Andy Herron	35	Fort Lauderdale Strikers	Trade for Jahbari Willis	Mid-Season		None	AtlantaSilverbacks.com
11	MF	(Colombia)	Alex Caceres	26	Cal FC	Signed	Mid-Season		Undisclosed	AtlantaSilverbacks.com
70	MF	(United States)	Jesus Gonzalez	22		Signed	Mid-Season		Undisclosed	AtlantaSilverbacks.com
33	DF	(United States)	Josh Suggs	24	Los Angeles Blues	Signed	Mid-Season		Undisclosed	AtlantaSilverbacks.com
25	MF	(Democratic Republic of the Congo)	Ferrety Sousa	22	Aubervilliers (France)	Signed	Mid-Season		Undisclosed	AtlantaSilverbacks.com
1	FW	(Mexico)	Rubén Luna	21	Atlanta Silverbacks	Re-Signed	Mid-season		None	AtlantaSilverbacks.com
77	FW	(United States)	Jahbari Willis	23	Fort Lauderdale Strikers	Re-Signed	Mid-season		None	AtlantaSilverbacks.com

=== Out ===
No.	Pos.	Nat.	Name	Age	Moving to	Type	Transfer window	Transfer fee	Source
1	GK	(Hungary)	Daniel Illyes	30		Retiring	Pre-season		AtlantaSilverbacks.com
4	DF	(United States)	Patrick Robertson	26		Released	Pre-season		AtlantaSilverbacks.com
10	FW	(Chile)	Reinaldo Navia	34		Released	Pre-season		AtlantaSilverbacks.com
11	FW	(United States)	Jahbari Willis	22	Fort Lauderdale Strikers	Traded for Andy Herron	Mid-Season		AtlantaSilverbacks.com
1	FW	(Mexico)	Rubén Luna	21		Released	Mid-Season		AtlantaSilverbacks.com
26	FW	(Costa Rica)	Andy Herron	35		Released	Mid-Season		AtlantaSilverbacks.com

=== Loan in ===
No.	Pos.	Nat.	Name	Age	Moving from	Type	Transfer window	Ends	Transfer fee	Source
5	MF	(El Salvador)	Richard Menjivar	22	Turín FESA (El Salvador)	Loan	Pre-season	2013		AtlantaSilverbacks.com
–	FW	(United States)	Kellen Gulley	18	Chicago Fire	Loan	Pre-season	2013		AtlantaSilverbacks.com

=== Loan out ===
No.	Pos.	Nat.	Name	Age	Moving to	Type	Transfer window	Transfer fee	Source
2	DF	(United States)	Chris Klute	22	Colorado Rapids	Loan	Pre-season		AtlantaSilverbacks.com
21	DF	(United States)	Mark Bloom	25	Toronto FC (Canada)	Loan	Mid-season		AtlantaSilverbacks.com

== See also ==
- 2013 in American soccer
- 2013 North American Soccer League season
- Atlanta Silverbacks
