= Ramiro Canovas =

Argentine professional footballer

Personal information
- Date of birth: 6 August 1981 (age 45)
- Place of birth: Buenos Aires, Argentina
- Height: 1.88 m (6 ft 2 in)
- Position: Center back

Youth career
- 2000–2004: Mercer Bears

Senior career*
Years	Team	Apps	(Gls)
- Melchester Wings
2008–2013	Atlanta Silverbacks Reserves		
2014	Atlanta Silverbacks	18	(0)
- * Club domestic league appearances and goals as of November 23, 2014

Ramiro Canovas (born August 6, 1981) is an Argentine professional footballer who plays as a center back for the Atlanta Silverbacks in the North American Soccer League.

== Career ==
=== Early career ===
Born in Buenos Aires, Argentina, Canovas started his career in the United States with the Mercer University Bears before joining the Melchester Wings in the Atlanta District Amateur Soccer League. He then joined the Atlanta Silverbacks Reserves, then known as Atlanta FC, of the National Premier Soccer League. Canovas scored the club's first ever goal in 2008. He then went on to captain the Silverbacks Reserves from 2010 to 2012.

=== Atlanta Silverbacks ===
On March 2, 2014, it was announced that Canovas had signed his first professional contract at age 32 with the Atlanta Silverbacks of the North American Soccer League. He then made his professional debut with the side on May 17, 2014, against the Carolina RailHawks. He came on as a 6th-minute substitute for Edgar Espinoza as the Silverbacks lost 2–0.

== Career statistics ==
As of November 23, 2014

Club	Season	League			League Cup		U.S. Open Cup		CONCACAF		Total	
Club	Season	Division	Apps	Goals	Apps	Goals	Apps	Goals	Apps	Goals	Apps	Goals
Atlanta Silverbacks	2014	NASL	18	0	—	—	3	0	—	—	21	0
Career total			18	0	0	0	3	0	0	0	21	0
