= Bobby Reiss =

American soccer player

Personal information
- Date of birth: 30 September 1990 (age 36)
- Place of birth: Palmdale, California, U.S.
- Height: 1.83 m (6 ft 0 in)
- Position: Defender

Youth career
- 2009–2012: CSUF Titans

Senior career*
Years	Team	Apps	(Gls)
2009	Lancaster Rattlers	8	(0)
2013–2014	Atlanta Silverbacks	20	(2)
- * Club domestic league appearances and goals as of December 13, 2014

Bobby Reiss (born 30 September 1990) is an American retired professional soccer player.

== Career ==
In May 2017 Reiss was named Head Coach, Women's Soccer, Midamerica Nazarene University, Olathe, KS. He had served 3 years as assistant coach and the team achieved a 33–21–8, including two of the best years in program history in 2015 and 2016, reaching the NAIA National Tournament for the first time, as well as breaking into the top-25 schools in the nation. Reiss also graduated with his MBA in counseling from MNU this year.

=== College ===
Born in Palmdale, California, Reiss is a graduate of the California State University for which he played three seasons for the soccer team.

=== Atlanta Silverbacks ===
On 20 March 2013 it was announced that Reiss had signed a professional contract with the Atlanta Silverbacks of the North American Soccer League. Reiss then made his professional debut for the Silverbacks on 28 May 2013 in the US Open Cup against Real Salt Lake in which he started and played the full 90 as Atlanta lost the match 3–2.

On 30 June 2014 Reiss announced that he was stepping away from soccer to pursue an academic opportunity. He accepted a position as a graduate assistant for the women's soccer team at MidAmerica Nazarene University in Olathe, Kansas. While fulfilling his duties as a graduate assistant, he would also be pursuing a Master's degree in counseling.

== Career statistics ==
As of December 13, 2014

Club	Season	League		US Open Cup		Other		CONCACAF		Total	
Club	Season	Apps	Goals	Apps	Goals	Apps	Goals	Apps	Goals	Apps	Goals
Atlanta Silverbacks	2013	12	2	1	0	0	0	0	0	13	2
Atlanta Silverbacks	2014	8	0	2	0	0	0	0	0	10	0
Career total		20	2	3	0	0	0	0	0	23	2
