= Shaka Bangura =

Sierra Leonean footballer

Personal information
- Full name: Shaka Bangura
- Date of birth: February 9, 1986 (age 40)
- Place of birth: Kissy, Sierra Leone
- Height: 5 ft 7 in (1.70 m)
- Position: Striker

Youth career
- 2005–2009: Montreat College

Senior career*
Years	Team	Apps	(Gls)
2008	Atlanta FC	6	(2)
2009	Fredericksburg Gunners	18	(12)
2010	Puerto Rico Islanders	14	(0)
2011	Richmond Kickers	19	(4)
2012	Anagennisi Dherynia	10	(1)
2013	Samut Songkhram	2	(0)
2014	Barito Putera	3	(0)
2014–2015	Atlanta Silverbacks	32	(4)
2018	Northern Virginia United	9	(3)
- * Club domestic league appearances and goals as of 22 February 2016

Shaka Bangura (born February 9, 1986, in Kissy) is a Sierra Leonean footballer.

== Career ==
=== Youth and college ===
Bangura moved to the United States from Sierra Leone when he was a small child, settling in College Park, Georgia. He attended North Clayton High School, where he scored a total of 58 goals and was named to the All Region Team every year. He then earned a sports scholarship to attend Montreat College in North Carolina. At Montreat he consistently made All Conference first team in the Appalachian Athletic Conference (AAC). His first year at Montreat he was named freshman of the year and was also named the conference player of the year in his sophomore and junior year and during his senior year he won the golden boot award He finished his college career having scored a total of 58 goals in four years.

During his college years Bangura also played with Atlanta FC in the National Premier Soccer League in 2008, and with Fredericksburg Gunners in the USL Premier Development League in 2009.

=== Professional ===
During the 2010 pre-season Bangura joined the Puerto Rico Islanders of the USSF D2 Pro League. He made his professional debut on April 21, 2010, in a game against NSC Minnesota Stars.

Bangura signed with Richmond Kickers of the USL Pro league on March 15, 2011, and scored the winning goal on his Kickers debut, a 2–1 win over Charleston Battery on April 23. After the 2011 season, Bangura signed with Anagennisi Dherynia in the Cypriot First Division. In 2013 Bangura signed with Samut Songkhram in the Thai Premier League, where he helped the team survive relegation. One of his brightest moments came against Chainat, whom he single-handedly defeated. Later the week he made the Thai premier League all team. In 2014 Bangura was invited for a tryout with Persija Jakarta. Bangura impressed with two goals in two games but was not awarded a contract. After the two games many teams in the Indonesia Super League were interested. Bangura decided to sign with Barito Putera, where he played 6 games with 4 goals and 2 assists in the Inter Island Cup.

== Honours ==
=== Puerto Rico Islanders ===
- CFU Club Championship Winner (1): 2010
- USSF Division 2 Pro League Champion (1): 2010

== Personal life ==
He is the cousin of Abdul Bangura, his teammate at Atlanta Silverbacks.
