= Thomas Hunter (soccer) =

American soccer player

Personal information
- Date of birth: 7 June 1988 (age 38)
- Place of birth: Charlotte, North Carolina, United States
- Height: 1.88 m (6 ft 2 in)
- Position: Goalkeeper

Youth career
- 2006–2009: Wofford Terriers

Senior career*
Years	Team	Apps	(Gls)
2010–2013	Chattanooga FC		
2014–	Atlanta Silverbacks	1	(0)
- * Club domestic league appearances and goals as of July 2, 2014

Thomas Hunter (born June 7, 1988) is an American professional soccer player who plays as a goalkeeper for the Atlanta Silverbacks in the North American Soccer League.

== Career ==
=== Early career ===
Born in Charlotte, North Carolina, Hunter started his youth career attending various camps in England, Denmark, Sweden, and the United States. He then joined the Wofford College Terriers in 2006. He played there till 2009. After college Hunter joined National Premier Soccer League side Chattanooga FC where he played for four seasons. While with Chattanooga, Hunter was named to the 2011 NPSL All-Star Team and led his team to the NPSL finals in 2012.

=== Atlanta Silverbacks ===
On May 1, 2014, after an injury to Derby Carrillo, it was announced that Hunter had signed for the Atlanta Silverbacks of the North American Soccer League. He made his professional debut for the side on June 7, 2014, against Indy Eleven. Hunter came on as a 32nd-minute substitute for Eric Ati and conceded two penalties as the game ended in a 3–3 draw.

== Career statistics ==
As of July 3, 2014

Club	Season	League			League Cup		U.S. Open Cup		CONCACAF		Total	
Club	Season	Division	Apps	Goals	Apps	Goals	Apps	Goals	Apps	Goals	Apps	Goals
Atlanta Silverbacks	2014	NASL	1	0	—	—	0	0	—	—	1	0
Career total			1	0	0	0	0	0	0	0	1	0
