= 2016 Charlotte Independence season =

Charlotte Independence
2016 season
- President: Jim McPhilliamy
- Head coach: Mike Jeffries
- Stadium: Ramblewood Soccer Complex
- USL: Conference: TBD
- USL Playoffs: TBD
Home colors	Away colors

The 2016 Charlotte Independence season was the club's second year of existence, and their second season in the third tier of the United States Soccer Pyramid. It was their second season in the United Soccer League as part of the Eastern Conference.

== Roster ==
As of March 1, 2016

No.	Position	Nation	Player
1	GK	USA	Cody Mizell
2	MF	ENG	Jack Metcalf
3	DF	USA	Bilal Duckett
4	DF	USA	Patrick Slogic
5	MF	ENG	Paul Clowes
6	MF	JPN	Jun Marques Davidson
7	FW	FRA	Yann Ekra
8	FW	USA	Caleb Calvert (on loan from Colorado Rapids)
9	FW	JAM	Brian Brown (on loan from Harbour View)
10	MF	COL	Jorge Herrera
11	FW	USA	David Estrada
12	GK	USA	John Berner (on loan from Colorado Rapids)
13	DF	USA	Austin Yearwood
14	MF	ENG	Lewis Hilton
15	DF	USA	Alec Bartlett
16	MF	GHA	Emmanuel Appiah (on loan from Colorado Rapids)
19	MF	URU	Enzo Martínez
20	FW	GER	Christopher Hellmann
21	FW	USA	Asa Kryst
22	DF	ESP	Joel Johnson
23	MF	URU	Alex Martínez
24	FW	USA	Norberto Ochoa
25	DF	UGA	Henry Kalungi
26	GK	USA	Kyle Renfro
27	MF	USA	Zach Pfeffer (on loan from Colorado Rapids)

== Competitions ==
=== USL Regular season ===
==== Standings ====
Pos	Team	Pld	W	D	L	GF	GA	GD	Pts	Qualification
3	FC Cincinnati	30	16	8	6	41	27	+14	56	Conference Playoffs
4	Rochester Rhinos	30	13	12	5	38	25	+13	51	Conference Playoffs
5	Charlotte Independence	30	14	8	8	48	29	+19	50	Conference Playoffs
6	Charleston Battery	30	13	9	8	38	33	+5	48	Conference Playoffs
7	Richmond Kickers	30	12	9	9	33	26	+7	45	Conference Playoffs

Source: 2016 USL Standings
Rules for classification: 1) total wins; 2) total goal differential; 3) total goals scored; 4) points earned against top four Conference finishers; 5) disciplinary points; 6) coin toss or drawing of lots

==== Matches ====
All times in regular season on Eastern Daylight Time (UTC-04:00)

Win Draw Loss Upcoming fixture

March 26, 2016 1	Charlotte Independence	0–1	Louisville City FC	Charlotte, North Carolina
7:00pm	Metcalf (yellow card); Herrera (yellow card); Duckett (yellow card); Martínez (yellow card)	http://www.uslsoccer.com/game/show/13218092?subseason=280291&referrer=2356900 Report	Lancaster 90+4'; Shanosky (yellow card); Kaye (yellow card)	Stadium: Ramblewood Soccer Complex; Attendance: 1,724; Referee: Marcos Deoliveira

April 2, 2016 2	Charlotte Independence	2–1	Harrisburg City Islanders	Charlotte, North Carolina
7:00pm	Calvert 22'; Estrada 34'	Report	Foster 3'; Johnson (yellow card) 55'; Wheeler (yellow card) 59'; Barril (yellow card) 84'	Stadium: Ramblewood Soccer Complex

April 9, 2016 3	FC Cincinnati	2–1	Charlotte Independence	Cincinnati, Ohio
7:00pm	Okoli 5'; Berry 53'; Hildebrandt (yellow card) 90+3'	Report	Estrada 53'; Ekra (yellow card) 82'	Stadium: Nippert Stadium; Attendance: 14,658; Referee: Nima Saghafi

April 16, 2016 4	Charlotte Independence	3–2	Charleston Battery	Charlotte, North Carolina
7:00pm	Martínez 26' (yellow card) 28'; Brian Brown 31'; Herrera 70'	Report	Hackshaw (yellow card) 56'; Ferguson (yellow card) 73'; Williams 77' (yellow card) 88'; Prince (red card) 83'; Portillo 87'	Stadium: Ramblewood Soccer Complex

April 22, 2016 5	Charlotte Independence	3–2	Richmond Kickers	Charlotte, North Carolina
7:00pm	Calvert 43'; Alajarín (yellow card) 54'; Brown (yellow card) 61'; Mizell (yellow card) 90'; Herrera 90+2' (pen.)	Report	Jane 20'; Sekyere (yellow card) 26'; Yeisley (yellow card) 86'; Delicâte 89'	Stadium: Ramblewood Soccer Complex; Attendance: 1,239; Referee: David Erbacher

May 1, 2016 6	New York Red Bulls II	0–2	Charlotte Independence	Harrison, New Jersey
4:00pm		Report	Martínez 13'; Slogic (yellow card) 29' (goal) 34' Pfeffer (yellow card) 90'	Stadium: Red Bull Arena; Attendance: 134

May 7, 2016 7	Charlotte Independence	1–0	FC Montreal	Charlotte, North Carolina
7:00pm	Calvert 10'; Slogic (yellow card) 51'; Ekra (yellow card) 89'	Report		Stadium: Ramblewood Soccer Complex; Attendance: 1,235

May 10, 2016 8	Wilmington Hammerheads FC	1–1	Charlotte Independence	Wilmington, North Carolina
7:00pm	Perone 15' (pen.)	Report	Brown 42'	Stadium: Legion Field; Attendance: 2,776

May 14, 2016 9	Rochester Rhinos	0–0	Charlotte Independence	Rochester, New York
6:00pm	Fall (yellow card) 14'; Samuel (yellow card) 62'	Report	Ekra (yellow card) 42'	Stadium: Rochester Rhinos Stadium; Attendance: 2,142

May 28, 2016 10	Orlando City B	2–1	Charlotte Independence	Melbourne, Florida
7:30pm	Turner (yellow card) 18' da Silva 53', 71'	Report	Alajarín (yellow card) 16'; Slogic (yellow card) 20'; Brown 33'; Kalungi (yellow card) 70'	Stadium: Titan Soccer Complex

June 4, 2016 11	Charlotte Independence	2–2	Toronto FC II	Charlotte, North Carolina
7:00pm	Castillo (yellow card) 31'; Herrera 47', 56'; Brown (yellow card) 61'	Report	Hundal 19'; Johnson 36' (pen.); James (yellow card) 67'	Stadium: Ramblewood Soccer Stadium; Attendance: 1,801; Referee: Brandon Artis
Note: Match ended in 73rd minute due to weather.

June 10, 2016 12	Charlotte Independence	0–1	Bethlehem Steel FC	Charlotte, North Carolina
7:00pm	Duckett (yellow card) 70'; Calvert (yellow card) 78'	Report	Burke 11' (yellow card) 69'	Stadium: Ramblewood Soccer Complex; Attendance: 1,319; Referee: Rubiel Vazquez

June 18, 2016 13	Charlotte Independence	1–0	Richmond Kickers	Charlotte, North Carolina
7:00pm	Calvert 30'; Martinez (yellow card) 35'	Report	Callahan (yellow card) 40'; Paulini (yellow card) 73'	Stadium: Ramblewood Soccer Complex; Attendance: 1,564; Referee: Marco Vega

June 25, 2016 14	Harrisburg City Islanders	1–3	Charlotte Independence	Harrisburg, Pennsylvania
7:00pm	Foster 10'; Johnson (yellow card) 27'; Dabo (yellow card) 40'; Thomas (red card)	Report	Kalungi (yellow card) 5'; Martinez 53' (pen.); Brown (yellow card) 54'; Johnson (yellow card) 75'; Hilton 86'	Stadium: FNB Field; Attendance: 421

July 2, 2016 15	Orlando City B	1–1	Charlotte Independence	Melbourne, Florida
7:30pm	Ambrose (yellow card) 40'; Cox 47'; Rocha (yellow card) 67'	Report	Brown 24'; Martínez (yellow card) 51'; Hilton (yellow card) 54'; Clowes (yellow card) 72'	Stadium: Titan Soccer Complex; Attendance: 731

July 9, 2016 16	Charlotte Independence	1–2	Wilmington Hammerheads FC	Charlotte, North Carolina
7:00pm	Hilton 45+1'	Report	Perone (yellow card) 20'; Fairclough (yellow card) 24'; Townsend 43'; Martz 65'	Stadium: Ramblewood Soccer Complex; Attendance: 1,595

July 16, 2016 17	Charlotte Independence	1–2	New York Red Bulls II	Charlotte, North Carolina
7:00pm	Davidson 48'; Brown (red card) 60'; Duckett (yellow card) 90+1'	Report	Allen (yellow card) 13'; Bonomo 15'; Metzger 63'; Schmoll (yellow card) 80'; Long (red card) 88'	Stadium: Ramblewood Soccer Complex; Attendance: 1,288

July 23, 2016 18	Pittsburgh Riverhounds	0–3	Charlotte Independence	Pittsburgh, Pennsylvania
7:00pm	Earls (yellow card) 1'; Campbell (yellow card) 63'	Report	Calvert 31'; Hilton 44'; Herrera 90+4'	Stadium: Highmark Stadium; Attendance: 1,500; Referee: Greg Dopka

July 30, 2016 19	FC Montreal	0–1	Charlotte Independence	Montreal, Quebec
3:00pm	Mkungilwa (yellow card) 29'; Gagnon-Laparé (yellow card) 33'; Choinière (yellow card) 90+1'	Report	Martínez 49'	Stadium: Complexe sportif Claude-Robillard; Attendance: 134

August 3, 2016 20	Charleston Battery	1–1	Charlotte Independence	Charleston, South Carolina
7:30pm	Williams 8'; Woodbine (yellow card) 48'	Report	Kalungi (yellow card) 28'; Davidson (yellow card) 58'; Calvert 65'; Martínez (yellow card) 86'	Stadium: MUSC Health Stadium

August 7, 2016 21	Bethlehem Steel FC	2–2	Charlotte Independence	Bethlehem, Pennsylvania
4:00pm	Conneh 22'; Chambers (yellow card) 25'; Trusty (yellow card) 35'; Rchter 88' (pen.)	Summary	Slogic (yellow card) 44'; Martínez 46'; Davidson 62'; Berner (yellow card) 86'	Stadium: Goodman Stadium

August 13, 2016 22	Charlotte Independence	1–0	Wilmington Hammerheads FC	Charlotte, North Carolina
7:00pm	Brown 65'	Summary	Taublieb (yellow card) 26'; Binns (yellow card) 42'; Lynch (yellow card) 68'; Mecham (yellow card) 88'	Stadium: Ramblewood Soccer Complex

August 17, 2016 23	Charlotte Independence	4–0	Orlando City B	Charlotte, North Carolina
7:00pm	Slogic 4'; Brown 6' 71'; Martínez 64'; Duckett (yellow card) 67'	Summary	García (yellow card) 11'; Neal (yellow card) 49'; Heath (yellow card) 82'; Ellis-Hayden (yellow card) 84'	Stadium: Ramblewood Soccer Complex

August 27, 2016 24	Charleston Battery	1–0	Charlotte Independence	Charleston, South Carolina
7:30pm	Chang 50'; Tsonis (yellow card) 90+1'	Summary		Stadium: MUSC Health Stadium

August 31, 2016 25	Charlotte Independence	3–2	FC Cincinnati	Charlotte, North Carolina
7:00pm	Martínez 11' 19' (yellow card) 65'; Martínez (yellow card) 56'; Duckett (yellow card) 79'; Herrera 85'; Hassan (yellow card) 90+2'	Summary	Wiedeman 15'; Antón Ripoll (yellow card) 31'; Bone (yellow card) 35'; Berry (yellow card) 54'; Okoli 60'; Walker (yellow card) 69'	Stadium: Ramblewood Soccer Complex

September 4, 2016 26	Toronto FC II	v	Charlotte Independence	Vaughan, Ontario
4:00pm				Stadium: Ontario Soccer Centre

September 10, 2016 27	Charlotte Independence	v	Pittsburgh Riverhounds	Charlotte, North Carolina
7:00pm				Stadium: Ramblewood Soccer Complex

September 14, 2016 28	Richmond Kickers	v	Charlotte Independence	Richmond
4:00pm				Stadium: City Stadium

September 17, 2016 29	Charlotte Independence	v	Rochester Rhinos	Charlotte, North Carolina
7:00pm				Stadium: Ramblewood Soccer Complex

September 24, 2016 30	Louisville City FC	v	Charlotte Independence	Louisville, Kentucky
7:30pm				Stadium: Louisville Slugger Field

Schedule source

=== U.S. Open Cup ===
May 18, 2016 Second Round	Charlotte Eagles	0–2	Charlotte Independence	Charlotte, North Carolina
7:00pm		Report	Hellmann 44'; Herrera 50'	Stadium: Charlotte Christian School; Referee: Gustavo Solorio

June 1, 2016 Third Round	Carolina RailHawks	5–0 (a.e.t.)	Charlotte Independence	Cary, North Carolina
7:30pm	Schuler 92', 115'; Albadawi 96'; Shriver 99'; Orlando 109'			Stadium: WakeMed Soccer Park; Referee: Neil Barbulescu

=== Friendlies ===
July 13, 2016 International friendly	Charlotte Independence (United States)	0–4	(Wales) Swansea City A.F.C.	Charlotte, North Carolina
7:30pm		Report	McBurnie 27'; Routledge 52'; Routledge 73'; Gorre 81'	Stadium: Ramblewood Soccer Complex
