= Junior Burgos =

Salvadoran footballer (born 1988)

Personal information
- Full name: Efraín Antonio Burgos Jr.
- Date of birth: 14 August 1988 (age 38)
- Place of birth: Santa Ana, El Salvador
- Height: 1.80 m (5 ft 11 in)
- Position: Midfielder

College career
Years	Team	Apps	(Gls)
2007–2008	San Jose State Spartans		
2009–2010	Cal Poly Mustangs		

Senior career*
Years	Team	Apps	(Gls)
2008	San Francisco Seals		
2009	Bakersfield Brigade		
2010	Chicago Fire U-23		
2012	Toronto FC	28	(4)
2014	Atlanta Silverbacks	22	(7)
2015	Jaguares de Córdoba	11	(0)
2015	Orange County Blues	12	(2)
2015	Atlanta Silverbacks	30	(7)
2016	Atlanta United	0	(0)
2016	→ Tampa Bay Rowdies (loan)	14	(5)
2017	Reno 1868	17	(1)
2018	FAS	17	(2)
2019	New York Cosmos	28	(15)
2020	Las Vegas Lights	15	(3)
2021	Chalatenango	8	(0)
2021	Alianza	15	(0)

International career
2014–	El Salvador	32	(4)
- * Club domestic league appearances and goals as of 28 April 2021

Efraín Antonio Burgos Jr. (born 14 August 1988), better known as Junior Burgos, is a Salvadoran professional footballer who plays for the El Salvador national team.

== Career ==
=== College and amateur ===
Burgos grew up in San Bruno, California, attended Westmoor High School, and played two years of college soccer at San Jose State University before transferring to California Polytechnic State University in San Luis Obispo, California as a junior in 2008. He scored seven goals in 28 appearances as a Mustang before graduating in the fall of 2010. Burgos became the first Cal Poly player in history to ever be drafted in the MLS SuperDraft.

During his college years Burgos also played in the Premier Development League, for the San Francisco Seals, Bakersfield Brigade and Chicago Fire Premier.

=== Professional ===
On 13 January 2011, Burgos was selected in the third round of the 2011 MLS SuperDraft by Toronto FC. He signed with Toronto FC on 21 March 2012. Burgos made his debut for Toronto as a second half sub for Julian De Guzman against Columbus Crew on March 31, 2012. Burgos was released by Toronto FC on 28 June 2013.

He spent time training abroad including places such as Germany with FC Energie Cottbus of the 2. Bundesliga and Chile with Club Deportivo Universidad Católica. On 26 February 2014, he signed with Atlanta Silverbacks of the North American Soccer League. Burgos led the Silverbacks with 3 goals and 3 assists in the club's historic 2014 Lamar Hunt US Open Cup, eliminating Real Salt Lake and the Colorado Rapids before being eliminated by Chicago Fire in the quarterfinal stage.

On 4 February 2015 it was announced that Burgos had signed to Colombian club Jaguares de Córdoba, which plays in the Categoría Primera A Colombians highest league, where he would rejoin former Silverbacks teammate Junior Sandoval.

He decided to part ways with the Colombian side after the club refused to meet the terms of the signed contract between both parties. Shortly after, he signed temporarily with Orange County Blues FC of USL in April 2015, as a transition move before the summer window opened up.

After appearing in 4 games for Orange County Blues, Burgos rejoined Atlanta Silverbacks on 7 July 2015. Burgos, went on to score 4 goals and 6 assists making it a successful return to Atlanta. Burgos free kick goal vs San Antonio was nominated as the 2015 NASL Goal of the year. He was presented with an award during half time at the NASL Championship match.

On 2 February 2016 it was announced that Burgos signed with Major League Soccer's Atlanta United FC, becoming the second signing in the club's history, ahead of their 2017 MLS debut. Burgos was loaned out to the Tampa Bay Rowdies for the 2016 campaign in the North American Soccer League.

On 4 March 2020, Burgos joined USL Championship side Las Vegas Lights FC ahead of the 2020 season.

Burgos joined Chalatenango on 25 February 2021.

=== International ===
Burgos is a member of El Salvador's national team. He made his international debut on 30 August 2014 vs Dominican Republic, where he assisted on the 2–0 win. Burgos a member of the 2009 World Cup qualifier roster that saw him feature in the Hexagonal stage vs United States, Panama and Costa Rica becoming the youngest member of the National team to be rostered in their road to the 2010 South Africa World Cup.

In September 2014, Burgos was named to the UNCAF cup 21 men roster, where he featured in the 1–0 win over Honduras.

Burgos featured in two CONCACAF Gold Cups in 2015 and 2017, El Salvador would go on to the quarterfinal stage Vs the United States after defeating Curacao and Jamaica.

Burgos went on to represent his country in 32 international games including games vs Brazil, Spain, Argentina, Colombia, Chile and Ivory Coast. His last international game was Vs Iceland in a 1-0 win in 2020.

=== International goals ===
Scores and results list Italy's goal tally first.

Goal	Date	Venue	Opponent	Score	Result	Competition
1.	18 November 2014	Estadio Independencia, Esteli, Nicaragua	Nicaragua	0–1	0–2	Friendly

== Personal life ==
Burgos has one older sister, Sofia, and two younger siblings, Gerardo and Fatima. His mother is Morena Del Carmen de Burgos and his father is Salvadoran international Efrain Burgos, who played professional football for 16 years, mainly for Salvadoran clubs.

== Honours ==
=== Toronto FC ===
- Canadian Championship (1): 2012
