= Alex Harlley =

Togolese association footballer

Personal information
- Full name: Alex Nyarko Harlley
- Date of birth: 28 June 1992 (age 34)
- Place of birth: Togo
- Height: 6 ft 2 in (1.88 m)
- Position: Midfielder

Team information
- Current team: Georgia Revolution

Youth career
- 2012–2013: Yavapai College

Senior career*
Years	Team	Apps	(Gls)
2011–2013	FC Santa Clarita		
2014–2015	Atlanta Silverbacks	21	(0)
2016	Pittsburgh Riverhounds	5	(0)
2017–2018	Atlanta Silverbacks	1	(0)
2018	Georgia Revolution	7	(2)
2019	Las Vegas Lights	4	(1)
2019–	Georgia Revolution	7	(3)
- * Club domestic league appearances and goals as of 10:28, 30 April 2019 (UTC)

Alex Harlley (born 28 June 1992) is a Togolese professional footballer who plays as a midfielder for Georgia Revolution. He is the nephew of Emmanuel Adebayor.

== Career ==
Harlley arrived in the U.S. at age 18. While he finished his final two years of high school at Rosamond High School, he tied or broke school records in most categories and won MVP awards and all-league honors. The team reached the playoffs following both seasons and won one CIF title. After graduation, he was recruited by NCAA Division I schools, particularly University of California, Irvine. However, he was ineligible to join a Division 1 school and eventually earned a full scholarship to Yavapai College. He was a standout at Yavapai College, tallying 22 goals and 17 assists in 23 matches during his only season with the team. In 2012, he was invited for a trial with VSI Tampa Bay FC of the USL Pro by head coach Matt Weston. He played in the NPSL for FC Santa Clarita for three seasons from 2011 to 2013. In 2012, he tallied twelve assists and six goals for the club. He was first signed by the club after being spotted by Eric Wynalda.

On 5 March 2014 Harlley was signed by professional side Atlanta Silverbacks of the North American Soccer League. He made his professional debut on 10 May 2014 against the Fort Lauderdale Strikers. The Silverbacks lost the game 4–0 and Harlley was sent off with a red card.

On 5 January 2015, it was announced that Harlley had signed for the Pittsburgh Riverhounds of the USL.
