= Cody Mizell =

American soccer player

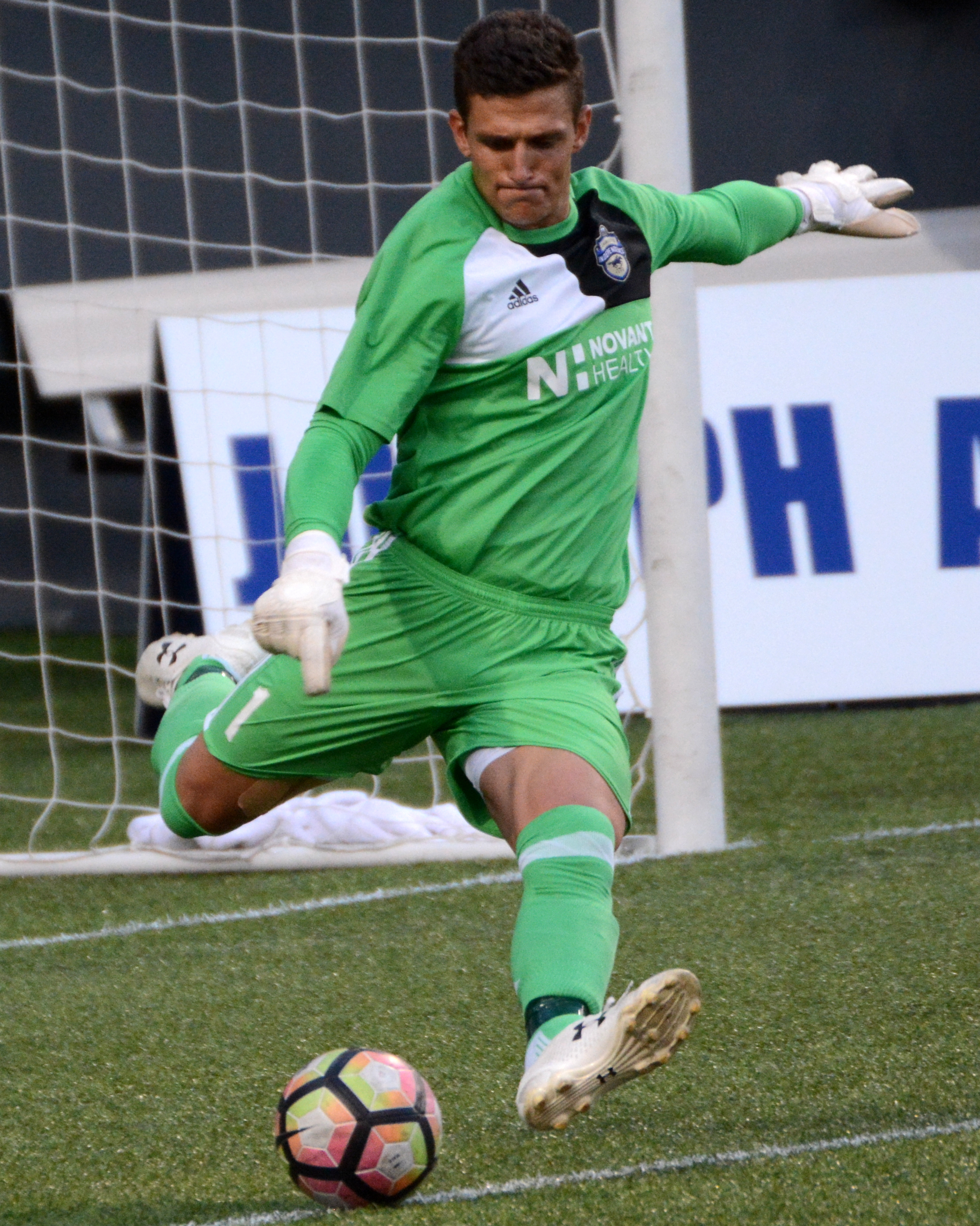
- Mizell with Charlotte Independence in 2017

Personal information
- Full name: Cody Mizell
- Date of birth: September 30, 1991 (age 35)
- Place of birth: Woodstock, Georgia, United States
- Height: 6 ft 1 in (1.85 m)
- Position: Goalkeeper

Team information
- Current team: D.C. United (goalkeeper coach)

College career
Years	Team	Apps	(Gls)
2010–2012	Clemson Tigers	51	(0)

Senior career*
Years	Team	Apps	(Gls)
2013–2014	Tampa Bay Rowdies	5	(0)
2015–2016	Fram Reykjavík	27	(0)
2016–2017	Charlotte Independence	51	(0)
2017	Colorado Rapids	0	(0)
2018	Tampa Bay Rowdies	32	(0)
2019–2020	New Mexico United	56	(0)
2021–2024	New York City FC	25	(0)
2022	→ New Mexico United (loan)	2	(0)

International career
2007–2008	United States U17	11	(0)
2008–2009	United States U18	7	(0)
2009–2010	United States U20	3	(0)

Managerial career
- 2024–: D.C. United (goalkeeper coach)
- * Club domestic league appearances and goals as of April 23, 2022

Cody Mizell (born September 30, 1991) is an American former professional soccer player who played as a goalkeeper. Currently, he is the goalkeeper coach for D.C. United in Major League Soccer.

== College career ==
Mizell attended Clemson University, where he was first choice goalkeeper for all three seasons, winning numerous All-American and All-ACC awards as a Tiger. He was named an NCAA All-American and team Most Valuable Player as a true Freshman in 2010.

== Professional career ==
=== Atlanta Silverbacks ===
On May 16, 2013, Mizell signed with NASL club Atlanta Silverbacks. Mizell made his professional debut against the New York Cosmos shortly after joining the club. He went on to help Atlanta win the NASL Spring season title and a berth in the 2013 NASL Soccer Bowl.

=== Tampa Bay Rowdies ===
On March 27, 2014, Mizell signed a two-year contract with NASL club Tampa Bay Rowdies following a successful trial. He made his debut with the Rowdies on May 24, 2014, in a 3–2 win against rival side Fort Lauderdale Strikers. After making five appearances for the Rowdies in 2014, Mizell and Tampa Bay exercised an option in his contract to terminate it to explore future club considerations.

=== Knattspyrnufélagið Fram ===
Mizell signed a contract with Knattspyrnufélagið Fram of Iceland early in 2015. Mizell became an instant starter upon arrival at the historic club, and was named to Iceland's best eleven on May 22, 2015.

=== Charlotte Independence ===
Mizell was transferred to United Soccer League side Charlotte Independence on January 1, 2016. After a stellar year in 2017, Mizell was nominated for the USL Goalkeeper of the Year award at the end of the regular season.

=== Colorado Rapids ===
On March 2, 2017, Mizell was signed by the Colorado Rapids of Major League Soccer from the Charlotte Independence. Mizell made an appearance on the bench in the season opener before being loaned to the Independence to start the 2017 United Soccer League season.

=== Tampa Bay Rowdies ===
Mizell began his second stint with the Rowdies on January 5, 2018.

=== New Mexico United ===
On November 6, 2018, New Mexico United announced Cody Mizell as one of the first six signed players in club history, under the guidance of Head Coach Troy Lesesne.

=== New York City FC ===
On March 4, 2021, Mizell was purchased by Major League Soccer club New York City FC for an undisclosed transfer fee, signing him through the 2022 season. He returned to New Mexico United on a short-term loan deal on April 15, 2022. After two appearances he returned to NYCFC.

== International career ==
Mizell capped multiple times for the U.S. under-17 national team, making his debut against England U17 at the 35th Mondial Minimes International Tournament in Les Essarts, France. He continued with the youth national team system appearing for the U.S. Under-18 national team and the U.S. under-20 national team.

== Career statistics ==
As of April 23, 2022

Appearances by club, season, and competition
Club	Season	League			Domestic cup		League cup		Continental		Total	
Club	Season	Division	Apps	Goals	Apps	Goals	Apps	Goals	Apps	Goals	Apps	Goals
Atlanta Silverbacks	2013	NASL	1	0	0	0	—		—		1	0
Tampa Bay Rowdies	2014	NASL	4	0	1 (Note: Appearance(s) in US Open Cup)	0	—		—		5	0
Knattspyrnufélagið Fram	2015	1. delid	20	0	0	0	0	0	—		20	0
Charlotte Independence	2016	USL	10	0	1	0	0	0	—		11	0
Charlotte Independence	2017	USL	31	0	2	0	1 (Note: Appearance(s) in USL Cup playoffs)	0	—		34	0
Charlotte Independence	Total		41	0	2	0	1	0	—		45	0
Colorado Rapids	2017	MLS	0	0	—		—		—		0	0
Tampa Bay Rowdies	2018	USL	32	0	1	0	—		—		19	0
New Mexico United	2019	USL Championship	33	0	5	0	1 (Note: Appearance(s) in USL Championship playoffs)	0	—		39	0
New Mexico United	2020	USL Championship	15	0	—		2	0	—		17	0
New Mexico United	Total		48	0	5	0	3	0	—		56	0
New York City FC	2021	MLS	0	0	0	0	0	0	0	0	0	0
New York City FC	2022	MLS	0	0	0	0	0	0	0	0	0	0
New York City FC	Total		0	0	0	0	0	0	0	0	0	0
New Mexico United (loan)	2022	USL Championship	2	0	0	0	—		—		2	0
Career total			152	0	10	0	4	0	0	0	148	0

== Honors ==
New York City FC

- MLS Cup: 2021
- Campeones Cup: 2022

Individual

- Inkasso-Deildin Team of the Season: 2015
