= Janny Rivera =

Colombian footballer (born 1988)

Personal information
- Full name: Janny Rivera
- Date of birth: 16 August 1988 (age 38)
- Place of birth: Colombia
- Height: 1.70 m (5 ft 7 in)
- Position: Midfielder

Team information
- Current team: Atlanta Silverbacks
- Number: 20

Youth career
- South Carolina Gamecocks
- Clayton State Lakers

Senior career*
Years	Team	Apps	(Gls)
2012	Atlanta Silverbacks Reserves		
2014–	Atlanta Silverbacks	3	(0)
- * Club domestic league appearances and goals

Janny Rivera (born 16 August 1988) is a Colombian professional footballer who plays for Atlanta Silverbacks as a midfielder.

== Career ==
Born in Colombia, Rivera was an NSCAA All American at Louisburg College (NC) and played his junior year at University of South Carolina before joining Clayton State.

Rivera also spent 2012 with the Atlanta Silverbacks Reserves before he signed a contract with the pro club Atlanta Silverbacks in March 2014.

Janny made his professional debut on 19 April 2014 at home against the San Antonio Scorpions. The Silverbacks lost the game 2-1 and Rivera was cautioned with a yellow card.
