= Mitch Garcia =

American soccer player

Personal information
- Full name: Mitchell Garcia
- Date of birth: 7 April 1989 (age 37)
- Place of birth: Phoenix, Arizona, United States
- Height: 1.78 m (5 ft 10 in)
- Positions: Left back; midfielder

Team information
- Current team: Dallas Sidekicks
- Number: 18

College career
Years	Team	Apps	(Gls)
2009	Phoenix College Bears		
2010–2011	Grand Canyon Antelopes	38	(8)

Senior career*
Years	Team	Apps	(Gls)
2010–2011	Arizona Sahuaros		
2011–2013	Arizona Storm (indoor)	18	(16)
2013	FC Tucson	1	(0)
2013	Vermont Voltage	10	(0)
2014	Atlanta Silverbacks	3	(0)
2015	Atlanta Silverbacks Reserves	10	(0)
2016	Carolina Railhawks		
2016	St. Louis Ambush (indoor)	14	(3)
2017	Atlanta Silverbacks	12	(1)
2019	Atlanta SC	10	(1)

Managerial career
- 2018–: Atlanta Silverbacks (assistant)
- * Club domestic league appearances and goals as of May 15, 2017

Mitchell "Mitch" Garcia (born April 7, 1989) is an American professional soccer player.

== Career ==
=== College and Youth ===
Garcia started at Phoenix College in 2009, before transferring to Grand Canyon University in 2010.

While at college, Garcia also appeared for NPSL club Arizona Sahuaros.

=== Professional ===
After leaving college, Garcia trained with Polish side Puszcza Niepołomice and Serbian club FK Čukarički, but was signed by neither.

Garcia played with USL PDL club's FC Tucson and Vermont Voltage in 2013, before signing his first professional contract with NASL club Atlanta Silverbacks on February 26, 2014. He made his professional debut on June 7, 2014, against Indy Eleven. He started and played 90 minutes with the result ending in a 3–3 tie
