= Ryan Roushandel =

American soccer player and coach (born 1985)

Personal information
- Full name: Ryan Massoud Roushandel
- Date of birth: November 11, 1985 (age 41)
- Place of birth: Atlanta, Georgia, United States
- Height: 1.90 m (6 ft 3 in)
- Position: Midfielder

Team information
- Current team: San Antonio FC (assistant)

College career
Years	Team	Apps	(Gls)
2004–2005	Clemson Tigers		
2006–2008	UCF Knights	53	(13)

Senior career*
Years	Team	Apps	(Gls)
2009	Atlanta Blackhawks		
2009–2010	Brujas FC	8	(0)
2011	Sevilla FC Puerto Rico	6	(2)
2012	Atlanta Silverbacks Reserves	2	(0)
2014	Atlanta Silverbacks	24	(1)
2015	Austin Aztex	13	(0)
2016–2018	San Antonio FC	34	(1)
2016	→ Wilmington Hammerheads (loan)	1	(0)
2019	San Antonio FC	1	(0)

Managerial career
- 2012: UCF Knights (assistant)
- 2013–2014: Oglethorpe Stormy Petrels (assistant)
- 2019–: San Antonio FC (assistant)
- * Club domestic league appearances and goals as of 02:30, 15 September 2019 (UTC)

Ryan Massoud Roushandel (born November 11, 1985) is an American soccer player and coach.

== Youth career ==
Roushandel started his collegiate career at Clemson University, going all the way to the semifinals of the NCAA Tournament as a redshirt freshman. After two years at Clemson, Roushandel opted to use his final three years of eligibility at the University of Central Florida.

== Club career ==
After stints in Costa Rica with Brujas FC and Puerto Rico with Sevilla FC Puerto Rico, Roushandel returned to the US, where he coached with UCF Knights and Oglethorpe Stormy Petrels.

Roushandel signed with NASL club Atlanta Silverbacks in 2014.

On May 5, 2016, Roushandel signed for San Antonio FC. He joined Wilmington Hammerheads on a one-game loan on July 30, 2016.

Roushandel retired in 2019, in order to join San Antonio FC's coaching staff.

However, Roushandel came out of retirement on September 14, 2019, playing thirty minutes of a 3–1 win over Oklahoma City Energy.
