= Montreat College =

Christian college in Montreat, North Carolina, US

Coordinates: 35°38′46″N 82°17′51″W

- Former names: Montreat Normal School (1916–1934); Montreat-Anderson College (1959–1995)
- Type: Private college
- Established: 1916; 110 years ago
- Religious affiliation: Christian
- Endowment: $10.2 million
- President: Paul Maurer
- Students: 972
- Location: Montreat, North Carolina, United States
- Campus: 132 acres; Rural
- Nickname: Cavaliers
- Sporting affiliations: NAIA – Appalachian
- Mascot: Calvin the Cavalier
- Website: montreat.edu

Montreat College (Note: /ˈmɒntriːt/ MON-treet) is a private, Christian college in Montreat, North Carolina, United States. Founded in 1916, the college offers associate, bachelor's, and master's degree programs for traditional and adult students. The college's main campus for four-year traditional students is located in the foothills of the Blue Ridge Mountains outside of Asheville, North Carolina.

== History ==
In 1897 Congregationalist minister John C. Collins, from New Haven, Connecticut, joined with a number of like-minded associates from other denominations, including evangelist Weston R. Gales, to form the Mountain Retreat Association. "The corporation was not owned by one denomination but it was interdenominational in its makeup without church connection or control. The original Montreat idea has changed, grown and developed into what now is. Its name was derived from the words 'Mountain Retreat.'"

The original organization stated its purpose as follows:

to establish and maintain in the mountain section of North Carolina, a municipality containing assembly grounds for the encouragement of Christian work and living through Christian convention, public worship, missionary work, schools, libraries, orphan homes, manual and trades training and other operations auxiliary and incidental thereto; also a community and health resort with places for dwellings, permanently and temporarily, for health, rest, recreation, Christian work and fellowship, together with whatever may be connected therewith, directly or incidentally.

Today the name Montreat is used for at least three different entities including Montreat College. The original Mountain Retreat Association was adapted as a Presbyterian conference center fewer than ten years after its founding. J. R. Howerton of Charlotte, North Carolina, purchased Montreat for use by the Presbyterian Church in the United States (also known informally as the Southern Presbyterian Church).

In 1913, Robert C. Anderson, then president of the Mountain Retreat Association, proposed that the grounds and facilities of the Association be used for a school during the academic year. In 1915, an Ad Interim Committee of the General Assembly of the Presbyterian Church, U.S. reported:

1. We have made a careful examination of the Montreat property, and believe that it could be made suitable for school purposes by installing heating facilities and adding up-to-date school equipment. In this way provision could easily be made for 350 to 400 pupils. 2. We have carefully considered the various schools within the bounds of our General Assembly and under the control of the various Synods and Presbyteries, and we believe that one need of our ecclesiastical school system is a Christian Normal School for Teachers. We believe that Montreat is well located and adapted for a school of this nature.

Montreat Normal School opened in October 1916. Anderson served as the first president. According to the Asheville Citizen, the school's purpose, in addition to training girls for teaching careers, was "to give Christian education to worthy girls of junior college and high school age who desire education and whose character and purpose assure the best use of it."

Having been granted a charter by the State of North Carolina in January 1917, the Mountain Retreat Association 'Managing Committee' voted in July of that year to provide buildings, grounds and equipment to the school for eight months per year. The school was to be responsible for paying for the utilities it used and for ordinary repairs.

In this way the predecessor to Montreat College was created as a part of the Mountain Retreat Association to make year-round use of the facilities previously used only for summer conferences. But from the beginning, "the accounts of the Mountain Retreat Association and Montreat College were kept separate. No money was ever transferred from one to the other."

In 1934 Montreat College became a junior college. Later, the college offered a four-year curriculum. By the late 1950s, it reverted to junior college status.

The Town of Montreat was founded in 1967 after the Mountain Retreat Association chose to give up maintaining the infrastructure of the retreat center. The Board of Directors voluntarily agreed to surrender "all municipal powers and functions and permit Montreat to be governed by the laws of Buncombe County and the State of North Carolina."

Among the school's benefactors over the years were evangelist Billy Graham and his wife, Ruth Graham, who lived in the community. They were actively involved with the school's students for many years. During a time when the school's identity was being defined, the Grahams gave a total of $150,000 over a period of three years.

In 1962 Calvin Thielman, who had been living in Montreat for some time as a Special Assistant to Billy Graham, was called as Pastor of the Montreat Presbyterian Church. At the same time, he served as the first chaplain to students at Montreat-Anderson College. He held both of these jobs until 1992, when Ed Bonner was called as college chaplain. Thielman continued as Pastor of the Church until his retirement in 1995.

In 1975 the college and the Mountain Retreat Association conference center formed two separate organizations: Vaughn served as College President and Monroe Ashley, a Baptist minister who had done extensive work in camp and conference ministry, served as the President of the Mountain Retreat Association.

In the 1980s, Montreat was expanded again to offer a four-year curriculum. Later it also offered graduate programs. In the 1990s, it expanded the number of sites where it offered classes, in addition to offerings online.

After the Great Recession of 2008, Montreat College had financial problems. In 2013, it considered a merger with Point University. This idea was later dropped.

In March 2014, after a $6 million anonymous gift, trustees decided to raise money and hire a new president. Paul J. Maurer took office the next summer.

=== Presidents ===
- Robert Campbell Anderson (1916–1947)
- J. Rupert McGregor (1947–1957)
- Calvin Grier Davis (1959–1972)
- Silas M. Vaughn (1972–1991)
- William W. Hurt (1991–2002)
- John S. Lindberg (2002–2003)
- Dan Struble (2004–2013)
- Paul Maurer (2014 to present)

== Campus ==
Many of the older buildings are constructed of stone. In the early days Emilie Miller Vaughan described it thus: "I wish I could tell you of the scenery around here & at the retreat. People who have travelled say it is only equaled by Switzerland"

== Academic profile ==
Montreat College's traditional program has almost 700 students. It has more than 90 majors, minors, and concentrations.

The School of Adult and Graduate Studies began offering classes on September 19, 1994. With online programs and physical campuses in Asheville, Charlotte, and Morganton, the college seeks to serve adults in the work force, or who are retired, who want to earn a college degree, as well as those who want to expand their horizons. In June 1998 Montreat College was accredited by the Commission on Colleges of the Southern Association of Colleges and Schools as a level three institution to offer the master's degree in business administration. This accreditation was reaffirmed in December 2012.

== Student life ==
As of the fall of 2021, Montreat's traditional campus student body consists of 662 undergraduate students. The School of Adult and Graduate Studies consists of 311 adult undergraduate, graduate, and online students.

== Athletics ==
The Montreat athletic teams are called the Cavaliers. The college is a member of the National Association of Intercollegiate Athletics (NAIA), primarily competing in the Appalachian Athletic Conference (AAC) since the 2001–02 academic year. They were also a member of the National Christian College Athletic Association (NCCAA), primarily competing as an independent in the South Region of the Division II level.

Montreat competes in 22 intercollegiate varsity sports: Men's sports include baseball, basketball, cross country, golf, lacrosse, soccer, tennis, track & field and wrestling; while women's sports include basketball, cross country, golf, lacrosse, soccer, softball, tennis, track & field, volleyball and wrestling; and co-ed sports include competitive cheer, competitive dance and clay target shooting.

== Notable alumni ==
- Abdul Bangura, professional soccer player
- Joseph Chambers, minister
- Cylk Cozart, actor, director, writer, and producer
- Carlos Crawford, MLB pitcher
- William R. Forstchen, author and faculty member
- Franklin Graham, evangelist and missionary
- Sammy Stewart, MLB pitcher
