= Derby Carrillo =

Salvadoran goalkeeper (born 1987)

Personal information
- Full name: Derby Rafael Carrillo Berduo
- Date of birth: September 19, 1987 (age 39)
- Place of birth: La Mirada, California, United States
- Height: 6 ft 4 in (1.93 m)
- Position: Goalkeeper

College career
| Years | Team | Apps | (Gls) |
| 2005–2007 | Cal State Dominguez Hills Toros | | |
| 2008–2009 | St. John's Red Storm | | |

Senior career*
| Years | Team | Apps | (Gls) |
| 2009 | Newark Express | 2 | (0) |
| 2010 | Kitsap Pumas | 1 | (0) |
| 2011 | FC New York | 6 | (0) |
| 2012 | Cal FC | 8 | (0) |
| 2012–2013 | Santa Tecla FC | 33 | (0) |
| 2014 | Atlanta Silverbacks | 4 | (0) |
| 2014–2015 | Santa Tecla FC | 40 | (0) |
| 2016–2018 | ÍBV | 54 | (0) |
| 2018–2019 | Santa Tecla | 5 | (1) |
| 2020–2021 | Cobán Imperial | 12 | (0) |
| 2021–2022 | Atlético Marte | 27 | (0) |

International career
| 2013–2017 | El Salvador | 19 | (0) |
- * Club domestic league appearances and goals

Derby Rafael Carrillo Berduo (born September 19, 1987) is a Salvadoran professional goalkeeper.

== Early life and education ==
Carrillo was born in La Mirada, California and attended St. John Bosco High School. He began playing college soccer at California State University, Dominguez Hills, where he posted a 13-3-1 record in two seasons with the Toros after redshirting as a freshman. He was named a Daktronics first team All-American, a first team All-Region selection, a first team CCAA selection, and an NCAA Far West All-Tournament Team selection in 2007.

Before his junior year, Carrillo transferred to St. John's University. At St. John's he played two years, as a backup on the Red Storm's College Cup squad in 2008 and starting all 21 games during the 2009 season, going 9–3–9.

While in college, Carrillo played in the USL Premier Development League for the Newark Ironbound Express.

== Career ==
Carrillo attended Major League Soccer's (MLS) 2010 Arizona training camp with Seattle Sounders FC. He made an impression on the coaching staff, and was asked to accompany the team to their Spain preseason camp. After the training camp, the coaching staff asked him to return to Seattle with them to train for the 2010 season and play games with Kitsap Pumas, a local P.D.L. team. Carrillo trained with the Sounders, and signed and played with the Pumas.

In 2011, Carrillo signed with F.C. New York of the USL Professional Division, and made his debut on April 9, 2011, in New York's first-ever game, which was a 3–0 loss to Orlando City.

Eric Wynalda chose Carrillo to be part of the Cal Football Club in 2012, where they competed in the 2012 Lamar Hunt U.S. Open Cup and pulled off an upset by beating MLS' Portland Timbers. He signed to play for Santa Tecla before the 2012 Apertura. He also trained in camps with El Salvador youth teams. On March 26, 2014, he signed with Atlanta Silverbacks of the NASL.

== Honours ==
Santa Tecla

- Salvadoran Primera División: Clausura 2015 Apertura 2018

ÍBV

- Icelandic Cup: 2017
