= Edgar Espinoza =

American professional soccer player

Personal information
- Date of birth: 27 May 1989 (age 37)
- Place of birth: Los Angeles, California, United States
- Height: 1.83 m (6 ft 0 in)
- Position: Defender

College career
Years	Team	Apps	(Gls)
- Compton Tartars
- Kansas Wesleyan Coyotes

Senior career*
Years	Team	Apps	(Gls)
2011–2013	Los Angeles Misioneros	25	(0)
2014	Atlanta Silverbacks	16	(0)
2015	Cal FC		
2016	Shirak	0	(0)
2016	Tulsa Roughnecks	11	(0)
2017	Golden State Force	0	(0)
- * Club domestic league appearances and goals as of May 7, 2020

Edgar Espinoza (born May 27, 1989) is an American professional soccer player who plays as a defender.

== Career ==
=== Early career ===
Espinoza started his collegiate career with Compton College before transferring to Kansas Wesleyan University where he played for the Kansas Wesleyan Coyotes. He then signed for the Los Angeles Misioneros of the USL Premier Development League.

=== Atlanta Silverbacks ===
On March 6, 2014, it was announced that Espinoza had signed with the Atlanta Silverbacks of the North American Soccer League. He made his professional debut for the side on April 13, 2014, against the New York Cosmos. He started and played 74 minutes as the Silverbacks lost 4–0. On February 13, 2015, it was announce that Edgar had left the Silverbacks.

=== Tulsa Roughnecks ===
Espinoza signed for Tulsa Roughnecks on 28 July 2016, having previously been with FC Shirak in Armenia.

== Career statistics ==
As of March 23, 2016

Club	Season	League			League Cup		US Open Cup		CONCACAF		Total	
Club	Season	Division	Apps	Goals	Apps	Goals	Apps	Goals	Apps	Goals	Apps	Goals
Atlanta Silverbacks	2014	NASL	16	0	—	—	0	0	—	—	16	0
Career total			16	0	0	0	0	0	0	0	16	0
