= Pablo Cruz (soccer) =

American soccer player

Pablito Cruz
Personal information
- Full name: Pablo Cruz Jr.
- Date of birth: December 30, 1991 (age 34)
- Place of birth: Pasadena, California, United States
- Height: 1.70 m (5 ft 7 in)
- Positions: Attacking midfielder; winger

Youth career
- Barcelona USA CZ Elite
- 2008–2010: LAFC Chelsea

Senior career*
Years	Team	Apps	(Gls)
2012	Cal FC		
2012–2014	Atlanta Silverbacks	51	(7)
2015	San Antonio Scorpions	2	(0)
2015–2016	FC Edmonton	19	(0)
2016	Orange County Blues	5	(0)
2017	California United	40	(16)
2018	Shirak	10	(2)
2019	Las Vegas Lights	30	(1)
2021	Detroit City	1	(0)

International career
2007–2008	United States U17	7	(2)
2007	United States U20		
- * Club domestic league appearances and goals as of July 1, 2024

Pablito "Pablo" Cruz (born December 30, 1991) is an American soccer player.

== Career ==
Cruz signed with the Atlanta Silverbacks in 2012 and made 52 appearances for them over a three-year period until a transfer to the San Antonio Scorpions. After a brief stint in Texas, Cruz signed with FC Edmonton on June 19, 2015. On July 29, 2016, FC Edmonton announced that the club and Cruz had mutually agreed to part ways. In total, Cruz made 19 appearances for the Eddies.

Cruz joined California United FC II in 2017 and was a key contributor to the teams National Championship victories in both the United Premier Soccer League Spring & Fall Seasons.

In October 2018, Cruz and fellow American Eder Arreola left Shirak SC.

On January 9, 2019, Cruz signed for USL Championship side Las Vegas Lights.

On March 1, 2021, Cruz joined National Independent Soccer Association side Detroit City.

== International career ==
Cruz was selected to be a part of the 07-08 Under 17 US National Team.

In total, he appeared in 7 matches and scored 2 goals, but has not made an international appearance since that 07–08 season.

He also was in the Under 20 squad.
