= Abdul Bangura =

Sierra Leonean footballer

Personal information
- Full name: Abdulrahman Bangura
- Date of birth: 10 January 1986 (age 40)
- Place of birth: Freetown, Sierra Leone
- Height: 1.85 m (6 ft 1 in)
- Position: Defender

Youth career
- Montreat College

Senior career*
Years	Team	Apps	(Gls)
2011–2013	Härnösands FF		
2014–2015	Atlanta Silverbacks	17	(0)

International career^{‡}
2014–	Sierra Leone	1	(0)
- * Club domestic league appearances and goals as of 22 February 2016 ‡ National team caps and goals as of 24 June 2014 (UTC)

Abdulrahman Bangura (born 10 January 1986) is a Sierra Leonean footballer. He is a central defender who last played for Atlanta Silverbacks.

== Career ==
=== Atlanta FC ===
Bangura played with Atlanta FC in the NPSL from 2008 to 2010, featuring at all positions on the backline and in defensive midfield.

=== Härnösands FF ===
Born in Sierra Leone, Bangura moved to the U.S. as a teenager. He went on to play at the collegiate level at Montreat College, a NAIA school in North Carolina. Bangura spent two full seasons with Swedish club Härnösands FF, and was the only player on the team to appear in every single game from 2011 to 2013. He was also named to the league's Best XI, occupying one of its three defensive spots.

=== Atlanta Silverbacks ===
Bangura signed a professional contract with the Atlanta Silverbacks on 28 February 2014. He made his debut with the club as a substitute in the 89th minute away against FC Edmonton. The Silverbacks won the game 2-1.

Abdul made his first start with the club on 31 May 2014 against Minnesota United FC. He played the full 90 minutes, however Atlanta lost the game 2-1 at home.

== International ==
Bangura was called up to the Sierra Leone national team for their two fixtures in the 2015 Africa Cup of Nations qualification against Seychelles. He got his first cap and played the first match in Freetown. Sierra Leone won the game 2-0.

== Personal life ==
He is the cousin of Shaka Bangura, his teammate at Atlanta Silverbacks.
