= Junior Sandoval =

Honduran footballer (born 1990)

Personal information
- Full name: Junior Josué Sandoval López
- Date of birth: October 13, 1990 (age 36)
- Place of birth: Quimistán, Honduras
- Height: 5 ft 11 in (1.80 m)
- Positions: Midfielder; forward

Team information
- Current team: Kalonji Pro-Profile

College career
Years	Team	Apps	(Gls)
2009	GPC Jaguars		

Senior career*
Years	Team	Apps	(Gls)
2008–2009	Atlanta FC	10	(0)
2010–2011	Puerto Rico Islanders	7	(0)
2011–2012	→ Atlanta Silverbacks (loan)	15	(2)
2012–2013	Marathón	13	(1)
2013–2014	Atlanta Silverbacks	23	(7)
2015–2016	Jaguares de Córdoba	14	(1)
2016–	Jacksonville Armada FC	16	(2)
2016–2017	Fort Lauderdale Strikers	5	(1)
2017–2018	California United FC II		
2018–2019	Kalonji Pro-Profile		
2019	Memphis 901	4	(0)
2019–2020	Las Vegas Lights	34	(5)
2021–	Kalonji Pro-Profile		
- * Club domestic league appearances and goals as of May 13, 2021

Junior Josué Sandoval López (born October 13, 1990) is a Honduran footballer who currently plays for Kalonji Pro-Profile in the United Premier Soccer League.

== Career ==
=== Youth and college ===
Sandoval grew up in Alpharetta, Georgia and attended Centennial High School in Roswell, Georgia before playing a year of college soccer at Georgia Perimeter College. He was the Jaguars' leading scorer as a freshman with 29 points on nine goals and 11 assists, and was named to the NJCAA All-Region First Team.

Sandoval also played two seasons with Atlanta FC of the National Premier Soccer League, including their Lamar Hunt US Open Cup match against Charleston Battery in 2009.

=== Professional ===
Sandoval left college early and joined Puerto Rico Islanders on February 17, 2010. He made his professional debut on April 18, 2010, in a 2010 CFU Club Championship game against Haitian side Racing des Gonaïves. Puerto Rico loaned Sandoval to Atlanta Silverbacks of the North American Soccer League on March 31, 2011. Puerto Rico ended Sandoval's loan to Atlanta on August 12, 2011.

Sandoval returned to Atlanta and joined the Atlanta Silverbacks Reserves for the first part of the 2012 season. After 4 games, he signed for Marathón in his native Honduras.

In January 2016, Sandoval signed with Jacksonville Armada FC of the NASL. Following the 2016, he signed to play the 2017 season for California United FC II.

After being released from the Las Vegas Lights following the 2020 USL Championship season, Sandoval returned to Georgia to play with United Premier Soccer League club Kalonji Pro-Profile.

== Honors ==
=== Puerto Rico Islanders ===
- CFU Club Championship Winner (1): 2010
