= Jesus Gonzalez (soccer, born 1991) =

American soccer player

Personal information
- Full name: Jesus Gonzalez
- Date of birth: September 19, 1991 (age 35)
- Place of birth: Pasadena, California, United States
- Height: 1.80 m (5 ft 11 in)
- Positions: Defender; midfielder

Team information
- Current team: Los Angeles Force
- Number: 70

Youth career
- Fc Barcelona Pasadena, CA: /CZ Elite
- 2004–2011: Mt. San Antonio College

Senior career*
Years	Team	Apps	(Gls)
2009- 2011	Tigres UANL Liga MX	47	(2)
2012–2015	Atlanta Silverbacks	42	(4)
2017	California United FC II	32	(6)
2018	Orange County FC	18	(3)
2019	Las Vegas Lights	12	(1)
2019–	Los Angeles Force	12	(4)

International career^{‡}
USMNT	U-17s- U-20s	28	(0)
- * Club domestic league appearances and goals as of October 15, 2020 ‡ National team caps and goals as of November 3, 2013

Jesus Gonzalez (born September 19, 1991) is an American soccer player who plays for the Los Angeles Force in the National Independent Soccer Association.

== Career ==
On August 2, 2013, Gonzalez signed a professional contract with NASL club Atlanta Silverbacks

In 2017, Gonzalez joined California United FC II and was a key contributor to the club, securing the 2017 Spring & Fall United Premier Soccer League National Championships.
