= 2015 New York Cosmos season =

New York Cosmos
2015 season
- Chairman: Seamus O'Brien
- Head coach: Giovanni Savarese
- Stadium: Shuart Stadium; MCU Park (One Game); Belson Stadium (U.S. Open Cup 3rd Round)
- NASL: Spring: Champions Fall: 3rd Place Combined: 1st Place
- Soccer Bowl: Champions
- U.S. Open Cup: 5th Round
- Top goalscorer: League: Raúl (9); All: Leo Fernandes (10)
- Highest home attendance: 12,550 (Apr. 18 vs. Tampa Bay, at Shuart Stadium)
- Lowest home attendance: League: 3,383 (May 10 vs. Edmonton, at Shuart Stadium); All: 1,394 (May 27 vs. Jersey, at Belson Stadium)
- Average home league attendance: League: 6,207; All: 6,261
Home colors	Away colors	Third colors

The 2015 New York Cosmos season was the new Cosmos' third season of existence, playing in the new North American Soccer League. Including the previous franchise, this is the seventeenth season of a club entitled New York Cosmos playing professional soccer in the New York metropolitan area.

== Club ==
=== Roster ===
As of April 2, 2015.

No.	Position	Nation	Player
1	GK	USA	Jimmy Maurer
2	DF	USA	Hunter Freeman
3	DF	USA	Hunter Gorskie
4	DF	USA	Carlos Mendes (Captain)
5	DF	PAR	Samuel Cáceres (on loan from Nueva Chicago)
6	DF	BRA	Rovérsio
7	FW	ESP	Raúl
11	MF	SLV	Andrés Flores
12	GK	USA	Kyle Zobeck
13	MF	URU	Sebastián Guenzatti
14	MF	USA	Danny Szetela
16	MF	SCO	Adam Moffat
17	MF	ESP	Ayoze Garcia
18	FW	NOR	Mads Stokkelien
19	MF	ESP	Marcos Senna
20	MF	USA	Walter Restrepo
21	FW	COL	David Diosa
22	MF	BRA	Leo Fernandes (on loan from Philadelphia Union)
23	FW	USA	Haji Wright
25	MF	USA	Hagop Chirishian
28	MF	USA	Jimmy Mulligan
77	FW	ZIM	Lucky Mkosana
—	GK	USA	Keasel Broome
24	GK	USA	Brian Holt

== Competitions ==
=== Pre-season and Exhibitions ===
==== Pre-season ====
19 February 2015 Lunar New Year AET Cup	South China AA (Hong Kong)	2–2 (2–4 p)	(United States) New York Cosmos	Hong Kong
3:30 A.M. EST UTC−5	Chan 19'; Awal 71'	Report	Guenzatti 22'; Flores 88'	Stadium: Hong Kong Stadium; Attendance: 19,522

25 February 2015 Green Thumb Classic	Ventura County Fusion	0–1	New York Cosmos	Ventura, California
10:00 P.M. EST UTC−5		Report	Moffat 15'	Stadium: Ventura College Sportsplex

28 February 2015 Friendly	Sacramento Republic FC	1–3	New York Cosmos	Sacramento, California
10:00 P.M. EST UTC−5	Rivas 90'	Report	Raúl 68'; Fernandes 76'; Flores 81'	Stadium: Charles C. Hughes Stadium; Attendance: 20,231

14 March 2015 Friendly	C.D. FAS (El Salvador)	1–0	(United States) New York Cosmos	San Salvador, El Salvador
EST UTC−5	Corea 26'; Moscoso (yellow card) 61' (yellow-red card)	Report		Stadium: Estadio Cuscatlán; Attendance: 30,000

==== Exhibitions ====
2 June 2015 Friendly	Cuba national team	1–4	(United States) New York Cosmos	Havana, Cuba
17:00 EST UTC−5	Baquero 51'; Cerdeira (yellow card) 57'; Diz (yellow card) 72'	Report	Mkosana 9', 41'; Guenzatti 33'; Chirishian 36'; Ayoze (yellow card) 85'	Stadium: Estadio Pedro Marrero

=== Friendlies goal scorers ===
Place	Position	Nation	Number	Name	Pre-Season	Exhibition	Post-Season	Total
1	MF	(El Salvador)	11	Andrés Flores	2	0	0	2
1	MF	(Uruguay)	13	Sebastián Guenzatti	1	1	0	2
1	FW	(Zimbabwe)	77	Lucky Mkosana	0	2	0	2
4	FW	(Spain)	7	Raúl	1	0	0	1
4	MF	(Scotland)	16	Adam Moffat	1	0	0	1
4	MF	(Brazil)	22	Leo Fernandes	1	0	0	1
4	MF	(United States)	25	Hagop Chirishian	0	1	0	1
TOTALS					6	4	0	10

=== NASL Spring Season ===
The Spring season lasted for 10 games beginning on April 4 and ending on June 13. The schedule featured a single round robin format with each team playing every other team in the league a single time.

==== Standings ====
Pos	Team	Pld	W	D	L	GF	GA	GD	Pts	Qualification
1	New York Cosmos (S)	10	5	5	0	18	9	+9	20	Playoffs
2	Tampa Bay Rowdies	10	5	4	1	15	9	+6	19	
3	Carolina RailHawks	10	3	5	2	15	10	+5	14	
4	Minnesota United	10	3	5	2	15	13	+2	14	
5	Indy Eleven	10	3	4	3	13	12	+1	13	
6	Jacksonville Armada	10	3	3	4	15	18	−3	12	
7	San Antonio Scorpions	10	3	3	4	11	15	−4	12	
8	Fort Lauderdale Strikers	10	3	2	5	12	13	−1	11	
9	Ottawa Fury	10	2	5	3	5	8	−3	11	
10	FC Edmonton	10	2	3	5	16	22	−6	9	
11	Atlanta Silverbacks	10	1	5	4	7	13	−6	8	

Source: NASL
Rules for classification: 1) points; 2) total goal differential; 3) total goals scored; 4) head-to-head record; 5) away goal differential; 6) away goals scored
(S) Spring season champion

==== Results ====
Overall								Home						Away					
Pld	W	D	L	GF	GA	GD	Pts	W	D	L	GF	GA	GD	W	D	L	GF	GA	GD
10	5	5	0	18	9	+9	20	4	1	0	13	5	+8	1	4	0	5	4	+1

Last updated: June 13, 2015.
Source: http://www.nycosmos.com/standings

===== Results by round =====
Round	1	2	3	4	5	6	7	8	9	10
Stadium	A	A	H	A	H	H	A	H	A	H
Result	W	D	W	D	W	W	D	W	D	D
Position	4	3	1	1	1	1	1	1	1	1

Updated to match(es) played on June 13, 2015. Source: nycosmos.com
A = Away; H = Home; W = Win; D = Draw; L = Loss

==== Match reports ====
April 4, 2015 Match 1	Fort Lauderdale Strikers	0–1	New York Cosmos	Fort Lauderdale, Florida
19:30 EDT UTC−4	PC (yellow card) 42'; Pinho (yellow card) 45'	Report	Ayoze (yellow card) 52'; Fernandes 58'	Stadium: Lockhart Stadium; Attendance: 11,691; Referee: Alex Chilowicz

April 11, 2015 Match 2	Indy Eleven	1–1	New York Cosmos	Indianapolis, Indiana
20:00 EDT UTC−4	Brown 12'; Stojkov (yellow card) 48'; Melgares (yellow card) 56'	Report	Raúl 65'	Stadium: Carroll Stadium; Attendance: 10,524; Referee: Sorin Stoica

April 18, 2015 Match 3	New York Cosmos	2–0	Tampa Bay Rowdies	Hempstead, New York
19:00 EDT UTC−4	Senna 11' (pen.); Fernandes (yellow card) 17' (goal) 48'; Gorskie (yellow card) 28'; Stokkelien (yellow card) 76'	Report	Guerra (yellow card) 29'; Mkandawire (yellow card) 37'; Hristov (yellow card) 64'; Santos (yellow card) 70'; Antonijevic (yellow card) 74'	Stadium: Shuart Stadium; Attendance: 12,550; Referee: Robert Sibiga

April 25, 2015 Match 4	Atlanta Silverbacks	0–0	New York Cosmos	Atlanta, Georgia
19:30 EDT UTC−4	McKenzie (yellow card) 74'	Report	Mkosana (yellow card) 43'; Mendes (yellow card) 52'; Rovérsio (yellow card) 57'	Stadium: Atlanta Silverbacks Park; Attendance: 5,511; Referee: Marcos de Oliveira

May 2, 2015 Match 5	New York Cosmos	1–0	Ottawa Fury FC	Brooklyn, New York
19:00 EDT UTC−4	Mkosana 14'; Ayoze (yellow card) 87'; Raúl (yellow card) 87'	Report	Beckie (yellow card) 47'; Peiser (yellow card) 86'	Stadium: MCU Park; Attendance: 5,279; Referee: Jaime Herrera

May 10, 2015 Match 6	New York Cosmos	4–2	FC Edmonton	Hempstead, New York
15:00 EDT UTC−4	Mendes 2', 36'; Raúl 23'; Senna (yellow card) 32'; Mkosana 49'	Report	Ameobi 17' (pen.); Edward (yellow card) 65'; Jones 74'	Stadium: Shuart Stadium; Attendance: 3,383; Referee: Alejandro Mariscal

May 16, 2015 Match 7	Carolina RailHawks	2–2	New York Cosmos	Cary, North Carolina
19:30 EDT UTC−4	Hlavaty 7'; Low (yellow card) 45'; Gilstrap (yellow card) 74'; Shipalane 76'; Wagner (yellow card) 79'; Nurse (yellow card) 90'	Report	Szetela (yellow card) 30'; Raúl (yellow card) 32'; Ayoze (yellow card) 52'; Mkosana (yellow card) 67'; Danso 90+1' (o.g.); Flores 90+7'	Stadium: WakeMed Soccer Park; Attendance: 7,217; Referee: Nima Saghafi

May 23, 2015 Match 8	New York Cosmos	3–0	San Antonio Scorpions	Hempstead, New York
19:00 EDT UTC−4	Raúl 18' (pen.); Gorskie (yellow card) 24'; Restrepo (yellow card) 64'; Rovérsio 81'; Fernandes 86'	Report	Gibson (yellow card) 19'; Attakora (yellow card) 45'	Stadium: Shuart Stadium; Attendance: 5,032; Referee: Kevin Terry Jr.

May 30, 2015 Match 9	Minnesota United FC	1–1	New York Cosmos	Blaine, Minnesota
20:00 EDT UTC−4	Campos 8'; Vicentini (yellow card) 30'; Davis (yellow card) 44'; Ibson (yellow card) 79'	Report	Moffat (yellow card) 22'; Raúl 90'	Stadium: National Sports Center; Attendance: 9,317; Referee: Daniel Radford

June 13, 2015 Match 10	New York Cosmos	3–3	Jacksonville Armada FC	Hempstead, New York
19:00 EDT UTC−4	Gallardo 6' (o.g.); Chirishian 26'; Mkosana 86'	Report	Johnson (yellow card) 45'; Bahner (yellow card) 51'; Millien 59', 73'; Perea (yellow card) 62'; Toby 89'	Stadium: Shuart Stadium; Attendance: 7,353; Referee: Kevin Terry Jr.

=== NASL Fall Season ===
The Fall season lasted for 20 games beginning on July 12 and ending on November 1. The schedule featured a double round robin format with each team playing every other team in the league twice, one at home and one on the road.

==== Standings ====
Pos	Team	Pld	W	D	L	GF	GA	GD	Pts	Qualification
1	Ottawa Fury (F)	20	13	6	1	37	15	+22	45	Playoffs
2	Minnesota United	20	11	6	3	39	26	+13	39	
3	New York Cosmos	20	10	6	4	31	21	+10	36	
4	Fort Lauderdale Strikers	20	8	6	6	37	27	+10	30	
5	FC Edmonton	20	7	5	8	25	24	+1	26	
6	Atlanta Silverbacks	20	6	7	7	24	27	−3	25	
7	Carolina RailHawks	20	6	3	11	29	39	−10	21	
8	Tampa Bay Rowdies	20	5	5	10	18	28	−10	20	
9	Indy Eleven	20	5	5	10	23	36	−13	20	
10	San Antonio Scorpions	20	4	7	9	30	37	−7	19	
11	Jacksonville Armada	20	5	4	11	18	31	−13	19	

Source: NASL
Rules for classification: 1) points; 2) total goal differential; 3) total goals scored; 4) head-to-head record; 5) away goal differential; 6) away goals scored
(F) Fall season champion

==== Results ====
Overall								Home						Away					
Pld	W	D	L	GF	GA	GD	Pts	W	D	L	GF	GA	GD	W	D	L	GF	GA	GD
20	10	6	4	31	21	+10	36	7	2	1	18	10	+8	3	4	3	13	11	+2

Last updated: 5 November 2015.

===== Results by round =====
Round	1	2	3	4	5	6	7	8	9	10	11	12	13	14	15	16	17	18	19	20
Stadium	H	A	A	H	H	A	H	A	A	H	A	H	A	H	A	H	A	H	A	H
Result	D	L	D	W	W	D	W	W	D	W	L	W	D	L	L	D	W	W	W	W
Position	6	11	11	7	5	5	5	4	2	2	3	3	3	3	4	4	3	3	3	3

Updated to match(es) played on November 5, 2015. Source: Fall season 2015 results
A = Away; H = Home; W = Win; D = Draw; L = Loss

==== Match reports ====
July 5, 2015 Match 1	New York Cosmos	1—1	Indy Eleven	Hempstead, New York
17:00 EDT UTC−4	Guenzatti (yellow card) 67'; Szetela (yellow card) 72'; Restrepo 78'	Report	Wojcik 26'; Stojkov (yellow card) 77'; Ring (yellow card) 85'; Miller (yellow card) 90'	Stadium: Shuart Stadium; Attendance: 3,647; Referee: Mathieu Bourdeau

July 18, 2015 Match 2	Jacksonville Armada FC	1—0	New York Cosmos	Jacksonville, Florida
19:30 EDT UTC−4	Krizanovic 54'	Report	Stokkelien (yellow card) 90+3'	Stadium: Community First Park at the Baseball Grounds of Jacksonville; Attendance: 8,167; Referee: Matthew Kreitzer

July 25, 2015 Match 3	Indy Eleven	1—1	New York Cosmos	Indianapolis, Indiana
20:30 EDT UTC−4	Stojkov (yellow card) 34'; Mares 45+1'; Norales (red card) 65'	Report	Ayoze (yellow card) 36'; Restrepo 45'; Diosa (yellow card) 45+1'; Mendes (yellow card) 52'; Guenzatti (red card) 65'; Szetla (yellow card) 90'	Stadium: Carroll Stadium; Attendance: 10,206; Referee: Jaime Herrera

August 2, 2015 Match 4	New York Cosmos	2—0	Fort Lauderdale Strikers	Hempstead, New York
17:00 EDT UTC−4	Freeman 27' (yellow card) 39'; Fernandes 43'	Report	Kling (yellow card) 74'	Stadium: Shuart Stadium; Attendance: 4,503; Referee: Robert Sibiga

August 5, 2015 Match 5	New York Cosmos	2—1	Minnesota United FC	Hempstead, New York
18:30 EDT UTC−4	Restrepo 13'; Freeman 76'; Fernandes (yellow card) 78'; Szetela (yellow card) 88'; Maurer (yellow card) 90+4'	Report	Ramirez 8'; Campos (yellow card) 51'; Ibson (yellow card) 87'	Stadium: Shuart Stadium; Attendance: 3,607; Referee: Mark Kadlecik

August 8, 2015 Match 6	Fort Lauderdale Strikers	3—3	New York Cosmos	Jacksonville, Florida
19:30 EDT UTC−4	Gabriel 23' (pen.); Ramírez 48' (pen.), 59' (yellow card) 59'	Report	Fernandes 62'; Moffat 66'; Raúl (yellow card) 87'; Guenzatti 90+2'; Gorskie (yellow card) 90+5'	Stadium: Lockhart Stadium; Attendance: 5,667; Referee: Marcos de Oliveira

August 15, 2015 Match 7	New York Cosmos	2—1	San Antonio Scorpions	Hempstead, New York
19:00 EDT UTC−4	Fernandes 45+3'; Rusin 47' (o.g.); Maurer (yellow card) 90'	Report	Palacios 45+1'; Nane (red card) 84'	Stadium: Shuart Stadium; Attendance: 4,006; Referee: Dave Gantar

August 22, 2015 Match 8	Carolina Railhawks	1—3	New York Cosmos	Cary, North Carolina
19:30 EDT UTC−4	Scott 16' (yellow card) 28'	Report	Freeman (yellow card) 44'; Fernandes 46'; Mkosana 54'; Moffat 57'	Stadium: WakeMed Soccer Park; Attendance: 5,125; Referee: Nima Saghafi

August 26, 2015 Match 9	Ottawa Fury FC	0—0	New York Cosmos	Ottawa, Ontario
19:00 EDT UTC−4	Trafford (yellow card) 67'	Report	Moffat (yellow card) 55'; Freeman (yellow card) 90+1'	Stadium: TD Place; Attendance: 6,042; Referee: Chris Grabas

August 30, 2015 Match 10	New York Cosmos	3—2	Carolina Railhawks	Hempstead, New York
17:00 EDT UTC−4	Flores 2' (yellow card) 90'; Raúl 62' (pen.); Mkosana 85'	Report	Hlavaty (yellow card) 19'; Albadawi 23', 42' (yellow card) 83' da Luz (yellow card) 62'; Scott (red card) 66'; Tobin (yellow card) 90'	Stadium: Shuart Stadium; Attendance: 5,257; Referee: Kevin Terry Jr.

September 5, 2015 Match 11	Tampa Bay Rowdies	2—0	New York Cosmos	St. Petersburg, Florida
19:30 EDT UTC−4	Hertzog (yellow card) 13' (goal) 40'; Espinal 76'	Report	Cáceres (yellow card) 27'; Raúl (yellow card) 42'	Stadium: Al Lang Stadium; Attendance: 5,630; Referee: Alex Chilowicz

September 12, 2015 Match 12	New York Cosmos	1—0	Jacksonville Armada FC	Hempstead, New York
19:00 EDT UTC−4	Raúl 74'	Report	Scaglia (yellow card) 24' (yellow-red card) 90+4'; Trejo (red card) 52'; Perea (yellow card) 58'; Barrett (yellow card) 87'	Stadium: Shuart Stadium; Attendance: 5,089; Referee: Nima Saghafi

September 19, 2015 Match 13	Minnesota United FC	0—0	New York Cosmos	Blaine, Minnesota
20:00 EDT UTC−4	Ibson (yellow card) 45+1'; Davis (yellow card) 56'; Tiago (yellow card) 90+2'	Report	Bover (yellow card) 74'; Guenzatti (yellow card) 90+3'	Stadium: National Sports Center; Attendance: 9,418; Referee: Daniel Fitzgerald

September 22, 2015 Match 14	New York Cosmos	1—4	Ottawa Fury FC	Hempstead, New York
19:30 EDT UTC−4	Senna (yellow card) 30'; Cellerino (yellow card) 42'; Flores 47'; Mendes (yellow card) 83'	Report	Paulo Jr. 31', 56'; Mendes 77' (o.g.); Heinemann 78'	Stadium: Shuart Stadium; Attendance: 3,438; Referee: Tyler Ploeger

September 27, 2015 Match 15	FC Edmonton	2—1	New York Cosmos	Edmonton, Alberta
16:00 EDT UTC−4	Laing 41'; Fordyce 43'; Watson (yellow card) 57'; Cruz (yellow card) 62'; Raudales (yellow card) 79'	Report	Senna 58' (pen.)	Stadium: Clarke Stadium; Attendance: 4,240; Referee: Juan Marquez

October 4, 2015 Match 16	New York Cosmos	1—1	Atlanta Silverbacks	Hempstead, New York
17:00 EDT UTC−4	Ayoze (yellow card) 53'; Mensing 70' (o.g.); Senna (yellow card) 80'	Report	Mravec 38'	Stadium: Shuart Stadium; Attendance: 3,326

October 7, 2015 Match 17	Atlanta Silverbacks	0—3	New York Cosmos	Atlanta, Georgia
19:30 EDT UTC−4	Chavez (yellow card) 45'	Report	Guenzatti 29'; Cellerino 54'; Ayoze (yellow card) 55'; Freeman (yellow card) 67'; Fernandes 88'	Stadium: Atlanta Silverbacks Park; Attendance: 3,469; Referee: Alejandro Mariscal

October 11, 2015 Match 18	New York Cosmos	3—0	FC Edmonton	Hempstead, New York
17:00 EDT UTC−4	Guenzatti 37'; Raúl 45'; Szetela (yellow card) 84'; Bover 85'	Report	Smith (yellow card) 37'; Moses (yellow card) 59'	Stadium: Shuart Stadium; Attendance: 4,286; Referee: Robert Sibiga

October 24, 2015 Match 19	San Antonio Scorpions	1—2	New York Cosmos	San Antonio, Texas
20:30 EDT UTC−4	Tsiskaridze (yellow card) 41'; Forbes 43'; Attakora (yellow card) 89'	Report	Gorskie (yellow card) 32'; Senna 62' (pen.); Ayoze 78'; Restrepo (yellow card) 89'	Stadium: Toyota Field; Attendance: 8,053; Referee: Juan Guzman

October 31, 2015 Match 20	New York Cosmos	2—0	Tampa Bay Rowdies	Hempstead, New York
19:00 EDT UTC−4	Ayoze (yellow card) 31'; Raúl 54'; Guenzatti 58'	Report	Chavez (yellow card) 41'	Stadium: Shuart Stadium; Attendance: 5,171; Referee: Hilario Grajeda

=== The Championship ===
7 November 2015 Semi-Final	New York Cosmos	2—1	Fort Lauderdale Strikers	Brooklyn, New York
14:00 EST UTC−4	Cellerino 37' (yellow card) 74'; Senna (yellow card) 58'; Raúl 61'; Szetela (yellow card) 72'	Report	PC 16'; Thomas (yellow card) 33'	Stadium: MCU Park; Attendance: 5,061; Referee: Sorin Stoica

15 November 2015 Soccer Bowl	New York Cosmos	3—2	Ottawa Fury FC	Hempstead, New York
17:00 EST UTC−5	Cellerino (yellow card) 7' (goal) 8', 72', 85'; Maurer (yellow card) 41'; Guenzatti (yellow card) 60'	Report	Trafford (red card) 68'; Heinemann 70', 90+2'; Falvey (yellow card) 76'; Ryan (yellow card) 76'	Stadium: Shuart Stadium; Attendance: 10,166; Referee: Alan Kelly

=== U.S. Open Cup ===
The Cosmos competed in the 2015 edition of the Open Cup, entering in the Third Round of the tournament.

==== Match reports ====
May 27, 2015 3rd Round	New York Cosmos (New York (state))	3–0	(New Jersey) Jersey Express S.C.	Queens, New York
7:30EDT UTC−4	Fernandes 14'; Cáceres (yellow card) 20' (red card) 90+1'; Guenzatti 40'; Stokkelien 81' (pen.); Moffat (yellow card) 85'; Mulligan (yellow card) 87'	Report	Martinez (yellow card) 30'; Feitosa (yellow card) 65'; N'guessan (red card) 80'	Stadium: Belson Stadium; Attendance: 1,394

June 17, 2015 4th Round	New York Cosmos (New York (state))	2–2 (a.e.t.) (4–3 p)	(New York (state)) New York City FC	Hempstead, New York
7:30EDT UTC−4	Gorskie (yellow card) 40'; Fernandes 65'; Szetela (yellow card) 80'; Mkosana 90'; Chirishian (yellow card) 90+1'; Ayoze (yellow card) 117'; Freeman (yellow card) 118'	NASL Report; Cosmos Report; MLS Box Score	Poku 24', 57'; Ballouchy (yellow card) 59'; Wingert (yellow card) 86'; Grabavoy (yellow card) 115'	Stadium: James M. Shuart Stadium; Attendance: 11,446; Referee: Matt Kreitzer
	Penalties
	(penalty scored) Stokkelien; (penalty missed) Freeman; (penalty missed) Fernandes; (penalty scored) Mkosana; (penalty scored) Moffat; (penalty scored) Gorskie		(penalty scored) Wingert; (penalty missed) Grabavoy; (penalty scored) Ballouchy; (penalty scored) Diskerud; (penalty missed) Mullins; (penalty missed) Facey

July 1, 2015 5th Round	New York Red Bulls (New Jersey)	4–1	(New York (state)) New York Cosmos	Harrison, New Jersey
7:30p.m.EDT UTC−4	Zizzo 5'; Lade (yellow card) 11'; Abang 42'; Kljestan 54' (pen.); Grella 90'	Report; Boxscore	Mkosana 16'; Restrepo (yellow card) 19'; Gorskie (yellow card) 83'	Stadium: Red Bull Arena; Attendance: 11,442

== Squad statistics ==
As of Match played 15 November 2015

=== Appearances and goals ===
No.	Pos	Nat	Player	Total		NASL Spring Season		NASL Fall Season		NASL Playoffs		U.S. Open Cup	
No.	Pos	Nat	Player	Apps	Goals	Apps	Goals	Apps	Goals	Apps	Goals	Apps	Goals
1	GK	(United States) USA	Jimmy Maurer	33	0	10+0	0	18+0	0	2+0	0	3+0	0
2	DF	(United States) USA	Hunter Freeman	20	2	1+0	0	13+1	2	2+0	0	3+0	0
3	DF	(United States) USA	Hunter Gorskie	27	0	10+0	0	10+4	0	0+0	0	3+0	0
4	DF	(United States) USA	Carlos Mendes	32	2	10+0	2	18+0	0	2+0	0	2+0	0
5	DF	(Paraguay) PAR	Samuel Cáceres	16	0	1+0	0	12+1	0	0+0	0	2+0	0
6	MF	(Brazil) BRA	Rovérsio	15	1	8+0	1	4+1	0	2+0	0	0+0	0
7	FW	(Spain) ESP	Raúl	32	9	10+0	4	17+1	4	2+0	1	1+1	0
8	FW	(Argentina) ARG	Gastón Cellerino	10	5	0+0	0	5+3	1	2+0	4	0+0	0
11	FW	(El Salvador) SLV	Andrés Flores	22	3	0+5	1	11+4	2	0+0	0	2+0	0
12	GK	(United States) USA	Kyle Zobeck	1	0	0+0	0	1+0	0	0+0	0	0+0	0
13	MF	(Uruguay) URU	Sebastián Guenzatti	28	5	1+7	0	9+6	4	2+0	0	2+1	1
14	MF	(United States) USA	Danny Szetela	29	0	10+0	0	9+5	0	2+0	0	2+1	0
15	MF	(Spain) ESP	Ruben Bover	13	1	0+1	0	5+6	1	0+1	0	0+0	0
16	MF	(Scotland) SCO	Adam Moffat	21	2	3+5	0	9+2	2	0+0	0	2+0	0
17	FW	(Spain) ESP	Ayoze	29	1	8+0	0	18+0	1	2+0	0	1+0	0
18	FW	(United States) USA	Kharlton Belmar	1	0	0+0	0	0+1	0	0+0	0	0+0	0
19	MF	(Spain) ESP	Marcos Senna	22	3	7+0	1	9+2	2	2+0	0	2+0	0
20	MF	(United States) USA	Wálter Restrepo	33	3	9+1	0	15+4	3	2+0	0	2+0	0
21	FW	(Colombia) COL	David Diosa	5	0	0+2	0	3+0	0	0+0	0	0+0	0
22	MF	(Brazil) BRA	Leo Fernandes	31	10	9+0	3	13+5	5	0+1	0	2+1	2
23	FW	(United States) USA	Haji Wright	4	0	0+0	0	1+2	0	0+0	0	0+1	0
24	GK	(United States) USA	Brian Holt	1	0	0+0	0	1+0	0	0+0	0	0+0	0
25	MF	(United States) USA	Hagop Chirishian	6	1	1+0	1	1+2	0	0+0	0	0+2	0
28	MF	(United States) USA	Jimmy Mulligan	5	0	0+1	0	3+0	0	0+0	0	1+0	0
77	FW	(Zimbabwe) ZIM	Lucky Mkosana	32	7	7+2	3	14+4	2	0+2	0	2+1	2
Players who appeared for the New York Cosmos who are no longer at the club:
18	FW	(Norway) NOR	Mads Stokkelien	11	1	2+4	0	1+2	0	0+0	0	1+1	1

=== Goal scorers ===
Place	Position	Nation	Number	Name	NASL Spring Season	NASL Fall Season	NASL Playoffs	U.S. Open Cup	Total
1	MF	(Brazil)	22	Leo Fernandes	3	5	0	2	10
2	FW	(Spain)	7	Raúl	4	4	1	0	9
3	FW	(Zimbabwe)	77	Lucky Mkosana	3	2	0	2	7
4	FW	(Argentina)	8	Gastón Cellerino	0	1	4	0	5
4	MF	(Uruguay)	13	Sebastián Guenzatti	0	4	0	1	5
6	MF	(El Salvador)	11	Andrés Flores	1	2	0	0	3
6	MF	(Spain)	19	Marcos Senna	1	2	0	0	3
6	MF	(United States)	20	Wálter Restrepo	0	3	0	0	3
9	DF	(United States)	2	Hunter Freeman	0	2	0	0	2
9	DF	(United States)	4	Carlos Mendes	2	0	0	0	2
9	MF	(Scotland)	16	Adam Moffat	0	2	0	0	2
12	MF	(Brazil)	6	Rovérsio	1	0	0	0	1
12	MF	(Spain)	15	Ruben Bover	0	1	0	0	1
12	FW	(Spain)	17	Ayoze	0	1	0	0	1
12	FW	(Norway)	18	Mads Stokkelien	0	0	0	1	1
12	MF	(United States)	25	Hagop Chirishian	1	0	0	0	1
TOTALS					16	29	5	6	56

=== Own goal scorers ===
Position	Team	Number	Name	NASL Spring Season	NASL Fall Season	NASL Playoffs	U.S. Open Cup	Total
DF	Carolina RailHawks	98	Mamadou Danso	1	0	0	0	1
DF	San Antonio Scorpions	2	Brad Rusin	0	1	0	0	1
DF	Atlanta Silverbacks	4	Simon Mensing	0	1	0	0	1
GK	Jacksonville Armada FC	1	Miguel Gallardo	1	0	0	0	1

=== Disciplinary record ===
Number	Nation	Position	Name	NASL Spring Season		NASL Fall Season		NASL Playoffs		U.S. Open Cup		Total	
Number	Nation	Position	Name	Booked	Sent off (straight red)	Booked	Sent off (straight red)	Booked	Sent off (straight red)	Booked	Sent off (straight red)	Booked	Sent off (straight red)
1	(United States)	GK	Jimmy Maurer	0	0	2	0	1	0	0	0	3	0
2	(United States)	DF	Hunter Freeman	0	0	4	0	0	0	1	0	5	0
3	(United States)	DF	Hunter Gorskie	2	0	2	0	0	0	2	0	6	0
4	(United States)	DF	Carlos Mendes	1	0	2	0	0	0	0	0	3	0
5	(Paraguay)	DF	Samuel Cáceres	0	0	1	0	0	0	1	1	2	1
6	(Brazil)	DF	Rovérsio	1	0	0	0	0	0	0	0	1	0
7	(Spain)	FW	Raúl	2	0	2	0	0	0	0	0	4	0
8	(Argentina)	MF	Gastón Cellerino	0	0	1	0	2	0	0	0	3	0
11	(El Salvador)	MF	Andrés Flores	0	0	1	0	0	0	0	0	1	0
13	(Uruguay)	MF	Sebastián Guenzatti	0	0	2	1	1	0	0	0	3	1
14	(United States)	MF	Danny Szetela	1	0	4	0	1	0	1	0	7	0
15	(Spain)	MF	Ruben Bover	0	0	1	0	0	0	0	0	1	0
16	(Scotland)	MF	Adam Moffat	1	0	1	0	0	0	1	0	3	0
17	(Spain)	MF	Ayoze	3	0	4	0	0	0	1	0	8	0
18	(Norway)	FW	Mads Stokkelien	1	0	1	0	0	0	0	0	2	0
19	(Spain)	MF	Marcos Senna	1	0	2	0	1	0	0	0	4	0
20	(United States)	MF	Wálter Restrepo	1	0	1	0	0	0	1	0	3	0
21	(Colombia)	FW	David Diosa	0	0	1	0	0	0	0	0	1	0
22	(Brazil)	MF	Leo Fernandes	1	0	1	0	0	0	0	0	2	0
25	(United States)	MF	Hagop Chirishian	0	0	0	0	0	0	1	0	1	0
28	(United States)	MF	Jimmy Mulligan	0	0	0	0	0	0	1	0	1	0
77	(Zimbabwe)	FW	Lucky Mkosana	2	0	0	0	0	0	0	0	2	0
			TOTALS	17	0	33	1	6	0	10	1	66	2

== Transfers ==
=== In ===
No.	Pos.	Player	Transferred from	Fee/notes	Date	Source
7	FW	(Spain) Raúl	(Qatar) Al Sadd SC		30 October 2014	
77	FW	(Zimbabwe) Lucky Mkosana	(United States) Tampa Bay Rowdies		24 November 2014	
11	FW	(El Salvador) Andrés Flores	(El Salvador) A.D. Isidro Metapán		19 December 2014	
16	MF	(Scotland) Adam Moffat	(United States) FC Dallas		January 2015	
20	MF	(United States) Wálter Restrepo	(United States) San Antonio Scorpions		19 January 2015	
24	GK	(United States) Brian Holt	(United States) Philadelphia Union		9 March 2015	
23	FW	(United States) Haji Wright	(Germany) FC Schalke 04		30 March 2015	
30	GK	(United States) Keasel Broome	(United States) Providence College		1 April 2015	
15	MF	(Spain) Ruben Bover	(United States) New York Red Bulls		15 April 2015	
8	FW	(Argentina) Gastón Cellerino	(Chile) Santiago Wanderers		19 August 2015	

=== Out ===
No.	Pos.	Player	Transferred to	Fee/notes	Date	Source
16	MF	(United States) Dane Murphy	(United States)	Retired	16 November 2014	
27	FW	(United States) Jemal Johnson	(United States) Jacksonville Armada		16 November 2014	
33	DF	(United States) Jimmy Nealis	(United States) Long Island Rough Riders		16 November 2014	
	GK	(United States) Steven Diaz	(United States) Free Agent		16 November 2014	
5	MF	(Cameroon) Joseph Nane	(United States) San Antonio Scorpions		16 November 2014	
15	DF	(United States) Jimmy Ockford	(United States) Seattle Sounders FC	Loan Return	16 November 2014	
17	FW	(Bulgaria) Stefan Dimitrov	(Bulgaria) Free Agent		1 December 2014	
8	MF	(Venezuela) Diomar Díaz	(Venezuela) Caracas FC		29 December 2014	
22	FW	(United States) Danny Mwanga	(United States) Orlando City SC	Loan Return	12 January 2015	
20	FW	(Netherlands) Hans Denissen	(United States) Atlanta Silverbacks		17 February 2015	
18	FW	(Norway) Mads Stokkelien	(Norway) Start	Released	24 August 2015	

=== Loan in ===
No.	Pos.	Player	Loaned from	Fee/notes	Date	Source
22	MF	(Brazil) Leo Fernandes	(United States) Philadelphia Union	Yearlong	16 January 2015	
5	DF	(Paraguay) Samuel Cáceres	(Argentina) Nueva Chicago	Yearlong	13 February 2015	
18	FW	(United States) Kharlton Belmar	(United States) Portland Timbers 2	Rest of Season	1 October 2015	

=== Loan out ===
No.	Pos.	Player	Loaned to	Fee/notes	Date	Source
#	MF		New Team	Duration	Exit Date	
