= 2016 New York Cosmos season =

New York Cosmos
2016 season
- Chairman: Seamus O'Brien
- Head coach: Giovanni Savarese
- Stadium: Shuart Stadium; Belson Stadium
- NASL: Spring: Runners-Up Fall: Champions Combined: 1st Place
- Soccer Bowl: Champions
- U.S. Open Cup: 5th round
- Top goalscorer: League: Juan Arango (16); All: Juan Arango (16)
- Highest home attendance: 6,243 (May 22 vs. Tampa Bay)
- Lowest home attendance: League: 2,419 (May 1 vs. Carolina); All: 984 (Jun. 1 vs. Jersey at Belson Stadium)
- Average home league attendance: League: 4,302; All: 3,749
Home colors	Away colors

The 2016 New York Cosmos season was the new Cosmos' fourth season of existence, playing in the new North American Soccer League. Including the previous franchise, this is the eighteenth season of a club entitled New York Cosmos playing professional soccer in the New York metropolitan area.

== Club ==
=== Roster ===
As of March 18, 2016.

Note: Flags indicate national team as defined under FIFA eligibility rules; some limited exceptions apply. Players may hold more than one non-FIFA nationality. Squad correct as of March 18, 2016.

No.	Pos.	Nation	Player
1	GK	USA	Jimmy Maurer
2	DF	USA	Hunter Freeman
3	DF	KEN	David Ochieng
4	DF	USA	Carlos Mendes (Captain)
6	DF	BRA	Rovérsio
7	FW	BOL	Yasmani Duk (on loan from Sport Boys Warnes)
11	MF	SLV	Andrés Flores
12	GK	USA	Kyle Zobeck
13	MF	URU	Sebastián Guenzatti
14	MF	USA	Danny Szetela
15	MF	ESP	Ruben Bover Izquierdo
16	MF	SCO	Adam Moffat
17	DF	ESP	Ayoze García
18	MF	VEN	Juan Arango
19	MF	VEN	Yohandry Orozco
21	FW	COL	David Diosa
23	DF	USA	Jimmy Ockford (on loan from Seattle Sounders FC)
24	GK	USA	Brian Holt
25	FW	CRC	Jairo Arrieta
26	MF	USA	Eric Calvillo
29	DF	USA	Alexis Velela
77	FW	ZIM	Lucky Mkosana

== Competitions ==
=== Pre-season and exhibitions ===
==== Pre-season ====
12 February 2016 Friendly	LIU Brooklyn Blackbirds	0–2	New York Cosmos	Brooklyn, New York
11:00 A.M. EST UTC−5		Report	Arrieta; Kranjčar	Stadium: LIU Field

20 February 2016 Friendly	FC Ararat Yerevan (Armenia)	0–2	(United States) New York Cosmos	Glendora, California
10:00 P.M. EST UTC−5	(yellow card) 54'	Report	Ayoze (yellow card) 28'; Mkosana 36'; Guenzatti 69'	Stadium: Citrus Stadium

24 February 2016 Friendly	Fresno Fuego	1–2	New York Cosmos	Fresno, California
9:30 P.M. EST UTC−5	Da Rosa 69'	Report	Orozco 28'; Arrieta 32'	Stadium: Chukchansi Park

27 February 2016 Friendly	San Jose Earthquakes	1–0	New York Cosmos	San Jose, California
10:00 P.M. EST UTC−5	Wondolowski (yellow card) 31'; Amarikwa (yellow card) 42'; Goodson 51'; Godoy (yellow card) 67'	Report	Ayoze (yellow card) 54'	Stadium: Avaya Stadium

9 March 2016 Friendly	Miami United FC	0–3	New York Cosmos	Fort Lauderdale, Florida
7:00 P.M. EST UTC−5		Report	Duk, Bover 44'	Stadium: Lockhart Stadium

12 March 2016 Friendly	Boca Raton FC	0–3	New York Cosmos	Boca Raton, Florida
7:00 P.M. EST UTC−5		Report	Flores 10'; Freeman; Duk 88'	Stadium: Boca Raton HS Stadium

19 March 2016 Friendly	Charleston Battery	3–0	New York Cosmos	Charleston, South Carolina
7:30 P.M. EST UTC−5	Garbanzo 32', 73'; Woodbine (yellow card) 69'; Marini 80'	Report	Ayoze (yellow card) 64'	Stadium: MUSC Health Stadium; Attendance: 3,363

23 March 2016 Scrimmage	New York Cosmos	6–0	Hofstra Pride	Hempstead, New York
EST UTC−5	Guenzatti 22'; Bover 35', 79'; Orozco 58'; Arrieta 60', 63'	Report		Stadium: Shuart Stadium

==== Exhibitions ====
25 May 2016 Friendly	New York Cosmos (United States)	2–2 (5–4 p)	(Spain) SD Eibar	Las Vegas, Nevada
EST UTC−5	Duk 12', 53'	Report	Escalante 3', (yellow card) 29'; Luna 9'	Stadium: Sam Boyd Stadium
	Penalties
	Orozco (penalty missed); Arrieta (penalty scored); Bover (penalty scored); Flores (penalty scored); Mkosana (penalty scored); Diosa (penalty scored)		(penalty scored) Lillo; (penalty missed) Jota (penalty scored); (penalty scored) Borja (penalty scored); (penalty missed) Keko

3 August 2016 Friendly	New York Cosmos (United States)	0–2	(United States) USMNT U20	East Garden City, New York
2pm EDT UTC−5		Report	Gutjahr 46'; Suarez 67'	Stadium: Mitchel Athletic Complex; Attendance: Closed Doors

=== Friendlies goal scorers ===
Place	Position	Nation	Number	Name	Pre-Season	Exhibition	Post-Season	Total
1	FW	(Bolivia)	7	Yasmani Duk	3	2	0	5
2	FW	(Costa Rica)	25	Jairo Arrieta	4	0	0	4
3	MF	(Spain)	15	Ruben Bover Izquierdo	3	0	0	3
4	MF	(Uruguay)	13	Sebastián Guenzatti	2	0	0	2
4	MF	(Venezuela)	19	Yohandry Orozco	2	0	0	2
5	DF	(Spain)	17	Ayoze	1	0	0	1
5	MF	(El Salvador)	11	Andrés Flores	1	0	0	1
5	DF	(United States)	2	Hunter Freeman	1	0	0	1
5	MF	(Croatia)	5	Niko Kranjčar	1	0	0	1
TOTALS					18	0	0	20

=== NASL spring season ===
The spring season will last for 10 games beginning on April 2 and ending on June 12. The schedule will feature a single round robin format with each team playing every other team in the league a single time.

==== Standings ====
Pos	Team	Pld	W	D	L	GF	GA	GD	Pts	Qualification
1	Indy Eleven (S)	10	4	6	0	15	8	+7	18	Playoffs
2	New York Cosmos	10	6	0	4	15	8	+7	18	
3	FC Edmonton	10	5	2	3	9	7	+2	17	
4	Minnesota United	10	5	1	4	16	12	+4	16	
5	Tampa Bay Rowdies	10	4	4	2	11	9	+2	16	
6	Fort Lauderdale Strikers	10	4	3	3	12	12	0	15	
7	Carolina RailHawks	10	4	2	4	11	13	−2	14	
8	Rayo OKC	10	3	3	4	11	12	−1	12	
9	Ottawa Fury	10	2	3	5	9	14	−5	9	
10	Jacksonville Armada	10	1	4	5	5	11	−6	7	
11	Miami FC	10	1	4	5	7	15	−8	7	

Source: NASL
Rules for classification: 1) points; 2) total goal differential; 3) total goals scored; 4) head-to-head record; 5) away goal differential; 6) away goals scored
(S) Spring season champion

==== Results ====
Overall								Home						Away					
Pld	W	D	L	GF	GA	GD	Pts	W	D	L	GF	GA	GD	W	D	L	GF	GA	GD
10	6	0	4	15	8	+7	18	5	0	0	9	1	+8	1	0	4	6	7	−1

Last updated: June 4, 2016.
Source: http://www.nycosmos.com/standings

===== Results by round =====
Round	1	2	3	4	5	6	7	8	9	10
Stadium	H	H	A	A	H	A	A	H	H	A
Result	W	W	L	L	W	W	L	W	W	L
Position	1	1	2	3	3	1	3	1	1	1

Updated to match(es) played on June 4, 2016. Source: nycosmos.com
A = Away; H = Home; W = Win; D = Draw; L = Loss

==== Match reports ====
April 3, 2016 Match 1	New York Cosmos	3—0	Ottawa Fury FC	Hempstead, New York
18:00 EDT UTC−4	Arango 36', 38'; Bover (yellow card) 56'; Guenzatti (yellow card) 60'; Arrieta (yellow card) 70'; Moffat 71'	Report		Stadium: Shuart Stadium; Attendance: 5,094; Referee: Mark Kadlecik

April 10, 2016 Match 2	New York Cosmos	2—0	Jacksonville Armada FC	Hempstead, New York
18:00 EDT UTC−4	Arrieta 29' (yellow card) 90+3'; Moffat 55'	Report	Keita (yellow card) 45+1'	Stadium: Shuart Stadium; Attendance: 3,685; Referee: Robert Sibiga

April 16, 2016 Match 3	Indy Eleven	2—1	New York Cosmos	Indianapolis, Indiana
19:30 EDT UTC−4	Vuković (yellow card) 50'; Braun (yellow card) 57'; Janicki (yellow card) 65'; Zayed 90', 90+5' (pen.); Ring (yellow card) 90+5'	Report	Kranjčar 51' (pen.); Freeman (yellow card) 89'	Stadium: Carroll Stadium; Attendance: 9,067; Referee: Geoff Gamble

April 23, 2016 Match 4	Minnesota United FC	1—0	New York Cosmos	Blaine, Minnesota
TBA EDT UTC−4	Lowe (yellow card) 25' (red card) 53'; Añor (yellow card) 66'; Davis (yellow card) 81'; Ramirez 90' (yellow card) 90'; Calvano (yellow card) 90+7'	Report	Kranjčar (yellow card) 28'; Freeman (yellow card) 90+5'	Stadium: National Sports Center; Attendance: 9,078; Referee: Chris Penso

May 1, 2016 Match 5	New York Cosmos	1—0	Carolina RailHawks	Hempstead, New York
18:00 EDT UTC−4	Orozco 45' (yellow card) 74'; Kranjčar (yellow card) 72'; Ayoze (yellow card) 84'	Report	Marcelin (yellow card) 67'; Albadawi (yellow card) 72'; Mensing (yellow card) 90+6'	Stadium: Shuart Stadium; Attendance: 2,419; Referee: Alex Chilowicz

May 7, 2016 Match 6	Miami FC	0—3	New York Cosmos	Miami, Florida
20:00 EDT UTC−4	Borrajo (yellow card) 19'; Cvitanich (yellow card) 67'; Ca. Rezende (yellow card) 76'	Report	Arango 18'; Farfan 34' (yellow card) 67'; Ayoze (yellow card) 45+1'; Arrieta 50' (yellow card) 62'	Stadium: FIU; Attendance: 3,432; Referee: Younes Marrakchi

May 15, 2016 Match 7	FC Edmonton	2—1	New York Cosmos	Edmonton, Alberta
16:00 EDT UTC−4	Plumhoff 13'; Ameobi (yellow card) 41'; Cruz (yellow card) 66'; Diakité 74'; Corea (yellow card) 81'; Van Oekel (yellow card) 90+4'	Report	Orozco 22' (yellow card) 90'; Arango (yellow card) 60'; Ayoze (yellow card) 74'	Stadium: Clarke Field; Attendance: 2,688; Referee: Yusri Rudolf

May 22, 2016 Match 8	New York Cosmos	2—1	Tampa Bay Rowdies	Hempstead, New York
18:00 EDT UTC−4	Duk 32'; Mendes (yellow card) 36'; Bover 40', (yellow card) 57'	NYC Report; NASL Report	Heinemann 18'; Burgos (yellow card) 84'	Stadium: Shuart Stadium; Attendance: 6,243; Referee: Mike Lavergne

May 28, 2016 Match 9	New York Cosmos	1—0	Rayo OKC	Hempstead, New York
19:00 EDT UTC−4	Szetela (yellow card) 41' (goal) 54'; Guenzatti (yellow card) 45+1'; Ockford (yellow card) 86'	Report	Samaras (yellow card) 20' (yellow-red card) 90+1'; Michel (red card) 36'; Boateng (yellow card) 45+1'; Forbes (red card) 89'	Stadium: Shuart Stadium; Attendance: 4,068; Referee: Jose Carlos Rivero

June 4, 2016 Match 10	Fort Lauderdale Strikers	2—1	New York Cosmos	Fort Lauderdale, Florida
19:00 EDT UTC−4	Fernandes (yellow card) 09'; PC (yellow card) 16'; Restrepo (yellow card) 20'; Angulo 35'; Moura 74'; Gonzalez (yellow card) 80'	Report	Arango (yellow card) 41' (goal) 90+2'; Ockford (yellow card) 52'	Stadium: Lockhart Stadium; Attendance: 1,297; Referee: Nima Saghafi

=== NASL fall season ===
The fall season lasted for 22 games beginning on July 2 and ending on November 1. The schedule featured a double round robin format with each team playing every other team in the league twice, one at home and one on the road.

==== Standings ====
Pos	Team	Pld	W	D	L	GF	GA	GD	Pts	Qualification
1	New York Cosmos (F)	22	14	5	3	44	21	+23	47	Playoffs
2	Indy Eleven	22	11	4	7	36	25	+11	37	
3	FC Edmonton	22	10	6	6	16	14	+2	36	
4	Rayo OKC	22	9	8	5	28	21	+7	35	
5	Miami FC	22	9	6	7	31	27	+4	33	
6	Fort Lauderdale Strikers	22	7	5	10	19	28	−9	26	
7	Carolina RailHawks	22	7	5	10	25	35	−10	26	
8	Minnesota United	22	6	7	9	25	25	0	25	
9	Puerto Rico	22	5	9	8	19	31	−12	24	
10	Tampa Bay Rowdies	22	5	8	9	29	32	−3	23	
11	Jacksonville Armada	22	5	8	9	25	35	−10	23	
12	Ottawa Fury	22	5	7	10	23	26	−3	22	

Source: NASL
Rules for classification: 1) points; 2) total goal differential; 3) total goals scored; 4) head-to-head record; 5) away goal differential; 6) away goals scored
(F) Fall season champion

==== Results ====
Overall								Home						Away					
Pld	W	D	L	GF	GA	GD	Pts	W	D	L	GF	GA	GD	W	D	L	GF	GA	GD
22	14	5	3	44	21	+23	47	9	2	0	28	5	+23	5	3	3	16	16	0

Last updated: 30 October 2016.

===== Results by round =====
Round	1	2	3	4	5	6	7	8	9	10	11	12	13	14	15	16	17	18	19	20	21	22
Stadium	H	A	H	A	A	A	H	H	H	A	H	H	A	H	H	A	A	H	A	A	H	A
Result	W	W	W	L	D	L	W	D	W	W	W	W	D	W	D	L	W	W	D	W	W	W
Position	2	1	1	1	2	4	1	3	3	2	1	1	1	1	1	1	1	1	1	1	1	1

Updated to match(es) played on October 23, 2016. Source: Fall season 2016 results
A = Away; H = Home; W = Win; D = Draw; L = Loss

==== Match reports ====
July 2, 2016 Match 1	New York Cosmos	2—1	Ottawa Fury FC	Hempstead, New York
17:00 EDT UTC−4	Moffat 9' (pen.); Mkosana 45+1'; Ochieng (yellow card) 78'; Guenzatti (yellow card) 90+3'	Report	Peiser (red card) 4'; Bailey (yellow card) 33' de Guzman (yellow card) 36'; Haworth (yellow card) 65'; Paulo Jr. 90+1'	Stadium: Shuart Stadium; Attendance: 3,518; Referee: Geoff Gamble

July 9, 2016 Match 2	Miami FC	2—3	New York Cosmos	Miami, Florida
20:00 EDT UTC−4	Poku (yellow card) 52' (goal) 73'; Cvitanich 87' (pen.)	Report	Holt (yellow card) 17'; Mkosana 39', 90+2'; Diosa (yellow card) 70'; Bover (yellow card) 77'; Orozco 81'; Flores (yellow card) 90+3'	Stadium: FIU Stadium; Attendance: 4,519; Referee: Marcos de Oliveira

July 13, 2016 Match 3	New York Cosmos	3—0	Jacksonville Armada FC	Hempstead, New York
19:30 EDT UTC−4	Flores 27'; Maurer (yellow card) 33'; Diosa 36'; Moffat 79'; Szetela (yellow card) 81'	Report	Johnson (yellow card) 32'	Stadium: Shuart Stadium; Attendance: 3,827; Referee: Mathieu Bourdeau

July 16, 2016 Match 4	Rayo OKC	3—0	New York Cosmos	Yukon, Oklahoma
19:00 EDT UTC−4	Kimura (yellow card) 28'; Michel 49' (pen.), 65' van Schaik (yellow card) 84'; Pecka (yellow card) 85'; Boateng (yellow card) 87'; Samaras 90+54'	Report		Stadium: Miller Stadium; Attendance: 4,621; Referee: Tyler Ploeger

July 23, 2016 Match 5	Tampa Bay Rowdies	2—2	New York Cosmos	St. Petersburg, Florida
19:00 EDT UTC−4	Vingaard (yellow card) 30'; Nanchoff (yellow card) 45'; Hristov (yellow card) 54'; King (yellow card) 59'; Ayoze 85' (o.g.); Cole 90+6' (pen.)	Report	Arango 53' (yellow card) 90+3'; Duk (yellow card) 62' (goal) 67'; Diosa (yellow card) 83'; Ockford (yellow card) 90+5'	Stadium: Al Lang Stadium; Attendance: 6,301; Referee: Caleb Mendez

July 27, 2016 Match 6	FC Edmonton	2—1	New York Cosmos	Edmonton, Alberta
21:00 EDT UTC−4	Ledgerwood 79'; Fordyce 90+1'	Report	Arango 6'; Ayoze (yellow card) 22'; Freeman (yellow card) 45'; Diosa (yellow card) 77'	Stadium: Clarke Stadium; Attendance: 2,104; Referee: Alain Ruich

July 30, 2016 Match 7	New York Cosmos	3—0	Puerto Rico FC	Hempstead, New York
19:30 EDT UTC−4	Cristiano 16' (o.g.); Arango 84'; Mkosana 90+2'	Report	J. Rivera (yellow card) 23'; Kafari (yellow card) 78'	Stadium: Shuart Stadium; Attendance: 3,391; Referee: Edvin Jurisevic

August 7, 2016 Match 8	New York Cosmos	1—1	Rayo OKC	Hempstead, New York
16:00 EDT UTC−4	Moffat 39' (pen.); Ayoze (yellow card) 55'; Maurer (yellow card) 57'	Report	Samaras 4'; Boateng (yellow card) 57'; Danso (yellow card) 90+1'; Hernandez (yellow card) 90+3'; Michel (yellow card) 90+4'	Stadium: Shuart Stadium; Attendance: 2,871; Referee: Sorin Stoica

August 13, 2016 Match 9	New York Cosmos	3—2	Tampa Bay Rowdies	Hempstead, New York
19:00 EDT UTC−4	Ayoze (yellow card) 22'; Mulligan (yellow card) 28'; Moffat 39' (pen.), 64' (pen.) (red card) 67'; Duk (yellow card) 67'; Diosa 90+3'; Flores (yellow card) 90+6'	Report	Cole 11' (yellow card) 63'; PC 14' (yellow card) 59'; Guerra (yellow card) 20'; Mkandawire (yellow card) 36'; King (red card) 67'; Collins (yellow card) 67'	Stadium: Shuart Stadium; Attendance: 3,489; Referee: Nima Saghafi

August 20, 2016 Match 10	Puerto Rico FC	1—2	New York Cosmos	Bayamón, Puerto Rico
19:30 EDT UTC−4	Nurse (yellow card) 23'; Ramos 28' (yellow card) 60'; Paulo (yellow card) 87'	Report	Arrieta 62'; Flores 90+1'; Guenzatti (yellow card) 90+2'	Stadium: Juan Ramón Loubriel Stadium; Attendance: 4,208; Referee: Kimbell Ward

August 27, 2016 Match 11	New York Cosmos	6—1	Carolina Railhawks	Hempstead, New York
19:00 EDT UTC−4	Arango 8', 57'; Ayoze (yellow card) 13'; Arrieta 61', 82'; Guenzatti (yellow card) 67' (goal) 90+3'; Flores 79'; Diosa (yellow card) 85'	Report	Fondy 6'; Tobin (yellow card) 17'; Shipalane (yellow card) 67'; Beckie (yellow card) 84'	Stadium: Shuart Stadium; Attendance: 3,221; Referee: Jose Carlos Rivero

August 31, 2016 Match 12	New York Cosmos	3—0	Indy Eleven	Hempstead, New York
19:30 EDT UTC−4	Bover 8' (yellow card) 27'; Arango 17' (pen.), 73'; Diosa (yellow card) 67'	Report	Miller (red card) 53'; Youla (yellow card) 55'; Palmer (yellow card) 67'	Stadium: Shuart Stadium; Attendance: 2,977; Referee: Jaime Herrera

September 3, 2016 Match 13	Fort Lauderdale Strikers	0—0	New York Cosmos	Lauderhill, Florida
19:00 EDT UTC−4	Attakora (yellow card) 67'; Amauri (yellow card) 87'; Dalton (yellow card) 90+2'	Report	Mendes (yellow card) 51'; Guenzatti (yellow card) 67'	Stadium: Central Broward Regional Park; Attendance: 1,821; Referee: Rubiel Vazquez

September 10, 2016 Match 14	New York Cosmos	1—0	Minnesota United FC	Hempstead, New York
19:00 EDT UTC−4	Rovérsio (yellow card) 30'; Diosa 32'; Mkosana (yellow card) 80'; Flores (yellow card) 90+3'	Report	Lowe (yellow card) 39'	Stadium: Shuart Stadium; Attendance: 3,318; Referee: Alejandro Mariscal

September 17, 2016 Match 15	New York Cosmos	0—0	FC Edmonton	Hempstead, New York
19:00 EDT UTC−4		Report	Nyassi (yellow card) 25'; Watson (yellow card) 54'	Stadium: Shuart Stadium; Attendance: 3,723; Referee: Mark Kadlecik

September 24, 2016 Match 16	Indy Eleven	3—0	New York Cosmos	Indianapolis, Indiana
19:30 EDT UTC−4	Braun 32'; Zayed 48'; Mares 51'	Report		Stadium: Michael Carroll Stadium; Attendance: 9,157; Referee: David Gantar

September 28, 2016 Match 17	Carolina Railhawks	0—2	New York Cosmos	Cary, North Carolina
19:30 EDT UTC−4	Beckie (yellow card) 64'	Report	Duk (yellow card) 42'; Mendes (yellow card) 55'; Bover (yellow card) 59' (goal) 72'; Moffat 71' (pen.)	Stadium: WakeMed Soccer Park; Attendance: 3,093; Referee: Alex Chilowicz

October 2, 2016 Match 18	New York Cosmos	2—0	Fort Lauderdale Strikers	Hempstead, New York
14:00 EDT UTC−4	Bover 57'; Moffat (yellow card) 73'; Flores 86'; Ayoze (yellow card) 90+3'	Report	Amauri (yellow card) 79'	Stadium: Shuart Stadium; Attendance: 2,707; Referee: Mathieu Bourdeau

October 9, 2016 Match 19	Ottawa Fury FC	1—1	New York Cosmos	Ottawa, Ontario
14:00 EDT UTC−4	Williams 54'; Haworth (yellow card) 57'; Eustáquio (yellow card) 77'	Report	Moffat (yellow card) 56'; Arango 79'; Arrieta (yellow card) 83'	Stadium: TD Place Stadium; Attendance: 4,400; Referee: Silviu Petrescu

October 15, 2016 Match 20	Jacksonville Armada FC	2—4	New York Cosmos	Jacksonville, Florida
19:00 EDT UTC−4	Bahner (yellow card) 37'; Steinberger (yellow card) 62' (goal) 79'; Keita 66' (yellow card) 70' (yellow-red card) 84'; Gebhard (yellow card) 81'; Gallardo (yellow card) 84'; Eloundou (yellow card) 87'	Report	Orozco 23'; Ochieng (yellow card) 54'; Arango 83', 88'; Arrieta 90+5'	Stadium: Community First Park; Attendance: 3,044; Referee: Luis Guardia

October 22, 2016 Match 21	New York Cosmos	4—0	Miami FC	Hempstead, New York
19:00 EDT UTC−4	Arrieta 2'; Orozco 7', 36'; Arango 30'	Report	Freeman (yellow card) 31'	Stadium: Shuart Stadium; Attendance: 5,852; Referee: Jorge Gonzalez

October 29, 2016 Match 22	Minnesota United FC	0—1	New York Cosmos	Blaine, Minnesota
20:00 EDT UTC−4	Cruz (yellow card) 38'; Lowe (yellow card) 61'; Davis (yellow card) 71'	Report	Mulligan (yellow card) 45'; Calvillo 49'; Orozco (yellow card) 62'; Diosa (yellow card) 90+3'	Stadium: National Sports Center; Attendance: 8,609; Referee: Allen Chapman

=== The Championship ===
5 November 2016 Semi-Final	New York Cosmos	2—1	Rayo OKC	Hempstead, New York
7:00 PM EST UTC−4	Arango 73' (yellow card) 77'; Orozco 90'; Duk (yellow card) 90+2'	Report	Danso 37'; Velásquez (yellow card) 42'; Kimura (yellow card) 64'	Stadium: Shuart Stadium; Attendance: 5,023; Referee: Jose Carlos Rivero

13 November 2016 Soccer Bowl	New York Cosmos	0—0 (a.e.t.) (4—2 p)	Indy Eleven	Queens, New York
7:00 PM EST UTC−4	Arrieta (yellow card) 116'	Report	Ring (yellow card) 72'; Falvey (yellow card) 83'	Stadium: Belson Stadium; Attendance: 2,150; Referee: Allen Chapman
	Penalties
	(penalty scored) Arrieta; (penalty scored) Moffat; (penalty scored) Ayoze; (penalty scored) Richter		(penalty scored) Paterson; (penalty missed) Zayed; (penalty missed) Busch; (penalty scored) Vuković

=== U.S. Open Cup ===
The Cosmos competed in the 2016 edition of the Open Cup, entering in the Third Round of the tournament.

==== Match reports ====
June 1, 2016 3rd Round	New York Cosmos (New York (state))	2—0	(New Jersey) Jersey Express S.C.	Queens, New York
7:30EDT UTC−4	Bover (yellow card) 24'; Ayoze 35' (yellow card) 68'; Orozco 72'	Report	Goulart (yellow card) 5'	Stadium: Belson Stadium; Attendance: 984; Referee: Dave Breckner

June 15, 2016 4th round	New York City FC (New York (state))	0—1	New York Cosmos	Bronx, New York
7:30EDT UTC−4	Mena (yellow card) 44'; White (yellow card) 52'	NASL Report; MLS Report	Arango (yellow card) 43'; Szetela (yellow card) 53' (goal) 88'	Stadium: Coffey Field; Attendance: 4,500; Referee: Jorge Gonzalez

June 29, 2016 Round of 16	New York Cosmos (New York (state))	2—3	(Massachusetts) New England Revolution	Queens, New York
7:30EDT UTC−4	Bover 38'; Ayoze (yellow card) 41'; Guenzatti 56'	NYC Report; NASL Report	Fagúndez (yellow card) 22'; Bunbury 43', 83'; Kamara 75'	Stadium: Belson Stadium; Attendance: 1,264; Referee: Sorin Stoica

== Squad statistics ==
As of Match played 13 November 2016

=== Appearances and goals ===
No.	Pos	Nat	Player	Total		NASL spring season		NASL fall season		NASL Playoffs		U.S. Open Cup	
No.	Pos	Nat	Player	Apps	Goals	Apps	Goals	Apps	Goals	Apps	Goals	Apps	Goals
1	GK	(United States) USA	Jimmy Maurer	31	0	9+0	0	18+0	0	2+0	0	2+0	0
2	DF	(United States) USA	Ryan Richter	8	0	0+0	0	5+1	0	2+0	0	0+0	0
3	DF	(Kenya) KEN	David Ochieng	15	0	0+1	0	11+1	0	0+1	0	1+0	0
4	DF	(United States) USA	Carlos Mendes	32	0	10+0	0	17+0	0	2+0	0	3+0	0
6	DF	(Brazil) BRA	Rovérsio	12	0	0+0	0	6+2	0	2+0	0	2+0	0
7	FW	(Bolivia) BOL	Yasmani Duk	12	2	1+1	1	7+2	1	0+1	0	0+0	0
8	FW	(Italy) ITA	Andrea Mancini	1	0	0+0	0	0+1	0	0+0	0	0+0	0
11	FW	(El Salvador) SLV	Andrés Flores	27	4	4+5	0	10+5	4	2+0	0	1+0	0
12	GK	(United States) USA	Kyle Zobeck	1	0	1+0	0	0+0	0	0+0	0	0+0	0
13	MF	(Uruguay) URU	Sebastián Guenzatti	29	2	9+1	0	13+3	1	0+0	0	3+0	1
14	MF	(United States) USA	Danny Szetela	28	2	3+2	1	10+9	0	0+1	0	3+0	1
15	MF	(Spain) ESP	Ruben Bover	29	5	3+2	1	17+2	3	2+0	0	3+0	1
16	MF	(Scotland) SCO	Adam Moffat	26	8	1+2	2	14+5	6	2+0	0	0+2	0
17	DF	(Spain) ESP	Ayoze	35	1	10+0	0	19+1	0	2+0	0	3+0	1
18	MF	(Venezuela) VEN	Juan Arango	33	16	10+0	4	19+0	11	2+0	1	2+0	0
19	MF	(Venezuela) VEN	Yohandry Orozco	25	8	6+1	2	10+3	4	2+0	1	2+1	1
21	FW	(Colombia) COL	David Diosa	25	3	0+3	0	11+9	3	0+1	0	1+0	0
23	DF	(United States) USA	Jimmy Ockford	21	0	8+2	0	4+4	0	0+1	0	0+2	0
24	GK	(United States) USA	Brian Holt	5	0	0+0	0	4+0	0	0+0	0	1+0	0
25	FW	(Costa Rica) CRC	Jairo Arrieta	31	7	9+0	2	11+6	5	2+0	0	2+1	0
26	MF	(United States) USA	Eric Calvillo	3	1	0+0	0	1+2	1	0+0	0	0+0	0
28	MF	(United States) USA	Jimmy Mulligan	14	0	0+0	0	12+2	0	0+0	0	0+0	0
29	MF	(United States) USA	Alexis Velela	1	0	0+0	0	0+1	0	0+0	0	0+0	0
77	FW	(Zimbabwe) ZIM	Lucky Mkosana	28	4	0+7	0	12+6	4	0+0	0	1+2	0
Players who appeared for the New York Cosmos who are no longer at the club:
2	DF	(United States) USA	Hunter Freeman	23	0	9+0	0	11+0	0	0+0	0	3+0	0
5	MF	(Croatia) CRO	Niko Kranjčar	7	1	6+1	1	0+0	0	0+0	0	0+0	0
8	MF	(Sierra Leone) SLE	Michael Lahoud	7	0	7+0	0	0+0	0	0+0	0	0+0	0
27	MF	(United States) USA	Gabriel Farfan	4	1	3+1	1	0+0	0	0+0	0	0+0	0

=== Goal scorers ===
Place	Position	Nation	Number	Name	NASL spring season	NASL fall season	NASL Playoffs	U.S. Open Cup	Total
1	MF	(Venezuela)	18	Juan Arango	4	11	1	0	16
2	MF	(Scotland)	16	Adam Moffat	2	6	0	0	8
2	MF	(Venezuela)	19	Yohandry Orozco	2	4	1	1	8
4	FW	(Costa Rica)	25	Jairo Arrieta	2	5	0	0	7
5	MF	(Spain)	15	Ruben Bover	1	3	0	1	5
6	MF	(El Salvador)	11	Andrés Flores	0	4	0	0	4
6	FW	(Zimbabwe)	77	Lucky Mkosana	0	4	0	0	4
8	FW	(Colombia)	21	David Diosa	0	3	0	0	3
9	FW	(Bolivia)	7	Yasmani Duk	1	1	0	0	2
9	MF	(Uruguay)	13	Sebastián Guenzatti	0	1	0	1	2
9	MF	(United States)	14	Danny Szetela	1	0	0	1	2
12	MF	(Croatia)	5	Niko Kranjčar	1	0	0	0	1
12	DF	(Spain)	17	Ayoze	0	0	0	1	1
12	MF	(United States)	26	Eric Calvillo	0	1	0	0	1
12	MF	(United States)	27	Gabriel Farfan	1	0	0	0	1
TOTALS					15	43	2	5	65

=== Own goal scorers ===
Position	Team	Nation	Number	Name	NASL spring season	NASL fall season	NASL Playoffs	U.S. Open Cup	Total
DF	Puerto Rico FC	(Brazil)	2	Cristiano	0	1	0	0	1

=== Disciplinary record ===
Number	Nation	Position	Name	NASL spring season		NASL fall season		NASL Playoffs		U.S. Open Cup		Total	
Number	Nation	Position	Name	Booked	Sent off (straight red)	Booked	Sent off (straight red)	Booked	Sent off (straight red)	Booked	Sent off (straight red)	Booked	Sent off (straight red)
1	(United States)	GK	Jimmy Maurer	0	0	2	0	0	0	0	0	2	0
2	(United States)	DF	Hunter Freeman	2	0	1	0	0	0	0	0	3	0
3	(Kenya)	DF	David Ochieng	0	0	2	0	0	0	0	0	2	0
4	(United States)	DF	Carlos Mendes	1	0	2	0	0	0	0	0	3	0
5	(Croatia)	MF	Niko Kranjčar	2	0	0	0	0	0	0	0	2	0
6	(Brazil)	DF	Rovérsio	0	0	1	0	0	0	0	0	1	0
7	(Bolivia)	FW	Yasmani Duk	0	0	3	0	1	0	0	0	4	0
11	(El Salvador)	MF	Andrés Flores	0	0	3	0	0	0	0	0	3	0
13	(Uruguay)	MF	Sebastián Guenzatti	2	0	4	0	0	0	0	0	6	0
14	(United States)	MF	Danny Szetela	1	0	1	0	0	0	1	0	3	0
15	(Spain)	MF	Ruben Bover	2	0	3	0	0	0	1	0	6	0
16	(Scotland)	MF	Adam Moffat	0	0	2	1	0	0	0	0	2	1
17	(Spain)	DF	Ayoze	3	0	5	0	0	0	2	0	10	0
18	(Venezuela)	MF	Juan Arango	2	0	1	0	1	0	1	0	5	0
19	(Venezuela)	MF	Yohandry Orozco	2	0	1	0	0	0	0	0	3	0
21	(Colombia)	FW	David Diosa	0	0	5	0	0	0	0	0	5	0
23	(United States)	DF	Jimmy Ockford	2	0	2	0	0	0	0	0	4	0
24	(United States)	GK	Brian Holt	0	0	1	0	0	0	0	0	1	0
25	(Costa Rica)	FW	Jairo Arrieta	3	0	1	0	1	0	0	0	5	0
27	(United States)	MF	Gabriel Farfan	1	0	0	0	0	0	0	0	1	0
28	(United States)	MF	Jimmy Mulligan	0	0	2	0	0	0	0	0	2	0
77	(Zimbabwe)	FW	Lucky Mkosana	0	0	1	0	0	0	0	0	1	0
			TOTALS	23	0	43	1	3	0	5	0	74	1

== Transfers ==
=== In ===
No.	Pos.	Player	Transferred from	Fee/notes	Date	Source
25	FW	(Costa Rica) Jairo Arrieta	(United States) D.C. United		14 January 2016	
26	MF	(United States) Eric Calvillo	(United States) Southern California		15 January 2016	
18	MF	(Venezuela) Juan Arango	(Mexico) Tijuana		28 January 2016	
19	MF	(Venezuela) Yohandry Orozco	(Saudi Arabia) Ittihad FC		29 January 2016	
3	DF	(Kenya) David Ochieng	(Saudi Arabia) Al-Taawoun FC		16 February 2016	
5	MF	(Croatia) Niko Kranjčar	(England) Queens Park Rangers	Spring Season	18 March 2016	
2	DF	(United States) Ryan Richter	(United States) Bethlehem Steel FC	Fall Season	20 September 2016	

=== Out ===
No.	Pos.	Player	Transferred to	Fee/notes	Date	Source
7	FW	(Spain) Raúl		Retired	16 November 2015	
19	MF	(Spain) Marcos Senna		Retired	16 November 2015	
23	FW	(United States) Haji Wright	(Germany) Schalke 04	Released	2 January 2016	
20	MF	(United States) Wálter Restrepo	(United States) Philadelphia Union	Transferred	12 January 2016	
8	FW	(Argentina) Gastón Cellerino	(Bolivia) Bolívar		14 January 2016	
3	DF	(United States) Hunter Gorskie	(Poland) Miedź Legnica	Released	14 January 2016	
22	MF	(Brazil) Leo Fernandes	(United States) Philadelphia Union	Loan Return	January 2016	
5	DF	(Paraguay) Samuel Cáceres	(Argentina) Nueva Chicago	Loan Return	January 2016	
18	FW	(United States) Kharlton Belmar	(United States) Portland Timbers 2	Loan Return	January 2016	
8	MF	(Sierra Leone) Michael Lahoud	(United States) Miami FC	Loan Return	23 May 2016	
5	MF	(Croatia) Niko Kranjčar	(Scotland) Rangers F.C.		23 June 2016	
27	MF	(United States) Gabriel Farfan	(United States) Miami FC	Loan Return	23 June 2016	
2	DF	(United States) Hunter Freeman	(United States) Miami FC	Free Transfer	31 August 2016	

=== Loan in ===
No.	Pos.	Player	Loaned from	Fee/notes	Date	Source
8	MF	(Sierra Leone) Michael Lahoud	(United States) Philadelphia Union	Yearlong	12 January 2016	
7	MF	(Bolivia) Yasmani Duk	(Bolivia) Sport Boys Warnes	Spring Season?	22 January 2016	
27	MF	(United States) Gabriel Farfan	(Mexico) Chiapas	Spring Season	26 February 2016	
23	DF	(United States) Jimmy Ockford	(United States) Seattle Sounders FC	Yearlong	1 March 2016	
8	FW	(Italy) Andrea Mancini	(United States) D.C. United		3 September 2016	

=== Loan out ===
No.	Pos.	Player	Loaned to	Fee/notes	Date	Source
?	MF	(United States) Jimmy Mulligan	(United States) Swope Park Rangers	Spring Season	4 March 2016	

=== National team call-ups ===
No.	Pos.	Player	National team	Competition	Date	Source
11	FW	Andrés Flores	El Salvador	2018 FIFA World Cup qualification	25 March 2016	
7	FW	Yasmani Duk	Bolivia	Copa América Centenario	23 May 2016	
7	FW	Yasmani Duk	Bolivia	2018 FIFA World Cup qualification	1 September 2016	
11	FW	Andrés Flores	El Salvador	2018 FIFA World Cup qualification	2 September 2016	
3	DF	David Ochieng	Kenya	2017 Africa Cup of Nations qualification	2 September 2016	
26	MF	Eric Calvillo	United States U20	Stevan Vilotic-Cele Tournament	2 September 2016	
3	DF	David Ochieng	Kenya	Friendly	4 October 2016	
7	FW	Yasmani Duk	Bolivia	2018 FIFA World Cup qualification	6 October 2016	
29	MF	Alexis Velela	United States U20	Training camp	7 October 2016	
