= Steven Diaz =

American soccer player

Personal information
- Full name: Steven Diaz
- Date of birth: May 11, 1986 (age 40)
- Place of birth: Jackson Heights, New York, United States
- Height: 6 ft 0 in (1.83 m)
- Position: Goalkeeper

Youth career
- 2005–2005: LIAC New York

College career
Years	Team	Apps	(Gls)
2005–2008	Briarcliffe Seahawks		

Senior career*
Years	Team	Apps	(Gls)
2007	Brooklyn Knights	10	(0)
2010–2011	Cortuluá		
2011	F.C. New York	5	(0)
2012	Ocala Stampede	13	(0)
2014	Bayamón		
2014	New York Cosmos	0	(0)
2016	New York Cosmos B		
- * Club domestic league appearances and goals as of September 30, 2014

Steven Diaz (born May 11, 1986, in Jackson Heights, New York) is an American soccer player who most recently played for the New York Cosmos.

== Career ==
=== College and amateur ===
Diaz played college soccer at Briarcliffe College, helping his team to the 2008 USCAA Men's Soccer Championship. He was named to the NJCAA All-American 1st Team, the All-Region 1st Team and the All-Conference 1st Team in 2005, and was an ODP New York State Player in 2003, 2004 and 2005.

During his college years Diaz also played in the USL Premier Development League for the Brooklyn Knights.

=== Professional ===
Diaz signed his first professional contract with Cortuluá in Colombia in 2010. In 2011, he trained with New York Red Bulls and later was signed by F.C. New York of the USL Professional Division. He made his debut on April 23, 2011, in a 0–0 tie with the Charlotte Eagles. In 2014, Diaz signed with Bayamón Fútbol Club in Puertor Rico and helped qualify them to the CONCACAF Champions League after participating in the Caribbean Club Championship.

In 2014, Diaz signed with the New York Cosmos where he served as a back-up goalkeeper behind Jimmy Maurer and Kyle Zobeck. He was released following the end of the 2014 season.
