= Sebastián Guenzatti =

Uruguayan footballer (born 1991)

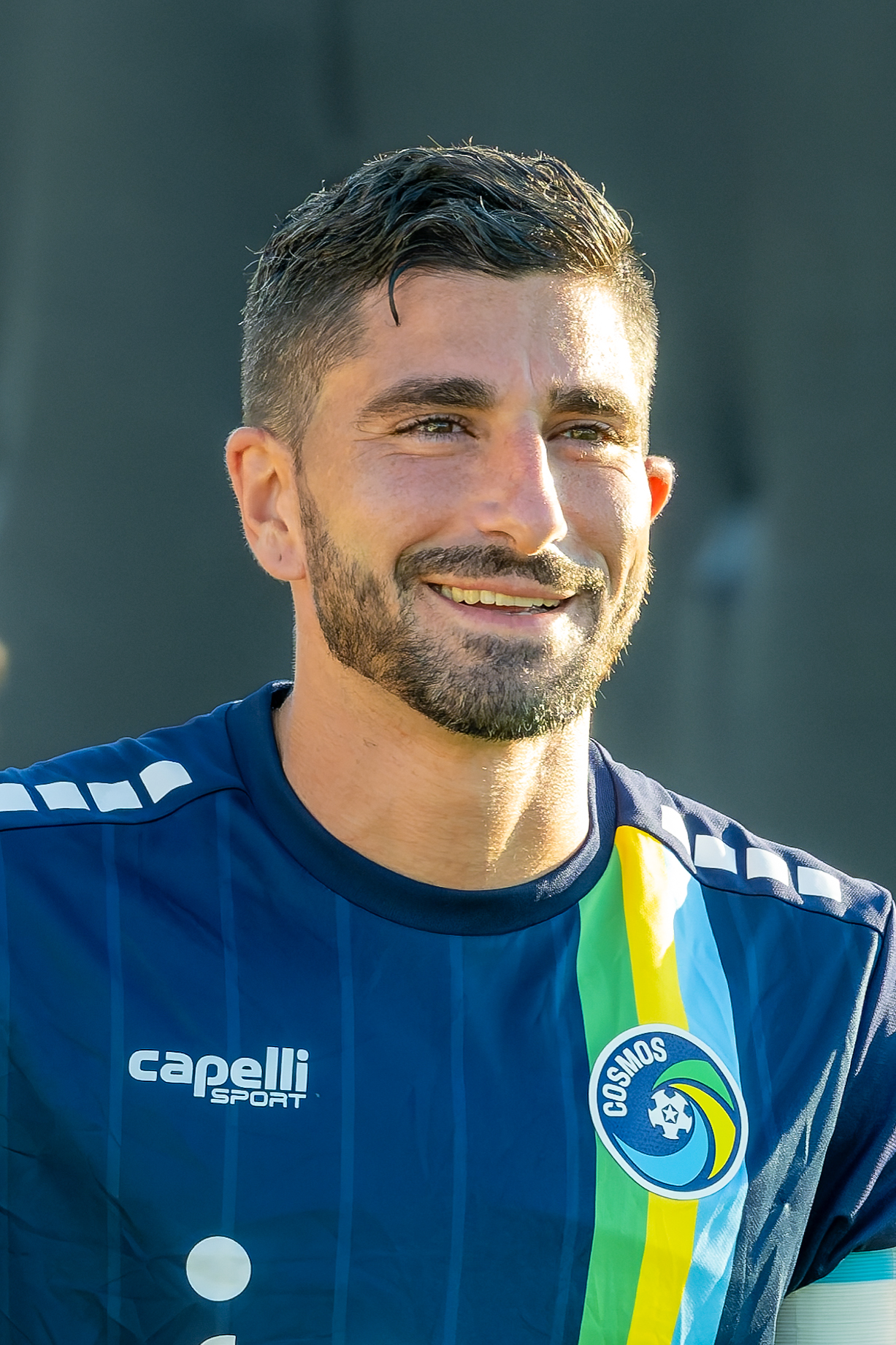
- Guenzatti with the NY Cosmos in 2026

Personal information
- Date of birth: July 8, 1991 (age 35)
- Place of birth: Montevideo, Uruguay
- Height: 1.78 m (5 ft 10 in)
- Positions: Forward; attacking midfielder

Team information
- Current team: New York Cosmos
- Number: 13

Youth career
- 2003–2010: Brooklyn Knights
- 2010–2013: Peñarol

Senior career*
Years	Team	Apps	(Gls)
2013	Huracán	9	(1)
2013–2016	New York Cosmos	82	(10)
2017–2022	Tampa Bay Rowdies	144	(59)
2023–2024	Indy Eleven	61	(16)
2025	Detroit City FC	18	(0)
2026–	New York Cosmos	32	(10)
- * Club domestic league appearances and goals as of 15:52, 3 November 2026 (UTC)

Sebastián Ignacio Guenzatti Varela (born July 8, 1991) is a Uruguayan footballer who currently captains USL League One side New York Cosmos.

== Youth career ==
Guenzatti was born in Uruguay before moving to the United States at age 12, where he grew up in the College Point section of Queens in New York City, and graduated from Francis Lewis High School in Fresh Meadows, where he started for the soccer team all four years. Professional aspirations took Guenzatti back to his homeland, where he played with Peñarol's under-19 team, before moving to Huracán in 2013.

== Senior career ==
=== New York Cosmos ===
Guenzatti moved back to the United States on July 5, 2013, when he signed for NASL club New York Cosmos. He made his debut for the Cosmos on August 10, 2013, in a 0–0 draw against Tampa Bay. Guenzatti scored the game-winning goal in the team's 1–0 win over Minnesota United FC on September 14, 2013, and earned NASL Team of the Week honors for his performance. He scored one goal and recorded one assist in ten matches for the Cosmos during the 2013 season and played 86 minutes during the team's 2013 NASL Soccer Bowl championship game 1–0 victory over the Atlanta Silverbacks.

On January 3, 2014, the Cosmos announced that they had signed Guenzatti to a contract extension. During the 2014 Spring season, Guenzatti was tied for second on the team in scoring, recording two goals and two assists in seven matches as the team posted a 6–2–1 (W–L–D) record and finished in second place in the NASL Spring Standings. He earned NASL Team of the Week honors for his Week 7 goal in the team's 1–1 draw with Indy Eleven. Guenzatti finished the regular season tied for second on the team in scoring with four goals and three assists in 22 appearances (19 starts). He scored the game-winning goal in the team's 1–0 victory over Ottawa Fury FC on July 20, 2014, which earned him NASL Team of the Week honors and he combined with fellow Queens native David Diosa to score in the team's 3–2 win over the Atlanta Silverbacks on September 13, 2014.

In 2015, Guenzatti scored four times in 23 appearances, which included 10 starts. On August 8, 2015, Guenzatti scored in second-half stoppage time as the Cosmos rallied from a three-goal deficit to draw 3–3 with the Fort Lauderdale Strikers at Lockhart Stadium. Guenzatti opened the scoring in back-to-back 3–0 wins over the Atlanta Silverbacks (October 7) and FC Edmonton (October 11). On November 15, 2015, he appeared as a starter in the 3–2 Cosmos victory over Ottawa Fury in the Soccer Bowl 2015 championship game.

Guenzatti remained a key contributor for Cosmos in 2016. On June 29, 2016, Guenzatti scored his first goal of the season in a 3–2 loss to Major League Soccer side New England Revolution, in a round of 16 match in the 2016 U.S. Open Cup. On August 27, 2016 he scored in league play for New York in a 6–1 victory over Carolina Railhawks. However, his 2016 season was cut short when he suffered a torn ACL on October 9.

=== Tampa Bay Rowdies ===
On July 31, 2017, Guenzatti signed with United Soccer League side Tampa Bay Rowdies. On September 30, 2017, Guenzatti scored his first goal for Tampa Bay, a late equalizer in a 1–1 draw with Bethlehem Steel FC at Al Lang Stadium. On September 1, 2018, Guenzatti recorded the first hat trick of his career, leading Tampa Bay to a 3–0 victory over North Carolina FC.

Guenzatti was named team captain ahead of the 2019 season. On March 9, 2019, Guenzatti scored the lone goal of the match from the penalty spot, in an opening day win over Memphis 901 FC. On June 29, 2019, Guenzatti scored the game-winning goal in added time in a 2–1 victory over Ottawa Fury FC. He ended the 2019 campaign scoring a career high 19 goals in 34 matches.

On July 17, 2020, Guenzatti scored his first goal of the season in a 2–2 draw with North Carolina FC. On October 24, 2020, Guenzatti scored the winning goal for the Rowdies as they defeated Louisville City FC with a score of 2–1 in the USL Championship Eastern Conference Final. With the victory, Tampa Bay advanced to the 2020 USL Championship Final, where they were scheduled to play against Phoenix Rising FC. However, the final match was ultimately canceled due to COVID-19 cases within the Rowdies organization, so no champion was crowned for the 2020 season.

Guenzatti continued to be an influential player for Tampa Bay during the 2021 season. On May 1, 2021, Guenzatti scored two goals, in an opening day win over Charlotte Independence. He ended the season with a career high 22 goals, helping lead Tampa Bay to the 2021 USL Championship season Regular Season title. He also helped Tampa Bay to reach the 2021 USL Championship Final, where they would fall 3–1 to Orange County SC.

On January 18, 2022, Guenzatti re-signed with the Rowdies. On October 8, 2022, Guenzatti scored twice in a game against Loudoun United FC, passing his former teammate Georgi Hristov to become the Rowdies all-time scoring leader. On December 13, 2022, Tampa and Guenzatti mutually agreed to terminate his deal to allow him to pursue other opportunities. He subsequently signed with Indy Eleven on the same day.

=== Indy Eleven ===
Guenzatti signed with USL Championship side Indy Eleven ahead of the 2023 season and was subsequently named as the team's captain for the season. Guenzatti made his first appearance for the Eleven against his former Tampa Bay Rowdies in a 1–1 draw on March 11. Guenzatti scored his first goal for Indy Eleven in a 3–2 win against Monterey Bay FC on April 22, bringing his total career USL goal tally to 61.

Guenzatti scored a brace on August 9 in a 4–0 win over the Birmingham Legion, scoring on either side of halftime. The two goals brought his season total to 6. He ended the 2023 season with a team-leading 11 goals and 35 league and domestic appearances, as well as one playoff appearance and three total assists.

On November 17, 2023, Indy Eleven announced they had extended Guenzatti's contract for the 2024 season. Guenzatti scored his first goal in the 2024 season on March 30, in a 2–1 defeat at home to Detroit City FC. He scored the winning goal in a 1–0 home victory over Rhode Island FC on August 7 to break the team's 6 match streak without a win. On 20 November 2024, the club announced Guenzatti would not return following the conclusion of the 2024 season.

=== Detroit City ===
On March 6, 2025, Guenzatti joined USL Championship club Detroit City FC ahead of their 2025 season. He made his debut on March 8 in a 0–2 away victory over Miami FC. He scored his first goal for the club on May 31 in a 4–2 away loss to Portland Hearts of Pine in the USL Cup.

=== Return to Cosmos ===
On November 21, 2025, Guenzatti was announced as the first player signing by the New York Cosmos. On March 28, 2026 Guenzatti scored his first goal on the season, scoring the first of the match in a 2-0 victory over Fort Wayne FC. On May 15, 2026, he scored the opening goal for Cosmos and assisted on another in a 3-2 comeback victory over Westchester SC in a USL Cup match.

== Career statistics ==
As of match played November 3, 2026.

Club	Season	Division	League		Domestic Cup		League Cup		Total	
Club	Season	Division	Apps	Goals	Apps	Goals	Apps	Goals	Apps	Goals
Huracàn	2012–13	Segunda División	9	1	0	0	0	0	9	1
Huracàn	Totals		9	1	0	0	0	0	9	1
New York Cosmos	2013	NASL	11	1	0	0	1	0	12	1
New York Cosmos	2014	NASL	22	4	3	0	1	0	26	4
New York Cosmos	2015	NASL	23	4	3	1	2	0	28	5
New York Cosmos	2016	NASL	26	1	3	1	0	0	29	2
New York Cosmos	Totals		82	10	9	2	4	0	95	12
Tampa Bay Rowdies	2017	USL Championship	9	2	0	0	2	0	11	2
Tampa Bay Rowdies	2018	USL Championship	26	5	1	0	0	0	27	5
Tampa Bay Rowdies	2019	USL Championship	33	18	0	0	1	1	34	19
Tampa Bay Rowdies	2020	USL Championship	15	8	—		3	2	18	10
Tampa Bay Rowdies	2021	USL Championship	31	21	—		5	1	36	22
Tampa Bay Rowdies	2022	USL Championship	30	5	2	0	3	2	35	7
Tampa Bay Rowdies	Totals		144	59	3	0	14	6	161	65
Indy Eleven	2023	USL Championship	33	11	2	0	2	0	37	11
Indy Eleven	2024	USL Championship	28	5	4	0	0	0	32	5
Indy Eleven	Totals		61	16	6	0	2	0	69	16
Detroit City FC	2025	USL Championship	18	0	1	0	4	1	23	1
New York Cosmos	2026	USL League One	32	10	0	0	4	1	36	11
Career totals			346	96	19	2	28	8	393	106

== Honors ==
New York Cosmos

- NASL Spring Championship (1): 2015
- NASL Fall Championship (2): 2013, 2016
- NASL Championship (3): 2013, 2015, 2016

Tampa Bay Rowdies

- Coastal Cup (1): 2020
- USL Championship Eastern Conference (1): 2020
- USL Championship Regular Season Title (1): 2021
