= Lucky Mkosana =

Zimbabwean footballer (born 1987)

Personal information
- Full name: Luckymore Mkosana
- Date of birth: 30 September 1987 (age 39)
- Place of birth: Bulawayo, Zimbabwe
- Height: 5 ft 9 in (1.75 m)
- Position: Forward

College career
Years	Team	Apps	(Gls)
2008–2011	Dartmouth Big Green	73	(44)

Senior career*
Years	Team	Apps	(Gls)
2011	Michigan Bucks	10	(3)
2012–2013	Harrisburg City Islanders	44	(22)
2013	→ Tampa Bay Rowdies (loan)	9	(2)
2014	Tampa Bay Rowdies	27	(2)
2015–2016	New York Cosmos	60	(11)
2017	IFK Mariehamn	9	(2)
2017	New York Cosmos	15	(4)
2018	Penn FC	30	(11)
2019	Louisville City	16	(5)
2019–2023	Tampa Bay Rowdies	71	(13)
- * Club domestic league appearances and goals as of 21 October 2023

Luckymore "Lucky" Mkosana (born 30 September 1987) is a Zimbabwean footballer.

== Playing career ==
=== College and amateur ===
Mkosana played college soccer at Dartmouth College between 2008 and 2011. During his time at Dartmouth, Mkosana was named Ivy League Player of the Year (2011), All-Ivy League First Team (2008, 2009, 2010, 2011), Soccer America Freshman, All-America First Team, College Soccer News Freshman, All-America First Team and Ivy League Rookie of the Year (2008). He became Dartmouth's all-time career leader with 34 career goals, breaking a record that had stood since 1953. Mkosana played for USL Premier Development League club Michigan Bucks in 2011.

Chicago Fire selected Mkosana in the second round (No. 23 overall) of the 2012 MLS SuperDraft, but wasn't signed by the club.

=== Club ===
==== Harrisburg City Islanders ====
Mkosana signed with USL Pro club Harrisburg City Islanders in May 2012. Mkosana became a regular goalscorer for the City Islanders over the next two seasons, scoring 20 goals and providing 4 assists during the regular season play. The latter half of the 2013 season, Mkosana scored 10 goals in the 7 matches (including two hattricks) and earn USL Team of the Week honors for four consecutive weeks.

==== Tampa Bay Rowdies ====
At the conclusion of the USL 2013 season, Mkosana secured a loan deal to Tampa Bay Rowdies in the NASL. After completion of a successful loan spell, Mkosana signed a permanent deal with the Rowdies in January 2014.

==== New York Cosmos ====
On 24 November 2014, Mkosana signed with NASL club New York Cosmos. His performance through most of the 2015 season earned him a contract extension in September 2015, scoring 5 goals in 19 appearances. The striker scored seven goals and added one assist across all competitions for the Cosmos in 2015. Notably, Mkosana scored a 90th-minute equalizing goal against MLS club New York City FC in the U.S. Open Cup, propelling the Cosmos to an eventual win in penalty kicks. During his time with the Cosmos, Mkosana helped the New York team win consecutive NASL championships in 2015 and 2016.

==== IFK Marienhamn ====
On 30 December 2016, Mkosana signed a one-year contract, with the option of a second, with Finnish Veikkausliiga side IFK Mariehamn. He would make 15 appearances for the Finnish champions, scoring 4 goals including 2 goals in the team's run to the quarterfinals of the 2016–17 Finnish Cup.

==== Return to New York Cosmos ====
After a season competing in Finland, Mkosana returned to New York Cosmos in June 2017 to compete in the 2017 Fall season.

==== Penn FC ====
Ahead of the 2018 season, Mkosana returned to Harrisburg signing with the newly branded Penn FC (formerly the Harrisburg City Islanders) in the USL Championship. Despite a difficult season, Mkosana still managed to lead the team in goals, scoring 11 goals through 29 appearances.

==== Louisville City ====
After finishing a single season with Penn FC, Mkosana moved to USL champions, Louisville City FC ahead of the 2019 season. Traded mid-season, Mkosana scored 5 goals in 16 appearances.

==== Return to Tampa Bay Rowdies ====
Despite good performances for Louisville, Mkosana rejoined the Rowdies midway through the 2019 season as part of a trade that saw Antoine Hoppenot go to Louisville. In the 2021 Eastern Conference Final, Mkosana scored twice against Louisville to spur the Rowdies to victory. His first goal in the match came just three minutes after he entered off the bench, and the second goal was the equalizer deep into stoppage time. The two goals made Mkosana the USL Championship's all-time leading scorer as a substitute. Mkosana re-signed with the Rowdies on 20 January 2023. Mkosana was released by Tampa Bay following the 2023 season.

== International career ==
Mkosana received his first international call-up to the Zimbabwe national team for its African Cup of Nations qualifier on 9 September 2018.

== Career statistics ==
As of match played 29 March 2020

Appearances and goals by club, season and competition
Club	Season	League			National Cup		Continental		Total	
Club	Season	Division	Apps	Goals	Apps	Goals	Apps	Goals	Apps	Goals
Harrisburg City Islanders	2012	USL Pro	17	7	1	1	–		27	2
Harrisburg City Islanders	2013	USL Pro	26	14	0	0	–		26	14
Tampa Bay Rowdies (loan)	2013	NASL	9	2	0	0	–		9	2
Tampa Bay Rowdies	2014	NASL	26	2	1	0	–		27	2
New York Cosmos	2015	NASL	29	5	3	2	–		32	7
New York Cosmos	2016	NASL	25	4	3	0	–		28	4
IFK Mariehamn	2017	Veikkausliiga	9	2	6	2	0	0	15	4
New York Cosmos	2017	NASL	11	2	0	0	–		11	2
Penn FC	2018	USL	29	11	1	0	–		30	11
Louisville City	2019	USL	15	4	1	1	–		16	5
Tampa Bay Rowdies	2019	USL	18	6	0	1	–		18	6
Tampa Bay Rowdies	2020	USL	1	0	0	–	–		1	0
Career total			215	59	16	6	0	0	231	65

== Honors ==
New York Cosmos

- North American Soccer League Supporters' Trophy: 2015
- North American Soccer League Soccer Bowl: 2015, 2016
