= Gastón Cellerino =

Argentine footballer

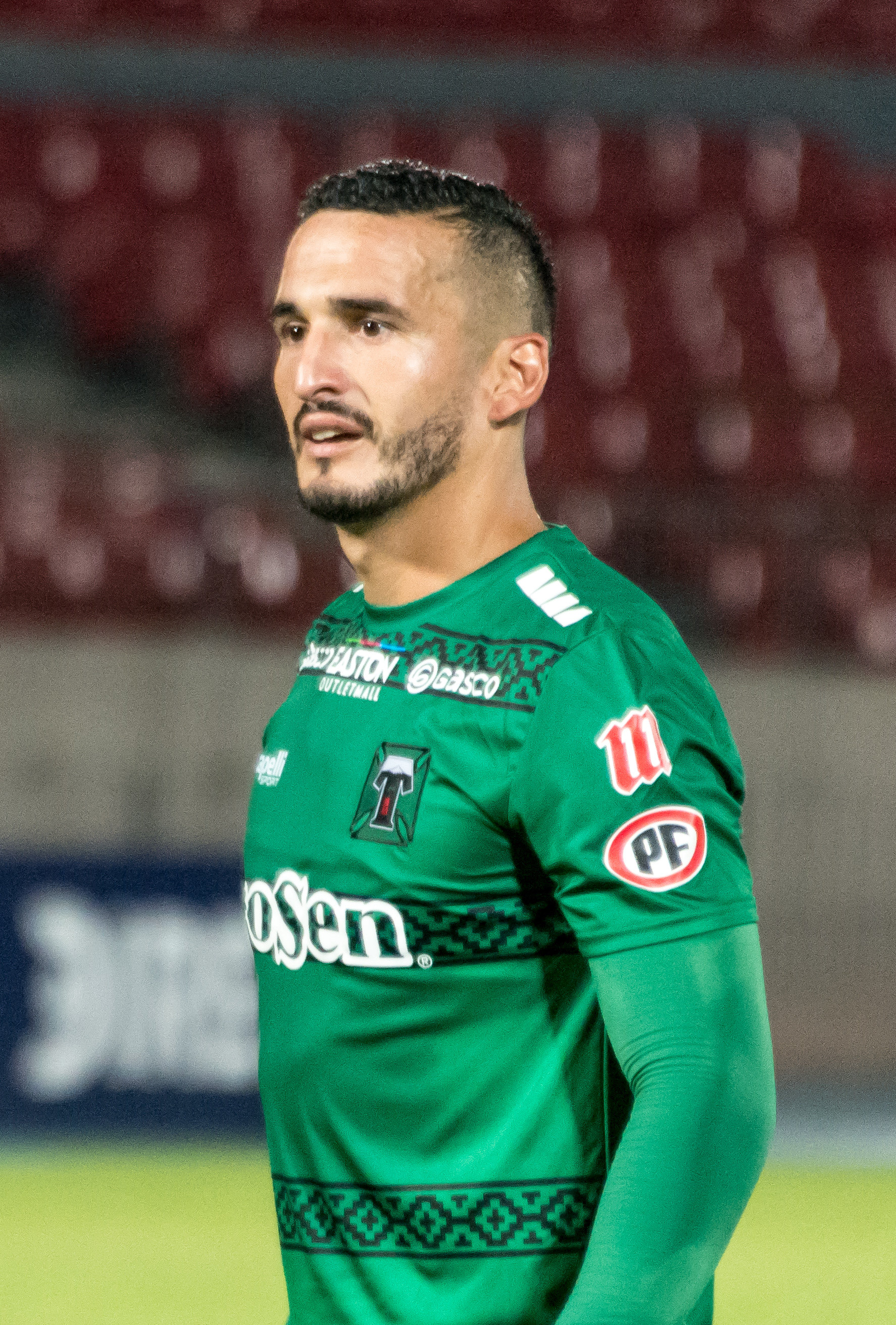
- Cellerino with Deportes Temuco in 2020

Personal information
- Full name: Gastón Andrés Javier Cellerino Grasso
- Date of birth: 26 June 1986 (age 40)
- Place of birth: Viedma, Argentina
- Height: 1.85 m (6 ft 1 in)
- Position: Forward

Team information
- Current team: Gran Peña

Youth career
- 1997–2006: Boca Juniors

Senior career*
Years	Team	Apps	(Gls)
2007	Universidad San Martín	13	(6)
2008	Rangers	31	(22)
2009–2013	Livorno	31	(2)
2010	→ Celta Vigo (loan)	11	(1)
2011	→ Racing Club (loan)	2	(0)
2012	→ Unión La Calera (loan)	24	(11)
2013–2015	Santiago Wanderers	57	(17)
2015	New York Cosmos	10	(5)
2016–2017	Bolívar	30	(11)
2017	FELDA United	12	(1)
2017–2018	Deportivo Pasto	14	(3)
2018–2019	Linense	30	(8)
2019–2020	Deportes Temuco	19	(5)
2021	Ligorna 1922	2	(1)
2021–2024	Rápido de Bouzas	80	(31)
2024–2025	UD Ourense	23	(8)
2025–	Gran Peña	4	(0)
- * Club domestic league appearances and goals as of 28 September 2025

Gastón Andrés Javier Cellerino Grasso (born 26 June 1986) is an Argentine footballer who plays for Spanish Tercera Federación side Gran Peña as a forward.

== Club career ==
Although a supporter of rival club River Plate, Cellerino began his career at Boca Juniors football academy. In January 2007, he left the Boca youth ranks and joined Peruvian first-tier side Universidad San Martín, where he helped the team claim the league title. Shortly afterward, he went on trial with Peñarol but failed to make the team.

Cellerino then signed for Chilean Primera División club Rangers to play the Torneo de Apertura. In his second season, he was runner-up to Lucas Barrios in scoring with 16 goals. however, his most spectacular goal occurred in the playoffs first-leg semifinal against Palestino, when his goal from a bicycle kick was applauded by the referee Carlos Chandía.

On 25 January 2009, it was reported that Cellerino would move to Serie B club Livorno, after refusing other offers from Lazio and Chilean powerhouse Colo-Colo previously. In January 2010, Celta Vigo signed him from Livorno on loan to play in the Liga Adelante. He was loaned again in June 2011 to Argentina's Racing Club, which would mark his first professional spell in his homeland.

On 10 February 2012, after being released by Livorno, Cellerino returned to Chile and signed for first-tier Unión La Calera.

On August 17, 2015, the New York Cosmos announced they had signed Cellerino.

In the second half of 2024, Cellerino signed with UD Ourense from Rápido de Bouzas.

== Honours ==
New York Cosmos

- North American Soccer League (1): 2015

Ligorna 1922

- Eccellenza Liguria (1): 2020–21
