= Andrés Flores =

Salvadoran footballer (born 1990)

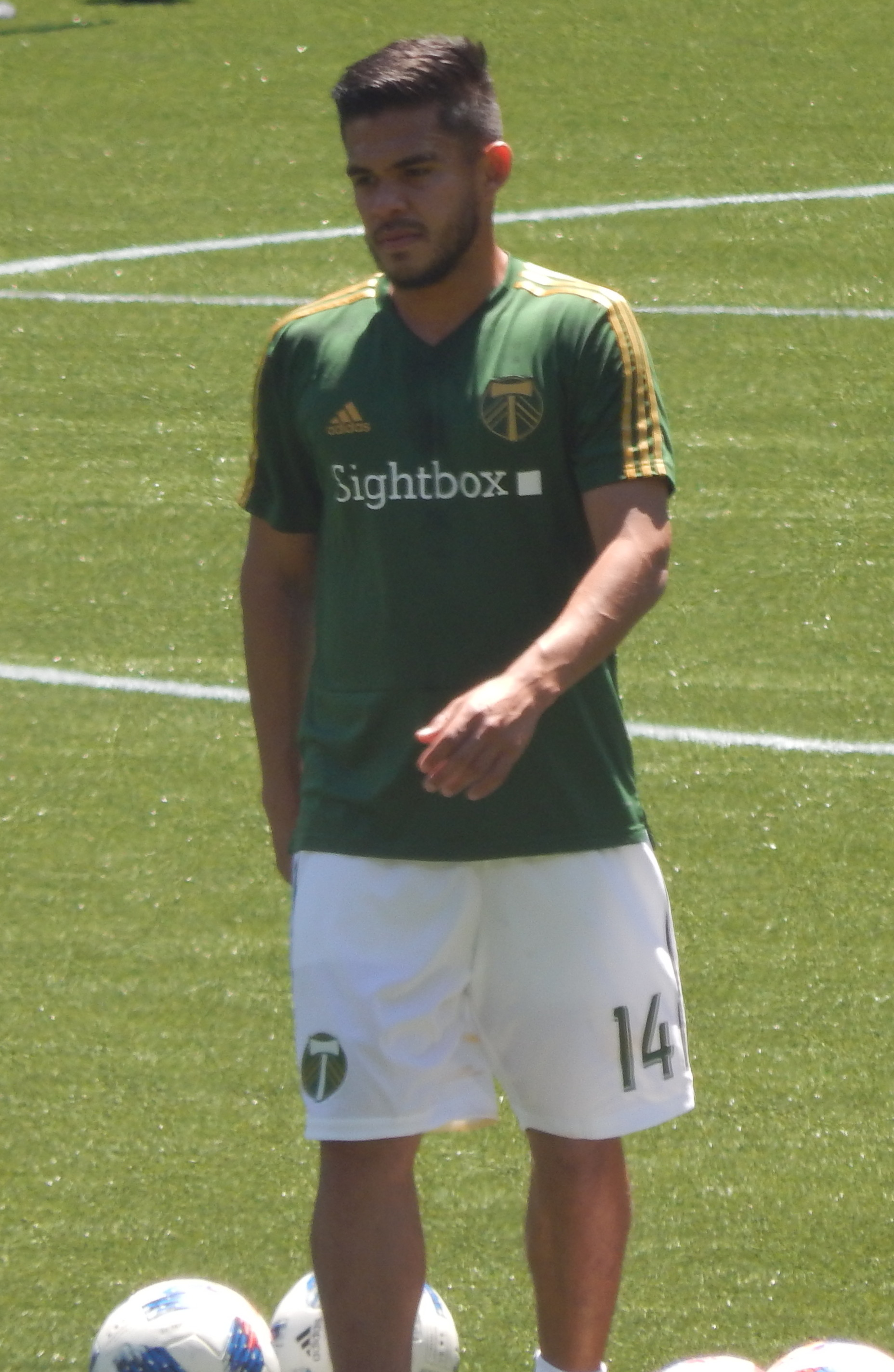
- Flores with the Portland Timbers

Personal information
- Full name: Andrés Alexander Flores Mejía
- Date of birth: August 31, 1990 (age 36)
- Place of birth: San Salvador, El Salvador
- Height: 5 ft 6 in (1.68 m)
- Positions: Midfielder; forward

Team information
- Current team: Portland Timbers 2 (assistant)

Youth career
- 1998–2005: Academia La Chelona
- 2006–2008: River Plate

Senior career*
Years	Team	Apps	(Gls)
2009–2014	Isidro Metapán	80	(8)
2012	→ Viborg (loan)	2	(1)
2014	→ New York Cosmos (loan)	8	(1)
2015–2017	New York Cosmos	71	(9)
2018–2020	Portland Timbers	45	(2)
2019	Portland Timbers 2	1	(0)
2021–2022	Rio Grande Valley FC	12	(0)

International career
2002–2004	El Salvador U15		
2005–2006	El Salvador U17	7	(3)
2007–2009	El Salvador U20	5	(1)
2010	El Salvador U21		
2012	El Salvador U23	5	(3)
2008–2021	El Salvador	65	(0)

Managerial career
- 2022–: Portland Timbers 2 (assistant)
- * Club domestic league appearances and goals as of 7 November 2021

Andrés Alexander Flores Mejía (born 31 August 1990) is a Salvadoran-American professional football manager and former player. He is the current coach of Portland Timbers 2 in the MLS Next Pro.

== Club career ==
Nicknamed Ruso, Flores was signed by top Argentine side River Plate and played for River Plate's Reserves team in 2006–2008. He impressed in Argentina, but was unable to stay due to his age.

Upon returning to El Salvador he signed with A.D. Isidro Metapán in 2009. During his time with the club Metapán enjoyed the greatest period in its history capturing four domestic titles, the last one in December 2011.

On 29 January 2012, Flores signed to first division Danish club Viborg FF. Due to injury he only played one league game, but played several games in the Danish Cup, where he scored two goals. He did not renew his contract with Viborg and went back to El Salvador to play with Metapán.

=== New York Cosmos ===
On 18 July 2014, the New York Cosmos announced that Flores would be signed on loan from Turín FESA F.C. The 23-year-old made his first appearance for the New York Cosmos on 2 August 2014 in a 1–0 loss against the Carolina RailHawks.

On 9 August 2014, Flores scored his first goal for the Cosmos in a 2–1 win over the Atlanta Silverbacks. Flores battled a hamstring injury towards the end of the season and finished the year with one goal and one assist in eight appearances (seven starts) for the Cosmos. Flores also earned NASL Fall Team of the Week honors twice (Week 5, Week 13).

Flores earned multiple call-ups to the El Salvador national team while with the Cosmos including to Copa Centoramericana and multiple friendly matches.

In the 2015 NASL season, Flores started 11 times in 20 appearances, logging 1,044 minutes, while picking up three goals and three assists.

=== Portland Timbers ===
In January 2018, Flores signed with Portland Timbers of Major League Soccer. Portland declined their contract option on Flores following the 2020 season.

=== Rio Grande Valley FC ===
On 27 August 2021, Flores signed with USL Championship side Rio Grande Valley FC.

He announced his retirement from professional football at the age of 31 on February 23, 2022.

== Coaching career ==
On February 24, 2022, a day after announcing his retirement, Flores was appointed as an assistant coach of Portland Timbers 2.

== International career ==
Flores started playing for the U-15 national team, and has been an essential player in the youth national teams. In 2008, El Salvador's manager Carlos de los Cobos called the young Flores to train with the senior team. He made his debut for El Salvador in a March 2008 friendly match against Trinidad & Tobago but was overlooked from May 2008 on, only to be recalled for a September 2010 friendly against Honduras. Flores took part at the 2011 CONCACAF Gold Cup. He was subbed-on at the 78th minute in exchange for Léster Blanco in a friendly on 7 August 2011 against Venezuela. Flores was named as the captain of the El Salvador squad for 2014 Copa Centroamericana. Flores started four matches for El Salvador during the tournament and led the team to an overall record of 2–0–2 (W-D-L) and a fourth-place finish in the tournament.

In August 2018, Flores became a United States citizen.

=== International caps and goals ===
El Salvador's goal tally first.

International appearances and goals
#	Date	Venue	Opponent	Result	Competition	Goals	Minutes played	Extras
1	19 March 2008	Trinidad and Tobago	Trinidad and Tobago	0–1	Friendly	0	?	(substituted off) ?'
2	23 March 2008	Jose Antonio Anzoategui stadium, Puerto la Cruz, Venezuela	Venezuela	0–1	Friendly	0	32	(substituted off) 58'
3	4 September 2010	Los Angeles Memorial Coliseum, Los Angeles, California	Honduras	2–2 (3–4 pen.)	Friendly	0	65	(substituted off) 65'
4	7 September 2010	Los Angeles Memorial Coliseum, Los Angeles, California	Guatemala	0–2	Friendly	0	75	(substituted off) 75'
5	8 October 2010	Estadio Rommel Fernández, Panama City, Panama	Panama	0–1	Friendly	0	82	(substituted off) 82'
6	12 October 2010	Estadio Carlos Ugalde Álvarez, Ciudad Quesada, Costa Rica	Costa Rica	1–2	Friendly	0	46	(substituted off) 46'
7	14 January 2011	Estadio Rommel Fernández, Panama City, Panama	Nicaragua	2–0	2011 Copa Centroamericana	0	58	(substituted off) 58'
8	16 January 2011	Estadio Rommel Fernández, Panama City, Panama	Belize	5–2	2011 Copa Centroamericana	0	39	(substituted on) 51'
9	18 January 2011	Estadio Rommel Fernández, Panama City, Panama	Panama	0–2	2011 Copa Centroamericana	0	13	(substituted on) 77'
10	21 January 2011	Estadio Rommel Fernández, Panama City, Panama	Honduras	0–2	2011 Copa Centroamericana	0	32	(substituted on) 58'
11	23 January 2011	Estadio Rommel Fernández, Panama City, Panama	Panama	0–0 (4–5 pen.)	2011 Copa Centroamericana	0	71	(substituted off) 71'
12	24 March 2011	Estadio Pedro Marrero, Havana, Cuba	Cuba	1–0	Friendly	0	26	(substituted on) 64'
13	29 March 2011	Estadio Cuscatlán, San Salvador, El Salvador	Jamaica	2–3	Friendly	0	44	(substituted on) 46'
14	29 May 2011	Robertson Stadium, Houston, United States	Honduras	2–2	Friendly	0	7	(substituted on) 83'
15	5 June 2011	Cowboys Stadium, Arlington, Texas	Mexico	0–5	2011 CONCACAF Gold Cup	0	67	(substituted off) 67'
16	9 June 2011	Bank of America Stadium, Charlotte, North Carolina	Costa Rica	1–1	2011 CONCACAF Gold Cup	0	72	(substituted off) 72'
17	12 June 2011	Soldier Field, Chicago, Illinois	Cuba	6–1	2011 CONCACAF Gold Cup	0	63	(substituted off) 63'
18	19 June 2011	Robert F. Kennedy Memorial Stadium, Washington, D.C.	Panama	1–1 (a.e.t.) (3–5 pen.)	2011 CONCACAF Gold Cup	0	4	(substituted on) 86'
19	7 August 2011	Robert F. Kennedy Memorial Stadium, Washington, D.C.	Venezuela	2–1	Friendly	0	12+2	(substituted on) 78'
20	3 September 2014	Robert F. Kennedy Memorial Stadium, Washington, D.C.	Guatemala	1–2	2014 Copa Centroamericana	0	90	N/A
21	7 September 2014	Cotton Bowl, Dallas, TX	Honduras	1–0	2014 Copa Centroamericana	0	90	N/A
22	10 September 2014	BBVA Compass Stadium, Houston, TX	Belize	2–0	2014 Copa Centroamericana	0	90	N/A
23	13 September 2014	Los Angeles Memorial Coliseum, Los Angeles, CA	Panama	0–1	2014 Copa Centroamericana	0	90	N/A
24	10 October 2014	Red Bull Arena, Harrison, NJ	Colombia	0–3	Friendly	0	83	(substituted off) 83'
25	14 October 2014	Red Bull Arena, Harrison, NJ	Ecuador	1–5	Friendly	0	38	(substituted off) 38'

== Honours ==
Isidro Metapán

- Primera División de Fútbol de El Salvador: Clausura 2009, Clausura 2010, Apertura 2010, Apertura 2011
- Copa Mesoamericana runner-up: 2011

New York Cosmos

- Soccer Bowl: 2015, 2016
