= Rubén Bover =

Spanish footballer (born 1992)

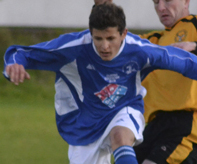
- Bover playing for Halesowen Town in 2010

Personal information
- Full name: Rubén Bover Izquierdo
- Date of birth: 24 June 1992 (age 34)
- Place of birth: Mallorca, Spain
- Height: 1.79 m (5 ft 10 in)
- Position: Attacking midfielder

Team information
- Current team: Atlético Baleares
- Number: 21

Youth career
- 2006–2009: Mallorca
- 2009–2010: Kidderminster Harriers

Senior career*
Years	Team	Apps	(Gls)
2010–2011	Halesowen Town	18	(2)
2011–2013	Charlton Athletic	0	(0)
2012	→ San Roque Lepe (loan)	10	(1)
2013–2015	New York Red Bulls	22	(1)
2015	New York Cosmos B	8	(5)
2015–2016	New York Cosmos	38	(5)
2017–2018	Barnet	27	(0)
2018–2024	Andorra	143	(20)
2024–	Atlético Baleares	55	(6)
- * Club domestic league appearances and goals as of 14 May 2026

Rubén Bover Izquierdo (born 24 June 1992) is a Spanish professional footballer who plays for Atlético Baleares. He plays primarily as an attacking midfielder, but can also play as a winger.

== Club career ==
=== Early career ===
Born in Majorca, Bover began his career at the academy of Mallorca. When he was 17, he moved to England and signed for Conference National side Kidderminster Harriers.

=== Halesowen Town ===
Following his release by cash strapped Kidderminster, he joined Halesowen Town during the summer of 2010. He impressed during pre-season friendlies often playing back up to winger Daryl Taylor. Following Taylor's departure, however, Bover became first choice winger. He scored two goals in 20 appearances for the side, before being offered a trial at then manager, Tony Thorpe's former club Queens Park Rangers. However, the trial was unsuccessful but Bover opted to look for a Football League club opposed to returning to Halesowen Town.

=== Charlton Athletic ===
In July 2011, League One club Charlton Athletic signed Bover after impressing during trials and friendlies played towards the end of the 2010–11 season. Bover made his first competitive start for the club in a 2–1 win over Reading in the League Cup where he hit the post in the last few minutes of the game.

He joined Spanish side CD San Roque de Lepe for the remainder of the 2011–12 season, where he scored one goal in 10 Segunda División B appearances. Bover scored for San Roque de Lepe on 13 May 2012 in a 3–2 victory over Lorca Atlético. On 3 July 2012, Bover signed a one-year contract extension with Charlton.

=== New York Red Bulls ===
In January 2013, Bover began a trial with Major League Soccer side New York Red Bulls and eventually signed for the club on 8 February 2013. On 3 March 2013 Bover made his official debut for New York starting for his new club in a 3–3 draw at Portland Timbers. On 11 October 2014 Bover scored his first MLS goal in a 3–1 victory over Toronto FC. The New York Red Bulls waived Ruben Bover on 12 March 2015, after 22 appearances for the club.

=== New York Cosmos ===
On 15 April 2015, Bover signed for New York Cosmos B. Bover was named NPSL MVP and captured the National Premier Soccer League NPSL regular season title with Cosmos B.

The Spaniard made his first appearance for the Cosmos' first team on 13 June 2015, in a 3–3 draw versus Jacksonville Armada FC. On 4 August 2015, the club announced he had joined the first team permanently.

Bover made 12 appearances and five starts, registering 544 minutes on the field during the 2015 NASL season. He scored his first goal with the top squad on 11 October 2015 against FC Edmonton in a 3-0 New York win at James M. Shuart Stadium. He helped the New York Cosmos win the NASL Championship in 2015.

That season Bover had the opportunity to play alongside Spanish legends Raúl and Marcos Senna at the Cosmos. As a Real Madrid fan, Bover described playing with Raúl as "a dream come true".

=== Barnet ===
On 27 January 2017, Bover joined League Two club Barnet. He made his English Football League debut against Mansfield Town on 4 February 2017. He scored his first goal for Barnet in an EFL Trophy tie against AFC Wimbledon on 29 August 2017. He was released by Barnet at the end of the 2017–18 season.

=== FC Andorra ===
Bover joined FC Andorra on 8 December 2018. He scored on his debut the following day.

=== Atlético Baleares ===
On 6 July 2024, Bover moved to Atlético Baleares in the fourth-tier Segunda Federación.
