= Jimmy Maurer =

American soccer player (born 1988)

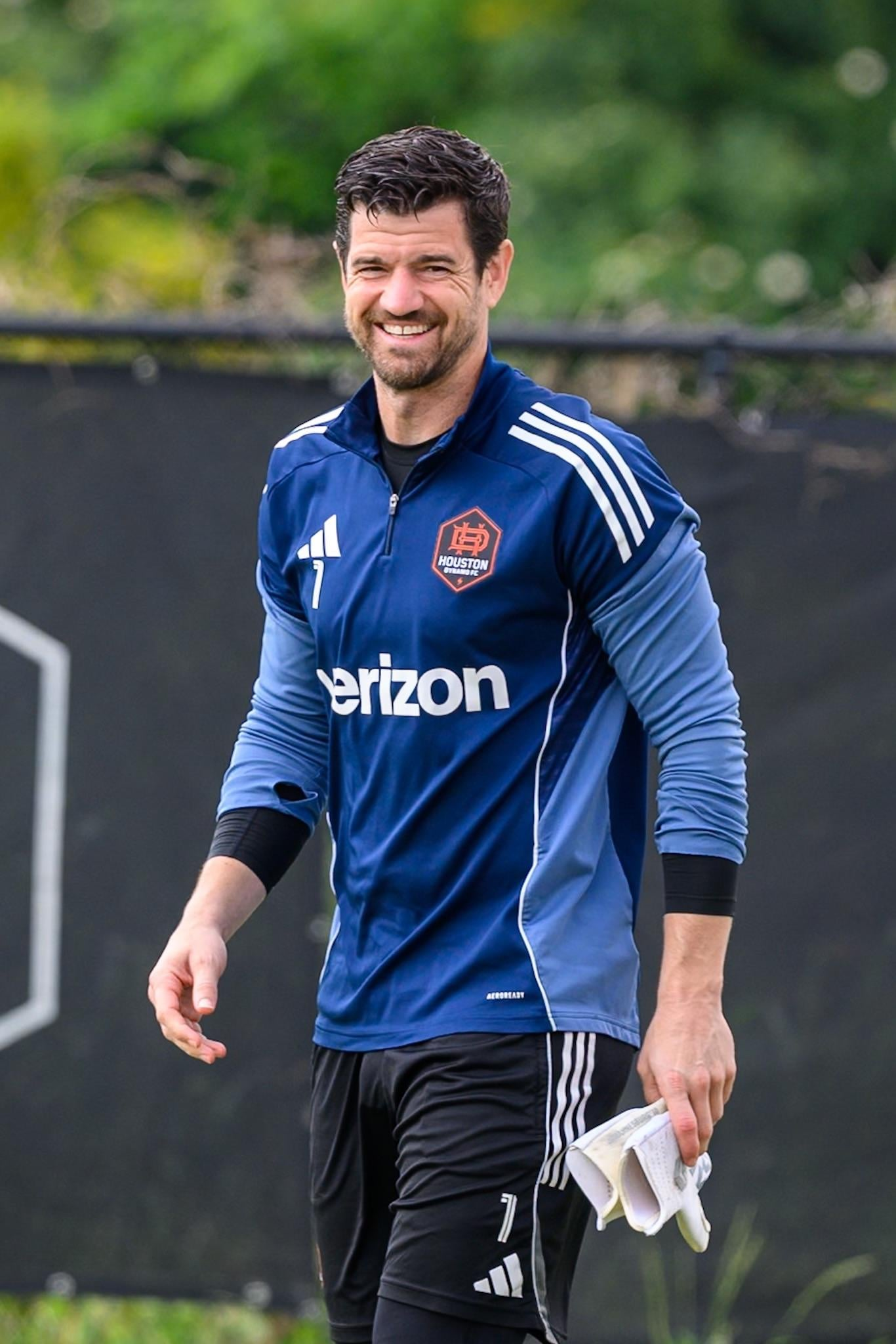
- Maurer in 2025

Personal information
- Full name: James Maurer
- Date of birth: October 14, 1988 (age 38)
- Place of birth: Lawrenceville, Georgia, U.S.
- Height: 6 ft 2 in (1.88 m)
- Position: Goalkeeper

Team information
- Current team: Houston Dynamo
- Number: 1

College career
Years	Team	Apps	(Gls)
2007–2010	South Carolina Gamecocks	78	(0)

Senior career*
Years	Team	Apps	(Gls)
2008	Atlanta Silverbacks U23's	10	(0)
2009	Chicago Fire Premier	14	(0)
2010	Atlanta Blackhawks	5	(0)
2011	New York Red Bulls	0	(0)
2011	Atlanta Silverbacks	17	(0)
2012	Universidad de Concepción	1	(0)
2013–2017	New York Cosmos	105	(0)
2017	→ FC Dallas (loan)	0	(0)
2018–2024	FC Dallas	66	(0)
2019	→ North Texas SC	4	(0)
2025–	Houston Dynamo	2	(0)

International career
2004–2006	United States U17		
- * Club domestic league appearances and goals as of October 25, 2025

James "Jimmy" Maurer (born October 14, 1988) is an American professional soccer player who plays as a goalkeeper for Major League Soccer club Houston Dynamo.

== Career ==
=== High School ===
Maurer graduated from St. Pius X Catholic High School, Atlanta GA in the spring of 2007.

=== College ===
Maurer attended college at the University of South Carolina and was the starting goalkeeper for four years. During his four-year career, he started all 78 games for the Gamecocks. He finished his collegiate career with 28 shutouts, second in South Carolina history. In his first year in 2007, Maurer started all 19 games for the Gamecocks and recorded a 1.08 goals against average. He was also named Conference USA Freshman of the Year. In 2009 as a junior, Maurer played every minute in net for South Carolina and had a 1.22 goals against average to go along with five shutouts and being named to the All-Conference USA Third Team. He was named to the 2010 All-Conference USA Second Team during his senior campaign in which he recorded nine shutouts and a career-high 2,028 minutes in net, including the South Carolina–Clemson rivalry, where he finished off an unprecedented shutout of the derby archrivals.

Maurer played with various clubs in the USL Premier Development League during his collegiate career. In 2008, he played for the Atlanta Silverbacks U23's and in 2009, with Chicago Fire Premier. While with Chicago, he was named the 2009 PDL season Goalkeeper of the Year and played in the PDL Championship game. He concluded his PDL career playing with Atlanta Blackhawks in 2010.

=== Professional ===
Maurer was selected 4th overall in the 2011 MLS Supplemental Draft by the New York Red Bulls. He spent the pre-season with the club but was not signed to a contract. However, the club did sign him to a one-game contract to serve as a backup for a match on March 26, 2011, due to an injury and an international call-up to its two regular keepers.

==== NASL and Chile ====
On March 31, 2011, Maurer signed with the Atlanta Silverbacks of the North American Soccer League. He made his professional debut on April 9, 2011, in a game against the NSC Minnesota Stars

On January 31, 2012, Maurer signed with Club Deportivo Universidad de Concepción of the Chilean Primera División. His relocation to Chile was filmed for an episode of the HGTV show House Hunters International, where he was negotiating on low income rentals as he had not yet signed a contract with the team.

Maurer signed with NASL club New York Cosmos on April 26, 2013. He served as the backup goalkeeper to starter Kyle Reynish during the 2013 NASL season, which ended with a championship when the Cosmos defeated the Atlanta Silverbacks 1–0 to claim the NASL Soccer Bowl. Maurer made his debut with the Cosmos on November 2, 2013, against the Atlanta Silverbacks making four saves and posting a 1–0 shutout victory.

Maurer entered the 2014 NASL season as the starting goalkeeper for the Cosmos. He allowed just three goals during the 2014 Spring season, posting 29 saves and an NASL-leading 0.33 GAA (goals against average) in nine games. Maurer also posted a modern-day NASL record 372 minute shutout streak during the Spring season and achieved a record of 6–1–2 (W-D-L). He recorded a league-high 11 shutouts in 24 appearances for the Cosmos in the 2014 regular season. His 0.91 GAA was second best in the league, and he finished tied for second in the league in saves (67). Maurer posted a 10–7–6 record on the year and was named to the NASL Team of the Week twice during 2014. These accolades resulted in Maurer being named to the NASL Best XI at the conclusion of the 2014 season.

In 2015, Maurer started 28 out of 30 NASL fixtures for the Cosmos, as well as both of the Championship matches. He logged 12 shutouts and a 0.93 GAA in a title-winning season for the Cosmos.

==== FC Dallas ====
On December 18, 2017, Maurer signed with Major League Soccer side FC Dallas. Prior to the 2024 season, Maurer joined the FC Dallas front office as a Player Development Executive in addition to serving his on-field role as a goalkeeper.

== International ==
Maurer was a member of the United States U-17 player pool from 2004 through 2006.

== Club statistics ==
As of match played December 2, 2020

Appearances and goals by club, season and competition
Club	Season	League			National cup		Playoffs		Total	
Club	Season	Division	Apps	Goals	Apps	Goals	Apps	Goals	Apps	Goals
New York Red Bulls	2011	MLS	0	0	—		—		0	0
Atlanta Silverbacks	2011	NASL	17	0	—		—		17	0
Universidad de Concepción	2012	Primera División	1	0	2	0	—		3	0
New York Cosmos	2013	NASL	1	0	—		—		1	0
New York Cosmos	2014	NASL	24	0	3	0	1	0	28	0
New York Cosmos	2015	NASL	28	0	3	0	2	0	33	0
New York Cosmos	2016	NASL	27	0	2	0	2	0	31	0
New York Cosmos	2017	NASL	25	0	1	0	2	0	28	0
New York Cosmos	Total		105	0	9	0	7	0	121	0
FC Dallas (loan)	2017	MLS	0	0	—		—		0	0
FC Dallas	2018	MLS	13	0	1	0	—		14	0
FC Dallas	2019	MLS	2	0	2	0	0	0	4	0
FC Dallas	2020	MLS	18	0	—		2	0	18	0
FC Dallas	Total		31	0	3	0	2	0	36	0
North Texas SC (loan)	2019	USL League One	4	0	—		1	0	5	0
Career total			158	0	14	0	10	0	182	0

== Honors ==
New York Cosmos

- NASL Soccer Bowl: 2013, 2015, 2016
- NASL Regular Season: 2015, 2016

North Texas SC

- USL League One: 2019
