= Kyle Zobeck =

American soccer player (born 1990)

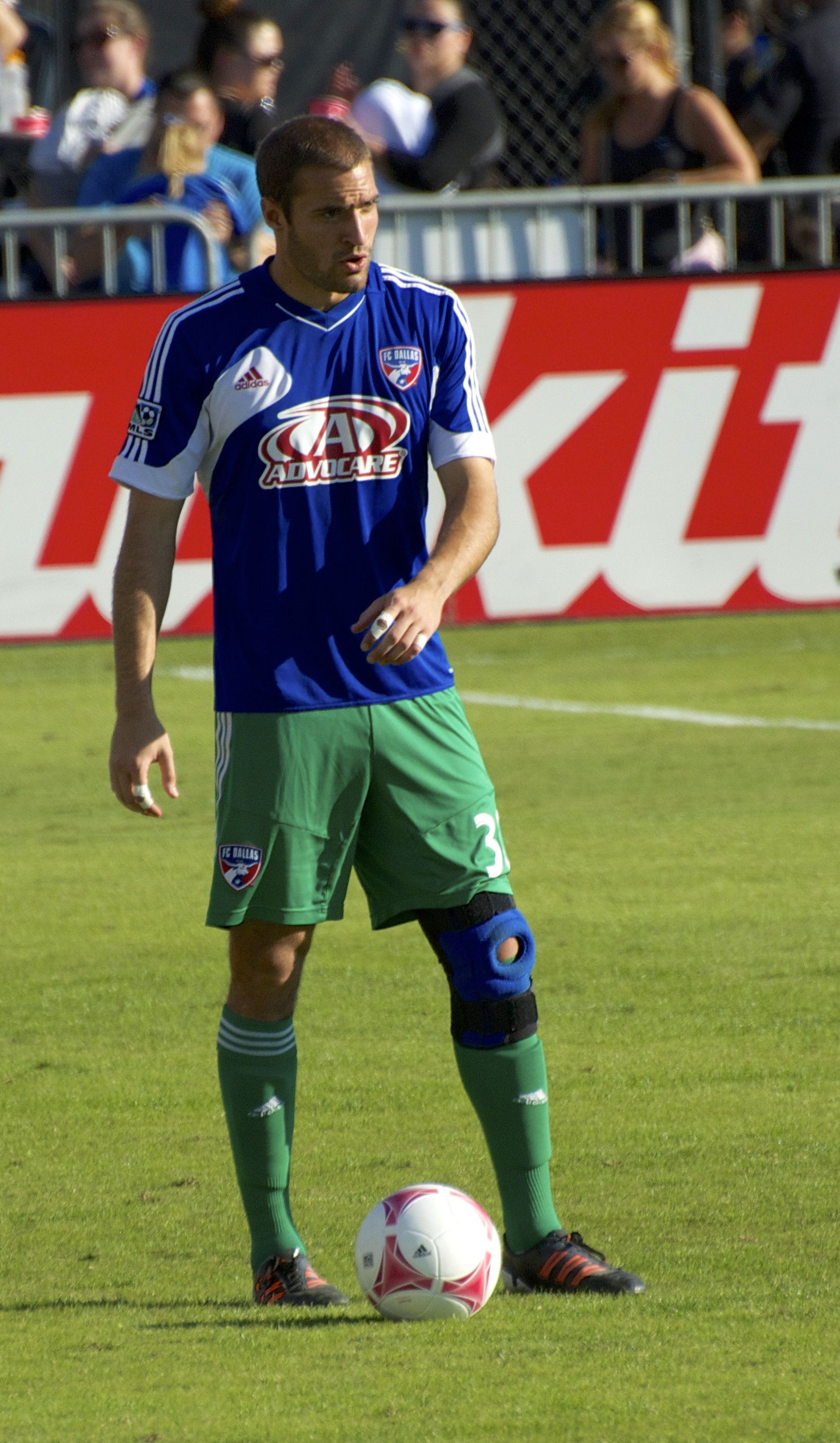
- Warming up in 2013 for FC Dallas

Personal information
- Date of birth: February 6, 1990 (age 36)
- Place of birth: Coralville, Iowa, U.S.
- Height: 6 ft 0 in (1.83 m)
- Position: Goalkeeper

College career
Years	Team	Apps	(Gls)
2008–2012	Valparaiso Crusaders	66	(0)

Senior career*
Years	Team	Apps	(Gls)
2009	Des Moines Menace	1	(0)
2013	FC Dallas	0	(0)
2014–2017	New York Cosmos	8	(0)
2018–2021	FC Dallas	4	(0)
2019	→ North Texas SC	4	(0)

Managerial career
- 2024–: North Texas (assistant)
- * Club domestic league appearances and goals as of November 30, 2021

Kyle Zobeck (born February 6, 1990) is an American former soccer player.

== Career ==
=== College and amateur ===
Born and raised in Iowa, Zobeck played five years of college soccer at Valparaiso University between 2008 and 2012. He was named the Horizon League Goalkeeper of the Year in his junior and senior years at Valparaiso. While at college, Zobeck also appeared for USL PDL club Des Moines Menace in 2009.

=== Professional ===
On January 22, 2013, Zobeck was drafted 26th overall in 2013 MLS Supplemental Draft by FC Dallas. He remained with the club throughout 2013 but was released at the end of the season without making a first-team appearance.

==== New York Cosmos ====
Zobeck signed with NASL club New York Cosmos on March 26, 2014. On August 23, 2014, against Minnesota United FC, he made his professional debut coming in as a substitute in the seventh minute of the match. Zobeck allowed a goal on a penalty kick before shutting out league-leading Minnesota United FC the rest of the way. On August 30, 2014, he made his first professional start in a match against Indy Eleven. Zobeck got his first professional win in a 3–2 victory over the Atlanta Silverbacks on September 13, 2014. He earned his final start of the season on November 1, 2014, making four saves in a 1–0 loss to the San Antonio Scorpions. Zobeck finished the 2014 season with a 1–2–1 (W-D-L) record while making 10 saves and posting a 1.53 goals against average (GAA) while serving as backup goalkeeper to Jimmy Maurer, who earned NASL Best XI honors for his season's performance.

After backing up Maurer again during the 2015 season, Zebeck was re-signed by the club on December 18, 2015. He stayed with the club through the 2017 season with Maurer getting most of the playing time.

==== FC Dallas (second stint) ====
On February 21, 2018, FC Dallas announced that they had signed Zobeck from New York Cosmos. He joined Maurer, who had already signed with the club in December. In 2019, Zobeck played some games on loan with the new Dallas USL League One affiliate, North Texas SC. On October 19, 2019, he started the inaugural USL League One championship game and kept a clean sheet to help North Texas SC win the league's first championship.

On September 2, 2020, Zobeck made his MLS debut after Maurer was forced to leave a match against Sporting Kansas City due to a first half injury with Dallas leading 1–0. The game ended in a 1–1 draw with Zobeck making two saves.

Following the 2021 season, Zobeck was released by Dallas and became a free agent. On December 30, 2021, he announced his retirement from professional soccer.
