= Brian Holt =

American soccer player (born 1988)

Personal information
- Full name: Brian J. Holt
- Date of birth: November 14, 1988 (age 37)
- Place of birth: Omaha, Nebraska, United States
- Height: 5 ft 9 in (1.75 m)
- Position: Goalkeeper

College career
Years	Team	Apps	(Gls)
2008–2011	Creighton Bluejays		

Senior career*
Years	Team	Apps	(Gls)
2011	Reading United	16	(0)
2012–2013	Harrisburg City Islanders	1	(0)
2013–2014	Philadelphia Union	0	(0)
2015–2017	New York Cosmos	10	(0)
2018	Jacksonville Armada	16	(0)
2019	Louisville City	1	(0)
2020	Union Omaha	0	(0)
- * Club domestic league appearances and goals as of October 25, 2020

Brian J. Holt (born November 14, 1988) is an American former professional soccer player who played as a goalkeeper.

== Career ==
=== College ===
Holt played college soccer at Creighton University between 2008 and 2011. In 2011, Holt won numerous awards, including College Cup All-Tournament Team, NSCAA All-America First-Team, NSCAA Midwest Region First-Team, Lowe's Senior CLASS Award Recipient, MAC Hermann, College Soccer News All-America First-Team, Capital One CoSIDA Academic All-America of the Year, Capital One CoSIDA Academic All-America First-Team, Capital One CoSIDA Academic All-Region VII First-Team, MVC Goalkeeper of the Year, First-Team All-MVC, MVC Tournament MVP and MVC Scholar-Athlete First Team.

Holt also played for USL Premier Development League club Reading United AC in 2011.

=== Professional ===
Holt signed with USL Pro club Harrisburg City Islanders in May 2012.

On February 3, 2014, Holt signed with MLS club Philadelphia Union.

On March 9, 2015, Holt signed with the New York Cosmos of the North American Soccer League. He was re-signed by the Cosmos on January 4, 2016.

On April 2, 2018, Holt joined the Jacksonville Armada of the National Premier Soccer League.

On 29 April 2019, Holt signed with Louisville City FC.
