= Jimmy Mulligan =

American soccer player (born 1991)

Personal information
- Full name: James Nicholas Mulligan
- Date of birth: August 12, 1991 (age 35)
- Place of birth: Medford, New York, United States
- Height: 5 ft 8 in (1.73 m)
- Position: Midfielder

Youth career
- 2006–2009: Eastern New York YSA
- 2009–2013: St. John's Red Storm

Senior career*
Years	Team	Apps	(Gls)
2011–2012	Long Island Rough Riders	16	(1)
2014–2017	New York Cosmos	48	(1)
2016	→ Swope Park Rangers (loan)	17	(0)
2018	Portland Timbers 2	23	(0)
2019	FC Motown	1	(0)
- * Club domestic league appearances and goals as of January 1, 2020

James Nicholas Mulligan (born August 12, 1991) is an American soccer player.

== Youth ==
Mulligan was born in Medford, NY and attended Patchoge-Medford High School.

== College ==
Mulligan played soccer at St. John's University from 2009 to 2013 and finished his Red Storm career by earning both third team NSCAA All-Northeast Region accolades and second team All-BIG EAST honors. In his senior year, Mulligan served as the Red Storm's team captain and helped lead St. John's to the 2013 NCAA Tournament Second Round.

Mulligan was also the first St. John's player to earn NSCAA/adidas Scholar All-America honors since 2008. Over the course of his collegiate career, Mulligan appeared in all 80 games over the past four seasons for the Red Storm, including 66 starts. The midfielder totaled eight goals, three game-winners, and nine assists for 25 points.

== Club career ==
Mulligan signed with the New York Cosmos on April 11, 2014, ahead of the team's season opener.

In July 2014, Mulligan was reunited with former Red Storm teammate Connor Lade who was signed by the Cosmos on loan from the New York Red Bulls

Mulligan made his professional debut on October 25, 2014, earning the start at right back in a 2–2 draw with the Tampa Bay Rowdies. Mulligan earned a second consecutive start the following weekend in a 1–0 loss at the San Antonio Scorpions in the regular season finale.

Mulligan finished the 2014 season with two appearances in two starts and 180 minutes played for the Cosmos.

In 2019 he was playing for FC Motown in the National Premier Soccer League.
