= Hunter Gorskie =

American soccer player

Personal information
- Full name: Hunter J. Gorskie
- Date of birth: June 27, 1991 (age 35)
- Place of birth: New York, New York, United States
- Height: 5 ft 11 in (1.80 m)
- Position: Defender

Youth career
- 2008–2009: Players Development Academy

College career
Years	Team	Apps	(Gls)
2009–2012	Stanford Cardinal	71	(1)

Senior career*
Years	Team	Apps	(Gls)
2010	Central Jersey Spartans	4	(0)
2011	Chicago Fire Premier	10	(1)
2012	New Jersey Rangers	2	(0)
2013–2015	New York Cosmos	45	(0)
2016–2017	Miedź Legnica	27	(0)
2017–2018	Tampa Bay Rowdies	42	(5)
2019	Thisted FC	13	(1)
2019	Loudoun United	6	(0)
2020	San Antonio FC	13	(1)
2021	FC Edmonton	25	(0)
2022	Orange County SC	12	(0)
2022	Monterey Bay	13	(0)
- * Club domestic league appearances and goals

Hunter J. Gorskie (born June 27, 1991) is an American former professional soccer player who played as a defender.

== Career ==
=== Youth, college and amateur ===
Gorskie grew up in Marlboro Township, New Jersey and played soccer at Marlboro High School, where he set the career record in assists and is ranked second in career goals.

He played club soccer for the Player Development Academy of New Jersey before committing to Stanford University where he played for four years. In 2009, Gorskie started all 20 games for the Cardinal and helped them to nine clean sheets, including three in the Pac-10 tournament and two in the NCAA Tournament. In 2010, Gorskie made 16 appearances, including four starts, and helped the Cardinal defense to a 1.14 goals against average. One of his four starts came on October 15 in Stanford's 2–1 upset victory over #13 UCLA. He also went on to be named Pac-10 honorable mention All-Academic. In 2011, he started all 17 games in which he saw action and scored his first collegiate goal on September 25 in a 2–1 victory over Vermont. He went on to be named Pac-12 All-Academic second team that same year. In his final season at Stanford, Gorskie started in all 18 games and was named second team All-Pac-12 and Pac-12 All-Academic first team.

Gorskie was one of the few 2 time captains at Stanford Soccer, serving as a leader in both his Junior and Senior seasons. During his time in college, Gorskie also played in the Premier Development League for Central Jersey Spartans, Chicago Fire Premier and New Jersey Rangers.

=== Professional ===
After going undrafted in the 2013 MLS SuperDraft, Gorskie went on trial with San Jose Earthquakes and made two reserve league appearances for them before signing his first professional contract with North American Soccer League club New York Cosmos on April 26, 2013. He made his professional debut on August 3 in a 2–1 victory over Fort Lauderdale Strikers in the opening match of the NASL fall season. Gorskie went on to make eight appearances for the Cosmos during the 2013 NASL season that culminated in the team defeating the Atlanta Silverbacks 1–0 to claim the NASL Soccer Bowl title.

On September 13, 2014, Gorskie recorded his first professional assist in a 3–2 victory over the Atlanta Silverbacks. Gorskie started the final three games of the Cosmos season, including the team's NASL Championship semifinal against the San Antonio Scorpions as a central defender. Gorskie was named the team captain for the final regular season match of the year on November 1, 2014, against the San Antonio Scorpions. Gorskie finished the 2014 season with seven starts in 13 appearances across 672 minutes of action and recorded one assist after coming back from an injury earlier that year.

Gorskie made 27 appearances in the 2015 season with the Cosmos that culminated in another NASL Championship, his second professional title. 23 of those appearances were starts, one of which came against MLS side NYCFC in the US Open Cup, which would end up being one of Gorskie's most memorable performances. The game ultimately went to a penalty shootout to decide a winner of the first ever East River Derby between the two franchises with Gorskie scoring the winning penalty kick.

Gorskie made a move abroad following the 2015 Championship season to Polish I liga side Miedź Legnica. He joined half-way through the season and made an immediate impact at left-back, helping the team to seventh-place finish at the end of the 2015–16 season. Gorskie would finish his stint with Miedź recording 29 appearances in total, playing at both left and right back.

Following his first experience playing abroad, Gorskie returned to the US, signing with the Tampa Bay Rowdies towards the end of their 2016–2017 season. He scored a header in his debut for the Rowdies against New York Red Bull II on September 2, 2017. He would go on to score 2 more goals and start in the remainder of the 8 games that season including in the Conference Semi-Finals of the USL Playoffs where the Rowdies season would ultimately come to an end.

In his 2017–2018 season with the Rowdies, Gorskie appeared as a team captain and completed a team-high 34 matches with over 2,900 minutes played and another 2 goals.

On February 14, 2019, Hunter joined Danish 1st Division club Thisted FC on a free transfer for the rest of the season.

After playing overseas for a second time, Hunter signed with Loudoun United in their inaugural season on September 24, 2019, with just 7 games left in the season.

The following season, Gorskie joined San Antonio FC on January 2, 2020. Gorskie was again a team Captain in San Antonio and made appearances at both center back and center midfield, scoring 1 goal in the shortened season.

On June 9, 2021, Gorskie signed with Canadian Premier League side FC Edmonton. On February 9, 2022, the club announced that Gorskie and all but two other players would not be returning for the 2022 season.

Gorskie signed with USL Championship side Orange County SC on March 9, 2022.

On July 8, 2022, Gorskie moved to USL Championship club Monterey Bay. Gorskie's contract expired at the end of the season.

== Personal life ==
Hunter's older brother Jason, who played college soccer at the University of Pennsylvania, played professionally for Polish II liga side Wisła Puławy as well as in Norway, Malta, and Israel. Hunter co-hosts the Go Get It Podcast with his former Stanford Soccer teammate and ultra-marathon runner, Austin Meyer, where the two cover a range of topics pertaining to having a growth mindset with the intention of inspiring people and being inspired to go get into action.
