= David Diosa =

Colombian footballer (born 1992)

Personal information
- Full name: David Diosa
- Date of birth: December 4, 1992 (age 33)
- Place of birth: Medellín, Colombia
- Height: 5 ft 6 in (1.68 m)
- Positions: Full back; winger; forward

Team information
- Current team: Valley United
- Number: 12

Youth career
- –2005: Bolaños
- 2005–2010: BW Gottschee
- 2010–2011: New York Cosmos

Senior career*
| Years | Team | Apps | (Gls) |
| 2013–2016 | New York Cosmos | 39 | (4) |
| 2017 | Oklahoma City Energy | 0 | (0) |
| 2017 | New York Cosmos | 1 | (0) |
| 2018 | Real Monarchs | 0 | (0) |
| 2019 | New York Cosmos | 6 | (0) |
| 2020 | Richmond Kickers | 6 | (0) |
| 2021 | New Amsterdam | 15 | (1) |
| 2022– | Valley United | 1 | (0) |
- * Club domestic league appearances and goals as of March 31, 2022

David Diosa (born 4 December 1992) is a Colombian footballer who currently plays for Valley United FC in the National Independent Soccer Association (NISA).

== Personal ==
Diosa was born in Medellin, Colombia and moved to the United States with his mother and sister when he was 11 years old. Diosa grew up in Jackson Heights and attended Martin Luther King High School.

== Club career ==
In 2010, Diosa was a member of the New York Cosmos Academy Under-18 team. Diosa scored the first goal for a Cosmos side in 25 years when he scored for the U-18 team in a U.S. Soccer Development Academy match against Connecticut's South Central Premier. Diosa also scored in a match against Newtown Pride FC.

In 2011, he was a member of the New York Cosmos Under-23 that participated in the Premier Development League.

== Professional career ==
Diosa signed with the New York Cosmos on July 5, 2013, and made his professional debut in the Cosmos’ 1–0 victory over Atlanta on November 2, 2013, when he played 38 minutes as a substitute.

Diosa scored his first professional goal on August 30, 2014, in the team's 2–2 draw at Indy Eleven. Diosa finished the 2014 season with one goal and one assist in nine appearances for the team. On December 3, 2015, it was announced that the Cosmos had signed Diosa to a contract extension.

In 2017, Diosa signed with OKC Energy FC, but was transferred back to the Cosmos a month later.

On April 6, 2021, Diosa was signed by National Independent Soccer Association side New Amsterdam FC ahead of the 2021 Spring NISA season.
