= 2013 Fort Lauderdale Strikers season =

Fort Lauderdale Strikers
2013 season
- Owner: Traffic Sports USA
- Head coach: Günter Kronsteiner
- NASL: Spring Season: Seventh; Fall Season: Fifth
- U.S. Open Cup: Third round
- Top goalscorer: League: David Foley, Scott Gordon, Darnell King (2 goals); All: Mark Anderson, David Foley, Scott Gordon, Darnell King (2 goals)
- Highest home attendance: 5,201 (spring) _ (fall)
- Lowest home attendance: 3,285 (spring) _ (fall)
- Average home league attendance: 4,314 (spring _ (fall)
Home colours	Away colours

The 2013 Fort Lauderdale Strikers season was the third season of the team in the North American Soccer League, and the entire club's thirty-ninth season in professional soccer. The NASL inaugurated a new format this year in which the season would be split into two, having a spring and fall tournament. The team finished in seventh place during the spring season, and fifth during the fall season.

== Squad ==
=== Roster ===
Note: Flags indicate national team as defined under FIFA eligibility rules; some limited exceptions apply. Players may hold more than one non-FIFA nationality.

No.	Pos.	Nation	Player
1	GK	USA	Cody Laurendi
2	DF	USA	Stefan Antonijevic
3	DF	COL	Daniel Arcila
5	DF	FIN	Toni Ståhl (captain)
6	MF	USA	Hosman Ramos
7	FW	ENG	David Foley
8	MF	BRA	Pecka
9	FW	URU	Martin Nuñez
10	MF	USA	Walter Restrepo
12	DF	HON	Iván Guerrero
13	DF	USA	Justin Chavez
14	MF	COL	Carlos Salazar
15	DF	USA	Scott Gordon

No.	Pos.	Nation	Player
16	FW	USA	Bradlee Baladez (on loan from FC Dallas)
17	DF	USA	Bryan Gaul (on loan from LA Galaxy)
18	DF	HAI	Stéphane Guillaume
19	MF	ARG	Gonzalo De Mujica
20	MF	ENG	Mark Anderson
21	DF	USA	Darnell King
22	GK	USA	Lionel Brown
23	MF	USA	Manny Gonzalez
24	GK	USA	Matt Glaeser
30	GK	MEX	Richard Sánchez (on loan from FC Dallas)
33	DF	BRA	Rafael Alves
34	MF	USA	Kenney Walker (on loan from LA Galaxy)
99	FW	USA	Aly Hassan

=== Squad Breakdown ===
Updated May 16, 2012.

No.	Name	Nationality	Position	Date of birth (age)	Previous club
Goalkeepers
1	Cody Laurendi	(United States)	GK	August 15, 1988 (age 38)	Puerto Rico Islanders
22	Lionel Brown	(United States)	GK	September 17, 1987 (age 38)	(United States) University of Connecticut
24	Matt Glaeser	(United States)	GK	April 27, 1985 (age 41)	(Finland) Pallo-Iirot
30	Jeff Attinella	(United States)	GK	September 29, 1988 (age 37)	(United States) Real Salt Lake
Defenders
2	Stefan Antonijevic	(Serbia) \ (United States)	CB	January 24, 1989 (age 37)	(United States) Valparaiso Crusaders
3	Daniel Arcila	(Colombia)	LB	October 15, 1993 (age 32)	(Colombia) Deportivo Olimpico
5	Toni Ståhl	(Finland)	CB	May 11, 1985 (age 41)	(United States) Philadelphia Union
12	Iván Guerrero	(Honduras)	LB	November 30, 1977 (age 48)	(Honduras) C.D. Motagua
13	Justin Chavez	(United States)	CB	March 23, 1990 (age 36)	(United States) Tulsa Golden Hurricane
15	Scott Gordon	(United States)	FB/CB	April 6, 1988 (age 38)	(United States) Chivas USA
18	Stéphane Guillaume	(Haiti)	RB	February 9, 1984 (age 42)	(United States) Cleveland City Stars
44	Shavar Thomas	(Jamaica) \ (United States)	CB	January 29, 1981 (age 45)	(Canada) Montreal Impact
Midfielders
6	Hosman Ramos	(El Salvador) \ (United States)	AM	August 26, 1989 (age 37)	(United States) Blue Star Honduras
8	Pecka	(Brazil)	DM	May 2, 1989 (age 37)	(Brazil) Flamengo
10	Walter Restrepo	(United States) \ (Colombia)	AM	June 21, 1988 (age 38)	(Colombia) Boyacá Chicó
14	Carlos Salazar	(Colombia)	AM	July 1, 1981 (age 45)	(Panama) Tauro FC
16	Mike Dietze	(United States)	DM	July 19, 1989 (age 37)	(United States) Seton Hall Pirates
17	Eduardo Jiménez	(Puerto Rico)	AM	December 18, 1990 (age 35)	(United States) UCF Knights
19	Gonzalo De Mujica	(Argentina) \ (United States)	AM	January 31, 1990 (age 36)	(United States) Orlando City U-23
20	Mark Anderson	(England)	AM	February 13, 1989 (age 37)	(United States) Barry University
21	Darnell King	(United States)	W/FB	September 23, 1990 (age 35)	(United States) Florida Atlantic University
23	Manny Gonzalez	(Colombia) \ (United States)	DM	June 3, 1990 (age 36)	(United States) FGCU Eagles
25	Rubens	(Brazil)	DM	October 12, 1989 (age 36)	(Brazil) Mato Grosso do Sul
Forwards
7	David Foley	(England)	W	December 5, 1987 (age 38)	Puerto Rico Islanders
9	Jemal Johnson	(England)	W	March 5, 1985 (age 41)	(England) Tamworth FC
11	Stefan Dimitrov	(Bulgaria) \ (United States)	ST	October 8, 1984 (age 41)	(United States) New York Cosmos
26	Andy Herron	(Costa Rica)	ST	March 2, 1978 (age 48)	(Costa Rica) Limón
99	Aly Hassan	(United States)	ST	May 15, 1989 (age 37)	(Bolivia) Club Aurora

=== Transfers ===
==== In ====
No.	Pos.	Player	Previous club	Notes	Date	Source
7	FW	(England) David Foley	Puerto Rico Islanders	Undisclosed	January 14, 2013	
12	MF	(Honduras) Iván Guerrero	Unattached	Free	January 24, 2013	
19	MF	(Argentina) Gonzalo De Mujica	(United States) Orlando City U-23	Free	January 31, 2013	
23	MF	(United States) Manny Gonzalez	Unattached	Free	January 31, 2013	
3	DF	(Colombia) Daniel Arcila	(Colombia) C.D. Olimpia	Undisclosed	March 8, 2013	
11	FW	(Bulgaria) Stefan Dimitrov	(United States) New York Cosmos	Spring Championship Season loan	March 9, 2013	
44	DF	(Jamaica) Shavar Thomas	(Canada) Montreal Impact	Undisclosed	March 11, 2013	
25	MF	(Brazil) Rubens	Unattached	Free	March 20, 2013	
1	GK	(United States) Cody Laurendi	Puerto Rico Islanders	Free	March 25, 2013	
2	DF	(United States) Stefan Antonijevic	Unattached	Free	March 25, 2013	
13	DF	(United States) Justin Chavez	Unattached	NASL Combine	March 25, 2013	
14	MF	(Colombia) Carlos Salazar	Unattached	Free	March 25, 2013	
16	MF	(United States) Mike Dietze	Unattached	NASL Combine	March 25, 2013	
18	DF	(Haiti) Stéphane Guillaume	Unattached	Open tryout	April 1, 2013	
17	MF	(Puerto Rico) Eduardo Jiménez	UCF Knights	Free	April 1, 2013	
9	FW	(England) Jemal Johnson	Unattached	Free	April 5, 2013	
99	FW	(United States) Aly Hassan	(Bolivia) Club Aurora	Loan return	April 27, 2013	
30	GK	(United States) Jeff Attinella	(United States) Real Salt Lake	Loan	May 8, 2013	
11	FW	(United States) Jahbari Willis	(United States) Atlanta Silverbacks	Trade for Andy Herron	June 13, 2013	
	GK	(Mexico) Richard Sánchez	(United States) FC Dallas	On loan for Fall NASL Season	June 23, 2013	

==== Out ====
No.	Pos.	Player	Transferred to	Fee/notes	Date	Source
9	FW	(United States) Abe Thompson		Retired	October 4, 2012	
16	DF	(Jamaica) Lance Laing	(Canada) FC Edmonton	Free	November 25, 2012	
15	FW	(United States) Aly Hassan	(Bolivia) Club Aurora	Spring Championship Season loan	January 9, 2013	
1	GK	(United States) Dave Martin	(United States) VSI Tampa Bay FC	Free		
2	MF	(United States) Alfonso Motagalvan	(United States) Pittsburgh Riverhounds	Free		
12	DF	(United States) Emilio Orozco	(United States) Chivas USA	Free	February 27, 2013	
3	DF	(United States) Scott Lorenz		Released		
6	DF	(Jamaica) Nickardo Blake		Released		
7	MF	(United States) Patrick Otte	(United States) Ventura County Fusion	Released		
11	FW	(Mexico) Leopoldo Morales		Released		
13	DF	(United States) Jack Stewart		Released		
14	MF	(United States) Abel Gebor		Released		
25	DF	(United States) Nico Clavijo		Released		
30	GK	(United States) Jeff Attinella	(United States) Real Salt Lake	End of loan	June 4, 2013	
11	FW	(Bulgaria) Stefan Dimitrov	(United States) New York Cosmos	End of loan	June 10, 2013	
26	FW	(Costa Rica) Andy Herron	(United States) Atlanta Silverbacks	Trade for Jahbari Willis	June 13, 2013	
9	FW	(England) Jemal Johnson	(United States) New York Cosmos	Only under contract with the Strikers for the Spring season	July 7, 2013	
44	DF	(Jamaica) Shavar Thomas		Only under contract with the Strikers for the Spring season	July 7, 2013	

=== Contracts ===
New contracts and contract extensions.

Player	Date	Length	Contracted until	Reference / Notes
(Brazil) Pecka	October 17, 2012	2 Years	2013, with a club option for 2014	
(England) Mark Anderson	October 24, 2012	3 Years	2013, with a club option for 2014, 2015	
(United States) Walter Restrepo	November 19, 2012	1 Years	2013	
(United States) Scott Gordon	November 19, 2012	1 Years	2013	
(United States) Matt Glaeser	November 19, 2012	1 Years	2013	
(United States) Hosman Ramos	November 19, 2012	1 Years	2013	
(Costa Rica) Andy Herron	December 19, 2012	2 Years	2013, with a club option for 2014	
(Finland) Toni Ståhl	March 11, 2012	2 Years	2013, with a club option for 2014	

== Competitions ==
=== Preseason ===
Win Loss Tie

March 8, 2013 1	FIU Panthers	0–1	Fort Lauderdale Strikers	Miami, Florida
7:30 PM EDT			Santamaria 77'	Stadium: FIU Soccer Stadium

March 10, 2013 2	Copa Latina All-Stars	0–3	Fort Lauderdale Strikers	Hialeah, Florida
5:00 PM EDT			De Mujica 16'; Dimitrov 30'; Gonzalez 50' (pen.)	Stadium: Ted Hendricks Stadium

March 13, 2013 3	Florida Gulf Coast Eagles	0–1	Fort Lauderdale Strikers	Fort Myers, Florida
7:00 PM EDT			Johnson 63'	Stadium: FGCU Soccer Complex

March 16, 2013 4	Barry Buccaneers	0–5	Fort Lauderdale Strikers	Miami Shores, Florida
5:00 PM EDT			Dimitrov 21' 76'; Anderson 54' 75'; Jimenez 79'	Stadium: Buccaneer Field

March 20, 2013 5	Nova Southeastern Sharks	0–5	Fort Lauderdale Strikers	Davie, Florida
7:00 PM EDT			Dimitrov 16' 38' 65'; Foley 45'; Herron 73'	Stadium: NSU Soccer Complex

March 23, 2013 6	Florida Atlantic Owls	0–3	Fort Lauderdale Strikers	Boca Raton, Florida
7:00 PM EDT			King 15'; Salazar 21' 40'	Stadium: FAU Soccer Stadium

=== Friendlies ===
June 23, 2013 1	Fort Lauderdale Strikers (United States)	v	(Brazil) Cruzeiro	Fort Lauderdale, Florida
6:00 PM EDT				Stadium: Lockhart Stadium

=== NASL Spring Championship ===
The New York Cosmos and the Puerto Rico Islanders will not be participating in the spring season. The season will begin April 6 and end July 4, 2013.

=== Standings ===
Pos	Team	Pld	W	D	L	GF	GA	GD	Pts	Qualification
1	Atlanta Silverbacks (S)	12	6	3	3	20	15	+5	21	Soccer Bowl 2013
2	Carolina RailHawks	12	5	5	2	20	16	+4	20	
3	San Antonio Scorpions	12	6	2	4	19	15	+4	20	
4	Tampa Bay Rowdies	12	5	3	4	21	16	+5	18	
5	FC Edmonton	12	3	5	4	13	12	+1	14	
6	Minnesota United FC	12	4	2	6	18	23	−5	14	
7	Fort Lauderdale Strikers	12	2	2	8	10	24	−14	8	

Source: NASL Standings
Rules for classification: 1) points; 2) goal difference; 3) number of goals scored.
(S) Spring season champion

==== Results summary ====
Overall								Home						Away					
Pld	W	D	L	GF	GA	GD	Pts	W	D	L	GF	GA	GD	W	D	L	GF	GA	GD
10	2	2	6	9	16	−7	8	1	2	2	5	6	−1	1	0	4	4	10	−6

Source: Spring season 2013 results

==== Results by round ====
Round	1	2	3	4	5	6	7	8	9	10	11	12
Stadium	H	A	A	H	H	A	A	H	A	H	H	A
Result	T	L	L	L	W	L	W	T	L	L		
Position	2	6	7	7	6	7	6	7	7	7		

Updated to match(es) played on June 18, 2013. Source:
A = Away; H = Home; W = Win; L = Loss; T = Tie

==== Match results ====
Win Loss Tie

April 6, 2013 1	Fort Lauderdale Strikers	1–1	FC Edmonton	Fort Lauderdale, Florida
7:30 PM EDT	King (yellow card) 32'; Rubens (yellow card) 41'; Thomas (yellow card) 50'; Foley 74'; Salazar (yellow card) 81'		Knight (Saiko) 15'; Knight (yellow card) 38'; Rago (yellow card) 45'; Saiko (yellow card) 49'	Stadium: Lockhart Stadium; Attendance: 5,201; Referee: Mark Kadlecik

April 13, 2013 2	Atlanta Silverbacks	2–0	Fort Lauderdale Strikers	Atlanta
7:30 PM EDT	Barrera (yellow card) 35'; Carr (yellow card) 78'; Navarro (Moroney) 86'; Barrera (Blanco) 88'		Salazar (yellow card) 72'; Restrepo (yellow card) 72'	Stadium: Atlanta Silverbacks Park; Attendance: 5,402; Referee: Hayden Edwards

April 20, 2013 3	Carolina RailHawks	3–1	Fort Lauderdale Strikers	Cary, North Carolina
7:00 PM EDT	Franks (yellow card) 7'; Franks 27' (penalty); Shriver 35' (penalty); Millington (yellow card) 49'; Shriver 58'		Johnson (Pecka) 11'; Foley (yellow card) 26'; Johnson (yellow card) 65'; Restrepo (yellow card) 69'	Stadium: WakeMed Soccer Park; Attendance: 3,761; Referee: Danny Fitzgerald

April 27, 2013 4	Fort Lauderdale Strikers	1–2	Tampa Bay Rowdies	Fort Lauderdale, Florida
7:30 PM EDT	Foley (yellow card) 4'; Pecka (yellow card) 61'; Restrepo (King) 80'; Ståhl (yellow card) 84'		Frimpong (yellow card) 7'; Mulholland (Hristov) 43'; Mulholland (yellow card) 61'; Scott (yellow card) 68'; Dixon (Hristov) 78'	Stadium: Lockhart Stadium; Attendance: 4,563; Referee: Kevin Terry Jr.

May 11, 2013 5	Fort Lauderdale Strikers	2–1	Minnesota United FC	Fort Lauderdale, Florida
7:30 PM EDT	Anderson (Johnson) 2'; Foley (Gonzalez) 14'; Guillaume (red card) 58'; Dimitrov (yellow card) 89'		Altman (yellow card) 42'; Pablo Campos (Bracalello) 69'; Cristiano Dias (yellow card) 61'; Arguez (yellow card) 90'	Stadium: Lockhart Stadium; Attendance: 4,323; Referee: Cedric Adams

May 18, 2013 6	San Antonio Scorpions	3–1	Fort Lauderdale Strikers	San Antonio, Texas
8:30 PM EDT	Saavedra 1'; Phelan (yellow card) 38'; Vučko (Saavedra) 54'; Gordon (own goal) 58'; Vuolo (yellow card) 66'; Husić (yellow card) 80'		Gordon 55'; Thomas (yellow card) 47'; Guerrero (yellow card) 74'; Gonzalez (yellow card) 81'	Stadium: Toyota Field; Attendance: 6,889; Referee: Fotis Bazakos

May 26, 2013 7	FC Edmonton	0–1	Fort Lauderdale Strikers	Edmonton, Alberta, Canada
4:00 PM EDT	Parker (red card) 25'; Garrett (yellow card) 69'; Laing (yellow card) 81'; LeRoy (yellow card) 87'		Guillaume (yellow card) 58'; Salazar 69' (penalty); Salazar (yellow card) 89'	Stadium: Clarke Stadium; Attendance: 2,387; Referee: Sheena Dickson

June 1, 2013 8	Fort Lauderdale Strikers	1–1	Carolina RailHawks	Fort Lauderdale, Florida
7:30 PM EDT	Gordon (Gonzalez) 37'; King (yellow card) 55'; Salazar (red card) 59'; Gordon (yellow card) 60'; Pecka (yellow card) 90'		Ababio (yellow card) 24' da Luz (yellow card) 31'; Rutkiewicz (red card) 65'; Shriver (Shipalane) 81'; James (yellow card) 90'	Stadium: Lockhart Stadium; Attendance: 4,047; Referee: Sorin Stoica

June 8, 2013 9	Minnesota United FC	2–1	Fort Lauderdale Strikers	Minneapolis, Minnesota
8:30 PM EDT	Pablo Campos (pen) 55'; Pablo Campos (Bracalello) 90+'		King 9'; Gordon (yellow card) 27'; Ramos (yellow card) 28'; Ståhl (yellow card) 63'	Stadium: Hubert H. Humphrey Metrodome

June 15, 2013 10	Fort Lauderdale Strikers	0–1	Atlanta Silverbacks	Fort Lauderdale, Florida
7:30 PM EDT	Guillaume (yellow card) 59'; Restrepo (yellow card) 90'; Hassan (yellow card) 90'		Lancaster (yellow card) 19'; Barrera (red card) 63'; Menjivar (pen) 90+'	Stadium: Lockhart Stadium; Attendance: 4,463; Referee: Jesus Cisneros

June 29, 2013 11	Fort Lauderdale Strikers	v	San Antonio Scorpions	Fort Lauderdale, Florida
7:30 PM EDT				Stadium: Lockhart Stadium

July 4, 2013 12	Tampa Bay Rowdies	v	Fort Lauderdale Strikers	St. Petersburg, Florida
6:30 PM EDT				Stadium: Al Lang Stadium

=== U.S. Open Cup ===
May 21, 2013 Second round	Fort Lauderdale Strikers (Florida)	1–1 (a.e.t.) (7–6 p)	(Texas) Laredo Heat	Fort Lauderdale, Florida
7:30 PM EDT	Thomas (yellow card) 23'; Restrepo (yellow card) 40'; Anderson (King) 54'; Pecka (yellow card) 96'		Barbosa (red card) 66'; Frias (yellow card) 67'; Hernandez (yellow card) 78'; Botero (Hernandez) 83'	Stadium: Lockhart Stadium; Referee: Andres Pfefferkorn
	Penalties
	De Mujica (penalty scored); Anderson (penalty scored); Gonzalez (penalty scored); Ramos (penalty scored); Dimitrov (penalty scored); King (penalty scored); Guillaume (penalty missed); Ståhl (penalty scored)		(penalty scored) De Dios Ibarra; (penalty scored) Kocic; (penalty scored) Taylor; (penalty scored) De Armas; (penalty scored) Botero; (penalty scored) Navarro; (penalty missed) Hernandez; (penalty missed) Mulamba

May 28, 2013 Third round	Fort Lauderdale Strikers (Florida)	0–2	(Texas) FC Dallas	Fort Lauderdale, Florida
7:30 PM EDT		Summary	Blas Pérez 54'; Hedges 66'	Stadium: Lockhart Stadium

== Squad statistics ==
=== NASL Spring Championship ===
==== Players ====
Nat	No	Player	Pos	Apps	Starts	G	A	Booked	Sent off (straight red)	Notes
(United States)	2	Stefan Antonijevic	CB	3	2	0	0	0	0	
(Colombia)	3	Daniel Arcila	LB	3	3	0	0	0	0	
(Finland)	5	Toni Ståhl	CB	9	8	0	1	2	0	
(United States)	6	Hosman Ramos	AM	3	2	0	0	1	0	
(England)	7	David Foley	LW	5	5	2	0	2	0	Sent to blood bin
(Brazil)	8	Pecka	DM	7	7	0	1	2	0	
(England)	9	Jemal Johnson	RW	9	8	1	1	1	0	
(United States)	10	Wálter Restrepo	AM	8	4	1	0	3	0	
(Bulgaria)	11	Stefan Dimitrov	ST	7	6	0	0	1	0	
(United States)	11	Jahbari Willis	ST	1	0	0	0	0	0	
(Honduras)	12	Iván Guerrero	LB	6	6	0	0	1	0	
(United States)	13	Justin Chavez	CB	4	3	0	0	0	0	
(Colombia)	14	Carlos Salazar	AM	8	6	1	0	3	1	
(United States)	15	Scott Gordon	FB	6	6	2	0	2	0	Sent to blood bin
(United States)	16	Mike Dietze	DM	0	0	0	0	0	0	
(Puerto Rico)	17	Eduardo Jiménez	AM	0	0	0	0	0	0	
(Haiti)	18	Stéphane Guillaume	RB	4	4	0	0	2	1	
(Argentina)	19	Gonzalo De Mujica	AM	3	1	0	0	0	0	
(England)	20	Mark Anderson	AM	5	4	1	0	0	0	Sent to blood bin
(United States)	21	Darnell King	RW	10	8	1	1	2	0	
(United States)	23	Manny Gonzalez	DM	6	6	0	2	1	0	
(Brazil)	25	Rubens	DM	5	3	0	0	1	0	
(Costa Rica)	26	Andy Herron	ST	3	0	0	0	0	0	
(Jamaica)	44	Shavar Thomas	CB	8	8	0	0	2	0	
(United States)	99	Aly Hassan	ST	5	0	0	0	1	0	
						9	6	27	2	

Last updated: June 18, 2013.

==== Goalkeepers ====
Nat	No	Player	Apps	Starts	Record	GA	GAA	SO
(United States)	1	Cody Laurendi	1	1	0-0-0	0	0	0
(United States)	22	Lionel Brown	0	0	0-0-0	0	0	0
(United States)	24	Matt Glaeser	6	5	0-1-5	11	1.83	0
(United States)	30	Jeff Attinella	4	4	2-1-1	5	1.25	1
			11	10	2-2-6	16	1.60	1

Last updated: June 18, 2013.

=== Top scorers ===
Includes all competitive matches. The list is sorted by shirt number when total goals are equal.

Ran	No.	Pos	Nat	Name	NASL	U.S. Open Cup	Total
1	7	FW	(England)	David Foley	2	0	2
1	15	DF	(United States)	Scott Gordon	2	0	2
1	20	MF	(England)	Mark Anderson	1	1	2
2	9	FW	(England)	Jemal Johnson	1	0	1
2	10	MF	(United States)	Walter Restrepo	1	0	1
2	14	MF	(Colombia)	Carlos Salazar	1	0	1
2	21	MF	(United States)	Darnell King	1	0	1
				TOTALS	9	1	10

Last updated: June 11, 2013

=== Top assists ===
Includes all competitive matches. The list is sorted by shirt number when total assists are equal.

Ran	No.	Pos	Nat	Name	NASL	U.S. Open Cup	Total
1	21	DF	(United States)	Darnell King	1	1	2
1	23	MF	(United States)	Manny Gonzalez	2	0	2
2	5	DF	(Finland)	Toni Ståhl	1	0	1
2	8	MF	(Brazil)	Pecka	1	0	1
2	9	FW	(England)	Jemal Johnson	1	0	1
				TOTALS	6	1	7

Last updated: June 4, 2013

=== Starting XI ===
This shows the most used players in each position, based on the Striker's typical starting formation for the season.

No.	Pos.	Nat.	Name	MS	Notes
24	GK	(United States)	Glaeser	7	Attinella has 4 starts, Laurendi has 1 start
18	RB	(Haiti)	Guillaume	6	
44	CB	(Jamaica)	Thomas	10	Justin Chavez has 3 starts, Stefan Antonijevic has 2 starts
5	CB	(Finland)	Ståhl	10	Gordon has 7 starts
12	LB	(Honduras)	Guerrero	8	Daniel Arcila has 3 starts
23	DM	(United States)	Gonzalez	8	
8	DM	(Brazil)	Pecka	9	Rubens has 3 starts
10	RW	(United States)	Restrepo	6	Hosman Ramos has 2 starts
14	AM	(Colombia)	Salazar	8	Mark Anderson has 5 starts
9	LW	(England)	Johnson	8	Foley has 5 starts, Gonzalo De Mujica has 1 start
21	CF	(United States)	King	10	Dimitrov had 6 starts

Last updated: June 11, 2013
Source: Squad stats and Start formations.
Only competitive matches.
Using the most used start formation.
Ordered by position on pitch (from back right to front left).

== Club staff ==
Position	Name
President	(United States) Tom Mulroy
Managing Director	(United States) Tim Robbie
Director of Operations	(United States) Miguel Lopez
Head coach	(United States) Daryl Shore
Assistant coach	(Germany) Raoul Voss
Goalkeepers Coach	(Brazil) Ricardo Lopes
Head Athletic Trainer	(United States) Joe Caroccio

Updated to match played June 22, 2012

== Recognition ==
Team of the Week Week 1: David Foley, Pecka, Toni Ståhl
Week 4: Walter Restrepo
Week 5: Jeff Attinella, Shavar Thomas, Manny Gonzalez, Jemal Johnson
