= 2013 Tampa Bay Rowdies season =

Tampa Bay Rowdies
2013 season
- Owners: Andrew Nestor
- Head coach: Ricky Hill
- Stadium: Al Lang Field
- NASL: Spring: 4th Fall: 3rd
- NASL Playoffs: did not qualify
- U.S. Open Cup: Fourth Round
- Coastal Cup: Winners
- Walt Disney World Classic: 8th
- Top goalscorer: League: Georgi Hristov (12); All: Georgi Hristov (15)
- Highest home attendance: 7,032 (August 10 v. New York)
- Lowest home attendance: 3,118 (August 24 v. Edmonton)
Home colors	Away colors	Third colors

The 2013 season was the current Tampa Bay Rowdies fourth season of existence, and third playing in the North American Soccer League, the second tier of American soccer pyramid. Including the original Rowdies franchise and the Tampa Bay Mutiny, this was the 26th season of a professional soccer team fielded in the Tampa Bay region.

The Rowdies entered the 2013 season as the defending NASL Champions.

== Background ==
The 2012 season marked one of the most successful seasons in modern Rowdies history, as the club finished second in the league table during the regular season. During the regular season, Tampa Bay amassed 45 points in 28 matches, and tallied for 12 wins, nine draws and seven losses. By finishing in the upper two spots of the league table, Tampa Bay earned a bye to the semifinals of the 2012 NASL Playoffs, where they took on Carolina RailHawks in the two-leg semifinal series. Ultimately, the Rowdies defeated the RailHawks 5–4 on aggregate, earning themselves a berth into the Championship round. There, Tampa Bay took on the Minnesota Stars FC, and had the luxury of hosting the second leg, due to the better season record. Tampa Bay fell 2–0 in the first leg of the series, but were able to recover in the second leg of the series, winning the match 3–1 and tying the match on aggregate. The aggregate tie allowed the match to enter a penalty shoot-out, in which Tampa Bay emerged victorious, 3–2, over Minnesota.

== Club ==
=== Roster ===
No.	Position	Nation	Player
1	GK	USA	Andrew Fontein
2	DF	USA	Daniel Scott
3	DF	CAN	Andres Arango
4	MF	SCO	Stuart Campbell
5	DF	USA	Kyle Clinton
7	DF	USA	Frank Sanfilippo (captain)
8	MF	ENG	Luke Mulholland
9	MF	USA	Raphael Cox
10	FW	BUL	Georgi Hristov
11	MF	ENG	Shane Hill
13	DF	USA	Thurstan Johnson
14	DF	USA	Draymond Washington
16	FW	JAM	Amani Walker
17	DF	USA	Jordan Gafa
18	DF	USA	Jay Needham
20	FW	GHA	Evans Frimpong
21	FW	USA	Devin Del Do
22	MF	USA	Keith Savage
24	GK	USA	Diego Restrepo
25	FW	GUY	Carl Cort
27	MF	USA	Jamael Cox
32	DF	JPN	Takuya Yamada
99	FW	MLT	Etienne Barbara

=== Team management ===
- (United States) Perry Van der Beck – Executive Vice President, Technical Director, and Director of Player Development
- (United States) Lee Cohen – Director of Operations
- (England) Ricky Hill – Head Coach
- (Bosnia and Herzegovina) Slobodan Janjuš – Goalkeeper Coach
- (United States) James Faylo – Head Athletic Trainer
- (United States) Patrick Horan – Team Physician

== Competitions ==
Win Tie Loss

=== Preseason ===
==== Friendlies ====
March 2, 2013 Preseason	South Florida Bulls	0–1	Tampa Bay Rowdies	Tampa, Florida
7:30 p.m. EDT		Report	Johnson 20'	Stadium: Corbett Soccer Stadium

March 13, 2013 Preseason	Eckerd Tritons	0–5	Tampa Bay Rowdies	St. Petersburg, Florida
7:30 p.m. EDT		Report	Mulholland 5'; Walker 35', 60'; Hristov 42'; Hill 72'	Stadium: Eckerd College Soccer Field

March 19, 2013 Preseason	Tampa Spartans	1–3	Tampa Bay Rowdies	Tampa, Florida
7:30 p.m. EDT	Laird 14'	Report	Savage 11'; Hill 40'; Hristov 43'	Stadium: Pepin Stadium

March 23, 2013 Preseason	Saint Leo Lions	1–2	Tampa Bay Rowdies	New Port Richey, Florida
7:30 p.m. EDT	Davis (yellow card) 29'; Davis 70'	Report	Mulholland 12'; Mulholland (yellow card) 18'; Del Do 49'	Stadium: Mitchell Fields

==== I-4 Derby ====
March 9, 2013
7:30 p.m. EDT
1st leg

Orlando City	3–2	Tampa Bay Rowdies
Watson 49'; O'Connor 58'; Alexandre 70'	Report	Walker 17'; Mulholland 75'

Citrus Bowl, Orlando, Florida
Attendance: 6,877
March 30, 2013
7:30 p.m. EDT
2nd leg

Tampa Bay Rowdies	2–3	Orlando City
Mulholland (yellow card) 36'; Yamada 42' (pen.); Walker 51'	Report	Molino 5'; Mbengue 33'; O'Connor (yellow card) 59'; Dwyer 90'

Al Lang Field, St. Petersburg, Florida

Orlando City won 6–4 on aggregate and won the I-4 Derby.

==== Walt Disney World Pro Soccer Classic ====
Group stage

Team	Pld	W	L	D	GF	GA	GD	Pts
Montreal Impact	3	2	0	1	7	3	+4	7
Sporting Kansas City	3	2	1	0	4	2	+2	6
D.C. United	3	1	1	1	5	3	+2	4
Tampa Bay Rowdies	3	0	3	0	1	9	−8	0

February 9, 2013 1	D.C. United	4–0	Tampa Bay Rowdies	Lake Buena Vista, Florida
8:00 p.m. EDT	Pajoy 55', 59'; Kemp 66', 73'	Report		Stadium: Hess Field

February 13, 2013 2	Tampa Bay Rowdies	1–4	Montreal Impact	Lake Buena Vista, Florida
3:00 p.m. EDT	Yamada 38' (pen.)	Report	Felipe 2'; Di Vaio 17' (pen.), 42'; Nyassi 66'	Stadium: Hess Field

February 16, 2013 3	Tampa Bay Rowdies	0–1	Sporting Kansas City	Lake Buena Vista, Florida
8:00 p.m. EDT		Report	Zusi 76'	Stadium: Hess Field

February 23, 2013 7th place match	Orlando City	2–0	Tampa Bay Rowdies	Lake Buena Vista, Florida
6:00 p.m. EDT	Watson 1' (pen.); Chin 75'	Report		Stadium: Hess Field

=== NASL Spring season ===
==== Standings ====
Pos	Team	Pld	W	D	L	GF	GA	GD	Pts	Qualification
1	Atlanta Silverbacks (S)	12	6	3	3	20	15	+5	21	Soccer Bowl 2013
2	Carolina RailHawks	12	5	5	2	20	16	+4	20	
3	San Antonio Scorpions	12	6	2	4	19	15	+4	20	
4	Tampa Bay Rowdies	12	5	3	4	21	16	+5	18	
5	FC Edmonton	12	3	5	4	13	12	+1	14	
6	Minnesota United FC	12	4	2	6	18	23	−5	14	
7	Fort Lauderdale Strikers	12	2	2	8	10	24	−14	8	

Source: NASL Standings
Rules for classification: 1) points; 2) goal difference; 3) number of goals scored.
(S) Spring season champion

==== Results summary ====
Overall								Home						Away					
Pld	W	D	L	GF	GA	GD	Pts	W	D	L	GF	GA	GD	W	D	L	GF	GA	GD
12	5	3	4	21	15	+6	18	1	2	3	11	10	+1	4	1	1	10	5	+5

Last updated: July 4, 2013.
Source: Match reports

==== Results by round ====
Round	1	2	3	4	5	6	7	8	9	10	11	12
Stadium	H	A	H	A	H	A	H	A	A	H	A	H
Result	D	W	L	W	D	W	L	D	L	L	W	W

Updated to match(es) played on July 4, 2013. Source: Match reports
A = Away; H = Home; W = Win; D = Draw; L = Loss

==== Match reports ====
April 6, 2013 Match 1	Tampa Bay Rowdies	0–0	Carolina RailHawks	St. Petersburg, Florida
7:30 p.m. EDT	Mulholland (yellow card) 77'; Cox (yellow card) 80'	Report	da Luz (yellow card) 77'; Hamilton (yellow card) 80' (yellow-red card) 90'	Stadium: Al Lang Stadium; Attendance: 4,232; Referee: (United States) Juan Carlos Rivero

April 13, 2013 Match 2	San Antonio Scorpions	0–2	Tampa Bay Rowdies	San Antonio, Texas
7:30 p.m. EDT	Hannigan (yellow card) 55'; Phelan (yellow card) 83'	Report	Walker 12'; Hristov 56' (pen.); Needham (yellow card) 61'	Stadium: Toyota Field; Attendance: 8,177; Referee: (United States) Matthew Foerster

April 20, 2013 Match 3	Tampa Bay Rowdies	3–4	Atlanta Silverbacks	St. Petersburg, Florida
7:30 p.m. EDT	Frimpong 9'; Mulholland 24', 44'; Cox (yellow card) 80'	Report	Luna 22', 63'; Pedro Mendes (yellow card) 45' (goal) 53', 70'; James (yellow card) 60'; Willis (red card) 90'	Stadium: Al Lang Stadium; Attendance: 3,575; Referee: (United States) Marcos de Oliveira

April 27, 2013 Match 4	Fort Lauderdale Strikers	1–2	Tampa Bay Rowdies	Fort Lauderdale, Florida
7:30 p.m. EDT	Foley (yellow card) 4'; Pecka (yellow card) 61'; Scott (yellow card) 67'; Restrepo 80'	Report	Frimpong (yellow card) 7'; Mulholland 42' (yellow card) 61'; Dixon 78'	Stadium: Lockhart Stadium; Attendance: 4,563; Referee: (United States) Kevin Terry

May 4, 2013 Match 5	Tampa Bay Rowdies	1–1	FC Edmonton	St. Petersburg, Florida
7:30 p.m. EDT	Hristov 16' (pen.); Cox (yellow card) 53'	Report	Saiko 35'; Nurse (yellow card) 67'; Cox (yellow card) 77'	Stadium: Al Lang Stadium; Attendance: 3,412; Referee: (United States) Ted Unkel

May 18, 2013 Match 6	Minnesota United FC	2–3	Tampa Bay Rowdies	Minneapolis, Minnesota
3:30 p.m. EDT	Reed 54'; Bracalello 65'	Report	Hill 45+'; Mulholland 55'; Savage 90'; Scott (yellow card) 90'	Stadium: Hubert H. Humphrey Metrodome; Attendance: 4,053; Referee: (Canada) Geoff Gamble

May 25, 2013 Match 7	Tampa Bay Rowdies	2–3	Minnesota United FC	St. Petersburg, Florida
7:30 p.m. EDT	Arango (yellow card) 12'; Hristov 14', 29'; Scott (yellow card) 45+'; Mulholland (yellow card) 45+'; Cox (yellow card) 55'	Report	Dias 10'; Moura 23' (yellow card) 77'; Bracalello 26'; Arguez (yellow card) 55'; Takada (yellow card) 57'	Stadium: Al Lang Stadium; Attendance: 3,372; Referee: (United States) Younes Marrakchi

June 2, 2013 Match 8	FC Edmonton	0–0	Tampa Bay Rowdies	Edmonton, Alberta
4:00 p.m. EDT	Roberts (yellow card) 40' (yellow-red card) 53'; Hlavaty (yellow card) 77'	Report	Arango (yellow card) 82'	Stadium: Clarke Stadium; Attendance: 2,190; Referee: (Canada) Alain Ruch

June 8, 2013 Match 9	Carolina RailHawks	2–1	Tampa Bay Rowdies	Cary, North Carolina
7:00 p.m. EDT	César Elizondo 90+2' (yellow card) 90+2'; Shipalane 90+5'; Beckford (red card) (postgame)	Report	Ambersley (yellow card) 32'; Arango (red card) 37'; Del Do 87'; Restrepo (yellow card) 90+2'; Hill (red card) (postgame)	Stadium: WakeMed Soccer Park; Attendance: 4,086; Referee: (United States) Daniel Radford

June 15, 2013 Match 10	Tampa Bay Rowdies	1–2	San Antonio Scorpions	St. Petersburg, Florida
7:30 p.m. EDT	Mulholland (yellow card) 72'; Cort 80'	Report	Vučko (yellow card) 8'; Wagner 37'; Zavaleta (yellow card) 51'; Harmse (yellow card) 63'; Phelan (yellow card) 79'; Janicki (yellow card) 82'; Denissen 88'	Stadium: Al Lang Stadium; Attendance: 4,595; Referee: (United States) Alejandro Mariscal

June 22, 2013 Match 11	Atlanta Silverbacks	1–2	Tampa Bay Rowdies	Atlanta, Georgia
7:30 p.m. EDT	Ferreira-Mendes (yellow card) 37'; Menjivar (yellow card) 58'; Cruz 62'; Blanco (yellow card) 69'	Report	Hristov 50' (pen.) (yellow card) 69'; Ambersley 59' (pen.); Gafa (yellow card) 67'; Cort (red card) 90+2'	Stadium: Atlanta Silverbacks Park; Attendance: 5,711; Referee: (United States) Fotis Bazakos

July 4, 2013 Match 12	Tampa Bay Rowdies	4–0	Fort Lauderdale Strikers	St. Petersburg, Florida
6:30 p.m. EDT	Savage 20', 32'; Needham 52' (yellow card) 54'; Ambersley 56'	Report	Ståhl (yellow card) 30'; Rubens (yellow card) 31'; Gonzalez (yellow card) 67'	Stadium: Al Lang Stadium; Attendance: 5,034; Referee: (United States) Ted Unkel

=== NASL Fall season ===
==== Standings ====
Pos	Team	Pld	W	D	L	GF	GA	GD	Pts	Qualification
1	New York Cosmos (F)	14	9	4	1	22	12	+10	31	Soccer Bowl 2013
2	Carolina RailHawks	14	7	2	5	21	16	+5	23	
3	Tampa Bay Rowdies	14	5	5	4	30	27	+3	20	
4	Minnesota United FC	14	6	2	6	21	19	+2	20	
5	Fort Lauderdale Strikers	14	5	3	6	18	20	−2	18	
6	FC Edmonton	14	3	7	4	13	14	−1	16	
7	Atlanta Silverbacks	14	4	4	6	14	22	−8	16	
8	San Antonio Scorpions	14	3	1	10	15	24	−9	10	

Source: NASL Standings
Rules for classification: 1) points; 2) goal difference; 3) number of goals scored.
(F) Fall season champion

==== Results summary ====
Overall								Home						Away					
Pld	W	D	L	GF	GA	GD	Pts	W	D	L	GF	GA	GD	W	D	L	GF	GA	GD
14	5	5	4	30	27	+3	20	4	2	1	14	11	+3	1	3	3	16	16	0

Last updated: April 26, 2018.
Source: Match reports

==== Results by round ====
Round	1	2	3	4	5	6	7	8	9	10	11	12	13	14
Stadium	A	H	A	H	A	H	A	H	A	A	H	H	A	H
Result	W	D	D	D	D	W	D	W	L	L	W	W	L	L

Updated to match(es) played on September 14, 2013. Source: Match reports
A = Away; H = Home; W = Win; D = Draw; L = Loss

==== Match reports ====
August 3, 2013 Match 1	San Antonio Scorpions	4–7	Tampa Bay Rowdies	San Antonio, Texas
8:00 p.m. EDT	Denissen 3', 16'; Zahorski 18', 79'; Janicki (yellow card) 88'	Report	Mulholland 25'; Savage 32'; Frimpong 42'; Walker 45+3'; Hristov 67', 90+2' (pen.); Barbara (yellow card) 66' (goal) 85'	Stadium: Toyota Field; Attendance: 7,651; Referee: (United States) Jair Marrufo

August 10, 2013 Match 2	Tampa Bay Rowdies	0–0	New York Cosmos	St. Petersburg, Florida
7:30 EDT	Hristov (yellow card) 41'; Mulholland (yellow card) 37' (yellow-red card) 90+3'	Report	Veeder (yellow card) 28'; Noselli (yellow card) 70'	Stadium: Al Lang Stadium; Attendance: 7,032; Referee: (United States) Sorin Stoica

August 17, 2013 Match 3	Minnesota United FC	1–1	Tampa Bay Rowdies	Blaine, Minnesota
8:00 p.m. EDT	Campos 17'; Bracalello (yellow card) 29'	Report	Frimpong (yellow card) 68'; Del Do (yellow card) 90+1'; Arango 90+4'	Stadium: National Sports Center; Attendance: 5,634; Referee: (United States) Daniel Radford

August 24, 2013 Match 4	Tampa Bay Rowdies	1–1	FC Edmonton	St. Petersburg, Florida
7:30 p.m. EDT	Mulholland 38'; Needham (yellow card) 46'	Report	Nurse (yellow card) 13' (goal) 45+1'; Cox (yellow card) 55'; Hlavaty (yellow card) 90+5'	Stadium: Al Lang Stadium; Attendance: 3,118; Referee: (United States) Fotis Bazakos

August 31, 2013 Match 5	Atlanta Silverbacks	1–1	Tampa Bay Rowdies	Atlanta, Georgia
7:30 p.m. EDT	Ferreira-Mendes 4'; Lancaster (yellow card) 47'	Report	Hristov 50' (pen.) (yellow card) 61'	Stadium: Atlanta Silverbacks Park; Attendance: 3,202; Referee: (United States) Kevin Terry Jr.

September 7, 2013 Match 6	Tampa Bay Rowdies	3–2	Carolina RailHawks	St. Petersburg, Florida
7:30 p.m. EDT	Frimpong 42'; Hristov 60'; Mulholland (yellow card) 72'; Mkosana 90+2' (yellow card) 90+2'; Barbara (yellow card) 90+2'	Report	Shipalane 34'; Martínez 64'	Stadium: Al Lang Stadium; Attendance: 3,227; Referee: (United States) Jorge González

September 14, 2013 Match 7	Carolina RailHawks	2–2	Tampa Bay Rowdies	Cary, North Carolina
7:00 p.m. EDT	Shipalane 30' da Luz 90'	Report	Frimpong 72'; Needham 74'; Hill (yellow card) 90+1'	Stadium: WakeMed Soccer Park; Attendance: 4,753; Referee: (United States) Tyler Ploeger

September 21, 2013 Match 8	Tampa Bay Rowdies	3–1	Atlanta Silverbacks	St. Petersburg, Florida
7:30 p.m. EDT	Gafa (yellow card) 45'; Hristov 54', 57'; Hill 65'	Report	Moroney (yellow card) 61'; James 75'	Stadium: Al Lang Stadium; Attendance: 3,571; Referee: (United States) Robert Sibiga

September 29, 2013 Match 9	New York Cosmos	4–3	Tampa Bay Rowdies	Hempstead, New York
7:00 p.m. EDT	Marošević 23'; Paulo 63'; Díaz 80' (yellow card) 80'; Senna 82'; Ayoze (yellow card) 88'	Report	Mulholland 20' (yellow card) 87'; Hristov 34'; Mkosana 45+1'	Stadium: Shuart Stadium; Attendance: 6,518; Referee: (Canada) Geoff Gamble

October 5, 2013 Match 10	Fort Lauderdale Strikers	2–1	Tampa Bay Rowdies	Fort Lauderdale, Florida
7:30 p.m. EDT	Nuñez 22'; Salazar (yellow card) 69'; Baladez 84'	Report	Cort 94'	Stadium: Lockhart Stadium; Attendance: 3,612; Referee: Margaret Domka

October 12, 2013 Match 11	Tampa Bay Rowdies	2–1	Fort Lauderdale Strikers	St. Petersburg, Florida
7:30 p.m. EDT	Mkosana 14' (yellow card) 68'; Campbell (yellow card) 22'; Cox (yellow card) 72'; Mulholland 76' (pen.); D. Restrepo (yellow card) 82'	Report	Nuñez 38'; W. Restrepo (yellow card) 42'; Guerrero (yellow card) 45'; Pecka (yellow card) 64'	Stadium: Al Lang Stadium; Attendance: 3,854; Referee: (United States) Daniel Radford

October 19, 2013 Match 12	Tampa Bay Rowdies	1–0	San Antonio Scorpions	St. Petersburg, Florida
7:30 p.m. EDT	Mulholland 76' (pen.)	Report	Ramírez (yellow card) 85'	Stadium: Al Lang Stadium; Attendance: 3,237; Referee: (United States) Kevin Terry Jr.

October 27, 2013 Match 13	FC Edmonton	2–1	Tampa Bay Rowdies	Edmonton, Alberta, Canada
4:00 p.m. EDT	Fordyce 34'; Garrett 36' (yellow card) 57'; Edward (yellow card) 86'; Hertzog (yellow card) 90'	Report	Mulholland 48'	Stadium: Clarke Stadium; Attendance: 4,061; Referee: Francis LaTulippe

November 2, 2013 Match 14	Tampa Bay Rowdies	4–6	Minnesota United	St. Petersburg
7:30 p.m. EDT	Cort (yellow card) 33'; Mulholland 52' (pen.), (yellow card) 58'; Pitchkolan 65' (o.g.); Frimpong 85', 90'	Report	Franks 10'; Daley 17', 60', 83'; Campos 71', 90' (pen.), (yellow card) 90'	Stadium: Al Lang Stadium; Attendance: 4,319; Referee: Ted Unkel

=== U.S. Open Cup ===
May 21, 2013 Second round	VSI Tampa Bay FC (Florida)	1–2	(Florida) Tampa Bay Rowdies	Plant City, Florida
7:30 p.m. EDT	Hoffer (yellow card) 20'; Noone 27'; Freitas (yellow card) 65'	Report 1 Report 2	Arango (yellow card) 16'; Hristov 21' (pen.), 43'	Stadium: Plant City Stadium; Referee: (United States) Jonathan Weiner

May 29, 2013 Third round	Tampa Bay Rowdies (Florida)	1–0	(Washington (state)) Seattle Sounders FC	St. Petersburg, Florida
7:30 p.m. EDT	Hristov 75'; Gafa (red card) 84'	Report	Caskey (yellow card) 52'; Martínez (yellow card) 90'	Stadium: Al Lang Stadium; Attendance: 4,124; Referee: (United States) Cedric Adams

June 12, 2013 Fourth round	Portland Timbers (Oregon)	2–0	(Florida) Tampa Bay Rowdies	Portland, Oregon
10:30 p.m. EDT	Nanchoff 9'; Jewsbury 55'	Report	Hristov (yellow card) 43' (yellow-red card) 89'; Needham (yellow card) 45'	Stadium: JELD-WEN Field; Attendance: 5,931; Referee: (United States) Ismail Elfath

== Honors ==
=== Individual honors ===
- NASL Golden Ball Award (MVP)

Georgi Hristov

- NASL Best XI

Luke Mulholland, Georgi Hristov

== Transfers ==
=== In ===
No.	Pos.	Player	Transferred from	Fee/notes	Date	Source
20	FW	(Ghana) Evans Frimpong	(United States) Tampa Bay Rowdies	Re-signed to a 2-year deal with the club	November 28, 2012	
22	MF	(United States) Keith Savage	(United States) Tampa Bay Rowdies	Re-signed to a 3-year deal with the club through the 2015 season	November 28, 2012	
14	DF	(United States) Draymond Washington	(United States) Tampa Bay Rowdies	Re-signed to a 2-year deal with the club	November 28, 2012	
33	DF	(United States) Jay Needham	Puerto Rico Islanders	Signed to a 3-year deal with the club through the 2015 season	January 7, 2013	
3	DF	(Canada) Andres Arango	(United States) Tampa Bay Rowdies	Re-signed to a 1-year deal with the club, with an option for the 2014 season	January 14, 2013	
32	DF	(Japan) Takuya Yamada	(United States) Tampa Bay Rowdies	Re-signed to a 1-year deal	January 18, 2013	
16	FW	(Jamaica) Amani Walker	(United States) Minnesota United FC	Signed to a 2-year deal with the club through the 2014 season	February 20, 2013	
10	FW	(Bulgaria) Georgi Hristov	(Bulgaria) PFC Lokomotiv Sofia	Signed to a 2-year deal with the club, with an option for the 2014 season	March 8, 2013	
21	FW	(United States) Devin Del Do	(United States) Minnesota United FC	Signed to a 2-year deal with the club, with an option for the 2014 season	March 13, 2013	
24	GK	(United States) Diego Restrepo	(Venezuela) Deportivo Táchira	Signed to a 2-year deal with the club, with an option for the 2014 season	March 20, 2013	
5	MF	(United States) Kyle Clinton	(United States) GPS Portland Phoenix	Signed to a 2-year deal with the club, with an option for the 2014 season	March 27, 2013	
17	DF	(United States) Jordan Gafa	(United States) North Carolina Tar Heels	Signed to a 2-year deal with the club, with an option for the 2014 season	March 27, 2013	
13	DF	(United States) Thurston Johnson	(United States) Tampa Bay Rowdies	Signed to a 2-year deal with the club, with an option for the 2014 season	April 10, 2013	
27	MF	(United States) Jamael Cox	(United States) Seattle Sounders U-23	Signed to a 2-year deal with the club, with an option for the 2014 season	June 4, 2013	
99	FW	(Malta) Etienne Barbara	(United States) Minnesota United FC	Trade for Mike Ambersley	August 1, 2013	

=== Out ===
No.	Pos.	Player	Transferred to	Fee/notes	Date	Source
	DF	(United States) Eddie Ababio	None	Club declined contract option	November 20, 2012	
	FW	(United States) Dan Antoniuk	None	Free Agent	November 20, 2012	
	GK	(United States) Jeff Attinella	(United States) Real Salt Lake	Club declined contract option; signed with Real Salt Lake	November 20, 2012	
	FW	(United States) Matt Clare	None	Club declined contract option	November 20, 2012	
	DF	(United States) Thurstan Johnson	None	Free Agent	November 20, 2012	
	MF	(United States) Dan O'Brien	None	Club declined contract option	November 20, 2012	
	DF	(Guyana) J. P. Rodrigues	None	Club declined contract option	November 20, 2012	
	FW	(United States) Fafa Picault	None	Club declined contract option	November 28, 2012	
	FW	(United States) Mike Ambersley	Minnesota United FC	Trade for Etienne Barbara	August 1, 2013	

=== Loan in ===
No.	Pos.	Player	Loaned from	Start	End	Source
23	MF	(United States) Alex Dixon	(United States) Houston Dynamo	April 5, 2013	30 day loan with the option for an extension	

=== Loan out ===
No.	Pos.	Player	Loaned to	Start	End	Source
