= 2014 New York Cosmos season =

New York Cosmos
2014 season
- Chairman: Seamus O'Brien
- Head Coach: Giovanni Savarese
- Stadium: Shuart Stadium; Belson Stadium (US Open Cup)
- NASL: Spring: 2nd Place Fall: 6th Place Combined: 3rd Place
- Soccer Bowl: Did not qualify
- U.S. Open Cup: 5th round
- Top goalscorer: League: Mads Stokkelien & Sebastián Guenzatti (3); All: Mads Stokkelien (5)
- Highest home attendance: League: 7,906 (April 13 v. Atlanta); All: 9,364 (June 14 v. Red Bulls)
- Lowest home attendance: League: 3,091 (May 12 v. Minnesota); All: 1,851 (May 28 v. Brooklyn at Belson Stadium)
- Average home league attendance: League: 4,835; All: 5,028
Home colors	Away colors

The 2014 New York Cosmos season was the new Cosmos' second season of existence, playing in the new North American Soccer League. Including the previous franchise, it was the sixteenth season of a club entitled New York Cosmos playing professional soccer in the New York metropolitan area.

== Club ==
=== Roster ===
As of July 19, 2014.

No.	Position	Nation	Player
1	GK	USA	Jimmy Maurer
2	DF	USA	Hunter Freeman
3	DF	USA	Hunter Gorskie
4	DF	USA	Carlos Mendes (Captain)
5	MF	CMR	Joseph Nane
6	DF	BRA	Rovérsio
7	MF	ESP	Ayoze
8	MF	VEN	Diomar Díaz
11	FW	USA	Peri Marošević
12	GK	USA	Kyle Zobeck
13	MF	URU	Sebastián Guenzatti
14	MF	USA	Danny Szetela
15	DF	USA	Jimmy Ockford (on loan from Seattle Sounders FC)
16	MF	USA	Dane Murphy
17	FW	BUL	Stefan Dimitrov
18	FW	NOR	Mads Stokkelien
19	MF	ESP	Marcos Senna
20	FW	NED	Hans Denissen
21	FW	COL	David Diosa
22	FW	ITA	Alessandro Noselli
25	MF	USA	Hagop Chirishian
27	FW	USA	Jemal Johnson
28	MF	USA	Jimmy Mulligan
30	MF	BRA	Paulo Ferreira-Mendes
33	DF	USA	Jimmy Nealis
11	FW	ESA	Andrés Flores

== Competitions ==
=== Pre-season and Exhibitions ===
==== Pre-season ====
March 6, 2014 Friendly	Al Shabab Al Arabi Club	1–0	New York Cosmos	Dubai, UAE
08:30 EST UTC−5	Edgar 38'	Report		Stadium: Maktoum Bin Rashid Al Maktoum Stadium

March 11, 2014 Friendly	Al Wasl FC	1–3	New York Cosmos	Dubai, UAE
11:10 EDT UTC−4	Al-Kathiri 27'; (yellow card) 57'	Report	Senna 7', 90', (yellow card) 90'; Ockford 64'; Freeman (yellow card) 77'; Dimitrov (yellow card) 79'	Stadium: Zabeel Stadium

March 16, 2014 Friendly	Emirates Club	2–1	New York Cosmos	Ras al-Khaimah, UAE
9:10 EDT UTC−4		Report		Stadium: Emirates Club Stadium

April 5, 2014 Friendly	New York Cosmos	3–1	University of Virginia	East Garden City, New York
11:00 EDT UTC−4				Stadium: Mitchel Athletic Complex

=== NASL Spring Season ===
The Spring season will last for 9 games beginning on April 12 and ending on June 8. The schedule will feature a single round robin format with each team playing every other team in the league a single time. Half the teams will host 5 home games and play 4 road games whereas the other half of the teams will play 4 home games and 5 road games. The Cosmos will play 5 of their games at home. The winner of the Spring season will earn the right to host the Soccer Bowl 2014 Championship game.

==== Standings ====
Pos	Team	Pld	W	D	L	GF	GA	GD	Pts	Qualification
1	Minnesota United (S)	9	6	2	1	16	9	+7	20	Playoffs
2	New York Cosmos	9	6	1	2	14	3	+11	19	
3	San Antonio Scorpions	9	5	2	2	13	9	+4	17	
4	Carolina RailHawks	9	4	2	3	11	15	−4	14	
5	Fort Lauderdale Strikers	9	4	1	4	18	18	0	13	
6	Ottawa Fury	9	3	1	5	14	13	+1	10	
7	Tampa Bay Rowdies	9	2	4	3	11	16	−5	10	
8	Atlanta Silverbacks	9	3	1	5	12	20	−8	10	
9	FC Edmonton	9	2	2	5	11	11	0	8	
10	Indy Eleven	9	0	4	5	14	20	−6	4	

Source: NASL Standings
(S) Spring season champion

==== Results ====
Overall								Home						Away					
Pld	W	D	L	GF	GA	GD	Pts	W	D	L	GF	GA	GD	W	D	L	GF	GA	GD
9	6	1	2	14	3	+11	19	3	1	1	7	2	+5	3	0	1	7	1	+6

Last updated: June 8, 2014.
Source: http://www.nasl.com/standings/season/8945

===== Results by round =====
Round	1	2	3	4	5	6	7	8	9
Ground	H	A	H	A	H	A	H	A	H
Result	W	W	L	L	W	W	D	W	W
Position	1	1	2	4	3	2	2	2	2

Updated to match(es) played on June 8, 2014. Source: nasl.com
A = Away; H = Home; W = Win; D = Draw; L = Loss

==== Match reports ====
April 13, 2014 Match 1	New York Cosmos	4–0	Atlanta Silverbacks	Hempstead, New York
16:00 EDT UTC−4	Maurer (yellow card) 12'; Mendes 23', 38'; Ayoze 32' (yellow card) 45'; Stokkelien 72'; Szetela (yellow card) 81'	Report	Gonzalez (yellow card) 22'; Paulini (yellow card) 62'	Stadium: Shuart Stadium; Attendance: 7,906; Referee: Jorge Gonzalez

April 19, 2014 Match 2	FC Edmonton	0–1	New York Cosmos	Edmonton, Alberta
21:00 EDT UTC−4	Nonni (yellow card) 30'; Jones (yellow card) 34'		Díaz (yellow card) 28'; Guenzatti 37'; Maurer (yellow card) 90'	Stadium: Clarke Stadium; Attendance: 4,399; Referee: M. Bourdeau

April 26, 2014 Match 3	New York Cosmos	0–1	San Antonio Scorpions	Hempstead, New York
19:00 EDT UTC−4	Noselli (yellow card) 81'; Szetela (yellow card) 86'	Report	Hassli 15'; James (yellow card) 80'	Stadium: Shuart Stadium; Attendance: 4,130; Referee: Mark Geiger

May 3, 2014 Match 4	Carolina Railhawks	1–0	New York Cosmos	Cary, North Carolina
TBD EDT UTC−4	Tobin (yellow card) 7' (yellow-red card) 63'; Shipalane 12'; Millington (yellow card) 53'; Low (yellow card) 56' (yellow-red card) 68'	Report	Ayoze (yellow card) 38'; Szetela (yellow card) 48'; Guenzatti (red card) 56'	Stadium: WakeMed Soccer Park; Attendance: 4,066; Referee: Jorge Gonzalez

May 12, 2014 Match 5	New York Cosmos	1–0	Minnesota United FC	Hempstead, New York
19:30 EDT UTC−4	Senna (yellow card) 42' (goal) 61'; Diosa (yellow card) 71'	Report	Juliano (yellow card) 22'; Tiago (yellow card) 39'; Davis (yellow card) 63'	Stadium: Shuart Stadium; Attendance: 3,091; Referee: R. Sibiga

May 17, 2014 Match 6	Tampa Bay Rowdies	0–3	New York Cosmos	St. Petersburg, Florida
19:30 EDT UTC−4	Hristov (yellow card) 18'; Thompson (yellow card) 50'; Mkosana (yellow card) 74'	Report	Paulo (yellow card) 37' (goal) 62'; Stokkelien 48'; Ayoze 51'; Dimitrov (yellow card) 86'	Stadium: Al Lang Stadium; Attendance: 4,855; Referee: Daniel Fitzgerald

May 24, 2014 Match 7	New York Cosmos	1–1	Indy Eleven	Hempstead, New York
19:00 EDT UTC−4	Guenzatti 4'; Paulo (yellow card) 61'	Report	Norales (yellow card) 50'; Moore (yellow card) 70'; Ring 76'	Stadium: Shuart Stadium; Attendance: 3,581; Referee: J. Rivero

May 31, 2014 Match 8	Fort Lauderdale Strikers	0–3	New York Cosmos	Fort Lauderdale, Florida
19:30 EDT UTC−4	Nuñez (yellow card) 62'	Report	Freeman (yellow card) 57'; Stokkelien 64' (pen.); Rovérsio (yellow card) 69'; Guenzatti (yellow card) 71'; Ockford 77'; Szetela 80'	Stadium: Lockhart Stadium; Attendance: 5,572; Referee: T. Unkel

June 8, 2014 Match 9	New York Cosmos	1–0	Ottawa Fury FC	Hempstead, New York
17:00 EDT UTC−4	Noselli 6'; Freeman (yellow card) 76'; Ayoze (yellow card) 87'	Report	Beckie (yellow card) 41'; Vini Dantas (yellow card) 68'; Oliver (yellow card) 69'; Elias (yellow card) 76'	Stadium: Shuart Stadium; Attendance: 6,495; Referee: M. Bourdeau

=== NASL Fall Season ===
The Fall season will last for 18 games beginning on July 12 and ending on November 1. The schedule will feature a double round robin format with each team playing every other team in the league twice, one at home and one on the road. The winner of the Fall season will play the winner of the Spring season in the Soccer Bowl 2014 Championship game except if the Spring and Fall Champions are the same team in which case the team with the best overall Spring and Fall record behind that team will be their opponent.

==== Standings ====
Pos	Team	Pld	W	D	L	GF	GA	GD	Pts	Qualification
1	San Antonio Scorpions (F)	18	11	2	5	30	15	+15	35	Playoffs
2	Minnesota United	18	10	5	3	31	19	+12	35	
3	FC Edmonton	18	8	5	5	23	18	+5	29	
4	Fort Lauderdale Strikers	18	7	6	5	20	21	−1	27	
5	Carolina RailHawks	18	7	3	8	27	28	−1	24	
6	New York Cosmos	18	5	8	5	23	24	−1	23	
7	Indy Eleven	18	6	5	7	21	26	−5	23	
8	Tampa Bay Rowdies	18	5	5	8	25	34	−9	20	
9	Ottawa Fury	18	4	5	9	20	25	−5	17	
10	Atlanta Silverbacks	18	3	4	11	20	30	−10	13	

Source: NASL Standings
(F) Fall season champion

==== Results ====
Overall								Home						Away					
Pld	W	D	L	GF	GA	GD	Pts	W	D	L	GF	GA	GD	W	D	L	GF	GA	GD
18	5	8	5	23	24	−1	23	3	4	2	11	10	+1	2	4	3	12	14	−2

Last updated: November 7, 2014.

===== Results by round =====
Round	1	2	3	4	5	6	7	8	9	10	11	12	13	14	15	16	17	18
Ground	H	A	A	H	H	A	A	H	A	H	H	A	A	H	H	A	H	A
Result	L	W	D	L	D	W	L	D	D	W	W	L	D	D	W	D	D	L
Position	9	6	6	8	8	4	7	6	7	5	4	5	5	6	5	5	5	6

Updated to match(es) played on November 7, 2014. Source: Spring season 2014 results
A = Away; H = Home; W = Win; D = Draw; L = Loss

==== Match reports ====
July 12, 2014 Match 1	New York Cosmos	1–3	San Antonio Scorpions	Hempstead, New York
19:00 EDT UTC−4	Nane (yellow card) 36'; Gorskie (yellow card) 45'; Freeman 57' (yellow card) 66'	Report	Castillo 41' (pen.), 45'; Touray 69'	Stadium: Shuart Stadium; Attendance: 3,806; Referee: A. Chapman

July 20, 2014 Match 2	Ottawa Fury FC	0–1	New York Cosmos	Ottawa, Ontario
19:00 EDT UTC−4		Report	Guenzatti 37' (yellow card) 87'; Ayoze (yellow card) 56'; Stokkelien (yellow card) 89'	Stadium: TD Place Stadium; Attendance: 14,593; Referee: D. Barrie

July 26, 2014 Match 3	Fort Lauderdale Strikers	1–1	New York Cosmos	Fort Lauderdale, Florida
19:30 EDT UTC−4	Brito (pen.), 24'; Vieira (red card) 39'; Chin (yellow card) 85'	Report	Johnson 7' (yellow card) 62'; Murphy (yellow card) 15'; Ayoze (yellow card) 24'	Stadium: Lockhart Stadium; Attendance: 3,257; Referee: Y. Marrakchi

August 2, 2014 Match 4	New York Cosmos	0–1	Carolina Railhawks	Hempstead, New York
19:00 EDT UTC−4	Szetela (yellow card) 16'	Report	Low (yellow card) 37'; Shipalane 38'; Graye (yellow card) 45'; Scott (yellow card) 51'	Stadium: Shuart Stadium; Attendance: 4,649; Referee: Alex Chilowicz

August 6, 2014 Match 5	New York Cosmos	0–0	FC Edmonton	Hempstead, New York
19:30 EDT UTC−4	Freeman (yellow card) 45'	Report	Fordyce (yellow card) 42'; Laing (yellow card) 45'; Ameobi (red card) 74'; Hlavaty (yellow card) 81'; Watson (yellow card) 83'; Jonke (yellow card) 90'	Stadium: Shuart Stadium; Attendance: 4,524; Referee: R. Sibiga

August 9, 2014 Match 6	Atlanta Silverbacks	1–2	New York Cosmos	Atlanta, Georgia
19:30 EDT UTC−4	Burgos 12'; Poku (yellow card) 17'; Cruz (yellow card) 41'; Sandoval (red card) 41'; Gonzalez (yellow card) 85'	Report	Flores (yellow card) 37' (goal) 45'; Senna 61'; Nane (yellow card) 71'; Stokkelien (yellow card) 80'	Stadium: Atlanta Silverbacks Park; Attendance: 3,842; Referee: M. Kadlecik

August 16, 2014 Match 7	Tampa Bay Rowdies	3–1	New York Cosmos	St. Petersburg, Florida
19:30 EDT UTC−4	Savage 22'; Russell (yellow card) 53'; Mkandawire 58'; Wagner 90'	Report	Nane (yellow card) 72'; Flores (yellow card) 75'; Dimitrov 81'; Ayoze (yellow card) 87'	Stadium: Al Lang Stadium; Attendance: 4,273; Referee: M. de Oliveira

August 23, 2014 Match 8	New York Cosmos	1–1	Minnesota United FC	Hempstead, New York
19:00 EDT UTC−4	Maurer (red card) 6'; Dimitrov (yellow card) 45'; Ayoze (yellow card) 52'; Stokkelien 74'	Report	Ramirez 8'; Franks (yellow card) 30'; D. Mendes (yellow card) 37'; Juliano (yellow card) 78'	Stadium: Shuart Stadium; Attendance: 3,928; Referee: M. Allatin

August 30, 2014 Match 9	Indy Eleven	2–2	New York Cosmos	Indianapolis, Indiana
19:30 EDT UTC−4	Hyland (yellow card) 33'; Ambersley 61'; Johnson 90'	Report	Diosa 6' (yellow card) 50'; Stokkelien 42'; Szetela (yellow card) 57'	Stadium: Michael Carroll Stadium; Attendance: 10,659; Referee: S. Stoica

September 6, 2014 Match 10	New York Cosmos	2–0	Fort Lauderdale Strikers	Hempstead, New York
19:00 EDT UTC−4	Ayoze (yellow card) 8'; Mwanga 17'; Senna 30' (pen.); Szetela (yellow card) 33'; Diosa (yellow card) 90'	Report	King (yellow card) 72'	Stadium: Shuart Stadium; Attendance: 3,626; Referee: J. Gonzalez

September 13, 2014 Match 11	New York Cosmos	3–2	Atlanta Silverbacks	Hempstead, New York
19:00 EDT UTC−4	Stokkelien 1'; Guenzatti 9'; Diosa (yellow card) 42'; Szetela 84'	Report	Sousa (yellow card) 8'; Sandoval 16' (yellow card) 86'; Rivera (yellow card) 34'; Gonzalez (yellow card) 37'; Cruz 59'	Stadium: Shuart Stadium; Attendance: 4,502; Referee: R. Sibiga

September 20, 2014 Match 12	Carolina RailHawks	5–4	New York Cosmos	Cary, North Carolina
19:30 EDT UTC−4	Albadawi (yellow card) 36'; Sandoval 48', 67'; Osaki 58'; Martínez 65'; Schilawski 78'	Report	Freeman (yellow card) 61'; Watson-Siriboe 64' (o.g.); Ockford 69'; Stokkelien 80'; Dimitrov 89'	Stadium: WakeMed Soccer Park; Attendance: 5,593; Referee: M. Kadlecik

September 28, 2014 Match 13	FC Edmonton	1–1	New York Cosmos	Edmonton, Alberta
16:00 EDT UTC−4	Burt (yellow card) 57'; Ameobi 62'; Hlavaty (yellow card) 74'; Moses (yellow card) 90'	Report	Lade (yellow card) 27'; Szetela 51'; Stokkelien (yellow card) 56'	Stadium: Clarke Stadium; Attendance: 3,830; Referee: R. Schaap

October 4, 2014 Match 14	New York Cosmos	0–0	Indy Eleven	Hempstead, New York
20:00 EDT UTC−4	Mendes (yellow card) 43'; Senna (yellow card) 78'	Report	Ambersley (yellow card) 82'; Norales (yellow card) 85'	Stadium: Shuart Stadium; Attendance: 6,225; Referee: J. Gonzalez

October 11, 2014 Match 15	New York Cosmos	2–1	Ottawa Fury	Hempstead, New York
19:30 EDT UTC−4	Szetela (yellow card) 11'; Díaz 43'; Ayoze (yellow card) 55'; Chirishian 90+3'	Report	Trafford (yellow card) 31'; Eustaquio (yellow card) 37'; Woodbine (yellow card) 48'; Heinemann 58' (yellow card) 90+2' (yellow-red card) 90+4'; Jarun (yellow card) 63'; Paterson (yellow card) 79'; Richter (yellow card) 84'	Stadium: Shuart Stadium; Attendance: 4,411; Referee: D. Fitzgerald

October 18, 2014 Match 16	Minnesota United FC	0–0	New York Cosmos	Blaine, Minnesota
19:00 EDT UTC−4	Jordan (yellow card) 36'; Davis (yellow card) 41'; Pitchkolan (yellow card) 65'; Tiago (yellow card) 90+3'	Report	Szetela (yellow card) 35'; Johnson (yellow card) 48'; Mendes (red card) 85'	Stadium: National Sports Center; Attendance: 5,817; Referee: Y. Marrakchi

October 25, 2014 Match 17	New York Cosmos	2–2	Tampa Bay Rowdies	Hempstead, New York
19:00 EDT UTC−4	Chirishian 27'; Senna 49' (red card) 90+5'; Freeman (yellow card) 59'; Gorskie (yellow card) 63'; Maurer (yellow card) 88'	Report	Frimpong 25', 90+1'; Olguín (yellow card) 59'; Wagner (yellow card) 76'; Russell (red card) 90+5'	Stadium: Shuart Stadium; Attendance: 8,565; Referee: T. Unkel

November 1, 2014 Match 18	San Antonio Scorpions	1–0	New York Cosmos	San Antonio, Texas
20:00 EDT UTC−4	Menjivar (yellow card) 76'; Elizondo (yellow card) 80'; Gentile (yellow card) 85'; Cann 90+5'; Forbes (yellow card) 90+5'	Report	Diosa (yellow card) 86'; Denissen (yellow card) 90+1'	Stadium: Toyota Field; Attendance: 8,205; Referee: M. de Oliveira

=== The Championship ===
November 8, 2014 Semi-Final	San Antonio Scorpions	2–1 (a.e.t.)	New York Cosmos	San Antonio
20:30 EST UTC−4	Castillo 19' (yellow card) 55'; DeRoux (yellow card) 83'; Mendes 110' (o.g.)	Report	Stokkelien 17'; Szetela (yellow card) 114'	Stadium: Toyota Field; Attendance: 6,548; Referee: R. Salazar

=== U.S. Open Cup ===
The Cosmos will compete in the 2014 edition of the Open Cup entering in the Third Round of the tournament. The club has said should they host the Third Round match they will play it at Belson Stadium if they are selected as a host for that round due to Shuart Stadium not being available.

==== Match reports ====
May 28, 2014 3rd round	New York Cosmos	2–0	Brooklyn Italians	Jamaica, New York
19:30 EDT UTC−4	Chirishian (yellow card) 4' (goal) 30'; Ockford 16'; Szetela (yellow card) 54'; Freeman (yellow card) 69'	Report	Diese (yellow card) 39' (yellow-red card) 82'; Barone (yellow card) 52' (yellow-red card) 53'	Stadium: Belson Stadium; Attendance: 1,851; Referee: Andres Pfefferkorn

June 14, 2014 4th round	New York Cosmos	3–0	New York Red Bulls	Hempstead, New York
8:30pm EDT UTC−4	Stokkelien 7', 73'; Sztelea (yellow card) 62'; Noselli 78'	Report; Box Score	Sekagya (yellow card) 21'; Duvall (red card) 87'; Wright-Phillips (yellow card) 90'	Stadium: James M. Shuart Stadium; Attendance: 9,364; Referee: Kevin Terry Jr

June 24, 2014 5th round	Philadelphia Union	2–1 (a.e.t.)	New York Cosmos	Chester, Pennsylvania
7:00pm EDT UTC−4	Carroll (yellow card) 21'; Cruz (yellow card) 29'; LeToux 57', 114' (pen.); Fabinho (yellow card) 67'; Lahoud (red card) 119'	Report	Noselli 56' (yellow card) 112'; Maurer (yellow card) 113'; Ayoze (red card) 119'; Ockford (red card) 120'	Stadium: PPL Park; Attendance: 3,846; Referee: Ismail Elfath

== Squad statistics ==
As of Match played November 8, 2014 (final)

=== Appearances and goals ===
No.	Pos	Nat	Player	Total		NASL Spring Season		NASL Fall Season		NASL Playoffs		U.S. Open Cup	
No.	Pos	Nat	Player	Apps	Goals	Apps	Goals	Apps	Goals	Apps	Goals	Apps	Goals
1	GK	(United States) USA	Jimmy Maurer	28	0	9+0	0	15+0	0	1+0	0	3+0	0
2	DF	(United States) USA	Hunter Freeman	30	1	9+0	0	17+0	1	1+0	0	2+1	0
3	DF	(United States) USA	Hunter Gorskie	15	0	0+3	0	7+2	0	1+0	0	1+1	0
4	DF	(United States) USA	Carlos Mendes	29	2	9+0	2	16+0	0	1+0	0	3+0	0
5	MF	(Cameroon) CMR	Joseph Nane	25	0	6+2	0	7+6	0	1+0	0	2+1	0
6	DF	(Brazil) BRA	Rovérsio	16	0	8+0	0	6+1	0	0+0	0	1+0	0
7	MF	(Spain) ESP	Ayoze	26	2	8+0	2	14+0	0	1+0	0	3+0	0
8	MF	(Venezuela) VEN	Diomar Díaz	13	1	4+1	0	4+3	1	1+0	0	0+0	0
11	FW	(El Salvador) ESA	Andrés Flores	8	1	0+0	0	7+1	1	0+0	0	0+0	0
12	GK	(United States) USA	Kyle Zobeck	4	0	0+0	0	3+1	0	0+0	0	0+0	0
13	MF	(Uruguay) URU	Sebastián Guenzatti	26	4	7+0	2	12+3	2	0+1	0	3+0	0
14	MF	(United States) USA	Danny Szetela	27	3	6+2	1	15+0	2	1+0	0	3+0	0
15	DF	(United States) USA	Jimmy Ockford	13	3	1+1	1	6+2	1	0+0	0	2+1	1
16	MF	(United States) USA	Dane Murphy	10	0	0+2	0	4+1	0	0+0	0	1+2	0
17	FW	(Bulgaria) BUL	Stefan Dimitrov	14	2	1+4	0	3+5	2	0+0	0	1+0	0
18	FW	(Norway) NOR	Mads Stokkelien	30	10	9+0	3	15+3	4	1+0	1	2+0	2
19	MF	(Spain) ESP	Marcos Senna	20	4	7+0	1	9+3	3	1+0	0	0+0	0
20	FW	(Netherlands) NED	Hans Denissen	14	0	0+1	0	5+5	0	0+1	0	0+2	0
21	FW	(Colombia) COL	David Diosa	9	1	3+1	0	4+1	1	0+0	0	0+0	0
22	FW	(United States) USA	Danny Mwanga	8	1	0+0	0	8+0	1	0+0	0	0+0	0
23	MF	(United States) USA	Connor Lade	7	0	0+0	0	7+0	0	0+0	0	0+0	0
25	MF	(United States) USA	Hagop Chirishian	18	3	1+3	0	4+6	2	1+0	0	3+0	1
27	MF	(United States) USA	Jemal Johnson	21	1	3+3	0	7+6	1	0+1	0	0+1	0
28	DF	(United States) USA	Jimmy Mulligan	2	0	0+0	0	2+0	0	0+0	0	0+0	0
33	DF	(United States) USA	James Nealis	2	0	1+0	0	1+0	0	0+0	0	0+0	0
Players who appeared for the New York Cosmos who are no longer at the club:
22	FW	(Italy) ITA	Alessandro Noselli	8	3	3+2	1	0+0	0	0+0	0	3+0	2
30	MF	(Brazil) BRA	Paulo Ferreira-Mendes	7	1	4+1	1	0+2	0	0+0	0	0+0	0

=== Goal scorers ===
Place	Position	Nation	Number	Name	NASL Spring Season	NASL Fall Season	NASL Playoffs	U.S. Open Cup	Total
1	FW	(Norway)	18	Mads Stokkelien	3	4	1	2	10
2	MF	(Uruguay)	13	Sebastián Guenzatti	2	2	0	0	4
2	MF	(Spain)	19	Marcos Senna	1	3	0	0	4
4	MF	(United States)	14	Danny Szetela	1	2	0	0	3
4	DF	(United States)	15	Jimmy Ockford	1	1	0	1	3
4	FW	(Italy)	22	Alessandro Noselli	1	0	0	2	3
4	FW	(United States)	25	Hagop Chirishian	0	2	0	1	3
8	DF	(United States)	4	Carlos Mendes	2	0	0	0	2
8	MF	(Spain)	7	Ayoze	2	0	0	0	2
8	FW	(Bulgaria)	17	Stefan Dimitrov	0	2	0	0	2
11	DF	(United States)	2	Hunter Freeman	0	1	0	0	1
11	FW	(Venezuela)	8	Diomar Díaz	0	1	0	0	1
11	FW	(El Salvador)	11	Andrés Flores	0	1	0	0	1
11	FW	(Colombia)	21	David Diosa	0	1	0	0	1
11	FW	(United States)	22	Danny Mwanga	0	1	0	0	1
11	MF	(United States)	27	Jemal Johnson	0	1	0	0	1
11	MF	(Brazil)	30	Paulo	1	0	0	0	1
TOTALS					14	22	1	6	43

=== Disciplinary record ===
Number	Nation	Position	Name	NASL Spring Season		NASL Fall Season		NASL Playoffs		U.S. Open Cup		Total	
Number	Nation	Position	Name	Yellow card	Red card	Yellow card	Red card	Yellow card	Red card	Yellow card	Red card	Yellow card	Red card
1	(United States)	GK	Jimmy Maurer	2	0	1	1	0	0	1	0	4	1
2	(United States)	DF	Hunter Freeman	2	0	4	0	0	0	1	0	7	0
3	(United States)	DF	Hunter Gorskie	0	0	2	0	0	0	0	0	2	0
4	(United States)	DF	Carlos Mendes	0	0	1	1	0	0	0	0	1	1
5	(Cameroon)	MF	Joseph Nane	0	0	3	0	0	0	0	0	3	0
6	(Brazil)	DF	Rovérsio	1	0	0	0	0	0	0	0	1	0
7	(Spain)	MF	Ayoze	3	0	6	0	0	0	0	1	9	1
8	(Venezuela)	FW	Diomar Díaz	1	0	0	0	0	0	0	0	1	0
11	(El Salvador)	FW	Andrés Flores	0	0	2	0	0	0	0	0	2	0
13	(Uruguay)	MF	Sebastián Guenzatti	1	1	1	0	0	0	0	0	2	1
14	(United States)	MF	Danny Szetela	3	0	5	0	1	0	2	0	11	0
15	(United States)	DF	Jimmy Ockford	0	0	0	0	0	0	0	1	0	1
16	(United States)	MF	Dane Murphy	0	0	1	0	0	0	0	0	1	0
17	(Bulgaria)	FW	Stefan Dimitrov	1	0	1	0	0	0	0	0	2	0
18	(Norway)	FW	Mads Stokkelien	0	0	3	0	0	0	0	0	3	0
19	(Spain)	MF	Marcos Senna	1	0	1	1	0	0	0	0	2	1
20	(Netherlands)	FW	Hans Denissen	0	0	1	0	0	0	0	0	1	0
21	(Colombia)	FW	David Diosa	1	0	4	0	0	0	0	0	5	0
22	(Italy)	FW	Alessandro Noselli	1	0	0	0	0	0	1	0	2	0
23	(United States)	MF	Connor Lade	0	0	1	0	0	0	0	0	1	0
25	(United States)	MF	Hagop Chirishian	0	0	0	0	0	0	1	0	1	0
27	(United States)	MF	Jemal Johnson	0	0	2	0	0	0	0	0	2	0
30	(Brazil)	MF	Paulo Ferreira-Mendes	2	0	0	0	0	0	0	0	2	0
			TOTALS	19	1	39	3	1	0	6	2	65	6

== Transfers ==
=== In ===
No.	Pos.	Player	Transferred from	Fee/notes	Date	Source
20	FW	(Netherlands) Hans Denissen	(United States) San Antonio Scorpions		January 2, 2014	
18	FW	(Norway) Mads Stokkelien	(Norway) Stabæk		January 31, 2014	

=== Out ===
No.	Pos.	Player	Transferred to	Fee/notes	Date	Source
24	GK	(United States) Kyle Reynish	(United States) Chicago Fire		January 10, 2014	
12	GK	(United States) Chad Calderone	(United States) Free Agent	Free	February 2014	
23	DF	(Colombia) Juan Gonzalez	(United States) Free Agent	Free	February 2014	
26	FW	(Japan) Satoru Kashiwase	(Japan) Shimizu S-Pulse	Loan return		
15	DF	(United States) Korey Veeder	(United States) Free Agent	Free		
18	FW	(Guatemala) Henry David López	(United States) Free Agent	Free		
20	DF	(United States) Chris Rodd	(United States) Free Agent	Free		
28	MF	(Chile) Edison Bilbao	(Malta) Balzan			
11	FW	(United States) Peri Marošević	(United States) Free Agent	Free	July 7, 2014	
22	FW	(Italy) Alessandro Noselli	(Italy) Free Agent	Free	July 12, 2014	
30	FW	(Brazil) Paulo Ferreira-Mendes	(United States) Atlanta Silverbacks	Free	August 28, 2014	

=== Loan In ===
No.	Pos.	Player	Transferred from	Fee/notes	Date	Source
15	DF	(United States) Jimmy Ockford	(United States) Seattle Sounders FC	Season long	February 26, 2014	
11	FW	(El Salvador) Andrés Flores	(El Salvador) Isidro Metapán	Season long	July 18, 2014	
23	DF	(United States) Connor Lade	(United States) New York Red Bulls	Assignment	July 28, 2014	
22	FW	(United States) Danny Mwanga	(United States) Colorado Rapids	Season Long	August 28, 2014	

=== Loan Out ===
No.	Pos.	Player	Transferred to	Fee/notes	Date	Source
30	MF	(Brazil) Paulo Ferreira-Mendes	(Venezuela) Metropolitanos	Season long	July 31, 2014	
