= Gonzalo De Mujica =

Argentinean association football player

Personal information
- Date of birth: 31 January 1990 (age 36)
- Place of birth: Buenos Aires, Argentina
- Height: 1.75 m (5 ft 9 in)
- Position: Midfielder

Youth career
- 2008–2011: Stetson Hatters

Senior career*
Years	Team	Apps	(Gls)
2009–2010	Central Florida Kraze	16	(3)
2011	FC JAX Destroyers	13	(6)
2012	Orlando City U-23	6	(1)
2013–2014	Fort Lauderdale Strikers	10	(0)
- * Club domestic league appearances and goals as of 18 June 2014

Gonzalo De Mujica (born 31 January 1989) is an Argentinian professional soccer player who last played as a midfielder for Fort Lauderdale Strikers in the North American Soccer League.

== Career ==
=== Early career ===
Born in Buenos Aires, De Mujica attended Stetson University and played for the soccer team, the Stetson Hatters, from 2008 to 2011. While at school he also played for various USL PDL sides like the Central Florida Craze, FC JAX Destroyers, and Orlando City U-23.

=== Fort Lauderdale Strikers ===
On 31 January 2013 De Mujica signed for the Fort Lauderdale Strikers of the North American Soccer League. He made his professional debut for the side on 18 May 2013 against the San Antonio Scorpions at Toyota Field in which he came on as a 72nd-minute substitute for Jemal Johnson as Fort Lauderdale lost the match 3–1.

== Career statistics ==
As of 31 August 2013

Club	Season	League			League Cup		Domestic Cup		International		Total	
Club	Season	Division	Apps	Goals	Apps	Goals	Apps	Goals	Apps	Goals	Apps	Goals
Fort Lauderdale Strikers	2013	NASL	5	0	0	0	0	0	—	—	5	0
Career total			5	0	0	0	0	0	0	0	5	0
