= Wálter Restrepo =

American soccer player (born 1988)

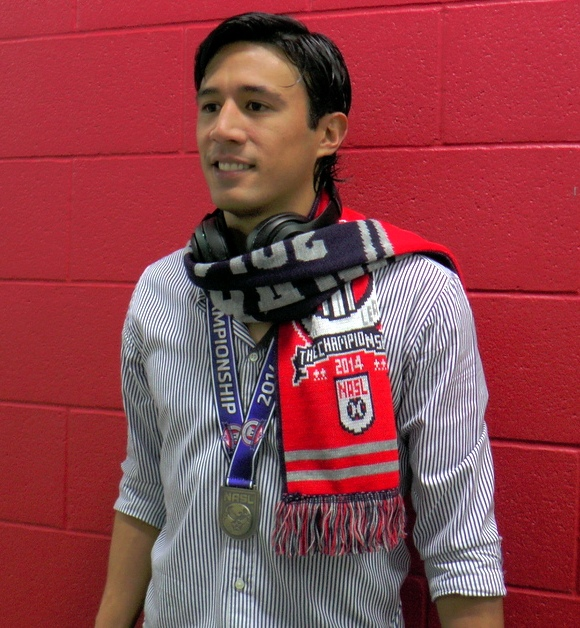
- Restrepo after winning Soccer Bowl 2014 with the San Antonio Scorpions

Personal information
- Full name: Wálter Restrepo Uribe
- Date of birth: June 21, 1988 (age 38)
- Place of birth: San Diego, California, United States
- Height: 5 ft 8 in (1.73 m)
- Position: Midfielder

Youth career
- –2006: Deportes Tolima U-19

Senior career*
Years	Team	Apps	(Gls)
2006–2008	Deportes Tolima	5	(0)
2008–2009	Expreso Rojo	2	(0)
2009–2010	Boyacá Chicó	8	(0)
2010–2011	Expreso Rojo		
2011–2013	Fort Lauderdale Strikers	51	(10)
2014	San Antonio Scorpions	25	(3)
2015	New York Cosmos	22	(3)
2016	Philadelphia Union	4	(0)
2016	→ Bethlehem Steel (loan)	8	(0)
2017	New York Cosmos	13	(2)
2017	Tampa Bay Rowdies	15	(1)
2018	Deportes Tolima	0	(0)
2019	San Antonio FC	25	(3)
2021–2022	Rome Gladiators (indoor)	0	(0)

International career
- Colombia U-17
- * Club domestic league appearances and goals as of 31 March 2022

Wálter Restrepo Uribe (born June 21, 1988) is an American-born Colombian football player.

== Career ==
=== 2006–2010 ===
He played professionally in Colombia from 2006 to 2010, appearing in both the first and second division for Deportes Tolima, Boyacá Chicó and Expreso Rojo. He has also represented the Colombia national team at the U17 level.

=== Fort Lauderdale Strikers ===
==== 2011 ====
Retrepo signed with the Fort Lauderdale Strikers on July 11, 2011, midway through the 2011 NASL season. He made his debut for the Strikers in a 3–0 win against FC Edmonton on July 30. Restrepo scored his first goal for the Strikers in his first start with the club, beating Brad Knighton with a half-volley from 30 yards out. Restrepo's goal, along with the stoppage-time winner from Martin Nuñez in the same game, was voted by fans as the #1 play of 2011. Restrepo scored his second goal for the Strikers in the 3–1 victory against the Puerto Rico Islanders in the semifinal round of the playoffs. He ended his first season with the Strikers having made a total of twelve appearances in all competitions, scoring two goals and a single assist.

==== 2012 ====
In December 2011, the Strikers announced that they had picked up Restrepo's option for the 2012 season. He switched from the number 19 jersey to the iconic 10 shirt after Mike Palacio signed with the RailHawks. Restrepo began the season as the Strikers' main playmaker, occupying the hole behind the forwards. On April 21, he assisted both Andy Herron's goals in the 2–2 draw with the San Antonio Scorpions. A week later, he scored his first goal of the season against rivals Tampa Bay Rowdies in the 90th minute of the 3–1 loss.

After the emergence of teammate Mark Anderson in the attacking midfield position, Restrepo moved to the right side of midfield. On July 7, Restrepo recorded his first multi-goal game, scoring twice against the RailHawks in a 3–3 draw at WakeMed Soccer Park. The Strikers extended Restrepo's contract on July 17 to carry through the 2013 season, with an option for 2014. On July 28 against the Atlanta Silverbacks, Restrepo scored his sixth goal of the season and extended his league-lead in assists from six to eight.

On August 15, the Strikers announced that Restrepo would miss the remainder of the season after suffering an ACL tear.

==== 2013 ====
Restrepo made his return from injury in the first match of the 2013 season on April 6—nearly 8 months after tearing his ACL. He replaced Rubens in the 65th minute to a rapturous applause, sparking a comeback 1–1 tie with FC Edmonton in his 25-minute cameo.

Restrepo forced what was later considered an own goal by the New York Cosmos in the 2014 NASL semi-final during extra-time. That goal would be the game winner and would send the eventual champions, San Antonio Scorpions, into the championship match.

=== New York Cosmos ===
On January 19, 2015, Restrepo signed with the New York Cosmos.

=== Philadelphia Union ===
On January 12, 2016, Restrepo signed with the Philadelphia Union for an undisclosed transfer fee. At the conclusion of the season, Restrepo's contract was declined by the Union after making 4 appearances for the club and 8 for its USL reserve team, Bethlehem Steel FC.

=== Return to New York Cosmos ===
On January 31, 2017, Restrepo re-signed with the New York Cosmos. Restrepo played 13 games for the Cosmos during the NASL's Spring Season, notching 2 goals and 2 assists.

=== Tampa Bay Rowdies ===
On July 20, he was released by New York in order to sign with the Tampa Bay Rowdies.

=== San Antonio FC ===
On November 20, 2018, USL side San Antonio FC announced the signing of Restropo.

== Career statistics ==
=== Club ===
Statistics accurate as of August 15, 2012

Club	Season	League			Cup			Playoffs			Total		
Club	Season	Apps	Goals	Assists	Apps	Goals	Assists	Apps	Goals	Assists	Apps	Goals	Assists
Fort Lauderdale Strikers	2011	7	1	0	—	—	—	5	1	1	12	2	1
Fort Lauderdale Strikers	2012	21	6	8	2	1	1	0	0	0	22	7	9
Fort Lauderdale Strikers	2013	4	1	0	0	0	0	—	—	—	4	1	0
Career total		32	8	8	2	1	1	5	1	1	38	10	10
