= Francisco Arriagada =

Chilean footballer (born 1994)

Personal information
- Full name: Francisco Bernardo Arriagada Mella
- Date of birth: 31 January 1994 (age 32)
- Place of birth: Talcahuano, Chile
- Height: 1.77 m (5 ft 10 in)
- Position: Attacking midfielder

Team information
- Current team: Vittoriosa Stars

Youth career
- 2003–2013: Huachipato

Senior career*
Years	Team	Apps	(Gls)
2013	Mosta	1	(0)
2013–2015	Vittoriosa Stars	14	(0)
2015–2016	Fgura United		
2016–2017	Deportes Limache	–	(–)
2017–2018	Vittoriosa Stars		
2018	Fgura United		
2019	Barnechea	1	(0)
2020–2021	Montijo	15	(1)
2021	Fuente Cantos	17	(0)
2024–	Vittoriosa Stars		

International career
- Chile U15
- Chile U17
- * Club domestic league appearances and goals

Francisco Bernardo Arriagada Mella (born 31 January 1994) is a Chilean footballer who plays as an attacking midfielder for Vittoriosa Stars.

== Career ==
An attacking midfielder from the Huachipato youth system, Arriagada took part of Chile youth national teams from under-14 to under-17 level, coinciding with players such as Ángelo Henríquez, Igor Lichnovsky, Andrés Robles, among others. After ending his contract with Huachipato in 2013, he emigrated to Europe thanks to a group of businessmen.

After tried to sign with Swiss side Lugano, he joined Maltese club Mosta in the Premier League. In Malta, he also has played for Vittoriosa Stars and Fgura United. In the Maltese football, he coincided with his compatriots Edison Bilbao and Juan Manuel Artiaga.

In his homeland, he has played for Deportes Limache in 2016–17 and Barnechea in 2019.

From 2020 to 2021, he played in Spain for UD Montijo, where he coincided with his compatriots Nicolás Clavería and Rodrigo Gattas, and UD Fuente de Cantos.

In the second half of 2024, Arriagada rejoined Vittoriosa Stars.

== Personal life ==
He is nicknamed Pancho, an affective form of Francisco.

He married Constanza López, who is the niece of the former Chile international footballer Luis Jiménez.
