= Mike Dietze =

American soccer player

Personal information
- Full name: Mike Dietze
- Date of birth: July 19, 1989 (age 37)
- Place of birth: Ridgewood, New Jersey, United States
- Height: 5 ft 10 in (1.78 m)
- Position: Defensive midfielder

Youth career
- 2008–2011: Seton Hall Pirates

Senior career*
Years	Team	Apps	(Gls)
2012	New Jersey Rangers	16	(4)
2013	Fort Lauderdale Strikers	1	(0)
2014–?	Philadelphia Fury	10	(1)
- * Club domestic league appearances and goals as of November 8, 2014

Mike Dietze (born July 19, 1989) is an American soccer player.

== Career ==
Born in Ridgewood, New Jersey, Dietze grew up in Ramsey, New Jersey and played high school soccer at Don Bosco Preparatory High School.

He played four years of college soccer at Seton Hall University beginning in 2008 and played in the USL Premier Development League for NJ-LUSO Rangers FC. He made 16 appearances for the Rangers in 2012, tallying 4 goals and 2 assists. Dietze participated in the 2013 NASL Combine where he was noticed by the Strikers' coaching staff and was invited to preseason with the team. On March 25, 2013, the Strikers announced that he had signed his first professional contract with the club. In 2014, Dietze signed with the Philadelphia Fury for the inaugural season of the ASL, where he played in all 10 matches, scoring once.
