= Stéphane Guillaume =

Haitian footballer (born 1984)

Personal information
- Date of birth: February 9, 1984 (age 42)
- Place of birth: Saint-Marc, Haiti
- Height: 6 ft 1 in (1.85 m)
- Position: Defender

Senior career*
Years	Team	Apps	(Gls)
2002–2004	Aigle Noir		
2005	Colorado Rapids	0	(0)
2006–2008	Miami FC	24	(0)
2009	Cleveland City Stars	12	(0)
2013–2015	Fort Lauderdale Strikers	18	(0)
2017	CASA Team Haiti		

International career
2003–2009	Haiti	29	(0)
- * Club domestic league appearances and goals

Stéphane Guillaume (born February 9, 1984) is a Haitian former professional footballer who played as a defender. He spent most of his career playing in the MLS. At international level, he played for the Haiti national team.

== Club career ==
Guillaume began his professional career with Aigle Noir AC in Ligue Haïtienne, before moving to MLS team Colorado Rapids in 2005. However, Guillaume was unable to play due to regulatory matters, and moved to Miami FC for its inaugural season in February 2006. He played in Miami for two years then He had a big right knee surgery which kept him out of the field for the 2008 season.

He signed with Cleveland City Stars on May 16, 2009, and made his debut for the team the same day, against Minnesota Thunder.

Guillaume returned to the United States in 2013, signing professional terms with Fort Lauderdale Strikers on March 29, 2013.

== International career ==
Guillaume played for all the youth Haitian teams U-17, while playing for U-20 and U-23 teams Stephane was also playing for the major Haitian national team in a February 2003 friendly match against Peru. Guillaume was part of the Haiti team which won the 2007 Caribbean Nations Cup, and was in the Haiti squad at the 2007 CONCACAF Gold Cup.

== Honours ==
- Caribbean Nations Cup: 2007
