= Scott Gordon (soccer) =

American soccer player

Personal information
- Full name: Scott Joseph Gordon
- Date of birth: April 6, 1988 (age 38)
- Place of birth: Boca Raton, Florida, United States
- Height: 6 ft 4 in (1.93 m)
- Position: Defender

Team information
- Current team: Boca Raton Football Club

Youth career
- 2006: Mercer Bears
- 2007–2010: Lynn Fighting Knights

Senior career*
Years	Team	Apps	(Gls)
2010	Baton Rouge Capitals	14	(1)
2011	Fort Lauderdale Strikers	19	(1)
2012	Chivas USA	3	(0)
2012–2013	Fort Lauderdale Strikers	20	(3)
- * Club domestic league appearances and goals as of February 14, 2014

Scott Joseph Gordon (born April 6, 1988) is an American soccer player.

== Career ==
=== College and amateur ===
Gordon grew up in Boca Raton, Florida, attended Spanish River High School, and began his college soccer career at Mercer University, transferring to Lynn University prior to his sophomore year in 2007. After missing all of 2008 due to injury Gordon returned to the field for his junior season in 2009, appearing in 12 games and receiving an All-Sunshine State Conference Honorable Mention. He finished his college career with 28 games, logging five goals, four assists and 14 points. He was a two-time All-Sunshine State Conference honoree, and collected NSCAA All-South Region recognition honors as a senior.

During his college years Gordon also played for the Baton Rouge Capitals in the USL Premier Development League, scoring one goal in 14 games and helping the Capitals to the PDL national playoff semi finals in 2010.

=== Professional ===
Gordon was drafted in the third round (53rd overall) of the 2011 MLS SuperDraft by FC Dallas, after a standout performance in a friendly organized by Ft. Lauderdale Strikers scout Marcelo Castillo vs the United States U20 national team just days before the MLS SuperDraft, but was not offered a professional contract by the team.

Gordon subsequently signed with the Fort Lauderdale Strikers of the North American Soccer League and made his professional debut—and scored his first professional goal—for the Strikers on April 29, 2011, in a 2–2 tie with the Puerto Rico Islanders.

On March 16, 2012, Chivas USA signed Gordon from the Fort Lauderdale Strikers.

Chivas USA waived Gordon on July 6, 2012.

== Career statistics ==
Statistics accurate as of March 29, 2013

Club	Season	League			Cup			Playoffs			Total		
Club	Season	Apps	Goals	Assists	Apps	Goals	Assists	Apps	Goals	Assists	Apps	Goals	Assists
Fort Lauderdale Strikers	2011	19	1	1	—	—	—	4	0	0	23	1	1
Fort Lauderdale Strikers	2012	11	1	1	—	—	—	1	0	0	12	1	1
Fort Lauderdale Strikers	2013	0	0	0	0	0	0	—	—	—	0	0	0
Career total		30	2	2	0	0	0	4	0	0	35	2	2
