= North American Soccer League records and statistics =

The following is a compilation of notable records and statistics for teams and players in and seasons of North American Soccer League.

== All-Time Regular Season Successes ==
Through completion of 2013 regular season.

Rank	Club	1st	2nd	3rd	4th
1	Carolina Railhawks	1	2	0	1
2	San Antonio Scorpions	1	0	1	0
3	Atlanta Silverbacks	1	0	0	0
4	New York Cosmos	1	0	0	0
5	Tampa Bay Rowdies	0	1	2	1
6	Puerto Rico Islanders	0	1	1	0
7	Fort Lauderdale Strikers	0	0	0	1
8	Minnesota United FC	0	0	0	1

== All-Time Regular Season Records ==
Through completion of 2013 regular season.

Pts Rank	Club	Seasons	GP	W	L	T	GF	GA	GD	Pts	Pts Per Game	1st	2nd	3rd	4th
Pts Rank	Club	Seasons	GP	W	L	T	GF	GA	GD	Pts	Pts Per Game	Finishing Positions.			
1	Carolina RailHawks	3 (2011–)	82	39	20	23	135	104	31	137	1.67	1	2	0	1
2	Tampa Bay Rowdies	3 (2011–)	82	33	25	24	129	109	20	124	1.51	0	1	2	1
3	Minnesota United FC	3 (2011–)	82	27	25	31	103	107	-4	105	1.28	0	0	0	1
4	Fort Lauderdale Strikers	3 (2011–)	82	25	24	32	103	126	-23	100	1.22	0	0	0	1
5	Puerto Rico Islanders	2 (2011–12)	56	26	15	15	70	59	11	93	1.66	0	1	1	0
6	FC Edmonton	3 (2011–)	82	21	28	33	87	102	-15	91	1.11	0	0	0	0
7	Atlanta Silverbacks	3 (2011–)	82	21	20	41	94	146	-52	83	1.01	1	0	0	0
8	San Antonio Scorpions	2 (2012–)	54	22	11	21	80	66	14	77	1.43	1	0	1	0
9	Montreal Impact	1 (2011)	28	9	8	11	32	24	8	35	1.25	0	0	0	0
10	New York Cosmos	1 (2013–)	14	9	4	1	22	12	10	31	2.21	1	0	0	0

== Highest scoring games ==
Goals scored	Date	Home team	Result	Away team
11	3 August 2013	San Antonio Scorpions	4 – 7	Tampa Bay Rowdies
9	10 September 2014	Carolina RailHawks	5 – 4	New York Cosmos
8	28 July 2012	San Antonio Scorpions	8 – 0	Carolina RailHawks
8	27 July 2012	Fort Lauderdale Strikers	5 – 3	Atlanta Silverbacks
8	15 April 2012	Carolina RailHawks	4 – 4	Atlanta Silverbacks
7	8 June 2014	FC Edmonton	6 – 1	Carolina RailHawks

== Biggest winning margin ==
Winning margin	Date	Home team	Result	Away team
8	28 July 2012	San Antonio Scorpions	8 – 0	Carolina RailHawks
5	1 May 2011	FC Edmonton	0 – 5	Montreal Impact
5	8 June 2014	FC Edmonton	6 – 1	Carolina RailHawks

== Streaks ==
=== Winning streaks ===
Most consecutive Wins
Team	No.	From	To
Carolina RailHawks	10	7 May 2011	3 July 2011
San Antonio Scorpions	5	1 June 2013	4 July 2013
New York Cosmos	5	14 September 2013	24 October 2013

=== Undefeated streaks ===
Most consecutive Wins/Ties
Team	No.	From	To
Carolina RailHawks	13	16 April 2011	3 July 2011
New York Cosmos	13	24 August 2013	Present

italics streaks still active, as of April 19, 2014

=== Losing streaks ===
Most Consecutive Losses
Team	No.	From	To
Atlanta Silverbacks	6	30 July 2011	27 August 2011
Atlanta Silverbacks	5	9 June 2012	3 July 2012
San Antonio Scorpions	5	3 August 2013	31 August 2013

=== Winless streaks ===
Most Consecutive Losses/Ties
Team	No.	From	To
Atlanta Silverbacks	9	9 April 2011	4 June 2011
Atlanta Silverbacks	9	7 April 2012	26 May 2012
Carolina RailHawks	9	7 April 2012	19 May 2012
Minnesota Stars FC	9	18 July 2012	8 September 2012

== Average Season Attendances ==
- Highest single attendance - 13,151 San Antonio Scorpions vs Puerto Rico Islanders, 15 April 2012.
- Lowest single attendance - 520 Puerto Rico Islanders vs FC Edmonton, 18 April 2012.
- Highest average attendance - 11,507 Montreal Impact, 2011 Season.
- Lowest average attendance - 1,525 FC Edmonton, 2012 Season.

== Trivia ==
- The longest unbeaten end to a season was achieved by the New York Cosmos in 2013, who closed the campaign thirteen matches unbeaten (with eight wins and three draws).
- The highest number of points achieved by a team during a regular season (inclusive of Spring / Fall) was 54 (17–3–8), by Carolina RailHawks in 2011.
- The lowest number of points achieved by a team during a regular season (inclusive of Spring / Fall) was 16 (4–4–20), by Atlanta Silverbacks in 2011.
- The highest number of points achieved by a team at home during a regular season (inclusive of Spring / Fall) was 34 (11–1–2), by Carolina RailHawks in 2011.
- The highest number of points achieved by a team on the road during a regular season (inclusive of Spring / Fall) was 20 (5–5–4), by the San Antonio Scorpions in 2012.
- The highest number of points achieved by a team on in a split season 31 (9–4–1), by the New York Cosmos in Fall 2013.
- The lowest number of points achieved by a team on in a split season 8 (2–2–8), by the Fort Lauderdale Strikers in Spring 2013.

== See also ==
Major League Soccer records and statistics
