= Jemal Johnson =

American former soccer player

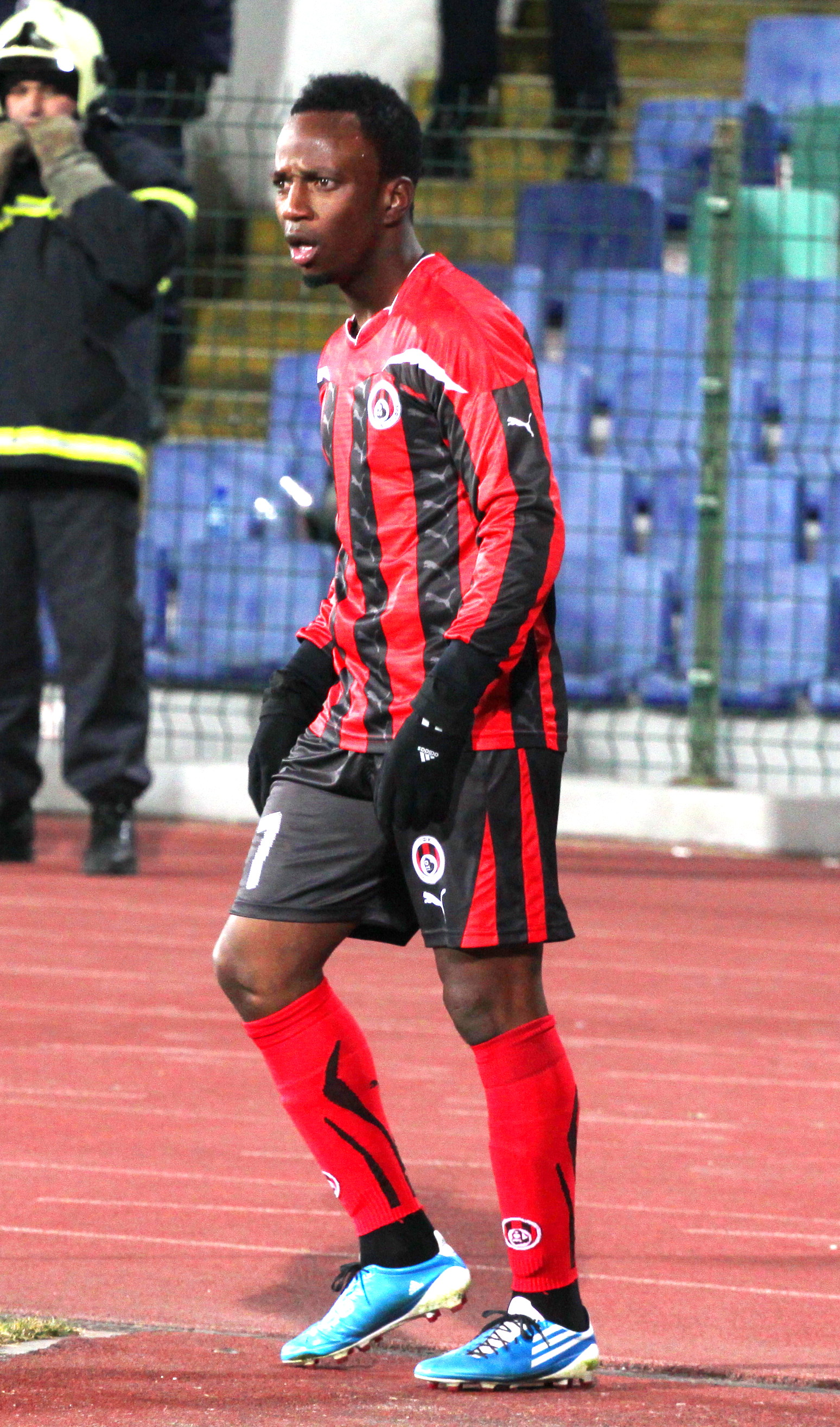
- Johnson as a Lokomotiv Sofia player in 2011.

Personal information
- Full name: Jemal Pierre Johnson
- Date of birth: May 3, 1985 (age 41)
- Place of birth: Paterson, New Jersey, United States
- Height: 1.83 m (6 ft 0 in)
- Positions: Winger; striker

Youth career
- Manchester United
- 2001–2004: Blackburn Rovers

Senior career*
Years	Team	Apps	(Gls)
2004–2006	Blackburn Rovers	6	(0)
2005	→ Preston North End (loan)	3	(1)
2006	→ Darlington (loan)	9	(3)
2006–2007	Wolverhampton Wanderers	20	(3)
2007	→ Leeds United (loan)	5	(0)
2007–2011	Milton Keynes Dons	96	(12)
2010	→ Stockport County (loan)	16	(2)
2010	→ Port Vale (loan)	6	(0)
2011	Lokomotiv Sofia	14	(1)
2011	Southend United	5	(0)
2012	Dover Athletic	10	(1)
2012	Tamworth	1	(0)
2013	Fort Lauderdale Strikers	12	(1)
2013–2014	New York Cosmos	20	(1)
2015–2017	Jacksonville Armada	74	(7)
2018–2019	Fresno FC	59	(16)
Total		356	(48)
- * Club domestic league appearances and goals

Jemal Pierre Johnson (born May 3, 1985) is an American former professional soccer player. In a 15-year career, he scored 53 goals in 391 league and cup appearances.

He started his career at Premier League club Blackburn Rovers, making several appearances for the club between 2004 and 2006, having graduated through the club's academy. After a season at Wolverhampton Wanderers, he joined Milton Keynes Dons in summer 2007. As well as these three clubs, he has also spent loan periods at Preston North End, Darlington, Leeds United, Stockport County, and Port Vale. He spent the first half of 2011 with the Bulgarian side Lokomotiv Sofia before returning to England in the summer to sign for Southend United; Southend released him in December 2011, and two months later signed with Dover Athletic. He joined Tamworth in September 2012. Having made one appearance for the club, he left Tamworth to return to the United States with the Fort Lauderdale Strikers. He went on to play for the New York Cosmos in the 2014 season, for Jacksonville Armada the following three seasons. Then he joined Fresno FC in January 2018.

== Career ==
=== Blackburn Rovers ===
Though born in the United States, Johnson's family moved to Macclesfield when he was five. Originally signed by Manchester United, Johnson joined Blackburn Rovers' Academy when he was 16.

Johnson made his first-team debut as a substitute in Rovers' FA Cup Third round 1–1 tie at Cardiff City on January 8, 2005, replacing Paul Dickov after 89 minutes. He scored his first senior goal, in his first start, on January 29 at Ewood Park, in Blackburn's fourth round 3–0 victory over Colchester United. He also played in the fifth round goalless draw with Burnley at Turf Moor, but played not further part in Rovers' semi-final run. He also made three substitute appearances in the Premier League during the 2004–05 season.

In October 2005, he joined Championship side Preston North End on loan, he played three games at Deepdale, scoring against Hull City. In March 2006 he joined League Two Darlington on a six-week loan, manager David Hodgson having tracked him since July 2004. Johnson scored three times in nine starts.

=== Wolverhampton Wanderers ===
Having failed to establish himself in the Rovers first-team, Johnson joined Championship club Wolverhampton Wanderers in August 2006 for an undisclosed fee. He scored two match-winning goals in his first two league games for the club – to the delight of manager Mick McCarthy, but by the end of the season he scored just one further goal. He joined Leeds United on a three-month loan in February 2007 but had a frustrating time at Elland Road, making just five appearances. Back at Molineux, he was placed on the transfer list.

=== Milton Keynes Dons ===
In August 2007, Paul Ince's Milton Keynes Dons paid an undisclosed fee for Johnson, and he signed a two-year contract. In his first season at the club, he scored some vital goals, including one against Swansea City to help get the Dons into the Football League Trophy final. He also played at Wembley in the final itself, as the Dons beat Grimsby Town 2–0 to lift the trophy. He also helped the club top the League Two table.

Johnson struck six times in 2008–09, as the Dons finished two points off an automatic promotion place in the Championship. He did not feature in the play-off encounter with eventual promotion winners Scunthorpe United. His contract ran out in May 2009; however, he re-signed with the club in July 2009, penning a new two-year deal after former Wolves player Paul Ince returned to the management post.

Despite starting the 2009–10 season well, scoring a hat-trick against Northampton Town in a pre-season friendly, he lost his first-team place in November. In January 2010, MK Dons announced that Johnson was to join League One Stockport County on loan for the remaining six months of the season, alongside teammates Jabo Ibehre, Danny Swailes and Richie Partridge. All four MK Dons players, plus Colchester United's David Perkins started for County against Swindon Town on January 19. He went on to score two goals in 16 appearances for Stockport during his loan spell, as the club dropped out of the league in bottom place – a whole 25 points from safety.

Johnson had trials with two Major League Soccer clubs in August 2010 – D.C. United and Kansas City Wizards, but neither club offered him a contract. New Zealand club Wellington Phoenix FC did offer him a contract, though nothing came of the offer. Back at Stadium MK he once again found himself on the bench. He joined Port Vale on a one-month loan in September 2010, manager Micky Adams intending to use the player on the wing following Lewis Haldane's injury and Abdulai Bell-Baggie's departure. Vale seemed to have extended Johnson's loan spell by a further month, however, his parent club recalled him at the last minute. In January 2011 Johnson left Milton Keynes Dons when his contract was terminated by mutual consent.

=== Lokomotiv Sofia ===
In January 2011, he rejected offers from English league clubs and instead moved to Bulgaria to play for top-flight side Lokomotiv Sofia. On 28 February, he made his first appearance for the "Railwaymen" in a 2–0 home win against Montana. He left the club by mutual consent in the summer following a fourth-place finish in the league.

=== Southend United ===
In July 2011, Johnson returned to England to sign a twelve-month contract (with an option to extend) with League Two side Southend United. He made two starts and five substitute appearances for the "Shrimpers" before October 28, when he was placed under police arrest for his alleged role in a fight outside a nightclub in Ilford. On November 30, Southend United confirmed that he was under a two-week club suspension whilst a "full review" into his actions took place. Three weeks later the club announced that he would be released.

=== Non-League football ===
In February 2012, he signed for Dover Athletic until the end of the season, having impressed impressing boss Nicky Forster on trial. He was not offered a contract at the end of the 2011–12 season however, and was released in May 2012.

Johnson joined Conference National side Tamworth on non-contract terms in September 2012. However, he played just 18 minutes as a substitute before leaving The Lamb Ground.

=== Fort Lauderdale Strikers ===
Johnson joined Fort Lauderdale Strikers of the North American Soccer League for the spring period of the 2013 season. On June 23, he played in an international friendly against Brazilian side Cruzeiro Esporte Clube in front of a season-high crowd at Lockhart Stadium.

=== New York Cosmos ===
In June 2013, it was confirmed by the New York Cosmos and their head coach Giovanni Savarese that Johnson would be playing for them starting in the fall period of the 2013 season. During the Cosmos' pre-season tour of England Johnson suffered a knee injury against Leyton Orient, ruling him out of action for the beginning of the fall season. He made his Cosmos' debut on November 2, playing 18 minutes as a substitute in a 1–0 win over the Atlanta Silverbacks. Due to his knee injury, this was the only action Johnson saw in the 2013 campaign.

In 2014, Johnson was a regular contributor to the Cosmos attack. On 26 July, he scored his first goal for the Cosmos in a 1–1 draw with his former club, Fort Lauderdale Strikers. Playing primarily on the left wing, Johnson had one goal and two assists in 19 appearances during the 2014 NASL regular season.

=== Jacksonville Armada ===
In December 2014, Johnson made the move to the newly formed NASL club Jacksonville Armada. He scored the first goal of the opening game of the 2015 regular season, which in addition to making him Armada's first competitive goalscorer, his strike at 12 seconds into the game set the modern-era NASL record for fastest goal. He ended the 2015 season with five goals in 29 matches. He scored two goals in 24 appearances across the 2016 season. The 2017 season would be his last at Hodges Stadium, and he played 24 games without scoring a goal for Mark Lowry's "Boys in Blue".

=== Fresno ===
On January 18, 2018, Johnson signed a one-year contract with newly formed United Soccer League side Fresno FC. He scored nine goals in 30 games during the 2018 season as head coach Adam Smith led the team to a 12th-place finish. He scored seven goals in 33 games in the 2019 season; Fresno reached the Conference Quarterfinals, where they were beaten 3–2 by El Paso Locomotive FC at Chukchansi Park.

== Style of play ==
Johnson is a fast player who is effective in one-on-one situations and capable of scoring from long range.

== Career statistics ==
Appearances and goals by club, season and competition
Club	Season	League			National cup (Note: Includes FA Cup, Bulgarian Cup, U.S. Open Cup)		League cup (Note: Includes Football League Cup)		Other		Total	
Club	Season	Division	Apps	Goals	Apps	Goals	Apps	Goals	Apps	Goals	Apps	Goals
Blackburn Rovers	2004–05	Premier League	3	0	3	1	0	0	—		6	1
Blackburn Rovers	2005–06	Premier League	3	0	1	0	0	0	—		4	0
Blackburn Rovers	Total		6	0	4	1	0	0	0	0	10	1
Preston North End (loan)	2005–06	Championship	3	1	0	0	—		—		3	1
Darlington (loan)	2005–06	League Two	9	3	—		—		—		9	3
Wolverhampton Wanderers	2006–07	Championship	20	3	3	0	1	0	—		24	3
Leeds United (loan)	2006–07	Championship	5	0	—		—		—		5	0
Milton Keynes Dons	2007–08	League Two	39	5	1	1	—		6 (Note: Appearance(s) in EFL Trophy)	2	46	8
Milton Keynes Dons	2008–09	League One	33	5	1	1	2	0	1	0	37	6
Milton Keynes Dons	2009–10	League One	17	1	0	0	1	0	2	0	20	1
Milton Keynes Dons	2010–11	League One	7	1	2	0	0	0	0	0	9	1
Milton Keynes Dons	Total		96	12	4	2	3	0	9	2	112	16
Stockport County (loan)	2009–10	League One	16	2	—		—		—		16	2
Port Vale (loan)	2010–11	League Two	6	0	0	0	—		1	0	7	0
Lokomotiv Sofia	2010–11	A PFG	14	1	0	0	—		0	0	14	1
Southend United	2011–12	League Two	5	0	0	0	1	0	1	0	7	0
Dover Athletic	2011–12	Conference South	10	1	0	0	—		0	0	10	1
Tamworth	2012–13	Conference National	1	0	0	0	—		0	0	1	0
Fort Lauderdale Strikers	2013	North American Soccer League	12	1	0	0	—		—		12	1
New York Cosmos	2013	North American Soccer League	1	0	0	0	—		—		1	0
New York Cosmos	2014	North American Soccer League	19	1	1	0	—		—		20	1
New York Cosmos	Total		20	1	1	0	—		—		21	1
Jacksonville Armada	2015	North American Soccer League	28	5	1	0	—		—		29	5
Jacksonville Armada	2016	North American Soccer League	24	2	0	0	—		—		24	2
Jacksonville Armada	2017	North American Soccer League	22	0	2	0	—		—		24	0
Jacksonville Armada	Total		74	7	3	0	—		—		77	7
Fresno	2018	United Soccer League	28	9	2	0	—		—		30	9
Fresno	2019	USL Championship	31	7	2	0	—		—		33	7
Fresno	Total		59	16	4	0	—		—		63	16
Career total			356	48	19	3	5	0	11	2	391	53

== Honors ==
Milton Keynes Dons

- Football League Two: 2007–08
- Football League Trophy: 2007–08

New York Cosmos

- North American Soccer League: 2013
