= Edison Bilbao =

Chilean footballer (born 1987)

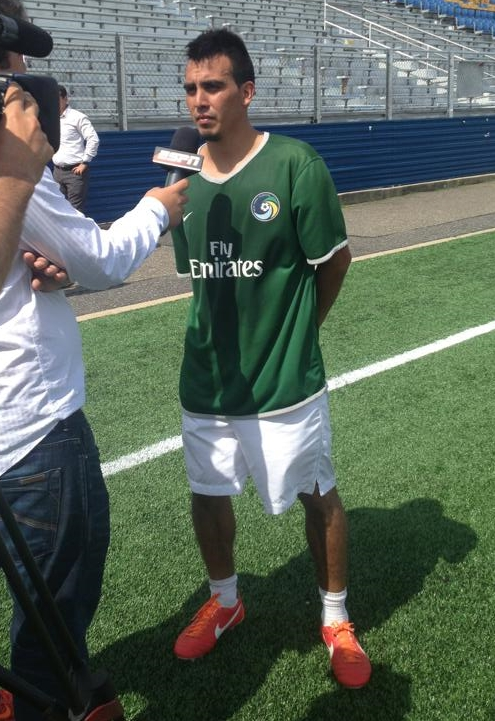

Personal information
- Full name: Édison David Bilbao Zárate
- Date of birth: 3 June 1987 (age 39)
- Place of birth: Santiago, Chile
- Position: Midfielder

Youth career
- Colo-Colo
- New York MetroStars

Senior career*
Years	Team	Apps	(Gls)
2007	Newark Ironbound Express		
2007–2008	New Jersey Ironmen (indoor)		
2008	Torpedo Moscow		
2008–2009	Murça SC		
2009	Mondinense	3	(0)
2010	Montalegre	7	(2)
2011	União Leiria		
2011–2012	Ramonense		
2012–2013	Qormi	27	(6)
2013–2014	New York Cosmos	1	(0)
2014–2015	Balzan	61	(4)
2016–2017	Birkirkara	12	(1)
2016–2017	→ Għajnsielem (loan)		
2017	Mosta	14	(0)
2018–2019	Gżira United	35	(4)
2019	Santiago Morning		
2020	Gudja United	7	(0)
2021	Tarxien Rainbows	13	(0)
- * Club domestic league appearances and goals

Édison David Bilbao Zárate (born 3 June 1987), known as Edison Bilbao, is a Chilean former professional footballer who played as a midfielder.

== Early life ==
Born in Santiago, Chile, Bilbao moved to the United States at the age of eleven, making his home in Newark, New Jersey.

== Career ==
As a youth player, Bilbao was with Colo-Colo in his homeland and New York MetroStars in the United States. In colo-Colo, he coincided with players such as Arturo Vidal, Felipe Flores and Juan Pablo Arenas. After stints with Newark Ironbound Express and New Jersey Ironmen, he moved outside the United States and has played for clubs in Russia, Portugal, Costa Rica, Malta and Chile. In the Maltese football, he coincided with his compatriots Francisco Arriagada and Juan Manuel Artiaga.

== Personal life ==
His twin brother, Jonathan, also has played football and studied along with him.

== Honours ==
New York Cosmos

- NASL: 2013
