= Toni Ståhl =

Finnish footballer (born 1985)

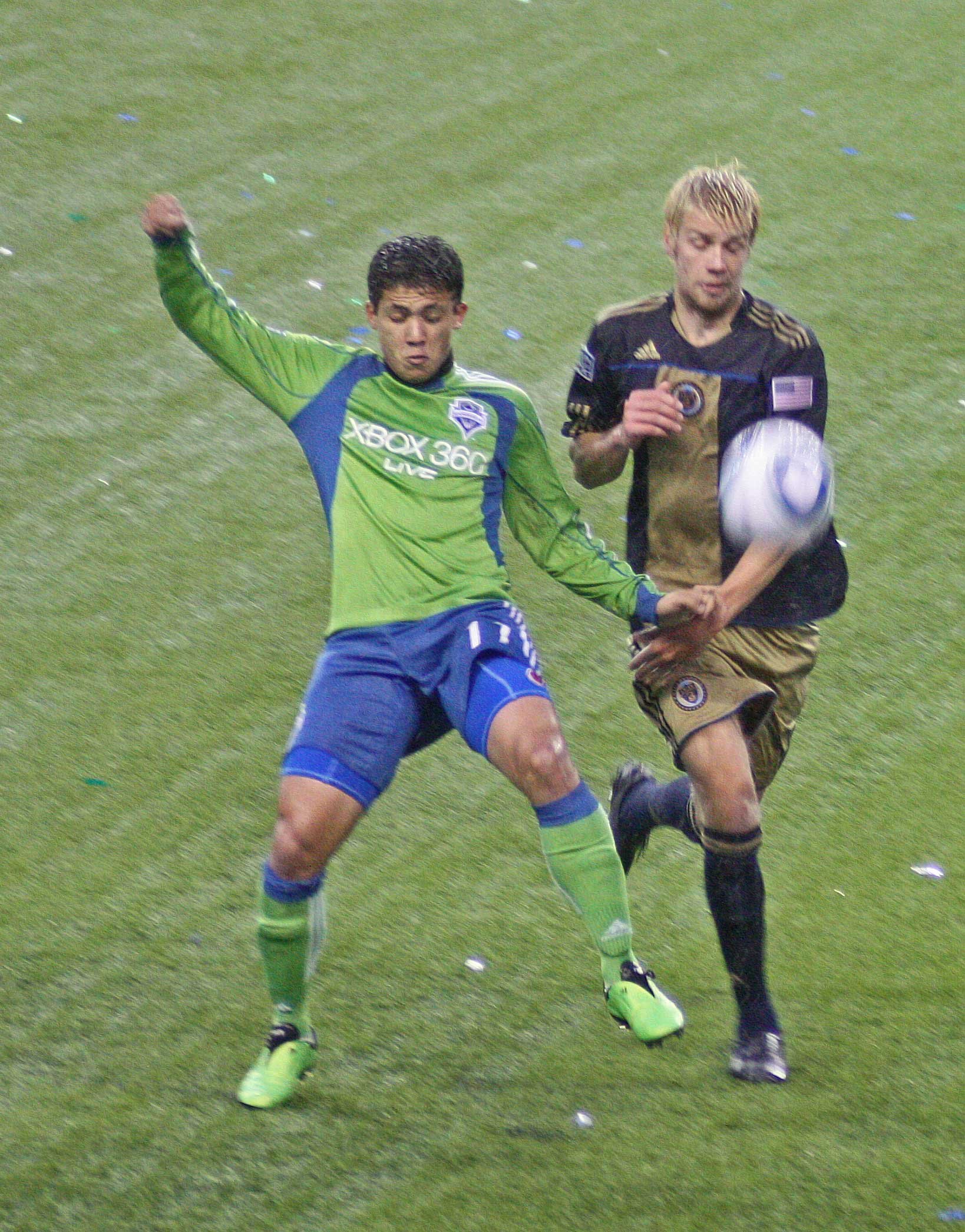
- Toni Ståhl (right) versus Fredy Montero

Personal information
- Full name: Toni Ståhl
- Date of birth: 11 May 1985 (age 41)
- Place of birth: Tuusula, Finland
- Height: 6 ft 3 in (1.91 m)
- Positions: Defender; defensive midfielder

Youth career
- –2002: HJK Helsinki
- 2006–2009: Connecticut Huskies

Senior career*
Years	Team	Apps	(Gls)
2002	Atlantis A	4	(0)
2003–2006	FC Espoo	26	(6)
2010	Philadelphia Union	1	(0)
2010	→ Harrisburg City Islanders (loan)	1	(0)
2011–2013	Fort Lauderdale Strikers	64	(0)
2014	Carolina RailHawks	6	(0)
- * Club domestic league appearances and goals as of 21 July 2014

Toni Ståhl (born 11 May 1985) is a Finnish footballer who last played for Carolina RailHawks in the North American Soccer League.

== Career ==
=== Early career in Finland ===
Ståhl attended high school at Pohjois-Haagan Yhteiskoulu, and was part of the youth teams of the most successful Finnish club of all time, HJK Helsinki. After his time at HJK, he had a short spell with the Second Division team Atlantis Akatemia in late 2002, before joining FC Espoo in 2003.

=== American college career ===
Ståhl accepted an invitation from the University of Connecticut to play college soccer in the United States, and he joined the Connecticut Huskies for the 2006 season. He was chosen as the Big East Rookie of the Year after his first season with the Huskies, after being the only freshman to start and play in all 19 games that season. In 2009, he was named Big East Midfielder of the Year as he concluded his career with the Huskies tallying two goals and nine assists. He was also a nominee in the semifinal stage for the M.A.C. Hermann Trophy.

=== Professional ===
In December 2009, Ståhl signed a contract with Major League Soccer, even though clubs from Sweden, Denmark and English Premier League club Burnley showed interest in him.

Ståhl was subsequently drafted in the second round (17th overall) of the 2010 MLS SuperDraft by Philadelphia Union. He was sent off on his MLS debut on 25 March 2010, in a game against Seattle Sounders FC. In April 2010 he played on loan with the Union's USL-2 affiliate Harrisburg City Islanders.

On 14 January 2011, the Union announced that they declined the option on Ståhl's contract and he subsequently became a free agent.

Ståhl signed with Fort Lauderdale Strikers of the North American Soccer League on 1 April 2011. Following an impressive debut season for the Strikers, Ståhl was named to the NASL 2011 Best XI Team as one of four defenders.

== Career statistics ==
As of 29 May 2013

Club	Season	League	League		Cup		Playoffs		Continental		Total	
Club	Season	League	Apps	Goals	Apps	Goals	Apps	Goals	Apps	Goals	Apps	Goals
Philadelphia Union	2010	MLS	1	0	0	0	—	—	—	—	1	0
Harrisburg City Islanders (loan)	2010	USL-2	1	0	0	0	—	—	—	—	1	0
Fort Lauderdale Strikers	2011	NASL	22	0	—	—	5	0	—	—	27	0
Fort Lauderdale Strikers	2012	NASL	21	0	1	0	1	0	0	0	23	0
Fort Lauderdale Strikers	2013	NASL	4	0	—	—	—	—	—	—	4	0
Career total			49	0	1	0	6	0	0	0	56	0
