= Carlos Salazar (Colombian footballer) =

Colombian footballer (born 1981)

Personal information
- Full name: Carlos Eduardo Salazar Paz
- Date of birth: 1 July 1981 (age 45)
- Place of birth: Cali, Colombia
- Height: 1.75 m (5 ft 9 in)
- Position: Midfielder

Senior career*
Years	Team	Apps	(Gls)
2000–2004	Deportivo Cali	29	(5)
2002–2003	→ Deportivo Pasto (loan)	40	(3)
2004	→ Cortuluá (loan)	18	(2)
2005	Atlético Bucaramanga	16	(4)
2005–2006	Deportivo Pereira	23	(2)
2006	Alajuelense	21	(8)
2007	Deportivo Pasto	8	(0)
2007	Zamora	23	(6)
2008	Colo-Colo	13	(2)
2008–2009	Atlético Huila	16	(1)
2009–2010	Mes Rafsanjan	27	(14)
2011	Mes Kerman	3	(0)
2012	Deportivo Pereira	10	(2)
2012	Tauro	13	(1)
2013–2014	Fort Lauderdale Strikers	21	(5)
2014	Unión Magdalena	19	(3)
2015	Miami Fusion		
2016	Juticalpa	0	(0)
2017	Universitario Popayán	8	(0)

International career
2003	Colombia U23	17	(3)
- * Club domestic league appearances and goals

Carlos Eduardo Salazar Paz (born 1 July 1981) is a Colombian retired football player who played as a midfielder. He has played for teams in Colombia, Costa Rica, Venezuela, Chile, Iran and the United States.

== Club career ==
=== Colo-Colo ===
On 1 February 2008, Salazar was signed by Colo-Colo. Salazar made his debut against Universidad de Concepción as a starter, scoring the only goal of the match at the 42 minute mark. He made his debut appearance in the Copa Libertadores by playing a match against Atlas, in which Colo-Colo lost 0–3. With the arrival of Fernando Astengo, Salazar was dropped from the team.

=== Mes Rafsanjan ===
He returned to Venezuela to play in Aragua and Atlético Huila. During 2009, he was on trial in Real Salt Lake of Major League Soccer, but was unable to pass the test. In June, Salazar completed his move to the Iranian Second Division side Mes Rafsanjan. He played 15 matches (League and Hafzi Cup) and scored 13 goals.

=== Mes Kerman ===
After his regular pass in Rafsanjan, he signed a 2-year contract with Sanat Mes Kerman FC in the Premier league of Iran, but was fired on 22 December 2011.

=== Fort Lauderdale Strikers ===
On 25 March 2013 the Fort Lauderdale Strikers announced that Salazar had signed with the club following a successful preseason with them.

=== Unión Magdalena ===
Salazar signed with Unión Magdalena after mutually terminating his contract with Fort Lauderdale.
