= Stefan Dimitrov (footballer) =

Bulgarian footballer

Personal information
- Full name: Stefan Ivanov Dimitrov
- Date of birth: October 8, 1984 (age 42)
- Place of birth: Veliko Tarnovo, PR Bulgaria
- Height: 6 ft 1 in (1.85 m)
- Position: Forward

Youth career
- Etar Veliko Tarnovo

College career
Years	Team	Apps	(Gls)
2006–2008	Concordia Clippers		

Senior career*
Years	Team	Apps	(Gls)
2001–2005	Etar Veliko Tarnovo	7	(2)
2009–2010	Chicago Fire	12	(0)
2011	New York Pancyprian-Freedoms		
2012	Brooklyn Knights	7	(8)
2013–2014	New York Cosmos	26	(3)
2013	→ Fort Lauderdale Strikers (loan)	7	(0)
- * Club domestic league appearances and goals as of October 31, 2014

Stefan Dimitrov (born October 8, 1984, in Veliko Tarnovo) is a Bulgarian footballer.

== Career ==
=== Early career in Bulgaria ===
Dimitrov spent his early career in his native Bulgaria. Raise in the youth teams of his hometown club, Etar Veliko Tarnovo, he made his debut with Etar's first team at the age of 16. Dimitrov subsequently played four seasons with Etar in the Bulgarian B Group prior to his move to the United States. He played sparingly for Etar, appearing in 4 league matches during the 2003–04 season and three league matches during the 2004–05 season.

=== College ===
When Dimitrov's father won the green card lottery, the family relocated to New York City. Dimitrov played with an amateur Bulgarian team in Queens, New York before enrolling in and playing college soccer for Concordia College. Dimitrov was the leading scorer in the NCAA Division II Men's Soccer 2008 regular season with 23 goals in 17 games. He was also named to the 2008 Daktronics NCAA Division II Men's Soccer All-America Second Team and named the 2008 East Coast Conference Offensive Player of the Year.

=== Professional ===
Dimitrov was signed by Chicago Fire in March 2009, after being invited to try out with the team by head coach Denis Hamlett. He made his MLS debut on 13 June 2009, as a late substitute in a game against D.C. United.

Dimitrov was released by Chicago on August 27, 2010. He played for the New York Pancyprian-Freedoms in the US Open Cup in 2011, before signing for New York Cosmos U-23 in 2011 and was selected as one of the U-23 players to participate in the Paul Scholes testimonial match between New York Cosmos and Manchester United.

On January 31, 2013, Dimitrov signed with the Cosmos for their inaugural season in the NASL. Two months later, he was loaned out to Fort Lauderdale Strikers for the Spring season.
