= Manny González (soccer) =

Colombian-American soccer player

Personal information
- Full name: Manuel González
- Date of birth: June 3, 1990 (age 36)
- Place of birth: Tulua, Colombia
- Height: 1.75 m (5 ft 9 in)
- Position: Midfielder

Team information
- Current team: Tulsa Athletic

College career
Years	Team	Apps	(Gls)
2008–2009	Florida Gulf Coast Eagles	27	(5)

Senior career*
Years	Team	Apps	(Gls)
2008	Palm Beach Pumas	11	(0)
2009	Austin Aztex U23	14	(0)
2009–2010	La Equidad	0	(0)
2011	Fort Lauderdale Schulz Academy	12	(1)
2013–2016	Fort Lauderdale Strikers	53	(0)
2017	South Florida Surf	6	(0)
2017	Mississippi Brilla	0	(0)
2018	Miami FC 2	10	(0)
2019	Tulsa Roughnecks	29	(0)
2020	Oakland Roots	2	(0)
2022–2024	Maryland Bobcats	47	(2)
2025–	Tulsa Athletic	0	(0)
- * Club domestic league appearances and goals as of March 20, 2025

Manny González (born June 3, 1990) is a Colombian-American soccer player who plays for Tulsa Athletic.

== Career ==
González spent the 2012 season with the Strikers as a practice player. He signed with the club ahead of the 2013 season on January 31, 2013.

González made his professional debut on May 11, 2013, against Minnesota United FC. He started and played the whole match and provided the assist on the game-winning goal in the 2–1 victory.

In January 2020, González joined Oakland Roots SC of the National Independent Soccer Association. Two years later, he joined Maryland Bobcats FC.

In 2025 González joined Tulsa Athletic ahead of the club's participation in the 2025 U.S. Open Cup.
