= Rubens Pinheiro =

Brazilian association football player

Rubens
Personal information
- Date of birth: 12 October 1989 (age 37)
- Place of birth: São Paulo, Brazil
- Height: 1.88 m (6 ft 2 in)
- Position: Midfielder

Youth career
- 2004–2006: Corinthians
- 2007: Benespa

Senior career*
Years	Team	Apps	(Gls)
- Grêmio Esportivo Osasco
- Red Bull Brasil
2011	Operário	20	(0)
2013	Fort Lauderdale Strikers	7	(0)
- * Club domestic league appearances and goals as of 7 April 2013

Rubens Pinheiro (born 12 October 1989 in São Paulo) is a Brazilian footballer who most recently played as a midfielder for the Fort Lauderdale Strikers in the North American Soccer League.

== Career ==
=== Early career ===
Pinheiro started his footballing career at the youth Academy of Sport Club Corinthians Paulista in 2004 where he stayed till 2006 when he joined Benespa in 2007. He then went on to create a career at the lower levels of the Brazilian footballing pyramid with Grêmio Esportivo Osasco, Red Bull Brasil, and most recently Operário Futebol Clube (MS).

=== Fort Lauderdale Strikers ===
On 21 March 2013 it was officially announced that Pinheiro had signed with the Fort Lauderdale Strikers of the North American Soccer League. On 6 April 2013 Pinheiro made his debut for the Strikers against FC Edmonton in which he started and played 65 minutes as the strikers drew the match 1–1.

== Career statistics ==
=== Club ===
Statistics accurate as of 7 April 2013

Club	Season	League		US Open Cup		Other		CONCACAF		Total	
Club	Season	Apps	Goals	Apps	Goals	Apps	Goals	Apps	Goals	Apps	Goals
Fort Lauderdale Strikers	2013	1	0	0	0	0	0	—	—	1	0
Career total		1	0	0	0	0	0	0	0	1	0
