= Martin Nuñez =

Uruguayan footballer (born 1987)

Martín Núñez
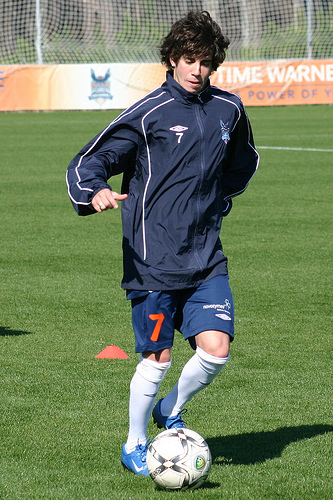

Personal information
- Full name: Pablo Martín Núñez
- Date of birth: February 2, 1987 (age 39)
- Place of birth: Montevideo, Uruguay
- Height: 5 ft 6 in (1.68 m)
- Position: Attacking midfielder

Youth career
- 2006: GPC Jaguars

Senior career*
Years	Team	Apps	(Gls)
2008	Carolina RailHawks	28	(5)
2009	Puerto Rico Islanders	14	(1)
2010–2011	Fort Lauderdale Strikers	31	(5)
2012	Minnesota Stars FC	25	(5)
2013–2014	Fort Lauderdale Strikers	40	(11)
2015	Tampa Bay Rowdies	16	(3)
- * Club domestic league appearances and goals as of November 14, 2015

Martín Núñez (born February 2, 1987, in Montevideo) is a Uruguayan footballer.

== Career ==
=== Youth and college ===
Núñez moved with his family to the United States when he was nine years old, settling in Miami, Florida. He attended Miami Sunset Senior High School, with whom he won the Florida State 6A championship in both 2004 and 2005, was named a first team All State in 2005, and was recognized as the Miami Herald Florida Player of the Year class 6A, the Florida State Final Four MVP and the Miami Herald Player of the Year as he led the team with thirty-four goals.

Núñez played college soccer at Georgia Perimeter College where he was a 2006 second team National Junior College All American, leading the nation with thirty goals. He left school after his freshman year to pursue a professional career.

=== Professional ===
Núñez was drafted in the second round (22nd overall) of the 2007 USL College Player Draft by Miami FC, but he chose not to sign with the team. In 2008, he was offered a contract with the New York Red Bulls of Major League Soccer, but again he chose to not sign with them; instead, he signed with the Carolina RailHawks of the USL First Division on March 15, 2008. He immediately cemented a spot in the RailHawks' midfield, playing twenty-eight games and scoring five goals. His efforts were rewarded when he was named one of three finalists for the Rookie of the Year award, an award ultimately won by Osvaldo Alonso.

In January 2009, Núñez traveled to Puerto Rico to join the Puerto Rico Islanders of the USL-1 at their training camp on trial, signing with the club on February 18. He went on to play 14 games for the Islanders in 2009, helping them to the final of the 2009 CFU Club Championship, before being released at the end of the season.

He signed for Miami FC of the USSF Division 2 Professional League in 2010 and re-signed with the club, now called Fort Lauderdale Strikers and playing in the North American Soccer League, on February 8, 2011.

On March 6, 2012, Nuñez was traded to Minnesota Stars FC by the Strikers in exchange for Jack Stewart.

Nuñez was let go by Minnesota Stars FC after the 2012 season and went on trial with FC Edmonton. Edmonton declined to sign him.

In August 2013, Nuñez again signed with Fort Lauderdale Strikers. He remained with the club through the end of 2014.

Nuñez signed with Tampa Bay Rowdies in December 2014. He was released in November 2015.

== Honors ==
=== Puerto Rico Islanders ===
- CFU Club Championship Runner-up (1): 2009
