= 2011 Atlanta Silverbacks season =

Atlanta Silverbacks
2011 season
- Owners: Boris Jerkunica; John Latham
- Head coach: José Manuel Abundis
- Stadium: Atlanta Silverbacks Park
- NASL: 8th
- Playoffs: Did not qualify
- U.S. Open Cup: Denied entry
- Top goalscorer: Matt Horth (6)
- Highest home attendance: 3,543 vs. MIN (Apr 9, 2011)
- Lowest home attendance: 2,328 vs. CAR (June 25, 2011)
- Average home league attendance: 2,866
Home colors	Away colors

The 2011 Atlanta Silverback season was the club's fifteenth year of existence, and their first year in the North American Soccer League (NASL). It's the team's first year back after a two-year hiatus from competitive play.

On January 25, the Silverbacks announced their full schedule in the NASL. The Silverbacks will host each NASL opponent twice over the course of the season.

On March 8, the Silverbacks announced three preseason games against Southern Polytechnic State University, Georgia State University and Clayton State University. All three games resulted in a scoreless tie.

== Background ==
The 2011 season marked the Silverbacks return to American soccer following a two-year hiatus, that did not see the organization field a senior men's team throughout the 2009 and 2010 seasons.

== Review ==
The return season was arguably an abysmal campaign for the Silverbacks, as the club lost 20 of its 28 regular season matches, drawing and winning four matches apiece. During the regular season, the Silverbacks were mathematically eliminated from playoff contention with seven weeks left in the NASL regular season. José Manuel Abundis, then the head coach, was fired following the season replaced by then-assistant coach, Alex Pineda Chacón, whom played for the Silverbacks from 2003 to 2004. The announcement came on November 7, 2011.

== Club ==
=== Roster ===
Note: Flags indicate national team as defined under FIFA eligibility rules; some limited exceptions apply. Players may hold more than one non-FIFA nationality.

No.	Pos.	Nation	Player
1	GK	MEX	Felipe Quintero
2	DF	USA	Tyler Ruthven
3	DF	USA	Shane Moroney
4	DF	USA	Patrick Robertson
5	MF	USA	Ciaran O'Brien
6	MF	USA	Jordan Davis
7	MF	USA	Jose Parada
10	MF	ARG	Lucas Paulini
12	MF	PUR	Fernando González
13	DF	USA	Willie Hunt
14	MF	USA	Nico Colaluca
14	DF	MEX	Mario Pérez Zúñiga

No.	Pos.	Nation	Player
15	DF	JPN	Kohei Matsushita
16	DF	USA	Josh Casarona
17	MF	LBR	Moussa Toure
18	FW	USA	Matt Horth
19	MF	SCO	Grant Kerr
20	GK	USA	Jimmy Maurer
21	MF	USA	Raphael Cox
22	FW	USA	Jon Cox
23	DF	SUI	Mattias Schnorf
25	FW	USA	Conor Chinn
26	GK	USA	Eric Ati

=== Technical Staff ===
- (Mexico) José Manuel Abundis – Head Coach
- (Honduras) Alex Pineda Chacón – Assistant Coach
- (Brazil) José Pinho – Goalkeeper Coach
- (Chile) Rodrigo Rios – Director of Soccer

== Competitions ==
=== Preseason ===
March 23, 2011	Atlanta Silverbacks	0–0	Southern Polytechnic State University	Atlanta
16:30 EDT		Report		Stadium: Atlanta Silverbacks Park

March 26, 2011	Georgia State University	0–0	Atlanta Silverbacks	Atlanta
16:30 EDT		Report

March 30, 2011	Atlanta Silverbacks	0–0	Clayton State University	Atlanta
16:30 EDT		Report		Stadium: Atlanta Silverbacks Park

=== NASL ===
==== Standings ====
Pos	Team	Pld	W	D	L	GF	GA	GD	Pts	Qualification
4	Fort Lauderdale Strikers	28	9	11	8	35	36	−1	38	Playoff quarterfinals
5	FC Edmonton	28	10	6	12	35	40	−5	36 (Note: EDM: 8 pts; MIN: 2 pts)	Playoff quarterfinals
6	NSC Minnesota Stars (C)	28	9	9	10	30	32	−2	36	Playoff quarterfinals
7	Montreal Impact	28	9	8	11	35	27	+8	35	
8	Atlanta Silverbacks	28	4	4	20	25	63	−38	16	

Source: NASL Standings
Rules for classification: 1) points; 2) head-to-head record; 3) goal difference; 4) number of goals scored.
(C) Champions

==== Results summary ====
Overall								Home						Away					
Pld	W	D	L	GF	GA	GD	Pts	W	D	L	GF	GA	GD	W	D	L	GF	GA	GD
28	4	4	20	25	63	−38	16	3	1	10	14	32	−18	1	3	10	11	31	−20

Last updated: September 22, 2012.
Source: Match results

==== Results by round ====
Round	1	2	3	4	5	6	7	8	9	10	11	12	13	14	15	16	17	18	19	20	21	22	23	24	25	26	27	28
Stadium	H	H	H	A	H	A	H	A	H	H	A	A	H	H	A	A	H	A	H	A	A	A	H	H	A	A	A	H
Result	L	L	L	D	L	L	D	L	L	W	L	L	L	L	W	D	W	L	L	L	L	L	L	W	L	L	D	L

Source: Match results
A = Away; H = Home; W = Win; D = Draw; L = Loss

==== Match results ====
April 9, 2011 1	Atlanta Silverbacks	1–2	NSC Minnesota Stars	Atlanta
7:30 PM ET	Horth 64'	Report	Takada 57'; Gotsmanov 90'	Stadium: Atlanta Silverbacks Park; Attendance: 3,543

April 16, 2011 2	Atlanta Silverbacks	0–1	FC Edmonton	Atlanta
7:30 PM ET		Report	Surprenant 11'	Stadium: Atlanta Silverbacks Park; Attendance: 3,161

April 23, 2011 3	Atlanta Silverbacks	1–2	Fort Lauderdale Strikers	Atlanta
7:30 PM ET	Pérez 16'	Report	Nuñez 14'; Coudet 87' (pen.)	Stadium: Atlanta Silverbacks Park; Attendance: 3,227

April 30, 2011 4	FC Tampa Bay	1–1	Atlanta Silverbacks	St. Petersburg, Florida
7:00 PM ET	Ambersley 74'	Report	Hunt 45'	Stadium: Progress Energy Park; Attendance: 3,021

May 7, 2011 5	Atlanta Silverbacks	0–2	FC Edmonton	Atlanta
7:30 PM ET		Report	Craig 69'; Porter 76'	Stadium: Atlanta Silverbacks Park; Attendance: 2,433

May 14, 2011 6	NSC Minnesota Stars	3–0	Atlanta Silverbacks	Blaine, Minnesota
7:30 PM CT	Cosgriff 17'; Hlavaty 57' (pen.); Rodríguez 66'	Report		Stadium: NSC Stadium; Attendance: 963

May 21, 2011 7	Atlanta Silverbacks	0–0	Fort Lauderdale Strikers	Atlanta
7:30 PM ET		Report		Stadium: Atlanta Silverbacks Park; Attendance: 2,764

May 28, 2011 8	Carolina RailHawks	2–0	Atlanta Silverbacks	Cary, North Carolina
	Pablo Campos 81'; Russell 90'	Report		Stadium: WakeMed Soccer Park; Attendance: 3,015

June 4, 2011 9	Atlanta Silverbacks	0–2	NSC Minnesota Stars	Atlanta
7:30 PM ET		Report	Del Do 3', 64'	Stadium: Atlanta Silverbacks Park; Attendance: 2,447

June 8, 2011 10	Atlanta Silverbacks	2–1	Montreal Impact	Atlanta
7:30 PM ET	R. Cox 13'; Horth 34'	Report	Diouf 43'	Stadium: Atlanta Silverbacks Park; Attendance: 2,880

June 12, 2011 11	FC Tampa Bay	3–2	Atlanta Silverbacks	St. Petersburg, Florida
6:00 PM ET	Ambersley 31', 54'; King 86'	Report	Hunt 34'; Davis 64'	Stadium: Progress Energy Park; Attendance: 2,319

June 19, 2011 12	Puerto Rico Islanders	3–1	Atlanta Silverbacks	Bayamón, Puerto Rico
	Faña 2'; Hansen 81'; Foley 90'	Report	Paulini 45'	Stadium: Estadio Juan Ramón Loubriel; Attendance: 1,377

June 25, 2011 13	Atlanta Silverbacks	1–5	Carolina RailHawks	Atlanta
7:30 PM ET	Horth 10'	Report	Barbara 21'; Zimmerman 29', 63'; Nurse 36'; Rusin 88'	Stadium: Atlanta Silverbacks Park; Attendance: 2,328

July 4, 2011 14	Atlanta Silverbacks	3–4	Puerto Rico Islanders	Atlanta
5:00 PM ET	Ciaran O'Brien 32' (pen.), 54' (pen.); Sandoval 59'	Report	Pitchkolan 27'; Bouraee 38'; Foley 65' (pen.); Faña 90'	Stadium: Atlanta Silverbacks Park

July 9, 2011 15	Fort Lauderdale Strikers	2–3	Atlanta Silverbacks	Fort Lauderdale, Florida
7:30 PM ET	Thompson 7'; Arguez 74'	Report	Paulini 17'; O'Brien 32'; Horth 63'	Stadium: Lockhart Stadium; Attendance: 2,661

July 17, 2011 16	Montreal Impact	2–2	Atlanta Silverbacks	Montreal
3:30 PM ET	Sebrango 42', 90'	Report	Horth 17', 64'	Stadium: Saputo Stadium; Attendance: 10,077

July 23, 2011 17	Atlanta Silverbacks	2–1	FC Tampa Bay	Atlanta
7:30 PM ET	Sandoval 7'; O'Brien 41'	Report	King 43'	Stadium: Atlanta Silverbacks Park; Attendance: 3,515

July 30, 2011 18	Carolina RailHawks	1–0	Atlanta Silverbacks	Cary, North Carolina
7:00 PM EST	Barbara 8'	Report		Stadium: WakeMed Soccer Park; Attendance: 5,011

August 6, 2011 19	Atlanta Silverbacks	0–4	FC Tampa Bay	Atlanta
7:30 PM ET		Report	Savage 28', 60'; Ambersley 33'; Clare 82'	Stadium: Atlanta Silverbacks Park; Attendance: 3,126

August 10, 2011 20	Puerto Rico Islanders	2–0	Atlanta Silverbacks	Bayamón, Puerto Rico
7:30 PM ET	Foley 26'; Villaroel 66'	Report		Stadium: Estadio Juan Ramón Loubriel; Attendance: 1,182

August 14, 2011 21	Montreal Impact	4–0	Atlanta Silverbacks	Montreal
6:00 PM ET	Ilcu 3'; Camara 8'; Ubiparipovic 35'; Diouf 80'	Report		Stadium: Saputo Stadium; Attendance: 11,136

August 21, 2011 22	FC Edmonton	3–0	Atlanta Silverbacks	Edmonton, Alberta
9:30 ET	Saiko 63'; M. Cox 71', 76'	Report		Stadium: Foote Field; Attendance: 1,607

August 27, 2011 23	Atlanta Silverbacks	2–4	Carolina RailHawks	Atlanta
7:30 PM ET	Hunt 26'; R. Cox 76'	Report	Barbara 28', 79' (pen.), 90' (pen.); McManus 76'	Stadium: Atlanta Silverbacks Park; Attendance: 3,313

September 3, 2011 24	Atlanta Silverbacks	2–0	Puerto Rico Islanders	Atlanta
7:30 PM ET	Matt Horth 28', 30'	Report		Stadium: Atlanta Silverbacks Park

September 7, 2011 25	FC Edmonton	2–1	Atlanta Silverbacks	Edmonton, Alberta
	Yamada 52' (yellow card) 90+4'; Craig 90+3'	Report	Robertson (red card) 29'; Josh Casarona (yellow card) 58'; Ruthven 75'; Hunt (yellow card) 88'	Stadium: Foote Field; Attendance: 1,868

September 10, 2011 26	NSC Minnesota Stars	2–0	Atlanta Silverbacks	Blaine, Minnesota
8:30 PM ET	Cosgriff 12' Kallman (yellow card) 15'; Takada (yellow card) 63' Altman 84' (pen.)	Report	Hunt (yellow card) 72'; O'Brien (yellow card) 80'	Stadium: NSC Stadium; Attendance: 2,435

September 17, 2011 27	Fort Lauderdale Strikers	1–1	Atlanta Silverbacks	Fort Lauderdale, Florida
7:30 PM ET	Morales (yellow card) 62' Stahl (yellow card) 68'; Gordon (yellow card) 78' Shriver 90+1'	Report	Colaluca 90'	Stadium: Lockhart Stadium; Attendance: 4,688

September 24, 2011 28	Atlanta Silverbacks	0–4	Montreal Impact	Atlanta
7:30 PM ET	Ruthven (yellow card) 54' R. Cox (yellow card) 68' Davis (yellow card) 74'	Report	Pore 6', 30', 45+' (pen.); Montaño 18'	Stadium: Atlanta Silverbacks Park

== Statistics ==
=== Appearances and goals ===
No.	Pos	Nat	Player	Total		NASL	
No.	Pos	Nat	Player	Apps	Goals	Apps	Goals
1	GK	(Mexico) MEX	Felipe Quintero	10	0	10	0
2	DF	(United States) USA	Tyler Ruthven	22	0	22	0
3	DF	(United States) USA	Shane Moroney	18	0	18	0
4	DF	(United States) USA	Patrick Robertson	14	0	14	0
5	MF	(United States) USA	Ciaran O'Brien	19	4	19	4
6	MF	(United States) USA	Jordan Davis	23	1	23	1
7	MF	(United States) USA	Jose Parada	8	0	8	0
8	FW	(Bosnia and Herzegovina) BIH	Emsad Zahirovic	7	0	7	0
9	FW	(Honduras) HON	Junior Sandoval	15	2	15	2
10	MF	(Argentina) ARG	Lucas Paulini	22	2	22	2
12	MF	(Puerto Rico) PUR	Fernando González	5	0	5	0
13	DF	(United States) USA	Willie Hunt	22	3	22	3
14	MF	(United States) USA	Nico Colaluca	4	0	4	0
14	DF	(Mexico) MEX	Mario Pérez	10	1	10	1
15	DF	(Japan) JPN	Kohei Matsushita	13	0	13	0
16	DF	(United States) USA	Josh Casarona	8	0	8	0
17	MF	(Liberia) LBR	Moussa Toure	3	0	3	0
18	FW	(United States) USA	Matt Horth	22	6	22	6
19	MF	(Scotland) SCO	Grant Kerr	1	0	1	0
19	DF	(Colombia) COL	Cristian Quiñones	1	0	1	0
20	GK	(United States) USA	Jimmy Maurer	13	0	13	0
21	MF	(United States) USA	Raphael Cox	22	2	22	2
22	FW	(United States) USA	Jon Cox	12	0	12	0
23	DF	(Switzerland) SUI	Mattias Schnorf	15	0	15	0
25	FW	(United States) USA	Conor Chinn	6	0	6	0
26	GK	(United States) USA	Eric Ati	0	0	0	0
65	MF	(Mexico) MEX	Paco Rueda	0	0	0	0

Last updated: August 30, 2011

=== Clean sheets ===
No.	Pos	Nat	Player	Total		NASL	
No.	Pos	Nat	Player	Apps	Clean sheets	Apps	Clean sheets
1	GK	(Mexico) MEX	Felipe Quintero	10	1	10	1
20	GK	(United States) USA	Jimmy Maurer	13	1	13	1

=== Disciplinary record ===
No.	Nat	Pos.	Player	Total			NASL		
No.	Nat	Pos.	Player	Yellow card	(yellow card) (yellow-red card)	Red card	Yellow card	(yellow card) (yellow-red card)	Red card
1	(Mexico)	GK	Felipe Quintero	2	0	1	2	0	1
2	(United States)	DF	Tyler Ruthven	5	0	0	5	0	0
4	(United States)	DF	Robertson	2	0	0	2	0	0
5	(United States)	MF	Ciaran O'Brien	1	0	0	1	0	0
6	(United States)	MF	Jordan Davis	4	0	0	4	0	0
7	(United States)	DF	Jose Parada	1	0	0	1	0	0
10	(Argentina)	MF	Lucas Paulini	1	1	0	1	1	0
13	(United States)	DF	Willie Hunt	2	0	0	2	0	0
14	(Mexico)	DF	Mario Peréz	4	0	0	4	0	0
15	(Japan)	DF	Kohei Matsushita	1	0	0	1	0	0
16	(United States)	DF	Josh Casarona	3	0	0	3	0	0
17	(Liberia)	MF	Moussa Toure	1	0	0	1	0	0
18	(United States)	FW	Matt Horth	2	0	0	2	0	0
21	(United States)	FW	Raphael Cox	3	0	0	3	0	0
22	(United States)	FW	Jon Cox	1	0	1	1	0	1
23	(Switzerland)	DF	Mattias Schnorf	4	0	0	4	0	0

Last updated: August 30, 2011
Source: NASL
Only competitive matches.

== Transfers ==
=== In ===
No.	Pos.	Nat.	Name	Age	Moving from	Type	Transfer window	Ends	Transfer fee	Source
15	DF	(Japan)	Kohei Matsushita	25	Ehime (Japan)	Transfer	Pre-season	Undisclosed	Undisclosed	AtlantaSilverbacks.com
23	DF	(Switzerland)	Mattias Schnorf	26	Winterthur (Switzerland)	Transfer	Pre-season	Undisclosed	Undisclosed	AtlantaSilverbacks.com
18	FW	(United States)	Matt Horth	21	Gordon College Fighting Scotts	Transfer	Pre-season	Undisclosed	Undisclosed	AtlantaSilverbacks.com
3	DF	(United States)	Shane Moroney	22	Berry College Vikings	Transfer	Pre-season	Undisclosed	Undisclosed	AtlantaSilverbacks.com
12	MF	(Puerto Rico)	Fernando González	21	South Florida Bulls	Transfer	Pre-season	Undisclosed	Undisclosed	AtlantaSilverbacks.com
8	FW	(Bosnia and Herzegovina)	Emsad Zahirovic	22		Transfer	Pre-season	Undisclosed	Undisclosed	AtlantaSilverbacks.com
7	MF	(United States)	Jose Parada	23	Tulsa Golden Hurricane	Transfer	Pre-season	Undisclosed	Undisclosed	AtlantaSilverbacks.com
4	DF	(United States)	Patrick Robertson	24	Puerto Rico Islanders	Transfer	Pre-season	Undisclosed	Undisclosed	AtlantaSilverbacks.com
14	DF	(Mexico)	Mario Pérez	28	Club Atlas (Mexico)	Transfer	Pre-season	Undisclosed	Undisclosed	AtlantaSilverbacks.com
10	MF	(Argentina)	Lucas Paulini	21	Mississippi Brilla	Transfer	Pre-season	Undisclosed	Undisclosed	AtlantaSilverbacks.com
6	MF	(United States)	Jordan Davis	28	Atlanta Silverbacks U23	Transfer	Pre-season	Undisclosed	Undisclosed	AtlantaSilverbacks.com
2	DF	(United States)	Tyler Ruthven	22	Harrisburg City Islanders	Transfer	Pre-season	Undisclosed	Undisclosed	AtlantaSilverbacks.com
1	GK	(Mexico)	Felipe Quintero	31	Atlanta Silverbacks	Transfer	Pre-season	Undisclosed	Undisclosed	AtlantaSilverbacks.com
5	MF	(United States)	Ciaran O'Brien	23	Colorado Rapids	Transfer	Pre-season	Undisclosed	Undisclosed	AtlantaSilverbacks.com
22	FW	(United States)	Jon Cox	24	Georgia Southern Eagles	Transfer	Pre-season	Undisclosed	Undisclosed	AtlantaSilverbacks.com
20	GK	(United States)	Jimmy Maurer	22	New York Red Bulls	Transfer	Pre-season	Undisclosed	Undisclosed	AtlantaSilverbacks.com
13	DF	(United States)	Willie Hunt	23	Mississippi Brilla	Transfer	Pre-season	Undisclosed	Undisclosed	AtlantaSilverbacks.com
21	MF	(United States)	Raphael Cox	24	Real Salt Lake	Transfer	Pre-season	Undisclosed	Undisclosed	AtlantaSilverbacks.com
16	DF	(United States)	Josh Casarona	18	Deportivo Español (Argentina)	Transfer	Pre-season	Undisclosed	Undisclosed	AtlantaSilverbacks.com
65	MF	(Mexico)	Paco Rueda	27	La Piedad (Mexico)	Transfer	Pre-season	Undisclosed	Undisclosed	AtlantaSilverbacks.com
17	MF	(Liberia)	Moussa Toure	25	Fort Lauderdale Schulz Academy	Transfer	Pre-season	Undisclosed	Undisclosed	AtlantaSilverbacks.com
25	FW	(United States)	Conor Chinn	23	Real Salt Lake	Transfer	Summer	Undisclosed	Undisclosed	NASL.com
14	MF	(United States)	Nico Colaluca	25	Norrby IF (Sweden)	Transfer	Summer	Undisclosed	Undisclosed	NASL.com
14	GK	(Cameroon)	Eric Ati	22	Atlanta Silverbacks Reserves	Transfer	Summer	Undisclosed	Undisclosed	NASL.com

Last updated: February 2013

=== Out ===
No.	Pos.	Nat.	Name	Age	Moving to	Type	Transfer window	Transfer fee	Source
14	DF	(Mexico)	Mario Pérez	29	Estudiantes Tecos (Mexico)	Transfer	Summer	Undisclosed	AtlantaSilverbacks.com
65	MF	(Mexico)	Paco Rueda	27		Released	Summer	–	AtlantaSilverbacks.com
19	DF	(Colombia)	Cristian Quiñones	19	Fort Lauderdale Strikers	Loan terminated	Summer	–	NASL.com
8	FW	(Bosnia and Herzegovina)	Emsad Zahirovic	23		Breach of contract	Summer	–	NASL.com

Last updated: February 2013

=== Loan in ===
No.	Pos.	Nat.	Name	Age	Moving from	Type	Transfer window	Ends	Transfer fee	Source
9	MF	(Honduras)	Junior Sandoval	20	Puerto Rico Islanders	Loan	Pre-season	August 12, 2011	–	AtlantaSilverbacks.com
19	DF	(Colombia)	Cristian Quiñones	19	Fort Lauderdale Strikers	Loan	Summer	2011	–	NASL.com
19	MF	(Scotland)	Grant Kerr	26	Fort Lauderdale Strikers	Loan	Summer	2011	–	NASL.com

Last updated: February 2013

=== Loan out ===
No.	Pos.	Nat.	Name	Age	Moving to	Type	Transfer window	Transfer fee	Source
23	DF	(Switzerland)	Mattias Schnorf	27	SC Young Fellows Juventus (Switzerland)	Loan	Post-season	–	AtlantaSilverbacks.com

Last updated: February 2013

== See also ==
- 2011 in American soccer
- 2011 North American Soccer League season
- Atlanta Silverbacks
