= 2012 Atlanta Silverbacks season =

Atlanta Silverbacks
2012 season
- Owners: Boris Jerkunica; John Latham
- Head coach: Brian Haynes
- Stadium: Atlanta Silverbacks Park
- NASL: 7th
- Playoffs: Did not qualify
- U.S. Open Cup: Third round
- Highest home attendance: 6000
- Lowest home attendance: 2357
- Average home league attendance: 4504
Home colors	Away colors

The 2012 Atlanta Silverbacks season was the club's sixteenth season of existence, and their second consecutive season playing in the North American Soccer League (NASL), the second tier of the American soccer pyramid. The Silverbacks has finished in 2011 at the bottom of the regular season standings.

== Background ==
The 2011 season marked the Silverbacks return to American soccer following a two-year hiatus, that did not see the organization field a senior men's team throughout the 2009 and 2010 seasons.

The return season was arguably an abysmal campaign for the Silverbacks, as the club lost 20 of its 28 regular season matches, drawing and winning four matches apiece. During the regular season, the Silverbacks were mathematically eliminated from playoff contention with seven weeks left in the NASL regular season. José Manuel Abundis, then the head coach, was fired following the season replaced by then-assistant coach, Alex Pineda Chacón, whom played for the Silverbacks from 2003–04. The announcement came on November 7, 2011.

== Review ==
=== Offseason ===
On February 6, the Silverbacks released their preseason schedule, that involved matches against local college soccer and nearby NASL/USL Pro clubs.

== Competitions ==
=== Preseason ===
March 3, 2012	Atlanta Silverbacks	2 - 0	UAB	Chamblee, Georgia USA
16:00 EST	Horth 11', 33'	Report		Stadium: Atlanta Silverbacks Park

March 10, 2012	Atlanta Silverbacks	1 - 0	Charleston Battery	Chamblee, Georgia USA
16:00 EST	Paulini 11'; Cox (red card) 67'	Report	Unknown (red card) 67'	Stadium: Atlanta Silverbacks Park

March 17, 2012	Atlanta Silverbacks	1 - 1	Mercer University	Chamblee, Georgia USA
16:00 EST				Stadium: Atlanta Silverbacks Park

March 18, 2012	United States U-23	3 - 0	Atlanta Silverbacks	Nashville, Tennessee USA
19:00 EST	Shea 31', 45'; Stephens 67'	Report		Stadium: Lipscomb University; Attendance: Closed-door

March 21, 2012	Atlanta Silverbacks	3 - 2	Clayton State University	Chamblee, Georgia USA
16:30 EST	Santamaria, Carr	Report	Cruz 23'; Ray 85'	Stadium: Atlanta Silverbacks Park

March 24, 2012	Furman University	0 - 0	Atlanta Silverbacks	Greenville, South Carolina USA
13:30 EST				Stadium: Stone Soccer Stadium

March 24, 2012	Georgia State University	0 - 0	Atlanta Silverbacks	Greenville, South Carolina USA
15:00 EST				Stadium: Stone Soccer Stadium

March 30, 2012	Atlanta Silverbacks	0 - 0	Charlotte Eagles	Chamblee, Georgia USA
18:00 EST				Stadium: Atlanta Silverbacks Park

=== NASL ===
==== Standings ====
Pos	Team	Pld	W	D	L	GF	GA	GD	Pts	Qualification
4	Carolina RailHawks	28	10	10	8	44	46	−2	40	Playoff quarterfinals
5	Fort Lauderdale Strikers	28	9	9	10	40	46	−6	36	Playoff quarterfinals
6	Minnesota United	28	8	11	9	34	33	+1	35	Playoff quarterfinals
7	Atlanta Silverbacks	28	7	9	12	35	46	−11	30	
8	FC Edmonton	28	5	10	13	26	36	−10	25	

Source: NASL Standings
Rules for classification: 1) points; 2) goal difference; 3) number of goals scored.

==== Results summary ====
Overall								Home						Away					
Pld	W	D	L	GF	GA	GD	Pts	W	D	L	GF	GA	GD	W	D	L	GF	GA	GD
28	7	9	12	35	46	−11	30	4	4	6	18	20	−2	3	5	6	17	26	−9

Last updated: September 22, 2012.
Source: Match results

==== Results by round ====
Round	1	2	3	4	5	6	7	8	9	10	11	12	13	14	15	16	17	18	19	20	21	22	23	24	25	26	27	28
Stadium	H	A	H	H	A	H	A	H	A	A	A	H	H	A	A	A	H	H	A	H	A	H	H	A	A	H	H	A
Result	D	D	D	D	L	L	L	L	D	W	L	L	L	L	L	W	W	L	L	W	D	D	L	W	D	W	W	D

Updated to match(es) played on September 22, 2012. Source: Match results
A = Away; H = Home; W = Win; D = Draw; L = Loss

==== Match results ====
8 April 2012 1	Atlanta Silverbacks	0–0	San Antonio Scorpions FC	Chamblee, Georgia
19:30	Moroney (yellow card) 38'; Navia (yellow card) 89'	Report	Pablo Campos (yellow card) 14'; Soto (yellow card) 90'	Stadium: Atlanta Silverbacks Park; Attendance: 5,000

15 April 2012 2	Carolina RailHawks FC	4–4	Atlanta Silverbacks	Cary, North Carolina
19:00	Palacio 2'; Krause (yellow card) 26'; Zimmerman 37', 74'; Lowery (yellow card) 61'; Shriver 89'; Ackley (red card) 90'	Report	Matsushita (yellow card) 21'; Navia 39', 80'; Cox 42'; Paulini (yellow card) 43'; Hunt (yellow card) 54' (yellow-red card) 77' (goal) 67'; O'Brien (yellow card) 70'; Illyés (yellow card) 81'; Colaluca (red card) 90'	Stadium: WakeMed Soccer Park; Attendance: 3,653

22 April 2012 3	Atlanta Silverbacks	1–1	Tampa Bay Rowdies	Chamblee, Georgia
19:30	Robertson (yellow card) 73'; Navia 86'	Report	Antoniuk 71'; Mulholland (yellow card) 84'	Stadium: Atlanta Silverbacks Park; Attendance: 3,261

28 April 2012 4	Atlanta Silverbacks	3–3	Minnesota Stars FC	Chamblee, Georgia
19:30	Navia 48', 64' (yellow card) 81'; Santamaria 79'	Report	Walker 66'; Del Do 88'; Davis 90' (yellow card) 90'	Stadium: Atlanta Silverbacks Park; Attendance: 4,176

5 May 2012 5	Minnesota Stars FC	2–0	Atlanta Silverbacks	Blaine, Minnesota
20:30	Ernest Tchoupe 24' (yellow card) 40'; Takada (yellow card) 42'; Davis (yellow card) 59'; Ibarra 76'	Summary	Robertson (yellow card) 33'; Lancaster (yellow card) 52'; Carr (yellow card) 59' (red card) 88'; McManus (yellow card) 70' (yellow-red card) 71'	Stadium: National Sports Center; Attendance: 1,692

12 May 2012 6	Atlanta Silverbacks	0–2	FC Edmonton	Chamblee, Georgia
19:30	Navia (yellow card) 26'; Moroney (red card) 58'	Summary	Hatchi (yellow card) 10'; Cox 14' (yellow card) 77' van Leerdam 87'	Stadium: Atlanta Silverbacks Park; Attendance: 4,743

16 May 2012 7	Puerto Rico Islanders	3–0	Atlanta Silverbacks	Bayamón, Puerto Rico
19:30	Foley (yellow card) 19' (goal) 53'; Faña (yellow card) 36'; Ramos 78'; Wilson 88'	Summary	McManus (yellow card) 30'; Navia (yellow card) 40'; Lancaster (red card) 52'	Stadium: Juan Ramón Loubriel Stadium; Attendance: 1,000

19 May 2012 8	Atlanta Silverbacks	2–3	Tampa Bay Rowdies	Chamblee, Georgia
19:30	Moroney 64', 89'; Carr (yellow card) 80'	Summary	Antoniuk 12', 37'; Yamada (yellow card) 60'; Ambersley 78'	Stadium: Atlanta Silverbacks Park; Attendance: 5,000

26 May 2012 9	Fort Lauderdale Strikers	1–1	Atlanta Silverbacks	Fort Lauderdale, Florida
19:30	Anderson (yellow card) 27' (goal) 49'; Blake (yellow card) 35'; Gebor (yellow card) 59'; Ståhl (yellow card) 68' (yellow-red card) 73'; Glaeser (yellow card) 74'; Restrepo (yellow card) 88'	Summary	Paulini (yellow card) 47'; Navia 69'; O'Brien (yellow card) 89'	Stadium: Lockhart Stadium; Attendance: 2,404

2 June 2012 10	FC Edmonton	1–2	Atlanta Silverbacks	Edmonton
16:00	Hatchi (yellow card) 6' (goal) 52'	Summary	O'Brien 30'; Moroney 40'; Lancaster (red card) 78'	Stadium: Clarke Stadium; Attendance: 2,521

9 June 2012 11	San Antonio Scorpions	3–0	Atlanta Silverbacks	San Antonio
20:45	Pablo Campos 27', 83'; Ramírez 35'; Harmse (yellow card) 45'; Wagner (yellow card) 54'	Summary	O'Brien (yellow card) 45'	Stadium: Heroes Stadium; Attendance: 7,007

16 June 2012 12	Atlanta Silverbacks	0–2	Carolina RailHawks	Chamblee, Georgia
20:30	Navia (yellow card) 31'	Summary	Schilawski 44'; Agbossoumonde (yellow card) 45+2'; Ackley 86'	Stadium: Atlanta Silverbacks Park; Attendance: 6,000

23 June 2012 13	Atlanta Silverbacks	1–2	Puerto Rico Islanders	Chamblee, Georgia
19:30	Horth 37'; Lancaster (yellow card) 56'	Summary	Addlery 16', 70' vanSchaik (yellow card) 20'; Telesford (yellow card) 90'	Stadium: Atlanta Silverbacks Park; Attendance: 5,000

31 June 2012 14	San Antonio Scorpions	3–0	Atlanta Silverbacks	San Antonio, Texas
19:45	Cochrane (yellow card) 15'; Bayona 25'; Pablo Campos 63', 81'	Summary	Lancaster (yellow card) 72'; Robertson (yellow card) 81'; Illyés (yellow card) 88'	Stadium: Heroes Stadium; Attendance: 11,912

3 July 2012 15	Carolina RailHawks	2–1	Atlanta Silverbacks	Cary, North Carolina
19:00	Zimmerman 4', 50' (yellow card) 84'	Summary	Horth 15'; Robertson (yellow card) 64'	Stadium: WakeMed Soccer Park; Attendance: 4,475

7 July 2012 16	Minnesota Stars FC	0–2	Atlanta Silverbacks	Blaine, Minnesota
20:30	Venegas (yellow card) 35'	Summary	Horth 10'; McManus (yellow card) 68'; Carr 75'	Stadium: National Sports Center; Attendance: 1,728

14 July 2012 17	Atlanta Silverbacks	2–1	Puerto Rico Islanders	Chamblee, Georgia
19:30	Lancaster (yellow card) 9'; Colaluca 45' (yellow card) 80'; Horth 63'	Summary	Addlery (yellow card) 27'; Edward (yellow card) 36'; Richardson 86'; Vázquez (yellow card) 87'	Stadium: Atlanta Silverbacks Park; Attendance: 4,869

21 July 2012 18	Atlanta Silverbacks	1–2	FC Edmonton	Chamblee, Georgia
19:30	O'Brien 74' (pen.)	Summary	Barthélémy 63'; Pinto 65' (yellow card) 89'; Joseph-Augustin (red card) 73'	Stadium: Atlanta Silverbacks Park; Attendance: 4,250

27 July 2012 19	Fort Lauderdale Strikers	5–3	Atlanta Silverbacks	Fort Lauderdale, Florida
19:30	Paulo Araújo 5'; Pecka (yellow card) 8'; Anderson 28'; Stewart (yellow card) 30'; Hassan 54', 67' (pen.) (yellow card) 63'; Shanosky (yellow card) 55'; Motagalvan (yellow card) 85'; Restrepo 90+3'	Summary	Barrera (yellow card) 22'; Pedro Ferreira-Mendes 31' (pen.); Horth 41'; Blanco (yellow card) 57'; Paulo Ferreira-Mendes 76'	Stadium: Lockhart Stadium; Attendance: 3,160

4 August 2012 20	Atlanta Silverbacks	4–2	Fort Lauderdale Strikers	Chamblee, Georgia
19:30	Pedro Ferreira-Mendes 8', 78' (yellow card) 79'; Horth 29'; Carr 64'; Colaluca (yellow card) 73'	Summary	Gordon 26'; Anderson 55'; Orozco (yellow card) 66'	Stadium: Atlanta Silverbacks Park; Attendance: 4,090

12 August 2012 21	Tampa Bay Rowdies	0–0	Atlanta Silverbacks	St. Petersburg, Florida
19:30	Mulholland (yellow card) 84'; Arango (yellow card) 90'	Summary	Willis (yellow card) 54'; Randolph (yellow card) 70'	Stadium: Progress Energy Park; Attendance: 3,027

18 August 2012 22	Atlanta Silverbacks	0–0	Minnesota Stars FC	Chamblee, Georgia
19:30	O'Brien (yellow card) 61' (yellow-red card) 61'	Summary	Altman (yellow card) 23'; Davis (yellow card) 90'	Stadium: Atlanta Silverbacks Park; Attendance: 3,911

25 August 2012 23	Atlanta Silverbacks	0–1	Carolina RailHawks	Chamblee, Georgia
19:30	Burciaga, Jr. (yellow card) 19'; Navarro (yellow card) 26'	Summary	Agbossoumonde (yellow card) 29'; Lowery (yellow card) 55'; Ackley 66'	Stadium: Atlanta Silverbacks Park; Attendance: 4,896

2 September 2012 24	FC Edmonton	0–2	Atlanta Silverbacks	Edmonton
15:05		Summary	Horth 56', 61'; Blanco (yellow card) 84'	Stadium: Clarke Stadium; Attendance: 1,475

8 September 2012 25	Tampa Bay Rowdies	1–1	Atlanta Silverbacks	St. Petersburg, Florida
19:30	Yamada 42'; Ababio (yellow card) 53'	Summary	Horth 30'; Carr (yellow card) 87'	Stadium: Progress Energy Park

15 September 2012 26	Atlanta Silverbacks	1–0	Fort Lauderdale Strikers	Chamblee, Georgia
19:30	Horth 11'; Paulini (yellow card) 42'; Pedro Ferreira-Mendes (yellow card) 81'	Summary	King (yellow card) 26'; Motagalvan (yellow card) 74' (yellow-red card) 75'; Hassan (yellow card) 86'; Herron (yellow card) 90'	Stadium: Atlanta Silverbacks Park; Attendance: 5,511

19 September 2012 27	Atlanta Silverbacks	3–1	San Antonio Scorpions	Chamblee, Georgia
19:30	Hunt 3'; Blanco (yellow card) 31'; Wagner 40' (o.g.); Paulini (yellow card) 45'; Pedro Ferreira-Mendes 74'	Summary	Harmse (yellow card) 30'; Soto 68' (yellow card) 77'; Wagner (yellow card) 83'; Pitchkolan (yellow card) 90'	Stadium: Atlanta Silverbacks Park; Attendance: 2,357

22 September 2012 28	Puerto Rico Islanders	1–1	Atlanta Silverbacks	Bayamón, Puerto Rico
19:30	Telesford (yellow card) 27'; Fojo 54' deRoux (yellow card) 59'	Summary	Barrera (yellow card) 17' (goal) 30'; Hunt (yellow card) 51'; Pedro Ferreira-Mendes (yellow card) 67'; Navia (yellow card) 79'; Blanco (yellow card) 89'	Stadium: Juan Ramón Loubriel Stadium; Attendance: 1,507

=== U.S. Open Cup ===
22 May 2012 Round 2	Georgia Revolution	0 - 1	Atlanta Silverbacks	Conyers, Georgia
19:30		Summary	Raphel Cox 61'	Stadium: RYSA Soccerplex

30 May 2012 Round 3	Seattle Sounders FC	5 - 1	Atlanta Silverbacks	Tukwila, Washington
22:00	Rose 44'; Alonso 47'; Caskey 54'; Burch (yellow card) 59'; Ochoa 62', 66'	Summary	Navia 53' (yellow card) 59'	Stadium: Starfire Sports Complex; Attendance: 3,703

== Statistics ==
=== Appearances and goals ===
No.	Pos	Nat	Player	Total		NASL		U.S. Open Cup	
No.	Pos	Nat	Player	Apps	Goals	Apps	Goals	Apps	Goals
1	GK	(Hungary) HUN	Daniel Illyes	22	0	22	0	0	0
2	DF	(United States) USA	Chris Klute	12	0	12	0	0	0
3	DF	(United States) USA	Shane Moroney	20	3	18	3	2	0
4	DF	(United States) USA	Patrick Robertson	14	0	14	0	0	0
5	MF	(Argentina) ARG	Lucas Paulini	13	0	13	0	0	0
6	DF	(United States) USA	Beto Navarro	8	0	8	0	0	0
7	MF	(United States) USA	Ciaran O'Brien	24	2	22	2	2	0
8	GK	(United States) USA	Joe Nasco	5	0	3	0	2	0
9	FW	(Canada) CAN	Stephen Ademolu	0	0	0	0	0	0
9	FW	(Brazil) BRA	Pedro Ferreira-Mendes	5	0	3	0	2	0
10	MF	(United States) USA	Danny Barrera	9	1	9	1	0	0
11	FW	(Chile) CHI	Reinaldo Navia	19	8	17	7	2	1
12	MF	(Puerto Rico) PUR	Fernando González	9	0	9	0	0	0
12	MF	(Jamaica) JAM	Horace James	4	0	4	0	0	0
13	DF	(United States) USA	Willie Hunt	11	2	11	2	0	0
14	MF	(United States) USA	Nico Colaluca	17	1	15	1	2	0
15	DF	(Japan) JPN	Kohei Matsushita	4	0	4	0	0	0
16	GK	(Cameroon) CMR	Eric Ati	3	0	3	0	0	0
17	MF	(United States) USA	Andrew Duran	7	0	7	0	0	0
18	FW	(United States) USA	Matt Horth	25	10	23	10	2	0
19	FW	(Liberia) LBR	Borfor Carr	24	2	22	2	2	0
20	MF	(Honduras) HON	Danilo Turcios	14	0	12	0	2	0
21	MF	(United States) USA	Raphael Cox	18	3	16	2	2	1
22	DF	(United States) USA	Mike Randolph	3	0	3	0	0	0
23	FW	(United States) USA	Milton Blanco	9	0	9	0	0	0
24	MF	(United States) USA	Pablo Cruz	6	0	6	0	0	0
25	MF	(Brazil) BRA	Paulo Ferreira-Mendes	10	1	10	1	0	0
26	MF	(United States) USA	Jordan Davis	9	0	7	0	2	0
27	DF	(England) ENG	Martyn Lancaster	27	0	25	0	2	0
28	DF	(United States) USA	José Burciaga, Jr.	15	0	13	0	2	0
30	MF	(United States) USA	Tony McManus	23	0	21	0	2	0
44	DF	(Brazil) BRA	Rilla	7	0	7	0	0	0
77	FW	(United States) USA	Jahbari Willis	6	0	6	0	0	0
99	FW	(United States) USA	David Santamaria	8	1	7	1	1	0

=== Clean sheets ===
No.	Pos	Nat	Player	Total		NASL		U.S. Open Cup	
No.	Pos	Nat	Player	Apps	Clean sheets	Apps	Clean sheets	Apps	Clean sheets
1	GK	(Hungary) HUN	Daniel Illyes	22	4	22	4	0	0
8	GK	(United States) USA	Joe Nasco	5	2	3	1	2	1
16	GK	(Cameroon) CMR	Eric Ati	3	1	3	1	0	0

=== Disciplinary record ===
No.	Nat	Pos.	Player	Total			NASL			U.S. Open Cup		
No.	Nat	Pos.	Player	Yellow card	(yellow card) (yellow-red card)	Red card	Yellow card	(yellow card) (yellow-red card)	Red card	Yellow card	(yellow card) (yellow-red card)	Red card
1	(Hungary)	GK	Daniel Illyes	2	0	0	2	0	0	0	0	0
3	(United States)	DF	Shane Moroney	1	0	1	1	0	1	0	0	0
4	(United States)	DF	Patrick Robertson	4	0	0	4	0	0	0	0	0
5	(Argentina)	MF	Lucas Paulini	4	0	0	4	0	0	0	0	0
6	(United States)	DF	Beto Navarro	1	0	0	1	0	0	0	0	0
7	(United States)	MF	Ciaran O'Brien	4	1	0	4	1	0	0	0	0
9	(Brazil)	FW	Pedro Ferreira-Mendes	3	0	0	3	0	0	0	0	0
10	(United States)	MF	Danny Barrera	2	0	0	2	0	0	0	0	0
11	(Chile)	FW	Reinaldo Navia	7	0	0	6	0	0	1	0	0
12	(Puerto Rico)	MF	Fernando Gonzalez	1	0	0	1	0	0	0	0	0
13	(United States)	DF	Willie Hunt	2	1	0	2	1	0	0	0	0
14	(United States)	MF	Nico Colaluca	2	0	1	2	0	1	0	0	0
15	(Japan)	DF	Kohei Matsushita	2	0	0	2	0	0	0	0	0
17	(United States)	MF	Andrew Duran	1	0	0	1	0	0	0	0	0
19	(Liberia)	FW	Borfor Carr	3	0	1	3	0	1	0	0	0
20	(Honduras)	MF	Danilo Turcios	2	0	0	2	0	0	0	0	0
21	(United States)	MF	Raphael Cox	2	0	0	2	0	0	0	0	0
22	(United States)	DF	Mike Randolph	1	0	0	1	0	0	0	0	0
23	(United States)	FW	Milton Blanco	4	0	0	4	0	0	0	0	0
26	(United States)	MF	Jordan Davis	1	0	0	1	0	0	0	0	0
27	(England)	DF	Martyn Lancaster	4	0	2	4	0	2	0	0	0
28	(United States)	DF	José Burciaga, Jr.	1	0	0	1	0	0	0	0	0
30	(United States)	MF	Tony McManus	3	1	0	3	1	0	0	0	0
44	(Brazil)	DF	Rilla	1	0	0	1	0	0	0	0	0
77	(United States)	FW	Jahbari Willis	1	0	0	1	0	0	0	0	0
99	(United States)	FW	David Santamaria	1	0	0	1	0	0	0	0	0

Last updated: February 20, 2012
Source: SoccerWay.com
Only competitive matches

== Transfers ==
=== In ===
No.	Pos.	Nat.	Name	Age	Moving from	Type	Transfer window	Ends	Transfer fee	Source
27	DF	(England)	Martyn Lancaster	31	Fort Lauderdale Strikers	Signed	Pre-season	2012	Undisclosed	AtlantaSilverbacks.com
44	DF	(Brazil)	Rilla	29	Rio Verde (Brazil)	Signed	Pre-season	2012	Undisclosed	AtlantaSilverbacks.com
11	FW	(Chile)	Reinaldo Navia	33	Ñublense (Chile)	Signed	Pre-season	2012	Undisclosed	AtlantaSilverbacks.com
9	FW	(Canada)	Stephen Ademolu	29	Windsor Stars (Canada)	Signed	Pre-season	2012	Undisclosed	AtlantaSilverbacks.com
1	GK	(Hungary)	Dániel Illyés	29	Eger (Hungary)	Signed	Pre-season	2012	Undisclosed	AtlantaSilverbacks.com
30	MF	(United States)	Tony McManus	31	Carolina RailHawks	Signed	Pre-season	2012	Undisclosed	AtlantaSilverbacks.com
20	MF	(Honduras)	Danilo Turcios	33	Olimpia (Honduras)	Signed	Pre-season	2012	Undisclosed	AtlantaSilverbacks.com
8	GK	(United States)	Joe Nasco	27		Signed	Pre-season	2012	Undisclosed	AtlantaSilverbacks.com
19	MF	(Liberia)	Borfor Carr	24	Atlanta Silverbacks Reserves	Transfer	Spring	2012	Free	AtlantaSilverbacks.com
28	DF	(United States)	Jose Burciaga, Jr.	30		Signed	Spring	2012	Undisclosed	AtlantaSilverbacks.com
77	FW	(United States)	Jahbari Willis	21	Atlanta Silverbacks Reserves	Transfer	Summer	2012	Free	AtlantaSilverbacks.com
2	DF	(United States)	Chris Klute	22	Atlanta Silverbacks Reserves	Transfer	Summer	2012	Free	AtlantaSilverbacks.com
10	MF	(United States)	Danny Barrera	22	Cal FC	Transfer	Summer	2012	Undisclosed	AtlantaSilverbacks.com
24	MF	(United States)	Pablo Cruz	20	Cal FC	Transfer	Summer	2012	Undisclosed	AtlantaSilverbacks.com
22	DF	(United States)	Mike Randolph	26	Cal FC	Transfer	Summer	2012	Undisclosed	AtlantaSilverbacks.com
23	FW	(United States)	Milton Blanco	28	Cal FC	Transfer	Summer	2012	Undisclosed	AtlantaSilverbacks.com
25	MF	(Brazil)	Paulo Ferreira-Mendes	22	Cal FC	Transfer	Summer	2012	Undisclosed	AtlantaSilverbacks.com
9	MF	(Brazil)	Pedro Ferreira-Mendes	22	Cal FC	Transfer	Summer	2012	Undisclosed	AtlantaSilverbacks.com
6	DF	(United States)	Beto Navarro	23	Cal FC	Transfer	Summer	2012	Undisclosed	AtlantaSilverbacks.com
12	MF	(Jamaica)	Horace James	27	Montego Bay United (Jamaica)	Transfer	Summer	2012	Undisclosed	AtlantaSilverbacks.com

Last updated: 22 March 2013

=== Out ===
No.	Pos.	Nat.	Name	Age	Moving to	Type	Transfer window	Transfer fee	Source
16	DF	(United States)	Josh Casarona	19		Option declined	Pre-season		AtlantaSilverbacks.com
22	FW	(United States)	Jon Cox	24		Option declined	Pre-season		AtlantaSilverbacks.com
17	MF	(Liberia)	Moussa Toure	26		Option declined	Pre-season		AtlantaSilverbacks.com
7	MF	(United States)	Jose Parada	24		Option declined	Pre-season		AtlantaSilverbacks.com
2	DF	(United States)	Tyler Ruthven	23	New York Red Bulls	Transfer	Pre-season	Undisclosed	AtlantaSilverbacks.com
20	MF	(Honduras)	Danilo Turcios	34		Released	Summer		AtlantaSilverbacks.com
44	DF	(Brazil)	Rilla	29		Released	Summer		AtlantaSilverbacks.com
15	DF	(Japan)	Kohei Matsushita	26		Released	Summer		AtlantaSilverbacks.com
26	MF	(United States)	Jordan Davis	29		Released	Summer		AtlantaSilverbacks.com
12	MF	(Puerto Rico)	Fernando González	23		Released	Summer		AtlantaSilverbacks.com
99	DF	(United States)	David Santamaria	21		Terminate loan	Summer		AtlantaSilverbacks.com
21	MF	(United States)	Raphael Cox	26		Released	Summer		AtlantaSilverbacks.com

Last updated: 22 March 2013

=== Loan in ===
No.	Pos.	Nat.	Name	Age	Moving from	Type	Transfer window	Ends	Transfer fee	Source
99	FW	(United States)	David Santamaria	21	Fort Lauderdale Strikers	Loan	Pre-season	2012	Undisclosed	AtlantaSilverbacks.com
17	DF	(United States)	Andrew Duran	22	Seattle Sounders FC	Loan	Summer	2012	Undisclosed	AtlantaSilverbacks.com

Last updated: 22 March 2013

=== Loan out ===
No.	Pos.	Nat.	Name	Age	Moving to	Type	Transfer window	Transfer fee	Source
2	DF	(United States)	Chris Klute	22	Colorado Rapids	Loan	Fall	Undisclosed	AtlantaSilverbacks.com

Last updated: 22 March 2013

== See also ==
- 2012 in American soccer
- 2012 North American Soccer League season
- Atlanta Silverbacks
