= Francisco Quintero =

Mexican footballer (1923-1979)

Francisco Quintero Nava (8 March 1923 in Guadalajara, Mexico – 10 March 1979) was a Mexican football player. He was a goalkeeper for Club Deportivo Guadalajara (Chivas) and represented Mexico at the 1948 Summer Olympics in London. Among his teammates was Antonio Carbajal. He is the grandfather of current goalkeeper for the Atlanta Silverbacks, Felipe Quintero Monsivais.

== See also ==
- Club Deportivo Guadalajara
- Mexico at the 1948 Summer Olympics
