= Schnorf =

Schnorf is a Swiss surname. Notable people with the surname include:

- Mattias Schnorf (born 1984), Swiss footballer
- Yvonne Schnorf (born 1965), Swiss cyclist
