= Zahirović =

Zahirović is a Bosnian surname (meaning "son of Zahir"). Notable people with the surname include:

- Adnan Zahirović (born 1990), Bosnian footballer
- Emsad Zahirovic (born 1988), Bosnia-born American footballer
- Ševal Zahirović (born 1972), Bosnian footballer
