= Southern Conference Men's Soccer Freshman of the Year =

The Southern Conference Men's Soccer Freshman of the Year is an annual award given the most outstanding freshman soccer player in the Southern Conference. The award has been given since 1992.

Several players have gone on to have illustrious professional careers that have won this award. Notable examples include Clint Dempsey, Drew Moor and Walker Zimmerman.

== Winners ==
- 1992: Bill Kaushagen, VMI
- 1993: Kevin Turner, Appalachian State
- 1994: Rich Daughtridge, VMI
- 1995: Ronnie Pascale, Furman
- 1996: Peter Slobodyan, Furman
- 1997: David Buehler, Davidson
- 1998: Matt Goldsmith, Furman
- 1999: Soren Johnson, Davidson
- 2000: McNeil Cronin, Furman
- 2001: Clint Dempsey, Furman
- 2002: Drew Moor, Furman
- 2003: Scott Jones, UNCG
- 2004: Matt Smith, UNCG
- 2005: Kiki Willis, Elon
- 2006: Jon Cox, Georgia Southern
- 2007: Haris Cekic, Furman
- 2008: Coleton Henning, Furman
- 2009: Chris Thomas, Elon
- 2010: Andy Craven, Charleston
- 2011: Walker Zimmerman, Furman
- 2012: Nestor Jaramillo, Wofford
- 2013: Bobby Edet, Furman
- 2014: Will Bagrou, Mercer
- 2015: Leeroy Maguraushe, UNCG
- 2016: Joe Pickering, ETSU
- 2017: Nelson Oceano, UNCG
- 2018: Trevor Martineau, Mercer
- 2019: Adrian Roseth, Wofford
- 2020: Jake Raine, Furman & Theo Collomb, UNCG
- 2021: JC Ngando, UNCG
- 2022: Nikolai Rojel, Wofford
- 2023: Barzee Blama, Mercer
- 2024: Issah Haruna, UNCG
- 2025: Braden Dunham, Furman
