= David Santamaria =

American soccer player

David Santamaria Jr
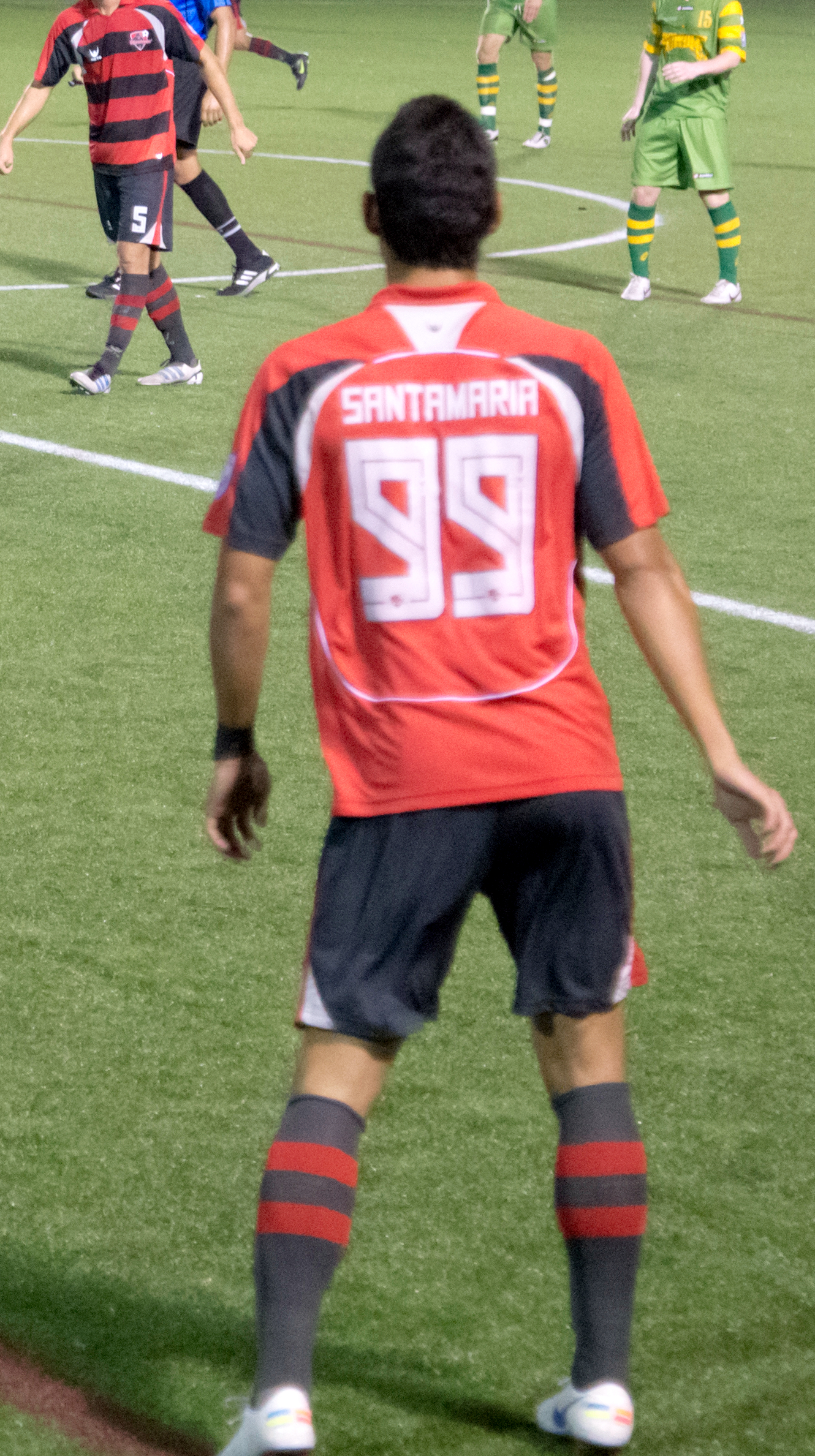
- David Santamaria playing for Atlanta Silverbacks on April 21, 2012

Personal information
- Full name: David Santamaria
- Date of birth: December 15, 1990 (age 35)
- Place of birth: Miami, Florida, United States
- Height: 6 ft 0 in (1.83 m)
- Position: Forward

Team information
- Current team: Miami United F.C.

Youth career
- 2008–2009: Miami FC
- 2010: Jacksonville Dolphins

Senior career*
Years	Team	Apps	(Gls)
2011–2012	Fort Lauderdale Strikers	13	(2)
2012	→ Atlanta Silverbacks (loan)	7	(1)
2013	Des Moines Menace	1	(1)
2014	Cimarrones de Sonora	10	(4)
2015	FC Miami City Champions		
2016	Miami Fusion FC	9	(5)
2017–	Miami United F.C.	3	(2)
- * Club domestic league appearances and goals as of May 13, 2016

David Santamaria (born December 15, 1990) is an American soccer player who currently plays for Miami United F.C. of the National Premier Soccer League.

== Career ==
=== Youth ===
Santamaria grew up in Miami, Florida, attended Miami Sunset Senior High School, and played for the youth academy of former USL First Division side Miami FC, before going on to play one season of college soccer at Jacksonville University.

=== Professional ===
Santamaria turned professional immediately following his freshman college year, and after impressing team owners during the 2010 Traffic combine signed with Fort Lauderdale Strikers of the North American Soccer League. He made his professional debut - and scored his first professional goal - on May 11 in a 4–2 loss to the Carolina RailHawks.

After just one season with the Strikers, Santamaria joined the Atlanta Silverbacks on a season-long loan. On August 8, 2012, the Santamaria and the Silverbacks agreed to terminate the loan agreement after appearing in seven matches and scoring one goal.

Santamaria traveled in September 2012 to Europe to open up his horizons. He spent 2 months training and playing practice matches with the Portuguese club Sporting Clube de Pombal Following that experience, Santamaria traveled for a trial with the Serbian Superliga first division club FK Sloboda Uzice, after spending a month with the club Santamaria turned down an agreement which did not meet his expectations.

In December 2013, Santamaria signed with the Mexican side second division club Cimarrones de Sonora where he played Clausura 2014.
