= Jordan Davis (soccer) =

American soccer player and manager

Personal information
- Full name: Jordan Davis
- Date of birth: January 21, 1983 (age 43)
- Place of birth: Salt Lake City, Utah, United States
- Height: 5 ft 10 in (1.78 m)
- Position: Midfielder

Youth career
- 2002: Charleston Southern Buccaneers
- 2003–2005: Georgia State Panthers

Senior career*
Years	Team	Apps	(Gls)
2003	Columbus Shooting Stars	13	(1)
2004	Richmond Kickers Future	1	(0)
2006–2008	Atlanta Silverbacks U23s	34	(2)
2011–2012	Atlanta Silverbacks	35	(1)
2013–2015	Georgia Revolution FC		

Managerial career
- 2016: Peachtree City MOBA
- * Club domestic league appearances and goals as of July 13, 2012

Jordan Davis (born January 21, 1983) is an American former soccer player and former manager of the PDL's Peachtree City MOBA.

== Career ==
=== College and amateur ===
Davis grew up in Peachtree City, Georgia, and attended Starr's Mill High School and began his college soccer at Charleston Southern University, transferring to Georgia State University before his sophomore season. During his college years Davis also played with the Columbus Shooting Stars and the Richmond Kickers Future in the USL Premier Development League.

=== Professional ===
Undrafted out of college, Davis joined the Atlanta Silverbacks organization as a player and coach, playing three more seasons in the USL Premier Development League for the Silverbacks' PDL affiliate, Atlanta Silverbacks U23s. He went on to play three seasons for the Silverbacks in the PDL, leading the team in minutes played, before leaving when the entire Silverbacks organization went on hiatus at the end of the 2008 season.

After serving as the Director of Coaching for the Coweta Cannons youth soccer club in Newnan, Georgia and an assistant coach at Clayton State University, Davis returned to the professional ranks in 2011 when signed with the reformed Atlanta Silverbacks for their debut season in the North American Soccer League. He made his debut for his new team on April 9, 2011, in a game against the NSC Minnesota Stars

Davis was the U13/15/17 Boys Program Director for the Southern Soccer Academy. He also served as an assistant coach for the women's soccer program at the University of West Georgia.

=== Manager ===
Jordan Davis was hired by the Peachtree City MOBA football club of the Premier Development League as the first manager for the organization on January 20, 2016. The expansion club is based is Peachtree City, Georgia, where Davis played high school soccer. Following the 2016 season, Davis departed the team due to conflicts with his youth club.
