= Grant Kerr =

Scottish footballer

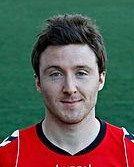

Personal information
- Date of birth: 1 December 1985 (age 40)
- Place of birth: Irvine, Scotland
- Position: Midfielder

Youth career
- 2002–2004: Everton
- 2005–2008: Fordham Rams

Senior career*
Years	Team	Apps	(Gls)
2009	Southend United	0	(0)
2010	Digenis Akritas Morphou		(0)
2011	Fort Lauderdale Strikers	5	(0)
2011	→ Atlanta Silverbacks (loan)	6	(0)
2012	Tønsberg	10	(2)
2012	→ Kvik Halden (loan)	7	(1)
2013	VPS	22	(2)
2014	Iraklis Psachna	1	(0)
- * Club domestic league appearances and goals

Grant Kerr (born 1 December 1985) is a Scottish professional footballer.

== Playing career ==
Kerr played for Hutchison Vale Boys Club in Edinburgh, Scotland from the age of 15. He spent time at Everton F.C. at their youth academy, due to Hutchison Vale's strong links with the Premier League club.

At 19, Kerr accepted an invitation from Fordham University to play NCAA Division I college soccer in the United States. He joined the Fordham Rams in August 2005. He was voted to the All-Rookie team in the Atlantic 10 Championships. In 2009, Kerr graduated with the 5th highest number of appearances in the tit history of Fordham Men's Soccer, only missing one game throughout his four years in New York City. In 2008, he made the All-Atlantic 10 First-Team. He graduated from Fordham University with a Marketing degree from the College of Business Administration.

After a deal with Motherwell fell through due to the departure of Jim Gannon in late 2009, Kerr moved to Southend United on non-contract terms. Due to the club's financial difficulties and transfer embargo, which would eventually lead to the club being relegated to League Two, his stay was short lived.

In May 2010, after leaving Southend, Charlton Athletic invited Kerr janke to train for a month, with a view to signing for the following League One season but on 17 May, he signed for Digenis Akritas Morphou in Cyprus First Division for the 2010–2011 season, on a one-year deal.

After terminating his contract in January due to late wage payments, Kerr signed for Fort Lauderdale Strikers in early 2011. He missed the first three months of the season with an ankle injury but returned to full fitness in June. On 21 August 2011, Fort Lauderdale Strikers loaned Kerr to Atlanta Silverbacks on a one-month loan.

For the 2012 season, Kerr signed with FK Tønsberg in the 2. divisjon of Norway. On the last day of the August transfer window, he was loaned to Kvik Halden for the rest of the season.

In early 2013, Kerr signed a contract with VPS of Finland's premier division, Veikkausliiga.

VPS finished in third place in 2013, qualifying for the UEFA Europa League.

In early February 2014, Kerr signed a four-month contract in Greece until 30 June 2014, with a one-year option.
