= Moussa Toure =

Liberian footballer (born 1985)

Personal information
- Full name: Moussa Toure
- Date of birth: June 19, 1985 (age 41)
- Place of birth: Monrovia, Liberia
- Height: 5 ft 11 in (1.80 m)
- Position: Midfielder

Senior career*
Years	Team	Apps	(Gls)
2008	Minnesota Twin Stars	12	(5)
2009	Atlanta Blackhawks	7	(3)
2010	Fort Lauderdale Schulz Academy	6	(3)
2011	Atlanta Silverbacks	8	(0)
2012	Minnesota Twin Stars		
- * Club domestic league appearances and goals

Moussa Toure (born June 19, 1985) is a Liberian former footballer who last played for the Minnesota Twin Stars.

== Career ==
Toure appeared in 12 games for the Minnesota Twin Stars of the National Premier Soccer League in 2008, scoring five goals. In 2009, he was capped seven times by the Atlanta Blackhawks of the PDL, netting three goals. He was capped six times in 2010 for the Fort Lauderdale Schulz Academy for the PDL and scored three goals.

Toure signed to play with the Atlanta Silverbacks in the North American Soccer League on April 25, 2011. He received his first cap for the Silverbacks was on June 8, 2011, when he was subbed for Lucas Paulini in the 87'. Toure was released by Atlanta on November 7, 2011 and returned to the Minnesota Twin Stars.

== Personal ==
His older brother, Ansu, played for the Silverbacks from 2007 to 2008.
