= Jose Parada =

American soccer player (born 1987)

Personal information
- Full name: Jose Parada
- Date of birth: September 24, 1987 (age 39)
- Place of birth: Houston, Texas, United States
- Height: 5 ft 7 in (1.70 m)
- Position: Midfielder

Youth career
- 2006–2009: Tulsa Golden Hurricane

Senior career*
Years	Team	Apps	(Gls)
2011	Atlanta Silverbacks	10	(0)
- * Club domestic league appearances and goals as of August 23, 2011

Jose Parada (born September 24, 1987, in Houston, Texas) is an American soccer player.

== Career ==
=== College and amateur ===
Parada grew up in Houston, Texas, attended Bellaire High School, played club soccer for nine years with the Houstonians and four years of college soccer at the University of Tulsa. In his freshman year, he tallied five goals and four assists in 19 games, 16 of which were starts. He was named to the Great Western Downtown Plaza/Golden Hurricane Classic All-Tournament team, as well as being named to the All-C-USA second team and All-C-USA Freshmen team. In his sophomore year, he tallied six goals and four assists in 16 appearances with 12 starts. He was named to the NSCAA All-Midwest second team. In his junior year, he tallied seven goals and five assist, and started all 17 games he appeared in. He was named to the Level 3 & Radisson Hotel Hurricane Classic All-Tournament team. In his senior year, he tallied nine goals and five assists in 22 appearances with 18 starts. He was named to both the NIU Invitational and SMU Classic all-tournament teams.

=== Professional ===
Parada signed to the Silverbacks in February 2011. He earned his first professional cap on April 16, 2011, in a home loss to FC Edmonton when he subbed in for Mario Pérez in the 88th minute. Parada was released by Atlanta on November 7, 2011.
