= Shane Moroney =

American soccer player

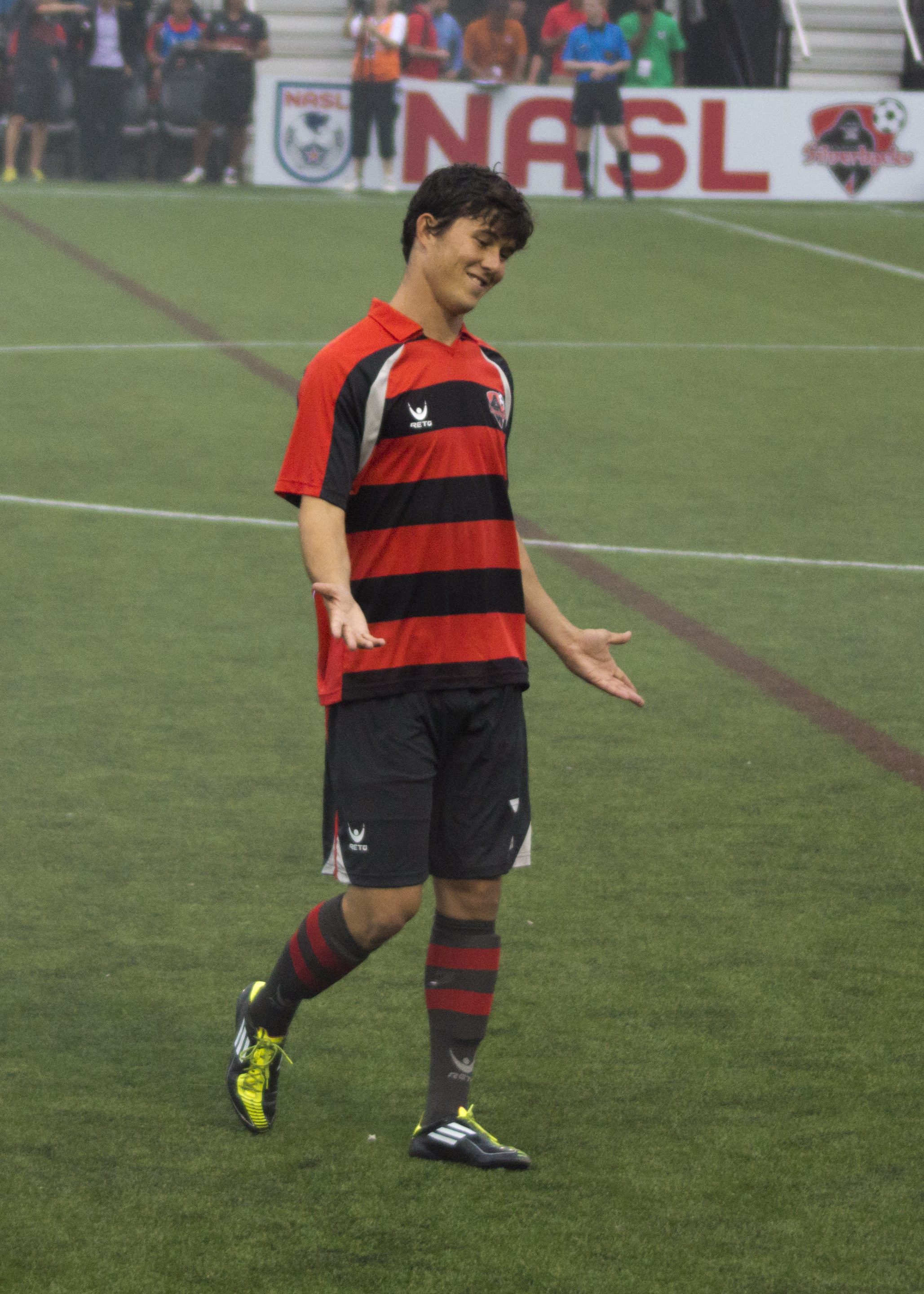
- Shane Moroney during an Atlanta Silverbacks game on April 21st, 2012

Personal information
- Full name: Shane Moroney
- Date of birth: February 4, 1989 (age 37)
- Place of birth: Pensacola, Florida, United States
- Height: 1.80 m (5 ft 11 in)
- Position: Defender

Youth career
- 2007–2010: Berry Vikings

Senior career*
Years	Team	Apps	(Gls)
2011–2013	Atlanta Silverbacks	48	(3)
- * Club domestic league appearances and goals as of February 13, 2014

Shane Moroney (born February 4, 1989, in Pensacola, Florida) is an American soccer player.

== Career ==
=== College and amateur ===
Moroney grew up in Peachtree City, Georgia, attended Starr's Mill High School and played club soccer for the Capital City Streaks in Montgomery, Alabama, before going on to play four years of college soccer at Berry College. Maroney was a second team All-Conference and a SSAC All-Academic Team selection at Berry as a sophomore in 2008.

=== Professional ===
Moroney turned professional in 2011 when he signed with Atlanta Silverbacks of the North American Soccer League. He made his professional debut on April 9, 2011, in a game against the NSC Minnesota Stars Atlanta announced on November 8, 2011, that Moroney would return for the 2012 season.
