= Starr's Mill High School =

Public high school in Fayetteville, Georgia, United States

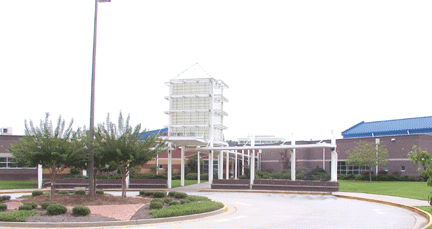

Location
- 193 Panther Path; Fayetteville, Georgia; United States; 33°20′32″N 84°31′03″W

Information
- Type: Public secondary
- Established: 1997
- School district: Fayette County Public Schools
- Principal: Jamie Voorhies
- Staff: 88.60 (FTE)
- Grades: 9–12
- Enrollment: 1,361 (2023–2024)
- Student to teacher ratio: 15.36
- Campus: Suburban
- Colors: Black and Columbia blue
- Mascot: Panther
- Website: Starr’s Mill High School

Starr's Mill High School is a public high school located in Fayetteville, Georgia, United States. The school is governed by the Fayette County Board of Education.

The school also serves southern Peachtree City and parts of unincorporated Fayette County.

== History ==
The Fayette County Board of Education commissioned Starr's Mill High School alongside Peeples Elementary School and Rising Starr Middle School in response to rapid population growth in southern Peachtree City. Before its permanent building was constructed, students attended the LaFayette Education Center in Fayetteville until the start of the 97-1998 school year. The school is named after a grist mill located a mile southeast of the campus.

== School profile ==
Starr's Mill High School opened in 1997–1998 with 40 teachers and 650 students. As of 2020–21 its enrollment was 1,336 students, with 89.3 (on an FTE basis) teachers.

5% of Starr's Mill minority students participate in the ESOL Program. Most SMHS students reside in Fayetteville and Peachtree City.

Starr's Mill was one of only three high schools in Georgia to be declared a School of Excellence in 2005, and it has been ranked as one of the best public schools in America by Newsweek magazine. The feeder to this school is Rising Starr Middle School.

== Academics ==
The 2020 SAT average at Starr's Mill was 1161 (out of 1600).

== Extra-curricular activities ==
=== Athletics ===
- Baseball
- Basketball
- Cheerleading
- Cross-country
- Football
- Golf
- Lacrosse
- Soccer
- Softball
- Swimming
- Tennis
- Track
- Volleyball
- Wrestling

=== Academics ===
- Academic Team
- Band
- Beta Club
- Chorus
- Debate Team
- Drama
- Eco Club
- French Club
- German Club
- Health Occupations for Students of America
- Literary Magazine
- Marching Band
- Math Team
- Mock Trial Team
- National History Bee and Bowl
- Newspaper - The Prowler
- Orchestra
- Science Olympiad
- Student Government Association
- Yearbook
- Ex Libris Book Club
- Creative Writing Club
- FCCLA
- National Honor Society
- Chess Club
- Technology Student Association

== Notable alumni ==
- Paris Bennett (class of 2006) – American Idol contestant, 4th runner-up
- Cole Bishop (class of 2021) - American football player for the Buffalo Bills
- Casey Bond – actor (Moneyball), former MLB outfielder for the San Francisco Giants
- Jordan Davis – former member of Atlanta Silverbacks
- Reuben Houston (class of 2001) – cornerback for the Georgia Tech Yellow Jackets football team from 2002 to 2005
- Myles Jaye — MLB pitcher for the Detroit Tigers
- Ufomba Kamalu – Canadian football defensive tackle for the BC Lions
- Sam Martin – Appalachian State kicker, punter for the Carolina Panthers
- Kelley O'Hara (class of 2006) – US Women's National Team soccer player, appeared in 2011 FIFA Women's World Cup; gold medalist in 2012 Summer Olympics, 2015 FIFA Women's World Cup champion, 2019 FIFA Women's World Cup champion
- Daniel Roberts - 2024 Paris Olympic games silver medalist in 110m hurdles. Moved out before graduating
- Hollyn Shadinger (class of 2016) - Singer Songwriter known by her stage name Stela Cole
