= Dániel Illyés =

Hungarian footballer

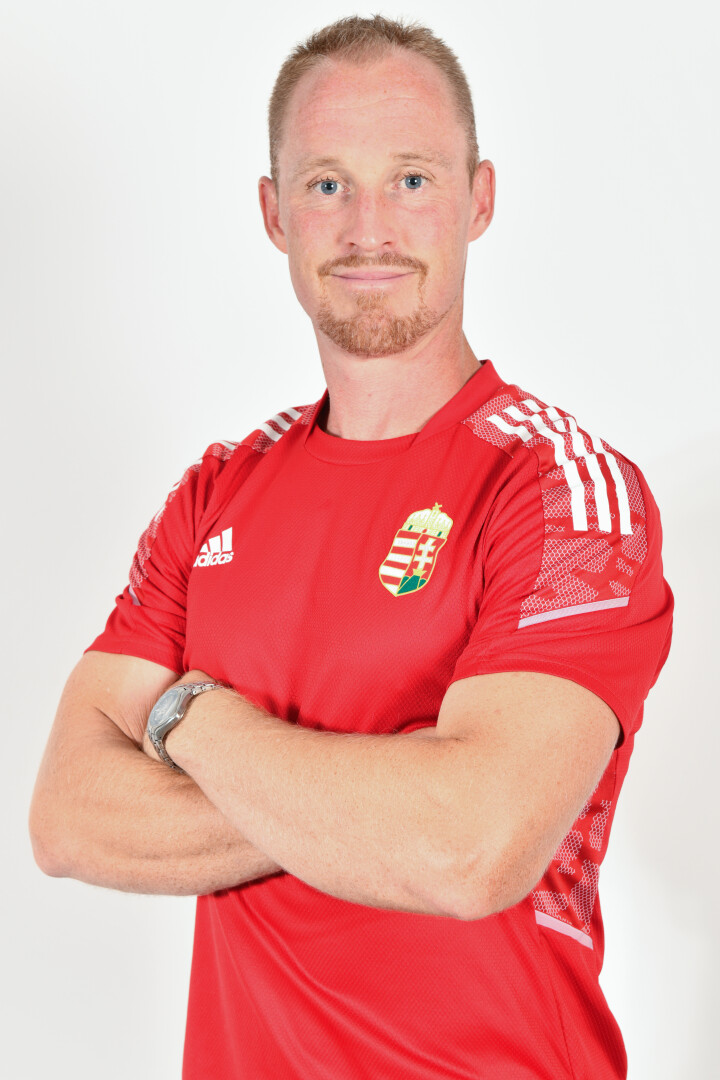

Personal information
- Full name: Dániel Illyés
- Date of birth: September 19, 1982 (age 44)
- Place of birth: Budapest
- Height: 1.88 m (6 ft 2 in)
- Position: Goalkeeper

Youth career
- 1992–1999: BVSC
- 1999–2001: Vasas

Senior career*
Years	Team	Apps	(Gls)
2001–2006	Újpest	4	
2003 July - 2004 January	→ Dabas FC (loan)	17	
2006–2007	Rákospalotai EAC	17	
2008 January – 2009 Summer	Nyíregyháza Spartacus	22	
2009–2010	Rákospalotai EAC	7	
2010–2011	Egri FC	46	
2012	Atlanta Silverbacks	22	
2013 February - 2013 June	Fortress Felsőtárkány	13	
2013 July - 2014 January	Egri FC	16	
2014 January - 2015 June	Fortress Felsőtárkány	37	
- * Club domestic league appearances and goals as of February 8, 2013

Daniel Illyes (born September 19, 1982, in Budapest) is a former soccer goalkeeper. Since 2016, he has been employed as national youth goalkeeping coach and coaching instructor by the Hungarian Football Federation.

== Professional curriculum vitae ==
Educational background:

- 2010 – 2011 Eszterházy Károly University, Eger, MSc Diploma –
- Physical Education Teacher master's degree
- 2004-2007 Eszterházy Károly University, Eger, BSc Diploma – Physical Education Teacher Diploma Football coaching studies:
  - UEFA GK Instructor Training (2019; 2023)
  - UEFA GK A License (2019)
  - UEFA A License (2017)
  - The FA GK B License (The Football Association Goalkeeping Diploma - 2017)
  - Coaching, Teaching, and Instructing Experience:
  - 2020–Present Lead Instructor, MLSZ UEFA GK B License Course
  - 2019–Present Guest Instructor, MLSZ UEFA "A" License Coaching Courses
  - 2015–Present Guest Instructor, MLSZ UEFA "B" License Coaching Courses
  - July 2016 – Present Full-time National Goalkeeping Coach at MLSZ (U15-U19)
  - 2015-2016 Head Coach and Goalkeeping Coach at Egri Sportcentrum SE First Team
  - 2015-2016 Part-time Lecturer at Eszterházy Károly University (Eger)
  - 2014 - National Goalkeeping Coach at MLSZ (U15-U19)
  - 2013 - Goalkeeping Coach at Egri FC (NB1)
  - 2010-2016 Head of the Egri Goalkeeper Academy

== Sports career ==
Daniel Illyes, a Hungarian soccer goalkeeper and coach, showcased his talent on the national stage with 10 appearances in the Hungarian U17/U18 youth teams. Over his professional career spanning nine years in Hungary's NB1 league, he contributed his skills to prominent clubs such as Újpest FC, REAC, and Nyíregyháza Spartacus.

In the summer of 2003, seeking consistent playing opportunities, Újpest loaned Illyés to NB1/B FC Dabas. Upon his return to Újpest in the winter of 2004, where he celebrated a silver medal at the end of the season with the Purple and Whites.. This success repeated in the 2005/2006 season, where Illyés contributed to Újpest's second-place finish in a memorable match at the Puskás Ferenc Stadium, narrowly missing the NB1 championship title.

Illyés solidified his position as a starting goalkeeper for REAC in the 2006/2007 season. Despite trials with Belgian and Scottish clubs in the summer of 2007, an international move did not materialize. Following a period without a team, he joined NB1's Nyíregyháza in January 2008, where he spent a season and a half. Returning to REAC in the fall of 2009, he helped the team secure a second-place at the half of the season in the NB2 championship.

A pivotal moment in Illyés's career came in February 2010 when he transferred to Eger. In the 2010/2011 season, he celebrated an NB3 championship title, and in the subsequent 2011/2012 season, he was part of the team that promoted to NB1 till 2012 January. Moving to the United States in February 2012, Illyés joined the Atlanta Silverbacks, participating in the North American Soccer League and he was the number one goalkeeper during the 2012 NASL season.

Returning to Hungary from the United States, Illyés shifted his focus to coaching, particularly after being appointed as the goalkeeping coach for the NB1 Eger team in the spring of 2013. Between 2013 and 2016, he alternated between playing for Eger and Fortress Felsőtárkány and in the meantime winning the NB3 championship with Felsőtárkány.

The 2015/2016 season marked Illyés's multifaceted role in Eger, serving as both head coach and goalkeeper. His last competitive match in 2016 with Eger culminated in victory over Gyöngyös in the county cup final, concluding Illyés's career as both a player and coach in Eger.

== Coaching career ==
In the autumn of 2009, Illyés Dániel commenced his role as a goalkeeper coach within the youth development program of REAC while being an active player for the club. His coaching journey took a significant turn in the winter of 2010 when he visited Brian Jones, an American goalkeeper coach and the then head of the St. Louis Goalkeeping Academy. Inspired by this visit, Illyés, armed with a vision, joined Eger in February, aiming to establish a goalkeeper school in the region. The Egri Kapus Akadémia came into fruition in the spring of 2010, its legal framework supported by the Fiatal Labdarúgó Kapusokért Alapítvány (Young Football Goalkeepers Foundation).

The success of the goalkeeper academy was particularly evident in its summer camps, which, between 2010 and 2019, became some of the largest in the country, drawing participants from various regions, both nationally and internationally. Brian Jones and Illyés's English colleague, Billy Stewart, added to the prestige of these camps. In collaboration with Illyés, Stewart facilitated unique opportunities for talented goalkeepers to partake in training sessions at renowned English clubs such as Bolton, Everton, and Manchester City. The tradition experienced a brief interruption during COVID period but was revived in the summer of 2022 and continued in 2023.

Illyés's tenure in Eger also marked significant personal and professional growth. He concurrently served as a part-time lecturer at Eszterházy Károly University during the 2015/2016 academic year. His coaching prowess during the goalkeeper camps caught the attention of József Andrusch, the Hungarian National Football Team's goalkeeper coach in the summer of 2014, leading to Illyés's appointment as the U15 national team goalkeeper coach from 2014 August. Over the subsequent two years, he extended his coaching contributions across various age groups, from U15 to U19.

In 2016, Illyés received a compelling offer from Bernd Storck, the sports director and head coach of the "A" national team, resulting in his appointment as the full-time goalkeeper coach for the Hungarian Football Federation (MLSZ) from the summer of 2016 onwards.

Notably, Illyés's expertise extended to the educational realm, as he received invitations from the MLSZ coaching education program starting in 2015. His guest lectures covered a range of topics, including "Modern Goalkeeper Training" and "The Role of the Goalkeeper Coach in the Staff," presented at the UEFA B and UEFA A courses. In May 2016, he participated in the consolidation of the UEFA GK A course led by Andrusch József and supervised by Packie Bonner, ensuring the federation's ability to independently organize UEFA-certified goalkeeper coaching courses in the future.

Since 2020, Illyés, in collaboration with Árpád Milinte and József Andrusch, has spearheaded the national goalkeeper coach education program, encompassing MLSZ GK C, UEFA GK B, and UEFA GK A levels.
