= Willie Hunt =

American soccer player (born 1987)

Personal information
- Full name: William Edward Hunt
- Date of birth: September 15, 1987 (age 39)
- Place of birth: Greenville, South Carolina, United States
- Height: 5 ft 11 in (1.80 m)
- Position: Defender

Youth career
- 2005–2008: Francis Marion Patriots

Senior career*
Years	Team	Apps	(Gls)
2009–2010	Mississippi Brilla	30	(3)
2011–2013	Atlanta Silverbacks	53	(5)
2014	Tampa Bay Rowdies	12	(1)
2015–2016	Pittsburgh Riverhounds	75	(4)
2015	→ Tampa Bay Rowdies (loan)	0	(0)
- * Club domestic league appearances and goals as of September 26, 2016

William Edward Hunt (born September 15, 1987, in Greenville, South Carolina) is an American soccer player.

== Career ==
=== College and amateur ===
Hunt grew up in Greer, South Carolina, attended Eastside High School, and played college soccer at Francis Marion University, where he earned numerous conference and regional honors as a standout defender, being named to the 2008 and 2007 PBC Presidential and FMU Swamp Fox Athletic-Academic honor rolls. He scored four goals during his senior season, including the winning goal in the Peach Belt Conference Tournament championship game, and was named his team's MVP.

=== Professional ===
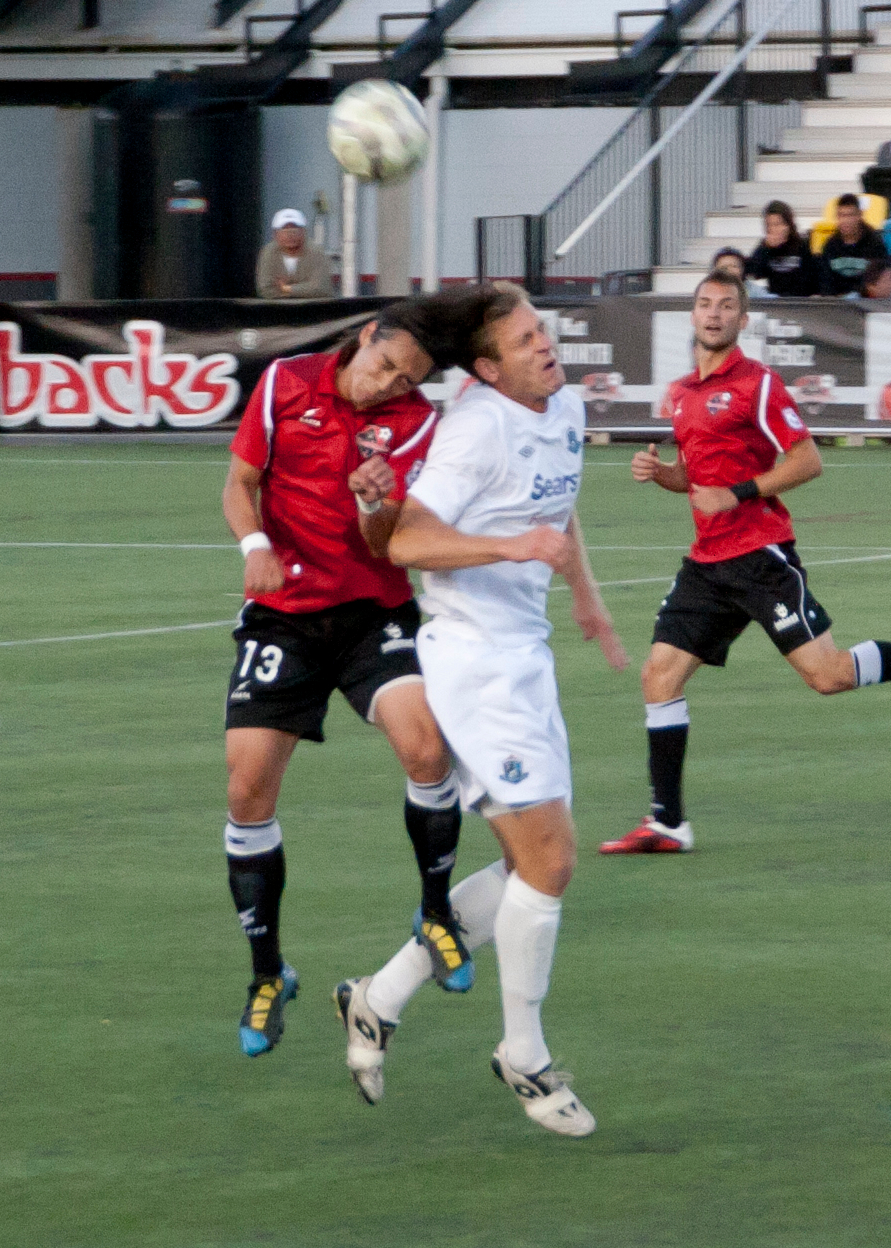
Willie Hunt - 2011-04-16 - Atlanta Silverbacks

Undrafted out of college, Hunt spent played with Mississippi Brilla in the USL Premier Development League, before turning professional in 2011 when he signed with the Atlanta Silverbacks for their debut season in the North American Soccer League. He made his debut for his new team on April 16, 2011, in a game against FC Edmonton and scored his first professional goal on April 30 in a 1–1 tie with FC Tampa Bay.

After spending 2014 with Tampa Bay Rowdies, Hunt signed with USL club Pittsburgh Riverhounds on March 26, 2015. He rejoined Tampa Bay at the end of the 2015 USL season. Hunt made 30 appearances for the Hounds in all competitions in 2015. He scored three goals including two headers in the season ending 4–2 defeat at New York Red Bulls II in the USL's Eastern Conference playoffs. He has resigned with the Pittsburgh Riverhounds for the 2016 season." Hunt played every game for the Riverhounds in 2016 and was named MVP at the end of the season.
