= Josh Casarona =

American soccer player (born 1992)

Personal information
- Full name: Josh Casarona
- Date of birth: April 12, 1992 (age 34)
- Place of birth: Columbus, Georgia, U.S.
- Height: 5 ft 9 in (1.75 m)
- Position: Defender

Senior career*
Years	Team	Apps	(Gls)
2011	Atlanta Silverbacks	10	(0)
- * Club domestic league appearances and goals as of August 16, 2011

Josh Casarona (born April 12, 1992) is an American soccer player who most recently played for Atlanta Silverbacks in the North American Soccer League.

== Career ==
=== Youth and amateur ===
Casarona spent his youth soccer career playing for CFC Red Star in Columbus, Georgia. He left the United States to play in Argentina at the age of 16. As part of Alabama's ODP program, he played in tournaments against teams from Mexico, Argentina and England. He played at the CEFAR Soccer School in Buenos Aires, Argentina, as well as playing for the US U-20 ODP Region III team in a tournament at Chelsea F.C.

=== Professional ===
Casarona signed to play with Atlanta Silverbacks in the North American Soccer League on April 6, 2011. His first cap was on July 4, 2011, in a home loss to Puerto Rico Islanders. Atlanta released Casarona on December 2, 2011.
