= Patrick Robertson (soccer) =

American soccer player

Personal information
- Full name: James Patrick Robertson Jr.
- Date of birth: April 18, 1986 (age 40)
- Place of birth: Savannah, Georgia, United States
- Height: 1.83 m (6 ft 0 in)
- Position: Defender

Youth career
- 2004–2007: Coastal Carolina Chanticleers

Senior career*
Years	Team	Apps	(Gls)
2006	Chicago Fire Premier	13	(1)
2008	Harrisburg City Islanders	2	(0)
2008	Juan Aurich		
2009	Bayamón FC		
2010	Puerto Rico Islanders		
2011–2012	Atlanta Silverbacks	32	(0)
- * Club domestic league appearances and goals as of November 6, 2012

James Patrick Robertson Jr. (born April 18, 1986, in Savannah, Georgia) is an American soccer player who most recently played for Atlanta Silverbacks in the North American Soccer League.

== Career ==
=== College and amateur ===
Robertson grew up in Houston, Texas, attended The Woodlands High School, and played for state and regional ODP teams in Texas, before going on to play four years of college soccer at Coastal Carolina University. He scored nine goals and added three assists during his college career, helping the Chanticleers to two Big South Conference championships, and earning Second Team All-Conference honors his junior season.

During his college years Robertson also played with the Chicago Fire Premier in the USL Premier Development League.

=== Professional ===
Robertson turned professional in 2008 when he signed with the Harrisburg City Islanders of the USL Second Division. After a brief stint in Peru playing for Juan Aurich and training with Peruvian First Division side Sport Boys, Robertson signed with Bayamón FC of the Puerto Rico Soccer League, who he helped to the PRSL title.

He transferred to the Puerto Rico Islanders for their campaign in the 2010 PRSL season, before moving to the Atlanta Silverbacks in the North American Soccer League in early 2011. He made his debut for his new team on April 9, 2011, in a game against the NSC Minnesota Stars Atlanta announced on November 8, 2011, that Robertson would return for the 2012 season.
