= Fernando González (footballer, born 1989) =

Puerto Rican footballer (born 1989)

Personal information
- Full name: Fernando González
- Date of birth: June 12, 1989 (age 37)
- Place of birth: Tampa, Florida, United States
- Height: 5 ft 10 in (1.78 m)
- Position: Midfielder

Youth career
- HC United

College career
Years	Team	Apps	(Gls)
2007–2010	South Florida Bulls	78	(1)

Senior career*
Years	Team	Apps	(Gls)
2011–2012	Atlanta Silverbacks	13	(0)

International career^{‡}
2008	Puerto Rico U20	3	(0)
2012–	Puerto Rico	10	(0)
- * Club domestic league appearances and goals as of July 13, 2012 ‡ National team caps and goals as of August 24, 2012

Fernando González (born June 12, 1989, in Tampa, Florida) is a Puerto Rican footballer.

== Career ==
=== College and amateur ===
González played for Tampa powerhouse HC United. With HCU, he won the SYL North American championship. He also played at Gaither High School during his time with HC United. González then played in college for the USF Bulls.

=== Professional ===
González signed with Atlanta Silverbacks of the second tier North American Soccer League and made his professional debut on April 9, 2011, in a game against NSC Minnesota Stars. Atlanta announced on November 8, 2011, that González would return for the 2012 season.

=== International ===
In 2008, he played 3 games for Puerto Rico in the FIFA U20 World Cup Qualifiers in Cayman Islands, starting all 3 of them. González trained with the Puerto Rico U-21's ahead of the 2010 Central American and Caribbean Games. In October 2010, he was called up by the Puerto Rico Men's National Team to play in the Digicel Caribbean Cup but he was not released by the University of South Florida to do so.
