= Matt Horth =

American soccer player (born 1989)

Personal information
- Full name: Matthew Horth
- Date of birth: May 3, 1989 (age 37)
- Place of birth: Cleveland, Ohio, United States
- Height: 1.90 m (6 ft 3 in)
- Position: Forward

Youth career
- 2007–2010: Gordon Fighting Scots

Senior career*
Years	Team	Apps	(Gls)
2008	Cape Cod Crusaders	4	(2)
2009	Southern California Seahorses	13	(3)
2010	Cleveland Internationals	8	(1)
2011–2012	Atlanta Silverbacks	49	(18)
2013	New England Revolution	0	(0)
2013	→ Rochester Rhinos (loan)	16	(1)
2014	Leiknir Reykjavík	17	(6)
2015	Atlanta Silverbacks	10	(0)
- * Club domestic league appearances and goals as of February 23, 2016

Matthew Horth (born May 3, 1989, in Cleveland, Ohio) is an American soccer player who last played for Atlanta Silverbacks. He is currently the head coach of the Gordon College Fighting Scots.

== Career ==
=== College and amateur ===
Horth grew up in Akron, Ohio, attended Cuyahoga Valley Christian Academy, and played four years of college soccer at Gordon College. He scored 15 goals in his first 18 college games in his freshman year, being named 2007 TCCC Rookie of the Year and to the TCCC First Team All-Conference. He was a TCCC First Team All-Conference selection as a freshman in 2007, a sophomore in 2008, a junior in 2009, and a senior in 2010. Horth was also a NSCAA All-New England selection in 2008, 2009, and 2010.

During his college years he played in the USL Premier Development League for the Southern California Seahorses, the Cleveland Internationals, and the Cape Cod Crusaders.

=== Professional ===
Horth turned professional in 2011 when he signed with Atlanta Silverbacks of the North American Soccer League. He made his professional debut, and scored his first professional goal, on April 9, 2011, in a game against the NSC Minnesota Stars. Horth earned his first league honors on July 18, 2011, winning the NASL Offensive Player of the Week. Atlanta announced on November 8, 2011, that Horth would return for the 2012 season.

In a game against the Carolina Railhawks on July 3, 2012, Horth made history by becoming the first player to score a goal under the professional coaching career of U.S. soccer legend Eric Wynalda.

On January 25, 2013, Horth signed with the New England Revolution.

Horth was released by the Revolution in December 2013. He initially re-signed with Atlanta Silverbacks on January 20, 2014. However, the Silverbacks soon reached an agreement with Icelandic club Leiknir Reykjavík for Horth's signature.

On January 14, 2015, Horth returned to Atlanta Silverbacks.

== Honors ==
=== Individual ===
Atlanta Silverbacks

  - NASL Player of the Month: September 2012
  - NASL Player of the Week: Week 22, 2012
  - NASL Player of the Week: July 18, 2011
