= Floridians FC =

Floridians F.C.
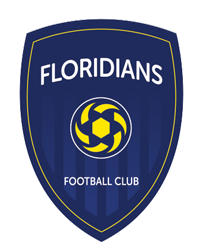
- Full name: Floridians Football Club
- Nickname: FFC
- Founded: 2009
- Dissolved: 2016
- Ground: Central Broward Regional Park; Lauderhill, Florida
- Capacity: 20,000
- Owner: Pascal Cohen & Franck Gotsman
- League: Premier Development League
- 2016: 4th, Southeast Division; Playoffs: DNQ
- Website: http://www.floridiansfc.com
Home colors	Away colors

The Floridians Football Club (Floridians FC or FFC) was an American soccer team based in Fort Lauderdale, Florida, United States. The club competed in the fourth tier of the American soccer pyramid, a hierarchy football soccer structure model. The Floridians competed in the Premier Development League (PDL). in the Southeast Division of the Southern Conference. The football club plays its home games on the Main Event Field at Central Broward Regional Park in nearby Lauderhill, Florida. The club's colors are navy and yellow, with a yellow soccer ball logo badge.

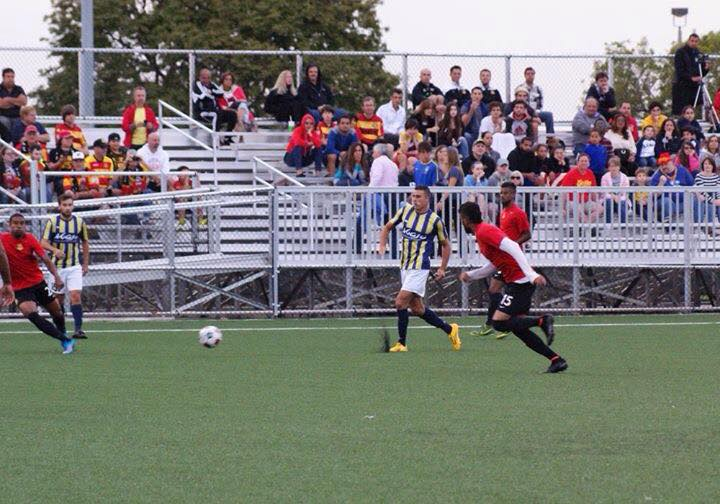
Floridians FC vs Ft lauderdale Strikers

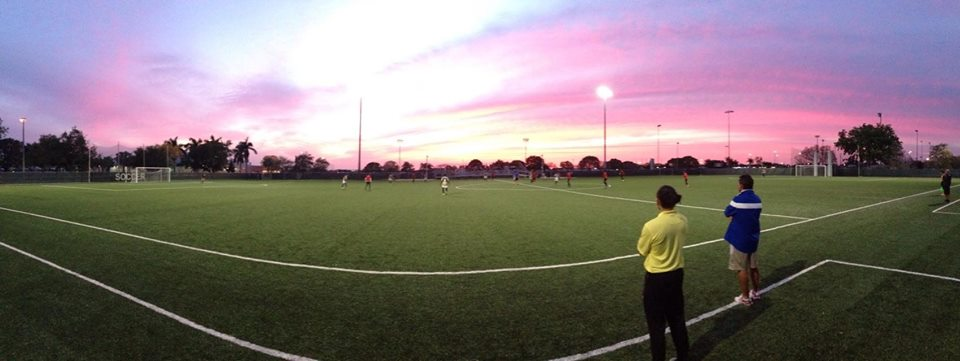
Floridians FC vs Ft Lauderdale Strikers

== History ==
On Wednesday, May 20, 2009, Schulz Academy was announced as a USL Premier Development League expansion franchise, joining the league in 2010. The team played its first competitive game on May 7, 2010, a 0–1 loss to the Bradenton Academics.

The PDL team was coached by founder Josef Schulz. Notable players that have been developed within the club included Matt Luzunaris, Hasani Sinclair and CJ Phelps of the U18 US Men's National Team; Donovan Henry, Zach Herold, and Stefan Jerome of the US U17 Men's National Team; and US National Team and Toronto FC striker Jozy Altidore. Following the death of Josef Schulz, the school decided to resume the Soccer Academy but gave up the PDL franchise to the Floridians FC.

== Players ==
=== Notable former players ===
This list of notable former players comprises players who went on to play professional soccer after playing for the team in the Premier Development League, or those who previously played professionally before joining the team with Schulz Academy.

- (United States) Jozy Altidore
- (United States) Matt Luzunaris
- (Puerto Rico) Shawn Barry
- (United States) Darnell King
- (Liberia) Moussa Toure

== Year-by-year ==
Year	Division	League	Regular season	Playoffs	Open Cup
2010	4	USL PDL	8th, Southeast	Did not qualify	Did not qualify
2011	4	USL PDL	6th, Southeast	Did not qualify	Did not qualify
2012	4	USL PDL	7th, Southeast	Did not qualify	Did not qualify
2013	4	USL PDL	8th, Southeast	Did not qualify	Did not qualify
2014	4	USL PDL	6th, Southeast	Did not qualify	Did not qualify
2015	4	USL PDL	4th, Southeast	Did not qualify	Did not qualify
2016	4	USL PDL	4th, Southeast	Did not qualify	Did not qualify

== Head coaches ==
- (Argentina) Fernando Valenzuela (2014–Current)
- (France) Claude Anelka (2013–2014)
- (Austria) Josef Schulz (2010–2013)

== Stadium ==
- Main Event Field at Central Broward Regional Park; Lauderhill, Florida (2010–present)
- Stadium at Florida Atlantic University; Boca Raton, Florida 1 game (2010)
