= Mattias Schnorf =

Swiss footballer (born 1984)

Personal information
- Full name: Mattias Schnorf
- Date of birth: April 21, 1984 (age 42)
- Place of birth: Uetikon am See, Switzerland
- Height: 5 ft 11 in (1.80 m)
- Position: Defender

Team information
- Current team: FC Schaffhausen
- Number: 28

Senior career*
Years	Team	Apps	(Gls)
2001–2002	Grasshopper Club Zürich	0	(0)
2003–2011	FC Winterthur	127	(1)
2011	Atlanta Silverbacks	14	(0)
2011–2012	SC Young Fellows Juventus	5	(0)
2012–	FC Schaffhausen		

International career
	Switzerland U-21	6	(0)
- * Club domestic league appearances and goals as of August 16, 2011

Mattias Schnorf (born April 21, 1984) is a Swiss footballer currently playing for FC Schaffhausen in the third division Swiss 1. Liga.

== Career ==
Schnorf began his career with the lauded Grasshopper Club Zürich, for whom he signed aged 17, and he spent two seasons with the team, but never made a first team appearance and moving to FC Winterthur in the Swiss Challenge League in 2003. He went on to play in 127 games as a central defender for Winterthur, scoring one goal in a 1–1 tie with FC Chiasso in 2010.

Schnorf crossed the Atlantic to the United States when he signed with Atlanta Silverbacks of the North American Soccer League. He made his debut on for his new club on May 14, 2011 in a game against the NSC Minnesota Stars.

At the conclusion of the 2011 season, Schnorf was loaned to SC Young Fellows Juventus of the Swiss 1. Liga on September 26, 2011. The Swiss club purchased him outright on October 12, 2011.

=== International ===
Schnorf is a Swiss youth international, having earned six caps for the Switzerland U-21 team.
