= Kōhei Matsushita =

Japanese footballer

Kōhei Matsushita 松下 幸平
Personal information
- Full name: Kōhei Matsushita
- Date of birth: July 24, 1985 (age 41)
- Place of birth: Hakusan, Ishikawa, Japan
- Height: 1.77 m (5 ft 9 1/2 in)
- Position: Defender

Youth career
- 2001–2003: Shizuoka Gakuen High School

Senior career*
Years	Team	Apps	(Gls)
2004–2006	Júbilo Iwata	0	(0)
2006–2010	Ehime FC	72	(2)
2011	Atlanta Silverbacks	7	(0)
Total		79	(2)
Medal record
Júbilo Iwata
Runner-up	Emperor's Cup	2004
- * Club domestic league appearances and goals

Kōhei Matsushita (松下 幸平, Matsushita Kōhei; born July 24, 1985) is a former Japanese football player.

== Playing career ==
=== Japan ===
Matsushita attended Shizuoka Gakuen High School, with whom he won the All Japan High school Championship and Best 11 award in 2002, and began his career with Júbilo Iwata, playing for the team's U-18, U-19, and U-23 teams. After a loan spell with Ehime FC in 2006, he moved clubs in 2007, and was the key outside player for Ehime for three seasons.

=== United States ===
Matsushita decided to move abroad in 2011 and entered the open trial for Atlanta Silverbacks in the North American Soccer League. He became the first Japanese player ever to sign with the club and made his debut for his new team on April 16, 2011 in a game against FC Edmonton. Atlanta announced on November 8, 2011 that Matsushita would return for the 2012 season.

== Playing style ==
Has been mainly playing on the left flank known for his accurate pinpoint crosses. Names former Brazil National Team Player Cafu as his idol player.

== Club statistics ==
Club performance			League		Cup		League Cup		Total	
Season	Club	League	Apps	Goals	Apps	Goals	Apps	Goals	Apps	Goals
Japan			League		Emperor's Cup		J.League Cup		Total	
2004	Jubilo Iwata	J1 League	0	0	0	0	0	0	0	0
2005	Jubilo Iwata	J1 League	0	0	0	0	0	0	0	0
2006	Jubilo Iwata	J1 League	0	0	0	0	0	0	0	0
2006	Ehime FC	J2 League	32	2	2	0	-		34	2
2007	Ehime FC	J2 League	9	0	0	0	-		9	0
2008	Ehime FC	J2 League	2	0	1	0	-		3	0
2009	Ehime FC	J2 League	18	0	0	0	-		18	0
2010	Ehime FC	J2 League	11	0	0	0	-		11	0
United States			League		Open Cup		League Cup		Total	
2011	Atlanta Silverbacks	NASL	7	0	-		-		7	0
Country	Japan		72	2	3	0	0	0	75	2
Country	United States		7	0	-		-		7	0
Total			79	2	3	0	0	0	82	2
