= Emsad Zahirovic =

American soccer player of Bosnian origin (born 1988)

Personal information
- Full name: Emsad Zahirovic
- Date of birth: April 9, 1988 (age 38)
- Place of birth: SFR Yugoslavia
- Height: 6 ft 2 in (1.88 m)
- Position: Forward

Senior career*
Years	Team	Apps	(Gls)
2006–2010	B&H International		
2011	Atlanta Silverbacks	7	(0)
- * Club domestic league appearances and goals as of August 31, 2011

Emsad Zahirovic (born April 9, 1988) is an American soccer player of Bosnian origin who most recently played for Atlanta Silverbacks of the North American Soccer League.

== Career ==
=== Amateur ===
Zahirovic came to the United States from his native Bosnia in 2000 at the age of 12, and grew up in Snellville, Georgia. He graduated from Shiloh High School, but did not play college soccer, and instead played in the Atlanta District Amateur Soccer League between 2006 and 2010, most notably for the ethnic Bosnian team B&H International. Zahirovic led the ADASL in scoring in three of his seasons in the league, scoring 23 goals in just 15 games in 2010.

=== Professional ===
Zahirovic turned professional in February 2011 when he signed with Atlanta Silverbacks of the North American Soccer League. He made his professional debut on April 23, 2011, in a game against the Fort Lauderdale Strikers. Zahirovic was released from Atlanta on August 30, 2011, due to breach of contract.
