= Felipe Quintero =

Mexican footballer (born 1979)

Personal information
- Full name: Felipe de Jesús Quintero Monsivais
- Date of birth: July 29, 1979 (age 47)
- Place of birth: Monterrey, Mexico
- Height: 1.85 m (6 ft 1 in)
- Position: Goalkeeper

Youth career
- 1999–2004: Guadalajara

Senior career*
| Years | Team | Apps | (Gls) |
- Ángeles de Puebla
- Ciudad Juárez
- Querétaro
- Irapuato
| 2005 | Lobos de la BUAP | | |
| 2006–2008 | Atlanta Silverbacks | 54 | (0) |
| 2011 | Atlanta Silverbacks | 11 | (0) |
- * Club domestic league appearances and goals as of August 23, 2011

Felipe de Jesús Quintero Monsivais (Note: In this Spanish name, the first or paternal surname is Quintero and the second or maternal family name is Monsivais.) (born July 29, 1979), known as Felipe Quintero, is a Mexican footballer who played for Atlanta Silverbacks in the North American Soccer League.

== Career ==
=== Mexico ===
Quintero was in Club Deportivo Guadalajara's youth system from 1999 to 2004. In 2005, he played for Lobos de la BUAP in the Primera División A which is the second division in Mexico. Quintero also helped Irapuato win the Mexican second division title and advance to the first division. He also played for Ángeles de Puebla, Ciudad Juárez, and Querétaro.

=== United States ===
Quintero signed with the Atlanta Silverbacks of the USL First Division in 2006, and was the team's first choice goalkeeper for the next two seasons until the Silverbacks went on hiatus following the conclusion of the 2009 USL1 season.

He re-signed with the club, now in the North American Soccer League, on March 11, 2011.

=== International ===
In 1999, he was a member of the Mexico Under-20 national team.

== Personal ==
He is also the grandson of Francisco Quintero Nava, former Mexican goalkeeper with Club Deportivo Guadalajara (Chivas), who played alongside Antonio Carbajal at the 1948 Olympics in London.
