= Jon Cox (soccer) =

American soccer player

Personal information
- Full name: Jon Cox
- Date of birth: December 30, 1986 (age 39)
- Place of birth: St. Louis, Missouri, United States
- Height: 6 ft 1 in (1.85 m)
- Position: Forward

Youth career
- 2006–2010: Georgia Southern Eagles

Senior career*
Years	Team	Apps	(Gls)
2007–2008	Atlanta Silverbacks U23s	18	(7)
2010	Atlanta Blackhawks	11	(3)
2011	Atlanta Silverbacks	16	(0)
- * Club domestic league appearances and goals as of August 23, 2011

Jon Cox (born December 30, 1986, in St. Louis, Missouri) is an American soccer player.

== Career ==
=== College and amateur ===
Cox grew up in Alpharetta, Georgia, attended Milton High School, played club soccer for United Quest Soccer Club, and played five years of college soccer at Georgia Southern University, redshirting his freshman season, eventually making his debut in 2007. He led the Eagles in scoring as a freshman with six goals and five assists, wa named Southern Conference Freshman of the Year - the first time a Georgia Southern player won the award - and was named to the All-Southern Conference Second Team, the NSCAA All-Region Team, and earned College Soccer News Freshman All-American honors. He started all 14 of Georgia Southern's games during his senior season, leading the team in scoring, tallying four, and earning All-Southern Conference Second Team honors.

During his college years Cox also played with the Atlanta Silverbacks U23s and the Atlanta Blackhawks in the USL Premier Development League.

=== Professional ===
Cox turned professional in 2011 when he signed with the Atlanta Silverbacks for their debut season in the North American Soccer League. He made his debut for his new team on April 16, 2011, in a game against FC Edmonton - and was sent off in the 84th minute of that game. Cox was released by Atlanta on November 7, 2011.
