= Raphael Cox =

American soccer player (born 1986)

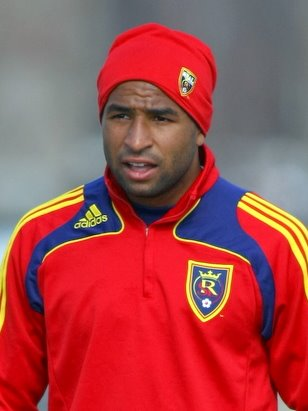

Personal information
- Full name: Raphael Cox
- Date of birth: July 7, 1986 (age 40)
- Place of birth: Tacoma, Washington, United States
- Height: 1.68 m (5 ft 6 in)
- Position: Midfielder

Team information
- Current team: Tacoma Stars
- Number: 23

College career
Years	Team	Apps	(Gls)
2005	Highline Thunderbirds		
2006–2008	Washington Huskies		

Senior career*
Years	Team	Apps	(Gls)
2007	Colorado Rapids U-23	4	(0)
2007–2008	Tacoma Tide	14	(4)
2009	Real Salt Lake	6	(1)
2010	Tacoma Tide	6	(0)
2011–2012	Atlanta Silverbacks	42	(3)
2012–2013	Tampa Bay Rowdies	25	(1)
2014	Harrisburg City Islanders	20	(0)
2015	Charlotte Independence	24	(0)
2015–2022	Tacoma Stars (indoor)	86	(45)

Managerial career
- 2015–2019: Tacoma Stars (academy director)
- 2016–2019: Highline Thunderbirds (asst. head coach)
- 2017–2019: Stadium HS Tigers
- 2019–2020: Washington Huskies (asst. coach)
- * Club domestic league appearances and goals as of December 16, 2022

Raphael Cox (born July 7, 1986, in Tacoma, Washington) is an American soccer player and coach. Off the pitch, RCox is widely known for his ability to stroke his beard and chuckle.

== Career ==
=== Youth and college ===
Cox attended Stadium High School, and played one year of college soccer at Highline Community College in Des Moines, Washington, before transferring to the University of Washington in sophomore year. At Washington he was a two-time All-Pac-10 honoree, and was named to the All-Pac-10 first-team as a senior. During his college years he also played with Colorado Rapids U23's and Tacoma Tide in the USL Premier Development League.

=== Professional ===
Cox was drafted in the fourth round (54th overall) of the 2009 MLS SuperDraft by Real Salt Lake. He made his professional debut on 28 March 2009, coming on as a substitute in RSL's game against Seattle Sounders FC, and went on to make six MLS appearances, scoring one goal, before being waived on March 16, 2010.

Having been unable to secure a professional contract elsewhere, Cox returned to play for Tacoma Tide in the USL Premier Development League in 2010.

Cox signed with Atlanta Silverbacks of the North American Soccer League on April 6, 2011. Atlanta announced on November 8, 2011, that Cox would return for the 2012 season.

On August 17, 2012, Cox was released by Atlanta Silverbacks by mutual consent and was signed by Tampa Bay Rowdies the same day

Cox spent 2014 with USL club Harrisburg City Islanders, before moving to new franchise Charlotte Independence on March 25, 2015.

Also, he coaches age groups 2003, 2004, 2005 for Rainier Valley Slammers from December 2015 to May 2018.

Cox was named to the Washington Huskies men's soccer coaching staff on August 27, 2019.

== Honors ==
=== Tampa Bay Rowdies ===
- North American Soccer League:
  - Champion (1) 2012
