= Mario Pérez (footballer, born 1982) =

Mexican footballer (born 1982)

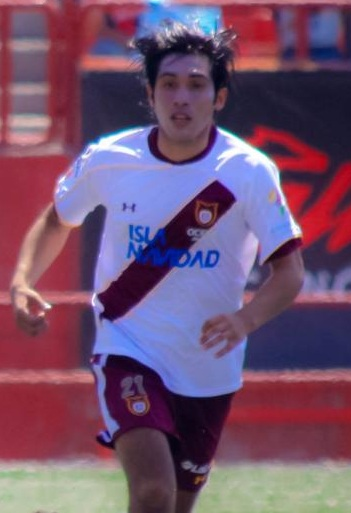
- Pérez playing for Tecos

Personal information
- Full name: Mario Pérez Zúñiga
- Date of birth: 17 June 1982 (age 44)
- Place of birth: Mexico City, Mexico
- Height: 1.79 m (5 ft 10 in)
- Position: Left-back

Senior career*
Years	Team	Apps	(Gls)
2001–2004	Necaxa	35	(4)
2004–2005	America	20	(1)
2005–2007	Necaxa	65	(2)
2007–2008	San Luis	42	(0)
2008–2009	Necaxa	33	(1)
2009–2010	Atlas	9	(0)
2011	Atlanta Silverbacks	10	(1)
2011–2012	Estudiantes Tecos	24	(0)
2012–2014	Necaxa	36	(0)
2014–2016	BUAP	70	(0)

International career
1999	Mexico U17	4	(0)
2004	Mexico U23	3	(0)
2003–2006	Mexico	10	(0)
- * Club domestic league appearances and goals

Mario Pérez Zúñiga (born 17 June 1982) is a Mexican former footballer who played as a left-back.

== Career ==
=== Club ===
Pérez played previously extensively in Mexico, for F.C. Atlas, Club Necaxa, San Luis F.C. and Club América. Pérez signed with Atlanta on 4 March 2011.

Pérez then signed for Mexican side Estudiantes Tecos by 10 June 2011.

=== International ===
Pérez has represented various Mexico national teams, including: 1999 U17 World Cup squad, 2004 Olympic squad, as well as the senior side.

== Honours ==
Mexico U23

- CONCACAF Olympic Qualifying Championship: 2004
