= Atlanta Silverbacks U23s =

- Full name: Atlanta Silverbacks U23s
- Nickname: U23s
- Founded: 2006
- Ground: RE/MAX Greater Atlanta Stadium
- Capacity: 4,000
- Chairman: (United States) Stephen Pratten
- Manager: (United States) Steve Muccillo
- League: USL Premier Development League
- 2008: 4th, Southeast Division
Home colors	Away colors

Atlanta Silverbacks U23s was an American soccer team based in Atlanta, Georgia, United States. Founded in 2006, the team played in the USL Premier Development League (PDL), the fourth tier of the American Soccer Pyramid, until 2008, when the franchise folded and the team left the league.

The team played its home games at the soccer-specific RE/MAX Greater Atlanta Stadium in nearby Chamblee, Georgia. The team's colors were red, black and white.

== History ==
The Atlanta Silverbacks U23s entered the PDL in 2006 as the new development arm of the Atlanta Silverbacks USL First Division franchise. With the backing and support of their parent organization, the first year was pretty successful for the club. The team were unbeaten in their first five games, the highlight of which was an impressive 3–0 victory over Ajax Orlando Prospects that featured a brace by striker Damone Priestley. The highlights in June included a free-scoring see-sawing game against Raleigh CASL Elite which the Silverbacks emerged from as 4–3 winners, and an impressive 6–0 demolition West Virginia Chaos that featured a hat trick from defender John Drummond. The Silverbacks form faded in the latter half of the season, where they managed two wins in their final seven games. A 2–2 tie away at Nashville Metros on the final day of the season eventually left the Silverbacks 3rd in the South Atlantic Division, just out of the playoffs. Midfielder Jyler Noviello was the top scorer, registering 7 goals on the season, while John Drummond tallied 6 assists to go with his own 5 goals.

2007 was much of the same for the Silverbacks, who continued to tally a number of impressive results. The team lost just two games all season – 4–0 to Cary RailHawks U23s in June and 2–1 away to the Palm Beach Pumas in July – and were models of consistency for much of the year. In fact, the season ended with the Silverbacks on a 5-game winning streak which included a massive 8–0 hammering of Cocoa Expos and a 2–0 final day victory against divisional champions Carolina Dynamo; however, the gods were not smiling on the men from Atlanta as Central Florida Kraze's 3–0 victory over Palm Beach in their final regular season game left the Silverbacks third in the division for a second year in a row, pipped at the post to the playoff spot on goal difference. Striker Ryan Roushandel notched an impressive 8 goals on the season, while both David Bell and Patrick Murray registered 4 assists each.

The Silverbacks entered the 2008 season with plans to emulate their big brothers, who had finished as runners-up in the 2007 USL1 playoffs; they started strongly, opening with an exciting 3–3 tie at home against Cary RailHawks U23s, and winning four of their next five games of the season, including an impressive 4–0 drubbing of the hapless Palm Beach Pumas. They began June with a whopping 7–1 demolition of Nashville Metros in which Chad Burt scored a hat trick, but thereafter the Silverbacks suffered a dip in form. They lost three games on the trot in late June, conceding a late goal to lose 2–1 at Carolina Dynamo, and letting Bradenton Academics score on them five times, and suddenly their playoff spot was in jeopardy. Despite winning three of their final games of the regular season, all of which were high scoring thrillers, and included a last-minute winner in the 3–2 victory over Nashville, and a 4–2 final day blowout over Carolina Dynamo in which Ryan Roushandel scored a hat trick, they were never quite able to make up the deficit brought on by their mid season slump, eventually finishing a close 4th in the Southeast Division, 6 point out of the playoffs. Ryan Roushandel scored 12 goals for the season, while Jeff Scannella contributed 9 assists.

Following the conclusion of the 2008 season, the team's parent organization, the senior Atlanta Silverbacks, announced they would be withdrawing from the 2009 USL First Division campaign in order to "assess the landscape". As such, the Silverbacks U23s also withdrew from the PDL.

== Year-by-year ==
Year	Division	League	Regular season	Playoffs	Open Cup
2006	4	USL PDL	3rd, South Atlantic	Did not qualify	Did not qualify
2007	4	USL PDL	3rd, Southeast	Did not qualify	Did not qualify
2008	4	USL PDL	4th, Southeast	Did not qualify	Did not qualify

== Head coaches ==
- (United States) Steve Muccillo (2006–2008)

== Stadia ==
- RE/MAX Greater Atlanta Stadium (Silverbacks Park); Chamblee, Georgia (2006–2008)

== Average attendance ==
Year	Attendance	Notes
2006	149	
2007	156	
2008	—	
All Time	153	
