= Lucas Paulini =

Argentine footballer

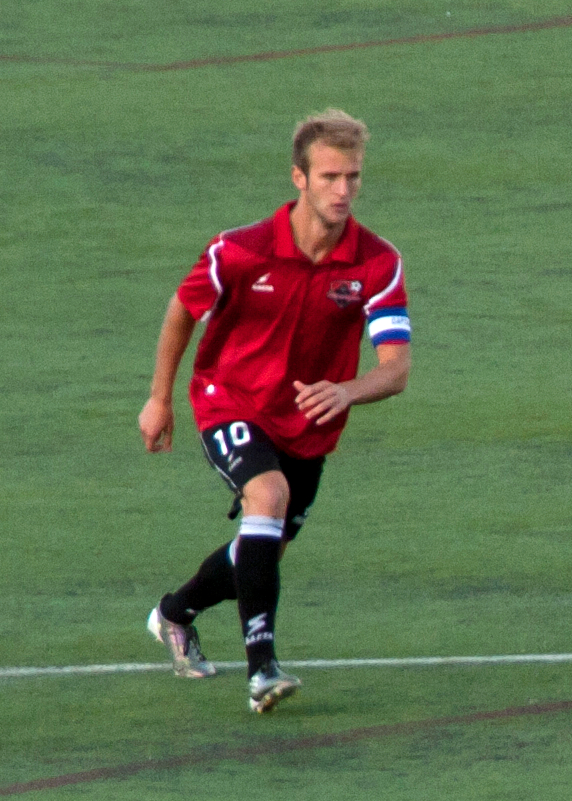

Personal information
- Full name: Lucas Paulini
- Date of birth: March 19, 1989 (age 37)
- Place of birth: Buenos Aires, Argentina
- Height: 6 ft 1 in (1.85 m)
- Positions: Midfielder; forward

Youth career
- 2007–2009: Tusculum Pioneers
- 2010: VCU Rams

Senior career*
Years	Team	Apps	(Gls)
2009–2010	Mississippi Brilla	29	(4)
2011–2014	Atlanta Silverbacks	55	(2)
2016	Richmond Kickers	2	(0)

Managerial career
- 2019–: VCU Rams (assistant)
- * Club domestic league appearances and goals as of 3 April 2016

Lucas Paulini (born March 19, 1989, in Buenos Aires) is an Argentine former footballer and assistant manager who currently serves an assistant manager for Virginia Commonwealth University.

== Career ==
=== College and amateur ===
Paulini moved from his native Argentina to the United States in 2007 when he was offered a college soccer scholarship to Tusculum College. He scored seven goals and picked up 10 assists in his freshman year at Tusculum, on his way to being named the South Atlantic Conference Freshman of the Year, and to the All-South Atlantic Conference First Team. He was named to the All-South Atlantic Conference first team and the All-Region Division II second team as a sophomore in 2008, before transferring to Virginia Commonwealth University prior to his senior year.

During his college years he played in the USL Premier Development League for the Mississippi Brilla.

=== Professional ===
Paulini turned professional in 2011 when he signed with Atlanta Silverbacks of the North American Soccer League. He made his professional debut on April 9, 2011, in a game against the NSC Minnesota Stars Atlanta announced on November 8, 2011, that Paulini would return for the 2012 season.
