= Nico Colaluca =

American soccer player

Personal information
- Full name: Nicolas Colaluca
- Date of birth: May 23, 1986 (age 40)
- Place of birth: Providence, Rhode Island, United States
- Height: 1.75 m (5 ft 9 in)
- Position: Midfielder

Youth career
- 2004–2006: Virginia Cavaliers

Senior career*
Years	Team	Apps	(Gls)
2004–2005	Rhode Island Stingrays	6	(3)
2007–2009	Colorado Rapids	4	(0)
2009–2010	New England Revolution	7	(0)
2009	→ Western Mass Pioneers (loan)	3	(0)
2011	Norrby IF	5	(1)
2011–2012	Atlanta Silverbacks	23	(2)

International career^{‡}
2004	United States U20	8	(0)
- * Club domestic league appearances and goals as of September 26, 2012 ‡ National team caps and goals as of August 10, 2012

Nicolas "Nico" Colaluca (born May 23, 1986) is an American former professional soccer player who played as a midfielder.

== Career ==
=== Youth and college ===
Born in Providence, Rhode Island, he attended La Salle Academy in Providence. Colaluca played college soccer at the University of Virginia, and in the USL Premier Development League with the Rhode Island Stingrays. In 2004, he was awarded NSCAA High School Player of The Year and also participated in the High School McDonald's All-American game that year. While at Virginia, he was named to the 2004 Freshman All-American Team, the 2004 ACC All-Tournament Team, and the 2004 ACC All-Freshman Team.

=== Professional ===
Colaluca was drafted in the first round (6th overall) of the 2007 MLS SuperDraft by the Colorado Rapids, and subsequently made 4 MLS appearances during his two seasons with the team. He was traded to New England Revolution in exchange for Rob Valentino on May 6, 2009.

During 2009 Colaluca also spent time on loan with Western Mass Pioneers in the USL Second Division.

It was announced on November 18, 2010, that Colaluca would graduate from the MLS Generation Adidas program at the end of the 2010 season.

On August 3, 2011, he signed with the Atlanta Silverbacks of the NASL.

=== International ===
Colaluca played with the youth teams of the United States, including the under-20 level.
