= Ciaran O'Brien =

American soccer player and coach

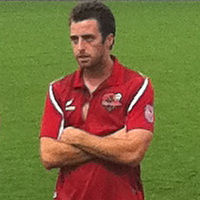
- O'Brien giving a post-game interview

Personal information
- Full name: Ciaran Patrick O'Brien
- Date of birth: November 17, 1987 (age 38)
- Place of birth: Federal Way, Washington, United States
- Height: 5 ft 9 in (1.75 m)
- Position: Midfielder

Youth career
- 2002–2005: Decatur High School

College career
Years	Team	Apps	(Gls)
2006	San Diego Toreros		
2007	UC Santa Barbara Gauchos		

Senior career*
Years	Team	Apps	(Gls)
2007	Tacoma Tide	15	(7)
2008–2010	Colorado Rapids	1	(0)
2008	→ Seattle Sounders (loan)	5	(0)
2009	→ Austin Aztex FC (loan)	3	(0)
2009	→ Montreal Impact (loan)	13	(1)
2011–2012	Atlanta Silverbacks	47	(6)
2013	Carolina RailHawks	7	(0)
2013	San Antonio Scorpions	4	(0)
Total		95	(14)

Managerial career
- 2015: UC Santa Barbara Gauchos (assistant)
- * Club domestic league appearances and goals

Ciaran Patrick O'Brien (born November 17, 1987) is an American former soccer coach and player.

== Early life and education ==
O'Brien played center midfield for four years at Decatur High School in Federal Way, Washington, where he earned NSCAA All-American honors, was a First Team All-South Puget Sound League selection for four straight years, and was selected as the Washington State Gatorade Player of the Year after his senior season.

O'Brien initially played college soccer for the University of San Diego, where he was an NSCAA Freshman All-American and was named to the All-WCC Second Team, before transferring to UC Santa Barbara in his sophomore year. With the UCSB Gauchos, he made the 2007 NCAA Tournament, losing out to national finalists Ohio State. He was named the 2007 Big West Midfielder of the Year with UCSB and was the highest-scoring player in the Big West with 25 points on seven goals and 11 assists. During his college years, O'Brien also played for Tacoma Tide of the USL Premier Development League, where his father was head coach.

== Playing career ==
O'Brien left UC Santa Barbara early and signed a Generation Adidas contract. He was the 5th overall pick in the 2008 MLS SuperDraft, selected by the Colorado Rapids. He made his Major League Soccer debut as a substitute in the 71st minute in Colorado's first match of the 2008 season against Los Angeles Galaxy on March 29, 2008, but was sent off in the 90th minute for a tackle on Carlos Ruiz. The tackle tore the meniscus in Ruiz's right knee leaving him out for an extended period. It was the only MLS game of O'Brien's career.

O'Brien was sent on loan to USL First Division side, Seattle Sounders, in August 2008 to gain first team experience. With the Sounders, O'Brien appeared in 5 league games (309 minutes total) tallying 2 assists. He also appeared in a Lamar Hunt U.S. Open Cup game. However, O'Brien was soon recalled and was back with Colorado at the end of August.

In June 2009, O'Brien made a season-long loan to USL-1 side Austin Aztex. In July 2009, he was signed on loan from Colorado Rapids by Impact de Montréal until the end of the 2009 USL season.

During summer 2010, O'Brien trialed with League of Ireland Premier Division side Sporting Fingal but a loan deal with Colorado could not be agreed.

O'Brien graduated from the MLS Generation Adidas program on November 18, 2010. O'Brien became a MLS free agent when Colorado declined his 2011 contract option and he was not selected in the 2010 MLS Re-Entry Draft.

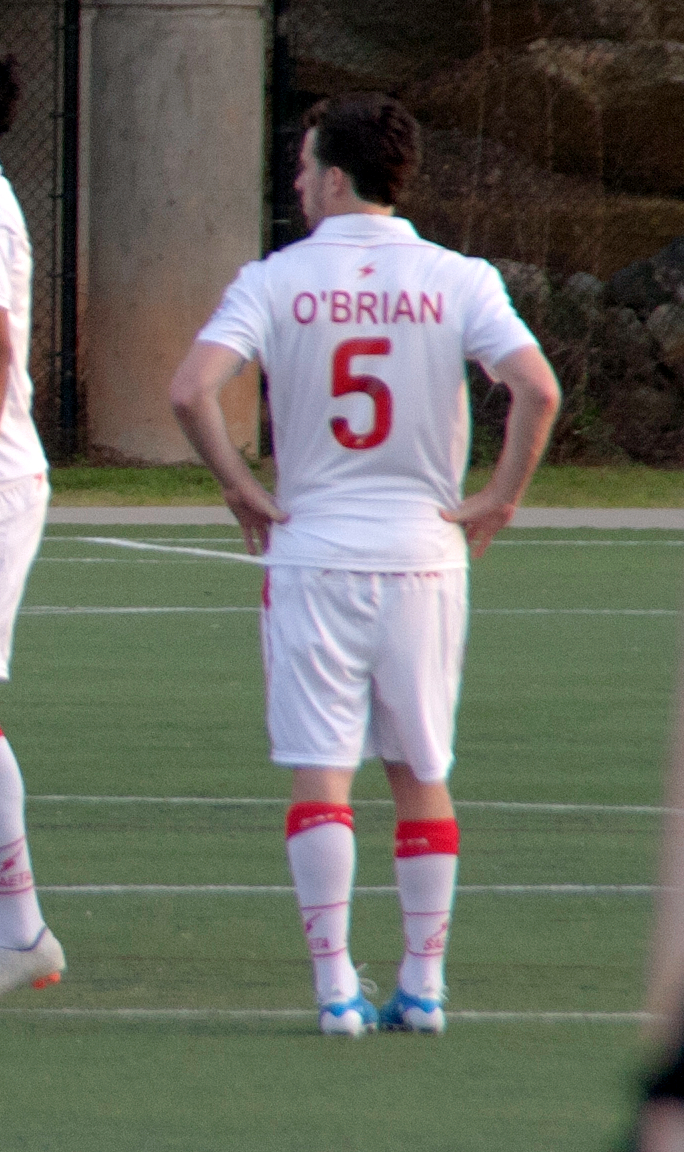
Ciaran O'Brien - 2011-04-09 - Atlanta Silverbacks

O'Brien signed with North American Soccer League club Atlanta Silverbacks on March 21, 2011. O'Brien won his first league honors on July 11, 2011, winning the NASL Offensive Player of the Week. Atlanta announced on November 8, 2011, that O'Brien would return for the 2012 season.

On February 21, 2013, it was announced that O'Brien had signed with Carolina RailHawks for the 2013 season.

== Coaching career ==
O'Brien was named as an assistant coach of the UC Santa Barbara Gauchos men's soccer team in August 2015.

== Personal life ==
O'Brien is the son of former Republic of Ireland international player Fran O'Brien, and the brother of fellow professional soccer player Leighton O'Brien.
