= Atlanta Silverbacks FC =

- Full name: Atlanta Silverbacks Football Club
- Nickname: Silverbacks
- Founded: 1994; 32 years ago (as Atlanta Ruckus)
- Dissolved: 2015; 11 years ago
- Stadium: Atlanta Silverbacks Park; Atlanta
- Capacity: 5,000
- League: A-League (1994–2004); USL First Division (2005–2008); North American Soccer League (2011–2015)
Home colors	Away colors

The Atlanta Silverbacks FC were an American professional soccer club based in Atlanta, Georgia. Founded in 1994 as Atlanta Ruckus, the club played in many leagues over the years before folding after the 2015 season. The team played its home games at Atlanta Silverbacks Park, a large soccer complex featuring a 5,000-seat soccer-specific stadium in Atlanta, 15 miles northeast of downtown. The team's colors were red, black, grey, and white.

The club had 2 independent supporter groups, Westside 109 and the Atlanta Ultras. The Ultras were established in 2011 & were known to support both the Silverbacks men's and women's side. The Ultras were also to be known for their fanatical support at Silverbacks Park, as well as away matches. They had a reputation for their unfriendly or challenging attitude towards fans from opposing clubs.

The team had a Women's Premier Soccer League counterpart in the Atlanta Silverbacks Women from 2005 through 2016.

== History ==
=== Atlanta Ruckus (1994–1998) ===
In July 1994, the American Professional Soccer League announced it had accepted the Atlanta Magic, owned by Sam Chase, as a new franchise for the 1995 season. At the time, the Magic played in the USISL. In October 1994, the team, still referred to as the Atlanta Magic, signed national team forward Bruce Murray. However, by November 1994, Chase had decided to enter an entirely new team, to be named the Atlanta Ruckus, in the APSL. Despite this decision, several Magic players moved to the Ruckus, including Bill Andracki, Chris Hellenkamp, Brian Moore and Mo Suri. Even after the creation of the Ruckus, the Atlanta Magic continued to play in the USISL, losing to the Baltimore Bays in the 1995–96 USISL indoor season championship.

The Ruckus nearly failed even before it had played a game. Six weeks before the 1995 season, Chase experienced financial difficulties and failed to post the required $100,000 letter of credit with the league by the March 1 deadline. The league nearly revoked the franchise, but, South African businessman Johnny Imerman quickly stepped in and bought the team. The Ruckus, under former U.S. national team coach Lothar Osiander, began its competitive existence on May 5, 1995, when it defeated the Vancouver Whitecaps in the first game of the newly renamed A-League. The Ruckus experienced a mid-season loss of form, but the addition of several new players, including Justin Fashanu, led to a resurgence. Atlanta made it to the championship series, only to lose to the Seattle Sounders in three games. After losing nearly $600,000 in 1995 and continuing to lose money in 1996, Imerman arranged for the league to take over team operations in June 1996. In August 1996, Vincent Lu purchased the franchise. In June 1998, the league suspended the team after Lu refused to sign a renewed franchise agreement with the league. The A-League continued to operate the team, now known as the A-League Atlanta. At the time Umbro had a promotional contract with the A-League and it contacted a local Atlanta law firm, Alston & Bird, about the possibility of litigation against the league and Lu. However, this contact resulted in Alston & Bird lawyer John Latham purchasing the team along with his friend Bobby Glustrom. In September 1998, Latham and Glustrom hired Mike Balson as general manager. Balson then hired 1996 USISL Coach of the Year Nuno Piteira as head coach.

=== Atlanta Silverbacks FC (1998–2015) ===
In a September 1998 press conference at Zoo Atlanta, the two partners also announced the team would be known as the Atlanta Silverbacks in honor of Willie B., a silverback gorilla who was a star attraction at the zoo. The team also moved to DeKalb Memorial Stadium for the 1999 season. From at least 1999 to at least 2001, the Silverbacks were affiliated with the Dallas Burn of Major League Soccer. In January 2000, David Cormack joined Latham and Glustrom as owners of the Silverbacks, but left in September to become the Chief Executive of Aberdeen F.C. In 2000, Atlanta and Tennessee Rhythm began an annual competition for the Willie B. Cup. Between 2000 and 2007, when the cup was discontinued, the Silverbacks won it four times. Despite the new ownership group, coach and stadium, the Silverbacks continued to struggle on the field. From 1996 through 2001, the team went through seven coaches and missed the playoffs six consecutive seasons. In 2002, the Silverbacks, under head coach Brett Mosen, made the playoffs and went to the third round of the Lamar Hunt U.S. Open Cup. In 2003, Atlanta began another string of poor seasons, failing to make the playoffs for four seasons. Finally in 2007, for the first time since its inaugural season in 1995, Atlanta made it to the league championship, falling to the Seattle Sounders.

In November 2009, the Silverbacks announced their intent to leave the USL First Division to become the co-founders of a new North American Soccer League, which would begin play in 2010. The league, which at the time had yet to be sanctioned by the United States Soccer Federation or the Canadian Soccer Association, would also comprise the Carolina RailHawks, Crystal Palace Baltimore, Miami FC, Minnesota Thunder, Montreal Impact, FC Tampa Bay, Vancouver Whitecaps and a brand new team led by St. Louis Soccer United. However, the NASL was not sanctioned by the United States Soccer Federation and the Silverbacks did not play during the 2010 season. On November 20, 2010, the USSF sanctioned the NASL and the Atlanta Silverbacks immediately re-joined for the 2011 season.

On May 22, 2012, the Atlanta Silverbacks created controversy when they became the first team to sell the rights to host a 2012 U.S. Open Cup match to Seattle Sounders FC.

On July 2, 2012, the Silverbacks announced former United States men's national soccer team star Eric Wynalda would take over as the club's interim head coach and Director of Soccer, replacing Alex Pineda Chacón and Rodrigo Rios respectively. Wynalda appointed Brian Haynes as the team's permanent head coach, while Wynalda remained on the Silverbacks' staff as technical director. Under the leadership of Haynes and Wynalda, the team enjoyed a remarkable turnaround and captured the 2013 NASL Spring season title, thus earning the right to host the 2013 Soccer Bowl, which the Silverbacks lost 1–0 to the New York Cosmos. Haynes posted a regular season record of 13 wins, 10 losses, and 10 draws and won the 2013 NASL Coach of the Year trophy, but team leadership ultimately decided not to retain him as head coach, citing poor results during the 2013 fall season.

At the 2014 Lamar Hunt U.S. Open Cup, the Silverbacks defeated MLS teams Real Salt Lake and Colorado Rapids to reach quarterfinals, where they lost to Chicago Fire.

On December 2, 2014, the NASL licensed the Silverbacks name from Boris Jerkunica and Henry Hardin and continued to operate the team through the 2015 season. The league was not successful in finding new ownership, and the club ceased operations on January 11, 2016.

=== Legacy ===
The Silverbacks' reserve side in the amateur National Premier Soccer League adopted the Silverbacks name after the NASL club folded. Jerkunica maintained ownership of the name, and was part of the NPSL ownership group. In January 2019, the club announced that it had parted ways with Jerkunica, and consequently lost the right to use the Silverbacks name, choosing to be known as Atlanta SC.

== Colors and badge ==
The Silverbacks official colors were red, black, silver, and white, and the club logo featured those four colors prominently. On January 23, 2013, a new logo was announced. The club's name was inspired by Willie B., a gorilla who was a main attraction of Zoo Atlanta until his death in February 2000.

In September 2012, a poll was posted on the Silverbacks' official website relating to a potential rebrand. The options were: to retain the Silverbacks name, a rebrand to Atlanta Chiefs to recall the team from the original NASL or a third write-in option. The name Atlanta FC was later added to the poll after receiving a "significant" number of the write-in votes.

== Stadium ==
- DeKalb Memorial Stadium; Clarkston, Georgia (2003–2005)
- Atlanta Silverbacks Park; Atlanta (2006–2015)

The Silverbacks played their home games at Atlanta Silverbacks Park, a 5,000-seat soccer-specific stadium built in 2006 for use specifically by the team. Prior to the 2006 season the Silverbacks played at various municipal stadiums in the Greater Atlanta area, most notably DeKalb Memorial Stadium in Clarkston.

== Notable former players ==
This list of former players includes those who received international caps while playing for the team, made significant contributions to the team in terms of appearances or goals while playing for the team, or who made significant contributions to the sport either before they played for the team, or after they left.

- (United States) Danny Barrera
- (United States) Pablo Cruz
- (United States) Mark Bloom
- (El Salvador) Junior Burgos
- (United States) Jeff Cassar
- (Honduras) Alex Pineda Chacón
- (United States) Nico Colaluca
- (Jamaica) Fabian Dawkins
- (Mexico) Antonio de la Torre
- (United States) John Doyle
- (England) Justin Fashanu
- (Trinidad and Tobago) Leslie "Tiger" Fitzpatrick
- (Trinidad and Tobago) Anthony Wolfe
- (Republic of Ireland) Liam George
- (United States) David Hayes
- (Senegal) Macoumba Kandji
- (United States) Tim Martin
- (United States) Tony McManus
- (Scotland) Shaun McSkimming
- (Democratic Republic of the Congo) Ignace Moleka
- (United States) Edgar Espinoza
- (United States) Bruce Murray
- (Chile) Reinaldo Navia
- (Brazil) Felipe Nogueira
- (Bermuda) John Barry Nusum
- (United States) Ciaran O'Brien
- (United States) Bo Oshoniyi
- (Mexico) Mario Pérez Zúñiga
- (United States) Brian Piesner
- (Mexico) Felipe Quintero
- (Chile) Rodrigo Ríos
- (Trinidad and Tobago) Brent Sancho
- (Norway) Staale Soebye
- (South Africa) Lenin Steenkamp
- (Honduras) Danilo Turcios
- (Bulgaria) Velko Yotov
- (El Salvador) Richard Menjivar
- (Belize) Deon McCaulay
- (United States) Daryl Sattler
- (Libya) Fahmi El-Shami
- (United States) Joshua Barton (2003,2004)
- (United States) Joseph Barton (2004,2005)

== Head coaches ==
- (Germany) Lothar Osiander (1995)
- (United States) Charlie Morgan (1996)
- (United States) Angus McAlpine (1997)
- (United States) David Eristavi (1997–1998)
- (United States) Chris Hellenkamp (1998) (Interim)
- (United States) Nuno Piteira (1999–2000)
- (United States) John Dugan (2001)
- (England) Brett Mosen (2002)
- (Brazil) Jacenir Silva (2003)
- (United States) David Vaudreuil (2004–2005)
- (United States) Jason Smith (2005–2008)
- (Mexico) José Manuel Abundis (2011)
- (Honduras) Alex Pineda Chacón (2012)
- (United States) Eric Wynalda (2012) (Interim)
- (Trinidad and Tobago) Brian Haynes (2012–2013)
- (United States) Eric Wynalda (2014) (Note: Wynalda managed the team with the title "Technical Director")
- (United States) Jason Smith (2014)
- (Uruguay) Alejandro Pombo (2014) (Interim)
- (England) Gary Smith (2014–2015)

== Achievements ==
- North American Soccer League
  - Champion (Season) (1): 2013 Spring
- A-League
  - Runner-up (Playoffs) (1): 1995
- USL First Division
  - Runner-up (Playoffs) (1): 2007
- Minor Trophies
  - Southern Derby (4): 2002, 2004, 2005*, 2006

*-as co-champion

== Record ==
=== Year-by-year ===
Year	Division	League	Reg. season (W-L-D)	Playoffs	Open Cup	Avg. attendance
Atlanta Ruckus
1995	2	A-League	4th (13–11)	Finalist	2nd Round	2,632
1996	2	A-League	7th (3–19)	did not qualify	did not qualify	4,315
1997	2	USISL A-League	7th, Central (12–16)	did not qualify	did not qualify	2,406
1998	2	USISL A-League	6th, Atlantic (7–21)	did not qualify	did not qualify	923
Atlanta Silverbacks
1999	2	USL A-League	5th, Atlantic (15–13)	did not qualify	did not qualify	2,703
2000	2	USL A-League	6th, Atlantic (11–14–3)	did not qualify	did not qualify	3,327
2001	2	USL A-League	5th, Central (13–12–1)	1st Round	did not qualify	1,094
2002	2	USL A-League	3rd, Southeast (13–13–2)	1st Round	3rd Round	1,006
2003	2	USL A-League	5th, Southeast (4–17–7)	did not qualify	3rd Round	1,200
2004	2	USL A-League	5th, Eastern (14–11–3)	did not qualify	4th Round	1,662
2005	2	USL First Division	8th (10–15–3)	did not qualify	3rd Round	1,724
2006	2	USL First Division	8th (10–13–5)	did not qualify	3rd Round	2,298
2007	2	USL First Division	4th (12–9–7)	Finalist	3rd Round	2,372
2008	2	USL First Division	9th (8–12–10)	did not qualify	2nd Round	2,281
2009	On Hiatus					
2010	On Hiatus					
2011	2	NASL	8th (4–20–4)	did not qualify	Denied entry	2,866
2012	2	NASL	7th (7–12–9)	did not qualify	3rd Round	4,505
2013	2	NASL	1st – Spring (6–3–3) 7th – Fall (4–6–4)	Runners-up	3rd Round	4,677
2014	2	NASL	8th – Spring (3–5–1) 10th – Fall (3–11–4)	did not qualify	Quarterfinals	4,053
2015	2	NASL	11th – Spring (1–4–5) 6th – Fall (6–7–7)	did not qualify	4th Round	4,024

Preceded by Charlotte Eagles	Southern Derby Winner; 2002	Succeeded by Charleston Battery
Preceded by Charleston Battery	Southern Derby Winner; 2004	Succeeded by Co-Winners with Charleston Battery
Preceded by Atlanta Silverbacks	Southern Derby Co-Winners; 2005; With: Charleston Battery	Succeeded by Atlanta Silverbacks
Preceded by Atlanta Silverbacks	Southern Derby Winner; 2006	Succeeded by Carolina RailHawks FC
