= 2004–05 Colchester United F.C. season =

Colchester United
2004–05 season
- Chairman: Peter Heard
- Manager: Phil Parkinson
- Stadium: Layer Road
- League One: 15th
- FA Cup: 4th round (eliminated by Blackburn Rovers)
- League Cup: 3rd round (eliminated by Southampton)
- Football League Trophy: 1st round (southern section) (eliminated by Southend United)
- Top goalscorer: League: Neil Danns (11); All: Craig Fagan (14)
- Highest home attendance: 4,834 v Torquay United, 7 May 2005
- Lowest home attendance: 2,144 v Cheltenham Town, 24 August 2004
- Average home league attendance: 3,481
- Biggest win: 5–0 v Walsall, 25 January 2005
- Biggest defeat: 0–3 v Blackburn Rovers, 29 January 2005
Home colours

The 2004–05 season was Colchester United's 63rd season in their history and their seventh successive season in the third tier of English football, the newly renamed League One. Alongside competing in League One, the club also participated in the FA Cup, the League Cup and the Football League Trophy.

After reaching the area final of the Football League Trophy, Colchester were eliminated by the team that they played in the final, Southend United, in the first round of the competition. However, they fared better in the League Cup, defeating Premier League West Bromwich Albion in the second round but were defeated by Southampton in the third. They also reached the fourth round of the FA Cup, where the U's further Premier League opposition in Blackburn Rovers but were beaten 3–0.

In the league, Colchester had a poor mid-season run, eventually ending the season 15th in the League One table.

== Season overview ==
Phil Parkinson rung the changes for the new season, with numerous new signings and multiple outgoings. After a strong start to the season, topping the table after three games, a bad spell of mid-season form saw Colchester drop down the League One rankings. Just four wins in 25 games was the catalyst to a 15th-placed finish, while fans were left frustrated at Parkinson's 4-5-1 formation at home. One positive was that no team managed to score more than two goals against the U's in the league.

On 21 September 2004, West Bromwich Albion became the last top-flight club to visit Layer Road for their League Cup fixture. Colchester won 2–1, earning a trip to another Premier League side in Southampton. They pushed their hosts close, but were eventually defeated 3–2.

In the FA Cup, Colchester needed a replay to beat Mansfield Town, while also winning on their travels at Rushden & Diamonds and Hull City. In the fourth round, they were drawn against Premier League Blackburn Rovers where they lost 3–0.

== Players ==
As of match played 7 May 2005.

No.	Name	Position	Nationality	Place of birth	Date of birth	Apps	Goals	Signed from	Date signed	Fee
Goalkeepers
1	Aidan Davison	GK	(Northern Ireland)	(England) Sedgefield	11 May 1968 (aged 36)	0	0	(England) Grimsby Town	5 July 2004	Free transfer
13	Dean Gerken	GK	(England)	Southend-on-Sea	22 May 1985 (aged 19)	1	0	Youth team	1 August 2002	Free transfer
35	Mark Cousins	GK	(England)	Chelmsford	9 January 1987 (aged 17)	0	0	Youth team	1 August 2004	Free transfer
Defenders
2	Greg Halford	FB/MF	(England)	Chelmsford	8 December 1984 (aged 19)	25	4	Youth team	1 August 2002	Free transfer
3	Joe Keith	FB	(England)	Plaistow	1 October 1978 (aged 25)	206	24	(England) West Ham United	24 May 1999	Free transfer
5	Wayne Brown	CB	(England)	Barking	20 August 1977 (aged 26)	19	0	(England) Watford	8 July 2004	Free transfer
12	Pat Baldwin	CB	(England)	City of London	12 November 1982 (aged 21)	29	0	(England) Chelsea	16 August 2002	Free transfer
14	Stephen Hunt	FB	(England)	Southampton	11 November 1984 (aged 19)	0	0	(England) Southampton	5 July 2004	Free transfer
16	George Elokobi	FB/CB	(Cameroon)	Mamfe	31 January 1986 (aged 18)	0	0	(England) Dulwich Hamlet	1 August 2004	Free transfer
18	Liam Chilvers	CB	(England)	Chelmsford	6 November 1981 (aged 22)	51	0	(England) Arsenal	10 June 2004	Free transfer
19	Garry Richards	CB	(England)	Romford	11 June 1986 (aged 17)	0	0	Youth team	1 July 2004	Free transfer
23	John White	FB	(England)	Colchester	26 July 1986 (aged 17)	0	0	Youth team	1 July 2003	Free transfer
25	Sam Stockley	FB	(England)	Tiverton	5 September 1977 (aged 26)	93	1	(England) Oxford United	31 October 2002	Free transfer
Midfielders
4	Gavin Johnson	MF	(England)	Eye	10 October 1970 (aged 33)	123	4	(Scotland) Dunfermline Athletic	14 November 1999	Free transfer
6	Kevin Watson	MF	(England)	Hackney	3 January 1974 (aged 30)	0	0	(England) Reading	5 July 2004	Free transfer
7	Karl Duguid	MF	(England)	Letchworth	21 March 1978 (aged 26)	308	39	Youth team	9 December 1995 (Note: Date of signing refers to the date of the player's first game for the club)	Free transfer
10	Kemal Izzet	MF	(England)	Whitechapel	29 September 1980 (aged 23)	155	18	(England) Charlton Athletic	13 April 2001	Free transfer
15	Ben Bowditch	MF	(England)	Harlow	19 February 1984 (aged 20)	0	0	(Denmark) AB	10 August 2004	Free transfer
17	Bobby Bowry	MF	(Saint Kitts and Nevis)	(England) Hampstead	19 May 1971 (aged 33)	109	2	(England) Millwall	25 July 2001	Free transfer
21	Robbie King	MF	(England)	Chelmsford	1 October 1986 (aged 17)	0	0	Youth team	1 July 2004	Free transfer
27	Craig Johnston	MF	(England)		4 December 1985 (aged 18)	0	0	Youth team	1 July 2002	Free transfer
26	Neil Danns	MF	(Guyana)	(England) Liverpool	23 November 1982 (aged 21)	13	4	(England) Blackburn Rovers	23 December 2004	Nominal
28	Richard Garcia	MF	(Australia)	Perth	4 September 1981 (aged 22)	0	0	(England) West Ham United	3 September 2004	Nominal
	Liam Coleman	MF/FW	(England)	Colchester	11 January 1986 (aged 18)	0	0	Youth team	1 July 2003	Free transfer
Forwards
8	Gareth Williams	FW	(Wales)	Cardiff	10 September 1982 (aged 21)	15	8	(England) Crystal Palace	31 August 2004	Part-exchange
9	Marino Keith	FW	(Scotland)	Peterhead	16 December 1974 (aged 29)	0	0	(England) Plymouth Argyle	1 March 2005	Free transfer
11	Jamie Cade	FW	(England)	Durham	15 January 1985 (aged 19)	15	0	(England) Middlesbrough	25 November 2003	Free transfer
29	Jamie Guy	FW	(England)	Barking	1 August 1987 (aged 16)	0	0	Youth team	1 July 2004	Free transfer
	Tristan Toney	FW	(England)		4 February 1984 (aged 20)	0	0	Youth team	1 July 2002	Free transfer

== Transfers ==
=== In ===
Date	Position	Nationality	Name	From	Fee	Ref.
10 June 2004	CB	(England)	Liam Chilvers	(England) Arsenal	Free transfer	
1 July 2004	FW	(England)	Jamie Guy	Youth team	Free transfer	
1 July 2004	MF	(England)	Robbie King	Youth team	Free transfer	
1 July 2004	CB	(England)	Garry Richards	Youth team	Free transfer	
5 July 2004	GK	(Northern Ireland)	Aidan Davison	(England) Grimsby Town	Free transfer	
5 July 2004	FB	(England)	Stephen Hunt	(England) Southampton	Free transfer	
5 July 2004	MF	(England)	Kevin Watson	(England) Reading	Free transfer	
8 July 2004	CB	(England)	Wayne Brown	(England) Watford	Free transfer	
1 August 2004	GK	(England)	Mark Cousins	Youth team	Free transfer	
1 August 2004	FB/CB	(Cameroon)	George Elokobi	(England) Dulwich Hamlet	Free transfer	
10 August 2004	MF	(England)	Ben Bowditch	(Denmark) AB	Free transfer	
31 August 2004	FW	(Wales)	Gareth Williams	(England) Crystal Palace	Part-exchange with Wayne Andrews	
3 September 2004	MF	(Australia)	Richard Garcia	(England) West Ham United	Nominal	
19 October 2004	GK	(Wales)	Andy Marriott	(England) Coventry City	Free transfer	
23 December 2004	MF	(Guyana)	Neil Danns	(England) Blackburn Rovers	Nominal	
21 January 2005	FW	(Democratic Republic of the Congo)	Guylain Ndumbu-Nsungu	(England) Sheffield Wednesday	Free transfer	
1 March 2005	FW	(Scotland)	Marino Keith	(England) Plymouth Argyle	Free transfer	

- Total spending: ▼ ~ £0

=== Out ===
Date	Position	Nationality	Name	To	Fee	Ref.
2 June 2004	CB	(England)	Alan White	(England) Leyton Orient	Free transfer	
11 June 2004	CB	(Republic of Ireland)	Scott Fitzgerald	(England) Brentford	Released	
24 June 2004	GK	(England)	Simon Brown	(Scotland) Hibernian	Free transfer	
30 June 2004	FW	(England)	Scott McGleish	(England) Northampton Town	Free transfer	
30 June 2004	GK	(Northern Ireland)	Richard McKinney	(England) Walsall	Released	
30 June 2004	CB/FB	(England)	Andy Myers	(England) Brentford	Released	
24 July 2004	MF	(France)	Thomas Pinault	(England) Grimsby Town	Released	
31 August 2004	FW	(England)	Wayne Andrews	(England) Crystal Palace	Part-exchange with Gareth Williams plus £100,000	
4 November 2004	GK	(Wales)	Andy Marriott	(England) Bury	Free transfer	
28 February 2005	FW	(England)	Craig Fagan	(England) Hull City	Undisclosed	
31 March 2005	CB	(England)	Ross Crouch	(England) Halstead Town	Undisclosed	
31 March 2005	FW	(Democratic Republic of the Congo)	Guylain Ndumbu-Nsungu	(England) Darlington	Free transfer	

- Total incoming: ▲ ~ £100,000

=== Loans in ===
Date	Position	Nationality	Name	From	End date	Ref.
3 August 2004	FW	(England)	Ben May	(England) Millwall	20 October 2004	
10 September 2004	MF	(Guyana)	Neil Danns	(England) Blackburn Rovers	10 November 2004	
17 March 2005	WG	(England)	Marc Goodfellow	(England) Bristol City	8 May 2005	
24 March 2005	FW	(England)	Ryan Jarvis	(England) Norwich City	8 May 2005	

=== Loans out ===
Date	Position	Nationality	Name	To	End date	Ref.
24 September 2004	CB	(England)	Ross Crouch	(England) Wivenhoe Town	24 October 2004	
29 September 2004	FW	(England)	Jamie Guy	(England) Tiptree United	29 October 2004	
29 September 2004	FW	(England)	Tristan Toney	(England) Tiptree United	29 October 2004	
14 January 2005	CB	(England)	Ross Crouch	(England) Redbridge	14 February 2005	
14 January 2005	CB	(England)	Garry Richards	(England) Gravesend & Northfleet	14 February 2005	
14 January 2005	FW	(England)	Tristan Toney	(England) Redbridge	14 February 2005	
27 January 2005	FB/CB	(Cameroon)	George Elokobi	(England) Chester City	27 February 2005	
18 February 2005	CB	(England)	Garry Richards	(England) Redbridge	18 March 2005	
17 March 2005	FB	(England)	Joe Keith	(England) Bristol City	8 May 2005	

== Match details ==
=== League One ===
==== League table ====
Pos	Team	Pld	W	D	L	GF	GA	GD	Pts
13	Barnsley	46	14	19	13	69	64	+5	61
14	Walsall	46	16	12	18	65	69	−4	60
15	Colchester United	46	14	17	15	60	50	+10	59
16	Blackpool	46	15	12	19	54	59	−5	57
17	Chesterfield	46	14	15	17	55	62	−7	57

Updated to match(es) played on May 2005. Source: Soccerbase
Rules for classification: 1) points; 2) goal difference; 3) number of goals scored.

==== Results round by round ====
Round	1	2	3	4	5	6	7	8	9	10	11	12	13	14	15	16	17	18	19	20	21	22	23	24	25	26	27	28	29	30	31	32	33	34	35	36	37	38	39	40	41	42	43	44	45	46
Ground	A	H	H	A	H	A	H	A	H	A	H	A	A	H	H	A	A	H	A	H	H	A	A	A	H	A	H	H	H	A	H	H	A	A	H	A	A	H	A	H	A	H	A	H	A	H
Result	W	W	W	L	W	L	L	W	L	D	W	L	D	L	L	D	D	D	W	L	L	L	D	W	D	L	D	W	L	D	W	L	D	L	L	D	W	D	W	W	D	D	D	D	D	W
Position	1	1	1	3	2	2	4	2	6	6	4	4	6	7	11	13	15	14	13	14	17	18	18	17	18	18	17	15	17	17	15	16	16	17	18	18	16	17	16	14	14	14	14	15	16	15

Source: Statto.com (archived)
A = Away; H = Home; W = Win; D = Draw; L = Loss

==== Matches ====
7 August 2004 1	Sheffield Wednesday	0–3	Colchester United	Sheffield
15:00 BST		Report	Fagan 85'; Stockley 89'; Keith 90'	Stadium: Hillsborough Stadium; Attendance: 24,138; Referee: Paul Taylor

10 August 2004 2	Colchester United	3–2	Stockport County	Colchester
	Watson 19'; Andrews 30'; Fagan 41'	Report	Cartwright 66'; Beckett 79'	Stadium: Layer Road; Attendance: 3,356; Referee: Clive Penton

14 August 2004 3	Colchester United	2–1	Peterborough United	Colchester
15:00 BST	Andrews 58' (pen.); Ireland 64' (o.g.)	Report	Farrell 10'	Stadium: Layer Road; Attendance: 3,754; Referee: Paul Danson

21 August 2004 4	Chesterfield	2–1	Colchester United	Chesterfield
15:00 BST	N'Toya 9', 55'	Report	Johnson 44'; Hunt (red card) 67'	Stadium: Saltergate; Attendance: 4,028; Referee: Andy Hall

28 August 2004 5	Colchester United	4–1	Doncaster Rovers	Colchester
15:00 BST	Fagan 16'; Johnson 22'; Halford 27'; Keith 70'	Report	Doolan 45'	Stadium: Layer Road; Attendance: 3,803; Referee: Grant Hegley

30 August 2004 6	Hartlepool United	2–1	Colchester United	Hartlepool
	Williams 38'; Boyd 70'	Report	Keith 90'	Stadium: Victoria Park; Attendance: 4,371; Referee: Mike Pike

4 September 2004 7	Colchester United	0–1	Swindon Town	Colchester
		Report	Parkin 7'	Stadium: Layer Road; Attendance: 3,868; Referee: Kevin Wright

11 September 2004 8	AFC Bournemouth	1–3	Colchester United	Bournemouth
15:00 BST	Stockley 74' (o.g.)	Report	Fagan 10'; Williams 24'; May 79'	Stadium: Dean Court; Attendance: 5,944; Referee: Joe Ross

18 September 2004 9	Colchester United	0–1	Milton Keynes Dons	Colchester
15:00 BST		Report	McLeod 45'	Stadium: Layer Road; Attendance: 3,460; Referee: Eddie Evans

25 September 2004 10	Oldham Athletic	1–1	Colchester United	Oldham
15:00 BST	Eyres 22'	Report	Halford 56'	Stadium: Boundary Park; Attendance: 5,166; Referee: P Armstrong

2 October 2004 11	Colchester United	2–1	Port Vale	Colchester
15:00 BST	Danns 10', 19'	Report	Matthews 83'	Stadium: Layer Road; Attendance: 3,230; Referee: Martin Atkinson

9 October 2004 12	Walsall	2–1	Colchester United	Walsall
13:00 BST	Bennett 73'; Emblen 84'	Report	Garcia 71'	Stadium: Bescot Stadium; Attendance: 5,203; Referee: Richard Beeby

16 October 2004 13	Blackpool	1–1	Colchester United	Blackpool
15:00 BST	Murphy 10'	Report	Watson 80'	Stadium: Bloomfield Road; Attendance: 6,464; Referee: Andy Penn

19 October 2004 14	Colchester United	1–2	Wrexham	Colchester
19:45 BST	Danns 49'	Report	Roberts 59'; Llewellyn 90'	Stadium: Layer Road; Attendance: 2,866; Referee: Keith Stroud

23 October 2004 15	Colchester United	1–2	Tranmere Rovers	Colchester
15:00 BST	Halford 83'	Report	Dagnall 29'; Zola 81'	Stadium: Layer Road; Attendance: 3,420; Referee: Keith Hill

30 October 2004 16	Bristol City	0–0	Colchester United	Bristol
15:00 BST		Report		Stadium: Ashton Gate Stadium; Attendance: 11,678; Referee: Peter Walton

6 November 2004 17	Bradford City	2–2	Colchester United	Bradford
15:00 GMT	Windass 23', 81'	Report	Johnson 8', 39'	Stadium: Valley Parade; Attendance: 7,851; Referee: Clive Oliver

20 November 2004 18	Colchester United	0–0	Huddersfield Town	Colchester
15:00 GMT		Report		Stadium: Layer Road; Attendance: 3,972; Referee: Mick Russell

27 November 2004 19	Torquay United	1–3	Colchester United	Torquay
15:00 GMT	Gritton 74' (pen.)	Report	Fagan 67', 72'; Garcia 78'	Stadium: Plainmoor; Attendance: 2,984; Referee: Mark Warren

7 December 2004 20	Colchester United	0–2	Barnsley	Colchester
19:45 GMT	Fagan (yellow card) 90' (red card)	Report	Kay 34', 54'	Stadium: Layer Road; Attendance: 2,927; Referee: Clive Penton

11 December 2004 21	Colchester United	1–2	Hull City	Colchester
15:00 GMT	Williams 73'	Report	France 11'; Elliott 50'	Stadium: Layer Road; Attendance: 4,046; Referee: Steve Tanner

18 December 2004 22	Brentford	1–0	Colchester United	Brentford
15:00 GMT	Salako 45'	Report		Stadium: Griffin Park; Attendance: 5,634; Referee: Paul Robinson

28 December 2004 23	Luton Town	2–2	Colchester United	Luton
15:00 GMT	Vine 37', 48'	Report	Garcia 34'; Halford 62'	Stadium: Kenilworth Road; Attendance: 8,806; Referee: Alan Kaye

1 January 2005 24	Swindon Town	0–3	Colchester United	Swindon
15:00 GMT		Report	Johnson 31'; Danns 38'; Garcia 47'	Stadium: County Ground; Attendance: 6,468; Referee: Iain Williamson

3 January 2005 25	Colchester United	0–0	Oldham Athletic	Colchester
15:00 GMT		Report		Stadium: Layer Road; Attendance: 3,873; Referee: Paul Danson

15 January 2005 26	Milton Keynes Dons	2–0	Colchester United	Milton Keynes
15:00 GMT	Harding 2'; Small 18'	Report		Stadium: National Hockey Stadium; Attendance: 3,833; Referee: R Booth

22 January 2005 27	Colchester United	0–0	Luton Town	Colchester
15:00 GMT		Report		Stadium: Layer Road; Attendance: 4,309; Referee: Mike Dean

25 January 2005 28	Colchester United	5–0	Walsall	Colchester
19:45 GMT	Fagan 18' (pen.), 22'; Johnson 34'; Williams 44'; Hunt 90'	Report		Stadium: Layer Road; Attendance: 2,616; Referee: Mike Thorpe

5 February 2005 29	Colchester United	0–1	Blackpool	Colchester
15:00 GMT		Report	Grayson 75'	Stadium: Layer Road; Attendance: 3,526; Referee: B Curson

12 February 2005 30	Tranmere Rovers	1–1	Colchester United	Birkenhead
	Dadi 8'	Report	Keith 65'	Stadium: Prenton Park; Attendance: 8,098; Referee: Scott Mathieson

15 February 2005 31	Colchester United	3–1	AFC Bournemouth	Colchester
19:45 GMT	Johnson 54'; Ndumbu-Nsungu 82'; Danns 83'	Report	Cummings 47'	Stadium: Layer Road; Attendance: 2,820; Referee: Kevin Friend

19 February 2005 32	Colchester United	0–2	Bristol City	Colchester
15:00 GMT		Report	Brooker 51'; Lita 71'	Stadium: Layer Road; Attendance: 3,412; Referee: Paul Taylor

22 February 2005 33	Wrexham	2–2	Colchester United	Wrexham
	Jones 50'; Sam 80'	Report	Danns 60'; Brown 71'	Stadium: Racecourse Ground; Attendance: 2,391; Referee: Graham Salisbury

26 February 2005 34	Hull City	2–0	Colchester United	Kingston upon Hull
	Cort 16'; Barmby 33'	Report		Stadium: KC Stadium; Attendance: 16,484; Referee: Nigel Miller

5 March 2005 35	Colchester United	0–1	Brentford	Colchester
15:00 GMT		Report	Tabb 58'	Stadium: Layer Road; Attendance: 3,066; Referee: Phil Prosser

8 March 2005 36	Port Vale	0–0	Colchester United	Burslem
	Cummins (yellow card) 68' (red card); Reid (red card) 82'	Report	Chilvers (yellow card) 45' (red card)	Stadium: Vale Park; Attendance: 3,496; Referee: Paul Robinson

12 March 2005 37	Stockport County	1–2	Colchester United	Stockport
15:00 GMT	Feeney 4'	Report	Danns 30' (pen.), 90'	Stadium: Edgeley Park; Attendance: 4,004; Referee: Andy Hall

19 March 2005 38	Colchester United	1–1	Sheffield Wednesday	Colchester
15:00 GMT	Heckingbottom 48' (o.g.)	Report	McGovern 63'	Stadium: Layer Road; Attendance: 4,169; Referee: Richard Beeby

25 March 2005 39	Peterborough United	0–3	Colchester United	Peterborough
15:00 GMT		Report	Goodfellow 45'; Danns 70'; Keith 83' (pen.)	Stadium: London Road Stadium; Attendance: 4,084; Referee: Uriah Rennie

28 March 2005 40	Colchester United	1–0	Chesterfield	Colchester
15:00 BST	Keith 76'	Report		Stadium: Layer Road; Attendance: 3,471; Referee: Clive Penton

1 April 2005 41	Doncaster Rovers	1–1	Colchester United	Doncaster
19:45 BST	Guy 76'	Report	Keith 14'	Stadium: Belle Vue; Attendance: 6,774; Referee: Anthony Leake

9 April 2005 42	Colchester United	1–1	Hartlepool United	Colchester
15:00 BST	Johnson 39'	Report	Sweeney 54'	Stadium: Layer Road; Attendance: 3,148; Referee: Mark Warren

16 April 2005 43	Huddersfield Town	2–2	Colchester United	Huddersfield
	Abbott 20'; Schofield 62'	Report	Danns 19'; Chilvers 90'	Stadium: Kirklees Stadium; Attendance: 10,831; Referee: Andy Woolmer

23 April 2005 44	Colchester United	0–0	Bradford City	Colchester
15:00 BST		Report		Stadium: Layer Road; Attendance: 3,351; Referee: Trevor Parkes

30 April 2005 45	Barnsley	1–1	Colchester United	Barnsley
15:00 BST	Nardiello 41'	Report	Johnson 88'	Stadium: Oakwell; Attendance: 8,162; Referee: Peter Walton

7 May 2005 46	Colchester United	2–1	Torquay United	Colchester
15:00 BST	Danns 42'; Keith 89'	Report	Woodman 90'	Stadium: Layer Road; Attendance: 4,834; Referee: Kevin Friend

=== Football League Cup ===
24 August 2004 1st round	Colchester United	2–1	Cheltenham Town	Colchester
19:45 BST	Fagan 12'; Johnson 61'	Report	Devaney 70'	Stadium: Layer Road; Attendance: 2,144; Referee: P Crossley

21 September 2004 2nd round	Colchester United	2–1 (a.e.t.)	West Bromwich Albion	Colchester
19:45 BST	Fagan 29'; May 117'	Report	Horsfield 50'	Stadium: Layer Road; Attendance: 4,591; Referee: Alan Kaye

27 October 2004 3rd round	Southampton	3–2	Colchester United	Southampton
19:45 BST	Blackstock 50', 54', 80'	Report	Danns 7'; Halford 64'	Stadium: St Mary's Stadium; Attendance: 20,588; Referee: Mike Jones

=== Football League Trophy ===
29 September 2004 1st round (southern section)	Colchester United	1–1 (a.e.t.) (3–5 p)	Southend United	Colchester
20:00 BST	Garcia 63'	Report	Bramble 40'; Bentley (red card) 114'	Stadium: Layer Road; Attendance: 3,469; Referee: Paul Robinson

=== FA Cup ===
13 November 2004 1st round	Mansfield Town	1–1	Colchester United	Mansfield
15:00 GMT	Baptiste 28'; Asamoah (red card) 81'	Report	Halford 25'	Stadium: Field Mill; Attendance: 3,202; Referee: Phil Prosser

23 November 2004 1st round replay	Colchester United	4–1	Mansfield Town	Colchester
19:45 GMT	Garcia 10'; Curtis 14' (o.g.); Fagan 67' (pen.); Williams 90' (pen.)	Report	Neil 86'	Stadium: Layer Road; Attendance: 2,492; Referee: Keith Hill

4 December 2004 2nd round	Rushden & Diamonds	2–5	Colchester United	Irthlingborough
15:00 GMT	Broughton 82'; Gray 86'	Report	Halford 4', 47', 90'; Fagan 25', 35'	Stadium: Nene Park; Attendance: 3,077; Referee: Trevor Kettle

8 January 2005 3rd round	Hull City	0–2	Colchester United	Kingston upon Hull
15:00 GMT		Report	Williams 27'; Fagan 29'	Stadium: KC Stadium; Attendance: 14,027; Referee: Phil Joslin

29 January 2005 4th round	Blackburn Rovers	3–0	Colchester United	Blackburn
15:00 GMT	Watson 21' (o.g.); Johnson 27'; Matteo 51'	Report		Stadium: Ewood Park; Attendance: 10,634; Referee: Howard Webb

== Squad statistics ==
=== Appearances and goals ===
No.	Pos	Nat	Player	Total		League One		FA Cup		League Cup		Football League Trophy	
No.	Pos	Nat	Player	Apps	Goals	Apps	Goals	Apps	Goals	Apps	Goals	Apps	Goals
1	GK	(Northern Ireland) NIR	Aidan Davison	39	0	33	0	3	0	2	0	1	0
2	DF	(England) ENG	Greg Halford	53	9	43+1	4	5	4	2+1	1	1	0
3	DF	(England) ENG	Joe Keith	40	4	27+4	4	4+1	0	3	0	1	0
4	MF	(England) ENG	Gavin Johnson	44	10	36+1	9	4	0	2	1	1	0
5	DF	(England) ENG	Wayne Brown	47	1	38+2	1	2+1	0	3	0	1	0
6	MF	(England) ENG	Kevin Watson	53	2	44	2	5	0	3	0	1	0
8	FW	(Wales) WAL	Gareth Williams	34	5	12+17	3	2+1	2	1	0	1	0
9	FW	(Scotland) SCO	Marino Keith	12	4	12	4	0	0	0	0	0	0
10	MF	(England) ENG	Kemal Izzet	4	0	3+1	0	0	0	0	0	0	0
11	FW	(England) ENG	Jamie Cade	14	0	4+5	0	0+3	0	1	0	0+1	0
12	DF	(England) ENG	Pat Baldwin	46	0	35+3	0	5	0	2	0	1	0
13	GK	(England) ENG	Dean Gerken	16	0	13	0	2	0	1	0	0	0
14	DF	(England) ENG	Stephen Hunt	25	1	16+4	1	1+1	0	2	0	1	0
15	MF	(England) ENG	Ben Bowditch	7	0	0+5	0	0+1	0	0+1	0	0	0
17	MF	(Saint Kitts and Nevis) SKN	Bobby Bowry	15	0	7+4	0	1+1	0	0+1	0	1	0
18	DF	(England) ENG	Liam Chilvers	48	1	40+1	1	4+1	0	2	0	0	0
23	DF	(England) ENG	John White	24	0	16+4	0	3	0	0+1	0	0	0
25	DF	(England) ENG	Sam Stockley	44	1	33+4	1	5	0	2	0	0	0
26	MF	(Guyana) GUY	Neil Danns	36	12	32	11	1	0	2	1	1	0
28	MF	(Australia) AUS	Richard Garcia	30	6	20+4	4	3	1	1+1	0	1	1
29	FW	(England) ENG	Jamie Guy	2	0	0+2	0	0	0	0	0	0	0
Players who appeared for Colchester who left during the season
8	FW	(England) ENG	Wayne Andrews	6	2	4+1	2	0	0	1	0	0	0
9	FW	(England) ENG	Craig Fagan	34	14	25+1	8	5	4	3	2	0	0
20	FW	(England) ENG	Marc Goodfellow	5	1	4+1	1	0	0	0	0	0	0
20	FW	(England) ENG	Ben May	16	2	5+9	1	0	0	0+2	1	0	0
24	FW	(Democratic Republic of the Congo) COD	Guylain Ndumbu-Nsungu	9	1	2+6	1	0+1	0	0	0	0	0
30	FW	(England) ENG	Ryan Jarvis	6	0	2+4	0	0	0	0	0	0	0

=== Goalscorers ===
Place	Number	Nationality	Position	Name	League One	FA Cup	League Cup	Football League Trophy	Total
1	9	(England)	FW	Craig Fagan	8	4	2	0	14
2	26	(Guyana)	MF	Neil Danns	11	0	1	0	12
3	4	(England)	MF	Gavin Johnson	9	0	1	0	10
4	2	(England)	FB/MF	Greg Halford	4	4	1	0	9
5	28	(Australia)	MF	Richard Garcia	4	1	0	1	6
6	8	(Wales)	FW	Gareth Williams	3	2	0	0	5
7	3	(England)	FB	Joe Keith	4	0	0	0	4
7	9	(Scotland)	FW	Marino Keith	4	0	0	0	4
9	6	(England)	MF	Kevin Watson	2	0	0	0	2
9	8	(England)	FW	Wayne Andrews	2	0	0	0	2
9	20	(England)	FW	Ben May	1	0	1	0	2
12	5	(England)	CB	Wayne Brown	1	0	0	0	1
12	14	(England)	FB	Stephen Hunt	1	0	0	0	1
12	18	(England)	CB	Liam Chilvers	1	0	0	0	1
12	20	(England)	WG	Marc Goodfellow	1	0	0	0	1
12	24	(Democratic Republic of the Congo)	FW	Guylain Ndumbu-Nsungu	1	0	0	0	1
12	25	(England)	FB	Sam Stockley	1	0	0	0	1
				Own goals	2	1	0	0	3
				TOTALS	60	12	6	1	79

=== Disciplinary record ===
Number	Nationality	Position	Name	League One		FA Cup		League Cup		Football League Trophy		Total	
Number	Nationality	Position	Name	Booked	Sent off (straight red)	Booked	Sent off (straight red)	Booked	Sent off (straight red)	Booked	Sent off (straight red)	Booked	Sent off (straight red)
9	(England)	FW	Craig Fagan	10	1	2	0	1	0	0	0	13	1
26	(Guyana)	MF	Neil Danns	11	0	0	0	1	0	0	0	12	0
18	(Guyana)	CB	Liam Chilvers	6	1	0	0	0	0	0	0	6	1
2	(England)	FB/MF	Greg Halford	5	0	0	0	0	0	0	0	5	0
12	(England)	CB	Pat Baldwin	2	0	1	0	1	0	1	0	5	0
14	(England)	FB	Stephen Hunt	1	1	0	0	0	0	1	0	2	1
5	(England)	CB	Wayne Brown	4	0	0	0	0	0	0	0	4	0
3	(England)	FB	Joe Keith	2	0	1	0	0	0	0	0	3	0
4	(England)	MF	Gavin Johnson	3	0	0	0	0	0	0	0	3	0
25	(England)	FB	Sam Stockley	3	0	0	0	0	0	0	0	3	0
6	(England)	MF	Kevin Watson	2	0	0	0	0	0	0	0	2	0
28	(Australia)	MF	Richard Garcia	2	0	0	0	0	0	0	0	2	0
1	(Northern Ireland)	GK	Aidan Davison	1	0	0	0	0	0	0	0	1	0
9	(Scotland)	FW	Marino Keith	1	0	0	0	0	0	0	0	1	0
24	(Democratic Republic of the Congo)	FW	Guylain Ndumbu-Nsungu	1	0	0	0	0	0	0	0	1	0
			TOTALS	54	3	4	0	3	0	2	0	63	3

=== Clean sheets ===
Number of games goalkeepers kept a clean sheet.

Place	Number	Nationality	Player	League One	FA Cup	League Cup	Football League Trophy	Total
1	1	(Northern Ireland)	Aidan Davison	8	0	0	0	8
2	13	(England)	Dean Gerken	3	1	0	0	4
			TOTALS	11	1	0	0	12

=== Player debuts ===
Players making their first-team Colchester United debut in a fully competitive match.

Number	Position	Nationality	Player	Date	Opponent	Ground	Notes
1	GK	(Northern Ireland)	Aidan Davison	7 August 2004	Sheffield Wednesday	Hillsborough Stadium	
5	CB	(England)	Wayne Brown	7 August 2004	Sheffield Wednesday	Hillsborough Stadium	(Note: Third debut for the club)
6	MF	(England)	Kevin Watson	7 August 2004	Sheffield Wednesday	Hillsborough Stadium	
18	CB	(England)	Liam Chilvers	7 August 2004	Sheffield Wednesday	Hillsborough Stadium	
20	FW	(England)	Ben May	7 August 2004	Sheffield Wednesday	Hillsborough Stadium	(Note: Second debut for the club)
14	FB	(England)	Stephen Hunt	21 August 2004	Chesterfield	Saltergate	
15	MF	(England)	Ben Bowditch	24 August 2004	Cheltenham Town	Layer Road	
23	FB	(England)	John White	24 August 2004	Cheltenham Town	Layer Road	
8	FW	(Wales)	Gareth Williams	4 September 2004	Swindon Town	Layer Road	
28	MF	(Australia)	Richard Garcia	4 September 2004	Swindon Town	Layer Road	
26	MF	(Guyana)	Neil Danns	11 September 2004	AFC Bournemouth	Dean Court	
26	MF	(Guyana)	Neil Danns	28 December 2004	Luton Town	Kenilworth Road	
24	FW	(Democratic Republic of the Congo)	Guylain Ndumbu-Nsungu	22 January 2005	Luton Town	Layer Road	
29	FW	(England)	Jamie Guy	5 February 2005	Blackpool	Layer Road	
9	FW	(Scotland)	Marino Keith	5 March 2005	Brentford	Layer Road	
20	WG	(England)	Marc Goodfellow	19 March 2005	Sheffield Wednesday	Layer Road	
30	FW	(England)	Ryan Jarvis	1 April 2005	Doncaster Rovers	Belle Vue	

== See also ==
- List of Colchester United F.C. seasons
