= 2005–06 Colchester United F.C. season =

Colchester United
2005–06 season
- Chairman: Peter Heard
- Manager: Phil Parkinson
- Stadium: Layer Road
- League One: 2nd (promoted)
- FA Cup: 5th round (eliminated by Chelsea)
- League Cup: 1st round (eliminated by Cardiff City)
- Football League Trophy: Area final (southern section) (eliminated by Swansea City)
- Top goalscorer: League: Chris Iwelumo (17); All: Chris Iwelumo (19)
- Highest home attendance: 5,933 v Derby County, 28 January 2006
- Lowest home attendance: 1,719 v Northampton Town, 23 November 2005
- Average home league attendance: 3,843
- Biggest win: 9–1 v Leamington, 5 November 2005
- Biggest defeat: 0–3 v Southend United, 4 March 2006
Home colours

The 2005–06 season was Colchester United's 64th season in their history and their eighth successive season in the third tier of English football, League One. Alongside competing in League One, the club also participated in the FA Cup, the League Cup and the Football League Trophy.

The season was hugely successful for the U's as they achieved their first-ever promotion to the second tier of English football by finishing second in League One. They finished runners-up to Essex derby rivals Southend United by three points. Southend were successful in beating Colchester home and away across the season.

Colchester had another long set of cup runs, reaching the fifth round of the FA Cup where they were defeated 3–1 by Premier League champions Chelsea at Stamford Bridge. They had beaten Leamington, Shrewsbury Town, Sheffield United and Derby County en route to the tie with Chelsea. They also embarked on a Football League Trophy run, once more reaching the area final but lost 3–1 on aggregate to eventual winners Swansea City.

== Season overview ==
Colchester started the new season poorly. At the end of August after six games, they found themselves in the relegation zone with one win and two draws. Phil Parkinson had made a number of changes to his playing staff over the summer with numerous outgoings. He had signed Chris Iwelumo from Alemannia Aachen on a permanent basis and brought in Mark Yeates on loan from Tottenham Hotspur. It wasn't until Jamie Cureton arrived on loan from Swindon Town that the U's had an upturn in form as they earned five consecutive wins and went eight matches unbeaten.

By Christmas, Colchester were in the top four but their unbeaten run was ended by Swindon on Boxing Day. They recovered from this setback to embark on another winning streak, earning seven wins on the bounce, ten matches including cup ties and sat top of the table by the end of January. Their form fell away in mid February and through March into April when they picked up just one win in 10 games, dropping from the automatic promotion places to the play-off spots.

Meanwhile, in the FA Cup, Colchester had progressed to the fifth round to set up a tie with Premier League champions Chelsea at Stamford Bridge. The club equalled a 44-year-old record by beating Leamington 9–1 in the first round, and then saw off the challenge of Shrewsbury Town, and then Championship sides Sheffield United and Derby County.

José Mourinho's Chelsea side had been assembled for around £225m, while Colchester United's squad had a value of approximately £150,000. More than 6,000 U's fans travelled to the game and were given an early treat when the underdogs took the lead through a Ricardo Carvalho own goal in the 28th minute. Paulo Ferreira equalised ten minutes later as the sides went into half time with the score level. At half time, Mourinho made two changes, introducing star players Frank Lampard and Joe Cole. He then sent on Hernán Crespo with the score still level up until the 79th minute when Cole struck to give Chelsea the lead. He added a second in the final minute of the game to hand the hosts a 3–1 victory.

The U's again reached the area final of the Football League Trophy, but lost over two legs to eventual winners Swansea City.

In the closing stages of the season, Colchester returned to winning ways and to the automatic promotion places with four games remaining. Wins against AFC Bournemouth and Rotherham United meant United only had to secure a draw in their final game of the season at Yeovil Town. The U's nervously held on to a 0–0 draw to gain promotion to the Championship, finishing the campaign behind leaders and rivals Southend United. Southend had beaten Colchester twice over the course of the season as they finished three points shy of the title.

== Players ==
As of match played 6 May 2006.

No.	Name	Position	Nationality	Place of birth	Date of birth	Apps	Goals	Signed from	Date signed	Fee
Goalkeepers
1	Aidan Davison	GK	(Northern Ireland)	(England) Sedgefield	11 May 1968 (aged 37)	39	0	(England) Grimsby Town	5 July 2004	Free transfer
13	Dean Gerken	GK	(England)	Southend-on-Sea	22 May 1985 (aged 20)	17	0	Youth team	1 August 2002	Free transfer
23	Mark Cousins	GK	(England)	Chelmsford	9 January 1987 (aged 18)	0	0	Youth team	1 August 2004	Free transfer
Defenders
2	Greg Halford	FB/MF	(England)	Chelmsford	8 December 1984 (aged 20)	78	13	Youth team	1 August 2002	Free transfer
3	Stephen Hunt	FB	(England)	Southampton	11 November 1984 (aged 20)	25	1	(England) Southampton	5 July 2004	Free transfer
5	Wayne Brown	CB	(England)	Barking	20 August 1977 (aged 27)	66	1	(England) Watford	8 July 2004	Free transfer
12	Pat Baldwin	CB	(England)	City of London	12 November 1982 (aged 22)	75	0	(England) Chelsea	16 August 2002	Free transfer
16	George Elokobi	FB/CB	(Cameroon)	Mamfe	31 January 1986 (aged 19)	0	0	(England) Dulwich Hamlet	1 August 2004	Free transfer
18	Liam Chilvers	CB	(England)	Chelmsford	6 November 1981 (aged 23)	99	1	(England) Arsenal	10 June 2004	Free transfer
17	John White	FB	(England)	Colchester	26 July 1986 (aged 18)	24	0	Youth team	1 July 2003	Free transfer
19	Garry Richards	CB	(England)	Romford	11 June 1986 (aged 18)	0	0	Youth team	1 July 2004	Free transfer
25	Sam Stockley	FB	(England)	Tiverton	5 September 1977 (aged 27)	137	2	(England) Oxford United	31 October 2002	Free transfer
30	Matthew Paine	DF	(England)	Sidcup	22 December 1987 (aged 17)	0	0	Youth team	18 December 2005	Free transfer
Midfielders
4	Neil Danns	MF	(Guyana)	(England) Liverpool	23 November 1982 (aged 22)	36	12	(England) Blackburn Rovers	23 December 2004	Nominal
6	Kevin Watson	MF	(England)	Hackney	3 January 1974 (aged 31)	53	2	(England) Reading	5 July 2004	Free transfer
7	Karl Duguid	MF	(England)	Letchworth	21 March 1978 (aged 27)	308	39	Youth team	9 December 1995 (Note: Date of signing refers to the date of the player's first game for the club)	Free transfer
10	Kemal Izzet	MF	(England)	Whitechapel	29 September 1980 (aged 24)	159	18	(England) Charlton Athletic	13 April 2001	Free transfer
21	Robbie King	MF	(England)	Chelmsford	1 October 1986 (aged 18)	0	0	Youth team	1 July 2004	Free transfer
22	Russell Pond	MF	(England)	Leytonstone	27 January 1987 (aged 18)	0	0	Youth team	1 July 2005	Free transfer
28	Richard Garcia	MF	(Australia)	Perth	4 September 1981 (aged 23)	30	6	(England) West Ham United	3 September 2004	Nominal
Forwards
8	Gareth Williams	FW	(Wales)	Cardiff	10 September 1982 (aged 22)	49	13	(England) Crystal Palace	31 August 2004	Part-exchange
9	Marino Keith	FW	(Scotland)	Peterhead	16 December 1974 (aged 30)	12	4	(England) Plymouth Argyle	1 March 2005	Free transfer
11	Chris Iwelumo	FW	(Scotland)	Coatbridge	1 August 1978 (aged 26)	0	0	(Germany) Alemannia Aachen	6 July 2005	Free transfer
15	Jamie Guy	FW	(England)	Barking	1 August 1987 (aged 17)	2	0	Youth team	1 July 2004	Free transfer
26	Tony Thorpe	FW	(England)	Leicester	10 April 1974 (aged 31)	0	0	(England) Swindon Town	11 January 2006	Free transfer
27	Craig Hughes	FW	(England)	Canterbury	26 November 1987 (aged 17)	0	0	Youth team	24 January 2006	Free transfer

== Transfers ==
=== In ===
Date	Position	Nationality	Name	From	Fee	Ref.
1 July 2005	MF	(England)	Russell Pond	Youth team	Free transfer	
6 July 2005	FW	(Scotland)	Chris Iwelumo	(Germany) Alemannia Aachen	Free transfer	
1 August 2005	MF	(England)	Dean Howell	(England) Halifax Town	Free transfer	
18 December 2005	DF	(England)	Matthew Paine	Youth team	Free transfer	
11 January 2006	FW	(England)	Tony Thorpe	(England) Swindon Town	Free transfer	
24 January 2006	FW	(England)	Craig Hughes	Youth team	Free transfer	

- Total spending: ▼ ~ £0

=== Out ===
Date	Position	Nationality	Name	To	Fee	Ref.
6 June 2005	MF	(England)	Gavin Johnson	(England) Boston United	Released	
24 June 2005	FB	(England)	Joe Keith	(England) Leyton Orient	Released	
30 June 2005	MF	(England)	Ben Bowditch	(England) Barnet	Released	
30 June 2005	MF/FW	(England)	Liam Coleman	(England) Torquay United	Released	
30 June 2005	MF	(England)	Craig Johnston	(England) Heybridge Swifts	Undisclosed	
30 June 2005	FW	(England)	Tristan Toney	Free agent	Released	
18 July 2005	MF	(Saint Kitts and Nevis)	Bobby Bowry	(England) Gravesend & Northfleet	Released	
8 August 2005	FW	(England)	Jamie Cade	(England) Crawley Town	Released	
17 February 2006	MF	(England)	Dean Howell	(England) Halifax Town	Released	

- Total incoming: ▲ ~ £0

=== Loans in ===
Date	Position	Nationality	Name	From	End date	Ref.
5 August 2005	WG	(Republic of Ireland)	Mark Yeates	(England) Tottenham Hotspur	7 May 2006	
21 October 2005	FW	(England)	Jamie Cureton	(England) Swindon Town	3 January 2006	
17 March 2006	FW	(England)	Scott Vernon	(England) Blackpool	7 May 2006	
22 March 2006	FW	(Republic of Ireland)	Billy Clarke	(England) Ipswich Town	7 May 2006	
23 March 2006	WG	(Jamaica)	Jamal Campbell-Ryce	(England) Rotherham United	7 May 2006	

=== Loans out ===
Date	Position	Nationality	Name	To	End date	Ref.
October 2005	MF	(England)	Robbie King	(England) Staines Town	October 2005	
6 October 2005	FW	(England)	Jamie Guy	(England) Gravesend & Northfleet	6 November 2005	
24 October 2005	FW	(England)	Jamie Guy	(England) Staines Town	24 November 2005	
9 February 2006	FW	(England)	Jamie Guy	(England) Cambridge United	30 April 2006	
19 February 2006	MF	(England)	Robbie King	(England) Hereford United	End of season	
17 March 2006	FB	(England)	Sam Stockley	(England) Blackpool	7 May 2006	
17 March 2006	FW	(Wales)	Gareth Williams	(England) Blackpool	7 May 2006	

== Match details ==
=== League One ===
==== League table ====
Pos	Team	Pld	W	D	L	GF	GA	GD	Pts	Qualification or relegation
1	Southend United (C, P)	46	23	13	10	72	43	+29	82	Promotion to the Championship
2	Colchester United (P)	46	22	13	11	58	40	+18	79	Promotion to the Championship
3	Brentford	46	20	16	10	72	52	+20	76	Qualification for the League One play-offs
4	Huddersfield Town	46	19	16	11	72	59	+13	73	Qualification for the League One play-offs
5	Barnsley (O, P)	46	18	18	10	62	44	+18	72	Qualification for the League One play-offs

Rules for classification: 1) Points; 2) Goal difference; 3) Goals scored
(C) Champions; (O) Play-off winners; (P) Promoted

==== Results round by round ====
Round	1	2	3	4	5	6	7	8	9	10	11	12	13	14	15	16	17	18	19	20	21	22	23	24	25	26	27	28	29	30	31	32	33	34	35	36	37	38	39	40	41	42	43	44	45	46
Ground	A	H	H	A	H	A	A	H	A	H	A	H	A	H	A	H	A	H	H	A	A	H	A	A	H	A	H	H	H	H	A	H	A	H	A	H	A	A	H	A	H	A	H	A	H	A
Result	L	L	W	D	D	L	D	W	W	D	D	L	W	L	D	W	W	W	W	W	D	W	L	W	W	W	W	W	W	W	L	D	L	L	L	W	D	D	D	L	W	D	W	W	W	D
Position	15	23	18	18	18	22	20	15	13	15	15	16	13	15	16	13	11	8	7	6	6	4	6	5	4	4	2	1	2	1	2	2	3	5	6	5	5	4	4	4	3	3	2	2	2	2

Source: Statto.com (archived)
A = Away; H = Home; W = Win; D = Draw; L = Loss

==== Matches ====
6 August 2005 1	Gillingham	2–1	Colchester United	Gillingham
15:00 BST	Crofts 75'; Byfield 89'	Report	Danns 50'	Stadium: Priestfield Stadium; Attendance: 7,293; Referee: Phil Joslin

9 August 2005 2	Colchester United	1–2	Swansea City	Colchester
19:45 BST	Halford 67'	Report	Forbes 35'; Trundle 68'	Stadium: Layer Road; Attendance: 2,950; Referee: Jarnail Singh

13 August 2005 3	Colchester United	1–0	Barnsley	Colchester
15:00 BST	Iwelumo 48'	Report		Stadium: Layer Road; Attendance: 2,721; Referee: Trevor Parkes

20 August 2005 4	Milton Keynes Dons	1–1	Colchester United	Milton Keynes
15:00 BST	Wilbraham 23'	Report	Chilvers 79'; Davison (red card) 69'	Stadium: National Hockey Stadium; Attendance: 4,423; Referee: Kevin Wright

27 August 2005 5	Colchester United	0–0	Oldham Athletic	Colchester
15:00 BST		Report		Stadium: Layer Road; Attendance: 2,742; Referee: Dermot Gallagher

29 August 2005 6	Southend United	3–1	Colchester United	Southend-on-Sea
12:00 BST	Goater 3', 78'; Cole 30'	Report	Stockley 19'	Stadium: Roots Hall; Attendance: 7,344; Referee: Rob Styles

3 September 2005 7	Bristol City	0–0	Colchester United	Bristol
		Report	Brown (red card) 59'	Stadium: Ashton Gate Stadium; Attendance: 10,180; Referee: Ray Olivier

10 September 2005 8	Colchester United	3–2	Doncaster Rovers	Colchester
15:00 BST	Iwelumo 1'; McDaid 23' (o.g.); Foster 27' (o.g.)	Report	Forte 5'; McIndoe 53' (pen.)	Stadium: Layer Road; Attendance: 2,721; Referee: Paul Taylor

17 September 2005 9	Port Vale	0–1	Colchester United	Burslem
		Report	Iwelumo 34'	Stadium: Vale Park; Attendance: 5,166; Referee: Colin Webster

24 September 2005 10	Colchester United	1–1	Huddersfield Town	Colchester
15:00 BST	Elokobi 49'	Report	Taylor-Fletcher 65'	Stadium: Layer Road; Attendance: 3,415; Referee: Mick Russell

27 September 2005 11	Bradford City	1–1	Colchester United	Bradford
	Petta 84'	Report	Halford 62'	Stadium: Valley Parade; Attendance: 6,891; Referee: Mike Jones

1 October 2005 12	Colchester United	1–2	Chesterfield	Colchester
15:00 BST	Iwelumo 90'	Report	Larkin 25'; Hall 49'	Stadium: Layer Road; Attendance: 3,414; Referee: Richard Beeby

9 October 2005 13	Blackpool	1–2	Colchester United	Blackpool
	Wright 90'	Report	Halford 16', 90'	Stadium: Bloomfield Road; Attendance: 4,793; Referee: Chris Foy

15 October 2005 14	Colchester United	0–1	AFC Bournemouth	Colchester
15:00 BST		Report	Keene 90'	Stadium: Layer Road; Attendance: 3,120; Referee: R Booth

22 October 2005 15	Tranmere Rovers	0–0	Colchester United	Birkenhead
		Report		Stadium: Prenton Park; Attendance: 6,612; Referee: Scott Mathieson

29 October 2005 16	Colchester United	3–2	Yeovil Town	Colchester
	Iwelumo 43', 90'; Cureton 68'	Report	Bastianini 32'; Harrold 51'	Stadium: Layer Road; Attendance: 3,409; Referee: Matt Messias

12 November 2005 17	Rotherham United	1–2	Colchester United	Rotherham
14:00 GMT	Burton 23' (pen.)	Report	Barker 55' (o.g.); Iwelumo 85'	Stadium: Millmoor; Attendance: 3,715; Referee: Graham Salisbury

19 November 2005 18	Colchester United	3–2	Blackpool	Colchester
15:00 GMT	Iwelumo 34', 54' (pen.); Halford 81'	Report	Murphy 67'; Wright 90'	Stadium: Layer Road; Attendance: 3,031; Referee: Grant Hegley

26 November 2005 19	Colchester United	5–0	Gillingham	Colchester
15:00 GMT	Halford 32', 52'; Cureton 54', 66'; Brown 70'	Report		Stadium: Layer Road; Attendance: 3,801; Referee: Jarnail Singh

6 December 2005 20	Hartlepool United	0–1	Colchester United	Hartlepool
		Report	Cureton 60'	Stadium: Victoria Park; Attendance: 3,375; Referee: Mike Dean

10 December 2005 21	Swansea City	1–1	Colchester United	Swansea
15:00 GMT	Robinson 30'	Report	Iwelumo 13'	Stadium: Liberty Stadium; Attendance: 13,230; Referee: Mike Jones

17 December 2005 22	Colchester United	2–0	Milton Keynes Dons	Colchester
15:00 GMT	Danns 13'; Iwelumo 90' (pen.)	Report		Stadium: Layer Road; Attendance: 3,400; Referee: P Melin

26 December 2005 23	Swindon Town	1–0	Colchester United	Swindon
	Fallon 90'	Report		Stadium: County Ground; Attendance: 5,531; Referee: Kevin Friend

31 December 2005 24	Brentford	0–2	Colchester United	Brentford
		Report	Yeates 30', 86'	Stadium: Griffin Park; Attendance: 6,397; Referee: Peter Walton

2 January 2006 25	Colchester United	3–1	Nottingham Forest	Colchester
15:00 GMT	Danns 71'; Yeates 90'; Garcia 90'	Report	Tyson 90'	Stadium: Layer Road; Attendance: 5,767; Referee: P Crossley

14 January 2006 26	Walsall	0–2	Colchester United	Walsall
15:00 GMT		Report	Danns 76'; Iwelumo 88'	Stadium: Bescot Stadium; Attendance: 5,464; Referee: Steve Tanner

17 January 2006 27	Colchester United	3–2	Bristol City	Colchester
19:45 GMT	Williams 27'; Danns 45', 61'	Report	Murray 2'; Stewart 90'	Stadium: Layer Road; Attendance: 4,022; Referee: P Armstrong

21 January 2006 28	Colchester United	2–1	Port Vale	Colchester
15:00 GMT	Garcia 74', 87'	Report	Husbands 79' (pen.)	Stadium: Layer Road; Attendance: 4,316; Referee: Phil Joslin

4 February 2006 29	Colchester United	3–1	Bradford City	Colchester
15:00 GMT	Garcia 41', 53'; Iwelumo 63'	Report	Windass 37'	Stadium: Layer Road; Attendance: 4,503; Referee: Mick Russell

7 February 2006 30	Colchester United	1–0	Scunthorpe United	Colchester
19:45 GMT	Iwelumo 45'	Report		Stadium: Layer Road; Attendance: 4,416; Referee: Kevin Wright

11 February 2006 31	Huddersfield Town	2–0	Colchester United	Huddersfield
	Worthington 14'; Graham 68'	Report	Richards (red card) 50'	Stadium: Kirklees Stadium; Attendance: 13,515; Referee: Graham Salisbury

14 February 2006 32	Colchester United	0–0	Walsall	Colchester
19:45 GMT		Report		Stadium: Layer Road; Attendance: 3,810; Referee: Pat Miller

25 February 2006 33	Barnsley	1–0	Colchester United	Barnsley
	Howard 72'	Report		Stadium: Oakwell; Attendance: 9,411; Referee: B Curson

4 March 2006 34	Colchester United	0–3	Southend United	Colchester
15:00 GMT		Report	Eastwood 11'; Maher 21'; Wilson 32'	Stadium: Layer Road; Attendance: 5,920; Referee: Lee Mason

11 March 2006 35	Oldham Athletic	1–0	Colchester United	Oldham
	Butcher 90'	Report	Izzet (yellow card) 87' (red card)	Stadium: Boundary Park; Attendance: 5,822; Referee: Darren Drysdale

18 March 2006 36	Colchester United	1–0	Swindon Town	Colchester
15:00 GMT	Iwelumo 15' (pen.)	Report		Stadium: Layer Road; Attendance: 3,767; Referee: Gary Sutton

21 March 2006 37	Doncaster Rovers	0–0	Colchester United	Doncaster
		Report		Stadium: Belle Vue; Attendance: 4,262; Referee: Mike Pike

25 March 2006 38	Scunthorpe United	0–0	Colchester United	Scunthorpe
15:00 GMT		Report		Stadium: Glanford Park; Attendance: 4,608; Referee: Paul Taylor

1 April 2006 39	Colchester United	1–1	Brentford	Colchester
15:00 BST	Iwelumo 31'	Report	Tabb 6'	Stadium: Layer Road; Attendance: 5,635; Referee: R Booth

8 April 2006 40	Nottingham Forest	1–0	Colchester United	West Bridgford
15:00 BST	Perch 72'	Report		Stadium: City Ground; Attendance: 22,680; Referee: Iain Williamson

11 April 2006 41	Colchester United	2–0	Hartlepool United	Colchester
19:45 BST	Danns 83', 90'	Report	D. Williams (yellow card) 60' (red card)	Stadium: Layer Road; Attendance: 3,916; Referee: Trevor Kettle

15 April 2006 42	Chesterfield	2–2	Colchester United	Chesterfield
	O'Hara 3'; Hall 18' (pen.)	Report	Yeates 45'; Iwelumo 73'	Stadium: Saltergate; Attendance: 3,649; Referee: Eddie Ilderton

17 April 2006 43	Colchester United	1–0	Tranmere Rovers	Colchester
15:00 BST	Brown 63'	Report	O'Leary (red card) 25'	Stadium: Layer Road; Attendance: 4,757; Referee: Jarnail Singh

22 April 2006 44	AFC Bournemouth	1–2	Colchester United	Bournemouth
15:00 BST	Cooke 8'	Report	Chilvers 5'; Vernon 51'	Stadium: Dean Court; Attendance: 6,231; Referee: Dermot Gallagher

29 April 2006 45	Colchester United	2–0	Rotherham United	Colchester
15:00 BST	Barker 29' (o.g.); Yeates 53'	Report		Stadium: Layer Road; Attendance: 5,741; Referee: Phil Joslin

6 May 2006 46	Yeovil Town	0–0	Colchester United	Yeovil
15:00 BST		Report		Stadium: Huish Park; Attendance: 8,785; Referee: Andre Marriner

=== Football League Cup ===
24 August 2005 1st round	Colchester United	0–2	Cardiff City	Colchester
19:45 BST		Report	Purse 31' (pen.); Jerome 34'	Stadium: Layer Road; Attendance: 1,904; Referee: Richard Beeby

=== FA Cup ===
5 November 2005 1st round	Colchester United	9–1	Leamington	Colchester
15:00 GMT	Halford 39'; Brown 44'; Iwelumo 48'; Cureton 60', 70'; Watson 63'; Yeates 67'; Danns 89', 90'	Report	Adams 72'	Stadium: Layer Road; Attendance: 3,513; Referee: Gary Lewis

3 December 2005 2nd round	Shrewsbury Town	1–2	Colchester United	Shrewsbury
15:00 GMT	Edwards 45'	Report	Cureton 23'; Iwelumo 50'	Stadium: Gay Meadow; Attendance: 3,695; Referee: Steve Tanner

7 January 2006 3rd round	Sheffield United	1–2	Colchester United	Sheffield
15:00 GMT	Kabba 5'	Report	Danns 33'; Williams 72'	Stadium: Bramall Lane; Attendance: 11,820; Referee: Anthony Leake

28 January 2006 4th round	Colchester United	3–1	Derby County	Colchester
15:00 GMT	Danns 44', 52'; Garcia 59'	Report	Smith 79' (pen.)	Stadium: Layer Road; Attendance: 5,933; Referee: B Curson

19 February 2006 5th round	Chelsea	3–1	Colchester United	Fulham
16:00 GMT	Ferreira 37'; J. Cole 79', 90'	Report	Carvalho 28' (o.g.)	Stadium: Stamford Bridge; Attendance: 41,810; Referee: Dermot Gallagher

=== Football League Trophy ===
23 November 2005 2nd round (southern section)	Colchester United	3–2 (a.e.t.)	Northampton Town	Colchester
	Elokobi 57'; Garcia 90'; Danns 101'	Report	Kirk 26'; Bojić 67'	Stadium: Layer Road; Attendance: 1,719; Referee: Clive Penton

20 December 2005 Quarter final (southern section)	Milton Keynes Dons	1–2	Colchester United	Milton Keynes
19:45 GMT	Mills 58'	Report	Duguid 61'; Danns 74'	Stadium: National Hockey Stadium; Attendance: 2,649; Referee: Keith Hill

24 January 2006 Semi final (southern section)	Cheltenham Town	0–1	Colchester United	Cheltenham
		Report	Garcia 21'	Stadium: Whaddon Road; Attendance: 2,243; Referee: Iain Williamson

7 March 2006 Area final (southern section) 1st leg	Swansea City	1–0	Colchester United	Swansea
	Akinfenwa 40'	Report		Stadium: Liberty Stadium; Attendance: 7,285; Referee: Paul Taylor

14 March 2006 Area final (southern section) 2nd leg	Colchester United	1–2	Swansea City	Colchester
19:45 GMT	Danns 46'	Report	Britton 52'; Knight 56'	Stadium: Layer Road; Attendance: 3,236; Referee: P Crossley
Note: Swansea win 3–1 on aggregate.

== Squad statistics ==
=== Appearances and goals ===
No.	Pos	Nat	Player	Total		League One		FA Cup		League Cup		Football League Trophy	
No.	Pos	Nat	Player	Apps	Goals	Apps	Goals	Apps	Goals	Apps	Goals	Apps	Goals
1	GK	(Northern Ireland) NIR	Aidan Davison	45	0	41	0	4	0	0	0	0	0
2	DF	(England) ENG	Greg Halford	55	8	45	7	5	1	1	0	3+1	0
3	DF	(England) ENG	Stephen Hunt	2	0	0+2	0	0	0	0	0	0	0
4	MF	(Guyana) GUY	Neil Danns	51	16	38+3	8	4+1	5	1	0	3+1	3
5	DF	(England) ENG	Wayne Brown	45	3	38	2	4	1	1	0	2	0
6	MF	(England) ENG	Kevin Watson	52	1	43+1	0	4	1	1	0	2+1	0
7	MF	(England) ENG	Karl Duguid	45	1	26+9	0	4+1	0	0	0	5	1
8	FW	(Wales) WAL	Gareth Williams	28	2	6+12	1	0+4	1	0+1	0	4+1	0
10	MF	(England) ENG	Kemal Izzet	41	0	19+14	0	2+1	0	1	0	3+1	0
11	FW	(Scotland) SCO	Chris Iwelumo	55	19	46	17	5	2	1	0	2+1	0
12	DF	(England) ENG	Pat Baldwin	34	0	20+5	0	3	0	1	0	4+1	0
13	GK	(England) ENG	Dean Gerken	14	0	5+2	0	1	0	1	0	5	0
15	FW	(England) ENG	Jamie Guy	6	0	0+2	0	0	0	0	0	1+3	0
16	DF	(Cameroon) CMR	George Elokobi	17	2	10+2	1	0	0	0+1	0	4	1
17	DF	(England) ENG	John White	41	0	32+3	0	4	0	0	0	1+1	0
18	DF	(England) ENG	Liam Chilvers	40	2	33+1	2	2+1	0	1	0	2	0
19	DF	(England) ENG	Garry Richards	19	0	12+3	0	1	0	0	0	3	0
21	MF	(England) ENG	Robbie King	5	0	0+3	0	0	0	0	0	2	0
25	DF	(England) ENG	Sam Stockley	35	1	21+6	1	2+1	0	1	0	4	0
26	FW	(England) ENG	Tony Thorpe	14	0	5+9	0	0	0	0	0	0	0
28	MF	(Australia) AUS	Richard Garcia	30	8	9+13	5	3+1	1	0	0	4	2
Players who appeared for Colchester who left during the season
14	FW	(Republic of Ireland) IRL	Mark Yeates	52	6	42+2	5	5	1	1	0	1+1	0
20	MF	(England) ENG	Dean Howell	5	0	1+3	0	0	0	0+1	0	0	0
20	FW	(England) ENG	Scott Vernon	7	1	4+3	1	0	0	0	0	0	0
24	FW	(Jamaica) JAM	Jamal Campbell-Ryce	4	0	1+3	0	0	0	0	0	0	0
24	FW	(England) ENG	Jamie Cureton	10	7	7+1	4	2	3	0	0	0	0
31	FW	(Republic of Ireland) IRL	Billy Clarke	6	0	2+4	0	0	0	0	0	0	0

=== Goalscorers ===
Place	Number	Nationality	Position	Name	League One	FA Cup	League Cup	Football League Trophy	Total
1	11	(Scotland)	FW	Chris Iwelumo	17	2	0	0	19
2	4	(Guyana)	MF	Neil Danns	8	5	0	3	16
3	2	(England)	FB/MF	Greg Halford	7	1	0	0	8
3	28	(Australia)	MF	Richard Garcia	5	1	0	2	8
5	24	(England)	FW	Jamie Cureton	4	3	0	0	7
6	14	(Republic of Ireland)	WG	Mark Yeates	5	1	0	0	6
7	5	(England)	CB	Wayne Brown	2	1	0	0	3
8	8	(Wales)	FW	Gareth Williams	1	1	0	0	2
8	16	(Cameroon)	FB/CB	George Elokobi	1	0	0	1	2
8	18	(England)	CB	Liam Chilvers	2	0	0	0	2
11	6	(England)	MF	Kevin Watson	0	1	0	0	1
11	7	(England)	MF	Karl Duguid	0	0	0	1	1
11	20	(England)	FW	Scott Vernon	1	0	0	0	1
11	25	(England)	FB	Sam Stockley	1	0	0	0	1
				Own goals	4	1	0	0	5
				TOTALS	58	17	0	7	82

=== Disciplinary record ===
Number	Nationality	Position	Name	League One		FA Cup		League Cup		Football League Trophy		Total	
Number	Nationality	Position	Name	Booked	Sent off (straight red)	Booked	Sent off (straight red)	Booked	Sent off (straight red)	Booked	Sent off (straight red)	Booked	Sent off (straight red)
14	(Republic of Ireland)	WG	Mark Yeates	7	0	1	0	0	0	0	0	8	0
18	(England)	CB	Liam Chilvers	7	0	1	0	0	0	0	0	8	0
4	(Guyana)	MF	Neil Danns	5	0	1	0	0	0	1	0	7	0
5	(England)	CB	Wayne Brown	4	1	0	0	0	0	0	0	4	1
2	(England)	FB/MF	Greg Halford	5	0	1	0	0	0	0	0	6	0
10	(England)	MF	Kemal Izzet	3	1	0	0	0	0	0	0	3	1
19	(England)	CB	Garry Richards	2	1	0	0	0	0	0	0	2	1
25	(England)	FB	Sam Stockley	2	0	1	0	0	0	1	0	4	0
1	(Northern Ireland)	GK	Aidan Davison	0	1	0	0	0	0	0	0	0	1
6	(England)	MF	Kevin Watson	3	0	0	0	0	0	0	0	3	0
7	(England)	MF	Karl Duguid	3	0	0	0	0	0	0	0	3	0
12	(England)	CB	Pat Baldwin	3	0	0	0	0	0	0	0	3	0
16	(Cameroon)	FB/CB	George Elokobi	3	0	0	0	0	0	0	0	3	0
11	(Scotland)	FW	Chris Iwelumo	2	0	0	0	0	0	0	0	2	0
17	(England)	FB	John White	2	0	0	0	0	0	0	0	2	0
20	(England)	MF	Dean Howell	1	0	0	0	0	0	0	0	1	0
24	(Jamaica)	WG	Jamal Campbell-Ryce	1	0	0	0	0	0	0	0	1	0
26	(England)	FW	Tony Thorpe	1	0	0	0	0	0	0	0	1	0
28	(Australia)	MF	Richard Garcia	1	0	0	0	0	0	0	0	1	0
31	(Republic of Ireland)	FW	Billy Clarke	1	0	0	0	0	0	0	0	1	0
			TOTALS	56	4	5	0	0	0	2	0	63	4

=== Clean sheets ===
Number of games goalkeepers kept a clean sheet.

Place	Number	Nationality	Player	League One	FA Cup	League Cup	Football League Trophy	Total
1	1	(Northern Ireland)	Aidan Davison	16	0	0	0	16
2	13	(England)	Dean Gerken	3	0	0	1	4
			TOTALS	19	0	0	1	20

=== Player debuts ===
Players making their first-team Colchester United debut in a fully competitive match.

Number	Position	Nationality	Player	Date	Opponent	Ground	Notes
11	FW	(Scotland)	Chris Iwelumo	6 August 2005	Gillingham	Priestfield Stadium	
14	FW	(Republic of Ireland)	Mark Yeates	6 August 2005	Gillingham	Priestfield Stadium	
20	MF	(England)	Dean Howell	9 August 2005	Swansea City	Layer Road	
16	FB/CB	(Cameroon)	George Elokobi	24 August 2005	Cardiff City	Layer Road	
19	CB	(England)	Garry Richards	3 September 2005	Bristol City	Ashton Gate Stadium	
21	MF	(England)	Robbie King	3 September 2005	Bristol City	Ashton Gate Stadium	
24	FW	(England)	Jamie Cureton	22 October 2005	Tranmere Rovers	Prenton Park	
26	FW	(England)	Tony Thorpe	17 January 2006	Bristol City	Layer Road	
20	FW	(England)	Scott Vernon	21 March 2006	Doncaster Rovers	Belle Vue	
31	FW	(Republic of Ireland)	Billy Clarke	25 March 2006	Scunthorpe United	Glanford Park	
24	WG	(Jamaica)	Jamal Campbell-Ryce	4 April 2006	Nottingham Forest	City Ground	

== See also ==
- List of Colchester United F.C. seasons
