= Greg Halford =

English footballer (born 1984)

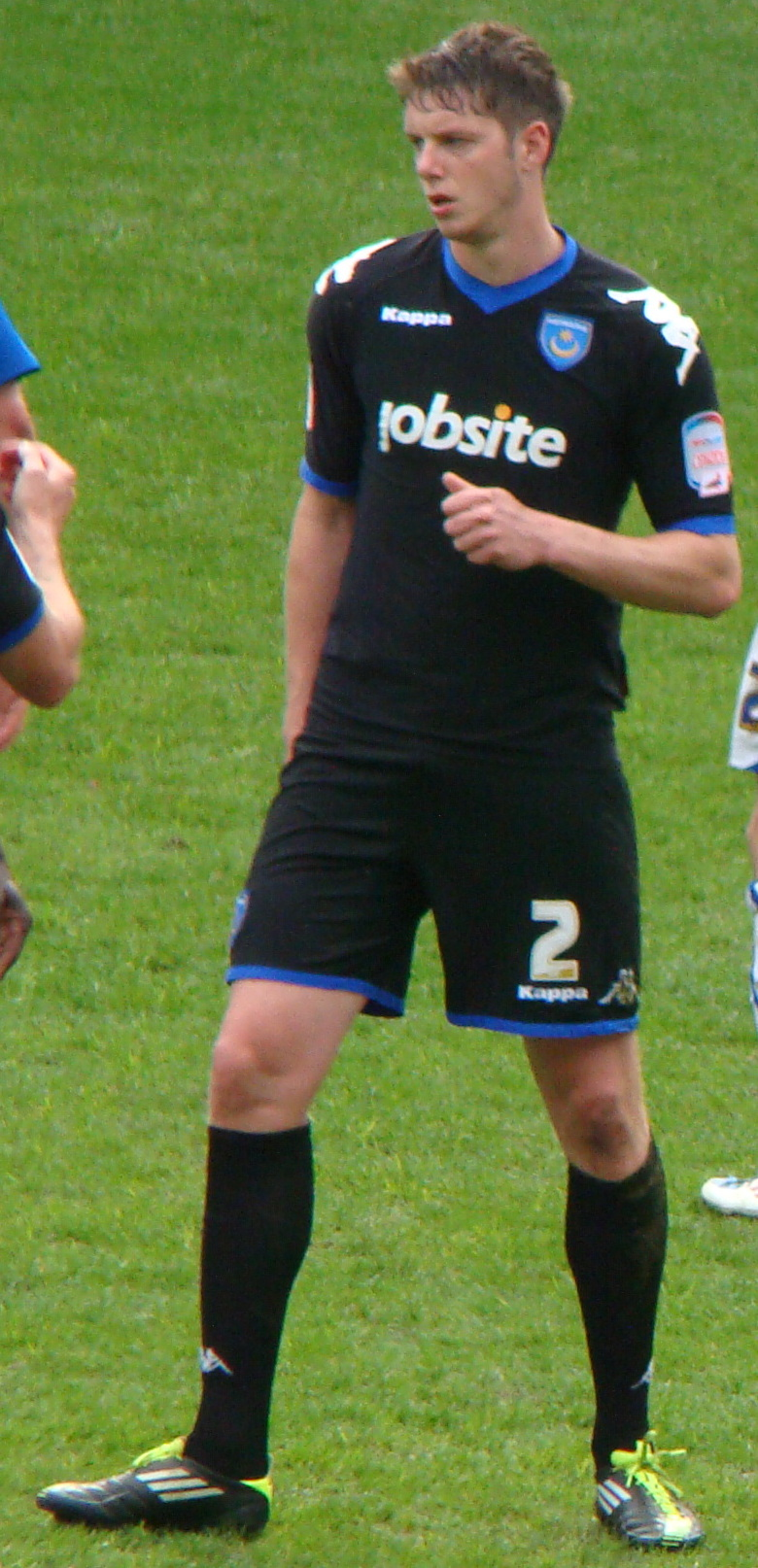
- Halford before a Portsmouth match in May 2011

Personal information
- Full name: Gregory Halford
- Date of birth: 8 December 1984 (age 41)
- Place of birth: Chelmsford, England
- Height: 6 ft 4 in (1.93 m)
- Position: Defender

Youth career
- 2001–2002: Colchester United

Senior career*
Years	Team	Apps	(Gls)
2002–2007	Colchester United	136	(18)
2003	→ Braintree Town (loan)		
2003	→ Aylesbury United (loan)		
2007	Reading	3	(0)
2007–2009	Sunderland	8	(0)
2008	→ Charlton Athletic (loan)	16	(2)
2008–2009	→ Sheffield United (loan)	41	(4)
2009–2011	Wolverhampton Wanderers	17	(0)
2010–2011	→ Portsmouth (loan)	33	(5)
2011–2012	Portsmouth	42	(7)
2012–2015	Nottingham Forest	73	(7)
2014–2015	→ Brighton & Hove Albion (loan)	19	(0)
2015–2017	Rotherham United	35	(2)
2015–2016	→ Birmingham City (loan)	3	(0)
2017–2018	Cardiff City	28	(0)
2019	Aberdeen	2	(0)
2020–2021	Southend United	16	(1)
2021	Waterford	12	(1)
2022	Billericay Town	14	(2)
2022–2024	Hashtag United	52	(12)
2024	Bishop's Stortford	3	(0)
2024–2025	Blyth Spartans	14	(0)
2025	→ Bishop Auckland (loan)	10	(0)
Total		577	(61)

International career
2005	England U20	4	(1)
- * Club domestic league appearances and goals

Gregory Halford (born 8 December 1984) is an English former footballer. He was naturally a right-back or centre-back but could play in numerous positions including central midfield, right midfield and even as a striker.

Born in Chelmsford, Halford began his career with Colchester United where he came through the youth system before moving to Reading in 2007. His stay at Reading was a short one and Halford transferred to Sunderland later the same year. After failing to hold down a regular place with Sunderland, he moved to Wolverhampton Wanderers in 2009 and later to Portsmouth in 2010, Nottingham Forest in 2012, and Rotherham United in 2015. He signed for Cardiff City in January 2017, where he went on to achieve promotion to the Premier League the following season by finishing second in the Championship. Halford has also played for Charlton Athletic, Sheffield United, Brighton & Hove Albion and Birmingham City on loan at various points in his career, as well as representing England at under-20 level.

== Club career ==
=== Colchester United ===
Halford was born in Chelmsford, Essex. He started his football career in July 2001 when he joined Colchester United's youth team. He signed a professional contract on 1 August 2002, made his first-team debut in a 5–0 home defeat to Luton Town on 21 April 2003, and scored his first senior goal in a 2–1 defeat at home to Hartlepool United in March 2004. In the second half of the 2002–03 season, he spent time on loan at Braintree Town and Aylesbury United.

Halford continued his progress at Colchester: he picked up the club's Young Player of the Year award for the 2004–05 season, and was named in the Professional Footballers' Association's 2005–06 League One Team of the Year as Colchester finished as runners-up in League One and gained promotion to the Championship.

In over 150 games in five years for the Layer Road first team, he gained the reputation of being a utility man, having played in defence, midfield and attack for club and country. His last manager, Geraint Williams, preferred to play him at right back. He also had a reputation for a long throw, with a high percentage of Colchester's goals in the 2005–06 season coming from Halford's long throw. He said "I tried measuring it one time – it was half the pitch, 50 yards."

=== Reading ===
Keen to prove himself at a higher level, Halford handed in a transfer request in August 2006 after interest from several Premier League clubs. According to the player, a "big offer" from Sheffield United was rejected. He was linked with a number of other Premier League clubs, but on 30 January 2007, Reading completed the signing of Halford for an undisclosed fee, believed to be in excess of the club's previous record of £2.25 million, on a contract that would keep him at Reading until June 2010. His debut for Reading came as a substitute appearance in their 0–0 home draw with Portsmouth on 17 March 2007, where he played for the last few minutes on the left wing. He made his full debut in Reading's 1–0 defeat away to Tottenham Hotspur on 1 April 2007, where he conceded a penalty in a controversial handball decision. Halford failed to establish himself at Reading, and played only once more. Director of Football Nicky Hammond said that although Halford had not made the impact desired by both club and player, that was no reflection on him personally or professionally, and that "sometimes in football, players do move on quite quickly if it's felt that the fit isn't quite right".

=== Sunderland ===
Halford signed a four-year contract with Premier League club Sunderland on 11 June 2007. The fee was variously reported as £2.5 million rising to £3m depending on appearances, or as £3.5m. Hammond said it was an excellent deal for Reading financially, and Sunderland manager Roy Keane was "delighted" that Halford had joined.

He made his debut for Sunderland on 15 August 2007 in a 2–2 draw with Birmingham City at St Andrew's, and played in the next three matches, but was sent off in the third, a 3–0 League Cup defeat to Luton Town. He made three more appearances, and was again sent off. In January 2008, following reported interest in him from Crystal Palace and Charlton Athletic, Keane confirmed that Sunderland would listen to offers. He was not sold, but instead joined Charlton on loan for the rest of the season. He played regularly in the Championship, and scored twice, against West Bromwich Albion and Wolverhampton Wanderers.

Halford spent the 2008–09 season on loan to Championship club Sheffield United. He made his debut in the opening game of the season, at Birmingham City, scored his first goal a fortnight later, against Blackpool, and went on to play regularly throughout the season, appearing in 49 of the club's 56 fixtures. He scored eight goals altogether, including the only goal of the semi-final against Preston North End that took Sheffield United through to the 2008–09 play-off final.

=== Wolverhampton Wanderers ===
Halford signed for newly promoted Premier League side Wolverhampton Wanderers on 3 July 2009 in a three-year deal for an undisclosed fee. He made his debut on 15 August against West Ham United, and went on to make 17 Premier League appearances for Wolves, along with 3 in cup competitions. He mostly played on the right of midfield or at right back. As with earlier in his career, long throw-ins were a strong feature of his game.

=== Portsmouth ===
Unable to stake a claim to regular football at Molineux, Halford joined Championship club Portsmouth in October 2010 on a month's loan. He made his debut in a victory over Millwall, and his first goal, on 23 October, secured a 2–1 win at Hull City. On 17 November, the loan was extended for a further month, then until January, and then to the end of the season. He was used mostly as a centre back in 2011, with fellow loanee Ritchie De Laet preferred at right back.

On 11 July 2011, Halford signed a three-year contract with Portsmouth. The fee, officially undisclosed, was believed by The News to be in the region of £1m. He finished the season with seven goals, which made him the club's second highest scorer, behind only David Norris with eight. Portsmouth were unable to avoid relegation.

=== Nottingham Forest ===
With the club on the brink of closure unless they removed senior players from the wage bill, Portsmouth sold Halford to Championship club Nottingham Forest on 27 July 2012 for an undisclosed fee. He made his debut on 13 August in the League Cup against Fleetwood Town, made his league debut five days later against Bristol City, and scored his first Forest goal in the 4–1 win over Barnsley in October, in a performance that earned him a place in that week's Football League Championship Team of the Week.

After the 3–0 home win over Bolton Wanderers in August 2013, in which Halford was deployed as a striker, manager Billy Davies said he now regarded him "predominantly as a front man". Halford appeared regularly for Forest during that season, but not at all the next. He spent time on loan to Brighton & Hove Albion during 2014–15 before being released when his contract expired in June 2015.

=== Rotherham United ===
In July 2015, Halford joined Rotherham United on a free transfer. He was appointed captain, but after only five league games – four losses and a draw – manager Steve Evans replaced him with Lee Frecklington. Halford played only once more before joining fellow Championship club Birmingham City on 26 November 2015, on loan until 2 January 2016. He made his Birmingham debut as a late substitute in a goalless draw at Middlesbrough on 12 December, and after two more appearances off the bench, he returned to Rotherham when his loan expired.

=== Cardiff City ===
On 6 January 2017, Halford joined Cardiff City, signing an 18-month contract, making his debut two days later in a 2–1 defeat to Fulham in the third round of the FA Cup. He scored his first goal for Cardiff in a 2–1 EFL Cup win against former club Portsmouth on 8 August 2017.

At the end of the 2017–18 season, Halford left the club after his contract expired on 30 June.

=== Aberdeen ===
On 26 February 2019, Halford joined Aberdeen until the end of the season. He left at the end of his contract.

=== Southend United ===
Halford signed for Southend United of League Two on a short-term deal on 15 December 2020. Hours later, he made his debut as a substitute against Grimsby Town and scored the final goal in a 3–1 win. On 18 January 2021, Halford signed a contract extension to remain at the club until the end of the 2020–21 season.

=== Waterford ===
On 23 July 2021, it was announced that Halford had signed for League of Ireland Premier Division club Waterford. He made his debut for the club the same day in an FAI Cup tie away to Athlone Town, and scored a 91st-minute equaliser. The match stood at 4–4 after extra time, and Waterford won on penalties. He made a total of 17 appearances in all competitions for the club, scoring two goals, as they were relegated to the League of Ireland First Division.

=== Billericay Town ===
On 12 February 2022, Halford signed for National League South side Billericay Town.

=== Hashtag United ===
On 27 August 2022, Isthmian League North Division side Hashtag United announced the signing of Halford on 27 August 2022. He made his debut the same day in an Isthmian League game at home to Stowmarket Town, scoring an opening own goal before his quick free kick led to a late equaliser. On 15 April 2023, Halford scored a penalty in a 6-0 win against Great Wakering Rovers which saw Hashtag United clinch the Isthmian League North Division title, and secure promotion to the Isthmian League Premier Division.

=== Blyth Spartans ===
On 6 September 2024, Northern Premier League side Blyth Spartans announced the signing of Halford.

On 7 February 2025, Halford joined Northern Premier League Division One East side Bishop Auckland on loan for the remainder of the season.

Halford announced his retirement from football on 9 September 2025.

== International career ==
Halford was capped for England at U20 level. He made his debut against Portugal in the Toulon Tournament on 4 June 2005, and scored his first international goal in a 3–0 win against South Korea two days later.

== Style of play ==
Halford was praised for his versatility, to the extent that he was referred to as a utility player.

During his time at Colchester, he played primarily on the right-hand side of midfield, though appeared in the centre of midfield, as a right-back, and a forward, where he scored six goals in nine games. While at Forest, the Nottingham Post stated that during the 2012–13 season, Halford "played in every position on the pitch for Forest, asides from actually taking the keeper's gloves", going on to add that he did "not look out of place" as either a full back or "even in wide positions in midfield", with manager Billy Davies also installing Halford as a striker. Upon signing for Cardiff in 2017, manager Neil Warnock, who had managed Halford at Rotherham, commented that "he played five or six positions" in the previous season.

== Personal life ==
In 2023 Halford became one of the first professional footballers to reveal that he is autistic; he also revealed that he had been subjected to discrimination throughout his career due to his perceived failure to 'fit in' with teammates, notably at Reading and by Roy Keane at Sunderland.

== Career statistics ==
Appearances and goals by club, season and competition
Club	Season	League			National Cup (Note: Includes FA Cup, Scottish Cup and FAI Cup)		League Cup (Note: Includes Football League Cup/EFL Cup, Scottish League Cup and League of Ireland Cup)		Other		Total	
Club	Season	Division	Apps	Goals	Apps	Goals	Apps	Goals	Apps	Goals	Apps	Goals
Colchester United	2002–03	Second Division	1	0	0	0	0	0	0	0	1	0
Colchester United	2003–04	Second Division	18	4	2	0	0	0	4 (Note: Appearances in Football League Trophy)	0	24	4
Colchester United	2004–05	League One	44	4	5	4	3	1	1	0	53	9
Colchester United	2005–06	League One	45	7	5	1	1	0	4	0	55	8
Colchester United	2006–07	Championship	28	3	1	0	1	0	—		30	3
Colchester United	Total		136	18	13	5	5	1	9	0	163	24
Reading	2006–07	Premier League	3	0	0	0	0	0	—		3	0
Sunderland	2007–08	Premier League	8	0	0	0	1	0	—		9	0
Charlton Athletic (loan)	2007–08	Championship	16	2	0	0	0	0	—		16	2
Sheffield United (loan)	2008–09	Championship	41	4	4	3	1	0	3 (Note: Appearances in Championship play-offs)	1	49	8
Wolverhampton Wanderers	2009–10	Premier League	15	0	1	0	0	0	—		16	0
Wolverhampton Wanderers	2010–11	Premier League	2	0	0	0	2	0	—		4	0
Wolverhampton Wanderers	Total		17	0	1	0	2	0	—		20	0
Portsmouth (loan)	2010–11	Championship	33	5	—		—		—		33	5
Portsmouth	2011–12	Championship	42	7	1	0	1	0	—		44	7
Portsmouth	Total		75	12	1	0	1	0	—		77	12
Nottingham Forest	2012–13	Championship	37	3	1	0	2	0	—		40	3
Nottingham Forest	2013–14	Championship	36	4	4	0	2	1	—		42	5
Nottingham Forest	2014–15	Championship	0	0	0	0	0	0	—		0	0
Nottingham Forest	Total		73	7	5	0	4	1	—		82	8
Brighton & Hove Albion (loan)	2014–15	Championship	19	0	1	0	0	0	—		20	0
Rotherham United	2015–16	Championship	21	2	0	0	2	0	—		23	2
Rotherham United	2016–17	Championship	14	0	0	0	1	1	—		15	1
Rotherham United	Total		35	2	0	0	3	1	—		38	3
Birmingham City (loan)	2015–16	Championship	3	0	—		—		—		3	0
Cardiff City	2016–17	Championship	16	0	1	0	0	0	—		17	0
Cardiff City	2017–18	Championship	12	0	2	0	2	1	—		16	1
Cardiff City	Total		28	0	3	0	2	1	—		33	1
Aberdeen	2018–19	Scottish Premiership	2	0	0	0	0	0	0	0	2	0
Southend United	2020–21	League Two	16	1	0	0	0	0	0	0	16	1
Waterford	2021	League of Ireland Premier Division	12	1	4	1	—		1 (Note: Appearances in 2021 League of Ireland promotion/relegation playoffs)	0	17	2
Billericay Town	2021–22	National League South	14	2	0	0	—		0	0	14	2
Hashtag United	2022–23	Isthmian League North Division	32	8	1	0	—		3 (Note: One appearance each in FA Trophy and Essex Senior Cup, one appearance and one goal in Alan Turvey Trophy)	1	36	9
Hashtag United	2023–24	Isthmian League Premier Division	20	4	1	0	—		5 (Note: One appearance in FA Trophy, four appearances in Alan Turvey Trophy)	0	26	4
Hashtag United	Total		52	12	2	0	0	0	8	1	62	13
Bishop's Stortford	2024–25	Southern League Premier Division Central	3	0	0	0	—		0	0	3	0
Blyth Spartans	2024–25	Northern Premier League Premier Division	14	0	1	0	—		1 (Note: Appearance(s) in FA Trophy)	0	16	0
Bishop Auckland (loan)	2024–25	Northern Premier League East Division	10	0	0	0	—		0	0	10	0
Career total			577	61	35	9	19	4	22	2	653	76

== Honours ==
Cardiff City

- EFL Championship runner-up: 2017–18

Hashtag United

- Isthmian League North Division: 2022-23

Individual

- PFA Team of the Year: 2005–06 League One
