= Stephen Hunt (footballer, born 1984) =

English footballer

Personal information
- Full name: Stephen James Hunt
- Date of birth: 11 November 1984 (age 41)
- Place of birth: Southampton, England
- Height: 6 ft 1 in (1.85 m)
- Position: Defender

Youth career
- –2004: Southampton

Senior career*
Years	Team	Apps	(Gls)
2004–2006	Colchester United	22	(1)
2006–2012	Notts County	117	(4)
2011	→ Lincoln City (loan)	14	(2)
Total		153	(7)
- * Club domestic league appearances and goals

Stephen James Hunt (born 11 November 1984) is an English retired footballer. He played as a defender.

== Early life ==
He was born in Southampton. Hunt started his career as a trainee at his hometown club.

== Football career ==
After 10 years at the club, he left for Colchester United before making a first team appearance. The start of his Colchester career came when he was sent off 59 seconds into his debut against Chesterfield. He scored his first and only goal for Colchester in a 5–0 win over Walsall. He didn't appear often in Colchester's 2005–06 promotion run-in, making only two substitute appearances, but started three games in the cups. As a result, he was sold to Notts County in June 2006.

After a turbulent start that saw him nearly leave the club before playing a game, he became team captain. On 5 February 2007 Hunt signed a 2 1/2-year contract to keep him at Meadow Lane until June 2009.

The 2009–2010 season was his best with goals against Forest Green and Wigan Athletic in an impressive F.A cup run for the magpies. That ended in the 5th round against Fulham. After playing 39 games he was part of the defensive unit that kept a club record number 26 clean sheets. Hunt was an integral part of the title winning team in the 2009–2010 season.

In May 2012 he was released by the club, along with 12 other players.

== Career statistics ==
Appearances and goals by club, season and competition
Club	Season	Division	League		FA Cup		League Cup		Other		Total	
Club	Season	Division	Apps	Goals	Apps	Goals	Apps	Goals	Apps	Goals	Apps	Goals
Colchester United	2004–05	League One	20	1	2	0	2	0	1 (Note: Appearance(s) in Football League Trophy)	0	25	1
Colchester United	2005–06	League One	2	0	0	0	0	0	0	0	2	0
Colchester United	Total		22	1	2	0	2	0	1	0	27	1
Notts County	2006–07	League Two	33	1	0	0	2	0	1	0	36	1
Notts County	2007–08	League Two	37	2	1	0	1	0	1	0	40	2
Notts County	2008–09	League Two	11	0	2	0	0	0	0	0	13	0
Notts County	2009–10	League Two	32	1	5	2	1	0	0	0	38	3
Notts County	2010–11	League One	4	0	3	0	2	0	0	0	9	0
Notts County	2011–12	League One	0	0	0	0	0	0	0	0	0	0
Notts County	Total		117	4	11	2	6	0	2	0	136	4
Lincoln City (loan)	2010–11	League Two	14	2	0	0	0	0	0	0	14	2
Career total			153	7	13	2	8	0	3	0	177	9

== Honours ==
Notts County

- Football League Two: 2009–10
