= Richard Garcia =

Australian soccer player (born 1981)

Richard García
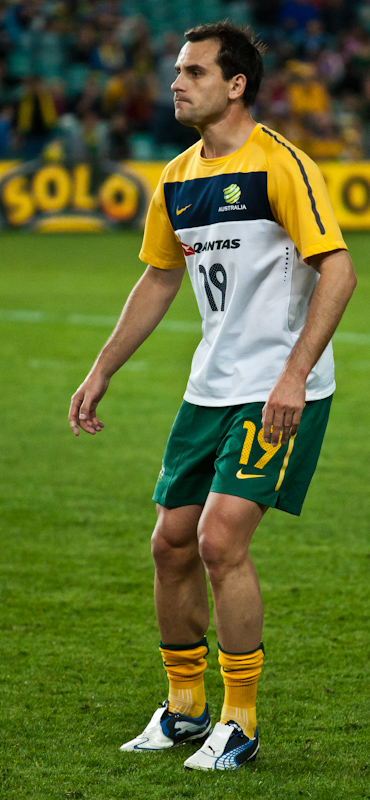
- Garcia with Australia

Personal information
- Full name: Richard Garcia
- Date of birth: 4 September 1981 (age 45)
- Place of birth: Perth, Western Australia, Australia
- Height: 1.80 m (5 ft 11 in)
- Positions: Winger; striker; attacking midfielder

Youth career
- Olympic Kingsway
- 1997–1999: West Ham United

Senior career*
Years	Team	Apps	(Gls)
1999–2004	West Ham United	16	(0)
2000	→ Leyton Orient (loan)	18	(4)
2004–2007	Colchester United	82	(16)
2007–2012	Hull City	114	(8)
2012–2013	Melbourne City	24	(6)
2013–2014	Sydney FC	23	(6)
2014	Minnesota United FC	2	(0)
2014–2017	Perth Glory	58	(5)
Total		337	(45)

International career
2003	Australia U23	2	(0)
2008–2012	Australia	17	(2)

Managerial career
- 2018–2020: Perth Glory (assistant)
- 2018–2020: Perth Glory Youth
- 2020–2022: Perth Glory
- 2022–: Australia U23 (assistant)
- * Club domestic league appearances and goals

Richard Garcia (born 4 September 1981) is an Australian soccer manager and former player. He is currently an assistant coach for Australia's U23 team, having previously managed A-League Men's side Perth Glory.

As a player, Garcia played for West Ham United, Leyton Orient, Colchester United, Hull City, Melbourne City, Sydney FC, Minnesota United, Perth Glory and internationally for Australia.

== Club career ==
=== West Ham United ===
Born in Perth, Garcia was a product of the West Ham United youth academy, moving from Australia to England to join the Hammers at the age of 15 after being spotted by a scout who had initially gone to watch his brother. He signed a professional contract with West Ham in September 1998. He was a key member of the team that won the FA Youth Cup and FA Premier Youth League double in 1998–99, scoring in every round of West Ham's run to the Youth Cup Final, eight in total. He went out on loan to local side Leyton Orient in August 2000, making 21 appearances in League and Cup competitions and scoring four goals. Injury to his knee ligaments ended his season and he returned to West Ham in November 2000. He made his first team debut for West Ham in a League Cup match away at Reading in September 2001, but failed to gain a regular place in the team. After West Ham were relegated to the First Division in 2003, Garcia featured a few more times for the first-team, but made only 16 league appearances for the club before moving on to Colchester United in 2004.

=== Colchester United ===
Garcia signed for Colchester United in September 2004 for an undisclosed fee, and made his debut in the same month against Swindon Town. He went on to make 30 appearances in the 2004–05 season, scoring six goals. The following season Garcia played an important part in helping the club to second place in League One and promotion to the Championship, and to the fifth-round of the FA Cup where they were beaten by English champions Chelsea, although Colchester were at one point winning the match after Garcia's cross was put into his own net by Ricardo Carvalho. Garcia's season was cut short by a knee injury in March 2006, which later required surgery. Following the end of the season, Garcia signed a new contract with the club. In August 2006, he scored Colchester's first goal of the 2006–07 season in the Championship on the opening game against Birmingham City, going on to make 36 league appearances, scoring seven goals, as Colchester pushed for a place in the end of season promotion playoff positions. At the end of the season, Garcia had made a total of 96 appearances in all competitions for Colchester United, scoring 21 goals.

=== Hull City ===
Despite the offer of a new deal at Colchester, Garcia signed a three-year contract with Hull City on 2 July 2007, on a free transfer under the Bosman ruling. He made his league debut for Hull against Plymouth Argyle in August 2007 and scored his first goal in the next game in the 3–0 win over Crewe Alexandra. He played a leading role in the club's push for promotion in the 2007–08 season, despite a shoulder injury suffered in April 2008. His goal against Burnley in March 2008, scored from 35-yards out, was voted Hull's goal of the season for 2007–08 Garcia returned to the Premiership after Hull City's promotion play-off victory over Bristol City in May 2008. Garcia started Hull's first top flight game against Fulham on 16 August 2008, and performed well in his favoured right wing position. The following weekend at Ewood Park in a 1–1 draw against Blackburn Rovers, he scored Hull's equaliser with a header in the 39th minute, two minutes after Jason Roberts had given Blackburn the lead.

On 31 July 2009, it was revealed that Garcia had ruptured knee ligaments and would be out for at least three months. On 12 November 2010, he scored his first goal in two seasons, in a 2–0 win against Preston at Deepdale.

On 13 May 2011, Garcia had his one-year contract extension offer withdrawn because he was told he would be out for up to nine months with an injured cruciate ligament.

He made his return from injury in a 1–0 win over Coventry City on 10 December 2011

=== Melbourne Heart ===
Garcia signed a one-year contract with A-League outfit Melbourne Heart FC on 23 August 2012.

=== Sydney FC ===
On 16 August 2013, it was announced that Garcia had signed a 1-year deal with Sydney FC. Garcia made his official debut for Sydney FC in the first game of the 2013–14 season at home to the Newcastle Jets. Sydney won the game 2–0, with Garcia having a late goal disallowed for offside. Garcia scored his first goal for Sydney FC in the Round 5 Big Blue clash against Melbourne Victory, just 2 minutes into the match, after a howler from Victory goalkeeper Nathan Coe.

=== Minnesota United FC ===
Garcia signed a deal with Minnesota United FC on 5 May 2014 for the 2014 Spring Season with an option for the Fall Season. Due to difficulties in obtaining a work visa, Garcia only played two games for Minnesota. He made his debut for the team on 31 May 2014 when he was substituted into the game against Atlanta Silverbacks in the 67th minute.

=== Perth Glory ===
It was announced on 8 July 2014 that Garcia signed a 2-year contract with Perth Glory.

On 12 October, Garcia made his debut for Perth Glory in a 2–1 win against Wellington Phoenix. He was deployed as a left-sided midfielder in a 4–4–2 diamond formation.

For the 2015–16 season, it was announced that Richard would take over as captain from Michael Thwaite after making controversial comments about the team's situation from the season before.

On 14 May 2017, Garcia was released by the Glory, and he announced his retirement from professional football.

In 2018, Garcia took on a position of Perth Glory Assistant Coach for the senior team and head coach for the youth team.

Garcia was appointed Head Coach of Perth Glory in September 2020.

== International career ==
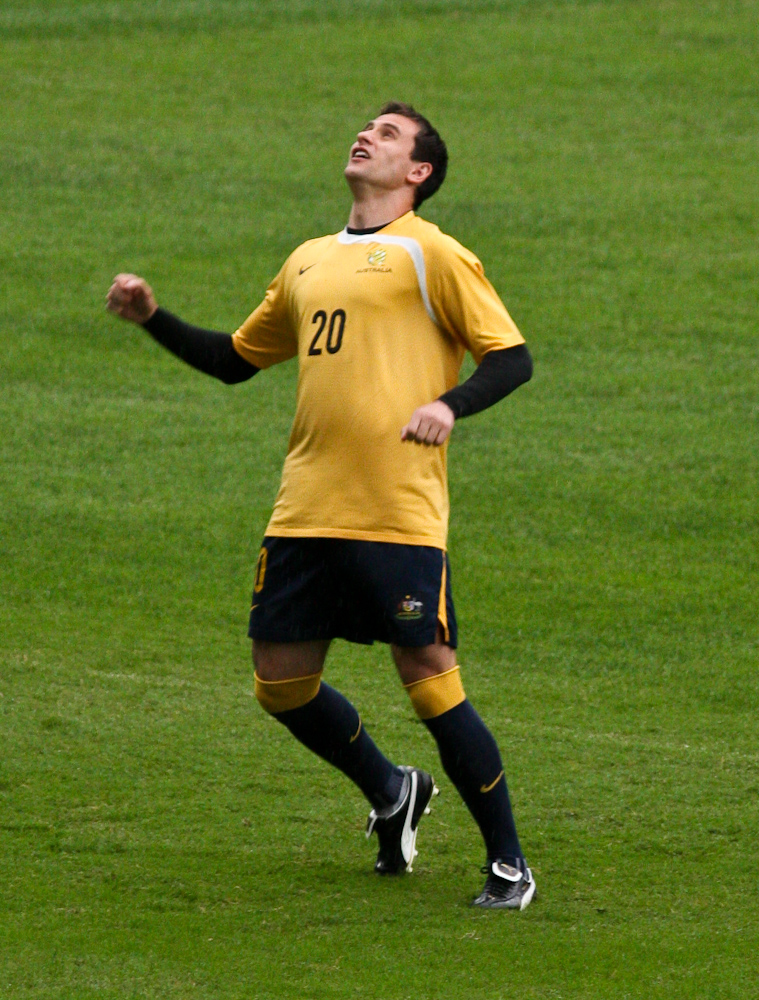
Garcia warming up for Australia

In an interview with Australia's Sun-Herald newspaper in April 2008, Garcia said he had ambitions to play for the Socceroos, Australia's national team, and hoped that his good form for Hull in their push for promotion to the Premier League would help him to achieve this. On 19 August 2008 he received his first senior international cap when he came on as a second-half substitute in the friendly against South Africa at Loftus Road in London. That match ended in a 2–2 draw. His second cap came in a friendly match against the Netherlands, again as a substitute, where the match was won by the Socceroos 2–1. On 13 June 2010, Garcia became the first Hull City player ever to play in the World Cup, by starting as a forward in Australia's 0–4 defeat to Germany in the group stage.

On 7 December 2012, he scored his first ever goal for Australia as they defeated Guam 9–0 in a 2013 EAFF East Asian Cup game.

== Personal life ==
García speaks fluent Spanish since his parents are from Uruguay. He became close friends with Michael Carrick during their time at West Ham, and they were ushers at each other's weddings.

== Career statistics ==
=== Club ===
Appearances and goals by club, season and competition
Club	Season	League			National cup		League cup		Other		Total	
Club	Season	Division	Apps	Goals	Apps	Goals	Apps	Goals	Apps	Goals	Apps	Goals
Leyton Orient (loan)	2000–01	League Two	18	4	0	0	3	0	0	0	21	4
West Ham United	2001–02	Premier League	8	0	0	0	1	0	0	0	9	0
West Ham United	2002–03	Premier League	0	0	1	0	1	0	0	0	2	0
West Ham United	2003–04	Championship	7	0	0	0	3	0	0	0	10	0
West Ham United	2004–05	Championship	1	0	0	0	0	0	0	0	1	0
West Ham United	Total		16	0	1	0	5	0	0	0	22	0
Colchester United	2004–05	League One	24	4	3	1	2	0	1 (Note: Appearance(s) in Football League Trophy)	1	30	6
Colchester United	2005–06	League One	22	5	5	1	0	0	4	2	31	8
Colchester United	2006–07	Championship	36	7	1	0	1	0	0	0	38	7
Colchester United	Total		82	16	9	2	3	0	5	3	94	17
Hull City	2007–08	Championship	38	5	1	0	2	1	3 (Note: Appearance(s) in Championship play-offs)	1	44	7
Hull City	2008–09	Premier League	23	1	4	0	0	0	0	0	27	1
Hull City	2009–10	Premier League	18	0	1	0	0	0	0	0	19	0
Hull City	2010–11	Championship	25	2	0	0	1	0	0	0	26	2
Hull City	2011–12	Championship	10	0	2	0	0	0	0	0	12	0
Hull City	Total		114	8	8	0	3	1	3	1	128	10
Melbourne Heart	2012–13	A-League	24	6							24	6
Sydney FC	2013–14	A-League	23	6							23	6
Minnesota United FC	2014	NASL	2	0							2	0
Perth Glory	2014–15	A-League										
Career total			280	40	18	2	14	1	8	4	314	43

=== International ===
#	Date	Venue	Opponent	Score	Result	Competition
1.	7 November 2012	Hong Kong Stadium, Hong Kong	Guam	0–9	0–9	2013 EAFF East Asian Cup
2.	9 December 2012	Hong Kong Stadium, Hong Kong	Chinese Taipei	1–0	8–0	2013 EAFF East Asian Cup

== Managerial statistics ==
As of 18 May 2022

Team	Nat	From	To	Record				
Team	Nat	From	To	G	W	D	L	Win %
Perth Glory	(Australia)	September 2020	March 2022	48	12	12	24	25.00
Total				48	12	12	24	25.00

== Honours ==
Colchester United

- Football League One second-place promotion: 2005–06

Hull City

- Football League Championship play-offs: 2008

Minnesota United

- NASL Spring Season Champions: 2014
