= Wayne Andrews (footballer) =

English footballer (born 1977)

Personal information
- Full name: Wayne Michael Hill Andrews
- Date of birth: 25 November 1977 (age 48)
- Place of birth: Paddington, London, England
- Height: 1.78 m (5 ft 10 in)
- Position: Forward

Team information
- Current team: Southend United (fitness coach)

Youth career
- 1994–1996: Watford

Senior career*
Years	Team	Apps	(Gls)
1996–1999	Watford	28	(4)
1998	→ Cambridge United (loan)	2	(0)
1999	→ Peterborough United (loan)	10	(5)
1999–2000	St Albans City		
2000–2001	Aldershot Town		
2001–2002	Chesham United		
2002–2003	Oldham Athletic	36	(11)
2003–2004	Colchester United	46	(14)
2004–2006	Crystal Palace	33	(1)
2006–2008	Coventry City	10	(1)
2006	→ Sheffield Wednesday (loan)	9	(1)
2007	→ Bristol City (loan)	7	(2)
2007	→ Leeds United (loan)	1	(0)
2008	→ Bristol Rovers (loan)	1	(0)
2008–2009	Luton Town	7	(0)
2025	Wealdstone	0	(0)
Total		190	(39)
- * Club domestic league appearances and goals

Wayne Michael Hill Andrews (born 25 November 1977) is an English personal trainer and former footballer who played as a forward in the Football League for a number of clubs, most notably for Watford, Oldham Athletic, Colchester United, Crystal Palace (including in the Premier League), Coventry City and Luton Town, and also appeared for several clubs on loan.

As of July 2025, Andrews is the Head of Performance at National League side Southend United after a spell as the Head of Strength and Conditioning at fellow National League outfit Wealdstone from May 2024.

== Career ==
=== Watford ===
Born in Paddington, London, Andrews began his career at Watford, where he made his debut as a substitute in a 2–1 win against AFC Bournemouth on 17 August 1996. He made his first league start 10 days later in a 2–0 defeat to Plymouth Argyle. He scored his first goal for Watford in a 2–0 win over Walsall on 3 September 1996 in a League Cup tie, and scored his first league goal in a 3–2 win over Notts County one week later. His first season ended having scored five goals in 29 appearances in all competitions.

After making two league and two cup appearances for the Hornets in the 1997–98 season, Andrews suffered a broken ankle, leaving him out of action for seven months.

==== Cambridge and Peterborough loans ====
On his return from injury, Andrews was loaned out to both Cambridge United and Peterborough United in the 1998–99 season. He made only two appearances for Cambridge in October 1998, before joining Peterborough in February 1999. He made an immediate impact for the club, scoring four goals in a 5–2 victory over Barnet on his debut. He went on to make ten appearances for Peterborough, scoring only once more during his spell.

=== Non-league ===
Andrews was released from his Watford contract in April 1999 and joined St Albans City for one season, later spending a year at Aldershot Town and then one season with Chesham United.

=== Oldham Athletic ===
In May 2002, Andrews signed for Oldham Athletic on a one-year deal. At Chesham, he played under Bob Dowie, brother of Iain, who was at the time assistant manager at Oldham.

Andrews made his Latics debut on 31 August in a 2–0 defeat to Wycombe Wanderers. He scored his first goal for Oldham on 14 September from the penalty spot in a 6–1 win over Mansfield Town.

Having scored 11 goals in 38 league appearances and with Oldham reaching the play-offs, Andrews was sent off for violent conduct in the second leg of their play-off semi-final defeat against Queens Park Rangers on 14 May 2003. In May 2003, Andrews was released by Oldham, despite having been offered a new contract.

=== Colchester United ===
On 1 July 2003, Andrews joined Colchester United on a two-year contract. He made his home debut in a traditional pre-season friendly with neighbours Ipswich Town, a game which ended 3–0 to Ipswich. He scored on his full debut, coming on as a substitute in a 4–3 away defeat to Port Vale on 23 August.

Andrews started the season brightly, scoring four goals in his first six matches for Colchester, and also scored a goal in five consecutive games between 21 October and 15 November. He scored 14 goals in 50 appearances for Colchester in the 2003–04 season.

=== Crystal Palace ===
On 1 September 2004, immediately before the transfer deadline, Andrews transferred to Premier League side Crystal Palace, who were managed by former Oldham manager Iain Dowie. He signed for a six-figure fee in the region of £100,000, with Gareth Williams joining Colchester in part-exchange.

He made his Palace debut on 11 December 2004, coming on as a 53rd-minute substitute for Aki Riihilahti in a 0–0 draw with Blackburn Rovers. Andrews made nine appearances in his first season with Crystal Palace, failing to score a goal.

Andrews featured more regularly for the team following their relegation from the Premier League, making 31 appearances in all competitions, but scoring only once. In May 2006, Andrews was released from Crystal Palace with a record of one goal scored in 33 league games.

=== Coventry City ===
On 3 June 2006, Andrews signed for Championship rivals Coventry City on a three-year contract. Ironically by joining Coventry City he joined the only team from whom he had scored against whilst playing for Palace. His time with Coventry did not start well after suffering a fractured ankle in a pre-season friendly defeat against Boavista on 30 July. Andrews had scored Coventry's goal in the 2–1 defeat.

Andrews made his debut on 28 October, coming on as a substitute in the 83rd minute and scoring in the 84th, away at Barnsley to win the game 1–0. This was to be his only goal scored for Coventry.

==== Sheffield Wednesday loan ====
After making only three appearances for Coventry, Andrews went out on loan to Sheffield Wednesday on a month-long deal. He made nine appearances for the club, scoring only one goal, his second against Barnsley.

==== Bristol City loan ====
In January 2007, Andrews was loaned to Bristol City for an initial month-long deal. He scored on his debut for Bristol City in a 3–0 win against former club Oldham the following day. He then scored in his next game during a 2–0 Football League Trophy win against Brighton & Hove Albion on 23 January. On 31 January, his loan with Bristol City was extended to the end of the season. He scored one further goal for City against Blackpool in a 1–0 victory on 17 February, bringing his total to three goals in ten matches.

==== Leeds United loan ====
On 1 October 2007, Andrews signed for Leeds United on a one-month loan deal. He was recruited following a string of injuries and suspensions for Jermaine Beckford, Trésor Kandol, Leon Constantine and Tore André Flo. He made two appearances for Leeds, playing once in the league, a 1–0 win over former club Oldham, and a 1–0 win over Darlington in the League Trophy. He failed to impress at Leeds and was returned to Coventry after the expiry of his deal.

==== Bristol Rovers loan ====
In March 2008, Andrews was released at the end of his contract with Coventry City. A few days later, he signed on loan for Bristol Rovers until the end of the season. Andrews lasted just 17 minutes for Bristol Rovers as he was stretchered off with an injury to his knee ligaments.

=== Later career ===
After his release from Coventry, Bristol Rovers had looked to sign Andrews, if he proved his fitness during pre-season. The club set a deadline for him to prove his fitness by the end of July. He had missed some of his rehabilitation from injury as Coventry had already announced he was to be released at the end of his contract with them.

Following his failed trial with Bristol Rovers, Andrews began training with Luton Town and he was offered a contract in October 2008. After ten appearances and no goals for Luton, Andrews was released in January 2009.

Yeovil Town took Andrews on trial in February 2009, but the club did not offer him a contract. He subsequently retired from professional football soon afterwards.

=== Progression into Strength and Conditioning ===
Upon retirement, Andrews began his career as a personal trainer, working most notably with Jermaine Jenas and Andy Cole.

In May 2024, Andrews joined National League club Wealdstone as Head of Strength and Conditioning, replacing the outgoing Rachel Hill.

In January 2025, 47 year old Andrews came on as substitute for Wealdstone in a National League Cup game against Brighton U21.

In July 2025, Andrews announced on Linkedin that he had become the new Head of Performance at Southend United.

== Personal life ==
Born in England, Andrews is of Barbadian descent. His son Ryan Andrews is a professional footballer with Swiss outfit Young Boys.

In October 2022, Andrews opened up on his diagnosis with focal segmental glomerulosclerosis, a form of kidney disease.

== Career statistics ==
Appearances and goals by club, season and competition
Club	Season	League			FA Cup		League Cup		Other^{[A]}		Total	
Club	Season	Division	Apps	Goals	Apps	Goals	Apps	Goals	Apps	Goals	Apps	Goals
Watford	1996–97	Second Division	25	4	1	0	3	1	0	0	29	5
Watford	1997–98	Second Division	2	0	0	0	2	0	0	0	4	0
Watford	1998–99	First Division	0	0	0	0	0	0	0	0	0	0
Watford	Total		27	4	1	0	5	1	0	0	33	5
Cambridge United (loan)	1998–99	Third Division	2	0	0	0	0	0	0	0	2	0
Peterborough United (loan)	1998–99	Third Division	10	5	0	0	0	0	0	0	10	5
Oldham Athletic	2002–03	Second Division	36	11	3	0	3	0	3	1	45	12
Colchester United	2003–04	Second Division	41	12	5	0	0	0	4	2	50	14
Colchester United	2004–05	League One	5	2	0	0	1	0	0	0	6	2
Colchester United	Total		46	14	5	0	1	0	4	2	56	16
Crystal Palace	2004–05	Premier League	9	0	0	0	0	0	0	0	9	0
Crystal Palace	2005–06	Championship	24	1	3	0	4	0	0	0	31	1
Crystal Palace	Total		33	1	3	0	4	0	0	0	40	1
Coventry City	2006–07	Championship	3	1	1	0	0	0	0	0	4	1
Coventry City	2007–08	Championship	7	0	0	0	0	0	0	0	7	0
Coventry City	Total		10	1	1	0	0	0	0	0	11	1
Sheffield Wednesday (loan)	2006–07	Championship	9	1	0	0	0	0	0	0	9	1
Bristol City (loan)	2006–07	League One	7	2	0	0	0	0	3	1	10	3
Leeds United (loan)	2007–08	League One	1	0	0	0	0	0	1	0	2	0
Bristol Rovers (loan)	2007–08	League One	1	0	0	0	0	0	0	0	1	0
Luton Town	2008–09	League Two	7	0	2	0	0	0	1	0	10	0
Wealdstone	2024–25	National League	0	0	0	0	0	0	1	0	1	0
Career total			189	39	15	0	13	1	13	4	230	44

A. The "Other" column constitutes appearances and goals (including those as a substitute) in the Football League play-offs, Football League Trophy and National League Cup.
