= Tcham N'Toya =

French-Congolese footballer (born 1983)

Personal information
- Full name: Tcham N'Toya-Zoa
- Date of birth: 3 November 1983 (age 42)
- Place of birth: Kinshasa, Zaire
- Height: 5 ft 10 in (1.78 m)
- Position: Striker

Team information
- Current team: Maccabi Ahi Nazareth
- Number: 19

Senior career*
Years	Team	Apps	(Gls)
2003–2004	Troyes AC	3	(0)
2004–2006	Chesterfield	48	(8)
2006	→ York City (loan)	3	(0)
2006	→ Oxford United (loan)	8	(4)
2006–2007	Notts County	21	(1)
2007–2008	Maccabi Herzliya	21	(2)
2008–	Maccabi Ahi Nazareth	43	(10)
- * Club domestic league appearances and goals as of 16:05, 2 Feb 2009 (UTC)

Tcham N'Toya-Zoa (born 3 November 1983) is a French-Congolese footballer. He has spent much of his career in the English football leagues, playing primarily in attack, and he is currently playing in Israel for Maccabi Herzliya. His name in Hebrew is נטויה צ'אם. In Arabic it is تشام(هشام) نطويا.

== Career ==
Although born in Zaire, N'Toya got his start in football playing in the youth team of French Ligue 1 club Troyes AC. He soon relocated as English club Chesterfield signed the young striker.

At Chesterfield, N'Toya played 48 games and scored 8 goals, before the club loaned him out in 2006; first to York City and then Oxford United, the latter of which he had an impressive record, scoring 4 goals in 8 games.

He was signed by Notts County in the summer of 2006 on a free transfer. Upon signing him, County manager Steve Thompson tipped N'Toya to shine stating; "He is an untapped talent and there is more to come from Tcham. He has outstanding pace and strength and is also a willing learner which is the main thing." N'Toya was released by Notts County at the end of the 2006–07 season on 8 May 2007. Despite scoring the winner in a League Cup match against Premier League side Middlesbrough, he only scored one league goal, coming against Bury.

He went on trial at Scottish Premier League side St Mirren in August, but failed to win a contract. He later joined the Israeli Premier League side Maccabi Herzliya and now he plays for Maccabi Ahi Nazareth.

Tcham N'toya now coaches the senior team at Fc Aubinois, a Regional 3 team in the Brittany League, France.
