= Paul Taylor (referee) =

English football referee

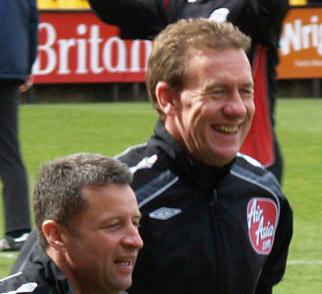
- Full name: Paul Taylor
- Born: 20 June 1959 (age 67); Enfield, Middlesex, England

Domestic
Years	League	Role
? - ?	Herts. County League	Referee
? - ?	Isthmian League	Referee
? -1990	Panel League Comps.	Referee
1986-1990	Football League	Asst. referee
1990-1993	Football League	Referee
1995-2000	Football League	Referee
2000-2001	Premier League	Referee
2001-2010	Football League	Referee

Paul Taylor (born 20 June 1959 in Enfield, Middlesex) is a former English football referee, who also took charge of Premier League matches in 2000-2001 before reverting to the Football League. He also officiated in UEFA and FIFA competitions. He subsequently re-located to Hertfordshire.

== Career ==
He first began refereeing in 1977 and progressed via the Hertfordshire County League, the Isthmian League and the Panel League Competitions.

He was appointed as a Football League assistant referee in 1986 and promoted to referee in 1990. At this point he was aged only thirty and the youngest member on the List. The majority of his appointments over the next three seasons were in the lower divisions.

Taylor refereed the Hertfordshire Senior County Cup Final, the FA Sunday Cup Final and several international matches at both Youth and semi-professional level. He also officiated in the Football League play-offs on six occasions including the League Two Final at the Millennium Stadium, Cardiff, in 2006.

Other notable appointments included refereeing Cheltenham Town's first game in the Football League and Southampton's last match at The Dell versus Arsenal.

His overseas appointments included the 2000-01 UEFA Champions League third qualifying round fixture between Dynamo Kyiv and Red Star Belgrade. Taylor refereed his first senior FIFA International between Nigeria and Venezuela in August 2003. In 2004, he was fourth official at the FA Trophy Final. In the same year, he retired from international refereeing due to age restrictions. In 2005, he became a County Accredited Referees Instructor and in 2006 qualified as a National Licensed Instructor.

The 2007–08 season was due to be his final one as a League referee before retirement, however after appealing the decision to remove him from the National List of referees because of age, he was included for the 2008-2009 and 2009–2010 seasons. He refereed the Ipswich v Preston match on the opening day of the 2008-2009 Championship season.

His final fixture was the League One match between Wycombe Wanderers and Gillingham on 8 May 2010. He now works as a Referee Coach for the Professional Game Match Officials Ltd.
