= Ben Bowditch =

English footballer (born 1984)

Personal information
- Full name: Benjamin Edward Bowditch
- Date of birth: 19 February 1984 (age 42)
- Place of birth: Harlow, England
- Position: Midfielder

Youth career
- 1995–2001: Tottenham Hotspur

Senior career*
| Years | Team | Apps | (Gls) |
| 2001–2004 | Tottenham Hotspur | 0 | (0) |
| 2004 | Akademisk Boldklub | 9 | (0) |
| 2004–2005 | Colchester United | 6 | (0) |
| 2005–2006 | Barnet | 8 | (0) |
| 2006 | → Yeading (loan) | 6 | (0) |
| 2007–2008 | Cambridge City | 36 | (4) |
| 2008 | St Albans City | 11 | (0) |
| 2009–2011 | Bishop's Stortford | | |
| 2011–2012 | Thurrock | 26 | (3) |
| 2012–2014 | Concord Rangers | | |
| 2012 | → AFC Sudbury (loan) | | |
| 2014– | Potters Bar Town | | |

International career
| 1999–2001 | England U16 | 21 | (0) |
| 2000 | England U17 | 3 | (0) |
| 2001–2003 | England U19 | 7 | (0) |
| 2002–2003 | England U20 | 5 | (0) |
- * Club domestic league appearances and goals as of 28 December 2014

Ben Bowditch is an English footballer who played as a midfielder. A Tottenham Hotspur youth product, he went on to play for Colchester United, Barnet and Cambridge City.

== Career ==
Bowditch started his playing career at Tottenham Hotspur, however due to constant injury they released him from his contract. After his release from Tottenham, Bowditch went to Denmark to play for Akademisk Boldklub in Copenhagen. On returning to England he joined Colchester United but after an injury hit season he was released from his contract. He played for Barnet and left the club after the 2005–06 season. He has represented the England national side at under-16, 17, 19 and 20 levels.

In November 2019, he signed a short-term deal to play for non-league Stowmarket Town, scoring on his club debut in the FA Vase.

== Personal life ==
Bowditch has had a number of injuries during his playing career which hampered him. At the end of his career he started Bows Soccer Academy.

His younger brother Dean, played for Milton Keynes Dons, as a striker.
