= Liam Coleman =

English footballer (born 1986)

Personal information
- Full name: Liam Phillip Coleman
- Date of birth: 11 January 1986 (age 40)
- Place of birth: Colchester, England
- Position: Midfielder

Senior career*
Years	Team	Apps	(Gls)
2004–2005	Colchester United		(0)
2005–2006	Torquay United	18	(1)
2006	→ Forest Green Rovers (loan)	3	(0)
2006–2008	Ebbsfleet United	68	(1)
2007	→ Heybridge Swifts (loan)	5	(1)
2008	Wivenhoe Town	35	(7)
2008–2009	Northwich Victoria		
2009–2010	Heybridge Swifts		
2010	Aveley		
2010–2011	FC Clacton	27	(5)
2011	Margate		(0)
- * Club domestic league appearances and goals

Liam Phillip Coleman (born 11 January 1986) is an English former professional footballer.

== Career ==
Coleman began his career with Colchester United, turning professional in August 2004. He failed to break into the Colchester first team and chose to leave at the end of the 2004–05 season. In July 2005 he joined Torquay United, initially on trial, and made his league debut as a second-half substitute for Darren Garner in a 3–0 defeat away to Mansfield Town on 13 August 2005. He was a regular squad member for the first three months of the season, but lost his place after coming off injured in the first half of the game at home to Northampton Town on 6 December 2005, which turned out to be his final appearance for Torquay.

Coleman joined Forest Green Rovers on loan in January 2006, but left the club at the end of the season. In August 2006 he joined Gravesend & Northfleet, now known as Ebbsfleet United, on a two-year contract. He was released at the end of the 2007–08 season having two successful seasons, one in which Coleman was involved in the FA trophy win at Wembley stadium.

He played for Braintree Town at the start of the 2008–09 season in the Steve Good Testimonial at home to Charlton Athletic.

In December 2008 he signed a short term professional contract for Northwich Victoria. Coleman spent the 2009–10 season at Heybridge Swifts, before joining Aveley prior to the 2010–11 season. His stay was short-lived however, as he joined Clacton on 17 September 2010.

Coleman signed a one-year deal with Margate on 27 July 2011.

In 2012, Coleman took up a director of coaching role in NJ, USA

== Personal life ==
His father, Phil, was a professional player for Millwall, Colchester, Wrexham, and Aldershot. Phil also played for Wivenhoe Town.
