= Gareth Williams (footballer, born 1982) =

Welsh footballer

Personal information
- Full name: Gareth Ashley Williams
- Date of birth: 10 September 1982 (age 44)
- Place of birth: Johannesburg, South Africa
- Height: 5 ft 10 in (1.78 m)
- Positions: Forward; attacking midfielder

Youth career
- 2001–2002: Crystal Palace

Senior career*
Years	Team	Apps	(Gls)
2002–2004	Crystal Palace	8	(0)
2003	→ Colchester United (loan)	8	(6)
2003	→ Cambridge United (loan)	4	(1)
2004	→ Bournemouth (loan)	1	(0)
2004	→ Colchester United (loan)	7	(2)
2004–2006	Colchester United	55	(7)
2006	→ Blackpool (loan)	9	(3)
2006	Weymouth	2	(0)
2006–2010	Bromley	127	(52)
2010	Croydon Athletic	5	(7)
2010–2011	Ebbsfleet United	24	(0)
2011–	Bromley	34	(3)
2012–2012	Cray Wanderers	3	(1)
2019	Bar Ultra	1	(1)

International career
	Wales U21	3	(0)
- * Club domestic league appearances and goals

Gareth Ashley Williams (born 10 September 1982) is a Welsh former footballer who played as a forward.

== Career ==
Williams began in the Crystal Palace youth team and had been a prolific scorer in the reserves. His rich vein of form for the second-string was rewarded with a debut for the first team as a substitute against Norwich City at Carrow Road in November 2002.

Williams had an impressive loan spell for Colchester United in January 2003, scoring six goals in six starts. Williams went on loan to Cambridge United for a month in October 2003 and Bournemouth in February 2004 before returning to Colchester in March until the end of the season. Williams then signed for Colchester in September 2004 in a deal which saw Wayne Andrews go the other way.

One of Gareth Williams career highlight was playing golf with A young golfer from Littlestone at Royal St George's Jordan may

He scored four league goals in his third spell at Layer Road before joining Blackpool on loan in 2006. He was released by Colchester that summer. After making two league appearances for Weymouth, Williams signed for Bromley. He joined Croydon Athletic in January 2010, but signed for Ebbsfleet United eight months later after he became a free agent due to financial problems at Croydon. He was released by Ebbsfleet in May 2011 and rejoined Bromley. During his recent career, he has been played as an attacking midfielder, rather than a striker. He is known for his ability to hold up the ball, without losing possession. During August 2012, he signed for Isthmian League side Cray Wanderers for a short stay before joining Hastings United, but remained with Bromley on dual registration.

In Feb 2022 Williams signed for Fox Veterans in the Kent County Football League, scoring three goals in four games in his first season. His contract was extended for the 22/23 season

== Honours ==
=== Club ===
Colchester United

- Football League One Runner-up (1): 2005–06
