= Robbie King (footballer) =

English footballer (born 1986)

Personal information
- Full name: Robert James King
- Date of birth: 1 October 1986 (age 40)
- Place of birth: Chelmsford, England
- Height: 6 ft 0 in (1.83 m)
- Position: Midfielder

Youth career
- Colchester United

Senior career*
Years	Team	Apps	(Gls)
2004–2007	Colchester United	5	(0)
2006	→ Staines Town (loan)	10	(4)
2006	→ Hereford United (loan)	5	(1)
2007	→ Heybridge Swifts (loan)	10	(1)
2007–2009	Heybridge Swifts	89	(17)
2009–2013	Canvey Island	110	(37)
- * Club domestic league appearances and goals as of 8 August 2007

Robert James King (born 1 October 1986) is an ex English professional footballer. He was born in Chelmsford.

King began his career as a trainee with Colchester United, turning professional in July 2004. On 9 September 2005, he made his league debut, replacing Pat Baldwin in the 74th minute of a 0–0 draw at Bristol City. He played twice more as a substitute in the league for Colchester and started two Football League Trophy games. In January 2006, shortly after returning from a loan spell with Staines Town, King played for Cambridge United's reserve side and looked set to join them on loan. joining Conference National Hereford United on loan in March 2006 until the end of the season.

On his return to Colchester, King failed to break back into the first team and was loaned to Heybridge Swifts on loan in January 2007.

King left Colchester to join Heybridge Swifts on 16 July 2007.
