= Jamie Cade =

English footballer

Personal information
- Full name: Jamie William Cade
- Date of birth: 15 January 1984 (age 42)
- Place of birth: Durham, England
- Height: 5 ft 8 in (1.73 m)
- Position: Forward

Team information
- Current team: Horsham

Youth career
- ?–2001: Middlesbrough

Senior career*
Years	Team	Apps	(Gls)
2001–2003	Middlesbrough	0	(0)
2003	→ Chesterfield (loan)	9	(2)
2003–2005	Colchester United	10	(0)
2005–2006	Crawley Town	15	(3)
2006–2008	Lewes	43	(9)
2008	→ Tonbridge Angels (loan)	5	(1)
2008–2010	Tonbridge Angels	37	(12)
2010	Hastings United	23	(1)
2010–2011	Horsham	22	(10)
2011	Lewes	7	(0)
2011–2013	Crawley Down	0	(0)
2013–	Horsham	45	(18)

International career
2000–2001	England U16	9	(0)
- * Club domestic league appearances and goals

Jamie William Cade (born 15 January 1984) is an English footballer who plays as a forward for Horsham.

== Playing career ==
Cade started his career at Middlesbrough, signing as a youth team player where he played as a forward or as a central defender. Scoring 15 goals in the 20 Academy games in the first season prompted Bryan Robson (current first team manager) to have a look, choosing to watch his old club Manchester United. The result was a four-goal display from Cade and a run a way 6–1 victory for Middlesbrough.

Cade went on to represent England Youth on a number of occasions, from under 15's to under 19's. The highlight being picked for the FIFA European Championships, held in England. England finished fourth that year being knocked out of the semi-finals by France at Newcastle's St James Park in front of 26,500 spectators. Spain, boasting Fernando Torres and Iniesta won the final. Steve McClaren gave Cade his first team debut in the League Cup defeat to Ipswich Town wearing the number 41 squad number. It proved to also be his last game for the club. Finding it difficult to get into the first team, Cade went out on loan to Chesterfield, spending two months on loan scoring three league and cup goals wearing the number 27 squad number under manager Roy McFarland.

His impressive start to league football alerted Colchester United to pursue his services and Cade signed for them on 3 November. That season proved to be a successful one for the club which saw them in fifth round of the FA Cup and staying in the playoff places of League One for a long time. Cade's time at Colchester proved to be unsuccessful playing the majority of games in midfield wearing the number 11 squad number and failing to score in any of the 25 games he played. His contract was not renewed at the end of the season by manager Phil Parkinson.

He had brief spells with Inverness Caledonian Thistle and Darlington before joining Crawley Town under Francis Vines. Having scored four league and cup goals under Vines and caretaker Simon Wormull, Cade went on loan to Lewes in the Conference South after Vines was sacked and former Chelsea legend John Hollins took charge. The spell at Lewes proved successful scoring seven goals in his time there taking his season tally to 11. Cade went on to play 96 games for Lewes scoring 21 goals in his time. A conference South league winners medal was his first silverware and the best finish of the club's history.

Cade had a brief loan spell at Tonbridge Angels, where he later signed a two-year contract under manager Tommy Warrilow playing in the Isthmian Premier League. The first season ending with a 15-goal tally, in a playoff defeat to the hands of Carshalton Athletic. The following season was a struggle scoring just five times in a season ending way outside the playoff spots.

Cade left Tonbridge and signed for Hastings United of the Isthmian Premier League under the guidance of Tony Dolby. Cade left Hastings the day Tony Dolby was sacked and signed for Horsham under John Mags. Horsham finished the season just above the relegation zone and Cade proved popular with manager John Mags who publicly praised Cade in the local media saying the club owed a lot to Cade for his services and help retaining the Premier League status. Cade scored 10 of his 11 goals at Horsham after joining just before Christmas ending the season as runaway leading scorer.

Cade was brought back to Lewes for the 2011–12 season by his former manager Steve King. But left due a lack of games. Cade signed for Isthmian Division One South side Crawley Down in November 2011. He rejoined Horsham in June 2013.
