= 2021–22 Colchester United F.C. season =

Colchester United
2021–22 season
- Owner: Robbie Cowling
- Chairman: Robbie Cowling
- Head coach: Hayden Mullins (until 19 January)
- Stadium: Colchester Community Stadium
- League Two: 15th
- FA Cup: Second round
- EFL Cup: First round (eliminated by Birmingham City)
- EFL Trophy: Third round
- Top goalscorer: League: Freddie Sears (7); All: Freddie Sears (8)
- Highest home attendance: 3,013 v Sutton United, 26 October 2021
- Lowest home attendance: 731 v Gillingham, 7 September 2021
- Average home league attendance: 2,201
- Biggest win: 4–0 v AFC Sudbury, 5 November 2021
- Biggest defeat: 0–3 v Port Vale, 23 October 2021
Home colours	Away colours	Third colours

The 2021–22 season was Colchester United's 85th season in their history and their sixth successive season competing in League Two. Along with competing in League Two, the club also participated in the FA Cup, EFL Cup and EFL Trophy.

== Season overview ==
=== Pre-season ===
Colchester's place in League Two for the 2021–22 season was confirmed on 1 May 2021 in their penultimate game of the season following a 1–0 win against Salford City.

On 13 May, following the close of the 2020–21 season having led the U's to safety, Mullins was named permanent head coach of Colchester United.

The club announced the retained list for the 2021–22 season on 14 May. Harry Beadle, Ryan Clampin, Sam Cornish, Billy Cracknell and Tom Eastman were offered new contracts, with Ben Stevenson and Michael Folivi awaiting contract decisions or discussions.

Players released at the end of their contracts included Joshua Bohui, 2020–21 top scorer Jevani Brown, Callum Coulter, Paris Cowan-Hall, Luke Gambin, Callum Harriott, Tom Lapslie, club captain Harry Pell, Courtney Senior, Omar Sowunmi and Diaz Wright.

On 25 May, long-serving defender Tom Eastman signed a new two-year contract with the club. Colchester also announced their first signing of the season with Cole Skuse joining from Ipswich Town on a two-year deal following his release from the Suffolk club.

On 4 June, young defenders Harry Beadle and Billy Cracknell signed one-year contracts with the club. Beadle joined up with the U's towards the end of the 2020–21 season with his contract at Charlton Athletic expiring, while Cracknell, who made his first-team debut last season, also agreed his first professional deal.

On 7 June, midfielder Sam Cornish joined Beadle and Cracknell in signing his first professional contract with the club, agreeing a one-year contract.

The same day, fellow midfielder Ben Stevenson revealed he would be leaving the club after two-and-a-half years with the U's.

Colchester announced the signing of both centre back Luke Chambers from Ipswich Town and midfielder Luke Hannant from Cambridge United on two-year deals on 10 June.

Left-back Ryan Clampin agreed a new two-year contract with the club on 11 June.

On 15 June, Colchester announced the re-signing of Freddie Sears on a two-year contract from Ipswich Town following his release. The club also revealed a new assistant manager, with Alex Dyer joining Hayden Mullins' team.

Colchester re-signed Frank Nouble for a third time on 18 June when he joined on a free transfer from Plymouth Argyle on a two-year deal. Joining alongside Nouble was Alan Judge who became the fourth player to sign for Colchester directly from Ipswich Town following his release.

Wales under-21 defender Cameron Coxe joined Colchester on loan from National League side Solihull Moors on 2 July. He signed initially until January 2022.

On 5 July, Brendan Sarpong-Wiredu and Tommy Smith both extended their contracts with the club by a further year, with both now set to expire in summer 2023. Junior Tchamadeu also signed a new deal by committing for three years until 2024.

Colchester played their first pre-season friendly on 13 July at Billericay Town. Second-half goals from Alan Judge, trialist Richard Kone, and Freddie Sears earned the U's a 3–0 victory.

Tommy Smith was announced as Colchester's new captain ahead of the new season following the departure of Harry Pell.

Colchester played two 60-minute matches against Watford on 17 July fielding entirely different teams in each. The Premier League club won the first match 2–1 with Alan Judge scoring the U's goal, and then won 2–0 in the second.

Colchester welcomed Tottenham Hotspur to the Colchester Community Stadium for a friendly on 21 July. Three first-half goals from Son Heung-min, Lucas Moura and Dele Alli were enough to give the Premier League side victory as fans returned to the stadium for the first time in seven months.

Gillingham were the visitors for the next home friendly on 24 July, but the U's suffered a 2–0 defeat to their League One opponents.

On 27 July, Colchester played out an entertaining 3–3 draw with local rivals Ipswich Town at the Community Stadium. Town took an early lead through Joe Pigott before former Ipswich man Tommy Smith headed the U's level. Former Colchester player Macauley Bonne scored for Ipswich to make it 2–1 but a header from another former Ipswich player Frank Nouble ensured the sides were level at the break. Summer signing Alan Judge put the hosts 3–2 up against his former club, but a late equaliser from Wes Burns ensured the game finished a draw.

The U's played their final friendly game of pre-season on 31 July as they hosted Wealdstone. Noah Chilvers scored for Colchester, but a late penalty scored by Josh Umerah meant the match ended 1–1.

=== August ===
On 2 August, Peterborough United signed midfielder Kwame Poku from Colchester for a "substantial six-figure fee" on a four-year contract.

On 4 August, Colchester confirmed the signing of Fulham forward Sylvester Jasper on loan until January 2022.

Ahead of their season opening game at Carlisle United on 7 August, Colchester signed Newcastle United goalkeeper Jake Turner on loan until January 2022.

Colchester's first game of the season away at Carlisle ended in a 0–0 draw. Luke Chambers, Cameron Coxe, Alan Judge, and Cole Skuse all made their debuts for the club, while Frank Nouble and Freddie Sears both made their third debuts for the U's. Sylvester Jasper made his first appearance for the club off the bench.

On 10 August, Colchester travelled to face Birmingham City in the first round of the EFL Cup. The U's were beaten 1–0 thanks to a deflected goal from Marcel Oakley. Meanwhile, Academy graduate Gene Kennedy made his debut for the club, replacing Cole Skuse after 66-minutes.

On 12 August, young defender Billy Cracknell joined National League South side Concord Rangers on loan until January 2022.

In their first home match of the season with fans back in attendance, Colchester were beaten 1–0 by Northampton Town on 14 August. Jon Guthrie's first-half goal won the match for the visitors, but they did have their captain Fraser Horsfall sent off for deliberate handball in the 84th-minute. Luke Hannant also came off the bench to make his debut for the club.

Ahead of their home match against Mansfield Town on 17 August, Colchester United announced the signing of Charlie Daniels on a one-year deal. He had been on trial at the club.

In the match against Mansfield, Daniels made his debut from the substitutes' bench, the visitors struck first through former U's loanee Elliott Hewitt in the 72nd-minute. However, Freddie Sears scored Colchester's first goal of the season in the fifth minute of added time from the penalty spot after Frank Nouble had been fouled.

Freddie Sears converted his second consecutive penalty kick within the first ten minutes of Colchester's game against Oldham Athletic on 21 August. Brendan Sarpong-Wiredu had been fouled in the penalty area by Oldham's Davis Keillor-Dunn. Just three minutes later, the U's were 2–0 up through a Noah Chilvers goal. Oldham pulled a goal back in the 73rd-minute, but Colchester held on for their first win of the season.

On 21 August, Harvey Sayer joined National League South side Billericay Town in a three-month loan deal.

Colchester drew 1–1 with Rochdale on 27 August. The U's took the lead through a Max Taylor own goal in the first-half, but the hosts equalised through Jimmy Keohane after 61-minutes.

On 31 August, Colchester signed forward Armando Dobra on loan from Ipswich Town until the end of the season.

=== September ===
On 3 September, Colchester announced the signing of young midfielder Chay Cooper from Tottenham Hotspur. Cooper would join Dave Hussey's under-23 squad.

Colchester's home match against Sutton United in League Two scheduled for 4 September was postponed due to a number of positive COVID-19 cases at Sutton, in addition to injuries and international call-ups meaning they could not fulfil the fixture.

Harry Beadle, Armando Dobra, and Jake Turner all made their club debuts in Colchester's 1–0 home defeat by Gillingham in the EFL Trophy on 7 September. Robbie McKenzie's 93rd-minute goal proved the difference between the two sides.

The U's played out an exciting match at Barrow on 10 September. The home side took the lead in the 25th-minute through Jordan Stevens after capitalising on a poor backpass from Tommy Smith. Colchester were level ten minutes later when Alan Judge scored his first goal for the club, tapping in Freddie Sears' low cross. Sears then put his side 2–1 ahead just three minutes later. In the second half, Luke Chambers was sent off for the visitors for a second bookable offence, and then Luke Hannant conceded a penalty eight minutes later from which the hosts scored. Tom Eastman headed in his first goal of the season on 80-minutes to put the U's 3–2 ahead. Barrow then had James Jones sent off for a second booking in quick succession in the 90th-minute, as Colchester held out for victory.

Colchester were defeated 1–0 at home by Crawley Town on 18 September. Jack Payne's 22nd-minute goal separated the two teams.

On 24 September, under-23 side regulars Ted Collins and Sam Cornish joined Maldon & Tiptree on loan.

The U's travelled to Swindon Town on 25 September where they held the hosts to a 0–0 draw.

On 28 September, Colchester hosted West Ham United Under-21s in the EFL Trophy group stage. Armando Dobra's seventh-minute goal, his first for the club, was enough to secure victory for the U's. Chay Cooper also made his first-team debut in the match.

=== October ===
On 2 October, Colchester were beaten 2–0 at home by Salford City. Two goals within the first 25-minutes sealed victory for the visitors, before goalscorer Brandon Thomas-Asante was sent off for a second bookable offence in the 88th-minute.

A second successive defeat followed for Colchester on 8 October when they were beaten 2–0 at Tranmere Rovers.

The U's earned their first league home win of the season on 16 October, beating second placed Harrogate Town 1–0. Sylvester Jasper's first goal for the club in the 88th-minute secured all three points for Colchester.

Colchester secured a late draw at home to Bristol Rovers on 19 October with Noah Chilvers scoring an 88th-minute equaliser after Brett Pitman's second-half opener. Junior Tchamadeu received his first career red card alongside Rovers' Trevor Clarke for violent conduct in the first minute of stoppage time. This followed Cian Harries' dismissal four minutes earlier for a second bookable offence, meaning Rovers finished the match with nine players.

Harvey Sayer joined Southern League Premier Division Central side Needham Market on loan on 21 October following his loan spell at Billericay.

On 23 October, Port Vale beat Colchester 3–0 at Vale Park.

Jake Hutchinson joined National League South side Tonbridge Angels in a month-long loan deal on 26 October.

Colchester were beaten in successive matches following the 3–1 home defeat by Sutton United on 26 October. Freddie Sears had scored his fourth goal of the season in only the second minute of the game, but Sutton soon equalised through David Ajiboye. Sutton were then awarded a penalty after Samson Tovide, starting his first league match for the U's, was sent off for handball in the box. The visitors then took the lead from the spot, before victory was sealed in the 61st minute with a goal from Ben Goodliffe.

On 30 October, Colchester signed Shawn McCoulsky from Forest Green Rovers on a short-term contract having been released from the club in the summer.

Later the same day, the U's recorded a 2–1 victory against bottom club Scunthorpe United. Colchester took a fifth-minute lead through Freddie Sears, scoring his fifth goal of the season. Armando Dobra then doubled the U's advantage with 14 minutes played. Eight minutes from full-time, the visitors scored a consolation goal through Harry Davis.

=== November ===
Colchester opened the FA Cup first round with a local derby against eighth-tier AFC Sudbury on 5 November. The U's took the lead with a close range Brendan Sarpong-Wiredu effort after 35 minutes of play, and doubled their advantage four minutes later through Freddie Sears. Sylvester Jasper scored the goal of the game with a curling effort into the far corner on 71 minutes. Shawn McCoulsky came on to make his club debut and marked the occasion with a goal in the third minute of stoppage time.

The U's drew 0–0 with Ipswich Town on 9 November in their third and final EFL Trophy group match and lost 4–3 following a penalty shoot-out. This meant Colchester finished third in the group and were eliminated from the competition. However the following day it was revealed West Ham Under-21s had been deducted three points for fielding a suspended player. This meant that Colchester would progress to the knockout stages by finishing the group in second place a point behind Ipswich with four points while West Ham were eliminated with three points.

On 20 November, Colchester were beaten 1–0 away at Stevenage. Elliott List's first-half penalty proved the difference between the two sides.

Colchester hosted Exeter City on 23 November who were on a 15-game unbeaten run coming into the match. Sylvester Jasper scored after 12-minutes and Noah Chilvers doubled the U's lead just before half-time. Pádraig Amond's 69th-minute goal brought high-flying Exeter back into the match, but Freddie Sears sealed the win with his seventh goal of the season five minutes later.

On 26 November, defender Billy Cracknell signed for Isthmian League Premier Division side Bishop's Stortford in a month-long loan deal.

Newport County visited the Community Stadium on 26 November. The visitors took the lead through Dom Telford after 36-minutes but Freddie Sears' eighth goal of the campaign with 78-minutes played ensured a point for both teams.

On 30 November, Colchester played Swindon Town in the Southern Section Round 2 of the EFL Trophy away from home where the U's beat them 1–2. Both goals were scored by Luke Chambers in the 6th and 11th minute.

=== December ===
On 5 December, Colchester faced Wigan Athletic in the second round of the FA Cup at home. Wigan opened the scoring in the 24th minute with a goal from Callum Lang. Freddie Sears’ goal from the edge of the box brought the U's back into the match in the 45+1 minute. Callum Lang scored his second of the game in the 74th minute of the game making the final score 1–2 to Wigan, knocking the U's out of the FA Cup.

On 8 December, Colchester faced Bradford City away from home in a goalless draw of 0-0

On 11 December, Colchester fell to a 3–0 defeat at Walsall with a brace from Otis Khan, and a goal from Jack Earling in the 66th minute to finish the U's off

January

On New Years Day, Colchester faced Crawley Town away from home, suffering a 3-1 loss with Freddie Sears scoring the only goal for the U’s

== Players ==
As of 30 October 2021

No.	Name	Position	Nat.	Place of birth	Date of birth	Apps	Goals	Signed from	Date signed	Fee
Goalkeepers
1	Dean Gerken	GK	(England)	Southend-on-Sea	22 May 1985 (aged 36)	205	0	(England) Ipswich Town	13 July 2019 (Note: Date of signing refers to the date of the player's signing for his second spell with the club)	Free transfer
24	Jake Turner	GK	(England)	Wilmslow	25 February 1999 (aged 22)	0	0	(England) Newcastle United	7 August 2021	On loan
29	Shamal George	GK	(England)	Birkenhead	6 January 1998 (aged 23)	18	0	(England) Liverpool	28 August 2020	Free transfer
44	Ted Collins	GK	(England)			0	0	Academy		Free transfer
Defenders
2	Miles Welch-Hayes	RB	(England)	Oxford	25 October 1996 (aged 24)	43	1	(England) Macclesfield Town	21 February 2020	Free transfer
3	Ryan Clampin	LB/LW	(England)	Colchester	29 January 1999 (aged 22)	40	2	Academy	30 May 2018	Free transfer
4	Luke Chambers	CB	(England)	Kettering	28 September 1985 (aged 35)	0	0	(England) Ipswich Town	10 June 2021	Free transfer
5	Tommy Smith (c)	CB	(New Zealand)	(England) Macclesfield	31 March 1990 (aged 31)	53	2	(England) Sunderland	25 August 2020	Free transfer
18	Tom Eastman	CB	(England)	Colchester	21 October 1991 (aged 29)	411	22	(England) Ipswich Town	19 May 2011	Free transfer
22	Junior Tchamadeu	RB	(England)	Redbridge	22 December 2003 (aged 17)	11	0	Academy	2020	Free transfer
23	Charlie Daniels	DF	(England)	Harlow	7 September 1986 (aged 34)	0	0	(England) Portsmouth	17 August 2021	Free transfer
26	Lordon Akolbire	DF	(England)		28 May 2003 (aged 18)	0	0	Academy		Free transfer
27	Cameron Coxe	DF	(Wales)	Merthyr Tydfil	18 December 1998 (aged 22)	0	0	(England) Solihull Moors	2 July 2021	Undisclosed
30	Al-Amin Kazeem	LB	(England)		6 April 2002 (aged 19)	0	0	Academy		Free transfer
35	Billy Cracknell	DF	(England)	Brentwood	19 January 2002 (aged 19)	1	0	Academy		Free transfer
36	Harvey Sayer	LB	(England)	Gorleston-on-Sea	6 January 2003 (aged 18)	5	0	Academy		Free transfer
40	Frankie Terry	CB	(England)			0	0	Academy		Free transfer
43	Harry Beadle	DF	(England)			0	0	(England) Charlton Athletic	4 June 2021	Free transfer
Midfielders
6	Brendan Sarpong-Wiredu	MF	(England)	London	7 November 1999 (aged 21)	30	1	(England) Charlton Athletic	1 February 2021	Undisclosed
7	Luke Hannant	MF	(England)	Great Yarmouth	4 November 1993 (aged 27)	0	0	(England) Cambridge United	10 June 2021	Free transfer
8	Cole Skuse	DM	(England)	Yate	29 March 1986 (aged 35)	0	0	(England) Ipswich Town	25 May 2021	Free transfer
10	Alan Judge	AM	(Republic of Ireland)	Dublin	11 November 1988 (aged 32)	0	0	(England) Ipswich Town	18 June 2021	Free transfer
14	Noah Chilvers	AM	(England)	Chelmsford	22 February 2001 (aged 20)	54	3	Academy	3 July 2017	Free transfer
20	Diogo Freitas Gouveia	MF	(Portugal)		16 June 2001 (aged 19)	0	0	Academy		Free transfer
21	Gene Kennedy	MF	(England)		18 April 2003 (aged 18)	0	0	Academy		Free transfer
25	Andre Hasanally	MF	(England)	Waltham Forest	10 February 2002 (aged 19)	2	0	Academy		Free transfer
31	Donell Thomas	MF	(England)		4 August 2003 (aged 17)	0	0	Academy		Free transfer
33	Marley Marshall-Miranda	MF	(England)		22 October 2002 (aged 18)	5	0	Academy		Free transfer
37	Chay Cooper	MF	(England)		17 November 2001 (aged 19)	0	0	(England) Tottenham Hotspur	3 September 2021	Free transfer
41	Sam Cornish	MF	(England)	Brentwood	26 September 2001 (aged 19)	0	0	Academy		Free transfer
Forwards
9	Frank Nouble	CF	(England)	Lewisham	24 September 1991 (aged 29)	112	17	(England) Plymouth Argyle	18 June 2021 (Note: Date of signing refers to the date of the player's signing for his third spell with the club)	Free transfer
11	Freddie Sears	ST	(England)	Hornchurch	27 November 1989 (aged 31)	109	36	(England) Ipswich Town	15 June 2021	Free transfer
15	Shawn McCoulsky	ST	(England)	Lewisham	6 January 1997 (aged 24)	0	0	(England) Forest Green Rovers	30 October 2021	Free transfer
17	Sylvester Jasper	FW	(Bulgaria)	(England) Southwark	13 September 2001 (aged 19)	0	0	(England) Fulham	4 August 2021	On loan
19	Armando Dobra	WG/AM	(Albania)	(England) Redbridge	14 April 2001 (aged 20)	0	0	(England) Ipswich Town	31 August 2021	On loan
32	Jake Hutchinson	CF	(England)	Colchester	8 May 2002 (aged 19)	0	0	Academy		Free transfer
34	Samson Tovide	CF	(England)		4 January 2004 (aged 17)	1	0	Academy		Free transfer
42	Tom Stagg	CF	(England)	Harlow	9 September 2002 (aged 18)	1	0	Academy		Free transfer

== Transfers and contracts ==
=== In ===
Date	Position	Nationality	Name	From	Fee	Ref.
25 May 2021	DM	(England)	Cole Skuse	(England) Ipswich Town	Free transfer	(Note: Officially joined the club on 1 July 2021)
4 June 2021	DF	(England)	Harry Beadle	(England) Charlton Athletic	Free transfer	
10 June 2021	CB	(England)	Luke Chambers	(England) Ipswich Town	Free transfer	
10 June 2021	MF	(England)	Luke Hannant	(England) Cambridge United	Free transfer	
15 June 2021	ST	(England)	Freddie Sears	(England) Ipswich Town	Free transfer	
18 June 2021	AM	(Republic of Ireland)	Alan Judge	(England) Ipswich Town	Free transfer	
18 June 2021	CF	(England)	Frank Nouble	(England) Plymouth Argyle	Free transfer	
13 August 2021	WG	(England)	Bryan Ifeanyi	(England) Leyton Orient	Free transfer	
17 August 2021	DF	(England)	Charlie Daniels	(England) Portsmouth	Free transfer	
3 September 2021	MF	(England)	Chay Cooper	(England) Tottenham Hotspur	Free transfer	
30 October 2021	ST	(England)	Shawn McCoulsky	(England) Forest Green Rovers	Free transfer	
6 January 2022	DF	(England)	Tom Dallison	(England) Crawley Town	Undisclosed	
7 January 2022	DF	(Wales)	Cameron Coxe	(England) Solihull Moors	Undisclosed	
15 January 2022	DM	(Wales)	Emyr Huws	(England) Ipswich Town	Free transfer	
27 January 2022	CF	(England)	John Akinde	(England) Gillingham	Free transfer	
31 January 2022	CB	(England)	Camron Gbadebo	(England) Manchester City	Undisclosed	

=== Out ===
Date	Position	Nationality	Name	To	Fee	Ref.
14 May 2021	FW	(England)	Joshua Bohui	(England) Waltham Abbey (Note: Following Joshua Bohui's release by Colchester United, he later signed for Waltham Abbey.)	Released	(Note: Officially left the club on 1 July 2021)
14 May 2021	AM	(Jamaica)	Jevani Brown	(England) Exeter City (Note: Following Jevani Brown's release by Colchester United, he later signed for Exeter City.)	Released	
14 May 2021	GK	(England)	Callum Coulter	(England) Harrow Borough (Note: Following Callum Coulter's release by Colchester United, he later signed for Harrow Borough.)	Released	
14 May 2021	WG	(England)	Paris Cowan-Hall	Free agent	Released	
14 May 2021	WG	(Malta)	Luke Gambin	(Malta) Ħamrun Spartans (Note: Following Luke Gambin's release by Colchester United, he later signed for Ħamrun Spartans.)	Released	
14 May 2021	WG	(Guyana)	Callum Harriott	Free agent	Released	
14 May 2021	CM	(England)	Tom Lapslie	(England) Torquay United (Note: Following Tom Lapslie's release by Colchester United, he later signed for Torquay United.)	Released	
14 May 2021	MF	(England)	Harry Pell	(England) Accrington Stanley	Released	
14 May 2021	WG	(England)	Courtney Senior	(Wales) Newport County (Note: Following Courtney Senior's release by Colchester United, he later signed for Newport County.)	Released	
14 May 2021	CB	(England)	Omar Sowunmi	(England) Bromley (Note: Following Omar Sowunmi's release by Colchester United, he later signed for Bromley.)	Released	
14 May 2021	MF	(England)	Diaz Wright	Free agent	Released	
7 June 2021	MF	(England)	Ben Stevenson	(England) Forest Green Rovers	Free transfer	
2 August 2021	MF	(Ghana)	Kwame Poku	(England) Peterborough United	Undisclosed	
3 January 2022	ST	(England)	Shawn McCoulsky	(England) Maidenhead United (Note: Following Shawn McCoulsky's release by Colchester United, he later signed for Maidenhead United.)	Released	
20 January 2022	LB	(England)	Charlie Daniels	Free agent	Mutual consent	

=== Loans in ===
Date	Position	Nationality	Name	From	End date	Ref.
2 July 2021	DF	(Wales)	Cameron Coxe	(England) Solihull Moors	January 2022	
4 August 2021	FW	(Bulgaria)	Sylvester Jasper	(England) Fulham	January 2022	
7 August 2021	GK	(England)	Jake Turner	(England) Newcastle United	January 2022	
31 August 2021	WG/AM	(Albania)	Armando Dobra	(England) Ipswich Town	End of season	
8 January 2022	CF	(England)	Corie Andrews	(England) AFC Wimbledon	End of season	
17 January 2022	RW	(England)	Owura Edwards	(England) Bristol City	End of season	
20 January 2022	LB	(England)	Myles Kenlock	(England) Ipswich Town	End of season	
31 January 2022	GK	(England)	Sam Hornby	(England) Bradford City	End of season	
31 January 2022	RW	(Republic of Ireland)	Tyreik Wright	(England) Aston Villa	End of season	

=== Loans out ===
Date	Position	Nationality	Name	To	End date	Ref.
12 August 2021	DF	(England)	Billy Cracknell	(England) Concord Rangers	January 2022	
13 August 2021	WG	(England)	Bryan Ifeanyi	(England) Maldon & Tiptree		
21 August 2021	LB	(England)	Harvey Sayer	(England) Billericay Town	October 2021	
24 September 2021	GK	(England)	Ted Collins	(England) Maldon & Tiptree		
24 September 2021	MF	(England)	Sam Cornish	(England) Maldon & Tiptree		
21 October 2021	LB	(England)	Harvey Sayer	(England) Needham Market		
26 October 2021	CF	(England)	Jake Hutchinson	(England) Tonbridge Angels	21 November 2021	
26 November 2021	CB	(England)	Billy Cracknell	(England) Bishop's Stortford	26 December 2021	
31 January 2022	CF	(England)	Frank Nouble	(England) Leyton Orient	End of season	

=== Contracts ===
New contracts and contract extensions.

Date	Position	Nationality	Name	Length	Expiry	Ref.
25 May 2021	CB	(England)	Tom Eastman	2 years	June 2023	
25 May 2021	DM	(England)	Cole Skuse	2 years	June 2023	
4 June 2021	DF	(England)	Harry Beadle	1 year	June 2022	
4 June 2021	DF	(England)	Billy Cracknell	1 year	June 2022	
7 June 2021	MF	(England)	Sam Cornish	1 year	June 2022	
10 June 2021	CB	(England)	Luke Chambers	2 years	June 2023	
10 June 2021	MF	(England)	Luke Hannant	2 years	June 2023	
11 June 2021	LB/LW	(England)	Ryan Clampin	2 years	June 2023	
15 June 2021	ST	(England)	Freddie Sears	2 years	June 2023	
18 June 2021	AM	(Republic of Ireland)	Alan Judge	2 years	June 2023	
18 June 2021	CF	(England)	Frank Nouble	2 years	June 2023	
5 July 2021	MF	(England)	Brendan Sarpong-Wiredu	2 years	June 2023	
5 July 2021	CB	(England)	Tommy Smith	2 years	June 2023	
5 July 2021	RB	(England)	Junior Tchamadeu	3 years	June 2024	
17 August 2021	DF	(England)	Charlie Daniels	1 year	June 2022	

== Match details ==
=== Pre-season friendlies ===
Colchester United announced they would play friendlies against Billericay Town, Watford, Tottenham Hotspur, Gillingham, Ipswich Town and Wealdstone as part of their pre-season preparations.

13 July 2021 Friendly	Billericay Town	0–3	Colchester United	Billericay
19:30 BST		Report	Judge 66'; Kone 75'; Sears 87'	Stadium: New Lodge; Attendance: 500

17 July 2021 Friendly	Watford	2–1	Colchester United	London Colney
	Sarr; Mebude	Report	Judge	Stadium: Watford Football Club Training Ground

17 July 2021 Friendly	Watford	2–0	Colchester United	London Colney
	Hernández; Gosling	Report		Stadium: Watford Football Club Training Ground

21 July 2021 Friendly	Colchester United	0–3	Tottenham Hotspur	Colchester
19:45 BST		Report	Son 12'; Lucas 14'; Alli 37'	Stadium: Colchester Community Stadium; Referee: Craig Hicks

24 July 2021 Friendly	Colchester United	0–2	Gillingham	Colchester
13:00 BST		Report	Reeves 10'; Tucker 80'	Stadium: Colchester Community Stadium

27 July 2021 Friendly	Colchester United	3–3	Ipswich Town	Colchester
19:45 BST	Smith 27'; Nouble 41'; Judge 70'	Report	Pigott 6'; Bonne 29'; Burns 87'	Stadium: Colchester Community Stadium

31 July 2021 Friendly	Colchester United	1–1	Wealdstone	Colchester
15:00 BST	Chilvers 8'	Report	Umerah 90' (pen.)	Stadium: Colchester Community Stadium

=== League Two ===
==== League table ====
Pos	Team	Pld	W	D	L	GF	GA	GD	Pts
12	Crawley Town	46	17	10	19	56	66	−10	61
13	Leyton Orient	46	14	16	16	62	47	+15	58
14	Bradford City	46	14	16	16	53	55	−2	58
15	Colchester United	46	14	13	19	48	60	−12	55
16	Walsall	46	14	12	20	47	60	−13	54
17	Hartlepool United	46	14	12	20	44	64	−20	54
18	Rochdale	46	12	17	17	51	59	−8	53

Source: EFL Official Website
Rules for classification: 1) Points; 2) Goal difference; 3) Number of goals scored; 4) Head-to-head results; 5) Wins; 6) Away goals; 7) Penalty points (sec 9.5); 8) 12-point sending off offences

==== Results summary ====
Overall								Home						Away					
Pld	W	D	L	GF	GA	GD	Pts	W	D	L	GF	GA	GD	W	D	L	GF	GA	GD
46	14	13	19	48	60	−12	55	6	9	8	25	28	−3	8	4	11	23	32	−9

Last updated: 7 May 2022.
Source: https://www.soccerstats.com/homeaway.asp?league=england4

==== Results round by round ====
Matchday	1	2	3	4	5	6	7	8	9	10	11	12	13	14	15	16	17	18	19	20	21	22	23	24	25	26	27	28	29	30	31	32	33	34	35	36	37	38	39	40	41	42	43	44	45	46
Ground	A	H	H	A	A	A	H	A	H	A	H	H	A	H	H	A	H	H	A	A	A	A	H	A	A	H	H	A	A	H	A	H	H	H	H	A	A	H	H	A	H	A	H	A	H	A
Result	D	L	D	W	D	W	L	D	L	L	W	D	L	L	W	L	W	D	D	L	L	L	L	L	W	D	D	W	L	D	L	L	D	D	W	W	L	L	W	W	L	L	W	W	D	W
Position	14	17	17	13	10	8	16	16	18	20	19	19	19	19	17	20	19	17	18	20	20	22	22	22	22	22	21	20	20	21	21	21	21	20	19	19	19	20	19	19	20	20	19	19	19	15

Updated to match(es) played on 7 May 2022. Source: 11v11 for league tables and fixtures
A = Away; H = Home; W = Win; D = Draw; L = Loss

==== Matches ====
The 2021–22 League Two fixtures were announced on 24 June 2021.

7 August 2021 1	Carlisle United	0–0	Colchester United	Carlisle
15:15 BST		Report		Stadium: Brunton Park; Attendance: 6,382; Referee: Peter Wright

14 August 2021 2	Colchester United	0–1	Northampton Town	Colchester
15:00 BST		Report	Guthrie 22'; Horsfall (red card) 84'	Stadium: Colchester Community Stadium; Attendance: 2,772; Referee: Trevor Kettle

17 August 2021 3	Colchester United	1–1	Mansfield Town	Colchester
19:45 BST	Sears 90+5' (pen.)	Report	Hewitt 72'	Stadium: Colchester Community Stadium; Attendance: 2,354; Referee: Sam Allison

21 August 2021 4	Oldham Athletic	1–2	Colchester United	Colchester
15:00 BST	Bahamboula 73'	Report	Sears 9' (pen.); Chilvers 12'	Stadium: Colchester Community Stadium; Attendance: 3,496; Referee: Sam Barrott

27 August 2021 5	Rochdale	1–1	Colchester United	Rochdale
19:45 BST	Keohane 61'	Report	Taylor 40' (o.g.)	Stadium: Spotland Stadium; Attendance: 3,054; Referee: Rebecca Welch

10 September 2021 6	Barrow	2–3	Colchester United	Barrow-in-Furness
19:45 BST	Stevens 25'; Banks 76' (pen.); Jones (yellow card) 88' (yellow-red card) 90'	Report	Judge 35'; Sears 38'; Eastman 80'; Chambers (yellow card) 50' (yellow-red card) 68'	Stadium: Holker Street; Attendance: 2,430; Referee: Simon Mather

18 September 2021 7	Colchester United	0–1	Crawley Town	Colchester
15:00 BST		Report	Payne 22'	Stadium: Colchester Community Stadium; Attendance: 2,640; Referee: Chris Sarginson

25 September 2021 8	Swindon Town	0–0	Colchester United	Swindon
15:00 BST		Report		Stadium: County Ground; Attendance: 8,436; Referee: Andrew Kitchen

2 October 2021 9	Colchester United	0–2	Salford City	Colchester
15:00 BST		Report	Thomas-Asante 10' (yellow card) 59' (yellow-red card) 88'; Elliott 25'	Stadium: Colchester Community Stadium; Attendance: 2,566; Referee: Craig Hicks

8 October 2021 10	Tranmere Rovers	2–0	Colchester United	Birkenhead
19:45 BST	Hawkes 54'; Clarke 71'	Report		Stadium: Prenton Park; Attendance: 7,324; Referee: James Oldham

16 October 2021 11	Colchester United	1–0	Harrogate Town	Colchester
15:00 BST	Jasper 88'	Report		Stadium: Colchester Community Stadium; Attendance: 2,439; Referee: Tom Reeves

19 October 2021 12	Colchester United	1–1	Bristol Rovers	Colchester
19:45 BST	Chilvers 88'; Tchamadeu (red card) 90+1'	Report	Pitman 58'; Harries (yellow card) 51' (yellow-red card) 87'; Clarke (red card) 90+1'	Stadium: Colchester Community Stadium; Attendance: 2,069; Referee: Graham Scott

23 October 2021 13	Port Vale	3–0	Colchester United	Burslem
15:00 BST	Gibbons 6'; Wilson 16'; Martin 61'	Report		Stadium: Vale Park; Attendance: 5,423; Referee: Seb Stockbridge

26 October 2021 14	Colchester United	1–3	Sutton United	Colchester
19:45 BST	Sears 2'; Tovide (red card) 27'	Report	Ajiboye 12'; Milsom 28' (pen.); Goodliffe 61'	Stadium: Colchester Community Stadium; Attendance: 3,013; Referee: Bobby Madley

30 October 2021 15	Colchester United	2–1	Scunthorpe United	Colchester
15:00 BST	Sears 5'; Dobra 14'	Report	Davis 82'	Stadium: Colchester Community Stadium; Attendance: 2,433; Referee: Gavin Ward

20 November 2021 16	Stevenage	1–0	Colchester United	Stevenage
15:00 GMT	List 45+3' (pen.)	Report		Stadium: Broadhall Way; Attendance: 2,683; Referee: Trevor Kettle

23 November 2021 17	Colchester United	3–1	Exeter City	Colchester
19:45 GMT	Jasper 12'; Chilvers 45+3'; Sears 74'	Report	Amond 69'	Stadium: Colchester Community Stadium; Attendance: 2,028; Referee: Tom Nield

26 November 2021 18	Colchester United	1–1	Newport County	Colchester
19:45 GMT	Sears 78'	Report	Telford 36'	Stadium: Colchester Community Stadium; Attendance: 2,401; Referee: Christopher Pollard

8 December 2021 19	Bradford City	0–0	Colchester United	Bradford
19:45 GMT	Watt (yellow card) 85'	Report	Chilvers (yellow card) 77'; Smith (yellow card) 87'	Stadium: Utilita Energy Stadium; Referee: Marc Edwards

11 December 2021 20	Walsall	3–0	Colchester United	Bescot
15:00 GMT	Khan 22', 32'; Earing 66'; Ward (yellow card) 78'	Report		Stadium: Banks's Stadium; Attendance: 4,065; Referee: Martin Coy

1 January 2022 21	Crawley Town	3–1	Colchester United	Crawley
15:00 GMT	Nadesan 15', 55'; Lynch 37'; Ferry (yellow card) 88'	Report	Sarpong-Wiredu (yellow card) 31'; Skuse (yellow card) 76'; Sears 79'	Stadium: The People's Pension Stadium; Attendance: 2,022; Referee: Sam Purkiss

11 January 2022 22	Forest Green Rovers	2–0	Colchester United	Nailsworth
19:45 GMT	Matt 15'; Stevenson (yellow card) 44'; March 90+2'	Report	Sarpong-Wiredu (yellow card) 32'	Stadium: The Fully Charged New Lawn; Attendance: 1,829; Referee: Ben Speedie

15 January 2022 23	Colchester United	0–2	Barrow	Colchester
15:00 GMT	Dallison (yellow card) 78'	Report	Platt (yellow card) 24'; Dallison 54' (o.g.); Hutton (yellow card) 81'; Jones (yellow card) 84'; Kay 90+1'	Stadium: JobServe Community Stadium; Attendance: 2,297; Referee: Will Finnie

18 January 2022 24	Sutton United	3–2	Colchester United	Sutton
19:45 GMT	Olaofe 9', 64'; Smith (yellow card) 45+2'; Eastmond (yellow card) 57'; Randall 90+2'	Report	Edwards 3'; Dallison (yellow card) 21'; Sears 44' (pen.), (yellow card) 58'; Huws (yellow card) 75'; Smith (yellow card) 77'	Stadium: Borough Sports Ground; Referee: Robert Lewis

22 January 2022 25	Salford City	0–3	Colchester United	Salford
15:00 GMT	Turnbull (yellow card) 50'; Watson (yellow card) 54'	Report	Chambers 30'; Kenlock 33'; Huws (yellow card) 61'; Andrews 82'	Stadium: Peninsula Stadium; Referee: Ollie Yates

29 January 2022 26	Colchester United	1–1	Swindon Town	Colchester
15:00 GMT	Tchamadeu (yellow card) 57'; Hannant (yellow card) 60'; George (red card) 72'; Chambers (red card) 87'; Huws 90+2'; Sears (yellow card) 90+5'	Report	Lyden (yellow card) 43'; McKirdy 68'; Conroy (yellow card) 90'	Stadium: JobServe Community Stadium; Attendance: 3,327; Referee: Chris Sarginson

1 February 2022 27	Colchester United	1–1	Rochdale	Colchester
19:45 GMT	Skuse (yellow card) 41'; Judge 53'	Report	O'Connell (yellow card) 65'; Grant 76'	Stadium: JobServe Community Stadium; Attendance: 2,298; Referee: Craig Hicks

5 February 2022 28	Leyton Orient	0–1	Colchester United	Leyton
15:00 GMT	Moss (yellow card) 49'; Young (yellow card) 90+6'	Report	Sears 4', (yellow card) 40'; Welch-Hayes (yellow card) 83'; Kennedy (yellow card) 90+5'	Stadium: Breyer Group Stadium; Attendance: 5,641; Referee: Tom Reeves

8 February 2022 29	Mansfield Town	2–1	Colchester United	Mansfield
19:45 GMT	O'Toole (yellow card) 18'; Oates 19'; Akins (yellow card) 83'; Bowery 90+2' (pen.); Hewitt (yellow card) 90+6'	Report	Sarpong-Wiredu (yellow card) 23'; Kennedy (yellow card) 69'; Judge 90+7'	Stadium: One Call Stadium; Attendance: 4,815; Referee: Darren Handley

12 February 2022 30	Colchester United	2–2	Carlisle United	Colchester
15:00 GMT	Smith 69'; Chambers (yellow card) 70'; Wright 74'	Report	Riley (yellow card) 33'; Roberts (yellow card) 41'; Patrick 51'; Mellish (yellow card) 65'; Sho-Silva 86'	Stadium: JobServe Community Stadium; Attendance: 2,664; Referee: Lee Swabey

19 February 2022 31	Northampton Town	3–0	Colchester United	Sixfields
14:00 GMT	Horsfall 16'; Hoskins 49'; Ashley-Seal 90+4'	Report	Judge (yellow card) 35'	Stadium: Sixfields Stadium; Attendance: 5,309; Referee: Ben Toner

22 February 2022 32	Colchester United	1–2	Hartlepool United	Colchester
19:45 GMT	Chilvers 22', (yellow card) 50'; Edwards (yellow card) 90'	Report	Byrne (yellow card) 66'; Bogle 70'; Fletcher 74', (yellow card) 74'	Stadium: JobServe Community Stadium; Attendance: 2,115; Referee: Declan Bourne

26 February 2022 33	Colchester United	1–1	Oldham Athletic	Colchester
15:00 GMT	Clarke 52' (o.g.); Sears (yellow card) 90+1'	Report	Keillor-Dunn 19'; Stobbs (yellow card) 24'	Stadium: JobServe Community Stadium; Attendance: 2,983; Referee: Andy Haines

1 March 2022 34	Colchester United	2–2	Leyton Orient	Colchester
19:45 GMT	Judge (yellow card) 36'; Kenlock 75'; Edwards 79'; Sears (yellow card) 90+6'	Report	Sotiriou (yellow card) 11', (goal) 66'; Young (yellow card) 41'; Smith (yellow card) 78'; Smyth (yellow card) 90+2'; Coleman 90+3'	Stadium: JobServe Community Stadium; Attendance: 3,415; Referee: Neil Hair

5 March 2022 35	Colchester United	1–0	Port Vale	Colchester
15:00 GMT	Dallison 85'	Report	Worrall (yellow card) 90+6'	Stadium: JobServe Community Stadium; Attendance: 2,772; Referee: Brett Huxtable

12 March 2022 36	Scunthorpe United	1–3	Colchester United	Scunthorpe
15:00 GMT	Nuttall 11'	Report	Chilvers 60', 76'; Edwards 67'	Stadium: Sands Venue Stadium; Attendance: 2,427; Referee: Alan Young

15 March 2022 37	Bristol Rovers	1–0	Colchester United	Horfield
19:45 GMT	Anderson 49'; Evans (yellow card) 90+2'	Report	Skuse (yellow card) 15'; Hannant (yellow card) 42'; Edwards (yellow card) 70'	Stadium: Memorial Stadium; Attendance: 7,314; Referee: Sam Allison

21 March 2022 38	Colchester United	0–1	Forest Green Rovers	Colchester
19:45 GMT	Coxe (yellow card) 65'	Report	Stevens 9'	Stadium: JobServe Community Stadium; Attendance: 6,140; Referee: Andy Woolmer

26 March 2022 39	Colchester United	1–0	Tranmere Rovers	Colchester
15:00 GMT	Skuse (yellow card) 73'; Hannant (yellow card) 82'; Tchamadeu 90+5'	Report	Foley (yellow card) 82'; Jolley (yellow card) 84'; Clarke (yellow card) 90+6'; Davies (yellow card) 90+7'	Stadium: JobServe Community Stadium; Attendance: 2,459; Referee: Carl Brook

2 April 2022 40	Harrogate Town	1–2	Colchester United	Harrogate
15:00 BST	Muldoon 4'	Report	Tchamadeu (yellow card) 21'; Sears 21'; Chilvers 45', (yellow card) 53'; Coxe (yellow card) 78'	Stadium: The EnviroVent Stadium; Attendance: 1,615; Referee: Simon Mather

9 April 2022 41	Colchester United	0–2	Stevenage	Colchester
15:00 BST	Sarpong-Wiredu (yellow card) 30'; Eastman (yellow card) 53'; Kenlock (yellow card) 90+3'	Report	Reid 45+6', (yellow card) 57'; Norris 49', (yellow card) 51' (yellow-red card) 84'; Coker (yellow card) 77'; Carter (yellow card) 90+1'	Stadium: JobServe Community Stadium; Attendance: 3,094; Referee: Sam Barrott

15 April 2022 42	Exeter City	2–0	Colchester United	Exeter
13:00 BST	Sparkes 32'; Zanzala 63'	Report	Coxe (yellow card) 66'	Stadium: St James Park; Attendance: 7,549; Referee: Will Finnie

18 April 2022 43	Colchester United	3–0	Bradford City	Colchester
15:00 BST	Kenlock 16'; Sarpong-Wiredu 32'; Sears 75'	Report	O'Connor (yellow card) 52' (yellow-red card) 66'	Stadium: JobServe Community Stadium; Attendance: 2,893; Referee: Darren Handley

22 April 2022 44	Newport County	1–2	Colchester United	Newport
19:45 BST	Dolan (yellow card) 38'; Telford 40'; Lewis (yellow card) 45+2'; Bennett (yellow card) 72'	Report	Sarpong-Wiredu (yellow card) 45+2'; Huws (yellow card) 66'; Akinde 68'; Chilvers 77'; Skuse (yellow card) 89'	Stadium: Rodney Parade; Referee: Tom Reeves

30 April 2022 45	Colchester United	2–2	Walsall	Colchester
15:00 BST	Sears 24', 56' (pen.)	Report	Kiernan 39'; Miller 48'; Monthé (yellow card) 83'	Stadium: JobServe Community Stadium; Attendance: 3,520; Referee: Dean Whitestone

7 May 2022 46	Hartlepool United	0–2	Colchester United	Hartlepool
15:00 BST	Hull (yellow card) 90+2'	Report	Akinde 9'; Cooper 53'; Smith (yellow card) 79'	Stadium: The Suit Direst Stadium; Attendance: 5,375; Referee: Ben Toner

=== FA Cup ===
Colchester were drawn away to AFC Sudbury in the first round and at home to Wigan Athletic in second round.

5 November 2021 First round	AFC Sudbury	0–4	Colchester United	Sudbury
19:55 GMT		Report	Sarpong-Wiredu 35'; Sears 39'; Jasper 71'; McCoulsky 90+3'	Stadium: King's Marsh; Attendance: 2,000; Referee: James Bell

5 December 2021 Second round	Colchester United	1–2	Wigan Athletic	Colchester
12:30 GMT	Jasper (yellow card) 6'; Dobra (yellow card) 42'; Sears 45+1'	Report	Lang 24', 75'; Cousins (yellow card) 62'; Edwards (yellow card) 81'	Stadium: JobServe Community Stadium; Attendance: 2,056; Referee: Carl Brook

=== EFL Cup ===
Colchester were drawn away to Birmingham City in the first round of the EFL Cup.

10 August 2021 First round	Birmingham City	1–0	Colchester United	Birmingham
19:45 BST	Oakley 75'	Report		Stadium: St Andrew's; Referee: Declan Bourne

=== EFL Trophy ===
Colchester United were drawn into Southern Group A alongside Gillingham, Ipswich Town and West Ham United U21s. The fixture dates for the group stage ties were announced on 7 July. In the knock-out stages, The U's were drawn away to Sutton United in the third round.

Pos	Div	Team	Pld	W	PW	PL	L	GF	GA	GD	Pts	Qualification
1	L1	Ipswich Town	3	1	1	0	1	3	2	+1	5	Advance to Round 2
2	L2	Colchester United	3	1	0	1	1	1	1	0	4	Advance to Round 2
3	ACA	West Ham United U21	3	2	0	0	1	4	2	+2	3 (Note: West Ham U21 deducted 3 points for fielding an ineligible player in their match with Gillingham.)	
4	L1	Gillingham	3	1	0	0	2	1	4	−3	3	

Source: EFL.com
Notes:

7 September 2021 Group match 1	Colchester United	0–1	Gillingham	Colchester
19:30 BST		Report	McKenzie 90+3'	Stadium: Colchester Community Stadium; Attendance: 731; Referee: Brett Huxtable

28 September 2021 Group match 2	Colchester United	1–0	West Ham United U21	Colchester
19:30 BST	Dobra 7'	Report		Stadium: Colchester Community Stadium; Attendance: 962; Referee: David Rock

9 November 2021 Group match 3	Ipswich Town	0–0	Colchester United	Ipswich
19:45 GMT		Report		Stadium: Portman Road; Attendance: 8,100; Referee: Paul Howard
	Penalties
	Pigott (penalty missed); Chaplin (penalty scored); Harper (penalty scored); Celina (penalty scored); Aluko (penalty scored)		Sears (penalty missed); Chilvers (penalty scored); Hannant (penalty scored); Coxe (penalty scored); Cooper (penalty missed)

30 November 2021 Second round	Swindon Town	1–2	Colchester United	Swindon
19:45 GMT	Crichlow 45+1'; Francis (yellow card) 45+2'; Dabre (yellow card) 82'	Report	Chambers 6', 11'; Judge (yellow card) 14'; Smith (yellow card) 40'; Jasper (yellow card) 55'; McCoulsky (yellow card) 90+1'	Stadium: County Ground; Attendance: 1,728; Referee: Ben Toner

4 January 2022 Third round	Sutton United	2–1	Colchester United	Sutton
19:45 GMT	Turner 7' (o.g.); Wilson 52'; Kizzi (yellow card) 57'	Report	Dobra (yellow card) 34'; Sears 45'; Coxe (yellow card) 57'; Sarpong-Wiredu (yellow card) 57'	Stadium: Borough Sports Ground; Attendance: 977; Referee: Charles Breakspear

== Squad statistics ==
=== Appearances and goals ===
As of 5 November 2021

No.	Pos	Nat	Player	Total		League Two		FA Cup		EFL Cup		EFL Trophy	
No.	Pos	Nat	Player	Apps	Goals	Apps	Goals	Apps	Goals	Apps	Goals	Apps	Goals
1	GK	(England) ENG	Dean Gerken	1	0	0	0	0	0	0	0	1	0
2	DF	(England) ENG	Miles Welch-Hayes	8	0	5+1	0	0	0	1	0	0+1	0
3	DF	(England) ENG	Ryan Clampin	8	0	4+1	0	1	0	1	0	1	0
4	DF	(England) ENG	Luke Chambers	21	0	17	0	1	0	0	0	3	0
5	DF	(New Zealand) NZL	Tommy Smith	15	0	12+2	0	0	0	1	0	0	0
6	MF	(England) ENG	Brendan Sarpong-Wiredu	18	1	12+1	0	1	1	1	0	3	0
7	MF	(England) ENG	Luke Hannant	19	0	10+5	0	0+1	0	0	0	1+2	0
8	MF	(England) ENG	Cole Skuse	19	0	17	0	1	0	1	0	0	0
9	FW	(England) ENG	Frank Nouble	21	0	14+2	0	0+1	0	1	0	3	0
10	MF	(Republic of Ireland) IRL	Alan Judge	12	1	9+1	1	0	0	0+1	0	0+1	0
11	FW	(England) ENG	Freddie Sears	23	8	17+1	7	1	1	0+1	0	1+2	0
14	MF	(England) ENG	Noah Chilvers	22	3	11+6	3	1	0	1	0	3	0
15	FW	(England) ENG	Shawn McCoulsky	4	1	0+3	0	0+1	1	0	0	0	0
17	FW	(Bulgaria) BUL	Sylvester Jasper	19	3	9+6	2	1	1	1	0	1+1	0
18	DF	(England) ENG	Tom Eastman	19	1	10+4	1	1	0	1	0	3	0
19	FW	(Albania) ALB	Armando Dobra	11	2	5+3	1	1	0	0	0	2	1
21	MF	(England) ENG	Gene Kennedy	7	0	1+3	0	0	0	0+1	0	2	0
22	DF	(England) ENG	Junior Tchamadeu	9	0	4+1	0	1	0	0	0	3	0
23	DF	(England) ENG	Charlie Daniels	16	0	14+1	0	0	0	0	0	1	0
24	GK	(England) ENG	Jake Turner	5	0	2+1	0	0	0	0	0	2	0
27	DF	(Wales) WAL	Cameron Coxe	17	0	8+5	0	0+1	0	1	0	1+1	0
29	GK	(England) ENG	Shamal George	18	0	16	0	1	0	1	0	0	0
34	FW	(England) ENG	Samson Tovide	6	0	1+4	0	0	0	0	0	1	0
37	MF	(England) ENG	Chay Cooper	3	0	0	0	0+1	0	0	0	1+1	0
43	DF	(England) ENG	Harry Beadle	1	0	0	0	0	0	0	0	1	0

=== Goalscorers ===
Place	Number	Nation	Position	Name	League Two	FA Cup	EFL Cup	EFL Trophy	Total
1	11	(England)	ST	Freddie Sears	7	1	0	0	8
2	14	(England)	AM	Noah Chilvers	3	0	0	0	3
2	17	(Bulgaria)	FW	Sylvester Jasper	2	1	0	0	3
4	19	(Albania)	WG/AM	Armando Dobra	1	0	0	1	2
5	6	(England)	MF	Brendan Sarpong-Wiredu	0	1	0	0	1
5	10	(Republic of Ireland)	AM	Alan Judge	1	0	0	0	1
5	15	(England)	ST	Shawn McCoulsky	0	1	0	0	1
5	18	(England)	CB	Tom Eastman	1	0	0	0	1
				Own goals	1	0	0	0	1
				TOTALS	16	4	0	1	21

=== Disciplinary record ===
Number	Nationality	Position	Player	League Two		FA Cup		EFL Cup		EFL Trophy		Total	
Number	Nationality	Position	Player	Booked	Sent off (straight red)	Booked	Sent off (straight red)	Booked	Sent off (straight red)	Booked	Sent off (straight red)	Booked	Sent off (straight red)
6	(England)	MF	Brendan Sarpong-Wiredu	6	0	0	0	1	0	0	0	7	0
4	(England)	CB	Luke Chambers	3	1	0	0	0	0	0	0	3	1
22	(England)	RB	Junior Tchamadeu	2	1	0	0	0	0	1	0	3	1
14	(England)	AM	Noah Chilvers	4	0	0	0	0	0	0	0	4	0
8	(England)	DM	Cole Skuse	3	0	0	0	0	0	0	0	3	0
9	(England)	CF	Frank Nouble	2	0	1	0	0	0	0	0	3	0
17	(Bulgaria)	FW	Sylvester Jasper	3	0	0	0	0	0	0	0	3	0
34	(England)	CF	Samson Tovide	0	1	0	0	0	0	0	0	0	1
7	(England)	MF	Luke Hannant	2	0	0	0	0	0	0	0	2	0
19	(Albania)	WG/AM	Armando Dobra	2	0	0	0	0	0	0	0	2	0
27	(England)	DF	Cameron Coxe	1	0	0	0	0	0	1	0	2	0
29	(England)	GK	Shamal George	1	0	1	0	0	0	0	0	2	0
3	(England)	LB/LW	Ryan Clampin	1	0	0	0	0	0	0	0	1	0
2	(England)	RB	Miles Welch-Hayes	1	0	0	0	0	0	0	0	1	0
5	(New Zealand)	CB	Tommy Smith	1	0	0	0	0	0	0	0	1	0
18	(England)	CB	Tom Eastman	1	0	0	0	0	0	0	0	1	0
21	(England)	MF	Gene Kennedy	0	0	0	0	0	0	1	0	1	0
23	(England)	DF	Charlie Daniels	1	0	0	0	0	0	0	0	1	0
			TOTALS	34	3	2	0	1	0	3	0	40	3

=== Player debuts ===
Players making their first-team Colchester United debut in a fully competitive match.

Number	Position	Player	Date	Opponent	Ground	Notes
4	CB	(England) Luke Chambers	7 August 2021	Carlisle United	Brunton Park	
8	DM	(England) Cole Skuse	7 August 2021	Carlisle United	Brunton Park	
9	CF	(England) Frank Nouble	7 August 2021	Carlisle United	Brunton Park	(Note: Third debut for the club.)
10	AM	(Republic of Ireland) Alan Judge	7 August 2021	Carlisle United	Brunton Park	
11	ST	(England) Freddie Sears	7 August 2021	Carlisle United	Brunton Park	
17	FW	(England) Sylvester Jasper	7 August 2021	Carlisle United	Brunton Park	
27	DF	(Wales) Cameron Coxe	7 August 2021	Carlisle United	Brunton Park	
21	MF	(England) Gene Kennedy	10 August 2021	Birmingham City	St Andrew's	
7	MF	(England) Luke Hannant	14 August 2021	Northampton Town	Colchester Community Stadium	
23	DF	(England) Charlie Daniels	17 August 2021	Mansfield Town	Colchester Community Stadium	
19	WG/AM	(Albania) Armando Dobra	7 September 2021	Gillingham	Colchester Community Stadium	
24	GK	(England) Jake Turner	7 September 2021	Gillingham	Colchester Community Stadium	
43	DF	(England) Harry Beadle	7 September 2021	Gillingham	Colchester Community Stadium	
37	MF	(England) Chay Cooper	28 September 2021	West Ham United U21	Colchester Community Stadium	
15	ST	(England) Shawn McCoulsky	5 November 2021	AFC Sudbury	King's Marsh	

== See also ==
- List of Colchester United F.C. seasons
