= Arsenal Training Centre =

Football training centre

Sobha Realty Training Centre
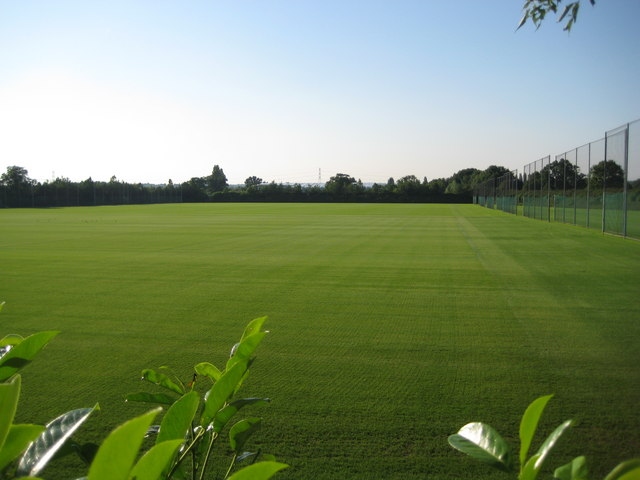
- A view of a pitch from the Watling Chase Timberland Trail public footpath.
- Interactive map of Sobha Realty Training Centre
- Location: London Colney, Hertfordshire
- Coordinates: 51°42′40″N 0°17′5″W
- Owner: Kroenke Sports & Entertainment
- Type: Football training ground

Construction
- Built: 1998–1999
- Opened: 11 October 1999
- Cost: £10 million

The Arsenal Training Centre, branded as the Sobha Realty Training Centre for sponsorship reasons, and often referred to by the synecdoche London Colney, is the training complex for Arsenal Football Club, located in London Colney in Hertfordshire. It houses ten full-size pitches, an indoor facility and a medical and rehabilitation centre.

Constructed after manager Arsène Wenger campaigned for Arsenal to replace its existing groundshare at University College London, it opened in October 1999 at a cost of £10 million, financed by the £22.5 million transfer of Nicolas Anelka to Real Madrid. The centre has received regular upgrades to its facilities since its opening.

Alongside accommodating Arsenal's first teams and youth teams, the centre acted as the training base for the England national football team before home internationals and friendlies from 2003 and 2012. It has attracted criticism from local residents over environmental and catchment issues.

== History and development ==
When Arsène Wenger joined Arsenal in October 1996, he attempted to organise an extra training session at University College London Union (UCLU) Sports Grounds in Shenley, for the benefit of getting to know his players. Wenger was told that the ground – owned by UCL, was reserved for its students, which left him not knowing "whether to laugh or cry". A few weeks after, a fire partially burnt down the training centre, causing £50,000 worth of damage. Arsenal temporarily rehoused their training base to the Sopwell House Hotel in St Albans. Wenger, dismayed by the arrangement, campaigned for a purpose-built, Arsenal-owned ground that housed the latest training equipment. This was one of the "important decisions" he wanted to make for the club – "Without an assurance of that freedom and control, I would not have stayed."

By February 1998, Hertsmere Borough Council had granted consent for Arsenal to build a training centre on greenfield land, adjacent to a local school, in the Bell Lane area, London Colney. It is situated adjacent to the former facilities at the Shenley UCLU Sports Grounds, which is now used by Watford Football Club as its training centre. They concluded it was "essential to support the training facility", that it would replace an existing building used by the club and that Arsenal's community work "constituted exceptional circumstances". The plans were referred to the Environment Secretary John Prescott, who ratified it, in spite of the site being within the green belt. Planning permission was obtained in September 1998.

Richard Marshall and Dearle & Henderson designed the training ground and its facilities. Wenger was "heavily involved" in the process – "even down to the kitchens" and shared ideas from his time as Nagoya Grampus manager, when the club itself was building its own training centre. As part of a fact-finding mission, club representatives visited other training facilities around Europe, such as Bayern Munich and Auxerre. Arsenal's physiotherapist Gary Lewin and fitness coach Tony Colbert were involved in their respective areas. The project, transforming a 140-acre site, was completed in 45 weeks at a cost of £10 million. Arsenal financed this through the transfer of Nicolas Anelka to Real Madrid for £22.5 million in August 1999.

The Arsenal Training Centre was opened by Sports Minister Kate Hoey on 11 October 1999. Chairman Peter Hill-Wood described it as "simply superb", while Wenger felt it acted as a "big attraction" for players to come to Arsenal. Unlike before, the training centre was open to the first team squad and youth teams for training simultaneously, which in Wenger's words gave Arsenal a "stronger feeling of togetherness". The club have since expanded the training centre to include a press briefing building and indoor pitches. During development work in August 2006, an artillery shell was found near the site which led to the surrounding area being evacuated. In February 2024, Arsenal announced the club sold the naming rights of the centre to Dubai-based real estate company Sobha: it has since become known as the Sobha Realty Training Centre.

== Facilities ==
The training centre covers an area of 143 acres (0.58 km^{2}). In all, there are ten full-size pitches at the site. Inside the complex, there are training and rehabilitation areas, physiotherapy and massage rooms and remedial and hydrotherapy pools. There are also squash/basketball courts, sauna, steam and weight rooms, a restaurant for staff and players, conference rooms, offices, classrooms and a TV studio to interview players and staff for Arsenal TV.

All ten pitches have undersoil drainage and an automated sprinkler system. In addition, two have undersoil heating. Each pitch is built to match the playing surface specifications of the Emirates Stadium. Three of the pitches are reserved for the Arsenal youth team, three for the reserves and three for the first team. The tenth pitch is where first team friendlies and Under-18 league fixtures take place.

A medical and rehabilitation centre was completed in October 2011, tailored to meet the needs of the Arsenal players. The centre houses apparatus such as an anti-gravity treadmill and a range of screening equipment. Players returning from injury are able to focus on their rehabilitation "in a separate, specialised space", with medical staff on hand. Extra training pitches are also set to be laid. In February 2015, Arsenal installed 1,400 m2 of artificial grass for some pitches at the centre, ordered from Tisca Tiara.

In March 2015, Arsenal announced plans for a major redevelopment of its training centre. The plans included expanding and upgrading the main building, constructing a player performance centre, and refurbishing the visitors, educational and media centre. Specific gym improvements include new 40m running tracks. New offices and meeting rooms were to be built for the scouting team, academy staff, and data analysis personnel. Upgraded training medical and training facilities include a spa, a cryochamber, and ice baths. The project was supported by the Sport England with planning approval given by the Hertsmere borough council planning committee. These developments were completed by the beginning of the 2017–18 season.

== Criticism ==
The ground has attracted criticism from local residents. A parish council meeting in October 2001 revealed that Arsenal players had not been involved with local initiatives, despite claims during its planning phase that the ground would allow the club to develop links with the local community. Shenley Primary School reportedly failed to receive any visits from players despite repeated requests. The club responded by pointing to initiatives by its Ladies team to organise competitions at local grounds. Plans to develop new buildings and road links to the site were challenged by residents four years later; they believed it would lead to increased traffic and noise pollution in the area.

In March 2006, The Daily Telegraph noted Arsenal's failure to develop young English players following a UEFA Champions League tie against Juventus, in which they did not use a single English player. According to desk research, youth team opportunities was a main reason the club obtained planning permission for the centre. Arsenal cited in a statement: "The Bell Lane site is within the Arsenal 'catchment area' and the club already has a very active youth policy in the area. In particular, the club currently works closely with 12 local clubs which would be maintained and enhanced if the Bell Lane proposal were to go ahead."

== Other uses ==
The England national football team frequently trained at the ground when preparing for games in London; the agreement with Arsenal began in March 2003. They have since 2012 relocated their training base to St George's Park National Football Centre. Arsenal's training ground was used by the national team in November 2013, for the friendlies against Chile and Germany after St George's Park reported a stomach bug.

For the UEFA Champions League final at Wembley Stadium in 2011, Barcelona used the centre's facilities to train. NFL side St. Louis Rams trained at London Colney in preparation for the 2012 NFL International Series in London.

In November 2009, the ground held a tournament between teams of colleagues from eight local organisations, which raised £1,500 for charity.
