= 2023–24 Portimonense S.C. season =

Portimonense S.C.
2023–24 season
- Manager: Paulo Sérgio
- Stadium: Estádio Municipal de Portimão
- Primeira Liga: 11th
- Taça de Portugal: Fourth round
- Taça da Liga: Second round
- Top goalscorer: League: Carlinhos (4); All: Carlinhos (6)
- Biggest win: Sporting da Covilhã 1–4 Portimonense
- Biggest defeat: Gil Vicente 5–0 Portimonense; Braga 6–1 Portimonense
Home colours	Away colours

The 2023–24 season is Portimonense S.C.'s 110th season in existence and seventh consecutive in the Primeira Liga. They also competed in the Taça de Portugal and Taça da Liga.

== Players ==
=== First-team squad ===
As of 26 September 2023

Note: Flags indicate national team as defined under FIFA eligibility rules; some limited exceptions apply. Players may hold more than one non-FIFA nationality.

No.	Pos.	Nation	Player
1	GK	BRA	Gabriel Souza (on loan from Bahia)
6	MF	POR	Ricardo Sousa
7	FW	BUL	Sylvester Jasper
8	MF	BRA	Maurício
9	FW	POR	Paulinho (on loan from Viborg)
11	MF	BRA	Carlinhos (captain)
12	GK	BRA	Vinícius Silvestre
13	MF	BRA	Dener
14	DF	SEN	Moustapha Seck
17	MF	BRA	Davis Silva
18	DF	POR	Gonçalo Costa
19	FW	ECU	Ronie Carrillo
20	MF	POR	Paulo Estrela
22	DF	POR	Filipe Relvas
23	DF	KOR	Lee Ye-chan
25	MF	BRA	Lucas Ventura

No.	Pos.	Nation	Player
27	DF	POR	Guga
28	FW	BRA	Luan Campos (on loan from América Mineiro)
30	FW	KOR	Kim Yong-hak
32	GK	JPN	Kosuke Nakamura
33	DF	BRA	Igor Formiga
37	FW	BRA	Rildo (on loan from Santa Clara)
43	DF	BRA	Tornich
44	DF	BRA	Pedrão
71	MF	ENG	Dennis Adeniran
75	DF	POR	Ângelo Taveira
76	DF	POR	Rafael Alcobia
77	FW	CPV	Hélio Varela
85	FW	GBS	Midana Cassamá
88	GK	BRA	João Victor
99	MF	BRA	Zinho (on loan from Grêmio)

=== Other players under contract ===
Note: Flags indicate national team as defined under FIFA eligibility rules; some limited exceptions apply. Players may hold more than one non-FIFA nationality.

No.	Pos.	Nation	Player
10	MF	BRA	Luquinha

=== Out on loan ===
Note: Flags indicate national team as defined under FIFA eligibility rules; some limited exceptions apply. Players may hold more than one non-FIFA nationality.

No.	Pos.	Nation	Player
13	FW	JPN	Shuhei Kawasaki (to Vissel Kobe until 31 December 2023)
24	MF	FRA	Mohamed Diaby (to Sheffield Wednesday until 30 June 2024)
35	FW	HON	Bryan Róchez (to União Leiria until 30 June 2024)
39	FW	COL	Wilinton Aponzá (to Chungnam Asan until 30 June 2024)
70	FW	POR	Rui Gomes (to Tondela until 30 June 2024)
99	FW	BRA	Yago Cariello (to Gangwon until 30 June 2024)
—	GK	BRA	Matheus Nogueira (to Paysandu until 31 December 2023)
—	DF	BRA	Pedro Casagrande (to Covilhã until 30 June 2024)

No.	Pos.	Nation	Player
—	MF	POR	Bruno Reis (to Covilhã until 30 June 2024)
—	MF	BRA	Ewerton (to Vegalta Sendai until 31 December 2023)
—	MF	BRA	Felipe Dini (to Belenenses until 30 June 2024)
—	MF	BRA	Gustavo Klismahn (to Santa Clara until 30 June 2024)
—	MF	BRA	Rômulo (to Criciúma until 31 December 2023)
—	FW	NGR	Adewale Sapara (to Farense until 30 June 2024)
—	FW	POR	Ricardo Matos (to Belenenses until 30 June 2024)

== Transfers ==
=== In ===
Pos.	Player	Transferred from	Fee	Date	Source
MF	(Brazil) Rildo	(Portugal) Santa Clara	Loan	1 July 2023	
GK	(Brazil) Vinícius	(Brazil) Palmeiras	€1,500,000	6 July 2023	
FW	(Ecuador) Ronie Carrillo	(Ecuador) El Nacional	Undisclosed	14 July 2023	
MF	(Japan) Taichi Fukui	(Germany) Bayern Munich II	Loan	31 January 2024	

=== Out ===
Pos.	Player	Transferred to	Fee	Date	Source
MF	(Brazil) Lucas Fernandes	(Brazil) Botafogo	€4,000,000	1 July 2023	
DF	(Morocco) Fahd Moufi	(Croatia) Hajduk Split	Free	11 July 2023	
DF	(Brazil) Wagner Leonardo	(Brazil) Vitória	Free	1 August 2023	

== Pre-season and friendlies ==
Win Draw Loss Fixtures

12 July 2023 Friendly	Portimonense (Portugal)	0–0	(Scotland) Celtic	Quinta do Lago
18:00				Stadium: The Campus

15 July 2023 Friendly	Portimonense (Portugal)	1–4	(Scotland) Celtic	Quinta do Lago
11:00				Stadium: The Campus

19 July 2023 Friendly	Portimonense (Portugal)	1–2	(Portugal) Porto	Quinta do Lago
19:00				Stadium: The Campus

25 July 2023 Friendly	Sporting CP (Portugal)	1–1	(Portugal) Portimonense	Lagos
11:00				Stadium: Cascade Resort Lagos - Campo 1

5 August 2023 Friendly	Portimonense (Portugal)	1–2	(Portugal) Farense	Portimão
10:00				Stadium: Estádio Municipal de Portimão

== Competitions ==
=== Overall record ===
Competition	First match	Last match	Starting round	Final position	Record							
Competition	First match	Last match	Starting round	Final position	Pld	W	D	L	GF	GA	GD	Win %
Primeira Liga	16 August 2023	19 May 2024	Matchday 1		22	6	4	12	24	45	−21	27.27
Taça de Portugal	20 October 2023	25 November 2023	Third round	Fourth round	2	1	0	1	5	5	+0	50.00
Taça da Liga	23 July 2023	30 July 2023	First round	Second round	2	1	1	0	3	1	+2	50.00
Total					26	8	5	13	32	51	−19	30.77

Last updated: 17 February 2024
Source: Soccerway

=== Primeira Liga ===
==== League table ====
Pos	Team	Pld	W	D	L	GF	GA	GD	Pts	Qualification or relegation
14	Estrela da Amadora	34	7	12	15	33	53	−20	33 (Note: Head-to-head away goals scored: Estoril 1, Estrela da Amadora 0.)	
15	Boavista	34	7	11	16	39	62	−23	32 (Note: Head-to-head points: Boavista 4, Portimonense 1.)	
16	Portimonense (R)	34	8	8	18	39	72	−33	32	Qualification for the relegation play-offs
17	Vizela (R)	34	5	11	18	36	66	−30	26	Relegation to Liga Portugal 2
18	Chaves (R)	34	5	8	21	31	72	−41	23	Relegation to Liga Portugal 2

Source: Liga Portugal
Rules for classification: 1) Points; 2) Head-to-head points; 3) Head-to-head goal difference; 4) Head-to-head away goals scored; 5) Goal difference; 6) Matches won; 7) Goals scored; 8) Play-off.
(R) Relegated

==== Results summary ====
Overall								Home						Away					
Pld	W	D	L	GF	GA	GD	Pts	W	D	L	GF	GA	GD	W	D	L	GF	GA	GD
20	6	4	10	24	45	−21	22	3	3	5	11	17	−6	3	1	5	13	28	−15

Last updated: 17 February 2024.
Source: Superliga

==== Results by round ====
Round	1	2	3	4	5	6	7	8	9	10	11	12	13	14	15	16	17	18	19	20	21	22
Ground	A	H	A	H	A	H	A	A	H	A	H	A	H	A	H	A	H	H	A	H	A	H
Result	L	L	D	D	W	L	W	L	W	L	W	L	D	L	L	L	W	L	W	L	L	D
Position	18	18	17	17	13	16	11	12	10	11	10	10	11	12	15	16	12	14	11	13	15	

Updated to match(es) played on 17 February 2024. Source: Superliga
A = Away; H = Home; W = Win; D = Draw; L = Loss

==== Matches ====
The league fixtures were unveiled on 5 July 2023.

28 January 2024 19	Boavista	1–4	Portimonense	Porto
15:30 WET	Sasso (yellow card) 34'; Makouta 67'; Abascal (yellow card) 75'		Hélio Varela 18' (yellow card) 72'; Jasper 25'; Carlinhos 35'; Dener (yellow card) 83'; Luan Campos 90+5'	Stadium: Estádio do Bessa; Attendance: 6,917; Referee: Bruno Pires Costa

3 February 2024 20	Portimonense	1–2	Arouca	Portimão
15:30	Carrillo 71'		Mújica 48'; Rocha 52'	Stadium: Estádio Municipal de Portimão; Referee: David Silva

9 February 2024 21	Estrela	3–0	Portimonense	Amadora
20:15	Carlinhos 6' (o.g.); Léo Jabá 13'; Nakamura 25' (o.g.)			Stadium: Estádio José Gomes; Referee: Fábio Veríssimo

17 February 2024 22	Portimonense	1–1	Vitória de Guimarães	Portimão
18:00	Guga 79'		Silva 20'	Stadium: Estádio Municipal de Portimão

=== Taça de Portugal ===
v	Portimonense

=== Taça da Liga ===
v	Portimonense
