= Shamal George =

Footballer (born 1998)

Personal information
- Full name: Shamal Tyrell George
- Date of birth: 6 January 1998 (age 28)
- Place of birth: Birkenhead, England
- Height: 1.91 m (6 ft 3 in)
- Position: Goalkeeper

Team information
- Current team: Bromley
- Number: 30

Youth career
- Manor
- 2009–2017: Liverpool

Senior career*
Years	Team	Apps	(Gls)
2017–2020	Liverpool	0	(0)
2017	→ Carlisle United (loan)	4	(0)
2018–2019	→ Tranmere Rovers (loan)	0	(0)
2019–2020	→ Marine (loan)	13	(0)
2020–2022	Colchester United	45	(0)
2022–2024	Livingston	67	(0)
2024–2026	Wycombe Wanderers	0	(0)
2025–2026	→ St Mirren (loan)	33	(0)
2026–	Bromley	6	(0)

International career^{‡}
2026–	Dominica	1	(0)
- * Club domestic league appearances and goals as of 11:21, 22 November 2026 (UTC) ‡ National team caps and goals as of 13 November 2026

Shamal Tyrell George (born 6 January 1998) is a professional footballer who plays as a goalkeeper for Bromley. Born in England, he represents Dominica at international level.

== Career ==
=== Liverpool ===
Born in Birkenhead, George signed for Liverpool in 2009 after playing for Manor. He joined Liverpool's first team in the summer of 2016 for pre-season, appearing out of position as a striker in a friendly match against Huddersfield Town, after Liverpool manager Jürgen Klopp had used all the remaining substitutes.

He then immediately joined Carlisle United on loan to gain first-team experience. He made his professional debut on 29 August 2017 in an EFL Trophy match, and made his Football League debut for the club on 12 September in a match against Coventry City.

In July 2018 he signed an extension to his contract with Liverpool, and joined Tranmere Rovers on loan until January 2019. In March 2019, George and his brother were attacked outside a bar in Liverpool.

On 31 August 2019, he was loaned to Marine He returned to Liverpool in January 2020 on completion of his loan, having made 16 appearances for Marine.

He was released by Liverpool at the end of the 2019–20 season.

=== Colchester United ===
On 28 August 2020, George signed for League Two club Colchester United on a two-year deal. He made his Colchester debut in their 2–0 EFL Trophy defeat to Portsmouth on 8 September. He made his league debut for the club as a substitute for Dean Gerken in Colchester's 1–0 home defeat to Scunthorpe United on 29 January 2021. On 3 May 2022, George was named the Colchester United Player of the Year for the 2021–22 season, also winning the CUSA Player of the Year Award. The club exercised a contract extension for George in May 2022.

=== Livingston ===
On 23 July 2022, George signed for Scottish Premiership side Livingston for an undisclosed fee, and was introduced to Livingston fans ahead of their Scottish League Cup match against Kelty Hearts the same day.

=== Wycombe Wanderers ===
On 30 August 2024, George signed for EFL League One club Wycombe Wanderers after a release clause was met.

=== St. Mirren ===
On 24 July 2025, George joined Scottish Premiership club St Mirren on a season-long loan deal. He won the first trophy of his career when he helped the Buddies defeat Celtic 3-1 in the Scottish League Cup final on 14 December.

=== Bromley ===
In July 2026 he signed for Bromley.

== International career ==
In November 2026, George earned his first call-up for the Dominica national football team. He made his debut in a 4-2 defeat to Puerto Rico on 13 November.

== Personal life ==
In March 2019, George and his brother were attacked outside a bar in Liverpool. The attacker fled the country, before being sentenced to 18 months in prison in April 2024.

== Career statistics ==
As of match played 21 November 2026

Appearances and goals by club, season and competition
Club	Season	League			National cup (Note: Includes FA Cup, Scottish Cup)		League cup (Note: Includes EFL Cup, Scottish League Cup)		Other		Total	
Club	Season	Division	Apps	Goals	Apps	Goals	Apps	Goals	Apps	Goals	Apps	Goals
Liverpool	2017–18	Premier League	0	0	0	0	0	0	0	0	0	0
Liverpool	2018–19	Premier League	0	0	0	0	0	0	0	0	0	0
Liverpool	2019–20	Premier League	0	0	0	0	0	0	0	0	0	0
Liverpool	Total		0	0	0	0	0	0	0	0	0	0
Carlisle United (loan)	2017–18	League Two	4	0	0	0	0	0	3 (Note: Appearances in EFL Trophy)	0	7	0
Tranmere Rovers (loan)	2018–19	League Two	0	0	0	0	1	0	2	0	3	0
Marine (loan)	2019–20	Northern Premier League	13	0	1	0	–		1 (Note: Appearance in NPL League Challenge Cup)	0	15	0
Colchester United	2020–21	League Two	15	0	0	0	0	0	3	0	18	0
Colchester United	2021–22	League Two	30	0	1	0	1	0	0	0	32	0
Colchester United	Total		45	0	1	0	1	0	3	0	50	0
Livingston	2022–23	Scottish Premiership	32	0	2	0	1	0	–		35	0
Livingston	2023–24	Scottish Premiership	32	0	1	0	5	0	–		38	0
Livingston	2024–25	Scottish Championship	3	0	0	0	4	0	0	0	7	0
Livingston	Total		67	0	3	0	10	0	0	0	80	0
Wycombe Wanderers	2024–25	League One	0	0	3	0	0	0	2	0	5	0
Wycombe Wanderers	2025–26	League One	0	0	0	0	0	0	0	0	0	0
Wycombe Wanderers	Total		0	0	3	0	0	0	2	0	5	0
St Mirren (loan)	2025–26	Scottish Premiership	33	0	3	0	5	0	–		41	0
Bromley	2026–27	League One	6	0	1	0	1	0	0	0	8	0
Career total			167	0	12	0	18	0	11	0	209	0

=== International ===
As of 13 November 2026

Dominica
Year	Apps	Goals
2026	1	0
Total	1	0

== Honours ==
St Mirren

- Scottish League Cup: 2025–26

Individual

- Colchester United Player of the Year: 2021–22
