= Sylvester Jasper =

English-Bulgarian footballer

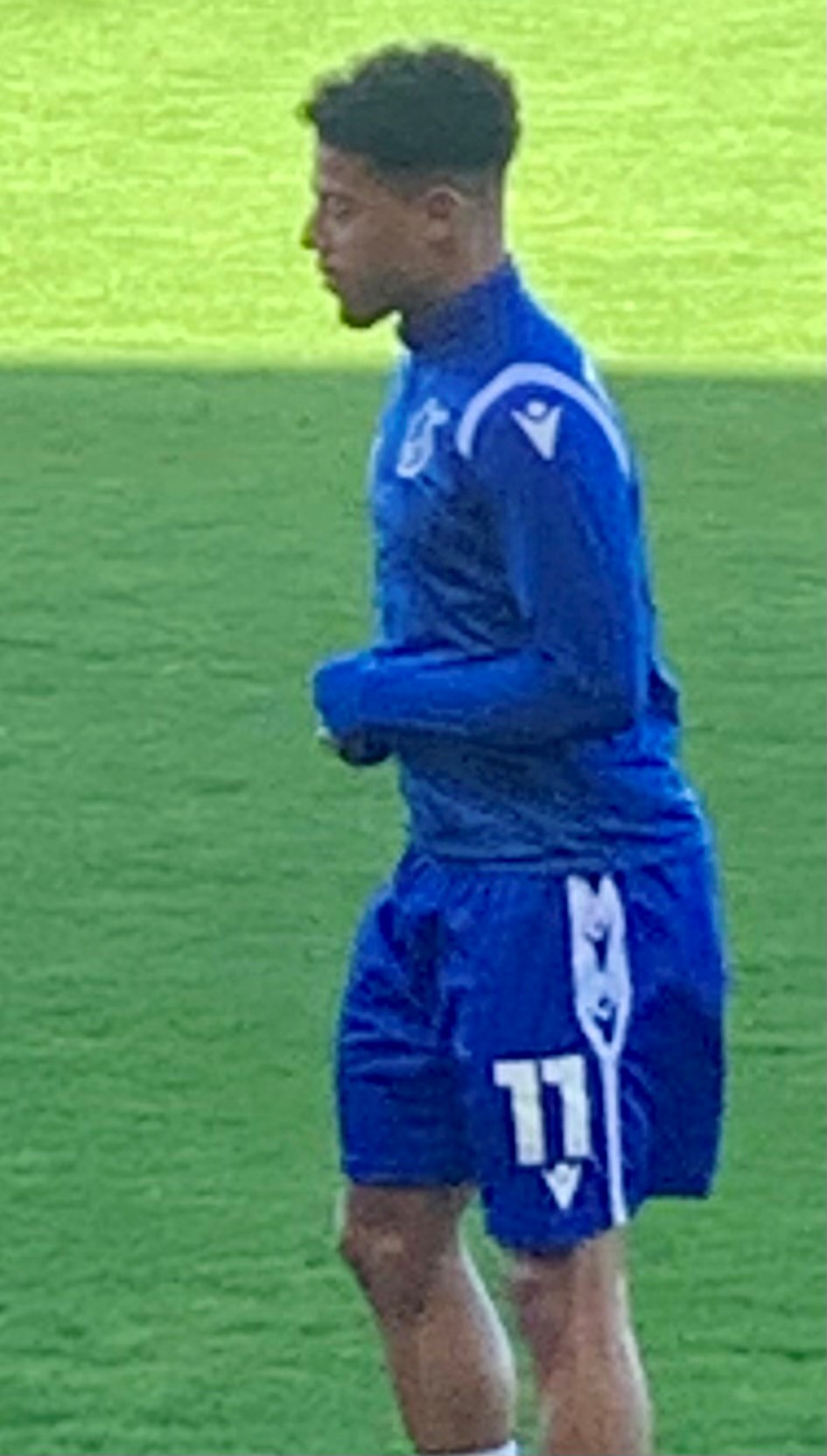
- Jasper at Bristol Rovers F.C. on loan in 2022.

Personal information
- Full name: Sylvester Alexander Enitombra Jasper
- Date of birth: 13 September 2001 (age 25)
- Place of birth: Southwark, London, England
- Height: 1.80 m (5 ft 11 in)
- Position: Forward

Team information
- Current team: Standard Liège
- Number: 19

Youth career
- 2009: Marek Dupnitsa
- 2010–2012: Queens Park Rangers
- 2012–2020: Fulham

Senior career*
| Years | Team | Apps | (Gls) |
| 2020–2023 | Fulham | 2 | (0) |
| 2021–2022 | → Colchester United (loan) | 18 | (2) |
| 2022 | → Hibernian (loan) | 13 | (0) |
| 2022 | → Bristol Rovers (loan) | 6 | (0) |
| 2023–2024 | Portimonense | 25 | (2) |
| 2024–2025 | Śląsk Wrocław | 19 | (0) |
| 2025–2026 | Železničar Pančevo | 33 | (7) |
| 2026– | Standard Liège | 1 | (0) |

International career
| 2016 | England U15 | 2 | (0) |
| 2017 | England U16 | 2 | (1) |
| 2021–2022 | Bulgaria U21 | 4 | (0) |
- * Club domestic league appearances and goals as of 22:26, 19 August 2026 (UTC)

Sylvester Alexander Enitombra Jasper (Bulgarian: Силвестър Александър Енитомбра Джаспър; born 13 September 2001) is a professional footballer who plays as a forward for Belgian Pro League club Standard Liège. Born in England, he represented both his country of birth and Bulgaria at youth level.

== Club career ==
Jasper started his youth career at Bulgarian side Marek Dupnitsa at the age of 8, where he trained for a few weeks, as he says in one interview, because of his uncle, an ex-Marek player. Moving back to England, he joined Queens Park Rangers aged 9 and switched to Fulham 2 years later. In January 2020 he made his professional debut for the team in a FA Cup match against Manchester City. On 25 August 2020, Jasper signed his first professional contract with Fulham.

On 4 August 2021, Jasper joined League Two side Colchester United on loan until January 2022. He made his debut from the bench on 7 August in Colchester's 0–0 draw with Carlisle United.

On 31 January 2022, Jasper joined Scottish club Hibernian on loan for the rest of the season, which included an option to buy at the end of the season. Jasper made 16 appearances for Hibs during the loan, but they declined the option to sign him permanently.

On 1 September 2022, Jasper signed for League One club Bristol Rovers on loan for the 2022–23 season. He made his debut two days later as a second-half substitute in a 2–2 draw with Morecambe. After being left out of the squad for a 2–2 draw against Plymouth Argyle, Rovers manager Joey Barton announced that Jasper was returning to Fulham due to him being unhappy with the amount of game time he has been given.

On 5 April 2023, Jasper agreed to join Primeira Liga club Portimonense with the two clubs having agreed upon a compensation fee.

On 2 October 2024, Jasper, now a free agent, signed a two-year deal with Ekstraklasa club Śląsk Wrocław with an option for another year.

On 3 July 2025, Jasper joined Serbian SuperLiga side Železničar Pančevo on a two-year contract following the mutual termination of his contract with Śląsk Wrocław.

After few days of speculation, on 31 July 2026 Jasper signed for Belgian Pro League club Standard Liège until June 2029.

== International career ==
Jasper was born in England to a Nigerian father and a Bulgarian mother, making him eligible to represent the three countries internationally. In 2016 he represented England at the under-15 level.

On 2 November 2021, Jasper received his first call-up to the Bulgarian under-21 side for 2023 UEFA European Under-21 Championship qualification matches against the Netherlands under-21 and Moldova under-21 sides. He made his debut for the team in the match against the Netherlands.

== Personal life ==
He attended St Richard Reynolds Roman Catholic College in Twickenham from 2013 to 2017.

His mother is Bulgarian originating from Dupnitsa, and his father is Nigerian who had lived and studied in Bulgaria. Jasper's family has ties to football, with his maternal great-uncle being the legendary Marek player Sasho Pargov.

== Career statistics ==
As of match played 16 May 2025

Appearances and goals by club, season and competition
| Club | Season | League | | | National cup (Note: Includes FA Cup, Taça de Portugal, Polish Cup) | | League cup (Note: Includes EFL Cup, Taça da Liga) | | Other | | Total | |
| Club | Season | Division | Apps | Goals | Apps | Goals | Apps | Goals | Apps | Goals | Apps | Goals |
|---|---|---|---|---|---|---|---|---|---|---|---|---|
| Fulham U23 | 2019–20 | — | | | | | | | 2 (Note: Appearance(s) in EFL Trophy) | 0 | 2 | 0 |
| Fulham | 2019–20 | Championship | 2 | 0 | 1 | 0 | 0 | 0 | 0 | 0 | 3 | 0 |
| Fulham | 2020–21 | Premier League | 0 | 0 | 0 | 0 | 0 | 0 | 0 | 0 | 0 | 0 |
| Fulham | Total | | 2 | 0 | 1 | 0 | 0 | 0 | 0 | 0 | 3 | 0 |
| Colchester United (loan) | 2021–22 | League Two | 18 | 2 | 2 | 1 | 1 | 0 | 3 | 0 | 24 | 3 |
| Hibernian (loan) | 2021–22 | Scottish Premiership | 13 | 0 | 3 | 0 | 0 | 0 | — | | 16 | 0 |
| Bristol Rovers (loan) | 2022–23 | League One | 6 | 0 | 0 | 0 | 2 | 0 | — | | 8 | 0 |
| Portimonense | 2023–24 | Primeira Liga | 24 | 2 | 2 | 0 | 2 | 0 | 1 (Note: Appearance in Primeira Liga relegation play-offs) | 0 | 29 | 2 |
| Portimonense | 2024–25 | Liga Portugal 2 | 1 | 0 | 0 | 0 | 0 | 0 | — | | 1 | 0 |
| Portimonense | Total | | 25 | 2 | 2 | 0 | 2 | 0 | 1 | 0 | 30 | 2 |
| Śląsk Wrocław | 2024–25 | Ekstraklasa | 19 | 0 | 2 | 0 | — | | — | | 21 | 0 |
| Career total | | | 83 | 4 | 10 | 1 | 5 | 0 | 6 | 0 | 104 | 5 |
