= Hélio Varela =

Cape Verdean footballer (born 2002)

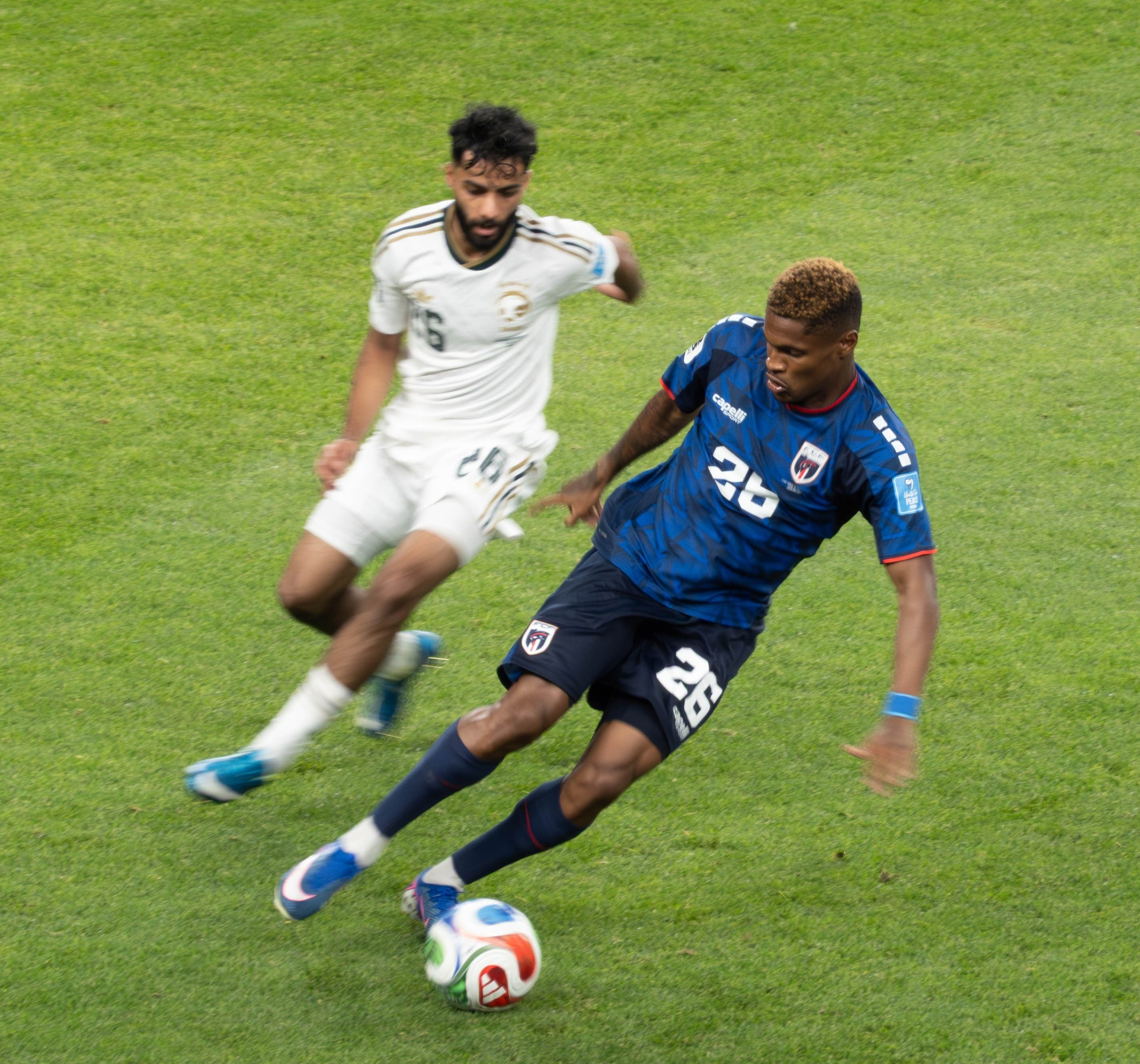
- Varela at the Fifa World Cup 2026, Cabo Verde vs Saudi Arabia

Personal information
- Full name: Hélio Sandro Oliveira Alves Varela
- Date of birth: 3 May 2002 (age 24)
- Place of birth: Almada, Portugal
- Height: 1.76 m (5 ft 9 in)
- Position: Winger

Team information
- Current team: Maccabi Tel Aviv
- Number: 29

Youth career
- 2010–2012: Monte Caparica
- 2012–2014: Charneca Caparica
- 2014–2018: Vitória Setúbal
- 2018–2020: Cova da Piedade

Senior career*
Years	Team	Apps	(Gls)
2020–2021	Amora	8	(0)
2021–2022	Sintrense	26	(5)
2022–2024	Portimonense	34	(6)
2024–2025	Gent	13	(0)
2025–	Maccabi Tel Aviv	30	(3)

International career^{‡}
2023–	Cape Verde	24	(1)
- * Club domestic league appearances and goals as of 21:28, 20 May 2026 (UTC) ‡ National team caps and goals as of 4 July 2026

Hélio Sandro Oliveira Alves Varela (Portuguese: [ˈɛ.li.u ˈsɐ̃.dɾu o.li.ˈvej.ɾɐ ˈal.vɨʒ vɐ.ˈɾɛ.lɐ]; born 3 May 2002) is a professional footballer who plays as a winger for Israeli Premier League club Maccabi Tel Aviv. Born in Portugal, Varela plays for the Cape Verde national team.

== Club career ==
Varela is a youth product of Monte Caparica, Charneca Caparica, Vitória Setúbal and Cova da Piedade. He began his senior career with Amora in 2020, before joining Sintrense for the 2021–22 Liga 3 season. He moved to the reserves of Portimonense in the summer of 2022. He made his professional debut with them in a 0–0 (5–4) Taça da Liga penalty shootout loss to Leixões on 30 July 2023. He scored his first league goal in a 1–1 Primeira Liga tie with Arouca on 26 August 2023.

On 16 August 2024, Varela joined Gent. On 30 October, Varela made his debut with Gent in the Croky Cup against Union Rochefortoise, he immediately scored 2 goals.

== International career ==
Born in Portugal, Varela is of Cape Verdean descent. He was called up to the Cape Verde national team for a set of friendlies in October 2023. He debuted with Cape Verde as a substitute in a 5–1 friendly loss to Algeria on 12 October 2023.

On 18 May 2026, he was called up by Cape Verde's head coach Bubista for the 2026 FIFA World Cup.

== Career statistics ==
=== Club ===
As of match played 20 May 2026

Appearances and goals by club, season and competition
Club	Season	League			National cup		League cup		Europe		Other		Total	
Club	Season	Division	Apps	Goals	Apps	Goals	Apps	Goals	Apps	Goals	Apps	Goals	Apps	Goals
Amora	2020–21	Campeonato de Portugal	8	0	1	0	—		—		—		9	0
Sintrense	2021–22	Campeonato de Portugal	26	5	1	0	—		—		—		27	5
Portimonense	2023–24	Primeira Liga	33	6	1	0	1	0	—		2 (Note: Appearances in relegation play-offs)	0	37	6
Portimonense	2023–24	Liga Portugal 2	1	0	0	0	—		—		—		1	0
Portimonense	Total		34	6	1	0	1	0	—		2	0	38	6
Gent	2024–25	Belgian Pro League	10	0	1	2	—		4 (Note: Appearances in UEFA Conference League)	0	—		15	2
Gent	2025–26	Belgian Pro League	3	0	0	0	—		0	0	—		3	0
Gent	Total		13	0	1	2	—		4	0	—		18	2
Maccabi Tel Aviv	2025–26	Israeli Premier League	30	3	4	3	—		8 (Note: Appearances in UEFA Europa League)	0	—		42	6
Career total			111	13	8	5	1	0	12	0	2	0	132	18

=== International ===
As of match played 3 July 2026

Appearances and goals by national team and year
National team	Year	Apps	Goals
Cape Verde	2023	4	0
Cape Verde	2024	10	0
Cape Verde	2025	5	0
Cape Verde	2026	5	1
Total		24	1

As of match played 21 June 2026. Cape Verde's score listed first, score column indicates score after each Varela goal.

List of international goals scored by Hélio Varela
No.	Date	Venue	Cap	Opponent	Score	Result	Competition
1	21 June 2026	Hard Rock Stadium, Miami Gardens, United States	21	Uruguay	2–2	2–2	2026 FIFA World Cup
