= Tisca Tiara =

Swiss textile company

Tisca Tiara is a textile company based in Bühler in Switzerland. They make textile floor coverings, curtains, upholstery, decorative fabrics and artificial turf for sports use.

In February 2015, Arsenal F.C. ordered 1,400 m^{2} of artificial grass from them for their training pitch at the Arsenal Training Centre.
