= Harry Beadle =

English footballer (born 2003)

Personal information
- Full name: Harry Alfie Beadle
- Date of birth: 7 January 2003 (age 23)
- Place of birth: London, England
- Position: Defender

Team information
- Current team: Bishop's Stortford (on loan from Colchester United)

Youth career
- –2021: Charlton Athletic

Senior career*
Years	Team	Apps	(Gls)
2021–	Colchester United	0	(0)
2022–2023	→ Bishop's Stortford (loan)	22	(2)
2023	→ Braintree Town (loan)	4	(1)
2023–	→ Bishop's Stortford (loan)	17	(0)
- * Club domestic league appearances and goals as of 16:33, 11 February 2024 (UTC)

Harry Alfie Beadle (born 7 January 2003) is an English professional footballer who plays as a defender for Dover Athletic F.C. signing from Aveley F.C.

== Career ==
Beadle progressed through the Academy at Charlton Athletic prior to signing a professional contract with Colchester United on 4 June 2021. He made his professional debut on 7 September 2021, starting in Colchester's EFL Trophy match against Gillingham.

He spent the 2022–23 campaign on loan at Bishop's Stortford, winning promotion to the National League North following title success before joining Braintree Town in July 2023, signing on a short-term basis. In October 2023, he returned to Bishop's Stortford on an initial one-month loan deal.

== Career statistics ==
As of match played 3 February 2024

Appearances and goals by club, season and competition
Club	Season	League			FA Cup		League Cup		Other		Total	
Club	Season	Division	Apps	Goals	Apps	Goals	Apps	Goals	Apps	Goals	Apps	Goals
Colchester United	2021–22	League Two	0	0	0	0	0	0	1 (Note: Appearance in EFL Trophy)	0	1	0
Colchester United	2022–23	League Two	0	0	—		0	0	0	0	0	0
Colchester United	2023–24	League Two	0	0	0	0	0	0	1	0	1	0
Colchester United	Total		0	0	0	0	0	0	2	0	2	0
Bishop's Stortford (loan)	2022–23	Isthmian League Premier Division	22	2	1	0	—		3 (Note: Appearances in FA Trophy)	0	26	2
Braintree Town (loan)	2023–24	National League South	4	1	0	0	—		—		4	1
Bishop's Stortford (loan)	2023–24	National League North	17	0	—		—		2	0	19	0
Career total			43	3	1	0	0	0	7	0	51	2

== Honours ==
Bishop's Stortford

- Isthmian League Premier Division: 2022–23
