= Taichi Fukui =

Japanese footballer

Taichi Fukui 福井 太智
Personal information
- Full name: Taichi Fukui
- Date of birth: 15 July 2004 (age 22)
- Place of birth: Kanagawa, Japan
- Height: 1.77 m (5 ft 10 in)
- Position: Midfielder

Team information
- Current team: Arouca
- Number: 8

Youth career
- Kurihama FC
- –2022: Sagan Tosu

Senior career*
Years	Team	Apps	(Gls)
2021–2022	Sagan Tosu	5	(0)
2023–2025	Bayern Munich II	27	(1)
2023–2025	Bayern Munich	0	(0)
2024	→ Portimonense (loan)	11	(1)
2024–2025	→ Arouca (loan)	17	(0)
2025–	Arouca	46	(4)

International career^{‡}
2022–2023	Japan U20	12	(1)
- * Club domestic league appearances and goals as of 25 May 2026 ‡ National team caps and goals as of 19:30, 3 October 2024 (UTC)

Taichi Fukui (福井 太智, Fukui Taichi; born 15 July 2004) is a Japanese professional footballer who plays as a midfielder for Primeira Liga club Arouca.

== Club career ==
=== Sagan Tosu ===
On 17 March 2022, Fukui signed a Professional A contract with the club.

=== Bayern Munich ===
On 28 September 2022, Fukui was announced at FC Bayern, signing a two year and a half year contract. He officially joined the club on 1 January 2023.

On 16 September 2023, he was called up for the first time on the first team's bench in the Bundesliga match against Bayer Leverkusen but he did not feature however.

On 26 September, he made his debut and his first appearance for the Bayern Munich senior team in the first round of the DFB Pokal against 3. Liga club SC Preußen Münster, coming off the bench at the 63rd minute and contributing to a 4–0 victory. He also became the second ever Japanese footballer to play an official competitive match for Bayern Munich after Takashi Usami during the 2011–12 season.

==== Loan to Portimonense ====
On 31 January 2024, he renewed his contract with Bayern Munich until 2026 and was subsequently loaned to Portuguese Primeira Liga club Portimonense until June 2025.

==== Loan to Arouca ====
On 4 July 2024, his loan-spell with Portimonense was cut short and he was subsequently loaned to fellow Primeira Liga club Arouca for the 2024–25 season.

=== Arouca ===
Fukui transferred permanently to Arouca on 3 February 2025, for an estimated €1,600,000 transfer fee.

== International career ==
Fukui was called up to the Japan U-20 squad for the 2023 FIFA U-20 World Cup.

== Career statistics ==
=== Club ===
As of 4 May 2025

Appearances and goals by club, season and competition
Club	Season	League			National Cup		League Cup		Other		Total	
Club	Season	Division	Apps	Goals	Apps	Goals	Apps	Goals	Apps	Goals	Apps	Goals
Sagan Tosu	2021	J1 League	4	0	3 (Note: Appearances in the Emperor's Cup)	0	4 (Note: Appearances in the J.League Cup)	0	0	0	11	0
Sagan Tosu	2022	J1 League	1	0	0	0	3	0	0	0	4	0
Sagan Tosu	Total		5	0	3	0	7	0	0	0	15	0
Bayern Munich II	2022–23	Regionalliga Bayern	12	0	—		—		—		12	0
Bayern Munich II	2023–24	Regionalliga Bayern	15	1	—		—		—		15	1
Bayern Munich II	Total		27	1	—		—		—		27	1
Bayern Munich	2023–24	Bundesliga	0	0	1 (Note: Appearance in the DFB-Pokal)	0	0	0	0	0	1	0
Bayern Munich	Total		0	0	1	0	0	0	0	0	1	0
Portimonense (loan)	2023–24	Primeira Liga	11	1	0	0	0	0	2 (Note: Appearances in the Primeira Liga play-out)	0	13	1
Portimonense (loan)	Total		11	1	0	0	0	0	2	0	13	1
Arouca (loan)	2024–25	Primeira Liga	17	0	1 (Note: Appearance in the Taça de Portugal)	0	0	0	0	0	18	0
Arouca	2024–25	Primeira Liga	12	0	0	0	0	0	0	0	12	0
Arouca	Total		29	0	1	0	0	0	0	0	30	0
Career total			72	2	5	0	7	0	0	0	84	2
