= Zinho (footballer, born 2003) =

Brazilian footballer

Personal information
- Full name: Luis Henrique Hoffmann
- Date of birth: 9 May 2003 (age 23)
- Place of birth: Lajeado, Brazil
- Height: 1.77 m (5 ft 10 in)
- Position: Winger

Team information
- Current team: Portimonense
- Number: 99

Youth career
- 2014–2023: Grêmio

Senior career*
Years	Team	Apps	(Gls)
2023–2024	Grêmio	12	(0)
2023–2024	→ Portimonense (loan)	12	(0)
2024–	Portimonense	0	(0)
- * Club domestic league appearances and goals as of 3 July 2024

Luis Henrique Hoffmann (born 9 May 2003), commonly known as Zinho, is a Brazilian professional footballer who plays as a winger for Liga Portugal 2 club Portimonense.

== Career ==
Born in Lajeado, Rio Grande do Sul, Zinho joined Grêmio's youth setup in 2014, aged ten. On 12 June 2021, he renewed his contract with the club until the end of 2024.

Zinho made his first team debut on 18 February 2023, coming on as a late substitute for João Pedro in a 0–0 Campeonato Gaúcho away draw against São Luiz. On 14 March, he was definitely promoted to the main squad.

Zinho made his Série A debut on 16 April 2023, starting in a 1–0 home win over Santos.

On 1 September 2023, Grêmio announced that Zinho had been sent on a season-long loan with an option-to-buy to Primeira Liga club Portimonense.

== Career statistics ==
As of match played 17 December 2023

Appearances and goals by club, season and competition
Club	Season	League			State league		National cup		League cup		Total	
Club	Season	Division	Apps	Goals	Apps	Goals	Apps	Goals	Apps	Goals	Apps	Goals
Grêmio	2023	Série A	7	0	5 (Note: Appearance(s) in Campeonato Gaúcho)	0	5	0	—		17	0
Portimonense (loan)	2023–24	Primeira Liga	8	0	—		2	0	0	0	10	0
Career total			15	0	5	0	7	0	0	0	27	0

== Honours ==
Grêmio

- Campeonato Gaúcho: 2023
- Recopa Gaúcha: 2023
