= Watford Football Club Training Ground =

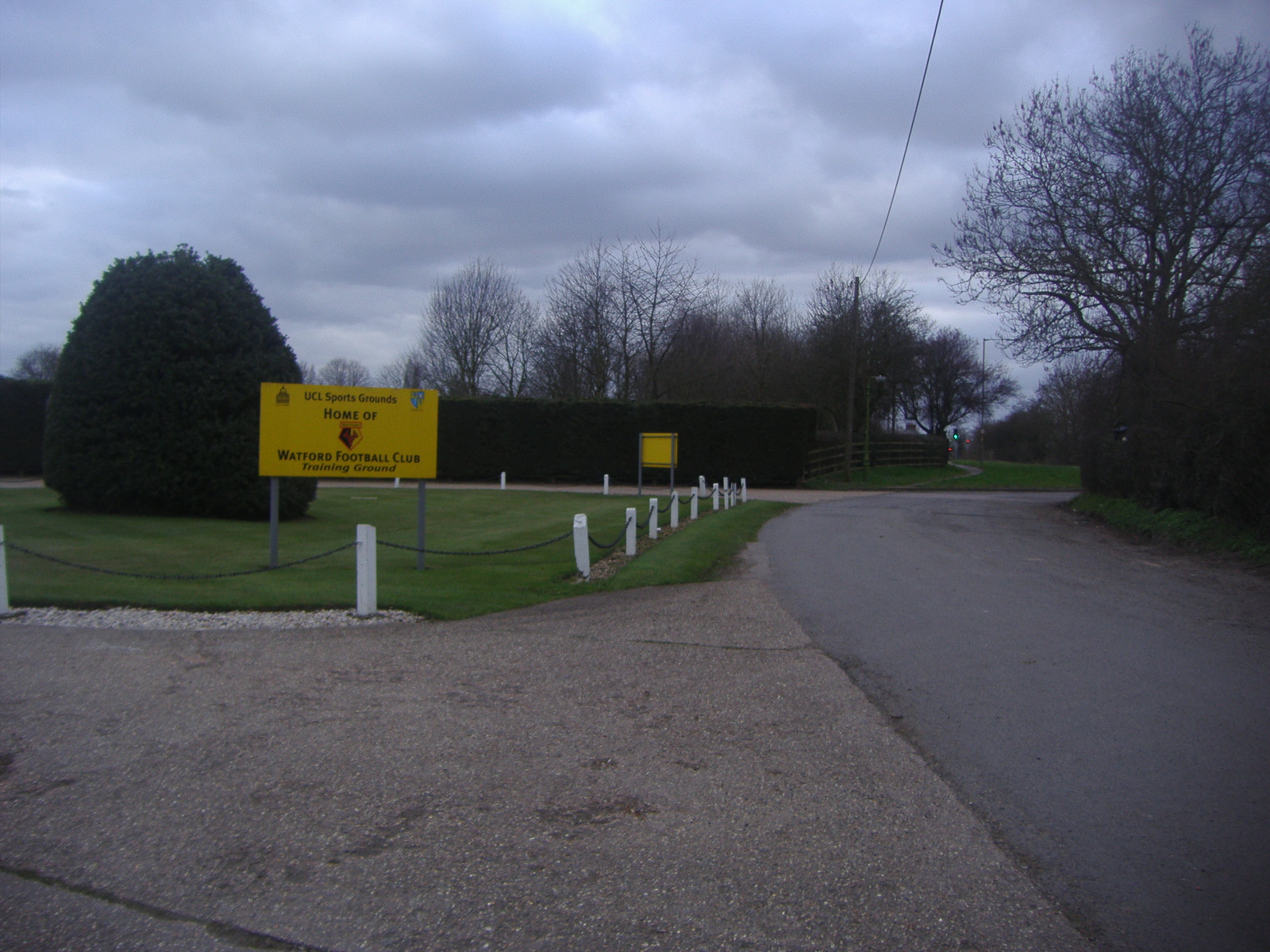
- Ground entrance
- Interactive map of Watford Football Club Training Ground
- Location: St Albans; Hertfordshire, England
- Coordinates: 51°42′38″N 0°16′48″W
- Owner: University College London (UCL)
- Type: Football training ground

Tenant
- Watford F.C. (training) (1999-)

The Watford Football Club Training Ground is the training ground and academy of the EFL Championship club Watford F.C. The centre is located on the University College London Union (UCLU) Shenley Sports grounds, in St Albans, Hertfordshire, situated between the Arsenal Training Centre and the de Havilland Aircraft Heritage Centre. The current Watford Training Ground was previously used by Arsenal F.C. until 1999 when they moved to their nearby own facilities.

With an approximate area of 83,000 square metres (890,000 sq ft), the centre is home to four full-size natural grass training pitches, a full-size artificial turf training pitch, two seven-a-side natural grass football pitches, as well as a service centre with gymnasium, press rooms and medical facilities.
