= Dean Gerken =

English footballer (born 1985)

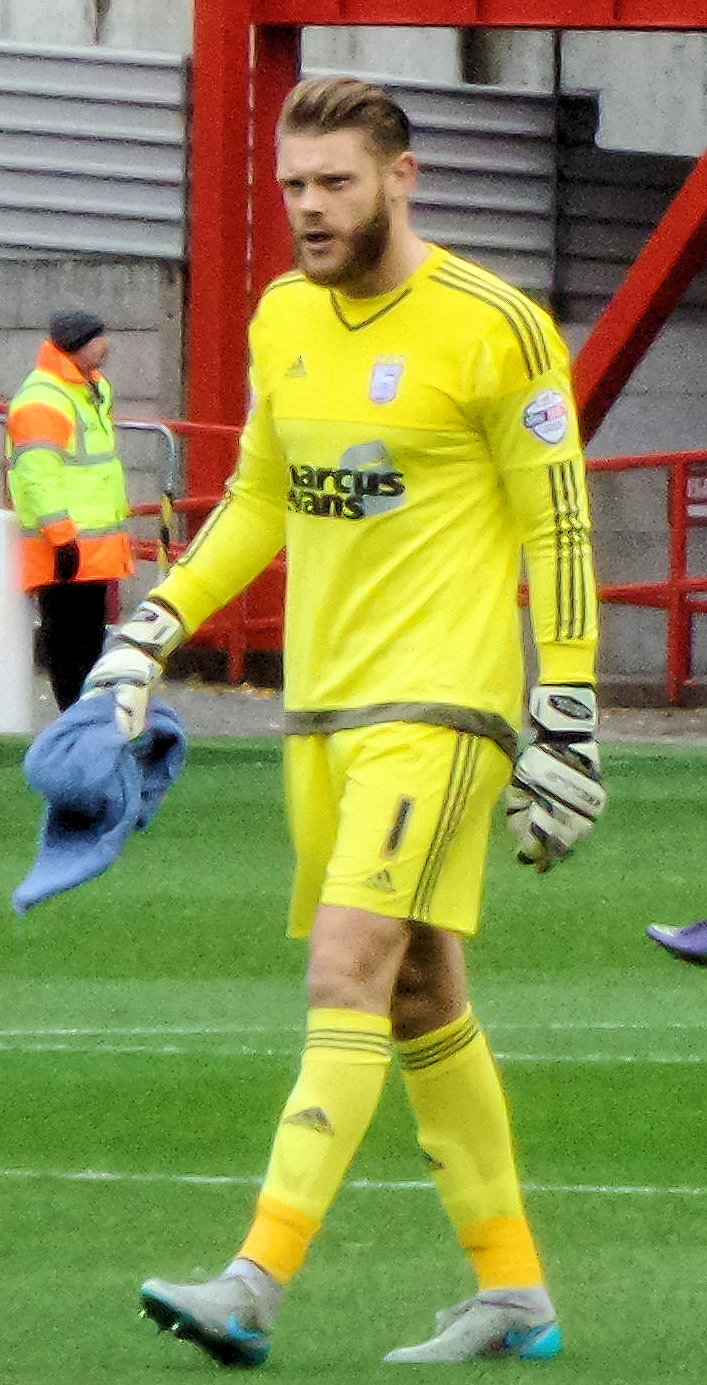
- Gerken playing for Ipswich Town in 2015

Personal information
- Full name: Dean Jeffery Gerken
- Date of birth: 22 May 1985 (age 41)
- Place of birth: Rochford, England
- Height: 6 ft 0 in (1.83 m)
- Position: Goalkeeper

Team information
- Current team: Bath City (goalkeeping coach)

Youth career
- –2002: Southend United
- 2002–2004: Colchester United

Senior career*
Years	Team	Apps	(Gls)
2004–2009	Colchester United	109	(0)
2009	→ Darlington (loan)	7	(0)
2009–2013	Bristol City	53	(0)
2013–2019	Ipswich Town	104	(0)
2019–2022	Colchester United	69	(0)
Total		342	(0)
- * Club domestic league appearances and goals as of 18:20, 2 December 2024 (UTC)

Dean Jeffery Gerken (born 22 May 1985) is an English professional footballer who played as a goalkeeper. He is goalkeeping coach at Bath City.

He started his career as a youth player at Southend United. He has previously played for Colchester United, Darlington, Bristol City and Ipswich Town.

== Club career ==
=== Colchester United ===
Gerken was born in Rochford. He started his career at Southend United as a youngster before moving to Essex rivals Colchester United. As a teenager he attracted the attention of England goalkeeping coach Ray Clemence. He made his first-team debut against Brentford in League One in 2004, as a stand-in for Simon Brown and Richard McKinney. In the 2004–05 season, replacing first-choice goalkeeper Aidan Davison, Gerken kept four clean sheets in 17 appearances.

More appearances in Colchester's successful 2005–06 campaign gave Gerken another four clean sheets, including the crucial 0–0 draw at Yeovil Town that clinched Colchester's promotion to the Football League Championship.

Gerken made the number one position his own as the over-achieving U's ended the 2006–07 season in tenth place. Gerken was crowned Colchester's Young Player of the Year for 2007. He signed an extended contract in July 2007, and played 40 League games during the 2007–08 season, at the end of which Colchester were relegated back to League One.

==== Darlington (loan) ====
On 15 January 2009, Gerken signed a one-month loan deal with League Two side Darlington. He went straight into the starting eleven for their next game, a 5–1 defeat of Luton Town.

Gerken returned to his parent club soon after, due to Darlington going into administration.

=== Bristol City ===
On 30 June 2009, it was confirmed that Bristol City had completed the signing of Gerken for an undisclosed fee, to end his seven-season stay with Colchester United. Gerken was arrested on suspicion of indecent exposure in the early hours of 25 October 2009 after he was allegedly spotted urinating in public.

On 22 March 2011, he signed a new two-year contract with Bristol City.

Gerken made his final game for City on 12 January 2013, in a 4–0 defeat at home to Leicester City. His manager, Derek McInnes, was sacked after the same match due to a recent run of poor results. On 8 May 2013, Gerken was released by Bristol City along with third-choice keeper Lewis Carey.

=== Ipswich Town ===
On 12 July 2013 Gerken joined Ipswich Town on a free transfer, signing a two-year contract. He made his debut for Ipswich Town in a 0–2 loss against Stevenage in the League Cup on 6 August 2013. Soon after he joined Ipswich he replaced Scott Loach as the first choice goalkeeper, starting 41 league games in his debut season at the club, keeping 10 clean sheets. However, with the arrival of fellow keeper Bartosz Białkowski in 2014, Gerken's first team play time would decrease gradually. Bialkowski's form would keep him out of the team for the next few seasons. On 8 January 2015, Gerken signed a new two-year contract with the club.

On 28 June 2017, he signed a new two-year contract with Ipswich.

He made just 1 league appearance in the 2017/18 season. However the following season, in a surprise move he was called back up to the starting lineup on 2 September 2018 in a match against Norwich and he remained in goal for a further 7 games before once again being dropped back to the bench following a mistake that led to a goal against QPR. He would make 10 further appearances in net during the season. After making 113 appearances for the Tractor Boys, it was announced on 20 May 2019 that his contract would not be renewed and he was released at the end of the season.

=== Return to Colchester United ===
Following his release by Ipswich Town, Gerken re-signed for his first club Colchester United on 13 July 2019 on a free transfer. He made his return debut on 3 August in their 1–1 League Two draw with Port Vale. On 24 January 2020, Gerken made his 300th career appearance in a league match against Bradford City, which ended in a 0–0 draw. Gerken was released by the club at the end of the 2021–22 season.

== Coaching career ==
In August 2022, following his retirement, Gerken returned to former club Bristol City as the club's academy head of goalkeeping. In July 2023, in addition to his role with the Championship club, he joined National League South side Bath City as goalkeeping coach.

== Career statistics ==
As of match played 28 September 2021

Appearances and goals by club, season and competition
Club	Season	League			FA Cup		League Cup		Other		Total	
Club	Season	Division	Apps	Goals	Apps	Goals	Apps	Goals	Apps	Goals	Apps	Goals
Colchester United	2003–04	Second Division	1	0	0	0	0	0	0	0	1	0
Colchester United	2004–05	League One	13	0	2	0	2	0	0	0	17	0
Colchester United	2005–06	League One	7	0	1	0	1	0	5 (Note: Appearance(s) in Football League Trophy)	0	14	0
Colchester United	2006–07	Championship	27	0	1	0	1	0	—		29	0
Colchester United	2007–08	Championship	40	0	1	0	1	0	—		42	0
Colchester United	2008–09	League One	21	0	0	0	2	0	1	0	24	0
Colchester United	Total		109	0	5	0	7	0	6	0	127	0
Darlington (loan)	2008–09	League Two	7	0	0	0	0	0	0	0	7	0
Bristol City	2009–10	Championship	39	0	2	0	2	0	—		43	0
Bristol City	2010–11	Championship	1	0	0	0	1	0	—		2	0
Bristol City	2011–12	Championship	10	0	0	0	1	0	—		11	0
Bristol City	2012–13	Championship	3	0	0	0	1	0	—		4	0
Bristol City	Total		53	0	2	0	5	0	0	0	60	0
Ipswich Town	2013–14	Championship	41	0	0	0	1	0	—		42	0
Ipswich Town	2014–15	Championship	16	0	1	0	0	0	0	0	17	0
Ipswich Town	2015–16	Championship	26	0	0	0	2	0	—		28	0
Ipswich Town	2016–17	Championship	2	0	2	0	1	0	—		5	0
Ipswich Town	2017–18	Championship	1	0	0	0	2	0	—		3	0
Ipswich Town	2018–19	Championship	18	0	0	0	0	0	—		18	0
Ipswich Town	Total		104	0	3	0	6	0	0	0	113	0
Colchester United	2019–20	League Two	36	0	1	0	5	0	2 (Note: Appearances in EFL League Two play-offs)	0	44	0
Colchester United	2020–21	League Two	33	0	1	0	1	0	0	0	35	0
Colchester United	2021–22	League Two	0	0	0	0	0	0	1 (Note: Appearance(s) in EFL Trophy)	0	1	0
Colchester United	Total		69	0	2	0	6	0	3	0	80	0
Career total			342	0	12	0	24	0	9	0	386	0

== Honours ==
Colchester United

- Football League One runner-up: 2005–06

Individual

- Colchester United Young Player of the Year: 2006–07
