= Sopwell House =

Hotel in Hertfordshire, England

Coordinates: 51°44′06″N 0°19′37″W

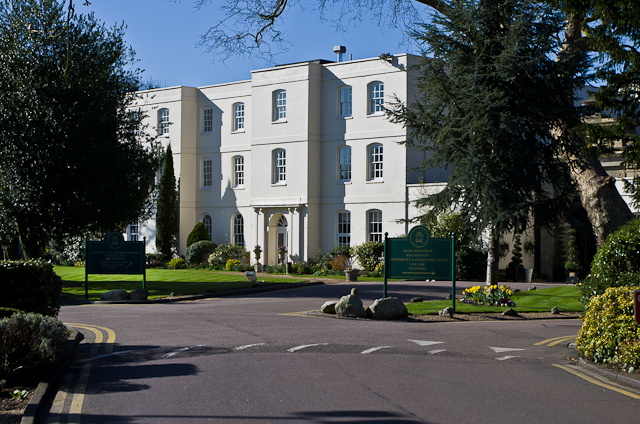

Sopwell House is a historic Georgian country house, a three-star luxury 126 bedroom hotel, country club & spa located south of St Albans, Hertfordshire, England. The main house is a Grade II listed building. It gained fame as the gathering place for the England national football team before international football events. It has also hosted other club and international football teams. The facilities include a conference & banqueting centre, multiple meeting rooms, 2 restaurants, 2 bars, gym, studio, and spa.

== History ==
Though mention of buildings on the site goes back to 1603, it was not developed as a country house until the master mason Edward Strong built his home here in the 18th century. Strong's career included work on St Paul's Cathedral and Blenheim Palace.

The site has a longer history preceding the present house: the grounds contain the remains of Sopwell Priory, a Benedictine nunnery founded in the 12th century, together with the remains of successive post-medieval houses built on the site. The ruins and buried remains of the priory and earlier mansions form a scheduled monument.

During the mid-19th century Sopwell House known then as New Barnes (or New Barns) was the seat of the philanthropist Mrs. Isabella Worley. Amongst the many donations to St Albans from this benefactor were Christ Church on Verulam Road and the Wooden Room in Lattimore Road.

The house was extended in Victorian times and in 1900 was leased to Prince Louis of Battenberg, an Admiral of the Royal Navy who made it his family home. His 4 children grew up here, Alice Mountbatten, Louise Mountbatten, George Mountbatten and Louis Mountbatten. They all had notable lives.

The young Louis, like his father, had a distinguished Royal Navy career and was to become the last British Viceroy of India as Louis Mountbatten, 1st Earl Mountbatten of Burma. Alice married Prince Andrew of Greece and their son is Prince Philip, Duke of Edinburgh. The proposal of marriage was made in the grounds of the house. Louise Mountbatten went on to marry and become Queen of Sweden.

The house remained associated with the Mountbatten family as part of its early-20th-century history, and the present hotel's history and marketing continue to identify the property's association with the family.

The home passed to the Verulam family after the Second World War and was sold to become a hotel in 1969.

The estate was acquired in 1986 and subsequently redeveloped into a contemporary hotel and leisure destination.

The current family continues to own and operate Sopwell House. The family acquired the property in 1986, and the hotel has subsequently undergone a series of redevelopment and refurbishment projects under their ownership.

Cottonmill Spa opened in 2019 as part of a major expansion project, introducing new spa facilities, treatment spaces and landscaped relaxation areas to the property. The opening followed a reported £14 million investment project and expanded the property's leisure facilities with a purpose-built three-storey spa

In 2022, the hotel opened Omboo, replacing its previous two-AA-rosette restaurant with an Asian and Far Eastern dining concept. In 2023, the Octagon Bar opened in the historic part of the house, and in 2025 The Brasserie underwent a redevelopment.

In 2026, Sopwell House marked 40 years since the current family acquired the property in 1986. The anniversary was commemorated by the hotel with events, accommodation packages and other activities celebrating the period of family ownership.

== Hotel ==
Sopwell House operates as a country house hotel offering accommodation, dining, leisure and event facilities. The property, spanning 12 acres, includes 126 bedrooms and suites, including 16 larger suites located within the landscaped Mews area of the estate.

The hotel contains several dining outlets, including The Brasserie, which serves classic British foods, and Omboo, an Asian restaurant introduced in 2022. The Octagon Bar opened in 2023, and provides an additional lounge and bar space for guests, offering drinks and light refreshments.

The hotel also provides afternoon tea and additional food and beverage service through its other public areas and bars.

Leisure facilities at the hotel include an indoor swimming pool, gym, and relaxation areas available to residents. In 2019, the property expanded with the opening of Cottonmill Spa, a purpose-built three story wellness facility offering treatment rooms, pools and terrace loungers for hotel guests. The spa also incorporates The Club at Cottonmill, an exclusive area that provides access to additional amenities. Cottonmill Spa and The Club at Cottonmill are two distinct areas within the wider spa operation. Cottonmill Spa provides access to swimming and vitality pools, a gym, heat experiences and a terrace area. The Club at Cottonmill provides access to the Cottonmill facilities together with additional relaxation and outdoor facilities, including spa gardens, a hydrotherapy pool, hot tubs, a Whisper Room and a Deep Relaxation Room. Access to The Club is restricted to members and certain hotel and spa guests. Guests staying in selected suites, including the Mews Suites, receive access to The Club at Cottonmill, while separate Cottonmill and Club memberships are available.

The hotel continues to operate under the ownership and management of the Bejerano family.

== Awards ==
Sopwell House has received a number of industry awards and distinctions:

- 2015: Condé Nast Johansens Award for Excellence – Best for Meetings.
- 2019: Prestigious Star Awards – Best Conference Venue.
- 2020: Preferred Hotels & Resorts GIFTTS Pineapple Award – Philanthropy.
- 2021: Condé Nast Johansens Award for Excellence – Best Destination Spa
- 2021: Boutique Hotelier Awards – Best Boutique Spa, for Cottonmill Spa
- 2022: Good Spa Guide Award – Best Spa in the East Midlands & East.
- 2023: Condé Nast Johansens Award for Excellence – Best Dining Experience (UK & Ireland), for Omboo.
- 2023: Condé Nast Johansens Award for Excellence – Best Spa Treatment Menu.
- 2023: Hitched Wedding Awards – Best Wedding Venue.
- 2024: Inspiring Herts Awards – Family Business of the Year.
- 2024: Inspiring Herts Awards – Business of the Year: Medium to Large.
- 2025: Condé Nast Johansens Award for Excellence – Best Recently Renovated Hotel (UK).
- 2025: Condé Nast Johansens Award for Excellence – Best Weekend Spa (UK).
- 2026: Condé Nast Johansens Award for Excellence – Best Spa Experience (UK).

== Meeting rooms and capacities ==
Sopwell House is used as a venue for meetings, private events, and weddings. The hotel features a dedicated meeting and conference suite with a private entrance, designed to accommodate corporate events and business meetings. It offers 15 meeting rooms with 19 possible configurations across two floors. Several ground-floor rooms have been refurbished and provide direct access to private terrace areas and the hotel gardens.

The hotel also offers outdoor spaces suitable for meetings, events, and team-building activities, including a walled garden that runs around the perimeter of the grounds and can be used for activities or temporary structures such as marquees.

The largest function space, the St Albans Suite, has a maximum capacity of approximately 700 delegates or 250 guests for a seated dinner and dance event. Day delegate packages and tailored dining options are available on request.
