= 2012 Carolina RailHawks FC season =

Carolina RailHawks
2012 season
- Owner: Traffic Sports USA
- Manager: Colin Clarke
- Stadium: WakeMed Soccer Park
- NASL: 4th
- Playoffs: semi-finals
- U.S. Open Cup: TBD
Home colors	Away colors

The 2012 Carolina RailHawks FC season was the sixth season of the club's existence. The RailHawks FC, played in the North American Soccer League, the second tier of the American soccer pyramid. The RailHawks are the defending NASL Regular Season Champions.

== Review ==
=== April ===
The Carolina RailHawks opened the 2012 NASL season on the road April 7, playing the Minnesota Stars in the Metrodome. The game ended in a 0–0 draw, with both teams earning their first point of the season. They returned home to WakeMed Soccer Park April 14, where they earned a 4–4 draw against the Atlanta Silverbacks. The RailHawks traveled to the Tampa Bay Rowdies on April 18, where they earned another draw, this time 1–1. Carolina ended the month of April with back-to-back losses, beginning with a 3–1 defeat away to the Puerto Rico Islanders. On April 27 the RailHawks signed forward Zack Schilawski. Carolina concluded April with a 0–1 home loss to the San Antonio Scorpions.

=== May ===
Carolina opened the month of May with a 3–3 draw at home against the Fort Lauderdale Strikers. This match saw Zack Schilawski make his first appearance for the RailHawks. The RailHawks lost at FC Edmonton 3–0 on May 6 on a hat trick by Edmonton forward Shaun Saiko followed by a 2–1 road loss to the Minnesota Stars on May 12. U.S. international prospect Gale Agbossoumonde made his RailHawks debut during the May 12 game at Minnesota after missing the first month of the regular season with a foot injury. On May 18 the Carolina RailHawks announced the signing of midfielder Nick Millington and defender Jamie Finch. The RailHawks returned home on May 19 and earned a 1–1 draw against the Puerto Rico Islanders.

May 22 marked the beginning of U.S. Open Cup play for the Carolina RailHawks. They earned a 6–0 win in their second-round game against USASA team PSA Elite. The following week the RailHawks played host to the Los Angeles Galaxy of Major League Soccer in the third round of the Open Cup in front of a record home attendance of 7,939. After an early Galaxy goal, RailHawks forward Ty Shipalane scored an equalizer in the 75th minute, and Brian Shriver scored on a pass from Shipalane in the 88th minute to see the RailHawks earn a 2–1 win.

=== June ===
Carolina earned their first league win of 2012 on June 2 with a 2–1 home victory over the Puerto Rico Islanders. Ty Shipalane scored in the 88th minute to give the RailHawks the go-ahead goal. June 5 saw the end of the RailHawks’ 2012 U.S. Open Cup after a home defeat to MLS team Chivas USA. Juan Pablo Ángel converted a penalty kick in stoppage time to give Chivas the 2–1 win. On June 9 the Railhawks scored a 5–1 victory over then NASL leading Minnesota Stars. Rookie defender Austen King scored his only goal of the 2012 season in the 24th minute. Midfielder Chris Nurse returned to the RailHawks on June 14 after international duty, where he captained the Guyana National Team in CONCACAF World Cup Qualifying losses to Mexico and Costa Rica. Carolina earned a 2–0 road win against the Atlanta Silverbacks on June 16. The following week the RailHawks returned home and secured a 2–0 win over FC Edmonton, taking their league winning streak to four games. Bréiner Ortiz scored his first career goal for the RailHawks in the 38th minute on an assist from Schilawski. The RailHawks ended the month of June in Fort Lauderdale, where they suffered a 2–1 loss to the Fort Lauderdale Strikers.

== Club ==
=== Roster ===
No.	Position	Nation	Player
0	MF	USA	Floyd Franks
1	GK	USA	Akira Fitzgerald
2	DF	SCO	Greg Shields
3	DF	USA	Kupono Low
4	MF	USA	Tommy Drake
5	MF	USA	Amir Lowery
6	DF	CRC	James Scott
6	MF	POL	Konrad Warzycha
7	MF	USA	Austin da Luz
8	MF	USA	Luke Sassano
9	FW	USA	Jason Garey
10	MF	USA	Mike Palacio
11	MF	RSA	Ty Shipalane
12	GK	USA	Nicolas Platter
13	FW	USA	Brian Ackley
14	MF	GUY	Nick Millington
15	DF	USA	Austen King
16	DF	USA	Jamie Finch
17	DF	TOG	Gale Agbossoumonde
18	GK	USA	Ray Burse
20	MF	COL	Bréiner Ortiz
21	FW	USA	Brian Shriver
22	FW	USA	Zack Schilawski
23	FW	USA	Nick Zimmerman
24	DF	UGA	Henry Kalungi
25	DF	ENG	Sam Stockley
26	MF	USA	Cory Elenio
27	DF	USA	John Krause
28	DF	USA	Jordan Graye
30	MF	GUY	Chris Nurse
31	FW	USA	Matt Luzunaris
32	DF	USA	Justin Willis

=== Coaching staff ===
- (Northern Ireland) Colin Clarke – Head Coach
- (United States) Dewan Bader – Assistant Coach
- (United States) John Bradford – Assistant Coach
- (Scotland) Greg Shields – Assistant Coach
- (United States) Nicolas Platter – Assistant Coach

== Competitions ==
=== Preseason ===
March 4, 2012 Preseason	Carolina RailHawks	2 - 2 (a.e.t.) (4–2 p)	Vancouver Whitecaps FC	Cary, North Carolina
	Lowery 6'; Shriver 71'	Report	Tan 49'; Chiumiento 90'	Stadium: WakeMed Soccer Park

=== North American Soccer League ===
==== Standings ====
Pos	Team	Pld	W	D	L	GF	GA	GD	Pts	Qualification
2	Tampa Bay Rowdies (C)	28	12	9	7	37	30	+7	45	Playoff semifinals
3	Puerto Rico Islanders	28	11	8	9	32	30	+2	41	Playoff quarterfinals
4	Carolina RailHawks	28	10	10	8	44	46	−2	40	Playoff quarterfinals
5	Fort Lauderdale Strikers	28	9	9	10	40	46	−6	36	Playoff quarterfinals
6	Minnesota United	28	8	11	9	34	33	+1	35	Playoff quarterfinals

Source: NASL Standings
Rules for classification: 1) points; 2) goal difference; 3) number of goals scored.
(C) Champions

==== Results summary ====
Overall								Home						Away					
Pld	W	D	L	GF	GA	GD	Pts	W	D	L	GF	GA	GD	W	D	L	GF	GA	GD
28	10	10	8	44	46	−2	40	6	6	2	29	21	+8	4	4	6	15	25	−10

Last updated: September 22, 2012.
Source: Match results

==== Match results ====
April 7, 2012 Match 1	Minnesota Stars	0 - 0	Carolina RailHawks	Minneapolis, Minnesota
20:30 EDT	Takada (yellow card) 73'	Report	Nurse (yellow card) 67'	Stadium: Humphrey Metrodome; Attendance: 8,693; Referee: Terry Vaughn

April 14, 2012 Match 2	Carolina RailHawks	4 - 4	Atlanta Silverbacks	Cary, North Carolina
19:30 EDT	Palacio 2'; King (yellow card) 22'; Zimmerman 38', 74'; Paulini (yellow card) 44'; Lowery (yellow card) 61'; Shriver 90'; Ackley (red card) 90'; Nurse (red card) 90'	Report	Lancaster (yellow card) 26'; Navia 39', 80'; Cox 42'; Hunt (yellow card) 54' (yellow-red card) 77' (goal) 67'; Illyes (yellow card) 81'; Colaluca (red card) 90'	Stadium: WakeMed Soccer Park; Attendance: 3,683; Referee: Jose Carlos Rivero

April 18, 2012 Match 3	Tampa Bay Rowdies	1 - 1	Carolina RailHawks	St. Petersburg, Florida
19:30 EDT	Yoshitake 70'	Report	Shriver 66'	Stadium: Al Lang Stadium; Attendance: 2,288; Referee: Armando Villarreal

April 21, 2012 Match 4	Puerto Rico Islanders	3 - 1	Carolina RailHawks	Bayamon, Puerto Rico
19:30 EDT	Foley 27' Martinez 30' Addlery 55'	Report	Own goal 48'	Stadium: Bayamon Soccer Complex; Attendance: 1,542; Referee: Jesus Lebron

April 28, 2012 Match 5	Carolina RailHawks	0 - 1	San Antonio Scorpions	Cary, North Carolina
19:00 EDT			Harmse 82'	Stadium: WakeMed Soccer Park; Attendance: 3,041; Referee: Andrew Chapin

May 2, 2012 Match 6	Carolina RailHawks	3 - 3	Fort Lauderdale Strikers	Cary, North Carolina
19:00 EDT	Shriver 41' Zimmerman 47' Zimmerman 65'		Laing 61' Restrepo 67' Anderson 77'	Stadium: WakeMed Soccer Park; Attendance: 2,718; Referee: Fotis Bazakos

May 6, 2012 Match 7	FC Edmonton	3 - 0	Carolina RailHawks	Edmonton, Alberta
16:00 EDT	Saiko 55' Saiko 59' Saiko 82'			Stadium: Clarke Stadium; Attendance: 1,120; Referee: David Barrie

May 12, 2012 Match 8	Minnesota Stars	2 - 1	Carolina RailHawks	Blaine, Minnesota
20:30 EDT	Walker 16' Venegas 53'		Austin Da Luz 90'	Stadium: NSC Stadium; Attendance: 2,168

May 19, 2012 Match 9	Carolina RailHawks	1 - 1	Puerto Rico Islanders	Cary, North Carolina
19:00 EDT	Shriver 49'		Fana 33'	Stadium: WakeMed Soccer Park; Attendance: 3,020; Referee: Robert Sibiga

June 2, 2012 Match 10	Carolina RailHawks	2 - 1	Puerto Rico Islanders	Cary, North Carolina
19:00 EDT				Stadium: WakeMed Soccer Park; Attendance: 3,020; Referee: Robert Sibiga

June 9, 2012 Match 11	Carolina RailHawks	5 - 1	Minnesota Stars FC	Cary, North Carolina
19:00 EDT	King 24'; Lowery (yellow card) 25'; Zimmerman 41'; Shriver 53'; Schilawski 61'; Garey 90+4'	Summary	Bracalello 45+2'; Hlavaty (yellow card) 82'; Altman (yellow card) 82'; Davis (yellow card) 90'	Stadium: WakeMed Soccer Park; Attendance: 2,580

June 16, 2012 Match 12	Atlanta Silverbacks	0 - 2	Carolina RailHawks	Chamblee, Georgia
19:30 EDT	Navia (yellow card) 31'	Summary	Schilawski 44'; Agbossoumonde (yellow card) 45+2'; Ackley 86'	Stadium: Atlanta Silverbacks Park; Attendance: 6,000

June 23, 2012 Match 13	Carolina RailHawks	2 - 0	FC Edmonton	Cary, North Carolina
19:00 EDT	Shipalane (yellow card) 7'; Zimmerman 34'; Ortiz 38'; Stockley (yellow card) 61'; Agbossoumonde (yellow card) 68'; Lowery (yellow card) 76' (yellow-red card) 77'	Summary	Lam (yellow card) 54'; Hamilton (yellow card) 85' van Leerdam (yellow card) 88'	Stadium: WakeMed Soccer Park; Attendance: 3,600

June 30, 2012 Match 14	Fort Lauderdale Strikers	2 - 1	Carolina RailHawks	Fort Lauderdale, Florida
19:30 EDT	Anderson 5', 45+2'; Pecka (yellow card) 40'; Ramos (yellow card) 67'	Summary	Zimmerman 83'	Stadium: Lockhart Stadium; Attendance: 3,506

July 3, 2012 Match 15	Carolina RailHawks	2 - 1	Atlanta Silverbacks	Cary, North Carolina
19:00 EDT	Zimmerman 4', 50' (yellow card) 84'	Summary	Horth 15'; Robertson (yellow card) 64'	Stadium: WakeMed Soccer Park; Attendance: 4,475

July 7, 2012 Match 16	Carolina RailHawks	3 - 3	Fort Lauderdale Strikers	Cary, North Carolina
19:10 EDT	Palacio 13', 87'; Shipalane 90'	Summary	King 31'; Restrepo 33', 69'; Ståhl (yellow card) 40'	Stadium: WakeMed Soccer Park; Attendance: 2,713

July 21, 2012 Match 17	Carolina RailHawks	1 - 0	Minnesota Stars FC	Cary, North Carolina
19:05 EDT	Schilawski 10'; Lowery (yellow card) 60'; Low (yellow card) 72' (yellow-red card) 77'	Summary	Evan Sassano (yellow card) 69'; Bracalello (yellow card) 81'	Stadium: WakeMed Soccer Park; Attendance: 3,158

July 28, 2012 Match 18	San Antonio Scorpions	8 - 0	Carolina RailHawks	San Antonio
19:30 EDT	Janicki 5', 59'; Pablo Campos 15', 54' (pen.), 72', 81'; Bayona 61'; Wagner 65'	Summary	King (red card) 32'; Agbossoumonde (yellow card) 54'	Stadium: Heroes Stadium; Attendance: 7,186

August 4, 2012 Match 19	Carolina RailHawks	3 - 3	Tampa Bay Rowdies	Cary, North Carolina
19:00 EDT	da Luz (yellow card) 21'; Zimmerman 43', 49'; Garey 52'; Stockley (yellow card) 59'	Summary	Hill 17'; Mulholland 86'; Yamada 90+2'	Stadium: WakeMed Soccer Park; Attendance: 5,002

August 11, 2012 Match 20	Fort Lauderdale Strikers	1 - 0	Carolina RailHawks	Fort Lauderdale, Florida
19:30 EDT	Herron 64'	Summary	Shipalane (yellow card) 85'	Stadium: Lockhart Stadium; Attendance: 3,549

August 18, 2012 Match 21	Carolina RailHawks	3 - 2	FC Edmonton	Cary, North Carolina
19:00 EDT	Zimmerman 30'; Lowery (yellow card) 33'; Schilawski 79'; Stockley (yellow card) 87'; Shipalane 90+1'	Summary	Craig 9'; West (yellow card) 59'; Porter 73'	Stadium: WakeMed Soccer Park; Attendance: 3,688

August 25, 2012 Match 22	Atlanta Silverbacks	0 - 1	Carolina RailHawks	Chamblee, Georgia
19:30 EDT	Burciaga, Jr. (yellow card) 19'; Navarro (yellow card) 26'	Summary	Agbossoumonde (yellow card) 29'; Lowery (yellow card) 55'; Ackley 66'	Stadium: Atlanta Silverbacks Park; Attendance: 4,896

September 1, 2012 Match 23	Puerto Rico Islanders	1 - 3	Carolina RailHawks	Bayamón, Puerto Rico
19:30 EDT	Ramos 48'; Needham (yellow card) 66' (yellow-red card) 76'; Rivera (yellow card) 87'	Summary	Ackley 19'; Garey 36' (yellow card) 69' (red card) 79'; Zimmerman (yellow card) 45' (goal) 72'; Shields (yellow card) 48'	Stadium: Juan Ramón Loubriel Stadium; Attendance: 1,375

September 8, 2012 Match 24	Carolina RailHawks	0 - 1	San Antonio Scorpions	Cary, North Carolina
19:00 EDT	Shipalane (yellow card) 90'	Summary	Harmse (yellow card) 35'; Cunningham 84'	Stadium: WakeMed Soccer Park

September 12, 2012 Match 25	FC Edmonton	2 - 2	Carolina RailHawks	Edmonton
20:05 EDT	Porter 9', 49'	Summary	Zimmerman 5', 57'; Garey (yellow card) 31'	Stadium: Clarke Stadium; Attendance: 1,251

September 16, 2012 Match 26	San Antonio Scorpions	1 - 2	Carolina RailHawks	San Antonio
18:00 EDT	Greenfield (yellow card) 41'; Pablo Campos 64' (yellow card) 64'	Summary	Agbossoumonde 42'; Shipalane 69'	Stadium: Heroes Stadium; Attendance: 7,701

September 19, 2012 Match 27	Tampa Bay Rowdies	1 - 1	Carolina RailHawks	St. Petersburg, Florida
19:30 EDT	Arango 13' (yellow card) 22'	Summary	Shipalane 61'	Stadium: Progress Energy Park; Attendance: 2,194

September 22, 2012 Match 28	Carolina RailHawks	0 - 0	Tampa Bay Rowdies	Cary, North Carolina
19:00 EDT		Summary	Frimpong (yellow card) 68'; Hill (yellow card) 90'	Stadium: WakeMed Soccer Park; Attendance: 7,310

== Playoffs ==
September 29, 2012 QF	Carolina RailHawks	3 - 1	Fort Lauderdale Strikers	Cary, North Carolina
7:00 pm EDT	Amir Lowery 34' (yellow card) 71'; Ty Shipalane 52' 67'; Floyd Franks (yellow card) 86'	Report	Conor Shanosky (yellow card) 58'; Abe Thompson 61'; Lance Laing (yellow card) 90+'	Stadium: WakeMed Soccer Park

October 6, 2012 SF - 1st Leg	Carolina RailHawks	1 - 2	Tampa Bay Rowdies	Cary, North Carolina
7:00 pm EDT	Brian Shriver 78'; Amir Lowery (yellow card) 86'; Floyd Franks (yellow card) 89'	Report	Mike Ambersley 64' (yellow card) 90+'; Andres Arango (yellow card) 77'; Jeff Attinella (yellow card) 83'; Dan Antoniuk 85'	Stadium: WakeMed Soccer Park; Attendance: 3,183

October 13, 2012 SF - 2nd Leg	Tampa Bay Rowdies	3 - 3	Carolina RailHawks	St. Petersburg, Florida
7:30 pm EDT	Matt Luzunaris 14'; Ty Shipalane 18'; Gale Agbossoumonde (yellow card) 35'; Nick Zimmerman 86' (pen.)	Report	Shane Hill 40' (pen.); Mike Ambersley 65'; Luke Mulholland 84' (yellow card) 90+'	Stadium: Al Lang Stadium

Tampa Bay advances 5 - 4 on aggregate.

=== U.S. Open Cup ===
May 22, 2012 Second round	Carolina RailHawks (North Carolina)	6 - 0	(California) PSA Elite	Cary, North Carolina
19:07 PM EDT	Shriver 7', 23', 40', 90'; Lowery 9'; Schilawski 41'			Stadium: WakeMed Soccer Park

May 29, 2012 Third round	Carolina RailHawks (North Carolina)	2 - 1	(California) Los Angeles Galaxy	Cary, North Carolina
19:07 PM EDT	Shipalane 75'; Shriver 88'		Noon 38'	Stadium: WakeMed Soccer Park

June 5, 2012 Fourth round	Carolina RailHawks (North Carolina)	1 - 2	(California) C.D. Chivas USA	Cary, North Carolina
19:07 PM EDT	Palacio 79'		Agudelo 31'; Ángel 90+3' (pen.)	Stadium: WakeMed Soccer Park

== See also ==
- 2012 in American soccer
- Carolina RailHawks FC
