= 2013 Carolina RailHawks FC season =

Carolina RailHawks
2013 season
- Owner: Traffic Sports USA
- Manager: Colin Clarke
- Stadium: WakeMed Soccer Park
- NASL: Spring: TBD; Fall: TBD
- Playoffs: TBD
- U.S. Open Cup: TBD
Home colors	Away colors

The 2013 Carolina RailHawks FC season was the club's seventh season of existence, and their third season in the North American Soccer League, the second division of American soccer.

== Competitions ==
=== Preseason ===
February 24, 2013 Preseason	Carolina RailHawks (United States)	0–3	(Canada) Vancouver Whitecaps FC	Cary, North Carolina
		Report	Sanvezzo 9' (pen.), 34', 49'	Stadium: WakeMed Soccer Park

February 26, 2013 Preseason	Duke Blue Devils	1–3	Carolina RailHawks	Durham, North Carolina
	Goal	Report	Goal	Stadium: Koskinen Stadium

2013 Preseason	Richmond Kickers	1–4	Carolina RailHawks	Richmond, Virginia
	Goal	Report	Shriver,,

March 9, 2013 Preseason	Carolina RailHawks	v	Wake Forest Demon Deacons	Cary, North Carolina
12:00 PM	{			Stadium: WakeMed Soccer Park

March 14, 2013 Preseason	Carolina RailHawks	v	Charleston Battery	Cary, North Carolina
3:00 PM				Stadium: WakeMed Soccer Park

March 16, 2013 Preseason	Carolina RailHawks	v	UNC Wilmington Seahawks	Cary, North Carolina
1:00 PM				Stadium: WakeMed Soccer Park

March 20, 2013 Preseason	Carolina RailHawks (United States)	v	(Mexico) UNAM Pumas	Cary, North Carolina
7:30 PM				Stadium: WakeMed Soccer Park

March 23, 2013 Preseason	Carolina RailHawks	v	North Carolina Tar Heels	Cary, North Carolina
1:00 PM				Stadium: WakeMed Soccer Park

March 27, 2013 Preseason	Carolina RailHawks	v	NC State Wolfpack	Cary, North Carolina
10:00 AM				Stadium: WakeMed Soccer Park

March 30, 2013 Preseason	Charleston Battery	v	Carolina RailHawks	Charleston, South Carolina
2:00 PM				Stadium: Blackbaud Stadium

=== U.S. Open Cup ===
May 21, 2013 Second round	Carolina RailHawks	3–1	Carolina Dynamo	Cary, North Carolina
19:00 EDT	Shipalane 26' da Luz 53'; Schilawski 75'	Report	Martinez 39'	Stadium: WakeMed Soccer Park; Referee: Daniel Burak

May 29, 2013 Third round	Carolina RailHawks	2–0	Los Angeles Galaxy	Cary, North Carolina
19:15 EDT	Shipalane (yellow card) 43' da Luz 59'; Shriver 61'; Schilawski (yellow card) 83'	Report	Walker (yellow card) 44'	Stadium: WakeMed Soccer Park; Attendance: 8,121; Referee: Daniel Fitzgerald

June 12, 2013 Fourth round	Carolina RailHawks	3–1	C.D. Chivas USA	Cary, North Carolina
19:00 EDT	Shipalane 13'; Elizondo 92'; Ackley 98'	Report	Vilchez 57'	Stadium: WakeMed Soccer Park; Attendance: 5,066; Referee: Alejandro Mariscal

June 26, 2013 Quarterfinals	Real Salt Lake	3–0	Carolina RailHawks	Sandy, Utah
19:30 EDT	Beltran 36'; Wingert 51'; Saborío 86'	Report		Stadium: Rio Tinto Stadium; Attendance: 10,287; Referee: Fotis Bazakos

== Statistics ==
=== Appearances and goals ===
No.	Pos	Nat	Player	Total		NASL		U.S. Open Cup	
No.	Pos	Nat	Player	Apps	Goals	Apps	Goals	Apps	Goals
0	MF	(United States) USA	Floyd Franks	5	2	5+0	2	0+0	0
1	GK	(United States) USA	Akira Fitzgerald	5	0	5+0	0	0+0	0
2	DF	(Scotland) SCO	Greg Shields	1	0	0+1	0	0+0	0
3	DF	(Puerto Rico) PUR	Kupono Low	5	0	5+0	0	0+0	0
4	DF	(United States) USA	Eddie Ababio	2	0	0+2	0	0+0	0
5	DF	(Canada) CAN	Paul Hamilton	4	0	4+0	0	0+0	0
6	MF	(United States) USA	Austin da Luz	5	1	5+0	1	0+0	0
7	FW	(United States) USA	Ben Truax	0	0	0+0	0	0+0	0
8	MF	(Costa Rica) CRC	Jake Beckford	0	0	0+0	0	0+0	0
9	FW	(Jamaica) JAM	Nicholas Addlery	0	0	0+0	0	0+0	0
10	MF	(United States) USA	Ciaran O'Brien	3	0	0+3	0	0+0	0
11	MF	(South Africa) RSA	Ty Shipalane	5	0	4+1	0	0+0	0
12	DF	(Trinidad and Tobago) TTO	Julius James	3	0	3+0	0	0+0	0
13	FW	(United States) USA	Brian Ackley	5	0	1+4	0	0+0	0
14	MF	(Guyana) GUY	Nick Millington	5	0	5+0	0	0+0	0
15	DF	(United States) USA	Austen King	3	0	3+0	0	0+0	0
16	MF	(United States) USA	Kevin Burns	0	0	0+0	0	0+0	0
17	DF	(United States) USA	Jordan Graye	5	1	5+0	1	0+0	0
18	GK	(United States) USA	Tim Murray	0	0	0+0	0	0+0	0
19	MF	(Uruguay) URU	Enzo Martínez (on loan from Real Salt Lake)	2	1	0+2	1	0+0	0
20	MF	(Colombia) COL	Bréiner Ortiz	0	0	0+0	0	0+0	0
21	FW	(United States) USA	Brian Shriver	5	5	5+0	5	0+0	0
22	FW	(United States) USA	Zack Schilawski	5	2	5+0	2	0+0	0
23	FW	(United States) USA	Nick Zimmerman	0	0	0+0	0	0+0	0
25	DF	(England) ENG	Sam Stockley	1	0	0+1	0	0+0	0
32	DF	(United States) USA	Justin Willis	0	0	0+0	0	0+0	0
—	FW	(Costa Rica) CRC	César Elizondo	0	0	0+0	0	0+0	0
—	DF	(Scotland) SCO	Kevin Rutkiewicz	0	0	0+0	0	0+0	0
			Own goals for	0	0	0+0	0	0+0	0
