= 2003–04 Colchester United F.C. season =

Colchester United
2003–04 season
- Chairman: Peter Heard
- Manager: Phil Parkinson
- Stadium: Layer Road
- Second Division: 11th
- FA Cup: 5th round (eliminated by Sheffield United)
- League Cup: 2nd round (eliminated by Rotherham United)
- Football League Trophy: Final (southern section) (eliminated by Southend United)
- Top goalscorer: League: Wayne Andrews (12); All: Scott McGleish (17)
- Highest home attendance: 5,611 v Accrington Stanley, 13 January 2004
- Lowest home attendance: 2,367 v Plymouth Argyle, 12 August 2003
- Average home league attendance: 3,730
- Biggest win: 4–1 v Notts County, 10 April 2004
- Biggest defeat: 1–4 v Rushden & Diamonds, 22 November 2003
Home colours

The 2003–04 season was Colchester United's 62nd season in their history and their sixth successive season in the third tier of English football, the Second Division. Alongside competing in the Second Division, the club also participated in the FA Cup, the League Cup and the Football League Trophy.

Colchester embarked on cup runs in the FA Cup, reaching the fifth round where they were eliminated by Sheffield United, while they also were one fixture away from a trip to the Millennium Stadium in the Football League Trophy after falling to a 4–3 aggregate defeat to Southend United. The U's cup exploits eventually led to a late season drop in form, as they slipped from 5th position to 14th with fixture congestion. They recovered to finished 11th, nine points away from the play-offs.

== Season overview ==
Phil Parkinson embarked on his first full season in charge by applying what he had learnt from the final few months of the previous campaign, while gaining his UEFA A Licence and UEFA B Licence as well as a degree he studied for in his spare time. He introduced sports science to the club, revolutionising the way players trained, ate and rested.

The U's participated in a record 15 cup ties during the season, making significant progress in the FA Cup and Football League Trophy. Helped by the astute signings of Wayne Andrews and Premier League youngsters Craig Fagan and Rowan Vine, Colchester reached the FA Cup fifth round, defeating Oxford United, Aldershot Town, Accrington Stanley, and Coventry City, courtesy of a Vine hat-trick, before succumbing to Sheffield United 1–0 at Bramall Lane. Two days after the FA Cup clash, the U's were faced with the task of overcoming a Football League Trophy southern section final first-leg 3–2 deficit against Southend United. The match ended 1–1, with former U's manager Steve Wignall's Southend progressing. Fixture congestion was a contributing factor in Colchester's slip down the table from 5th position to 14th, while losing Karl Duguid to a serious knee injury.

At the end of the season, Colchester completed the campaign in eleventh position, nine points adrift of the play-off places.

== Players ==
As of match played 8 May 2004.

| No. | Name | Position | Nationality | Place of birth | Date of birth | Apps | Goals | Signed from | Date signed | Fee |
Goalkeepers
| 1 | Simon Brown | GK | (England) | Chelmsford | 3 December 1976 (aged 26) | 114 | 0 | (England) Tottenham Hotspur | 20 July 1999 | Free transfer |
| 13 | Dean Gerken | GK | (England) | Southend-on-Sea | 22 May 1985 (aged 18) | 0 | 0 | Youth team | 1 August 2002 | Free transfer |
| 31 | Richard McKinney | GK | (Northern Ireland) | Ballymoney | 18 May 1979 (aged 24) | 23 | 0 | (England) Swindon Town | 10 August 2002 | Free transfer |
Defenders
| 2 | Andy Myers | CB/FB | (England) | Hounslow | 3 November 1973 (aged 29) | 0 | 0 | (England) Bradford City | 11 July 2003 | Free transfer |
| 3 | Joe Keith | FB | (England) | Plaistow | 1 October 1978 (aged 24) | 165 | 19 | (England) West Ham United | 24 May 1999 | Free transfer |
| 5 | Scott Fitzgerald | CB | (Republic of Ireland) | (England) Westminster | 13 August 1969 (aged 33) | 100 | 0 | (England) Millwall | 19 October 2000 | Free transfer |
| 19 | Alan White | CB | (England) | Darlington | 22 March 1975 (aged 28) | 120 | 3 | (England) Luton Town | 16 July 2000 | Free transfer |
| 20 | Ross Crouch | CB | (England) | Colchester | 26 March 1985 (aged 18) | 0 | 0 | Youth team | 14 April 2004 | Free transfer |
| 21 | John White | FB | (England) | Colchester | 26 July 1986 (aged 16) | 0 | 0 | Youth team | 1 July 2003 | Free transfer |
| 22 | Greg Halford | FB/MF | (England) | Chelmsford | 8 December 1984 (aged 18) | 1 | 0 | Youth team | 1 August 2002 | Free transfer |
| 24 | Pat Baldwin | CB | (England) | City of London | 12 November 1982 (aged 20) | 22 | 0 | (England) Chelsea | 16 August 2002 | Free transfer |
| 25 | Sam Stockley | FB | (England) | Tiverton | 5 September 1977 (aged 25) | 35 | 1 | (England) Oxford United | 31 October 2002 | Free transfer |
Midfielders
| 4 | Gavin Johnson | MF | (England) | Eye | 10 October 1970 (aged 32) | 102 | 3 | (Scotland) Dunfermline Athletic | 14 November 1999 | Free transfer |
| 6 | Thomas Pinault | MF | (France) | Grasse | 4 December 1981 (aged 21) | 93 | 5 | (France) AS Cannes | 1 July 1999 | Free transfer |
| 7 | Karl Duguid | MF | (England) | Letchworth | 21 March 1978 (aged 25) | 266 | 37 | Youth team | 9 December 1995 (Note: Date of signing refers to the date of the player's first game for the club) | Free transfer |
| 10 | Kemal Izzet | MF | (England) | Whitechapel | 29 September 1980 (aged 22) | 99 | 14 | (England) Charlton Athletic | 13 April 2001 | Free transfer |
| 15 | Craig Johnston | MF | (England) | | 4 December 1985 (aged 17) | 0 | 0 | Youth team | 1 July 2002 | Free transfer |
| 17 | Bobby Bowry | MF | (Saint Kitts and Nevis) | (England) Hampstead | 19 May 1971 (aged 32) | 79 | 2 | (England) Millwall | 25 July 2001 | Free transfer |
| | Liam Coleman | MF/FW | (England) | Colchester | 11 January 1986 (aged 17) | 0 | 0 | Youth team | 1 July 2003 | Free transfer |
Forwards
| 8 | Wayne Andrews | FW | (England) | Paddington | 25 November 1977 (aged 25) | 0 | 0 | (England) Oldham Athletic | 2 July 2003 | Free transfer |
| 9 | Scott McGleish | FW | (England) | Chipping Barnet | 10 February 1974 (aged 29) | 136 | 36 | (England) Barnet | 12 January 2001 | £15,000 |
| 11 | Jamie Cade | FW | (England) | Durham | 15 January 1985 (aged 18) | 0 | 0 | (England) Middlesbrough | 25 November 2003 | Free transfer |
| 12 | Craig Fagan | FW | (England) | Birmingham | 11 December 1982 (aged 20) | 42 | 6 | (England) Birmingham City | 25 March 2004 | Free transfer |
| 23 | Tristan Toney | FW | (England) | | 4 February 1984 (aged 19) | 0 | 0 | Youth team | 1 July 2002 | Free transfer |

== Transfers ==
=== In ===
| Date | Position | Nationality | Name | From | Fee | Ref. |
|---|---|---|---|---|---|---|
| 1 July 2003 | MF/FW | (England) | Liam Coleman | Youth team | Free transfer | |
| 1 July 2003 | WG | (England) | Phil Hadland | (England) Leek Town | Free transfer | |
| 1 July 2003 | FB | (England) | John White | Youth team | Free transfer | |
| 2 July 2003 | FW | (England) | Wayne Andrews | (England) Oldham Athletic | Free transfer | |
| 11 July 2003 | CB/FB | (England) | Andy Myers | (England) Bradford City | Free transfer | |
| 15 October 2003 | FW | (England) | Jermaine Brown | (England) Arsenal | Free transfer | |
| 27 October 2003 | MF | (Australia) | Richard Johnson | (England) Watford | Free transfer | |
| 25 November 2003 | FW | (England) | Jamie Cade | (England) Middlesbrough | Free transfer | |
| 25 March 2004 | FW | (England) | Craig Fagan | (England) Birmingham City | Free transfer | |
| 14 April 2004 | CB | (England) | Ross Crouch | Youth team | Free transfer | |

- Total spending: ▼ ~ £0

=== Out ===
| Date | Position | Nationality | Name | To | Fee | Ref. |
|---|---|---|---|---|---|---|
| End of season | MF | (England) | Marc Canham | (England) Team Bath | Released | |
| 1 June 2003 | CB | (England) | Mark Warren | (England) Southend United | Free transfer | |
| 30 June 2003 | FW | (England) | Ben Cranfield | (England) Braintree Town | Released | |
| 30 June 2003 | MF | (England) | Matt Hearn | Free agent | Released | |
| 1 July 2003 | FW | (Cameroon) | Mvondo Atangana | (England) Grays Athletic | Released | |
| 1 July 2003 | FB | (Republic of Ireland) | Joe Dunne | Free agent | Retired | |
| 1 July 2003 | MF | (England) | Chris Keeble | (England) Heybridge Swifts | Released | |
| 1 July 2003 | MF | (England) | Mick Stockwell | (England) Heybridge Swifts | Released | |
| 14 July 2003 | FW | (England) | Kevin Rapley | (England) Chester City | Released | |
| 7 August 2003 | CB | (England) | Mike Edwards | (England) Grimsby Town | Released | |
| 30 September 2003 | WG | (England) | Phil Hadland | (England) Leek Town | Free transfer | |
| 30 October 2003 | FW | (Northern Ireland) | Adrian Coote | (England) Wivenhoe Town | Released | |
| 4 November 2003 | MF | (Australia) | Richard Johnson | (England) Stoke City | Released | |
| 27 November 2003 | FW | (Montserrat) | Dean Morgan | (England) Reading | Free transfer | |
| 12 January 2004 | FW | (England) | Jermaine Brown | (England) Boston United | Released | |

- Total incoming: ▲ ~ £0

=== Loans in ===
| Date | Position | Nationality | Name | From | End date | Ref. |
|---|---|---|---|---|---|---|
| 5 August 2003 | FW | (England) | Craig Fagan | (England) Birmingham City | 24 March 2004 | |
| 7 August 2003 | FW | (England) | Rowan Vine | (England) Portsmouth | 9 May 2004 | |
| 26 August 2003 | CB | (England) | Liam Chilvers | (England) Arsenal | 9 May 2004 | |
| 29 January 2004 | FB | (Republic of Ireland) | Paul Tierney | (England) Manchester United | 29 February 2004 | |
| 12 February 2004 | CB | (England) | Wayne Brown | (England) Watford | 9 May 2004 | |
| 22 March 2004 | FW | (Wales) | Gareth Williams | (England) Crystal Palace | 9 May 2004 | |

=== Loans out ===
| Date | Position | Nationality | Name | To | End date | Ref. |
|---|---|---|---|---|---|---|
| 5 December 2003 | CB | (England) | Pat Baldwin | (England) St Albans City | 5 January 2004 | |
| 15 March 2004 | CB | (Republic of Ireland) | Scott Fitzgerald | (England) Brentford | 9 May 2004 | |

== Match details ==
=== Second Division ===
==== League table ====
| Pos | Team | Pld | W | D | L | GF | GA | GD | Pts |
|---|---|---|---|---|---|---|---|---|---|
| 9 | Bournemouth | 46 | 17 | 15 | 14 | 56 | 51 | +5 | 66 |
| 10 | Luton Town | 46 | 17 | 15 | 14 | 69 | 66 | +3 | 66 |
| 11 | Colchester United | 46 | 17 | 13 | 16 | 52 | 56 | −4 | 64 |
| 12 | Barnsley | 46 | 15 | 17 | 14 | 54 | 58 | −4 | 62 |
| 13 | Wrexham | 46 | 17 | 9 | 20 | 50 | 60 | −10 | 60 |

Rules for classification: In the Football League goals scored (GF) takes precedence over goal difference (GD).

==== Results round by round ====
| Round | 1 | 2 | 3 | 4 | 5 | 6 | 7 | 8 | 9 | 10 | 11 | 12 | 13 | 14 | 15 | 16 | 17 | 18 | 19 | 20 | 21 | 22 | 23 | 24 | 25 | 26 | 27 | 28 | 29 | 30 | 31 | 32 | 33 | 34 | 35 | 36 | 37 | 38 | 39 | 40 | 41 | 42 | 43 | 44 | 45 | 46 |
|---|---|---|---|---|---|---|---|---|---|---|---|---|---|---|---|---|---|---|---|---|---|---|---|---|---|---|---|---|---|---|---|---|---|---|---|---|---|---|---|---|---|---|---|---|---|---|
| Ground | A | H | A | H | A | H | H | A | A | H | H | A | H | A | A | H | A | H | A | H | H | A | H | A | H | A | A | H | A | H | H | H | H | A | H | A | A | H | A | A | H | A | H | A | H | A |
| Result | L | L | L | W | D | D | W | W | W | W | D | L | D | L | W | W | W | W | L | L | W | D | D | L | D | L | L | D | L | W | L | W | L | D | D | L | W | D | D | D | W | L | W | W | W | L |
| Position | 18 | 21 | 21 | 19 | 19 | 18 | 15 | 13 | 11 | 6 | 6 | 10 | 13 | 13 | 10 | 8 | 3 | 4 | 5 | 8 | 5 | 5 | 6 | 9 | 10 | 11 | 13 | 14 | 14 | 14 | 15 | 14 | 15 | 13 | 14 | 14 | 12 | 13 | 13 | 12 | 12 | 13 | 13 | 11 | 11 | 11 |

Source: Statto.com (archived)
A = Away; H = Home; W = Win; D = Draw; L = Loss

==== Matches ====
| 9 August 2003 1 | Barnsley | 1–0 | Colchester United | Barnsley |
| | Gorré 47' (pen.) | Report | | Stadium: Oakwell; Attendance: 8,450; Referee: Colin Webster |

| 15 August 2003 2 | Colchester United | 0–1 | Swindon Town | Colchester |
| 19:45 BST | | Report | Mooney 87' | Stadium: Layer Road; Attendance: 3,339; Referee: P Crossley |

| 23 August 2003 3 | Port Vale | 4–3 | Colchester United | Burslem |
| 15:00 BST | Collins 34'; Paynter 58'; Armstrong 71'; McPhee 73' | Report | McGleish 26', 38'; Andrews 88' | Stadium: Vale Park; Attendance: 5,133; Referee: Trevor Parkes |

| 26 August 2003 4 | Colchester United | 2–1 | Bristol City | Colchester |
| 19:45 BST | McGleish 47', 55' | Report | Peacock 66' | Stadium: Layer Road; Attendance: 3,079; Referee: M Cooper |

| 30 August 2003 5 | Tranmere Rovers | 1–1 | Colchester United | Birkenhead |
| 15:00 BST | Jones 14'; Dadi (red card) 81' | Report | Andrews 30' | Stadium: Prenton Park; Attendance: 6,745; Referee: Eddie Evans |

| 6 September 2003 6 | Colchester United | 2–2 | Queens Park Rangers | Colchester |
| 15:00 BST | Vine 10'; McGleish 75' (pen.) | Report | Furlong 49', 66' | Stadium: Layer Road; Attendance: 3,835; Referee: P Armstrong |

| 13 September 2003 7 | Colchester United | 1–0 | Brighton & Hove Albion | Colchester |
| 15:00 BST | Andrews 67' | Report | | Stadium: Layer Road; Attendance: 4,169; Referee: Matt Messias |

| 16 September 2003 8 | Wycombe Wanderers | 1–2 | Colchester United | High Wycombe |
| | Currie 51' (pen.); Johnson (red card) 90'; Roberts (red card) 90' | Report | Andrews 25'; Vine 27'; Myers (yellow card) 55' (red card) | Stadium: Adams Park; Attendance: 4,401; Referee: M Ryan |

| 20 September 2003 9 | Peterborough United | 1–2 | Colchester United | Peterborough |
| 15:00 BST | Wood 57'; Rea (yellow card) 67' (red card) | Report | Fagan 36'; Keith 90' | Stadium: London Road Stadium; Attendance: 4,690; Referee: Mike Jones |

| 27 September 2003 10 | Colchester United | 1–0 | AFC Bournemouth | Colchester |
| 15:00 BST | Duguid 75' | Report | Cummings (red card) 45' | Stadium: Layer Road; Attendance: 3,602; Referee: Fraser Stretton |

| 30 September 2003 11 | Colchester United | 1–1 | Brentford | Colchester |
| 19:45 BST | Vine 76' | Report | Rougier 36' | Stadium: Layer Road; Attendance: 3,343; Referee: M Fletcher |

| 4 October 2003 12 | Notts County | 3–0 | Colchester United | Nottingham |
| | Heffernan 23', 86'; Riley 76' | Report | | Stadium: Meadow Lane; Attendance: 4,187; Referee: Scott Mathieson |

| 11 October 2003 13 | Colchester United | 1–1 | Blackpool | Colchester |
| 15:00 BST | Andrews 2' | Report | Taylor 53' | Stadium: Layer Road; Attendance: 3,265; Referee: Iain Williamson |

| 18 October 2003 14 | Grimsby Town | 2–0 | Colchester United | Cleethorpes |
| 15:00 BST | Onuora 41'; Boulding 53' | Report | | Stadium: Blundell Park; Attendance: 5,021; Referee: Phil Joslin |

| 21 October 2003 15 | Stockport County | 1–3 | Colchester United | Stockport |
| | Goodwin 58' (pen.) | Report | Fagan 26'; Andrews 34'; Vine 47' | Stadium: Edgeley Park; Attendance: 3,683; Referee: Kevin Friend |

| 25 October 2003 16 | Colchester United | 1–0 | Chesterfield | Colchester |
| 15:00 BST | Andrews 10' | Report | Uhlenbeek (yellow card) 89' (red card) | Stadium: Layer Road; Attendance: 3,115; Referee: Clive Penton |

| 31 October 2003 17 | Wrexham | 0–1 | Colchester United | Wrexham |
| 19:45 GMT | | Report | Andrews 35' | Stadium: Racecourse Ground; Attendance: 4,269; Referee: Phil Prosser |

| 15 November 2003 18 | Colchester United | 3–1 | Sheffield Wednesday | Colchester |
| 15:00 GMT | McGleish 27'; Andrews 81'; Fagan 90' | Report | Bromby 58' | Stadium: Layer Road; Attendance: 5,018; Referee: Paul Danson |

| 22 November 2003 19 | Rushden & Diamonds | 4–0 | Colchester United | Irthlingborough |
| 15:00 GMT | Lowe 4'; Gray 39'; Burgess 58'; Bignot 81' | Report | Fagan (red card) 28' | Stadium: Nene Park; Attendance: 4,149; Referee: Andy Hall |

| 29 November 2003 20 | Colchester United | 0–2 | Plymouth Argyle | Colchester |
| 15:00 GMT | | Report | Capaldi 4'; Keith 11' | Stadium: Layer Road; Attendance: 4,332; Referee: Kevin Wright |

| 13 December 2003 21 | Colchester United | 2–1 | Oldham Athletic | Colchester |
| 15:00 GMT | Duguid 48'; Vine 72' | Report | Eyres 66' | Stadium: Layer Road; Attendance: 2,897; Referee: Paul Robinson |

| 20 December 2003 22 | Hartlepool United | 0–0 | Colchester United | Hartlepool |
| | | Report | A White (red card) 3' | Stadium: Victoria Park; Attendance: 4,135; Referee: Anthony Leake |

| 26 December 2003 23 | Colchester United | 1–1 | Luton Town | Colchester |
| 15:00 GMT | McGleish 12' | Report | Mansell 28' | Stadium: Layer Road; Attendance: 5,083; Referee: Joe Ross |

| 28 December 2003 24 | Queens Park Rangers | 2–0 | Colchester United | Shepherd's Bush |
| 15:00 GMT | Gallen 12'; Thorpe 57' | Report | Duguid (red card) 33' | Stadium: Loftus Road; Attendance: 15,720; Referee: Eddie Evans |

| 10 January 2004 25 | Colchester United | 1–1 | Barnsley | Colchester |
| 15:00 GMT | Andrews 25'; Duguid (red card) 81' | Report | Betsy 78' | Stadium: Layer Road; Attendance: 3,507; Referee: Clive Penton |

| 17 January 2004 26 | Swindon Town | 2–0 | Colchester United | Swindon |
| | Parkin 15'; Mooney 46' | Report | | Stadium: County Ground; Attendance: 6,014; Referee: Steve Tomlin |

| 27 January 2004 27 | Bristol City | 1–0 | Colchester United | Bristol |
| | Goodfellow 45' | Report | Fagan (yellow card) 86' (red card) | Stadium: Ashton Gate Stadium; Attendance: 10,733; Referee: Fraser Stretton |

| 31 January 2004 28 | Colchester United | 1–1 | Tranmere Rovers | Colchester |
| 15:00 GMT | Izzet 89' | Report | Dadi 27'; Mellon (yellow card) 44' (red card) | Stadium: Layer Road; Attendance: 3,099; Referee: Andy Penn |

| 7 February 2004 29 | Luton Town | 1–0 | Colchester United | Luton |
| 15:00 GMT | Showunmi 52' | Report | | Stadium: Kenilworth Road; Attendance: 5,662; Referee: Eddie Ilderton |

| 21 February 2004 30 | Colchester United | 2–0 | Grimsby Town | Colchester |
| 15:00 GMT | Fagan 65'; Izzet 90' | Report | | Stadium: Layer Road; Attendance: 2,922; Referee: M Fletcher |

| 24 February 2004 31 | Colchester United | 1–4 | Port Vale | Colchester |
| 19:45 GMT | McGleish 10' | Report | Brooker 13'; S. Brown 24' (o.g.); Cummins 27'; Bridge-Wilkinson 73' | Stadium: Layer Road; Attendance: 2,539; Referee: Paul Danson |

| 2 March 2004 32 | Colchester United | 2–1 | Stockport County | Colchester |
| 19:45 GMT | Vine 50'; Andrews 60' | Report | Lambert 46' | Stadium: Layer Road; Attendance: 2,513; Referee: A Butler |

| 6 March 2004 33 | Colchester United | 1–2 | Hartlepool United | Colchester |
| 15:00 GMT | Halford 35' | Report | Nelson 17'; Istead 78' | Stadium: Layer Road; Attendance: 3,348; Referee: Trevor Kettle |

| 13 March 2004 34 | Oldham Athletic | 0–0 | Colchester United | Oldham |
| | | Report | | Stadium: Boundary Park; Attendance: 5,937; Referee: Mike Jones |

| 16 March 2004 35 | Colchester United | 1–1 | Wycombe Wanderers | Colchester |
| 19:45 GMT | Fagan 8' (pen.) | Report | Simpson 38' | Stadium: Layer Road; Attendance: 3,092; Referee: Lee Mason |

| 20 March 2004 36 | Brighton & Hove Albion | 2–1 | Colchester United | Brighton |
| | Iwelumo 30'; Knight 87' | Report | Izzet 69'; W. Brown (yellow card) 90' (red card) | Stadium: Withdean Stadium; Attendance: 6,156; Referee: Phil Dowd |

| 23 March 2004 37 | Chesterfield | 1–2 | Colchester United | Chesterfield |
| | Hurst 50' | Report | Halford 31'; Andrews 82' | Stadium: Saltergate; Attendance: 3,787; Referee: R Pearson |

| 27 March 2004 38 | Colchester United | 0–0 | Peterborough United | Colchester |
| 15:00 GMT | Andrews (red card) 53' | Report | | Stadium: Layer Road; Attendance: 3,754; Referee: D Crick |

| 30 March 2004 39 | Blackpool | 0–0 | Colchester United | Blackpool |
| | Coid (red card) 80' | Report | | Stadium: Bloomfield Road; Attendance: 5,473; Referee: Carl Boyeson |

| 3 April 2004 40 | AFC Bournemouth | 1–1 | Colchester United | Bournemouth |
| 15:00 BST | Hayter 86' | Report | Halford 35' | Stadium: Dean Court; Attendance: 6,896; Referee: M Cooper |

| 10 April 2004 41 | Colchester United | 4–1 | Notts County | Colchester |
| 15:00 BST | Fagan 9', 17', 53'; Williams 78' | Report | Richardson 87' | Stadium: Layer Road; Attendance: 3,782; Referee: Lee Cable |

| 12 April 2004 42 | Brentford | 3–2 | Colchester United | Brentford |
| 15:00 BST | Tabb 45'; Sonko 58'; Harrold 78' | Report; Report | A. White 53'; Fagan 80' | Stadium: Griffin Park; Attendance: 5,017; Referee: Joe Ross |

| 17 April 2004 43 | Colchester United | 3–1 | Wrexham | Colchester |
| 15:00 BST | Williams 16'; Halford 45'; McGleish 82' | Report | Sam 18' | Stadium: Layer Road; Attendance: 3,077; Referee: Andre Marriner |

| 24 April 2004 44 | Sheffield Wednesday | 0–1 | Colchester United | Sheffield |
| 15:00 BST | | Report | Keith 48' | Stadium: Hillsborough Stadium; Attendance: 20,464; Referee: Nigel Miller |

| 1 May 2004 45 | Colchester United | 2–0 | Rushden & Diamonds | Colchester |
| 15:00 BST | McGleish 80' (pen.); G. Johnson 90' | Report | Hunter (yellow card) 73' (red card) | Stadium: Layer Road; Attendance: 4,618; Referee: Grant Hegley |

| 8 May 2004 46 | Plymouth Argyle | 2–0 | Colchester United | Plymouth |
| | Friio 17' (red card) 62'; Norris 47' | Report | | Stadium: Home Park; Attendance: 19,868; Referee: Andy Hall |

=== Football League Cup ===
| 12 August 2003 1st round | Colchester United | 2–1 | Plymouth Argyle | Colchester |
| 19:45 BST | Fagan 22'; Pinault 40' | Report | Evans 24' | Stadium: Layer Road; Attendance: 2,367; Referee: Joe Ross |

| 23 September 2003 2nd round | Rotherham United | 1–0 | Colchester United | Rotherham |
| | Sedgwick 22' | Report | Chilvers (red card) 90' | Stadium: Millmoor; Attendance: 2,474; Referee: Anthony Leake |

=== Football League Trophy ===
| 14 October 2003 1st round (southern section) | Cheltenham Town | 1–3 | Colchester United | Cheltenham |
| | Devaney 18' | Report | Keith 40'; Vine 65', 88' | Stadium: Whaddon Road; Attendance: 1,324; Referee: Steve Tanner |

| 4 November 2003 2nd round (southern section) | Yeovil Town | 2–2 (a.e.t.) (2–4 p) | Colchester United | Yeovil |
| 19:45 GMT | Edwards 11'; Gall 66' | Report | Andrews 41'; McGleish 77' | Stadium: Huish Park; Attendance: 3,052; Referee: Ray Olivier |

| 9 December 2003 Quarter-final (southern section) | Wycombe Wanderers | 2–3 (a.e.t.) | Colchester United | High Wycombe |
| | Thomson 22'; Johnson 69' | Report | McGleish 8', 39'; J. Brown 120' | Stadium: Adams Park; Attendance: 1,873; Referee: M Cowburn |

| 20 January 2004 Semi-final (southern section) | Northampton Town | 2–3 (a.e.t.) | Colchester United | Northampton |
| | Walker 14', 51'; Sampson (yellow card) 57' (red card) | Report | McGleish 61', 86', 95' | Stadium: Sixfields Stadium; Attendance: 4,304; Referee: P Crossley |

| 10 February 2004 Area final (southern section) 1st leg | Colchester United | 2–3 | Southend United | Colchester |
| 20:00 GMT | Pinault 7'; Andrews 75' | Report | Constantine 17'; Broughton 42' (yellow card) 76' (red card); Bramble 68' | Stadium: Layer Road; Attendance: 5,401; Referee: Graham Laws |

| 17 February 2004 Area final (southern section) 2nd leg | Southend United | 1–1 | Colchester United | Southend-on-Sea |
| 19:45 GMT | Broughton 45' | Report | Izzet 3' | Stadium: Roots Hall; Attendance: 9,603; Referee: Michael Ryan |
Note: Southend win 4–3 on aggregate.

=== FA Cup ===
| 8 November 2003 1st round | Colchester United | 1–0 | Oxford United | Colchester |
| 15:00 GMT | McGleish 38' | Report | | Stadium: Layer Road; Attendance: 3,672; Referee: Trevor Parkes |

| 6 December 2003 2nd round | Colchester United | 1–0 | Aldershot Town | Colchester |
| 15:00 GMT | Vine 83' | Report | | Stadium: Layer Road; Attendance: 4,255; Referee: Grant Hegley |

| 3 January 2004 3rd round | Accrington Stanley | 0–0 | Colchester United | Accrington |
| | | Report | | Stadium: Crown Ground; Attendance: 4,368; Referee: Phil Joslin |

| 13 January 2004 3rd round replay | Colchester United | 2–1 | Accrington Stanley | Colchester |
| | Keith 11', 84' | Report | Mullin 89'; Halford (yellow card) 86' (red card) | Stadium: Layer Road; Attendance: 5,611; Referee: Phil Joslin |

| 24 January 2004 4th round | Coventry City | 1–1 | Colchester United | Coventry |
| 15:00 GMT | Joachim 33' | Report | Adebola 30' (o.g.) | Stadium: Highfield Road; Attendance: 15,341; Referee: Mark Clattenburg |

| 3 February 2004 4th round replay | Colchester United | 3–1 | Coventry City | Colchester |
| 20:00 GMT | Vine 12', 43', 57' | Report | Joachim 25'; Davenport (yellow card) 87' (red card) | Stadium: Layer Road; Attendance: 5,530; Referee: Anthony Leake |

| 15 February 2004 5th round | Sheffield United | 1–0 | Colchester United | Sheffield |
| 14:00 GMT | Peschisolido 61' | Report | | Stadium: Bramall Lane; Attendance: 17,074; Referee: D Pugh |

== Squad statistics ==
=== Appearances and goals ===
| No. | Pos | Nat | Player | Total | | Second Division | | FA Cup | | League Cup | | Football League Trophy | |
| No. | Pos | Nat | Player | Apps | Goals | Apps | Goals | Apps | Goals | Apps | Goals | Apps | Goals |
|---|---|---|---|---|---|---|---|---|---|---|---|---|---|
| 1 | GK | (England) ENG | Simon Brown | 53 | 0 | 40 | 0 | 6 | 0 | 2 | 0 | 5 | 0 |
| 2 | DF | (England) ENG | Andy Myers | 26 | 0 | 21 | 0 | 2 | 0 | 1 | 0 | 2 | 0 |
| 3 | DF | (England) ENG | Joe Keith | 41 | 5 | 16+12 | 2 | 4+1 | 2 | 2 | 0 | 5+1 | 1 |
| 4 | MF | (England) ENG | Gavin Johnson | 21 | 1 | 14+4 | 1 | 1 | 0 | 0 | 0 | 1+1 | 0 |
| 5 | DF | (Republic of Ireland) IRL | Scott Fitzgerald | 28 | 0 | 22+1 | 0 | 2 | 0 | 1 | 0 | 2 | 0 |
| 6 | MF | (France) FRA | Thomas Pinault | 54 | 2 | 31+9 | 0 | 7 | 0 | 1+1 | 1 | 5 | 1 |
| 7 | MF | (England) ENG | Karl Duguid | 42 | 2 | 30 | 2 | 6 | 0 | 2 | 0 | 4 | 0 |
| 8 | FW | (England) ENG | Wayne Andrews | 50 | 14 | 32+9 | 12 | 4+1 | 0 | 0 | 0 | 3+1 | 2 |
| 9 | FW | (England) ENG | Scott McGleish | 48 | 17 | 25+9 | 10 | 6+1 | 1 | 1 | 0 | 4+2 | 6 |
| 10 | MF | (England) ENG | Kemal Izzet | 56 | 4 | 43+1 | 3 | 6 | 0 | 2 | 0 | 4 | 1 |
| 11 | FW | (England) ENG | Jamie Cade | 15 | 0 | 6+9 | 0 | 0 | 0 | 0 | 0 | 0 | 0 |
| 12 | FW | (England) ENG | Craig Fagan | 48 | 10 | 30+7 | 9 | 5 | 0 | 2 | 1 | 4 | 0 |
| 13 | GK | (England) ENG | Dean Gerken | 1 | 0 | 1 | 0 | 0 | 0 | 0 | 0 | 0 | 0 |
| 17 | MF | (Saint Kitts and Nevis) SKN | Bobby Bowry | 30 | 0 | 18+6 | 0 | 1+1 | 0 | 1 | 0 | 2+1 | 0 |
| 19 | DF | (England) ENG | Alan White | 46 | 1 | 30+3 | 1 | 5+1 | 0 | 2 | 0 | 5 | 0 |
| 22 | DF | (England) ENG | Greg Halford | 24 | 4 | 15+3 | 4 | 2 | 0 | 0 | 0 | 4 | 0 |
| 24 | DF | (England) ENG | Pat Baldwin | 7 | 0 | 1+3 | 0 | 0 | 0 | 1 | 0 | 0+2 | 0 |
| 25 | DF | (England) ENG | Sam Stockley | 58 | 0 | 44 | 0 | 6 | 0 | 2 | 0 | 5+1 | 0 |
| 31 | GK | (Northern Ireland) NIR | Richard McKinney | 7 | 0 | 5 | 0 | 1 | 0 | 0 | 0 | 1 | 0 |
Players who appeared for Colchester who left during the season
| 11 | MF | (Australia) AUS | Richard Johnson | 1 | 0 | 0 | 0 | 0 | 0 | 0 | 0 | 0+1 | 0 |
| 15 | FW | (Northern Ireland) NIR | Adrian Coote | 1 | 0 | 0 | 0 | 0 | 0 | 0+1 | 0 | 0 | 0 |
| 16 | FW | (England) ENG | Rowan Vine | 49 | 12 | 30+5 | 6 | 5+2 | 4 | 1 | 0 | 4+2 | 2 |
| 18 | DF | (England) ENG | Liam Chilvers | 45 | 0 | 29+3 | 0 | 7 | 0 | 1 | 0 | 5 | 0 |
| 20 | FW | (England) ENG | Jermaine Brown | 1 | 1 | 0 | 0 | 0 | 0 | 0 | 0 | 0+1 | 1 |
| 20 | FW | (England) ENG | Phil Hadland | 2 | 0 | 0+1 | 0 | 0 | 0 | 0 | 0 | 0+1 | 0 |
| 26 | DF | (Republic of Ireland) IRL | Paul Tierney | 4 | 0 | 2 | 0 | 1 | 0 | 0 | 0 | 1 | 0 |
| 26 | FW | (Wales) WAL | Gareth Williams | 7 | 2 | 5+2 | 2 | 0 | 0 | 0 | 0 | 0 | 0 |
| 27 | DF | (England) ENG | Wayne Brown | 17 | 0 | 16 | 0 | 0 | 0 | 0 | 0 | 0+1 | 0 |

=== Goalscorers ===
| Place | Number | Nationality | Position | Name | Second Division | FA Cup | League Cup | Football League Trophy | Total |
|---|---|---|---|---|---|---|---|---|---|
| 1 | 9 | (England) | FW | Scott McGleish | 10 | 1 | 0 | 6 | 17 |
| 2 | 8 | (England) | FW | Wayne Andrews | 12 | 0 | 0 | 2 | 14 |
| 3 | 16 | (England) | FW | Rowan Vine | 6 | 4 | 0 | 2 | 12 |
| 4 | 12 | (England) | FW | Craig Fagan | 9 | 0 | 1 | 0 | 10 |
| 5 | 3 | (England) | FB | Joe Keith | 2 | 2 | 0 | 1 | 5 |
| 6 | 10 | (England) | MF | Kemal Izzet | 3 | 0 | 0 | 1 | 4 |
| 6 | 22 | (England) | FB/MF | Greg Halford | 4 | 0 | 0 | 0 | 4 |
| 8 | 6 | (France) | MF | Thomas Pinault | 0 | 0 | 1 | 1 | 2 |
| 8 | 7 | (England) | MF | Karl Duguid | 2 | 0 | 0 | 0 | 2 |
| 8 | 26 | (Wales) | FW | Gareth Williams | 2 | 0 | 0 | 0 | 2 |
| 11 | 4 | (England) | MF | Gavin Johnson | 1 | 0 | 0 | 0 | 1 |
| 11 | 19 | (England) | CB | Alan White | 1 | 0 | 0 | 0 | 1 |
| 11 | 20 | (England) | FW | Jermaine Brown | 0 | 0 | 0 | 1 | 1 |
| | | | | Own goals | 0 | 1 | 0 | 0 | 1 |
| | | | | TOTALS | 52 | 8 | 2 | 14 | 76 |

=== Disciplinary record ===
| Number | Nationality | Position | Name | Second Division | | FA Cup | | League Cup | | Football League Trophy | | Total | |
| Number | Nationality | Position | Name | Booked | Sent off (straight red) | Booked | Sent off (straight red) | Booked | Sent off (straight red) | Booked | Sent off (straight red) | Booked | Sent off (straight red) |
|---|---|---|---|---|---|---|---|---|---|---|---|---|---|
| 12 | (England) | FW | Craig Fagan | 9 | 2 | 1 | 0 | 1 | 0 | 1 | 0 | 12 | 2 |
| 7 | (England) | MF | Karl Duguid | 4 | 2 | 2 | 0 | 1 | 0 | 0 | 0 | 7 | 2 |
| 19 | (England) | CB | Alan White | 5 | 1 | 1 | 0 | 0 | 0 | 1 | 0 | 7 | 1 |
| 10 | (England) | MF | Kemal Izzet | 7 | 0 | 1 | 0 | 0 | 0 | 1 | 0 | 9 | 0 |
| 16 | (England) | FW | Rowan Vine | 7 | 0 | 1 | 0 | 0 | 0 | 1 | 0 | 9 | 0 |
| 8 | (England) | FW | Wayne Andrews | 5 | 1 | 0 | 0 | 0 | 0 | 0 | 0 | 5 | 1 |
| 18 | (England) | CB | Liam Chilvers | 4 | 0 | 0 | 0 | 0 | 1 | 0 | 0 | 4 | 1 |
| 25 | (England) | FB | Sam Stockley | 4 | 0 | 1 | 0 | 1 | 0 | 1 | 0 | 7 | 0 |
| 27 | (England) | CB | Wayne Brown | 3 | 1 | 0 | 0 | 0 | 0 | 0 | 0 | 3 | 1 |
| 2 | (England) | CB/FB | Andy Myers | 2 | 1 | 0 | 0 | 0 | 0 | 0 | 0 | 2 | 1 |
| 6 | (France) | MF | Thomas Pinault | 4 | 0 | 0 | 0 | 1 | 0 | 0 | 0 | 5 | 0 |
| 17 | (Saint Kitts and Nevis) | MF | Bobby Bowry | 4 | 0 | 0 | 0 | 0 | 0 | 0 | 0 | 4 | 0 |
| 1 | (England) | GK | Simon Brown | 1 | 0 | 0 | 0 | 1 | 0 | 0 | 0 | 2 | 0 |
| 3 | (England) | FB | Joe Keith | 1 | 0 | 1 | 0 | 0 | 0 | 0 | 0 | 2 | 0 |
| 9 | (England) | FW | Scott McGleish | 2 | 0 | 0 | 0 | 0 | 0 | 0 | 0 | 2 | 0 |
| 4 | (England) | MF | Gavin Johnson | 0 | 0 | 0 | 0 | 0 | 0 | 1 | 0 | 1 | 0 |
| 5 | (Republic of Ireland) | CB | Scott Fitzgerald | 1 | 0 | 0 | 0 | 0 | 0 | 0 | 0 | 1 | 0 |
| 22 | (England) | FB/MF | Greg Halford | 1 | 0 | 0 | 0 | 0 | 0 | 0 | 0 | 1 | 0 |
| 24 | (England) | CB | Pat Baldwin | 0 | 0 | 0 | 0 | 1 | 0 | 0 | 0 | 1 | 0 |
| 26 | (Republic of Ireland) | FB | Paul Tierney | 0 | 0 | 1 | 0 | 0 | 0 | 0 | 0 | 1 | 0 |
| | | | TOTALS | 64 | 8 | 9 | 0 | 6 | 1 | 6 | 0 | 85 | 9 |

=== Clean sheets ===
Number of games goalkeepers kept a clean sheet.

| Place | Number | Nationality | Player | Second Division | FA Cup | League Cup | Football League Trophy | Total |
|---|---|---|---|---|---|---|---|---|
| 1 | 1 | (England) | Simon Brown | 10 | 3 | 0 | 0 | 13 |
| 2 | 31 | (Northern Ireland) | Richard McKinney | 1 | 0 | 0 | 0 | 1 |
| | | | TOTALS | 11 | 3 | 0 | 0 | 14 |

=== Player debuts ===
Players making their first-team Colchester United debut in a fully competitive match.

| Number | Position | Nationality | Player | Date | Opponent | Ground | Notes |
|---|---|---|---|---|---|---|---|
| 2 | CB/FB | (England) | Andy Myers | 9 August 2003 | Barnsley | Oakwell | |
| 12 | FW | (England) | Craig Fagan | 9 August 2003 | Barnsley | Oakwell | |
| 16 | FW | (England) | Rowan Vine | 9 August 2003 | Barnsley | Oakwell | |
| 20 | WG | (England) | Phil Hadland | 15 August 2003 | Swindon Town | Layer Road | |
| 8 | FW | (England) | Wayne Andrews | 23 August 2003 | Port Vale | Vale Park | |
| 18 | CB | (England) | Liam Chilvers | 30 August 2003 | Tranmere Rovers | Prenton Park | (Note: Second debut for the club) |
| 11 | MF | (Australia) | Richard Johnson | 4 November 2003 | Yeovil Town | Huish Park | |
| 20 | FW | (England) | Jermaine Brown | 9 December 2003 | Wycombe Wanderers | Adams Park | |
| 11 | FW | (England) | Jamie Cade | 13 December 2003 | Oldham Athletic | Layer Road | |
| 26 | FB | (Republic of Ireland) | Paul Tierney | 31 January 2004 | Tranmere Rovers | Layer Road | |
| 27 | CB | (England) | Wayne Brown | 17 February 2004 | Southend United | Roots Hall | |
| 12 | FW | (England) | Craig Fagan | 27 March 2004 | Peterborough United | Layer Road | |
| 26 | FW | (Wales) | Gareth Williams | 27 March 2004 | Peterborough United | Layer Road | |
| 13 | GK | (England) | Dean Gerken | 12 April 2004 | Brentford | Griffin Park | |

== See also ==
- List of Colchester United F.C. seasons
