= Craig Fagan =

English footballer (born 1982)

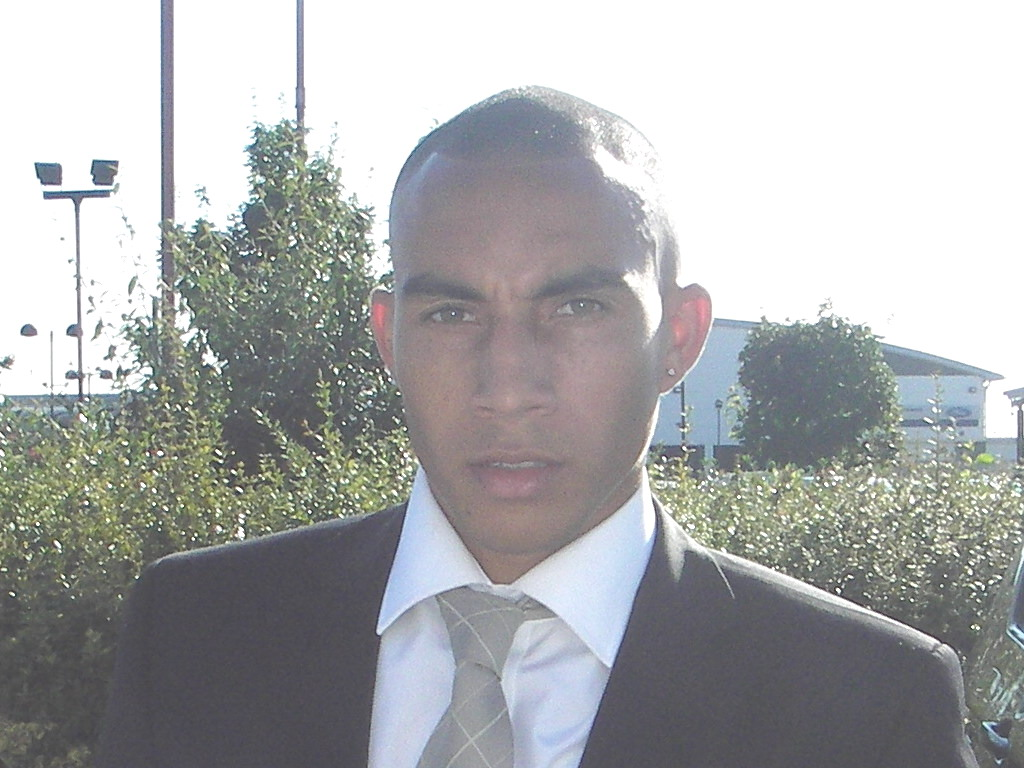
- Fagan in 2007

Personal information
- Full name: Craig Anthony Fagan
- Date of birth: 11 December 1982 (age 43)
- Place of birth: Birmingham, England
- Height: 5 ft 11 in (1.80 m)
- Positions: Winger; forward

Team information
- Current team: Maidstone United (manager)

Senior career*
Years	Team	Apps	(Gls)
2002–2004	Birmingham City	1	(0)
2003	→ Bristol City (loan)	6	(1)
2003–2004	→ Colchester United (loan)	31	(5)
2004–2005	Colchester United	32	(12)
2005–2007	Hull City	80	(15)
2007–2008	Derby County	39	(1)
2008	→ Hull City (loan)	8	(0)
2008–2011	Hull City	52	(5)
2011–2012	Bradford City	31	(7)
2013	Bury	11	(1)
2013–2014	Gillingham	18	(2)
2015	DPMM	3	(0)
Total		312	(49)

Managerial career
- 2026–: Maidstone United
- * Club domestic league appearances and goals

Craig Anthony Fagan (born 11 December 1982) is an English football manager and former player who is the manager of National League South club Maidstone United.

He played as a winger or forward, notably in the Premier League for Birmingham City, Derby County and Hull City.

== Club career ==
=== Early career ===
Fagan began his football career as an under-nine with Birmingham City. When the club dismantled its youth system he spent a few months with West Bromwich Albion, but returned to Birmingham City when they opened their academy, in part because the club was nearer to his home in Bromsgrove, Worcestershire, where he attended Catshill Middle School and South Bromsgrove High School. Fagan made his Birmingham debut as a substitute in a League Cup tie against Leyton Orient on 2 October 2002. His Premier League debut followed two months later, again as a substitute, against Southampton. He scored his first career goal while on loan at Bristol City in a 2–1 defeat against Colchester United, his future club. He failed to make the breakthrough to Birmingham's first team, and joined Colchester United on a free transfer in March 2004 after a successful loan spell at the club.

=== Hull City ===
Fagan joined Hull City on 28 February 2005 for an undisclosed six-figure transfer fee (believed to be around £125,000). Five days later he scored on his debut in a 3–1 victory over Tranmere Rovers. He was reunited with his former Colchester boss, Phil Parkinson, when Parkinson was appointed Hull City manager in the summer of 2006 – Parkinson's tenure however did not last long. Under Parkinson, Fagan was played on the right wing, whereas under Peter Taylor he had played as a striker. Following Parkinson's departure, Hull changed from a 4-4-2 formation to 4-3-3, and Fagan flourished in his role on the right hand side of the front three.

His good form led to interest from other clubs and speculation around his future arose when he was left out of the squad for the FA Cup Third Round tie against Middlesbrough on 6 January 2007. Finally, on 9 January, top of the table Derby County confirmed the signing of Fagan for a fee of £750,000, rising to £1,000,000 dependent on their promotion to the Premiership.

Despite leaving halfway through the season, Fagan led the assists chart for Hull in 2006–07, as he had the previous campaign.

=== Derby County ===
Upon joining Derby, Fagan quickly worked his way into the first team and made his debut in a 1–0 win over Sheffield Wednesday on 13 January 2007; he had made his final appearance for Hull against the same opponents 12 days previously, a game which Fagan was also on the winning side. Fagan was mostly employed as a wide player whilst at Derby, rather than his preferred role as striker, with boss Billy Davies preferring to employ Steve Howard in the lone striker role. He made 17 league and one cup appearances, scoring only once, in the 1–1 draw away to Leicester City, as Derby's form faltered and they fell into the playoff positions, finishing in third. Fagan then went on to play in all three matches in Derby's successful playoff campaign, including the 1–0 win over West Bromwich Albion in the 2007 Championship play-off final.

Whilst Derby's return to the Premiership proved to be a difficult one, as they found themselves bottom of the table for the majority of the season, Fagan himself was consistently involved in the first team and, alongside Stephen Pearson, was top of the club's appearance chart on 1 March 2008 with 25 league and cup appearances, scoring once in the League Cup against Blackpool, although he was mainly used on the wing rather than striker. It may have been more had he not been banned twice, once for four matches for a stamp on Liverpool's Álvaro Arbeloa in a 6–0 defeat at Anfield and then for one match after reaching five yellow cards. As part of new manager Paul Jewell's clearout upon his arrival at the club following the departure of Billy Davies, Fagan moved on loan to Hull City on 7 March 2008, with a view to a permanent deal.

=== Return to Hull City ===
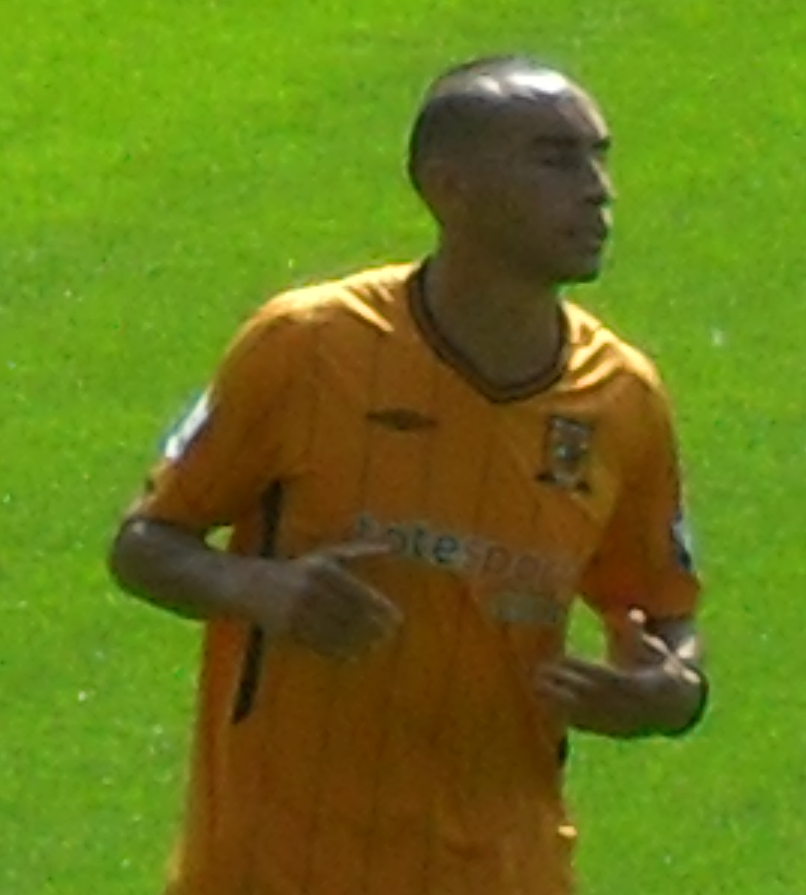
Fagan playing for Hull City in 2009

Fagan made his second debut for Hull in a 2–0 win over Scunthorpe United on 8 March 2008 and was part of the side which eventually secured the club's first ever season in the top flight of English football, following a 1–0 win over Bristol City at Wembley in the 2008 Championship play-off final, in which Fagan appeared as a 67th-minute substitute. It was Fagan's second consecutive appearance in the Championship Playoff final following playing for Derby there the previous year. Derby manager Paul Jewell announced on 17 June 2008 that the deal to take Fagan back to Hull on a permanent transfer had been agreed, with the fee believed to be £750,000. This was completed on 2 July.

On Saturday 13 September 2008, Fagan suffered a broken tibia after being on the end of an "horrific tackle" by Newcastle United midfielder Danny Guthrie. Guthrie was sent off in the incident, which occurred in the closing stages of Hull's victory at St James' Park. He returned to action on 26 December 2008 and scored Hull's only goal in a heavy defeat to Manchester City.

Following Hull City's return to the Championship Fagan spent all of the 2010–11 season sidelined through injury. After the end of the season, on 10 May 2011, the club announced that Fagan had been released from Hull City along with three other players, ending his second stint at the East Riding of Yorkshire club.

During the close season, Fagan had trials at Championship clubs Cardiff City and Crystal Palace.

=== Bradford City ===
He signed for Bradford City on 15 September 2011. On 8 October 2011 Fagan scored his first goal for Bradford City against Torquay United. He scored his second goal for the Bantams in a 2–1 win over Northampton Town. His third goal came from the penalty spot in a 3–1 win against AFC Wimbledon in the FA Cup on 3 December. In the next game he missed a penalty in a defeat to Oldham Athletic in the Football League Trophy. He scored his fourth goal of the season with a volley in a 3–1 win over Shrewsbury Town. He scored again against Torquay, this time in a 2–1 away win on 18 February. This was his fifth goal for the Bantams. On 1 May 2012, it was announced that he would leave the club after one season, settling his contract early.

=== Bury ===
In February 2013, Fagan signed for League One Bury until the end of the season.

=== Gillingham ===
On 12 November 2013, Fagan signed for Gillingham. He was released by the club at the end of the 2013–14 season.

=== DPMM ===
In February 2015, Fagan joined Brunei DPMM of the Singaporean S.League. However, he suffered a long-term injury in only his third game and was subsequently released.

== Coaching career ==
On 5 July 2018, Fagan was appointed to the coaching staff of Hull City's Academy. In 2019 Fagan replaced the departing Kevin Maher as under-23 coach at Southend United.

In August 2020, Fagan applied to become the manager of the first team of Southend United. It was later decided by the club that he would not get the role but would continue as the under-23s coach. He later went on to get promoted to assistant manager.

In February 2023, Fagan was appointed assistant manager of National League South club Maidstone United, assisting George Elokobi. In April 2026, following the announcement that Elokobi would depart the club at the end of the season, Fagan was appointed manager.

== Career statistics ==
Appearances and goals by club, season and competition
Club	Season	League			National Cup (Note: Includes FA Cup)		League Cup (Note: Includes League Cup)		Other		Total	
Club	Season	Division	Apps	Goals	Apps	Goals	Apps	Goals	Apps	Goals	Apps	Goals
Birmingham City	2002–03	Premier League	1	0	1	0	2	0	—		4	0
Birmingham City	2003–04	Premier League	—		—		—		—		—	
Birmingham City	Total		1	0	1	0	2	0	—		4	0
Bristol City (loan)	2002–03	Second Division	6	1	—		—		1 (Note: Appearance(s) in Football League Trophy)	0	7	1
Colchester United	2003–04	Second Division	37	9	5	0	2	1	4	0	48	10
Colchester United	2004–05	League One	26	8	5	4	3	2	0	0	34	14
Colchester United	Total		63	17	10	4	5	3	4	0	82	24
Hull City	2004–05	League One	12	4	—		—		—		12	4
Hull City	2005–06	Championship	41	5	1	0	1	0	—		43	5
Hull City	2006–07	Championship	27	6	—		2	0	—		29	6
Hull City	Total		80	15	1	0	3	0	—		84	15
Derby County	2006–07	Championship	17	1	1	0	—		3 (Note: Appearances in Championship play-offs)	0	21	1
Derby County	2007–08	Premier League	22	0	2	0	1	1	—		25	1
Derby County	Total		39	1	3	0	1	1	3	0	46	2
Hull City (loan)	2007–08	Championship	8	0	—		—		3	0	11	0
Hull City	2008–09	Premier League	22	3	3	0	0	0	—		25	3
Hull City	2009–10	Premier League	25	2	0	0	1	0	—		26	2
Hull City	2010–11	Championship	5	0	0	0	0	0	—		5	0
Hull City	Total		52	5	3	0	1	0	3	0	59	5
Bradford City	2011–12	League Two	31	7	2	1	0	0	2	0	35	8
Bury	2012–13	League One	11	1	—		—		—		11	1
Gillingham	2013–14	League One	18	2	—		—		—		18	2
DPMM FC	2015	S.League	3	0	—		—		—		3	0
Career total			312	49	20	5	12	4	13	0	357	58

== Honours ==
Derby County

- Football League Championship play-offs: 2007

Hull City

- Football League Championship play-offs: 2008
