= Sam Stockley =

English footballer (born 1977)

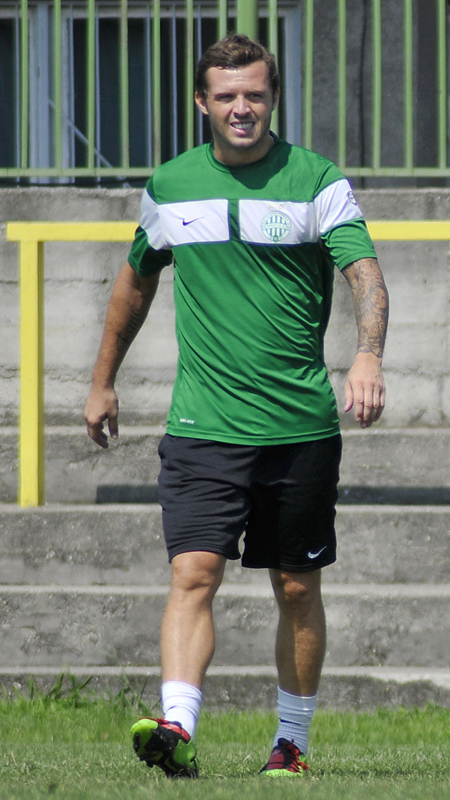
- Stockley at Ferencvárosi TC in July 2010.

Personal information
- Full name: Samuel Joshua Stockley
- Date of birth: 5 September 1977 (age 49)
- Place of birth: Tiverton, England
- Height: 1.83 m (6 ft 0 in)
- Position: Right-back

Team information
- Current team: Stoke City (U21 lead coach)

Youth career
- 1994–1996: Southampton

Senior career*
Years	Team	Apps	(Gls)
1996–2001	Barnet	182	(2)
2001–2002	Oxford United	41	(0)
2002	→ Colchester United (loan)	10	(1)
2002–2006	Colchester United	131	(2)
2006	→ Blackpool (loan)	7	(0)
2006–2008	Wycombe Wanderers	56	(1)
2008–2009	Port Vale	31	(0)
2010–2011	Ferencvárosi TC	17	(0)
2010–2011	Ferencvárosi TC II	1	(0)
2011	Telford United	0	(0)
2011	Droylsden	1	(0)
2011	F.C. New York	17	(0)
2012–2013	Carolina RailHawks	14	(0)
Total		508	(6)

Managerial career
- 2022–2023: Lexington SC (men)
- 2025: Lexington SC (women) (interim)
- * Club domestic league appearances and goals

Samuel Joshua Stockley (born 5 September 1977) is an English football coach and former professional player who is the U21 lead coach at EFL Championship club Stoke City.

A youth player at Southampton, he made his name at Barnet in the late 1990s, where he was named Player of the Year in 2001. A short time at Oxford United was followed by four years with Colchester United between 2002 and 2006. After helping Colchester to win promotion out of League One in 2005–06, he then spent two seasons with Wycombe Wanderers before signing with Port Vale in May 2008. He announced his retirement as a professional player in November 2009. However, he returned to the game in 2010 with the Hungarian side Ferencvárosi TC before becoming a non-League player in England with Droylsden via Telford United in 2011. He spent 2011 at American club F.C. New York, before joining Carolina RailHawks a year later. Throughout his 17-year professional career, he made 583 appearances in all competitions, scoring six goals.

Following his retirement, he spent seven years coaching youth players and girls in the United States. He returned to the United Kingdom in 2020 to coach at Llandudno before returning to the U.S. in 2021 as Sporting Director for Lexington SC. He returned to England to work as Stoke City's academy manager in July 2025.

== Playing career ==
=== Barnet ===
Stockley began his career as a trainee at Southampton but could not break into the first team. He moved to Third Division club Barnet during the 1996–97 season, making his debut under Terry Bullivant in a 3–0 defeat by Swansea City at Vetch Field on 14 January. He played 20 league games that season before making 49 appearances in league and cup in 1997–98. He continued to be an almost constant presence at Underhill under John Still in 1998–99 and 1999–2000, making 45 and 39 appearances respectively, and scoring his first league goal in a 3–1 win over Hull City at Boothferry Park on 24 April 2000. He played 52 games for new boss Tony Cottee in 2000–01, scoring his second senior goal on 19 August in a 3–3 home draw with Mansfield Town. He was also named the club's Player of the Year for 2001 and picked up the club's 'Most Improved Player' award. Having played 209 games for the "Bees", he was sold to Oxford United for a fee of £150,000 in July 2001 after becoming dissatisfied with his wages at Barnet.

=== Oxford to Colchester United ===
He played 44 games for Oxford under Mark Wright and Ian Atkins in 2001–02 as the "Yellows" struggled to retain their Football League status. He was loaned out to Second Division Colchester United at the start of the 2002–03 season, then managed by Steve Whitton, before moving permanently on a free transfer in October 2002. He scored his third ever goal on 29 October, in a 1–1 draw with Barnsley at Layer Road, and finished the campaign with 35 appearances to his name. He signed a new contract for Phil Parkinson's side after he missed just two of United's 60 matches in the 2003–04 season. He played 44 games in 2004–05, scoring on the opening day of the season with a "stunning strike" from 25 yards (23 m) in a 3–0 win over Sheffield Wednesday at Hillsborough in League One. He played 34 games for the "U's" in the promotion season of 2005–06, scoring his fifth career goal from 25 yards in a 3–1 defeat to Southend United at Roots Hall on 29 August. He joined Blackpool on loan in March 2006, featuring seven times for Simon Grayson's "Seasiders".

=== Wycombe Wanderers ===
After his release from Colchester following 171 appearances for the club, Stockley moved to Paul Lambert's Wycombe Wanderers of League Two in July 2006. He spent the 2006–07 season as the club's regular right-back, but also filled in as centre-back and sweeper during tactical changes. He played a total of 42 times, scoring his sixth and final league goal at London Road in a 3–3 draw with Peterborough United on 31 March. He lost his place at right-back to Russell Martin in the 2007–08 season. Still, he was often used as a left-back, featuring 23 times throughout the campaign. In February 2008, he had a trial with American club FC Dallas.

=== Port Vale ===
Stockley left Wycombe and signed for Port Vale in May 2008, signing a two-year deal. He was appointed as captain in July of that year by manager Lee Sinnott. By mid-season Stockley found himself regularly on the Vale bench under new boss Dean Glover, but said "I think that Port Vale haven't seen the best of me yet, but I believe they will because I'm really happy here". He managed to battle his way back into the first-team and win back his captaincy (from Marc Richards) during the latter part of the 2008–09 season. Stockley admitted that at times in the season he had considered retirement, but after winning back his first-team spot he said he was enjoying his football.

He renegotiated his contract in August 2009 to gain more first-team football in the 2009–10 season; a clause that entitled Stockley to a 12-month contract extension after fifty games was removed. He started the season fighting with new signing Adam Yates for a regular place, but was transfer-listed in late September, along with the entire Port Vale squad, after manager Micky Adams saw his team slip to a third consecutive defeat. After twelve appearances in the campaign, the defender shocked Vale fans by announcing his retirement in November 2009, at the age of 32. He decided to retire on medical advice, having suffered an eye injury.

"This has undoubtedly been the most difficult decision in my career and it's not one I've taken lightly. I've had 16 years in professional football and have some fantastic memories, but it's important I put my health and my family first. My eyesight is something which has been troubling me and, unfortunately, I've had to make the decision to stop playing... I've had 16 fantastic years playing at a professional level, playing for great managers, great clubs in front of some fantastic supporters and it has been fantastic... I get caught up with it, and have always said to the lads, when I finish football I want to walk away and I want people to say, you know, he was a real good lad, a real nice lad, he worked hard, he trained hard, he played hard and he was an okay player, and that is all I ever wanted."

— Stockley reflects upon his career.

=== Later career ===
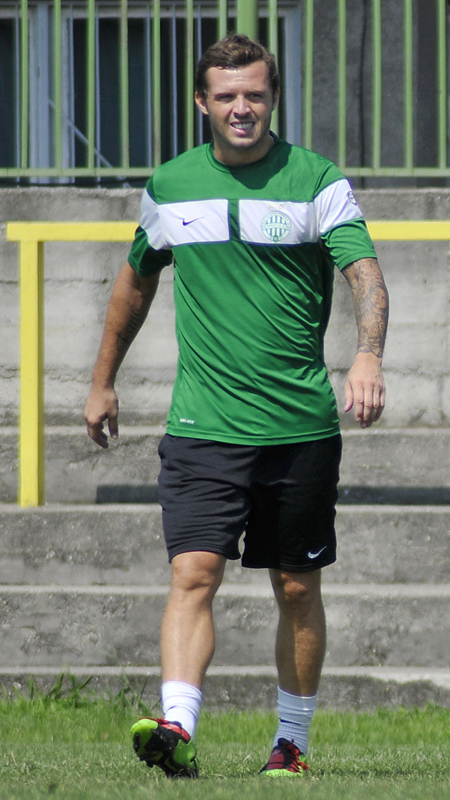
Stockley with Ferencvárosi TC in 2009

In January 2010, he came out of retirement to sign with Hungarian club Ferencvárosi TC in a coaching capacity, then managed by Craig Short. He played 15 Nemzeti Bajnokság I (top flight) games in 2009–10, also featuring four times in 2010–11 under László Prukner.

In January 2011, he joined Conference North club Telford United. However, without making a single first-team appearance for the "Bucks", Stockley signed for league rivals Droylsden the following month – to the frustration of Telford manager Andy Sinton. Later in the year he travelled to the US to sign with F.C. New York of the newly formed USL Pro (third tier). They fared poorly in 2011, not reaching the playoffs, having finished fifth in the six-team division. Professional football did not return to the Belson Stadium in 2012, as the club did not enter a league competition. In April 2012, Stockley signed for the Carolina RailHawks of the North American Soccer League for the 2012 season.

== Coaching career ==
Stockley had helped to coach the academy at Wycombe Wanderers, Port Vale and Ferencvárosi but got his first full-time coaching role as Director of Raleigh at Triangle Futbol Club from 2012 to 2014. He spent 2013 to 2017 as assistant first-team coach at Carolina RailHawks and also coached girls' football for the North Carolina FC Youth. In January 2017, he was recruited to the Xavier Musketeers coaching staff by Kacey White. Eight months later he was appointed as the new Girls' Technical Director and Associate Girls' Development Academy Director at the West Florida Flames. He later went on to scout for the United States national soccer team. He was appointed head of coaching at Cymru North club Llandudno in August 2020.

In October 2021, Stockley was announced as the Sporting Director for Lexington Sporting Club which will compete in third-division professional American soccer league USL League One in the regular 2023 season. On 13 October 2022, Lexington named Stockley first-team manager. He stepped down as manager on 17 September 2023 to focus entirely on his role as sporting director. Stockley took over as interim head coach for Lexington SC's USL Super League team in March 2025. In May 2025, he served a three-game suspension for violating the league's anti-harassment policies.

Stockley returned to England in July 2025 to take the role of academy manager at Stoke City. In June 2026, Stockley was appointed as U21 lead coach.

== Personal life ==
Stockley completed his coaching badges at 'C' level to go into management. He studied broadcast journalism at University of Staffordshire during his time at Port Vale, hoping to pursue a career in the media upon his retirement as a player, specifically as a pitch-side reporter. During his time at Wycombe Wanderers he also had his own column in the club programme. He met his wife, Anna, in 2004 and has two children: Esmé and Jobe.

"I'm doing a degree in sports journalism, that's something which really interests me, I don't mind talking a little bit and to talk about football, or any sport, just really interests me and it was an opportunity I wanted to take."

— Stockley aiming for a career in journalism, in November 2009.

== Career statistics ==
Appearances and goals by club, season and competition
Club	Season	League			National cup (Note: Includes FA Cup, U.S. Open Cup, Magyar Kupa)		League Cup		Other		Total	
Club	Season	Division	Apps	Goals	Apps	Goals	Apps	Goals	Apps	Goals	Apps	Goals
Barnet	1996–97	Third Division	21	0	0	0	0	0	1 (Note: Appearance(s) in Football League Trophy)	0	22	0
Barnet	1997–98	Third Division	41	0	1	0	4	0	3 (Note: One appearance in Football League Trophy; two appearances in Third Division play-offs)	0	49	0
Barnet	1998–99	Third Division	41	0	1	0	2	0	1	0	45	0
Barnet	1999–00	Third Division	34	1	0	0	2	0	3	0	39	1
Barnet	2000–01	Third Division	45	1	2	0	2	0	3	0	52	1
Barnet	Total		182	2	4	0	10	0	11	0	207	2
Oxford United	2001–02	Third Division	41	0	1	0	1	0	1	0	44	0
Colchester United	2002–03 (Note: Part of this season was spent on loan from Oxford United)	Second Division	33	1	1	0	0	0	1	0	35	1
Colchester United	2003–04	Second Division	44	0	6	0	2	0	6	0	58	0
Colchester United	2004–05	League One	37	1	5	0	2	0	0	0	44	1
Colchester United	2005–06	League One	27	1	3	0	1	0	4	0	35	1
Colchester United	Total		141	3	15	0	5	0	11	0	172	3
Blackpool (loan)	2005–06	League One	7	0	—		—		—		7	0
Wycombe Wanderers	2006–07	League Two	34	1	2	0	4	0	2	0	42	1
Wycombe Wanderers	2007–08	League Two	22	0	1	0	0	0	0	0	23	0
Wycombe Wanderers	Total		56	1	3	0	4	0	2	0	65	1
Port Vale	2008–09	League Two	22	0	1	0	1	0	1	0	25	0
Port Vale	2009–10	League Two	9	0	—		2	0	1	0	12	0
Port Vale	Total		31	0	1	0	3	0	2	0	37	0
Ferencvárosi TC	2009–10	Nemzeti Bajnokság I	15	0	—		1	0	—		16	0
Ferencvárosi TC	2010–11	Nemzeti Bajnokság I	2	0	1	0	1	0	—		4	0
Ferencvárosi TC	Total		17	0	1	0	2	0	0	0	20	0
Ferencvárosi TC II	2010–11	Nemzeti Bajnokság II	1	0	—		—		—		1	0
Telford United	2010–11	Conference North	0	0	—		—		0	0	0	0
Droylsden	2010–11	Conference North	1	0	—		—		—		1	0
F.C. New York	2011	USL Pro	17	0	1	0	—		—		18	0
Carolina RailHawks	2012	North American Soccer League	13	0	0	0	—		3 (Note: Appearance(s) in North American Soccer League playoffs)	0	16	0
Carolina RailHawks	2013	North American Soccer League	1	0	0	0	—		—		1	0
Carolina RailHawks	Total		14	0	0	0	—		3	0	17	0
Career total			508	6	26	0	25	0	30	0	589	6

== Honours ==
Individual

- Barnet F.C. Player of the Year: 2001

Colchester United

- League One second-place promotion: 2005–06
