= Jermaine Brown (footballer, born 1983) =

English footballer

Personal information
- Full name: Jermaine Anthony Alexander Brown
- Date of birth: 12 January 1983 (age 43)
- Place of birth: Lambeth, England
- Height: 1.80 m (5 ft 11 in)
- Position: Midfielder

Senior career*
Years	Team	Apps	(Gls)
2001–2003	Arsenal	0	(0)
2003–2004	Colchester United	0	(0)
2004	Boston United	5	(0)
2004	→ King's Lynn (loan)	0	(0)
2004–2005	Lewes		
2005	Margate	11	(2)
2005–2006	Aldershot Town	0	(0)
2011–2012	Chelmsford City	11	(0)
2013	Margate		
- * Club domestic league appearances and goals as of 14:45, 16 February 2012 (UTC)

Jermaine Anthony Alexander Brown (born 12 January 1983) is an English former professional footballer.

== Career ==
Born in Lambeth, Brown spent his career with Arsenal, before spending short spells with Colchester United and Boston United. In March 2004, Brown joined King's Lynn on loan from Boston United, but he did not feature for them and ended the deal on compassionate grounds following family illness. He "went AWOL" a few days later. He later played non-league football with Lewes, Margate and Aldershot Town. After a break from the game, he signed for Chelmsford City on 1 August 2011. He was released in January 2012, and signed for Margate again in January 2013.
