= Dewan Bader =

American soccer player-coach

Personal information
- Date of birth: April 8, 1971 (age 55)
- Place of birth: Washington, D.C., United States
- Position: Defender

Youth career
- 1989–1992: North Carolina State

Senior career*
Years	Team	Apps	(Gls)
1993–1994	Raleigh Flyers		
1994–1996	Cleveland Crunch (indoor)	60	(7)
1995	Richmond Kickers	1	(0)
1996	Wilmington Hammerheads		
1996–1999	Harrisburg Heat (indoor)	104	(21)
1999	Lehigh Valley Steam	15	(0)
1999–2000	Detroit Rockers (indoor)	44	(11)
2000	Connecticut Wolves	6	(1)
2000–2001	Buffalo Blizzard (indoor)	23	(4)
2001–2004	Baltimore Blast (indoor)	99	(11)

International career
2000	United States futsal		

Managerial career
- Johns Hopkins University (assistant)
- 2010–2018: North Carolina FC (assistant)
- 2008–2014: Carolina RailHawks U23s
- 2016–2018: North Carolina FC U23
- * Club domestic league appearances and goals

Dewan Bader (born April 8, 1971) is an American soccer coach and former player who played as a defender.

== Youth ==
Bader grew up in Rockville, Maryland, where his early high school years were spent at Woodward High School. When it closed after his sophomore season, he moved to Walter Johnson High School where he was an All State and Parade Magazine High School All American his senior season. When it came time to select a college, he decided on North Carolina State University. He played for the Wolfpack from 1989 to 1992.

== Professional ==
In 1993, Bader turned professional with the expansion Raleigh Flyers of the USISL. He spent two seasons with the Flyers, then began alternating between indoor and outdoor soccer when he signed with the Cleveland Crunch of the National Professional Soccer League in the fall of 1994. He played the 1994–1995 and 1995–1996 indoor seasons with the Crunch. In 1996, Bader and his teammates with the Crunch won the NPSL championship. In the summer of 1995, Bader moved outdoors with the Richmond Kickers where he won the double as the Kickers took the league and 1995 U.S. Open Cup titles. In the summer of 1996, he played for the expansion Wilmington Hammerheads of the USISL. In February 1995, Bader had signed a two-year contract extension with the Crunch. However, on September 20, 1996, the Crunch sent Bader to the Harrisburg Heat for a first-round draft pick and future considerations. He spent the next three indoor season with the Heat before returning to the outdoor game in 1999 with the Lehigh Valley Steam in the USL A-League. On October 8, 1999, the Harrisburg Heat traded Bader to the Detroit Rockers for future considerations. In 2000, he played the summer season with the Connecticut Wolves of the USL A-League. He then moved to the Buffalo Blizzard for the 2000–2001 season before moving to the Baltimore Blast in 2001. The Blast won the 2003 Major Indoor Soccer League championship. On July 23, 2003, the St. Louis Steamers selected Bader in the 2003 MISL Expansion Draft. A month later, the Steamers sent Bader back to the Blast as part of a three team transaction. Bader then finished his career in Baltimore, winning one more championship before retiring in 2004.

== International ==
In 2000, Bader played for the United States national futsal team.

== Post-playing career ==
Over his playing career, Bader frequently coached youth soccer as a means of supplementing the income from his playing. At some point, he was an assistant with the Johns Hopkins University soccer team. After retiring in 2004, Bader began coaching full-time with the Triangle Futbol Club. On January 25, 2008, Carolina RailHawks named Bader as the head coach of Cary RailHawks U23's. The following season, he was head coach for Cary Clarets of the Premier Development League.

Bader is currently the head coach of the Triangle Futbol Club's 1993 and 1994 Navy Men's teams and, since 2010, assistant coach for Carolina RailHawks.

On June 3, 2022, a group co-led by Bader was awarded rights to bring a USL League One club to Wilmington, North Carolina starting in 2024.
