= Nick Millington =

Guyanese footballer

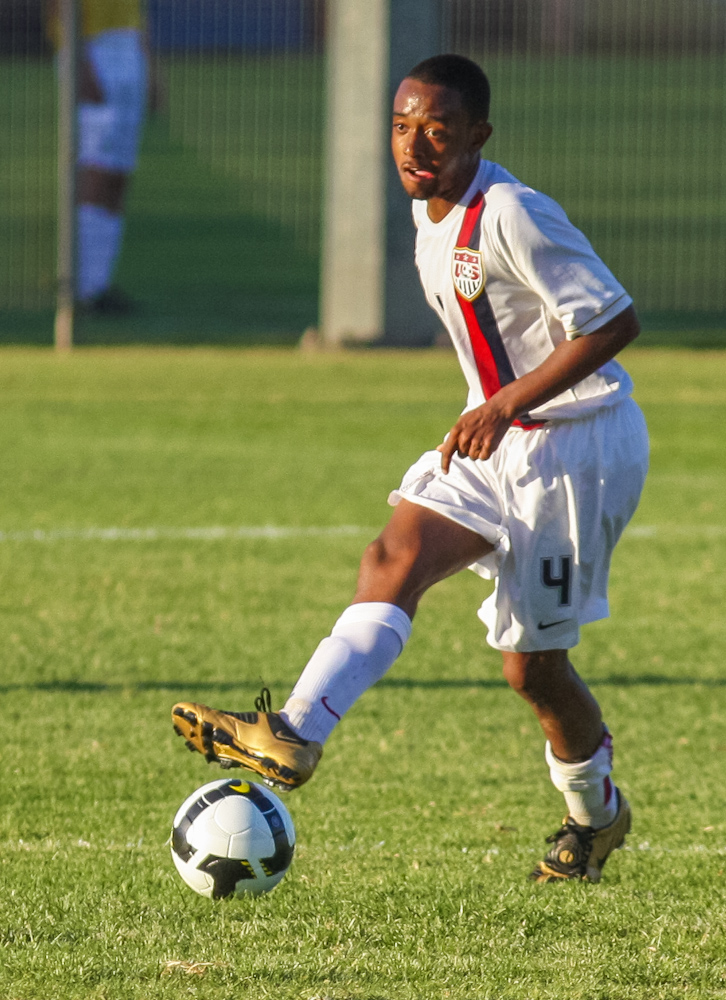
- Nick Millington with the U.S. U17 national team

Personal information
- Full name: Nicholas Stephen Millington
- Date of birth: August 9, 1991 (age 35)
- Place of birth: Hartford, Connecticut, United States
- Height: 1.75 m (5 ft 9 in)
- Positions: Defender; midfielder

Youth career
- 2005–2006: Raleigh CASL Elite
- 2006–2008: IMG Soccer Academy
- 2008–2009: Wake Forest Demon Deacons
- 2010–2011: Elon Phoenix

Senior career*
Years	Team	Apps	(Gls)
2009	Cary Clarets	6	(1)
2012–2014	Carolina RailHawks	32	(0)

International career^{‡}
2006–2007	United States U17	11	(0)
2008–2009	United States U18	11	(0)
2012	Guyana	6	(0)
- * Club domestic league appearances and goals as of December 13, 2014 ‡ National team caps and goals as of December 13, 2014

Nicholas Stephen Millington (born August 9, 1991) is a retired professional footballer. Born in the United States, he played for the Guyana national team.

== Career ==
=== Youth, college and amateur ===
After spending time with Raleigh CASL Elite and the U.S. Soccer Residency program, Millington signed to play at Wake Forest University. In this freshman year in 2008, Millington made 13 appearances including one starts and finished the year with a goal and an assist.

After making 14 appearances for Wake Forest in 2009, Millington transferred to Elon University where he saw more playing time, starting 16 of 17 matches in 2010 and scoring one goal. In 2011, he made 21 appearances and finished with a goal and two assists.

Millington also spent the 2009 season with the Cary Clarets in the USL Premier Development League.

=== Professional ===
On May 18, 2012, Millington signed his first professional contract, joining NASL club Carolina RailHawks. He made his professional debut on June 2 in a 2–1 win over the Puerto Rico Islanders.

=== International ===
Millington spent time with both the U.S. U17 and U18 national teams. On August 13, 2012, Millington was called up by the Guyanese national team for their international friendly match against Bolivia.
