= Brian Ackley =

American soccer player

Personal information
- Full name: Brian Ackley
- Date of birth: September 27, 1986 (age 40)
- Place of birth: Cary, North Carolina, United States
- Height: 1.93 m (6 ft 4 in)
- Position: Forward

College career
Years	Team	Apps	(Gls)
2005–2008	Indiana Hoosiers		

Senior career*
Years	Team	Apps	(Gls)
2006	Raleigh Elite	9	(2)
2007–2008	Cary RailHawks U23s	6	(2)
2010	Auckland City FC	5	(3)
2010	Team Wellington	8	(4)
2011	1. FK Příbram	8	(2)
2011	Reading United	5	(0)
2011	Harrisburg City Islanders	4	(0)
2012–2013	Carolina RailHawks	36	(5)
2014–2015	Wilmington Hammerheads	39	(3)
- * Club domestic league appearances and goals as of September 21, 2015

Brian Ackley (born September 27, 1986) is an American soccer player who last played for Wilmington Hammerheads.

== Career ==
Ackley signed with Carolina RailHawks in February 2012.
