= North Carolina FC U23 =

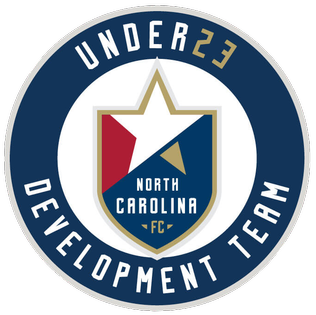
- Full name: North Carolina Football Club U23
- Founded: 2002; 24 years ago
- Stadium: WakeMed Soccer Park; Cary, North Carolina
- Capacity: 1,000
- Owner: Steve Malik
- Head Coach: Christopher Harrington
- League: USL League Two
- 2024: 3rd, South Atlantic Division; Playoffs: DNQ
- Website: northcarolinafc.com/u23
Home colors	Away colors

North Carolina Football Club U23 is an American soccer team based in Cary, North Carolina. It was founded in 2002 as the Raleigh Elite, and the current affiliate of North Carolina FC, a third division club in the United Soccer League. The team plays in USL League Two (the fourth tier of the American Soccer Pyramid), and previously in the National Premier Soccer League (NPSL).

North Carolina FC was known as the Cary Clarets in 2008 and 2009; and went dormant for a year in 2010. As a member of the USASA League, the then-Carolina RailHawks U23's took the Men's Region III Championship in 2011, 2012, and 2013 and won the U-23's National Championship in 2011 and 2013. The team's colors are navy blue, gold, and cardinal red.

== History ==
The "Raleigh CASL Elite" entered the USL League Two (then named "Premier Development League", PDL) for the first time in 2002, and was run by the Raleigh–based Capital Area Soccer League (CASL). They finished their first competitive campaign second in the Mid-Atlantic Division (behind Williamsburg Legacy) with an 11–7–0 record; and made the playoffs. They overcame Northeast Division champions Vermont Voltage 1–0 in the Conference Semi-finals before falling to the Cape Cod Crusaders in the Eastern Conference final. Raleigh enjoyed a brief foray into the US Open Cup thanks to their positive early season form, knocking out D3 Pro League side Carolina Dynamo 5–2 in the first round before losing 3–0 to A-League stalwarts Richmond Kickers in the second.

Raleigh Elite finished third in the Mid Atlantic Division in 2003, with an 8–8–2 record, 17 points behind divisional champions Richmond Kickers Future. Chris Norbet was Elite's top scorer, with seven goals; while John Izzo contributed three assists for the season. Elite finished in fourth place behind divisional champs Carolina Dynamo with a 7–9–2 record in 2004.

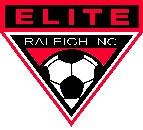
Logo of the "Raleigh Elite", introduced in 2006

In 2005 Elite enjoyed a productive season, losing just four games. The Elite were high-scoring entertainers throughout the year. They finished in third place in the Mid Atlantic Division, one point behind the Carolina Dynamo. That year, Aaron King was Raleigh's top scorer, with ten goals, while Spencer Wadsworth contributed an impressive eight assists.

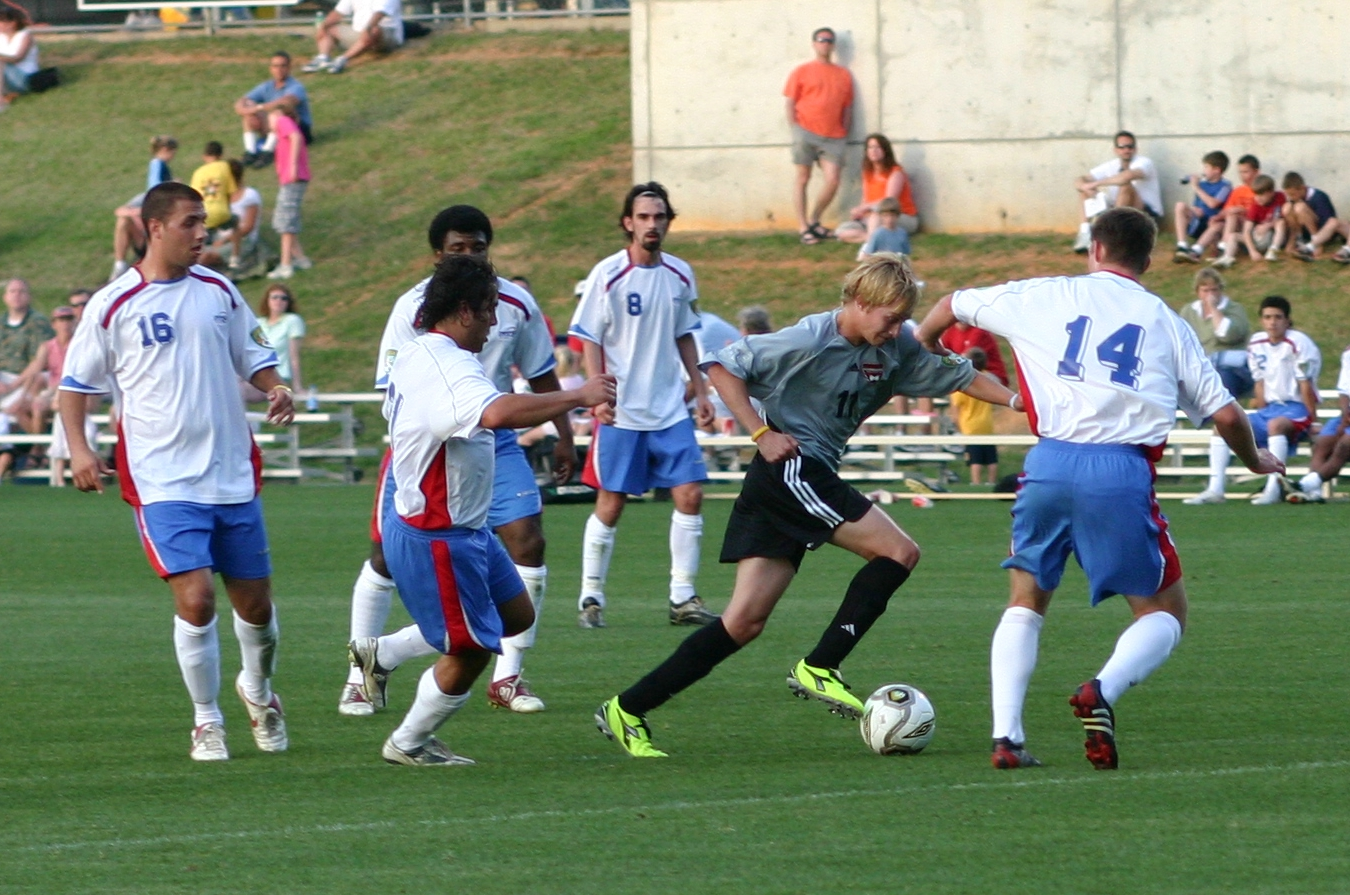
Raleigh Elite (grey and black kit) v Nashville Metros in 2006

Prior to the beginning of the 2006 season, the CASL organization severed ties with them, and the team was taken over by the Morrisville, North Carolina–based Next Level Academy, who renamed it the "Raleigh Elite". The new Elite took a step backwards in 2006, which saw them win just four games all season. Willy Guadarrama was Raleigh's top scorer, with nine goals; Guadarrama and Michael Harrington contributed four assists each.

=== Cary RailHawks U23 ===
In March 2007, the Next Level Academy formed a partnership with the then new USL First Division team, the Carolina RailHawks, who subsequently became the team's parent professional club, and the team was renamed the Cary RailHawks U23s. The RailHawks, endured yet another disappointing season not notching their first win until the fourth game of the season. Schilawski and Sassano were the RailHawks' top scorers, with four and five goals respectively, while Joe Germanese contributed four assists.

The RailHawks made a push for the playoffs in 2008. They ended the year third in the Southeast Division, just five points behind second place Bradenton Academics. Brian Shriver and Ronnie Bouemboue were Cary's top scorers, with six and five goals respectively, while Corben Bone contributed four assists.

=== Renamings ===
In November 2008, Next Level Academy announced a partnership with Burnley Football Club, then a member of the English Championship, in order to jointly develop professional players. As part of the agreement, the team was renamed the Cary Clarets in USL PD League before withdrawing at the end of the 2009 season. The team was dormant in 2010.

In 2011, the once again re-christened Carolina RailHawks U-23s made it to the USASA Men's U-23 Region III Championship and National Championship.

The Carolina RailHawks U-23's won the 2011, 2012, and 2013 USASA U-23's Region III Championship. In 2011 and 2013 the team also won the USASA U-23's National Championship. In January 2014, the team announced they would enter the NPSL for the upcoming season competing in the Mid-Atlantic Conference of the South Region.

The team was renamed to "Carolina RailHawks NPSL" on April 7, 2016. This was to allow players 23 and older to play.

== Stadium ==
- WakeMed Soccer Park; Cary, North Carolina (2003–2008, 2011–present)
- Middle Creek Park; Cary, North Carolina (2009)

== Honors ==
- USL League Two Eastern Conference (1): 2009
- USASA
  - U-23 National Champions (2): 2011, 2013
  - Region III U23 (3): 2011, 2012, 2013

== Year-by-year ==
Year	Division	League	Regular season	Playoffs	Open Cup
Raleigh CASL Elite
2002	4	USL PDL	2nd, Mid Atlantic	Conference Finals	2nd round
2003	4	USL PDL	3rd, Mid Atlantic	did not qualify	2nd round
2004	4	USL PDL	4th, Mid Atlantic	did not qualify	did not qualify
2005	4	USL PDL	3rd, Mid Atlantic	did not qualify	did not qualify
2006	4	USL PDL	4th, South Atlantic	did not qualify	did not qualify
Carolina RailHawks U23s
2007	4	USL PDL	5th, Southeast	did not qualify	did not qualify
Cary Clarets
2008	4	USL PDL	3rd, Southeast	did not qualify	did not qualify
2009	4	USL PDL	3rd, Mid Atlantic	National Semi-finals	did not qualify
2010	On Hiatus				
Carolina RailHawks U23s
2011	USASA	Region III U-23's Championship	National Championship	National Champions	did not qualify
2012	USASA	Region III U-23's Championship	National Championship		did not qualify
2013	USASA	Region III U-23's Championship	National Championship	National Champions	did not qualify
2014	4	NPSL	3rd, South Atlantic	did not qualify	did not qualify
2015	4	NPSL	3rd, South Atlantic	did not qualify	did not qualify
Carolina RailHawks NPSL
2016	4	NPSL	3rd, South Atlantic	South Atlantic Conference Semi-final	did not qualify
North Carolina FC U23
2017	4	USL PDL	7th, South Atlantic	did not qualify	did not qualify
2018	4	USL PDL	2nd, South Atlantic	did not qualify	did not qualify
2019	4	USL League Two	2nd, South Atlantic	did not qualify	did not qualify
2020	4	USL League Two	Season cancelled due to COVID-19 pandemic		
2021	4	USL League Two	6th, South Atlantic	did not qualify	did not qualify
2022	4	USL League Two	5th, South Atlantic	did not qualify	did not qualify
2023	4	USL League Two	7th, South Atlantic	did not qualify	did not qualify
2024	4	USL League Two	3th, South Atlantic	did not qualify	did not qualify
2025	4	USL League Two	3rd, South Atlantic	did not qualify	did not qualify
2026	4	USL League Two	8th, South Atlantic	did not qualify	did not qualify

== Head coaches ==
- (United States) Damon Nahas (2005–2006)
- (United States) Sean Nahas (2007)
- (United States) Dewan Bader (2008–2014)
- (France) Luis Satorra (2015)
- (United States) Dewan Bader (2016–2018)

== See also ==
- North Carolina FC
- North Carolina Courage
- North Carolina Courage U23
- North Carolina FC Youth
