= Brian Shriver =

American soccer player

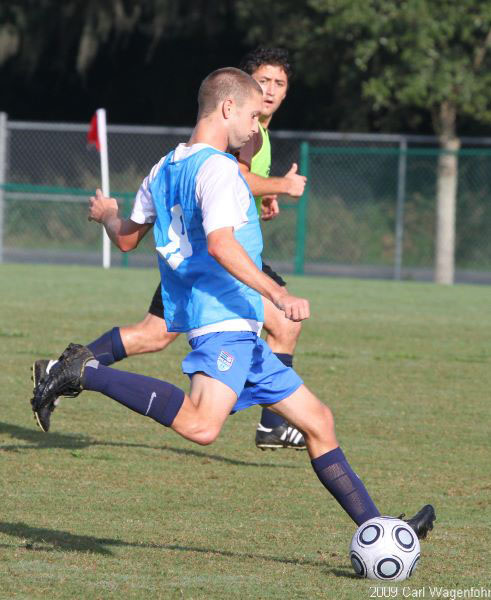

Personal information
- Full name: Brian Patrick Shriver
- Date of birth: August 5, 1987 (age 39)
- Place of birth: Clearwater, Florida, United States
- Height: 5 ft 10 in (1.78 m)
- Position: Forward

College career
Years	Team	Apps	(Gls)
2005–2008	North Carolina Tar Heels		

Senior career*
Years	Team	Apps	(Gls)
2006	Central Florida Kraze	2	(0)
2007	Carolina Dynamo	1	(0)
2007	Colorado Rapids U-23	4	(0)
2008	Cary RailHawks U23's	13	(6)
2009	Carolina Dynamo	3	(0)
2009–2011	Fort Lauderdale Strikers	49	(10)
2012–2013	Carolina RailHawks	56	(19)
2014–2015	Tampa Bay Rowdies	21	(3)
2016–2017	North Carolina FC	40	(6)
2017	Jacksonville Armada	11	(0)
2018	Richmond Kickers	32	(7)
- * Club domestic league appearances and goals as of 20:16, October 15, 2018 (UTC)

Brian Patrick Shriver (born August 5, 1987, in Clearwater, Florida) is an American former professional soccer player.

== Career ==
=== Youth and college ===
Shriver was an All-state performer at Clearwater High School, where he served as team captain for three years and earned all-county honors in 2003–04. He was named to the NSCAA/adidas Youth All-America in 2004 and participated in the 2004 adidas Elite Soccer Program.

He played college soccer at the University of North Carolina, and in the USL Premier Development League for Carolina Dynamo, Colorado Rapids U-23 and Cary RailHawks U23s, the latter of whom he scored 6 goals in 13 appearances.

=== Professional ===
Shriver was drafted in the 2009 MLS SuperDraft by FC Dallas in the second round, 27th overall. However, an injury prevented him from joining the team and he stayed at UNC to finish school and rehab. He finally joined Dallas FC at the end of the summer in 2009, but after just a month and a half of training he was not offered a contract and released by the team.

He signed with USL First Division club Miami FC in August 2009 and signed a new contract with the club, now called Fort Lauderdale Strikers and playing in the North American Soccer League, on February 8, 2011.

Shriver was traded to Carolina RailHawks on February 17, 2012, in exchange for cash and future considerations.

== Honors ==
- U.S. Open Cup Golden Boot: 2012, 2013
- NASL Golden Boot: 2013
- NASL Best XI
