= 2016 Harrisburg City Islanders season =

Harrisburg City Islanders
2016 season
- Owner: Eric Pettis
- Head coach: Bill Becher
- Stadium: FNB Field; Clipper Magazine Stadium
- USL: 10th Place
- USL Playoffs: Did not qualify
- U.S. Open Cup: Fourth round
- Top goalscorer: League: Craig Foster (8); All: Craig Foster (10)
- Highest home attendance: League: 2,853 (August 27 vs. Pittsburgh)
- Lowest home attendance: League: 839 (May 9 vs. Charleston)
- Average home league attendance: League: 1,622 All: 1,622
Home colors	Away colors

The 2016 season was the Harrisburg City Islanders's 13th season of competitive soccer - its thirteenth season in the third division of American soccer and its sixth season in the United Soccer League since the league was first created with the City Islanders as one of the original 10 founder-members.

== Stadium Relocation ==
The 2016 season marks the City Islanders transition from Skyline Sports Complex to FNB Field (formerly Metro Bank Park) on City Island in Harrisburg, Pennsylvania. The transition was a result of the collaboration with the current tenants, the Harrisburg Senators, and to keep pace with the standards being implemented by the USL. The team will also share home matches with Clipper Magazine Stadium in Lancaster, Pennsylvania as an effort to expand the Islanders fanbase throughout south central Pennsylvania.

== Roster ==
No.	Position	Nation	Player
1	GK	USA	Nick Noble
2	DF	USA	Shane Campbell
4	MF	MAR	Youssef Naciri
5	DF	USA	Shane Johnson
6	MF	USA	Bobby Warshaw
7	MF	USA	Josh Hughes
8	MF	ESP	José Barril
9	FW	USA	Garret Pettis
10	MF	JAM	Paul Wilson
11	FW	USA	Matt Bolduc
12	FW	USA	Brett Jankouskas
13	DF	USA	Darvin Ebanks
14	MF	USA	Danny DiPrima
16	DF	Isle of Man	Liam Doyle
17	DF	USA	Jamie Thomas
18	FW	USA	Aaron Wheeler
19	MF	JAM	Cardel Benbow
20	DF	USA	Chris Hill
21	MF	SEN	Mouhamed Dabo
22	FW	JAM	Craig Foster
23	DF	USA	Shawn McLaws
30	GK	BRB	Keasel Broome
37	DF	USA	Neil Shaffer (on loan from Indy Eleven)
63	DF	BER	Dante Leverock
77	FW	USA	Cameron Vickers

Updated as of July 19, 2016.

== Transfers ==
=== In ===
Date	Player	Number	Position	Previous club	Fee/notes
March 1, 2016	(United States) Aaron Wheeler	18	FW	(United States) Wilmington Hammerheads	Undisclosed
March 8, 2016	(United States) Darvin Ebanks	13	DF	(United States) Georgia Revolution	Undisclosed
March 16, 2016	(United States) Bobby Warshaw	6	DF	(Norway) Hønefoss BK	Undisclosed
March 21, 2015	(Jamaica) Craig Foster	22	FW	(Jamaica) FC Reno	Exercised Loan Option
March 23, 2016	(United States) Josh Hughes	7	MF	(United States) Atlanta Silverbacks	Undisclosed
March 23, 2016	(United States) Matt Bolduc	11	FW	(United States) Mass United	Undisclosed
March 23, 2016	(United States) Jamie Thomas	17	FW	(United States) New York Red Bulls II	Undisclosed
March 23, 2016	(United States) Chris Hill	20	DF	(United States) Villanova Wildcats	Undisclosed
March 25, 2016	(Jamaica) Paul Wilson	10	MF	(Jamaica) Portmore United FC	Undisclosed
March 25, 2016	(United States) Shane Campbell	2	DF	(United States) Reading United	Undisclosed
March 25, 2016	(United States) Shawn McLaws	23	DF	(United States) New York Red Bulls II	Undisclosed
April 2, 2016	(Barbados) Keasel Broome	30	GK	(United States) New York Cosmos	Undisclosed
April 5, 2016	(Isle of Man) Liam Doyle	16	DF	(United States) Ohio State Buckeyes	Undisclosed
April 8, 2016	(Morocco) Youssef Naciri	4	MF	(United States) Christian Brothers Buccaneers	Undisclosed
	(Senegal) Mouhamed Dabo	21	MF	(Italy) Inter Milan U-19	Undisclosed
July 29, 2016	(United States) Cameron Vickers	77	FW	(United States) Arizona United SC	Undisclosed

=== Out ===
Date	Player	Number	Position	New club	Fee/notes
November 24, 2015	(Spain) Enric Valles	11	MF	(Norway) Sandefjord	Released
December 15, 2015	(Ivory Coast) Yann Ekra	7	MF	(United States) Charlotte Independence	Undisclosed
December 23, 2015	(United States) Neil Shaffer	20	DF	(United States) Indy Eleven	Undisclosed
January 27, 2016	(United States) Ciaran Nugent	13	GK	(Republic of Ireland) Sligo Rovers F.C.	Undisclosed
January 28, 2016	(United States) Andrew Lubahn	77	FW	(United States) Louisville City FC	Undisclosed
January 29, 2016	(United States) Ken Tribbett	6	MF	(United States) Bethlehem Steel FC	Undisclosed
February 25, 2016	(United States) Jason Plumhoff	10	FW	(Canada) FC Edmonton	Undisclosed
March 3, 2016	(United States) Kyle Renfro	27	GK	(United States) Charlotte Independence	Undisclosed
March 23, 2016	(United States) Kyle McCord	4	MF	Unattached	Released
March 23, 2016	(United States) Tony Donatelli	15	MF	(United States) Baltimore Blast	Released
March 23, 2016	(Brazil) Erick Neres da Cruz	21	MF	Unattached	Released

=== Loan in ===
Date	Player	Number	Position	Loaned from	Fee/notes
May 6, 2016	(United States) Neil Shaffer	--	DF	(United States) Indy Eleven	Short-term Loan

== Competitions ==
=== Preseason ===
March 3 Preseason 1	Penn State Nittany Lions	0–0	Harrisburg City Islanders	State College, Pennsylvania
18:30		Report		Stadium: Holuba Hall

March 6 Preseason 2	UMBC Retrievers	4–0	Harrisburg City Islanders	Baltimore, Maryland
16:00		Report		Stadium: Retriever Soccer Park

March 10 Preseason 3	Lehigh Mountain Hawks	2–0	Harrisburg City Islanders	Bethlehem, Pennsylvania
19:30		Report		Stadium: Goodman Stadium

March 15 Preseason 4	Bethlehem Steel FC	1–0	Harrisburg City Islanders	Bethlehem, Pennsylvania
12:00	Brown 90'	Report		Stadium: Goodman Stadium

March 18 Preseason 5	New York Red Bulls II	2–0	Harrisburg City Islanders	Hanover, New Jersey
13:00	Allen 3', 65'	Report		Stadium: Red Bull Training Facility

March 19 Preseason 6	LUI Brooklyn Blackbirds	Cancelled	Harrisburg City Islanders	Millersville, Pennsylvania
18:00		Report		Stadium: Millersville University

2016 Harrisburg City Islanders Preseason schedule

=== USL ===
==== Standings (Eastern Conference) ====
Pos	Team	Pld	W	D	L	GF	GA	GD	Pts	Qualification
8	Orlando City B	30	9	8	13	35	49	−14	35	Conference Playoffs
9	Wilmington Hammerheads FC	30	8	10	12	37	47	−10	34	
10	Harrisburg City Islanders	30	8	7	15	37	54	−17	31	
11	Bethlehem Steel FC	30	6	10	14	32	43	−11	28	
12	Toronto FC II	30	7	5	18	36	58	−22	26	

Source: 2016 USL Standings
Rules for classification: 1) total wins; 2) total goal differential; 3) total goals scored; 4) points earned against top four Conference finishers; 5) disciplinary points; 6) coin toss or drawing of lots

==== Results ====
All times in Eastern Time.

March 26 1	Richmond Kickers	3–1	Harrisburg City Islanders	Richmond, Virginia
19:00	Callahan 16'; Yeisley 23'; Imura 48'	Report	Barril 51'	Stadium: City Stadium; Attendance: 5,355; Referee: Mark Gorak

April 2 2	Charlotte Independence	2–1	Harrisburg City Islanders	Charlotte, North Carolina
19:00	Calvert 22'; Estrada 34'	Report; Box Score	Foster 3'	Stadium: Ramblewood Soccer Complex

April 9	Pittsburgh Riverhounds	Postponed	Harrisburg City Islanders	Pittsburgh, Pennsylvania
19:00		Report		Stadium: Highmark Stadium

April 16 3	Orlando City B	0–1	Harrisburg City Islanders	Melbourne, Florida
19:30	Garcia (yellow card) 30'; Rocha (red card) 42'; Laryea (yellow card) 55'; Neal (yellow card) 82' (yellow-red card) 90'	Report; Box Score	Thomas (yellow card) 50'; Benbow 61'	Stadium: Titan Soccer Complex; Attendance: 1,019

April 22 4	Harrisburg City Islanders	2–3	Louisville City FC	Harrisburg, Pennsylvania
TBA	Wilson 45'; Jankouskas 88'	Report; Box Score	Hoffman 22' (pen.), 44'; Kaye 90+'	Stadium: FNB Field; Attendance: 2,316

April 26 5	Harrisburg City Islanders	2–1	Orlando City B	Harrisburg, Pennsylvania
19:00	Benbow (yellow card) 15'; McFadden 15' (o.g.); Barril (yellow card) 30'; Johnson 32' (yellow card) 88'; Noble (yellow card) 65'; Warshaw (red card) 80'	Report; Box Score	Heath (yellow card) 9'; Rochez 20' (pen.); Turner (yellow card) 32'; Obekop (yellow card) 67'; Garcia (yellow card) 76'	Stadium: FNB Field; Attendance: 867

April 30 6	Rochester Rhinos	2–1	Harrisburg City Islanders	Rochester, New York
18:00	Forbes 23'; James 60'	Report; Box Score	Johnson (yellow card) 36'; Foster 86'	Stadium: Sahlen's Stadium; Attendance: 2,513

May 7 7	Harrisburg City Islanders	1–1	FC Cincinnati	Harrisburg, Pennsylvania
19:00	Foster 17'; Doyle (yellow card) 83'; Hughes (yellow card) 86'; Barril (yellow card) 88'; Wheeler (yellow card)	Report; Box Score	Hoppenot (yellow card) 40'; McLaughlin 81'	Stadium: FNB Field; Attendance: 2,204

May 9 8	Harrisburg City Islanders	2–3	Charleston Battery	Harrisburg, Pennsylvania
19:00	Wilson 27', 54'; Thomas (yellow card) 42'; Warshaw (yellow card) 50'	Report; Box Score	Williams 24'; Lasso 43' (yellow card) 59'; Chang (yellow card) 45'; Prince (yellow card) 72'; Savage 80'; Cooper (yellow card) 90'	Stadium: FNB Field; Attendance: 839; Referee: Jaroslaw Werel

May 22 9	Harrisburg City Islanders	3–1	Bethlehem Steel FC	Lancaster, Pennsylvania
19:00	Wheeler 14', 15'; Barril (yellow card) 45'; Warshaw 63'	Report; Box Score	Bolduc 17'; Missimo (yellow card) 28'; Chambers (yellow card) 80'; Washington (yellow card) 87'	Stadium: Clipper Magazine Stadium; Attendance: 1,434; Referee: Margaret Domka

May 24 10	Harrisburg City Islanders	2–1	Toronto FC II	Lancaster, Pennsylvania
19:00	Wilson 26'; Wheeler 29'; Bolduc (yellow card) 86'	Report; Box Score	Osorio (yellow card) 7'; James (yellow card) 42' (goal) 90+3'	Stadium: Clipper Magazine Stadium; Attendance: 1,531

May 28 11	FC Cincinnati	2–0	Harrisburg City Islanders	Cincinnati
19:00	Wiedeman 19'; McMahon (yellow card) 78'; Okoli 89' (pen.)	Report; Box Score	Wheeler (red card) 53'; Thomas (yellow card) 82'	Stadium: Nippert Stadium; Attendance: 16,097

June 3 12	Wilmington Hammerheads FC	3–2	Harrisburg City Islanders	Wilmington, North Carolina
19:00	Fairclough 3'; Parker 14', 90'; Mecham (yellow card) 22'	Report; Box Score	Warshaw 17', 27' (yellow card) 52'; Bolduc (yellow card) 82'	Stadium: Legion Stadium; Attendance: 3,744

June 9 13	New York Red Bulls II	1–0	Harrisburg City Islanders	Harrison, New Jersey
19:00	Davis 7'; Williams (yellow card) 44'; Muyl (yellow card) 54'	Report; Box Score		Stadium: Red Bull Arena

June 18 14	Charleston Battery	1–0	Harrisburg City Islanders	Charleston, South Carolina
19:30	Woodbine (yellow card) 63'; Portillo 82' (pen.)	Report; Box Score	Thomas (yellow card) 77'	Stadium: MUSC Health Stadium; Attendance: 3,150

June 21 15	Harrisburg City Islanders	2–3	FC Montreal	Harrisburg, Pennsylvania
19:00	Wheeler 78', 82'; Benbow (yellow card) 84'; Pettis (yellow card) 90+'	Report; Box Score	Kacher 30'; Sukunda 51'; Yoseke (yellow card) 53'; Jackson-Hamel 57'; Morelli (yellow card) 88'; Riggi (yellow card) 90+'	Stadium: FNB Field; Attendance: 1,896

June 25 16	Harrisburg City Islanders	1–3	Charlotte Independence	Harrisburg, Pennsylvania
12:30	Foster 10'; Johnson (yellow card) 27'; Dabo (yellow card) 40'; Thomas (red card)	Report; Box Score	Kalungi (yellow card) 5'; Martinez 53' (pen.); Brown (yellow card) 54'; Johnson (yellow card) 75'; Hilton 86'	Stadium: FNB Field

July 4 17	Pittsburgh Riverhounds	0–0	Harrisburg City Islanders	Pittsburgh, Pennsylvania
19:00	Green (yellow card) 14'; Ewart (yellow card) 81'; Campbell (yellow card) 90+1'	Report; Box Score	Warshaw (yellow card) 45+1'; Leverock (yellow card) 52' (yellow-red card) 84'	Stadium: Highmark Stadium

July 8 18	Harrisburg City Islanders	0–3	Richmond Kickers	Lancaster, Pennsylvania
19:00		Report; Box Score	Paulini 11'; Jane 27'; Callahan 75'	Stadium: Clipper Magazine Stadium; Referee: Sawyer Gaffney

July 10 19	Harrisburg City Islanders	2–4	Toronto FC II	Lancaster, Pennsylvania
18:00	Pettis 58' (yellow card) 63'; Barril 68'	Report; Box Score	Edwards 35'; Akinola 48', 49'; Mannella (yellow card) 63'; Daniels 86'	Stadium: Clipper Magazine Stadium; Attendance: 1,503

July 17 20	Pittsburgh Riverhounds	1–2	Harrisburg City Islanders	Pittsburgh, Pennsylvania
19:00	Kerr 60' (yellow card) 63'; Branson (yellow card) 79'	Report; Box Score	Leverock 28'; Barril 32'; Benbow (yellow card) 80'	Stadium: Highmark Stadium; Attendance: 1,450

July 21 21	Bethlehem Steel FC	0–1	Harrisburg City Islanders	Bethlehem, Pennsylvania
16:00	Missimo (yellow card) 22'; Conceição (yellow card) 89'	Report; Box Score	Leverock (yellow card) 24'; Bolduc (yellow card) 29'; Jankouskas 74'; Benbow (yellow card) 79'	Stadium: Goodman Stadium; Attendance: 1,129; Referee: Elvis Mahmutovic

July 29 22	Harrisburg City Islanders	1–1	Rochester Rhinos	Harrisburg, Pennsylvania
19:00	Thomas (yellow card) 9'; Pettis (yellow card) 31'; Leverock (yellow card) 87'; Jankouskas 90+'	Report; Box Score	Totsch 87'	Stadium: FNB Field; Attendance: 1,923

August 2 23	Harrisburg City Islanders	0–5	New York Red Bulls II	Harrisburg, Pennsylvania
19:00	Hughes (yellow card) 27'; Barril (yellow card) 66'	Report; Box Score	Abang 28' (pen.) (yellow card) 45'; Metzger 64'; Deeds (yellow card) 69'; Simpara 76'; Bezecourt 78', 86'	Stadium: FNB Field; Attendance: 1,837

August 10 24	Louisville City FC	1–1	Harrisburg City Islanders	Louisville, Kentucky
19:30	Smith (yellow card) 44'; DelPiccolo 56'	Report; Box Score	Barril 20'; Thomas (yellow card) 23'; Broom (yellow card) 90'; Dabo (yellow card) 90+'	Stadium: Louisville Slugger Field; Attendance: 5,563; Referee: Georgios Zervos

August 14 25	Toronto FC II	0–1	Harrisburg City Islanders	Vaughan, Ontario
19:30	James (yellow card) 87'	Report; Box Score	Hughes (yellow card) 66'; Barril 68'	Stadium: Ontario Soccer Centre

August 27 26	Harrisburg City Islanders	1–1	Pittsburgh Riverhounds	Harrisburg, Pennsylvania
19:00	Foster 65'; Doyle (yellow card) 80'		Campbell 70'; Earls (red card); Walsh (yellow card) 85'	Stadium: FNB Field; Attendance: 2,853

August 30 27	Harrisburg City Islanders	2–2	Bethlehem Steel FC	Harrisburg, Pennsylvania
19:00	Foster 43', 81'; McLaws (yellow card) 25'; Barril (yellow card) 29'; Leverock (yellow card) 77'; Thomas (yellow card) 86'	Report; Box Score	Ayuk 45'; Chambers 48'	Stadium: FNB Field; Attendance: 1,362

September 7 28	Harrisburg City Islanders	1–4	New York Red Bulls II	Millersville, Pennsylvania
16:00	Benbow 46'	Report; Box Score	Bezecourt 23', 73' (yellow card) 43'; Powder 62', 79'; Williams (yellow card) 45'	Stadium: Millersville University

September 17 29	Harrisburg City Islanders	1–1	Wilmington Hammerheads FC	Lancaster, Pennsylvania
19:00	Thomas (yellow card) 41'; Warshaw 78'	Report; Box Score	Martz 3'; Miller (yellow card) 41'; Parratt (yellow card) 53'; Taublieb (yellow card) 59'; Lawal (yellow card) 83'	Stadium: Clipper Magazine Stadium; Attendance: 527

September 24 30	FC Montreal	1–3	Harrisburg City Islanders	Montreal, Quebec
15:00	Meilleur-Giguère 83'	Report; Box Score	Vickers 45'; Warshaw (yellow card) 68'; Foster 75'; Mkungilwa 88' (o.g.)	Stadium: Complexe sportif Claude-Robillard

2016 Harrisburg City Islanders Regular Season Schedule

==== Results summary ====
Overall								Home						Away					
Pld	Pts	W	L	T	GF	GA	GD	W	L	T	GF	GA	GD	W	L	T	GF	GA	GD
30	31	8	15	7	37	54	−17	3	8	5	23	37	−14	5	7	2	14	17	−3

Last updated: September 25, 2016
Source: 2016 USL season
Pld = Matches played; Pts = Points; W = Matches won; T = Matches tied; L = Matches lost; GF = Goals for; GA = Goals against; GD = Goal difference

Round	1	2	3	4	5	6	7	8	9	10	11	12	13	14	15	16	17	18	19	20	21	22	23	24	25	26	27	28	29	30
Stadium	A	A	A	H	H	A	H	H	H	H	A	A	A	A	H	H	A	H	H	A	A	H	H	A	A	H	H	A	H	A
Result	L	L	W	L	W	L	T	L	W	W	L	L	L	L	L	L	T	L	L	W	W	T	L	T	W	T	T	L	T	W

Updated to match(es) played on September 25, 2016. Source: 2016 USL season and Current USL Standing
A = Away; H = Home; W = Win; L = Loss; T = Tie

=== U.S. Open Cup ===
The City Islanders competed in the 2016 edition of the U.S. Open Cup. During the 2015 edition of the competition, they were eliminated in the third round after conceding three goals in extra time to the Rochester Rhinos. In 2016, the City Islanders advanced through to the fourth round, where they were ultimately defeated in stoppage time by their former MLS affiliate, Philadelphia Union. After a stoppage time equalizer was scored by Bobby Warshaw in the 91st minute, the Union drew a late free kick outside the 18 yard box. The free kick was subsequently shot into the net by Roland Alberg in the third minute of stoppage time.

May 18 Second round	(Pennsylvania) West Chester United SC	0–2	Harrisburg City Islanders (Pennsylvania)	West Chester, Pennsylvania
7:00 PM		Report	Warshaw 13'; Benbow (yellow card) 34'; Bolduc 49'; Thomas (yellow card) 62'	Stadium: West Chester United Soccer Club

June 1 Third round	(Tennessee) Chattanooga FC	1–2	Harrisburg City Islanders (Pennsylvania)	Chattanooga, Tennessee
4:30 PM	Yuhascheck 44'; Guest (yellow card) 73'; Roberts (yellow card) 74'; Hernandez (yellow card) 75'; Bywater (yellow card) 86'	Report	Warshaw (yellow card) 54'; Foster 71'; Wilson 80'	Stadium: Finley Stadium

June 15 Fourth round	(Pennsylvania) Philadelphia Union	3–2	Harrisburg City Islanders (Pennsylvania)	Chester, Pennsylvania
7:00 PM	Restrepo 3'; Marquez (yellow card) 19'; Creavalle (yellow card) 32'; Alberg 45+1', 90+3'	Report; Box Score	Foster 79'; Benbow (yellow card) 81'; Johnson (yellow card) 84'; Barril (red card) 88'; Warshaw 90+1'	Stadium: Talen Energy Stadium

== Statistics ==
As of February 4, 2017.

Players included in matchday squads
No.	Pos.	Nat.	Name	League		Playoffs		U.S. Open Cup		Total		Discipline	
No.	Pos.	Nat.	Name	Apps	Goals	Apps	Goals	Apps	Goals	Apps	Goals	A yellow rectangle, denoting the yellow penalty card shown to a player being cautioned	A red rectangle, denoting the red penalty card shown to a player being sent off
2	DF	(United States)	Shane Campbell	8	0	0	0	0	0	8	0	2	0
4	MF	(Morocco)	Youssef Naciri	2	0	0	0	0	0	2	0	0	0
5	DF	(United States)	Shane Johnson	16	1	0	0	3	0	19	1	3	0
6	MF	(United States)	Bobby Warshaw	28	4	0	0	3	2	31	6	4	1
7	MF	(United States)	Josh Hughes	22	0	0	0	1	0	23	0	3	0
8	MF	(Spain)	José Barril	29	6	0	0	3	0	32	6	7	0
9	FW	(United States)	Garret Pettis	17	1	0	0	0	0	17	1	3	0
10	MF	(Jamaica)	Paul Wilson	28	4	0	0	2	1	30	5	0	0
11	FW	(United States)	Matt Bolduc	19	0	0	0	3	1	22	1	3	0
12	FW	(United States)	Brett Jankouskas	20	3	0	0	1	0	21	3	0	0
13	DF	(United States)	Darvin Ebanks	0	0	0	0	1	0	1	0	0	0
14	MF	(United States)	Danny DiPrima	16	0	0	0	3	0	19	0	0	0
16	DF	(Isle of Man)	Liam Doyle	26	0	0	0	3	0	29	0	2	0
17	DF	(United States)	Jamie Thomas	27	0	0	0	3	0	30	0	8	2
18	FW	(United States)	Aaron Wheeler	13	5	0	0	3	0	16	5	3	1
19	MF	(Jamaica)	Cardel Benbow	25	2	0	0	3	0	28	2	6	0
20	DF	(United States)	Chris Hill	2	0	0	0	0	0	2	0	0	0
21	MF	(Senegal)	Mouhamed Dabo	21	0	0	0	0	0	21	0	2	0
22	FW	(Jamaica)	Craig Foster	25	8	0	0	3	2	28	10	0	0
23	DF	(United States)	Shawn McLaws	30	0	0	0	3	0	33	0	1	0
37	DF	(United States)	Neil Shaffer	2	0	0	0	0	0	2	0	0	0
63	DF	(Bermuda)	Dante Leverock	19	1	0	0	0	0	19	1	3	1
77	FW	(United States)	Cameron Vickers	7	1	0	0	0	0	7	1	0	0
Total											42	50	5

Numbers in parentheses denote appearances as substitute.
Players with names struck through and marked † left the club during the playing season.
Players with names in italics were loaned players.
Players with names marked * were on loan from another club for the whole of their season with Harrisburg.
League denotes USL regular season
Playoffs denotes USL playoffs

=== Goalkeepers ===
As of February 4, 2017.

Players included in matchday squads
Nat.	No.	Player	Apps	Starts	Record	GA	GAA	SO	Booked	Sent off (straight red)
(United States)	1	Nick Noble	17	17	3–11–3	32	1.88	2	2	0
(Barbados)	30	Keasel Broome	13	13	5–4–4	22	1.69	2	1	0
Total			30	30	8–15–7	54	1.80	4	3	0

Record: W-L-D

== Honors ==
- Week 4 Team of the Week: M Cardel Benbow
- Week 5 Team of the Week: Honorable Mention F Paul Wilson
- Week 10 Team of the Week: F Aaron Wheeler
- Week 17 Team of the Week: M Jose Barril
- Week 21 Team of the Week: M Jose Barril
- 2016 All-League Second Team: M (Spain) Jose Barril
