= 2016 Orlando City B season =

Orlando City B
2016 season
- Head coach: Anthony Pulis
- Stadium: Titan Soccer Complex
- USL: Conference: 8th
- USL Playoffs: Conference Quarterfinals
Home colors	Away colors

The 2016 Orlando City B season was the club's inaugural year of existence, and their first season in the Eastern Conference of the United Soccer League, the third tier of the United States soccer pyramid.

== Roster ==
As of March 11, 2016

No.	Position	Nation	Player
6	MF	CAN	Richie Laryea (GA; on loan from Orlando City)
16	DF	HON	Devron Garcia (on loan from Orlando City)
24	DF	ENG	Lewis Neal
35	FW	HON	Bryan Róchez (DP; on loan from Orlando City)
36	GK	USA	Earl Edwards, Jr. (on loan from Orlando City)
40	MF	COL	Jonathan Mendoza
41	FW	USA	Dembakwi Yomba
42	DF	CAN	Zach Ellis-Hayden
43	FW	USA	Pierre da Silva
45	DF	USA	Mikey Ambrose
46	MF	BLZ	Tony Rocha
47	MF	CMR	Marius Obekop
48	DF	IRL	Kyle Callan-McFadden
49	DF	USA	Andrew Ribeiro
50	GK	SCO	Mark Ridgers
51	FW	CAN	Michael Cox
52	FW	CMR	William Eyang
53	DF	USA	Craig Nitti
54	FW	USA	Keegan Smith
56	MF	USA	Alejandro García
57	MF	USA	Antonio Matarazzo
70	GK	USA	Jake Fenlason

== Competitions ==
=== USL Regular season ===
==== Standings ====
Pos	Team	Pld	W	D	L	GF	GA	GD	Pts	Qualification
6	Charleston Battery	30	13	9	8	38	33	+5	48	Conference Playoffs
7	Richmond Kickers	30	12	9	9	33	26	+7	45	Conference Playoffs
8	Orlando City B	30	9	8	13	35	49	−14	35	Conference Playoffs
9	Wilmington Hammerheads FC	30	8	10	12	37	47	−10	34	
10	Harrisburg City Islanders	30	8	7	15	37	54	−17	31	

Source: 2016 USL Standings
Rules for classification: 1) total wins; 2) total goal differential; 3) total goals scored; 4) points earned against top four Conference finishers; 5) disciplinary points; 6) coin toss or drawing of lots

==== Matches ====
Win Draw Loss Upcoming fixture

March 26, 2016 USL 1	Orlando City B	1–2	Wilmington Hammerheads FC	Melbourne, Florida
19:30 (EDT)	Ribeiro (yellow card) 42' (goal) 56'; McFadden (yellow card) 62'; Neal (yellow card) 90+1'	Report	Perone (yellow card) 39'; Fairclough 56'; Corbox (yellow card) 61'; Miller 65'	Stadium: Titan Soccer Complex; Attendance: 2,078

April 1, 2016 USL 2	Orlando City B	0–0	Charleston Battery	Melbourne, Florida
19:30 (EDT)	Rocha (yellow card) 6' (yellow-red card) 50'; Smith (yellow card) 76'	Report		Stadium: Titan Soccer Complex; Attendance: 1,123

April 9, 2016 USL 3	Louisville City FC	4–1	Orlando City B	Louisville, Kentucky
19:30 (EDT)	Hoffman 25'; Reynolds (yellow card) 36'; Lubahn 47'; Quinn (yellow card) 61'; Dacres 65' (yellow card) 75'; Ilić 90+1'	Report	Cox 5' (yellow card) 49'; Mendoza (yellow card) 24'; Ambrose (yellow card) 90+1'	Stadium: Louisville Slugger Field; Attendance: 5,298

April 16, 2016 USL 4	Orlando City B	0–1	Harrisburg City Islanders	Melbourne, Florida
19:30 (EDT)	Rocha (red card) 40'; Laryea (yellow card) 56'; Neal (yellow card) 82' (yellow-red card) 90'	Report	Thomas (yellow card) 51'; Benbow 60'; Wheeler (yellow card) 90'; Campbell (yellow card) 90'	Stadium: Titan Soccer Complex; Attendance: 1,019

April 22, 2016 USL 5	Pittsburgh Riverhounds	1–2	Orlando City B	Pittsburgh, Pennsylvania
19:00 (EDT)	Kerr (red card) 36'; Parkes 90+2' (pen.)	Report	Heath (yellow card) 7'; Turner 39', 67'	Stadium: Highmark Stadium; Attendance: 1,711

April 25, 2016 USL 6	Harrisburg City Islanders	2–1	Orlando City B	Harrisburg, Pennsylvania
19:00 (EDT)	Benbow (yellow card) 11'; Barril 16' (yellow card) 30'; Johnson 33'; Noble (yellow card) 65'; Warshaw (red card) 85'; Campbell (yellow card) 88'	Report	Róchez 22', pen.' Turner (yellow card) 32'; Obekop (yellow card) 68'; Mendoza (yellow card) 76'	Stadium: FNB Field; Attendance: 867

May 1, 2016 USL 7	Orlando City B	1–0	FC Montreal	Melbourne, Florida
19:30 (EDT)	Cox (yellow card) 4' (goal) 9'; García (red card) 18'	Report	Riggi (yellow card) 15'; Dominguez (yellow card) 54'; Charbonneau (yellow card) 66'	Stadium: Titan Soccer Complex; Attendance: 1,008

May 4, 2016 USL 8	Orlando City B	1–3	FC Cincinnati	Melbourne, Florida
19:30 (EDT)	Obekop (yellow card) 43'; Róchez 53' (pen.); Ridgers (red card) 76'; Ambrose (yellow card) 88'	Report	Walker 57'; Delbridge (yellow card) 72'; Okoli 78' (pen.); Stevenson (yellow card) 90+2'; Bone 90+2'	Stadium: Titan Soccer Complex; Attendance: 787

May 7, 2016 USL 9	Orlando City B	2–2	Bethlehem Steel FC	Melbourne, Florida
19:30 (EDT)	Rocha 12' (o.g.); Turner 17'; Donovan (yellow card) 35'; Cox 54'; Boden (yellow card) 65'	Report	Herbers 14'; Daly (yellow card) 33'; Restrepo (red card) 50'; Chambers (yellow card) 87'; Missimo (yellow card) 90+3'	Stadium: Titan Soccer Complex; Attendance: 928

May 22, 2016 USL 10	Orlando City B	2–1	Rochester Rhinos	Melbourne, Florida
19:30 (EDT)	Barry 41', 57'; Turner (yellow card) 90'	Report	Garzi (yellow card) 42'; Apostolopoulos (yellow card) 74'; Dos Santos 86' (pen.)	Stadium: Titan Soccer Complex; Attendance: 925

May 28, 2016 USL 11	Orlando City B	2–1	Charlotte Independence	Melbourne, Florida
19:30 (EDT)	Turner (yellow card) 18' da Silva 53', 71'	Report	Alajarín (yellow card) 16'; Slogic (yellow card) 20'; Brown 33'; Kalungi (yellow card) 70'	Stadium: Titan Soccer Complex

June 5, 2016 USL 12	Orlando City B	3–4	Louisville City FC	Melbourne, Florida
19:30 (EDT)	Heath 29'; Turner (yellow card) 37'; Barry 51'; Laryea (yellow card) 60'; Cox 90+1'	Report	Hoffman 12'; Davis (yellow card) 15' (yellow-red card) 39'; Newman 60'; Lubahn 64'; Quinn 68'; Smith (yellow card) 80'	Stadium: Titan Soccer Complex; Attendance: 781

June 11, 2016 USL 13	Charleston Battery	1–2	Orlando City B	Charleston, South Carolina
19:30 (EDT)	Chang (yellow card) 12'; Prince (yellow card) 20'; Lasso (yellow card) 42'; Portillo 45' (pen.)	Report	Cox 15'; Donovan 42'; Turner (yellow card) 45' (yellow-red card) 45'	Stadium: MUSC Health Stadium

June 19, 2016 USL 14	Orlando City B	2–2	New York Red Bulls II	Melbourne, Florida
19:30 (EDT)	García 17'; Ambrose (yellow card) 47' da Silva 87'	Report	Williams (yellow card) 28'; Schmoll 38'; Long 41'; Plewa (yellow card) 69'; Metzger (yellow card) 80'	Stadium: Titan Soccer Complex; Attendance: 1,009

June 26, 2016 USL 15	FC Montreal	1–3	Orlando City B	Montreal, Quebec
15:00 (EDT)	Sukunda (yellow card) 11'; Béland-Goyette (yellow card) 27' (yellow-red card) 85'; Riggi 35' (pen.); Fisher (yellow card) 55'	Report	Laryea (yellow card) 17'; Barry 31'; Mkungilwa 42' (o.g.); Neal (red card); Ridgers (yellow card) 90'; Mendoza 90+4'	Stadium: Complexe sportif Claude-Robillard

July 2, 2016 USL 16	Orlando City B	1–1	Charlotte Independence	Melbourne, Florida
19:30 (EDT)	Ambrose (yellow card) 40'; Cox 47'; Rocha (yellow card) 67'	Report	Brown 24'; Martínez (yellow card) 51'; Hilton (yellow card) 54'; Clowes (yellow card) 72'	Stadium: Titan Soccer Complex; Attendance: 731

July 10, 2016 USL 17	Rochester Rhinos	0–0	Orlando City B	Rochester, New York
18:00 (EDT)	Fall (yellow card) 31'	Report	Mendoza (yellow card) 24'	Stadium: Rochester Rhinos Stadium

July 13, 2016 USL 18	Charleston Battery	0–0	Orlando City B	Charleston, South Carolina
19:30 (EDT)	Portillo (yellow card) 42'; Garbanzo (yellow card) 89'	Report	Ellis-Hayden (yellow card) 5' da Silva (yellow card) 81'	Stadium: MUSC Health Stadium; Attendance: 3,153

July 24, 2016 USL 19	Orlando City B	2–2	Wilmington Hammerheads FC	Melbourne, Florida
19:30 (EDT)	Cox 27' (pen.); Rocha 82'; Laryea (yellow card) 89'	Report	Miller (yellow card) 26' (goal) 90'; Fairclough 48' (yellow card) 72'; Perone (red card) 55'	Stadium: Titan Soccer Complex

July 30, 2016 USL 20	Louisville City FC	1–2	Orlando City B	Louisville, Kentucky
19:30 (EDT)	Abend 13'; Reynolds (yellow card) 43'; Davis (yellow card) 72'	Report	Cox (yellow card) 70'; Turner pen.' Smith 90' (yellow card) 90'	Stadium: Louisville Slugger Field; Attendance: 8,351

August 6, 2016 USL 21	Orlando City B	2–1	Toronto FC II	Melbourne, Florida
19:30 (EDT)	Redding (yellow card) 24'; Neal 58'; McFadden (yellow card) 68'; Cox 90+2'	Report	Osorio (yellow card) 48'; Edwards (yellow card) 54'; Taintor 90+1'	Stadium: Titan Soccer Complex; Attendance: 745; Referee: Jonathan Weiner

August 12, 2016 USL 22	New York Red Bulls II	5–1	Orlando City B	Harrison, New Jersey
19:00 (EDT)				Stadium: Red Bull Arena

August 17, 2016 USL 23	Charlotte Independence	4–0	Orlando City B	Charlotte, North Carolina
19:00 (EDT)				Stadium: Ramblewood Soccer Complex

August 21, 2016 USL 24	Orlando City B	1–1	Richmond Kickers	Melbourne, Florida
19:30 (EDT)				Stadium: Titan Soccer Complex

August 27, 2016 USL 25	Richmond Kickers	1–0	Orlando City B	Richmond, Virginia
19:00 (EDT)				Stadium: City Stadium

September 3, 2016 USL 26	Orlando City B	0–2	Pittsburgh Riverhounds	Melbourne, Florida
19:30 (EDT)				Stadium: Titan Soccer Complex

September 7, 2016 USL 27	Wilmington Hammerheads FC	3–0	Orlando City B	Wilmington, North Carolina
19:00 (EDT)				Stadium: Legion Stadium

September 11, 2016 USL 28	Toronto FC II	2–1	Orlando City B	Vaughan, Ontario
19:30 (EDT)				Stadium: Ontario Soccer Centre

September 17, 2016 USL 29	FC Cincinnati	1–0	Orlando City B	Cincinnati, Ohio
19:00 (EDT)	Stevenson (yellow card) 48'; Delbridge (yellow card) 51'; McMahon (yellow card) 61'; Townsend 81'; Townsend (yellow card) 90'	USL Report; OCB Report		Stadium: Nippert Stadium; Attendance: 24,376

September 25, 2016 USL 30	Bethlehem Steel FC	0–2	Orlando City B	Bethlehem, Pennsylvania
15:00 (EDT)				Stadium: Goodman Stadium

October 2, 2016 PLAYOFF	New York Red Bulls II	4–0	Orlando City B	Harrison, New Jersey
19:00 (EDT)				Stadium: Red Bull Arena
