= List of Sigma Tau chapters =

Sigma Tau was an engineering honor society. In 1974, it merged with Tau Beta Pi, the oldest engineering honor society and the second oldest collegiate honor society in the United States. As part of the merger, Tau Beta Pi absorbed twelve Sigma Tau chapters into its existing chapters located on the same campuses. Tau Beta Pi re-chartered 22 Sigma Tau chapters at campuses where it did not exist.

In the following chapter list, inactive chapters and institutions are indicated in italics.

Chapter	Charter date and range	Institution	Location	Status	Ref.
Alpha	February 22, 1904 – January 1, 1974	University of Nebraska–Lincoln	Lincoln, Nebraska	Merged (ΤΒΠ)	(Note: Became the Nebraska Alpha chapter of Tau Beta Pi.)
Beta	November 16, 1907 – March 26, 1912	University of Iowa	Iowa City, Iowa	Inactive	
Gamma	February 22, 1911 – January 1, 1974	University of Pennsylvania	Philadelphia, Pennsylvania	Merged (ΤΒΠ)	(Note: Merged in the Pennsylvania Delta chapter of Tau Beta Pi.)
Delta (First)	April 12, 1912 – April 22, 1916	University of South Dakota	Vermillion, South Dakota	Inactive, Reissued	
Delta (Second)	May 17, 1941 – January 1, 1974	South Dakota State University	Brookings, South Dakota	Merged (ΤΒΠ )	(Note: Became the South Dakota Beta chapter of Tau Beta Pi.)
Epsilon	May 16, 1912 – January 1, 1974	Kansas State University	Manhattan, Kansas	Merged (ΤΒΠ)	(Note: Merged in the Kansas Gamma chapter of Tau Beta Pi.)
Zeta	April 23, 1913 – January 1, 1974	Oregon State University	Corvallis, Oregon	Merged (ΤΒΠ)	(Note: Merged in the Oregon Alpha chapter of Tau Beta Pi.)
Eta	May 16, 1913 – January 1, 1974	Washington State University	Pullman, Washington	Merged (ΤΒΠ)	(Note: Merged in the Washington Beta chapter of Tau Beta Pi.)
Theta	February 27, 1914 – before 1974	University of Illinois Urbana-Champaign	Urbana, Illinois	Inactive	
Iota	June 1, 1914 – January 1, 1974	University of Colorado Boulder	Boulder, Colorado	Merged (ΤΒΠ)	(Note: Merged in the Colorado Beta chapter of Tau Beta Pi.)
Kappa	May 1, 1915 – January 1, 1974	Pennsylvania State University	State College, Pennsylvania	Merged (ΤΒΠ)	(Note: Merged in the Pennsylvania Beta chapter of Tau Beta Pi.)
Lambda	May 22, 1915 – January 1, 1974	University of Kansas	Lawrence, Kansas	Merged (ΤΒΠ)	(Note: Merged in the Kansas Alpha chapter of Tau Beta Pi.)
Mu	May 13, 1916 – January 1, 1974	University of Oklahoma	Norman, Oklahoma	Merged (ΤΒΠ)	(Note: Merged in the Oklahoma Alpha chapter of Tau Beta Pi.)
Nu	October 20, 1916 – January 1, 1974	Swarthmore College	Swarthmore, Pennsylvania	Merged (ΤΒΠ)	(Note: Became the Pennsylvania Kappa chapter of Tau Beta Pi.)
Xi	April 8, 1921 – January 1, 1974	George Washington University	Washington, D.C.	Merged (ΤΒΠ)	(Note: Merged in the District of Columbia Gamma chapter of Tau Beta Pi.)
Omicron	December 21, 1935 – January 1, 1974	University of Louisville	Louisville, Kentucky	Merged (ΤΒΠ)	(Note: Became the Kentucky Beta chapter of Tau Beta Pi.)
Pi	April 8, 1922 – January 1, 1974	University of North Dakota	Grand Forks, North Dakota	Merged (ΤΒΠ)	(Note: Became the North Dakota Beta chapter of Tau Beta Pi.)
Rho	May 22, 1922 – January 1, 1974	University of Idaho	Moscow, Idaho	Merged (ΤΒΠ)	(Note: Became the Idaho Alpha chapter of Tau Beta Pi.)
Sigma	April 16, 1923 – January 1, 1974	Oklahoma State University	Stillwater, Oklahoma	Merged (ΤΒΠ)	(Note: Became the Oklahoma Gamma chapter of Tau Beta Pi.)
Tau	April 26, 1923 – January 1, 1974	South Dakota School of Mines and Technology	Rapid City, South Dakota	Merged (ΤΒΠ)	(Note: Became the South Dakota Alpha chapter of Tau Beta Pi.)
Upsilon	December 3, 1923 – January 1, 1974	University of Florida	Gainesville, FL	Merged (ΤΒΠ)	(Note: Merged in the Florida Alpha chapter of Tau Beta Pi.)
Phi	December 13, 1924 – January 1, 1974	University of Akron	Akron, OH	Merged (ΤΒΠ)	(Note: Became the Ohio Kappa chapter of Tau Beta Pi.)
Chi	December 22, 1928 – January 1, 1974	University of New Mexico	Albuquerque, NM	Merged (ΤΒΠ)	(Note: Became the New Mexico Beta chapter of Tau Beta Pi.)
Psi	May 31, 1930 – January 1, 1974	University of Pittsburgh	Pittsburgh, PA	Merged (ΤΒΠ)	(Note: Became the Pennsylvania Lambda chapter of Tau Beta Pi.)
Omega	January 13, 1932 – January 1, 1974	University of Wyoming	Laramie, WY	Merged (ΤΒΠ)	(Note: Became the Wyoming Alpha chapter of Tau Beta Pi.)
Alpha Alpha	May 14, 1936 – January 1, 1974	Colorado State University	Fort Collins, CO	Merged (ΤΒΠ)	(Note: Became the Colorado Delta chapter of Tau Beta Pi.)
Alpha Beta	October 17, 1942 – January 1, 1974	Southern Methodist University	Dallas, TX	Merged (ΤΒΠ)	(Note: Became the Texas Iota chapter of Tau Beta Pi.)
Alpha Gamma	May 22, 1949 – January 1, 1974	New Mexico State University	Las Cruces, NM	Merged (ΤΒΠ)	(Note: Became the New Mexico Alpha chapter of Tau Beta Pi.)
Alpha Delta	February 10, 1951 – January 1, 1974	Utah State University	Logan, UT	Merged (ΤΒΠ)	(Note: Became the Utah Gamma chapter of Tau Beta Pi.)
Alpha Epsilon	May 22, 1952 – January 1, 1974	University of Nevada, Reno	Reno, NV	Merged (ΤΒΠ)	(Note: Became the Nevada Alpha chapter of Tau Beta Pi.)
Alpha Zeta	May 20, 1953 – January 1, 1974	Rice University	Houston, TX	Merged (ΤΒΠ)	(Note: Merged in the Texas Gamma chapter of Tau Beta Pi.)
Alpha Eta	April 22, 1956 – January 1, 1974	Texas A&I University	Kingsville, TX	Merged (ΤΒΠ)	(Note: Became the Texas Lambda chapter of Tau Beta Pi.)
Alpha Theta	April 23, 1956 – January 1, 1974	Youngstown State University	Youngstown, OH	Merged (ΤΒΠ)	(Note: Became the Ohio Lambda chapter of Tau Beta Pi.)
Alpha Iota	February 1, 1958 – January 1, 1974	Bradley University	Peoria, IL	Merged (ΤΒΠ)	(Note: Merged in the Illinois Delta chapter of Tau Beta Pi.)
Alpha Kappa	April 19, 1966 – January 1, 1974	Fresno State University	Fresno, CA	Merged (ΤΒΠ)	(Note: Became the California Rho chapter of Tau Beta Pi.)
Alpha Lambda	December 10, 1971 – January 1, 1974	Prairie View A&M University	Prairie View, TX	Merged (ΤΒΠ)	(Note: Became the Texas Epsilon chapter of Tau Beta Pi.)
Alpha Mu	November 17, 1973 – January 1, 1974	Christian Brothers College	Memphis, TN	Merged (ΤΒΠ)	(Note: Became the Tennessee Delta chapter of Tau Beta Pi.)
Omega Alpha	November 12, 1954 – January 1, 1974	General Chapter	n/a	Inactive	
