= Canale Arena =

On-campus athletic facility

- Interactive map of Canale Arena
- Former names: De La Salle Gymnasium
- Location: 650 East Parkway South; Memphis, Tennessee 38104
- Coordinates: 35.12674°N 89.983°W
- Owner: Christian Brothers University
- Capacity: 1,000
- Public transit: MATA

Construction
- Opened: 1950
- Renovated: December 10, 2004
- Architect: Askew Nixon Ferguson Architects

Tenant
- Christian Brothers University Buccaneers

Canale Arena (formerly De La Salle Gymnasium) is the on-campus athletic facility for Christian Brothers University in Memphis, Tennessee.

== Buccaneers ==
Canale Arena is home to the Buccaneer and Lady Buccaneer basketball and volleyball teams.

The Buccaneer basketball team was the Gulf South Conference champion in 2008.

== History ==
=== Origin ===
The original structure was completed in 1950. At that time, it was the largest indoor arena in the city of Memphis.

=== Renovation ===
The arena was fully renovated in 2004. Among renovations were the addition of new stadium seating, bleachers, a hospitality suite, a Hall of Fame conference room, restrooms, a lobby, and Canale Cafe. The arena has a stated capacity of 1,000.

=== Namesake ===
The athletic facility was originally named De La Salle Gymnasium in honor of St. John Baptist de la Salle, the founder of the Christian Brothers. The Lasallian Christian Brothers, a Roman Catholic religious institute, founded Christian Brothers University in 1871.

When the facility was reopened and blessed on December 10, 2004, it was renamed in honor of John D. Canale Jr. Memphis businessman John D. Canale Jr. served on the university's board of trustees from 1970 to 1983 and received the university's prestigious Maurelian Medal in 1994 for his support of and service to the university. Canale's history of contribution to the university includes raising funds in 1949 to build De La Salle Gymnasium. Additionally, Canale donated the funding to build the John Canale Pool on campus in 1986. The pool was named in honor of Canale's father, John D. Canale Sr., a lifelong supporter of the Christian Brothers and valedictorian of the Christian Brothers College class of 1891.
