= Shane Campbell (disambiguation) =

Shane Campbell is an MMA fighter.

Shane Campbell may also refer to:

- Shane Campbell (soccer), American soccer player
- Shayne Campbell, Canadian soccer player
- Shane Campbell (ice hockey), in 2001 ECAC Hockey Men's Ice Hockey Tournament
