= Craig Foster (Jamaican footballer) =

Jamaican footballer (born 1991)

Personal information
- Full name: Craig Jeffrey Foster
- Date of birth: 7 September 1991 (age 35)
- Place of birth: Jamaica
- Height: 1.79 m (5 ft 10 1/2 in)
- Position: Forward

Senior career*
Years	Team	Apps	(Gls)
2010–2015	FC Reno	?	(36)
2011	→ Motala AIF (loan)	6	(3)
2012	→ Motala AIF (loan)	17	(8)
2013	→ IFK Mariehamn (loan)	1	(0)
2013	→ KooTeePee (loan)	5	(2)
2015	→ Harrisburg City Islanders (loan)	13	(9)
2016	Harrisburg City Islanders	25	(8)
2017–2018	FC Reno	32	(16)
2018	Humble Lions F.C.	26	(10)
2019	USAC	14	(7)
2019	AD Chalatenango	18	(10)
2020	A.D. Municipal Pérez Zeledón	8	(2)
2021	Chalatenango	16	(6)
2021	Once Deportivo	23	(6)
2022	Santa Tecla	12	(1)

International career^{‡}
2010–2011	Jamaica U20	5	(8)
- * Club domestic league appearances and goals as of 13 October 2022 ‡ National team caps and goals as of 30 January 2011

Craig Foster (born 7 September 1991) is a Jamaican international footballer, who plays as a striker, most recently for Santa Tecla.

== Youth career ==
Foster played in the Dacosta Cup for the Manning's School in Jamaica.

== Club career ==
In 2010, Foster became a regular for Reno F.C. in the DPL. As January 2011, he is one of the top 5 goalscorers in the 2010/2011 DPL season. Foster finished the 2010/2011 DPL with 15 goals in his first season in the top flight. Foster was named league MVP while finishing 2nd in the race for the Golden Boot. Foster signed with Motala AIF during the summer of 2011. Foster returned to Reno at the end of the 2012 RSPL Season. He then returned to Motala AIF for the 2012 Swedish season. Foster played for IFK Mariehamn in 2013. In 2014, Foster once again featured for Reno F.C. and lead them to the 2014 title.

=== Harrisburg City Islanders ===
In July 2015, Foster was loaned to USL side Harrisburg City Islanders for the remainder of the 2015 season. Foster scored in his debut for the Islanders against New York Red Bulls II on 12 July 2015. Ahead of the 2016 season, Foster's loan option was exercised bringing him permanently on the Islanders roster.

In January 2017, Foster rejoined FC Reno.

In January 2018, Foster transferred to Humble Lions F.C. in the RSPL. He scored 2 goals in his first three games at his new club.

=== Universidad SC ===
Craig Foster began his Central America career in Guatemala, joining Universidad SC in January 2019.

=== AD Chalatenango ===
He transferred to AD Chalatenango in July 2019, going on to score 10 goals in 18 matches during the Apertura 2019.

=== A.D. Municipal Pérez Zeledón ===
Craig Foster joined A.D. Municipal Pérez Zeledón in January 2020.

=== AD Chalatenango ===
He returned to Chalatenango in January 2021.

== International career ==
In 2010, he led Jamaica U20 national team to the 2011 CONCACAF Finals scoring eight goals during qualifying.

== Style of play ==
Fosteris a forward, who is noted for his physical speed and stamina. His playing style includes the ability to shoot accurately with both his left and right feet. Regarded as a prolific goalscorer with good technique, composure in front of goal, and an ability to play off other forwards, Foster is primarily deployed as a central striker.

== Honours ==
Reno

- Western Confederation Super League: 2010, 2014

Individual

- Jamaica National Premier League MVP: 2010–2011
