= Josh Hughes =

American professional soccer player (born 1991)

Personal information
- Full name: Joshua Hughes
- Date of birth: November 3, 1991 (age 34)
- Place of birth: Fort Worth, Texas, United States
- Height: 5 ft 10 in (1.78 m)
- Position: Midfielder

Team information
- Current team: Baltimore Blast

Youth career
- 2003–2010: AFC Lightning

College career
Years	Team	Apps	(Gls)
2010–2013	Berry Vikings	70	(19)

Senior career*
Years	Team	Apps	(Gls)
2012–2014	Forest City London	40	(2)
2015	Atlanta Silverbacks	14	(0)
2016	Harrisburg City Islanders	22	(0)
2016–2017	Baltimore Blast (indoor)	8	(2)
2018	Nashville SC	0	(0)
2018–2024?	Baltimore Blast (indoor)	9	(6)
2019	Richmond Kickers	22	(2)
- * Club domestic league appearances and goals as of October 21, 2019

Joshua Hughes (born November 3, 1991) is a former American professional soccer player who last played as a midfielder for the Richmond Kickers.

== Career ==
=== College and amateur ===
Hughes spent his entire college career at Berry College. He made a total of 69 appearances for the Vikings and tallied 14 goals and six assists.

He also played in the Premier Development League for Forest City London.

=== Professional ===
On April 15, 2015, Hughes signed a professional contract with NASL side Atlanta Silverbacks. He made his professional debut on July 4, 2015, in a 2–1 defeat to the Tampa Bay Rowdies.

On March 23, 2016, Hughes joined USL club Harrisburg City Islanders where he became a regular starter for the 2016 season

Hughes spent time with MASL side Baltimore Blast in 2017, before joining USL side Nashville SC for their inaugural season. Hughes made the Nashville bench several times in 2018, but only saw action during two U.S. Open Cup matches against lower division opponents Inter Nashville FC and Mississippi Brilla.

Hughes rejoined the Blast ahead of the 2018–19 Major Arena Soccer League season.

Hughes signed with USL League One side Richmond Kickers on January 2, 2019.
