= Gulf South Conference =

Collegiate athletic conference

- Association: NCAA
- Founded: 1970
- Commissioner: Matt Wilson (since 2014)
- Sports fielded: 17; men's: 8; women's: 9
- Division: Division II
- No. of teams: 11
- Headquarters: Birmingham, Alabama
- Region: Southeastern United States
- Website: www.gscsports.org

Locations

The Gulf South Conference (GSC) is a college athletic conference affiliated with the National Collegiate Athletic Association (NCAA) at the Division II level, which operates in the Southeastern United States.

== History ==
Gulf South Conference
Location of GSC members:
current
departing
future

Originally known as the Mid-South Athletic Conference or Mid-South Conference, the Gulf South Conference was formed by six universities in the summer of 1970: Delta State, Florence State (now North Alabama), Jacksonville State, Livingston (now West Alabama), Tennessee–Martin, and Troy State (now Troy). Scheduling problems for the 1970–71 academic year limited the league to football, won by Jacksonville State.

In 1971, the league changed its name to the Gulf South Conference; added Southeastern Louisiana (SLU) and Nicholls State (increasing the membership to eight); opened an office in Hammond, Louisiana; and began championships in all men's sports. The following year, Mississippi College (now Mississippi Christian University) and Northwestern Louisiana (NWLA, now Northwestern State) were admitted. NWLA withdrew to go Division I two years later, followed by SLU and Nicholls State in 1979.

The conference continued with seven teams until 1981, when the presidents admitted Valdosta State. West Georgia joined in 1983. Eight years of stability ended in 1991 when Tennessee–Martin and Troy State went Division I, briefly dropping the GSC back to seven members, before the beginning of an expansion resulting in ten new members: Lincoln Memorial (1992–93); Alabama–Huntsville, Henderson State, Central Arkansas, and Mississippi University for Women (MUW) (1993–94); West Florida (1994–95); and Arkansas-Monticello, Arkansas Tech, Montevallo, and Southern Arkansas (1995–96). Jacksonville State went Division I at the end of 1992–93. Mississippi College dropped to Division III at the end of 1995–96 and was replaced by Christian Brothers to keep the Conference at 16 schools. In July 2000, the GSC welcomed Harding University and Ouachita Baptist University, making it the largest NCAA conference at any level with 18 schools. The Conference membership decreased to 17 when MUW dropped its athletics program at the end of the 2002–03 season.

2006–07 was another season of change for the GSC. Central Arkansas moved to Division I, leaving the West Division with eight schools while Lincoln Memorial left for the South Atlantic Conference due to travel and location issues, leaving the East Division with seven schools.

Montevallo announced on June 27, 2008 that they would be leaving for the Peach Belt Conference following the 2008–09 season due to issues between the University's President and the Commissioner.

The GSC moved away from divisional play after the 2010-11 season after its six Arkansas members broke away, dropping the membership to eight. Thanks to an aggressive expansion plan, the GSC sponsored the Division II applications of Union University (TN) and Shorter University (GA), which became official members in 2014-15. The next step in bolstering its membership came in 2012, backing the Division II application of Lee University (TN) which was on track to join the league officially in 2015-16. The league added its first-ever associate member, Florida Tech, in football only in 2013. The Conference planned to add an old friend back into the fold when Mississippi College submitted its application to rejoin Division II and was on track for 2016-17 membership.

Former Commissioner Jim McCullough brought the GSC office to Birmingham when he was hired in 1979. The conference welcomed its seventh commissioner in May 2014 when Matt Wilson was selected to follow Nate Salant who retired after a 22-year stint.

=== 2010s realignment ===
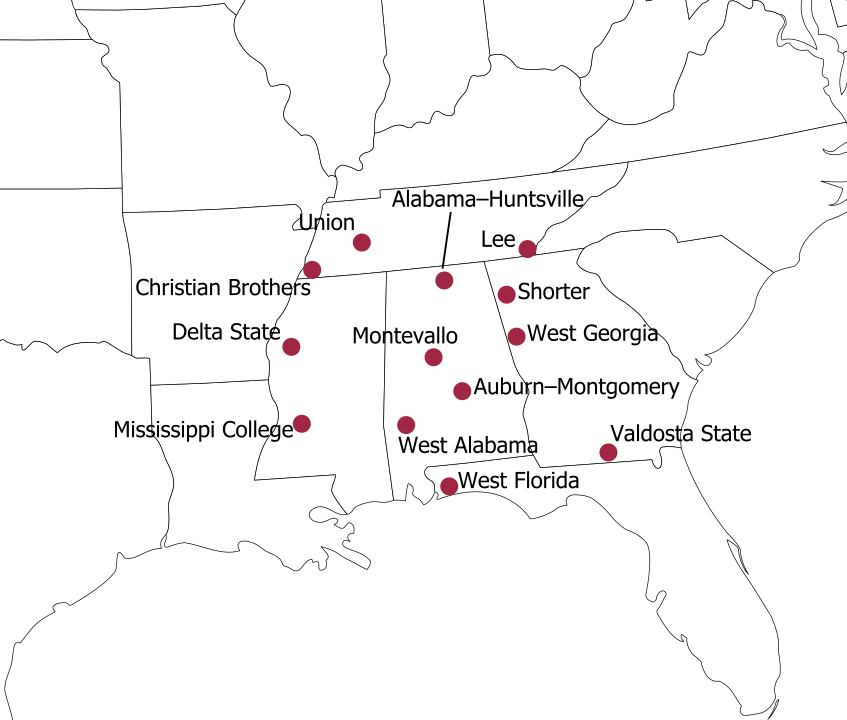
Map of GSC school locations (pre-2024)

Beginning with the 2011–12 academic year; Arkansas Tech University, University of Arkansas at Monticello, Harding University, Henderson State University, Ouachita Baptist University, and Southern Arkansas University left the GSC to form the Great American Conference.

The University of New Orleans, which was transitioning from Division I to Division II, was accepted into the conference in June 2011, but the school announced intentions to stay at Division I in March 2012. In July 2011, Shorter University and Union University (Jackson, Tenn.) were accepted into the NCAA and began the multi-year transition process from the NAIA to NCAA. Both universities began GSC competition in the 2012–13 academic year but will not be eligible for NCAA national tournaments until the 2014–15 academic year. In August 2011, the GSC added the Florida Institute of Technology as an associate member for football beginning in the 2013 season.

On October 11, 2012, Mississippi College announced that it would petition the NCAA to leave Division III and return to the conference. The transition was a lengthy process; Mississippi College officially became a Division II candidate starting with the 2013–14 academic year, with the school becoming a full Division II member for 2016–17.

In 2013, Lee University joined the GSC, bringing the membership to 11. Lee University moved to Division II provisional membership for the 2014-15 season. They will complete transition to Division II in the 2015-16 season. Mississippi College entered its second candidacy year with the 2014-15 season in its path to full Division II membership in 2016-17 and added Gulf South Conference teams to its schedule.

The next change to the conference's membership was officially announced on December 6, 2016 when North Alabama was accepted to the ASUN Conference and would begin a transition to Division I sports in 2018. In May 2020, affiliate member Florida Tech announced the discontinuation of their football program due to the financial fallout of the COVID-19 pandemic.

=== Chronological timeline ===
- 1970 – The Gulf South Conference (GSC) was founded as a football-only league known as the Mid-South Athletic Conference (MSAC). Charter members included Delta State College (now Delta State University), Jacksonville State University, Florence State University (now the University of North Alabama), the University of Tennessee at Martin, Troy State University (now Troy University) and Livingston University (now the University of West Alabama), beginning the 1970–71 academic year.
- 1971:
  - The MSAC added more sports to be a full-fledged athletic conference and was rebranded as the Gulf South Conference, beginning the 1971–72 academic year.
  - Nicholls State University, Northwestern State University and Southeastern Louisiana University joined the GSC in the 1971–72 academic year.
- 1972 – Mississippi College (now Mississippi Christian University) joined the GSC in the 1972–73 academic year.
- 1975 – Northwestern State left the GSC to become an NCAA D-II Independent (who would later join the Division I ranks of the National Collegiate Athletic Association (NCAA) and the Trans Atlantic Athletic Conference (TAAC), beginning the 1978–79 school year) after the 1974–75 academic year.
- 1979 – Nicholls State and Southeastern Louisiana left the GSC to become NCAA D-II Independents (who both would later join the NCAA Division I ranks: Nicholls State to the TAAC, beginning the 1982–83 school year as a provisional member; and Southeastern Louisiana to the Gulf Star Conference (GSC), beginning the 1984–85 school year) after the 1978–79 academic year.
- 1981 – Valdosta State College (now Valdosta State University) joined the GSC in the 1981–82 academic year.
- 1983 – West Georgia College (now the University of West Georgia) joined the GSC in the 1983–84 academic year.
- 1991 – Tennessee–Martin (UT Martin) and Troy State left the GSC to become NCAA D-II Independents (who both would later join the NCAA Division I ranks: Tennessee–Martin (UT Martin) to the Ohio Valley Conference (OVC), beginning the 1992–93 school year; and Troy State to the East Coast Conference (ECC), beginning the 1993–94 school year) after the 1990–91 academic year.
- 1992 – Lincoln Memorial University joined the GSC in the 1992–93 academic year.
- 1993:
  - Jacksonville State left the GSC to become an NCAA D-II Independent (who would later join the NCAA Division I ranks and the TAAC, beginning the 1995–96 school year) after the 1992–93 academic year.
  - The University of Alabama in Huntsville, the University of Central Arkansas, Henderson State University and Mississippi University for Women joined the GSC in the 1993–94 academic year.
- 1994 – The University of West Florida joined the GSC in the 1994–95 academic year.
- 1995 – Arkansas Tech University, the University of Arkansas at Monticello, the University of Montevallo and Southern Arkansas University joined the GSC in the 1995–96 academic year.
- 1996:
  - Mississippi College left the GSC to join the NCAA Division III ranks and the American Southwest Conference after the 1995–96 academic year.
  - Christian Brothers University joined the GSC in the 1996–97 academic year.
- 2000 – Harding University and Ouachita Baptist University joined the GSC in the 2000–01 academic year.
- 2003 – MUW left the GSC due to the school announcing to discontinue its athletics program after the 2002–03 academic year.
- 2006 – Two institutions left the GSC to join in their respective new home primary conferences, both effective after the 2005–06 academic year:
  - Central Arkansas to join the NCAA Division I ranks and the Southland Conference
  - and Lincoln Memorial to join the South Atlantic Conference (SAC)
- 2009 – Montevallo left the GSC to join the Peach Belt Conference (PBC) after the 2008–09 academic year.
- 2011:
  - Arkansas Tech, Arkansas–Monticello, Harding, Henderson State, Ouachita Baptist and Southern Arkansas left the GSC to join with a few Oklahoma schools to form the newly created Great American Conference after the 2010–11 academic year. However, only Harding and Ouachita Baptist remained in the GSC as affiliate members for men's soccer just for the 2011 fall season (2011–12 academic year).
  - The University of New Orleans joined the GSC as an associate member for some sports in the 2011–12 academic year.
- 2012:
  - New Orleans left the GSC to fully align with the NCAA Division I ranks (which would later join the Southland, beginning the 2013–14 school year) after the 2011–12 academic year.
  - Shorter University and Union University joined the GSC in the 2012–13 academic year.
- 2013:
  - Lee University joined the GSC in the 2013–14 academic year.
  - Florida Institute of Technology (Florida Tech) joined the GSC as an affiliate member for football in the 2013 fall season (2013–14 academic year).
- 2014:
  - Mississippi College rejoined the GSC in the 2014–15 academic year.
  - Spring Hill College joined the GSC as an affiliate member for women's golf, and men's & women's soccer, all effective in the 2014 fall season (2014–15 academic year).
- 2015 – Young Harris College joined the GSC as an affiliate member for women's lacrosse (with Montevallo rejoining for that sport) in the 2016 spring season (2015–16 academic year).
- 2017 – Auburn University at Montgomery joined the GSC (with Montevallo rejoining for all sports) in the 2017–18 academic year.
- 2018:
  - North Alabama left the GSC to join the NCAA Division I ranks and the ASUN Conference (again now known as the Atlantic Sun Conference) after the 2017–18 academic year.
  - North Greenville University joined the GSC as an affiliate member for football in the 2018 fall season (2018–19 academic year).
- 2020 – Florida Tech left the GSC as an affiliate member for football due to the school discontinuing the sport after the 2019 fall season (2019–20 academic year).
- 2023 – Chowan University joins the GSC as an affiliate member for football in the 2023 and 2024 fall seasons (2023–24 and 2024–25 academic years).
- 2024:
  - Two institutions left the GSC to join in their respective new home primary conferences, both effective after the 2023–24 academic year:
    - Shorter to join the Conference Carolinas (CC)
    - and West Georgia to join NCAA Division I and the Atlantic Sun (ASUN), both effective after the 2023–24 academic year
  - Trevecca Nazarene University joined the GSC in the 2024–25 academic year.
  - Erskine College joined the GSC as an affiliate for football in the 2024 fall season only (2024–25 academic year).
- 2025:
  - Chowan, Erskine, and North Greenville all left the GSC as affiliate members for football to move their programs to Conference Carolinas after the 2024 fall season (2024–25 academic year).
  - Virginia State University joined the GSC as an affiliate member for women's lacrosse in the 2026 spring season (2025–26 academic year).
- 2026 – West Florida left the GSC to join the NCAA Division I ranks and the Atlantic Sun (ASUN) after the 2025–26 academic year.
- 2027:
  - Two institutions will leave the GSC to join in their respective new home primary conferences, both effective after the 2026–27 academic year:
    - Christian Brothers to join the NAIA and the Mid-South Conference (MSC)
    - and Valdosta State to join the Peach Belt (PBC)
  - Flagler will leave the GSC to join the Sunshine State Conference (SSC) for all sports after the 2026–27 academic year, including its GSC affiliated sport of men's lacrosse.
  - Loyola University New Orleans will join the GSC (with Spring Hill joining for all sports), beginning the 2027–28 academic year.

== Member schools ==
=== Current members ===
The GSC currently has 11 full members, with all but five being public schools:

Institution	Location	Founded	Affiliation	Enrollment	Nickname	Joined (Note: Represents the calendar year when fall sports competition begins.)	Colors
University of Alabama in Huntsville	Huntsville, Alabama	1950	Public	8,564	Chargers	1993	
Auburn University at Montgomery	Montgomery, Alabama	1967	Public	5,219	Warhawks	2017	
Christian Brothers University	Memphis, Tennessee	1871	Catholic (FSC)	1,813	Buccaneers	1996	
Delta State University	Cleveland, Mississippi	1924	Public	2,654	Statesmen & Lady Statesmen	1970 (Note: Charter member institution began competition for football during the 1970 fall season (1970–71 school year) as the Mid-South Conference, due to scheduling issues; while later began competing for all sports as the Gulf South Conference, beginning the 1971–72 school year.)	
Lee University	Cleveland, Tennessee	1918	Church of God	3,714	Flames	2013	
Mississippi Christian University	Clinton, Mississippi	1826	Baptist	4,250	Choctaws	1972; 2014 (Note: Mississippi College left the GSC after the 1995–96 school year to join NCAA Division III and the American Southwest Conference; but later rejoined in the 2014–15 school year.)	
University of Montevallo (Note: Montevallo competed in the GSC as an affiliate member for women's lacrosse from the 2016 to 2017 spring seasons (2015–16 to 2016–17 school years).)	Montevallo, Alabama	1896	Public	3,142	Falcons	1995; 2017 (Note: Montevallo left the GSC after the 2008–09 school year to join the Peach Belt Conference, but later rejoined in the 2017–18 school year.)	
Trevecca Nazarene University	Nashville, Tennessee	1901	Church of the Nazarene	3,196	Trojans	2024	
Union University	Jackson, Tennessee	1823	Baptist	2,718	Bulldogs	2012	
Valdosta State University	Valdosta, Georgia	1906	Public	10,305	Blazers	1981	
University of West Alabama	Livingston, Alabama	1835	Public	6,195	Tigers	1970	

=== Future members ===
The GSC will have two new full members, both private schools:

Institution	Location	Founded	Affiliation	Enrollment	Nickname	Joining (Note: Represents the calendar year when fall sports competition begins.)	Colors	Current conference
Loyola University New Orleans	New Orleans, Louisiana	1904	Catholic (Jesuit)	4,351	Wolf Pack	2027		Southern States (SSAC) (Note: Currently an NAIA athletic conference.)
Spring Hill College	Mobile, Alabama	1830	Catholic (Jesuit)	920	Badgers	2027 (Note: Spring Hill has been a GSC affiliate member for men's & women's soccer and women's golf since the 2014–15 school year.)		Southern (SIAC)

=== Affiliate members ===
The GSC currently has four affiliate members, equally split between public and private schools:

Institution	Location	Founded	Affiliation	Enrollment	Nickname	Joined (Note: Represents the calendar year when fall sports competition begins.)	Colors	GSC sport(s)	Primary conference
Flagler College	St. Augustine, Florida	1968	Nonsectarian	2,530	Saints	2021		women's lacrosse	Peach Belt (PBC)
Lander University	Greenwood, South Carolina	1872	Public	4,423	Bearcats	2019		women's lacrosse	Peach Belt (PBC)
Spring Hill College	Mobile, Alabama	1830	Catholic (Jesuit)	920	Badgers	2014		women's golf	Southern (SIAC)
Spring Hill College	Mobile, Alabama	1830	Catholic (Jesuit)	920	Badgers	2014		men's soccer	Southern (SIAC)
Spring Hill College	Mobile, Alabama	1830	Catholic (Jesuit)	920	Badgers	2014		women's soccer	Southern (SIAC)
Virginia State University	Ettrick, Virginia	1882	Public	5,605	Trojans	2025		women's lacrosse	Central (CIAA)

=== Former members ===
The GSC had 20 former full members, with all but four being public schools:

Institution	Location	Founded	Affiliation	Enrollment	Nickname	Joined (Note: Represents the calendar year when fall sports competition begins.)	Left (Note: Represents the calendar year when spring sports competition ends.)	Current conference
Arkansas Tech University	Russellville, Arkansas	1909	Public	12,009	Wonder Boys & Golden Suns	1995	2011	Great American (GAC)
University of Arkansas at Monticello	Monticello, Arkansas	1910	Public	3,659	Boll Weevils & Cotton Blossoms	1995	2011	Great American (GAC)
University of Central Arkansas	Conway, Arkansas	1907	Public	10,869	Bears & Sugar Bears	1993	2006	Atlantic Sun (ASUN) (Note: Currently an NCAA Division I athletic conference.) (United (UAC) in 2026)
Harding University (Note: Harding and Ouachita Baptist competed in the GSC as affiliate members for men's soccer during the 2011 fall season (2011–12 school year).)	Searcy, Arkansas	1924	Churches of Christ	6,009	Bisons & Lady Bisons	2000	2011	Great American (GAC)
Henderson State University	Arkadelphia, Arkansas	1890	Public	3,530	Reddies	1993	2011	Great American (GAC)
Jacksonville State University	Jacksonville, Alabama	1883	Public	9,238	Gamecocks	1970 (Note: Charter member institution began competition for football during the 1970 fall season (1970–71 school year) as the Mid-South Conference, due to scheduling issues; while later began competing for all sports as the Gulf South Conference, beginning the 1971–72 school year.)	1993	Conf. USA (CUSA)
Lincoln Memorial University	Harrogate, Tennessee	1897	Nonsectarian	4,867	Railsplitters	1992	2006	South Atlantic (SAC)
Mississippi University for Women	Columbus, Mississippi	1884	Public	2,479	Blues (Note: Their current nickname is now known as the Owls.)	1993	2003	St. Louis (SLIAC) (Note: Currently an NCAA Division III athletic conference.)
University of New Orleans (Note: New Orleans was a provisional full member in the GSC that competed in baseball, men's & women's cross country, men's & women's golf, men's & women's tennis, and women's volleyball during the 2011–12 school year. The Privateers would later return to the NCAA Division I ranks, and subsequently joined the Southland Conference, beginning the 2013 14 school–year.)	New Orleans, Louisiana	1958	Public	8,511	Privateers	2011	2012	Southland (SLC)
Nicholls State University	Thibodaux, Louisiana	1948	Public	6,366	Colonels	1971	1979	Southland (SLC)
University of North Alabama	Florence, Alabama	1830	Public	7,650	Lions	1970	2018	Atlantic Sun (ASUN) (United (UAC) in 2026)
Northwestern State University	Natchitoches, Louisiana	1884	Public	10,979	Demons	1971	1975	Southland (SLC)
Ouachita Baptist University	Arkadelphia, Arkansas	1886	Baptist	1,569	Tigers	2000	2011	Great American (GAC)
Shorter University	Rome, Georgia	1873	Baptist	1,506	Hawks	2012	2024	Carolinas (CC)
Southeastern Louisiana University	Hammond, Louisiana	1925	Public	14,327	Lions	1971	1979	Southland (SLC)
Southern Arkansas University	Magnolia, Arkansas	1909	Public	4,138	Muleriders	1995	2011	Great American (GAC)
University of Tennessee at Martin	Martin, Tennessee	1927	Public	6,705	Skyhawks	1970	1991	Ohio Valley (OVC)
Troy State University	Troy, Alabama	1887	Public	17,494	Trojans	1970	1991	Sun Belt (SBC)
University of West Florida	Pensacola, Florida	1963	Public	14,797	Argonauts	1994	2026	Atlantic Sun (ASUN)
University of West Georgia	Carrollton, Georgia	1906	Public	11,914	Wolves	1983	2024	Atlantic Sun (ASUN) (United (UAC) in 2026)

=== Former affiliate members ===
The GSC had six former affiliate members, all but one were private schools:

Institution	Location	Founded	Affiliation	Enrollment	Nickname	Joined (Note: Represents the calendar year when fall sports competition begins.)	Left (Note: Represents the calendar year when spring sports competition ends.)	GSC sport(s)	Primary conference	Current conference in GSC sport
Chowan University	Murfreesboro, North Carolina	1848	Baptist	1,316	Hawks	2023	2025	football	Carolinas (CC)	
Erskine College	Due West, South Carolina	1839	Presbyterian	800	Flying Fleet	2024	2025	football	Carolinas (CC)	
Florida Institute of Technology	Melbourne, Florida	1958	Nonsectarian	6,451	Panthers	2013	2020	football	Sunshine State (SSC)	dropped program
University of Montevallo	Montevallo, Alabama	1896	Public	2,559	Falcons	2015	2017	women's lacrosse	Gulf South (GSC) (Note: During its tenure as an affiliate member of the GSC, Montevallo was a full member of the Peach Belt Conference (PBC).)	
North Greenville University	Tigerville, South Carolina	1891	Baptist	2,428	Trailblazers	2018	2025	football	Carolinas (CC)	
Young Harris College	Young Harris, Georgia	1886	United Methodist	1,408	Mountain Lions	2015	2023	women's lacrosse	Carolinas (CC)	

=== Membership timeline ===
Full member (all sports) Full member (non-football) Associate member (football) Associate member (sport)

== Conference venues ==
Future members listed in gray.

School	Football		Basketball	
School	Stadium	Capacity	Arena	Capacity
Alabama–Huntsville	non-football school		Spragins Hall	2,250
Auburn–Montgomery	non-football school		AUM Basketball Complex	2,670
Christian Brothers	non-football school		Canale Arena	1,000
Delta State	McCool Stadium	8,000	Walter Sillers Coliseum	4,000
Lee	non-football school		Walker Arena	2,700
Mississippi Christian	non-football school		A.E. Wood Coliseum	3,500
Montevallo	non-football school		Trustmark Arena	2,000
Spring Hill	non-football school		Arthur R. Outlaw Recreation Center	2,000
Trevecca Nazarene	non-football school		Trojan Fieldhouse	1,500
Union	non-football school		Fred DeLay Gymnasium	2,200
Valdosta State	Bazemore-Hyder Stadium	11,500	The Complex	5,350
West Alabama	Tiger Stadium	7,000	Pruitt Hall	1,500

== Sponsored sports ==
The GSC sponsors competition in 8 men's sports and 9 women's sports. The conference began sponsoring women's lacrosse and men's / women's track & field in the 2015–16 school year.

Conference sports
Sport	Men's	Women's
Baseball	✓	
Basketball	✓	✓
Cross country	✓	✓
Football	✓	
Golf	✓	✓
Lacrosse		✓
Soccer	✓	✓
Softball		✓
Tennis	✓	✓
Track & field outdoor	✓	✓
Volleyball		✓

=== Men's sponsored sports by school ===
School	Baseball	Basketball	Cross country	Football	Golf	Soccer	Tennis	Track & Field outdoor	Total GSC sports
Alabama–Huntsville	✓	✓	✓			✓		✓	5
Auburn–Montgomery	✓	✓	✓			✓	✓		5
Christian Brothers	✓	✓	✓		✓	✓	✓	✓	7
Delta State	✓	✓		✓	✓	✓	✓		6
Lee	✓	✓	✓		✓	✓	✓	✓	7
Mississippi Christian	✓	✓	✓		✓	✓	✓	✓	7
Montevallo	✓	✓	✓		✓	✓	✓	✓	7
Trevecca Nazarene	✓	✓	✓		✓	✓		✓	6
Union	✓	✓	✓		✓	✓			5
Valdosta State	✓	✓	✓	✓	✓		✓		6
West Alabama	✓	✓	✓	✓		✓	✓	✓	7
Totals	11	11	10	3	8	10+1	8	7	69
Affiliate members
Spring Hill						✓			1
Future members
Spring Hill	✓	✓	✓		✓	✓	✓	✓	7

=== Women's sponsored sports by school ===
Departing members in pink.

School	Basketball	Cross country	Golf	Lacrosse	Soccer	Softball	Tennis	Track & field outdoor	Volleyball	Total GSC sports
Alabama–Huntsville	✓	✓		✓	✓	✓		✓	✓	7
Auburn–Montgomery	✓	✓			✓	✓	✓		✓	6
Christian Brothers	✓	✓	✓		✓	✓	✓	✓	✓	8
Delta State	✓	✓			✓	✓	✓			5
Lee	✓	✓	✓	✓	✓	✓	✓	✓	✓	9
Mississippi Christian	✓	✓			✓	✓	✓	✓	✓	7
Montevallo	✓	✓	✓	✓	✓	✓	✓	✓	✓	9
Trevecca Nazarene	✓	✓	✓		✓	✓		✓	✓	7
Union	✓	✓	✓		✓	✓			✓	6
Valdosta State	✓	✓			✓	✓	✓		✓	6
West Alabama	✓	✓			✓	✓	✓	✓	✓	7
Totals	11	11	5+1	3+3	11+1	11	8	9	10	77
Affiliate members
Flagler				✓						1
Lander				✓						1
Spring Hill			✓		✓					2
Virginia State				✓						1
Affiliate members
Spring Hill	✓	✓	✓		✓	✓	✓	✓	✓	8

=== Other sponsored sports by school ===
School	Men				Women				
School	Lacrosse	Swimming & Diving	Track & Field Indoor	Wrestling	Acrobatics & tumbling	Beach volleyball	STUNT	Swimming & Diving	Track & Field Indoor
Alabama–Huntsville	PBC		IND						IND
Delta State		NSISC						NSISC	
Lee			IND						IND
Mississippi Christian			IND						IND
Montevallo	PBC		IND	CC	CC				IND
Spring Hill						IND			
Trevecca Nazarene							GLVC		

== National championships ==
Sport	School	Year(s)
Baseball	Valdosta State	1979
Baseball	Troy	1986 • 1987
Baseball	Jacksonville State	1990 • 1991
Baseball	Delta State	2004
Baseball	West Florida	2011
Men's basketball	North Alabama	1979 • 1991
Men's basketball	Jacksonville State	1985
Women's basketball	Delta State	1975 • 1976 • 1977 • 1989 • 1990 • 1992
Women's basketball	Southeastern Louisiana	1977
Football	West Alabama	1971
Football	Troy	1984 • 1987
Football	Mississippi Christian	1989
Football	Jacksonville State	1992
Football	North Alabama	1993 • 1994 • 1995
Football	Delta State	2000
Football	Valdosta State	2004 • 2007 • 2012 • 2018
Football	West Florida	2019
Men's golf	Troy	1976 • 1977 • 1984
Men's golf	West Florida	2001 • 2008
Men's golf	Lee	2022
Women's golf	Troy	1984 • 1986 • 1989
Women's gymnastics	Jacksonville State	1984 • 1985
Men's ice hockey	Alabama–Huntsville	1996 • 1998
Women's soccer	Christian Brothers	2002
Women's soccer	West Florida	2012
Softball	Valdosta State	2012
Softball	North Alabama	2016
Men's tennis	West Florida	2004 • 2005 • 2014 • 2017
Men's tennis	Valdosta State	2006 • 2011 • 2024 • 2025
Men's track & field outdoor	Southeastern Louisiana	1975
Women's volleyball	North Alabama	2003

- Valdosta State won 1979 baseball national championship prior to joining the GSC.
- Mississippi Christian's 1989 football tournament participation and national championship were vacated by the NCAA Committee on Infractions for recruiting violations.
- Ice hockey is not a conference-sanctioned sport.
