= Darvin Ebanks =

American professional soccer player

Personal information
- Full name: Darvin Ebanks
- Date of birth: May 30, 1993 (age 33)
- Place of birth: Macon, Georgia, United States
- Height: 1.85 m (6 ft 1 in)
- Position: Defender

College career
Years	Team	Apps	(Gls)
2011–2012	North Carolina Tar Heels		
2013–2014	SCAD Bees		

Senior career*
Years	Team	Apps	(Gls)
2015	Georgia Revolution		
2016	Harrisburg City Islanders		
2016–2017	Harrisburg Heat (indoor)		
2017	Hershey FC		
2018	Tormenta FC		

Managerial career
- 2020–2021: Savannah Spirit (assistant)
- * Club domestic league appearances and goals as of 3 February 2020

Darvin Ebanks (born 30 May 1993) is an American professional soccer player and coach.

== Youth and College ==
Ebanks attended Mount de Sales High School where he was considered a 5-star recruit by Top Drawer Soccer. He attended the University of North Carolina where he helped the Tar Heels earn the 2011 Championship Title.

== Club career ==
Ebanks began his professional career with local NPSL side Georgia Revolution, competing in the Southeast Conference of the South Region. During the 2015 season, the Revolution made it to the Southeast Conference playoffs, ultimately losing out to the Atlanta Silverbacks Reserves.

On March 10, 2016, Ebanks signed with USL side Harrisburg City Islanders. he made his first appearance for the City Islanders on May 19, 2016, as a substitute in the 2016 U.S. Open Cup second round against West Chester United. The Islanders won the match 2-0 and advanced to the third round.

== Coaching ==
In 2020, Ebanks joined Women's Premier Soccer League expansion club Savannah Spirit as an assistant coach.

== International ==
Ebanks has participated in the U.S. U-18 National Team training camp in 2011, but has not made any appearances for the team.

== Honors ==
=== North Carolina Tar Heels ===
- NCAA Division I Men's Soccer Championship: 2011 Champions
