= Youssef Naciri =

Moroccan footballer

Personal information
- Date of birth: December 10, 1993 (age 32)
- Place of birth: Casablanca, Morocco
- Height: 6 ft 1 in (1.85 m)
- Position: Midfielder

Youth career
- 1999–2008: Raja Casablanca
- 2008–2010: Wydad Casablanca

College career
Years	Team	Apps	(Gls)
2012	Monroe Mustangs		
2013–2014	Christian Brothers Buccaneers	19	(1)

Senior career*
Years	Team	Apps	(Gls)
2016	Harrisburg City Islanders	2	(0)
2016	Harrisburg Heat (indoor)	2	(0)
2017	Reynir Sandgerði	9	(1)
2021–2024	Steel Pulse	15	(36)
- * Club domestic league appearances and goals as of December 16, 2022

Youssef Naciri (Arabic: يوسف الناصري; born December 10, 1993) is a Moroccan footballer.

== Career ==
Naciri played at both Monroe College and Christian Brothers University, before signing his first professional contract with United Soccer League side Harrisburg City Islanders on April 8, 2016.
