= Richie Laryea =

Canadian soccer player (born 1995)

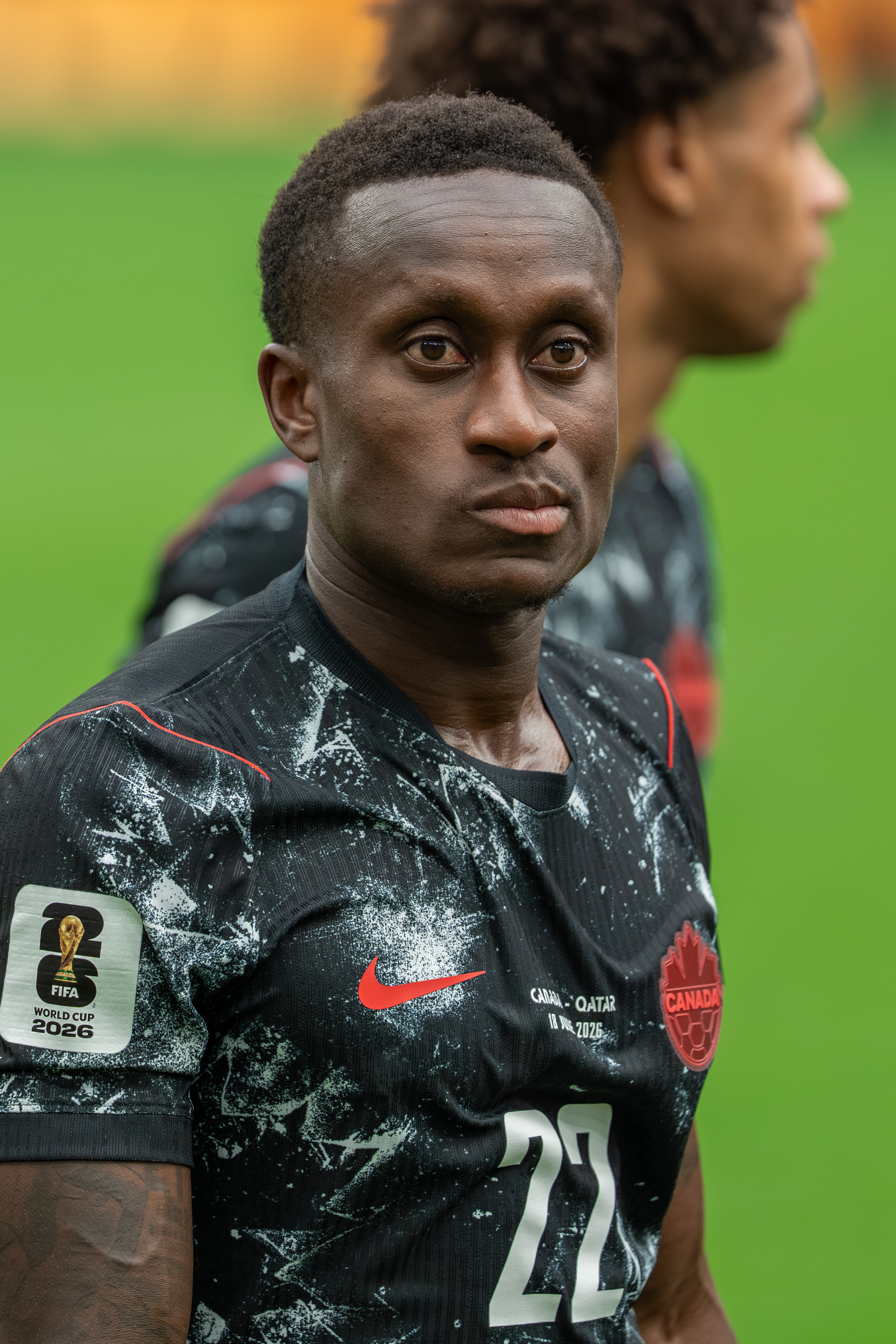
- Laryea with Canada in 2026

Personal information
- Full name: Richmond Mamah Laryea
- Date of birth: January 7, 1995 (age 31)
- Place of birth: Toronto, Ontario, Canada
- Height: 1.75 m (5 ft 9 in)
- Position: Defender

Team information
- Current team: Toronto FC
- Number: 22

Youth career
- 2004–2008: Club Uruguay
- 2008–2014: Sigma FC

College career
Years	Team	Apps	(Gls)
2014–2015	Akron Zips	42	(12)

Senior career*
Years	Team	Apps	(Gls)
2015	Sigma FC	9	(5)
2016–2018	Orlando City SC	21	(0)
2016–2017	→ Orlando City B (loan)	35	(3)
2019–2021	Toronto FC	67	(8)
2022–2024	Nottingham Forest	5	(0)
2022–2023	→ Toronto FC (loan)	28	(2)
2023	→ Vancouver Whitecaps FC (loan)	12	(1)
2024–	Toronto FC	56	(4)

International career^{‡}
2016	Canada U23	2	(1)
2019–	Canada	85	(1)
2026	Canada B	1	(0)
Medal record
Representing Canada
Men's soccer
CONCACAF Nations League
Runner-up	2023
- * Club domestic league appearances and goals as of November 7, 2026 ‡ National team caps and goals as of November 16, 2026

Richmond Mamah Laryea (/ləˈreɪjə/ La-RAY-a; Ga: /ˈlɑːji/ LAH-yee; born January 7, 1995) is a Canadian professional soccer player who plays as a right-back or midfielder for Major League Soccer club Toronto FC and the Canada national team.

== College career ==
Prior to his college career, Laryea played for Sigma FC Academy and Dante Alighieri Academy in Toronto. Laryea played college soccer at the University of Akron for two seasons, reaching the College Cup semi-finals in 2015.

Laryea was named to the All-Mid-American Conference Second Team in 2014, and was named to the All-Mid-American Conference First Team in 2015. Following his sophomore season, Laryea signed a contract with Generation Adidas.

== Club career ==
=== Sigma FC ===
Laryea played for League1 Ontario club Sigma FC in 2015, where he was named a League All-Star.

=== Orlando City ===
Laryea was drafted in the first round (seventh overall) of the 2016 MLS SuperDraft by Orlando City. He was loaned to Orlando City B in March 2016.

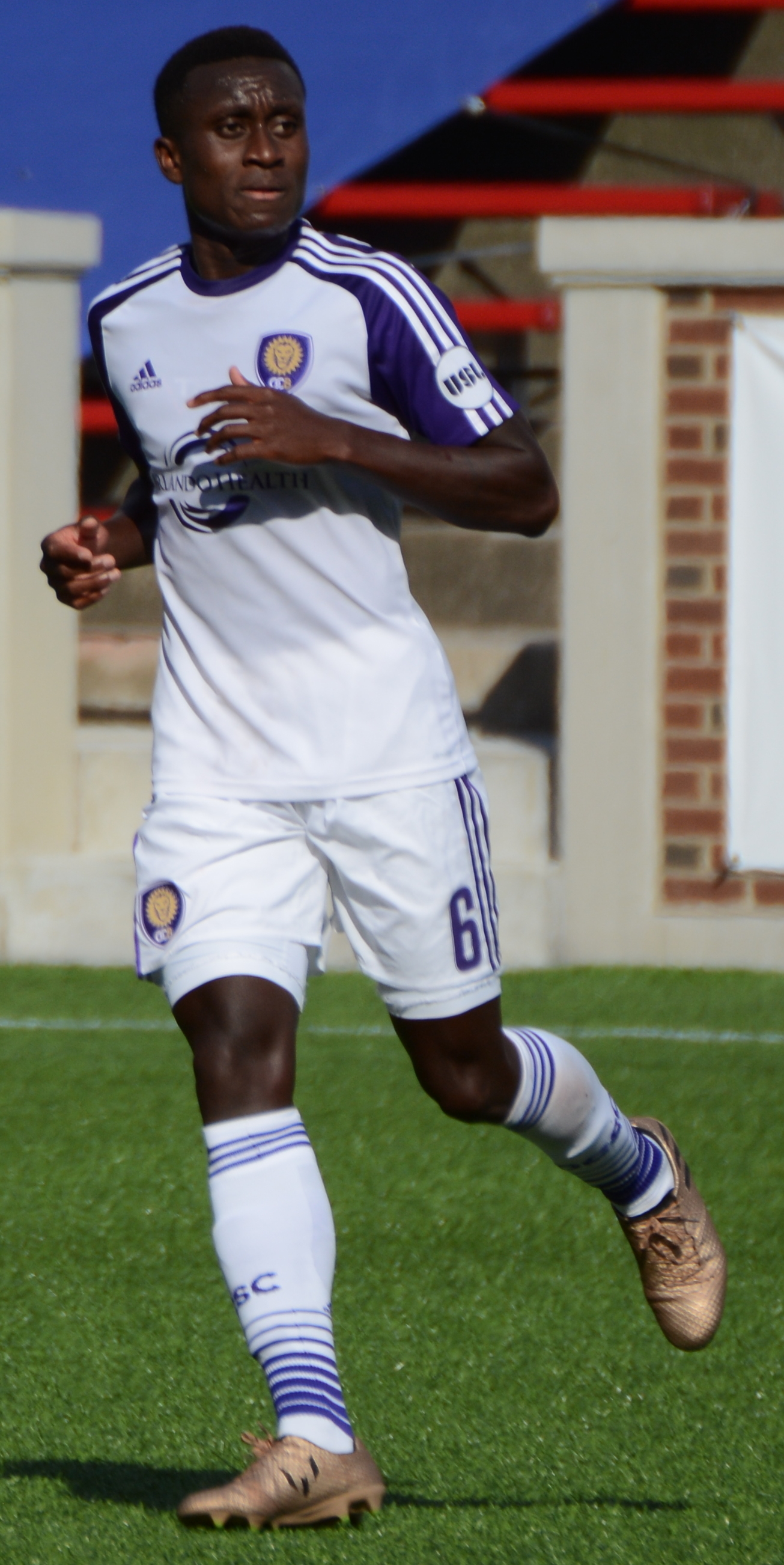
Laryea playing for Orlando City B in 2017

After spending the first half of his second season once again on loan to OCB playing as both an attacking and defensive midfielder, Laryea made his MLS debut on June 25, 2017, subbing on for Kaká in a 4–0 defeat to Chicago Fire. Laryea got his first MLS assist on September 27, 2017, assisting on Yoshimar Yotún's goal against New England Revolution. He made his first career MLS start on the final day of the season away to Philadelphia Union.

On November 27, 2018, the club announced they had declined his contract option.

=== Toronto FC ===
On March 21, 2019, Laryea signed for MLS side Toronto FC. Laryea scored his first goal for Toronto on May 26, 2019, in a 2–1 home defeat to the San Jose Earthquakes, was also his first MLS goal. Laryea scored his first playoff goal, against DC United, and then defeated Atlanta United FC to win the Eastern Conference (MLS) playoffs. Laryea and Toronto FC then lost to Seattle Sounders FC in the 2019 MLS Cup final. Laryea would have his option for the 2020 season exercised by Toronto, keeping him with the club for 2020.

On September 27, 2020, Laryea scored a solo goal and provided two assists in the second half of Toronto's 3–1 win against the league-leading Columbus Crew. Laryea was named the MLS Player of the Week as a result of his performance.

=== Nottingham Forest ===
On January 8, 2022, EFL Championship club Nottingham Forest signed Laryea on a transfer from Toronto FC, signing a three-and-a-half-year contract. After featuring only sparingly in Forest's matchday squads during his first few months, Laryea made his debut on April 18 against West Bromwich Albion, as a second-half substitute for Djed Spence in an eventual 4–0 victory.

==== Loans to Toronto and Vancouver ====
In August 2022, he returned on loan to Toronto FC until the end of June 2023. To complete the transaction, Toronto sent $225,000 in General Allocation Money to FC Dallas and $125,000 in General Allocation Money to FC Cincinnati to acquire the top spot in the MLS Allocation Order.

On August 2, 2023, Laryea was loaned to Canadian MLS side Vancouver Whitecaps FC. In January 2024, it was confirmed that Laryea's move would not be made permanent, and that his time with the club had ended.

Reflecting on his spell with Nottingham Forest, Laryea later described it as "a lot of pressure, a lot of stress", saying it taught him to focus on small details, match "margins", and block out outside noise.

=== Return to Toronto ===
In February 2024, he returned to Toronto FC on a permanent transfer, signing a contract through 2026 with an option for 2027.

== International career ==
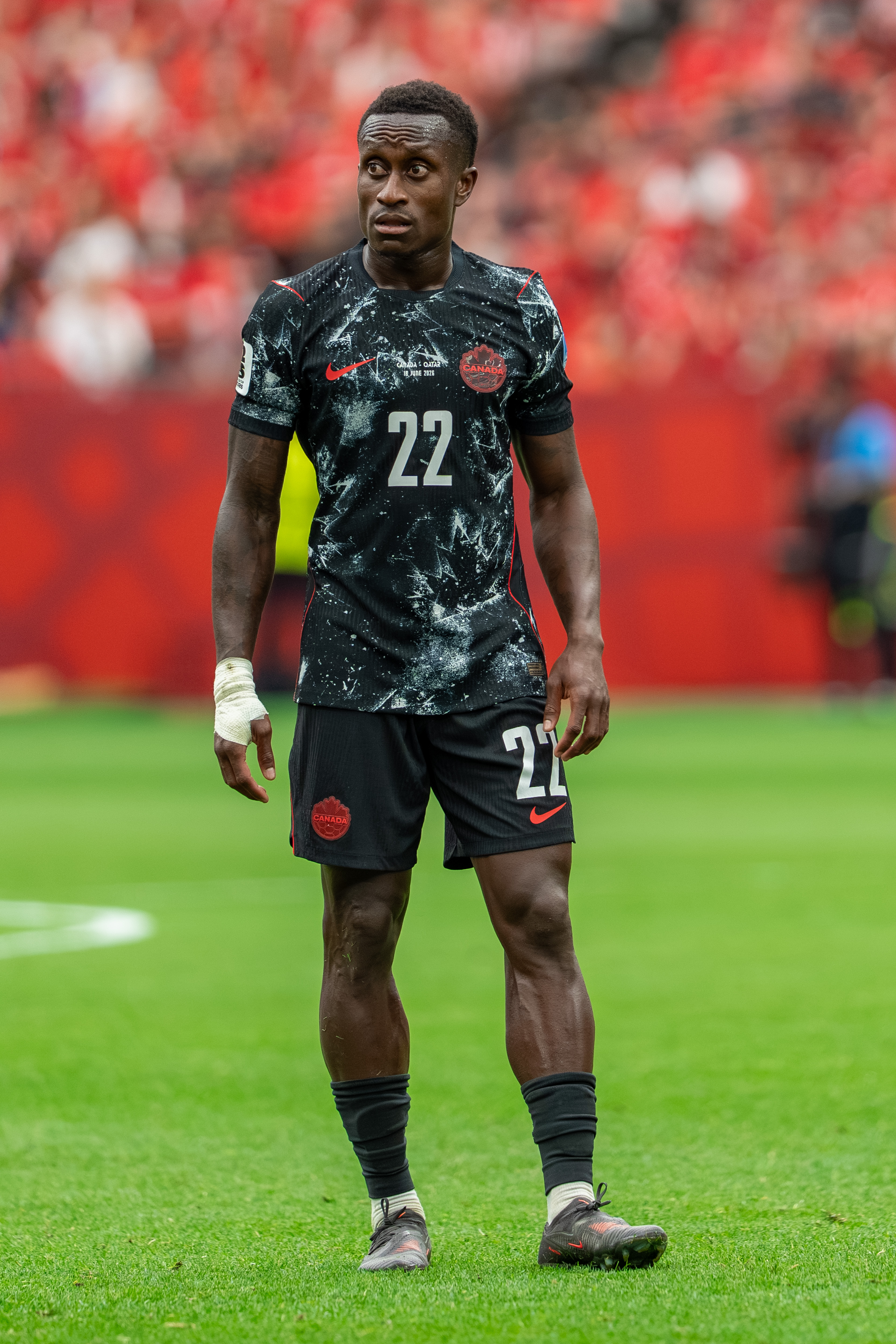
Laryea with Canada at the 2026 FIFA World Cup

In May 2016, Laryea was called to Canada's U23 national team for a pair of friendlies against Guyana and Grenada. Laryea scored in the opening match against Guyana.

Laryea received his first call up to the senior team on August 26, 2019, for two CONCACAF Nations League matches against Cuba. He made his debut in the first match on September 7, 2019.

On March 25, 2021, Laryea scored his first goal for Canada in a 5–1 win over Bermuda in the team's first 2022 World Cup qualifying match.

In June 2021, Laryea was named to Canada's 60-man preliminary squad for the 2021 CONCACAF Gold Cup. On July 1, he was named to the final 23-man squad. Canada went on to reach the semi-finals of the tournament, where they were defeated 2–1 by Mexico.

In November 2022, Laryea was called up to the squad for the 2022 FIFA World Cup. Reflecting on Canada's group stage exit at the tournament, Laryea said it taught the squad that international football is "a game of margins", emphasizing the importance of taking chances and limiting opponents' threats against elite opposition.

In June 2023, Laryea was named to Canada's final squad for the 2023 CONCACAF Nations League Finals, with Canada reaching the final, only to suffer a 2–0 defeat against the United States. On June 19, Laryea was named to the 23-man squad for the 2023 CONCACAF Gold Cup.

In June 2024, Laryea was called-up to the Canadian squad for the 2024 Copa América, where the team achieved a fourth-place finish, losing 4–3 to Uruguay on penalties in the third place play-off following a 2–2 draw.

On May 29, 2026, Laryea was selected in the 26-man squad for the 2026 FIFA World Cup. Deputising for injured captain Alphonso Davies at left-back, Laryea started in all five of Canada's matches as they reached the round of 16.

== Style of play ==
Laryea has described his game as built on work rate and "max effort", saying that on the teams he played for growing up, bringing maximum effort in training and matches was considered the bare minimum expected of him and that this standard has carried through his professional career. In a 2026 interview, he said that Canada's men's team press hard, force turnovers and play at full speed, and that this playing style "coincides pretty nicely" with how he likes to play. He also said that experiences in England taught him to cope with pressure, focusing on what he knows he can do and not making major occasions "bigger than what they actually are".

Canadian sports media has highlighted Laryea as a quick, physical, and versatile full-back or wing-back who can play on either flank, in midfield and occasionally at centre-back, turning defence into attack with his ball-carrying and forward runs. Toronto FC head coach Robin Fraser has praised his “incredible intensity” and ability to get into dangerous positions and create penalties, calling Laryea “a world-class international defender”. Laryea is also known for his use of physical duels and on-field banter to get under opponents’ skin and provide the “edge” that teams look for at the international level.

== Personal life ==
Laryea is of Ghanaian descent. His younger brother, Reggie Laryea, plays soccer for semi-professional team Vaughan Azzurri.

In 2026, Laryea appeared on the cover of Canadian soccer magazine DARBY's sixth issue, "HOME", in a feature that discussed his understanding of home and his leadership role with Canada ahead of the 2026 FIFA World Cup on home soil.

== Career statistics ==
=== Club ===
As of match played November 7, 2026

Appearances and goals by club, season and competition
Club	Season	League			Playoffs		National cup		Continental		Other		Total	
Club	Season	Division	Apps	Goals	Apps	Goals	Apps	Goals	Apps	Goals	Apps	Goals	Apps	Goals
Sigma FC	2015	League1 Ontario	9	5	—		—		—		3 (Note: Appearances in League1 Ontario League Cup)	2	12	7
Orlando City B	2016	USL	23	0	0	0	–		—		—		23	0
Orlando City B	2017	USL	12	3	—		—		—		—		12	3
Orlando City B	Total		35	3	0	0	—		—		—		35	3
Orlando City SC	2017	MLS	12	0	—		0	0	—		—		12	0
Orlando City SC	2018	MLS	9	0	—		0	0	—		—		9	0
Orlando City SC	Total		21	0	—		0	0	—		—		21	0
Toronto FC	2019	MLS	20	1	4	1	4	0	—		—		28	2
Toronto FC	2020	MLS	20 (Note: Includes two appearances and one goal in MLS is Back Tournament group stage)	4	1	0	—		—		1 (Note: Appearance in MLS is Back Tournament knockout stage)	0	22	4
Toronto FC	2021	MLS	27	3	—		3	0	3 (Note: Appearances in CONCACAF Champions League)	0	—		33	3
Toronto FC	Total		67	8	5	1	7	0	3	0	1	0	83	9
Nottingham Forest	2021–22	Championship	5	0	—		0	0	—		0	0	5	0
Toronto FC (loan)	2022	MLS	10	0	—		0	0	—		—		10	0
Toronto FC (loan)	2023	MLS	18	2	—		1	0	—		—		19	2
Toronto FC (loan)	Total		28	2	—		1	0	—		—		29	2
Vancouver Whitecaps FC (loan)	2023	MLS	12	1	2	0	0	0	—		—		14	1
Toronto FC	2024	MLS	12	1	—		2	0	—		3 (Note: Appearances in Leagues Cup)	0	17	1
Toronto FC	2025	MLS	17	1	—		0	0	—		—		17	1
Toronto FC	2026	MLS	27	2	—		0	0	—		—		27	2
Toronto FC	Total		56	4	—		2	0	—		3	0	61	4
Career total			233	23	7	1	10	0	3	0	8	2	261	26

=== International ===
As of match played November 16, 2026

Appearances and goals by national team and year
National team	Year	Apps	Goals
Canada	2019	4	0
Canada	2020	2	0
Canada	2021	16	1
Canada	2022	15	0
Canada	2023	11	0
Canada	2024	12	0
Canada	2025	11	0
Canada	2026	14	0
Total		85	1

As of March 25, 2021. Scores and results list Canada's goal tally first, score column indicates score after each Laryea goal.

List of international goals scored by Richie Laryea
No.	Date	Venue	Cap	Opponent	Score	Result	Competition
1	March 25, 2021	Exploria Stadium, Orlando, United States	7	Bermuda	3–0	5–1	2022 FIFA World Cup qualification

== Honours ==
Toronto FC

- Eastern Conference Championship (Playoffs): 2019

Nottingham Forest

- EFL Championship play-offs: 2022

Individual

- MLS All-Star: 2026
