= Christian Brothers Buccaneers and Lady Buccaneers =

Intercollegiate sports teams of Christian Brothers University

- University: Christian Brothers University
- Nickname: Bucs and Lady Bucs
- NCAA: Division II
- Conference: Gulf South
- Athletic director: Ricky Jackson (interim)
- Location: Memphis, Tennessee
- Varsity teams: 16 (7 men's, 9 women's)
- Basketball arena: Canale Arena
- Baseball stadium: Nadicksbernd Field
- Softball stadium: Bland Field
- Soccer stadium: Signaigo Field
- Colors: Red and gray
- Mascot: Bucky the Buccaneer
- Website: cbubucs.com
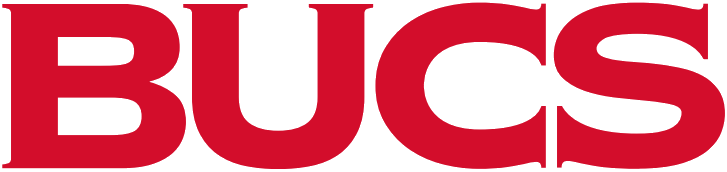

Team NCAA championships
- 1

The Christian Brothers University Buccaneers and Lady Buccaneers are the athletic teams that represent Christian Brothers University, located in Memphis, Tennessee, in intercollegiate sports at the Division II level of the National Collegiate Athletic Association (NCAA). The Buccaneers have primarily competed in the Gulf South Conference since the 1996–97 academic year.

Christian Brothers competes in 17 intercollegiate varsity sports. Men's sports include baseball, basketball, cross country, golf, soccer, tennis, and track and field (indoor and outdoor); while women's sports include basketball, cross country, golf, soccer, softball, tennis, track and field (indoor and outdoor), and volleyball.

== Conference affiliations ==
The Buccaneers began playing in the 1950s as independents. Over the last half-century, CBU has competed in the NAIA Division I in the Volunteer State Athletic Conference and the Tennessee Collegiate Athletic Conference. CBU has been a member of the NCAA Division II and a member of the Gulf South Conference since 1996.

NAIA

- Volunteer State Athletic Conference (?–1985)
- Tennessee Collegiate Athletic Conference (1985–1996)
- Mid-South Conference (2027–onward)

NCAA

- Gulf South Conference (1996–2027)

== Varsity teams ==
| Men's sports | Women's sports |
|---|---|
| Baseball | Basketball |
| Basketball | Cross country |
| Cross country | Golf |
| Golf | Soccer |
| Soccer | Softball |
| Tennis | Tennis |
| Track and field^{†} | Track and field^{†} |
| | Volleyball |
† – Track and field includes both indoor and outdoor

15% of students participate in intercollegiate sports. Each of these sports, with the exception of golf, offers scholarships to student athletes.

=== Other athletics at CBU ===
In addition to intercollegiate athletics, CBU offers intramural sports. Types of intramurals, such as volleyball, flag football, and bowling, vary from year to year.

== Facilities ==
Buccaneer and Lady Buccaneer basketball and volleyball teams play at Canale Arena.

== Accomplishments ==
=== Teams ===
==== Lady Buccaneer soccer ====
- NCAA Division II national champions, 2002
- Gulf South Conference champions, 2000, 2001 2002, 2003, 2004
  - The first Gulf South Conference team to win five consecutive GSC tournaments
  - The first five-time Gulf South Conference winner

==== Buccaneer soccer ====
- Memphis Cup winners, 2004
- Tim McCage Cup winners, 2007

==== Buccaneer basketball ====
- Gulf South Conference Champions, 2008, 2012
- NCAA South Regional Champions, 2008
- Beat Memphis Tigers Basketball in a 2014 exhibition match (2 overtimes).

=== Individuals ===
- Missy Gregg, Lady Buccaneer Soccer
  - First-team, All-American
  - NCAA Tournament Outstanding Offensive Player
  - Two-time NSCAA Player of the Year in all divisions
  - Tennessee Sports Hall of Fame Female Amateur Athlete of the Year
  - Gulf South Conference All-American team
  - Honda Award Winner: Division II Athlete of the Year

== Notable alumni ==
=== Men's soccer ===
- Youssef Naciri
- Chandler O'Dwyer

=== Women's soccer ===
- Margaret Saurin
