= Shane Johnson (soccer) =

American soccer player

Personal information
- Full name: Shane Johnson
- Date of birth: December 11, 1989 (age 36)
- Place of birth: Ashburn, Virginia, United States
- Height: 1.91 m (6 ft 3 in)
- Position: Defender

Youth career
- 2008–2011: Longwood Lancers

Senior career*
Years	Team	Apps	(Gls)
2011	Real Maryland Monarchs	15	(1)
2012–2015	Richmond Kickers	43	(2)
2014–2015	→ Harrisburg City Islanders (loan)	23	(0)
2016	Harrisburg City Islanders	16	(1)
- * Club domestic league appearances and goals as of October 1, 2016

Shane Johnson (born December 11, 1989) is an American soccer player.

== Career ==
=== Youth and college ===
Johnson played soccer at Longwood University in Farmville, Virginia, where he started 70 matches and was named to the NSCAA Soccer Scholar All-East Region second team and was a first team All-Atlantic Soccer Conference honoree.

In 2011, Johnson played with Real Maryland Monarchs of the USL Premier Development League.

=== Professional ===
Johnson signed with the Richmond Kickers on March 9, 2012, and began the 2012 season as one of the starting central defenders, playing every minute in the first eight games. Johnson re-signed with the Kickers for the 2013 season on October 1, 2012.

Midway through the 2014 season, Johnson joined the Harrisburg City Islanders on loan. After only making two appearances for Harrisburg in 2014, Johnson returned on loan for the 2015 season where he became a regular starter for the Islanders. During the 2016 season, Johnson fully signed on with Harrisburg.
