= Christian Brothers University =

Catholic university in Memphis, Tennessee, U.S.

- Former name: Christian Brothers College (1871–1990)
- Motto: Virtus et Scientia (Latin)
- Motto in English: Virtue & Knowledge
- Type: Private university
- Established: 1871; 155 years ago
- Founder: Brother Maurelian Sheel
- Accreditation: SACS
- Religious affiliation: Roman Catholic Church, De La Salle Christian Brothers
- Academic affiliations: ACCU, CIC
- Endowment: $35,000,000
- President: Chris Englert
- Faculty: Full-time - 85; Part-time - 123 (spring 2024)
- Students: 1,772 (fall 2024)
- Undergraduates: 1,155 (fall 2024)
- Postgraduates: 617 (fall 2024)
- Location: Memphis, Tennessee, United States; 35.1274°N 89.9823°W
- Campus: Urban, 76 acres (310,000 m^{2})
- Colors: Red and Gray
- Nickname: Buccaneers & Lady Buccaneers
- Sporting affiliations: NCAA Division II; Gulf South Conference
- Mascot: The Buccaneer
- Website: cbu.edu

Christian Brothers University is a private Catholic university in Memphis, Tennessee, United States. It was founded in 1871 by the De La Salle Christian Brothers, a Catholic teaching order.

== History ==
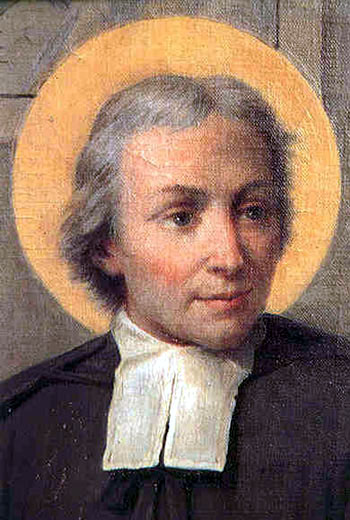
Saint John Baptist de la Salle

Founded on November 19, 1871, it was established by members of the Institute of the Brothers of the Christian Schools, a Catholic religious order founded by St. John Baptist de la Salle, the patron saint of teachers. At foundation the educational institution was named Christian Brothers College, which was changed to Christian Brothers University when the school became a university in June 1990.

Christian Brothers awarded the first post-secondary degree in the city in 1875. LeMoyne College (one of the two constituent parts of present-day LeMoyne-Owen College) has a founding year of 1871, but it was an elementary and secondary school at the time. The city's largest university, the University of Memphis, was not founded until 1912. Although Rhodes College was founded in 1848, it did not move from Clarksville, Tennessee to Memphis until 1925.

Maurelian was appointed the first president. His three terms as president totalled 31 years.

In 2021, the university began to experience severe issues with accreditation caused by emerging financial challenges. The university's physician's assistant program was placed on probation by its accreditor, the Accreditation Review Commission on Education for the Physician Assistant (ARC-PA); its accreditation was denied entirely in 2023 and the program is being closed. In 2022, the university's education programs were placed on probation by the Council for the Accreditation of Educator Preparation (CAEP). The university as a whole was also placed on probation by its institutional accreditor, the Southern Association of Colleges and Schools Commission on Colleges. Full accreditation was restored to the university's undergraduate education programs in October 2022 and the university's graduate education programs in October of 2024.

In 2023, the university publicly acknowledged severe financial challenges. By the end of 2024, the university projected a deficit of between $5 and $7 million. It declared financial exigency and began plans to make significant budget cuts, including the potential firing of tenured faculty and closure of academic programs. In December of 2023 the university announced that it was eliminating 28 faculty positions at the end of the academic year and dropping programs including Chemistry, Cultural Studies, Ecology, Engineering Physics, English, History, History Education, Liberal Studies, Physics, Politics and Law, and Political Science; the university also planned to close the Master of Education program. Art Therapy and Philosophy concentrations was also planned to be cut. In November of 2024, the university again made faculty and staff cuts, eliminating 20 full-time and part-time positions.

== Academics ==
=== Schools ===
The university has four schools:

- Rosa Deal School of Arts
- Gadomski School of Engineering
- School of Business
- School of Sciences

The Rosa Deal School of Arts supports undergraduate programs in Psychology, Creative Writing, English for Corporate Communications, Neuroscience, BFA programs in Studio Arts and in Graphic Design, as well as, Religion and Philosophy. It also offers undergraduate and graduate programs in Education, leading to licensure and add-on endorsements. The School houses a Master of Science in Clinical Mental Health Counseling.

=== Accreditation ===
The university is accredited by the Southern Association of Colleges and Schools. The university is currently on probation due to a number of major shortfalls including financial struggles and student recruitment and retention issues.

The university's Gadomski School of Engineering has four engineering programs, including Chemical Engineering, Civil Engineering, Electrical Engineering, and Mechanical Engineering, that are accredited by the Accreditation Board for Engineering and Technology (ABET).

In 2023, the physician's assistant program was accredited by the Accreditation Review Commission on Education for the Physician Assistant (ARC-PA) but lost its accreditation in 2023 after being placed on probation in 2021.

The university's teacher education programs are accredited by the Council for the Accreditation of Educator Preparation (CAEP).

=== Study abroad ===
As a member of the Lasallian Consortium, i.e. the seven Lasallian universities in the United States, CBU offers study abroad semesters in Australia, Brazil, China, England, France, Ireland, Italy, Mexico, South Africa, and Spain.

== Facilities ==
=== Campus ===
Buckman Hall

Christian Brothers University is located on a 75-acre (300,000 m^{2}) wooded campus in the heart of Midtown, Memphis, four miles (6 km) east of Downtown. It is across from the Memphis Fairgrounds, home of the Simmons Bank Liberty Stadium, and diagonally positioned from the Cooper-Young Neighborhood.

The first building on campus, Kenrick Hall, constructed in 1939 as the original Christian Brothers High School, was demolished in 2015 to make room for the Rosa Deal School of Arts, set to open in January 2017. In 2021, CBU installed a manufactured building, which houses the nursing program. The campus includes the Rosa Deal School of Arts, Cooper Wilson Sciences Building, and the Benilde Hall Engineering Lab, which is currently being expanded, as well as sports facilities for basketball, volleyball, soccer, baseball, and softball.

The university's architecture follows the Georgian style popular at the time of the campus' relocation to East Parkway. Arch-covered walkways traverse the main campus, allowing students and faculty to get to most buildings shielded from the weather. The campus is enclosed by an iron fence with brick accents with entrances on East Parkway South, Central Avenue, and Avery Avenue. Security gates have been added to facilities on the north side of the campus in 2023.

== Student life ==
=== Athletics ===
CBU is an NCAA Division II program and a member of the Gulf South Conference. Buccaneer teams include baseball, basketball, cross country, golf, soccer, tennis, indoor track & field and outdoor track & field. Lady Buccaneer teams include basketball, cross country, golf, soccer, softball, STUNT, tennis, indoor track & field, outdoor track & field and volleyball.

The Lady Buccaneers and Buccaneers have won multiple conference and national championships, including the 2002 Division II women's soccer championship and the 2008 GSC men's basketball championship. The men's soccer team won back-to-back conference titles under coach Clint Browne during the 2011 and 2012 seasons, earning a spot in the NCAA Tournament in 2011, and most recently won the Gulf South Conference Tournament title in 2022 under coach Enda Crehan and advanced to the NCAA National Tournament.

=== Greek life ===
21% of male students and 24% of female students are members of fraternities and sororities.

Campus Greek councils include the Interfraternity Council (IFC), the Panhellenic Council (NPC), and the National Pan-Hellenic Council (NPHC).

=== Honor societies and professional organizations ===
Chapters of a number of honor societies exist at CBU to recognize excellence in academia and leadership. Active honor societies and their specialties include: Alpha Chi (general academic), Beta Beta Beta (biology), the Order of Omega (fraternity and sorority members), Phi Alpha Theta (history), Psi Chi (psychology), Sigma Tau Delta (English), Alpha Psi Omega (theatre), and Tau Beta Pi (engineering).

Professional organizations include: American Institute of Chemical Engineers, American Society of Civil Engineers, American Society of Mechanical Engineers, Institute of Electrical Engineers, Society of Physics Students, and the Student Affiliates of the American Chemical Society.

== Notable people ==
=== Alumni ===
- Harry B. Anderson – United States district judge for the Western District of Tennessee
- Charles Bartliff – soccer player and Olympian
- Ray Crone – professional baseball player
- Zach Curlin – college basketball coach
- Robert B. Hawley – U.S. representative for Texas's 10th congressional district from 1897 to 1901 and accomplished businessman
- Thomas Aquinas Higgins – senior United States district judge of the United States District Court for the Middle District of Tennessee
- Bill Justis – rock and roll pioneer
- Robert W. Marshall – Bishop of the Diocese of Alexandria
- Youssef Naciri – professional soccer player
- Chandler O'Dwyer – current professional soccer player
- David Parker – member of the Mississippi State Senate
- Malcolm R. Patterson – governor of Tennessee (1907–1911)
- Chip Saltsman – Republican political strategist and presidential campaign manager
- Kevin H. Sharp – United States district judge of the United States District Court for the Middle District of Tennessee

=== Faculty (current and former) ===
- Arun Manilal Gandhi, scholar and peace activist
- Jeffrey Gros, Catholic theologian and ecumenist

== See also ==
- Eiffel Tower (Paris, Tennessee)
- Christian Brothers High School (Memphis, Tennessee)
- La Salle University
