= Cardel Benbow =

Jamaican footballer (born 1995)

Personal information
- Full name: Cardel Cardus Benbow
- Date of birth: 3 June 1995 (age 31)
- Place of birth: Portmore, Saint Catherine, Jamaica
- Height: 1.63 m (5 ft 4 in)
- Position: Midfielder

Team information
- Current team: Waterhouse
- Number: 19

Senior career*
Years	Team	Apps	(Gls)
2014	Tampa Marauders	13	(4)
2014–2015	Waterhouse	26	(2)
2015–2017	Harrisburg City Islanders	65	(5)
2017	→ Portmore United (loan)	2	(0)
2017–2018	Waterhouse	23	(2)
2018–2021	Mount Pleasant F.A.	7	(2)
2022–	Waterhouse	3	(1)

International career^{‡}
2010–2011	Jamaica U17	6	(1)
2014–2015	Jamaica U20	3	(0)
2014–	Jamaica	2	(0)
- * Club domestic league appearances and goals as of 11:43, 19 October 2017 (UTC) ‡ National team caps and goals as of 22 May 2019 (UTC)

Cardel Cardus Benbow (born 3 June 1995) is a Jamaican international footballer who plays as a midfielder for Waterhouse.

== Career ==
=== Club ===
Benbow has played club football for Tampa Marauders and Waterhouse. In 2015, Benbow signed with Harrisburg City Islanders. In 2017, Benbow re-signed with Harrisburg on a two-year contract. After spending the 2017–2018 season with Waterhouse, in August 2018, Benbow transferred to Mount Pleasant Football Academy in the Red Stripe Premiere League.

=== International ===
He made his international debut for Jamaica in 2014. In 2015 Benbow played for Jamaica u20s in the CONCACAF final round.
