= Jamie Thomas (soccer, born 1992) =

American professional soccer player

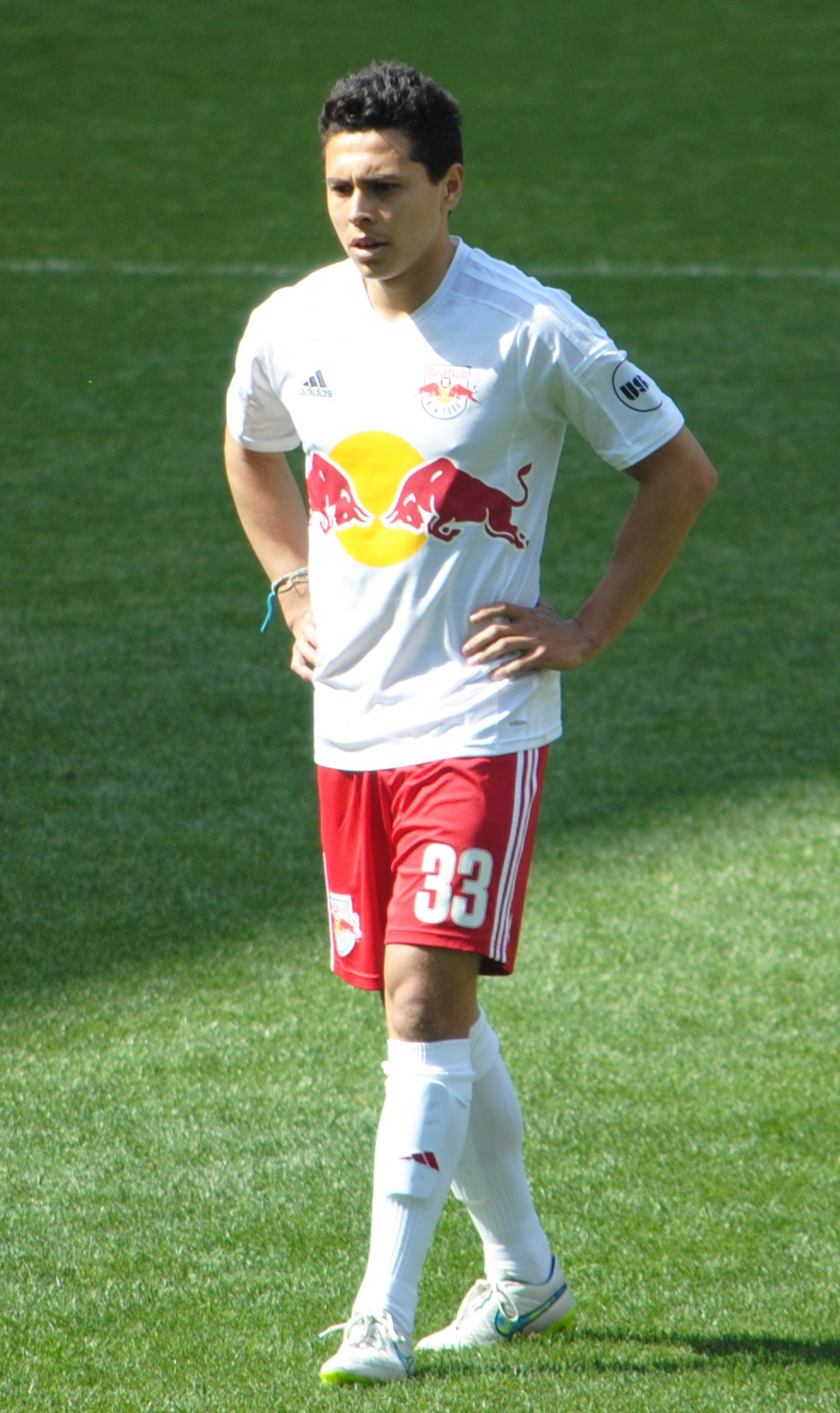

Personal information
- Full name: James Alexander Thomas
- Date of birth: May 22, 1992 (age 34)
- Place of birth: Silver Spring, Maryland, United States
- Height: 1.70 m (5 ft 7 in)
- Position: Defender

Team information
- Current team: Baltimore Blast
- Number: 17

Youth career
- 2000–2006: MSC United
- 2006–2010: Pachuca Internationals

College career
Years	Team	Apps	(Gls)
2010–2013	St. John's Red Storm		

Senior career*
Years	Team	Apps	(Gls)
2015	New York Red Bulls II	23	(0)
2016–2017	Harrisburg City Islanders	50	(1)
2016–	Baltimore Blast (indoor)	138	(50)
- * Club domestic league appearances and goals as of November 27, 2024

Jamie Thomas (born May 22, 1992) is an American professional soccer player who plays for the Baltimore Blast of the Major Arena Soccer League.

== Career ==
=== Youth and college ===
Thomas began playing club soccer at the age of 8 for the MSC United (Montgomery Soccer Club) in Rockville, Maryland, under Coach Julio Arjona Sr. from 2000 to 2006. While playing on the MSC United 92 team, Thomas helped the team win the 2002 U-10 National Futsal Championship in Las Vegas, Nevada and the 2003 U-12 National Futsal Championship in Long Beach, California, as well as winning the following tournaments: NCSL Division 1 four times; CASL Shootout, Raleigh, NC; Bethesda, MD; Potomac, MD; Del Sol, Arizona; DELCO, PA; Kirkwood, DE; and YMS, PA. Thomas was also named to the Maryland ODP Region I roster.

In 2006, Thomas began playing club soccer for the Pachuca Internationals in Maryland, under Coach Pete Mehlert, where Thomas helped them win the U-17 Maryland State Cup Championship in 2009 and the 2009 Surf Cup U-19 Super Group Championship.

Thomas played college soccer for St. John's University from 2010 to 2013. While with the Red Storm he was a four-year starter and made 80 appearances scoring 1 goal. Thomas helped the team win the 2011 Big East Conference Men's Soccer Tournament and earned second team All-BIG EAST honors. Thomas was named to the All-Tournament Team for his defensive efforts and helped his team win the Gamecock Classic.

=== Professional ===
==== New York Red Bulls II ====
Thomas signed with New York Red Bulls II for the 2015 season and made his debut as a starter for the side in its first ever match on March 28, 2015, in a 0–0 draw with Rochester Rhinos. On August 2, 2015, Thomas recorded his first assist for New York on a counterattack feed to Marius Obekop helping New York to a 2–1 victory against Saint Louis FC. Thomas was named to the USL Team of the Week for his performance on August 29, 2015, in a 2–0 victory over Wilmington Hammerheads FC. Thomas helped New York to a second straight shutout victory and assisted Manolo Sanchez on the game-winning goal during the match.

==== Harrisburg City Islanders ====
In March 2016, it was announced that Thomas has signed with Harrisburg City Islanders. Thomas would become a regular starter for the City Islanders, making 27 league appearances and 3 U.S. Open Cup appearances in his first season.

==== Baltimore Blast ====
In November 2016, it was announced that Thomas would spend the USL offseason with the MASL club Baltimore Blast on loan from Harrisburg.
