= Titan Soccer Complex =

Soccer stadium in Melbourne, Florida

- Interactive map of Titan Soccer Complex
- Location: 3865 N Wickham Road; Melbourne, Florida 32935
- Coordinates: 28.16992°N 80.66588°W
- Owner: Eastern Florida State College
- Capacity: 1,000 (standard); 3,500 (Orlando City B matches)
- Surface: Grass

Construction
- Built: 2013

Tenants
- Eastern Florida Titans men's & women's soccer NJCAA Division I Women's Soccer National Championship (2014–2016); Orlando City B (USL) (2016)

The Titan Soccer Complex is a 1,000-seat soccer-specific stadium on the campus of Eastern Florida State College in Melbourne, Florida. Built in 2013, it is currently home to the Eastern Florida Titans men's and women's soccer teams, as well as the host of the NJCAA Division I Women's Soccer National Championship from 2014 until 2016.

In 2016, it was home to Orlando City B, Orlando City SC's affiliate in the United Soccer League. For OCB matches, the stadium's capacity was expanded to 3,500 seats.

Preceded by none	Home of Orlando City B 2016	Succeeded by Orlando City Stadium
