= Kyle Callan-McFadden =

Irish footballer (born 1995)

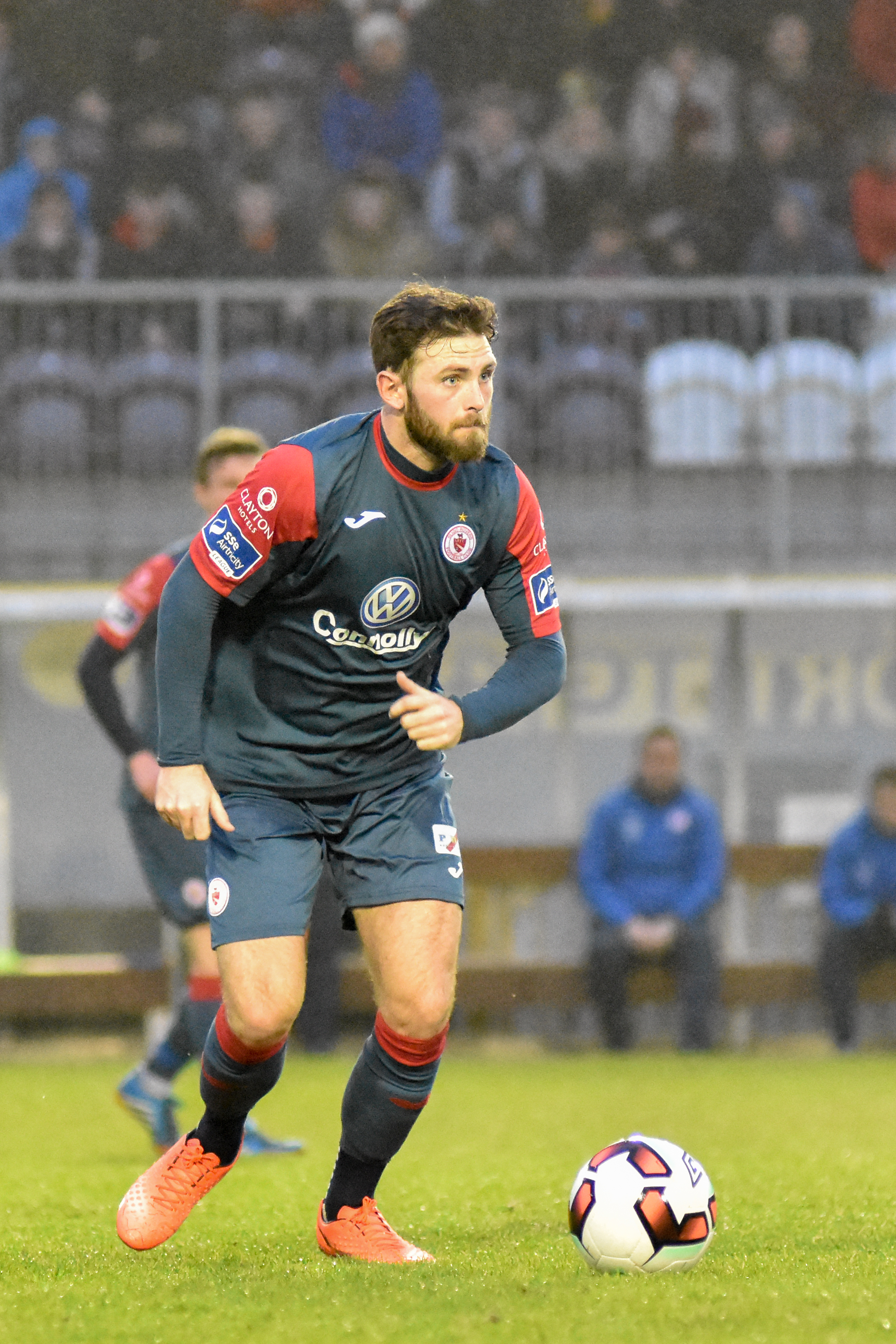
- Kyle Callan-McFadden in 2017

Personal information
- Full name: Kyle Callan-McFadden
- Date of birth: 20 April 1995 (age 31)
- Place of birth: Ramelton, County Donegal, Ireland
- Height: 1.83 m (6 ft 0 in)
- Position: Defender

Team information
- Current team: Leiston

Youth career
- Swilly Rovers
- 2011–2014: Norwich City

Senior career*
Years	Team	Apps	(Gls)
2013–2015	Norwich City	2	(0)
2016	Orlando City B	26	(0)
2016–2020	Sligo Rovers	105	(5)
2020–2025	King's Lynn Town	154	(3)
2025–	Leiston	52	(2)

International career
2012–2013	Republic of Ireland U17	16	(2)
2013–2014	Republic of Ireland U19	13	(0)
2015	Republic of Ireland U21	1	(0)
- * Club domestic league appearances and goals as of 2 August 2025

Kyle Callan-McFadden (born 20 April 1995) is an Irish semi-professional footballer who plays as a centre back for Southern League Premier Division Central side Leiston.

== Career ==
Highly rated as a youngster in his native Ireland Callan-McFadden joined the academy at Norwich City at the age of sixteen after impressing on trial. In 2013, Callan-McFadden won the FA Youth Cup with Norwich, playing 90 minutes in both legs of the final against Chelsea. He made his first team debut for the Canaries on 28 July 2014 in a friendly against OGC Nice. He made his professional debut in Norwich's 3–1 League Cup second round victory against Crawley Town on 26 August 2014, playing the full 90 minutes. However, he was released by Norwich at the end of the 2014–15 season.

On 15 October 2015, Callan-McFadden joined Orlando City B.

On 2 December 2016, Callan-McFadden was signed by Sligo Rovers of the League of Ireland Premier Division.

After the conclusion of the 2020 League of Ireland Premier Division season, Callan-McFadden announced he would be leaving Sligo Rovers and returning to England for family reasons. He signed for King's Lynn Town of the National League.

On 2 August 2025, Callan-McFadden joined Southern League Premier Division Central club Leiston for an undisclosed fee.

== Honours ==
- FAI U16 Player of the Year: 2011
