= Tyler Turner (soccer) =

American soccer player

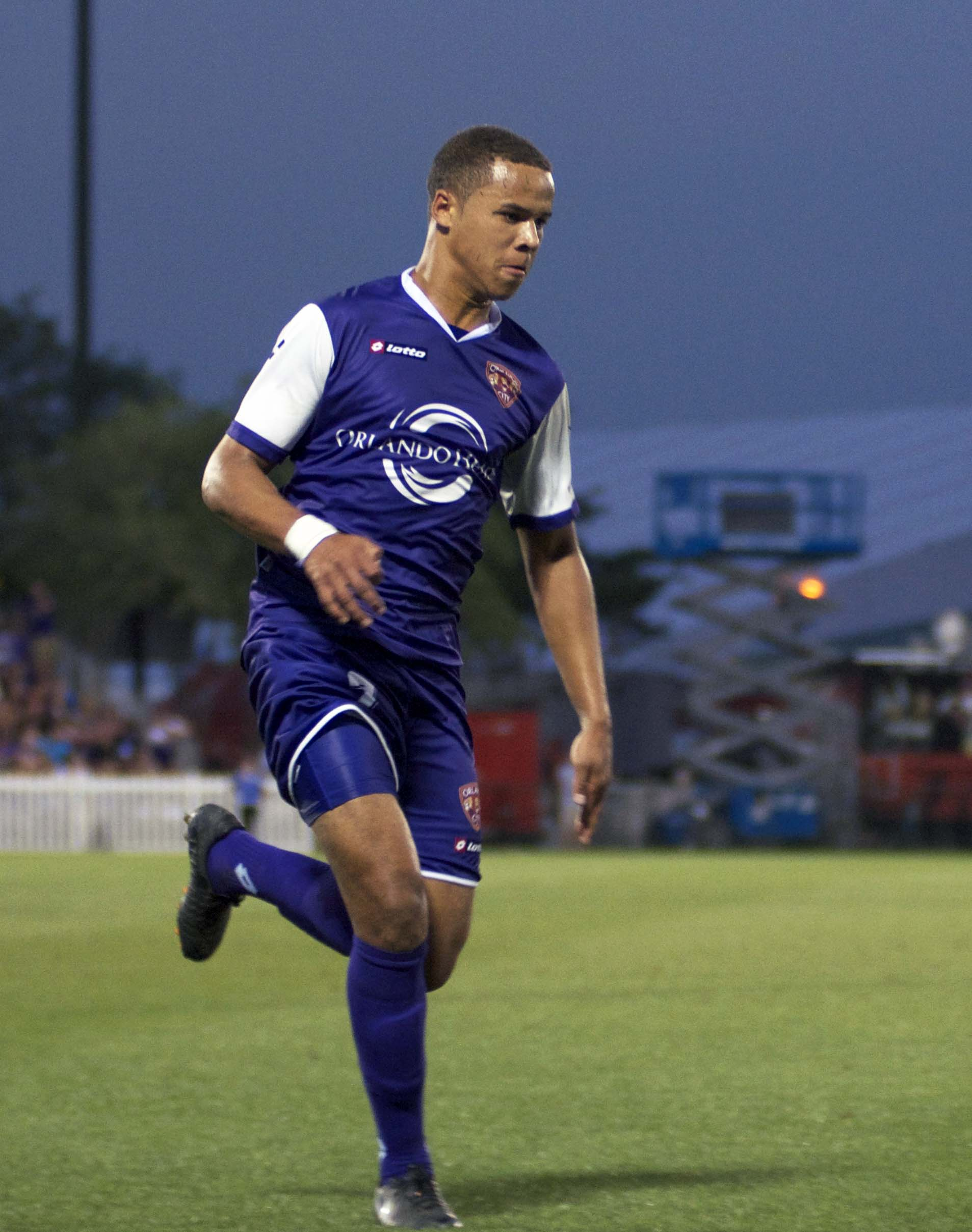

Personal information
- Date of birth: March 4, 1996 (age 30)
- Place of birth: Milford, Connecticut, United States
- Height: 5 ft 11 in (1.80 m)
- Position: Defender

Team information
- Current team: St. Louis Ambush
- Number: 96

Youth career
- 2010–2013: BSC CT Academy
- 2013–2014: IMG Soccer Academy

Senior career*
Years	Team	Apps	(Gls)
2014	Orlando City (USL)	24	(1)
2015–2016	Orlando City	7	(0)
2016	Orlando City B	26	(4)
2017	LA Galaxy II	22	(1)
2018	Elm City Express	1	(0)
2018	Orlando SeaWolves (indoor)	4	(1)
2019	Birmingham Legion	12	(0)
2021–2022	Milwaukee Wave (indoor)	21	(4)
2022–	Iowa Raptors		
2022–	St. Louis Ambush (indoor)	0	(0)

International career^{‡}
2011–2013	United States U17	20	(4)
2013–2014	United States U18	4	(0)
2014–2015	United States U20	5	(0)
2015	United States U23	1	(0)

Managerial career
- 2022–: Iowa Raptors MWPL
- * Club domestic league appearances and goals as of March 26, 2022 ‡ National team caps and goals as of June 7, 2015

Tyler Turner (born March 4, 1996) is an American professional soccer player who plays as a defender for the St. Louis Ambush in the Major Arena Soccer League, and outdoors for Iowa Raptors FC in the United Premier Soccer League. Turner is also the head coach for the Iowa Raptors second team playing the Midwest Premier League.

== Playing career ==
On February 27, 2014, Turner signed both a USL Pro contract and an MLS contract with Orlando City SC, making him the youngest player in club history. He made his professional debut on March 22 in a 1–1 draw with the Charleston Battery. Tyler was selected as the club's Rookie of the Year at the conclusion of the 2014 season.

Turner made his MLS regular season debut on March 28, 2015, in a 2–2 draw against Montreal. He started and played all 90 minutes in the contest.

In July 2015, Turner was selected as a member of the MLS Homegrown Team by former USMNT and LA Galaxy player Landon Donovan who served as coach of the Homegrown team.

He was loaned to Orlando City B in March 2016. He became a free agent on November 23, 2016.

Turner was signed by USL side LA Galaxy II on March 16, 2017. His contract option was declined on December 4, 2017.

For the 2018 season, he was on the roster for NPSL side Elm City Express.

In August 2018, Turner signed for Major Arena Soccer League team Orlando SeaWolves.

On February 20, 2019, Birmingham Legion FC of the USL Championship announced they had signed Turner to a multi-year contract.

Turner returned to the MASL in 2021, signing with the Milwaukee Wave.

In September 2022, Turner signed with the St. Louis Ambush on a three-year contract.

== International ==
He played for the United States men's national under-23 soccer team at the 2015 Toulon Tournament. Turner has previously starred for his native country at several other levels, playing for the U-17s, captaining the U-18s and also featuring for the U-20 national team.

== Coaching ==
On February 1, 2022, Turner was named head coach for the Iowa Raptors FC second team playing in the Midwest Premier League.
