= Bobby Warshaw =

American soccer player

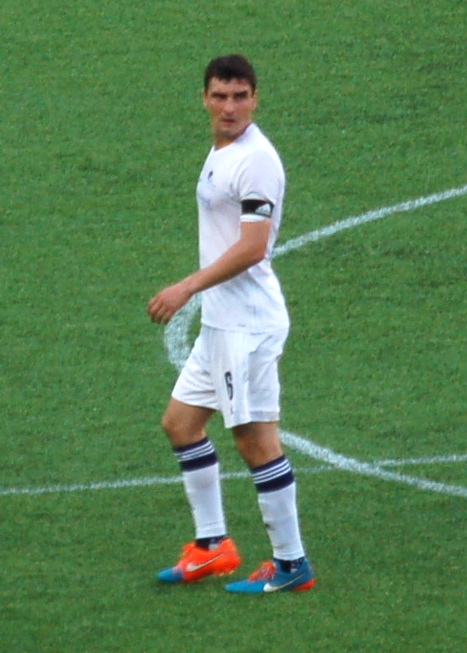
- Warshaw with Harrisburg City Islanders in 2016

Personal information
- Full name: William Robert Warshaw
- Date of birth: November 21, 1988 (age 37)
- Place of birth: Mechanicsburg, Pennsylvania, United States
- Height: 1.85 m (6 ft 1 in)
- Position: Midfielder

College career
Years	Team	Apps	(Gls)
2007–2010	Stanford Cardinal	76	(18)

Senior career*
Years	Team	Apps	(Gls)
2011–2013	FC Dallas	32	(1)
2013	→ Ängelholms FF (loan)	9	(8)
2014	GAIS	16	(2)
2014–2015	Bærum	32	(5)
2015	Hønefoss	10	(1)
2016	Harrisburg City Islanders	28	(4)
Total		127	(21)

International career^{‡}
2005	United States U17	15	(2)
- * Club domestic league appearances and goals as of October 1, 2016 ‡ National team caps and goals as of August 18, 2014

William Robert "Bobby" Warshaw (born November 21, 1988) is an American former professional soccer player. He now works as a writer, analyst, and author.

== Soccer career ==
=== Youth and college ===
Warshaw attended Mechanicsburg Area Senior High School, where he was a Gatorade State Player of the Year twice in 2005 and 2006. He was the Pennsylvania Soccer Coaches Association Player of the Year in 2006 and NSCAA Youth All-America Player of the Year in 2004, 2005 and 2006. He earned a place for the first time in the U-17 national team during the 2005 season. Warshaw has been quoted saying that his high school coach, Tony Lougee, was his main influence in every one of his fundamentals and credits him with much of his life success, stating in one January 2011 interview, "Tony made me the man I am today; he is really a father figure to me."

Warshaw made his college soccer debut at Stanford University in 2007, starting 17 matches and scoring 5 goals. He was chosen captain for the team for the 2008, 2009 and 2010 seasons. In 2009, Warshaw led Stanford to the Round of 16 in the NCAA tournament with wins over Saint Mary's and UC Irvine in the first two rounds, and was a Hermann Trophy (USA College Player of the Year) semi-finalist. He scored 18 goals in his career at Stanford, despite being moved to defense for his final two seasons.

=== Professional ===
Warshaw was selected in the first round (17th overall) by FC Dallas in the 2011 MLS SuperDraft. He made his professional debut on May 7, 2011, coming on as a substitute in a 0–0 tie with D.C. United.

Warshaw was loaned to Swedish Superettan club Ängelholms FF on August 11, 2013. On February 24, 2014, it was announced that Warshaw would join Swedish Superettan club GAIS on a one-year contract.

Warshaw moved to Norwegian First Division club Bærum in August 2014. He signed with First Division side Hønefoss in August 2015.

After a contract fell through with Israeli club Maccabi Netanya, Warshaw signed with United Soccer League team Harrisburg City Islanders in his home state of Pennsylvania for the 2016 season.

=== International ===
Warshaw debuted for the USA U-17 national team in 2005 against Honduras. He scored his first goal for the national team in 2007 against Venezuela in the Pan-American Games held in Rio de Janeiro, Brazil. USA ended up winning the match 2–1, with Warshaw scoring the game-winning goal.

== Personal ==
Warshaw is the son of Allen and Shirley Anne Warshaw, who is a political science professor at Gettysburg College, and also an author and political commentator.

Besides being an athlete, Warshaw also holds a strong academic record with a 3.57 GPA in political science while at Stanford. In 2010, Warshaw was awarded an Academic All-District award. Stanford Cardinal coach Bret Simon described Warshaw as a "true leader and fierce competitor with a proven track record in every season as a Stanford Cardinal".

== Media career ==
During and after his soccer career, Warshaw contributed articles to sites such as Deadspin, FourFourTwo, Fox Soccer, MLSsoccer.com, and The Patriot-News, as well founding and writing for his own website, The Athlete Story. He also appears as an analyst on MLSsoccer.com.

In 2017, Warshaw published a book, When the Dream Became Reality, about his experiences as a soccer player.
