= Devron García =

Honduran footballer (born 1996)

Personal information
- Full name: Devron Kyber García Ducker
- Date of birth: 17 February 1996 (age 30)
- Place of birth: Roatán, Honduras
- Height: 1.90 m (6 ft 3 in)
- Positions: Defender; defensive midfielder

Team information
- Current team: Vida

Senior career*
Years	Team	Apps	(Gls)
2013–2015	C.D. Victoria	39	(3)
2016–2017	Orlando City	0	(0)
2016	→ Orlando City B (loan)	18	(1)
2017–	Real España	84	(2)
2018–	Vida	27	(1)

International career^{‡}
2013–2014	Honduras U17	10	(0)
2015	Honduras U20	2	(0)
2023–	Honduras	1	(0)
- * Club domestic league appearances and goals as of 02:16, 26 January 2022 (UTC) ‡ National team caps and goals as of 25 January 2023

Devron Kyber García Ducker (born 17 February 1996) is a Honduran professional footballer who plays for Real España and the Honduras national team.

== Club career ==
After three seasons with C.D. Victoria in Honduras, García moved to Major League Soccer side Orlando City on January 27, 2016. He was loaned to Orlando's United Soccer League affiliate club Orlando City B on April 15, 2016.

On 10 March 2017, García signed on loan with Real España.
