= Shane Campbell (soccer) =

American soccer player (born 1994)

Personal information
- Date of birth: June 24, 1994 (age 32)
- Place of birth: Lancaster, Pennsylvania, U.S.
- Height: 1.84 m (6 ft 0 in)
- Position: Defender

Team information
- Current team: Lansdowne Bhoys FC
- Number: 25

Youth career
- 2008–2012: FC Delco
- 2010–2012: Philadelphia Union

College career
Years	Team	Apps	(Gls)
2012–2013	Penn State Nittany Lions	31	(2)
2014–2015	Louisville Cardinals	27	(2)

Senior career*
Years	Team	Apps	(Gls)
2011–2012	Philadelphia Union Reserves	8	(0)
2012–2015	Reading United	32	(4)
2016	Harrisburg City Islanders	18	(0)
2017	Pittsburgh Riverhounds	10	(0)
2017–2018	Lansdowne Bhoys FC	39	(5)
- * Club domestic league appearances and goals as of 10:15, 20 October 2017 (UTC)

Shane Campbell (born June 24, 1994) is an American retired soccer player. He played for the Philadelphia Union, Harrisburg City Islanders, Pittsburgh Riverhounds, and Lansdowne Bhoys FC during his 4-year playing career.

Campbell played for Penn State University and the University of Louisville during his collegiate playing days from 2012 to 2015. Campbell was a 2012 and 2013 Big Ten Champion at Penn State.

== Career ==
=== Youth and college ===
Campbell grew up in the Eastern PA region, playing in the FC Delco and Philadelphia Union Academy systems during his youth playing career. He was selected to participate in the 2011 US Soccer Development Academy Select Showcase game where he was then identified to participate in the USMNT U-18 ID Camp in the Fall of 2011.

During his days in the Philadelphia Union Academy, Campbell was selected to represent the Philadelphia Union U-17 Academy Team in the 2011 Generation Adidas Cup where he started all 5 games at Left Back. Campbell was also selected to play against Everton's U23 side during the FIFA summer window in 2011. He was then called up to the Philadelphia Union Reserve team in 2012 where he saw action in 11 games, starting 7 of them. Campbell also played with Reading United of the USL Premier Development League.

=== Professional ===
While playing in the academy system, Campbell was selected by Philadelphia Union Head Coach John Hackworth to play with the MLS side's reserve team. Campbell made his professional debut in a 2–1 loss vs Toronto FC in May 2011. Following a decorated college career, Campbell signed with United Soccer League side Harrisburg City Islanders in March 2016 after participating in preseason with the Philadelphia Union of MLS. After appearing in 18 games for the City Islanders, Campbell was transferred to in-state rivals Pittsburgh Riverhounds in 2016. Following his stint in Pittsburgh, Campbell signed a 2-year contract with Lansdowne Bhoys FC, where he played from 2017 to 2018.
