= List of English football transfers summer 2014 =

This is a list of English football transfers for the 2014 summer transfer window. Only moves featuring at least one Premier League or Championship club are listed.

The summer transfer window began once clubs had concluded their final domestic fixture of the 2013–14 season, but many transfers only officially went through on 1 July because the majority of player contracts finished on 30 June. The window remained open until 23:00 BST on 1 September 2014.

This list also includes transfers featuring at least one Premier League or Championship club which were completed after the end of the winter 2013–14 transfer window and before the end of the 2014 summer window.

Players without a club could join at any time, and clubs below Premier League level could sign players on loan during loan windows. Clubs could be permitted to sign a goalkeeper on an emergency loan if they had no registered goalkeeper available.

== Transfers ==
All players, and clubs without a flag are English. Note that while Cardiff City and Swansea City are affiliated with the Football Association of Wales and thus take the Welsh flag, they play in the English football league system, and so their transfers are included here.

Date	Name	Moving from	Moving to	Fee
1 February 2014	(Spain) Cala	(Spain) Sevilla	(Wales) Cardiff City	Free
1 February 2014	(Canada) Simeon Jackson	(Germany) Eintracht Braunschweig	Millwall	Free
3 February 2014	Jimmy Spencer	Huddersfield Town	Notts County	Free
4 February 2014	Sam Baxter	West Ham United	Gillingham	Free
4 February 2014	Ryan Hall	Leeds United	Milton Keynes Dons	Free
5 February 2014	(Sweden) Markus Holgersson	Unattached	Wigan Athletic	Free
6 February 2014	(France) Elliot Grandin	Crystal Palace	Blackpool	Free
7 February 2014^{[a]}	Hiram Boateng	Crystal Palace	Crawley Town	Loan
7 February 2014^{[a]}	Cameron Dawson	Sheffield Wednesday	Plymouth Argyle	Loan
7 February 2014^{[a]}	Brennan Dickenson	Brighton & Hove Albion	Northampton Town	Loan
7 February 2014^{[a]}	Matthew Dolan	Middlesbrough	Bradford City	Loan
7 February 2014^{[a]}	Shwan Jalal	Bournemouth	Leyton Orient	Loan
7 February 2014^{[a]}	Sullay Kaikai	Crystal Palace	Crawley Town	Loan
7 February 2014^{[a]}	Jacob Murphy	Norwich City	Swindon Town	Loan
7 February 2014^{[a]}	Adedeji Oshilaja	(Wales) Cardiff City	Sheffield Wednesday	Loan
8 February 2014	Ade Azeez	Charlton Athletic	Dagenham & Redbridge	Loan
8 February 2014	(Republic of Ireland) Paul Green	Leeds United	Ipswich Town	Loan
8 February 2014	Jordan Pickford	Sunderland	Carlisle United	Loan
8 February 2014	Daniel Redmond	Wigan Athletic	Carlisle United	Loan
8 February 2014	Luke Varney	Leeds United	Blackburn Rovers	Loan
11 February 2014	John Marquis	Millwall	Northampton Town	Loan
12 February 2014	Gary Gardner	Aston Villa	Sheffield Wednesday	Loan
12 February 2014	Dominic McHale	Unattached	Barnsley	Free
12 February 2014	(Northern Ireland) Josh McQuoid	Bournemouth	Peterborough United	Loan
12 February 2014	(Spain) Tomás Mejías	(Spain) Real Madrid	Middlesbrough	Loan
13 February 2014	(Switzerland) Eldin Jakupović	Hull City	Leyton Orient	Loan
13 February 2014	Ben Nugent	(Wales) Cardiff City	Peterborough United	Loan
14 February 2014	Chuba Akpom	Arsenal	Coventry City	Loan
14 February 2014	(Republic of Ireland) Leon Best	Blackburn Rovers	Sheffield Wednesday	Loan
14 February 2014	Sam Hutchinson	Chelsea	Sheffield Wednesday	Loan
14 February 2014	Ryan Inniss	Crystal Palace	Gillingham	Loan
14 February 2014	(Republic of Ireland) Stephen McPhail	Sheffield Wednesday	(Republic of Ireland) Shamrock Rovers	Free
14 February 2014	(Canada) Michael Petrasso	Queens Park Rangers	Coventry City	Loan
14 February 2014	(Republic of Ireland) Conor Wilkinson	Bolton Wanderers	Torquay United	Loan
15 February 2014	Jordan Bowery	Aston Villa	Doncaster Rovers	Loan
18 February 2014	(Argentina) Federico Bessone	Unattached	Millwall	Free
18 February 2014	Craig Lynch	Sunderland	Rochdale	Free
18 February 2014	(Spain) Rubén Palazuelos	Unattached	Yeovil Town	Free
18 February 2014	Lee Tomlin	Peterborough United	Middlesbrough	Undisclosed
19 February 2014	(Republic of Ireland) Jake Carroll	Huddersfield Town	Bury	Loan
19 February 2014	Ben Davies	Derby County	Sheffield United	Loan
19 February 2014	Ravel Morrison	West Ham United	Queens Park Rangers	Loan
19 February 2014	Curtis Obeng	(Wales) Swansea City	Queens Park Rangers	Loan
20 February 2014	(United States) Duane Holmes	Huddersfield Town	Yeovil Town	Loan
20 February 2014	(Republic of Ireland) Joe Mason	(Wales) Cardiff City	Bolton Wanderers	Loan
21 February 2014	Jack Butland	Stoke City	Leeds United	Loan
21 February 2014	(Republic of Ireland) Michael Drennan	Aston Villa	Portsmouth	Loan
21 February 2014	Jordon Ibe	Liverpool	Birmingham City	Loan
21 February 2014	Sanmi Odelusi	Bolton Wanderers	Milton Keynes Dons	Loan
21 February 2014	Marcus Tudgay	Nottingham Forest	Charlton Athletic	Loan
24 February 2014	(Australia) Lucas Neill	Unattached	Watford	Free
25 February 2014	Larnell Cole	Fulham	Milton Keynes Dons	Loan
25 February 2014	(Philippines) Neil Etheridge	Fulham	Crewe Alexandra	Loan
25 February 2014	Josh Morris	Blackburn Rovers	Fleetwood Town	Loan
25 February 2014	Ryan Tunnicliffe	Fulham	Wigan Athletic	Loan
26 February 2014	Connor Wickham	Sunderland	Leeds United	Loan
27 February 2014	(Republic of Ireland) John Egan	Sunderland	Southend United	Loan
27 February 2014	(Republic of Ireland) Kevin Foley	Wolverhampton Wanderers	Blackpool	Loan
27 February 2014	Jesse Lingard	Manchester United	Brighton & Hove Albion	Loan
27 February 2014	Lee Naylor	Unattached	Derby County	Free
27 February 2014	(Wales) Jonathan Williams	Crystal Palace	Ipswich Town	Loan
28 February 2014	Bobby Grant	Blackpool	Fleetwood Town	Loan
28 February 2014	(Scotland) Alan Hutton	Aston Villa	Bolton Wanderers	Loan
3 March 2014	Connor Ripley	Middlesbrough	(Sweden) Östersund	Loan
3 March 2014	Nathan Tyson	Blackpool	Notts County	Loan
5 March 2014^{[b]}	(Serbia) Nemanja Vidić	Manchester United	(Italy) Internazionale	Free
6 March 2014	(Wales) Kieron Freeman	Derby County	Sheffield United	Loan
7 March 2014	Adam Drury	Leeds United	Bradford City	Loan
7 March 2014	(Republic of Ireland) Sam Foley	Yeovil Town	Shrewsbury Town	Loan
7 March 2014	Michael Keane	Manchester United	Blackburn Rovers	Loan
8 March 2014	Adam Buxton	Wigan Athletic	Accrington Stanley	Loan
8 March 2014	Liam Feeney	Millwall	Blackburn Rovers	Loan
11 March 2014	James Alabi	Stoke City	Scunthorpe United	Loan
11 March 2014	Reece Brown	Watford	Carlisle United	Loan
11 March 2014	James Pearson	Leicester City	Carlisle United	Loan
11 March 2014	(Czech Republic) Jakub Sokolík	Liverpool	Southend United	Loan
13 March 2014	Mason Bennett	Derby County	Chesterfield	Loan
13 March 2014	(Wales) Lloyd Isgrove	Southampton	Peterborough United	Loan
13 March 2014	Jack Stephens	Southampton	Swindon Town	Loan
14 March 2014	(Algeria) Adel Gafaiti	Norwich City	Oldham Athletic	Loan
14 March 2014	(Spain) Cristian López	Huddersfield Town	Northampton Town	Loan
14 March 2014	(Jamaica) Nyron Nosworthy	Watford	Bristol City	Loan
15 March 2014	(Northern Ireland) Martin Paterson	Huddersfield Town	Bristol City	Loan
17 March 2014	(Scotland) Rhys McCabe	Sheffield Wednesday	Portsmouth	Loan
17 March 2014	Jonathan Obika	Tottenham Hotspur	Charlton Athletic	Loan
17 March 2014^{[b]}	Johan Ter Horst	Folkestone Invicta	Hull City	Undisclosed
18 March 2014	(Wales) Jack Collison	West Ham United	Wigan Athletic	Loan
18 March 2014	Dominic Iorfa	Wolverhampton Wanderers	Shrewsbury Town	Loan
18 March 2014	(Wales) James Loveridge	(Wales) Swansea City	Milton Keynes Dons	Loan
20 March 2014	(Northern Ireland) Chris Baird	Unattached	Burnley	Free
21 March 2014	(Wales) Robert Earnshaw	Unattached	Blackpool	Free
21 March 2014	Ryan Edwards	Blackburn Rovers	Morecambe	Loan
21 March 2014	(Jamaica) Jamar Loza	Norwich City	Southend United	Loan
24 March 2014	Alex Henshall	Manchester City	Ipswich Town	Loan
25 March 2014	(United States) Gboly Ariyibi	Leeds United	Tranmere Rovers	Loan
26 March 2014	(Mali) Mahamadou Diarra	Unattached	Fulham	Free
26 March 2014	Nathan Eccleston	Blackpool	Coventry City	Loan
26 March 2014	(Scotland) Matthew Kennedy	Everton	Milton Keynes Dons	Loan
26 March 2014	(Australia) Lucas Neill	Watford	Doncaster Rovers	Loan
27 March 2014	Kwesi Appiah	Crystal Palace	AFC Wimbledon	Loan
27 March 2014	(Ivory Coast) Anderson Banvo	Blackpool	Stevenage	Loan
27 March 2014	(Northern Ireland) Ryan Brobbel	Middlesbrough	York City	Loan
27 March 2014	Baily Cargill	Bournemouth	Torquay United	Loan
27 March 2014	Shaq Coulthirst	Tottenham Hotspur	Torquay United	Loan
27 March 2014	Lucas Dawson	Stoke City	Carlisle United	Loan
27 March 2014	(Trinidad and Tobago) Carlos Edwards	Ipswich Town	Millwall	Loan
27 March 2014	(Wales) Gwion Edwards	(Wales) Swansea City	Crawley Town	Loan
27 March 2014	Liam Grimshaw	Manchester United	Morecambe	Loan
27 March 2014	Scott Harrison	Sunderland	Hartlepool United	Loan
27 March 2014	(Republic of Ireland) Conor Henderson	Hull City	Stevenage	Loan
27 March 2014	Danny Hollands	Charlton Athletic	Portsmouth	Loan
27 March 2014	Hallam Hope	Everton	Bury	Loan
27 March 2014	John Lundstram	Everton	Leyton Orient	Loan
27 March 2014	Gary Madine	Sheffield Wednesday	Carlisle United	Loan
27 March 2014	John Marquis	Millwall	Northampton Town	Loan
27 March 2014	Jeffrey Monakana	Brighton & Hove Albion	Crawley Town	Loan
27 March 2014	Jacob Murphy	Norwich City	Southend United	Loan
27 March 2014	Jordan Mustoe	Wigan Athletic	Morecambe	Loan
27 March 2014	Connor Oliver	Sunderland	Hartlepool United	Loan
27 March 2014	Lee Peltier	Leeds United	Nottingham Forest	Loan
27 March 2014	Matthew Pennington	Everton	Tranmere Rovers	Loan
27 March 2014	(Italy) Davide Petrucci	Manchester United	Charlton Athletic	Loan
27 March 2014	David Prutton	Sheffield Wednesday	Coventry City	Loan
27 March 2014	(Spain) Albert Riera	Unattached	Watford	Free
27 March 2014	Andy Robinson	Southampton	Bolton Wanderers	Loan
27 March 2014	Danny Rose	Barnsley	Bury	Loan
27 March 2014	Jon Stead	Huddersfield Town	Bradford City	Loan
27 March 2014	Tom Thorpe	Manchester United	Birmingham City	Loan
27 March 2014	(Greece) Apostolos Vellios	Everton	Blackpool	Loan
27 March 2014	Alex Wynter	Crystal Palace	Colchester United	Loan
4 April 2014	Martyn Waghorn	Leicester City	Wigan Athletic	Free
11 April 2014	(Wales) Lewis Price	Crystal Palace	Mansfield Town	Loan
20 April 2014^{[b]}	(Wales) David Vaughan	Sunderland	Nottingham Forest	Free
28 April 2014^{[b]}	Neil Danns	Leicester City	Bolton Wanderers	Free
3 May 2014	Danny Mayor	Sheffield Wednesday	Bury	Undisclosed
9 May 2014	(Scotland) Danny Fox	Southampton	Nottingham Forest	Free
12 May 2014^{[b]}	Liam Trotter	Millwall	Bolton Wanderers	Free
13 May 2014	Kurtis Cumberbatch	Watford	Charlton Athletic	Free
16 May 2014^{[b]}	Matthew Dolan	Middlesbrough	Bradford City	Free
16 May 2014^{[b]}	Dan Gosling	Newcastle United	Bournemouth	Free
17 May 2014 (Note: Player will officially join his club at the end of the 2014-15 season.)	(Serbia) Vanja Milinković-Savić	(Serbia) Vojvodina	Manchester United	Undisclosed
17 May 2014	Tom Leggett	Southampton	Aston Villa	Free
17 May 2014	Isaac Nehemie	Southampton	Aston Villa	Free
19 May 2014^{[b]}	Liam Feeney	Millwall	Bolton Wanderers	Free
19 May 2014	(Bosnia and Herzegovina) Armin Hodžić	Liverpool	(Croatia) Dinamo Zagreb	Free
20 May 2014	Ryan Edwards	Blackburn Rovers	Morecambe	Free
20 May 2014^{[b]}	Craig Gardner	Sunderland	West Bromwich Albion	Free
20 May 2014^{[b]}	(Democratic Republic of the Congo) Nzuzi Toko	(Switzerland) Grasshopper	Brighton & Hove Albion	Free
21 May 2014	(Trinidad and Tobago) Carlos Edwards	Ipswich Town	Millwall	Free
21 May 2014^{[b]}	(Spain) Javi Guerra	(Spain) Valladolid	(Wales) Cardiff City	Free
21 May 2014	Taylor McKenzie	Sheffield Wednesday	Notts County	Free
21 May 2014^{[b]}	Andy Robinson	Southampton	Bolton Wanderers	Free
22 May 2014^{[b]}	(Scotland) Phil Bardsley	Sunderland	Stoke City	Free
22 May 2014	Ben Hamer	Charlton Athletic	Leicester City	Free
22 May 2014	Danny Hollands	Charlton Athletic	Portsmouth	Free
22 May 2014^{[b]}	(Czech Republic) Marek Štěch	Yeovil Town	(Czech Republic) Sparta Prague	Free
23 May 2014	Marc Albrighton	Aston Villa	Leicester City	Free
23 May 2014^{[b]}	Jack Barmby	Manchester United	Leicester City	Free
23 May 2014	(Austria) Guido Burgstaller	(Austria) Rapid Wien	(Wales) Cardiff City	Undisclosed
23 May 2014	Danny Green	Charlton Athletic	Milton Keynes Dons	Free
23 May 2014	Conor Newton	Newcastle United	Rotherham United	Free
23 May 2014^{[b]}	Matthew Upson	Brighton & Hove Albion	Leicester City	Free
24 May 2014^{[b]}	(Brazil) Heurelho Gomes	Tottenham Hotspur	Watford	Free
27 May 2014^{[b]}	(France) Dorian Dervite	Charlton Athletic	Bolton Wanderers	Free
27 May 2014^{[b]}	Shay Logan	Brentford	(Scotland) Aberdeen	Free
27 May 2014^{[b]}	(Italy) Federico Macheda	Manchester United	(Wales) Cardiff City	Free
27 May 2014	(Romania) Gabriel Tamaș	Unattached	Watford	Free
28 May 2014^{[b]}	Billy Jones	West Bromwich Albion	Sunderland	Free
28 May 2014	Adam Le Fondre	Reading	(Wales) Cardiff City	Undisclosed
28 May 2014	(Argentina) Mauro Zárate	(Argentina) Vélez Sarsfield	West Ham United	Undisclosed
29 May 2014^{[b]}	(Poland) Łukasz Fabiański	Arsenal	(Wales) Swansea City	Free
29 May 2014^{[b]}	(Spain) Jordi Gómez	Wigan Athletic	Sunderland	Free
30 May 2014	Matt Derbyshire	Nottingham Forest	Rotherham United	Free
30 May 2014	(Republic of Ireland) Kevin Feely	Charlton Athletic	(Wales) Newport County	Free
30 May 2014^{[b]}	Billy Knott	Sunderland	Bradford City	Free
30 May 2014	George Taft	Leicester City	Burton Albion	Free
2 June 2014^{[b]}	Jonathan Grounds	Oldham Athletic	Birmingham City	Free
2 June 2014	(Republic of Ireland) Alan Judge	Blackburn Rovers	Brentford	Undisclosed
2 June 2014	Rickie Lambert	Southampton	Liverpool	£4m
3 June 2014	(Ghana) Derek Boateng	Fulham	(Spain) Rayo Vallecano	Free
3 June 2014^{[b]}	Tommy Rowe	Peterborough United	Wolverhampton Wanderers	Free
3 June 2014	Ed Sanders	Stoke City	Sheffield Wednesday	Free
3 June 2014	Andrew Taylor	(Wales) Cardiff City	Wigan Athletic	Free
3 June 2014	Matt Young	Southampton	Sheffield Wednesday	Free
4 June 2014^{[b]}	Aaron Martin	Birmingham City	Yeovil Town	Free
4 June 2014	Joseph Mills	Burnley	Oldham Athletic	Free
4 June 2014^{[b]}	Jonathan Mitchell	Newcastle United	Derby County	Free
4 June 2014	(Scotland) Aaron Taylor-Sinclair	(Scotland) Partick Thistle	Wigan Athletic	Free
5 June 2014^{[b]}	Chris Basham	Blackpool	Sheffield United	Free
5 June 2014	Lewis Grabban	Bournemouth	Norwich City	Undisclosed
5 June 2014	Mark Halstead	Blackpool	Shrewsbury Town	Free
5 June 2014	Scott Loach	Ipswich Town	Rotherham United	Free
5 June 2014^{[b]}	(Switzerland) Philippe Senderos	(Spain) Valencia	Aston Villa	Free
6 June 2014	Zak Ansah	Arsenal	Charlton Athletic	Free
6 June 2014	(Spain) Ayoze	(Spain) Tenerife	Newcastle United	Undisclosed
6 June 2014	Grant Hall	Tottenham Hotspur	Birmingham City	Loan
7 June 2014	(Israel) Yossi Benayoun	Queens Park Rangers	(Israel) Maccabi Haifa	Free
9 June 2014	(Scotland) Kirk Broadfoot	Blackpool	Rotherham United	Free
9 June 2014	Jack Colback	Sunderland	Newcastle United	Free
9 June 2014	Ben Davies	Derby County	Sheffield United	Free
9 June 2014^{[b]}	Matty Fryatt	Hull City	Nottingham Forest	Free
9 June 2014	(Republic of Ireland) Stephen Gleeson	Milton Keynes Dons	Birmingham City	Free
9 June 2014^{[b]}	Steve Sidwell	Fulham	Stoke City	Free
9 June 2014^{[b]}	Calum Woods	Huddersfield Town	Preston North End	Free
10 June 2014	Jordan Bowery	Aston Villa	Rotherham United	Undisclosed
10 June 2014	Alban Bunjaku	(Spain) Sevilla	Derby County	Free
10 June 2014	Joe Cole	West Ham United	Aston Villa	Free
10 June 2014	(Republic of Ireland) Damien Duff	Fulham	(Australia) Melbourne City	Free
10 June 2014	(Netherlands) Rajiv van La Parra	(Netherlands) Heerenveen	Wolverhampton Wanderers	Free
11 June 2014^{[b]}	(Senegal) Mame Biram Diouf	(Germany) Hannover 96	Stoke City	Free
11 June 2014^{[b]}	(Czech Republic) Tomáš Kalas	Chelsea	(Germany) 1. FC Köln	Loan
11 June 2014	(Slovakia) Dionatan Teixeira	(Slovakia) Dukla Banská Bystrica	Stoke City	Undisclosed
11 June 2014	Wes Thomas	Unattached	Birmingham City	Free
12 June 2014	(South Africa) Kagisho Dikgacoi	Crystal Palace	(Wales) Cardiff City	Free
12 June 2014^{[b]}	Lloyd Dyer	Leicester City	Watford	Free
12 June 2014	(Canada) David Edgar	Burnley	Birmingham City	Free
12 June 2014	(Spain) Cesc Fàbregas	(Spain) Barcelona	Chelsea	£30m
12 June 2014^{[b]}	(Republic of Ireland) Gavin Gunning	(Scotland) Dundee United	Birmingham City	Free
12 June 2014	(Netherlands) Lars Veldwijk	(Netherlands) Excelsior	Nottingham Forest	Undisclosed
13 June 2014	Adam Davies	Sheffield Wednesday	Barnsley	Free
13 June 2014	(Brazil) David Luiz	Chelsea	(France) Paris Saint-Germain	£50m
13 June 2014	(France) Bacary Sagna	Unattached	Manchester City	Free
16 June 2014	Shaun Hutchinson	(Scotland) Motherwell	Fulham	Free
16 June 2014	(Romania) Costel Pantilimon	Manchester City	Sunderland	Free
16 June 2014	Matt Tubbs	Bournemouth	AFC Wimbledon	Loan
17 June 2014	Lee Gregory	FC Halifax Town	Millwall	Undisclosed
17 June 2014	(Republic of Ireland) Joe Murphy	Unattached	Huddersfield Town	Free
17 June 2014	(Wales) Josh Pritchard	Fulham	Gillingham	Free
17 June 2014	Mat Sadler	Crawley Town	Rotherham United	Free
18 June 2014^{[b]}	Mark Duffy	Doncaster Rovers	Birmingham City	Free
18 June 2014	(Senegal) Cheikhou Kouyaté	(Belgium) Anderlecht	West Ham United	Undisclosed
19 June 2014	Neal Bishop	Blackpool	Scunthorpe United	Free
19 June 2014	(Scotland) Chris Kettings	Blackpool	Crystal Palace	Free
20 June 2014	Louis Laing	Sunderland	Nottingham Forest	Free
20 June 2014	Joleon Lescott	Manchester City	West Bromwich Albion	Free
21 June 2014	(Belgium) Yoni Buyens	(Belgium) Standard Liège	Charlton Athletic	Loan
23 June 2014	Chris Brown	Doncaster Rovers	Blackburn Rovers	Free
23 June 2014	(Portugal) Daniel Carriço	Reading	(Spain) Sevilla	Undisclosed
23 June 2014	Lee Peltier	Unattached	Huddersfield Town	Free
24 June 2014	(Northern Ireland) Craig Cathcart	Unattached	Watford	Free
24 June 2014	(Wales) David Cotterill	Unattached	Birmingham City	Free
24 June 2014^{[b]}	(Northern Ireland) Paul McElroy	Hull City	Sheffield Wednesday	Free
24 June 2014	(Australia) Adam Taggart	(Australia) Newcastle Jets	Fulham	Undisclosed
24 June 2014	(Angola) Igor Vetokele	(Denmark) Copenhagen	Charlton Athletic	Undisclosed
24 June 2014^{[b]}	Byron Webster	Yeovil Town	Millwall	Free
25 June 2014^{[b]}	Clayton Donaldson	Brentford	Birmingham City	Free
25 June 2014	(Germany) Tim Hoogland	(Germany) FC Schalke 04	Fulham	Free
25 June 2014	Jake Livermore	Tottenham Hotspur	Hull City	£8m
25 June 2014	Liam Ridgewell	West Bromwich Albion	(United States) Portland Timbers	Free
25 June 2014	(Spain) Marcos Tébar	Unattached	Brentford	Free
26 June 2014	(Spain) Luis Alberto	Liverpool	(Spain) Málaga	Loan
26 June 2014	Ade Azeez	Charlton Athletic	AFC Wimbledon	Free
26 June 2014	(Brazil) Fernando	(Portugal) Porto	Manchester City	£12m
26 June 2014	Ryan Hall	Unattached	Rotherham United	Free
26 June 2014	(Republic of Ireland) Conor Henderson	Hull City	Crawley Town	Free
26 June 2014	(Spain) Ander Herrera	(Spain) Athletic Bilbao	Manchester United	£29m
26 June 2014	(Germany) Sascha Riether	Fulham	(Germany) SC Freiburg	Undisclosed
26 June 2014	Junior Stanislas	Burnley	Bournemouth	Free
26 June 2014	(Czech Republic) Matěj Vydra	(Italy) Udinese	Watford	Loan
26 June 2014	Richard Wood	Unattached	Rotherham United	Free
27 June 2014	Febian Brandy	Sheffield United	Rotherham United	Free
27 June 2014	(France) Bafétimbi Gomis	Unattached	(Wales) Swansea City	Free
27 June 2014	Andre Gray	Luton Town	Brentford	Undisclosed
27 June 2014	Alex Henshall	Manchester City	Ipswich Town	Free
27 June 2014	Michael Kightly	Stoke City	Burnley	Undisclosed
27 June 2014^{[b]}	(Northern Ireland) Kyle Lafferty	(Italy) Palermo	Norwich City	Undisclosed
27 June 2014	Moses Odubajo	Leyton Orient	Brentford	£1m
27 June 2014	Frazer Richardson	Unattached	Rotherham United	Free
27 June 2014	Luke Shaw	Southampton	Manchester United	£30m
27 June 2014	(United States) Zak Whitbread	Leicester City	Derby County	Free
28 June 2014	(Netherlands) Alexander Büttner	Manchester United	(Russia) Dynamo Moscow	£4.4m (Note: Rising to £5.6m.)
28 June 2014	(Spain) Oriol Riera	(Spain) Osasuna	Wigan Athletic	Undisclosed
28 June 2014	James Tavernier	Newcastle United	Wigan Athletic	Undisclosed
30 June 2014	(Republic of Ireland) Paul Green	Unattached	Rotherham United	Free
30 June 2014	(Scotland) Stephen Kingsley	(Scotland) Falkirk	(Wales) Swansea City	Undisclosed
30 June 2014	(Scotland) Robert Snodgrass	Norwich City	Hull City	Undisclosed (Note: Believed to be more than £6m.)
30 June 2014	(Czech Republic) Jakub Sokolík	Liverpool	Yeovil Town	Free
30 June 2014	(Brazil) Wallace	Chelsea	(Netherlands) Vitesse Arnhem	Loan
1 July 2014	(Netherlands) Siem de Jong	(Netherlands) Ajax	Newcastle United	Undisclosed
1 July 2014	Adam Lallana	Southampton	Liverpool	£25m
1 July 2014	(Brazil) Alefe Santos	Bristol Rovers	Derby County	Compensation
1 July 2014	Cameron Stewart	Unattached	Ipswich Town	Free
1 July 2014	Luke Varney	Unattached	Blackburn Rovers	Free
2 July 2014	(Wales) Daniel Alfei	(Wales) Swansea City	Northampton Town	Loan
2 July 2014	(Netherlands) Marvin Emnes	Middlesbrough	(Wales) Swansea City	Undisclosed
2 July 2014	(Scotland) Matt Gilks	Unattached	Burnley	Free
2 July 2014	(Belgium) Franck Moussa	Unattached	Charlton Athletic	Free
2 July 2014	Dean Moxey	Unattached	Bolton Wanderers	Free
2 July 2014	(Switzerland) Kay Voser	(Switzerland) Basel	Fulham	Undisclosed
3 July 2014	(Germany) Emre Can	(Germany) Bayer Leverkusen	Liverpool	£10m
3 July 2014	Aaron Cresswell	Ipswich Town	West Ham United	Undisclosed
3 July 2014	Luke Norris	Brentford	Gillingham	Compensation
3 July 2014	Stuart Taylor	Unattached	Leeds United	Free
4 July 2014	Ryan Allsop	Bournemouth	Coventry City	Loan
4 July 2014	(Senegal) Mohamed Coulibaly	Bournemouth	Coventry City	Loan
4 July 2014	(Spain) Tomás Mejías	(Spain) Real Madrid	Middlesbrough	Undisclosed
4 July 2014	Marvin Sordell	Bolton Wanderers	Burnley	Undisclosed
4 July 2014	Matthew Taylor	Unattached	Burnley	Free
4 July 2014	Callum Wilson	Coventry City	Bournemouth	Undisclosed
4 July 2014	(Estonia) Sergei Zenjov	(Ukraine) Karpaty Lviv	Blackpool	Free
5 July 2014	(Scotland) Paul Gallagher	Leicester City	Preston North End	Loan
5 July 2014	(Belgium) Thorgan Hazard	Chelsea	(Germany) Borussia Mönchengladbach	Loan
7 July 2014	(Northern Ireland) Chris Baird	Unattached	West Bromwich Albion	Free
7 July 2014	Tom Ince	Blackpool	Hull City	Compensation
7 July 2014	(Norway) Jonathan Parr	Unattached	Ipswich Town	Free
7 July 2014	(Republic of Ireland) Steven Reid	Unattached	Burnley	Free
7 July 2014	(Hungary) Dániel Tőzsér	(Italy) Parma	Watford	Loan
7 July 2014	(Republic of Ireland) Keiren Westwood	Unattached	Sheffield Wednesday	Free
7 July 2014	Alex Wynter	Crystal Palace	Portsmouth	Loan
8 July 2014	Gareth Barry	Manchester City	Everton	£2m
8 July 2014	(Argentina) Willy Caballero	(Spain) Málaga	Manchester City	£4.4m (Note: Rising to £6m.)
8 July 2014	Sam Hutchinson	Unattached	Sheffield Wednesday	Free
8 July 2014	(Scotland) Ross McCormack	Leeds United	Fulham	£11m
8 July 2014	Matt Partridge	Reading	Dagenham & Redbridge	Free
8 July 2014	Diego Poyet	Charlton Athletic	West Ham United	Compensation
8 July 2014	(Serbia) Dušan Tadić	(Netherlands) Twente	Southampton	£10.9m
8 July 2014	(Burkina Faso) Bertrand Traoré	Chelsea	(Netherlands) Vitesse Arnhem	Loan
9 July 2014	Amari'i Bell	Birmingham City	Mansfield Town	Loan
9 July 2014	(Cameroon) André Bikey	Unattached	Charlton Athletic	Free
9 July 2014	(Denmark) Nicklas Helenius	Aston Villa	(Denmark) AaB	Loan
9 July 2014	(Switzerland) Pajtim Kasami	Fulham	(Greece) Olympiacos	Undisclosed
9 July 2014	(Croatia) Mario Pašalić	(Croatia) Hajduk Split	Chelsea	Undisclosed
9 July 2014	(Italy) Marco Silvestri	(Italy) Chievo Verona	Leeds United	Undisclosed
9 July 2014	(Greece) Kostas Stafylidis	(Germany) Bayer Leverkusen	Fulham	Loan
10 July 2014	Kwesi Appiah	Crystal Palace	Cambridge United	Loan
10 July 2014	Cyrus Christie	Coventry City	Derby County	Undisclosed
10 July 2014	(Scotland) Don Cowie	Unattached	Wigan Athletic	Free
10 July 2014	Josh Morris	Blackburn Rovers	Fleetwood Town	Loan
10 July 2014	(Chile) Alexis Sánchez	(Spain) Barcelona	Arsenal	£35m
11 July 2014	Alex Baptiste	Bolton Wanderers	Blackburn Rovers	Loan
11 July 2014	(Israel) Tal Ben Haim	(Belgium) Standard Liège	Charlton Athletic	Free
11 July 2014	(Iceland) Jóhann Berg Guðmundsson	(Netherlands) AZ	Charlton Athletic	Free
11 July 2014	(Wales) Gwion Edwards	(Wales) Swansea City	Crawley Town	Undisclosed
11 July 2014	Ben Nugent	(Wales) Cardiff City	Yeovil Town	Loan
11 July 2014	Kieran Richardson	Fulham	Aston Villa	Undisclosed
12 July 2014	(Italy) Graziano Pellè	(Netherlands) Feyenoord	Southampton	Undisclosed
12 July 2014	(Belgium) Sébastien Pocognoli	(Germany) Hannover 96	West Bromwich Albion	Undisclosed
13 July 2014	(Italy) Tommaso Bianchi	(Italy) Sassuolo	Leeds United	Undisclosed
13 July 2014	(France) Rémy Cabella	(France) Montpellier	Newcastle United	Undisclosed
13 July 2014	(Senegal) Souleymane Doukara	(Italy) Catania	Leeds United	Loan
14 July 2014	(Northern Ireland) Aaron Hughes	Unattached	Brightion & Hove Albion	Free
14 July 2014	(Mali) Yacouba Sylla	Aston Villa	(Turkey) Erciyesspor	Loan
15 July 2014	(Poland) Bartosz Białkowski	Notts County	Ipswich Town	Undisclosed
15 July 2014	(Spain) Diego Costa	(Spain) Atlético Madrid	Chelsea	£32m
15 July 2014	Lukas Jutkiewicz	Middlesbrough	Burnley	£1.5m
15 July 2014	(Spain) Kike	(Spain) Real Murcia	Middlesbrough	Undisclosed
15 July 2014	(Serbia) Lazar Marković	(Portugal) Benfica	Liverpool	£20m
15 July 2014	(Spain) Roger Riera	Unattached	Nottingham Forest	Free
15 July 2014	(Romania) George Țucudean	(Belgium) Standard Liège	Charlton Athletic	Free
16 July 2014	(Jamaica) Ricardo Fuller	Unattached	Millwall	Free
16 July 2014	Michael Mancienne	(Germany) Hamburger SV	Nottingham Forest	£1m
16 July 2014	(Scotland) Kevin McNaughton	(Wales) Cardiff City	Bolton Wanderers	Loan
16 July 2014	(France) Emmanuel Rivière	(France) Monaco	Newcastle United	Undisclosed
16 July 2014	(Uruguay) Luis Suárez	Liverpool	(Spain) Barcelona	£75m
17 July 2014	(France) Mathieu Debuchy	Newcastle United	Arsenal	Undisclosed
17 July 2014	Rio Ferdinand	Unattached	Queens Park Rangers	Free
17 July 2014	(Netherlands) Daryl Janmaat	(Netherlands) Feyenoord	Newcastle United	Undisclosed
17 July 2014	(Spain) Michu	(Wales) Swansea City	(Italy) Napoli	Loan
17 July 2014	(Ecuador) Juan Carlos Paredes	(Spain) Granada	Watford	Undisclosed
17 July 2014	Alex Pritchard	Tottenham Hotspur	Brentford	Loan
17 July 2014	(Ecuador) Enner Valencia	(Mexico) Pachuca	West Ham United	£12m
18 July 2014	(Senegal) Demba Ba	Chelsea	(Turkey) Beşiktaş	£4.7m
18 July 2014	(Spain) Iván Calero	(Spain) Atlético Madrid	Derby County	Free
18 July 2014	(Italy) Marco Davide Faraoni	Watford	(Italy) Udinese	Undisclosed
18 July 2014	(Northern Ireland) Will Grigg	Brentford	Milton Keynes Dons	Loan
18 July 2014	(Nigeria) Brown Ideye	(Ukraine) Dynamo Kyiv	West Bromwich Albion	£10m
18 July 2014	Zeli Ismail	Wolverhampton Wanderers	Notts County	Loan
18 July 2014	(Brazil) Filipe Luís	(Spain) Atlético Madrid	Chelsea	£15.8m
18 July 2014	Harrison McGahey	Blackpool	Sheffield United	Compensation
18 July 2014	Louis Rowley	Manchester United	Leicester City	Free
18 July 2014	(Switzerland) Raphael Spiegel	West Ham United	Crawley Town	Loan
19 July 2014	(Switzerland) Gaetano Berardi	(Italy) Sampdoria	Leeds United	Undisclosed
19 July 2014	Chris O'Grady	Barnsley	Brighton & Hove Albion	Undisclosed
19 July 2014	George Thorne	West Bromwich Albion	Derby County	Undisclosed
21 July 2014	(Spain) Iago Aspas	Liverpool	(Spain) Sevilla	Loan
21 July 2014	(France) Patrice Evra	Manchester United	(Italy) Juventus	£1.2m
21 July 2014	(Republic of Ireland) Stephen Henderson	Unattached	Charlton Athletic	Free
21 July 2014	Scott Hogan	Rochdale	Brentford	Undisclosed
21 July 2014	Jeffrey Monakana	Brighton & Hove Albion	(Scotland) Aberdeen	Loan
21 July 2014	Jordan Pickford	Sunderland	Bradford City	Loan
22 July 2014	James Bailey	Derby County	Barnsley	Free
22 July 2014	(Spain) José Campaña	Crystal Palace	(Italy) Sampdoria	Undisclosed
22 July 2014	Steven Caulker	(Wales) Cardiff City	Queens Park Rangers	Undisclosed
22 July 2014	Andrew Hughes	Unattached	Bolton Wanderers	Free
22 July 2014	Jack Hunt	Crystal Palace	Nottingham Forest	Loan
22 July 2014	(Wales) Emyr Huws	Manchester City	Wigan Athletic	Loan
22 July 2014	(Spain) Bojan	(Spain) Barcelona	Stoke City	Undisclosed
22 July 2014	(France) Sylvain Marveaux	Newcastle United	(France) Guingamp	Loan
22 July 2014	(Croatia) Mario Pašalić	Chelsea	(Spain) Elche	Loan
22 July 2014	(Argentina) Leonardo Ulloa	Brighton & Hove Albion	Leicester City	£8m
22 July 2014	Andre Wisdom	Liverpool	West Bromwich Albion	Loan
23 July 2014	(Morocco) Adil Chihi	Unattached	Fulham	Free
23 July 2014	(Wales) Ben Davies	(Wales) Swansea City	Tottenham Hotspur	Undisclosed
23 July 2014	(Germany) Thomas Eisfeld	Arsenal	Fulham	Undisclosed
23 July 2014	Josh Lelan	Derby County	Swindon Town	Loan
23 July 2014	Harry Lennon	Charlton Athletic	Cambridge United	Loan
23 July 2014	(Iceland) Gylfi Sigurðsson	Tottenham Hotspur	(Wales) Swansea City	Undisclosed
23 July 2014	(Netherlands) Michel Vorm	(Wales) Swansea City	Tottenham Hotspur	Undisclosed
24 July 2014	(Republic of Ireland) Keith Andrews	Bolton Wanderers	Watford	Loan
24 July 2014	Fraizer Campbell	(Wales) Cardiff City	Crystal Palace	£900,000
24 July 2014	(Republic of Ireland) Kenny McEvoy	Tottenham Hotspur	Peterborough United	Loan
24 July 2014	(Ecuador) Jefferson Montero	(Mexico) Monarcas Morelia	(Wales) Swansea City	Undisclosed
24 July 2014	(Spain) Alejandro Pozuelo	(Wales) Swansea City	(Spain) Rayo Vallecano	Undisclosed
24 July 2014	(Argentina) Ignacio Scocco	Sunderland	(Argentina) Newell's Old Boys	£2.1m
25 July 2014	(Ghana) Koby Arthur	Birmingham City	Cheltenham Town	Loan
25 July 2014	(Portugal) Bebé	Manchester United	(Portugal) Benfica	£2.4m
25 July 2014	(Wales) Jake Cassidy	Wolverhampton Wanderers	Notts County	Loan
25 July 2014	(Ivory Coast) Didier Drogba	Unattached	Chelsea	Free
25 July 2014	(Netherlands) Patrick van Aanholt	Chelsea	Sunderland	Undisclosed
27 July 2014	(Croatia) Dejan Lovren	Southampton	Liverpool	£20m
27 July 2014	(Colombia) David Ospina	(France) Nice	Arsenal	£3m
28 July 2014	(Norway) Jo Inge Berget	(Wales) Cardiff City	(Scotland) Celtic	Loan
28 July 2014	(Bosnia and Herzegovina) Muhamed Bešić	(Hungary) Ferencváros	Everton	Undisclosed
28 July 2014	Calum Chambers	Southampton	Arsenal	£11m (Note: Rising to £16m.)
28 July 2014	Peter Clarke	Unattached	Blackpool	Free
28 July 2014	(Poland) Tomasz Cywka	Unattached	Blackpool	Free
28 July 2014	(Spain) Esteban Granero	Queens Park Rangers	(Spain) Real Sociedad	Undisclosed
28 July 2014	Kortney Hause	Wolverhampton Wanderers	Gillingham	Loan
28 July 2014	Jacob Mellis	Unattached	Blackpool	Free
28 July 2014	(Iran) Navid Nasseri	Bury	Birmingham City	Free
28 July 2014	Mark Oxley	Hull City	(Scotland) Hibernian	Loan
28 July 2014	Joe Riley	Bolton Wanderers	Oxford United	Loan
28 July 2014	David Stockdale	Fulham	Brighton & Hove Albion	Undisclosed
28 July 2014	Quade Taylor	Unattached	Bolton Wanderers	Free
29 July 2014	(Scotland) Chris Burke	Unattached	Nottingham Forest	Free
29 July 2014	(Iran) Ashkan Dejagah	Fulham	(Qatar) Al-Arabi	Undisclosed
29 July 2014	Nathan Delfouneso	Unattached	Blackpool	Free
29 July 2014	(Nigeria) Odion Ighalo	(Italy) Udinese	Watford	Loan
29 July 2014	Harry Maguire	Sheffield United	Hull City	£2.5m
29 July 2014	(Poland) Radosław Majewski	Nottingham Forest	Huddersfield Town	Loan
29 July 2014	(Belgium) Divock Origi	(France) Lille	Liverpool	£10m
29 July 2014	(Belgium) Divock Origi	Liverpool	(France) Lille	Loan
29 July 2014	(Scotland) Andrew Robertson	(Scotland) Dundee United	Hull City	£2.85m
29 July 2014	Conor Townsend	Hull City	(Scotland) Dundee United	Loan
29 July 2014	(Switzerland) Frédéric Veseli	Ipswich Town	Port Vale	Loan
30 July 2014	Ryan Bertrand	Chelsea	Southampton	Loan
30 July 2014	James Husband	Doncaster Rovers	Middlesbrough	Swap + Undisclosed
30 July 2014	(Scotland) Denny Johnstone	(Scotland) Celtic	Birmingham City	Undisclosed
30 July 2014	(Belgium) Romelu Lukaku	Chelsea	Everton	£28m
30 July 2014	Curtis Main	Middlesbrough	Doncaster Rovers	Swap
31 July 2014	(Hungary) Bálint Bajner	Unattached	Ipswich Town	Free
31 July 2014	Reece Brown	Watford	Barnsley	Undisclosed
31 July 2014	(Mauritius) Kévin Bru	Unattached	Ipswich Town	Free
31 July 2014	(Costa Rica) José Miguel Cubero	(Costa Rica) Herediano	Blackpool	Undisclosed
31 July 2014	(Northern Ireland) Joe Dudgeon	Hull City	Barnsley	Loan
31 July 2014	Carl Jenkinson	Arsenal	West Ham United	Loan
31 July 2014	(France) Gaël Kakuta	Chelsea	(Spain) Rayo Vallecano	Loan
31 July 2014	Tom Lees	Leeds United	Sheffield Wednesday	Undisclosed
31 July 2014	Mitch Rose	Rotherham United	Crawley Town	Loan
31 July 2014	Daniel Rowe	Rotherham United	Wycombe Wanderers	Loan
31 July 2014	Nicky Walker	Rotherham United	Wycombe Wanderers	Loan
1 August 2014	(Paraguay) Javier Acuña	Watford	(Paraguay) Olimpia	Undisclosed
1 August 2014	(Bulgaria) Nikolay Bodurov	(Bulgaria) Litex Lovech	Fulham	Undisclosed
1 August 2014	Matthew Briggs	Unattached	Millwall	Free
1 August 2014	(Montserrat) Donervon Daniels	West Bromwich Albion	Blackpool	Loan
1 August 2014	(Spain) Iago Falque	Tottenham Hotspur	(Italy) Genoa	Undisclosed
1 August 2014	(Norway) Brede Hangeland	Unattached	Crystal Palace	Free
1 August 2014	(Equatorial Guinea) Emilio Nsue	(Spain) Mallorca	Middlesbrough	Undisclosed
1 August 2014	(Finland) Daniel O'Shaughnessy	(France) Metz	Brentford	Free
1 August 2014	Jed Steer	Aston Villa	Doncaster Rovers	Loan
1 August 2014	John Swift	Chelsea	Rotherham United	Loan
2 August 2014	Eric Dier	(Portugal) Sporting CP	Tottenham Hotspur	£4m
2 August 2014	Brendan Galloway	Milton Keynes Dons	Everton	Undisclosed
3 August 2014	(Argentina) Facundo Ferreyra	(Ukraine) Shakhtar Donetsk	Newcastle United	Loan
3 August 2014	(Spain) Joan Oriol	Unattached	Blackpool	Free
3 August 2014	(Spain) Oriol Romeu	Chelsea	(Germany) VfB Stuttgart	Loan
4 August 2014	Benik Afobe	Arsenal	Milton Keynes Dons	Loan
4 August 2014	(Slovenia) Žan Benedičič	(Italy) Milan	Leeds United	Loan
4 August 2014	(Republic of Ireland) Leon Best	Blackburn Rovers	Derby County	Loan
4 August 2014	Shaq Coulthirst	Tottenham Hotspur	Southend United	Loan
4 August 2014	(Northern Ireland) Josh McQuoid	Bournemouth	Coventry City	Loan
4 August 2014	Carlton Morris	Norwich City	Oxford United	Loan
4 August 2014	(Italy) Gianni Munari	(Italy) Parma	Watford	Loan
4 August 2014	(Republic of Ireland) Anthony O'Connor	Blackburn Rovers	Plymouth Argyle	Loan
5 August 2014	Nicky Ajose	Peterborough United	Leeds United	Undisclosed
5 August 2014	(Scotland) Jordan Archer	Tottenham Hotspur	Northampton Town	Loan
5 August 2014	(Republic of Ireland) Cian Bolger	Bolton Wanderers	Southend United	Undisclosed
5 August 2014	(Australia) Jason Davidson	(Netherlands) Heracles	West Bromwich Albion	Undisclosed
5 August 2014	(Costa Rica) Cristian Gamboa	(Norway) Rosenborg	West Bromwich Albion	Undisclosed
5 August 2014	Joe Lewis	(Wales) Cardiff City	Blackpool	Loan
5 August 2014	(Spain) Antonio Luna	Aston Villa	(Italy) Hellas Verona	Loan
5 August 2014	Jordon Mutch	(Wales) Cardiff City	Queens Park Rangers	£6m
5 August 2014	Gary O'Neil	Unattached	Norwich City	Free
5 August 2014	Jack Rodwell	Manchester City	Sunderland	£10m
5 August 2014	(Netherlands) Ricky van Wolfswinkel	Norwich City	(France) Saint-Étienne	Loan
6 August 2014	Michail Antonio	Sheffield Wednesday	Nottingham Forest	£1.5m
6 August 2014	(Democratic Republic of the Congo) Britt Assombalonga	Peterborough United	Nottingham Forest	£5.5m
6 August 2014	(Republic of Ireland) Samir Carruthers	Aston Villa	Milton Keynes Dons	Undisclosed
6 August 2014	Conor Coady	Liverpool	Huddersfield Town	Undisclosed
6 August 2014	(Chile) Mauricio Isla	(Italy) Juventus	Queens Park Rangers	Loan
6 August 2014	(Slovenia) Dejan Kelhar	Unattached	Sheffield Wednesday	Free
6 August 2014	(Slovakia) Filip Kiss	(Wales) Cardiff City	(Scotland) Ross County	Loan
6 August 2014	Frank Lampard	(United States) New York City	Manchester City	Loan
6 August 2014	John Lundstram	Everton	Blackpool	Loan
6 August 2014	(Spain) Omar Mascarell	(Spain) Real Madrid	Derby County	Loan
6 August 2014	(Spain) Javier Manquillo	(Spain) Atlético Madrid	Liverpool	Loan
6 August 2014	Ishmael Miller	Unattached	Blackpool	Free
6 August 2014	(Nigeria) Kenneth Omeruo	Chelsea	Middlesbrough	Loan
6 August 2014	(Italy) Dani Osvaldo	Southampton	(Italy) Internazionale	Loan
6 August 2014	Paul Robinson	Millwall	Portsmouth	Loan
6 August 2014	(Spain) Rubén Rochina	Blackburn Rovers	(Spain) Granada	Undisclosed
6 August 2014	(Algeria) Saphir Taïder	(Italy) Internazionale	Southampton	Loan
7 August 2014	Tom Adeyemi	Birmingham City	(Wales) Cardiff City	Undisclosed
7 August 2014	(France) El Hadji Ba	Sunderland	(France) Bastia	Loan
7 August 2014	Adam Campbell	Newcastle United	Fleetwood Town	Loan
7 August 2014	(Republic of Ireland) Simon Cox	Nottingham Forest	Reading	Undisclosed
7 August 2014	(Scotland) Stephen Dobbie	Crystal Palace	Fleetwood Town	Loan
7 August 2014	George Moncur	West Ham United	Colchester United	Loan
7 August 2014	Elliot Parish	Bristol City	Blackpool	Free
7 August 2014	(Germany) Nick Proschwitz	Hull City	Brentford	Free
7 August 2014	Tommy Smith	Unattached	Brentford	Free
7 August 2014	(Argentina) Santiago Vergini	(Argentina) Estudiantes	Sunderland	Loan
8 August 2014	Miles Addison	Bournemouth	Scunthorpe United	Loan
8 August 2014	(Northern Ireland) Ryan Brobbel	Middlesbrough	Hartlepool United	Loan
8 August 2014	(France) Aly Cissokho	(Spain) Valencia	Aston Villa	Undisclosed
8 August 2014	(Jamaica) Daniel Johnson	Aston Villa	Chesterfield	Loan
8 August 2014	(Scotland) Matthew Kennedy	Everton	(Scotland) Hibernian	Loan
8 August 2014	(Scotland) Jamie Mackie	Nottingham Forest	Reading	Loan
8 August 2014	(Spain) Andrea Orlandi	Unattached	Blackpool	Free
8 August 2014	(Spain) Pepe Reina	Liverpool	(Germany) Bayern Munich	Undisclosed
8 August 2014	Brad Smith	Liverpool	Swindon Town	Loan
8 August 2014	Jordan Turnbull	Southampton	Swindon Town	Loan
8 August 2014	(Argentina) Bruno Zuculini	(Argentina) Racing Club	Manchester City	Undisclosed
9 August 2014	James Alabi	Stoke City	Accrington Stanley	Loan
9 August 2014	Karl Darlow	Nottingham Forest	Newcastle United	Undisclosed
9 August 2014	Karl Darlow	Newcastle United	Nottingham Forest	Loan
9 August 2014	(Spain) Chico Flores	(Wales) Swansea City	(Qatar) Lekhwiya	Undisclosed
9 August 2014	Fraser Forster	(Scotland) Celtic	Southampton	£10m
9 August 2014	Jamaal Lascelles	Nottingham Forest	Newcastle United	Undisclosed
9 August 2014	Jamaal Lascelles	Newcastle United	Nottingham Forest	Loan
9 August 2014	Alfie Mawson	Brentford	Wycombe Wanderers	Loan
9 August 2014	(Scotland) Stevie May	(Scotland) St Johnstone	Sheffield Wednesday	Undisclosed
9 August 2014	(Chile) Gary Medel	(Wales) Cardiff City	(Italy) Internazionale	£10m
9 August 2014	(Netherlands) Maarten Stekelenburg	Fulham	(France) Monaco	Loan
10 August 2014	(Belgium) Thomas Vermaelen	Arsenal	(Spain) Barcelona	£15m
11 August 2014	David Davis	Wolverhampton Wanderers	Birmingham City	Undisclosed
11 August 2014	Anton Ferdinand	(Turkey) Antalyaspor	Reading	Free
11 August 2014	(Honduras) Juan Carlos García	Wigan Athletic	(Spain) Tenerife	Loan
11 August 2014	(Chile) Ángelo Henríquez	Manchester United	(Croatia) Dinamo Zagreb	Loan
11 August 2014	(France) Eliaquim Mangala	(Portugal) Porto	Manchester City	£32m
11 August 2014	(Republic of Ireland) Joe Mason	(Wales) Cardiff City	Bolton Wanderers	Loan
11 August 2014	(Bulgaria) Aleksandar Tonev	Aston Villa	(Scotland) Celtic	Loan
12 August 2014	(Belgium) Jason Denayer	Manchester City	(Scotland) Celtic	Loan
12 August 2014	(France) Joël Dielna	Unattached	Blackpool	Free
12 August 2014	(Republic of Ireland) Anthony Forde	Wolverhampton Wanderers	Walsall	Undisclosed
12 August 2014	Greg Leigh	Manchester City	Crewe Alexandra	Loan
12 August 2014	(Belgium) Jeffrey Rentmeister	(Belgium) Westerlo	Blackpool	Free
13 August 2014	(Ghana) Christian Atsu	Chelsea	Everton	Loan
13 August 2014	Mason Bennett	Derby County	Bradford City	Loan
13 August 2014	Jacob Butterfield	Middlesbrough	Huddersfield Town	Swap
13 August 2014	Adam Clayton	Huddersfield Town	Middlesbrough	Swap
13 August 2014	(Scotland) Liam Coogans	(Scotland) Airdrieonians	Huddersfield Town	Undisclosed
13 August 2014	(Scotland) Liam Cooper	Chesterfield	Leeds United	Undisclosed
13 August 2014	(Scotland) Alex Jakubiak	Watford	Oxford United	Loan
13 August 2014	Billy Sharp	Southampton	Leeds United	Undisclosed
13 August 2014	(United States) DeAndre Yedlin	(United States) Seattle Sounders	Tottenham Hotspur	Undisclosed
13 August 2014	(United States) DeAndre Yedlin	Tottenham Hotspur	(United States) Seattle Sounders	Loan
14 August 2014	Will Buckley	Brighton & Hove Albion	Sunderland	Undisclosed
14 August 2014	(Spain) Javi García	Manchester City	(Russia) Zenit	£13m
14 August 2014	(Romania) Florin Gardoș	(Romania) Steaua București	Southampton	£6m
14 August 2014	Martin Kelly	Liverpool	Crystal Palace	Undisclosed
14 August 2014	(Republic of Ireland) Shane Long	Hull City	Southampton	£12m
14 August 2014	(Scotland) Jamie Ness	Stoke City	Crewe Alexandra	Loan
14 August 2014	Paul Taylor	Ipswich Town	Rotherham United	Loan
14 August 2014	(Germany) Robert Tesche	Unattached	Nottingham Forest	Free
15 August 2014	Stephen Bywater	Millwall	Gillingham	Loan
15 August 2014	(Bosnia and Herzegovina) Dino Fazlic	Unattached	Fulham	Free
15 August 2014	Sean Morrison	Reading	(Wales) Cardiff City	Undisclosed
15 August 2014	(Spain) Jota	(Spain) Celta Vigo	Brentford	Undisclosed
15 August 2014	(Republic of Ireland) Mark O'Brien	Derby County	(Scotland) Motherwell	Loan
15 August 2014	(Republic of Ireland) Anthony Pilkington	Norwich City	(Wales) Cardiff City	£1m
15 August 2014	(Senegal) Diafra Sakho	(France) Metz	West Ham United	Undisclosed
15 August 2014	(Republic of Ireland) Conor Sammon	Derby County	Ipswich Town	Loan
15 August 2014	(Colombia) Carlos Sánchez	(Spain) Elche	Aston Villa	Undisclosed
15 August 2014	(Portugal) João Carlos Teixeira	Liverpool	Brighton & Hove Albion	Loan
15 August 2014	(Spain) Jon Toral	Arsenal	Brentford	Loan
15 August 2014	(Republic of Ireland) Stephen Ward	Wolverhampton Wanderers	Burnley	Undisclosed
15 August 2014	(Ivory Coast) François Zoko	Unattached	Blackpool	Free
16 August 2014	(Spain) Damià	Unattached	Middlesbrough	Free
16 August 2014	(Spain) Alberto Moreno	(Spain) Sevilla	Liverpool	£12m
16 August 2014	(Nigeria) Victor Moses	Chelsea	Stoke City	Loan
16 August 2014	Nile Ranger	Unattached	Blackpool	Free
18 August 2014	Luke Armstrong	Unattached	Birmingham City	Free
18 August 2014	(Saint Lucia) Janoi Donacien	Aston Villa	Tranmere Rovers	Loan
18 August 2014	(Netherlands) Danny Holla	Unattached	Brighton & Hove Albion	Free
18 August 2014	(Portugal) Tiago Ilori	Liverpool	(France) Bordeaux	Loan
18 August 2014	(Republic of Ireland) Conrad Logan	Leicester City	Rochdale	Loan
18 August 2014	(Germany) Marko Marin	Chelsea	(Italy) Fiorentina	Loan
18 August 2014	Josh McEachran	Chelsea	(Netherlands) Vitesse Arnhem	Loan
18 August 2014	Luke O'Neill	Burnley	Scunthorpe United	Loan
18 August 2014	(Spain) Eduard Oriol	(Cyprus) AEL Limassol	Blackpool	Free
18 August 2014	(France) Kévin Théophile-Catherine	(Wales) Cardiff City	(France) Saint-Étienne	Loan
19 August 2014	Christian Burgess	Middlesbrough	Peterborough United	Loan
19 August 2014	Devante Cole	Manchester City	Barnsley	Loan
19 August 2014	Jack Marriott	Ipswich Town	Carlisle United	Loan
19 August 2014	(Northern Ireland) Paddy McCourt	Unattached	Brighton & Hove Albion	Free
19 August 2014	(Portugal) Nani	Manchester United	(Portugal) Sporting CP	Loan
20 August 2014	Joe Bennett	Aston Villa	Brighton & Hove Albion	Loan
20 August 2014	(Spain) Carlos Cuéllar	Unattached	Norwich City	Free
20 August 2014	(Netherlands) Leroy Fer	Norwich City	Queens Park Rangers	£8m
20 August 2014	(Argentina) Federico Fernández	(Italy) Napoli	(Wales) Swansea City	Undisclosed
20 August 2014	Cameron Jerome	Stoke City	Norwich City	Undisclosed
20 August 2014	(Argentina) Marcos Rojo	(Portugal) Sporting CP	Manchester United	£16m
21 August 2014	Kieran Agard	Rotherham United	Bristol City	Undisclosed
21 August 2014	(Italy) Mirco Antenucci	(Italy) Ternana	Leeds United	Undisclosed
21 August 2014	(Northern Ireland) Oliver Norwood	Huddersfield Town	Reading	Undisclosed
21 August 2014	Charlie Wyke	Middlesbrough	Reading	Loan
21 August 2014	(Chile) Eduardo Vargas	(Italy) Napoli	Queens Park Rangers	Loan
22 August 2014	(Argentina) Tiago Casasola	(Argentina) Boca Juniors	Fulham	Undisclosed
22 August 2014	Josh Clarke	Brentford	Dagenham & Redbridge	Loan
22 August 2014	Scott Harrison	Sunderland	Hartlepool United	Loan
22 August 2014	(Greece) Georgios Samaras	Unattached	West Bromwich Albion	Free
22 August 2014	Richard Smallwood	Middlesbrough	Rotherham United	Undisclosed
22 August 2014	Jayden Stockley	Bournemouth	Cambridge United	Loan
22 August 2014	Anthony Wordsworth	Ipswich Town	Rotherham United	Loan
23 August 2014	Joe Lumley	Queens Park Rangers	Accrington Stanley	Loan
24 August 2014	(Spain) Adrián Colunga	(Spain) Getafe	Brighton & Hove Albion	Undisclosed
25 August 2014	(Italy) Mario Balotelli	(Italy) Milan	Liverpool	£16m
25 August 2014	(Republic of Ireland) Rene Gilmartin	(Republic of Ireland) St Patrick's Athletic	Watford	Undisclosed
25 August 2014	Ryan Shotton	Stoke City	Derby County	Loan
25 August 2014	(Denmark) Casper Sloth	(Denmark) AGF	Leeds United	Undisclosed
26 August 2014	(Italy) Cristian Battocchio	Watford	(Italy) Virtus Entella	Loan
26 August 2014	Michael Dawson	Tottenham Hotspur	Hull City	Undisclosed
26 August 2014	(Argentina) Ángel Di María	(Spain) Real Madrid	Manchester United	£59.7m
26 August 2014	(Cameroon) Samuel Eto'o	Unattached	Everton	Free
26 August 2014	Gary Gardner	Aston Villa	Brighton & Hove Albion	Loan
26 August 2014	George Saville	Chelsea	Wolverhampton Wanderers	Undisclosed
27 August 2014	Sam Baldock	Bristol City	Brighton & Hove Albion	Undisclosed
27 August 2014	(Argentina) Federico Fazio	(Spain) Sevilla	Tottenham Hotspur	Undisclosed
28 August 2014	Reece Brown	Birmingham City	Notts County	Loan
28 August 2014	(Argentina) Esteban Cambiasso	Unattached	Leicester City	Free
28 August 2014	Ryan Fredericks	Tottenham Hotspur	Middlesbrough	Loan
28 August 2014	(Hungary) Gábor Király	(Germany) 1860 Munich	Fulham	Undisclosed
28 August 2014	John Marquis	Millwall	Cheltenham Town	Loan
28 August 2014	(Scotland) Conor McGrandles	(Scotland) Falkirk	Norwich City	£1m
28 August 2014	(Sweden) Mathias Ranégie	Watford	Millwall	Loan
28 August 2014	Jack Robinson	Liverpool	Queens Park Rangers	Undisclosed
28 August 2014	Jack Robinson	Queens Park Rangers	Huddersfield Town	Loan
28 August 2014	Wilfried Zaha	Manchester United	Crystal Palace	Loan
29 August 2014	(Australia) James Demetriou	Nottingham Forest	(Wales) Swansea City	Free
29 August 2014	(Mali) Tongo Doumbia	Wolverhampton Wanderers	(France) Toulouse	Undisclosed
29 August 2014	Shamir Fenelon	Brighton & Hove Albion	Rochdale	Loan
29 August 2014	(Australia) Giancarlo Gallifuoco	Unattached	(Wales) Swansea City	Free
29 August 2014	Hallam Hope	Everton	Sheffield Wednesday	Loan
29 August 2014	Jordon Ibe	Liverpool	Derby County	Loan
29 August 2014	Josh Lelan	Derby County	Swindon Town	Loan
29 August 2014	Alex McCarthy	Reading	Queens Park Rangers	Undisclosed
29 August 2014	(Belgium) Vadis Odjidja-Ofoe	(Belgium) Club Brugge	Norwich City	Undisclosed
29 August 2014	Jordan Slew	Blackburn Rovers	Port Vale	Loan
30 August 2014	(Brazil) Adryan	(Brazil) Flamengo	Leeds United	Loan
30 August 2014	(Denmark) Daniel Agger	Liverpool	(Denmark) Brøndby	£3m
30 August 2014	Patrick Bamford	Chelsea	Middlesbrough	Loan
30 August 2014	(Argentina) Sebastián Blanco	(Ukraine) Metalist Kharkiv	West Bromwich Albion	Undisclosed
30 August 2014	(Gabon) Frédéric Bulot	(Belgium) Standard Liège	Charlton Athletic	Loan
30 August 2014	(France) Claude Dielna	Unattached	Sheffield Wednesday	Free
30 August 2014	(United States) Duane Holmes	Huddersfield Town	Bury	Loan
30 August 2014	Danny Simpson	Queens Park Rangers	Leicester City	Undisclosed
30 August 2014	(Cameroon) Alex Song	(Spain) Barcelona	West Ham United	Loan
31 August 2014	(Italy) Dario Del Fabro	(Italy) Cagliari	Leeds United	Loan
31 August 2014	(Japan) Shinji Kagawa	Manchester United	(Germany) Borussia Dortmund	Undisclosed
31 August 2014	(Republic of Ireland) Brian Lenihan	(Republic of Ireland) Cork City	Hull City	Undisclosed
31 August 2014	(Greece) Kostas Mitroglou	Fulham	(Greece) Olympiacos	Loan
31 August 2014	(France) Loïc Rémy	Queens Park Rangers	Chelsea	£10.5m
31 August 2014	(Spain) Fernando Torres	Chelsea	(Italy) Milan	Loan
1 September 2014	(Hungary) Krisztián Adorján	Liverpool	(Italy) Novara	Undisclosed
1 September 2014	(Belgium) Toby Alderweireld	(Spain) Atlético Madrid	Southampton	Loan
1 September 2014	(Argentina) Ricardo Álvarez	(Italy) Internazionale	Sunderland	Loan
1 September 2014	(France) Morgan Amalfitano	(France) Marseille	West Ham United	Undisclosed
1 September 2014	(Morocco) Oussama Assaidi	Liverpool	Stoke City	Loan
1 September 2014	(The Gambia) Mo Barrow	(Sweden) Östersund	(Wales) Swansea City	Undisclosed
1 September 2014	(Argentina) Luciano Becchio	Norwich City	Rotherham United	Loan
1 September 2014	(France) Hatem Ben Arfa	Newcastle United	Hull City	Loan
1 September 2014	(Portugal) Betinho	(Portugal) Sporting CP	Brentford	Loan
1 September 2014	Jamal Blackman	Chelsea	Middlesbrough	Loan
1 September 2014	(Netherlands) Daley Blind	(Netherlands) Ajax	Manchester United	£13.8m
1 September 2014	(Scotland) George Boyd	Hull City	Burnley	£3m
1 September 2014	(Wales) Alex Bray	(Wales) Swansea City	Plymouth Argyle	Loan
1 September 2014	(Spain) José Cañas	(Wales) Swansea City	(Spain) Espanyol	Free
1 September 2014	Nathaniel Chalobah	Chelsea	Burnley	Loan
1 September 2014	Jonson Clarke-Harris	Oldham Athletic	Rotherham United	Undisclosed
1 September 2014	Tom Cleverley	Manchester United	Aston Villa	Loan
1 September 2014	(Uruguay) Sebastián Coates	Liverpool	Sunderland	Loan
1 September 2014	(France) Andy Delort	Brenford	(France) Tours	Undisclosed
1 September 2014	(Senegal) Mohamed Diamé	West Ham United	Hull City	Undisclosed
1 September 2014	(Senegal) Souleymane Doukara	(Italy) Catania	Leeds United	Undisclosed
1 September 2014	(Republic of Ireland) Kevin Doyle	Wolverhampton Wanderers	Crystal Palace	Loan
1 September 2014	(Netherlands) Royston Drenthe	Reading	Sheffield Wednesday	Loan
1 September 2014	(Republic of Ireland) Shane Duffy	Everton	Blackburn Rovers	Undisclosed
1 September 2014	(Morocco) Karim El Ahmadi	Aston Villa	(Netherlands) Feyenoord	Undisclosed
1 September 2014	(Colombia) Radamel Falcao	(France) Monaco	Manchester United	Loan
1 September 2014	Adam Forshaw	Brentford	Wigan Athletic	Undisclosed
1 September 2014	Zeki Fryers	Tottenham Hotspur	Crystal Palace	Undisclosed
1 September 2014	(Wales) Danny Gabbidon	Unattached	(Wales) Cardiff City	Free
1 September 2014	(Sweden) John Guidetti	Manchester City	(Scotland) Celtic	Loan
1 September 2014	(Belgium) David Henen	(Greece) Olympiacos	Everton	Loan
1 September 2014	(Uruguay) Abel Hernández	(Italy) Palermo	Hull City	£10m
1 September 2014	(Mexico) Javier Hernández	Manchester United	(Spain) Real Madrid	Loan
1 September 2014	Seb Hines	Middlesbrough	Coventry City	Loan
1 September 2014	(Germany) Lewis Holtby	Tottenham Hotspur	(Germany) Hamburger SV	Loan
1 September 2014	(Netherlands) Jos Hooiveld	Southampton	Norwich City	Loan
1 September 2014	Mark Hudson	(Wales) Cardiff City	Huddersfield Town	Undisclosed
1 September 2014	(Wales) Emyr Huws	Manchester City	Wigan Athletic	Undisclosed
1 September 2014	(Sweden) Alexander Kačaniklić	Fulham	(Denmark) Copenhagen	Loan
1 September 2014	Michael Keane	Manchester United	Burnley	Loan
1 September 2014	(Germany) Tom Koblenz	Unattached	Derby County	Free
1 September 2014	(Slovakia) Niko Kranjčar	(Ukraine) Dynamo Kyiv	Queens Park Rangers	Loan
1 September 2014	(Denmark) William Kvist	(Germany) VfB Stuttgart	Wigan Athletic	Free
1 September 2014	(Wales) Tom Lawrence	Manchester United	Leicester City	Undisclosed
1 September 2014	(Latvia) Vitālijs Maksimenko	Brighton & Hove Albion	(Netherlands) VVV	Loan
1 September 2014	(Senegal) Sadio Mané	(Austria) Red Bull Salzburg	Southampton	£10m
1 September 2014	(Gabon) Bruno Ecuele Manga	(France) Lorient	(Wales) Cardiff City	Undisclosed (Note: Fee in excess of £5m.)
1 September 2014	(Scotland) James McArthur	Wigan Athletic	Crystal Palace	£7m
1 September 2014	(Spain) Ignasi Miquel	Arsenal	Norwich City	Undisclosed
1 September 2014	(Japan) Ryo Miyaichi	Arsenal	(Netherlands) Twente	Loan
1 September 2014	(Paraguay) Brian Montenegro	(Paraguay) Nacional	Leeds United	Loan
1 September 2014	Glenn Murray	Crystal Palace	Reading	Loan
1 September 2014	(Spain) Álvaro Negredo	Manchester City	(Spain) Valencia	Loan
1 September 2014	Frank Nouble	Ipswich Town	Coventry City	Loan
1 September 2014	Jonathan Obika	Tottenham Hotspur	Swindon Town	Undisclosed
1 September 2014	Jack O'Connell	Blackburn Rovers	Rochdale	Loan
1 September 2014	Dominic Poleon	Leeds United	Oldham Athletic	Undisclosed
1 September 2014	Nick Powell	Manchester United	Leicester City	Loan
1 September 2014	Jack Price	Wolverhampton Wanderers	Yeovil Town	Loan
1 September 2014	(Uruguay) Gastón Ramírez	Southampton	Hull City	Loan
1 September 2014	Micah Richards	Manchester City	(Italy) Fiorentina	Loan
1 September 2014	(Brazil) Sandro	Tottenham Hotspur	Queens Park Rangers	£6m
1 September 2014	Kris Scott	(Wales) Swansea City	Leicester City	Free
1 September 2014	Matt Smith	Leeds United	Fulham	Undisclosed
1 September 2014	(France) Benjamin Stambouli	(France) Montpellier	Tottenham Hotspur	Undisclosed
1 September 2014	Jason Steele	Middlesbrough	Blackburn Rovers	Loan
1 September 2014	Jack Stephens	Southampton	Swindon Town	Loan
1 September 2014	Andrew Surman	Norwich City	Bournemouth	Undisclosed
1 September 2014	(Wales) Louis Thompson	Swindon Town	Norwich City	Undisclosed
1 September 2014	(Wales) Louis Thompson	Norwich City	Swindon Town	Loan
1 September 2014	(Scotland) Michael Tidser	Rotherham United	Oldham Athletic	Loan
1 September 2014	Ryan Tunnicliffe	Fulham	Blackburn Rovers	Loan
1 September 2014	(Netherlands) Marco van Ginkel	Chelsea	(Italy) Milan	Loan
1 September 2014	(Belgium) Jelle Vossen	(Belgium) Genk	Middlesbrough	Loan
1 September 2014	Ryan Watson	Leicester City	Northampton Town	Loan
1 September 2014	Danny Welbeck	Manchester United	Arsenal	£16m
1 September 2014	(Netherlands) Yanic Wildschut	(Netherlands) Heerenveen	Middlesbrough	Undisclosed
1 September 2014	(France) Mapou Yanga-Mbiwa	Newcastle United	(Italy) Roma	Loan

^{a} Player officially joined his club when the loan window for Football League clubs re-opened on 8 February.
^{b} Player officially joined his club on 1 July 2014.
