= 2014–15 Blackpool F.C. season =

English football club season

Blackpool F.C.
2014–15 season
- Owner: Owen Oyston
- Chairman: Karl Oyston
- Manager: José Riga (until 27 October); Lee Clark (from 29 October)
- Stadium: Bloomfield Road
- Football League Championship: 24th (relegated)
- FA Cup: Third round
- League Cup: First round
Home colours	Away colours	Third colours

The 2014–15 season was Blackpool F.C.'s fourth-consecutive season in the Football League Championship, the second tier of English professional football, and their 106th overall season in the Football League. They exited the League Cup at the first-round stage on 12 August and the FA Cup, also at the first hurdle, on 4 January. They were relegated to League One with six League fixtures remaining.

José Riga, in his first season as manager, was in charge for fourteen League games, before being sacked on 27 October with the club five points adrift at the foot of the table. Lee Clark succeeded him three days later. Clark, too, departed shortly after the season's conclusion.

== Season summary ==
=== Pre-season ===
Barry Ferguson, Blackpool's caretaker player-manager for the final twenty league games of the previous campaign, was not given the role full-time and left the club. Including Ferguson, Blackpool released 17 players, while five loan players returned to their parent clubs.

On 11 June Belgian José Riga was appointed as Blackpool's new manager. He was their first from overseas and their third full-time manager in two years. Blackpool had stated they would discuss contract terms with nine out of contract professionals, but of those only Tony McMahon signed a new deal to return to the club. Among the departees were Matt Gilks, the club's only remaining goalkeeper and player from their 2010–11 Premier League campaign, and Tom Ince, whose father, Paul, had been sacked as manager during the previous season. July. The Ince fee was decided by a tribunal, because Ince was under the age of 23, with the same rules applying in the case of Harrison McGahey, a scholar who made his professional debut the previous season, who also left the club, joining Sheffield United.

By 1 July, the day after pre-season training was due to begin, the club had just seven registered players. The decision was made to delay training until 3 July. The same day, Estonian striker Sergei Zenjov became the club's first signing of the close season. On 19 July Blackpool played their opening friendly at Penrith, winning 4–0 with a team of professionals, youth players and trialists. Their pre-season trip to Spain was cancelled on 15 July.

Eight days before their second and final friendly, at home to Premier League newcomers Burnley, the club still only had eight registered professionals. José Riga and chairman Karl Oyston were reported to be locked in a standoff over transfers. Riga also implemented a media blackout for himself and his staff, and had not spoken to the press since his appointment 44 days earlier.

On 24 July, in an open letter to club owner Owen Oyston and his son, club president Valeri Belokon demanded funds be put aside for player acquisitions. Three players were signed on 28 July, with a further three joining by 1 August. In their home friendly against Burnley on 2 August, Blackpool again fielded a host of trialists both in their starting line-up and on the bench, as the visitors won 1–0.

Between 3–8 August Blackpool added six further players to their squad, including goalkeepers Joe Lewis and Ell Parish. When midfielder Andrea Orlandi became Blackpool's 20th squad member on 8 August, the day before the start of the season, he was also their twelfth in as many days.

=== Regular season ===
On 9 August Blackpool lost their opening match of the season to Nottingham Forest. Blackpool had squad problems prior to the match; they had only nine players who "qualified" earlier in the day. They ultimately fielded 15 in their matchday squad, including two 17-year–old scholars from the youth academy. One of them, Dom Telford, was offered professional terms after his debut. A week later, in the first home league game of the new season, new signing Tomasz Cywka scored the club's first goal of the campaign in a 2–1 defeat to Blackburn. The club has continued to make acquisitions and by 16 August the signing of Edu Oriol saw the first-team squad reach 26 players. On 30 August, defeat to Millwall, managed by former Blackpool boss Ian Holloway, saw the club go without a point in five games in August.

On 13 September, Blackpool gained their first point in their sixth league game of the season, a goalless draw with Wolves at Bloomfield Road. They would have to wait until 3 October for their first win, a 1–0 defeat of Cardiff in their 11th league game. However, this was followed by three consecutive losses, after which Riga was sacked on 27 October and replaced two days later by Lee Clark. The former Birmingham manager lost his first game, 2–0 at home to Ipswich on 1 December, but secured his first point with a 2–2 draw at Fulham four days later. However, on 1 December Blackpool lost 3–1 at Leeds, meaning they had lost 12, drawn four and won only one of their first 17 league fixtures.

Successive draws with Bolton and Rotherham followed the defeat to Leeds, before Clark sealed his first win in his sixth game in charge, a 1–0 home defeat of his former club Birmingham City on 6 December. Blackpool extended their undefeated run with a 2–2 draw at Charlton a week later. However, the following game they lost 6–1 at home to Bournemouth.

Having secured a point from two games over the Christmas period, on 10 January 2015, their first league game of the year, Blackpool sealed their third win of the season, defeating Holloway's Millwall at home. Away defeats followed, 2–0 at Wolves and 7–2 at Watford, having been 2–0 up, before they secured what proved to be their fourth and last win of the campaign against Brighton on 31 January. 17-year-old Henry Cameron made his professional debut in the 1–0 win, becoming the 44th player used by the club that season.

Consecutive defeats to Norwich and Middlesbrough followed, before a 4–4 draw with Nottingham Forest on Valentine's Day, their first such result in 2,252 home league games. A 1–1 draw at local rivals Blackburn came a week later before Blackpool embarked on a six-match losing run (scoring one goal in the process) by which point they had lost the equivalent of one full league season (46 games) out of the last two played, with eight games remaining of 2014–15.

On 21 March, Blackpool ended their run with a 1–1 home draw with Leeds, the first of three consecutive draws. On 6 April, the day before the third of these, they were officially relegated. Another run of four defeats followed, ending with their last away game of the season, the 3–2 defeat to Cardiff confirming they would not win away from Bloomfield Road all season, thus equalling a record from their 1908–09 campaign.

On 2 May 2015, the final day of the Championship season, Blackpool's home game against Huddersfield Town was abandoned after 48 minutes following a pitch invasion by Blackpool fans in protest at chairman Karl Oyston. The score was 0–0 at the time, and that's how the Football League declared it to subsequently stand. It was Blackpool's 18th-consecutive game without a victory and their points tally of 26 was the lowest in the English second tier since Stockport County picked up the same number of points when they finished bottom in the 2001-02 season.

Over the last two full league seasons played, Blackpool had claimed 11 wins from 92 games.

=== League Cup ===
Blackpool exited the League at the first-round stage after a single-goal defeat at Shrewsbury Town, managed by former Seasiders captain Micky Mellon, on 12 August. Two players, Jeffrey Rentmeister and Joël Dielna, played having signed earlier in the day.

=== FA Cup ===
On 4 January, Blackpool lost their FA Cup third round tie against Premier League club Aston Villa 1–0, with Christian Benteke scoring two minutes before the end of normal time. It was Blackpool's seventh exit at their first FA Cup hurdle in eight seasons.

== Players ==
=== First-team squad ===
No. = Squad number

Pos = Playing position

P = Number of games played

G = Number of goals scored

GK = Goalkeeper

DF = Defender

MF = Midfielder

FW = Forward

Left club during 2014–15

† Loan player

YTH = Youth team players named in first-team squad (Note: A dagger or YTH symbol is only displayed if the player was exclusively a loan player or academy scholar during the 2014-15 season. If they signed a professional contract over the course of the season then it is not displayed.)

L = Ended the season out on loan

2014–15 Blackpool player details (Note: All players who have been signed to the club since the opening day of the 2014–15 season are listed)
No.	Pos	Nat	Name	P	G	P	G	P	G	P	G	Notes
No.	Pos	Nat	Name	Championship		FA Cup		League Cup		Total		Notes
17	DF	(England)	Miles Addison	6 (0)	0	0 (0)	0	0 (0)	0	6 (0)	0	†
2	DF	(Scotland)	Tom Aldred	6 (0)	0	0 (0)	0	0 (0)	0	6 (0)	0	
27	FW	(England)	Tom Barkhuizen	4 (3)	0	0 (1)	0	0 (0)	0	4 (4)	0	
39	DF	(England)	Andre Blackman	2 (1)	0	0 (0)	0	0 (0)	0	2 (1)	0	
42	GK	(England)	Myles Boney	0 (0)	0	0 (0)	0	0 (0)	0	0 (0)	0	YTH
40	MF	(England)	Henry Cameron	10 (1)	1	0 (0)	0	0 (0)	0	10 (1)	1	
6	DF	(England)	Peter Clarke	37 (2)	2	1 (0)	0	1 (0)	0	39 (2)	2	
22	MF	(Costa Rica)	José Miguel Cubero	10 (2)	0	0 (0)	0	0 (0)	0	10 (2)	0	
7	MF	(Poland)	Tomasz Cywka	5 (1)	1	0 (0)	0	1 (0)	0	6 (1)	1	
2	DF	(Montserrat)	Donervon Daniels	19 (0)	1	0 (0)	0	0 (0)	0	19 (0)	1	†
9	FW	(England)	Steve Davies	11 (6)	5	1 (0)	0	0 (0)	0	12 (6)	5	L
14	FW	(England)	Nathan Delfouneso	21 (17)	3	1 (0)	0	1 (0)	0	23 (17)	3	
16	DF	(France)	Joël Dielna	1 (1)	0	0 (0)	0	0 (1)	0	1 (2)	0	
18	DF	(Republic of Ireland)	Charles Dunne	21 (1)	0	1 (0)	0	0 (0)	0	22 (1)	0	
12	MF	(England)	Chris Eagles	7 (0)	1	0 (0)	0	0 (0)	0	7 (0)	1	
25	DF	(England)	David Ferguson	6 (4)	1	0 (0)	0	0 (0)	0	6 (4)	1	
41	FW	(Scotland)	Islam Feruz	0 (2)	0	0 (0)	0	0 (0)	0	0 (2)	0	†
26	DF	(Republic of Ireland)	Kevin Foley	4 (0)	0	0 (0)	0	0 (0)	0	4 (0)	0	†
10	FW	(England)	Bobby Grant	0 (0)	0	0 (0)	0	0 (0)	0	0 (0)	0	L
32	DF	(England)	Grant Hall	11 (1)	1	0 (0)	0	0 (0)	0	11 (1)	1	†
38	MF	(England)	Alex Henshall	0 (2)	0	0 (0)	0	0 (0)	0	0 (2)	0	†
41	DF	(England)	Luke Higham	0 (0)	0	0 (0)	0	0 (0)	0	0 (0)	0	YTH
12	MF	(England)	Michael Jacobs	5 (0)	1	0 (0)	0	0 (0)	0	5 (0)	1	†
35	DF	(England)	Tom Kennedy	5 (0)	0	0 (0)	0	0 (0)	0	5 (0)	0	†
36	MF	(Belgium)	Jonathan Legear	0 (0)	0	0 (0)	0	0 (0)	0	0 (0)	0	
32	DF	(Republic of Ireland)	Brian Lenihan	2 (0)	0	0 (0)	0	0 (0)	0	2 (0)	0	†
1	GK	(England)	Joe Lewis	34 (0)	0	1 (0)	0	1 (0)	0	36 (0)	0	†
24	MF	(England)	John Lundstram	16 (1)	0	0 (0)	0	1 (0)	0	17 (1)	0	†
5	DF	(Scotland)	Gary MacKenzie	0 (0)	0	0 (0)	0	0 (0)	0	0 (0)	0	L
24	FW	(England)	Gary Madine	14 (1)	3	0 (0)	0	0 (0)	0	14 (1)	3	†
3	DF	(England)	Niall Maher	6 (4)	0	0 (0)	0	0 (0)	0	6 (4)	0	†
29	DF	(England)	Tony McMahon	28 (4)	1	1 (0)	0	0 (0)	0	29 (4)	1	L
8	MF	(England)	Jacob Mellis	4 (9)	0	0 (0)	0	1 (0)	0	5 (9)	0	L
15	MF	(Guinea-Bissau)	Formose Mendy	1 (2)	0	0 (0)	0	0 (0)	0	1 (2)	0	
17	FW	(England)	Ishmael Miller	16 (6)	2	0 (1)	0	0 (1)	0	16 (8)	2	
36	GK	(Canada)	Daniel Milton	0 (0)	0	0 (0)	0	0 (0)	0	0 (0)	0	YTH
25	MF	(England)	Jacob Murphy	8 (1)	2	0 (0)	0	0 (0)	0	8 (1)	2	†
37	DF	(Jamaica)	Nyron Nosworthy	5 (0)	0	0 (0)	0	0 (0)	0	5 (0)	0	L
48	DF	(Republic of Ireland)	Darren O'Dea	16 (3)	0	1 (0)	0	0 (0)	0	17 (3)	0	
31	MF	(England)	Jamie O'Hara	26 (1)	2	1 (0)	0	0 (0)	0	27 (1)	2	
38	MF	(England)	Stuart O'Keefe	3 (1)	0	0 (0)	0	0 (0)	0	3 (1)	0	†
20	MF	(England)	Connor Oliver	4 (2)	0	0 (0)	0	0 (0)	0	4 (2)	0	
23	MF	(Spain)	Edu Oriol	8 (2)	0	0 (0)	0	0 (0)	0	8 (2)	0	
3	DF	(Spain)	Joan Oriol	11 (0)	0	0 (0)	0	1 (0)	0	12 (0)	0	
11	MF	(Spain)	Andrea Orlandi	23 (5)	4	1 (0)	0	1 (0)	0	25 (5)	4	
43	MF	(England)	Bright Osayi-Samuel	1 (5)	0	0 (0)	0	0 (0)	0	1 (5)	0	YTH
21	GK	(England)	Elliot Parish	12 (1)	0	0 (0)	0	0 (0)	0	12 (1)	0	
4	MF	(England)	David Perkins	45 (0)	0	1 (0)	0	1 (0)	0	47 (0)	0	
19	FW	(England)	Nile Ranger	5 (9)	2	0 (0)	0	0 (0)	0	5 (9)	2	
28	DF	(Belgium)	Jeffrey Rentmeister	7 (1)	0	0 (0)	0	1 (0)	0	8 (1)	0	
12	MF	(England)	Joe Rothwell	1 (2)	0	0 (0)	0	0 (0)	0	1 (2)	0	†
30	FW	(France)	Saër Sène	0 (1)	0	0 (0)	0	0 (0)	0	0 (1)	0	
34	FW	(England)	Dom Telford	9 (5)	1	0 (1)	0	0 (0)	0	9 (6)	1	YTH
33	MF	(England)	Mark Waddington	1 (2)	0	1 (0)	0	0 (1)	0	2 (3)	0	YTH
20	FW	(Estonia)	Sergei Zenjov	2 (6)	0	0 (0)	0	1 (0)	0	3 (6)	0	
13	FW	(Ivory Coast)	Francois Zoko	7 (7)	1	0 (0)	0	0 (0)	0	7 (7)	1	L

- Players used: 56
- Goals scored: 36 (all in the league)

== Results ==
=== Pre-season and friendlies ===
19 July 2014 1	Penrith	0–4	Blackpool	Penrith
15:00 BST			Delfouneso (2); Grant; Zenjov	Stadium: Frenchfield Park

2 August 2014 2	Blackpool	0–1	Burnley	Blackpool
15:00 BST				Stadium: Bloomfield Road; Attendance: 2,389

=== The Championship ===
9 August 2014 1	Nottingham Forest	2–0	Blackpool	Nottingham
15:00 BST	Antonio 25'; Burke 30'	Report		Stadium: City Ground; Attendance: 20,028; Referee: Tony Harrington

16 August 2014 2	Blackpool	1–2	Blackburn Rovers	Blackpool
15:00 BST	Cywka 53'	Report	Gestede 26', 47'	Stadium: Bloomfield Road; Attendance: 12,130; Referee: James Adcock

19 August 2014 3	Blackpool	1–2	Brentford	Blackpool
19:45	Delfouneso 17'	Report	Pritchard 37'; Dallas 52'	Stadium: Bloomfield Road; Attendance: 9,939; Referee: Mark Haywood

23 August 2014 4	Wigan Athletic	1–0	Blackpool	Wigan
15:00	Riera 37'	Report		Stadium: DW Stadium; Attendance: 12,113; Referee: Carl Boyeson

30 August 2014 5	Millwall	2–1	Blackpool	London
15:00	McDonald 33'; Malone 51'	Report	Ranger 71'	Stadium: The Den; Attendance: 9,877; Referee: Andy Woolmer

13 September 2014 6	Blackpool	0–0	Wolverhampton Wanderers	Blackpool
15:00		Report		Stadium: Bloomfield Road; Attendance: 12,233; Referee: Mick Russell

16 September 2014 7	Blackpool	0–1	Watford	Blackpool
19:45		Report	Vydra 68' (pen.)	Stadium: Bloomfield Road; Attendance: 9,695; Referee: Scott Duncan

20 September 2014 8	Brighton & Hove Albion	0–0	Blackpool	Falmer
15:00		Report		Stadium: Falmer Stadium; Attendance: 24,569; Referee: Keith Stroud

27 September 2014 9	Blackpool	1–3	Norwich City	Blackpool
15:00	Delfouneso 46'	Report	Daniels 54' (o.g.); Grabban 80'; Murphy 81'	Stadium: Bloomfield Road; Attendance: 11,232; Referee: Andre Marriner

30 September 2014 10	Middlesbrough	1–1	Blackpool	Middlesbrough
19:45	Ayala 19'	Report	Miller 25'	Stadium: Riverside Stadium; Attendance: 15,213; Referee: Paul Tierney

3 October 2014 11	Blackpool	1–0	Cardiff City	Blackpool
19:45	Zoko 64'	Report		Stadium: Bloomfield Road; Attendance: 10,502; Referee: Dean Whitestone

18 October 2014 12	Huddersfield Town	4–2	Blackpool	Huddersfield
15:00	Holt 4'; Bunn 11', 16'; Butterfield 61'	Report	McMahon 45'; Daniels 45+2'	Stadium: John Smith's Stadium; Attendance: 14,238; Referee: Darren Bond

21 October 2014 13	Blackpool	0–1	Derby County	Blackpool
19:45		Report	Martin 81' (pen.)	Stadium: Bloomfield Road; Attendance: 11,036; Referee: Kevin Wright

25 October 2014 14	Reading	3–0	Blackpool	Reading
15:00	Murray 23'; Clarke 69' (o.g.); Blackman 90+4' (pen.)	Report		Stadium: Madejski Stadium; Attendance: 15,625; Referee: Gavin Ward

1 November 2014 15	Blackpool	0–2	Ipswich Town	Blackpool
15:00		Report	McGoldrick 26'; Murphy 61'	Stadium: Bloomfield Road; Attendance: 10,918; Referee: Andy Haines

5 November 2014 16	Fulham	2–2	Blackpool	London
20:00 GMT	Parker 45+1'; Ruiz 73'	Report	Miller 2'; Murphy 26'	Stadium: Craven Cottage; Attendance: 14,325; Referee: Robert Madley

8 November 2014 17	Leeds United	3–1	Blackpool	Leeds
15:00 GMT	Cooper 9'; Doukara 31'; Antenucci 42'	Report	Ranger 75'	Stadium: Elland Road; Attendance: 18,698; Referee: Stuart Attwell

22 November 2014 18	Blackpool	1–1	Bolton Wanderers	Blackpool
15:00 GMT	Murphy 75'	Report	C.Y. Lee 82'	Stadium: Bloomfield Road; Attendance: 12,181; Referee: Nigel Miller

29 November 2014 19	Rotherham United	1–1	Blackpool	Rotherham
15:00 GMT	Bowery 78'	Report	Davies 85'	Stadium: New York Stadium; Attendance: 9,381; Referee: Tony Harrington

6 December 2014 20	Blackpool	1–0	Birmingham City	Blackpool
15:00 GMT	Davies 56'	Report		Stadium: Bloomfield Road; Attendance: 11,672; Referee: David Coote

13 December 2014 21	Charlton Athletic	2–2	Blackpool	London
15:00 GMT	Buyens 38' (pen.); Cousins 55'	Report	Eagles 25'; Davies 89'	Stadium: The Valley; Attendance: 15,411; Referee: Andy Davies

20 December 2014 22	Blackpool	1–6	Bournemouth	Blackpool
15:00 GMT	Delfouneso 65'	Report	Ritchie 18', 59'; Wilson 42'; Pitman 67' (pen.); Pugh 73'; Arter 76'	Stadium: Bloomfield Road; Attendance: 10,014; Referee: Andy Madley

26 December 2014 23	Sheffield Wednesday	1–0	Blackpool	Sheffield
15:00 GMT	Maguire 39' (pen.)	Report	Miller (yellow card) 59' (yellow-red card) 90+5'	Stadium: Hillsborough; Attendance: 26,609; Referee: James Adcock

28 December 2014 24	Blackpool	1–1	Rotherham United	Blackpool
15:00 GMT	Telford 84'	Report	Ledesma 57'	Stadium: Bloomfield Road; Attendance: 11,623; Referee: Scott Duncan

10 January 2015 25	Blackpool	1–0	Millwall	Blackpool
15:00 GMT	Clarke 33'	Report		Stadium: Bloomfield Road; Attendance: 9,994; Referee: Steve Martin

17 January 2015 26	Wolverhampton Wanderers	2–0	Blackpool	Wolverhampton
15:00 GMT	D. Edwards 86'; Afobe 90'	Report		Attendance: 28,132; Referee: Kevin Johnson

24 January 2015 27	Watford	7–2	Blackpool	Watford
15:00 GMT	Ighalo 47', 54', 73', 81'; Deeney 53'; Vydra 59'; Angella 66'	Report	Orlandi 8'; S. Davies 42'	Stadium: Vicarage Road; Attendance: 17,015; Referee: Fred Graham

31 January 2015 28	Blackpool	1–0	Brighton & Hove Albion	Blackpool
15:00 GMT	O'Hara 75'	Report		Stadium: Bloomfield Road; Attendance: 10,575; Referee: Seb Stockbridge

7 February 2015 29	Norwich City	4–0	Blackpool	Norwich
15:00 GMT	Hooper 12', 24', 56' (pen.); Redmond 90+4'	Report		Stadium: Carrow Road; Attendance: 26,017; Referee: Simon Hooper

10 February 2015 30	Blackpool	1–2	Middlesbrough	Blackpool
19:45 GMT	Gibson 85' (o.g.)	Report	Woodgate 81'; Kike 88'	Stadium: Bloomfield Road; Attendance: 10,806; Referee: Chris Kavanagh

14 February 2015 31	Blackpool	4–4	Nottingham Forest	Blackpool
15:00 GMT	Aldred (yellow card) 40' (yellow-red card) 76'; Madine 45+1'; Orlandi 66'; S. Davies 73'; Ferguson 90+7'	Report	Blackstock 68'; Gardner 70'; Lansbury 77' (pen.); Burke 90+5'	Stadium: Bloomfield Road; Attendance: 11,712; Referee: Lee Probert

21 February 2015 32	Blackburn Rovers	1–1	Blackpool	Blackburn
15:00 GMT		Report		Stadium: Ewood Park; Attendance: 14,906; Referee: Mick Russell

24 February 2015 33	Brentford	4–0	Blackpool	Brentford
19:45 GMT	Toral 16', 18', 89'; Gray 52'	Report	Dunne (red card) 44'	Stadium: Griffin Park; Attendance: 8,765; Referee: Andy D'Urso

28 February 2015 34	Blackpool	1–3	Wigan Athletic	Blackpool
15:00 GMT	O'Hara (yellow card) 27'; McMahon (yellow card) 51'; Madine 85'; Davies (yellow card) 90'	Report	Kim Bo-kyung 45'; Maguire 67'; Perch (yellow card) 75'; McClean 79'; Clarke (yellow card) 90'	Stadium: Bloomfield Road; Attendance: 11,679; Referee: Keith Stroud

4 March 2015 35	Birmingham City	1–0	Blackpool	Birmingham
19:45 GMT	Shinnie 36'; Davis (yellow card) 65'	Report	Maher (yellow card) 47'	Stadium: St Andrew's; Attendance: 15,111; Referee: Stuart Attwell

7 March 2015 36	Blackpool	0–1	Sheffield Wednesday	Blackpool
15:00 GMT	Barkhuizen (yellow card) 53'; Telford (yellow card) 70'; Clarke (yellow card) 77'	Report	Lees (yellow card) 15'; McGugan 54'; Dielna (yellow card) 70'; Hélan (yellow card) 80'	Stadium: Bloomfield Road; Attendance: 11,887; Referee: Graham Scott

14 March 2015 37	Bournemouth	4–0	Blackpool	Bournemouth
15:00 GMT	Pitman 10', 36', 39'; Wilson 49' (pen.); Elphick (yellow card) 54'; Ritchie (yellow card) 77'	Report	Barkhuizen (yellow card) 58'; McMahon (yellow card) 90'	Stadium: Goldsands Stadium; Attendance: 10,013; Referee: Chris Sarginson

17 March 2015 38	Blackpool	0–3	Charlton Athletic	Blackpool
19:45 GMT	Barkhuizen (yellow card) 87'	Report	Eagles 31'; Diarra (yellow card) 37'; Church 61' (yellow card) 86'; Guðmundsson 88'	Stadium: Bloomfield Road; Attendance: 9,168; Referee: David Webb

21 March 2015 39	Blackpool	1–1	Leeds United	Blackpool
15:00 GMT	Madine 44'; Cubero (yellow card) 61'; Andrea Orlandi (yellow card) 90+2'	Report	Antenucci 62'; Byram (yellow card) 66'; Bellusci (yellow card) 90+6'	Stadium: Bloomfield Road; Attendance: 11,688; Referee: Scott Duncan

4 April 2015 40	Bolton Wanderers	1–1	Blackpool	Bolton
15:00 BST	Feeney (yellow card) 15'; Vela (yellow card) 77'; Guðjohnsen 90+4'	Report	Jacobs 9'; Clarke (yellow card) 65'; Madine (yellow card) 89'; Lewis (yellow card) 90+5'	Stadium: Macron Stadium; Attendance: 17,076; Referee: David Coote

7 April 2015 41	Blackpool	1–1	Reading	Blackpool
19:45 BST	O'Hara 6' (pen.) (yellow card) 90+4'	Report	McCleary (yellow card) 39'; Hall 46' (o.g.); Gunter (yellow card) 57'	Stadium: Bloomfield Road; Attendance: 9,614; Referee: Geoff Eltringham

11 April 2015 42	Ipswich Town	3–2	Blackpool	Ipswich
15:00 BST	Sears 24' 28'; Berra 83'	Report	Andrea Orlandi 4'; Cameron 63'	Stadium: Portman Road; Attendance: 19,290; Referee: James Linington

14 April 2015 43	Derby County	4–0	Blackpool	Derby
19:45 BST	Bryson 3'; Ince 28'; Bent 29' 65' (pen.)	Report		Stadium: ipro Stadium; Attendance: 27,227; Referee: Oliver Langford

18 April 2015 44	Blackpool	0–1	Fulham	Blackpool
15:00 BST		Report	Smith 8'	Stadium: Bloomfield Road; Attendance: 10,122; Referee: Eddie Ilderton

25 April 2015 45	Cardiff City	3–2	Blackpool	Cardiff
15:00 BST	Mason 19'; Doyle 31' (pen.) 76' (pen.)	Report	Orlandi 48'; Clarke 90'	Stadium: Cardiff City Stadium; Attendance: 26,357; Referee: Steve Martin

2 May 2015 46	Blackpool	0–0	Huddersfield Town	Blackpool
12:15 BST		Report		Stadium: Bloomfield Road; Referee: Mick Russell
Note: Match abandoned after 48 minutes, with the score 0–0, with the result later declared as such

=== League Cup ===
12 August 2014 1	Shrewsbury Town	1–0	Blackpool	Shrewsbury
19:45 BST	Vernon 34'	Report		Stadium: Greenhous Meadow; Attendance: 4,524; Referee: Mark Heywood

=== FA Cup ===
4 January 2015 3	Aston Villa	1–0	Blackpool	Birmingham
15:00 BST	Benteke 88'	Report		Stadium: Villa Park; Attendance: 21,837; Referee: Chris Foy

== Table ==
Pos	Team	Pld	W	D	L	GF	GA	GD	Pts	Promotion, qualification or relegation
20	Brighton & Hove Albion	46	10	17	19	44	54	−10	47	
21	Rotherham United	46	11	16	19	46	67	−21	46 (Note: Rotherham United were deducted three points for fielding an ineligible player.)	
22	Millwall (R)	46	9	14	23	42	76	−34	41	Relegation to Football League One
23	Wigan Athletic (R)	46	9	12	25	39	64	−25	39	Relegation to Football League One
24	Blackpool (R)	46	4	14	28	36	91	−55	26	Relegation to Football League One

Updated to match(es) played on 2 May 2015. Source: Sky Sports
Rules for classification: 1) Points; 2) Goal difference; 3) Number of goals scored
(R) Relegated

== Transfers ==
Blackpool released 17 players at the start of the season, while eight more rejected the offers of new contracts. Their contracted players at the start of pre-season were Tom Barkhuizen, Steven Davies, Charles Dunne, Bobby Grant, Gary MacKenzie, Tony McMahon and David Perkins. Blackpool signed 42 players over the course of the season, 26 as contracted players and 16 on loan. Of those signed to contracts, seven would depart permanently before the end of the season.

=== In ===
Date	Pos	Player	From	Fee	Ref
3 July 2014	FW	(Estonia) Sergei Zenjov	Karpaty Lviv	Free	
28 July 2014	MF	(England) Jacob Mellis	Unattached	Free	
28 July 2014	MF	(Poland) Tomasz Cywka	Unattached	Free	
28 July 2014	DF	(England) Peter Clarke	Unattached	Free	
29 July 2014	FW	(England) Nathan Delfouneso	Unattached	Free	
31 July 2014	MF	(Costa Rica) José Miguel Cubero	Herediano	Undisclosed	
3 August 2014	DF	(Spain) Joan Oriol	Osasuna	Undisclosed	
6 August 2014	FW	(England) Ishmael Miller	Unattached	Free	
7 August 2014	GK	(England) Ell Parish	Bristol City	Free	
8 August 2014	MF	(Spain) Andrea Orlandi	Unattached	Free	
12 August 2014	DF	(Belgium) Jeffrey Rentmeister	Westerlo	Undisclosed	
12 August 2014	MF	(France) Joël Dielna	Unattached	Free	
15 August 2014	MF	(Ivory Coast) François Zoko	Unattached	Free	
16 August 2014	MF	(England) Nile Ranger	Unattached	Free	
16 August 2014	MF	(Spain) Edu Oriol	Unattached	Free	
29 September 2014	DF	(England) Andre Blackman	Unattached	Free	
29 September 2014	MF	(Guinea-Bissau) Formose Mendy	Unattached	Free	
4 November 2014	MF	(Belgium) Jonathan Legear	Unattached	Undisclosed	
5 November 2014	MF	(England) Jamie O'Hara	Unattached	Short-term deal until January, later extended until end of season	
18 November 2014	MF	(England) Chris Eagles	Unattached	Free	
21 November 2014	DF	(Jamaica) Nyron Nosworthy	Unattached	Free	
4 December 2014	DF	(Republic of Ireland) Darren O'Dea	Unattached	Short-term deal until January, later extended until end of season	
9 January 2015	FW	(France) Saër Sène	Unattached	Short-term deal until end of season	
9 January 2015	DF	(England) David Ferguson	Sunderland	18-month contract	
9 January 2015	MF	(England) Connor Oliver	Sunderland	18-month contract	
2 February 2015	DF	(Scotland) Tom Aldred	Accrington Stanley	Undisclosed (initially joined on 3 day loan from 31 January)	

=== Loans in ===
Date from	Pos	Player	From	Duration	Ref
1 August 2014	DF	(Montserrat) Donervon Daniels	West Bromwich Albion	28-day loan (extended until 2 January)	
5 August 2014	GK	(England) Joe Lewis	Cardiff City	Full Season	
6 August 2014	MF	(England) John Lundstram	Everton	Full Season	
3 November 2014	MF	(England) Jacob Murphy	Norwich City	Three-month loan (ended 31 December)	
7 November 2014	DF	(Republic of Ireland) Brian Lenihan	Hull City	One-month loan	
22 November 2014	DF	(England) Tom Kennedy	Rochdale	Two-month loan	
27 November 2014	DF	(Republic of Ireland) Kevin Foley	Wolves	Until 3 January	
27 November 2014	MF	(England) Stuart O'Keefe	Crystal Palace	Until 1 January	
8 January 2015	DF	(England) Grant Hall	Tottenham Hotspur	Until end of season	
9 January 2015	MF	(England) Alex Henshall	Ipswich Town	One-month loan	
16 January 2015	FW	(Scotland) Islam Feruz	Chelsea	Until end of season	
22 January 2015	DF	(England) Niall Maher	Bolton Wanderers	One-month loan	
27 January 2015	MF	(England) Joe Rothwell	Manchester United	Until end of season	
10 February 2015	FW	(England) Gary Madine	Sheffield Wednesday	Until end of season	
3 March 2015	DF	(England) Miles Addison	Bournemouth	28-day loan (extended until end of season)	
12 March 2015	MF	(England) Michael Jacobs	Wolverhampton Wanderers	Until end of season	

=== Out ===
Date	Pos	Player	To	Fee	Ref
16 May 2014	DF	(England) Louis Almond		Released	
16 May 2014	FW	(Ivory Coast) Anderson Banvo		Released	
16 May 2014	DF	(Scotland) Kirk Broadfoot		Released	
16 May 2014	DF	(England) Jake Caprice		Released	
16 May 2014	MF	(England) James Caton		Released	
16 May 2014	FW	(England) Michael Chopra		Released	
16 May 2014	MF	(England) Adam Dodd		Released	
16 May 2014	FW	(Wales) Robert Earnshaw		Released	
16 May 2014	FW	(England) Nathan Eccleston		Released	
16 May 2014	MF	(Scotland) Barry Ferguson		Released	
16 May 2014	MF	(France) Elliot Grandin		Released	
16 May 2014	GK	(England) Mark Halstead		Released	
16 May 2014	MF	(Belgium) Faris Haroun		Released	
16 May 2014	GK	(Scotland) Chris Kettings		Released	
16 May 2014	MF	(England) Liam Tomsett		Released	
16 May 2014	FW	(England) Nathan Tyson		Released	
16 May 2014	GK	(Trinidad and Tobago) Tony Warner		Released	
5 June 2014	DF	(England) Chris Basham	Sheffield United	Free	
19 June 2014	MF	(England) Neal Bishop	Scunthorpe United	Free	
24 June 2014	DF	(Northern Ireland) Craig Cathcart	Watford	Free	
30 June 2014	MF	(Spain) Ángel Martínez		Unattached	
30 June 2014	DF	(England) Isaiah Osbourne		Unattached	
2 July 2014	GK	(Scotland) Matt Gilks	Burnley	Free	
7 July 2014	FW	(England) Tom Ince	Hull City	Tribunal-set fee	
16 July 2014	FW	(Jamaica) Ricardo Fuller	Millwall	Free	
18 July 2014	DF	(England) Harrison McGahey	Sheffield United	Tribunal-set fee	
2 December 2014	FW	(Estonia) Sergei Zenjov	Unattached	Mutual consent	
12 January 2015	DF	(Spain) Joan Oriol	Unattached	Mutual consent	
12 January 2015	MF	(Spain) Edu Oriol	Unattached	Mutual consent	
19 January 2015	MF	(England) Chris Eagles	Unattached	End of contract	
28 January 2015	MF	(Belgium) Jonathan Legear	Unattached	Mutual consent	
2 February 2015	FW	(England) Ishmael Miller	Huddersfield Town	Undisclosed	
23 April 2015	MF	(Guinea-Bissau) Formose Mendy	HJK Helsinki	Free	

=== Loans out ===
Date	Pos	Player	To	Duration	Ref
9 October 2014	FW	(England) Bobby Grant	Shrewsbury Town		
17 October 2014	FW	(England) Tom Barkhuizen	Morecambe		
22 November 2014	FW	(Ivory Coast) François Zoko	Bradford City	until 17 January 2015	
26 November 2014	MF	(Poland) Tomasz Cywka	Rochdale	until 6 January 2015	
22 January 2015	MF	(England) Jacob Mellis	Oldham Athletic		
2 February 2015	DF	(Scotland) Gary MacKenzie	Bradford City		
6 March 2015	FW	(England) Steven Davies	Sheffield United		
19 March 2015	DF	(Jamaica) Nyron Nosworthy	Portsmouth	Until end of season	
27 March 2015	DF	(England) Tony McMahon	Bradford City		

== Academy ==
Blackpool gave debuts to academy scholars Henry Cameron, Bright Osayi-Samuel, Dom Telford and Mark Waddington over the course of the season, with Cameron signing a professional deal in January. Fellow youth-team players Miles Boney, Luke Higham and Daniel Milton were unused substitutes for the first-team.
