= Mark Waddington (footballer) =

English footballer

Personal information
- Full name: Mark Thomas Waddington
- Date of birth: 11 October 1996 (age 30)
- Place of birth: Wigan, England
- Position: Midfielder

Youth career
- 2013–2015: Blackpool

Senior career*
Years	Team	Apps	(Gls)
2014–2015	Blackpool	3	(0)
2015–2019	Stoke City	0	(0)
2016	→ Kilmarnock (loan)	1	(0)
2019	→ Falkirk (loan)	14	(1)
2019–2020	Barrow	2	(0)
2020	→ Blyth Spartans (loan)	9	(0)
2021	Warrington Town	0	(0)
- * Club domestic league appearances and goals as of 14:46, 31 October 2021 (UTC)

Mark Thomas Waddington (born 11 October 1996) is a professional footballer who played as a midfielder.

Waddington began his career with Blackpool where he progressed through the youth ranks at Bloomfield Road and into the club's first team in the 2014–15 season. He joined Stoke City in July 2015. He did not break into the first team at Stoke and spent time out on loan at Scottish sides Kilmarnock and Falkirk. He joined Barrow in June 2019.

== Early life ==
Waddington was born in Wigan and attended Standish Community High School and began his career at Blackpool's academy. He also spent time playing for Wigan School Boys who were a collective group of talented individuals cherry picked from schools around the Wigan borough

== Career ==
=== Blackpool ===
At age 17, he made his first-team debut for the club on 12 August 2014, as a 60th-minute substitute in a League Cup fixture against Shrewsbury Town. On 9 January 2015, after rejecting a £200-a-week professional contract, Waddington and fellow youth player Dom Telford were turned away from training by Blackpool chairman Karl Oyston and told to play for the youth team until they accepted his offer. On 13 February 2015, Waddington fractured his fifth metatarsal in his right foot during training, which ruled him out for the rest of the 2014–15 season. It was later announced that he would have to undergo surgery on his right foot.

=== Stoke City ===
Waddington joined Stoke City in July 2015 along with Blackpool team-mate Dom Telford. Waddington was released by Stoke at the end of the 2018–19 season after failing to break into the first team.

==== Kilmarnock (loan) ====
Waddington joined Kilmarnock on loan on 24 June 2016, linking up with former Blackpool manager Lee Clark who he previously played under at the club. On 23 July 2016, Waddington made his debut for Kilmarnock starting in the Scottish League Cup tie at home to Greenock Morton, playing 55 minutes before being substituted. On 13 August 2016, he appeared as a 90th-minute substitute for Jordan Jones to make his league debut for Kilmarnock in the Scottish Premiership away to Hamilton. On 31 August 2016, Waddington's loan move to Kilmarnock was cut short and he returned to Stoke City.

==== Falkirk (loan) ====
On 3 January 2019 Waddington joined Scottish Championship side Falkirk on loan until the end of the 2018–19 season. Waddington played 14 times for the Bairns who finished bottom of the league and were relegated to the Scottish League One.

=== Barrow ===
On 28 June 2019, Wadington joined National League side Barrow on a one-year contract. At the end of a promotion winning season, Waddington was released.

==== Blyth Spartans (loan) ====
On 3 January 2020, Waddington signed for National League North side Blyth Spartans on loan for the remainder of the 2019/20 season. He moved to Croft Park having worked under Spartans manager Lee Clark on two separate occasions at Blackpool and Kilmarnock. Waddington featured 9 times for the club during his loan spell.

=== Warrington Town ===
In July 2021, Waddington joined Northern Premier League side Warrington Town.

== Coaching career ==
In January 2023, he became a coach at Bolton Wanderers after previously working for the club's Football in the Community scheme. He also held a similar role at former club Blackpool between 2021 and 2023.

== Career statistics ==
As of match played 8 February 2020

Appearances and goals by club, season and competition
Club	Season	League			FA Cup		League Cup		Other		Total	
Club	Season	Division	Apps	Goals	Apps	Goals	Apps	Goals	Apps	Goals	Apps	Goals
Blackpool	2014–15	Championship	3	0	1	0	1	0	—		5	0
Stoke City	2015–16	Premier League	0	0	0	0	0	0	—		0	0
Stoke City	2016–17	Premier League	0	0	0	0	0	0	—		0	0
Stoke City	2017–18	Premier League	0	0	0	0	0	0	—		0	0
Stoke City	2018–19	EFL Championship	0	0	0	0	0	0	—		0	0
Stoke City	Total		0	0	0	0	0	0	—		0	0
Stoke City U23	2017–18	—	—		—		—		2 (Note: Appearances in EFL Trophy)	0	2	0
Stoke City U23	2018–19	—	—		—		—		3	0	3	0
Stoke City U23	Total		—		—		—		5	0	5	0
Kilmarnock (loan)	2016–17	Scottish Premiership	1	0	0	0	1	0	0	0	2	0
Falkirk (loan)	2018–19	Scottish Championship	14	1	0	0	0	0	0	0	14	1
Barrow	2019–20	National League	2	0	0	0	0	0	0	0	2	0
Blyth Spartans (loan)	2019–20	National League North	9	0	0	0	0	0	0	0	9	0
Career total			29	1	1	0	1	0	5	0	37	1
