= Dom Telford =

English footballer (born 1996)

Personal information
- Full name: Dominic David Telford
- Date of birth: 5 December 1996 (age 29)
- Place of birth: Burnley, England
- Height: 5 ft 7 in (1.71 m)
- Position: Striker

Team information
- Current team: Bury

Youth career
- 2013–2014: Blackpool

Senior career*
Years	Team	Apps	(Gls)
2014–2015	Blackpool	14	(1)
2015–2018	Stoke City	0	(0)
2017–2018	→ Bristol Rovers (loan)	19	(3)
2018–2019	Bury	38	(6)
2019–2021	Plymouth Argyle	35	(3)
2021–2022	Newport County	52	(26)
2022–2023	Crawley Town	47	(12)
2023–2025	Barrow	54	(5)
2025	→ Barnet (loan)	15	(3)
2025–2026	Gateshead	18	(2)
2026–	Bury	0	(1)
- * Club domestic league appearances and goals as of 09:15, 18 October 2026 (UTC)

Dominic David Telford (born 5 December 1996) is an English professional footballer who plays as a striker for Northern Premier League Premier Division club Bury.

== Early life ==
Telford was born in Burnley and grew up in Clitheroe where he attended Ribblesdale High School. He played youth football for Clitheroe Wolves and also played for Lancashire Schools at Under-16 level, making 12 appearances for them in 2012–13.

== Career ==
=== Blackpool ===
Telford joined Blackpool as a first-year scholar with the youth team in June 2013 playing regularly for them in his first year with the club. In December, just after his 17th birthday, he was nominated for the League Football Education's goal of the month for November for a goal against Bury which was followed by a second nomination in January 2014 for a goal in December 2013 against Liverpool. The 35-yard chip against Liverpool was also nominated for the goal of the season award in June 2014.

Telford made his first-team debut for the club on 9 August as an 88th-minute substitute in the opening-day fixture against Nottingham Forest. In only his second substitute appearance for Blackpool, on 28 December, he scored his first senior goal, the equaliser in a 1–1 draw with Rotherham United.

=== Stoke City ===
Telford joined Stoke City in July 2015 along with Blackpool teammate Mark Waddington. In August 2017 Telford joined League One side Bristol Rovers on loan for the 2017–18 season. He scored his first goals for Bristol Rovers when he scored twice in an EFL Trophy tie against Wycombe Wanderers on 29 August 2017. Telford played 24 times for Rovers scoring five goals as they finished in 13th position.

=== Bury ===
Telford joined Bury on a two-year contract in July 2018. While being used mainly from the substitutes bench during league games he became a regular starter in this seasons Checkatrade cup. This led him to the top of the goalscoring charts and earning the nickname "Mr Checkatrade".

=== Plymouth Argyle ===
On 11 July 2019, Telford joined up with Ryan Lowe, who had been his manager at Bury, by signing for Plymouth Argyle.

=== Newport County ===
On 28 January 2021, Telford joined League Two side Newport County on a permanent 18-month contract. He made his Newport debut in the 2–1 defeat against Harrogate Town in League Two on 30 January 2021 as a second-half substitute. He scored his first goal for Newport in the 1–1 League Two draw against Exeter City on 16 February 2021.

After an impressive month which saw him score eight goals in just six matches, Telford was awarded the EFL League Two Player of the Month Award for October 2021. A further four goals in four matches saw Telford receive the award for a second successive month. On 29 January 2022, Telford scored both goals as Newport defeated Barrow 2–1. This took his league goals tally to 20 for the season, becoming the first Newport player to hit this target in the top four divisions since John Aldridge in the 1983–84 season. In April 2022 Telford and Newport County teammate Finn Azaz were named in the EFL League Two team of the season. Telford finished the 2021–22 season as the top scorer in League Two with 25 league goals. In June 2022 Telford was named in the PFA Team of the Year. Newport offered Telford a contract extension but on 17 June 2022 Telford announced his decision to leave the club.

=== Crawley Town ===
On 24 June 2022, League Two club Crawley Town announced that Telford would join the club on a three-year contract upon the expiration of his contract at Newport County. He made his Crawley debut in their 1–0 away loss to Carlisle United on 30 July 2022. He scored his first Crawley goal in their 3–2 win over Stockport County. In a vital game for Crawley’s League Two survival hopes away to Hartlepool on 22 April 2023, Telford scored both goals in a 2-0 win with the second strike winning Crawley’s goal of the season for the 2022/23 campaign.

=== Barrow ===
On 25 August 2023, Telford signed a two-year deal with EFL League Two side Barrow.

On 31 January 2025, he joined National League side Barnet on loan for the remainder of the season, where he was part of the squad that won the league title.

He was released by Barrow at the end of the 2024–25 season.

=== Gateshead ===
On 25 July 2025, Telford joined National League side Gateshead on a two-year deal.

=== Return to Bury ===
On 17 October 2026, Telford returned to Northern Premier League Premier Division club Bury, seven years after departing the club following a title-winning season.

== Career statistics ==
As of 16 October 2026

Appearances and goals by club, season and competition
Club	Season	League			FA Cup		EFL Cup		Other		Total	
Club	Season	Division	Apps	Goals	Apps	Goals	Apps	Goals	Apps	Goals	Apps	Goals
Blackpool	2014–15	Championship	14	1	1	0	0	0	—		15	1
Stoke City	2015–16	Premier League	0	0	0	0	0	0	—		0	0
Stoke City U23	2016–17	—	—		—		—		1 (Note: Appearance(s) in EFL Trophy)	0	1	0
Bristol Rovers (loan)	2017–18	League One	19	3	1	0	1	0	3	2	24	5
Bury	2018–19	League Two	38	6	2	1	1	0	7	7	48	14
Plymouth Argyle	2019–20	League Two	19	2	3	0	1	1	0	0	23	3
Plymouth Argyle	2020–21	League One	16	1	3	0	2	0	3	1	24	2
Plymouth Argyle	Total		35	3	6	0	3	1	3	1	47	5
Newport County	2020–21	League Two	15	1	—		—		—		15	1
Newport County	2021–22	League Two	37	25	1	0	1	0	1	1	40	26
Newport County	Total		52	26	1	0	1	0	1	1	55	27
Crawley Town	2022–23	League Two	43	12	1	0	1	1	2	2	47	15
Crawley Town	2023–24	League Two	4	0	0	0	0	0	0	0	4	0
Crawley Town	Total		47	12	1	0	1	1	2	2	51	15
Barrow	2023–24	League Two	38	4	2	0	0	0	1	0	41	4
Barrow	2024–25	League Two	16	1	1	0	3	0	3	1	23	2
Barrow	Total		54	5	3	0	3	0	4	1	64	6
Barnet (loan)	2024–25	National League	15	3	0	0	0	0	0	0	15	3
Gateshead	2025–26	National League	16	2	2	1	—		3 (Note: One appearance in FA Trophy, two appearances and one goal in National League Cup)	1	21	4
Gateshead	2026–27	National League	2	0	0	0	—		1 (Note: Appearance(s) in National League Cup)	0	3	0
Gateshead	Total		18	2	2	1	0	0	4	1	24	5
Career total			292	61	17	2	10	2	25	15	344	81

== Honours ==
Bury

- EFL League Two second-place promotion: 2018–19

Plymouth Argyle

- EFL League Two third-place promotion: 2019–20

Barnet

- National League: 2024–25

Individual

- EFL League Two Player of the Month: October 2021, November 2021
- EFL League Two Team of the Season: 2021–22
- EFL League Two Top Scorer: 2021–22
- PFA Team of the Year: 2021–22 EFL League Two
