= Alex Henshall =

English footballer

Personal information
- Full name: Alex Charles Henshall
- Date of birth: 15 February 1994 (age 32)
- Place of birth: Swindon, England
- Height: 5 ft 10 in (1.77 m)
- Position: Winger

Team information
- Current team: Devizes Town

Youth career
- 2002–2010: Swindon Town
- 2010–2013: Manchester City

Senior career*
Years	Team	Apps	(Gls)
2009–2010	Swindon Town	0	(0)
2013–2014	Manchester City	0	(0)
2013	→ Chesterfield (loan)	7	(0)
2013	→ Bristol Rovers (loan)	2	(1)
2014	→ Ipswich Town (loan)	0	(0)
2014–2016	Ipswich Town	4	(0)
2015	→ Blackpool (loan)	2	(0)
2016	Kilmarnock	2	(0)
2016–2017	Margate	1	(0)
2017	Braintree Town	7	(0)
2017–2018	Nuneaton Town	6	(1)
2018–2019	Darlington	24	(0)
2019–2020	Nuneaton Borough	10	(1)
2019	→ Swindon Supermarine (loan)	2	(1)
2020	Swindon Supermarine	4	(0)
2020	Stratford Town	1	(0)
2020–2021	Banbury United	5	(1)
2021–2022	Wantage Town	18	(1)
2022–2024	Melksham Town	21	(5)
2024	→ Devizes Town (dual-registration)	9	(2)
2025–	Devizes Town	30	(5)

International career
2009–2010	England U16	3	(0)
2009–2011	England U17	16	(1)
- * Club domestic league appearances and goals as of 21:39, 18 April 2026 (UTC)

Alex Charles Henshall (born 15 February 1994) is an English footballer who plays as a winger for Hellenic League Premier Division club Devizes Town.

Henshall began his football career with hometown club Swindon Town before joining Manchester City as a 16-year-old. He spent spells on loan with Chesterfield, for whom he made his Football League debut, Bristol Rovers and Ipswich Town before signing a permanent contract with the latter in 2014. A loan to Blackpool preceded a couple of months with Scottish Premiership club Kilmarnock in 2016. He then played non-league football with Margate, Braintree Town, Nuneaton Town and Darlington before returning to Nuneaton in 2019.

He represented England at the 2011 European Under-17 Championships and at the 2011 FIFA U-17 World Cup.

== Club career ==
=== Swindon Town ===
Henshall was born and raised in Swindon, Wiltshire, and joined the youth setup of his hometown Football League club, Swindon Town, at the age of eight. He was a member of the Swindon Town team that reached the quarter-final of the 2009 Milk Cup Junior Section, scoring a hat-trick against Maccabi Tel Aviv's youngsters, and shared the Player of the Tournament award with Hallam Hope of eventual winners Everton. Swindon manager Danny Wilson named him among the substitutes for a Football League Trophy match against Exeter City in October 2009, and had hoped to bring him on if Swindon were "comfortable", but the match went to extra time and penalties: had Henshall come on, he would have become the club's youngest debutant, at 15 years, 233 days.

=== Manchester City ===
He attracted attention from major Premier League clubs, and in June 2010, once he finished school, he signed for Manchester City for an undisclosed fee. He made a positive start to his City career, winning the penalty that began an 8–0 rout of Empor Berlin by City's under-18 team in a pre-season tour of Germany in July 2010. City coach Scott Sellars said that Henshall "was a real threat – he looks like a real talent". He appeared for City's under-19s in both seasons of the NextGen Series before going out on loan.

==== Chesterfield (loan) ====
After reported interest in January 2013 from Coventry City in taking Henshall came to nothing, he joined Chesterfield on 22 February on a one-month loan deal. He made his club and Football League debut the next day, replacing Jay O'Shea in the 53rd minute of a 1–0 defeat at home to League Two leaders Gillingham. He made his first start three days later in a goalless draw with Aldershot Town, and was replaced at half-time by Jack Lester. On 28 March, his loan deal was extended until the end of the season.

==== Bristol Rovers (loan) ====
On 17 October 2013, Henshall signed on a month's loan for Bristol Rovers of League Two. According to Rovers manager John Ward, Henshall "[came] looking for an opportunity to get his career going again". Manchester City had high hopes for him, and the ambitious Henshall hoped to use the loan spell to "ignite his career in the Premier League". Ward described him as "quite direct in his play and [liking] to run at defenders." He made his debut two days later, replacing Ryan Brunt in the 63rd minute of a 1–0 defeat at home to Wycombe Wanderers. In the following game, on 22 October, he scored his first senior goal in a 2–1 defeat away to Accrington Stanley. That was his last appearance for Rovers: Ward thought "he was not going to force his way into [his] team."

=== Ipswich Town ===
Henshall joined Championship club Ipswich Town on 24 March 2014 on a youth loan until the end of the season. He was released by Manchester City when his contract expired. Despite having made no first-team appearances during his loan spell, Henshall joined Ipswich Town on a two-year contract on 27 June 2014. He said it was an easy decision because he liked working for manager Mick McCarthy and felt the club was making good progress. He made his debut on 12 August, starting in a League Cup match which Ipswich lost 1–0 to League One team Crawley Town in extra time.

Having made five appearances for Ipswich, Henshall joined their Championship rivals Blackpool on 9 January 2015 on loan for a month. He made his Blackpool debut the next day as a 61st-minute substitute for Connor Oliver in a 1–0 win over Millwall. After one more appearance, Henshall returned to his parent club after suffering a knee injury. At the end of the season, McCarthy said that although he felt Henshall should have been in the first-team squad more often, he had shown a positive attitude and the opportunity was still there. By September, he had been made available for transfer, and at the end of the January transfer window, his contract was terminated by mutual consent.

=== Kilmarnock ===
On 30 March 2016, Henshall signed for Scottish Premiership club Kilmarnock, agreeing a contract until the end of the season. He played just twice, and was released at the end of his contract.

=== Non-league football ===
Having turned down options "thinking [he] would get something better", Henshall went into the 2016–17 season without a club. He trained with Yeovil Town to maintain his fitness, and in December 2016 joined up with Margate. He played just one National League South match, against Welling United, before moving up a division by signing for Braintree Town in early January 2017. In what remained of the season, he made seven National League appearances, all but one off the bench, and another three in the FA Trophy.

In June 2017, Henshall signed for Nuneaton Town of the National League North. Manager Tommy Wright said he was excited not only about the player's "reputation and pedigree" but also because he wanted "to be the manager that gets this talent and potential back out of him so that he can hit the heights he should have done by now." Henshall made six league starts in the first couple of months of the campaign, but his season was disrupted by injury, worsened by what Wright later described as a misdiagnosis, and he left the club before his contract ended.

After Henshall returned to fitness ahead of the 2018–19 season, Wright continued his mission by signing him for his new employers, National League North club Darlington, citing "unfinished business". He made 24 league appearances without scoring, and was released at the end of the season, after which he signed for Nuneaton Borough of the Southern League Premier Division Central. On 27 November 2019, he joined Swindon Supermarine on a month's loan until 28 December. On 3 January 2020, he signed permanently with Swindon Supermarine and his contract with Nuneaton was terminated. In the curtailed 2020–21 season he played for Southern League Premier Division sides Stratford Town and Banbury United for short spells. In the summer of 2021 he dropped down to Division One Central to play for Wantage Town. In December 2022, Henshall signed for Melksham Town.

In January 2024, Henshall joined Devizes Town on dual-registration terms with Melksham Town. Having ruptured his achilles in pre-season with the club that ruled him out for the entirety of the 2024–25 season, he returned to the club for the 2025–26 season, winning the Western League Division One title.

== International career ==
Henshall made his England under-16 debut on 15 October 2009, in a 1–0 win against Wales, and appeared twice more at that level. He made his debut for the under-17 team on 3 August 2010, in a 5–0 win against Finland in the first round of the Nordic Tournament. England beat Sweden 2–1 in the final, in which Henshall played 67 minutes before being substituted. He scored his first goal for the side on 27 February 2011, in a 2–2 draw with host nation Portugal in the Algarve tournament.

He played in all of England's games at the 2011 UEFA Under-17 Championships, helping them reach the semi-finals. He also represented England at the 2011 FIFA U-17 World Cup, playing in the final group-stage game, a 2–0 win against Uruguay, and helping England to reach the quarter-final stage.

== Career statistics ==
As of match played 27 April 2019

Club	Season	League			FA Cup		League Cup (Note: Includes Football League Cup/EFL Cup, Southern League Cup)		Other		Total	
Club	Season	Division	Apps	Goals	Apps	Goals	Apps	Goals	Apps	Goals	Apps	Goals
Swindon Town	2009–10	League One	0	0	0	0	0	0	0	0	0	0
Manchester City	2012–13	Premier League	0	0	0	0	0	0	0	0	0	0
Manchester City	2013–14	Premier League	0	0	0	0	0	0	0	0	0	0
Manchester City	Total		0	0	0	0	0	0	0	0	0	0
Chesterfield (loan)	2012–13	League Two	7	0	—		—		—		7	0
Bristol Rovers (loan)	2013–14	League Two	2	1	—		—		—		2	1
Ipswich Town (loan)	2013–14	Championship	0	0	0	0	0	0	—		0	0
Ipswich Town	2014–15	Championship	4	0	0	0	1	0	—		5	0
Ipswich Town	2015–16	Championship	0	0	0	0	0	0	—		0	0
Ipswich Town	Total		4	0	0	0	1	0	—		5	0
Blackpool (loan)	2014–15	Championship	2	0	—		—		—		2	0
Kilmarnock	2015–16	Scottish Premiership	2	0	—		—		0	0	2	0
Margate	2016–17	National League South	1	0	—		—		—		1	0
Braintree Town	2016–17	National League	7	0	—		—		3 (Note: Appearances in FA Trophy)	0	10	0
Nuneaton Town	2017–18	National League North	6	1	2	0	—		0	0	8	1
Darlington	2018–19	National League North	24	0	1	0	—		1	0	26	0
Nuneaton Borough	2019–20	Southern League Prem. Div. Central	0	0	0	0	0	0	0	0	0	0
Career total			55	2	3	0	1	0	4	0	63	2

== Honours ==
Devizes Town

- Western League Division One: 2025–26
