= Connor Oliver =

English footballer

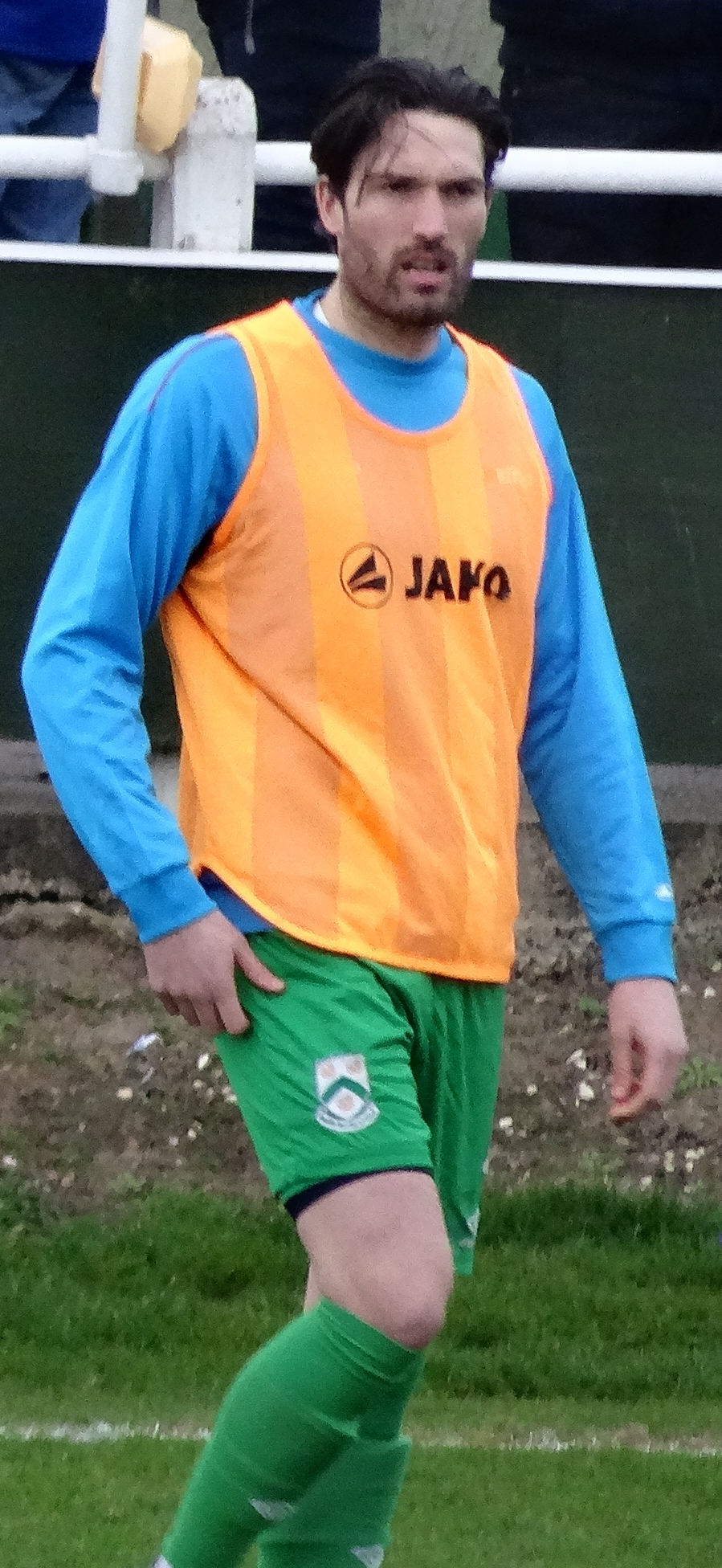
- Oliver warming up for North Ferriby United in 2017

Personal information
- Full name: Connor Oliver
- Date of birth: 17 January 1994 (age 32)
- Place of birth: Newcastle, England
- Positions: Defender; midfielder

Youth career
- –2012: Sunderland

Senior career*
Years	Team	Apps	(Gls)
2012–2015	Sunderland	0	(0)
2014	→ Hartlepool United (loan)	3	(0)
2015–2016	Blackpool	10	(0)
2016	→ Morecambe (loan)	5	(0)
2016–2017	North Ferriby United	33	(1)
2017–2018	FC Halifax Town	31	(0)
2018–2019	Blyth Spartans	35	(1)
2019–2020	Gateshead	23	(3)
2020–2022	Morpeth Town	24	(1)
2022–2023	North Shields	34	(5)
2023–2025	Newcastle Blue Star	54	(9)
- * Club domestic league appearances and goals as of 21:55, 11 October 2025 (UTC)

Connor Oliver (born 17 January 1994) is an English Retired professional footballer who was last seen as a defender or a midfielder for Newcastle Blue Star.

== Career ==
Oliver was born in Newcastle, Tyne and Wear. He began his career with Sunderland and then progressed through youth teams before joining Hartlepool United on loan in March 2014. He made his professional debut on 12 April 2014 in a 2–1 defeat against Chesterfield.

On 9 January 2015, Oliver signed for Blackpool on an 18-month contract. After Neil McDonald became the new manager at Blackpool, Oliver saw limited game time and in March 2016 was loaned out to League Two club Morecambe for the rest of the season, debuting off the bench at halftime against Plymouth on 26 March.

Oliver signed for newly promoted National League club North Ferriby United on 25 July 2016.

In August 2018, Oliver joined Blyth Spartans. He played for the club until 13 June 2019, where he joined Gateshead.

On 4 August 2020, Oliver signed for Morpeth Town.

On 29 June 2022, Oliver signed for North Shields.

On 22 December 2023, Oliver signed for Newcastle Blue Star as part of the swap deals with North Shields.

He retired from Football on 11 October 2025 at the age of 31 and is now a financial planner with Oliver Financial LTD.

== Career statistics ==
As of match played 5 August 2023

Appearances and goals by club, season and competition
Club	Season	League			FA Cup		League Cup		Other		Total	
Club	Season	Division	Apps	Goals	Apps	Goals	Apps	Goals	Apps	Goals	Apps	Goals
Hartlepool United (loan)	2013–14	League Two	3	0	0	0	0	0	0	0	3	0
Blackpool	2014–15	Championship	6	0	0	0	0	0	—		6	0
Blackpool	2015–16	League One	4	0	1	0	1	0	2 (Note: Appearances in the Football League Trophy)	0	8	0
Blackpool	Total		10	0	1	0	1	0	2	0	14	0
Morecambe (loan)	2015–16	League Two	5	0	—		—		—		5	0
North Ferriby United	2016–17	National League	33	1	1	0	—		1 (Note: Appearance in the FA Trophy)	0	35	1
FC Halifax Town	2017–18	National League	31	0	1	0	—		1	0	33	0
Blyth Spartans	2018–19	National League North	35	1	1	0	—		3	0	39	1
Gateshead	2019–20	National League North	23	3	1	0	—		0	0	24	3
Morpeth Town	2020–21	NPL Premier Division	4	0	1	0	—		2	0	7	0
Morpeth Town	2021–22	NPL Premier Division	20	1	2	0	—		4	0	26	1
Morpeth Town	Total		24	1	3	0	0	0	6	0	33	1
rowspan="3"North Shields	2022–23	NPL East Division	27	4	3	0	—		3	1	33	5
2023–24	NPL East Division	0	0	1	0	—		0	0	1	0	
Total		27	4	4	0	0	0	3	1	34	5	
Career total			191	10	12	0	1	0	16	1	220	10
