= Anderson Banvo =

Ivorian footballer (born 1994)

Personal information
- Full name: Aka Anderson Banvo Amon
- Date of birth: 4 February 1994 (age 32)
- Place of birth: Romainville, France
- Height: 1.90 m (6 ft 3 in)
- Position: Forward

Team information
- Current team: Les Herbiers
- Number: 7

Youth career
- Paris Saint-Germain

Senior career*
Years	Team	Apps	(Gls)
2011–2012	Paris Saint-Germain B	2	(0)
2012–2014	Blackpool	0	(0)
2014	→ Stevenage (loan)	1	(0)
2015	Vereya	3	(0)
2016	Paris FC II	3	(0)
2016	Boulogne II	7	(0)
2016	Boulogne	1	(0)
2017–2018	Martigues	15	(4)
2018–2019	Drancy	13	(2)
2019–2020	Martigues	17	(7)
2020–2021	Annecy	8	(0)
2021–	Les Herbiers	14	(1)

International career
2010–2011	Ivory Coast U17	4	(1)
- * Club domestic league appearances and goals as of 23:42, 29 April 2022 (UTC)

Aka Anderson Banvo (born 4 February 1994) is a professional footballer who plays as a forward for Championnat National 1 club Les Herbiers. Born in France, he is a former Ivory Coast youth international.

== Club career ==
Having progressed through his youth career at Paris Saint-Germain and scored 27 goals for the reserve side, Banvo was released by the club and then went on trial at Blackpool. Blackpool soon became keen on signing Banvo. Banvo signed with Blackpool in August 2012. Upon the move, Banvo was given number twenty-nine shirt for the club. Blackpool opted to take up their option of a contract extension that would ensure Banvo remained under contract for the 2013–14 season.

Banvo was loaned out to Stevenage, lying in last place in League One, on 27 March 2014. He made his debut in the Football League two days later, coming on as an 80th-minute substitute for Filipe Morais in a 1–1 draw with Port Vale at Broadhall Way. After making his only appearance at Stevenage, it announced that Banvo was released by the club after they decided not to offer a new contract.

On 4 February 2015, Banvo signed with Bulgarian side Vereya.

After spells at Paris FC II, Boulogne, Martigues, Drancy, and then a return to Martigues, Banvo signed for Annecy on 30 May 2020, who were just promoted to the Championnat National, France's third division. In 2021, he signed for Championnat National 2 side Les Herbiers.

== Career statistics ==
As of match played 16 April 2022

Appearances by club, season and competition
Club	Season	League			National Cup		Other (Note: Includes other competitive competitions, including the EFL Cup and the Football League Trophy.)		Total	
Club	Season	Division	Apps	Goals	Apps	Goals	Apps	Goals	Apps	Goals
Paris Saint-Germain B	2011–12	CFA	2	0	—		—		2	0
Blackpool	2013–14	Championship	0	0	0	0	0	0	0	0
Stevenage (loan)	2013–14	League One	1	0	0	0	0	0	1	0
Vereya	2014–15	B Group	3	0	0	0	0	0	3	0
Paris FC II	2015–16	CFA 2	3	0	—		—		3	0
Boulogne II	2016–17	CFA 2	7	0	—		—		7	0
Boulogne	2016–17	National	1	0	0	0	—		1	0
Martigues	2017–18	National 2	15	4	1	0	—		16	4
Drancy	2018–19	National	13	2	1	0	—		14	2
Martigues	2019–20	National 2	17	7	0	0	—		17	7
Annecy	2020–21	National	8	0	0	0	—		8	0
Les Herbiers	2021–22	National 2	14	1	2	0	—		16	1
Career total			84	14	4	0	0	0	88	14
