= Joël Dielna =

French footballer (born 1990)

Personal information
- Full name: Joël David Lionel Dielna
- Date of birth: 27 December 1990 (age 35)
- Place of birth: Sainte-Rose, Guadeloupe
- Height: 1.82 m (6 ft 0 in)
- Position: Full-back

Senior career*
Years	Team	Apps	(Gls)
2008–2010	Caen B	20	(1)
2010–2011	Guingamp B	17	(4)
2011–2012	Vannes B	5	(1)
2012–2014	Vannes	17	(0)
2014–2015	Blackpool	2	(0)
2016	Gerena	-	(-)
2016	Solihull Moors	4	(0)
2017	AFC Telford United	12	(0)
2017–2018	Nuneaton Town		
2018–2019	Hereford	1	(0)
2019	→ Oxford City	7	(0)
- * Club domestic league appearances and goals as of 12:05, 01 February 2019 (UTC)

Joël David Lionel Dielna (born 27 December 1990) is a French footballer who plays as a defender.

== Career ==
He signed for Blackpool on 12 August 2014 and made his first-team debut for the club the same day as a 56th-minute substitute in a League Cup fixture against Shrewsbury Town.

In September 2017 he signed for Nuneaton Town. He got sent off on his debut.

On 30 November 2018, he signed for Hereford, arriving from Nuneaton. He joined Oxford City on an initial one month loan on 1 February 2019.

== Career statistics ==
Club performance			League		Cup		Continental		Other		Total	
Season	Club	League	Apps	Goals	Apps	Goals	Apps	Goals	Apps	Goals	Apps	Goals
France			League		Coupe de France		Europe				Total	
2008–09	Caen B	CFA	7	1	–		–		–		7	1
2009–10	Caen B	CFA	13	0	–		–		–		13	0
2010–11	Guingamp B	CFA2	17	4	–		–		–		17	4
2011–12	Vannes B	CFA2	5	1	–		–		–		5	1
2012–13	Vannes	National	5	0	0	0	–		–		5	0
2013–14	Vannes	National	12	0	1	0	–		–		13	0
England			League		FA Cup		Europe		League Cup		Total	
2014–15	Blackpool	Championship	2	0	0	0	–		1	0	3	0
Country	France		59	6	1	0	–		–		60	6
Country	England		2	0	0	0	–		1	0	3	0
Country	Total		61	6	1	0	–		1	0	63	6
