= Jeffrey Rentmeister =

Belgian football manager (born 1984)

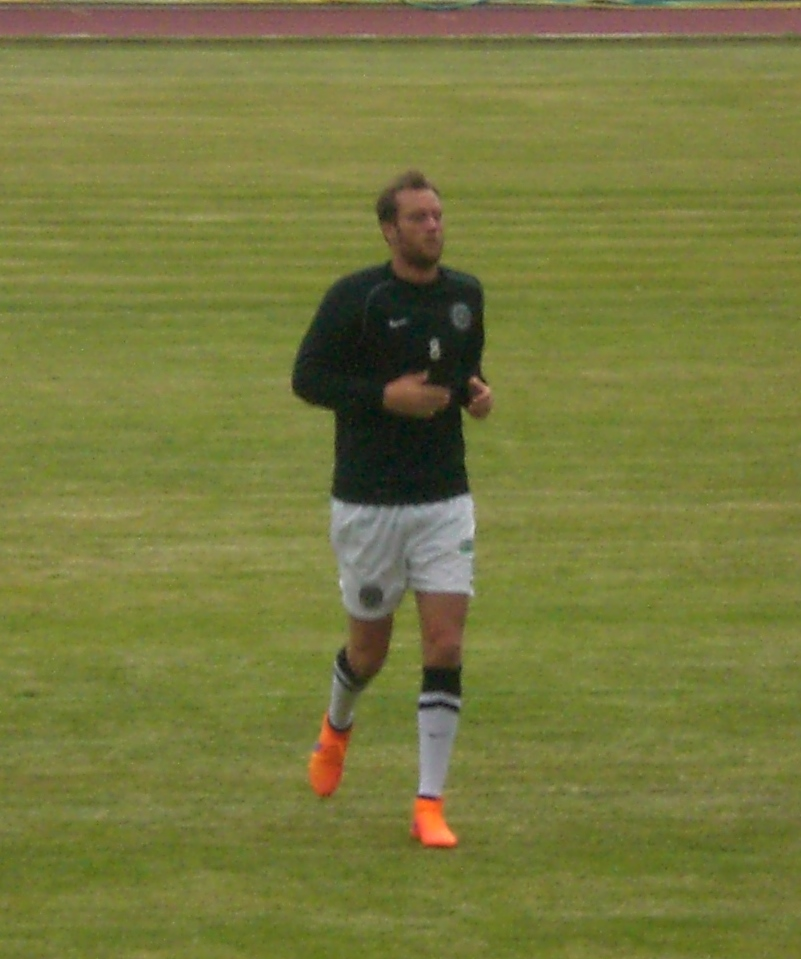
- Rentmeister with White Star Brussels in 2015

Personal information
- Date of birth: 11 July 1984 (age 42)
- Place of birth: Oupeye, Belgium
- Height: 1.90 m (6 ft 3 in)
- Position: Centre-back

Team information
- Current team: Union Rochefortoise (head coach)

Youth career
- 1989–2000: RFC Liège
- 2000–2003: Eupen

Senior career*
Years	Team	Apps	(Gls)
2003–2008	Eupen	145	(4)
2008–2010	Beveren	56	(12)
2010–2011	F91 Dudelange	20	(2)
2012	Visé	23	(1)
2013–2014	Westerlo	32	(1)
2014–2015	Blackpool	8	(0)
2015	White Star Brussels	0	(0)
2015–2016	Seraing	7	(1)
2016	Sporting Hasselt	22	(1)
2017	Thes Sport	0	(0)
2017–2018	RFCB Sprimont	25	(1)
2018–2020	Patro Eisden	29	(0)
2020–2022	Union Rochefortoise		
Total		367+	(23+)

Managerial career
- 2023–: Union Rochefortoise
- * Club domestic league appearances and goals

Jeffrey Rentmeister (born 11 July 1984) is a Belgian football manager and former player who is the head coach of Belgian Division 1 club Union Rochefortoise.

As a player, he spent the majority of his career in Belgium, with additional spells in Luxembourg and England, primarily operating as a central defender. After retiring from professional football, he moved into coaching and sporting management, and since 2022 has served as both sporting director and head coach of Union Rochefortoise, guiding the club to successive promotions within the Belgian football league system.

== Playing career ==
Born in Oupeye, Liège Province, Belgium, Rentmeister began his football education at RFC Liège, progressing through the club's youth system before moving to Eupen in 2000 to complete his development. He was promoted to Eupen's first team in 2003, at a time when the club competed in the Belgian Second Division.

Rentmeister made his senior debut on 13 September 2003 against Eendracht Aalst, appearing as a late substitute. He featured sixteen times during the 2003–04 season, largely from the bench, before establishing himself as a regular starter in the following campaign. Over five seasons with Eupen, he developed into a consistent presence in defence, making more than 140 appearances in all competitions.

In 2008, he signed for Beveren, where he remained a first-choice centre-back. During his two seasons at the club, he scored 12 goals in 56 league matches, an unusually high tally for a defender. Beveren's bankruptcy and subsequent merger with Red Star Waasland in 2010 brought his spell at the club to an end.

Later in 2010, Rentmeister joined F91 Dudelange, managed by Marc Grosjean, with whom he had previously worked at Eupen. Although he was not a regular starter, he was part of the squad that won both the Luxembourg National Division and the Luxembourg Cup, completing a domestic double. He also made appearances during the early qualifying rounds of the 2011–12 UEFA Champions League.

Rentmeister returned to Belgium in January 2012, signing for Visé. After two half-seasons, he moved to Westerlo, where he contributed to the club's promotion campaign. Although his appearances were limited following promotion to the Belgian First Division, he made his top-flight debut during the 2014–15 season.

On 12 August 2014, Rentmeister signed a one-year contract with Blackpool, with an option for an additional season, reuniting with manager José Riga. He made his debut the same day in the League Cup against Shrewsbury Town. Following Riga's dismissal, his opportunities became limited. In February 2015, he was tried for drunk driving and, after failing to appear in court, an arrest warrant was issued. He was sentenced three weeks later to a driving ban and a fine. Blackpool did not renew his contract at the end of the season.

Rentmeister returned to Belgium in mid-2015, signing a two-year contract with White Star Brussels. The contract was terminated by mutual agreement on 31 August 2015. On 9 October, he signed with Seraing, following a trial period with the club.

At the end of the season, he joined Sporting Hasselt in the third-tier Belgian First Amateur Division. After the club was relegated at the end of the season, Rentmeister moved between several sides at the fourth-tier level, including Thes Sport and RFCB Sprimont.

In 2018, he joined Patro Eisden, where he played a key role in the club's title-winning 2018–19 Belgian Second Amateur Division campaign and promotion to the third tier.

In January 2020, Rentmeister signed for Union Rochefortoise, where he also assumed responsibilities as sporting director. He retired from playing at the conclusion of the 2021–22 season.

== Coaching and managerial career ==
Rentmeister gained early coaching experience in November 2016, when he was appointed assistant coach of Royal Antwerp while still registered as a player with Sporting Hasselt. His tenure lasted only one week, as the entire coaching staff was dismissed by club management.

Following the dismissal of head coach Yannick Pauletti in October 2022, Rentmeister was appointed interim head coach of Union Rochefortoise. Two weeks later, the club confirmed him as head coach until the end of the season.

Under his leadership, Union Rochefortoise won the 2022–23 Belgian Third Division ACFF B title, securing promotion. The club followed this success by finishing runners-up in the 2023–24 Second Division ACFF, earning promotion for a second consecutive season. Throughout this period, Rentmeister continued to combine the roles of head coach and sporting director.
