= 2017 Harrisburg City Islanders season =

Harrisburg City Islanders
2017 season
- Owner: Eric Pettis
- Head coach: Bill Becher
- Stadium: FNB Field
- USL: 11th place
- USL Playoffs: Did not qualify
- U.S. Open Cup: Fourth round
- Top goalscorer: League: Ropapa Mensah (7); All: Ropapa Mensah (7)
- Highest home attendance: League: 3,289 (7/15 vs. RIC)
- Lowest home attendance: League: 1,820 (9/12 vs. CIN)
- Average home league attendance: League: 2,429
- Biggest win: League: HAR 2–0 NY (7/12); HAR 2–0 STL (9/30); All: REA 0–3 HAR (5/31, USOC)
- Biggest defeat: League/All: LOU 5–0 HAR (8/23)
Home colors	Away colors

The 2017 season was the Harrisburg City Islanders's 14th season of competitive soccer - its first in the second division of American soccer, and its seventh season in the United Soccer League.

This was the club's final season under its original name, with the club renamed Penn FC (in full, Penn Football Club) shortly after the end of the season.

== Review ==
For the 2017 season, the City Islanders played all their home matches at FNB Field rather than splitting time between Harrisburg and Clipper Magazine Stadium in Lancaster. This decision was made to focus on marketing the team more intently in Harrisburg area.

The 2017 season marked the first time the City Islanders competed in the second division of American soccer after USL was granted provisional Division II status.

The season would also kick off under new majority ownership joined by George Altirs of Capelli Sports. The new ownership has intended to invest in the club to keep up with the growing league and keep the team in Harrisburg. Despite additional investment and club connections to Ghanaian club, International Allies F.C., the City Islanders failed to make the playoffs for the third consecutive season.

At the conclusion of the season, it was announced that the Harrisburg City Islanders would be re-branded as Penn FC for the 2018 season marking the end of the "City Islanders" name after 14 seasons.

== Roster ==
No.	Position	Nation	Player
1	GK	USA	Nick Noble
2	DF	USA	Griffin Libhart
4	DF	USA	Travis Brent
5	DF	BRA	Tiago Calvano
7	FW	PUR	Manolo Sanchez
8	MF	SEN	Mouhamed Dabo
9	MF	COL	Jonny Mendoza
10	MF	JAM	Paul Wilson
11	FW	USA	Aaron Wheeler
12	MF	NGA	Rasheed Olabiyi
13	FW	USA	Mike Olla
14	MF	USA	Danny DiPrima
15	DF	USA	Lee Nishanian
16	DF	USA	Jake Bond
17	DF	USA	Jamie Thomas
18	DF	GHA	Abass Mohamed (on loan from Inter Allies)
19	MF	JAM	Cardel Benbow
20	DF	USA	Chris Hill
21	GK	USA	Sean Lewis
22	DF	USA	John Grosh
23	DF	USA	Shawn McLaws
25	FW	GHA	Ropapa Mensah (on loan from Inter Allies)
30	FW	BRA	Pedro Ribeiro
33	GK	USA	Brandon Miller
60	FW	GHA	Fredrick Yamoah Opoku (on loan from Inter Allies)

Updated as of July 21, 2017.

== Transfers ==
=== In ===
Date	Player	Number	Position	Previous club	Fee/notes
February 23, 2017	(United States) Lee Nishanian	15	DF	(United States) LA Galaxy II	Free; 1-year contract
February 24, 2017	(United States) Chris Hill	20	DF	(United States) Villanova Wildcats	Signed
March 1, 2017	(Colombia) Jonny Mendoza	9	MF	(United States) Orlando City B	Signed
March 2, 2017	(United States) Travis Brent	4	DF	(Netherlands) Almere City FC	Signed
March 9, 2017	(United States) Brandon Miller	33	GK	(United States) Orange County Blues	Signed
March 16, 2017	(United States) John Grosh	22	MF	(United States) Drexel University	Signed
March 16, 2017	(United States) Mike Olla	13	FW	(United States) Montclair State University	Signed
March 16, 2017	(United States) Jake Bond	16	DF	(United States) Saint Louis FC	Signed
March 16, 2017	(United States) Griffin Libhart	2	DF	(United States) West Virginia University	Signed
March 21, 2017	(Puerto Rico) Manolo Sanchez	7	MF	(United States) San Antonio FC	Signed
March 21, 2017	(Nigeria) Rasheed Olabiyi	12	MF	(United States) Houston Dynamo	Signed
March 23, 2017	(Brazil) Tiago Calvano	5	DF	(United States) Minnesota United FC	Signed
March 23, 2017	(United States) Sean Lewis	21	GK	(United States) Jacksonville Armada	Signed
April 14, 2017	(Brazil) Pedro Ribeiro	30	FW	(United States) Orlando City SC	Signed
July 21, 2017	(Germany) Jason Plumhoff	6	FW	(United States) Indy Eleven	Signed

=== Out ===
Date	Player	Number	Position	New club	Fee/notes
November 12, 2016	(Barbados) Keasel Broome	30	GK	(United States) Pittsburgh Riverhounds	Undisclosed
November 23, 2016	(United States) Shane Campbell	2	DF	(United States) Pittsburgh Riverhounds	Undisclosed
December 5, 2016	(Isle of Man) Liam Doyle	16	DF	(United States) Swope Park Rangers	Transfer
January 1, 2017	(Jamaica) Craig Foster	22	FW	(Jamaica) FC Reno	Free Transfer
January 26, 2017	(Spain) Jose Barril	8	MF	(United States) Oklahoma City Energy FC	Transfer
February 20, 2017	(United States) Garret Pettis	9	FW		Retired
February 28, 2017	(United States) Cameron Vickers	77	FW	(United States) Reno 1868 FC	Undisclosed

=== Loan in ===
Date	Player	Number	Position	Loaned from	Fee/notes
March 23, 2017	(Ghana) Abass Mohamed	18	DF	(Ghana) International Allies F.C.	Signed
March 23, 2017	(Ghana) Ropapa Mensah	25	FW	(Ghana) International Allies F.C.	Signed
May 5, 2017	(Ghana) Fredrick Yamoah Opoku	60	FW	(Ghana) International Allies F.C.	Signed

== Competitions ==
=== Preseason ===
February 26 Preseason	Lehigh University	0–1	Harrisburg City Islanders	Bethlehem, Pennsylvania
12:00 PM		Report	Galvao	Stadium: Ulrich Sports Complex

March 3 Preseason	Long Island University	1–1	Harrisburg City Islanders	Tinton Falls, New Jersey
4:30 PM	Goal	Report	Wheeler	Stadium: Capelli Sport Complex

March 5 Preseason	Harrisburg City Islanders	1–1	UMBC	Hummelstown, Pennsylvania
2:00 PM	Bond	Report	Goal	Stadium: Lower Dauphin Middle School

March 8 Preseason	New York Red Bulls II	1–1	Harrisburg City Islanders	Whippany, New Jersey
1:00 PM	Valot 64'	Report	Wheeler 85' (pen.)	Stadium: New York Red Bulls Training Facility

March 12 Preseason	Harrisburg City Islanders	5–1	Binghamton University	Millersville, Pennsylvania
6:00 PM	Wilson; Olla; Olabiyi Sanchez	Report	Goal	Stadium: Pucillo Field

March 16 Preseason	Bethlehem Steel FC	1–1	Harrisburg City Islanders	Wayne, Pennsylvania
11:00 a.m. EST	Chambers	Report	Goal	Stadium: YSC Academy

=== USL ===
==== Standings (Eastern Conference) ====
Pos	Team	Pld	W	D	L	GF	GA	GD	Pts	Qualification
1	Louisville City FC (C)	32	18	8	6	58	31	+27	62	Conference Playoffs
2	Charleston Battery	32	15	9	8	53	33	+20	54	Conference Playoffs
3	Tampa Bay Rowdies	32	14	11	7	50	35	+15	53	Conference Playoffs
4	Rochester Rhinos	32	14	11	7	36	28	+8	53	Conference Playoffs
5	Charlotte Independence	32	13	9	10	52	40	+12	48	Conference Playoffs
6	FC Cincinnati	32	12	10	10	46	48	−2	46	Conference Playoffs
7	New York Red Bulls II	32	13	5	14	57	60	−3	44	Conference Playoffs
8	Bethlehem Steel FC	32	12	8	12	46	45	+1	44	Conference Playoffs
9	Orlando City B	32	10	12	10	37	36	+1	42	
10	Ottawa Fury	32	8	14	10	42	41	+1	38	
11	Harrisburg City Islanders	32	10	7	15	28	47	−19	37	
12	Saint Louis FC	32	9	9	14	35	48	−13	36	
13	Pittsburgh Riverhounds	32	8	12	12	33	42	−9	36	
14	Richmond Kickers	32	8	8	16	24	36	−12	32	
15	Toronto FC II	32	6	7	19	27	54	−27	25	

Source: 2017 USL standings
Rules for classification: 1) total wins; 2) total goal differential; 3) total goals scored; 4) points earned against top four Conference finishers; 5) disciplinary points; 6) coin toss or drawing of lots
(C) Champions

==== Results ====
All times in Eastern Time.

March 25 1	Richmond Kickers	1–0	Harrisburg City Islanders	Richmond, Virginia
17:00 EDT	Shanosky 51'; Troyer (yellow card) 66'; Kamara (yellow card) 79'	Report	Benbow (yellow card) 85'	Stadium: City Stadium; Attendance: 8,021; Referee: Jose Carlos Rivero

April 5 2	New York Red Bulls II	0–1	Harrisburg City Islanders	Harrison, New Jersey
19:00 EDT	Bezecourt (yellow card) 56'; Metzger (yellow card) 87'	Report; Box Score	Mohamed (yellow card) 25'; Sanchez 62'; Thomas (yellow card) 66'	Stadium: Red Bull Arena; Attendance: 396; Referee: Alex Chilowicz

April 15 3	Harrisburg City Islanders	3–2	Bethlehem Steel FC	Harrisburg, Pennsylvania
19:00 EDT	Wheeler 9'; Wilson 21'; Thomas (yellow card) 72'; Benbow 90'	Report; Box Score	Moar 38'; Wijnaldum (yellow card) 61'; Nanco 64'	Stadium: FNB Field; Attendance: 3,264; Referee: Brandon Smith

April 18 4	Harrisburg City Islanders	1–1	Orlando City B	Harrisburg, Pennsylvania
18:30 EDT	Calvano 80'; Thomas (yellow card) 90+1'	Report; Box Score	Sane (yellow card) 9'; Martz (yellow card) 45+1'; Carroll 90+3'	Stadium: FNB Field; Attendance: 2,013; Referee: Jorge Ramírez

April 29 5	Pittsburgh Riverhounds	1–0	Harrisburg City Islanders	Pittsburgh, Pennsylvania
19:00 EDT	Greenspan (yellow card) 45+1'; Washington (yellow card) 58'; Howell (yellow card) 72'; Hertzog 75'	Report; Box Score	Mohamed (yellow card) 40' (yellow-red card); Olabiyi (yellow card) 45+3'; Calvano (yellow card) 84'; Miller (red card) 90+5'	Stadium: Highmark Stadium; Attendance: 2,513; Referee: Calin Radosav

May 6 6	New York Red Bulls II	3–1	Harrisburg City Islanders	Montclair, New Jersey
16:00 EDT	Allen 26' (pen.), 57' (pen.); Bilyeu (yellow card) 50'; Martínez 79'	Report; Box Score	Noble (yellow card) 25'; Wheeler 39'	Stadium: MSU Soccer Park; Referee: Henrik Karlsson

May 13 7	Richmond Kickers	0–0	Harrisburg City Islanders	Richmond, Virginia
19:00 EDT	Lee (yellow card) 26'; Sekyere (yellow card) 35'	Report; Box Score	Mensah (yellow card) 88'	Stadium: City Stadium; Attendance: 3,903; Referee: Kevin Broadley

May 20 8	Harrisburg City Islanders	2–2	Charleston Battery	Harrisburg, Pennsylvania
19:00 EDT	Olabiyi 23'; Dabo (yellow card) 45'; Nishanian (yellow card) 75'; Ribeiro (yellow card) 82'; Mendoza 90+5'	Report; Box Score	Anunga (yellow card) 33' (yellow-red card) 53'; Guerra (yellow card) 38' (goal) 68'; Lasso (yellow card) 41'; Mueller (yellow card) 56'; Williams 68'	Stadium: FNB Field; Attendance: 2,829; Referee: Luis Guardia

May 24 9	Harrisburg City Islanders	0–0	Pittsburgh Riverhounds	Harrisburg, Pennsylvania
18:30 EDT	Dabo (yellow card) 29'; Ribeiro (yellow card) 47'	Report; Box Score		Stadium: FNB Field; Attendance: 2,061; Referee: Charles Murphy

May 28 10	Bethlehem Steel FC	3–1	Harrisburg City Islanders	Bethlehem, Pennsylvania
17:00 EDT	Chambers 39'; Conneh 49'; Real (yellow card) 79'; Burke (yellow card) 82' (goal) 90+3' (pen.)	Report; Box Score	DiPrima 80'	Stadium: Goodman Stadium; Attendance: 3,066; Referee: Lorant Varga

June 10 11	Ottawa Fury FC	1–0	Harrisburg City Islanders	Ottawa, Ontario
19:00 EDT	Obasi (yellow card) 32'; Seoane 55'	Report; Box Score	Nishanian (yellow card) 34'; Mohamed (yellow card) 74'; McLaws (yellow card) 78'	Stadium: TD Place Stadium; Attendance: 4,770; Referee: Marie-Soleil Beaudoin

June 17 12	Charlotte Independence	2–0	Harrisburg City Islanders	Matthews, North Carolina
19:00 EDT	Hererra 13', 61'	Report; Box Score	Nishanian (yellow card) 74'; Thomas (yellow card) 81'	Stadium: Mecklenburg County Sportsplex; Attendance: 2,648; Referee: Dustin Thorne

June 20 13	Harrisburg City Islanders	0–1	Bethlehem Steel FC	Harrisburg, Pennsylvania
19:00 EDT	Nishanian (red card) 80'	Report; Box Score	Chambers 54'; Wijnaldum (yellow card) 76'	Stadium: FNB Field; Attendance: 2,314; Referee: Jorge Ramírez

June 24 14	Harrisburg City Islanders	1–0	Louisville City FC	Harrisburg, Pennsylvania
	Dabo (yellow card) 24'; Calvano (yellow card) 41'; Ribeiro 53' (yellow card) 56'; Thomas (yellow card) 69'	Report; Box Score		Stadium: FNB Field; Attendance: 2,678; Referee: Gustavo Solorio

July 1 15	Toronto FC II	3–4	Harrisburg City Islanders	Vaughan, Ontario
17:00 EDT	Fraser (yellow card) 15'; Taintor 28'; Uccello 35'; Andrews 74'	Report; Box Score	Ribeiro 23'; Bond 31'; Aubrey 48' (o.g.); Wilson 58'; Calvano (yellow card) 60'; Thomas (yellow card) 78'	Stadium: Ontario Soccer Centre; Attendance: 165; Referee: Yusri Rudolf

July 8 16	Rochester Rhinos	1–0	Harrisburg City Islanders	Rochester, New York
18:05 EDT	Madison (yellow card) 35'; Graf 85'	Report; Box Score		Stadium: Capelli Sport Stadium; Attendance: 2,178; Referee: Ismir Pekmic

July 12 17	Harrisburg City Islanders	2–0	New York Red Bulls II	Harrisburg, Pennsylvania
19:00 EDT	Thomas 20' (yellow card) 73'; Calvano (yellow card) 23'; Wilson 41'; Dabo (yellow card) 55'; Mohamed (yellow card) 86'	Report; Box Score	Bartley (yellow card) 84'	Stadium: FNB Field; Attendance: 1,840; Referee: Jaroslaw Werel

July 15 18	Harrisburg City Islanders	1–0	Richmond Kickers	Harrisburg, Pennsylvania
19:00 EDT	Mohamed (yellow card) 16'; Wilson (yellow card) 63'; Calvano (yellow card) 71'; Mensah 76'	Report; Box Score		Stadium: FNB Field; Attendance: 3,289; Referee: Brandon Smith

July 18 19	Harrisburg City Islanders	1–1	Charlotte Independence	Harrisburg, Pennsylvania
19:00 EDT	Mensah 45+3'; McLaws (yellow card) 60'; Olabiyi (yellow card) 90+2'	Report; Box Score	Herrera 51'	Stadium: FNB Field; Attendance: 1,856; Referee: Charles Murphy

July 26 20	FC Cincinnati	3–0	Harrisburg City Islanders	Cincinnati, Ohio
19:00 EDT	Fall 32'; Konig 70'; McLaughlin 85'	Report; Box Score	Thomas (yellow card) 62'; DiPrima (yellow card) 85'	Stadium: Nippert Stadium; Attendance: 18,334; Referee: Jorge Ramírez

August 2 21	Orlando City B	0–0	Harrisburg City Islanders	Orlando, Florida
19:30 EDT		Report; Box Score	Calvano (yellow card) 51'	Stadium: Orlando City Stadium; Attendance: 1,061; Referee: Jonathan Weiner

August 5 22	Tampa Bay Rowdies	3–0	Harrisburg City Islanders	St. Petersburg, Florida
19:30 EDT	Collins 15'; Paterson 73'; Restrepo 90'	Report; Box Score	Brent (yellow card) 60'; Olabiyi (yellow card) 90+4'	Stadium: Al Lang Stadium; Referee: Jonathan Bilinski

August 8 23	Harrisburg City Islanders	0–1	Rochester Rhinos	Harrisburg, Pennsylvania
19:30 EDT	Grosh (yellow card) 20'; Brent (yellow card) 59'; Mensah (yellow card) 83'	Report; Box Score	Madison 25'; Garzi (yellow card) 44'	Stadium: FNB Field; Attendance: 2,078; Referee: Amber O'Connor

August 12 24	Harrisburg City Islanders	0–3	Pittsburgh Riverhounds	Harrisburg, Pennsylvania
19:30 EDT	Mensah (yellow card) 41'; Thomas (yellow card) 61'; Nishanian (yellow card) 75'; Wilson (yellow card) 87'	Report; Box Score	Parkes 28'; Walsh 54', 76'	Stadium: FNB Field; Attendance: 3,367; Referee: Luis Arroyo

August 23 25	Louisville City FC	5–0	Harrisburg City Islanders	Louisville, Kentucky
19:30 EDT	Kaye 11'; Ilic 13'; DelPiccolo 27'; McCabe 67'; Totsch 90+1'	Report; Box Score	Mensah (yellow card) 29'; McLaws (yellow card) 56'; Calvano (yellow card) 75'	Stadium: Louisville Slugger Field; Attendance: 6,763; Referee: Aaron Hernandez

September 6 26	Harrisburg City Islanders	2–3	Tampa Bay Rowdies	Harrisburg, Pennsylvania
18:30 EDT	Dabo (yellow card) 9'; Nishanian 31'; Mensah 45'; Benbow (yellow card) 51'; Opoku (yellow card) 51'; Mendoza (yellow card) 67'; Calvano (yellow card) 89'	Report; Box Score	Hristov 36', 68' (pen.) (yellow card) 57'; Paterson 38'; Chavez (yellow card) 75'	Stadium: FNB Field; Attendance: 1,856; Referee: Bardhyl Pashaj

September 9 27	Saint Louis FC	1–2	Harrisburg City Islanders	Fenton, Missouri
20:30 EDT	Charpie (yellow card) 50'; Plewa (yellow card) 59'; Mirković (yellow card) 60'; Volesky 70'	Report; Box Score	Bond 32'; Ribeiro (yellow card) 72' (goal) 90+3'	Stadium: Marshall Wireless Stadium; Attendance: 4,133; Referee: Rosendo Mendoza

September 12 28	Harrisburg City Islanders	1–1	FC Cincinnati	Harrisburg, Pennsylvania
18:30 EDT	Brent (yellow card) 18'; McLaws (yellow card) 48'; Mendoza 51'; Miller (yellow card) 89'; Mensah (yellow card) 90+5'	Report; Box Score	Dacres (yellow card) 56'; McLaughlin 90+6'	Stadium: FNB Field; Attendance: 1,820; Referee: Jaroslaw Werel

September 16 29	Harrisburg City Islanders	2–1	Toronto FC II	Harrisburg, Pennsylvania
19:00 EDT	Calvano (yellow card) 35'; Opoku (yellow card) 39'; Bond (yellow card) 42'; Mensah 45+2', 50'; Wheeler (yellow card) 90+4'	Report; Box Score	Hundal 14'; Romeo (yellow card) 91'	Stadium: FNB Field; Attendance: 2,775; Referee: Gustavo Solorio

September 27 30	Harrisburg City Islanders	1–0	Ottawa Fury FC	Harrisburg, Pennsylvania
18:30 EDT	Benbow (red card) 40'; Mensah 46'; McLaws (yellow card) 51'; Wilson (yellow card) 56'; Grosh (yellow card) 91'	Report; Box Score	Campbell (yellow card) 85'	Stadium: FNB Field; Attendance: 1,806; Referee: Calin Radosav

September 30 31	Harrisburg City Islanders	2–0	Saint Louis FC	Harrisburg, Pennsylvania
19:00 EDT	Sanchez 4'; Dabo (yellow card) 20'; Calvano (yellow card) 51'; Ribeiro (yellow card) 54'; Mensah 75' (yellow card) 88'	Report; Box Score	Appiah (yellow card) 38'; Mirković (yellow card) 88'	Stadium: FNB Field; Attendance: 3,017; Referee: Daniel Gutierrez

October 7 32	Charleston Battery	4–0	Harrisburg City Islanders	Charleston, South Carolina
19:00 EDT	Cordoves 15', 58' van Schaik (yellow card) 19'; Guerra 28'; Griffith 89' (yellow card) 89'	Report; Box Score	Olabiyi (yellow card) 36'; Brent (yellow card) 82'	Stadium: MUSC Health Stadium; Attendance: 4,170; Referee: David Erbacher

2017 Harrisburg City Islanders Regular Season Schedule

==== Results summary ====
Overall								Home						Away					
Pld	Pts	W	L	T	GF	GA	GD	W	L	T	GF	GA	GD	W	L	T	GF	GA	GD
32	37	10	15	7	28	47	−19	7	4	5	19	16	+3	3	11	2	9	31	−22

Last updated: December 2, 2017
Source: 2017 USL season
Pld = Matches played; Pts = Points; W = Matches won; T = Matches tied; L = Matches lost; GF = Goals for; GA = Goals against; GD = Goal difference

Round	1	2	3	4	5	6	7	8	9	10	11	12	13	14	15	16	17	18	19	20	21	22	23	24	25	26	27	28	29	30	31	32
Stadium	A	A	H	H	A	A	A	H	H	A	A	A	H	H	A	A	H	H	H	A	A	A	H	H	A	H	A	H	H	H	H	A
Result	L	W	W	T	L	L	T	T	T	L	L	L	L	W	W	L	W	W	T	L	T	L	L	L	L	W	T	W	W	W	W	L
Position	14	8	7	7	10	10	12	11	10	13	13	15	15	13	12	12	8	9	8	10	10	11	11	13	13	13	13	10	10	10	10	11

Updated to match(es) played on December 2, 2017. Source: 2017 USL season and Current USL Standing
A = Away; H = Home; W = Win; L = Loss; T = Tie

=== U.S. Open Cup ===
The City Islanders competed in the 2017 edition of the U.S. Open Cup, entering the competition in the second round. They were eliminated in the fourth round to the Philadelphia Union for the second consecutive year.

As of June 3, 2017

All times in Eastern Time.

May 17 Second Round	Ocean City Nor'easters (New Jersey)	0–0 (a.e.t.) (5–6 p)	(Pennsylvania) Harrisburg City Islanders	Ocean City, New Jersey
17:00 EDT	(yellow card) 80'	HCI Report; OCN Report	Miller (yellow card) 45'	Stadium: Carey Stadium
	Penalties
	Simovic (penalty scored); Neto (penalty scored); Mompremier (penalty scored); Colmer (penalty missed) (penalty scored); Hemmings (penalty missed)		(penalty missed) Ribeiro; (penalty scored) McLaws; (penalty scored) Wheeler; (penalty scored) DiPrima; (penalty scored) Nishanian; (penalty scored) Dabo

May 31 Third Round	Reading United AC (Pennsylvania)	0–3	(Pennsylvania) Harrisburg City Islanders	Reading, Pennsylvania
EDT		Report	DiPrima 8' (yellow card) 24'; Bond 16', 50'; Ribeiro (yellow card) 67'	Stadium: Shirk Stadium

June 14 Fourth Round	Philadelphia Union (Pennsylvania)	3–1	(Pennsylvania) Harrisburg City Islanders	Chester, Pennsylvania
EDT	Jones 18'; Sapong 33'; Epps 47'	Report; Box Score	Mendoza 37'; Ribeiro (yellow card) 41'; Mohamed (yellow card) 67'; Bond (yellow card) 85'	Stadium: Talen Energy Stadium

== Statistics ==
As of December 3, 2017.

Players included in matchday squads
No.	Pos.	Nat.	Name	League		Playoffs		Cup		Total		Discipline	
No.	Pos.	Nat.	Name	Apps	Goals	Apps	Goals	Apps	Goals	Apps	Goals	A yellow rectangle, denoting the yellow penalty card shown to a player being cautioned	A red rectangle, denoting the red penalty card shown to a player being sent off
2	DF	(United States)	Griffin Libhart	0	0	0	0	1	0	1	0	0	0
4	DF	(United States)	Travis Brent	21	0	0	0	2	0	23	0	0	0
5	DF	(Brazil)	Tiago Calvano	26	1	0	0	0	0	26	1	11	0
7	FW	(Puerto Rico)	Manolo Sanchez	10	2	0	0	1	0	11	2	0	0
8	MF	(Senegal)	Mouhamed Dabo	21	0	0	0	3	0	24	0	6	0
9	MF	(Colombia)	Jonny Mendoza	23	2	0	0	2	1	25	3	1	0
10	MF	(Jamaica)	Paul Wilson	28	3	0	0	1	0	29	3	3	0
11	FW	(United States)	Aaron Wheeler	14	2	0	0	1	0	15	2	1	0
12	MF	(Nigeria)	Rasheed Olabiyi	27	1	0	0	2	0	29	1	4	0
13	FW	(United States)	Mike Olla	12	0	0	0	1	0	13	0	0	0
14	MF	(United States)	Danny DiPrima	23	1	0	0	3	1	26	2	1	0
15	DF	(United States)	Lee Nishanian	25	1	0	0	3	0	28	1	4	1
16	DF	(United States)	Jake Bond	14	2	0	0	3	2	17	4	1	0
17	DF	(United States)	Jamie Thomas	20	0	0	0	3	0	23	0	7	1
18	DF	(Ghana)	Abass Mohamed	20	0	0	0	3	0	23	0	7	1
19	MF	(Jamaica)	Cardel Benbow	21	1	0	0	1	0	22	1	2	0
20	DF	(United States)	Chris Hill	1	0	0	0	0	0	1	0	0	0
22	DF	(United States)	John Grosh	21	0	0	0	2	0	23	0	3	0
23	DF	(United States)	Shawn McLaws	27	0	0	0	3	0	30	0	5	0
25	FW	(Ghana)	Ropapa Mensah	19	7	0	0	0	0	19	7	6	0
30	FW	(Brazil)	Pedro Ribeiro	19	3	0	0	3	0	22	3	5	0
60	FW	(Ghana)	Fredrick Opoku	15	0	0	0	1	0	16	0	2	0
Total											31	71	2

Players with names struck through and marked † left the club during the playing season.
Players with names in italics were loaned players.
Players with names marked * were on loan from another club for the whole of their season with Harrisburg.
League denotes USL regular season
Playoffs denotes USL playoffs

=== Goalkeepers ===
==== League Stats ====
As of December 3, 2017.

Players included in matchday squads
Nat.	No.	Player	Apps	Starts	Record	GA	GAA	SO	Booked	Sent off (straight red)
(United States)	1	Nick Noble	1	1	0-1-0	3	3.00	0	1	0
(United States)	21	Sean Lewis	6	6	2-3-1	9	1.50	2	0	0
(United States)	33	Brandon Miller	25	25	9-11-5	35	1.40	7	1	1
Total					11–15–6	47	1.47	9	2	1

Record: W-L-D

==== U.S. Open Cup Stats ====
As of June 24, 2017.

Players included in matchday squads
Nat.	No.	Player	Apps	Starts	Record	GA	GAA	SO	Booked	Sent off (straight red)
(United States)	1	Nick Noble	0	0	0-0-0	0	0.00	0	0	0
(United States)	21	Sean Lewis	2	2	1-1-0	3	1.50	1	0	0
(United States)	33	Brandon Miller	1	1	1-0-0	0	0.00	1	0	0
Total					2–1–0	3	1.00	0	0	0

Record: W-L-D

== Honors ==
- Week 9 Team of the Week: Honorable Mention M Rasheed Olabiyi
- Week 14 Team of the Week: Honorable Mention F Pedro Ribeiro
- Week 15 Player of the Week: F Pedro Ribeiro
- Week 17 Team of the Week: G Brandon Miller and M Mouhamed Dabo
  Honorable Mention M Ropapa Mensah
- Week 17 Goal of the Week: M Ropapa Mensah
- Week 18 Team of the Week: Honorable Mention G Brandon Miller
