= 2017 Tampa Bay Rowdies season =

Tampa Bay Rowdies
2017 season
- Chairman: Bill Edwards
- Head coach: Stuart Campbell
- Stadium: Al Lang Stadium
- USL: 3rd (Eastern Conference)
- USL Cup: Conference Semifinals
- U.S. Open Cup: Third Round
- Top goalscorer: League: Georgi Hristov (13); All: Georgi Hristov (15)
- Highest home attendance: 7,786 (sellout) (Sep 23 vs. Charlotte)
- Lowest home attendance: League: 4,326 (Apr 1 vs. Toronto II); All: 2,490 (May 16 vs. Jacksonville U23)
- Average home league attendance: League: 5,663; All: 5,345
Home colors	Away colors	Third colors

The 2017 Tampa Bay Rowdies season was the club's eighth season of existence, and their first in the United Soccer League. Including the previous Tampa Bay Rowdies, this was the 24th season of a franchise in the Tampa Bay metro area with the Rowdies moniker. Including the now-defunct Tampa Bay Mutiny, this was the 30th season of professional soccer in the Tampa Bay region.

== Club ==
=== Roster ===
As of September 24, 2017

No.	Position	Nation	Player
1	GK	JAM	Nico Campbell
2	DF	USA	Darnell King
3	DF	SCO	Neill Collins
4	MF	GER	Marcel Schäfer
7	FW	USA	Darwin Jones
8	MF	COL	Wálter Restrepo
9	MF	USA	Alex Morrell
10	FW	BUL	Georgi Hristov
11	MF	BRA	Leo Fernandes
13	MF	USA	Justin Chavez
14	DF	ENG	Luke Boden
15	DF	USA	Zac Portillos
17	DF	ENG	Tamika Mkandawire
18	GK	USA	Matt Pickens
19	FW	NIR	Martin Paterson
21	MF	URU	Sebastián Guenzatti
22	MF	USA	Keith Savage
23	MF	USA	Michael Nanchoff
26	MF	ENG	Joe Cole (captain)
27	DF	USA	Hunter Gorskie
31	DF	JAM	Damion Lowe
32	MF	DEN	Martin Vingaard
50	GK	USA	Akira Fitzgerald
90	DF	CAN	Kyle Porter

=== Technical staff ===
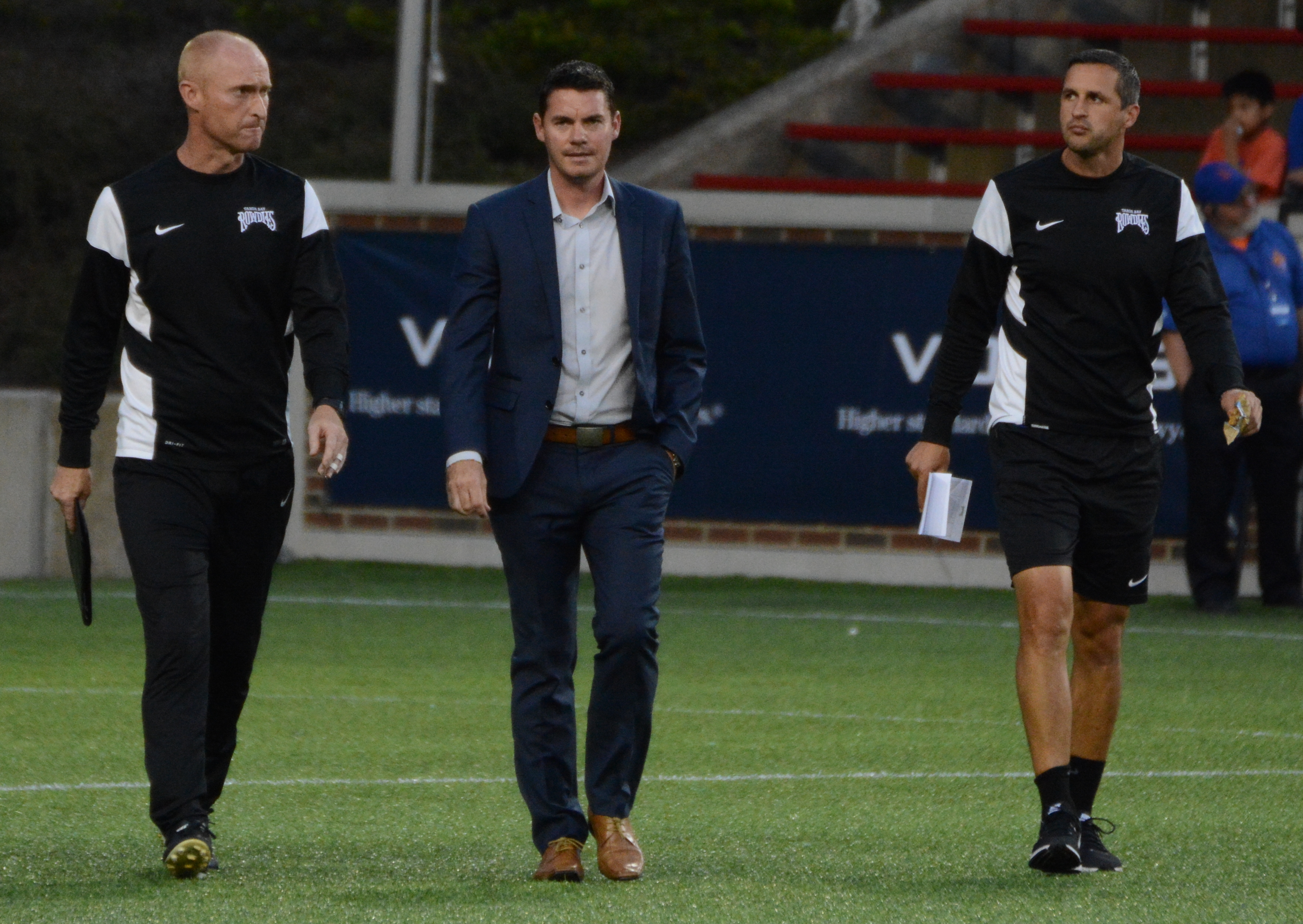
Stuart Dobson, Stuart Campbell, and Raoul Voss

- (Scotland) Stuart Campbell – Head coach
- (Germany) Raoul Voss – Assistant coach
- (England) Stuart Dobson – Goalkeeper coach
- (United States) Cheyne Roberts – Rowdies 2 head coach
- (United States) Ryan Spurr – Director of Team Operations
- (United States) Jason Riley – Strength and conditioning coach
- (United States) Dr. Koco Eaton – Team physician/orthopedic surgeon
- (United States) Dr. Sanjay Menon – Team physician/orthopedic surgeon
- (United States) Dr. Christopher Salud – Team physician

=== Front office ===
- (United States) Bill Edwards – Chairman, chief executive officer and governor
- (United States) Andrew Nestor – Director
- (United States) David Laxer – Director
- (United States) Lee Cohen – Vice president and chief operating officer

== Competitions ==
=== Preseason ===
The Rowdies began their preseason by co-hosting and participating in the 2017 Florida Cup. Tampa Bay also hosted Major League Soccer teams in the Suncoast Invitational for the second year in a row.

January 8, 2017 Florida Cup	Tampa Bay Rowdies (United States)	0–2	(Germany) VfL Wolfsburg	St. Petersburg
16:45 EST (UTC−5)	Vingaard (yellow card) 61'	Report; TBR Report Archived September 30, 2020, at the Wayback Machine	Herrmann 6', 41'	Stadium: Al Lang Stadium; Referee: Jonathan Wener

January 14, 2017 Florida Cup	Tampa Bay Rowdies (United States)	0–2	(Brazil) Atlético Mineiro	St. Petersburg
16:00 EST (UTC−5)	Nanchoff (yellow card) 29'; Vingaard (yellow card) 45'; Boden (yellow card) 68'	Report; TBR Report Archived April 20, 2018, at the Wayback Machine	Leonan 6'; Rodrigão 52'; Ananias (yellow card) 53'	Stadium: Al Lang Stadium

February 11, 2017 Scrimmage	Orlando City SC	0–0	Tampa Bay Rowdies	Sanford
11:00 EST (UTC−5)		Quote Sheet Archived November 12, 2020, at the Wayback Machine		Stadium: Sylvan Lake Park; Attendance: Closed-door

February 18, 2017 Suncoast Invitational	Tampa Bay Rowdies	0–1	Philadelphia Union	St. Petersburg
19:30 EST (UTC−5)	Mkandawire (yellow card) 55'; Collins (red card) 84'; Carr (yellow card) 88'	TBR Report Archived September 19, 2021, at the Wayback Machine; Report B	Tribbett (yellow card) 61'; Jones (yellow card) 71', (goal) 73'	Stadium: Al Lang Stadium

February 25, 2017 Suncoast Invitational	Tampa Bay Rowdies	2–1	Montreal Impact	St. Petersburg
19:30 EST (UTC−5)	Cole 34'; Brown 40'; Hristov (yellow card) 74'; Porter (yellow card) 75'; Vingaard (yellow card) 77'; Boden (yellow card) 85'	TBR Report Archived September 30, 2020, at the Wayback Machine; Report B	Piatti 71' (pen.); Cabrera (yellow card) 89'	Stadium: Al Lang Stadium

March 4, 2017 FitzFest	Tampa Spartans	0–1	Tampa Bay Rowdies	Tampa
= EST (UTC−5)		Report	Paterson 88' (Morrell)	Stadium: Pepin Stadium

March 11, 2017 Friendly	Jacksonville Armada FC	1–0	Tampa Bay Rowdies	Jacksonville
14:00 EST (UTC−5)	Banks 48'; Blake (yellow card) 64'	Report	Lowe (yellow card) 25'; Nanchoff (yellow card) 58'	Stadium: Patton Park

March 18, 2017 Friendly	Miami FC	3–0	Tampa Bay Rowdies	Miami Gardens
11:00 EST (UTC−5)	Pinho 67'; Pinho 68' (Poku); Rennella 75' (pen.)	Report		Stadium: St. Thomas University

=== USL ===
The Rowdies completed the USL regular season in third place on the Eastern Conference table with 53 points. This was one point behind the second place, Charleston Battery, and nine behind table-toppers, Louisville City FC. Tampa Bay finished the season strongly, going unbeaten in their final seven matches, and losing only two of their final fifteen. Their top-four finish also guaranteed that they would host at least one playoff match.

==== USL Eastern Conference table ====
Pos	Team	Pld	W	D	L	GF	GA	GD	Pts	Qualification
1	Louisville City FC (C)	32	18	8	6	58	31	+27	62	Conference Playoffs
2	Charleston Battery	32	15	9	8	53	33	+20	54	Conference Playoffs
3	Tampa Bay Rowdies	32	14	11	7	50	35	+15	53	Conference Playoffs
4	Rochester Rhinos	32	14	11	7	36	28	+8	53	Conference Playoffs
5	Charlotte Independence	32	13	9	10	52	40	+12	48	Conference Playoffs
6	FC Cincinnati	32	12	10	10	46	48	−2	46	Conference Playoffs
7	New York Red Bulls II	32	13	5	14	57	60	−3	44	Conference Playoffs
8	Bethlehem Steel FC	32	12	8	12	46	45	+1	44	Conference Playoffs
9	Orlando City B	32	10	12	10	37	36	+1	42	
10	Ottawa Fury	32	8	14	10	42	41	+1	38	
11	Harrisburg City Islanders	32	10	7	15	28	47	−19	37	
12	Saint Louis FC	32	9	9	14	35	48	−13	36	
13	Pittsburgh Riverhounds	32	8	12	12	33	42	−9	36	
14	Richmond Kickers	32	8	8	16	24	36	−12	32	
15	Toronto FC II	32	6	7	19	27	54	−27	25	

Source: 2017 USL standings
Rules for classification: 1) total wins; 2) total goal differential; 3) total goals scored; 4) points earned against top four Conference finishers; 5) disciplinary points; 6) coin toss or drawing of lots
(C) Champions

==== Results summary ====
Overall								Home						Away					
Pld	W	D	L	GF	GA	GD	Pts	W	D	L	GF	GA	GD	W	D	L	GF	GA	GD
32	14	11	7	50	35	+15	53	10	5	1	27	10	+17	4	6	6	23	25	−2

Last updated: April 26, 2018.
Source: Match reports

==== Matches ====
March 25, 2017 1	Tampa Bay Rowdies	1–0	Orlando City B	St. Petersburg
19:30 EDT (UTC−4)	Hristov 57' (pen.), (yellow card) 60'	Report	Neal (yellow card) 36'; Cox (yellow card) 90+4'	Stadium: Al Lang Stadium; Attendance: 7,710; Referee: Ted Unkel

April 1, 2016 2	Tampa Bay Rowdies	4–0	Toronto FC II	St. Petersburg
19:30 EDT (UTC−4)	Lowe 12'; Hristov 20'; Cole 22'; Brown 70'	Report	Fraser (yellow card) 79'	Stadium: Al Lang Stadium; Attendance: 4,326; Referee: Caleb Mendez

April 8, 2017 3	Tampa Bay Rowdies	1–0	Ottawa Fury FC	St. Petersburg
19:30 EDT (UTC−4)	Hristov 47'; King (yellow card) 51'	Report	Campbell (yellow card) 50'; Obasi (yellow card) 83'	Stadium: Al Lang Stadium; Attendance: 5,310; Referee: Matthew Miscannon

April 15, 2017 4	Louisville City FC	2–1	Tampa Bay Rowdies	Louisville
19:30 EDT (UTC−4)	Davis 22', (yellow card) 31'; Spencer (yellow card) 45+5'; Smith (yellow card) 83'; Lancaster 87'	Report	Boden (yellow card) 57'; King (yellow card) 63'; Hristov (yellow card) 71'; Paterson 89'	Stadium: Louisville Slugger Field; Attendance: 9,074; Referee: Andrew Musashe

April 19, 2017 5	FC Cincinnati	1–1	Tampa Bay Rowdies	Cincinnati
19:00 EDT (UTC−4)	Delbridge 36'; Bahner (yellow card) 58'; Dacres (red card) 75'	Report	Schäfer 7'; Boden (yellow card) 20'; Nanchoff (yellow card) 65'; Lowe (yellow card) 70'	Stadium: Nippert Stadium; Attendance: 15,244; Referee: Jon Freemon

April 22, 2017 6	Tampa Bay Rowdies	2–3	Charleston Battery	St. Petersburg
19:30 EDT (UTC−4)	Cole 34'; Hristov 62', (yellow card) 90'	Report	Williams (yellow card) 38'; Lasso 40', (yellow card) 61'; Chang 45+2'; Woodbine (yellow card) 62'; Anunga 89'	Stadium: Al Lang Stadium; Attendance: 5,016; Referee: Jonathan Weiner

April 29, 2017 7	Tampa Bay Rowdies	1–0	Richmond Kickers	St. Petersburg
19:30 EDT (UTC−4)	Lowe (yellow card) 40'; Brown 45'	Report	Sekyere (yellow card) 88'	Stadium: Al Lang Stadium; Attendance: 4,829; Referee: Elvis Osmanovic

May 6, 2017 8	Ottawa Fury FC	0–0	Tampa Bay Rowdies	Ottawa
14:00 EDT (UTC−4)	Salazar (yellow card) 18'	Report	Hristov (yellow card) 18'; Chavez (yellow card) 29'; King (yellow card) 33'	Stadium: TD Place Stadium; Attendance: 3,840; Referee: Yusri Rudolf

May 13, 2017 9	Tampa Bay Rowdies	2–0	Louisville City FC	St. Petersburg
19:30 EDT (UTC−4)	King (yellow card) 46'; Hristov 59'; Lowe (yellow card) 70'; Brown 72'; Collins (yellow card) 73'; Schäfer (yellow card) 78'; Pickens (yellow card) 89'	Report	Craig (yellow card) 87'	Stadium: Al Lang Stadium; Attendance: 5,410; Referee: Guido Gonzalez

May 19, 2017 10	Toronto FC II	1–3	Tampa Bay Rowdies	Vaughan
17:00 EDT (UTC−4)	Uccello 10'; Aubrey (yellow card) 45'; Spencer (yellow card) 62'; Alseth (yellow card) 83'	Report	Schäfer (yellow card) 58'; Collins (yellow card) 63'; Cole 68'; Paterson 80'; Jones 82'; Nanchoff (yellow card) 87'	Stadium: Ontario Soccer Centre; Attendance: 551; Referee: Carol Anne Chenard

May 24, 2017 11	Rochester Rhinos	1–0	Tampa Bay Rowdies	Rochester
19:05 EDT (UTC−4)	Fall 24'; Garzi (yellow card) 39'	Report	Hristov (yellow card) 33'; Lowe (yellow card) 55'; Nanchoff (yellow card) 81'	Stadium: Capelli Sport Stadium; Attendance: 1,140; Referee: Matthew Franz

May 27, 2017 12	Tampa Bay Rowdies	1–1	Saint Louis FC	St. Petersburg
19:30 EDT (UTC−4)	Fernandes (yellow card) 6'; Morrell (yellow card) 39'; King (yellow card) 56'; Nanchoff (yellow card) 76'; Mkandawire (yellow card) 82'; Collins 87'	Report	Charpie (yellow card) 12'; Alihodžić (yellow card) 41'; Plewa (yellow card) 54'; Angulo 59'	Stadium: Al Lang Stadium; Attendance: 6,068; Referee: Danielle Chesky

June 4, 2017 13	Charlotte Independence	2–2	Tampa Bay Rowdies	Rock Hill
19:00 EDT (UTC−4)	Martínez (yellow card) 45+3'; Castillo 51', 56'	Report	Hristov 25' (pen.), (yellow card) 27'; Mkandawire (yellow card) 35'; Boden (yellow card) 71'; Savage 83', (yellow card) 86'	Stadium: Eagle Field; Attendance: 1,216; Referee: Dule Djurasevic

June 10, 2017 14	Tampa Bay Rowdies	1–1	Rochester Rhinos	St. Petersburg
19:30 EDT (UTC−4)	Cole 19'; Collins (yellow card) 28'; Savage (yellow card) 58'; Nanchoff (yellow card) 89'	Report	Graf 5'; Fall (yellow card) 68'; Kamdem (yellow card) 78'	Stadium: Al Lang Stadium; Attendance: 6,026; Referee: Kevin Broadley

June 17, 2017 15	Richmond Kickers	1–1	Tampa Bay Rowdies	Richmond
19:00 EDT (UTC−4)	Tayou 90+4'	Report	Boden (yellow card) 42'; Nanchoff (yellow card) 44'; Savage (yellow card) 60'; Schäfer 64'	Stadium: City Stadium; Attendance: 4,034; Referee: J.T. Alukonis

June 22, 2017 16	Pittsburgh Riverhounds	2–0	Tampa Bay Rowdies	Pittsburgh
19:00 EDT (UTC−4)	Walsh 11'; Parkes 88'	Report	Vingaard (yellow card) 55'	Stadium: Highmark Stadium; Attendance: 1,977; Referee: Mark Kadlecik

July 1, 2017 17	Charleston Battery	2–0	Tampa Bay Rowdies	Charleston
19:00 EDT (UTC−4)	Guerra (yellow card) 8'; Griffith (yellow card) 50'; Williams 70'; Cordovés 81'	Report	Lowe (yellow card) 55'; Boden (yellow card) 62'; Morrell (yellow card) 65'	Stadium: MUSC Health Stadium; Attendance: 2,967; Referee: Matthew Franz

July 6, 2017 18	Tampa Bay Rowdies	2–0	FC Cincinnati	St. Petersburg
20:00 EDT (UTC−4)	Paterson 39'; Cole 44'; Savage (yellow card) 69'; Mkandawire (yellow card) 90+2'	Report	Quinn (yellow card) 7'; Dacres (yellow card) 45+3'; McLaughlin (yellow card) 74'	Stadium: Al Lang Stadium; Attendance: 6,269; Referee: Jonathan Weiner

July 13, 2017 19	Orlando City B	1–1	Tampa Bay Rowdies	Orlando
19:30 EDT (UTC−4)	Pereira (yellow card) 74'; Clowes (yellow card) 90+2'; Deakin 90+6' (pen.); Laryea (yellow card) 90+7'	Report	Paterson 21'; King (yellow card) 43'; Morrell (yellow card) 45'	Stadium: Orlando City Stadium; Attendance: 1,504; Referee: Kevin Broadley

July 22, 2017 20	Tampa Bay Rowdies	2–0	Charleston Battery	St. Petersburg
19:30 EDT (UTC−4)	Mkandawire (yellow card) 25'; Cole 40'; Paterson 69'	Report		Stadium: Al Lang Stadium; Attendance: 5,619; Referee: Daniel Gutierrez

July 29, 2017 21	Tampa Bay Rowdies	2–0	Pittsburgh Riverhounds	St. Petersburg
19:30 EDT (UTC−4)	Mkandawire (yellow card) 3'; Morrell 11', 76'; Porter (yellow card) 67'; Pickens (yellow card) 75'	Report	Agbossoumonde (yellow card) 44'; Adewole (yellow card) 75'	Stadium: Al Lang Stadium; Attendance: 5,737; Referee: Rosendo Mendoza

August 5, 2017 22	Tampa Bay Rowdies	3–0	Harrisburg City Islanders	St. Petersburg
19:30 EDT (UTC−4)	Collins 15'; Paterson 73'; Restrepo 90'	Report	Grosh (yellow card) 51'; Brent (yellow card) 60'; Olabiyi (yellow card) 90+4'	Stadium: Al Lang Stadium; Attendance: 5,619; Referee: Jonathan Bilinski

August 13, 2017 23	Saint Louis FC	4–3	Tampa Bay Rowdies	Fenton
19:00 EDT (UTC−4)	Jackson 1'; Rudolph 5', 67'; Ledbetter (yellow card) 38'; Petosevic (yellow card) 68'; Plewa 89'	Report	Schäfer 10'; Hristov 16', (yellow card) 28'; Lowe (yellow card) 25' (yellow-red card) 85'; Paterson 36', (yellow card) 36'	Stadium: World Wide Technology Soccer Park; Attendance: 4,001; Referee: Gustavo Solorio

August 19, 2017 24	Tampa Bay Rowdies	1–1	Ottawa Fury FC	St. Petersburg
19:30 EDT (UTC−4)	Hristov 11'; Paterson (yellow card) 19'; Nanchoff (yellow card) 49'; Restrepo (yellow card) 90+3'	Report	Duba 4'; Manesio (yellow card) 72'; Lefèvre (yellow card) 90+1'	Stadium: Al Lang Stadium; Attendance: 6,710; Referee: Jonathan Weiner

September 2, 2017 25	New York Red Bulls II	4–2	Tampa Bay Rowdies	Montclair
16:00 EDT (UTC−4)	Tinari 17'; Powder 41'; Valot 54'; Flemmings 83'	Report	Hristov (yellow card) 5'; Paterson 20'; Porter (yellow card) 60'; Collins (yellow card) 63'; Gorskie 77', (yellow card) 77'	Stadium: MSU Soccer Park at Pittser Field; Attendance: 562; Referee: Jose Rivero

September 6, 2017 26	Harrisburg City Islanders	2–3	Tampa Bay Rowdies	Harrisburg
18:30 EDT (UTC−4)	Dabo (yellow card) 9'; Nishanian 31'; Mensah 45'; Benbow (yellow card) 51'; Opoku (yellow card) 58'; Mendoza (yellow card) 67'; Tiago (yellow card) 89'	Report	Hristov 36', (yellow card) 57', (goal) 68' (pen.); Paterson 38'; Chavez (yellow card) 75'	Stadium: FNB Field; Attendance: 1,856; Referee: Bardhyl Pashaj

September 23, 2017 27	Tampa Bay Rowdies	1–0	Charlotte Independence	St. Petersburg
19:30 EDT (UTC−4)	Gorskie 33'; Chavez (yellow card) 45+1'; Restrepo (yellow card) 75'; Guenzatti (yellow card) 83'; Nanchoff (yellow card) 90'	Report	Herrera (yellow card) 36'; Johnson (yellow card) 37'; Ekra (yellow card) 86'	Stadium: Al Lang Stadium; Attendance: 7,786; Referee: Rosendo Mendoza

September 27, 2017 28	Bethlehem Steel FC	2–2	Tampa Bay Rowdies	Bethlehem
15:00 EDT (UTC−4)	Moar (yellow card) 19'; Burke (yellow card) 38', (goal) 46'; D. Jones (yellow card) 55'; Trusty (yellow card) 65'; Conneh 78'	Report	Hristov (yellow card) 18', (goal) 36' (pen.); Gorskie 55'; King (yellow card) 90'	Stadium: Goodman Stadium; Attendance: 2,881; Referee: Jared Simons

September 30, 2017 29	Tampa Bay Rowdies	1–1	Bethlehem Steel FC	St. Petersburg
19:30 EDT (UTC−4)	Gorskie (yellow card) 29'; Cole (yellow card) 62'; Guenzatti 80'; Restrepo (yellow card) 90+4'	Report	Heard (yellow card) 26'; Conneh 56'; Samuel (yellow card) 58'; A. Jones (yellow card) 74'; McGuire (yellow card) 89'; Roberts (yellow card) 90+4'; Burke (yellow card) 90+6'	Stadium: Al Lang Stadium; Attendance: 6,611; Referee: Guido Gonzalez

October 4, 2017 30	Tampa Bay Rowdies	3–2	New York Red Bulls II	St. Petersburg
19:30 EDT (UTC−4)	Cole 18'; Vingaard (yellow card) 23'; Paterson 25', 45'	Report	Bonomo 16'; Scarlett (yellow card) 50' (yellow-red card) 63'; Flemmings 54', (yellow card) 84'	Stadium: Al Lang Stadium; Attendance: 5,260; Referee: Jonathan Weiner

October 7, 2017 31	San Antonio FC	1–1	Tampa Bay Rowdies	San Antonio
20:30 EDT (UTC−4)	Pecka (yellow card) 50'; Gordon (yellow card) 55'; O'Ojong (yellow card) 84'; Guzmán 88', (yellow card) 88'	Report	Hristov 69'; Restrepo (yellow card) 72'	Stadium: Toyota Field; Attendance: 7,043; Referee: Victor Rivas

October 12, 2017 32	Orlando City B	0–2	Tampa Bay Rowdies	Orlando
19:30 EDT (UTC−4)	da Silva (yellow card) 76'	Report	Vingaard (yellow card) 38'; Portillos (yellow card) 51'; Hristov 74'; Gorskie (yellow card) 80'; Guenzatti 90+3'	Stadium: Orlando City Stadium; Attendance: 1,185; Referee: Jonathan Bilinski

=== USL Cup playoffs ===
The Rowdies clinched their spot in the single elimination 2017 USL playoffs on October 4, with a 3–2 victory over New York Red Bulls II.

Conference Quarterfinals
October 20 – Louisville Slugger Field
#1 Louisville City FC	4
#8 Bethlehem Steel FC	0
October 21 – Capelli Sport Stadium
#4 Rochester Rhinos (a.e.t.)	2
#5 Charlotte Independence	1
October 21 – Al Lang Stadium
#3 Tampa Bay Rowdies	3
#6 FC Cincinnati	0
October 21 – MUSC Health Stadium
#2 Charleston Battery	0
#7 New York Red Bulls II	4
October 20 – Rio Tinto Stadium
#1 Real Monarchs	1 (1)
#8 Sacramento Republic FC (p)	1 (3)
October 21 – Swope Soccer Village
#4 Swope Park Rangers (p)	1 (4)
#5 Phoenix Rising FC	1 (2)
October 21 – Greater Nevada Field
#3 Reno 1868 FC	0
#6 OKC Energy FC	1
October 21 – Toyota Field
#2 San Antonio FC	2
#7 Tulsa Roughnecks	1

Conference Semifinals
October 28 – Louisville Slugger Field
#1 Louisville City FC	1
#4 Rochester Rhinos	0
October 28 – Al Lang Stadium
#3 Tampa Bay Rowdies	1
#7 New York Red Bulls II (a.e.t.)	2
October 28 – Children's Mercy Park
#8 Sacramento Republic FC	0
#4 Swope Park Rangers	1
October 28 – Toyota Field
#6 OKC Energy FC (p)	1 (4)
#2 San Antonio FC	1 (1)

Conference Finals
November 4 – Louisville Slugger Field
#1 Louisville City FC (p)	1 (4)
#7 New York Red Bulls II	1 (3)
November 4 – Children's Mercy Park
#4 Swope Park Rangers (p)	0 (7)
#6 OKC Energy FC	0 (6)

USL Championship
November 13 – Louisville Slugger Field (ESPNU)
#1 Louisville City FC	1
#4 Swope Park Rangers	0

October 21, 2017 Conference Quarterfinals	Tampa Bay Rowdies	3–0	FC Cincinnati	St. Petersburg
19:30 EDT (UTC−4)	Schäfer 8', 25'; Hristov (yellow card) 61', (goal) 67'; Cole (yellow card) 84'	Report	McLaughlin (yellow card) 52'; Walker (yellow card) 63'; Berry (yellow card) 90'	Stadium: Al Lang Stadium; Attendance: 6,104; Referee: Malik Badawi

October 28, 2017 Conference Semifinals	Tampa Bay Rowdies	1–2 (a.e.t.)	New York Red Bulls II	St. Petersburg
19:30 EDT (UTC−4)	Hristov 26'; Portillos (yellow card) 35'; Guenzatti (yellow card) 39'; Cole (yellow card) 42'; Pickens (yellow card) 57'; Vingaard (yellow card) 62'; Restrepo (yellow card) 66'; Paterson (yellow card) 116'	Report	Bonomo 58' (pen.), 93'; Flemmings (yellow card) 86'; Ndam (yellow card) 96'	Stadium: Al Lang Stadium; Attendance: 5,119; Referee: Joe Dickerson

=== U.S. Open Cup ===
May 16 2nd round	Tampa Bay Rowdies (Florida)	3–0	(Florida) Jacksonville Armada U-23	St. Petersburg, Florida
7:30 PM EDT	Porter 3'; Morrell 43'; Paterson 68'	TBR Report Archived September 30, 2020, at the Wayback Machine; Report	McKenna (yellow card) 55'; Rosales (yellow card) 60' dos Santos (red card) 62'; Bolt (yellow card) 63'	Stadium: Al Lang Stadium; Attendance: 2,490; Referee: Christina Unkel

May 31 3rd round	Miami FC (Florida)	2–0	(Florida) Tampa Bay Rowdies	Miami, Florida
7:30 PM EDT	Mares (yellow card) 63'; Rennella 74' (pen.); Chávez 84'	Report	Boden (yellow card) 33'; Fernandes (yellow card) 45+2'; Hristov (yellow card) 90'; Paterson (yellow card) 90+4'	Stadium: Riccardo Silva Stadium; Attendance: 1,403; Referee: Andres Pfefferkorn

== Honors ==
=== Individual honors ===
- USL All-League

Marcel Schäfer (1st team)

== Broadcast partners ==
Local Hearst Television channel, WMOR-TV, announced on March 9, 2017 that they would be the Tampa Bay Rowdies' exclusive broadcast partners for the upcoming United Soccer League season. All USL home games will be broadcast live and in primetime on channel 32.2, thisTV Tampa Bay.
