= 2015–16 Blackpool F.C. season =

English football club season

Blackpool
2015–16 season
- Owner: Owen Oyston
- Chairman: Karl Oyston
- Manager: Neil McDonald
- Stadium: Bloomfield Road; Blackpool, England (Capacity: 17,338)
- League One: 22nd (relegated)
- FA Cup: First round
- League Cup: First round
- Football League Trophy: Northern quarter-final
- Top goalscorer: League: Mark Cullen (9); All: Mark Cullen (9)
- Highest home attendance: 9,226 vs. Wigan Athletic (30 April 2016)
- Lowest home attendance: 5,960 vs. Chesterfield (29 September 2015)
Home colours	Away colours
- All statistics correct as of 8 May 2016.

The 2015–16 season was Blackpool's 107th season in the Football League, and their first season back in League One following relegation from the 2014–15 Football League Championship. Along with competing in League One, the club also participated in the FA Cup, League Cup and Football League Trophy. The season covered the period from 1 July 2015 to 30 June 2016.

The club was managed by Neil McDonald, in his first season in charge. Following Blackpool's relegation to League Two at the end of the season, McDonald left his role as Blackpool manager.

Blackpool finished 22nd in League One and were relegated for the second-successive season. They played the 2016–17 campaign in League Two, their first time playing in the bottom division of English professional football in fifteen years.

They were also knocked out of both the FA Cup and League up at the first-round stage.

== Transfers ==
=== Transfers in ===
Date from	Position	Nationality	Name	From	Fee	Ref.
1 July 2015	FW	ENG	Mark Cullen	Luton Town	£180,000	
1 July 2015	GK	IRL	Colin Doyle	Free agency		
1 July 2015	MF	SCO	John Herron	Free agency		
1 July 2015	GK	WAL	Kyle Letheren	Free agency		
1 July 2015	MF	ENG	Brad Potts	Carlisle United	Undisclosed	
1 July 2015	MF	ENG	Jarrett Rivers	Blyth Spartans	Undisclosed	
1 July 2015	DF	SCO	Clark Robertson	Free agency		
10 July 2015	MF	ENG	Jack Redshaw	Morecambe	£180,000	
29 July 2015	MF	SCO	Jim McAlister	Free agency		
5 August 2015	DF	BRB	Emmerson Boyce	Free agency		
3 September 2015	MF	ENG	David Norris	Free agency		
14 September 2015	FW	NIR	Martin Paterson	Free agency		
7 January 2016	FW	ENG	Danny Philliskirk	Oldham Athletic	Undisclosed	
7 January 2016	MF	IRE	Mark Yeates	Oldham Athletic	Free	
14 January 2016	DF	ENG	Will Aimson	Hull City	Undisclosed	

=== Transfers out ===
Date from	Position	Nationality	Name	To	Fee	Ref.
1 July 2015	FW	ENG	Tom Barkhuizen	Released		
1 July 2015	DF	ENG	Andre Blackman	Released		
1 July 2015	DF	ENG	Peter Clarke	Released		
1 July 2015	MF	POL	Tomasz Cywka	Released		
1 July 2015	FW	ENG	Steve Davies	Released		
1 July 2015	FW	ENG	Nathan Delfouneso	Released		
1 July 2015	DF	FRA	Joël Dielna	Released		
1 July 2015	FW	ENG	Bobby Grant	Released		
1 July 2015	DF	SCO	Gary MacKenzie	Released		
1 July 2015	DF	ENG	Tony McMahon	Released		
1 July 2015	MF	ENG	Jacob Mellis	Released		
1 July 2015	DF	JAM	Nyron Nosworthy	Released		
1 July 2015	DF	IRL	Darren O'Dea	Released		
1 July 2015	GK	ENG	Elliot Parish	Released		
1 July 2015	MF	ENG	David Perkins	Released		
1 July 2015	DF	BEL	Jeffrey Rentmeister	Released		
1 July 2015	FW	FRA	Saër Sène	Released		
1 July 2015	FW	CIV	François Zoko	Released		
20 July 2015	FW	ENG	Dom Telford	Stoke City	To be decided by tribunal	
20 July 2015	MF	ENG	Mark Waddington	Stoke City	To be decided by tribunal	
3 September 2015	MF	ESP	Andrea Orlandi	Anorthosis Famagusta	Free transfer	
19 January 2016	MF	CRC	José Miguel Cubero	Herediano	Undisclosed	

=== Loans in ===
Date from	Position	Nationality	Name	From	Until	Ref.
10 July 2015	DF	ENG	Lloyd Jones	Liverpool	End of season (Note: Jones' loan was extended on 3 August 2015.)	
29 July 2015	FW	ENG	Kwame Thomas	Derby County	26 November 2015 (Note: Thomas was recalled by Derby County on 26 November 2015.)	
19 October 2015	DF	ENG	Hayden White	Bolton Wanderers	End of season (Note: White's loan was extended on 6 January 2016.)	
9 November 2015	DF	ENG	Will Aimson	Hull City	9 January 2016 (Note: Aimson's loan was extended on 27 November 2015.)	
12 November 2015	GK	ENG	Dean Lyness	Burton Albion	2 January 2016	
17 November 2015	FW	NIR	Andy Little	Preston North End	30 January 2016 (Note: Little's loan was extended on 5 January 2016.)	
26 November 2015	FW	ENG	Elliot Lee	West Ham United	3 January 2016	
21 January 2016	FW	ENG	Uche Ikpeazu	Watford	End of season	
13 February 2016	GK	ENG	Dean Lyness	Burton Albion	22 March 2016	
3 March 2016	MF	ENG	Liam Smith	Newcastle United	End of season	
22 March 2016	FW	ENG	Jacob Blyth	Leicester City	End of season	

=== Loans out ===
Date from	Position	Nationality	Name	To	Until	Ref.
1 March 2016	DF	IRE	Charles Dunne	Crawley Town	End of season (Note: Dunne's loan was extended on 29 March 2016.)	
24 March 2016	MF	ENG	Connor Oliver	Morecambe	End of season	

== Competitions ==
=== Pre-season friendlies ===
11 July 2015 Friendly	Lancaster City	A–A; Match abandoned after pitch invasion	Blackpool	Lancaster
15:00 BST		Report		Stadium: Giant Axe

14 July 2015 Friendly	Blyth Spartans	0–2	Blackpool	Blyth
19:30 BST		Report	Oliver 21'; Ball 72'	Stadium: Croft Park

22 July 2015 Friendly	Ross County	1–1	Blackpool	Stirling, Scotland
15:00 BST	Graham 25'	Report	Cullen 89'	Attendance: 0

25 July 2015 Friendly	St Johnstone	0–1	Blackpool	Tulloch, Scotland
15:00 BST		Report	McAlister	Stadium: McDiarmid Park

28 July 2015 Friendly	Morecambe	2–2	Blackpool	Morecambe
19:45 BST	Molyneux; Ellison	Report	Cullen; Drury	Stadium: Globe Arena; Attendance: Played behind closed doors

31 July 2015 Friendly	Accrington Stanley	1–1	Blackpool	Accrington
19:45 BST	Conneely	Report	Osayi-Samuel 68'	Stadium: Crown Ground

=== League One ===
8 August 2015 1	Colchester United	2–2	Blackpool	Colchester
15:00 BST	Gilbey 22'; Ambrose 56'	Report	Cullen 18', 45'	Stadium: Colchester Community Stadium; Attendance: 4,438; Referee: James Linington

15 August 2015 2	Blackpool	0–2	Rochdale	Blackpool
15:00 BST		Report	McDermott 58'; Henderson 87'	Stadium: Bloomfield Road; Attendance: 7,076; Referee: Darren Drysdale

18 August 2015 3	Blackpool	1–2	Burton Albion	Blackpool
19:45 BST	Redshaw 26'	Report	El Khayati 58', 85'	Stadium: Bloomfield Road; Attendance: 6,197; Referee: Geoff Eltringham

22 August 2015 4	Sheffield United	2–0	Blackpool	Sheffield
15:00 BST	Sharp 60'; McNulty 72'	Report		Stadium: Bramall Lane; Attendance: 20,199; Referee: Darren Deadman

29 August 2015 5	Blackpool	0–4	Walsall	Blackpool
15:00 BST		Report	Sawyers 25', 74'; Aldred 57' (o.g.); Mantom 67'	Stadium: Bloomfield Road; Attendance: 7,489; Referee: Eddie Ilderton

5 September 2015 6	Scunthorpe United	0–1	Blackpool	Scunthorpe
15:00 BST		Report	Potts 35'	Stadium: Glanford Park; Attendance: 3,313; Referee: Tony Harrington

12 September 2015 7	Gillingham	2–1	Blackpool	Gillingham
15:00 BST	Loft 17'; Dack 81'	Report	Jackson 51' (o.g.)	Stadium: Priestfield Stadium; Attendance: 6,231; Referee: Gary Sutton

19 September 2015 8	Blackpool	1–1	Barnsley	Blackpool
15:00 BST	Redshaw 55'	Report	Hourihane 8'	Stadium: Bloomfield Road; Attendance: 7,542; Referee: Chris Kavanagh

26 September 2015 9	Shrewsbury Town	2–0	Blackpool	Shrewsbury
15:00 BST	Akpa Akpro 73', 76'	Report		Stadium: New Meadow; Attendance: 5,241; Referee: Darren England

29 September 2015 10	Blackpool	2–0	Chesterfield	Blackpool
19:45 BST	Cullen 2'; Potts 68'	Report		Stadium: Bloomfield Road; Attendance: 5,960; Referee: Scott Duncan

3 October 2015 11	Blackpool	1–0	Swindon Town	Blackpool
15:00 BST	Cullen 38'	Report		Stadium: Bloomfield Road; Attendance: 6,704; Referee: David Webb

17 October 2015 12	Coventry City	0–0	Blackpool	Coventry
15:00 BST		Report		Stadium: Ricoh Arena; Attendance: 12,094; Referee: Keith Hill

20 October 2015 13	Blackpool	1–1	Millwall	Blackpool
19:45 BST	Redshaw 82' (pen.)	Report	Beevers 35'	Stadium: Bloomfield Road; Attendance: 6,225; Referee: Nigel Miller

24 October 2015 14	Blackpool	2–0	Crewe Alexandra	Blackpool
15:00 BST	White 64'; Redshaw 87' (pen.)	Report		Stadium: Bloomfield Road; Attendance: 6,970; Referee: Mark Haywood

31 October 2015 15	Bury	4–3	Blackpool	Bury
15:00 GMT	Rose 2' 10'; Hussey 27'; Soares 34'	Report	Cullen 12'; Robertson 44'; Redshaw 84' (pen.)	Stadium: Gigg Lane; Attendance: 5,013; Referee: Geoff Eltringham

3 November 2015 16	Bradford City	1–0	Blackpool	Bradford
19:45 GMT	Hanson 45'	Summary		Stadium: Coral Windows Stadium; Attendance: 17,435; Referee: Andy Haines

14 November 2015 17	Blackpool	0–2	Doncaster Rovers	Blackpool
15:00 GMT		Report	Williams 5'; Taylor-Sinclair 40'	Stadium: Bloomfield Road; Attendance: 6,597; Referee: Ross Joyce

21 November 2015 18	Southend United	1–0	Blackpool	Southend-on-Sea
15:00 GMT	Thompson 76'	Report		Stadium: Roots Hall; Attendance: 6,290; Referee: Graham Horwood

24 November 2015 19	Port Vale	2–0	Blackpool	Burslem
19:45 GMT	Leitch-Smith 82'; Birchall 86'	Report		Stadium: Vale Park; Attendance: 3,640; Referee: David Webb

28 November 2015 20	Blackpool	1–0	Fleetwood	Blackpool
15:00 GMT	Pond 17' (o.g.)	Report		Stadium: Bloomfield Road; Attendance: 7,755; Referee: Graham Scott

12 December 2015 21	Wigan Athletic	0–1	Blackpool	Wigan
15:00 GMT		Report	Aldred 36'	Stadium: DW Stadium; Attendance: 8,424; Referee: Phil Gibbs

19 December 2015 22	Blackpool	2–0	Peterborough United	Blackpool
15:00 GMT	Cullen 3'; Potts 31'	Report		Stadium: Bloomfield Road; Attendance: 6,204; Referee: Robert Lewis

26 December 2015 Postponed	Blackpool	P–P	Oldham Athletic	Blackpool
15:00 GMT		Report		Stadium: Bloomfield Road

28 December 2015 23	Barnsley	4–2	Blackpool	Barnsley
15:00 GMT	Winnall 3' 54'; Watkins 56'; Long (yellow card) 86'; Templeton 90+2'	Report	Ferguson (yellow card) 18'; Aimson (yellow card) 45+1'; Cullen 52' (yellow card) 83'; Potts (yellow card) 84'; Little 90'	Stadium: Oakwell; Attendance: 9,072; Referee: (England) Chris Sarginson

2 January 2016 24	Burton Albion	1–0	Blackpool	Burton upon Trent
15:00 GMT	Weir (yellow card) 41' (yellow-red card); Duffy 63'	Report	Aimson (yellow card) 30'; Aldred (yellow card) 61'	Stadium: Pirelli Stadium; Attendance: 4,339; Referee: (England) Richard Clark

9 January 2016 25	Blackpool	0–1	Port Vale	Blackpool
15:00 GMT	Norris (yellow card) 21'; McAlister (yellow card) 52'; Aimson (yellow card) 66'; White (yellow card) 90+1'	Report	Leitch-Smith 49'; Brown (yellow card) 90+1'	Stadium: Bloomfield Road; Attendance: 6,527; Referee: (England) Seb Stockbridge

16 January 2016 26	Blackpool	5–0	Scunthorpe United	Blackpool
15:00 GMT	Aldred 2'; Potts 12' 28'; Norris 55'; Philliskirk 82'	Report	Williams (yellow card) 19' van Veen (yellow card) 58'	Stadium: Bloomfield Road; Attendance: 6,004; Referee: (England) Darren Deadman

23 January 2016 27	Walsall	1–1	Blackpool	Walsall
15:00 GMT	Chambers (yellow card) 34'; Taylor (yellow card) 45+1'; Demetriou 66'; Downing (yellow card) 90+3'	Report	Norris (yellow card) 18'; Aldred (yellow card) 48'; McAlister (yellow card) 85'; Philliskirk 90+4'	Stadium: Banks's Stadium; Attendance: 5,022; Referee: (England) Dean Whitestone

26 January 2016 28	Blackpool	0–0	Sheffield United	Blackpool
19:45 GMT		Report	Sammon (yellow card) 63'; Edgar (yellow card) 90+2'; Brayford (yellow card) 90+5'	Stadium: Bloomfield Road; Attendance: 6,296; Referee: (England) Ross Joyce

30 January 2016 29	Blackpool	1–0	Gillingham	Blackpool
15:00 GMT	Redshaw 45' (pen.); Cullen (yellow card) 66'; Norris (yellow card) 75'	Report	Morris (yellow card) 44'; Ehmer (yellow card) 53'	Stadium: Bloomfield Road; Attendance: 6,828; Referee: (England) Andy Madley

6 February 2016 Postponed	Oldham Athletic	P–P	Blackpool	Oldham
15:00 GMT				Stadium: SportsDirect.com Park

13 February 2016 30	Blackpool	2–3	Shrewsbury Town	Blackpool
15:00 GMT	Aldred 36'; Aimson (yellow card) 53'; Philliskirk 54'	Report	Knight-Percival 5'; Whalley 7'; Mangan 29'; Akpa Akpro (yellow card) 90+1'	Stadium: Bloomfield Road; Attendance: 6,873; Referee: (England) Carl Boyeson

16 February 2016 31	Blackpool	0–0	Oldham Athletic	Blackpool
19:45 GMT		Report		Stadium: Bloomfield Road; Attendance: 7,197; Referee: (England) Paul Tierney

20 February 2016 32	Swindon Town	3–2	Blackpool	Swindon
15:00 GMT	Ajose 17' 61' 88'; Traoré (yellow card) 37'; Barry (yellow card) 82'	Report	Aldred 2'; Norris (yellow card) 24'; Philiskirk 65' (pen.)	Stadium: County Ground; Attendance: 7,412; Referee: (England) Phil Gibbs

27 February 2016 33	Blackpool	0–1	Bradford City	Blackpool
15:00 GMT	Aimson (yellow card) 16' (yellow-red card) 90+4'	Report	Reid 54'	Stadium: Bloomfield Road; Attendance: 8,780; Referee: Michael Bull

1 March 2016 34	Chesterfield	1–1	Blackpool	Chesterfield
19:45 GMT	O'Shea 57'	Report	Potts 54'; Ferguson (yellow card) 18' (yellow-red card) 89'	Stadium: Proact Stadium; Attendance: 5,915; Referee: Eddie Illderton

5 March 2016 35	Millwall	3–0	Blackpool	Bermondsey
15:00 GMT	Gregory 7'; Wallace 24'; Morison 84' (pen.)	Report	White (yellow card) 56' (yellow-red card) 76'	Stadium: The New Den; Attendance: 9,753; Referee: Lee Swabey

12 March 2016 36	Blackpool	0–1	Coventry City	Blackpool
15:00 GMT	Boyce (yellow card) 69'; Osayi-Samuel (yellow card) 90+7'	Report	Fortuné 26'	Stadium: Bloomfield Road; Attendance: 8,869; Referee: (England) Mark Brown

15 March 2016 37	Oldham Athletic	1–0	Blackpool	Oldham
19:45 GMT	Palmer 53'; Kelly (yellow card) 60'; Jones (yellow card) 64'	Report	Potts (yellow card) 60'; Aldred (yellow card) 62'	Stadium: SportsDirect.com Park; Attendance: 3,715; Referee: (England) Jeremy Simpson

19 March 2016 38	Crewe Alexandra	1–2	Blackpool	Crewe
15:00 GMT	Haber 83'	Report	Redshaw 34'; Aldred 84'; Redshaw (yellow card) 34' (yellow-red card) 39'	Stadium: Alexandra Stadium; Attendance: 4,480

25 March 2016 39	Blackpool	1–1	Bury	Blackpool
15:00 GMT	Philiskirk 74' (pen.)	Report	Mayor 76'	Stadium: Bloomfield Road; Attendance: 7,645

28 March 2016 40	Doncaster Rovers	0–1	Blackpool	Doncaster
15:00 GMT		Report	Cullen 87'	Stadium: Keepmoat Stadium; Attendance: 5,575

2 April 2016 41	Blackpool	2–0	Southend United	Blackpool
15:00 GMT	Cullen 49'; Blyth 79'	Report	Barnett (yellow card) 90+2'	Stadium: Bloomfield Road; Attendance: 6,979; Referee: (England) Mark Haywood

9 April 2016 42	Blackpool	0–1	Colchester United	Blackpool
15:00 GMT	Aldred (yellow card) 29'; McAlister (yellow card) 85'	Report	Porter 60'	Stadium: Bloomfield Road; Attendance: 6,242

16 April 2016 43	Rochdale	3–0	Blackpool	Rochdale
15:00 GMT	Eastham 45'; Bunney 50'; Mendez-Laing 60'	Report	Boyce (yellow card) 88'	Stadium: Spotland; Attendance: 3,274

23 April 2016 44	Fleetwood Town	0–0	Blackpool	Fleetwood
15:00 GMT	White (yellow card) 24'	Report	Pond (yellow card) 64'	Stadium: Highbury Stadium; Attendance: 5,123

30 April 2016 45	Blackpool	0–4	Wigan Athletic	Blackpool
12:30 GMT		Report	McCann 60'; Wildschut 70', 72'; Grigg 85'	Stadium: Bloomfield Road; Attendance: 9,226

8 May 2016 46	Peterborough United	5–1	Blackpool	Peterborough
12:30 GMT	Maddison 48' (pen.); Taylor 74', 84', 86'; Coulthirst 76'	Report	Blyth 16'	Stadium: ABAX Stadium; Attendance: 6,005

==== Table ====
Pos	Team	Pld	W	D	L	GF	GA	GD	Pts	Promotion, qualification or relegation
20	Shrewsbury Town	46	13	11	22	58	79	−21	50	
21	Doncaster Rovers (R)	46	11	13	22	48	64	−16	46	Relegation to EFL League Two
22	Blackpool (R)	46	12	10	24	40	63	−23	46	Relegation to EFL League Two
23	Colchester United (R)	46	9	13	24	57	99	−42	40	Relegation to EFL League Two
24	Crewe Alexandra (R)	46	7	13	26	46	83	−37	34	Relegation to EFL League Two

Updated to match(es) played on 1 July 2016. Source: BBC Sport
Rules for classification: 1) Points; 2) Goal difference; 3) Number of goals scored
(R) Relegated

=== FA Cup ===
7 November 2015 First round	Barnet	2–0	Blackpool	Barnet
15:00	Champion 36'; Gash 41'	Report		Stadium: The Hive Stadium; Attendance: 1,869; Referee: (England) Kevin Johnson

=== League Cup ===
11 August 2015 First round	Northampton Town	3–0	Blackpool	Northampton
19:45 BST	Hackett 20'; Calvert-Lewin 24'; Hoskins 29'	Report		Stadium: Sixfields Stadium; Attendance: 2,549; Referee: James Adcock

=== Football League Trophy ===
6 October 2015 Second round	Port Vale	1–2	Blackpool	Burslem
19:45 BST	Grant 52' (pen.)	Summary	Rivers 44'; Robertson 56'	Stadium: Vale Park; Attendance: 2,720

10 November 2015 Northern QF	Wigan Athletic	4–0	Blackpool	Wigan
19:15	Hiwula 20' 78' (pen.); Murray 63'; Wildschut 71'	Report		Stadium: DW Stadium; Attendance: 5,224

=== Lancashire Senior Cup ===
8 September 2015 First round	Blackpool	4–2	Morecambe	Blackpool
14:00 BST	Paterson; Dunne; Thomas; Oliver	Report	Mullin 2'; Ellison	Stadium: Bloomfield Road; Referee: James Mainwaring

24 February 2016 Quarter Final	Blackpool	0–1	Manchester United	Blackpool
14:00 BST		Report	McTominay 71'	Stadium: Bloomfield Road

=== Top scorers ===
Place	Position	Nation	Number	Name	League One	FA Cup	League Cup	FL Trophy	Total
1	FW	(England)	9	Mark Cullen	9	0	0	0	9
2	FW	(England)	10	Jack Redshaw	7	0	0	0	7
3	MF	(England)	8	Brad Potts	6	0	0	0	6
4	FW	(England)	17	Danny Philliskirk	5	0	0	0	5
4	DF	(Scotland)	15	Tom Aldred	5	0	0	0	5
