= 2007–08 Scunthorpe United F.C. season =

Scunthorpe United
2007–08 season
- Chairman: J. Steven Wharton
- Manager: Nigel Adkins
- Championship: 23rd (relegated)
- FA Cup: Third round
- League Cup: First round
- Top goalscorer: League: Paterson (13); All: Paterson (14)
- Average home league attendance: 6,434

During the 2007–08 English football season, Scunthorpe United F.C. competed in the Football League Championship and in the second tier of English football for the first time since 1964, following promotion from League One the previous season.

== Season summary ==
Before the start of the 2007–08 season, Billy Sharp was sold to Sheffield United for a then-club record £2,000,000. Despite his ostensible replacement, Martin Paterson, scoring 13 league goals, Scunthorpe were unable to cement their place in the second tier of English football, and were relegated in 23rd place. Paterson was then sold to Burnley at the end of the season for a £1,600,000.

== Final league table ==
Pos	Team	Pld	W	D	L	GF	GA	GD	Pts	Promotion, qualification or relegation
20	Southampton	46	13	15	18	56	72	−16	54	
21	Coventry City	46	14	11	21	52	64	−12	53	
22	Leicester City (R)	46	12	16	18	42	45	−3	52	Relegation to Football League One
23	Scunthorpe United (R)	46	11	13	22	46	69	−23	46	Relegation to Football League One
24	Colchester United (R)	46	7	17	22	62	86	−24	38	Relegation to Football League One

Updated to match(es) played on 4 May 2008. Source: The Football League
Rules for classification: 1) points; 2) goal difference; 3) number of goals scored.
(R) Relegated

== Results ==
Scunthorpe United's score comes first

=== Legend ===
Win	Draw	Loss

=== Football League Championship ===
Date	Opponent	Venue	Result	Attendance	Scorers
11 August 2007	Charlton Athletic	A	1–1	23,151	Iriekpen
18 August 2007	Burnley	H	2–0	6,975	Paterson, Goodwin
25 August 2007	Bristol City	A	1–2	12,474	Paterson
1 September 2007	Sheffield United	H	3–2	8,801	Crosby, Paterson, Sparrow
15 September 2007	Barnsley	A	0–2	11,230	
18 September 2007	Preston North End	H	2–1	5,754	Crosby, Hayes
22 September 2007	West Bromwich Albion	H	2–3	8,307	Crosby (pen), Paterson
29 September 2007	Colchester United	A	1–0	5,218	Hayes
2 October 2007	Norwich City	A	0–0	23,176	
6 October 2007	Watford	H	1–3	7,515	Forte
20 October 2007	Leicester City	H	0–0	6,006	
23 October 2007	Sheffield Wednesday	A	2–1	21,557	Paterson (2)
27 October 2007	Cardiff City	A	1–1	11,850	Goodwin
3 November 2007	Crystal Palace	H	0–0	6,778	
6 November 2007	Stoke City	H	2–3	5,521	Hayes, Goodwin
10 November 2007	Blackpool	A	0–1	8,051	
24 November 2007	Hull City	H	1–2	8,633	Forte
27 November 2007	Coventry City	A	1–1	14,036	Cork
1 December 2007	Plymouth Argyle	A	0–3	10,520	
3 December 2007	Blackpool	H	1–1	4,407	Butler
8 December 2007	Queens Park Rangers	H	2–2	5,612	Paterson, Forte
15 December 2007	Ipswich Town	A	2–3	19,306	Paterson (2)
22 December 2007	Norwich City	H	0–1	6,648	
26 December 2007	Preston North End	A	1–0	12,920	Paterson
29 December 2007	West Bromwich Albion	A	0–5	25,238	
1 January 2008	Barnsley	H	2–2	6,897	Morris, Youga
12 January 2008	Southampton	A	0–1	18,416	
19 January 2008	Wolverhampton Wanderers	H	0–2	7,465	
26 January 2008	Burnley	A	0–2	14,516	
2 February 2008	Charlton Athletic	H	1–0	6,084	Paterson
9 February 2008	Sheffield United	A	0–0	25,668	
12 February 2008	Bristol City	H	0–1	5,423	
15 February 2008	Stoke City	A	2–3	20,979	Paterson, Hobbs
23 February 2008	Southampton	H	1–1	6,035	Crosby
1 March 2008	Coventry City	H	2–1	5,866	Paterson, Cork
8 March 2008	Hull City	A	0–2	20,906	
11 March 2008	Plymouth Argyle	H	1–0	4,920	Morris
15 March 2008	Queens Park Rangers	A	1–3	14,499	McCann
18 March 2008	Wolverhampton Wanderers	A	1–2	21,628	Butler
22 March 2008	Ipswich Town	H	1–2	6,636	May
29 March 2008	Leicester City	A	0–1	22,165	
5 April 2008	Sheffield Wednesday	H	1–1	7,425	Morris
12 April 2008	Crystal Palace	A	0–2	15,975	
19 April 2008	Cardiff City	H	3–2	4,727	Hayes (2, 1 pen), Hurst
26 April 2008	Watford	A	1–0	16,454	Hayes
4 May 2008	Colchester United	H	3–3	5,554	Forte, Hayes (2)

=== FA Cup ===
Round	Date	Opponent	Venue	Result	Attendance	Goalscorers
R3	5 January 2008	Preston North End	A	0–1	4,616	

=== League Cup ===
Round	Date	Opponent	Venue	Result	Attendance	Goalscorers
R1	14 August 2007	Hartlepool United	H	1–2	2,965	Paterson

== Squad ==
Note: Flags indicate national team as defined under FIFA eligibility rules; some limited exceptions apply. Players may hold more than one non-FIFA nationality.

No.	Pos.	Nation	Player
1	GK	(Republic of Ireland) IRL	Joe Murphy
2	DF	(England) ENG	Jack Hobbs (on loan from Liverpool)
3	DF	(England) ENG	Marcus Williams
4	DF	(England) ENG	Andy Crosby
5	DF	(England) ENG	Izzy Iriekpen
6	DF	(Republic of Ireland) IRL	Cliff Byrne
7	MF	(England) ENG	Matt Sparrow
8	DF	(Republic of Ireland) IRL	Jim Goodwin
9	FW	(England) ENG	Paul Hayes
10	FW	(Northern Ireland) NIR	Martin Paterson
11	DF	(England) ENG	Ian Baraclough
14	FW	(England) ENG	Geoff Horsfield (on loan from Sheffield United)
15	MF	(England) ENG	Curtis Weston (on loan from Leeds United)
16	DF	(England) ENG	Jack Cork (on loan from Chelsea)
17	MF	(Northern Ireland) NIR	Grant McCann

No.	Pos.	Nation	Player
18	DF	(England) ENG	Andy Butler
19	FW	(Barbados) BRB	Jonathan Forte
20	MF	(Cameroon) CMR	Alexandre Morfaw
21	DF	(England) ENG	Jake Picton
22	GK	(England) ENG	Josh Lillis
23	MF	(England) ENG	Kevan Hurst
24	MF	(England) ENG	Andrew Wright
25	FW	(England) ENG	Peter Winn
26	FW	(England) ENG	Tomi Ameobi (on loan from Leeds United)
27	MF	(Republic of Ireland) IRL	Ian Morris
28	MF	(Northern Ireland) NIR	Kevin Horlock
29	DF	(England) ENG	Joe Wilcox
30	FW	(England) ENG	Ben May
40	GK	(England) ENG	Kevin Pressman

=== Left club during season ===
Note: Flags indicate national team as defined under FIFA eligibility rules; some limited exceptions apply. Players may hold more than one non-FIFA nationality.

No.	Pos.	Nation	Player
21	FW	(England) ENG	Ben May (on loan from Millwall)
17	DF	(Central African Republic) CTA	Kelly Youga (on loan from Charlton Athletic)
24	DF	(England) ENG	Shaleum Logan (on loan from Manchester City)
14	FW	(England) ENG	Daniel McBreen (to St Johnstone)

No.	Pos.	Nation	Player
2	DF	(New Zealand) NZL	Dave Mulligan (to Port Vale)
14	DF	(Netherlands Antilles) ANT	Shelton Martis (on loan from West Bromwich Albion)
15	MF	(England) ENG	Cleveland Taylor (to Carlisle United)
21	DF	(Senegal) SEN	Mamadou Seck (on loan from Sheffield United)

== Team kit ==
- Manufacturer: Carlotti
- Principal Sponsor: Rainham Steel
- Secondary Sponsor: Smiths Fashion

2007–08 home colours	2007–08 away colours
