= Jarrett Rivers =

English footballer (born 1993)

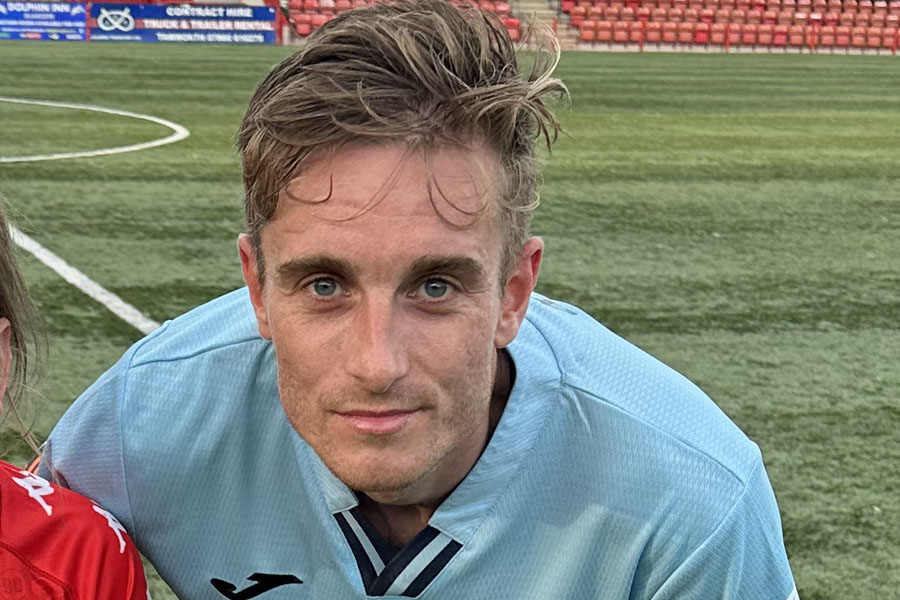
- Rivers in October 2023

Personal information
- Full name: Jarrett Anthony Rivers
- Date of birth: 10 September 1993 (age 33)
- Place of birth: Spennymoor, England
- Position: Right winger

Team information
- Current team: Whitby Town

Youth career
- Middlesbrough

Senior career*
Years	Team	Apps	(Gls)
2013–2014	Whitley Bay		
2014–2015	Blyth Spartans		
2015–2016	Blackpool	10	(0)
2016–2019	Blyth Spartans		
2019–2025	Darlington	156	(9)
2025–	Whitby Town		
- * Club domestic league appearances and goals as of 07:45, 30 April 2025 (UTC)

Jarrett Anthony Rivers (born 10 September 1993) is an English professional footballer who plays as a right winger for Whitby Town. He previously played in the Football League for Blackpool.

== Career ==
Rivers played youth football for Middlesbrough; after he was released he began working in a factory but "quit after one day because it made me realise I did not want to do that for the rest of my life, so I have worked hard in football ever since." After spending the 2013–14 season with Whitley Bay, Rivers joined Blyth Spartans. He combined his non-league football career with a job in his mother's newsagents shop. After impressing in Blyth Spartans' FA Cup run, including scoring the winner in the second-round victory against Hartlepool United, he went on trial with Oldham Athletic in January 2015. He was named Northern Premier League Young Player of the Season for 2014–15, and in May 2015 he signed a one-year professional contract with an option for a second year with Blackpool, newly relegated to League One. He made 10 League One appearances for Blackpool, mainly as a substitute, but the option for a further year was not taken up and he rejoined Blyth Spartans in August 2016.

He signed for Darlington in May 2019. He moved to Whitby Town in May 2025. Rivers left Whitby at the end of the 2025–26 season.

== Career statistics ==
As of 21 February 2016

Club	Season	League		FA Cup		League Cup		Other		Total	
Club	Season	Apps	Goals	Apps	Goals	Apps	Goals	Apps	Goals	Apps	Goals
Blackpool	2015–16	10	0	1	0	0	0	2	1	13	1
Career total		10	0	1	0	0	0	2	1	13	1
