= Paul Wilson (Jamaican footballer) =

Jamaican footballer (born 1993)

Personal information
- Date of birth: 16 July 1993 (age 33)
- Place of birth: May Pen, Jamaica
- Height: 1.62 m (5 ft 4 in)
- Position: Attacking midfielder

Team information
- Current team: Cavalier F.C.
- Number: 10

Youth career
- 2009–2011: Portmore United

Senior career*
Years	Team	Apps	(Gls)
2011–2016	Portmore United		
2016–2017	Harrisburg City Islanders	56	(7)
2018–	Cavalier F.C.	1	(1)

International career^{‡}
2008	Jamaica U17		
2012–2013	Jamaica U20		
2013	Jamaica U23		
- * Club domestic league appearances and goals as of 11:41, 19 October 2017 (UTC) ‡ National team caps and goals as of 15:22, 23 November 2014 (UTC)

Paul Wilson (born 16 July 1993) is a Jamaican international footballer who plays as a midfielder for Harrisburg City Islanders in the USL.

== Career ==
=== Club ===
==== Portmore United ====
Wilson began his senior club career at Portmore United in Jamaica.

==== Harrisburg City Islanders ====
Wilson has played club football for Portmore United from 2009 until he signed a two-year deal with American side Harrisburg City Islanders who compete in the United Soccer League.

=== Cavalier ===
In 2018, Wilson returned to Jamaica and signed with Cavalier F.C.
