= Mouhamed Dabo =

Senegalese footballer (born 1996)

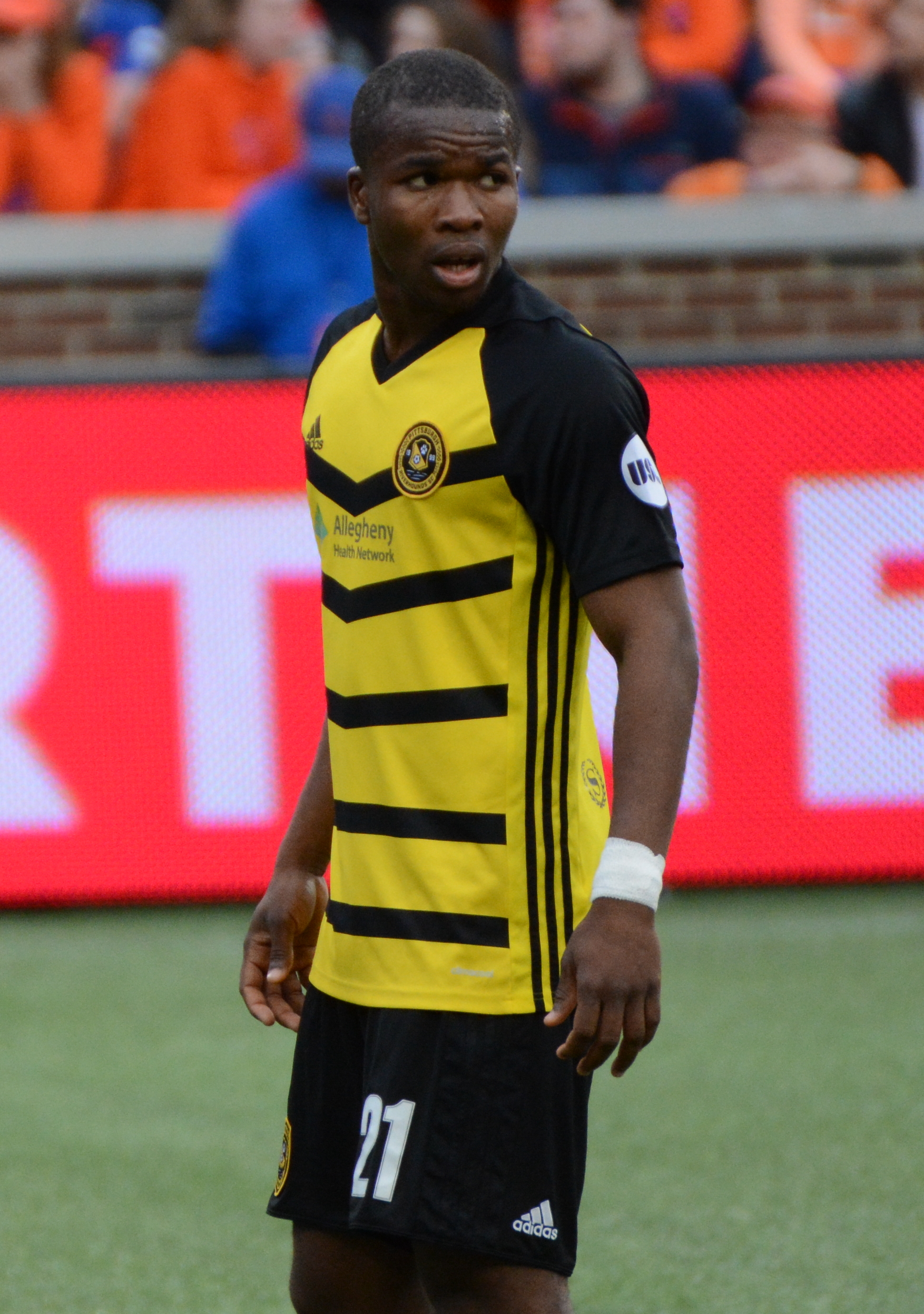
- Dabo with Pittsburgh Riverhounds in 2018

Personal information
- Date of birth: 2 January 1996 (age 30)
- Place of birth: Mbediene, Senegal
- Height: 1.76 m (5 ft 9 in)
- Position: Midfielder

Youth career
- –2013: Sacilese
- 2013–2015: Internazionale

Senior career*
Years	Team	Apps	(Gls)
2016–2017	Harrisburg City Islanders	42	(0)
2018–2019	Pittsburgh Riverhounds	44	(1)
2020	Reno 1868	9	(0)
2022–2024	Central Valley Fuego	49	(0)

International career
2013	Senegal U17	5	(1)
- * Club domestic league appearances and goals as of 31 October 2024

Mouhamed Dabo (born 2 January 1996) is a Senegalese professional footballer who plays as a midfielder.

== Career ==
Dabo began his career trialing with Arsenal prior to a three-year stint with the Inter Milan youth system.

=== Harrisburg City Islanders ===
Dabo earned his first professional contract with Harrisburg City Islanders competing in the United Soccer League ahead of the 2016 season. After earning 21 appearances his first season, Dabo was re-signed ahead of the 2017 season.

=== Pittsburgh Riverhounds SC ===
It was announced on 27 February 2018 that Dabo had signed for Pittsburgh Riverhounds SC of the United Soccer League after trialing with the club throughout the preseason.

=== Reno 1868 ===
On 6 December 2019, it was announced that Dabo would move to Reno 1868 ahead of their 2020 season. Reno folded their team on November 6, 2020, due to the financial impact of the COVID-19 pandemic.

=== Central Valley Fuego ===
On 16 February 2022, Dabo signed with Central Valley Fuego ahead of their inaugural USL League One season.
