= Martin Paterson =

Football manager and former player (born 1987)

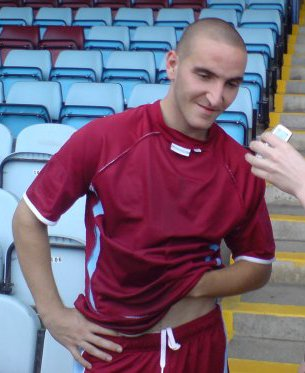
- Paterson with Scunthorpe United in 2007

Personal information
- Full name: Martin Andrew Paterson
- Date of birth: 13 May 1987 (age 39)
- Place of birth: Tunstall, Staffordshire, England
- Height: 5 ft 10 in (1.78 m)
- Position: Forward

Team information
- Current team: Notts County (manager)

Youth career
- 1998–2005: Stoke City

Senior career*
Years	Team	Apps	(Gls)
2005–2007	Stoke City	15	(1)
2006–2007	→ Grimsby Town (loan)	15	(6)
2007–2008	Scunthorpe United	40	(13)
2008–2013	Burnley	130	(29)
2013–2015	Huddersfield Town	25	(5)
2014	→ Bristol City (loan)	8	(1)
2014	→ Fleetwood Town (loan)	3	(0)
2015	→ Orlando City (loan)	3	(0)
2015	Orlando City	1	(0)
2015–2016	Blackpool	17	(0)
2016	Port Vale	16	(2)
2017	Tampa Bay Rowdies	27	(9)
2018	ATK	5	(1)
Total		305	(67)

International career
2007	Northern Ireland U21	2	(0)
2007–2014	Northern Ireland	22	(3)

Managerial career
- 2024: Burton Albion
- 2025–: Notts County
- * Club domestic league appearances and goals

Martin Andrew Paterson (born 13 May 1987) is a professional football manager and former player who is the head coach of EFL League One club Notts County.

Paterson played as a forward; he began his career with Stoke City, making his senior debut in April 2005. He failed to win a regular first-team place, however, and had a loan spell at Grimsby Town in the 2006–07 season before he was allowed to join Scunthorpe United in July 2007. He scored 13 goals in the Championship in the 2007–08 season and was signed by Burnley for a £1 million fee in June 2008. He scored 19 goals in 57 appearances in the 2008–09 campaign, helping the club to win promotion into the Premier League via the play-offs. Burnley were relegated at the end of the 2009–10 season, and he went on to join Huddersfield Town on a free transfer in June 2013. He had loan spells at Bristol City, Fleetwood Town, and MLS club Orlando City. Huddersfield released him and then had a brief spell with Orlando City before he spent the 2015–16 season with Blackpool. He joined Port Vale for four months in August 2016 before returning to America to play for the Tampa Bay Rowdies in March 2017. He moved to India in January 2018 to sign for ATK. Throughout his 14-year professional career, he scored 78 goals in 339 league and cup appearances.

Internationally, Paterson won 23 caps for Northern Ireland in a seven-year international career from 2007 to 2014, scoring three international goals. After retiring as a player, he moved into coaching with Tampa Bay Rowdies, Fort Lauderdale, Inter Miami, Barnsley, Swansea City, before becoming the head coach at Burton Albion in January 2024 until May 2024. He then became part of the backroom staff at Huddersfield Town. He returned to a head coaching role with Notts County in June 2025 and led the club to promotion via the League Two play-offs in 2026.

== Club career ==
=== Stoke City ===
Born in Tunstall, Staffordshire, Paterson failed a trial at nearby Port Vale at the age of nine as the club felt he was too small, but was instead accepted into the Stoke City academy. He made his first-team debut for Stoke as a late substitute for Chris Greenacre in a 2–0 win over Plymouth Argyle in a Championship game at the Britannia Stadium on 16 April 2005. His first start came in a 0–0 draw with Leeds United at Elland Road on 25 March 2006. He had dyed his hair red and white before the game, but was sent home to have it cut by manager Tony Pulis. He scored his first goal for the club on 12 September 2006, in a 1–1 draw with Sheffield Wednesday at Hillsborough Stadium. Nine weeks later he joined League Two side Grimsby Town on an initial one-month loan, along with Stoke teammate Anthony Pulis. He scored four goals in his first three appearances for the "Mariners". The loan was extended into a third month, and after scoring a total of six goals in his 15 games for Grimsby, manager Alan Buckley said that "for supporters to sing 'why don't you sign him', we've got to get real... there was never any possibility of us making anything permanent for a player like Martin." Wrexham tried to acquire the striker on loan, but he instead remained at Stoke. He played three further games for the "Potters" towards the end of the 2006–07 season, before departing in the summer. Manager Tony Pulis said that "it was the right decision to let him go – in the summer of 2007 – because there was no way he was going to play in front of Ricardo Fuller".

=== Scunthorpe United ===
In July 2007, Paterson was signed by Scunthorpe United manager Nigel Adkins for a fee set by a tribunal. He enjoyed an excellent start to the 2007–08 season, scoring four goals in his first five games. He ended the campaign with 14 goals in 42 appearances, but the "Iron" were relegated out of the Championship. He left the club in acrimonious circumstances, accusing Scunthorpe of having gone back on their word after they rejected his written transfer request.

=== Burnley ===
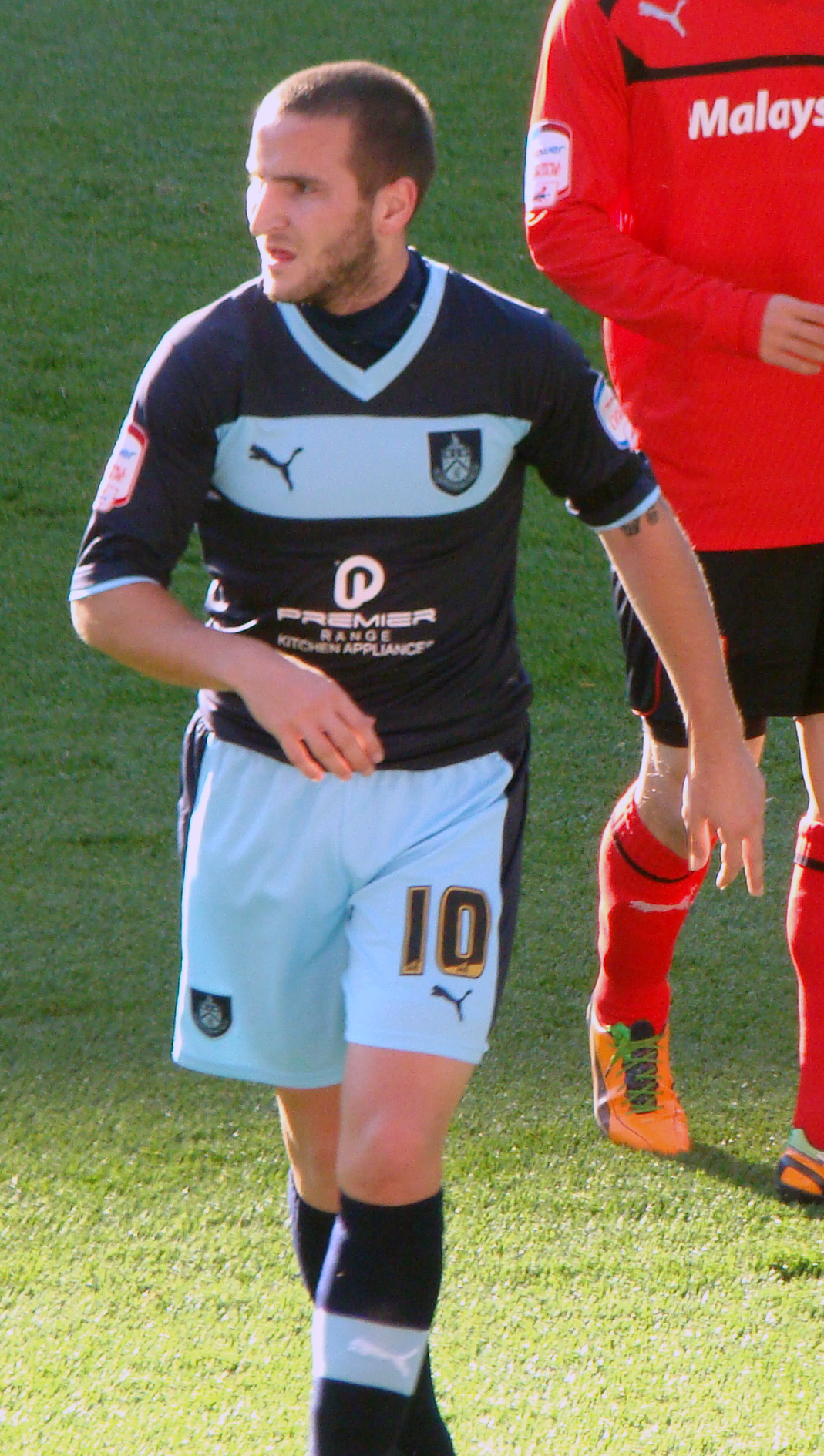
Paterson playing for Burnley in 2012

In June 2008, Paterson agreed a four-year contract with Burnley after being signed by manager Owen Coyle for a £1 million fee, which would rise to £1.3 million depending on appearances; the deal included a 20% sell on fee for Scunthorpe. He scored 19 goals in 57 appearances in the 2008–09 season, finishing as the club's top-scorer, as the "Clarets" reached the semi-finals of the League Cup and won promotion into the Premier League via the play-offs . He played the full 90 minutes at Wembley Stadium as Burnley beat Sheffield United 1–0 in the play-off final.

He tore his medial knee ligament in September 2009 and was kept him out of action for three months as he was forced to undergo surgery to correct the problem. He returned to fitness, and scored his first Premier League goal on 21 February in a 5–2 defeat to Aston Villa at Villa Park. Six days later he made his first league start since his return from injury, and scored Burnley's consolation goal in a 2–1 defeat to Portsmouth at Turf Moor after lobbing England international goalkeeper David James. He scored in a 4–1 victory over Hull City at the KC Stadium on 10 April, and scored his fourth and final goal of the campaign in a 4–2 home win over Tottenham Hotspur on 9 May. Burnley were relegated at the end of the 2009–10 season, along with Hull City and Portsmouth, after finishing five points short of safety.

Paterson signed a new three-year contract in June 2010, with manager Brian Laws stating that "it is a reward for the season he had. Even though he was injured for a good part, Martin certainly made an impact". It took until 6 November for him to register his first goals of the season, scoring twice in a 2–2 draw with Norwich City at Carrow Road. He then picked up a thigh injury later in the month which kept him out over Christmas, and the injury re-occurred in February to rule him out for the rest of the season.

In August 2011, it was reported that Burnley rejected an offer of £2.5 million from Portsmouth for Paterson. He was again plagued by injury during the 2011–12 campaign, with a thigh problem picked up in August keeping him out until December and then a pulled hamstring picked up January keeping him out until the middle of February. He again picked up a hamstring tear in August 2012, but recovered quickly and went on to score eight goals in 39 appearances in the 2012–13 campaign. However, manager Sean Dyche used him primarily as a winger, and speaking in February 2013, Paterson joked that "it's pretty hard to get a game [at centre-forward] - I'll possibly have to shoot Charlie to get a game if I'm honest". Wolverhampton Wanderers attempted to sign Paterson on loan the following month, but were rebuffed by Dyche. Paterson rejected Burnley's offer of a new contract in the summer.

=== Huddersfield Town ===
Paterson signed a two-year contract with Huddersfield Town in June 2013, becoming manager Mark Robins's third signing ahead of the 2013–14 season. He stated that the promise of being played in his favoured position of centre-forward was a major factor in his decision to join the club. Three months later both he and teammate Adam Clayton were dropped from the first-team amid rumours of a training ground bust-up between the pair where Paterson was alleged to have punched Clayton. On 23 November, both players were re-instated to the first-team against Sheffield Wednesday at Hillsborough Stadium, in which Paterson scored his first goal of the season, set-up by Clayton; following the goal Paterson celebrated by re-enacting a 'mock-fight' with Clayton. Paterson went on to fall behind Nahki Wells and James Vaughan in the pecking order however, and on 15 March he joined Bristol City on loan for the rest of the season. Bristol City manager Steve Cotterill had previously tried to sign Paterson when he was manager of Portsmouth. He made his debut for the "Robins" in a 0–0 draw with Swindon Town at Ashton Gate on 15 March, and admitted he was "disappointed not to score" after missing a good chance to win the game. He ended the 2013–14 campaign with one goal in eight games for Bristol City, and six goals in 26 games for Huddersfield.

He picked up a knee injury picked up towards the end of the 2014–15 pre-season which put him out of contention until September. He made his first start of the season, as a substitute, in a 4–2 win over Blackpool at the John Smith's Stadium on 18 October. On 13 November, he joined League One side Fleetwood Town on loan until 3 January 2015. Fleetwood manager Graham Alexander had previously played with Paterson at Burnley. Injury cut short his loan after only three appearances, and he returned to Huddersfield on 4 December.

=== Orlando City ===
On 26 January 2015, Paterson joined Major League Soccer side Orlando City, who were managed by fellow Stoke-on-Trent native Adrian Heath, on a five-month loan deal. The move made him a teammate of former Ballon d'Or winner Kaká. However, Paterson went on to make only a combined total of 53 minutes in four appearances for Orlando due to a succession of injuries. He left the club by mutual consent on 5 August due to "personal reasons".

=== Blackpool ===
Paterson joined League One side Blackpool in September 2015. He started two games and made 17 substitute appearances for the "Seasiders" in the 2015–16 season, without scoring a goal, as the club were relegated into League Two. He was one of six players released by manager Neil McDonald in May 2016.

=== Port Vale ===
Paterson signed with League One club Port Vale in August 2016. He made his first start for the "Valiants" on 30 August, in a 1–0 win over Derby County U23 in an EFL Trophy match; he admitted that "I was disappointed not to score, I should have scored... I know that I have to work hard to get that sharpness and the top end ruthlessness back, but hard work has never been an issue for me". He scored his first goal in 30 months on 24 September, converting his only chance of the game to open the scoring in a 2–1 defeat to Bristol Rovers at the Memorial Stadium. However, he struggled with a back injury and remained unpopular with supporters due to his Stoke City connections, and left Vale Park on 27 December upon the expiry of his contract, having scored only two goals in 12 starts and six substitute appearances. He departed the club just a day after manager Bruno Ribeiro.

=== Tampa Bay Rowdies ===
Paterson signed a contract with the Tampa Bay Rowdies of the United Soccer League on 15 March 2017, having already appeared in four pre-season games as a trialist. He scored ten goals in 29 appearances across the 2017 season, helping Stuart Campbell's Rowdies to a third-place finish in the Eastern Conference, before they were beaten at the Conference Semi-finals by the New York Red Bulls II.

=== ATK ===
On 17 January 2018, Paterson joined ATK of the Indian Super League after being signed by head coach Teddy Sheringham. However, Sherringham was sacked days later, leaving Ashley Westwood in interim charge for Paterson's scoring debut in a 2–1 defeat to Chennaiyin FC at the Salt Lake Stadium on 25 January.

== International career ==
Born in England, Paterson qualified to represent Northern Ireland at international level as his father was from Northern Ireland, and he was alerted to the Irish Football Association by Ciarán Toner. He won two caps for the Northern Ireland under-21 side, before withdrawing from the squad for personal reasons in October 2007.

Nigel Worthington handed Paterson his senior team debut as a 72nd-minute substitute for Warren Feeney in a 1–0 defeat to Spain in a UEFA Euro 2008 qualifying match on 17 November 2007. He made his first start for Northern Ireland on 20 August 2008, in a 0–0 draw with Scotland. He scored his first international goal with an 84th-minute penalty in a 3–3 draw in a friendly against Finland at Windsor Park on 15 August 2012. He scored his second international goal on 14 August 2013, his header securing Michael O'Neill his first win as manager with a 1–0 victory over Russia in a qualifying game for the 2014 FIFA World Cup. He scored the third goal of his international career on 10 September 2013, in a 3–2 defeat to Luxembourg at the Stade Josy Barthel. He won the last of his 22 senior caps on 5 March 2014, in a 0–0 friendly in a friendly against Cyprus. He withdrew from Northern Ireland's squad three months later in order to focus on his pre-season with Huddersfield Town, citing injury issues during the 2013–14 season in his decision.

== Style of play ==
Former Burnley manager Eddie Howe described Paterson as "a real grafter, you can see that with the way he plays, he sets the tone really in terms of his closing down and work rate and also he's got quality as well".

== Coaching career ==
Paterson was appointed as an assistant coach to head coach Neill Collins at the Tampa Bay Rowdies in July 2018. In February 2020, he was named as assistant coach to Jason Kreis at USL League One club Fort Lauderdale CF. He was hired as an assistant coach at Major League Soccer club Inter Miami in January 2022. Seven months later he returned to England to work as Michael Duff's assistant at League One club Barnsley. He joined Duff at Swansea City in June 2023, working as an assistant head coach alongside Alan Sheehan.

=== Burton Albion ===
On 11 January 2024, Paterson was appointed head coach of Burton Albion, who were 17th in League One. Owner Ben Robinson revealed in March that it was only a short-term contract but said that it was "a scenario where hopefully it's going to be a long-term relationship". Paterson left the club after Burton narrowly avoided relegation at the end of the 2023–24 season. He joined the backroom staff at Huddersfield Town in June 2024.

=== Notts County ===
On 22 June 2025, Paterson was appointed head coach of EFL League Two club Notts County, succeeding Stuart Maynard. His appointment was part of a wider club restructure that included the formation of a Technical Board and the additions of Andy Edwards as assistant head coach and former Magpies goalkeeper Sam Slocombe as first-team coach. His side showed their resilience by coming from behind to defeat Swindon Town 2–1 on 27 January. The team won six matches in a row between December and February, marking the club's longest winning run in the EFL since September 2017. He led the club to a play-off final at the end of the 2025–26 season and prepared for the big game by chopping trees and listening to country music. Notts County won the game at Wembley 3–0 against Salford, returning to League One for the first time in 11 years. In mid-September 2026, after a strong start to the new season after promotion, it was announced that Paterson had signed a new contract running until 2029.

== Career statistics ==
=== Club ===
Appearances and goals by club, season and competition
Club	Season	League			National cup (Note: Includes FA Cup, U.S. Open Cup, AIFF Super Cup)		League cup (Note: Includes Football League Cup)		Other		Total	
Club	Season	Division	Apps	Goals	Apps	Goals	Apps	Goals	Apps	Goals	Apps	Goals
Stoke City	2004–05	Championship	3	0	0	0	0	0	—		3	0
Stoke City	2005–06	Championship	3	0	0	0	0	0	—		3	0
Stoke City	2006–07	Championship	9	1	0	0	1	0	—		10	1
Stoke City	Total		15	1	0	0	1	0	—		16	1
Grimsby Town (loan)	2006–07	League Two	15	6	—		—		—		15	6
Scunthorpe United	2007–08	Championship	40	13	1	0	1	1	—		42	14
Burnley	2008–09	Championship	43	12	4	1	7	5	3 (Note: Appearances in Championship play-offs)	1	57	19
Burnley	2009–10	Premier League	23	4	1	0	2	0	—		26	4
Burnley	2010–11	Championship	11	2	1	1	2	0	—		14	3
Burnley	2011–12	Championship	14	3	1	0	0	0	—		15	3
Burnley	2012–13	Championship	39	8	0	0	0	0	—		39	8
Burnley	Total		130	29	7	2	11	5	3	1	151	37
Huddersfield Town	2013–14	Championship	22	5	1	1	3	0	—		26	6
Huddersfield Town	2014–15	Championship	3	0	0	0	0	0	—		3	0
Huddersfield Town	Total		25	5	1	1	3	0	—		29	6
Bristol City (loan)	2013–14	League One	8	1	—		—		—		8	1
Fleetwood Town (loan)	2014–15	League One	3	0	—		—		—		3	0
Orlando City	2015	Major League Soccer	4	0	—		—		0	0	4	0
Blackpool	2015–16	League One	17	0	1	0	0	0	1 (Note: Appearances in Football League Trophy / EFL Trophy)	0	19	0
Port Vale	2016–17	League One	16	2	1	0	0	0	1	0	18	2
Tampa Bay Rowdies	2017	United Soccer League	27	9	2	1	—		0	0	29	10
ATK	2017–18	Indian Super League	5	1	0	0	—		—		5	1
Career total			305	67	13	4	16	6	5	1	339	78

=== International ===
Appearances and goals by national team and year
National team	Year	Apps	Goals
Northern Ireland	2007	1	0
Northern Ireland	2008	6	0
Northern Ireland	2009	4	0
Northern Ireland	2010	1	0
Northern Ireland	2011	0	0
Northern Ireland	2012	2	1
Northern Ireland	2013	7	2
Northern Ireland	2014	1	0
Total		22	3

Scores and results list Northern Ireland's goal tally first, score column indicates score after each Paterson goal.

List of international goals scored by Martin Paterson
No.	Date	Venue	Opponent	Score	Result	Competition
1	15 August 2012	Windsor Park, Belfast, Northern Ireland	Finland	3–3	3–3	Friendly
2	14 August 2013	Windsor Park, Belfast, Northern Ireland	Russia	1–0	2–2	2014 FIFA World Cup qualification
3	10 September 2013	Stade Josy Barthel, Luxembourg City, Luxembourg	Luxembourg	1–0	2–3	2014 FIFA World Cup qualification

== Managerial statistics ==
As of match played 21 November 2026

Managerial record by team and tenure
Team	From	To	Record					Ref.
Team	From	To	P	W	D	L	Win %	Ref.
Burton Albion	11 January 2024	24 May 2024	20	5	3	12	25.0	
Notts County	22 June 2025	Present	72	33	17	22	45.8	
Total			92	38	20	34	41.3	

== Honours ==
=== Player ===
Burnley

- Football League Championship play-offs: 2009

=== Manager ===
Notts County

- EFL League Two play-offs: 2026
