= Abass Mohammed =

Ghanaian professional footballer (born 1995)

Mohammed Abass
Personal information
- Full name: Mohammed Abass
- Date of birth: 21 January 1995 (age 31)
- Place of birth: Accra, Ghana
- Height: 1.86 m (6 ft 1 in)
- Position: Forward

Team information
- Current team: Techiman Eleven Wonders
- Number: 20

Youth career
- 2009-2011: Red Bull Ghana

Senior career*
Years	Team	Apps	(Gls)
2011-2012	Tema Youth	27	(11)
2012–2013	Medeama	14	(4)
2017–2018	Asante Kotoko	7	(1)
2019–2020	Enyimba	58	(23)
2020–2021	Medeama	28	(7)
2021-present	Techiman Eleven Wonders	10	(0)
- * Club domestic league appearances and goals as of 10:23, 22 January 2022 (UTC)

Mohammed Abass (born 21 January 1995) is a Ghanaian professional footballer who plays for Techiman Eleven Wonders.

== Career ==
=== Youth ===
Abass began his youth football at Red Bull Academy in Ghana. He later joined Tema Youth in July 2011 where he signed his first professional contract.

=== Medeama ===
Mohammed started playing in the Ghana Premier League with Medeama in 2013.

He won the 2016 Ghana Super Cup and scored 5 goals during their 2016 CAF Confederation Cup campaign helping them qualify for the group stages of the competition for the first time in the club's history.

=== Asante Kotoko ===
His performances with Medeama attracted attention from other club in Ghana and he was signed on a free transfer by Asante Kotoko in 2017. He played 13 league matches and scored 2 goals during the 2017 Ghana Premier League season. He was released by the club in April 2019, after an unimpressive showdown due to a long niggling knee injury.

=== Enyimba ===
After being released by Asante Kotoko in April, Mohammed signed for Nigerian side Enyimba on July 23, 2019. He signed a two-year deal with the People's Elephant lads after successful negotiations and passing his medicals. He joined compatriots Farouk Mohammed and Fatau Dauda who were playing at the club.

=== Return to Medeama ===
After serving one year of his two-year with Enyimba, Mohammed terminated his contract with the Aba-based club and rejoined former side Medeama on October 23, 2020, ahead of the 2020–21 Ghana Premier League season. On 24 January 2021, he scored a brace against International Allies to help Medeama to a 2–1 victory and maintain their home unbeaten run within that season.

=== Techiman Eleven Wonders ===
On 21 October 2021, Abass was signed by Ghana Premier League club Techiman Eleven Wonders in a definitive deal on a 2-year contract.
