= Jonathan Mendoza =

Colombian footballer (born 1990)

Personal information
- Full name: Jonathan Fabian Mendoza Valenzuela
- Date of birth: January 26, 1990 (age 36)
- Place of birth: Bogotá, Colombia
- Position: Midfielder

Team information
- Current team: Rome Gladiators

Youth career
- –2009: Lyman Greyhounds

College career
Years	Team	Apps	(Gls)
2009–2012	Stetson Hatters	68	(18)

Senior career*
Years	Team	Apps	(Gls)
2008–2012	Orlando City U-23	70	(13)
2013	Orlando City	20	(0)
2014–2015	Rochester Rhinos	57	(4)
2016	Orlando City B	30	(2)
2017	Harrisburg City Islanders	23	(2)
2018–2019	Orlando SeaWolves (indoor)	23	(10)
2021–	Rome Gladiators (indoor)	1	(0)
- * Club domestic league appearances and goals as of 11 January 2022

Jonathan Fabian Mendoza Valenzuela (born January 26, 1990) is a Colombian footballer who currently plays for the Rome Gladiators in the National Indoor Soccer League.

== Career ==
=== College and amateur ===
Mendoza was born in Colombia, but moved to Altamonte Springs, graduating from Lyman High School in 2009. During his senior year in high school, he was second-team All-American, and first-team All-Central Florida, according to ESPN RISE.

He accepted a scholarship offer from Stetson in DeLand, Florida, where he started most of his career. He totaled 18 goals and 22 assists in 68 matches (57 starts). He was the 2011 Atlantic Sun Conference Player of the Year in men's soccer after scoring 11 goals that season.

In addition to Stetson, he played with Orlando City U-23 (and Central Florida Kraze before that) in the USL Premier Development League. He led the U-23 Lions to the Southeast Division and Southern Conference titles in 2012.

=== Professional ===
Mendoza made himself available for the 2013 MLS SuperDraft, but went undrafted. He was signed to Orlando City Soccer Club on March 1, 2013.

After the 2013 season, he was released by Orlando City and signed with the Rochester Rhinos, thereby staying in the USL Pro.
