= Fredrick Yamoah Opoku =

Ghanaian footballer (born 1997)

Frederick Yamoah Opoku
Personal information
- Date of birth: 19 September 1997 (age 29)
- Place of birth: Accra, Ghana
- Height: 1.68 m (5 ft 6 in)
- Position: Winger

Team information
- Current team: Flower City Union
- Number: 19

Senior career*
Years	Team	Apps	(Gls)
2013–2017	Inter Allies	45	(2)
2017	→ Harrisburg City Islanders (loan)	15	(0)
2018	→ Penn FC (loan)	15	(1)
2018–2019	Køge	14	(0)
2019–2020	Bylis	3	(0)
2023–	Flower City Union	1	(0)

International career
2016	Ghana U20	1	(0)
- * Club domestic league appearances and goals as of 2 April 2023

Frederick Yamoah Opoku (born 19 September 1997) is a Ghanaian professional footballer who plays as a winger for Flower City Union, in the National Independent Soccer Association.

Opoku started his career playing for Inter Allies in Ghana. In 2017, he moved to the United States to join New England Revolution in Boston for trials, he spent three weeks with them before joining Harrisburg City Islanders in Pennsylvania that same year on loan from Inter Allies. At Harrisburg City Islanders, Opoku played over 15 matches. He moved on loan the next season to Penn FC where he was noticed by Per Rud, the sporting director of HB Køge in Denmark where he played before moving to Albania.

== Early life ==
Born in Osu, Accra to Augustina Akua Mensah and Benard Opoku, Opoku attended Royal Technical College at Nungua where he studied Electronics and Telecommunication. He began his football career at a very young age, playing in the streets of Osu with his friends. He was discovered by the then coach of Obonu FC in Labadi, Mr Paul Bentil Johnson and got the chance of playing for his team. He later moved to Kindoko FC, the youth side of Tudu Mighty Jets FC, and from there he then moved to Accra Youth FC.

== Club career ==
=== Inter Allies ===
Opoku first played at the junior side, Accra Youth FC, where he developed and played as a winger and was later promoted to the senior side. He was called up to join the senior side during the first round of games in the 2013–14 season. He made his debut for the club later that season, and then appeared in all 30 of the team's games in the 2014–15 season.

=== Penn FC ===
==== 2017–18: Loan move from Inter Allies to Harrisburg City Islanders ====
"Freddie is an exciting young player that we think has a bright future and we’re happy to have him as a part of our team."

— Head Coach Bill Becher - Penn FCin May 2017.

On 6 May 2017, Inter Allies announced that Opoku had joined the United Soccer League side Penn FC, formerly the Harrisburg City Islanders, in the United States. He signed on loan for the 2017 USL season.

=== HB Køge ===
Opoku completed his move to Danish lower-tier side HB Køge early last year. He joined the Blue and Black lads on a three-year contract after playing 15 matches halfway through the 2018 USL season with Penn FC. Last season, Yamoah had a season long loan stint with the same side where he played 15 matches.

"There is no doubt that this cooperation opens some doors for us that we did not previously have access to, Fredrick has left a really good impression here and we have also seen him play in the United States. He brings some speed, has fast feet and is not afraid of challenging his opponent. He has power in his run, works both ways and can use both legs, giving us some opportunities on both sides."

— Sports Director Per Rud - HB Køge in August 2018.

Opoku got off to a flying start as he helped HB Køge register a 3–0 winners over Silkeborg IF at the JYSK Park in Silkeborg on his debut. He also scored on his cup debut for HB Køge in their heavy away win in the Danish Cup, defeating Humlebæk 4–1 at the Humlebæk Stadion in Humlebæk to progress comfortably to the next stage of the competition. He played until a quarter of an hour left where he was substituted by Liam Jordan. Jacob Johansson scored first for the away side in the 11th minute before Aleksander Sepp doubled the lead just 9 minutes before the break. Magnus Hauser made it 3 just four minutes after recess and Opoku ended it with a 4th goal putting the icing on the cake in the 67th minute.

He wore number 7 jersey and has his last name, Opoku, printed at the back of his jersey.

On 1 September 2019 HB Køge confirmed, that Opoku had left the club by mutual agreement.

== International career ==
=== 2016–17: Youth level and early international career ===
Opoku has also seen international action, competing for the Ghana national U20 team in African Youth Championship qualifiers in 2016.

As of 7 February 2019.

Ghana U20
Year	Apps	Goals
2016	1	0
Total	1	0
