= Rasheed Olabiyi =

Nigerian footballer (born 1990)

Personal information
- Date of birth: August 8, 1990 (age 36)
- Place of birth: Ibadan, Nigeria
- Height: 6 ft 0 in (1.83 m)
- Position: Midfielder

Youth career
- Pepsi Football Academy

Senior career*
Years	Team	Apps	(Gls)
2007–2015	Enyimba		
2015	→ Shooting Stars (loan)		
2015	Houston Dynamo	7	(0)
2017	Harrisburg City Islanders	27	(1)

International career^{‡}
- Nigeria U17
- Nigeria U20
- Nigeria U23
- * Club domestic league appearances and goals as of October 19, 2017 ‡ National team caps and goals as of June 10, 2013

Rasheed Olabiyi (born 8 August 1990 in Ibadan) is an association football midfielder.

== Career ==
=== Youth ===
As a youth, Olabiyi spent time with the Pepsi Football Academy in Nigeria. During the 2006 and 2007 seasons, he was named the team's MVP while playing alongside players such as John Obi Mikel and Elderson Echiejile.

=== Professional ===
In 2007, Olabiyi joined Enyimba International F.C. of the Nigerian Premier League. Between 2007 and 2015, he helped the club win the Nigeria Premier League in 2010 as well as the Nigerian FA Cup in 2009, 2013, and 2014. Additionally, he helped the team win two Nigerian Super Cups: 2010 and 2013. In 2010, he went on trial with Super League Greece club Asteras Tripolis. In 2011, he was part of the squad that also reached the semifinals of the 2011 CAF Champions League. Following the 2014 season, he was awarded the league's Wonder Goal Award for his strike in a 3–3 draw against Abia Warriors. Olabiyi donated ₦ 50,000 of his prize money to the Ngwa Road Motherless Babies Home. Olabiyi left Enyimba in March 2015 after a seven-year stint over financial disagreements. It was announced at that time that he was set to join Shooting Stars SC, also of the NPL, with interest in the player also coming from Kano Pillars and Warri Wolves. It was later revealed that the move to Shooting Stars was a loan. He finished out the season with his hometown club, which included a 1–0 defeat to his former club Enyimba in May 2015.

On 9 July 2015, it was announced that Olabiyi had signed for the Houston Dynamo of Major League Soccer. He made his debut for his club the following day, coming on as a 79th-minute substitute for Alexander López in the eventual 2–0 victory over the San Jose Earthquakes.

Olabiyi signed with United Soccer League side Harrisburg City Islanders on 21 March 2017.

=== International ===
Olabiyi has represented Nigeria at the U17, U20, and U23 levels.

== Honours ==
As of 10 July 2015

=== Individual ===
- Pepsi Football Academy MVP: 2006, 2007
- Nigeria Premier League Best XI: 2014
- NPL Wonder Goal Award: 2014

=== Club ===
- Nigeria Premier League Champion: 2009–10
- Nigeria Premier League Runner-Up: 2012/2013, 2013/2014
- Nigerian FA Cup: 2009, 2013, 2014
- Nigerian Super Cup: 2010, 2013
- 2011 CAF Champions League: Semifinalist
