= Travis Brent =

American soccer defender

Personal information
- Date of birth: February 17, 1992 (age 34)
- Place of birth: Virginia Beach, Virginia, United States
- Height: 1.76 m (5 ft 9 in)
- Position: Defender

Youth career
- 2007–2010: Virginia Rush

College career
Years	Team	Apps	(Gls)
2010–2013	Marshall Thundering Herd	67	(3)

Senior career*
Years	Team	Apps	(Gls)
2013	Portland Timbers U23's	6	(0)
2014–2015	Heracles Almelo	0	(0)
2015–2016	Almere City	10	(0)
2017	Harrisburg City Islanders	21	(0)
- * Club domestic league appearances and goals as of October 19, 2017

Travis Brent (born February 17, 1992) is an American former soccer defender. He is currently the associate head coach for the men’s soccer team at the University of Vermont. Brent was previously the head men's soccer coach at Franklin Pierce University.

== Career ==
=== Youth and college ===
Brent played college soccer at Marshall University between 2010 and 2013. While at college, Brent appeared for USL PDL side Portland Timbers U23's in 2013.

=== Professional ===
Out of college, Brent signed with Dutch side Heracles Almelo on August 13, 2014. Brent moved to Almere City FC in June 2015.

Brent returned to the United States in 2017, signing with United Soccer League side Harrisburg City Islanders on March 6, 2017.

=== Coaching ===
Brent was an assistant coach at the University of Charleston from 2019 to 2022. While he was there, the Golden Eagles won the 2019 NCAA Division II national championship.

He was named the head coach of the men's soccer team at Franklin Pierce University on December 20, 2022. Franklin Pierce won the Division II national championship in his first season as head coach.

The Ravens went 13-3-4 under Brent in 2024, reaching round three of the NCAA tournament. He led Franklin Pierce to a Northeast-10 Conference tournament championship in 2025, giving his team automatic entry to the NCAA tournament.

Brent was named the associate head coach at the University of Vermont on January 21, 2026.

== Head coaching record ==
Record table
Season	Team	Overall	Conference	Standing	Postseason
Franklin Pierce Ravens (Northeast-10 Conference) (2023–2025)
2023	Franklin Pierce	21-0-2	10-0-0	1st	NCAA Champion
2024	Franklin Pierce	13-3-4	4–1-4	3rd	Third Round
2025	Franklin Pierce	12-4-4	6–1-2	3rd	Third Round
Franklin Pierce:		46–7-10	20–2–6		
Total:		46-6-9			
National champion Postseason invitational champion Conference regular season champion Conference regular season and conference tournament champion Division regular season champion Division regular season and conference tournament champion Conference tournament champion
